= 1995 FIVB Volleyball Women's World Cup squads =

This article shows all participating team squads at the 1995 FIVB Women's World Cup, held from November 3 to November 17, 1995 in several cities in Japan.

== Brazil ==
- Head coach: Bernardo Rezende

#	Name	Date of birth	Height	Weight	Spike	Block
2	Ana Moser	14.08.1968	185	70	310	289
3	Janina Conceição	25.10.1972	192	82	312	288
4	Ana Ida Alvares	22.01.1965	178	64	300	282
8	Leila Barros	30.09.1971	179	71	300	291
9	Hilma Caldeira	05.01.1972	183	63	312	284
10	Virna Dias	31.08.1971	184	70	306	294
11	Marcia Cunha	26.07.1969	185	80	295	278
13	Ana Flavia Sanglard	20.06.1970	187	78	299	290
14	Fernanda Venturini	24.10.1970	180	68	292	280
15	Hélia Souza	10.03.1970	173	63	283	265
16	Denise Souza	02.09.1967	183	77	292	276
17	Sandra Suruagy	17.04.1963	178	65	297	288

== Canada ==
- Head coach: Mike Burchuk

#	Name	Date of birth	Height	Weight	Spike	Block
1	Diane Ratnik	14.07.1962
2	Josée Corbeil	25.05.1973
4	Katrina Von Sass	25.01.1972
5	Brigitte Soucy	11.10.1972	181
7	Erminia Russo	24.07.1964	173		293	278
8	Michelle Sawatzky	14.07.1970
9	Janis Kelly	20.03.1971	175
10	Lori Ann Mundt	19.05.1971	169
11	Tara Macintyre
12	Kathy Tough	22.02.1969
13	Wanda Guenette	31.08.1962	178
14	Christine Toews

== China ==
- Head coach: Lang Ping

#	Name	Date of birth	Height	Weight	Spike	Block
1	Lai Yawen	09.09.1970	187		319	305
2	Li Yan	01.05.1976	178	75	312	306
3	Cui Yongmei	25.01.1969	181		306	285
4	Zhu Yunying	15.01.1978	175	64	300	280
5	Wu Yongmei	01.01.1975	186	74	317	295
6	Wang Yi	25.05.1973	189	79
7	He Qi	24.08.1973	178	68	305	295
8	Pan Wenli	08.03.1969	182
10	Wang Ziling	14.01.1972	181		305	290
11	Sun Yue	15.03.1973	186	76	314	290
12	Deng Yang
18	Yin Yin	02.01.1974	183	73	322	310

== Croatia ==
- Head coach: Ivica Jelić

#	Name	Date of birth	Height	Weight	Spike	Block
1	Nataša Osmokrović	27.05.1976	184	69	328	320
2	Dušica Kalaba
3	Željka Jovičić
4	Marijana Ribičić	21.02.1979	186	74	290	280
5	Snježana Mijić	25.12.1971	180
6	Tatjana Andrić
7	Slavica Kuzmanić	27.03.1972	190		310	290
8	Barbara Jelić	08.05.1977	193	75	320	300
9	Vanesa Srsen	23.12.1971	184		295	285
10	Gordana Jurčan	01.05.1971	191	71
11	Elena Chebukina	11.10.1965	188	77
12	Irina Kirillova	13.05.1965	180	72	300	285

== Cuba ==
- Head coach: Eugenio George Lafita

#	Name	Date of birth	Height	Weight	Spike	Block
2	Marlenis Costa	30.07.1973	176	76	334	312
3	Mireya Luis	28.08.1967	175	69	335	316
4	Lilian Izquierdo	10.02.1967	174	71	319	308
5	Idalmis Gato	30.09.1971	178	65
6	Raisa O'Farrill	17.04.1972	181
8	Regla Bell	06.07.1971	181	73	326	315
10	Regla Torres	12.02.1975	193	75	331	315
12	Taismary Agüero	05.03.1977	177	69	318	304
14	Ana Fernández	03.08.1973	187	78	326	312
15	Magaly Carvajal	18.12.1968	191	85	331	315
16	Mirka Francia	14.02.1975	184	73	324	310
17	Martha Sánchez	17.05.1973	184	75	324	310

== Egypt ==
- Head coach: Raof Abdelkader

#	Name	Date of birth	Height	Weight	Spike	Block
1	Suzan Saleh
2	Mariam Mahmoud
3	Mona Abdel-Karim
6	Yosria Shagia
7	Nadia Sari
8	Nahed Badawy
9	Nglaa Fawzy
10	Nessrin Noureldin
11	Tahani Tosson	22.09.1971	177	77	305	295
12	Azza Tahha
13	Dena Gouda
17	Neamat Badawy	02.01.1981	184	84	299	290

== Japan ==
- Head coach: Koji Kojima

#	Name	Date of birth	Height	Weight	Spike	Block
1	Chieko Nakanishi	24.08.1966	163	53	286	270
2	Aki Nagatomi	15.07.1969	173	63	290	281
3	Mika Yamauchi	07.10.1969	182	69	317	294
4	Kaori Tsuchiya	14.10.1969	176	73	302	288
8	Kazumi Nakamura	24.02.1971	170	67	295	283
9	Mika Saiki	25.09.1971	172	63	295	284
10	Asako Tajimi	26.02.1972	180	68	308
12	Airi Suekuni
13	Yuka Egoshi	17.01.1974	184
14	Yuki Nakano	05.08.1976	182
15	Motoko Obayashi	15.06.1967	182	67	312	293
16	Tomoko Yoshihara	04.02.1970	180

== Kenya ==
- Head coach: Sadatoshi Sugawara

#	Name	Date of birth	Height	Weight	Spike	Block
1	Dorcas Murunga	12.05.1969	170
2	Nancy Lijodi	20.09.1971	172
3	Doris Wanjala	24.12.1966	170	72
4	Margaret Indakala	24.08.1962	178		290	278
5	Esther Jepkosgei
8	Helen Elele	09.09.1973	179		290	275
9	Dorcas Nakhomicha Ndasaba	31.03.1971	174		288	272
10	Beatrice Kwoba
12	Esther Barno	06.06.1968	182		295	290
13	Nancy Sikobe	15.08.1970	180
14	Esther Ouna	10.01.1968	160
16	Catherine Mabwi	01.08.1966	173		289	272

== Netherlands ==
- Head coach: Bert Goedkoop

#	Name	Date of birth	Height	Weight	Spike	Block
1	Jerine Fleurke	11.08.1973	188
3	Erna Brinkman	25.03.1972	184
5	Cintha Boersma	01.05.1969	182		308	294
6	Petra Groenland
7	Irena Machovcak	13.11.1968	186		310	294
8	Riëtte Fledderus	18.10.1977	168		284	276
9	Marjolein de Jong	16.05.1968	185
11	Marrit Leenstra	18.10.1973	179	68
12	Elles Leferink	14.11.1976	176		299	284
13	Claudia van Thiel	22.12.1977	184		309	291
14	Jolanda Elshof	05.08.1975	184
15	Ingrid Visser	04.06.1977	190	74	306	294

== Peru ==
- Head coach: Jorge Sato

#	Name	Date of birth	Height	Weight	Spike	Block
1	Sara Joya	13.07.1977	182	70	298	295
2	Iris Falcón	01.11.1973	173	78	300	293
5	Gloria de la Borda		170
6	Paola Ramos	20.04.1975	173
7	Milagros Moy	17.10.1975	175	72	296	285
9	Sandra Rodriguez	12.04.1974	180
10	Yulissa Zamudio	24.03.1976	183		310	303
14	Marjorie Vilchez	15.01.1978	185
15	Veronica Contreras	08.06.1977	173	63	280	282
16	Leyla Chihuán	04.09.1975	180	67	310	303
18	Patricia Soto	10.02.1980	179		300	295

== South Korea ==
- Head coach: Kim Cheol-Yong

#	Name	Date of birth	Height	Weight	Spike	Block
1	Ku Min-Jung	25.08.1973	181	73	315	300
3	Lee Do-Hee	27.01.1968	170
4	Chang Yoon-Hee	22.05.1970	170	63
5	Lee Soo-Jung	25.08.1972
6	Choi Kwang-Hee	17.05.1984	172
8	Chung Sun-Hye	17.12.1975	174		306	290
9	Kim Nam-Soon	25.07.1970	180
10	Park Soo-Jeong	02.03.1972	178	68	305	295
11	Hong Ji-Yeon	08.09.1970	187		314	304
12	Lee In-Sook	06.10.1971	178
14	Jung Eun-Sun	06.04.1973	177		308	291
15	Chang So-Yun	11.11.1974	184	76	312	301

== United States ==
- Head coach: Taras Liskevich

#	Name	Date of birth	Height	Weight	Spike	Block
2	Yoko Zetterlund	24.03.1969	180	65	300	290
3	Paula Weishoff	01.05.1962	188	79
4	Caren Kemner	16.04.1965	185	79
5	Lori Endicott	01.08.1967	175
7	Beverly Oden	09.03.1971	189	79
8	Tammy Liley	06.03.1965	180
9	Elaina Oden	21.03.1967	185	64
10	Danielle Scott	01.10.1972	189	85	325	302
13	Tara Cross-Battle	16.09.1968	183	76	302	300
14	Natalie Williams		188	98
15	Elaine Youngs	14.02.1970	183
