= Kenya at the 2004 Summer Olympics =

- IOC code: KEN
- NOC: National Olympic Committee of Kenya
- Website: teamkenya.or.ke

in Athens
- Competitors: 46 in 4 sports
- Flag bearer: Violet Barasa
- Medals Ranked 41st: Gold 1 Silver 4 Bronze 2 Total 7

Summer Olympics appearances (overview)
- 1956; 1960; 1964; 1968; 1972; 1976–1980; 1984; 1988; 1992; 1996; 2000; 2004; 2008; 2012; 2016; 2020; 2024

Kenya competed at the 2004 Summer Olympics in Athens, Greece, from 13 to 29 August 2004. This was the nation's eleventh appearance at the Olympics, except the 1976 Summer Olympics in Montreal and the 1980 Summer Olympics in Moscow because of the African and United States boycott.

National Olympic Committee Kenya (NOCK) sent the nation's smallest delegation to the Games since the 1968 Summer Olympics in Mexico City. A total of 46 athletes, 22 men and 24 women, competed only in athletics (specifically in the middle-distance events and marathon), rowing, swimming, and volleyball, the nation's team-based sport at these games. For the first time in its Olympic history, Kenya was represented by more female than male athletes due to the participation of the women's volleyball team. The Kenyan team featured Olympic medalists Paul Tergat in men's marathon, and Bernard Lagat, who would emigrate to America a year later, in the men's middle-distance running. Among these medalists, Lagat only managed to add a bronze medal to his career hardware for the Kenyan team at these Games before his impending transfer. Volleyball team captain Violet Barasa became the nation's first ever female flag bearer in the opening ceremony.

Kenya left Athens with a total of seven Olympic medals (one gold, four silver, and two bronze), matching its record with Sydney four years earlier. Ezekiel Kemboi managed to capture the nation's only gold medal in the men's 3000 m steeplechase, and enjoyed his teammates Brimin Kipruto and Paul Kipsiele Koech taking home the silver and bronze, as they all climbed on top of the podium for the second time in Kenya's Olympic history since 1992.

== Medalists ==
Medal	Name	Sport	Event	Date
Gold	Ezekiel Kemboi	Athletics	Men's 3000 m steeplechase	August 24
Silver	Catherine Ndereba	Athletics	Women's marathon	August 22
Silver	Isabella Ochichi	Athletics	Women's 5000 m	August 23
Silver	Bernard Lagat	Athletics	Men's 1500 m	August 24
Silver	Brimin Kipruto	Athletics	Men's 3000 m steeplechase	August 24
Bronze	Paul Kipsiele Koech	Athletics	Men's 3000 m steeplechase	August 24
Bronze	Eliud Kipchoge	Athletics	Men's 5000 m	August 28

== Athletics ==
Kenyan athletes have so far achieved qualifying standards in the following athletics events (up to a maximum of 3 athletes in each event at the 'A' Standard, and 1 at the 'B' Standard).

Key

- Note–Ranks given for track events are within the athlete's heat only
- Q = Qualified for the next round
- q = Qualified for the next round as a fastest loser or, in field events, by position without achieving the qualifying target
- NR = National record
- N/A = Round not applicable for the event
- Bye = Athlete not required to compete in round

Men

Athlete	Event	Heat		Semifinal		Final	
Athlete	Event	Result	Rank	Result	Rank	Result	Rank
Victor Kibet	400 m	DNF		Did not advance			
Vincent Mumo Kiilu	400 m	46.31	5	Did not advance			
Ezra Sambu	400 m	45.59	2 Q	45.84	7	Did not advance	
Wilfred Bungei	800 m	1:44.84	1 Q	1:44.28	1 Q	1:45.31	5
Joseph Mutua	800 m	1:45.65	1 Q	1:45.54	3	Did not advance	
Michael Rotich	800 m	1:46.42	5	Did not advance			
Timothy Kiptanui	1500 m	3:37.71	2 Q	3:41.04	3 Q	3:35.61	4
Bernard Lagat	1500 m	3:39.80	2 Q	3:35.84	2 Q	3:34.30	2nd place, silver medalist(s)
Isaac Kiprono Songok	1500 m	3:38.89	5 Q	3:37.10	7 q	3:41.72	12
Abraham Chebii	5000 m	13:22.30	5 Q	—		DNF	
John Kibowen	5000 m	13:19.65	4 Q	—		13:18.24	6
Eliud Kipchoge	5000 m	13:19.01	2 Q	—		13:15.10	3rd place, bronze medalist(s)
Charles Kamathi	10000 m	—				28:17.08	13
John Cheruiyot Korir	10000 m	—				27:41.91	6
Moses Mosop	10000 m	—				27:46.61	7
Ezekiel Kemboi	3000 m steeplechase	8:18.20	2 Q	—		8:05.81	1st place, gold medalist(s)
Brimin Kipruto	3000 m steeplechase	8:15.11	1 Q	—		8:06.11	2nd place, silver medalist(s)
Paul Kipsiele Koech	3000 m steeplechase	8:24.68	3 Q	—		8:06.64	3rd place, bronze medalist(s)
Paul Tergat	Marathon	—				2:14:45	10
Erick Wainaina	Marathon	—				2:13:30	7

Women

Athlete	Event	Heat		Semifinal		Final	
Athlete	Event	Result	Rank	Result	Rank	Result	Rank
Faith Macharia	800 m	2:06.31	6	Did not advance			
Nancy Langat	1500 m	4:06.94	4 Q	4:07.57	7	Did not advance	
Edith Masai	5000 m	15:01.92	5 Q	—		DNF	
Isabella Ochichi	5000 m	14:55.69	4 Q	—		14:48.19	2nd place, silver medalist(s)
Jane Wanjiku	5000 m	15:14.57	9	—		Did not advance	
Sally Barsosio	10000 m	—				32:14.00	17
Alice Timbilil	10000 m	—				32:12.57	16
Lucy Wangui	10000 m	—				31:05.90	9
Alice Chelangat	Marathon	—				2:33:52	11
Catherine Ndereba	Marathon	—				2:26:32	2nd place, silver medalist(s)
Margaret Okayo	Marathon	—				DNF	

== Rowing ==
Men

Athlete	Event	Heats		Repechage		Semifinals		Final	
Athlete	Event	Time	Rank	Time	Rank	Time	Rank	Time	Rank
Ibrahim Githaiga	Single sculls	8:13.33	4 R	7:25.58	4 SD/E	7:40.78	6 FE	7:29.02	29

Qualification Legend: FA=Final A (medal); FB=Final B (non-medal); FC=Final C (non-medal); FD=Final D (non-medal); FE=Final E (non-medal); FF=Final F (non-medal); SA/B=Semifinals A/B; SC/D=Semifinals C/D; SE/F=Semifinals E/F; R=Repechage

== Swimming ==
Men

Athlete	Event	Heat		Semifinal		Final	
Athlete	Event	Time	Rank	Time	Rank	Time	Rank
Amar Shah	100 m breaststroke	1:10.17	58	Did not advance			

Women

Athlete	Event	Heat		Semifinal		Final	
Athlete	Event	Time	Rank	Time	Rank	Time	Rank
Eva Donde	50 m freestyle	29.47	57	Did not advance			

== Volleyball ==
=== Women's tournament ===
Roster

The following is the Kenyan roster in the women's volleyball tournament of the 2004 Summer Olympics.

Head coach: Muge Kibet

No.	Name	Date of birth	Height	Weight	Spike	Block	2004 club
1	Philister Jebet-Sang	12 September 1984	1.85 m (6 ft 1 in)	70 kg (150 lb)	280 cm (110 in)	276 cm (109 in)	(United States) Indian Hills Community College
4	Abigael Tarus	26 August 1981	1.76 m (5 ft 9 in)	67 kg (148 lb)	282 cm (111 in)	261 cm (103 in)	Kenya Pipelines
5	Nancy Nyongesa	18 June 1987	1.70 m (5 ft 7 in)	63 kg (139 lb)	280 cm (110 in)	260 cm (100 in)	(Kenya) Lugulu
6	Catherine Wanjiru	7 August 1978	1.78 m (5 ft 10 in)	80 kg (180 lb)	285 cm (112 in)	265 cm (104 in)	Kenya Pipelines
7	Janet Wanja	24 February 1984	1.75 m (5 ft 9 in)	60 kg (130 lb)	280 cm (110 in)	280 cm (110 in)	Kenya Pipelines
9	Dorcas Nakhomicha	31 March 1971	1.73 m (5 ft 8 in)	70 kg (150 lb)	295 cm (116 in)	285 cm (112 in)	(Kenya) Telkom Volleyball
11	Roselidah Obunaga	23 December 1973	1.80 m (5 ft 11 in)	72 kg (159 lb)	284 cm (112 in)	272 cm (107 in)	(United States) Missouri State University
13	Leonidas Kamende	28 August 1979	1.82 m (6 ft 0 in)	80 kg (180 lb)	291 cm (115 in)	277 cm (109 in)	Kenya Pipelines
14	Violet Barasa (c)	21 June 1975	1.75 m (5 ft 9 in)	68 kg (150 lb)	308 cm (121 in)	295 cm (116 in)	(Greece) Panellinios V.C.
15	Gladys Nasikanda	25 July 1978	1.80 m (5 ft 11 in)	75 kg (165 lb)	290 cm (110 in)	300 cm (120 in)	(United States) Union University
17	Mercy Wesutila (L)	8 March 1976	1.53 m (5 ft 0 in)	75 kg (165 lb)	290 cm (110 in)	300 cm (120 in)	Kenya Pipelines
18	Judith Serenge	21 January 1976	1.53 m (5 ft 0 in)	60 kg (130 lb)	256 cm (101 in)	245 cm (96 in)	Kenya Pipelines

Group play

Pos	Team	Pld	W	L	Pts	SW	SL	SR	SPW	SPL	SPR	Qualification
1	Brazil	5	5	0	10	15	2	7.500	410	326	1.258	Quarterfinals
2	Italy	5	4	1	9	14	3	4.667	392	305	1.285	Quarterfinals
3	South Korea	5	3	2	8	9	7	1.286	355	352	1.009	Quarterfinals
4	Japan	5	2	3	7	6	10	0.600	346	343	1.009	Quarterfinals
5	Greece	5	1	4	6	5	12	0.417	349	383	0.911	
6	Kenya	5	0	5	5	0	15	0.000	236	379	0.623	

Source: FIVB

14 August 2004; 16:00	Greece	3–0	Kenya	Peace and Friendship Stadium; Referees: Patricia Salvatore (USA), Ibrahim Al Naama (QAT)
14 August 2004; 16:00	(25–7, 25–22, 25–14)			Peace and Friendship Stadium; Referees: Patricia Salvatore (USA), Ibrahim Al Naama (QAT)

16 August 2004; 09:00	Kenya	0-3	Brazil	Peace and Friendship Stadium; Referees: Karin Zahorcova (CZE), Umit Sokullu (TUR)
16 August 2004; 09:00	(16–25, 27–29, 12–25) result			Peace and Friendship Stadium; Referees: Karin Zahorcova (CZE), Umit Sokullu (TUR)

18 August 2004; 09:00	South Korea	3-0	Kenya	Peace and Friendship Stadium; Referees: de Jan Jovanovic (SCG), Karin Zahorcova (CZE)
18 August 2004; 09:00	(25–16, 25–20, 25–19) result			Peace and Friendship Stadium; Referees: de Jan Jovanovic (SCG), Karin Zahorcova (CZE)

20 August 2004; 19:30	Kenya	0-3	Italy	Peace and Friendship Stadium; Referees: Francisco Medina Guzman (CUB), Patricia Salvatore (USA)
20 August 2004; 19:30	(17–25, 13–25, 14–25) result			Peace and Friendship Stadium; Referees: Francisco Medina Guzman (CUB), Patricia Salvatore (USA)

22 August 2004; 11:00	Japan	3–0	Kenya	Peace and Friendship Stadium; Referees: Georgios Karampetsos (GRE), Umit Sokullu (TUR)
22 August 2004; 11:00	(25–8, 25–17, 25–14) result			Peace and Friendship Stadium; Referees: Georgios Karampetsos (GRE), Umit Sokullu (TUR)

== See also ==
- Kenya at the 2004 Summer Paralympics
- Kenya at the 2006 Commonwealth Games
