= 2015 Women's African Volleyball Championship =

Tournament details
- Host country: Kenya
- City: Nairobi
- Dates: 12 – 20 June
- Teams: 8
- Venue: 1 (in 1 host city)

Final positions
- Champions: Kenya (9th title)

Tournament awards
- MVP: (Kenya) Everlyne Makuto

Tournament statistics
- Matches played: 20

The 2015 Women's African Nations Championship was the 17th edition of the Women's African Volleyball Championship organised by Africa's governing volleyball body, the Confédération Africaine de Volleyball. It was held in Nairobi, Kenya, from 12 to 20 June 2015. The top two team qualified for the 2015 FIVB Volleyball Women's World Cup.

Kenya won the championship defeating Algeria in the final and Cameroon won the bronze medal over Senegal.

== Competing nations ==
The following national teams have confirmed participation:

- Algeria
- Botswana
- Cameroon
- Kenya
- Mauritius
- Morocco
- Senegal
- Tunisia

== Venue ==
Nairobi, Kenya	2015 Women's African Volleyball Championship is located in Kenya
Kasarani Indoor Arena	2015 Women's African Volleyball Championship is located in Kenya
Capacity: 5,000	2015 Women's African Volleyball Championship is located in Kenya

== Format ==
The tournament is played in two stages. In the first stage, the participants are divided in two groups. A single round-robin format is played within each group to determine the teams' group position (as per procedure below).

In the second stage, the two best teams of each group progress to the semifinals, while the third and fourth placed teams from each group progress to the classification matches (for 5th to 8th place). The second stage of the tournament consists of a single-elimination.

=== Pool standing procedure ===
1. Number of matches won
2. Match points
3. Sets ratio
4. Points ratio
5. Result of the last match between the tied teams

Match won 3–0 or 3–1: 3 match points for the winner, 0 match points for the loser
Match won 3–2: 2 match points for the winner, 1 match point for the loser

== Pool composition ==
The drawing of lots was held in Nairobi, Kenya on 12 June.

Pool A	Pool B
Kenya	Cameroon
Mauritius	Tunisia
Botswana	Morocco
Algeria	Senegal

== Preliminary round ==
- All times are East Africa Time (UTC+03:00).

=== Pool A ===
Pos	Team	Pld	W	L	Pts	SW	SL	SR	SPW	SPL	SPR	Qualification
1	Kenya	3	3	0	9	9	0	MAX	225	152	1.480	Championship round
2	Algeria	3	2	1	6	6	4	1.500	229	207	1.106	Championship round
3	Botswana	3	1	2	3	4	7	0.571	225	252	0.893	5th-8th classification
4	Mauritius	3	0	3	0	1	9	0.111	181	249	0.727	5th-8th classification

Date	Time		Score		Set 1	Set 2	Set 3	Set 4	Set 5	Total	Report
12 Jun	18:00	Mauritius	0–3	Kenya	12–25	13–25	17–25			42–75	Result
13 Jun	14:00	Botswana	1–3	Algeria	17–25	25–17	20–25	16–25		78–92	Result
14 Jun	12:00	Mauritius	1–3	Botswana	22–25	25–23	23–25	15–25		85–98	Result
14 Jun	16:00	Kenya	3–0	Algeria	25–20	25–22	25–19			75–61	Result
15 Jun	12:00	Algeria	3–0	Mauritius	25–15	25–15	26–24			76–54	Result
15 Jun	16:00	Kenya	3–0	Botswana	25–19	25–12	25–18			75–49	Result

=== Pool B ===
Pos	Team	Pld	W	L	Pts	SW	SL	SR	SPW	SPL	SPR	Qualification
1	Senegal	3	3	0	6	9	6	1.500	316	286	1.105	Championship round
2	Cameroon	3	2	1	6	8	5	1.600	282	273	1.033	Championship round
3	Tunisia	3	1	2	5	7	7	1.000	307	280	1.096	5th-8th classification
4	Morocco	3	0	3	1	3	9	0.333	218	284	0.768	5th-8th classification

Date	Time		Score		Set 1	Set 2	Set 3	Set 4	Set 5	Total	Report
12 Jun	16:00	Senegal	3–2	Cameroon	20–25	25–27	25–16	25–20	15–12	110–100	Result
13 Jun	16:00	Tunisia	3–1	Morocco	24–26	25–17	25–21	25–13		99–77	Result
14 Jun	10:00	Cameroon	3–0	Morocco	25–17	25–18	25–20			75–55	Result
14 Jun	14:00	Senegal	3–2	Tunisia	14–25	17–25	25–18	25–20	15–12	96–100	Result
15 Jun	10:00	Tunisia	2–3	Cameroon	25–15	18–25	26–28	26–24	13–15	108–107	Result
15 Jun	14:00	Morocco	2–3	Senegal	25–23	25–22	9–25	18–25	9–15	86–110	Result

== Final round ==
- All times are East Africa Time (UTC+03:00).

=== 5th–8th place ===
Semifinals
17 June
Botswana	0
Morocco	3
17 June
Tunisia	3
Mauritius	0

Fifth place
18 June
Morocco	1
Tunisia	3
Seventh place
18 June
Botswana	1
Mauritius	3

==== Classification 5th–8th places ====
Date	Time		Score		Set 1	Set 2	Set 3	Set 4	Set 5	Total	Report
17 Jun	10:00	Botswana	0–3	Morocco	22–25	22–25	12–25			56–75	Result
17 Jun	12:00	Tunisia	3–0	Mauritius	25–13	25–17	25–14			75–44	Result

==== Seventh place match ====
Date	Time		Score		Set 1	Set 2	Set 3	Set 4	Set 5	Total	Report
18 Jun	14:00	Botswana	1–3	Mauritius	25–17	21–25	19–25	21–25		86–92	Result

==== Fifth place match ====
Date	Time		Score		Set 1	Set 2	Set 3	Set 4	Set 5	Total	Report
18 Jun	16:00	Morocco	1–3	Tunisia	16–25	25–21	21–25	21–25		83–96	Result

=== Championship ===
Semifinals
17 June
Kenya	3
Cameroon	0
17 June
Senegal	0
Algeria	3

Final
20 June
Kenya	3
Algeria	0
Third place
20 June
Cameroon	3
Senegal	2

==== Semifinals ====
Date	Time		Score		Set 1	Set 2	Set 3	Set 4	Set 5	Total	Report
17 Jun	14:00	Senegal	0–3	Algeria	14–25	17–25	22–25			53–75	Result
17 Jun	16:00	Kenya	3–0	Cameroon	25–22	25–14	25–22			75–58	Result

==== Bronze medal match ====
Date	Time		Score		Set 1	Set 2	Set 3	Set 4	Set 5	Total	Report
20 Jun	14:00	Cameroon	3–2	Senegal	25–19	23–25	14–25	25–13	17–15	104–97	Result

==== Final ====
Date	Time		Score		Set 1	Set 2	Set 3	Set 4	Set 5	Total	Report
20 Jun	16:00	Kenya	3–0	Algeria	25–17	25–21	25–20			75–58	Result

== Final standing ==
Rank	Team
1st place, gold medalist(s)	Kenya
2nd place, silver medalist(s)	Algeria
3rd place, bronze medalist(s)	Cameroon
4	Senegal
5	Tunisia
6	Morocco
7	Mauritius
8	Botswana

Qualified for the 2015 FIVB World Cup

Source: CAVB.

2015 Women's African Volleyball Championship

Kenya
9th title

12–woman squad
Janet Wanja, Jane Wairimu, Lydia Maiyo, Esther Wangeci, Mercy Moim, Noel Murambi, Everlyne Makuto, Monica Biama, Ruth Jepngetich, Brackcides Khadambi (c), Triza Atuka, Elizabeth Wanyama
Head coach
David Lung'aho

== Awards ==
- MVP
  (Kenya) Everlyne Makuto
- Best setter
  (Kenya) Jane Wairimu
- Best receiver
  (Cameroon) Laetitia Moma Bassoko
- Best libero
  (Kenya) Elizabeth Wanyama
- Best attacker
  (Senegal) Fatou Diuock
- Best blocker
  (Kenya) Ruth Jepngetich
- Best server
  (Algeria) Lydia Oulmou

Source: CAVB.

== See also ==
- 2015 Men's African Volleyball Championship
