= South Africa women's national volleyball team =

National sports team

South Africa
- Association: Volleyball South Africa
- Confederation: CAVB
- FIVB ranking: NR (29 June 2025)

Uniforms
Home	Away	Third

The South Africa women's national volleyball team represents South Africa in international women's volleyball competitions and friendly matches.

Its best result was 4th place at the 2001 African Women's Volleyball Championship in Nigeria.

Its last qualification to the official African Women's Volleyball Championship dates back to 2007 when the team finished 8th.

== African Championship ==
Champions Runners up Third place Fourth place

African Championship record
Year	Round	Position	GP	W	L	SW	SL
(Egypt) 1976	Didn't Compete						
(Tunisia) 1985	Didn't Compete						
(Morocco) 1987	Didn't Compete						
(Mauritius) 1989	Didn't Compete						
(Egypt) 1991	Didn't Compete						
(Nigeria) 1993		8th					
1995	Didn't Compete						
1997		4th					
(Nigeria) 1999	Didn't Compete						
(Nigeria) 2001		4th					
(Kenya) 2003	Didn't Compete						
(Nigeria) 2005	Didn't Compete						
(Kenya) 2007		8th					
(Algeria) 2009	Didn't Compete						
(Kenya) 2011	Didn't Compete						
(Kenya) 2013	Didn't Compete						
(Kenya) 2015	Didn't Compete						
(Cameroon) 2017	Didn't Compete						
Total	4/18	0 Titles					

== African Games ==
Champions Runners up Third place Fourth place

African Games record
Year	Round	Position	GP	W	L	SW	SL
(Algeria) 1978	Didn't Compete						
(Kenya) 1987	Didn't Compete						
(Egypt) 1991	Didn't Compete						
(Zimbabwe) 1995		7th					
(South Africa) 1999		4th					
(Nigeria) 2003		7th					
(Algeria) 2007		6th					
(Mozambique) 2011	Didn't Compete						
(Republic of the Congo) 2015	Didn't Compete						
Total	4/9	0 Titles					
