= 2013 Women's African Volleyball Championship =

Tournament details
- Host country: Kenya
- City: Nairobi
- Dates: 14 – 19 September
- Teams: 6
- Venue: 1 (in 1 host city)

Final positions
- Champions: Kenya (8th title)

Tournament awards
- MVP: (Kenya) Mercy Moim

Tournament statistics
- Matches played: 15

The 2013 Women's African Nations Championship was the 16th edition of the Women's African Volleyball Championship organised by Africa's governing volleyball body, the Confédération Africaine de Volleyball. It was held in Nairobi, Kenya, from 14 to 19 September 2013. The winner qualified for the 2014 World Grand Prix.

Kenya won the championship with Cameroon and Tunisia finishing second and third respectively.

== Competing nations ==
The following national teams have confirmed participation:

- Algeria
- Cameroon
- Egypt
- Kenya
- Senegal
- Tunisia

== Venue ==
Nairobi, Kenya	2013 Women's African Volleyball Championship is located in Kenya
Kasarani Indoor Arena	2013 Women's African Volleyball Championship is located in Kenya
Capacity: 5,000	2013 Women's African Volleyball Championship is located in Kenya

== Format ==
The competition system of the 2013 Women's African Championship is the single Round-Robin system. Each team plays once against each of the 5 remaining teams. Points are accumulated during the whole tournament, and the final ranking is determined by the total points gained.

Pool standing procedure

1. Number of matches won
2. Match points
3. Sets ratio
4. Points ratio
5. Result of the last match between the tied teams

Match won 3–0 or 3–1: 3 match points for the winner, 0 match points for the loser
Match won 3–2: 2 match points for the winner, 1 match point for the loser

== Round-Robin ==
Pos	Team	Pld	W	L	Pts	SW	SL	SR	SPW	SPL	SPR
1	Kenya	5	5	0	15	15	0	MAX	375	279	1.344
2	Cameroon	5	4	1	10	12	7	1.714	424	383	1.107
3	Tunisia	5	3	2	9	11	9	1.222	429	409	1.049
4	Senegal	5	2	3	5	7	11	0.636	364	403	0.903
5	Egypt	5	1	4	4	7	14	0.500	439	461	0.952
6	Algeria	5	0	5	2	4	15	0.267	348	444	0.784

Date		Score		Set 1	Set 2	Set 3	Set 4	Set 5	Total
14 Sep	Tunisia	3–2	Algeria	25–17	22–25	25–12	22–25	15–6	109–85
14 Sep	Cameroon	3–2	Egypt	25–23	21–25	26–24	15–25	15–8	102–105
14 Sep	Senegal	0–3	Kenya	20–25	20–25	16–25			56–75
15 Sep	Algeria	0–3	Senegal	18–25	15–25	19–25			52–75
15 Sep	Cameroon	3–2	Tunisia	25–12	20–25	22–25	25–17	15–10	107–89
15 Sep	Egypt	0–3	Kenya	20–25	20–25	12–25			52–75
16 Sep	Senegal	0–3	Cameroon	17–25	15–25	21–25			53–75
16 Sep	Tunisia	3–0	Egypt	25–21	28–26	25–18			78–65
16 Sep	Kenya	3–0	Algeria	25–19	25–15	25–13			75–47
18 Sep	Algeria	2–3	Egypt	25–20	21–25	19–25	26–24	12–15	103–109
18 Sep	Tunisia	3–1	Senegal	25–14	25–16	18–25	25–22		93–77
18 Sep	Cameroon	0–3	Kenya	22–25	20–25	22–25			64–75
19 Sep	Algeria	0–3	Cameroon	14–25	24–26	23–25			61–76
19 Sep	Egypt	2–3	Senegal	20–25	25–14	25–21	26–28	12–15	108–103
19 Sep	Kenya	3–0	Tunisia	25–17	25–20	25–23			75–60

== Final standing ==
Rank	Team
1st place, gold medalist(s)	Kenya
2nd place, silver medalist(s)	Cameroon
3rd place, bronze medalist(s)	Tunisia
4	Senegal
5	Egypt
6	Algeria

Qualified for the 2014 World Grand Prix

2013 Women's African Volleyball Championship

Kenya
8th title

Team Roster:

Jane Wacu, Everlyne Makuto, Esther Gatere, Diana Khisa, Ruth Jepngetich, Janet Wanja, Violet Makuto, Elizabeth Wanyama (L), Mercy Moim, Brackcides Khadambi, Gaudencia Makokha,

Monica Biama
Head Coach: David Lungaho

== Awards ==
- MVP: (Kenya) Mercy Moim
- Best setter: (Kenya) Jane Wacu
- Best receiver: (Senegal) Binetou Sow
- Best libero: (Kenya) Elizabeth Wanyama
- Best attacker: (Cameroon) Christelle Nana Tchoudjang
- Best blocker: (Cameroon) Esther Eba'a Mballa
- Best server: (Cameroon) Laetitia Moma Bassoko
