= Edith Wisa =

Kenyan volleyball player

Edith Mukuvilani
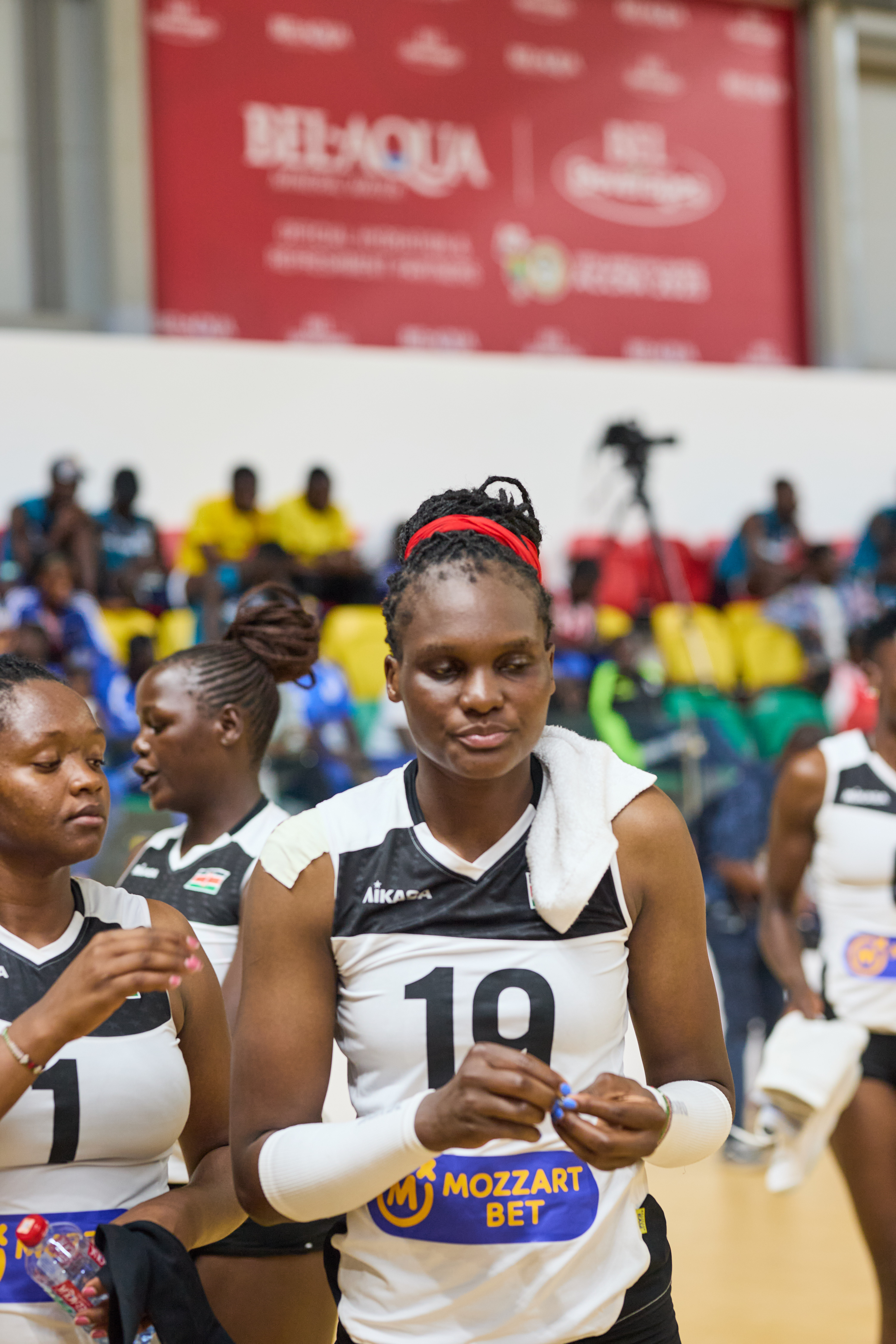
- Born: 20 July 1994 (age 31)
- Known for: representing Kenya at volleyball

Edith Wisah Mukuvilani aka Edith Wisa (born 20 July 1994) is a Kenyan volleyball player in the Kenya women's national volleyball team who has played for Kenya at two Olympics.

== Life ==
Mukuvilani comes from the town of Kakamega and she was born in 1994 and she went to school in Lugulu.

She began to play volleyball professionally for the Kenya Prisons team in the 2013/2014 season.

In 2018 she was invited with the rest of the National team to a celebration meal in Nairobi before the team flew on the first of three flights that would take them to Japan. She was part of the "Malkia Strikers" team with Japheth Munala as head coach that competed in Tokyo at the 2018 Women's world championships.

In 2019 Kenya women won the Volleyball at the 2019 African Games and Mukuvilani was on the team. In that year she transferred from the Kenya Prisons team to the KCB team. She did well and within two years she became the KCB team's captain.

In 2021 she and Lorine Chebet were chosen as the middle blockers by Head coach Paul Bitok in a twelve woman team to compete at the postponed 2020 Olympics in Tokyo. It was the first time that Kenya had qualified since 2003. Bitok chose a similar team to the one that competed at the 2019 FIVB Volleyball World Cup as it had eight players in common. These were Makuvilani, Jane Wacu, Emmaculate Chemtai and Sharon Chepchumba, Mercy Moin, Leonida Kasaya, Lorine Chebet and Agripina Kundu. The team were trained additionally by Luizomar de Moura of Brazil. The Kenyans lost their first match against the home team of Japan.

In 2024 she was in the KCB Bank volleyball team. Japheth Munala became the national team's head coach as Bitok had joined the team's management. Munala again chose Mukuvilani for that year's Africa Volleyball Federation qualifiers.

Kenya qualified again for the Olympics in 2024 and Makuvilani again made the team to go to Paris.
