= 2021 Women's African Nations Volleyball Championship =

African women's volleyball championships

2021 Women's African Nations Championship

Tournament details
- Host country: Rwanda
- City: Kigali
- Dates: 12–20 September
- Teams: 9 (from 1 confederation)
- Venue: 2 (in 1 host city)

Final positions
- Champions: Cameroon (3rd title)
- Runners-up: Kenya
- Third place: Morocco
- Fourth place: Nigeria

Tournament awards
- MVP: (Cameroon) Christelle Tchoudjang Nana
- Best Setter: (Morocco) Alexandra Erhart
- Best OH: (Kenya) Sharon Chepchumba
- Best MB: (Kenya) Gladys Ekaru
- Best Libero: (Morocco) Yousra Souidi

The 2021 Women's African Nations Volleyball Championship is the 20th edition of the Women's African Volleyball Championship, a biennial international volleyball tournament organised by the African Volleyball Confederation (CAVB) with Rwanda Volleyball Federation (FRVB). The tournament is held in Kigali, Rwanda from 12 to 20 September 2021. The top two teams of the tournament will qualify for the 2022 FIVB Volleyball Women's World Championship as the CAVB representatives.

== Qualification ==
9 teams have registered to participate in the 2021 African Championship.

| Means of qualification | Dates | Hosts | Quota | Qualifier(s) |
|---|---|---|---|---|
| Host nation | —N/a | —N/a | 1 | Rwanda |
| 2019 African Championship | 9–14 July 2019 | (Egypt) Cairo | 4 | Cameroon; Kenya; Senegal; Morocco |
| Zone 1 representatives | —N/a | —N/a | 1 | Tunisia |
| Zone 3 representatives | —N/a | —N/a | 1 | Nigeria |
| Zone 4 representatives | —N/a | —N/a | 2 | Burundi; DR Congo |
| Total | | | 9 | |

== Pools composition ==
Ranking from the previous edition was shown in brackets except the host and the teams who did not participate, which were denoted by (–). The host country and the top 8 ranked teams were seed in the Serpentine system. The 4 remaining teams were drawn in Kigali, Rwanda on 11 September 2021.

| Pool A | Pool B |
|---|---|
| Rwanda (Hosts) | Cameroon (1) |
| Senegal (3) | Kenya (2) |
| Morocco (6) | Burundi (–) |
| Nigeria (–) | Tunisia (–) |
| | DR Congo (–) |

== Venue ==
| Kigali, Rwanda | | Kigali (Rwanda) |
| Kigali Arena / KGL | Petit Stade / PTS | Kigali (Rwanda) |
| Capacity: 10,000 | Capacity: Unknown | Kigali (Rwanda) |

== Pool standing procedure ==
1. Number of matches won
2. Match points
3. Sets ratio
4. Points ratio
5. Result of the last match between the tied teams

Match won 3–0 or 3–1: 3 match points for the winner, 0 match points for the loser
Match won 3–2: 2 match points for the winner, 1 match point for the loser.

== Group stage ==
- All times are Central Africa Time (UTC+02:00).

=== Pool A ===
| Pos | Team | Pld | W | L | Pts | SW | SL | SR | SPW | SPL | SPR | Qualification |
|---|---|---|---|---|---|---|---|---|---|---|---|---|
| 1 | Morocco | 2 | 1 | 1 | 3 | 4 | 3 | 1.333 | 168 | 160 | 1.050 | Semifinals |
| 2 | Nigeria | 2 | 1 | 1 | 3 | 3 | 3 | 1.000 | 143 | 131 | 1.092 | Semifinals |
| 3 | Senegal (Note: Rwanda was forfeited by FIVB because Rwanda illegally registered four foreigners without due process) | 2 | 0 | 2 | 0 | 0 | 6 | 0.000 | 109 | 150 | 0.727 | Withdrew |
| 4 | Rwanda (Note: Senegal withdrew from the competition) (H) | 2 | 2 | 0 | 6 | 6 | 1 | 6.000 | 182 | 161 | 1.130 | 9th place |

(H) Host nation
Notes:

| Date | Time | Venue | | Score | | Set 1 | Set 2 | Set 3 | Set 4 | Set 5 | Total | Report |
|---|---|---|---|---|---|---|---|---|---|---|---|---|
| 12 Sep | 14:00 | KGL | Nigeria | 3–0 | Senegal | 25–16 | 25–18 | 25–22 | | | 75–56 | |
| 12 Sep | 18:00 | KGL | Rwanda | 3–1 | Morocco | 25–19 | 25–18 | 32–34 | 25–22 | | 107–93 | |
| 13 Sep | 18:00 | KGL | Nigeria | 0–3 | Rwanda | 22–25 | 23–25 | 23–25 | | | 68–75 | |
| 15 Sep | 14:00 | KGL | Senegal | 0–3 | Morocco | 23–25 | 17–25 | 13–25 | | | 53–75 | |
| 16 Sep (Note: This match was canceled.) | 18:00 | KGL | Rwanda | – | Senegal | – | – | – | | | 0–0 | |
| 17 Sep | 16:00 | KGL | Morocco | – | Nigeria | – | – | – | | | 0–0 | |

=== Pool B ===
| Pos | Team | Pld | W | L | Pts | SW | SL | SR | SPW | SPL | SPR | Qualification |
|---|---|---|---|---|---|---|---|---|---|---|---|---|
| 1 | Cameroon | 3 | 3 | 0 | 9 | 9 | 0 | MAX | 225 | 153 | 1.471 | Semifinals |
| 2 | Kenya | 4 | 3 | 1 | 9 | 9 | 3 | 3.000 | 285 | 206 | 1.383 | Semifinals |
| 3 | Tunisia | 3 | 1 | 2 | 3 | 3 | 6 | 0.500 | 185 | 200 | 0.925 | 5th place |
| 4 | DR Congo | 3 | 1 | 2 | 3 | 3 | 6 | 0.500 | 168 | 196 | 0.857 | 5th place |
| 5 | Burundi | 3 | 0 | 3 | 0 | 0 | 9 | 0.000 | 117 | 225 | 0.520 | 7th place |

| Date | Time | Venue | | Score | | Set 1 | Set 2 | Set 3 | Set 4 | Set 5 | Total | Report |
|---|---|---|---|---|---|---|---|---|---|---|---|---|
| 12 Sep | 12:00 | KGL | Burundi | 0–3 | DR Congo | 18–25 | 15–25 | 13–25 | | | 46–75 | |
| 12 Sep | 16:00 | KGL | Cameroon | 3–0 | Kenya | 25–20 | 25–21 | 25–19 | | | 75–60 | |
| 13 Sep | 10:00 | KGL | Tunisia | 0–3 | Cameroon | 15–25 | 18–25 | 17–25 | | | 50–75 | |
| 13 Sep | 12:00 | PTS | DR Congo | 0–3 | Kenya | 12–25 | 12–25 | 19–25 | | | 43–75 | |
| 15 Sep | 12:00 | KGL | Cameroon | 3–0 | Burundi | 25–15 | 25–14 | 25–14 | | | 75–43 | |
| 15 Sep | 16:00 | KGL | Kenya | 3–0 | Tunisia | 25–20 | 25–19 | 25–21 | | | 75–60 | |
| 16 Sep | 14:00 | KGL | Burundi | 0–3 | Kenya | 8–25 | 9–25 | 11–25 | | | 28–75 | |
| 16 Sep | 16:00 | KGL | DR Congo | 0–3 | Tunisia | 17–25 | 16–25 | 17–25 | | | 50–75 | |
| 17 Sep (Note: This match was canceled.) | 14:00 | KGL | Cameroon | – | DR Congo | – | – | – | | | 0–0 | |
| 17 Sep | 18:00 | KGL | Tunisia | – | Burundi | – | – | – | | | 0–0 | |

== Final round ==
- All times are Central Africa Time (UTC+02:00).

=== 5th place match ===
| Date | Time | Venue | | Score | | Set 1 | Set 2 | Set 3 | Set 4 | Set 5 | Total | Report |
|---|---|---|---|---|---|---|---|---|---|---|---|---|
| 19 Sep | 14.00 | KGL | Tunisia | 3–0 | DR Congo | 25–17 | 25–11 | 25–20 | | | 75–48 | |

=== Final Four ===
Semifinals
19 September – Kigali
Morocco | 0
Kenya | 3
19 September – Kigali
Cameroon | 3
Nigeria | 0

Final
19 September – Kigali
Kenya | 1
Cameroon | 3
3rd place match
19 September – Kigali
Morocco | 3
Nigeria | 0

==== Semifinals ====
| Date | Time | Venue | | Score | | Set 1 | Set 2 | Set 3 | Set 4 | Set 5 | Total | Report |
|---|---|---|---|---|---|---|---|---|---|---|---|---|
| 19 Sep | 10.00 | KGL | Morocco | 0–3 | Kenya | 12–25 | 21–25 | 11–25 | | | 44–75 | |
| 19 Sep | 12.00 | KGL | Cameroon | 3–0 | Nigeria | 25–13 | 35–33 | 25–13 | | | 85–59 | |

==== 3rd place match ====
| Date | Time | Venue | | Score | | Set 1 | Set 2 | Set 3 | Set 4 | Set 5 | Total | Report |
|---|---|---|---|---|---|---|---|---|---|---|---|---|
| 19 Sep | 16.00 | KGL | Morocco | 3–0 | Nigeria | 25–19 | 25–17 | 25–18 | | | 75–54 | |

==== Final ====
| Date | Time | Venue | | Score | | Set 1 | Set 2 | Set 3 | Set 4 | Set 5 | Total | Report |
|---|---|---|---|---|---|---|---|---|---|---|---|---|
| 19 Sep | 18.00 | KGL | Kenya | 1–3 | Cameroon | 21–25 | 23–25 | 25–15 | 23–25 | | 92–90 | |

== Final standing ==
| Rank | Team |
|---|---|
| 1st place, gold medalist(s) | Cameroon |
| 2nd place, silver medalist(s) | Kenya |
| 3rd place, bronze medalist(s) | Morocco |
| 4 | Nigeria |
| 5 | Tunisia |
| 6 | DR Congo |
| 7 | Senegal |
| 8 | Burundi |
| 9 | Rwanda |

| Qualified for the 2022 World Championship |

2021 Women's African Nations champions

Cameroon
3rd title

== Awards ==
- Most valuable player
  (Cameroon) Christelle Tchoudjang Nana
- Best spiker
  (Kenya) Sharon Chepchumba
- Best blocker
  (Kenya) Gladys Ekaru
- Best server
  (Cameroon) Laetitia Moma Bassoko
- Best setter
  (Morocco) Alexandra Erhart
- Best receiver
  (Kenya) Mercy Moim
- Best libero
  (Morocco) Yousra Souidi

== See also ==
- 2021 Men's African Nations Volleyball Championship
