= Women's African Nations Volleyball Championship =

Annual sports competition, founded 1976

- Most recent season or competition: 2026 Women's African Nations Volleyball Championship
- Sport: Volleyball
- Founded: 1976; 50 years ago
- First season: 1976
- No. of teams: 16 (Finals)
- Continent: CAVB (Africa)
- Most recent champions: Egypt (4th title)
- Most titles: Kenya (10 titles)

The African Women's Volleyball Championship is the official competition for senior women's national volleyball teams of Africa, organized by the African Volleyball Confederation (CAVB). The tournament is currently held biannually. The current champion is Egypt, which won its fourth title at the 2026 tournament in Nairobi, Kenya and thus have qualified automatically to the 2028 Summer Olympic Games.

== Summary ==
Year	Host	Final			3rd place match			Teams
Year	Host	Champions	Score	Runners-up	3rd place	Score	4th place	Teams
1976; Details	(Egypt); Port Said	Egypt	Round-robin	Tunisia	Morocco	Round-robin	Algeria	6
1985; Details	(Tunisia); Tunis	Tunisia	Round-robin	Egypt	Cameroon	Round-robin	Algeria	4
1987; Details	(Morocco); Rabat	Tunisia	3–2	Morocco	Egypt	Round-robin	Algeria	4
1989; Details	(Mauritius); Port Louis	Egypt	3–0	Mauritius	Madagascar	3–1	Kenya	4
1991; Details	(Egypt); Cairo	Kenya		Egypt	Cameroon		Ghana	8
1993; Details	(Nigeria); Lagos	Kenya	3–0	Egypt	Nigeria		Cameroon	10
1995; Details	(Kenya); Nairobi	Kenya		Nigeria	Tunisia		Angola	6
1997; Details	(Kenya); Nairobi	Kenya		Nigeria	Angola		South Africa	5
1999; Details	(Nigeria); Lagos	Tunisia	Round-robin	Cameroon	Nigeria	Round-robin	Guinea	4
2001; Details	(Nigeria); Port Harcourt	Seychelles	3–0	Nigeria	Cameroon	Round-robin	South Africa	4
2003; Details	(Kenya); Nairobi	Egypt	3–1	Kenya	Cameroon	3–1	Algeria	8
2005; Details	(Nigeria); Abuja	Kenya	3–1	Nigeria	Egypt	3–2	Tunisia	8
2007; Details	(Kenya); Nairobi	Kenya	3–0	Algeria	Tunisia	3–1	Egypt	10
2009; Details	(Algeria); Blida	Algeria	3–0	Tunisia	Cameroon	3–0	Senegal	6
2011; Details	(Kenya); Nairobi	Kenya	3–1	Algeria	Egypt	3–2	Senegal	9
2013; Details	(Kenya); Nairobi	Kenya	Round-robin	Cameroon	Tunisia	Round-robin	Senegal	6
2015; Details	(Kenya); Nairobi	Kenya	3–0	Algeria	Cameroon	3–2	Senegal	8
2017; Details	(Cameroon); Yaoundé	Cameroon	3–0	Kenya	Egypt	3–0	Senegal	9
2019; Details	(Egypt); Cairo	Cameroon	3–2	Kenya	Senegal	3–1	Egypt	7
2021; Details	(Rwanda); Kigali	Cameroon	3–1	Kenya	Morocco	3–0	Nigeria	9
2023; Details	(Cameroon); Yaoundé	Kenya	3–0	Egypt	Cameroon	3–1	Rwanda	12
2026; Details	(Kenya); Nairobi	Egypt	3–0	Kenya	Cameroon	3–0	Rwanda	15

== Medal summary ==
Rank	Nation	Gold	Silver	Bronze	Total
1	Kenya	10	5	0	15
2	Egypt	4	4	4	12
3	Cameroon	3	2	8	13
4	Tunisia	3	2	3	8
5	Algeria	1	3	0	4
6	Seychelles	1	0	0	1
7	Nigeria	0	4	2	6
8	Morocco	0	1	2	3
9	Mauritius	0	1	0	1
10	Angola	0	0	1	1
10	Madagascar	0	0	1	1
10	Senegal	0	0	1	1
Totals (12 entries)		22	22	22	66

== Participating nations ==
Nation	(Egypt) 1976	(Tunisia) 1985	(Morocco) 1987	(Mauritius) 1989	(Egypt) 1991	(Nigeria) 1993	(Kenya) 1995	(Kenya) 1997	(Nigeria) 1999	(Nigeria) 2001	(Kenya) 2003	(Nigeria) 2005	(Kenya) 2007	(Algeria) 2009	(Kenya) 2011	(Kenya) 2013	(Kenya) 2015	(Cameroon) 2017	(Egypt) 2019	(Rwanda) 2021	(Cameroon) 2023	(Kenya) 2026	Years
Algeria	4th	4th									4th		2nd	1st	2nd	6th	2nd	6th	5th		5th		11
Angola							4th	3rd															2
Botswana						10th						7th	7th	5th	7th		8th	8th	7th				8
Burkina Faso																					10th	15th	2
Burundi																				8th	11th		2
Cameroon		3rd	4th		3rd	4th			2nd	3rd	3rd	5th	6th	3rd	5th	2nd	3rd	1st	1st	1st	3rd	3rd	17
DR Congo					6th						7th							9th		6th			4
Ivory Coast												8th											1
Egypt	1st	2nd	3rd	1st	2nd	2nd					1st	3rd	4th		3rd	5th		3rd	4th		2nd	1st	15
Ethiopia					8th	5th																	2
Ghana					4th	9th																	2
Guinea	6th								4th														2
Kenya				4th	1st	1st	1st	1st			2nd	1st	1st		1st	1st	1st	2nd	2nd	2nd	1st	2nd	15
Lesotho																					12th		1
Madagascar				3rd	7th																		2
Mali																					9th		1
Mauritius				2nd		7th	5th										7th						4
Morocco	3rd		2nd									6th		6th			6th		6th	3rd	7th		8
Mozambique								5th															1
Nigeria						3rd	2nd	2nd	3rd	2nd		2nd			8th			7th		4th	6th		10
Rwanda													10th		9th					DQ	4th		4
Senegal											8th		5th	4th	4th	4th	4th	4th	3rd	7th			9
Seychelles										1st	6th												2
South Africa						8th		4th		4th			8th										4
Sudan	5th																						1
Uganda													9th								8th		2
Tunisia	2nd	1st	1st		5th	6th	3rd		1st		5th	4th	3rd	2nd	6th	3rd	5th	5th		5th			16
Zambia							6th																1
Total	6	4	4	4	8	10	6	5	4	4	8	8	10	6	9	6	8	9	7	9	12	15	

== See also ==
- Men's African Volleyball Championship
- Volleyball at the African Games
- Women's U23 African Volleyball Championship
- Women's Africa Volleyball Championship U20
- Girls' Africa Volleyball Championship U18
