= Agripina Kundu =

Kenyan volleyball player (born 1993)

Personal information
- Full name: Agripina Khayesi Kundu
- Nationality: Kenyan
- Born: 24 April 1993 (age 33)
- Height: 165 cm (5 ft 5 in)
- Weight: 66 kg (146 lb)
- Spike: 294 cm (116 in)
- Block: 288 cm (113 in)

Volleyball information
- Position: libero
- Number: 16 (national team)

Career
Years	Teams
2014	Kenya Pipeline Company

National team
2014	Kenya

Agripina Khayesi Kundu (born 24 April 1993) is a Kenyan volleyball player, playing as a libero. She is part of the Kenya women's national volleyball team.

She participated at the 2014 FIVB Volleyball World Grand Prix. On club level she played for Kenya Pipeline Company in 2014 after a company director offered her a permanent job at the end of a match. In the same year she began to represent her country at volleyball.

She was chosen to represent Kenya at the 2020 Summer Olympics. Mercy Moim was chosen to captain Kenya's team. It was the first time that Kenya had qualified for the Olympics since 2003. It was a similar team to the one that competed at the 2019 FIVB Volleyball World Cup as it had eight players in common. These were Jane Wacu, blocker Edith Mukuvilani, Emmaculate Chemtai, Sharon Chepchumba, Mercy Moim, Leonida Kasaya, Lorine Chebet and Kundu. The team were trained additionally by Luizomar de Moura of Brazil. The team lost their first match against Japan in straight sets.
