= Catherine Wanjiru =

Kenyan volleyball player (born 1978)

Personal information
- Nationality: Kenyan
- Born: 7 August 1978 (age 48)
- Height: 1.78 m (5 ft 10 in)
- Weight: 80 kg (180 lb)
- Spike: 285 cm (112 in)
- Block: 265 cm (104 in)

Volleyball information
- Number: 6

Career
Years	Teams
2004	Kenya Pipelines

National team
2004	Kenya Kenya

Catherine Wanjiru (born 7 August 1978) was a Kenyan female volleyball player. She was part of the Kenya women's national volleyball team.

She participated in the 2002 FIVB Volleyball Women's World Championship. She competed with the national team at the 2004 Summer Olympics in Athens, Greece. She played with Kenya Pipelines in 2004.

In 2007 Wanijuru took part of the Kenyan Team who competed for the FIVB Women's World Cup. Nearly all the other Kenyan internationals came from the Kenya Prisons or the Kenya Commercial Bank volleyball teams (except for Edinah Rotich) including Jane Wacu, Janet Wanja, Mercy Moim and Brackcides Khadambi.

== Clubs ==
- Kenya Pipelines (2004)
