= Wanjala =

Wanjala is a surname. Notable people with the surname include:

- Doris Wanjala (1966–2007), Kenyan volleyball player
- Salome Wanjala (born 1985), Kenyan volleyball player
- Smokin Wanjala, Kenyan lawyer and associate justice of the Supreme Court of Kenya
- Tecla Namachanja Wanjala (born 1962), Kenyan conflict resolution, post-conflict rehabilitation, and development worker
