= 2003 Women's African Volleyball Championship =

African volleyball championship

Tournament details
- Host country: Kenya
- City: Nairobi
- Dates: 16 – 23 August
- Teams: 8
- Venue: 1 (in 1 host city)

Final positions
- Champions: Egypt (3rd title)

Tournament awards
- MVP: (Egypt) Tahani Toson

Tournament statistics
- Matches played: 18

The 2003 Women's African Nations Championship was the 11th edition of the Women's African Volleyball Championship organised by Africa's governing volleyball body, the Confédération Africaine de Volleyball. It was held in Nairobi, Kenya, from 16 to 23 August 2003.

Egypt won the championship defeating Kenya in the final, while Cameroon defeated Algeria to finish third.

== Competing nations ==
The following national teams have confirmed participation:

- Algeria
- Cameroon
- DR Congo
- Egypt
- Kenya
- Senegal
- Seychelles
- Tunisia

== Venue ==
| Nairobi, Kenya | 2003 Women's African Volleyball Championship is located in Kenya |
| Kasarani Indoor Arena | 2003 Women's African Volleyball Championship is located in Kenya |
| Capacity: 5,000 | 2003 Women's African Volleyball Championship is located in Kenya |

== Format ==
The tournament is played in two stages. In the first stage, the participants are divided in two groups. A single round-robin format is played within each group to determine the teams' group position (as per procedure below).

The second stage is a knockout format, the top two teams in each group advance to the semifinals, third placed teams in each group play for 5th-6th and fourth placed teams in each group play for 7th-8th place. Winners of the semifinals play the final, while losers play for third and fourth places.

=== Pool standing procedure ===
1. Match points (win = 2 points, loss = 1 point)
2. Number of matches won
3. Sets ratio
4. Points ratio

== Pool composition ==
The drawing of lots was held in Nairobi, Kenya on 15 August 2003.

| Pool A | Pool B |
|---|---|
| Kenya | Seychelles |
| DR Congo | Senegal |
| Tunisia | Cameroon |
| Egypt | Algeria |

== Group stage ==
=== Group A ===
| Pos | Team | Pld | W | L | Pts | SW | SL | SR | SPW | SPL | SPR | Qualification |
|---|---|---|---|---|---|---|---|---|---|---|---|---|
| 1 | Egypt | 3 | 3 | 0 | 6 | 9 | 2 | 4.500 | 257 | 218 | 1.179 | Semifinals |
| 2 | Kenya | 3 | 2 | 1 | 5 | 8 | 3 | 2.667 | 254 | 200 | 1.270 | Semifinals |
| 3 | Tunisia | 3 | 1 | 2 | 4 | 3 | 6 | 0.500 | 201 | 202 | 0.995 | |
| 4 | DR Congo | 3 | 0 | 3 | 3 | 0 | 9 | 0.000 | 133 | 225 | 0.591 | |

| Date | Time | | Score | | Set 1 | Set 2 | Set 3 | Set 4 | Set 5 | Total | Report |
|---|---|---|---|---|---|---|---|---|---|---|---|
| 16 Aug | | Egypt | 3–0 | Tunisia | 29–27 | 25–18 | 25–21 | | | 79–66 | |
| 16 Aug | | DR Congo | 0–3 | Kenya | 9–25 | 13–25 | 15–25 | | | 37–75 | |
| 17 Aug | | Tunisia | 3–0 | DR Congo | 25–16 | 25–22 | 25–10 | | | 75–48 | |
| 17 Aug | | Kenya | 2–3 | Egypt | 15–25 | 25–27 | 25–12 | 25–23 | 14–16 | 104–103 | |
| 18 Aug | | Egypt | 3–0 | DR Congo | 25–21 | 25–16 | 25–11 | | | 75–48 | |
| 18 Aug | | Tunisia | 0–3 | Kenya | 17–25 | 20–25 | 23–25 | | | 60–75 | |

=== Group B ===
| Pos | Team | Pld | W | L | Pts | SW | SL | SR | SPW | SPL | SPR | Qualification |
|---|---|---|---|---|---|---|---|---|---|---|---|---|
| 1 | Cameroon | 3 | 3 | 0 | 6 | 9 | 2 | 4.500 | 268 | 219 | 1.224 | Semifinals |
| 2 | Algeria | 3 | 2 | 1 | 5 | 7 | 4 | 1.750 | 250 | 227 | 1.101 | Semifinals |
| 3 | Seychelles | 3 | 1 | 2 | 4 | 4 | 6 | 0.667 | 206 | 223 | 0.924 | |
| 4 | Senegal | 3 | 0 | 3 | 3 | 1 | 9 | 0.111 | 194 | 249 | 0.779 | |

| Date | Time | | Score | | Set 1 | Set 2 | Set 3 | Set 4 | Set 5 | Total | Report |
|---|---|---|---|---|---|---|---|---|---|---|---|
| 16 Aug | | Senegal | 0–3 | Algeria | 25–27 | 16–25 | 10–25 | | | 51–77 | |
| 16 Aug | | Cameroon | 3–0 | Seychelles | 25–13 | 25–18 | 25–20 | | | 75–51 | |
| 17 Aug | | Algeria | 3–1 | Seychelles | 25–18 | 25–18 | 19–25 | 25–19 | | 94–80 | |
| 17 Aug | | Senegal | 1–3 | Cameroon | 22–25 | 25–22 | 23–25 | 19–25 | | 89–97 | |
| 18 Aug | | Cameroon | 3–1 | Algeria | 25–16 | 25–20 | 21–25 | 25–18 | | 96–79 | |
| 18 Aug | | Seychelles | 3–0 | Senegal | 25–22 | 25–19 | 25–13 | | | 75–54 | |

== Final round ==
Semi finals
20 August
Egypt | 3
Algeria | 2
20 August
Cameroon | 0
Kenya | 3

Final
23 August
Egypt | 3
Kenya | 1
3rd place
22 August
Algeria | 1
Cameroon | 3

=== Semifinals ===
| Date | Time | | Score | | Set 1 | Set 2 | Set 3 | Set 4 | Set 5 | Total | Report |
|---|---|---|---|---|---|---|---|---|---|---|---|
| 20 Aug | | Egypt | 3–2 | Algeria | 21–25 | 25–19 | 25–18 | 18–25 | 15–10 | 104–97 | Report |
| 20 Aug | | Cameroon | 0–3 | Kenya | 12–25 | 17–25 | 21–25 | | | 50–75 | Report |

=== 7th place match ===
| Date | Time | | Score | | Set 1 | Set 2 | Set 3 | Set 4 | Set 5 | Total | Report |
|---|---|---|---|---|---|---|---|---|---|---|---|
| 20 Aug | | DR Congo | 3–2 | Senegal | 28–26 | 25–22 | 23–25 | 18–25 | 15–12 | 109–110 | Report |

=== 5th place match ===
| Date | Time | | Score | | Set 1 | Set 2 | Set 3 | Set 4 | Set 5 | Total | Report |
|---|---|---|---|---|---|---|---|---|---|---|---|
| 20 Aug | | Tunisia | 3–0 | Seychelles | 26–24 | 25–18 | 30–28 | | | 81–70 | Report |

=== 3rd place match ===
| Date | Time | | Score | | Set 1 | Set 2 | Set 3 | Set 4 | Set 5 | Total | Report |
|---|---|---|---|---|---|---|---|---|---|---|---|
| 22 Aug | | Algeria | 1–3 | Cameroon | 22–25 | 16–25 | 25–20 | 20–25 | | 83–95 | |

=== Final ===
| Date | Time | | Score | | Set 1 | Set 2 | Set 3 | Set 4 | Set 5 | Total | Report |
|---|---|---|---|---|---|---|---|---|---|---|---|
| 23 Aug | | Egypt | 3–1 | Kenya | 25–19 | 22–25 | 29–27 | 25–19 | | 101–90 | |

== Final standing ==
Tournament winner qualify for the 2003 FIVB World Cup.

| Rank | Team |
|---|---|
| 1st place, gold medalist(s) | Egypt |
| 2nd place, silver medalist(s) | Kenya |
| 3rd place, bronze medalist(s) | Cameroon |
| 4 | Algeria |
| 5 | Tunisia |
| 6 | Seychelles |
| 7 | DR Congo |
| 8 | Senegal |

Source: CAVB.

2003 Women's African champions

Egypt
3rd title

== Awards ==
- MVP
  (Egypt) Tahani Toson
- Best setter
  (Cameroon) Rose Beleng À Ngon
- Best receiver
  (Kenya) Mercy Wesutila
- Best defender
  (Egypt) Sara Talaat Aly
- Best scorer
  (Egypt) Tahani Toson
- Best attacker
  (Kenya) Dorcas Nakhomicha Ndasaba
- Best blocker
  (Algeria) Lydia Oulmou
- Best server
  (Tunisia) Arabia Rafrafi

Source: CAVB.
