= Brackcides Khadambi =

Kenyan volleyball player

Personal information
- Full name: Brackcides Agala Khadambi
- Nationality: Kenyan
- Born: 14 May 1984 (age 42)
- Height: 1.80 m (5 ft 11 in)
- Weight: 69 kg (152 lb)
- Spike: 310 cm (122 in)
- Block: 300 cm (118 in)

Volleyball information
- Current club: (France) VBC Chamalières
- Number: 15

Career
- Years: Team
- 2010: Kenya Prisons

National team
- Years: Team
- 2010: Kenya

Brackcides Agala Khadambi (born 14 May 1984) is a Kenyan female volleyball player. She was captain of the Kenya women's national volleyball team and she competed in beach volleyball at the 2020 Summer Olympics.

== Life ==
She was born in 1984. She has been given the nickname of "Blackie".

In 2007 she became better known after Japanese coach Sadatoshi Sugawara discovered her. Sugawara had seen her training and he was surprised to find that she was not in the provisional national squad for the World Cup. Sigawara had her training with the national squad the next day and she joined the surprised team to play at the 2007 FIVB World Cup in Japan. After the competition she was invited to stay in Japan where she gained three months of training with the Hitachi team.

During training not all the team bonded with her but Dorcas Ndasaba was very welcoming and she became her supporter as Khadambi built up her place within the team. Meanwhile, she was in Turkey in 2009 where she played for the Pursaklav team. She participated in the 2010 FIVB Volleyball Women's World Championship.

From 2014 to 2016 she was playing in France for the Chamalieres team, whilst also serving as the captain of the National side. In 2015 she was the captain as the team refused to play in Canberra after several victories. The players were annoyed that they had not been paid money that had been promised by the KVF. The boycott was successful and the team played and won against Peru. The KVF were not pleased and when the team's were announced for the 2016 Summer Olympics neither Khadambi or her assistant Janet Wanja were asked to the qualifying matches.

She played with Kenya Prisons. In 2019 she led Kenya Prisons to win the Kenyan Nation League at the Kasarani Indoor Arena and she became Kenya's "Most Valuable Player". The chosen players names for the Olympics were revealed on 26 June 2021. Paul Bitok's Olympic team included the veterans Mercy Moim and Jane Wacu but former players Violet Makuto, Elizabeth Wanyama and Agala (aka Khadambi) were not included. However Khadambi will be in Tokyo, as she and Gaudencia Makokha, make up Kenya's beach volleyball team. She was included after Makokha's regular partner Naomi Too was injured and she could not make the Olympic trials. She and Makokha competed initially with the teams from Brazil, the United States and Latvia in pool D.

== Clubs ==
- Kenya Prisons (2010)
- (France) VBC Chamalières (2014)
