= Paul Bitok (volleyball) =

Kenyan former volleyball player and coach

- Born: 1974 (age 51–52); Simat in Uasin Gishu County
- Education: Kapsabet Boys High School
- Occupations: bank clerk, sportsman and coach
- Employer: Kenya Commercial Bank et al
- Height: 2 m (6 ft 7 in)
- Spouse: Jennifer Jelagat Bitok
- Children: 3

Paul Bitok (born 1974) is a Kenyan volleyball player and the former coach of the Rwanda women's national volleyball team and the Kenya women's national volleyball team. He was the head coach of the Kenya women's national volleyball team when it qualified for the 2020 Summer Olympics, although before their first match, Brazilian coach Luizomar de Moura was announced as Kenya's head volleyball coach.

== Life ==
Bitok was born in Simat in Uasin Gishu County to a sporting family. He grew to be two metres tall and he was encouraged at Kapsabet High School to play basketball with the possibility of playing for an American team. Bitok preferred volleyball as there were fewer rules and it could be played with basic equipment. His hometown of Simat did not have basketball facilities but volleyball had a local following. Many of the national players came from Simat. When he was nineteen he was playing in the national league and he went to work as a bank clerk for the Kenya Commercial Bank as he played for their volleyball team.

He was the first Kenyan volleyball player to be employed by a foreign team. He was playing in Tunisia in 2003 and he later moved to play in Croatia. He returned to Kenya where he stopped playing but he was still involved in sports administration. In 2005 he returned to the Kenya Commercial Bank as their chief volleyball coach. The team was fourth in the national league, but the following year they were the best team in Africa and he was asked to be an assistant coach to Sadatoshi Sugawara for Kenya's national team. This was a step up and in 2008 he was headhunted by Rwanda to be their national coach, but he turned down the offer to go to Budapest to learn more about sports coaching. With his new expertise, he returned to Rwanda where he introduced training from an early age. Camps were established in the provinces where young players could be developed. When he returned in 2020 Rwanda had teams competing internationally in every age category and the national team were the champions of Africa.

In January 2020 he was named "Coach of the Year" at the Mombasa Sports Club during the SOYA awards.

Under Bitok's leadership, Kenya's women's volleyball team the Malkia Strikers won the gold medal at the African Games and they qualified for the postponed 2020 Summer Olympics which was the first time in sixteen years. The chosen players' names were revealed on 26 June 2021. Bitok chose the veteran Mercy Moim as captain and veteran Jane Wacu also made the team, but former players Violet Makuto and Elizabeth Wanyama were not included. The team received additional coaching from six Brazilian coaches who visited Kenya and the team was then sent to Nairobi where they received additional coaching from the Brazilian coach Luizomar de Moura. The other teams in their group are the home teams of Japan, Serbia, Brazil, Korea, and the Dominican Republic.

The team was waved away from Nairobi by President Uhuru Kenyatta for the Olympics in Tokyo. They travelled in three batches to try and minimise the chances of being affected by the COVID-19 pandemic. They would train for two weeks in Kurumu city but Bitok lost three days of training due to the phased arrival. The team's opening match was on July 25 in Tokyo against Japan. Surprisingly Bitok was not at the match's touchline, as Luizomar de Moura was announced as Kenya's head volleyball coach. De Moura spoke to the press via the team manager. The team lost their first match against Japan in straight sets.

== Private life ==
Bitok is married to Jennifer Jelagat Bitok and they have two daughters and a son.
