= Lorine Chebet =

Kenyan volleyball player

Personal information
- Full name: Lorine Chebet Kaei
- Nationality: Kenyan
- Born: 8 October 1999 (age 25); Mount Elgon District
- Height: 1.79 m (5 ft 10 in)

Lorine Chebet Kaei (born 8 October 1999) is a Kenyan volleyball player who has represented her country internationally including at the Tokyo and Paris Olympics. She has played for Kenya Prisons and Kenya Commercial Bank Women's Volleyball Teams.

== Life ==
Chebet was born in 1999 in Mount Elgon District in Kenya and she attended Kwanthanze Secondary School in Machakos. She has played for Kenya Prisons and left for an unremarkable stint at Kenya Commercial Bank Women's Volleyball Team while the Prisons team won the Federation title that year. She left the KCB team to attend the Prisons Training College and she graduated in August 2020 as she returned to the Kenya Prisons team.

In 2021 the Kenyan national head coach Paul Bitok announced a twelve woman team to compete at the postponed 2020 Olympics in Tokyo. It was the first time that Kenya had qualified for the Olympics since 2003. Bitok chose a similar Malkia Strikers team to the one that had won the 2019 FIVB Volleyball World Cup The Olympic team had eight players in common. These were middle blockers Chebet and Edith Wisa as well as Jane Wacu, Emmaculate Chemtai, Mercy Moin, Leonida Kasaya, Sharon Chepchumba and Agripina Kundu. The team were trained additionally in Nairobi by Brazilian coach Luizomar de Moura. The Kenyans lost their first match against the home team of Japan and the other four matches against Serbia, Brazil, Korea and the Dominican Republic.

In 2022 she went to Europe with the national team to compete at the 2022 FIVB Women's Volleyball World Championship which was hosted by the Netherlands and Poland.

In 2024 she played with the Malkia Strikers at the Paris Olympics. Chebet was one of the few Kenyan volleyballers who were at their second olympics. The others were Edith Wisa and Sharon Chepchumba. She and Meldina Sande were the only players chosen from the Prisons team. The team was in pool B and they played three matches in Paris. They played against Brazil, Poland and Japan and they lost all three matches with a repeated score of 3–0.
