= Nagwa Fouad (volleyball) =

Egyptian volleyball player (born 1983)

Personal information
- Nationality: Egyptian
- Born: 8 December 1983 (age 42)
- Height: 1.72 m (5 ft 8 in)
- Weight: 62 kg (137 lb)
- Spike: 282 cm (111 in)
- Block: 275 cm (108 in)

Volleyball information
- Current club: Sporting, Alexandria
- Number: 5 (national team)

National team
2002	Egypt

Nagwa Fouad (born 8 December 1983) is a retired Egyptian female volleyball player, who played as a middle blocker.

She was part of the Egypt women's national volleyball team at the 2002 FIVB Volleyball Women's World Championship in Germany. On club level she played with Sporting, Alexandria.

== Clubs ==
- Sporting, Alexandria (2002)
