= Sandra Ozabor =

Nigerian volleyball player

Personal information
- Full name: Sandra Ehinomen Ozabor
- Nationality: Nigeria
- Born: November 4, 1997 (age 28)
- Hometown: Benin City
- Height: 182 cm (6 ft 0 in)
- Weight: 63 kg (139 lb)
- Spike: 290
- Block: 270

Volleyball information
- Position: Middle blocker
- Current club: Nigeria Security and Civil Defense Corp (NSCDC)

Sandra Ozabor (born November 4, 1997, in Benin City) is a Nigerian volleyball player who plays as a middle blocker for Nigeria security and civil defense corp (NSCDC) and Nigeria women's national volleyball team.

== Career history ==
=== Nigeria national team ===
She represented Nigeria at the 2019 African Games in Rabat, Morocco.

Ozabor was part of the Nigeria women volleyball team that plays Tokyo 2020 Olympic qualifiers in Cameroon which takes place from 2 January to 9 January 2020.

Sandra Ozabor was part of the 19 volleyball players that Samuel Ajayi named to represent Nigeria for the 21st African Women's Volleyball Championship which takes place from 14 August to 29 August 2023 in Yaounde, Cameroon.

She was again part of the volleyball players that represent Nigeria during the 13th African Games in Ghana which takes place from 8 March to 23 March 2024.
