= Chege =

Chege is a surname of Kenyan origin that may refer to:

- Laban Chege (born 1969), Kenyan long-distance runner
- Lucy Chege (born 1976), Kenyan volleyball player
- Sabina Wanjiru Chege (born 1972), Kenyan politician
- Herman Njoroge Chege (born 1988), Kenyan-American polymath

== See also ==
- Ndunyu Chege, Kenyan settlement

, Gerald Chege, Kenyan born Artist (1972)
