= Truphosa Lai =

Kenyan volleyball player (born 1969)

Personal information
- Nationality: Kenyan
- Born: 15 February 1969 (age 57)
- Height: 180 m (590 ft 7 in)

Volleyball information
- Number: 9 (national team)

Career
- Years: Team
- 1994: Kenya Posta

National team
- Years: Team
- 1994: Kenya

Truphosa Lai (born 15 February 1969) is a retired Kenyan female volleyball player. She was part of the Kenya women's national volleyball team.

She participated in the 1994 FIVB Volleyball Women's World Championship. On club level she played with Kenya Posta.

== Clubs ==
- Kenya Posta (1994)
