= Sharon Chepchumba =

Kenyan volleyball player (born 1998)

- Born: 26 October 1998; Trans-Nzoia County
- Other name: "Chumba"
- Education: in Machakos County
- Known for: Kenyan National Volleyball player

Sharon Chepchumba Kiprono aka "Chumba" (born October 26, 1998) is a Kenyan volleyball player. She has represented Kenya at World Championships and at the Tokyo and Paris Olympics. She has played for a team in Greece and in 2024 she moved to Turkey.

== Life ==
Chepchumba was born in 1998 in Trans-Nzoia county. She played football at Tartar Secondary School and she later moved to Kwanthanze Secondary School in Machakos County.

She started her volleyball career in 2017 when she played for the Kenya Prisons team. She later moved to the Kenya Pipeline team.

In 2021 the Kenyan national head coach Paul Bitok announced a twelve woman team to compete at the postponed 2020 Olympics in Tokyo. It was the first time that Kenya had qualified for the Olympics since 2003. Bitok chose a similar Malkia Strikers team to the one that won the 2019 FIVB Volleyball World Cup The Olympic team had eight players in common. These were Edith Mukuvilani, Jane Wacu, Emmaculate Chemtai, Mercy Moin, Leonida Kasaya, Lorine Chebet and Agripina Kundu. The team were trained additionally by Luizomar de Moura of Brazil which she appreciated. The Kenyans lost their first match against the home team of Japan and the other four matches. Chumba scored 59 points during matches and realised that Kenya could win matches at that level.

In 2022 she left the Kenya Commercial Bank team and moved to the Greek Aris Thessaloniki Volleyball Club after she played for Kenya at the World Championship.

In 2024 she played with the Malkia Strikers at the Paris Olympics. Chepchumba was one of the few Kenyan volleyballers who were at their second olympics. The others were KCB teammate Edith Wisa and Lorine Chebet. The team was in pool B and they played three matches in Paris. They played against Brazil, Poland and Japan and they lost all three matches with a score of 3–0.

At the end of that year, Chepchumba went to play in Turkey for the Edremit Bld. Altinoluk team.
