= Africa Volleyball Championship =

Africa Volleyball Championship may refer to

- Men's African Volleyball Championship
- Women's African Volleyball Championship
