= Chepngeno =

Chepngeno is a surname of Kenyan origin. Notable people with the surname include:

- Edna Chepngeno (born 1977), Kenyan volleyball player
- Hellen Chepngeno (born 1967), Kenyan cross country runner
- Jackline Chepngeno (born 1993), Kenyan long-distance runner
