= Makokha =

Makokha is a surname most common among members of the Luhya tribe who are from Western part of Kenya. The name Makokha literally means ashes and among the Luhya community, it was given to a child who was born to parents who had lost previous kids. Notable people with the surname include:

- Gaudencia Makokha (born 1992), Kenyan volleyball player
- Jacqueline Makokha (born 1974), Kenyan volleyball player
