= Barno =

Barno is a surname. Notable people with the surname include:

- Amaré Barno (born 1999), American football player
- David Barno (born 1954), American lieutenant general
- Elisha Barno (born 1985), Kenyan marathon runner
- Esther Barno (born 1968), Kenyan volleyball player
