= Abigael Tarus =

Kenyan volleyball player (born 1981)

Personal information
- Nationality: Kenyan
- Born: 26 August 1981 (age 45)
- Height: 1.76 m (5 ft 9 in)
- Weight: 67 kg (148 lb)
- Spike: 282 cm (111 in)
- Block: 261 cm (103 in)

Career
Teams
	Kenya Pipelines

National team
Kenya

Abigael Tarus is a Kenyan volleyball player.

She was part of the Kenya women's national volleyball team. She competed with the national team at the 2004 Summer Olympics in Athens, Greece. She played with the Kenya Pipeline club.

== Clubs ==
- Kenya Pipeline

== See also ==
- Kenya at the 2004 Summer Olympics
