= Susan Kahure =

Kenyan volleyball player (born 1969)

Personal information
- Nationality: Kenyan
- Born: 23 March 1969 (age 57)
- Height: 174 cm (5 ft 9 in)

Volleyball information
- Number: 18 (national team)

Career
Years	Teams
1994	Kenya Posta

National team
1994	Kenya

Susan Kahure (born 23 March 1969) is a retired Kenyan female volleyball player. She was part of the Kenya women's national volleyball team.

She was part of the team at the 1994 FIVB Volleyball Women's World Championship. On club level she played with Kenya Posta.

== Clubs ==
- Kenya Posta (1994)
