= Rhoda Vwosi =

Kenyan volleyball player (born 1965)

Personal information
- Nationality: Kenyan
- Born: 6 April 1965 (age 61)
- Height: 175 m (574 ft 2 in)

Volleyball information
- Number: 1 (national team)

Career
Years	Teams
1994	Kenya Pipeline

National team
1994	Kenya

Rhoda Vwosi (born 6 April 1965) is a retired Kenyan female volleyball player.

She was part of the Kenya women's national volleyball team. On club level she played with Kenya Pipeline.

== Clubs ==
- Kenya Pipeline (1994)
