= Leonidas Kamende =

Kenyan volleyball player (born 1979)

Personal information
- Nationality: Kenyan
- Born: 28 August 1979 (age 47)
- Height: 1.82 m (6 ft 0 in)
- Weight: 80 kg (180 lb)
- Spike: 291 cm (115 in)
- Block: 277 cm (109 in)

Volleyball information
- Number: 13

Career
Teams
	Kenya Pipelines

National team
2004	Kenya Kenya

Leonidas Kamende (born 28 August 1979) was a Kenyan female volleyball player.

She competed with the Kenya women's national volleyball team at the 2004 Summer Olympics in Athens, Greece. She participated in the 2002 FIVB Volleyball Women's World Championship. She played with Kenya Pipeline.

== Clubs ==
- Kenya Pipelines
