= Florence Bosire =

Kenyan volleyball player (born 1988)

Personal information
- Nationality: Kenyan
- Born: 26 September 1988 (age 38)
- Height: 1.75 m (5 ft 9 in)
- Weight: 57 kg (126 lb)
- Spike: 255 cm (100 in)
- Block: 250 cm (98 in)

Volleyball information
- Number: 6

Career
Years	Teams
2010	Kenya Prisons

National team
2010	Kenya

Florence Bosire (born 26 September 1988) is a retired Kenyan female volleyball player. She was part of the Kenya women's national volleyball team.

She participated in the 2010 FIVB Volleyball Women's World Championship, and in the 2011 FIVB Volleyball Women's Club World Championship. She played with Kenya Prisons.

== Clubs ==
- Kenya Prisons (2010)
