= Anne Khayumbi =

Kenyan volleyball player (born 1961)

Personal information
- Full name: Anne Khayumbi Wekhomba
- Nationality: Kenyan
- Born: 12 April 1961 (age 65)
- Height: 180 cm (5 ft 11 in)

Volleyball information
- Number: 17 (national team)

Career
Years	Teams
1994	Kenya Commercial Bank

National team
1994	Kenya

Anne Khayumbi Wekhomba (born 12 April 1961) is a retired Kenyan female volleyball player. She was part of the Kenya women's national volleyball team.

She participated in the 1994 FIVB Volleyball Women's World Championship. On club level she played with Kenya Commercial Bank.

== Clubs ==
- Kenya Commercial Bank (1994)
