= Triza Atuka =

Kenyan volleyball player (born 1992)

Personal information
- Nationality: Kenya
- Born: 14 April 1992 (age 34) Kakamega, Kenya
- Height: 1.88 m (6 ft 2 in)
- Weight: 65 kg (143 lb)
- Spike: 298 cm (117 in)
- Block: 293 cm (115 in)

Volleyball information
- Position: Middle blocker
- Current club: Kenya Pipeline
- Number: 8

Career
- Years: Team
- 2011–2012 2013–present: Kenya Commercial Bank; Kenya Pipeline

National team
- Years: Team
- 2014-present: Kenya

Triza Atuka (born 14 April 1992) is a Kenyan volleyball player. She is part of the Kenya women's national volleyball team. At club level she plays for the Kenya Pipeline Company team. In 2016, the Kenya Volleyball Federation awarded her their female Most Valuable Player award.

== Career ==
In 2017 she was captain of the Pipeline team in Cairo as they contested the Women's Africa Club Volleyball Championship.

When Kenya's team for the postponed 2020 Summer Olympics in Tokyo was announced in 2021, Atuka, together with other experienced players Violet Makuto and Elizabeth Wanyama, were not among the dozen players chosen to travel to Japan.

She competed at the 2023 FIVB Women's Volleyball Challenger Cup, and 2023 Women's African Nations Volleyball Championship.

In 2024, she was named to the Kenya women's national volleyball team at the 2024 Summer Olympics, and selected to be flag bearer and the team's captain. The team was in pool B and they played three matches in Paris against Brazil, Poland and Japan. They lost all three matches with a repeated score of 3–0.

Olympic Games
Preceded by Andrew Amonde; Mercy Moim	Flagbearer for Kenya; Paris 2024 with Ferdinand Omanyala	Succeeded by Incumbent
