= Noel Murambi =

Kenyan volleyball player (born 1987)

Personal information
- Nationality: Kenya
- Born: 29 January 1989 (age 37) Nyeri, Kenya
- Height: 1.74 m (5 ft 9 in)
- Weight: 68 kg (150 lb)
- Spike: 302 cm (119 in)
- Block: 297 cm (117 in)

Volleyball information
- Number: 1

Career
- Years: Team
- –: Kenya Pipeline

National team
- Years: Team
- –: Kenya

Noel Murambi (born 29 January 1989) is a Kenyan volleyball player. She is part of the Kenya women's national volleyball team. She participated at the 2015 FIVB Volleyball Women's World Cup and at the 2016 FIVB Volleyball World Grand Prix.

In 2017 she was in the Kenya Pipeline team in Cairo as they contested the Women's Africa Club Volleyball Championship.

She was chosen to represent Kenya at the 2020 Summer Olympics.

== Clubs ==
- Kenya Pipeline
