= Emily Wesutila =

Kenyan volleyball player (born 1973)

Personal information
- Nationality: Kenyan
- Born: 8 March 1973 (age 53)
- Height: 1.53 m (5 ft 0 in)
- Weight: 60 kg (132 lb)

National team
2000	Kenya

Emily Wesutila (born 8 March 1973) was a Kenyan female volleyball player. She was part of the Kenya women's national volleyball team.

She competed with the national team at the 2000 Summer Olympics in Sydney, Australia, finishing 11th.

== See also ==
- Kenya at the 2000 Summer Olympics
