= Nancy Waswa =

Kenyan volleyball player (born 1971)

Personal information
- Full name: Nancy Lusanji-Waswa
- Nationality: Kenyan
- Born: 28 December 1971 (age 54)
- Height: 1.74 m (5 ft 9 in)
- Weight: 60 kg (132 lb)

National team
2000	Kenya

Nancy Lusanji-Waswa (born 28 December 1971) is a retired Kenyan female volleyball player. She was part of the Kenya women's national volleyball team.

She competed with the national team at the 2000 Summer Olympics in Sydney, Australia, finishing 11th. She participated in the 2002 FIVB Volleyball Women's World Championship.

== See also ==
- Kenya at the 2000 Summer Olympics
