= Judith Serenge =

Kenyan volleyball player (born 1976)

Personal information
- Nationality: Kenyan
- Born: 21 January 1976 (age 50)
- Height: 1.53 m (5 ft 0 in)
- Weight: 60 kg (130 lb)
- Spike: 256 cm (101 in)
- Block: 245 cm (96 in)

Volleyball information
- Number: 18

Career
| Years | Teams |
|---|---|
| 2004 | Kenya Pipelines |

National team
| 2004 | Kenya Kenya |

Judith Serenge (born 21 January 1976) was a Kenyan female volleyball player. She was part of the Kenya women's national volleyball team.

She competed with the national team at the 2000 Summer Olympics, and 2004 Summer Olympics in Athens, Greece. She played with Kenya Pipelines in 2004.

== Clubs ==
- Kenya Pipelines (2004)
