= Lucy Chege =

Kenyan volleyball player (born 1976)

Lucy Chege (born November 15, 1976) is a volleyball player from Kenya. She has captained the Kenya women's national volleyball team. She has played in the FIVB Volleyball Women's World Championship. In Kenya, she represents the Kenya Pipeline volleyball club.
