= Phyllis Anyango =

Kenyan volleyball player (born 1971)

Personal information
- Nationality: Kenyan
- Born: 18 February 1971 (age 55)
- Height: 1.82 m (6 ft 0 in)

Volleyball information
- Number: 16 (national team)

Career
Years	Teams
1994	Kenya Railways

National team
1994	Kenya

Phyllis Anyango (born 18 February 1971) is a retired Kenyan female volleyball player. She was part of the Kenya women's national volleyball team.

== Life ==
She was born in Kenya and she did not take to volleyball until she about nineteen. She had played basketball but she disliked the amount of running.

She participated in the 1994 FIVB Volleyball Women's World Championship and she went with Kenya to the Olympics in Sydney. On a club level she played with Kenya Railways.

After a decade of playing in Kenya and when she was 29 she moved to America to take up a volleyball scholarship and to study computer science and maths.

In 2019 she was honoured for the service she had given in Tennessee's secondary schools.

== Clubs ==
- Kenya Railways (1994)
