= 1991 Women's African Volleyball Championship =

The 1991 Women's African Volleyball Championship was the Fifth Edition African continental volleyball Championship for women in Africa and it was held in Cairo, Egypt, with Eight teams participated.

== Teams ==
- Egypt
- Ethiopia
- Cameroon
- Ghana
- Kenya
- Madagascar
- Tunisia
- Zaire

== Final ranking ==
Rank	Team
1st place, gold medalist(s)	Kenya
2nd place, silver medalist(s)	Egypt
3rd place, bronze medalist(s)	Cameroon
4	Ghana
5	Tunisia
6	Zaire
7	Madagascar
8	Ethiopia

1991 Women's African champions

Kenya
First title
