= Maria Kochwa =

Kenyan volleyball player (1966–2014)

Mary Kochwa

Personal information
- Full name: Mary Ayuma-Kochwa
- Nationality: Kenyan
- Born: 23 October 1966
- Died: 2014 (aged 47–48)
- Height: 1.68 m (5 ft 6 in)
- Weight: 71 kg (157 lb)

Volleyball information
- Number: 10 (national team)

Career
Years	Teams
1994	Kenya Posta

National team
1994-2000	Kenya

Mary Ayuma-Kochwa (23 October 1966 – 2014) was a Kenyan volleyball player. She was part of the Kenya women's national volleyball team.

She participated at the 1998 FIVB Volleyball Women's World Championship in Japan, and at the 2003 All Africa Women's Volleyball Championship. She competed with the national team at the 2000 Summer Olympics in Sydney, Australia, finishing 11th.

== See also ==
- Kenya at the 2000 Summer Olympics
