= Rodah Lyali =

Kenyan volleyball player (born 1976)

Personal information
- Nationality: Kenyan
- Born: 22 November 1976 (age 49)
- Height: 169 cm (5 ft 7 in)
- Weight: 72 kg (159 lb)
- Spike: 275 cm (108 in)
- Block: 250 cm (98 in)

Volleyball information
- Number: 20

Career
Years	Teams
2010	Kenya Pipeline Company

National team
2010	Kenya

Rodah Lyali (born 22 November 1976) is a retired Kenyan female volleyball player. She was part of the Kenya women's national volleyball team.

She participated at the 2002 FIVB Volleyball Women's World Championship, and at the 2010 FIVB Volleyball Women's World Championship in Japan. She played with Kenya Pipeline Company.

== Clubs ==
- Kenya Pipeline Company (2010)
