= Andrew Amonde =

Kenyan rugby union player and television producer

- Full name: Andrew Noel Omondi Amonde
- Born: 25 December 1983 (age 42) Nyeri, Kenya
- Height: 1.89 m (6 ft 2 in)
- Weight: 106 kg (234 lb)

Rugby union career
- Position: Flanker
International career
Years	Team	Apps	(Points)
2014	Kenya	1	(5)
National sevens team
Years	Team		Comps
2012–	Kenya 7s		311 matches

Andrew Noel Omondi Amonde (born 25 December 1983) is a Kenyan rugby union player and television producer. He plays for Kenya's national sevens team and has been its captain since 2012. Amonde captained Kenya's Olympic sevens team at the 2016 Summer Olympics.

Volleyballer Mercy Moim and Amonde were chosen to be Kenya's flagbearers at the Olympics opening ceremony in Tokyo (Moim was the second woman to be given this honour following archer Shehzana Anwar in 2016).

Olympic Games
Preceded by Shehzana Anwar	Flagbearer for Kenya; Tokyo 2020 with Mercy Moim	Succeeded by Triza Atuka; Ferdinand Omanyala
