= Pamela Jepkirui =

Kenyan volleyball player (born 1996)

Personal information
- Nationality: Kenya
- Born: 8 February 1995 (age 31); Nyeri, Kenya
- Height: 1.78 m (5 ft 10 in)
- Weight: 70 kg (154 lb)
- Spike: 300 cm (118 in)
- Block: 290 cm (114 in)

Volleyball information
- Current club: (Seychelles) Anse Royale

Career
Teams
	Kenya Prisons

National team
Kenya

Pamela Jepkirui (born 8 February 1996 Nandi) is a Kenyan volleyball player. She is part of the Kenya women's national volleyball team as an outside hitter. She participated at the 2018 FIVB Volleyball Women's World Championship. She was selected for the 2020 Summer Olympics. The Kenya national team set off for the Olympics in Tokyo in three batches to try and minimise the chances of being affected by the COVID-19 pandemic. Their opening match will be on 25 July in Tokyo against Japan.

She currently plays with Kenya Prisons.

== Clubs ==
- Kenya Prisons
