= 1989 Women's African Volleyball Championship =

The 1989 Women's African Volleyball Championship was the Fourth Edition African continental volleyball Championship for women in Africa and it was held in Port Louis, Mauritius, with Fourth teams participated.

== Teams ==
- Egypt
- Kenya
- Madagascar
- Mauritius

== Final ranking ==
Rank	Team
1st place, gold medalist(s)	Egypt
2nd place, silver medalist(s)	Mauritius
3rd place, bronze medalist(s)	Madagascar
4	Kenya

1989 Women's African champions

Egypt
Second title
