= Nancy Nyongesa =

Kenyan volleyball player (born 1987)

Personal information
- Nationality: Kenyan
- Born: 18 June 1987 (age 39)
- Height: 1.70 m (5 ft 7 in)
- Weight: 63 kg (139 lb)
- Spike: 280 cm (110 in)
- Block: 260 cm (100 in)

Volleyball information
- Number: 5

Career
Years	Teams
2004	(Kenya) Lugulu

National team
2004	Kenya Kenya

Nancy Nyongesa (born 18 June 1987) is a Kenyan former female volleyball player. She was part of the Kenya women's national volleyball team.

She competed with the national team at the 2004 Summer Olympics in Athens, Greece. She played with Lugulu in 2004.

== Clubs ==
- (Kenya) Lugulu (2004)
