= Margaret Mukoya =

Kenyan volleyball player (born 1973)

Personal information
- Nationality: Kenyan
- Born: 28 August 1973 (age 53)
- Height: 1.53 m (5 ft 0 in)

Volleyball information
- Position: middle blocker
- Current club: Telkom Kenya
- Number: 2 (national team)

National team
2002	Kenya

Margaret Mukoya (born 28 August 1973) is a retired Kenyan female volleyball player, who played as a middle blocker.

She was part of the Kenya women's national volleyball team at the 2002 FIVB Volleyball Women's World Championship in Germany. On club level she played with Telkom Kenya.

== Clubs ==
- Telkom Kenya (2002)
