= Bulwani =

- Location within Kenya
- Coordinates: 0.01°N 34.01°E
- Country: Kenya
- County: Busia County
- Time zone: UTC+3 (EAT)

Bulwani is a settlement in Kenya's Busia County. Like other rural market centres, Bulwani serves as a market centre for the lower-class people around the areas of Enakaywa, Bulwani, Madola, Bwaliro, and Kanjala. It is also a sub-location that falls under Elugulu Ward in Butula Constituency, Busia County.

It is located on the road just 3.5 km from Butula sub-county headquarters and 4.0 km from Lugulu market. The majority of people living there speak the Luhya language and are of the Abaluyia tribe.

According to the 2019 Kenyan census, the township centered in Bulwani had 3,468 residents and 783 houses.
