= 1997 Women's African Volleyball Championship =

African Women's Volleyball competition

The 1997 Women's African Volleyball Championship was the eighth edition of the African continental volleyball championship for women in Africa and it was held in Nairobi, Kenya with Five teams participated.

== Teams ==
- Angola
- Kenya
- Nigeria
- Mozambique
- South Africa

== Final ranking ==
Rank	Team
1st place, gold medalist(s)	Kenya
2nd place, silver medalist(s)	Nigeria
3rd place, bronze medalist(s)	Angola
4	South Africa
5	Mozambique

1997 Women's African champions

Kenya
Fourth title
