= Ethiopia women's national volleyball team =

National sports team

Ethiopia
- Association: Ethiopia Volleyball Federation
- Confederation: CAVB
- FIVB ranking: NR (24 May 2026)

Uniforms
Home

The Ethiopia women's national volleyball team represents Ethiopia in international women's volleyball competitions and friendly matches.

The team qualified for the 1991 and 1993 events of the Women's African Volleyball Championship.
