= Marjorie Vilchez =

Peruvian volleyball player (born 1978)

Marjorie Vilchez Soto

Personal information
- Nationality: Peruvian
- Born: 15 January 1978 (age 48)
- Height: 185 cm (6 ft 1 in)

Career
Years	Teams
1994	Latino Amisa

National team
1994-1996	Peru

Marjorie Vilchez Soto (born 15 January 1978) was a Peruvian female volleyball player.

Vilchez was part of the Peru women's national volleyball team at the 1996 Summer Olympics, and the 1994 FIVB Volleyball Women's World Championship. On club level she played with Latino Amisa.

== Clubs ==
- Latino Amisa (1994)
