= Catherine Mabwi =

Kenyan volleyball player (born 1966)

Personal information
- Nationality: Kenyan
- Born: 1 August 1966 (age 60)
- Height: 173 cm (5 ft 8 in)
- Spike: 289 cm (114 in)
- Block: 272 cm (107 in)

Volleyball information
- Current club: Mpesa Foundation Academy
- Number: 5 (national team)

National team
1998	Kenya

Catherine Mabwi (born 1 August 1966) is a Kenyan female volleyball player, and coach. She was the coach at Mpesa Foundation Academy.

She was part of the Kenya women's national volleyball team at the 1998 FIVB Volleyball Women's World Championship in Japan.

In 2020 she became the first African woman to have the Federation of International Volleyball (FIVB) rank of instructor.

In 2024 she joined the FIVB Coaches Commission as the African representative. There are twelve members of the commission, including the American coach Karch Kiraly, which is led by Giovanni Guidetti who is the coach for the Serbian women's team.
