= Esther Ouna =

Kenyan volleyball player (born 1968)

Personal information
- Nationality: Kenyan
- Born: 10 January 1968 (age 58)
- Height: 160 m (524 ft 11 in)

Volleyball information
- Number: 7 (national team)

Career
Years	Teams
1994	Kenya Posta

National team
1994	Kenya

Esther Ouna (born 10 January 1968) is a retired Kenyan female volleyball player. She was part of the Kenya women's national volleyball team.

She participated in the 1994 FIVB Volleyball Women's World Championship. On club level she played with Kenya Posta.

== Clubs ==
- Kenya Posta (1994)
