= Philister Jebet =

Kenyan volleyball player (born 1984)

Philister Jebet-Sang

Personal information
- Nationality: Kenyan
- Born: 12 September 1984 (age 42)
- Height: 1.85 m (6 ft 1 in)

Volleyball information
- Position: wing spiker
- Current club: Kenya Pipeline
- Number: 1 (national team)

National team
2002	Kenya

Philister Jebet-Sang (born 12 September 1984) is a retired Kenyan female volleyball player, who played as a wing spiker.

She was part of the Kenya women's national volleyball team. She competed at the 2002 FIVB Volleyball Women's World Championship in Germany. On club level she played with Kenya Pipeline. She also competed with the national team at the 2004 Summer Olympics in Athens, Greece. She played with Indian Hills Community College in 2004.

== Clubs ==
- Kenya Pipeline (2002)
- (United States) Indian Hills Community College (2004)
