= Gladys Nasikanda =

Kenyan volleyball player (born 1978)

Personal information
- Nationality: Kenyan
- Born: 25 July 1978 (age 48)
- Height: 1.80 m (5 ft 11 in)
- Weight: 75 kg (165 lb)
- Spike: 290 cm (110 in)
- Block: 300 cm (120 in)

Volleyball information
- Number: 15

Career
Years	Teams
2004	(United States) Union University

National team
2004	Kenya Kenya

Gladys Nasikanda (born 25 July 1978) is a Kenyan volleyball player. She was part of the Kenya women's national volleyball team.

She competed with the Kenyan national team at the 2000 and 2004 Olympics. She played with Union University in 2004.

== Clubs ==
- (United States) Union University (2004)
