= Helen Elele =

Kenyan volleyball player (born 1973)

Personal information
- Nationality: Kenyan
- Born: 9 September 1973 (age 53)
- Height: 179 cm (5 ft 10 in)
- Spike: 290 cm (114 in)
- Block: 275 cm (108 in)

Volleyball information
- Number: 8 (national team)

National team
1994-1998	Kenya

Helen Elele (born 9 September 1973) is a retired Kenyan female volleyball player. She was part of the Kenya women's national volleyball team.

She participated at the 1994 FIVB Volleyball Women's World Championship, and at the 1998 FIVB Volleyball Women's World Championship in Japan.
