= 1976 Women's African Volleyball Championship =

The 1976 Women's African Volleyball Championship was the First African continental volleyball Championship for women in Africa and it was held in Port Said, Egypt, with Six teams has participated.

== Teams ==
- Algeria
- Egypt
- Morocco
- Guinea
- Sudan
- Tunisia

== Final ranking ==
| Rank | Team |
|---|---|
| 1st place, gold medalist(s) | Egypt |
| 2nd place, silver medalist(s) | Tunisia |
| 3rd place, bronze medalist(s) | Morocco |
| 4 | Algeria |
| 5 | Sudan |
| 6 | Guinea |

1976 Women's African champions

Egypt
First title
