= Dorcas Nakhomicha Ndasaba =

Kenyan volleyball player (born 1971)

Dorcas Ndasaba

Personal information
- Full name: Dorcas Nakhumicha Ndasaba
- Nationality: Kenyan
- Born: 31 March 1971 (age 55)
- Height: 1.74 m (5 ft 9 in)
- Weight: 72 kg (159 lb)

National team
2000	Kenya

Dorcas Nakhumicha Ndasaba (born 31 March 1971) is a former Kenyan volleyball player. She was part of the Kenya women's national volleyball team.

== Life ==
She participated in the 1998 FIVB Volleyball Women's World Championship, and in the 2002 FIVB Volleyball Women's World Championship. She competed with the national team at the 2000 Summer Olympics in Sydney, and at the 2004 Summer Olympics, both times finishing 11th.

In 2007 under there then Kenyan national coach Sammy Kirongo led them to a seventh victory at the Women's African Volleyball Championship in Nairobi and the final was against Algeria. The Kenyan team included Brackcides Agala, Janet Wanja, Edinah Rotich, Dorcas Ndasaba and Catherine Wanjiru. Ndasaba was judged best player after she gained the final point to deliver victory in straight sets.
