= Nancy Sikobe =

Kenyan volleyball player (born 1970)

Personal information
- Nationality: Kenyan
- Born: 15 August 1970 (age 56)
- Height: 180 m (590 ft 7 in)

Volleyball information
- Number: 2 (national team)

Career
| Years | Teams |
|---|---|
| 1994 | Kenya Posta |

National team
| 1994 | Kenya |

Nancy Sikobe (born 15 August 1970) is a retired Kenyan female volleyball player. She was part of the Kenya women's national volleyball team.

She participated in the 1994 FIVB Volleyball Women's World Championship. On club level she played with Kenya Posta.

== Clubs ==
- Kenya Posta (1994)
