= Salome Wanjala =

Kenyan volleyball player (born 1985)

Personal information
- Nationality: Kenyan
- Born: 20 April 1985 (age 41)
- Height: 1.69 m (5 ft 7 in)

Volleyball information
- Position: wing spiker
- Current club: Kenya Commercial Bank
- Number: 10 (national team)

National team
2002	Kenya

Salome Wanjala (born 20 April 1985) is a retired Kenyan female volleyball player, who played as a wing spiker.

She was part of the Kenya women's national volleyball team at the 2002 FIVB Volleyball Women's World Championship in Germany. On club level she played with Kenya Commercial Bank.

== Clubs ==
- Kenya Commercial Bank (2002)
