= Roselidah Obunaga =

Kenyan volleyball player (born 1973)

Personal information
- Nationality: Kenyan
- Born: 23 December 1973 (age 52); Kakamega, Kenya
- Height: 1.80 m (5 ft 11 in)
- Weight: 72 kg (159 lb)
- Spike: 284 cm (112 in)
- Block: 272 cm (107 in)

Volleyball information
- Number: 11

Career
Years	Teams
2004	(United States) Missouri State University

National team
2000-2004	Kenya Kenya

Roselidah Obunaga-Mangala (born 23 December 1973) is a Kenyan female volleyball player. She was part of the Kenya women's national volleyball team.

She competed with the national team at the 2000 Summer Olympics in Sydney, Australia and at the 2004 Summer Olympics in Athens, Greece. She played with Missouri State University in 2002 and 2003, and Columbia College.

She coaches at Savannah State University.

== Clubs ==
- (United States) Missouri State University, 2002–2003.
