= Dorcas Murunga =

Kenyan volleyball player (born 1969)

Personal information
- Nationality: Kenyan
- Born: 12 May 1969 (age 57)
- Height: 170 m (557 ft 9 in)

Volleyball information
- Number: 13 (national team)

Career
Years	Teams
1994	Kenya Commercial Bank

National team
1994	Kenya

Dorcas Murunga (born 12 May 1969) is a retired Kenyan female volleyball player. She was part of the Kenya women's national volleyball team.

She participated in the 1994 FIVB Volleyball Women's World Championship. On club level she played with Kenya Commercial Bank.

== Clubs ==
- Kenya Commercial Bank (1994)
