= Mercy Wesutila =

Kenyan volleyball player (born 1976)

Personal information
- Nationality: Kenyan
- Born: 8 March 1976 (age 50)
- Height: 1.53 m (5 ft 0 in)
- Weight: 75 kg (165 lb)
- Spike: 290 cm (110 in)
- Block: 300 cm (120 in)

Volleyball information
- Number: 17

Career
Years	Teams
2004	Kenya Pipelines

National team
2004	Kenya Kenya

Mercy Wesutila (born 8 March 1976) is a Kenyan female volleyball player. She was part of the Kenya women's national volleyball team.

== Life ==
She competed with the national team at the 2004 Summer Olympics. She participated in the 2002 FIVB Volleyball Women's World Championship. She played with Kenya Pipelines in 2004.

== Clubs ==
- Kenya Pipelines (2004)
