= Nancy Lijodi =

Kenyan volleyball player (born 1971)

Personal information
- Nationality: Kenyan
- Born: 20 September 1971 (age 55); Butere, Kenya
- Hometown: Butere
- Height: 172 m (564 ft 4 in)

Volleyball information
- Number: 14 (national team)

Career
Years	Teams
1994	Kenya Commercial Bank

National team
1994	Kenya

Nancy Lijodi (born 20 September 1971) is a retired Kenyan female volleyball player. She was part of the Kenya women's national volleyball team.

She participated in the 1994 FIVB Volleyball Women's World Championship. On club level she played with Kenya Commercial Bank.

== Clubs ==
- Kenya Commercial Bank (1994)
