= Edna Chepngeno =

Kenyan volleyball player (born 1977)

Personal information
- Full name: Edna Chumo Chepngeno
- Nationality: Kenyan
- Born: 15 July 1977 (age 49)
- Height: 1.78 m (5 ft 10 in)
- Weight: 72 kg (159 lb)

National team
| 2000 | Kenya |

Edna Chumo Chepngeno (born 15 July 1977) was a former Kenyan volleyball player. She was part of the Kenya women's national volleyball team. She participated in the 1998 FIVB Volleyball Women's World Championship. She also competed with the national team at the 2000 Summer Olympics in Sydney, Australia, finishing 11th.

== See also ==
- Kenya at the 2000 Summer Olympics
