= Kenya women's national volleyball team =

National sports team

Kenya
- Nickname(s): Malkia Strikers
- Association: Kenya Volleyball Federation
- Confederation: CAVB
- Head coach: Japheth Munala
- FIVB ranking: 21 (24 May 2026)

Uniforms
Home	Away

Summer Olympics
- Appearances: 4 (First in 2000)
- Best result: 11th place (2000, 2004)

World Championship
- Appearances: 8 (First in 1994)
- Best result: 13th place (1994, 1998)
Honours
All-Africa Games
Gold medal – first place	1991 Cairo	Team competition
Gold medal – first place	1995 Harare	Team competition
Gold medal – first place	1999 Johannesburg	Team competition
Gold medal – first place	2015 Brazzaville	Team competition
Gold medal – first place	2019 Rabat	Team competition
Silver medal – second place	1987 Nairobi	Team competition
Bronze medal – third place	2003 Abuja	Team competition
Bronze medal – third place	2007 Algiers	Team competition
Bronze medal – third place	2011 Maputo	Team competition
African Championship
Gold medal – first place	1991 Cairo	Team competition
Gold medal – first place	1993 Lagos	Team competition
Gold medal – first place	1995 Nairobi	Team competition
Gold medal – first place	1997 Cairo	Team competition
Gold medal – first place	2005 Lagos	Team competition
Gold medal – first place	2007 Nairobi	Team competition
Gold medal – first place	2011 Nairobi	Team competition
Gold medal – first place	2013 Nairobi	Team competition
Gold medal – first place	2015 Nairobi	Team competition
Gold medal – first place	2023 Yaoundé	Team competition
Silver medal – second place	2003 Nairobi	Team competition
Silver medal – second place	2017 Yaoundé	Team competition
Silver medal – second place	2019 Cairo	Team competition
Silver medal – second place	2021 Kigali	Team competition
Silver medal – second place	2026 Nairobi	Team competition

The Kenya women's national volleyball team, the Malkia Strikers, represents Kenya in international volleyball competitions. Kenya has dominated the African continent since the 1990s, winning the Women's African Volleyball Championship a record of ten times. They have qualified four times for the Olympics; in 2000, 2004, 2020 and 2024.

Kenya also has a beach volleyball team, who were the only women's team at the Tokyo Olympics. Kenya's women's sitting volleyball team did not qualify for Tokyo.

== History ==
Women were not invited to play volleyball at the All-Africa Games until 1978. Those games were in Algiers, Algeria and Kenya did not send a team. The team was there in 1991 for the Volleyball at the 1991 All-Africa Games where they were first. They were also in Cairo when eight teams were present for the 1991 Women's African Volleyball Championship and Kenya again took the gold medal.

Violet Barasa, as national team captain, lead the national team to its appearances at the 2000 Summer Olympics and the 2004 Summer Olympics. At both events they finished eleventh.

In 2006 the team's coach was the Japanese coach Sadatoshi Sugawara who was assisted by Paul Bitok. They contested the FIVB World Championships in Japan although the team was said to lack professional players as the chosen team were students or players who were based in Japan.

In 2007 their coach Sammy Kirongo led them to a seventh Women's African Volleyball Championship victory. That year's championships was in Nairobi and the final was against Algeria. The Kenyan team included Brackcides Agala, Janet Wanja, Dorcas Ndasaba and Catherine Wanjiru. Mildred Odwako was said to be the "best digger" and Janet Wanja was the "best setter". Dorcas Ndasaba was judged "best player" after she gained the final point to deliver victory in straight sets.

In 2008 they failed to qualify for the 2008 Summer Olympics after they were beaten by Algeria and four years later Algeria again denied them qualification for the 2012 Summer Olympics in London.

In 2015 Brackcides Agala was the captain of the team and Janet Wanja assisted her. The team announced that they refused to play for the 2015 FIVB World Grand Prix in Canberra after several victories. The players were annoyed that they had not been paid money that had been promised by the Kenya Volleyball Federation. The boycott was successful and the team played and won against Peru. However, the KVF were not pleased and when the team's were announced for the 2016 Summer Olympics neither Khadambi or her assistant Janet Wanja were asked to the qualifying matches and the team failed to qualify.

In 2020, under the new head coach of Paul Bitok, Kenya's women's volleyball team won the gold medal at the African Games and they qualified for the postponed 2020 Summer Olympics which was the first time in sixteen years.

=== 2020 Olympics ===
Kenya women's volleyball team qualified for the postponed 2020 Summer Olympics by winning the pool round with three match points and securing an outright berth at the African Olympic Qualification Tournament in Yaoundé, Cameroon, marking the nation's return to the Olympics for the first time since Athens 2004.

The chosen players names were revealed on 26 June 2021. The Olympic team included the veteran Mercy Moim as captain and Jane Wacu also made the team, but former players Violet Makuto and Elizabeth Wanyama were not included. Kenya's "Most Valued Player" Brackcides Agala was included in the beach volleyball team. The team received additional coaching from six Brazilian coaches who visited Kenya and the team was then sent to Nairobi where they received additional coaching from the Brazilian coach Luizomar de Moura. The other teams in their group in Tokyo are the home team Japan, Serbia, Brazil, Korea and the Dominican Republic.

The team set off from Kenya for the Olympics in Tokyo in three batches to try and minimise the chances of being affected by the COVID-19 pandemic. The team's captain Mercy Moim was chosen to be one of Kenya's flagbearers at the Olympics opening ceremony (Moim was the second woman to be given this honour following archer Shazad Anwar in 2016).

Their opening match was on 25 July in Tokyo against Japan. Surprisingly Paul Bitok was not on the match's touchline, but Brazilian coach Luizomar de Moura was announced as the head coach. He spoke to the press via the team manager. The team lost their first match against Japan in straight sets.

== Results ==
=== Olympic Games ===
- 1964 to 1996 — did not participate
- 2000 — 11th place (tied)
- 2004 — 11th place (tied)
- 2008 — did not qualify
- 2012 — did not qualify
- 2016 — did not qualify
- 2020 — 12th place
- 2024 — 12th place

=== World Championship ===
- 1994 — 13th place
- 1998 — 13th place
- 2002 — 21st place
- 2006 — 21st place
- 2010 — 21st place
- 2014 — did not qualify
- 2018 — 20th place
- 2022 — 19th place
- 2025 — 20th place
- 2027 — Qualified

=== World Cup ===
- 1991 —12th place
- 1995 — 11th place
- 2007 — 12th place
- 2011 — 12th place
- 2015 — 10th place
- 2019 — 11th place

=== FIVB World Grand Prix ===
- 2014 — 25th place
- 2015 — 21st place
- 2016 — 20th place

=== FIVB Challenger Cup ===
- 2023 — 6th place
- 2024 — 5th place

=== Women's African Volleyball Championship ===
- 1991 — (gold)
- 1993 — (gold)
- 1995 — (gold)
- 1997 — (gold)
- 2003 — (silver)
- 2005 — (gold)
- 2007 — (gold)
- 2011 — (gold)
- 2013 — (gold)
- 2015 — (gold)
- 2017 — (silver)
- 2019 — (silver)
- 2021 — (silver)
- 2023 — (gold)
- 2026 — (silver)

== 2021 Beach volleyball Olympic team ==
Kenya also has a women's national beach volleyball team. The team that gained Kenya qualification for the postponed 2020 Summer Olympics was Yvonne Wavinya, Brackcides Agala, Phosca Kasisi and Gaudencia Makokha. They qualified when they won at the African Continental Cup Finals in Morocco in 2021. They gained victory in a final against the Nigeria women's national volleyball team. Wavinga and Kasisi beat Tochukwu Nnoruga and Albertina Francis 2-0 while Agala and Makokha beat the other Nigerian pair of Francisca Ikhiede and Amara Uchechukwu 2–1.

Kenya's beach volleyballers were in the four Continental Cup winners with Argentina, Cuba and China. Kenya has never had a beach volleyball team at the Olympics and they are only the fourth African country to send a team. The four players who qualified will make up Kenya's Olympic beach volleyball team chosen by the coach Sammy Mulinge. They will compete initially with the teams from Brazil, the US and Latvia in pool D at the postponed 2020 Summer Olympics in Tokyo. The volleyballers stayed in Mombasa for training before flying to Tokyo. They were the African champions, but the pandemic meant that many of their future opponents had been able to play more matches.

== 2021 Sitting Volleyball Paralympic team ==
Kenya's sitting volleyball team failed to qualify in the round robin contests in Kigali in September 2019. Rwanda won the place putting Egypt into second place in the final.

== Current squad ==
Roster for the 2024 Summer Olympics. The roster was announced on 9 July 2024.

Head coach: Japheth Munala

- 1 Esther Mutinda S
- 2 Veronica Oluoch OH
- 3 Pamella Owino OP
- 4 Leonida Kasaya OH
- 6 Belinda Barasa MB
- 7 Emmaculate Misoki S
- 8 Trizah Atuka (c) MB
- 11 Loise Simiyu OP
- 13 Juliana Namutira OH
- 15 Lorine Kaei MB
- 16 Agripina Kundu L
- 19 Edith Mukuvilani MB

=== Previous squads ===
- 1991 World Cup squad
  - Melisa Angel
  - Nancy Lijodi
  - Anne Wekhomba
  - Lena Serem
  - Pamela Mukima
  - Jane Njeri-Onyango
  - Nancy Sikobe
  - Lucy Kamweru
  - Beatrice Kwoba
  - Dorcas Murunga
  - Catherine Mabwi
  - Mary Ayuma
- 1994 World Championship squad
  - Rhoda Vwosi
  - Nancy Sikobe
  - Helen Elele
  - Esther Chepkosgei
  - Esther Barno
  - Esther Ouna
  - Doris Wefwafwa
  - Mary Ayuma
  - Jacqueline Makokha
  - Nancy Lijodi
  - Phyllis Anyango
  - Anne Wekhomba
- 1998 World Championship squad
  - Margaret Indakala
  - Catherine Mabwi
  - Edna Chepngeno
  - Doris Wefwafwa
  - Helen Elele
  - Dorcas Ndasaba
  - Roselidah Obunaga
  - Jacqueline Makokha
  - Esther Barno
  - Mary Ayuma
  - Nancy Lusanji
  - Judith Serenge
- 2000 Summer Olympic squad
  - Dorcas Ndasaba
  - Doris Wefwafwa
  - Edna Chepngeno
  - Emily Wesutila
  - Gladys Nasikanda
  - Jacqueline Makokha
  - Judith Serenge
  - Margaret Indakala
  - Mary Ayuma
  - Nancy Lusanji
  - Roselidah Obunaga
  - Violet Barasa
- 2002 World Championship squad
  - Philister Sang
  - Margaret Mukoya
  - Rodah Lyali
  - Abigael Tarus
  - Catherine Wanjiru
  - Lucy Chege
  - Dorcas Ndasaba
  - Salome Wanjala
  - Leonidas Kamende
  - Violet Barasa
  - Nancy Lusanji
  - Mercy Wesutila
- 2004 Summer Olympic squad
  - Philister Sang
  - Abigael Tarus
  - Nancy Nyongesa
  - Catherine Wanjiru
  - Janet Wanja
  - Dorcas Ndasaba
  - Roselidah Obunaga
  - Leonidas Kamende
  - Violet Barasa
  - Gladys Nasikanda
  - Mercy Wesutila
  - Judith Serenge
- 2006 World Championship squad
  - Jane Wacu
  - Doris Palanga
  - Lucy Chege
  - Catherine Wanjiru
  - Janet Wanja
  - Mildred Odwako
  - Dorcas Ndasaba
  - Jackline Barasa
  - Lydia Maiyo
  - Leonidas Kamende
  - Brackcides Khadambi
  - Judith Tarus
- 2007 World Cup squad
  - Jane Wacu
  - Diana Khisa
  - Doris Palanga
  - Catherine Wanjiru
  - Janet Wanja
  - Dorcas Ndasaba
  - Jackline Barasa
  - Lydia Maiyo
  - Mercy Moim
  - Brackcides Khadambi
  - Judith Tarus
  - Edinah Rotich
- 2011 World Cup squad
  - Everlyne Makuto
  - Esther Wangeci
  - Diana Khisa
  - Ruth Jepngetich
  - Janet Wanja
  - Roseline Odhiambo
  - Noel Murambi
  - Lydia Maiyo
  - Mercy Moim
  - Brackcides Khadambi
  - Judith Tarus
  - Florence Bosire
- 2015 World Cup squad
  - Jane Wacu
  - Everlyne Makuto
  - Esther Wangeci
  - Janet Wanja
  - Triza Atuka
  - Elizabeth Wanyama
  - Noel Murambi
  - Lydia Maiyo
  - Mercy Moim
  - Brackcides Khadambi
  - Ruth Jepngetich
  - Monica Biama
- 2018 World Championship squad
  - Jane Wacu
  - Christine Psiwa
  - Violet Makuto
  - Leonida Kasaya
  - Sharon Chepchumba
  - Janet Wanja
  - Triza Atuka
  - Elizabeth Wanyama
  - Noel Murambi
  - Mercy Moim (capt)
  - Lorine Chebet
  - Agripina Kundu
  - Emmaculate Chemtai
  - Edith Mukuvilani
- 2020 Summer Olympic squad
  - Jane Wacu
  - Leonida Kasaya
  - Sharon Chepchumba
  - Joy Lusenaka
  - Noel Murambi
  - Gladys Ekaru
  - Lorine Chebet
  - Mercy Moim
  - Pamela Jepkirui
  - Agripina Kundu
  - Emmaculate Chemtai
  - Edith Mukuvilani
