= Doris Wanjala =

Kenyan volleyball player (1966–2007)

Doris Wefwafwa

Personal information
- Full name: Doris Wanjala-Wefwafwa
- Nationality: Kenyan
- Born: 24 December 1966
- Died: 11 December 2007 (aged 40)
- Height: 1.70 m (5 ft 7 in)
- Weight: 72 kg (159 lb)

Volleyball information
- Number: 8 (national team)

Career
| Years | Teams |
|---|---|
| 1994-2000 | Kenya Pipeline |

National team
| 1994-2000 | Kenya |

Doris Wanjala-Wefwafwa (24 December 1966 – 11 December 2007) was a Kenyan female volleyball player. She was part of the Kenya women's national volleyball team. She competed with the national team at the 2000 Summer Olympics in Sydney, Australia, finishing 11th. She was also part of the national squad at the 1994 FIVB Volleyball Women's World Championship and 1998 FIVB Volleyball Women's World Championship.

== See also ==
- Kenya at the 2000 Summer Olympics
