= Senegal women's national volleyball team =

National sports team

Senegal
- Association: Senegal Volleyball Federation
- Confederation: CAVB
- FIVB ranking: NR (24 May 2026)

Uniforms
Home

The Senegal women's national volleyball team represents Senegal in international women's volleyball competitions and friendly matches.

Its best result was 4th place at the 2015 and 2017 Women's African Volleyball Championships.

The team lastly qualified for the 2021 Women's African Nations Volleyball Championship.

== Results ==
=== African Championship ===
- (Kenya) 2007 – 5th place
- (Algeria) 2009 – 4th place
- (Kenya) 2011 – 4th place
- (Kenya) 2013 – 4th place
- (Kenya) 2015 – 4th place
- (Cameroon) 2017 – 4th place
- (Egypt) 2019 – (bronze) Bronze medal
- (Rwanda) 2021 – 7th place
- (Cameroon) 2023 – did not qualify
- (Kenya) 2026 – 13th place
