= Esther Barno =

Kenyan volleyball player (born 1968)

Esther Cheboo-Barno

Personal information
- Nationality: Kenyan
- Born: 6 June 1968 (age 58)
- Height: 182 cm (6 ft 0 in)
- Spike: 295 cm (116 in)
- Block: 290 cm (114 in)

Volleyball information
- Number: 6 (national team 1994); 12 (national team 1998)

Career
Years	Teams
1994	Kenya Posta

National team
1994-1998	Kenya

Esther Cheboo-Barno (born 6 June 1968) is a retired Kenyan female volleyball player. She was part of the Kenya women's national volleyball team.

She participated in the 1994 FIVB Volleyball Women's World Championship. On club level she played with Kenya Posta.

== Clubs ==
- Kenya Posta (1994)
