= Janet Wanja =

Kenyan volleyball player (1984–2024)

Personal information
- Nationality: Kenyan
- Born: 24 February 1984; Nairobi, Kenya
- Died: 26 December 2024 (aged 40)
- Height: 175 cm (69 in)
- Weight: 59 kg (130 lb)
- Spike: 299 cm (118 in)
- Block: 287 cm (113 in)

Volleyball information
- Position: Setter

Career
Years	Teams
		Kenya Pipeline Malkia Strikers
2014	Kenya Pipeline

National team
2004–2024	Kenya

Janet Wanja (24 February 1984 – 26 December 2024) was a Kenyan volleyball player, who competed for her Country at the 2004 Summer Olympics in Athens, Greece, wearing the number #7 jersey. There she ended up in eleventh place with the Kenya women's national team.

Wanja went to Mukumu Girls High School. She played for Kenya Commercial Bank and Kenya Pipeline.

In 2007, under their then coach Sammy Kirongo, she led Kenya's national side to its seventh victory at the Women's African Volleyball Championship in the final against Algeria. The Kenyan team included Wanja and she was judged the "best setter". Dorcas Ndasaba was judged "best player" after she gained the final point to deliver Kenya's victory in straight sets.

In 2015 Brackcides Agala was the captain of the national team and Wanja assisted her. The team announced that they refused to play for the 2015 FIVB World Grand Prix in Canberra after several victories. The players were annoyed that they had not been paid allowances that had been promised by the Kenya Volleyball Federation. The boycott was successful and the team played and won against Peru. However, the KVF were not pleased and when the teams were announced for the 2016 Summer Olympics neither Brackcides Agala nor Janet Wanja were asked to the qualifying matches.

In 2017 Wanja was in the Kenya Pipeline team in Cairo as they contested the Women's Africa Club Volleyball Championship.

Wanja was diagnosed with gallbladder cancer, and died on 26 December 2024, at the age of 40.

== Sources ==
- FIVB biography
- Athens 2004
