= Ruth Jepngetich =

Kenyan volleyball player (born 1990)

Personal information
- Nationality: Kenyan
- Born: 9 April 1990 (age 36)
- Height: 186 cm (73 in)
- Weight: 74 kg (163 lb)
- Spike: 194 cm (76 in)
- Block: 199 cm (78 in)

Volleyball information
- Number: 6 (national team)

Career
Years	Teams
2014	Kenya Pipeline Company

National team
2014	Kenya

Ruth Jepngetich (Kenyan English: [dʒepˈŋetitʃ]; born 9 April 1990) is a Kenyan female volleyball player. She is part of the Kenya women's national volleyball team. On club level she played for Kenya Pipeline Company in 2014.
