= Jane Wairimu =

Kenyan volleyball player (born 1985)

Jane Wacū Wasike

Personal information
- Full name: Jane Wacū Wairimū
- Nationality: Kenya
- Born: 24 March 1985 (age 41); Nyeri, Kenya
- Height: 1.75 m (5 ft 9 in)
- Weight: 60 kg (132 lb)
- Spike: 300 cm (118 in)
- Block: 267 cm (105 in)

Volleyball information
- Position: Setter
- Current club: (Seychelles) Anse Royale
- Number: 1

Career
| Years | Teams |
|---|---|
| 2005–2006; 2007–2013; 2014–2015; 2016-2017; 2018-present | Kenya Pipeline; Kenya Prisons (France) VBC Chamalières; Kenya Prisons (Seychelles) Anse Royale |

National team
| 2006-present | Kenya |

Jane Wacū Wairimū (born 24 March 1985) is a Kenyan volleyball player. She is part of the Kenya women's national volleyball team as a setter. She participated at the 2010 FIVB Volleyball Women's World Championship, and at the 2015 FIVB Volleyball Women's World Cup. She played with VBC Chamalières.

In 2021 Wacū was chosen by Head coach Paul Bitok to be in a twelve woman team to compete at the postponed 2020 Olympics in Tokyo. Mercy Moim was chosen to captain Kenya's team. It was the first time that Kenya had qualified since 2003. Bitok chose a similar team to the one that competed at the 2019 FIVB Volleyball World Cup as it had eight players in common. These were Wacū, Edith Mukuvilani, Emmaculate Chemtai and Sharon Chepchumba, Mercy Moim, Leonida Kasaya, Lorine Chebet and Agripina Kundu. The team were trained additionally by Luizomar de Moura of Brazil. The Kenyans lost their first match in Tokyo against the home team of Japan.

== Clubs ==
- Kenya Pipeline
- Kenya Prisons
- (France) VBC Chamalières
