= Esther Wangeci =

Kenyan volleyball player (born 1990)

Personal information
- Nationality: Kenyan
- Born: 22 November 1990 (age 35)
- Height: 180 cm (71 in)
- Weight: 73 kg (161 lb)
- Spike: 302 cm (119 in)
- Block: 296 cm (117 in)

Volleyball information
- Number: 4 (national team)

Career
Years	Teams
2014	Kenya Pipeline Company

National team
2014	Kenya

Esther Wangeci (born 22 November 1990) is a Kenyan female volleyball player. She is part of the Kenya women's national volleyball team.

She participated in the 2014 FIVB Volleyball World Grand Prix. On club level she played for Kenya Pipeline Company in 2014.
