= Madagascar women's national volleyball team =

National sports team

Madagascar
- Association: Madagascar Volleyball Federation
- Confederation: CAVB
- FIVB ranking: NR (2 October 2026)

Uniforms
Home

The Madagascar women's national volleyball team represents Madagascar in international women's volleyball competitions and friendly matches.

Its best result was 3rd place at the 1989 Women's African Volleyball Championship.
