= Jacqueline Makokha =

Kenyan volleyball player (born 1974)

Jackline Makokha

Personal information
- Nationality: Kenyan
- Born: 15 November 1974 (age 51)
- Height: 1.75 m (5 ft 9 in)
- Weight: 63 kg (139 lb)

National team
| 2000 | Kenya |

Jacqueline Makokha or Jackline Makokha (born 15 November 1974) is a former Kenyan female volleyball player. She was part of the Kenya women's national volleyball team.

She participated in the 1994 FIVB Volleyball Women's World Championship. She competed with the national team at the 2000 Summer Olympics in Sydney, Australia, finishing 11th.

== See also ==
- Kenya at the 2000 Summer Olympics
