= Margaret Indakala =

Kenyan volleyball player (born 1962)

Personal information
- Nationality: Kenyan
- Born: 24 August 1962 (age 64)
- Height: 1.78 m (5 ft 10 in)
- Weight: 75 kg (165 lb)

National team
2000	Kenya

Margaret Indakala (born 24 August 1962) is a former Kenyan female volleyball player. She was part of the Kenya women's national volleyball team.

She competed with the national team at the 2000 Summer Olympics in Sydney, Australia, finishing 11th.

== See also ==
- Kenya at the 2000 Summer Olympics
