= Egypt women's national volleyball team =

National sports team

Egypt
- Nickname(s): The Cleopatras
- Association: Egyptian Volleyball Federation
- Confederation: CAVB
- FIVB ranking: 39 ▲26 (2 October 2026)

Uniforms
Home	Away

Summer Olympics
- Appearances: 1 (First in 2028)

World Championship
- Appearances: 4 (First in 1990)
- Best result: 16th place (1990)

African Championship
- Appearances: 15 (First in 1976)
- Best result: (1976, 1989, 2003, 2026)

Egypt women's national volleyball team
Medal record

African Championship
Gold medal – first place	1976 Cairo	Team competition
Gold medal – first place	2003 Nairobi	Team competition
Gold medal – first place	1989 Port Louis	Team competition
Gold medal – first place	2026 Nairobi	Team competition
Silver medal – second place	1985 Tunis	Team competition
Silver medal – second place	1991 Cairo	Team competition
Silver medal – second place	1993 Lagos	Team competition
Silver medal – second place	2023 Yaoundé	Team competition
Bronze medal – third place	1987 Rabat	Team competition
Bronze medal – third place	2005 Abuja	Team competition
Bronze medal – third place	2011 Nairobi	Team competition

The Egypt women's national volleyball team represents Egypt in international women's volleyball competitions and friendly matches.

== Results ==
=== Summer Olympics ===
- 2028 – Qualified

=== World Cup ===
- 1990 – 16th place
- 2002 – 21st place
- 2006 – 21st place
- 2025 – 29th place
- 2027 – Qualified

=== African Championship ===
- 1976 – (gold) Gold medal
- 1985 – (silver) Silver medal
- 1987 – (bronze) Bronze medal
- 1989 – (gold) Gold medal
- 1991 – (silver) Silver medal
- 1993 – (silver) Silver medal
- 2003 – (gold) Gold medal
- 2005 – (bronze) Bronze medal
- 2007 – 4th place
- 2011 – (bronze) Bronze medal
- 2013 – 5th place
- 2017 – (bronze) Bronze medal
- 2019 – 4th place
- 2023 – (silver) Silver medal
- 2026 – (gold) Gold medal

=== All Africa games ===
- 1987 – (gold) Gold medal
- 1991 – (silver) Silver medal
- 1995 – (bronze) Bronze medal
- 1999 – (silver) Silver medal
- 2003 – (silver) Silver medal
- 2007 – 6th place
- 2015 – (bronze) Bronze medal
- 2023 – (gold) Gold medal

=== Mediterranean Games ===
- 1975 – 4th place
- 1979 – 6th place
- 1991 – 7th place
- 2022 – 6th place

=== Pan Arab Games ===
- 1992 – (gold) Gold medal
- 1997 – (gold) Gold medal
- 1999 – (gold) Gold medal
- 2011 – (gold) Gold medal

== See also ==
- Egypt men's national volleyball team
