= Lugulu =

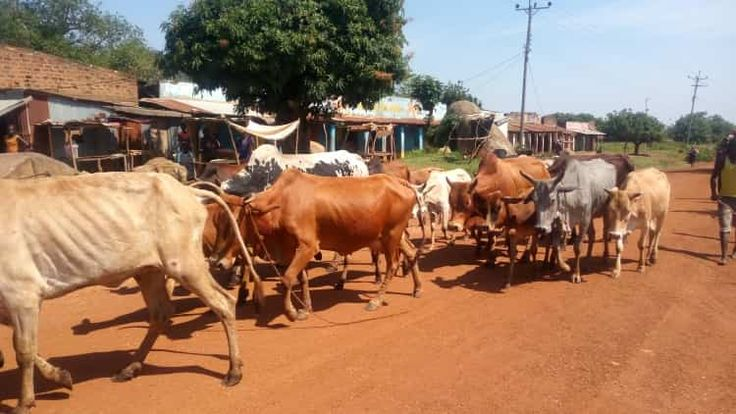

- Location within Kenya
- Coordinates: 0.39°N 34.31°E
- Country: Kenya
- County: Busia County

Government
  - Type: Elugulu Ward
  - MCA: Josephat Wandera
- Time zone: UTC+3 (EAT)

Lugulu is a market centre for the neighbourhoods of Esibembe to the north, Bwaliro to the northeast, and Bulwani to the east in Butula Constituency, which is in Busia County, Kenya. It is located on the road connecting Butula Constituency with the settlement of Nambale. The largest group of residents consists of the Luhya tribe. The current Member of County Assembly for Lugulu Ward is Josephat Wandera, elected in the 2022 general elections.

== Overview ==
Lugulu's existence is attributed to the presence of many huge rocks that create different shapes of caves, similar to Kit-Mikayi. The residents call it "Tsingulu/Mlugulu" in the Luhya language.

== Education ==
The following schools are all located within Lugulu Ward:

- Lugulu AC Secondary School
- Esibembe Primary School
- Lugulu AC Primary School
- Sikura Primary School
- Esibembe Secondary School
- Bulwani Primary School
- Bwaliro Primary School

== See also ==
- Bulwani
- Nambale
