= Sadatoshi Sugawara =

Japanese volleyball player

Olympic medal record

Men's Volleyball
Bronze medal – third place	1964 Tokyo	Team

Sadatoshi Sugawara (菅原 貞敬, Sugawara Sadatoshi; born February 18, 1939) is a Japanese former volleyball player who competed in the 1964 Summer Olympics.

He was born in Noshiro.

In 1964 he was part of the Japanese team which won the bronze medal in the Olympic tournament. He played all nine matches.
