= Violet Makuto =

Kenyan volleyball player (born 1993)

Personal information
- Nationality: Kenyan
- Born: 20 May 1993 (age 33) Kakamega, Kenya
- Height: 167 cm (66 in)
- Weight: 65 kg (143 lb)
- Spike: 298 cm (117 in)
- Block: 290 cm (114 in)

Volleyball information
- Position: Opposite spiker
- Current club: Kenya Pipeline
- Number: 8 (national team)

Career
- Years: Team
- 2014: Kenya Pipeline Company

National team
- Years: Team
- 2014: Kenya

Violet Makuto (born 20 May 1993) is a Kenyan volleyball player. She has been part of the Kenya women's national volleyball team.

She participated in the 2014 FIVB Volleyball World Grand Prix. On club level she played for Kenya Pipeline Company in 2014.

In 2021 Kenya's team for the postponed 2020 Summer Olympics was announced.
