= Leonida Kasaya =

Kenyan volleyball player (born 1993)

Personal information
- Nationality: Kenyan
- Born: 10 October 1993 (age 33); Kakamega, Kenya
- Height: 168 cm (5 ft 6 in)
- Weight: 67 kg (148 lb)
- Spike: 297 cm (117 in)
- Block: 292 cm (115 in)

Volleyball information
- Position: Wing spiker
- Current club: Kenya Pipeline
- Number: 21 (national team)

Career
Years	Teams
2014	Kenya Pipeline company

National team
2014	Kenya

Leonida Kasaya (born 10 October 1993) is a Kenyan volleyball player. She is part of the Kenya women's national volleyball team.

She participated in the 2014 FIVB Volleyball World Grand Prix, 2018 FIVB Volleyball Women's World Championship, 2020 Summer Olympics qualification. On club level she plays for Kenya Pipeline company.

Kasaya was included in the dozen Kenyan players chosen to travel to the postponed 2020 Summer Olympics in Tokyo. Mercy Moim was the captain and their first match was against the home team from Japan which they lost.
