= Emmaculate Chemtai =

Kenyan volleyball player (born 1993)

Personal information
- Nationality: Kenyan
- Born: 14 October 1993 (age 32)

Sport
- Sport: volleyball
- Team: Kenya women's national volleyball team

Emmaculate Chemtai (born 14 October 1993) is a Kenyan volleyball player playing as an opposite spiker. She is part of the Kenya women's national volleyball team.

== Life ==
Chemtai participated in the 2018 FIVB Volleyball Women's World Championship and 2019 FIVB Women's World Cup. She is a member of the team in the women's tournament at the delayed 2020 Summer Olympics. The Kenya national team set off for the Olympics in Tokyo in three batches to try and minimise the chances of being effected by the COVID-19 pandemic.

The Kenyans lost their first match in Tokyo against the home team of Japan.

== Clubs ==
- 2017-2018 Kenya Prisons
