= Moroccan Royal Volleyball Federation =

Governing body of volleyball in Morocco

- Sport: Volleyball; Beach volleyball
- Jurisdiction: Morocco
- Abbreviation: FTVB
- Founded: 1955
- Affiliation: FIVB
- Affiliation date: 1955
- Headquarters: Casablanca
- Location: Morocco

Official website
- www.frmvb.org
- (Morocco)

The Moroccan Royal Volleyball Federation (FRMVB) (Arabic: الجامعة الملكية المغربية للكرة الطائرة; Standard Moroccan Tamazight: ⵜⴰⵙⴷⴰⵡⵉⵜ ⵜⴰⴳⵍⴷⴰⵏⵜ ⵜⴰⵎⵖⵔⴰⴱⵉⵜ ⵏ ⵜⵡⵊⵊⴰ ⵏ ⵜⵔⴰⵜⵙⴰ), is the governing body for Volleyball in Morocco since 1955.

== History ==
The Moroccan Royal Federation has been recognised by FIVB from 1955 and is a member of the African Volleyball Confederation. The FRMVB organize all volleyball activities in morocco for both men and women as well as beach volleyball for both gender.

== See also ==
- Morocco men's national volleyball team
- Morocco women's national volleyball team
- Morocco men's national under-23 volleyball team
- Morocco men's national under-21 volleyball team
- Morocco men's national under-19 volleyball team
- Morocco women's national under-23 volleyball team
- Morocco women's national under-20 volleyball team
- Morocco women's national under-18 volleyball team
