= Mercy Moim =

Kenyan volleyball player (born 1989)

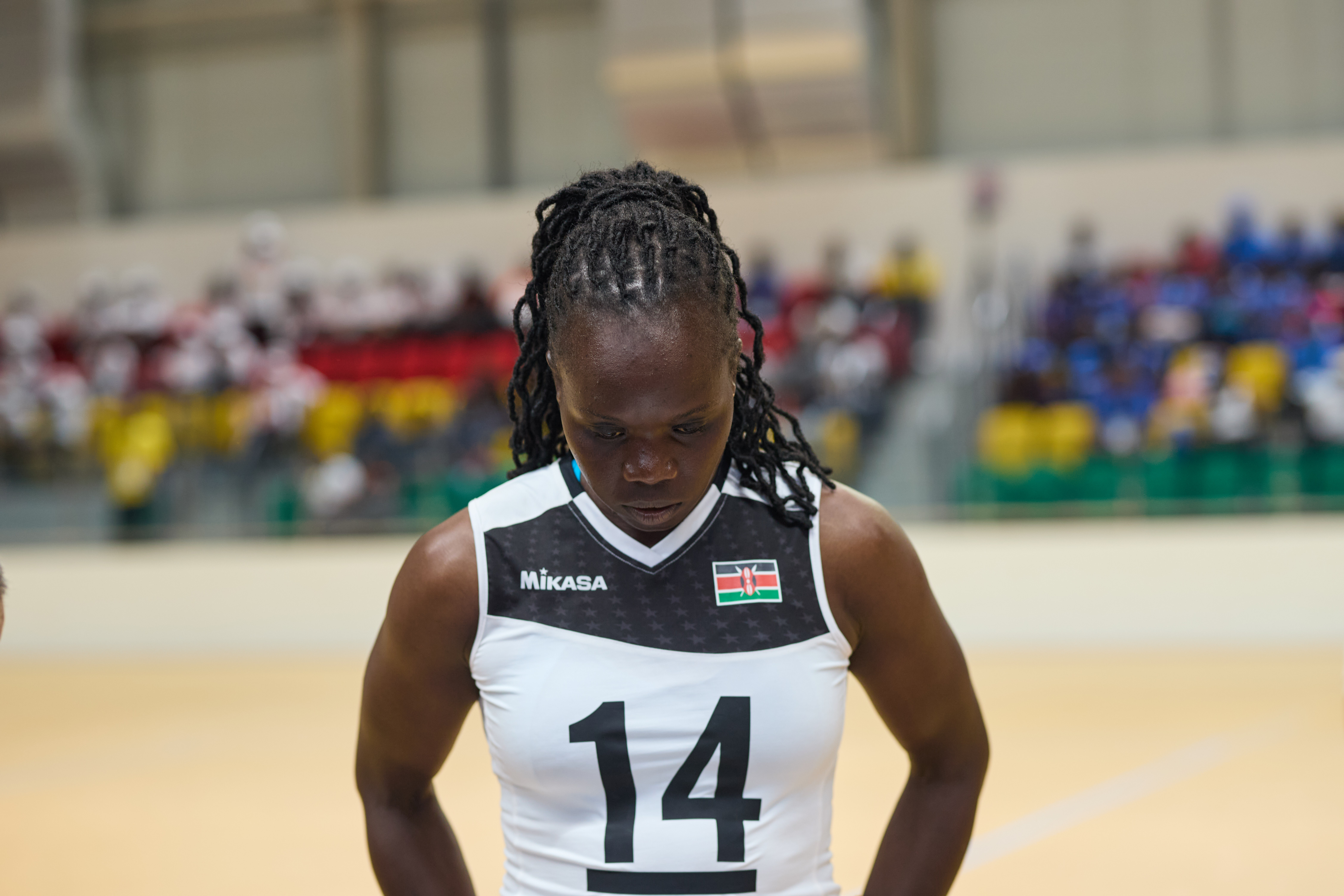
- Mercy Moim at the 2023 African Games

Personal information
- Nationality: Kenyan
- Born: 1 January 1989 (age 37); Trans-Nzoia County, Kenya
- Height: 1.83 m (6 ft 0 in)
- Weight: 70 kg (154 lb)
- Spike: 307 cm (121 in)
- Block: 298 cm (117 in)

Volleyball information
- Position: Outside hitter
- Current club: Kenya Commercial Bank

Career
Years	Teams
2005–2006	Kenya Commercial Bank
2007–2014	Kenya Prisons
2014–2015	Liiga Ploki
2015–2016	Oriveden Ponnistus
2016–2017	Azerrail Baku
2018–2019	Supreme Volleyball Club
2020–present	Kenya Commercial Bank

National team
2005–present	Kenya

Mercy Moim (born 1 January 1989) is a Kenyan volleyball player. She played with the Kenya national team in the 2010 FIVB Women's Volleyball World Championship. She was team captain for the postponed 2020 Summer Olympics in Tokyo (the only women's volleyball team from Africa).

== Life ==
Moim made her debut in the national team at age 15, and she has played for the Supreme Volleyball Club in Thailand.

Moim was chosen to captain Kenya's team in 2016. In 2021, Kenya qualified for the Olympic Games for the first time in sixteen years. She was again the captain for the postponed 2020 Summer Olympics in Tokyo by the coach Paul Bitok. Veteran Jane Wacu also made the cut former colleagues Violet Makuto and Elizabeth Wanyama were not included in the dozen players chosen to travel where they lost their first match against the home team from Japan.

Moim and rugby player Andrew Amonde were chosen as Kenya's flagbearers at the Olympics opening ceremony in Tokyo. Moim was the second woman to be given this honour, following archer Shazad Anwar in 2016.

== Clubs ==
- Kenya Commercial Bank (2005–2006)
- Kenya Prisons (2007–2014)
- (Finland) Liiga Ploki (2014–2015)
- (Finland) Oriveden Ponnistus (2015–2016)
- (Azerbaijan) Azerrail Baku (2016–2017)
- (Thailand) Supreme Chonburi (2019–2020)
- Kenya Commercial Bank (2020–)

== Awards ==
=== Club ===
- 2018–19 Thailand League - Runner-Up, with Supreme Chonburi

Olympic Games
Preceded by Shehzana Anwar	Flagbearer for Kenya; Tokyo 2020 with Andrew Amonde	Succeeded by Triza Atuka; Ferdinand Omanyala
