= Kenya Pipeline (volleyball) =

Kenyan volleyball club

- Founded: 1984
- Manager: Paul Gitau
- League: Women's African Clubs Championship

Uniforms
Home	Away

Kenya Pipeline is a Kenyan volleyball team.

Kenya Pipeline won the Women's African Clubs Championship (volleyball) a total of six times, whereas its last title was in 2005.

At the 2019 Women's African Volleyball Clubs Championship, the team won bronze.

At the 2021 event, Kenya Pipeline was coached by Paul Gitau who succeeded Margaret Indakala. They started out with two victories but were eliminated by the eventual champion Club Féminine de Carthage from Tunisia. The team suffered an injury of Triza Atuka, one of its key players. Egyptian and Moroccan teams did not participate at the event.
