= 2026 Women's African Nations Volleyball Championship =

African women's volleyball tournament

Michuano ya Volleyball ya Wanawake ya Afrika 2026 (Swahili)

Tournament details
- Host country: Kenya
- City: Nairobi
- Dates: 25 August – 4 September
- Teams: 15 (from 1 confederation)
- Venue: 2 (in 1 host city)

Final positions
- Champions: Egypt (4th title)
- Runners-up: Kenya
- Third place: Cameroon
- Fourth place: Rwanda

Tournament awards
- MVP: (Egypt) Mariam Metwally
- Best Setter: (Egypt) Doaa Mohamed
- Best OH: (Egypt) Nada Meawad; (Egypt) Mariam Metwally
- Best MB: (Kenya) Marian Sokoiyo; (Cameroon) Cécile-Laure Nabyong
- Best OPP: (Kenya) Malyne Tata Idechi
- Best Libero: (Egypt) Nada Walid

Tournament statistics
- Matches played: 49

The 2026 Women's African Nations Volleyball Championship is the 22nd edition of the Women's African Nations Volleyball Championship, a biennial international volleyball tournament organised by the African Volleyball Confederation (CAVB) for national women's volleyball teams in Africa. The tournament is taking place from 25 August to 4 September.

The tournament is being held in the Kenya's capital, Nairobi, marking the sixth time the competition has been held in the country, after 2003, 2007, 2011, 2013 and 2015.

15 teams are participating, 3 more than in the previous edition. For the first time, a qualification took place and was held between June and July 2026. Ghana and Zambia return after long absences.

After FIVB's calendar changes starting 2025, this is the first Championship since 1976 to be held in an even-numbered year.

The winner qualifies for the Volleyball tournament at the 2028 Summer Olympics in Los Angeles. The top three finishers will also qualify for the 2027 FIVB Women's Volleyball World Cup in Canada and United States.

Kenya is the defending champion, defeating Egypt 3–0 in the 2023 final in Yaoundé.

== Year change ==
On 22 June 2023, the Fédération Internationale de Volleyball (FIVB) announced a comprehensive restructuring of the international calendar for the 2025–2028 cycle. As part of this overhaul, continental championships shifted from odd-numbered years to even-numbered years, beginning in 2026. The structural change was implemented to prioritize athlete health and recovery by reducing calendar congestion, as well as to streamline the qualification pathways for major global tournaments such as the FIVB World Cup and the Olympic Games.

== Host selection ==
In January 2026, Kenya was given the hosting rights, with the capital, Nairobi, being the host city. This is Kenya's sixth time hosting after 2003, 2007, 2011, 2013 and 2015.

== Teams ==
Initially, 23 teams entered the competition. However, due to the amount of teams entering, the CAVB asked each region to organise qualifiers to narrow the volume of teams to 16. Morocco withdrew before the tournament bring the number of teams down to 15. Of the 15 qualified teams, 10 were present at the previous edition. Alongside Morocco's withdrawal, Lesotho also didn't qualify after not entering qualification. Of the returnees, Ghana comes back for the first time since 1993. Zambia returns after last taking part in 1995. DR Congo, Senegal and Tunisia return after not appearing in 2023. Numbers in brackets indicate their ranking before the tournament.

Qualified teams for the 2026 Women's African Nations Volleyball Championship.

=== Qualified teams ===
Qualification	Host	Dates	Vacancies	Qualified
Host nation		January 2026	1	Kenya (24)
Top ten in 2023	(Cameroon) Yaoundé	16–24 August 2023	~~9~~ 8	Egypt (82); Cameroon (49); Rwanda (64); Algeria (NR); Nigeria (55); ~~Morocco (54)~~; Uganda (NR); Mali (60); Burkina Faso (77)
Zone 1 qualifier	(Algeria) Oran	13–14 July 2026	1	Tunisia (NR)
Zone 2 qualifier	(Cape Verde) Praia	16–18 July 2026	1	Senegal (73)
Zone 3 qualifier	(Ivory Coast) Abidjan	13–19 July 2026	1	Ghana (NR)
Zone 4 qualifier	(Central African Republic) Bangui	22–26 June 2026	1	DR Congo (NR)
Zone 5 qualifier	(Uganda) Kampala	1–5 June 2026	1	Burundi (82)
Zone 6 qualifier	(Zimbabwe) Harare	8–13 June 2026	1	Zambia (NR)

== Draw ==
- 2026 Women's African Nations Volleyball Championship – Drawing of Lots
- Drawing of Lots Live Streaming

The draw took place on 24 August 2026 in Nairobi. Hosts Kenya, alongside Egypt, Cameroon, Rwanda, Algeria, Nigeria, Uganda and Mali, who were all the eight best teams from the 2023 edition taking part, were drawn via the Serpentine system, while the remaining seven teams were drawn normally.

=== Seeding ===
Pot 1
Team	Pos
Kenya (H)	1st
Egypt	2nd
Cameroon	3rd
Rwanda	4th

Pot 2
Team	Pos
Algeria	5th
Nigeria	6th
Uganda	8th
Mali	9th

Pot 3
Team
Burkina Faso
Burundi
DR Congo
Ghana
Senegal
Tunisia
Zambia

=== Draw results ===
Pool A
Pos	Team
A1	Kenya
A2	Mali
A3	Zambia

Pool B
Pos	Team
B1	Egypt
B2	Uganda
B3	Senegal
B4	Burkina Faso

Pool C
Pos	Team
C1	Cameroon
C2	Nigeria
C3	Tunisia
C4	Ghana

Pool D
Pos	Team
D1	Rwanda
D2	Algeria
D3	DR Congo
D4	Burundi

=== Schedule ===
Schedule
Round	Matchday	Date
Preliminary round	All matches	25–27 August 2026
Knockout stage	Round of 16	29 August 2026
Knockout stage	Quarterfinals	1 September 2026
Knockout stage	Semifinals	3 September 2026
Knockout stage	3rd place & Final	4 September 2026

== Venues ==
The venues are the Kasarani Indoor Arena and the Ulinzi Sports Complex in Nairobi.

Nairobi	2026 Women's African Nations Volleyball Championship is located in Kenya	Nairobi
Kasarani Indoor Arena	2026 Women's African Nations Volleyball Championship is located in Kenya	Ulinzi Sports Complex
Capacity: 5,000	2026 Women's African Nations Volleyball Championship is located in Kenya	Capacity: 1,000

== Referees ==
The following 16 referees were selected for the tournament.

- (Algeria) Kahiya Benbaka
- (Bulgaria) Ivaylo Ivanov
- (Burkina Faso) Madina Wennemi Guigma
- (Burundi) Deogratias Niyonzima
- (Cameroon) Marthe Clémence Eyike
- (Democratic Republic of the Congo) Lotutu Ewunda Pitshou
- (Egypt) Taghrid Khattab
- (Italy) Andrea Puecher
- (Kenya) Linnet Omare
- (Mali) Moussa Boubacar
- (Nigeria) Sheba Victoria Jefferson
- (Rwanda) Faustin Nsanzamahoro
- (Senegal) Fatou Ndiaye
- (Tunisia) Zakaria Nemsi
- (Uganda) Nasur Stamil
- (Zambia) Gift Chesekela

== Format ==
The teams were drawn into four groups, three with four teams and one with three. The group stage is used for seeding as every team advances to the round of 16 where it is a straight knockout from then on.

== Preliminary round ==
- Match won 3–0 or 3–1: 3 match points for the winner, 0 match points for the loser
- Match won 3–2: 2 match points for the winner, 1 match point for the loser

=== Tiebreakers ===
1. Number of matches won
2. Match points
3. Sets ratio
4. Points ratio
5. If the tie continues as per the point ratio between two teams, the priority will be given to the team which won the match between them. When the tie in points ratio is between three or more teams, a new classification of these teams in the terms of points 1, 2, 3 and 4 will be made taking into consideration only the matches in which they were opposed to each other.

=== Pool A ===
Pos	Team	Pld	W	L	Pts	SW	SL	SR	SPW	SPL	SPR	Qualification
1	Kenya (H)	2	2	0	6	6	0	MAX	150	79	1.899	Round of 16
2	Zambia	2	1	1	3	3	4	0.750	131	156	0.840	Round of 16
3	Mali	2	0	2	0	1	6	0.167	126	172	0.733	Round of 16

Source: 2026 Women's African Nations Volleyball Championship
(H) Host

25 August 2026; 19:00; Match duration: 1 hr 12 min	Kenya	3–0	Zambia	Kasarani Indoor Arena, Nairobi; Referees: Andrea Puecher (ITA), Madina Wennemi Guigma (BUR)
25 August 2026; 19:00; Match duration: 1 hr 12 min	(25–14, 25–9, 25–11); P2 Report			Kasarani Indoor Arena, Nairobi; Referees: Andrea Puecher (ITA), Madina Wennemi Guigma (BUR)
25 August 2026; 19:00; Match duration: 1 hr 12 min	Scoring leaders			Kasarani Indoor Arena, Nairobi; Referees: Andrea Puecher (ITA), Madina Wennemi Guigma (BUR)
Sokoiyo Marian (11/26)		Total	Lubasi, Nankamba 4
Sokoiyo Marian (6/8)		Attack	Lubasi, Nankamba 3
Sokoiyo Marian (2/5)		Block	four players 1
Sokoiyo Marian (3/13)		Serve

26 August 2026; 14:00; Match duration: 1 hr 50 min	Zambia	3–1	Mali	Ulinzi Sports Complex, Nairobi; Referees: Nasur Stamil (UGA), Kahiya Benbaka (ALG)
26 August 2026; 14:00; Match duration: 1 hr 50 min	(25–19, 22–25, 25–16, 25–21); P2 Report			Ulinzi Sports Complex, Nairobi; Referees: Nasur Stamil (UGA), Kahiya Benbaka (ALG)
26 August 2026; 14:00; Match duration: 1 hr 50 min	Scoring leaders			Ulinzi Sports Complex, Nairobi; Referees: Nasur Stamil (UGA), Kahiya Benbaka (ALG)
Lubasi (21/65)		Total	Dembele, Diarra 10
Lubasi (14/37)		Attack	Dembele, H. Traore 8
Mombotwa (5/12)		Block	Dianka, Diarra 2
Lubasi (4/20)		Serve	A. Traore (2/16)

27 August 2026; 19:00; Match duration: 1 hr 9 min	Mali	0–3	Kenya	Kasarani Indoor Arena, Nairobi; Referees: Gift Chesekela (ZAM), Andrea Puecher (ITA)
27 August 2026; 19:00; Match duration: 1 hr 9 min	(17–25, 10–25, 18–25); P2 Report			Kasarani Indoor Arena, Nairobi; Referees: Gift Chesekela (ZAM), Andrea Puecher (ITA)
27 August 2026; 19:00; Match duration: 1 hr 9 min	Scoring leaders			Kasarani Indoor Arena, Nairobi; Referees: Gift Chesekela (ZAM), Andrea Puecher (ITA)
Diarra (7/29)		Total	Apuoyo (8/21)
Diarra (6/19)		Attack	Adhiambo (7/14)
five players 1		Block	Leting, Misoki 2
Dianka, Sissoko 1		Serve	Apuoyo, Mutinda 2

=== Pool B ===
Pos	Team	Pld	W	L	Pts	SW	SL	SR	SPW	SPL	SPR	Qualification
1	Egypt	3	3	0	9	9	0	MAX	225	102	2.206	Round of 16
2	Uganda	3	2	1	6	6	3	2.000	189	172	1.099	Round of 16
3	Senegal	3	1	2	3	3	6	0.500	157	201	0.781	Round of 16
4	Burkina Faso	3	0	3	0	0	9	0.000	129	225	0.573	Round of 16

Source: 2026 Women's African Nations Volleyball Championship

25 August 2026; 10:00; Match duration: 1 hr 26 min	Senegal	0–3	Uganda	Kasarani Indoor Arena, Nairobi; Referees: Kahiya Benbaka (ALG), Deogratias Niyonzima (BDI)
25 August 2026; 10:00; Match duration: 1 hr 26 min	(21–25, 15–25, 16–25); P2 Report			Kasarani Indoor Arena, Nairobi; Referees: Kahiya Benbaka (ALG), Deogratias Niyonzima (BDI)
25 August 2026; 10:00; Match duration: 1 hr 26 min	Scoring leaders			Kasarani Indoor Arena, Nairobi; Referees: Kahiya Benbaka (ALG), Deogratias Niyonzima (BDI)
Diouf, Thiam 9		Total	Tushemereirwe (17/46)
Thiam (8/23)		Attack	Tushemereirwe (14/29)
Diouf, Gueye 2		Block	three players 3
Diouf (2/9)		Serve	Alungat (2/13)

25 August 2026; 12:30; Match duration: 1 hr 23 min	Egypt	3–0	Burkina Faso	Kasarani Indoor Arena, Nairobi; Referees: Linnet Omare (KEN), Gift Chesekela (ZAM)
25 August 2026; 12:30; Match duration: 1 hr 23 min	(25–3, 25–15, 25–15); P2 Report			Kasarani Indoor Arena, Nairobi; Referees: Linnet Omare (KEN), Gift Chesekela (ZAM)
25 August 2026; 12:30; Match duration: 1 hr 23 min	Scoring leaders			Kasarani Indoor Arena, Nairobi; Referees: Linnet Omare (KEN), Gift Chesekela (ZAM)
Eassa (11/31)		Total	Christine (11/41)
Hazem Tamer (9/13)		Attack	Christine (9/27)
Ahmed (2/5)		Block	three players 1
Eassa (3/12)		Serve	Christine (2/9)

26 August 2026; 11:00; Match duration: 1 hr 6 min	Uganda	3–0	Burkina Faso	Ulinzi Sports Complex, Nairobi; Referees: Sheba Victoria Jefferson (NGA), Jerry Hodo (GHA)
26 August 2026; 11:00; Match duration: 1 hr 6 min	(25–14, 25–13, 25–18); P2 Report			Ulinzi Sports Complex, Nairobi; Referees: Sheba Victoria Jefferson (NGA), Jerry Hodo (GHA)
26 August 2026; 11:00; Match duration: 1 hr 6 min	Scoring leaders			Ulinzi Sports Complex, Nairobi; Referees: Sheba Victoria Jefferson (NGA), Jerry Hodo (GHA)
Tushemereirwe (15/38)		Total	Bila (9/35)
Tushemereirwe (12/24)		Attack	Bila (9/24)
Ainembabazi, Alungat 3		Block	Minougou (4/11)
Tushemereirwe (3/13)		Serve

26 August 2026; 16:00; Match duration: 1 hr	Egypt	3–0	Senegal	Kasarani Indoor Arena, Nairobi; Referees: Gift Chesekela (ZAM), Ivaylo Ivanov (BUL)
26 August 2026; 16:00; Match duration: 1 hr	(25–12, 25–10, 25–8); P2 Report			Kasarani Indoor Arena, Nairobi; Referees: Gift Chesekela (ZAM), Ivaylo Ivanov (BUL)
26 August 2026; 16:00; Match duration: 1 hr	Scoring leaders			Kasarani Indoor Arena, Nairobi; Referees: Gift Chesekela (ZAM), Ivaylo Ivanov (BUL)
Amin (13/25)		Total	three players 4
Amin (9/14)		Attack	three players 4
Amin (3/5)		Block	Faye (2/3)
Metwally (2/20)		Serve

27 August 2026; 10:00; Match duration: 1 hr 9 min	Uganda	0–3	Egypt	Kasarani Indoor Arena, Nairobi
27 August 2026; 10:00; Match duration: 1 hr 9 min	(14–25, 9–25, 16–25); Report			Kasarani Indoor Arena, Nairobi
27 August 2026; 10:00; Match duration: 1 hr 9 min	Scoring leaders			Kasarani Indoor Arena, Nairobi
Ainembabazi 9		Total	Houssameldein, Metwally 9
Ainembabazi, Alungat (8/21)		Attack	Amin, Metwally 8
Ainembabazi, Alungat 1		Block	Abdelmaguid (2/8)
		Serve	Houssameldein (2/10)

27 August 2026; 13:00; Match duration: 1 hr 20 min	Burkina Faso	0–3	Senegal	Kasarani Indoor Arena, Nairobi; Referees: Lotutu Ewunda Pitshou (DRC), Sheba Victoria Jefferson (NGA)
27 August 2026; 13:00; Match duration: 1 hr 20 min	(17–25, 14–25, 20–25); P2 Report			Kasarani Indoor Arena, Nairobi; Referees: Lotutu Ewunda Pitshou (DRC), Sheba Victoria Jefferson (NGA)
27 August 2026; 13:00; Match duration: 1 hr 20 min	Scoring leaders			Kasarani Indoor Arena, Nairobi; Referees: Lotutu Ewunda Pitshou (DRC), Sheba Victoria Jefferson (NGA)
Dankambary (10/30)		Total	Diouf (14/41)
Dankambary (9/22)		Attack	Diouf (14/27)
four players 1		Block	Ndoye (2/4)
Ouedraogo (1/10)		Serve	three players 2

=== Pool C ===
Pos	Team	Pld	W	L	Pts	SW	SL	SR	SPW	SPL	SPR	Qualification
1	Cameroon	3	3	0	9	9	0	MAX	225	159	1.415	Round of 16
2	Tunisia	3	1	2	4	5	7	0.714	256	268	0.955	Round of 16
3	Ghana	3	1	2	3	5	8	0.625	253	280	0.904	Round of 16
4	Nigeria	3	1	2	2	4	8	0.500	239	266	0.898	Round of 16

Source: 2026 Women's African Nations Volleyball Championship

25 August 2026; 15:00; Match duration: 1 hr 27 min	Cameroon	3–0	Ghana	Kasarani Indoor Arena, Nairobi; Referees: Ivaylo Ivanov (BUL), Faustin Nsanzamahoro (RWA)
25 August 2026; 15:00; Match duration: 1 hr 27 min	(25–16, 25–20, 25–14); P2 Report			Kasarani Indoor Arena, Nairobi; Referees: Ivaylo Ivanov (BUL), Faustin Nsanzamahoro (RWA)
25 August 2026; 15:00; Match duration: 1 hr 27 min	Scoring leaders			Kasarani Indoor Arena, Nairobi; Referees: Ivaylo Ivanov (BUL), Faustin Nsanzamahoro (RWA)
Adiana (11/26)		Total	Mawuse, Moro 10
Adiana (11/16)		Attack	Moro (9/24)
Nabyong (7/14)		Block	Ayepoa (3/13)
three players 1		Serve	Mawuse (2/8)

25 August 2026; 15:00; Match duration: 2 hr 5 min	Tunisia	3–1	Nigeria	Kasarani Indoor Arena, Nairobi; Referees: Marthe Clémence Eyike (CMR), Lotutu Ewunda Pitshou (DRC)
25 August 2026; 15:00; Match duration: 2 hr 5 min	(18–25, 25–23, 25–20, 25–20); P2 Report			Kasarani Indoor Arena, Nairobi; Referees: Marthe Clémence Eyike (CMR), Lotutu Ewunda Pitshou (DRC)
25 August 2026; 15:00; Match duration: 2 hr 5 min	Scoring leaders			Kasarani Indoor Arena, Nairobi; Referees: Marthe Clémence Eyike (CMR), Lotutu Ewunda Pitshou (DRC)
S. Bouraoui (13/41)		Total	Ukpabi (15/58)
S. Bouraoui (11/25)		Attack	Ukpabi (13/36)
Jenhani, Jeridi 2		Block	Okekearu (2/8)
five players 1		Serve	three players 1

26 August 2026; 17:00; Match duration: 2 hr 8 min	Nigeria	3–2	Ghana	Ulinzi Sports Complex, Nairobi; Referees: Faustin Nsanzamahoro (RWA), Deogratias Niyonzima (BDI)
26 August 2026; 17:00; Match duration: 2 hr 8 min	(25–21, 21–25, 25–11, 11–25, 18–16); P2 Report			Ulinzi Sports Complex, Nairobi; Referees: Faustin Nsanzamahoro (RWA), Deogratias Niyonzima (BDI)
26 August 2026; 17:00; Match duration: 2 hr 8 min	Scoring leaders			Ulinzi Sports Complex, Nairobi; Referees: Faustin Nsanzamahoro (RWA), Deogratias Niyonzima (BDI)
Ndidiamaka, Sunday 16		Total	Mawuse (15/61)
Maryann (14/38)		Attack	three players 9
Sunday (5/16)		Block	Mawuse, Wahidu 5
Ndidiamaka (2/17)		Serve	Dagadu, Moro 3

26 August 2026; 19:00; Match duration: 1 hr 28 min	Cameroon	3–0	Tunisia	Kasarani Indoor Arena, Nairobi; Referees: Andrea Puecher (ITA), Linnet Omare (KEN)
26 August 2026; 19:00; Match duration: 1 hr 28 min	(25–18, 25–17, 25–23); P2 Report			Kasarani Indoor Arena, Nairobi; Referees: Andrea Puecher (ITA), Linnet Omare (KEN)
26 August 2026; 19:00; Match duration: 1 hr 28 min	Scoring leaders			Kasarani Indoor Arena, Nairobi; Referees: Andrea Puecher (ITA), Linnet Omare (KEN)
Djeutchoko (14/34)		Total	Abda, S. Bouraoui 9
Djeutchoko (12/25)		Attack	Abda (8/31)
Blamdai (3/8)		Block	Jenhani (5/9)
E. Bikatal (3/15)		Serve	S. Bouraoui (1/12)

27 August 2026; 16:00; Match duration: 1 hr 14 min	Nigeria	0–3	Cameroon	Kasarani Indoor Arena, Nairobi; Referees: Kahiya Benbaka (ALG), Jerry Hodo (GHA)
27 August 2026; 16:00; Match duration: 1 hr 14 min	(20–25, 15–25, 16–25); P2 Report			Kasarani Indoor Arena, Nairobi; Referees: Kahiya Benbaka (ALG), Jerry Hodo (GHA)
27 August 2026; 16:00; Match duration: 1 hr 14 min	Scoring leaders			Kasarani Indoor Arena, Nairobi; Referees: Kahiya Benbaka (ALG), Jerry Hodo (GHA)
Maryann (11/40)		Total	B. Bikatal (13/46)
Maryann (10/28)		Attack	B. Bikatal (10/28)
Sunday (2/11)		Block	Nabyong, Sourea 3
Opeyemi (2/8)		Serve	Emilienne (2/10)

27 August 2026; 17:00; Match duration: 2 hr 19 min	Ghana	3–2	Tunisia	Ulinzi Sports Complex, Nairobi; Referees: Taghrid Khattab (EGY), Fatou Ndiaye (SEN)
27 August 2026; 17:00; Match duration: 2 hr 19 min	(20–25, 25–18, 27–25, 18–25, 15–12); P2 Report			Ulinzi Sports Complex, Nairobi; Referees: Taghrid Khattab (EGY), Fatou Ndiaye (SEN)
27 August 2026; 17:00; Match duration: 2 hr 19 min	Scoring leaders			Ulinzi Sports Complex, Nairobi; Referees: Taghrid Khattab (EGY), Fatou Ndiaye (SEN)
Mawuse, Moro 20		Total	Abda (25/65)
Moro (16/40)		Attack	Abda (22/40)
Mawuse, Moro 4		Block	Baazaoui (4/7)
four players 1		Serve	Ben Hamida (2/13)

=== Pool D ===
Pos	Team	Pld	W	L	Pts	SW	SL	SR	SPW	SPL	SPR	Qualification
1	Rwanda	3	3	0	9	9	0	MAX	225	136	1.654	Round of 16
2	Algeria	3	2	1	6	6	3	2.000	208	162	1.284	Round of 16
3	DR Congo	3	1	2	3	3	6	0.500	161	199	0.809	Round of 16
4	Burundi	3	0	3	0	0	9	0.000	128	225	0.569	Round of 16

Source: 2026 Women's African Nations Volleyball Championship

25 August 2026; 10:00; Match duration:1 hr 16 min	DR Congo	3–0	Burundi	Ulinzi Sports Complex, Nairobi; Referees: Zakaria Nemsi (TUN), Sheba Victoria Jefferson (NGA)
25 August 2026; 10:00; Match duration:1 hr 16 min	(25–16, 25–17, 25–16); P2 Report			Ulinzi Sports Complex, Nairobi; Referees: Zakaria Nemsi (TUN), Sheba Victoria Jefferson (NGA)
25 August 2026; 10:00; Match duration:1 hr 16 min	Scoring leaders			Ulinzi Sports Complex, Nairobi; Referees: Zakaria Nemsi (TUN), Sheba Victoria Jefferson (NGA)
Makiese Ndongo (17/32)		Total	E. Igiraneza (8/28)
Makiese Ndongo (13/20)		Attack	E. Igiraneza (7/16)
Kanyinda, Makiese Ndongo 3		Block	Niyomahoro (3/4)
Tshibonge Mbombo (2/5)		Serve

25 August 2026; 12:30; Match duration: 1 hr 33 min	Rwanda	3–0	Algeria	Ulinzi Sports Complex, Nairobi; Referees: Taghrid Khattab (EGY), Fatou Ndiaye (SEN)
25 August 2026; 12:30; Match duration: 1 hr 33 min	(25–22, 25–20, 25–16); P2 Report			Ulinzi Sports Complex, Nairobi; Referees: Taghrid Khattab (EGY), Fatou Ndiaye (SEN)
25 August 2026; 12:30; Match duration: 1 hr 33 min	Scoring leaders			Ulinzi Sports Complex, Nairobi; Referees: Taghrid Khattab (EGY), Fatou Ndiaye (SEN)
Munezero (16/35)		Total	Abderrahim (10/30)
Munezero (13/24)		Attack	Abderrahim (9/21)
Dusabe (6/9)		Block	Rabah-Mazari, Djouhri 2
Dusabe (3/11)		Serve	three players 1

26 August 2026; 10:00; Match duration: 1 hr 25 min	DR Congo	0–3	Rwanda	Kasarani Indoor Arena, Nairobi; Referees: Moussa Boubacar (MLI), Taghrid Khattab (EGY)
26 August 2026; 10:00; Match duration: 1 hr 25 min	(17–25, 15–25, 16–25); P2 Report			Kasarani Indoor Arena, Nairobi; Referees: Moussa Boubacar (MLI), Taghrid Khattab (EGY)
26 August 2026; 10:00; Match duration: 1 hr 25 min	Scoring leaders			Kasarani Indoor Arena, Nairobi; Referees: Moussa Boubacar (MLI), Taghrid Khattab (EGY)
Divine (15/49)		Total	Makiese Ndongo (13/39)
Divine (12/24)		Attack	Makiese Ndongo (11/38)
Dusabe (6/10)		Block	Kanyinda (3/5)
Musabyemaliya (2/10)		Serve	Makiese Ndongo, Mbu Eketshi 1

26 August 2026; 13:00; Match duration:1 hr 25 min	Algeria	3–0	Burundi	Ulinzi Sports Complex, Nairobi
26 August 2026; 13:00; Match duration:1 hr 25 min	(25–18, 25–13, 25–18); Report			Ulinzi Sports Complex, Nairobi
26 August 2026; 13:00; Match duration:1 hr 25 min	Scoring leaders			Ulinzi Sports Complex, Nairobi
Rahmani 9		Total	Icishatse 11
Rabah-Mazari (8/15)		Attack	Icishatse, M. Igiraneza 7
Beldjenna, Moulla 2		Block	Icishatse (2/8)
Rahmani (4/15)		Serve	Icishatse (2/10)

27 August 2026; 11:00; Match duration: 1 hr 9 min	Burundi	0–3	Rwanda	Ulinzi Sports Complex, Nairobi; Referees: Madina Wennemi Guigma (BUR), Moussa Boubacar (MLI)
27 August 2026; 11:00; Match duration: 1 hr 9 min	(6–25, 11–25, 13–25); P2 Report			Ulinzi Sports Complex, Nairobi; Referees: Madina Wennemi Guigma (BUR), Moussa Boubacar (MLI)
27 August 2026; 11:00; Match duration: 1 hr 9 min	Scoring leaders			Ulinzi Sports Complex, Nairobi; Referees: Madina Wennemi Guigma (BUR), Moussa Boubacar (MLI)
Icishatse (5/22)		Total	Musaniwabo (12/32)
Icishatse (4/15)		Attack	three players 7
M. Igiraneza (2/8)		Block	Musaniwabo (3/9)
		Serve	Musaniwabo (3/12)

27 August 2026; 14:00; Match duration: 1 hr 6 min	Algeria	3–0	DR Congo	Ulinzi Sports Complex, Nairobi; Referees: Marthe Clémence Eyike (CMR), Faustin Nsanzamahoro (RWA)
27 August 2026; 14:00; Match duration: 1 hr 6 min	(25–12, 25–16, 25–10); P2 Report			Ulinzi Sports Complex, Nairobi; Referees: Marthe Clémence Eyike (CMR), Faustin Nsanzamahoro (RWA)
27 August 2026; 14:00; Match duration: 1 hr 6 min	Scoring leaders			Ulinzi Sports Complex, Nairobi; Referees: Marthe Clémence Eyike (CMR), Faustin Nsanzamahoro (RWA)
Abderrahim (17/37)		Total	Makiese Ndongo (10/34)
Abderrahim (13/20)		Attack	Makiese Ndongo (10/28)
Abderrahim (3/4)		Block	Lemfuka, Mongé 1
Rabah-Mazari (3/26)		Serve	Kanyinda (1/9)

== Final round ==
=== Bracket ===
Round of 16
29 August
Cameroon
Bye
29 August
Uganda	3
DR Congo	0
29 August
Kenya	3
Nigeria	0
29 August
Algeria	3
Senegal	0
30 August
Rwanda	3
Burkina Faso	0
30 August
Zambia	1
Ghana	3
30 August
Egypt	3
Burundi	0
30 August
Tunisia	3
Mali	0

Quarterfinals
1 September
Cameroon	3
Uganda	0
1 September
Kenya	3
Algeria	1
1 September
Rwanda	3
Ghana	1
1 September
Egypt	3
Tunisia	0

Semifinals
3 September
Cameroon	0
Kenya	3
3 September
Rwanda	0
Egypt	3

Final
4 September
Kenya	0
Egypt	3
3rd place match
4 September
Cameroon	3
Rwanda	0

=== 5–8 classification bracket ===
5th-8th semifinals
2 September
Uganda	2
Algeria	3
2 September
Ghana	1
Tunisia	3

5th place match
3 September
Algeria	0
Tunisia	3
7th place match
3 September
Uganda	2
Ghana	3

==== Round of 16 ====
29 August 2026; 13:00; Match duration: 1 hr 17min	Uganda	3–0	DR Congo	Kasarani Indoor Arena, Nairobi
29 August 2026; 13:00; Match duration: 1 hr 17min	(25–16, 27–25, 25–18); Report			Kasarani Indoor Arena, Nairobi
29 August 2026; 13:00; Match duration: 1 hr 17min	Scoring leaders			Kasarani Indoor Arena, Nairobi
Tushemereirwe 15		Total	Makiese 22
Tushemereirwe (14/30)		Attack	Makiese (18/47)
J. Alungat, S. Alungat 4		Block	Kanyinda (4/10)
J. Alungat (3/14)		Serve	Mongé (2/11)

29 August 2026; 16:00; Match duration: 1 hr 23min	Algeria	3–0	Senegal	Kasarani Indoor Arena, Nairobi; Referees: Marthe Clémence Eyike (CMR), Ivaylo Ivanov (BUL)
29 August 2026; 16:00; Match duration: 1 hr 23min	(25–15, 25–17, 25–16); P2Report			Kasarani Indoor Arena, Nairobi; Referees: Marthe Clémence Eyike (CMR), Ivaylo Ivanov (BUL)
29 August 2026; 16:00; Match duration: 1 hr 23min	Scoring leaders			Kasarani Indoor Arena, Nairobi; Referees: Marthe Clémence Eyike (CMR), Ivaylo Ivanov (BUL)
Abderrahim, Rahmani 10		Total	Faye 9
Abderrahim (9/16)		Attack	Faye (8/15)
Rahmani (4/7)		Block	three players 1
Rabah-Mazari, Rahmani 4		Serve	Faye (1/10)

29 August 2026; 19:00; Match duration: 1 hr 15 min	Kenya	3–0	Nigeria	Kasarani Indoor Arena, Nairobi; Referees: Andrea Puecher (ITA), Kahiya Benbaka (ALG)
29 August 2026; 19:00; Match duration: 1 hr 15 min	(25–21, 25–17, 25–15); P2 Report			Kasarani Indoor Arena, Nairobi; Referees: Andrea Puecher (ITA), Kahiya Benbaka (ALG)
29 August 2026; 19:00; Match duration: 1 hr 15 min	Scoring leaders			Kasarani Indoor Arena, Nairobi; Referees: Andrea Puecher (ITA), Kahiya Benbaka (ALG)
Sokoiyo, Idachi 14		Total	Ibrahim, Ukpabi 7
Idachi (11/21)		Attack	Ibrahim, Ukpabi 7
Sokoiyo (5/13)		Block	Sunday (1/9)
Barasa, Idachi 2		Serve	Paul, Umaru 1

30 August 2026; 10:00; Match duration: 1 hr 08min	Rwanda	3–0	Burkina Faso	Kasarani Indoor Arena, Nairobi; Referees: NIYONZIMA Deogratias (BDI), Taghrid Khattab (EGY)
30 August 2026; 10:00; Match duration: 1 hr 08min	(25–19, 25–16, 25–8); P2Report			Kasarani Indoor Arena, Nairobi; Referees: NIYONZIMA Deogratias (BDI), Taghrid Khattab (EGY)
30 August 2026; 10:00; Match duration: 1 hr 08min	Scoring leaders			Kasarani Indoor Arena, Nairobi; Referees: NIYONZIMA Deogratias (BDI), Taghrid Khattab (EGY)
Nyirahabimana 16		Total	S. Ouédraogo 10
Munézéro, Nyirahabimana 14		Attack	S. Ouédraogo (7/19)
Dusabé (3/10)		Block	S. Ouédraogo (2/9)
Dusabé, Ndagijimana 2		Serve	Dankambary, S. Ouédraogo 1

30 August 2026; 11:00; Match duration: 2 hr 18 min	Zambia	1–3	Ghana	Kasarani Indoor Arena, Nairobi; Referees: Fatou Ndiaye (SEN), Marthe Clémence Eyike (CMR)
30 August 2026; 11:00; Match duration: 2 hr 18 min	(29–27, 20–25, 19–25, 17–25); P2 Report			Kasarani Indoor Arena, Nairobi; Referees: Fatou Ndiaye (SEN), Marthe Clémence Eyike (CMR)
30 August 2026; 11:00; Match duration: 2 hr 18 min	Scoring leaders			Kasarani Indoor Arena, Nairobi; Referees: Fatou Ndiaye (SEN), Marthe Clémence Eyike (CMR)
Lubasi (20/72)		Total	Mawuse (30/84)
Lubasi (14/45)		Attack	Mawuse (22/46)
Lubasi (3/11)		Block	Mawuse (4/20)
Lubasi (3/16)		Serve	Mawuse (4/18)

30 August 2026; 14:00; Match duration: 1 hr 4 min	Egypt	3–0	Burundi	Kasarani Indoor Arena, Nairobi; Referees: Moussa Boubacar (MLI), Zakaria Nemsi (TUN)
30 August 2026; 14:00; Match duration: 1 hr 4 min	(25–7, 25–13, 25–5); P2 Report			Kasarani Indoor Arena, Nairobi; Referees: Moussa Boubacar (MLI), Zakaria Nemsi (TUN)
30 August 2026; 14:00; Match duration: 1 hr 4 min	Scoring leaders			Kasarani Indoor Arena, Nairobi; Referees: Moussa Boubacar (MLI), Zakaria Nemsi (TUN)
Eassa, Houssameldein 10		Total	N. Igiranéza (5/23)
Houssameldein (9/12)		Attack	three players 4
six players 1		Block	N. Igiranéza (1/5)
seven players 1		Serve

30 August 2026; 17:00; Match duration: 1 hr 13 min	Tunisia	3–0	Mali	Kasarani Indoor Arena, Nairobi; Referees: Jerry Hodo (GHA), Andrea Puecher (ITA)
30 August 2026; 17:00; Match duration: 1 hr 13 min	(25–11, 25–15, 25–4); P2 Report			Kasarani Indoor Arena, Nairobi; Referees: Jerry Hodo (GHA), Andrea Puecher (ITA)
30 August 2026; 17:00; Match duration: 1 hr 13 min	Scoring leaders			Kasarani Indoor Arena, Nairobi; Referees: Jerry Hodo (GHA), Andrea Puecher (ITA)
Abda (20/39)		Total	Dembélé (6/23)
Abda (17/22)		Attack	Dembélé (6/18)
S. Bouraoui (4/11)		Block	A. Diarra (2/2)
S. Bouraoui (4/17)		Serve	Sissoko (1/7)

==== Quarterfinals ====
1 September 2026; 10:00; Match duration: 1hr 23min	Cameroon	3–0	Uganda	Venue, Nairobi; Referees: Taghrid Khattab (EGY), Kahiya Benbaka (ALG)
1 September 2026; 10:00; Match duration: 1hr 23min	(25–18, 25–20, 25–18); P2Report			Venue, Nairobi; Referees: Taghrid Khattab (EGY), Kahiya Benbaka (ALG)
1 September 2026; 10:00; Match duration: 1hr 23min	Scoring leaders			Venue, Nairobi; Referees: Taghrid Khattab (EGY), Kahiya Benbaka (ALG)
Adiana 8		Total	Ainembabazi 11
Djeutchoko, Adiana 8		Attack	Tush, Ainembabazi 8
Baran (4/6)		Block	Lamaro, Ainembabazi 2
Kamando (2/10)		Serve	Lamaro, Ainembabazi 1

1 September 2026; 13:00; Match duration: 1hr 58min	Rwanda	3–1	Ghana	Venue, Nairobi; Referees: Zakaria Nemsi (TUN), NIYONZIMA Deogratias (BDI)
1 September 2026; 13:00; Match duration: 1hr 58min	(25–17, 24–26, 25–19, 25–18); P2Report			Venue, Nairobi; Referees: Zakaria Nemsi (TUN), NIYONZIMA Deogratias (BDI)
1 September 2026; 13:00; Match duration: 1hr 58min	Scoring leaders			Venue, Nairobi; Referees: Zakaria Nemsi (TUN), NIYONZIMA Deogratias (BDI)
Tuyishime 22		Total	Mawuse 14
Tuyishime (20/51)		Attack	Mawuse (13/41)
Ndagijimana (3/12)		Block	Huzeifa Moro (5/14)
Valentine (2/29)		Serve	Bedawu (3/13)

1 September 2026; 16:00; Match duration: 1hr 14min	Egypt	3–0	Tunisia	Venue, Nairobi
1 September 2026; 16:00; Match duration: 1hr 14min	(25–20, 25–14, 25–9); Report			Venue, Nairobi
1 September 2026; 16:00; Match duration: 1hr 14min	Scoring leaders			Venue, Nairobi
Metwally 18		Total	Abda 18
Metwally (13/27)		Attack	Abda (18/45)
Metwally (4/11)		Block	Baazaoui (3/10)
(Four Players) 1		Serve	0

1 September 2026; 19:00; Match duration: 1hr 44min	Kenya	3–1	Algeria	Venue, Nairobi; Referees: Ivaylo Ivanov (BUL), Marthe Clémence Eyike (CMR)
1 September 2026; 19:00; Match duration: 1hr 44min	(21–25, 25–7, 25–15, 25–18); P2Report			Venue, Nairobi; Referees: Ivaylo Ivanov (BUL), Marthe Clémence Eyike (CMR)
1 September 2026; 19:00; Match duration: 1hr 44min	Scoring leaders			Venue, Nairobi; Referees: Ivaylo Ivanov (BUL), Marthe Clémence Eyike (CMR)
Tata 15		Total	Abderrahim 12
Adhiambo (9/18)		Attack	Abderrahim (11/30)
Sokoiyo (7/20)		Block	Rahmani (3/9)
Tata (4/24)		Serve	Moulla (2/16)

==== 5–8th semifinals ====
2 September 2026; 10:00; Match duration: 2hr 16min	Algeria	3–2	Uganda	Venue, Nairobi; Referees: Faustin Nsanzamahoro (RWA), Moussa Boubacar (MLI)
2 September 2026; 10:00; Match duration: 2hr 16min	(25–18, 23–25, 25–16, 21–25, 15–10); P2Report			Venue, Nairobi; Referees: Faustin Nsanzamahoro (RWA), Moussa Boubacar (MLI)
2 September 2026; 10:00; Match duration: 2hr 16min	Scoring leaders			Venue, Nairobi; Referees: Faustin Nsanzamahoro (RWA), Moussa Boubacar (MLI)
Abderrahim 30		Total	Tushemereirwe 18
Abderrahim (20/43)		Attack	Tushemereirwe (14/45)
Rahmani (5/20)		Block	Lamaro (8/30)
Abderrahim (7/21)		Serve	Tushemereirwe (3/18)

2 September 2026; 13:00; Match duration: 1hr 43min	Ghana	1–3	Tunisia	Venue, Nairobi; Referees: Kahiya Benbaka (ALG), Taghrid Khattab (EGY)
2 September 2026; 13:00; Match duration: 1hr 43min	(25–23, 15–25, 21–25, 18–25); P2Report			Venue, Nairobi; Referees: Kahiya Benbaka (ALG), Taghrid Khattab (EGY)
2 September 2026; 13:00; Match duration: 1hr 43min	Scoring leaders			Venue, Nairobi; Referees: Kahiya Benbaka (ALG), Taghrid Khattab (EGY)
Sidik 19		Total	Abda 26
Akorli (15/35)		Attack	Abda (23/47)
Sidik (3/7)		Block	Jenhani (4/19)
Sidik (2/15)		Serve	Kebaier (4/24)

==== 7th place game ====
3 September 2026; 10:00; Match duration: 2hr 17min	Uganda	2–3	Ghana	Venue, Nairobi; Referees: Taghrid Khattab (EGY), Lotutu Ewunda Pitshou (COD)
3 September 2026; 10:00; Match duration: 2hr 17min	(25–21, 25–27, 18–25, 25–14, 9–15); P2Report			Venue, Nairobi; Referees: Taghrid Khattab (EGY), Lotutu Ewunda Pitshou (COD)
3 September 2026; 10:00; Match duration: 2hr 17min	Scoring leaders			Venue, Nairobi; Referees: Taghrid Khattab (EGY), Lotutu Ewunda Pitshou (COD)
Alungat 17		Total	Sidik 25
Tushemereirwe (10/28)		Attack	Sidik (19/43)
Alungat (7/19)		Block	Sidik (6/10)
Acelun (3/19)		Serve	Awudu (1/26)

==== 5th place game ====
3 September 2026; 13:00; Match duration: 1hr 20min	Algeria	0–3	Tunisia	Venue, Nairobi; Referees: Marthe Clémence Eyike (CMR), Faustin Nsanzamahoro (RWA)
3 September 2026; 13:00; Match duration: 1hr 20min	(23–25, 10–25 , 13–25); P2Report			Venue, Nairobi; Referees: Marthe Clémence Eyike (CMR), Faustin Nsanzamahoro (RWA)
3 September 2026; 13:00; Match duration: 1hr 20min	Scoring leaders			Venue, Nairobi; Referees: Marthe Clémence Eyike (CMR), Faustin Nsanzamahoro (RWA)
'Three Players' 5		Total	Abda 19
Abderrahim, Soualmi 4		Attack	Abda (15/34)
Djouhri K (2/7)		Block	Jenhani (5/11)
'Three Players' 1		Serve	Kebaier (3/16)

==== Semifinals ====
3 September 2026; 16:00; Match duration: 1hr 19min	Rwanda	0–3	Egypt	Venue, Nairobi
3 September 2026; 16:00; Match duration: 1hr 19min	(5–25, 17–25, 30–32); Report			Venue, Nairobi
3 September 2026; 16:00; Match duration: 1hr 19min	Scoring leaders			Venue, Nairobi
Tuyishime 11		Total	Metwally 14
Tuyishime (11/27)		Attack	Metwally (13/23)
Dusabe (2/11)		Block	Ashraf (5/11)
Dusabe (2/12)		Serve	Abdelmaguid (4/22)

3 September 2026; 19:00; Match duration: 1hr 14min	Kenya	3–0	Cameroon	Venue, Nairobi
3 September 2026; 19:00; Match duration: 1hr 14min	(25–19, 25–20, 25–20); Report			Venue, Nairobi
3 September 2026; 19:00; Match duration: 1hr 14min	Scoring leaders			Venue, Nairobi
Tata 14		Total	Djeutchoko 13
Tata (13/24)		Attack	Djeutchoko (12/20)
Sokoiyo (5/18)		Block	Blamdai (3/10)
Adhiambo (2/8)		Serve	Djeutchoko (1/8)

==== 3rd place match ====
4 September 2026; 15:00; Match duration: 1hr 11min	Cameroon	3–0	Rwanda	Venue, Nairobi
4 September 2026; 15:00; Match duration: 1hr 11min	(25–17, 25–16, 25–19); P2 Report			Venue, Nairobi
4 September 2026; 15:00; Match duration: 1hr 11min	Scoring leaders			Venue, Nairobi
Blamdai 11		Total	Yankurije 15
Blamdai, Adiana 9		Attack	Yankurije (12/37)
Baran, Djeutchoko 3		Block	Yankurije, Musabyemaliya 2
Bikatal E. (2/20)		Serve	'Four Players' 1

==== Final ====
4 September 2026; 18:00; Match duration: 1hr 12min	Kenya	0–3	Egypt	Venue, Nairobi
4 September 2026; 18:00; Match duration: 1hr 12min	(22–25, 15–25, 15–25); P2 Report			Venue, Nairobi
4 September 2026; 18:00; Match duration: 1hr 12min	Scoring leaders			Venue, Nairobi
(0/0)		Attack	(0/0)
(0/0)		Block	(0/0)
(0/0)		Serve	(0/0)

=== 9–15 classification bracket ===
9–15 quarterfinals
31 August
Bye
DR Congo
31 August
Nigeria	3
Senegal	1
31 August
Burkina Faso	0
Zambia	3
31 August
Burundi	0
Mali	3

9–12 semifinals
1 September
DR Congo	2
Nigeria	3
1 September
Zambia	0
Mali	3

9th place match
2 September
Nigeria	3
Mali	0
11th place match
2 September
DR Congo	3
Zambia	0

==== 9–15th quarterfinals ====
31 August 2026; 13:00; Match duration: 1hr 35min	Nigeria	3–1	Senegal	Venue, Nairobi; Referees: Madina Wennemi Guigma (BUR), Nasur Stamil (UGA)
31 August 2026; 13:00; Match duration: 1hr 35min	(25–17, 24–26, 25–12, 25–20); P2 Report			Venue, Nairobi; Referees: Madina Wennemi Guigma (BUR), Nasur Stamil (UGA)
31 August 2026; 13:00; Match duration: 1hr 35min	Scoring leaders			Venue, Nairobi; Referees: Madina Wennemi Guigma (BUR), Nasur Stamil (UGA)
Paul 19		Total	Ndiaye 12
Paul (14/27)		Attack	Ndiaye (11/33)
Sunday (5/16)		Block	Ndoye (2/3)
Sunday (3/15)		Serve	Ndiaye (1/12)

31 August 2026; 16:00; Match duration: 1hr 22min	Burkina Faso	0–3	Zambia	Venue, Nairobi; Referees: Linnet Omare (KEN), Moussa Boubacar (MLI)
31 August 2026; 16:00; Match duration: 1hr 22min	(15–25, 17–25, 13–25); P2 Report			Venue, Nairobi; Referees: Linnet Omare (KEN), Moussa Boubacar (MLI)
31 August 2026; 16:00; Match duration: 1hr 22min	Scoring leaders			Venue, Nairobi; Referees: Linnet Omare (KEN), Moussa Boubacar (MLI)
Sanou 8		Total	Nankamba 15
Sanou (8/30)		Attack	Matongo, Nankamba 10
Minougou (2/9)		Block	three players 2
Minougou (1/7)		Serve	Zulu (4/20)

31 August 2026; 19:00; Match duration: 1hr 05min	Burundi	0–3	Mali	Venue, Nairobi; Referees: Sheba Jefferson (NGR), Fatou Ndiaye (SEN)
31 August 2026; 19:00; Match duration: 1hr 05min	(18–25, 14–25, 17–25); P2Report			Venue, Nairobi; Referees: Sheba Jefferson (NGR), Fatou Ndiaye (SEN)
31 August 2026; 19:00; Match duration: 1hr 05min	Scoring leaders			Venue, Nairobi; Referees: Sheba Jefferson (NGR), Fatou Ndiaye (SEN)
É. Igiranéza, Rone 9		Total	A. Diarra 19
É. Igiranéza (9/24)		Attack	Dembélé (15/28)
three players 1		Block	Dianka, H. Traoré 3
N. Igiranéza (2/9)		Serve	A. Diarra (4/15)

==== 9–12th semifinals ====
1 September 2026; 14:00; Match duration: 1hr 50min	Nigeria	3–2	DR Congo	Venue, Nairobi; Referees: Gift Chesekela (ZAM), Madina Wennemi Guigma (BUR)
1 September 2026; 14:00; Match duration: 1hr 50min	(20–25, 22–25, 25–21, 25–13, 15–13); P2Report			Venue, Nairobi; Referees: Gift Chesekela (ZAM), Madina Wennemi Guigma (BUR)
1 September 2026; 14:00; Match duration: 1hr 50min	Scoring leaders			Venue, Nairobi; Referees: Gift Chesekela (ZAM), Madina Wennemi Guigma (BUR)
Paul 23		Total	Kanyinda 19
Paul (19/45)		Attack	Makiese Ndongo (14/50)
Sunday (6/19)		Block	Kanyinda (3/13)
Ukpabi (3/17)		Serve	Kanyinda (3/16)

1 September 2026; 17:00; Match duration: 1hr 13min	Zambia	0–3	Mali	Venue, Nairobi; Referees: Jerry Hodo (GHA), Sheba Jefferson (NGR)
1 September 2026; 17:00; Match duration: 1hr 13min	(17–25, 23–25, 13–25); P2 Report			Venue, Nairobi; Referees: Jerry Hodo (GHA), Sheba Jefferson (NGR)
1 September 2026; 17:00; Match duration: 1hr 13min	Scoring leaders			Venue, Nairobi; Referees: Jerry Hodo (GHA), Sheba Jefferson (NGR)
Nakena 12		Total	Dembélé 16
Nakena (7/33)		Attack	Dembélé (13/25)
Matongo (3/7)		Block	Dianka, Diakité 3
Nakena (4/9)		Serve	A. Diarra (2/19)

==== 11th place game ====
2 September 2026; 11:00; Match duration: 1hr 07min	DR Congo	3–0	Zambia	Venue, Nairobi; Referees: NIYONZIMA Deogratias (BDI), Jerry Hodo (GHA)
2 September 2026; 11:00; Match duration: 1hr 07min	(25–21, 25–20, 25–14); P2Report			Venue, Nairobi; Referees: NIYONZIMA Deogratias (BDI), Jerry Hodo (GHA)
2 September 2026; 11:00; Match duration: 1hr 07min	Scoring leaders			Venue, Nairobi; Referees: NIYONZIMA Deogratias (BDI), Jerry Hodo (GHA)
Makiese 19		Total	Matongo 14
Makiese (19/38)		Attack	Matongo (12/28)
Mpeti, Mukuna 2		Block	Betina Zulu (2/6)
Mbombo (2/8)		Serve	Annie Kalaba (3/14)

==== 9th place game ====
2 September 2026; 16:00; Match duration: 1hr 48min	Nigeria	3–0	Mali	Venue, Nairobi; Referees: Zakaria Nemsi (TUN), Gift Chesekela (ZAM)
2 September 2026; 16:00; Match duration: 1hr 48min	(25–23, 25–19, 25–14); P2Report			Venue, Nairobi; Referees: Zakaria Nemsi (TUN), Gift Chesekela (ZAM)
2 September 2026; 16:00; Match duration: 1hr 48min	Scoring leaders			Venue, Nairobi; Referees: Zakaria Nemsi (TUN), Gift Chesekela (ZAM)
Ndidiamaka, Ijeoma 15		Total	Dembele 12
Ijeoma (13/35)		Attack	DIAKITE (11/21)
Sunday (5/12)		Block	Sissoko, Dianka 3
Christy P(2/12)		Serve	Dembele (2/14)

=== 13–15 classification bracket ===
13–15 semifinals
1 September
Bye
Senegal
1 September
Burkina Faso	1
Burundi	3

13th place match
2 September
Senegal	3
Burundi	0
15th place match
2 September
Burkina Faso	3
(withdrew)	0

==== 13–15th semifinals ====
1 September 2026; 11:00; Match duration: 1hr 59min	Burkina Faso	1–3	Burundi	Venue, Nairobi
1 September 2026; 11:00; Match duration: 1hr 59min	(23–25, 25–18, 19–25, 20–25); Report			Venue, Nairobi
1 September 2026; 11:00; Match duration: 1hr 59min	Scoring leaders			Venue, Nairobi
S. Ouédraogo 16		Total	N. Igiranéza 21
S. Ouédraogo (15/41)		Attack	Rone (19/50)
Millogo (4/25)		Block	N. Igiranéza (3/17)
C. Ouédraogo, Sanou 2		Serve	N. Igiranéza (2/22)

==== 13th place game ====
2 September 2026; 14:00; Match duration: 1hr 30min	Senegal	3–0	Burundi	Venue, Nairobi; Referees: Sheba Victoria Jefferson (NGR), Madina Wennemi Guigma (BUR)
2 September 2026; 14:00; Match duration: 1hr 30min	(25–17, 25–17, 25–18); P2 Report			Venue, Nairobi; Referees: Sheba Victoria Jefferson (NGR), Madina Wennemi Guigma (BUR)
2 September 2026; 14:00; Match duration: 1hr 30min	Scoring leaders			Venue, Nairobi; Referees: Sheba Victoria Jefferson (NGR), Madina Wennemi Guigma (BUR)
Dione, Ndoye 13		Total	Rone 10
Ndoye (12/19)		Attack	Rone (9/31)
Seck (3/7)		Block	Nsengimana (3/7)
Faye (5/10)		Serve	Nsengimana (1/8)

== Final standing ==
Pos	Team	Pld	W	L	Pts	SW	SL	SR	SPW	SPL	SPR	Qualification
1st place, gold medalist(s)	Egypt	7	7	0	21	21	0	MAX	532	274	1.942	Qualified for the 2027 World Cup, 2028 Summer Olympics, and 2028 African Nations Championship
2nd place, silver medalist(s)	Kenya (H)	6	5	1	15	15	4	3.750	448	331	1.353	Qualified for the 2027 World Cup
3rd place, bronze medalist(s)	Cameroon	6	5	1	15	15	3	5.000	434	342	1.269	Qualified for the 2027 World Cup
4	Rwanda	7	5	2	15	15	7	2.143	503	416	1.209	
5	Tunisia	7	4	3	13	14	11	1.273	547	498	1.098	
6	Algeria	7	4	3	11	13	11	1.182	503	475	1.059	
7	Ghana	7	3	4	8	13	17	0.765	626	664	0.943	
8	Uganda	7	3	4	11	13	12	1.083	518	517	1.002	
9	Nigeria	7	4	3	10	13	14	0.929	573	569	1.007	
10	Mali	6	2	4	6	7	12	0.583	362	424	0.854	
11	DR Congo	6	2	4	7	8	12	0.667	392	438	0.895	
12	Zambia	6	2	4	6	7	13	0.538	399	453	0.881	
13	Senegal	6	2	4	6	7	12	0.583	355	427	0.831	
14	Burundi	7	1	6	3	3	19	0.158	347	537	0.646	
15	Burkina Faso	6	0	6	0	1	18	0.056	304	468	0.650	

(H) Host

== Awards ==
2026 Women's African Nations champions

Egypt
Fourth title

The following awards were given at the conclusion of the tournament:

- Most valuable player
  (Egypt) Mariam Metwally
- Best setter
  (Egypt) Doaa Mohamed
- Best outside hitters
  (Egypt) Nada Meawad
  (Egypt) Mariam Metwally
- Best middle blockers
  (Kenya) Marian Sokoiyo
  (Cameroon) Cécile-Laure Nabyong
- Best opposite spiker
  (Kenya) Malyne Tata Idechi
- Best libero
  (Egypt) Nada Walid

== Statistics ==
=== Top 5 Scorers ===
Rank	Name	Points
1	(Tunisia) Abda. N	127
2	(Ghana) Mawuse	123
3	(Democratic Republic of the Congo) Makiese	97
4	(Nigeria) Christy P	94
5	(Uganda) Tush	92

== See also ==
- 2026 AVC Women's Volleyball Continental Championship
- 2026 Women's European Volleyball Championship
- 2026 Women's NORCECA Volleyball Championship
- 2026 Women's South American Volleyball Championship
