= 2025 FIVB Women's Volleyball World Championship qualification =

- Dates: 20 August 2022 – 30 August 2024
- Teams: 82 (from 5 confederations)

The 2025 FIVB Women's Volleyball World Championship qualification was the qualification process organized by the Fédération Internationale de Volleyball (FIVB) to determine the participating teams for the 2025 FIVB Women's Volleyball World Championship, the 20th edition of the international women's volleyball world championship.

A total of 32 teams qualified to play in the final tournament in Thailand. The host country Thailand and the defending champion Serbia qualified automatically, while the other 30 teams were decided by qualification through the Continental Championships in 2023 and the FIVB World Ranking at the end of August 2024.

== Slot allocation ==
In March 2022, the FIVB Board of Administration approved the new proposed World Championship format. The proposed format increased the number of teams from 24 to 32 to guarantee universality. The new format of the World Championship was confirmed in late 2022 and started with this edition.

The qualification criteria and slot allocation of the expanded World Championship were approved by the FIVB Board of Administration. Similar to the 2022 World Championship, the number of places in the finals allocated to each of the continental zones was not based on the numbers participating in the qualification round and relative performance of the confederations' teams from the previous edition (for example, the NORCECA slot in 2018 was the second most with six due to large numbers of teams in the continental qualifiers (34) and the high performance of their teams in 2014). Every confederation was awarded its slot allocation with three, determined by the ranking of its Continental Championships in 2023. As a courtesy, the host team receives an automatic berth selection, as has happened with the immediate past tournament winner in 2022. The remaining places were determined by the FIVB World Ranking at the end of August 2024, without the continental bias.

== Qualified teams ==
Status of countries with respect to the 2025 FIVB Women's Volleyball World Championship: Qualified for the World Championship Failed to qualify Suspended Neither entered in the Continental Championships nor listed in the FIVB World Ranking at the end of August 2024

The host country Thailand and the defending champion Serbia qualified automatically. Meanwhile, the other fifteen teams (three per confederation) qualified through the Continental Championships in 2023. The remaining fifteen places (twelve from CEV and three from NORCECA) were allocated to the highest-ranked teams according to the FIVB World Rankings at the end of August 2024. Therefore, all of the teams were from all confederations with sixteen from CEV, six from NORCECA, four from AVC, three from CAVB, and another three from CSV.

Of the 32 teams qualified, 21 teams were returning after appearing in the 2022 edition. Slovakia, Slovenia, Sweden and Vietnam made their World Championship debut. Meanwhile, France, Spain, Ukraine, Greece and Egypt returned to the tournament after long absences, having last participated in 1974, 1982, 1994, 2002 and 2006, respectively. Additionally, Cuba and Mexico returned to the tournament after missing the 2022 edition. In contrast, South Korea, Kazakhstan and Croatia, all of whom qualified for the 2022 edition, failed to qualify due to insufficient rankings.

The following thirty-two teams qualified for the tournament, listed by the method of qualification.

Country	Confederation	Qualified as	Qualified on	Previous appearances			Previous best performance
Country	Confederation	Qualified as	Qualified on	Total	First	Last	Previous best performance
Thailand^{a}	AVC	Host country	30 August 2024	6	1998	2022	13th place (1998, 2010, 2018, 2022)
Serbia^{bc}	CEV	Defending champions	15 October 2022	6	1978	2022	Champions (2018, 2022)
Brazil	CSV	2023 South American champions	22 August 2023	17	1956	2022	Runners-up (1994, 2006, 2010, 2022)
Argentina	CSV	2023 South American runners-up	22 August 2023	7	1960	2022	8th place (1960)
Colombia	CSV	2023 South American 3rd placers	22 August 2023	1	2022		21st place (2022)
Kenya	CAVB	2023 African champions	23 August 2023	7	1994	2022	13th place (1994, 1998)
Egypt	CAVB	2023 African runners-up	23 August 2023	3	1990	2006	16th place (1990)
Cameroon	CAVB	2023 African 3rd placers	24 August 2023	4	2006	2022	21st place (2006, 2014, 2018)
Turkey^{d}	CEV	2023 European champions	30 August 2023	5	2006	2022	6th place (2010)
Netherlands	CEV	2023 European 3rd placers	30 August 2023	15	1956	2022	4th place (2018)
Italy^{c}	CEV	2023 European 4th placers	30 August 2023	12	1978	2022	Champions (2002)
Dominican Republic	NORCECA	2023 NORCECA champions	2 September 2023	9	1974	2022	5th place (2014)
United States	NORCECA	2023 NORCECA runners-up	2 September 2023	17	1956	2022	Champions (2014)
Canada	NORCECA	2023 NORCECA 3rd placers	3 September 2023	10	1974	2022	10th place (2022)
China	AVC	2023 Asian runners-up	5 September 2023	15	1956	2022	Champions (1982, 1986)
Japan	AVC	2023 Asian 3rd placers	6 September 2023	17	1960	2022	Champions (1962, 1967, 1974)
Vietnam^{a}	AVC	2023 Asian 4th placers	30 August 2024	0	None		None
Poland	CEV	1st World ranked non-qualified team	30 August 2024	11	1952	2022	Runners-up (1952)
Germany^{e}	CEV	2nd World ranked non-qualified team	30 August 2024	17	1956	2022	4th place (1974, 1986)
Belgium	CEV	3rd World ranked non-qualified team	30 August 2024	4	1956	2022	9th place (2022)
Czech Republic^{fg}	CEV	4th World ranked non-qualified team	30 August 2024	12	1952	2022	3rd place (1952, 1960)
Puerto Rico	NORCECA	5th World ranked non-qualified team	30 August 2024	8	1974	2022	10th place (2002)
Ukraine	CEV	6th World ranked non-qualified team	30 August 2024	1	1994		9th place (1994)
France	CEV	7th World ranked non-qualified team	30 August 2024	3	1952	1974	7th place (1952)
Bulgaria	CEV	8th World ranked non-qualified team	30 August 2024	13	1952	2022	4th place (1952)
Cuba	NORCECA	9th World ranked non-qualified team	30 August 2024	13	1970	2018	Champions (1978, 1994, 1998)
Sweden	CEV	10th World ranked non-qualified team	30 August 2024	0	None		None
Mexico	NORCECA	11th World ranked non-qualified team	30 August 2024	8	1970	2018	10th place (1974)
Slovenia	CEV	12th World ranked non-qualified team	30 August 2024	0	None		None
Slovakia	CEV	13th World ranked non-qualified team	30 August 2024	0	None		None
Spain	CEV	14th World ranked non-qualified team	30 August 2024	1	1982		20th place (1982)
Greece	CEV	15th World ranked non-qualified team	30 August 2024	1	2002		10th place (2002)

Notes
^{a} Originally qualified on 5 September 2023 as the Asian champions. Their spot was allocated to Vietnam, after being awarded hosting rights on 30 August 2024.
^{b} Competed as SFR Yugoslavia in 1978 (1 time) and as Serbia and Montenegro in 2006 (1 time); 4 appearances as Serbia.
^{c} Originally qualified on 15 October 2022 as the defending champions. Their spot was allocated to Italy, after finishing the European Championship as the runners-up.
^{d} Designated as Türkiye since June 2022.
^{e} Competed as East Germany from 1956 to 1990 (7 times) and as West Germany from 1956 to 1990 (8 times); 8 appearances as Germany.
^{f} Designated as Czechia since 2016.
^{g} Competed as Czechoslovakia from 1952 to 1986 (8 times); 4 appearances as Czech Republic.

== Qualification process ==
There were two methods to qualify for the 2025 FIVB Women's Volleyball World Championship: a direct qualification through the 2023 Continental Championships and a qualification based on the FIVB World Ranking at the end of August 2024. The qualification process commenced on 20 August 2022, initially with the qualifiers for the 2023 European Championship. In contrast, four other Continental Championships did not implement a qualification process. The Continental Championships took place between August and September 2023.

The World Ranking qualification pathway was calculated based on each team's performance in the FIVB world-level competitions and the confederation's continental tournaments. During the 2023-2024 national team window, there were a total of twenty-two events contributing to World Ranking points. This started from the 2023 FIVB Volleyball Nations League in May 2023 and continued until the 2026 European Championship qualifiers on 29 August 2024. Each competition had a different factor value for calculating points. The Olympic Games had the highest point factor of 50, with points decreasing progressively based on the importance of the tournament. The point calculation only considered senior national teams, in cases of overlapping tournaments.

=== Continental Championships ===
The following five Continental Championships held to select and qualify teams for the tournament:

Confederation	Tournament		Date	Venue	Teams
AVC (Asia and Oceania)	2023 Asian Championship		30 August – 6 September 2023	Nakhon Ratchasima, Thailand	13+1
CAVB (Africa)	2023 African Championship		16–24 August 2023	Yaoundé, Cameroon	12
CEV (Europe)	2023 European Championship qualification	Pool A	20 August – 11 September 2022	Osijek, Croatia; Tórshavn, Faroe Islands; Hadera, Israel; Piatra Neamț, Romania	3
CEV (Europe)	2023 European Championship qualification	Pool B	20 August – 11 September 2022	(Czech Republic) Tábor, Czechia; Seinäjoki, Finland; Kópavogur, Iceland; Pljevlja, Montenegro	3
CEV (Europe)	2023 European Championship qualification	Pool C	20 August – 10 September 2022	Nicosia, Cyprus (Czech Republic) Kutná Hora and Tábor, Czechia; Budapest, Hungary; Santo Tirso, Portugal	3
CEV (Europe)	2023 European Championship qualification	Pool D	20 August – 10 September 2022	Graz, Austria; Baku, Azerbaijan (Georgia (country)) Tbilisi, Georgia; Maribor, Slovenia	4
CEV (Europe)	2023 European Championship qualification	Pool E	20 August – 11 September 2022	Middelfart, Denmark; Jelgava, Latvia; Poprad, Slovakia; Gijón, Spain	4
CEV (Europe)	2023 European Championship qualification	Pool F	20 August – 11 September 2022	Sarajevo, Bosnia and Herzegovina; Kalamaria, Greece; Tromsø, Norway; Schönenwerd, Switzerland	4
CEV (Europe)	2023 European Championship		15 August – 3 September 2023	Brussels and Ghent, Belgium; Tallinn, Estonia; Düsseldorf, Germany; Florence, Monza, Turin and Verona, Italy	23+1
CSV (South America)	2023 South American Championship		19–23 August 2023	Recife, Brazil	5
NORCECA (North America)	2023 NORCECA Championship		29 August – 3 September 2023	Quebec City, Canada	7
Total	5 Continental Championships		20 August 2022 – 6 September 2023		71+2

=== World Ranking attributed tournaments ===
The following twenty-two tournaments attributed to the World Ranking in 2023 and 2024 national team windows:

Organizers	Tournament		Factor	Date	Venue	Teams
FIVB	2023 Volleyball Nations League		40	30 May – 16 July 2023	Arlington, United States (final)	16
FIVB	2023 Volleyball Challenger Cup		20	27–30 July 2023	Laval, France	8
FIVB	2023 Road to Paris Volleyball Qualifiers	Pool A	35	16–24 September 2023	Ningbo, China	8
FIVB	2023 Road to Paris Volleyball Qualifiers	Pool B	35	16–24 September 2023	Tokyo, Japan	8
FIVB	2023 Road to Paris Volleyball Qualifiers	Pool C	35	16–24 September 2023	Łódź, Poland	8
FIVB	2024 Volleyball Nations League		40	14 May – 23 June 2024	Bangkok, Thailand (final)	16
FIVB	2024 Volleyball Challenger Cup		20	4–7 July 2024	Manila, Philippines	8
FIVB	2024 Olympic Games		50	28 July – 11 August 2024	Paris, France	12
AVC (Asia and Oceania)	2023 AVC Challenge Cup		10	18–25 June 2023	Gresik, Indonesia	11
AVC (Asia and Oceania)	2023 Asian Championship		25	30 August – 6 September 2023	Nakhon Ratchasima, Thailand	14
AVC (Asia and Oceania)	2024 AVC Challenge Cup		10	22–29 May 2024	Manila, Philippines	10
CAVB (Africa)	2023 African Championship		25	16–24 August 2023	Yaoundé, Cameroon	12
CEV (Europe)	2023 European League		10	27 May – 9 July 2023	Lund, Sweden (final); Piatra Neamț, Romania (final)	17
CEV (Europe)	2023 European Championship		25	15 August – 3 September 2023	Brussels and Ghent, Belgium; Tallinn, Estonia; Düsseldorf, Germany; Florence, Monza, Turin and Verona, Italy	24
CEV (Europe)	2024 European League		10	16 May – 16 June 2024	(Czech Republic) Ostrava, Czechia (final)	21
CEV (Europe)	2026 European Championship qualification (Matchday 1–3)	Pool A	17.5	18–29 August 2024	Turku, Finland; Schwerin, Germany; Schönenwerd, Switzerland	3
CEV (Europe)	2026 European Championship qualification (Matchday 1–3)	Pool B	17.5	17–28 August 2024	Kortrijk, Belgium; Birkerød, Denmark; Budapest, Hungary	3
CEV (Europe)	2026 European Championship qualification (Matchday 1–3)	Pool C	17.5	17–29 August 2024	Tallinn, Estonia; Ljubljana, Slovenia	3
CEV (Europe)	2026 European Championship qualification (Matchday 1–3)	Pool D	17.5	17 August 2024	Jelgava, Latvia	2
CEV (Europe)	2026 European Championship qualification (Matchday 1–3)	Pool E	17.5	17–28 August 2024	(Georgia (country)) Tbilisi, Georgia; Santo Tirso, Portugal; Guadalajara, Spain	3
CEV (Europe)	2026 European Championship qualification (Matchday 1–3)	Pool F	17.5	17–28 August 2024	Schwechat, Austria; Kalamaria, Greece; Skopje, North Macedonia	3
CEV (Europe)	2026 European Championship qualification (Matchday 1–3)	Pool G	17.5	17–29 August 2024	Osijek, Croatia; Gjilan, Kosovo; Blaj, Romania	3
CSV (South America)	2023 South American Championship		25	19–23 August 2023	Recife, Brazil	5
NORCECA (North America)	2023 NORCECA Final Four		10	7–12 June 2023	Juana Díaz, Puerto Rico	4
NORCECA (North America)	2023 Pan-American Cup		10	4–14 August 2023	Ponce, Puerto Rico	10
NORCECA (North America)	2023 NORCECA Final Six		10	18–27 August 2023	Santo Domingo, Dominican Republic	6
NORCECA (North America)	2023 NORCECA Championship		25	29 August – 3 September 2023	Quebec City, Canada	7
NORCECA (North America)	2024 NORCECA Final Four		10	5–10 June 2024	Ponce, Puerto Rico	4
NORCECA (North America)	2024 NORCECA Final Six		10	24 June – 1 July 2024	Santo Domingo, Dominican Republic	6
NORCECA (North America)	2024 Pan-American Cup		10	18–25 August 2024	León and Irapuato, Mexico	12
Total	22 World Ranking attributed tournaments			30 May 2023 – 29 August 2024		82

=== Entries ===
Of FIVB's 222 national federations, 62 women's national teams entered or qualified for the Continental Championships in 2023, while Russia and Belarus were barred due to suspension from CEV and FIVB competitions following their country's invasion of Ukraine. For Europe, eleven additional teams entered the qualifiers of their Continental Championship. The other nine teams were listed in the FIVB World Ranking at the end of August 2024, but were not compete in their Continental Championships.

The entries, listed by confederation, with numbers in parentheses indicating final positions in the FIVB World Ranking at the end of August 2024 were:

AVC (17 entries)

- Australia (61)
- China (5)
- Chinese Taipei (46)
- Hong Kong (69)
- India (59)
- Indonesia^{β} (60)
- Iran (64)
- Japan (7)
- Kazakhstan (32)
- Macau^{β} (65)
- Mongolia (75)
- Philippines (58)
- Singapore^{β} (66)
- South Korea (37)
- Thailand (13)
- Uzbekistan (78)
- Vietnam (33)

CAVB (12 entries)

- Algeria (47)
- Burkina Faso (73)
- Burundi (79)
- Cameroon (27)
- Egypt (36)
- Kenya (22)
- Lesotho^{α} (NR)
- Mali (57)
- Morocco (51)
- Nigeria (52)
- Rwanda (62)
- Uganda (67)

CEV (38 entries)

- Austria (40)
- Azerbaijan (35)
- Belgium (14)
- Bosnia and Herzegovina (41)
- Bulgaria (20)
- Croatia (34)
- Cyprus^{α} (NR)
- Czech Republic (15)
- Denmark (77)
- Estonia (50)
- Faroe Islands (74)
- Finland (43)
- France (19)
- Georgia (68)
- Germany (12)
- Greece (30)
- Hungary (38)
- Iceland (76)
- Israel (63)
- Italy (1)
- Kosovo^{β} (70)
- Latvia (49)
- Luxembourg^{β} (72)
- Montenegro (44)
- Netherlands (9)
- North Macedonia^{β} (71)
- Norway^{α} (NR)
- Poland (6)
- Portugal (39)
- Romania (31)
- Serbia (10)
- Slovakia (28)
- Slovenia (26)
- Spain (29)
- Sweden (24)
- Switzerland (45)
- Turkey (4)
- Ukraine (18)

CSV (5 entries)

- Argentina (17)
- Brazil (2)
- Chile (56)
- Colombia (21)
- Peru (42)

NORCECA (10 entries)

- Canada (8)
- Costa Rica (53)
- Cuba (23)
- Dominican Republic (11)
- Mexico (25)
- Puerto Rico (16)
- Suriname^{β} (54)
- Trinidad and Tobago^{β} (48)
- United States (3)
- U.S. Virgin Islands^{β} (55)

Notes
^{α} Entered in the Continental Championships but were not listed in the World Ranking.
^{β} Not entered in the Continental Championships but were listed in the World Ranking.

== Automatic berths ==
FIVB reserved two berths for the host country and the defending champion to participate in the tournament. Serbia qualified automatically as they won their second title in 2022, beating Brazil in three straight sets. On 30 August 2024, the FIVB and the Volleyball World announced that Thailand selected as the sole host of the tournament. Thailand originally qualified on 5 September 2023 as the Asian champions. Its spot was allocated to Vietnam, after being awarded hosting rights.

== Continental Championships ==
As a principal route for the tournament, the top three in each of the five Continental Championships secured the quota places.

=== Asian Championship (AVC) ===
On 5 September 2023, Thailand and China advanced to the final of the 2023 Asian Championship and qualified directly for the World Championship. Japan followed them after beating Vietnam in the bronze medal match the next day. However, when Thailand was named the host country on 30 August 2024, Vietnam qualified instead, making its debut in the tournament.

Already qualified for the World Championship
Qualified for the World Championship

Rank	Team
1st place, gold medalist(s)	Thailand
2nd place, silver medalist(s)	China (AVC1)
3rd place, bronze medalist(s)	Japan (AVC2)
4	Vietnam (AVC3)
5	Kazakhstan
6	South Korea
7	India
8	Australia
9	Chinese Taipei
10	Iran
11	Hong Kong
12	Mongolia
13	Philippines
14	Uzbekistan

=== African Championship (CAVB) ===
On 23 August 2023, Kenya and Egypt won their semifinals of the 2023 African Championship in Yaoundé and secured the CAVB spots. Egypt returned to the World Championship after being absent since 2006. The other spot was awarded to the tournament's host Cameroon, which defeated Rwanda in the bronze medal match the next day.

Qualified for the World Championship

Rank	Team
1st place, gold medalist(s)	Kenya (CAVB1)
2nd place, silver medalist(s)	Egypt (CAVB2)
3rd place, bronze medalist(s)	Cameroon (CAVB3)
4	Rwanda
5	Algeria
6	Nigeria
7	Morocco
8	Uganda
9	Mali
10	Burkina Faso
11	Burundi
12	Lesotho

=== European Championship (CEV) ===
Defending champions Serbia qualified automatically. Therefore, its performance in the 2023 European Championship were not taken into account for the CEV slots. On 30 August 2023, the semifinalists, including Turkey, the Netherlands and Italy qualified for the World Championship, as Serbia reached the semifinals of the 2023 European Championship.

Already qualified for the World Championship
Qualified for the World Championship

Rank	Team
1st place, gold medalist(s)	Turkey (CEV1)
2nd place, silver medalist(s)	Serbia
3rd place, bronze medalist(s)	Netherlands (CEV2)
4	Italy (CEV3)
5	Poland
6	France
7	Bulgaria
8	Czech Republic
9	Ukraine
10	Slovakia
11	Romania
12	Germany
13	Spain
14	Switzerland
15	Belgium
16	Sweden
17	Azerbaijan
18	Bosnia and Herzegovina
19	Greece
20	Slovenia
21	Finland
22	Croatia
23	Estonia
24	Hungary
DNQ	Israel
DNQ	Austria
DNQ	Montenegro
DNQ	Portugal
DNQ	Denmark
DNQ	Latvia
DNQ	Georgia
DNQ	Iceland
DNQ	Cyprus
DNQ	Norway
DNQ	Faroe Islands

=== South American Championship (CSV) ===
On 22 August 2023, Brazil, Argentina and Colombia became qualified teams from CSV by topping the round-robin of the 2023 South American Championship, held in Recife, Brazil.

Qualified for the World Championship

Rank	Team
1st place, gold medalist(s)	Brazil (CSV1)
2nd place, silver medalist(s)	Argentina (CSV2)
3rd place, bronze medalist(s)	Colombia (CSV3)
4	Chile
5	Peru

=== NORCECA Championship ===
On 3 September 2023, the NORCECA slots were awarded to the Dominican Republic and the United States after they surpassed the semifinals of the 2023 NORCECA Championship in Quebec City, Canada. In the bronze medal match the next day, Canada defeated Cuba and qualified for the World Championship.

Qualified for the World Championship

Rank	Team
1st place, gold medalist(s)	Dominican Republic (NORCECA1)
2nd place, silver medalist(s)	United States (NORCECA2)
3rd place, bronze medalist(s)	Canada (NORCECA3)
4	Cuba
5	Mexico
6	Puerto Rico
7	Costa Rica

== World Ranking qualification pathway ==
The remaining fifteen places were allocated to the highest-ranked teams according to the FIVB World Rankings at the end of August 2024. All of these teams were from CEV and NORCECA, with twelve from CEV and three from NORCECA. Slovakia, Slovenia and Sweden made their World Championship debut. Meanwhile, France, Spain, Ukraine and Greece returned to the tournament after long absences, having last participated in 1974, 1982, 1994, and 2002, respectively. Additionally, Cuba and Mexico returned to the tournament after missing the 2022 edition. In contrast, South Korea, Kazakhstan and Croatia, all of whom qualified for the 2022 edition, failed to qualify due to insufficient rankings.

Already qualified for the World Championship
Qualified for the World Championship

Top 40 rankings as of 30 August 2024
Rank	Team	Confederation	Points
1	Italy	CEV	437.03
2	Brazil	CSV	407.09
3	United States	NORCECA	362.27
4	Turkey	CEV	352.61
5	China	AVC	350.30
6	Poland (WR1)	CEV	349.75
7	Japan	AVC	325.18
8	Canada	NORCECA	284.76
9	Netherlands	CEV	283.99
10	Serbia	CEV	280.42
11	Dominican Republic	NORCECA	260.54
12	Germany (WR2)	CEV	222.03
13	Thailand	AVC	194.91
14	Belgium (WR3)	CEV	190.98
15	Czech Republic (WR4)	CEV	189.61
16	Puerto Rico (WR5)	NORCECA	182.58
17	Argentina	CSV	180.96
18	Ukraine (WR6)	CEV	172.15
19	France (WR7)	CEV	157.50
20	Bulgaria (WR8)	CEV	153.92
21	Colombia	CSV	152.37
22	Kenya	CAVB	152.15
23	Cuba (WR9)	NORCECA	145.17
24	Sweden (WR10)	CEV	138.57
25	Mexico (WR11)	NORCECA	138.42
26	Slovenia (WR12)	CEV	137.47
27	Cameroon	CAVB	135.69
28	Slovakia (WR13)	CEV	133.33
29	Spain (WR14)	CEV	123.31
30	Greece (WR15)	CEV	117.40
31	Romania	CEV	113.40
32	Kazakhstan	AVC	112.89
33	Vietnam	AVC	112.73
34	Croatia	CEV	111.33
35	Azerbaijan	CEV	108.95
36	Egypt	CAVB	104.62
37	South Korea	AVC	104.61
38	Hungary	CEV	103.53
39	Portugal	CEV	97.65
40	Austria	CEV	97.01
