= Maryann Kelechukwu =

Nigerian volleyball player

- Born: 11 December 2003 (age 22)
- Occupation: volleyball player

Maryann Kelechukwu (born 11 December 2003) is a Nigerian volleyball player who plays in the Kada Emeralds Team and the Nigeria women's national volleyball team.

== Achievements ==
Kelechukwu plays in Beach volleyball "b" team for the Nigeria women's national volleyball team.

She was part of the team that was invited by the Nigeria Volleyball Federation ahead of the U-19 African and African youth championships in 2018 in Algeria.

Kelechukwu, alongside Tochukwu Nnourge, Isabella Lanju, Albertina Francis and Amarachi Uchechukwu, was part of the Nigeria Tokyo 2020 Olympic qualifiers team invited by the Nigeria Volleyball Federation. The Nigerian team were runners up when Kenya qualified for the postponed 2020 Summer Olympics.

She also featured in the Nigeria Team at the 2019 World Volleyball Championship in Doha, Qatar.

Kelechukwu, alongside Amarachi Uchechukwu, featured at the 2019 CAVB U-21 Beach Cup qualifiers in Accra.

Kada Emeralds defeated the Nigeria Customs Team to be crowned the women champions at the 2023 President Beach Volleyball cup in Kaduna.
