= Aisha Umar =

Nigerian volleyball player

- Occupation: volleyball player

Aisha Umar is a Nigerian volleyball player who plays in the Nigeria Customs Volleyball team and the Nigeria women's national volleyball team.

== Achievements ==
Aisha plays in Beach volleyball "b" team for the Nigeria women's national volleyball team.

Aisha alongside Priscilla Agera and Tochukwu Nnourge defeated Burkina Faso in the opening game at the 2019 Africa Women's Volleyball club championship in Cairo, Egypt.

Aisha was also part of the team invited by the Nigeria Volleyball Federation for the 2021 Africa Volleyball championship in Rwanda. The Nigeria women's team finished in fourth place at the end of the championship.

She alongside Albertina Francis were part of the Nigerian team at the 2018 FIVB Women's World Championship qualifying tournament in Ivory Coast.

The Nigeria Customs Team emerged as champions of the 2022 Nigeria Volleyball Premier League.
