= Francisca Ikhiede =

Nigerian volleyball player (born 1996)

- Born: 17 January 1996 (age 30); Kaduna
- Occupation: volleyball player

Francisca Ikhiede (born 17 January 1996) is a Nigerian volleyball player who plays in the Nigeria Customs team and the Nigeria women's national volleyball team.

== Life ==
Ikhiede was born in Kaduna in 1996. She decided to give up her interest in athletics after watching the National Sports Festival in Kaduna in 2009. She was intrigued by how they played. She went for a try-out session but because no one took any interest she ignored the sport for two years. Finally Sunday Obadofin reached out and gave her coaching.

She has played for the Nigeria Customs Service volleyball team.

Ikhiede plays in Beach volleyball "b" team for the Nigeria women's national volleyball team. At the beginning of 2019 she was in Yaoundé in Cameroon where she and Tochukwu Nnourge won the gold medal at the Camtel International Beach Volleyball Championship. They won the final match despite the cheers of the crowd as their opposition was the Cameroon team.

She also toured Argentina with a Nigerian team of herself, Tochukwu Nnoruga, Isabella Langu and Amara Uchechukwu. The team was created to compete by FIVB at Snow Volleyball. It was the first time she had seen snow and she was very cold during the competitions.

The Nigerian team were runners up when Kenya qualified for the postponed 2020 Summer Olympics. Only four African countries have sent teams to the Olympics. The Kenyan team was Yvonne Wavinya, Brackcides Agala, Phosca Kasisi and Gaudencia Makokha. The Nigerian national team lost at the African Continental Cup Finals in Morocco in 2021. The Kenya team of Wavinga and Kasisi beat Tochukwu Nnoruga and Albertina Francis 2-0 while Agala and Makokha beat the other Nigerian pair of Ikhiede and Amarachi Uchechukwu 2–1.
