= Jane Mwai =

Kenyan volleyball player (born 1970)

Personal information
- Nationality: Kenyan
- Born: 8 August 1970 (age 56)
- Height: 175 m (574 ft 2 in)

Volleyball information
- Number: 4 (national team)

Career
Years	Teams
1994	Kenya Pipeline

National team
1994	Kenya

Jane Mwai (born 8 August 1970) is a retired Kenyan female volleyball player. She was part of the Kenya women's national volleyball team.

She participated in the 1994 FIVB Volleyball Women's World Championship. On club level she played with Kenya Pipeline.

== Clubs ==
- Kenya Pipeline (1994)
