= 2011 Women's African Volleyball Championship =

Tournament details
- Host country: Kenya
- City: Nairobi
- Dates: 17 – 24 August
- Teams: 9
- Venue: 1 (in 1 host city)

Final positions
- Champions: Kenya (7th title)

Tournament statistics
- Matches played: 24

The 2011 Women's African Nations Championship was the 15th edition of the Women's African Volleyball Championship organised by Africa's governing volleyball body, the Confédération Africaine de Volleyball. It was held in Nairobi, Kenya, from 17 to 24 August 2011. The winner qualifies for the 2011 FIVB World Cup, in November, in Japan.

Kenya won the championship defeating Algeria in the final and Egypt finished third defeating Senegal for the bronze medal.

== Competing nations ==
The following national teams have confirmed participation:

- Algeria
- Botswana
- Cameroon
- Egypt
- Kenya
- Nigeria
- Rwanda
- Senegal
- Tunisia

== Venue ==
- Nazarene University Sports Hall in Nairobi, Kenya.

== Format ==
The tournament is played in two stages. In the first stage, the participants are divided in two groups. A single round-robin format is played within each group to determine the teams' group position (as per procedure below). The top four teams in each group advance to the second stage, only the fifth placed team does not and finish the tournament in last place.

In the second stage, the two best teams of each group progress to the semifinals, while the third and fourth placed teams from each group progress to the classification matches (for 5th to 8th place). The second stage of the tournament consists of a single-elimination.

=== Pool standing procedure ===
1. Match points (win = 2 points, loss = 1 point)
2. Number of matches won
3. Sets ratio
4. Points ratio

== Pool composition ==
The drawing of lots was held in Nairobi, Kenya on 16 August.

Pool A	Pool B
Kenya	Algeria
Cameroon	Tunisia
Egypt	Botswana
Nigeria	Rwanda
—N/a	Senegal

== Preliminary round ==
=== Group A ===
Pos	Team	Pld	W	L	Pts	SW	SL	SR	SPW	SPL	SPR	Qualification
1	Kenya	3	3	0	6	9	1	9.000	257	205	1.254	Semifinals
2	Egypt	3	2	1	5	7	5	1.400	270	255	1.059	Semifinals
3	Cameroon	3	1	2	4	5	6	0.833	264	237	1.114	5th–8th place
4	Nigeria	3	0	3	3	0	9	0.000	131	225	0.582	5th–8th place

Date		Score		Set 1	Set 2	Set 3	Set 4	Set 5	Total
17 Aug	Nigeria	0–3	Kenya	11–25	15–25	15–25			41–75
18 Aug	Egypt	3–2	Cameroon	25–23	29–27	19–25	20–25	15–12	108–112
19 Aug	Egypt	3–0	Nigeria	25–16	25–11	25–17			75–44
20 Aug	Kenya	3–0	Cameroon	25–23	32–30	26–24			83–77
21 Aug	Cameroon	3–0	Nigeria	25–11	25–15	25–20			75–46
21 Aug	Egypt	1–3	Kenya	14–25	20–25	26–24	17–25		77–99

=== Group B ===
Pos	Team	Pld	W	L	Pts	SW	SL	SR	SPW	SPL	SPR	Qualification
1	Algeria	4	4	0	8	12	3	4.000	361	287	1.258	Semifinals
2	Senegal	4	3	1	7	9	5	1.800	312	279	1.118	Semifinals
3	Tunisia	4	2	2	6	10	8	1.250	379	354	1.071	5th–8th place
4	Botswana	4	1	3	5	5	10	0.500	298	353	0.844	5th–8th place
5	Rwanda	4	0	4	4	2	12	0.167	255	332	0.768	

Date		Score		Set 1	Set 2	Set 3	Set 4	Set 5	Total
17 Aug	Senegal	0–3	Algeria	15–25	20–25	22–25			57–75
17 Aug	Botswana	1–3	Tunisia	18–25	12–25	25–18	18–25		73–93
18 Aug	Tunisia	3–1	Rwanda	25–12	25–14	16–25	25–14		91–65
18 Aug	Senegal	3–0	Botswana	26–24	25–10	25–14			76–48
19 Aug	Rwanda	0–3	Senegal	22–25	19–25	16–25			57–75
19 Aug	Botswana	1–3	Algeria	22–25	15–25	25–22	24–26		86–98
20 Aug	Botswana	3–1	Rwanda	16–25	25–23	25–21	25-17		91–86
20 Aug	Tunisia	2–3	Algeria	21–25	26–24	10–25	26–24	12–15	95–113
21 Aug	Tunisia	2–3	Senegal	25–20	25–19	16–25	22–25	12–15	98–114
21 Aug	Rwanda	0–3	Algeria	13–25	21–25	15–25			49–75

== Knockout stage ==
=== 5th–8th place bracket ===
Semifinals
Cameroon	3
Botswana	1
Tunisia	3
Nigeria	0

Fifth place
Cameroon	3
Tunisia	2
Seventh place
Botswana	3
Nigeria	2

==== Classification 5th–8th places ====
Date		Score		Set 1	Set 2	Set 3	Set 4	Set 5	Total
22 Aug	Cameroon	3–1	Botswana	25–23	25–22	19–25	25–21		94–91
22 Aug	Tunisia	3–0	Nigeria	25–16	25–15	25–18			75–49

==== Seventh place match ====
Date		Score		Set 1	Set 2	Set 3	Set 4	Set 5	Total
23 Aug	Botswana	3–2	Nigeria	25–22	12–25	20–25	25–16	15–13	97–101

==== Fifth place match ====
Date		Score		Set 1	Set 2	Set 3	Set 4	Set 5	Total
23 Aug	Cameroon	3–2	Tunisia	16–25	25–19	19–25	29–27	15–9	104–105

=== Championship bracket ===
Semifinals
Kenya	3
Senegal	0
Algeria	3
Egypt	1

Final
Kenya	3
Algeria	1
Third place
Senegal	2
Egypt	3

==== Semifinals ====
Date		Score		Set 1	Set 2	Set 3	Set 4	Set 5	Total
22 Aug	Kenya	3–0	Senegal	25–10	25–15	25–18			75–43
22 Aug	Algeria	3–1	Egypt	25–16	27–25	25–27	25–20		102–88

==== Bronze medal match ====
Date		Score		Set 1	Set 2	Set 3	Set 4	Set 5	Total
24 Aug	Senegal	2–3	Egypt	21–25	25–21	20–25	26–24	8–15	100–110

==== Final ====
Date		Score		Set 1	Set 2	Set 3	Set 4	Set 5	Total
24 Aug	Kenya	3–1	Algeria	25-10	17-25	25–21	25-13		92–69

== Final standing ==
Rank	Team
1st place, gold medalist(s)	Kenya
2nd place, silver medalist(s)	Algeria
3rd place, bronze medalist(s)	Egypt
4	Senegal
5	Cameroon
6	Tunisia
7	Botswana
8	Nigeria
9	Rwanda

Source: CAVB.

2011 Women's African Volleyball Championship

Kenya
7th title
