= Kelechi Ndukaba =

Nigerian volleyball player

Personal information
- Nationality: Nigerian

Volleyball information
- Current team: Niger Ravens

Kelechi Ndukaba is a Nigerian volleyball player who plays for Niger Ravens at the team level and represents Nigeria women's national volleyball team at the national level. She was named the 2022 Most Valuable Player (MVP) in the Nigeria Volleyball Premier League, she is also the captain of the Nigeria U21 women's team.

== Career ==
Kelechi was named the Most Valuable Player during the 2022 Nigeria Volleyball Premier League. In 2023, Kelechi was named the Most Valuable Player at the 2023 African U21 Nations Volleyball Championship (Zone 3) where she won seven straight points which put Nigeria at a win of 14 to 3 against Ghana.
