= Mariam Metwally =

Mariam Metwally may refer to:

- Mariam Ibrahim Metwally, Egyptian squash player
- Mariam Metwally (volleyball)
