= Volleyball at the 2016 Summer Olympics – Women's African qualification =

2016 African Olympic Qualification Tournament
Tournament details
- Host country: Cameroon
- Dates: 12–16 February
- Teams: 7
- Venue: 1 (in 1 host city)

The African qualification tournament for the 2016 women's Olympic volleyball tournament was held in Yaoundé, Cameroon, from 12 to 16 February 2016.

== Pools composition ==
Pool A	Pool B
Cameroon (hosts)	Botswana
Tunisia	Algeria
Kenya	Egypt
	Uganda

== Venue ==
- Yaoundé Multipurpose Sports Complex, Yaoundé, Cameroon

== Pool standing procedure ==
1. Number of matches won
2. Match points
3. Sets ratio
4. Points ratio
5. Result of the last match between the tied teams

Match won 3–0 or 3–1: 3 match points for the winner, 0 match points for the loser
Match won 3–2: 2 match points for the winner, 1 match point for the loser

== Preliminary round ==
- All times are West Africa Time (UTC+01:00).

=== Pool A ===
Pos	Team	Pld	W	L	Pts	SW	SL	SR	SPW	SPL	SPR	Qualification
1	Kenya	2	2	0	6	6	1	6.000	170	139	1.223	Semifinals
2	Cameroon	2	1	1	2	4	5	0.800	194	197	0.985	Semifinals
3	Tunisia	2	0	2	1	2	6	0.333	162	190	0.853	5th place match

Date	Time		Score		Set 1	Set 2	Set 3	Set 4	Set 5	Total	Report
12 Feb	18:00	Cameroon	3–2	Tunisia	25–20	25–20	29–31	21–25	15–6	115–102	Report
13 Feb	18:00	Tunisia	0–3	Kenya	20–25	17–25	23–25			60–75	Report
14 Feb	18:00	Kenya	3–1	Cameroon	25–22	25–23	20–25	25–9		95–79	Report

=== Pool B ===
Pos	Team	Pld	W	L	Pts	SW	SL	SR	SPW	SPL	SPR	Qualification
1	Algeria	3	3	0	9	9	1	9.000	243	189	1.286	Semifinals
2	Egypt	3	2	1	6	7	3	2.333	237	193	1.228	Semifinals
3	Botswana	3	1	2	2	3	8	0.375	202	251	0.805	5th place match
4	Uganda	3	0	3	1	2	9	0.222	198	247	0.802	

Date	Time		Score		Set 1	Set 2	Set 3	Set 4	Set 5	Total	Report
12 Feb	13:00	Uganda	0–3	Egypt	12–25	18–25	19–25			49–75	Report
12 Feb	15:00	Algeria	3–0	Botswana	25–22	25–22	25–10			75–54	Report
13 Feb	14:00	Uganda	0–3	Algeria	22–25	14–25	12–25			48–75	Report
13 Feb	16:00	Egypt	3–0	Botswana	25–21	25–13	25–17			75–51	Report
14 Feb	14:00	Botswana	3–2	Uganda	22–25	25–21	25–19	10–25	15–11	97–101	Report
14 Feb	16:00	Algeria	3–1	Egypt	18–25	25–19	25–20	25–23		93–87	Report

== Final round ==
- All times are West Africa Time (UTC+01:00).

=== 5th–6th places ===
Date	Time		Score		Set 1	Set 2	Set 3	Set 4	Set 5	Total	Report
15 Feb	14:00	Tunisia	2–3	Botswana	22–25	22–25	25–17	25–15	10–15	104–97	Report

=== Final four ===
Semifinals
15 February
Kenya	2
Egypt	3
15 February
Algeria	0
Cameroon	3

Final
16 February
Egypt	2
Cameroon	3
3rd place match
16 February
Kenya	3
Algeria	0

==== Semifinals ====
Date	Time		Score		Set 1	Set 2	Set 3	Set 4	Set 5	Total	Report
15 Feb	16:00	Kenya	2–3	Egypt	22–25	26–24	25–16	20–25	17–19	110–109	Report
15 Feb	18:00	Algeria	0–3	Cameroon	20–25	17–25	17–25			54–75	Report

==== 3rd place match ====
Date	Time		Score		Set 1	Set 2	Set 3	Set 4	Set 5	Total	Report
16 Feb	16:00	Kenya	3–0	Algeria	25–19	25–21	26–24			76–64	Report

==== Final ====
Date	Time		Score		Set 1	Set 2	Set 3	Set 4	Set 5	Total	Report
16 Feb	18:00	Egypt	2–3	Cameroon	14–25	27–25	25–21	23–25	7–15	96–111	Report

== Final standing ==
Rank	Team	Qualification
1	Cameroon	2016 Olympic Games
2	Egypt	World Olympic; Qualification Tournament
3	Kenya	World Olympic; Qualification Tournament
4	Algeria	
5	Botswana	
6	Tunisia	
7	Uganda	

== See also ==
Volleyball at the 2016 Summer Olympics – Men's African qualification
