= 2007 Women's African Volleyball Championship =

Tournament details
- Host country: Kenya
- City: Nairobi
- Dates: 5 – 11 September
- Teams: 10
- Venue: 1 (in 1 host city)

Final positions
- Champions: Kenya (6th title)

Tournament awards
- MVP: (Kenya) Dorcas Nakhomicha Ndasaba

Tournament statistics
- Matches played: 24

The 2007 Women's African Nations Championship was the 13th edition of the Women's African Volleyball Championship organised by Africa's governing volleyball body, the Confédération Africaine de Volleyball (CAVB). It was held in Nairobi, Kenya, from 5 to 11 September 2007.

Originally planned to be hosted by Uganda, the tournament changed hosts on 9 August 2007, when the CAVB announced Kenya as the hosts due to Uganda's venue not being ready in time for the tournament. Nairobi was selected as the city

Kenya won the championship defeating Algeria in the final, while Tunisia defeated Egypt to finish third.

== Competing nations ==
The following national teams have confirmed participation:

- Algeria
- Botswana
- Cameroon
- Egypt
- Kenya
- Rwanda
- Senegal
- South Africa
- Tunisia
- Uganda

== Venue ==
Nairobi, Kenya	2007 Women's African Volleyball Championship is located in Kenya
Kasarani Indoor Arena	2007 Women's African Volleyball Championship is located in Kenya
Capacity: 5,000	2007 Women's African Volleyball Championship is located in Kenya

== Format ==
The tournament is played in two stages. In the first stage, the participants are divided in two groups. A single round-robin format is played within each group to determine the teams' group position (as per procedure below). The top two teams in each group advance to the second stage, the remaining teams finish the tournament ranked (5th to 10th) according to the pool standing procedure (below).

In the second stage, the two best teams of each group progress to the semifinals, winners advance to the final and losers advance to the third place match.

=== Pool standing procedure ===
1. Match points (win = 2 points, loss = 1 point)
2. Number of matches won
3. Sets ratio
4. Points ratio

== Pool composition ==
The drawing of lots was held in Nairobi, Kenya on 4 September.

Pool A	Pool B
Kenya	Egypt
Cameroon	Tunisia
Algeria	South Africa
Botswana	Senegal
Uganda	Rwanda

== Group stage ==
- All times are East Africa Time (UTC+03:00).

=== Group A ===
Pos	Team	Pld	W	L	Pts	SW	SL	SR	SPW	SPL	SPR	Qualification
1	Kenya	4	4	0	8	12	0	MAX	300	177	1.695	Semifinals
2	Algeria	4	3	1	7	9	4	2.250	305	265	1.151	Semifinals
3	Cameroon	4	2	2	6	7	7	1.000	288	289	0.997	
4	Botswana	4	1	3	5	4	9	0.444	243	313	0.776	
5	Uganda	4	0	4	4	0	12	0.000	210	302	0.695	

Date	Time		Score		Set 1	Set 2	Set 3	Set 4	Set 5	Total	Report
5 Sep	11:00	Cameroon	1–3	Algeria	20–25	20–25	25–23	11–25		76–98	
5 Sep	17:00	Kenya	3–0	Botswana	25–10	25–14	25–16			75–40	
6 Sep	11:00	Botswana	1–3	Cameroon	25–21	6–25	17–25	22–25		70–96	
6 Sep	17:00	Uganda	0–3	Kenya	20–25	12–25	7–25			39–75	
7 Sep	09:00	Algeria	3–0	Botswana	25–17	25–21	25–18			75–56	
7 Sep	15:00	Cameroon	3–0	Uganda	25–16	25–14	25–16			75–46	
8 Sep	09:00	Uganda	0–3	Algeria	22–25	21–25	15–25			58–75	
8 Sep	17:00	Kenya	3–0	Cameroon	25–12	25–12	25–17			75–41	
9 Sep	09:00	Botswana	3–0	Uganda	27–25	25–23	25–19			77–67	
9 Sep	17:00	Algeria	0–3	Kenya	22–25	20–25	15–25			57–75	

=== Group B ===
Pos	Team	Pld	W	L	Pts	SW	SL	SR	SPW	SPL	SPR	Qualification
1	Tunisia	4	4	0	8	12	2	6.000	348	256	1.359	Semifinals
2	Egypt	4	3	1	7	10	4	2.500	353	272	1.298	Semifinals
3	Senegal	4	2	2	6	8	6	1.333	340	322	1.056	
4	South Africa	4	1	3	5	3	9	0.333	206	275	0.749	
5	Rwanda	4	0	4	4	0	12	0.000	181	303	0.597	

Date	Time		Score		Set 1	Set 2	Set 3	Set 4	Set 5	Total	Report
5 Sep	09:00	Senegal	3–0	Rwanda	25–11	28–26	25–22			78–59	
5 Sep	15:00	Tunisia	3–0	South Africa	25–12	25–13	25–9			75–34	
6 Sep	09:00	Rwanda	0–3	South Africa	19–25	17–25	14–25			50–75	
6 Sep	15:00	Egypt	3–1	Senegal	25–22	30–28	27–29	25–21		107–100	
7 Sep	11:00	South Africa	0–3	Egypt	15–25	17–25	9–25			41–75	
7 Sep	17:00	Tunisia	3–0	Rwanda	25–17	25–10	25–12			75–39	
8 Sep	11:00	Senegal	3–0	South Africa	25–21	25–17	25–18			75–56	
8 Sep	15:00	Egypt	1–3	Tunisia	24–26	25–19	26–28	21–25		96–98	
9 Sep	11:00	Tunisia	3–1	Senegal	24–26	26–24	25–15	25–22		100–87	
9 Sep	15:00	Rwanda	0–3	Egypt	7–25	18–25	8–25			33–75	

== Final round ==
- All times are East Africa Time (UTC+03:00).

Semi finals
10 September
Kenya	3
Egypt	0
10 September
Algeria	3
Tunisia	1

Final
11 September
Kenya	3
Algeria	0
3rd place
11 September
Egypt	1
Tunisia	3

=== Semi finals ===
Date	Time		Score		Set 1	Set 2	Set 3	Set 4	Set 5	Total	Report
10 Sep	15:00	Algeria	3–1	Tunisia	21–25	25–21	25–23	25–18		96–87	
10 Sep	17:00	Kenya	3–0	Egypt	25–22	25–9	25–21			75–52	

=== 3rd Place ===
Date	Time		Score		Set 1	Set 2	Set 3	Set 4	Set 5	Total	Report
11 Sep	14:00	Egypt	1–3	Tunisia	25–18	23–25	21–25	23–25		92–93	

=== Final ===
Date	Time		Score		Set 1	Set 2	Set 3	Set 4	Set 5	Total	Report
11 Sep	16:00	Kenya	3–0	Algeria	25–23	25–22	25–23			75–68	

== Final standing ==
Tournament winner qualify for the 2007 FIVB World Cup.

Rank	Team
1st place, gold medalist(s)	Kenya
2nd place, silver medalist(s)	Algeria
3rd place, bronze medalist(s)	Tunisia
4	Egypt
5	Senegal
6	Cameroon
7	Botswana
8	South Africa
9	Uganda
10	Rwanda

Source: CAVB.

2007 Women's African Volleyball Championship

Kenya
6th title

== Awards ==
- MVP
  (Kenya) Dorcas Nakhomicha Ndasaba
- Best setter
  (Kenya) Janet Wanja
- Best receiver
  (Algeria) Nawal Mansouri
- Best digger
  (Kenya) Milderd Odwako
- Best scorer
  (Tunisia) Nihel Ghoul
- Best spiker
  (Algeria) Faïza Tsabet
- Best blocker
  (Egypt) Ingy El-Shamy
- Best server
  (Algeria) Mouni Abderrahim

Source: CAVB.
