= Purity Ogolla =

Kenyan volleyball player (born 1972)

Personal information
- Nationality: Kenyan
- Born: 17 March 1972 (age 54)
- Height: 169 m (554 ft 6 in)

Volleyball information
- Number: 11 (national team)

Career
Years	Teams
1994	Kenya Pipeline

National team
1994	Kenya

Purity Ogolla (born 17 March 1972) is a retired Kenyan female volleyball player. She was part of the Kenya women's national volleyball team.

She participated in the 1994 FIVB Volleyball Women's World Championship. On club level she played with Kenya Pipeline.

== Clubs ==
- Kenya Pipeline (1994)
