= Phosca Kasisi =

Kenyan volleyball player

Personal information
- Nationality: Kenyan
- Born: 14 February 1993 (age 33); Nairobi

Volleyball information
- Current club: Kenya Commercial Bank

National team
Kenya

Phosca Nekesa Kasisi (born 1993) is a Kenyan female volleyball player who plays for Kenya Commercial Bank. She is in the Kenya women's national volleyball team as captain of the beach volleyball team at the postponed 2020 Summer Olympics in Tokyo. Kenya has never had a beach volleyball team at the Olympics.

== Life ==
Kasisi was born in 1993 in Nairobi.

Kasisi became captain of the beach volleyball team. The team gained Kenya, qualification for the postponed 2020 Summer Olympics which included Kasisi, Brackcides Agala, Yvonne Wavinya and Gaudencia Makokha. They qualified when they won at the African Continental Cup Finals in Morocco in 2021. She and Wavinga beat the Nigerian pair of Tochukwu Nnoruga and Albertina Francis 2-0 while Agala and Makokha beat Francisca Ikhiede and Amara Uchechukwu 2–1.

Kenya's beach volleyballers were in the four Continental Cup winners with Argentina, Cuba and China (who had already gained Olympic qualification). Kenya has never had a beach volleyball team at the Olympics. The four players who qualified will make up Kenya's Olympic beach volleyball team chosen by the coach Sammy Mulinge in 2021.

In February 2023 the beach volleyball circuit finished late and well for Kasisi. She and Yvonne Wavinya won the contest in Mombasa beating the favourites of Naomi Too and Gaudencia Makokha.

== Clubs ==
- Kenya Commercial Bank
