= Ijeoma Ukpabi =

Nigerian volleyball player

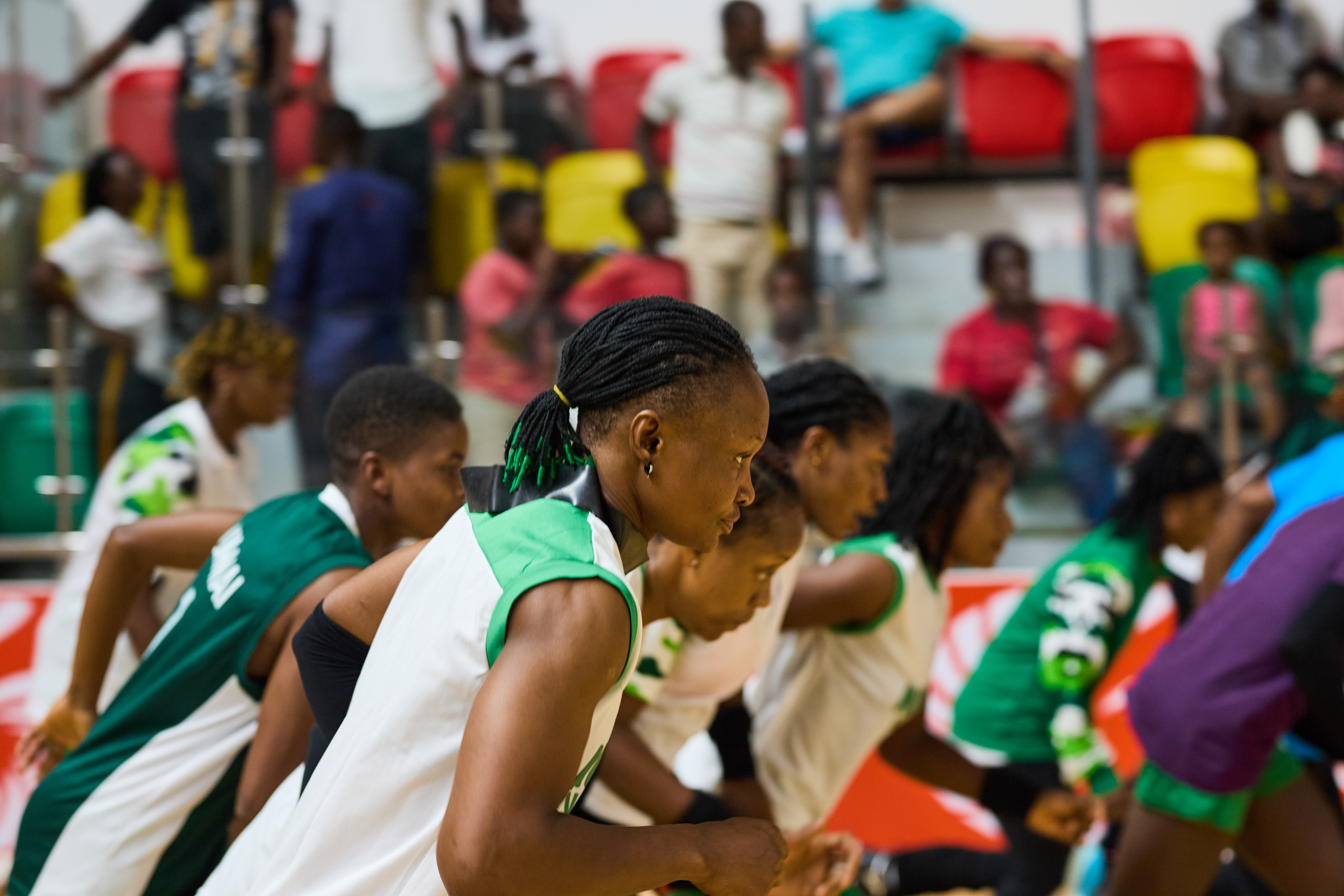
- Ijeoma Ukpabi at the 2023 African Games

Personal information
- Nationality: Nigeria
- Born: 11 June 1994 (age 32)
- Hometown: Umuahia
- Height: 175 cm (5 ft 9 in)
- Weight: 63 kg (139 lb)
- Spike: 290
- Block: 270

Volleyball information
- Position: Outside hitter
- Current club: Chief of Army Staff Spikers(COAS Spikers)

Ijeoma Ukpabi (born June 11, 1994, in Umuahia) is a Nigerian volleyball player who plays as an outside hitter for Chief of Army Staff Spikers(COAS Spikers) and Nigeria women's national volleyball team.

== Boxing ==
Ijeoma Ukpabi was a boxer before starting to play volleyball in 2011.She started her boxing career in 2004 and won the 2006 Gateway Games and 2008 Garden City Games gold medals and stopped her boxing career in 2012.

== Career history ==
=== Nigerian Army Female Volleyball Team (NAFVT) ===
She was part of the Chief Army female volleyball team that won bronze medal for Nigeria in the 2019 Confederation of African Volleyball (CAVB) Zone 3 Clubs Championship that took place in University of Lagos from the 13th April to 19 April 2019 where she won the Championship's Best Spiker Award.

=== Nigeria national team ===
Ukpabi represented Nigeria at the Volleyball Olympic Qualifiers for Tokyo 2020 Olympics.

Ukpabi was part of the 19 volleyball players that Samuel Ajayi named to represent Nigeria for the 21st African Women's Volleyball Championship which takes place from 14 August to 29 August 2023 in Yaounde, Cameroon.

She was selected as the Captain for the 2024 African Games Qualifiers which was scheduled for 4 to 8 January at the National Stadium in Lagos. She played the 2024 African Games Qualifiers with Sharon Achi, Aliyah Usman, Maryam Ibrahim, Mirabel Onyegwu, Happy Wushilang, Blessing Unekwe, Deborah Chukwu, Ifunanya Udeagbala, Kelechi Ndukauba, Albertina Francis and Jummai Bitrus.

Ijeoma Ukpabi was part of the volleyball players that represent Nigeria during the 13th African Games in Ghana which takes place from 8 March to 23 March 2024.
