= 1993 Women's African Volleyball Championship =

The 1993 Women's African Volleyball Championship was the Sixth Edition African continental volleyball Championship for women in Africa and it was held in Lagos, Nigeria, with Ten teams participated.

== Teams ==
- Botswana
- Cameroon
- Egypt
- Ethiopia
- Ghana
- Kenya
- Mauritius
- Nigeria
- South Africa
- Tunisia

== Final ranking ==
Rank	Team
1st place, gold medalist(s)	Kenya
2nd place, silver medalist(s)	Egypt
3rd place, bronze medalist(s)	Nigeria
4	Cameroon
5	Ethiopia
6	Tunisia
7	Mauritius
8	South Africa
9	Ghana
10	Botswana

1993 Women's African champions

Kenya
Second title
