= Mariam Metwally (volleyball) =

Egyptian volleyball player (born 1999)

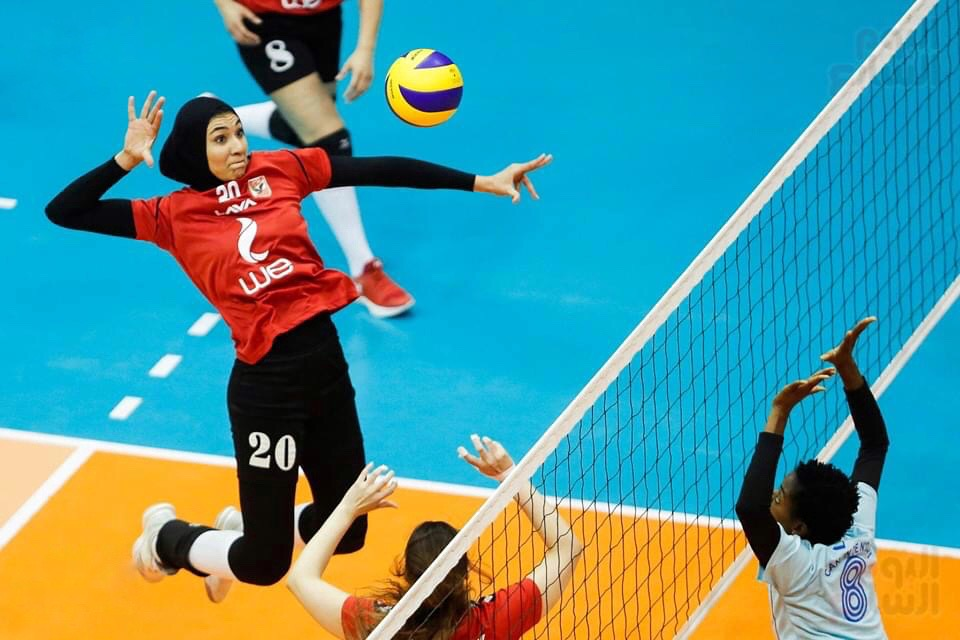
- Mariam Mettwally attacks in the African Club Championship

Personal information
- Full name: Mariam Mohamed Morsy Metwally
- Nationality: Egypt
- Born: 1 May 1999 (age 27); Cairo, Egypt
- Hometown: Cairo
- Height: 187 cm (6 ft 2 in)
- Weight: 83 kg (183 lb)
- Spike: 301 cm (119 in)
- Block: 290 cm (110 in)
- Education: Arab Academy for Science, Technology & Maritime Transport

Volleyball information
- Position: Outside Hitter
- Current club: (Azerbaijan) Momine Khatun
- Number: 4

Career
| Years | Teams |
|---|---|
| 2014-2025 | Al Zamalek |
| 2025-2026 | UYBA Volley |
| 2026-2027 | Momine Khatun |

National team
| 2015 | Egypt |
Medal record
Volleyball
FIVB Nations League
| Bronze medal – third place | 2015 Brazzaville | Team Egypt |
| Silver medal – second place | 2023 Women's African Nations Volleyball Championship | Team Egypt |
| Gold medal – first place | 2026 Women's African Nations Volleyball Championship | Team Egypt |

Mariam Metwally (born May 1, 1999) is an Egyptian female volleyball player, a member of the Egypt women's national volleyball team. She started playing volleyball in Al Ahly Women's Volleyball since she was 7 years old. Mariam joined the Egyptian national team at the age of 16 in 2015 FIVB Volleyball Girls' U18 World Championship in Peru

== Club career ==
Metwally was playing for Al Ahly Volleyball Club since she was 7 years old. She participated for the first time with the senior team of the club in 2015 Women's African Clubs Championship (volleyball) held in Egypt. Al Ahly won in the 1st place and Mariam MVP Honors and Best Blocker.

On 6 August 2025, the Italian club UYBA Volley Busto Arsizio announced the signing of Miriam Metwally.

== Awards ==
=== Individual ===
- Women's African Clubs Championship (volleyball), 2015 Most Valuable Player and Best Blocker
- Women's Arab volleyball clubs championship 2019, Best Blocker
- Women's African Clubs Championship (volleyball), 2017 Most Valuable Player
- 2026 Women's African Nations Volleyball Championship, Best Outside Hitter & Most Valuable Player

=== Clubs ===
- CAVB Championship 2016 – Champion, with Al Ahly
- CAVB Championship 2015 – Champion, with Al Ahly
- Women's Arab volleyball clubs championship 2015 – Champion, with Al Ahly
- Women's Arab volleyball clubs championship 2016 – Champion, with Al Ahly
- CAVB Championship 2018 – Champion, with Al Ahly
- CAVB Championship 2019 – Champion, with Al Ahly
- Women's Arab volleyball clubs championship 2019 – Silver medal, with Al Ahly
