= Zambia women's national volleyball team =

National sports team

Zambia
- Association: Zambia Volleyball Association
- Confederation: CAVB
- FIVB ranking: 113 (2 October 2026)

Uniforms
Home

The Zambia women's national volleyball team represents Zambia in international women's volleyball competitions and friendly matches.

It qualified for the 1995 Women's African Volleyball Championship where it finished 6th.

== Results ==
=== African Championship ===
- (Tunisia) 1995 – 6th place
- (Kenya) 2026 – 12th place

== Beach volleyball ==
Zambia also features a women's national beach volleyball team.
