= Happy Wushilang =

Nigerian volleyball player

Personal information
- Nationality: Nigeria
- Born: May 25, 2002 (age 24)
- Hometown: Bokkos
- Height: 173 cm (5 ft 8 in)
- Weight: 69 kg (152 lb)

Volleyball information
- Position: Outside hitter
- Current club: Plateau Rocks

Happy Wushilang (born May 5, 2002, in Bokkos) is a Nigerian volleyball player who plays as an outside Hitter for Plateau Rocks and Nigeria women's national volleyball team.

== Career history ==
=== Nigeria national team ===
Wushilang was part of the 24 women's volleyball players listed to represent Nigeria in 2021 African women's volleyball championship at Rwanda from 5 September 2021 to 20 September 2021.

She was part of the women's volleyball players that represented Nigeria during the 2023 African Beach Games which was held from 23 to 30 June 2023 at the Yasmine Hammamet resort in Tunisia.

She was part of the volleyball players that Samuel Ajayi listed to represent Nigeria for the 21st African Women's Volleyball Championship which takes place from 14 August to 29 August 2023 in Yaounde, Cameroon.

She was also part of the 13 Nigeria women's volleyball squad that represent Nigeria at the 2023 Association of National Olympic Committees of Africa (ANOCA) Zone III Games which takes place from 4 to 9 December in Lome, Togo.

Wushilang was part of the 12 volleyball players that Samuel Ajayi the head coach of Nigeria women's senior volleyball team listed for African Games Qualifiers in Lagos, Nigeria which takes place on 4 to 8 January 2024.

She was again part of the Nigeria women's national volleyball team squad that represented Nigeria in 13th African Games which takes place from 8 March to 23 March 2024 in Ghana.
