= Yvonne Wavinya =

Kenyan volleyball player

Personal information
- Nationality: Kenyan
- Born: 22 February 1996 (age 30)
- Height: 1.75 m (5 ft 9 in)
- Weight: 63 kg (139 lb)
- Spike: 280 cm (110 in)
- Block: 230 cm (91 in)

Volleyball information
- Position: Wing Spiker
- Current club: Kenya Pipeline

National team
- Years: Team
- –: Kenya

Yvonne Wavinya (born 1996) is a Kenyan volleyball player who plays for Kenya Prisons. She has played for Kenya's U23's and helped qualify Kenya women's national volleyball team for the beach volleyball tournament at the postponed 2020 Summer Olympics in Tokyo, having never participated previously.

== Life ==
Wavinya was born in 1996 in Makueni.

She was in Kenya's national under 23 team in 2017 where she helped them win despite having an injured finger.

Wavinga was in the team that gained Kenya qualification for the postponed 2020 Summer Olympics with Brackcides Agala, Phosca Kasisi and Gaudencia Makokha They qualified when they won at the African Continental Cup Finals in Morocco in 2021. She and Kasisi beat the Nigerian pair of Tochukwu Nnoruga and Albertina Francis 2-0 while Agala and Makokha beat Francisca ‘Franco’ Ikhiede and Amara Uchechukwu 2–1.

Kenya's beach volleyballers were in the four Continental Cup winners with Argentina, Cuba and China (who had already gained Olympic qualification). Kenya has never had a beach volleyball team at the Olympics. The team, chosen by the coach Sammy Mulinge, was drawn into pool D with Brazil, the United States and Latvia at the postponed 2020 Summer Olympics in Tokyo. However, Wavinya was not selected as part of Kenya's two-person beach volleyball pair, which was Gaudencia Makokha and Brackcidise Agala.

Wavinya's partner was Phosca Kasisi. In February 2023 the beach volleyball circuit finished late and well for her and Kasisi. They won the contest in Mombasa beating the favourites of Naomi Too and Gaudencia Makokha. However, in 2023 she formed a new partnership with the Olympian Makokha.

== Clubs ==
- Kenya Prisons
