= 1995 Women's African Volleyball Championship =

The 1995 Women's African Volleyball Championship was the Seventh Edition African continental volleyball Championship for women in Africa and it was held in Nairobi, Kenya, with six teams participated.

== Teams ==
- Angola
- Kenya
- Nigeria
- Mauritius
- Tunisia
- Zambia

== Final ranking ==
Rank	Team
1st place, gold medalist(s)	Kenya
2nd place, silver medalist(s)	Nigeria
3rd place, bronze medalist(s)	Tunisia
4	Angola
5	Mauritius
6	Zambia

1995 Women's African champions

Kenya
Third title
