= Gaudencia Makokha =

Kenyan volleyball player

Personal information
- Nationality: Kenyan
- Born: 15 November 1992 (age 34)
- Height: 1.87 m (6 ft 2 in)
- Weight: 68 kg (150 lb)
- Spike: 310 cm (122 in)
- Block: 300 cm (118 in)

Volleyball information
- Current club: Kenya Pipeline
- Number: 17

National team
- Years: Team
- –: Kenya
Honours
Women's beach volleyball
Representing Kenya
African Games
Silver medal – second place	2019 Rabat	Team
African Beach Games
Bronze medal – third place	2019 Sal	Team

Gaudencia Makokha (born 15 November 1992) is a Kenyan female volleyball player. She was part of the Kenya women's national volleyball team playing beach volleyball at the postponed 2020 Summer Olympics.

== Life ==
She was born in 1992 and her birthplace and residence is Nairobi.

In 2017 she and her then volleyball partner, Naomi Too, reached the FIVB Beach Volleyball World Championships in Vienna, earning $3,400 in prize money.

In 2019 she and Naomi Too won a silver medal at the games at Rabat. She was again in Morocco in 2021 where she played at the African Beach Volleyball Olympic Games qualifiers on 21–28 June.

Too was injured and she could not make the first Olympic trial. Kenya's beach volleyball coach Sammy Mulinge invited Too to the Olympic training although he was concerned by her injury. Too was not included when the volleyball players names for the Olympics were revealed on 26 June 2021. Brackcides Khadambi was called to pair up with Makokha to replace Too. Makokha/ Brackcides Khadambi and Yvonne Wavinya/ Phosca Kasisi make up Kenya's beach volleyball team. They will compete initially with the teams from Brazil, the US and Latvia in pool D. The team were waved off from Kenya by President Uhuru Kenyatta for the Olympics in Tokyo in three batches to try and minimise the chances of being effected by the COVID-19 pandemic. The Kenyan volleyballers stayed in Mombasa for training before flying to Tokyo. Makokha noted that they were the African champions, but the pandemic meant that many of their future opponents had been able to play more matches. Their first match was against Brazil on 26 August. She partnered with Brackcidise Agala at the Olympics in Tokyo.

In 2023 she had a new partner in Yvonne Wavinya and they compete at the African Games in Ghana in 2024. Two years later, her partner was Phoscah Kasisi, and the two of them took part in Kenya Volleyball Federation's National Beach Volleyball Tour winning three of the first four legs.

== Clubs ==
- Kenya Pipeline
