= Catherine Ainembabazi =

Ugandan volleyball player

Personal information
- Full name: Catherine Ainembabazi
- Nationality: Ugandan
- Hometown: , Uganda
- Height: 185 cm (6 ft 1 in)
- Spike: 310 cm (122 in)
- Block: 295 cm (116 in)

Volleyball information
- Position: Receiver-attacker (Outside hitter)
- Current club: Rwanda National Police Women’s Volleyball Club

Catherine Ainembabazi (born August 7, 1999) is a Ugandan Volleyball player who plays as a Receiver-attacker (Outside hitter) for Rwanda National Police Women’s Volleyball Club (Police WVC). Ainembabazi is right hand dominant and in May 2025, was part of the Rwanda National Police squad that secured their first-ever league title by defeating APR.

== Club career ==
Ainembabazi began volleyball at St. Bridget Girls School, Mbarara. She developed at Vision Volleyball Camp under coach Hannington Nsubuga. In 2022, Ainembabazi joined Ndejje Elites before moving to Rwanda National Police Women’s Volleyball Club (Police WVC) in 2023.

== International career ==
CAVB Women’s African Nations Championship (2023), in August 2023, Ainembabazi represented Uganda at the CAVB Women's African Nations Championships in Yaoundé, Cameroon.

CAVB African Club Championship (2022 & 2025), In 2022, she played for Ndejje Elites at the CAVB African Club Championship in Kelibia, Tunisia.

== Awards and honors ==
MVP & Best Attacker at the Taxpayers’ Appreciation Tournament

MVP of the Rwanda Genocide Memorial Tournament in 2023

Gold Medal at the Rwanda Liberation Cup (2023)
