= Bekhta Rabah-Mazari =

Algerian volleyball player (born 1998)

Personal information
- Nationality: Algerian
- Born: 5 May 1998 (age 28)
- Height: 175 cm (69 in)
- Weight: 65 kg (143 lb)
- Spike: 275 cm (108 in)
- Block: 270 cm (106 in)

Volleyball information
- Number: 14 (national team)

Career
Years	Teams
2015	NR Chlef

National team
2015	Algeria

Bekhta Rabah-Mazari (born 5 May 1998) is an Algerian female volleyball player. She is part of the Algeria women's national volleyball team.

She participated in the 2015 FIVB Volleyball World Grand Prix. On club level she played for NR Chlef in 2015.
