= Priscilla Agera =

Nigerian volleyball player (born 1978)

- Born: 8 August 1978 (age 47)
- Occupation: volleyball player 2018 - 2019
- Employer: Nigeria Customs Women Volleyball Team 2020 - 2021

Priscilla Agera is a Nigerian volleyball player who played in the Nigeria Customs Service Women's Team and the Nigeria women's national volleyball team.

== Achievements ==
Priscilla played in Beach volleyball "b" team for the Nigeria women's national volleyball team.

She also served as the coach and captain of the Nigeria Customs Service Women's Team.

She was part of the team that defeated South Africa to claim the gold medal at the 2015 11th All-Africa Games in Congo. She was part of the team that won third place at the African Women Beach Volleyball 2016 Olympics Qualifiers at Jabi Lakeside, Abuja.

She was part of the Nigeria Customs Women's Team that featured in the 2019 Africa Women's Volleyball Club Championship in Cairo, Egypt.

She is the current Technical Director of the Nigeria Paravolley Federation.
