= Albertina Francis =

Nigerian volleyball player

- Born: 16 May 1996 (age 30)
- Occupation: volleyball player

Albertina Francis (born 15 July 1995) is a Nigerian volleyball player who plays in the Nigerian Security and Civil Defense Corps Team and the Nigeria women's national volleyball team.

== Achievements ==
Albertina plays in Beach volleyball "b" team for the Nigeria women's national volleyball team.

She won back to back National Volleyball Premier League titles with Nigerian Security and Civil Defense Corps Team in 2019 and 2021.

Albertina was part of the Nigerian Team selected for the 2018 FIVB Women's World Volleyball World Championship in Ivory Coast alongside Francisca Ikhiede and Priscilla Agera.

She alongside Tochukwu Nnourge, Francisca Ikhiede, Isabella Langu and Amarachi Uchechukwu represented Nigeria at the 2019 FIVB Snow Volleyball World Tour in Bariloche, Rio Negro Argentina. She alongside her teammates beat the Host Argentina in their opening game 2-1 (13-15, 15–11, 15–11).

The Nigerian team were runners up when Kenya qualified for the postponed 2020 Summer Olympics.

She has also featured in the 2016 African Club Championship in Tunisia and the 2018 African Club Championship in Egypt with her club team.
