= Isabella Langu =

Nigerian volleyball player

- Occupation: volleyball player

Isabella Langu is a Nigerian volleyball player who plays in the Nigeria Security and Civil Defence Corps team and the Nigeria women's national volleyball team.

== Achievements ==
Isabella plays in Beach volleyball "b" team for the Nigeria women's national volleyball team.

She was part of the team that defeated South Africa to claim the gold medal at the 2015 11th All-Africa Games in Congo. She was part of the team that won third place at the African Women Beach Volleyball 2016 Olympics Qualifiers at Jabi Lakeside, Abuja.

She was also part of the team to feature in the 2019 World Championship in Doha.

She was part of the team that represented Africa at the 2019 FIVB Snow Volleyball World Tour in Bariloche, Rio Negro Argentina. She alongside her teammates beat the Host Argentina in their opening game 2-1 (13-15, 15–11, 15–11).

She was part of the team that represented Nigeria at the 2019 maiden edition of the World Beach Volleyball Championship in Hamburg, Germany.
