= Burkina Faso women's national volleyball team =

National sports team

Burkina Faso
- Association: Burkina Faso Volleyball Federation
- Confederation: CAVB
- FIVB ranking: NR (24 May 2026)

Uniforms
Home

The Burkina Faso women's national volleyball team represents Burkina Faso in international women's volleyball competitions and friendly matches.

== Results ==
=== African Championship ===
- (Cameroon) 2023 – 10th place
- (Kenya) 2026 – 15th place
