= Naomi Too =

Kenyan volleyball player

Personal information
- Nationality: Kenyan
- Born: 24 April 1992 (age 34); Uasin Gishu, Kenya
- Height: 170 cm (5 ft 7 in)

Volleyball information
- Current club: Kenya Pipeline

Career
Teams
	Kenya Pipeline

National team
Kenya
Honours
Women's beach volleyball
Representing Kenya
African Games
Silver medal – second place	2019 Rabat	Team
African Beach Games
Bronze medal – third place	2019 Sal	Team

Naomi Too (also spelled Naomie, born 24 April 1992) is a Kenyan volleyball player in the Kenya women's national volleyball team.

== Life ==
Too played with the Kenya Pipeline team where she played with Gaudencia Makokha. In 2015 the pair represented Kenya in at the African Games in Rabat, Morocco in beach volleyball. They beat Mozambique and Nigeria to get to the final but were beaten by Egypt, settling for the silver medal. It was the first medal for Kenya at the 2015 games.

In 2017 she and her then volleyball partner, Gaudencia Makokha, won a beach volleyball match and gained $3,400 in prize money.

Too was injured and she could not make the Olympic trials in 2021. Kenya's beach volleyball coach Sammy Mulinge invited Too to the Olympic training although he was concerned by her injury. Too was not included when the volleyball players names for the Olympics were revealed on 26 June 2021. Brackcides Khadambi was called to pair up with Gaudencia Makokha to replace Too and she and Gaudencia Makokha made up Kenya's beach volleyball team in Tokyo.

In 2022 she was paired with Veronica Adhiambo for the Commonwealth Games qualifiers in Accra, Ghana. They took the bronze medal but missed out on a place at the games.

Kenya Pipeline were in Tunisia in May 2023 where they came second to Zamalek from Egypt in the CAVB Women's Volleyball Club Championships. Naomi Too was given the Best Opposite Player award.

In 2023 Too and teammate Gaudencia Makokha were being tipped as the best chance that Kenya had at winning a gold medal at the Paris Olympics. After training at Flamingo Beach Resort in Mombasa in June 2024 the Kenyan coach, Salome Wanjala, chose them to compete in Morocco where the winners would gain an automatic ticket to compete at the Olympics in Paris.

== Clubs ==
- Kenya Pipeline
