= Amarachi Uchechukwu =

Nigerian volleyball player

- Born: 2 February 2001 (age 25)
- Occupation: volleyball player

Amarachi Uchechukwu (born 2 February 2001) is a Nigerian volleyball player who plays in the Nigeria Customs team and the Nigeria women's national volleyball team.

== Achievements ==
Amarachi plays in Beach volleyball "b" team for the Nigeria women's national volleyball team.

She was part of the team that was selected for the 2019 CAVB U21 Beach cup zonal qualifiers in Accra, Ghana.

She was also part of the team to feature in the 2019 World Championship in Doha.

She was part of the team that represented Africa at the 2019 FIVB Snow Volleyball World Tour in Bariloche, Rio Negro Argentina. She alongside her teammates beat the Host Argentina in their opening game 2-1 (13-15, 15–11, 15–11).

She was part of the team that represented Nigeria at the 2019 maiden edition of the World Beach Volleyball Championship in Hamburg, Germany.

The Nigerian team were runners up when Kenya qualified for the postponed 2020 Summer Olympics.
