= Kenya Pipeline F.C. =

Kenyan football club

Kenya Pipeline
- Full name: Kenya Pipeline Nairobi Football Club
- Ground: Nairobi City Stadium
- Capacity: 20,000
- Chairman: John Ngumi Kenya Pipeline Company

Kenya Pipeline was an association football club based in Nairobi, Kenya. In 2002 the team won the Kenyan Cup.

Kenya Pipeline were promoted to the Kenyan Premier League in the 2001 season.

Boniface Ambani won the golden boot while playing for Pipeline in 2005.

The club played in the top flight from 2002 to 2005, when they disbanded.

Kenya Pipeline were in Tunisia in May 2023 where they came second to Zamalek from Egypt in the CAVB Women's Volleyball Club Championships. The team's Naomi Too was given the Best Opposite Player award.

== Stadium ==
The team played at the 20,000-seat Nairobi City Stadium.

== Performance in Caf competitions ==
- 2003 African Cup Winners' Cup: Second round

== Honours ==
- Kenyan Cup
  - Winners (1): 2002
