= Uganda women's national volleyball team =

National sports team

Uganda
- Association: Uganda Volleyball Federation
- Confederation: CAVB
- FIVB ranking: NR (24 May 2026)

Uniforms
Home

The Uganda women's national volleyball team represents Uganda in international women's volleyball competitions and friendly matches.

== Results ==
=== African Championship ===
- (Cameroon) 2023 – 8th place
- (Kenya) 2026 – 8th place
