= Rwanda women's national volleyball team =

National sports team

Rwanda
- Association: Rwanda Volleyball Federation
- Confederation: CAVB
- FIVB ranking: NR (24 May 2026)

Uniforms
Home

The Rwanda women's national volleyball team represents Rwanda in international women's volleyball competitions and friendly matches.

The team qualified for the 2001, 2007 and 2021 events of the Women's African Volleyball Championship.

In 2008 the team, it was reported, tried to recruit Kenyan coach Paul Bitok to be their national coach, but he turned down the offer to go to Budapest to learn more about sports coaching. Bitok then returned to Rwanda where he introduced training from an early age. Camps were established in the provinces where young players could be developed. When he left in 2020 Rwanda had teams competing internationally in every age category and the national team were the champions of Africa.

As of 2021, the team's head coach has been Paulo de Tarso.

== Results ==
=== African Championship ===
- (Cameroon) 2023 – 4th place
- (Kenya) 2026 – 4th place
