= 2023 Women's African Nations Volleyball Championship =

African women's volleyball championships

2023 Women's African Nations Championship

Tournament details
- Host country: Cameroon
- City: Yaoundé
- Dates: 16–24 August
- Teams: 12 (from 1 confederation)
- Venues: 2 (in 1 host city)

Final positions
- Champions: Kenya (10th title)
- Runners-up: Egypt
- Third place: Cameroon
- Fourth place: Rwanda

Tournament awards
- MVP: (Kenya) Sharon Chepchumba

The 2023 Women's African Nations Volleyball Championship was the 21st edition of the Women's African Volleyball Championship, a biennial international volleyball tournament organised by the African Volleyball Confederation (CAVB). The tournament was held in Yaoundé, Cameroon from 16 to 24 August 2023. The top three teams of the tournament qualified for the 2025 FIVB Volleyball Women's World Championship as the CAVB representatives.

== Pools composition ==
CAVB announced the pool composition on 16 August 2023.

Pool A	Pool B
Cameroon	Kenya
Nigeria	Morocco
Burundi	Rwanda
Mali	Uganda
Algeria	Burkina Faso
Egypt	Lesotho

== Pool standing procedure ==
1. Number of matches won
2. Match points
3. Sets ratio
4. Points ratio
5. Result of the last match between the tied teams

Match won 3–0 or 3–1: 3 match points for the winner, 0 match points for the loser
Match won 3–2: 2 match points for the winner, 1 match point for the loser.

== Group stage ==
- All times are West Africa Time (UTC+01:00).

=== Pool A ===
Pos	Team	Pld	W	L	Pts	SW	SL	SR	SPW	SPL	SPR	Qualification
1	Egypt	5	5	0	15	15	1	15.000	396	224	1.768	Quarterfinals
2	Cameroon (H)	5	4	1	12	13	3	4.333	381	264	1.443	Quarterfinals
3	Algeria	5	3	2	8	9	8	1.125	382	305	1.252	Quarterfinals
4	Nigeria	5	2	3	7	8	9	0.889	340	354	0.960	Quarterfinals
5	Mali	5	1	4	3	3	12	0.250	212	360	0.589	9th–12th semifinals
6	Burundi	5	0	5	0	0	15	0.000	171	375	0.456	9th–12th semifinals

Source: FIVB
(H) Host

Date	Time		Score		Set 1	Set 2	Set 3	Set 4	Set 5	Total	Report
16 Aug	11:00	Nigeria	3–0	Mali	25–18	25–14	25–20			75–52	Report
16 Aug	14:00	Egypt	3–0	Algeria	25–18	25–13	25–22			75–53	Report
16 Aug	18:00	Cameroon	3–0	Burundi	25–2	25–8	25–12			75–22	Report
17 Aug	11:00	Mali	0–3	Egypt	10–25	9–25	6–25			25–75	Report
17 Aug	13:00	Burundi	0–3	Algeria	6–25	13–25	11–25			30–75	Report
17 Aug	18:00	Cameroon	3–0	Nigeria	25–17	25–13	25–18			75–48	Report
18 Aug	12:00	Nigeria	3–0	Burundi	25–17	25–14	25–9			75–40	Report
18 Aug	16:00	Algeria	3–0	Mali	25–10	25–7	25–12			75–29	Report
18 Aug	18:00	Egypt	3–1	Cameroon	25–16	25–19	21–25	25–16		96–76	Report
19 Aug	12:00	Mali	3–0	Burundi	25–19	25–21	25–20			75–60	Report
19 Aug	13:00	Nigeria	0–3	Egypt	14–25	17–25	20–25			51–75	Report
19 Aug	18:00	Cameroon	3–0	Algeria	25–21	30–28	25–18			80–67	Report
20 Aug	13:00	Algeria	3–2	Nigeria	25–16	25–18	23–25	24–26	15–6	112–91	Report
20 Aug	14:00	Burundi	0–3	Egypt	2–25	4–25	13–25			19–75	Report
20 Aug	18:00	Mali	0–3	Cameroon	9–25	11–25	11–25			31–75	Report

=== Pool B ===
Pos	Team	Pld	W	L	Pts	SW	SL	SR	SPW	SPL	SPR	Qualification
1	Kenya	5	5	0	15	15	1	15.000	397	230	1.726	Quarterfinals
2	Rwanda	5	3	2	10	11	6	1.833	381	293	1.300	Quarterfinals
3	Morocco	5	3	2	9	12	8	1.500	432	376	1.149	Quarterfinals
4	Uganda	5	3	2	8	9	8	1.125	360	314	1.146	Quarterfinals
5	Burkina Faso	5	1	4	3	3	12	0.250	213	354	0.602	9th–12th semifinals
6	Lesotho	5	0	5	0	0	15	0.000	159	375	0.424	9th–12th semifinals

Source: FIVB

Date	Time		Score		Set 1	Set 2	Set 3	Set 4	Set 5	Total	Report
16 Aug	09:00	Morocco	3–0	Burkina Faso	25–18	25–11	25–7			75–36	Report
16 Aug	12:00	Kenya	3–0	Rwanda	25–16	25–20	25–17			75–53	Report
16 Aug	13:00	Uganda	3–0	Lesotho	25–10	25–5	25–10			75–25	Report
17 Aug	12:00	Lesotho	0–3	Rwanda	4–25	11–25	7–25			22–75	Report
17 Aug	14:00	Burkina Faso	0–3	Kenya	10–25	9–25	10–25			29–75	Report
17 Aug	16:00	Uganda	3–2	Morocco	25–15	26–28	17–25	25–16	15–11	108–95	Report
18 Aug	11:00	Rwanda	3–0	Burkina Faso	25–8	25–7	25–14			75–29	Report
18 Aug	12:00	Kenya	3–0	Uganda	25–14	25–16	25–14			75–44	Report
18 Aug	14:00	Morocco	3–0	Lesotho	25–10	25–11	25–11			75–32	Report
19 Aug	11:00	Lesotho	0–3	Burkina Faso	17–25	18–25	19–25			54–75	Report
19 Aug	14:00	Uganda	0–3	Rwanda	20–25	17–25	21–25			58–75	Report
19 Aug	16:00	Morocco	1–3	Kenya	16–25	23–25	25–22	14–25		78–97	Report
20 Aug	11:00	Rwanda	2–3	Morocco	18–25	25–19	25–22	26–28	9–15	103–109	Report
20 Aug	12:00	Burkina Faso	0–3	Uganda	14–25	12–25	18–25			44–75	Report
20 Aug	16:00	Kenya	3–0	Lesotho	25–5	25–8	25–13			75–26	Report

== Final round ==
- All times are West Africa Time (UTC+01:00).

=== 9th–12th places ===
9th–12th semifinals
22 August
Mali	3
Lesotho	0
22 August
Burkina Faso	3
Burundi	0

9th place match
23 August
Mali	3
Burkina Faso	0
11th place match
23 August
Lesotho	1
Burundi	3

==== 9th–12th semifinals ====
Date	Time		Score		Set 1	Set 2	Set 3	Set 4	Set 5	Total	Report
22 Aug	11:00	Mali	3–0	Lesotho	25–13	25–16	25–19			75–48	Report
22 Aug	13:00	Burkina Faso	3–0	Burundi	25–16	25–16	25–19			75–51	Report

==== 11th place match ====
Date	Time		Score		Set 1	Set 2	Set 3	Set 4	Set 5	Total	Report
23 Aug	08:00	Lesotho	1–3	Burundi	13–25	25–21	15–25	20–25		73–96	Report

==== 9th place match ====
Date	Time		Score		Set 1	Set 2	Set 3	Set 4	Set 5	Total	Report
23 Aug	10:00	Mali	3–0	Burkina Faso	25–18	25–18	25–22			75–58	Report

=== Final eight ===
Quarterfinals
22 August
Egypt	3
Uganda	0
22 August
Rwanda	3
Algeria	2
22 August
Kenya	3
Nigeria	0
22 August
Cameroon	3
Morocco	0

Semifinals
23 August
Egypt	3
Rwanda	0
23 August
Kenya	3
Cameroon	1

Final
24 August
Egypt	0
Kenya	3
3rd place match
24 August
Rwanda	1
Cameroon	3

5th–8th semifinals
23 August
Uganda	0
Algeria	3
23 August
Nigeria	3
Morocco	0

5th place match
24 August
Algeria	3
Nigeria	1
7th place match
24 August
Uganda	1
Morocco	3

==== Quarterfinals ====
Date	Time		Score		Set 1	Set 2	Set 3	Set 4	Set 5	Total	Report
22 Aug	12:00	Egypt	3–0	Uganda	25–13	25–18	25–11			75–42	Report
22 Aug	14:00	Rwanda	3–2	Algeria	23–25	15–25	25–18	25–23	16–14	104–105	Report
22 Aug	16:00	Kenya	3–0	Nigeria	25–14	25–17	25–11			75–42	Report
22 Aug	18:00	Cameroon	3–0	Morocco	25–17	25–23	25–18			75–58	Report

==== 5th–8th semifinals ====
Date	Time		Score		Set 1	Set 2	Set 3	Set 4	Set 5	Total	Report
23 Aug	12:00	Uganda	0–3	Algeria	20–25	23–25	17–25			60–75	Report
23 Aug	14:00	Nigeria	3–0	Morocco	26–24	25–21	29–27			80–72	Report

==== Semifinals ====
Date	Time		Score		Set 1	Set 2	Set 3	Set 4	Set 5	Total	Report
23 Aug	16:00	Egypt	3–0	Rwanda	25–14	25–11	25–10			75–35	Report
23 Aug	18:00	Kenya	3–1	Cameroon	25–27	25–14	25–11	25–18		100–70	Report

==== 7th place match ====
Date	Time		Score		Set 1	Set 2	Set 3	Set 4	Set 5	Total	Report
24 Aug	08:00	Uganda	1–3	Morocco	24–26	25–27	26–24	22–25		97–102	Report

==== 5th place match ====
Date	Time		Score		Set 1	Set 2	Set 3	Set 4	Set 5	Total	Report
24 Aug	10:00	Algeria	3–1	Nigeria	25–18	25–13	23–25	25–17		98–73	Report

==== 3rd place match ====
Date	Time		Score		Set 1	Set 2	Set 3	Set 4	Set 5	Total	Report
24 Aug	14:00	Rwanda	1–3	Cameroon	25–21	15–25	14–25	15–25		69–96	Report

==== Final ====
Date	Time		Score		Set 1	Set 2	Set 3	Set 4	Set 5	Total	Report
24 Aug	18:00	Egypt	0–3	Kenya	22–25	20–25	14–25			56–75	Report

== Final standing ==
Rank	Team
1st place, gold medalist(s)	Kenya
2nd place, silver medalist(s)	Egypt
3rd place, bronze medalist(s)	Cameroon
4	Rwanda
5	Algeria
6	Nigeria
7	Morocco
8	Uganda
9	Mali
10	Burkina Faso
11	Burundi
12	Lesotho

Qualified for the 2025 World Championship

2023 Women's African Nations champions

Kenya
10th title

== See also ==
- 2023 Men's African Nations Volleyball Championship
