= Nigeria women's national volleyball team =

National sports team

Nigeria
- Association: Nigeria Volleyball Federation
- Confederation: CAVB
- FIVB ranking: NR (24 May 2026)

Uniforms
Home

The Nigeria women's national volleyball team represents Nigeria in international women's volleyball competitions and friendly matches.

Nigeria lastly qualified for the 2021 Women's African Nations Volleyball Championship where the team reached the semifinals.

== Results ==
=== African Championship ===
- (Rwanda) 2021 – 4th place
- (Cameroon) 2023 – 6th place
- (Kenya) 2026 – 9th place

== Beach volleyball ==
Nigeria also features a women's national beach volleyball team. At the beginning of 2019 the team was in Yaoundé in Cameroon where Francisca Ikhiede and Tochukwu Nnourge won the gold medal at the Camtel International Beach Volleyball Championship. They won the final match despite the cheers of the crowd as their opposition was the Cameroon team.

The Nigerian team were runners up when Kenya qualified for the postponed 2020 Summer Olympics. Only four African countries have sent teams to the Olympics.

The Nigerian national team lost at the African Continental Cup Finals in Morocco in 2021. The Kenya team of Yvonne Wavinya and Phosca Kasisi beat Tochukwu Nnourge and Albertina Francis 2-0 while Brackcides Agala, and Gaudencia Makokha beat the other Nigerian pair of Francisca Ikhiede and Amarachi Uchechukwu 2–1.
