= Volleyball at the 2016 Summer Olympics – Women's team rosters =

This article shows the rosters of all participating teams at the women's indoor volleyball tournament at the 2016 Summer Olympics in Rio de Janeiro.

== Pool A ==
=== Argentina ===
The following is the Argentine roster in the women's volleyball tournament of the 2016 Summer Olympics.

Head coach: Guillermo Orduna

No.	Name	Date of birth	Height	Weight	Spike	Block	2015–16 club
2	Tanya Acosta	11 March 1991	1.82 m (6 ft 0 in)	70 kg (150 lb)	287 cm (113 in)	280 cm (110 in)	(Argentina) Gimnasia y Esgrima (LP)
3	Yamila Nizetich (c)	27 January 1989	1.81 m (5 ft 11 in)	74 kg (163 lb)	305 cm (120 in)	295 cm (116 in)	(Turkey) Nilufer
5	Lucía Fresco	14 May 1991	1.95 m (6 ft 5 in)	92 kg (203 lb)	304 cm (120 in)	290 cm (110 in)	(Italy) Robur Tiboni Urbino Volley
9	Clarisa Sagardía	29 June 1989	1.74 m (5 ft 9 in)	67 kg (148 lb)	290 cm (110 in)	280 cm (110 in)	(Argentina) Boca Juniors
10	Emilce Sosa	11 September 1987	1.77 m (5 ft 10 in)	75 kg (165 lb)	305 cm (120 in)	295 cm (116 in)	(Brazil) Esporte Clube Pinheiros
11	Julieta Lazcano	25 July 1989	1.90 m (6 ft 3 in)	74 kg (163 lb)	312 cm (123 in)	293 cm (115 in)	(France) Istres Volley-Ball
12	Tatiana Rizzo (L)	30 December 1986	1.78 m (5 ft 10 in)	64 kg (141 lb)	280 cm (110 in)	268 cm (106 in)	(Argentina) Boca Juniors
13	Leticia Boscacci	8 November 1985	1.86 m (6 ft 1 in)	70 kg (150 lb)	302 cm (119 in)	284 cm (112 in)	(Switzerland) VC Kanti Schaffhausen
14	Josefina Fernández	17 August 1991	1.75 m (5 ft 9 in)	72 kg (159 lb)	294 cm (116 in)	284 cm (112 in)	(Switzerland) Hotel VFM
16	Florencia Busquets	27 June 1989	1.92 m (6 ft 4 in)	68 kg (150 lb)	305 cm (120 in)	290 cm (110 in)	(Switzerland) Hotel VFM
18	Yael Castiglione	27 September 1985	1.84 m (6 ft 0 in)	75 kg (165 lb)	295 cm (116 in)	281 cm (111 in)	(Brazil) Rio do Sul
19	Morena Franchi	19 February 1993	1.64 m (5 ft 5 in)	62 kg (137 lb)	285 cm (112 in)	264 cm (104 in)	(Argentina) Vélez Sarsfield

=== Brazil ===
The following is the Brazilian roster in the women's volleyball tournament of the 2016 Summer Olympics.

Head coach: José Roberto Guimarães

No.	Name	Date of birth	Height	Weight	Spike	Block	2015–16 club
1	Fabiana Claudino (c)	24 January 1985	1.94 m (6 ft 4 in)	76 kg (168 lb)	314 cm (124 in)	293 cm (115 in)	(Brazil) SESI São Paulo
2	Juciely Cristina Barreto	18 December 1980	1.84 m (6 ft 0 in)	71 kg (157 lb)	312 cm (123 in)	289 cm (114 in)	(Brazil) Rio de Janeiro VC
3	Dani Lins	5 January 1985	1.84 m (6 ft 0 in)	68 kg (150 lb)	290 cm (110 in)	276 cm (109 in)	(Brazil) Osasco VC
5	Adenízia da Silva	18 December 1986	1.86 m (6 ft 1 in)	63 kg (139 lb)	312 cm (123 in)	290 cm (110 in)	(Brazil) Osasco VC
6	Thaísa Menezes	15 May 1987	1.96 m (6 ft 5 in)	79 kg (174 lb)	316 cm (124 in)	301 cm (119 in)	(Brazil) Osasco VC
8	Jaqueline Carvalho	31 December 1986	1.87 m (6 ft 2 in)	70 kg (150 lb)	302 cm (119 in)	286 cm (113 in)	(Brazil) Minas Tênis Clube
10	Gabriela Guimarães	19 May 1994	1.80 m (5 ft 11 in)	59 kg (130 lb)	295 cm (116 in)	274 cm (108 in)	(Brazil) Rio de Janeiro VC
12	Natália Pereira	4 April 1989	1.86 m (6 ft 1 in)	76 kg (168 lb)	300 cm (120 in)	288 cm (113 in)	(Brazil) Rio de Janeiro VC
13	Sheilla Castro	1 July 1983	1.86 m (6 ft 1 in)	64 kg (141 lb)	302 cm (119 in)	284 cm (112 in)	(Turkey) VakifBank Istanbul
16	Fernanda Garay	10 May 1986	1.81 m (5 ft 11 in)	74 kg (163 lb)	308 cm (121 in)	288 cm (113 in)	(Russia) Dinamo Moscow
17	Fabíola de Souza	3 February 1983	1.84 m (6 ft 0 in)	70 kg (150 lb)	300 cm (120 in)	285 cm (112 in)	(Switzerland) Voléro Zürich
19	Léia Silva (L)	3 January 1985	1.70 m (5 ft 7 in)	60 kg (130 lb)	268 cm (106 in)	254 cm (100 in)	(Brazil) Minas TC

=== Cameroon ===
The following was the Cameroonian roster in the women's volleyball tournament of the 2016 Summer Olympics.

Head coach: Jean-René Akono

No.	Name	Date of birth	Height	Weight	Spike	Block	2015–16 club
1	Stéphanie Fotso Mogoung	25 September 1987	1.84 m (6 ft 0 in)	78 kg (172 lb)	296 cm (117 in)	259 cm (102 in)	(France) VBC Chamalières
2	Christelle Tchoudjang (c)	7 July 1989	1.84 m (6 ft 0 in)	80 kg (180 lb)	295 cm (116 in)	260 cm (100 in)	(France) VBC Chamalières
4	Raïssa Nasser (L)	19 August 1994	1.73 m (5 ft 8 in)	73 kg (161 lb)	270 cm (110 in)	265 cm (104 in)	(France) La Rochelle
5	Théorine Aboa Mbeza	25 August 1992	1.82 m (6 ft 0 in)	78 kg (172 lb)	285 cm (112 in)	270 cm (110 in)	(Cameroon) FAP Yaoundé
6	Laetitia Moma Bassoko	9 October 1993	1.84 m (6 ft 0 in)	81 kg (179 lb)	312 cm (123 in)	287 cm (113 in)	(France) VBC Chamalières
7	Henriette Koulla	14 September 1992	1.69 m (5 ft 7 in)	67 kg (148 lb)	275 cm (108 in)	250 cm (98 in)	(France) Tremblay AC
10	Berthrade Bikatal	23 July 1992	1.83 m (6 ft 0 in)	76 kg (168 lb)	297 cm (117 in)	253 cm (100 in)	(Cameroon) Nyong-et-Kéllé
11	Victoire L'or Ngon Ntame	31 December 1985	1.77 m (5 ft 10 in)	79 kg (174 lb)	288 cm (113 in)	253 cm (100 in)	(Cameroon) INJS Yaoundé
12	Fawziya Abdoulkarim	1 March 1989	1.80 m (5 ft 11 in)	67 kg (148 lb)	292 cm (115 in)	259 cm (102 in)	(Cameroon) Bafia Evolution
13	Madeleine Bodo Essissima	29 April 1992	1.82 m (6 ft 0 in)	75 kg (165 lb)	275 cm (108 in)	270 cm (110 in)	(Cameroon) FAP Yaoundé
14	Yolande Amana Guigolo	15 September 1997	1.84 m (6 ft 0 in)	78 kg (172 lb)	275 cm (108 in)	270 cm (110 in)	(Cameroon) Bafia Evolution
15	Emelda Piata Zessi	8 April 1997	1.90 m (6 ft 3 in)	65 kg (143 lb)	275 cm (108 in)	270 cm (110 in)	(Cameroon) Bafia Evolution

=== Japan ===
The following is the Japanese roster in the women's volleyball tournament of the 2016 Summer Olympics.

Head coach: Masayoshi Manabe

No.	Name	Date of birth	Height	Weight	Spike	Block	2015–16 club
1	Miyu Nagaoka	25 July 1991	1.79 m (5 ft 10 in)	68 kg (150 lb)	310 cm (120 in)	298 cm (117 in)	(Japan) Hisamitsu Springs
2	Haruka Miyashita	1 September 1994	1.77 m (5 ft 10 in)	61 kg (134 lb)	298 cm (117 in)	272 cm (107 in)	(Japan) Okayama Seagulls
3	Saori Kimura (c)	19 August 1986	1.85 m (6 ft 1 in)	65 kg (143 lb)	304 cm (120 in)	293 cm (115 in)	(Japan) Toray Arrows
5	Arisa Satō (L)	18 July 1989	1.64 m (5 ft 5 in)	52 kg (115 lb)	275 cm (108 in)	266 cm (105 in)	(Japan) Hitachi Rivale
6	Yurie Nabeya	15 December 1993	1.76 m (5 ft 9 in)	58 kg (128 lb)	302 cm (119 in)	285 cm (112 in)	(Japan) Denso Airybees
7	Mai Yamaguchi	3 July 1983	1.76 m (5 ft 9 in)	62 kg (137 lb)	304 cm (120 in)	292 cm (115 in)	(Japan) Okayama Seagulls
9	Haruyo Shimamura	4 March 1992	1.82 m (6 ft 0 in)	79 kg (174 lb)	299 cm (118 in)	290 cm (110 in)	(Japan) NEC Red Rockets
11	Erika Araki	3 August 1984	1.86 m (6 ft 1 in)	78 kg (172 lb)	304 cm (120 in)	301 cm (119 in)	(Japan) Toyota Queenseis
12	Yuki Ishii	8 May 1991	1.80 m (5 ft 11 in)	68 kg (150 lb)	302 cm (119 in)	286 cm (113 in)	(Japan) Hisamitsu Springs
16	Saori Sakoda	18 December 1987	1.75 m (5 ft 9 in)	63 kg (139 lb)	305 cm (120 in)	279 cm (110 in)	(Japan) Toray Arrows
18	Kotoki Zayasu	11 January 1990	1.59 m (5 ft 3 in)	57 kg (126 lb)	270 cm (110 in)	255 cm (100 in)	(Japan) Hisamitsu Springs
20	Kanami Tashiro	25 March 1991	1.73 m (5 ft 8 in)	66 kg (146 lb)	283 cm (111 in)	273 cm (107 in)	(Japan) Toray Arrows

=== Russia ===
The following is the Russian roster in the women's volleyball tournament of the 2016 Summer Olympics.

Head coach: Yuri Marichev

No.	Name	Date of birth	Height	Weight	Spike	Block	2015–16 club
1	Yana Shcherban	6 September 1989	1.86 m (6 ft 1 in)	71 kg (157 lb)	298 cm (117 in)	294 cm (116 in)	(Russia) Dynamo Moscow
3	Elena Ezhova	14 August 1977	1.78 m (5 ft 10 in)	69 kg (152 lb)	288 cm (113 in)	282 cm (111 in)	(Russia) Dynamo Kazan
4	Irina Zaryazhko	4 October 1991	1.96 m (6 ft 5 in)	78 kg (172 lb)	305 cm (120 in)	290 cm (110 in)	(Russia) Uralochka Ekaterinburg
6	Daria Malygina	4 April 1994	1.98 m (6 ft 6 in)	82 kg (181 lb)	317 cm (125 in)	305 cm (120 in)	(Russia) Zarechie Odintsovo
8	Nataliya Goncharova	1 June 1989	1.95 m (6 ft 5 in)	75 kg (165 lb)	315 cm (124 in)	306 cm (120 in)	(Russia) Dynamo Moscow
9	Vera Ulyakina	21 August 1986	1.81 m (5 ft 11 in)	73 kg (161 lb)	298 cm (117 in)	293 cm (115 in)	(Russia) Dynamo Moscow
10	Ekaterina Kosianenko (c)	2 February 1990	1.76 m (5 ft 9 in)	64 kg (141 lb)	290 cm (110 in)	285 cm (112 in)	(Russia) Dynamo Moscow
14	Irina Fetisova	7 September 1994	1.89 m (6 ft 2 in)	76 kg (168 lb)	307 cm (121 in)	286 cm (113 in)	(Russia) Dynamo Moscow
15	Tatiana Kosheleva	23 December 1988	1.91 m (6 ft 3 in)	67 kg (148 lb)	315 cm (124 in)	305 cm (120 in)	(Russia) Dinamo Krasnodar
16	Irina Voronkova	20 October 1995	1.90 m (6 ft 3 in)	84 kg (185 lb)	305 cm (120 in)	290 cm (110 in)	(Russia) Zarechie Odintsovo
19	Anna Malova (L)	16 April 1990	1.75 m (5 ft 9 in)	59 kg (130 lb)	286 cm (113 in)	290 cm (110 in)	(Russia) Dynamo Moscow
20	Anastasia Shlyakhovaya	5 October 1990	1.92 m (6 ft 4 in)	69 kg (152 lb)	313 cm (123 in)	307 cm (121 in)	(Russia) Dinamo Krasnodar

=== South Korea ===
The following is the South Korean roster in the women's volleyball tournament of the 2016 Summer Olympics.

Head coach: Lee Jung-chul

No.	Name	Date of birth	Height	Weight	Spike	Block	2015–16 club
3	Lee Hyo-hee (S)	9 September 1980	1.73 m (5 ft 8 in)	57 kg (126 lb)	280 cm (110 in)	271 cm (107 in)	(South Korea) Korea Expressway Corp.
4	Kim Hee-jin (OP)	29 April 1991	1.85 m (6 ft 1 in)	75 kg (165 lb)	300 cm (120 in)	295 cm (116 in)	(South Korea) IBK Altos
5	Kim Hae-ran (L)	16 March 1984	1.68 m (5 ft 6 in)	57 kg (126 lb)	280 cm (110 in)	270 cm (110 in)	(South Korea) Korea Ginseng Corp.
6	Hwang Youn-joo (OP)	13 August 1986	1.77 m (5 ft 10 in)	64 kg (141 lb)	285 cm (112 in)	265 cm (104 in)	(South Korea) Hyundai E&C
7	Lee Jae-yeong (OH)	15 October 1996	1.79 m (5 ft 10 in)	63 kg (139 lb)	286 cm (113 in)	267 cm (105 in)	(South Korea) Heungkuk Life Insurance
8	Nam Jie-youn (OH)	15 May 1983	1.70 m (5 ft 7 in)	61 kg (134 lb)	285 cm (112 in)	273 cm (107 in)	(South Korea) IBK Altos
10	Kim Yeon-koung (c) (OH)	26 February 1988	1.92 m (6 ft 4 in)	73 kg (161 lb)	350 cm (140 in)	340 cm (130 in)	(Turkey) Fenerbahçe
11	Kim Su-ji (MB)	11 July 1987	1.86 m (6 ft 1 in)	68 kg (150 lb)	335 cm (132 in)	320 cm (130 in)	(South Korea) Heungkuk Life Insurance
13	Park Jeong-ah (OH)	26 March 1993	1.87 m (6 ft 2 in)	73 kg (161 lb)	300 cm (120 in)	290 cm (110 in)	(South Korea) IBK Altos
14	Yang Hyo-jin (MB)	14 December 1989	1.90 m (6 ft 3 in)	72 kg (159 lb)	340 cm (130 in)	338 cm (133 in)	(South Korea) Hyundai E&C
16	Bae Yoo-na (MB/OP)	30 November 1989	1.82 m (6 ft 0 in)	66 kg (146 lb)	288 cm (113 in)	280 cm (110 in)	(South Korea) Korea Expressway Corp.
17	Yeum Hye-seon (S)	3 February 1991	1.77 m (5 ft 10 in)	65 kg (143 lb)	278 cm (109 in)	263 cm (104 in)	(South Korea) Hyundai E&C

== Pool B ==
=== China ===
The following is the Chinese roster in the women's volleyball tournament of the 2016 Summer Olympics.

Head coach: Lang Ping

No.	Name	Date of birth	Height	Weight	Spike	Block	2016–17 club
1	Yuan Xinyue	21 December 1996	2.01 m (6 ft 7 in)	78 kg (172 lb)	317 cm (125 in)	311 cm (122 in)	(China) Bayi
2	Zhu Ting	29 November 1994	1.98 m (6 ft 6 in)	78 kg (172 lb)	327 cm (129 in)	300 cm (120 in)	(Turkey) VakıfBank
3	Yang Fangxu	6 October 1994	1.90 m (6 ft 3 in)	71 kg (157 lb)	308 cm (121 in)	300 cm (120 in)	(China) Shandong
6	Gong Xiangyu	21 April 1997	1.86 m (6 ft 1 in)	72 kg (159 lb)	313 cm (123 in)	302 cm (119 in)	(China) Jiangsu
7	Wei Qiuyue	26 September 1988	1.84 m (6 ft 0 in)	65 kg (143 lb)	305 cm (120 in)	300 cm (120 in)	(China) Tianjin
9	Zhang Changning	6 November 1995	1.93 m (6 ft 4 in)	80 kg (180 lb)	315 cm (124 in)	303 cm (119 in)	(China) Jiangsu
10	Liu Xiaotong	16 February 1990	1.88 m (6 ft 2 in)	70 kg (150 lb)	312 cm (123 in)	300 cm (120 in)	(China) Beijing
11	Xu Yunli	2 August 1987	1.96 m (6 ft 5 in)	75 kg (165 lb)	325 cm (128 in)	306 cm (120 in)	(China) Fujian
12	Hui Ruoqi (c)	4 March 1991	1.92 m (6 ft 4 in)	72 kg (159 lb)	315 cm (124 in)	305 cm (120 in)	(China) Jiangsu
15	Lin Li (L)	5 July 1992	1.71 m (5 ft 7 in)	65 kg (143 lb)	294 cm (116 in)	294 cm (116 in)	(China) Fujian
16	Ding Xia	13 January 1990	1.80 m (5 ft 11 in)	61 kg (134 lb)	305 cm (120 in)	300 cm (120 in)	(China) Liaoning
17	Yan Ni	2 March 1987	1.92 m (6 ft 4 in)	74 kg (163 lb)	317 cm (125 in)	306 cm (120 in)	(China) Liaoning

=== Italy ===
The following is the Italian roster in the women's volleyball tournament of the 2016 Summer Olympics.

Head coach: Marco Bonitta

No.	Name	Date of birth	Height	Weight	Spike	Block	2015–16 club
1	Serena Ortolani	7 January 1987	1.86 m (6 ft 1 in)	63 kg (139 lb)	315 cm (124 in)	310 cm (120 in)	(Italy) Imoco Volley
4	Alessia Orro	18 July 1998	1.78 m (5 ft 10 in)	74 kg (163 lb)	308 cm (121 in)	302 cm (119 in)	(Italy) Club Italia
6	Monica De Gennaro (L)	8 January 1987	1.74 m (5 ft 9 in)	67 kg (148 lb)	270 cm (110 in)	265 cm (104 in)	(Italy) Imoco Volley
7	Martina Guiggi	1 May 1984	1.86 m (6 ft 1 in)	80 kg (180 lb)	317 cm (125 in)	312 cm (123 in)	(Italy) AGIL Novara
8	Alessia Gennari	3 November 1991	1.83 m (6 ft 0 in)	68 kg (150 lb)	305 cm (120 in)	238 cm (94 in)	(Italy) Foppapedretti Bergamo
9	Nadia Centoni	19 June 1981	1.84 m (6 ft 0 in)	63 kg (139 lb)	315 cm (124 in)	311 cm (122 in)	(Turkey) Galatasaray S.K.
11	Cristina Chirichella	10 February 1994	1.95 m (6 ft 5 in)	73 kg (161 lb)	320 cm (130 in)	315 cm (124 in)	(Italy) AGIL Novara
14	Eleonora Lo Bianco	22 December 1979	1.71 m (5 ft 7 in)	67 kg (148 lb)	300 cm (120 in)	295 cm (116 in)	(Turkey) Galatasaray S.K.
15	Antonella Del Core (c)	5 November 1980	1.83 m (6 ft 0 in)	75 kg (165 lb)	310 cm (120 in)	305 cm (120 in)	(Russia) Dynamo Kazan
16	Miriam Sylla	8 January 1995	1.87 m (6 ft 2 in)	80 kg (180 lb)	320 cm (130 in)	315 cm (124 in)	(Italy) Foppapedretti Bergamo
18	Paola Egonu	18 December 1998	1.93 m (6 ft 4 in)	70 kg (150 lb)	336 cm (132 in)	330 cm (130 in)	(Italy) Club Italia
20	Anna Danesi	20 April 1996	1.98 m (6 ft 6 in)	75 kg (165 lb)	312 cm (123 in)	308 cm (121 in)	(Italy) Club Italia

=== Netherlands ===
The following is the Dutch roster in the women's volleyball tournament of the 2016 Summer Olympics.

Head coach: (Italy) Giovanni Guidetti

No.	Name	Date of birth	Height	Weight	Spike	Block	2015–16 club
2	Femke Stoltenborg	30 July 1991	1.90 m (6 ft 3 in)	81 kg (179 lb)	303 cm (119 in)	299 cm (118 in)	(Germany) MTV Stuttgart
3	Yvon Beliën	28 December 1993	1.88 m (6 ft 2 in)	73 kg (161 lb)	307 cm (121 in)	303 cm (119 in)	(Italy) River Volley Piacenza
4	Celeste Plak	26 October 1995	1.90 m (6 ft 3 in)	87 kg (192 lb)	314 cm (124 in)	302 cm (119 in)	(Italy) Volley Bergamo
5	Robin de Kruijf	5 May 1991	1.93 m (6 ft 4 in)	81 kg (179 lb)	313 cm (123 in)	300 cm (120 in)	(Turkey) VakifBank Istanbul
6	Maret Balkestein-Grothues (c)	16 September 1988	1.80 m (5 ft 11 in)	68 kg (150 lb)	304 cm (120 in)	285 cm (112 in)	(Poland) Atom Trefl Sopot
7	Quinta Steenbergen	2 April 1985	1.89 m (6 ft 2 in)	75 kg (165 lb)	309 cm (122 in)	300 cm (120 in)	(Czech Republic) VK Prostějov
8	Judith Pietersen	3 July 1989	1.88 m (6 ft 2 in)	73 kg (161 lb)	306 cm (120 in)	296 cm (117 in)	(Italy) Pallavolo Scandicci
9	Myrthe Schoot (L)	29 August 1988	1.84 m (6 ft 0 in)	70 kg (150 lb)	298 cm (117 in)	286 cm (113 in)	(Germany) Dresdner SC
10	Lonneke Slöetjes	15 November 1990	1.92 m (6 ft 4 in)	76 kg (168 lb)	322 cm (127 in)	315 cm (124 in)	(Turkey) VakifBank Istanbul
11	Anne Buijs	2 December 1991	1.91 m (6 ft 3 in)	73 kg (161 lb)	317 cm (125 in)	299 cm (118 in)	(Turkey) VakifBank Istanbul
14	Laura Dijkema	18 February 1990	1.84 m (6 ft 0 in)	70 kg (150 lb)	293 cm (115 in)	279 cm (110 in)	(Germany) Dresdner SC
16	Debby Stam	24 July 1984	1.84 m (6 ft 0 in)	69 kg (152 lb)	303 cm (119 in)	281 cm (111 in)	(France) Rocheville Le Cannet

=== Puerto Rico ===
The following is the Puerto Rican roster in the women's volleyball tournament of the 2016 Summer Olympics.

Head coach: Juan Carlos Núñez

No.	Name	Date of birth	Height	Weight	Spike	Block	2015–16 club
1	Debora Seilhamer (L)	4 October 1985	1.66 m (5 ft 5 in)	61 kg (134 lb)	245 cm (96 in)	240 cm (94 in)	(Puerto Rico) Lancheras de Cataño
2	Shara Venegas (L)	18 September 1992	1.73 m (5 ft 8 in)	68 kg (150 lb)	280 cm (110 in)	272 cm (107 in)	(Puerto Rico) Criollas de Caguas
3	Vilmarie Mojica	13 August 1985	1.80 m (5 ft 11 in)	63 kg (139 lb)	295 cm (116 in)	288 cm (113 in)	(Puerto Rico) Valencianas de Juncos
6	Yarimar Rosa (c)	20 June 1988	1.78 m (5 ft 10 in)	62 kg (137 lb)	295 cm (116 in)	285 cm (112 in)	(Turkey) Beşiktaş
7	Stephanie Enright	15 December 1990	1.79 m (5 ft 10 in)	56 kg (123 lb)	300 cm (120 in)	292 cm (115 in)	(Puerto Rico) Criollas de Caguas
9	Áurea Cruz	10 January 1982	1.80 m (5 ft 11 in)	63 kg (139 lb)	310 cm (120 in)	290 cm (110 in)	(Italy) AGIL Novara
10	Diana Reyes	24 April 1993	1.91 m (6 ft 3 in)	76 kg (168 lb)	303 cm (119 in)	299 cm (118 in)	(Puerto Rico) Criollas de Caguas
11	Karina Ocasio	1 August 1985	1.92 m (6 ft 4 in)	76 kg (168 lb)	298 cm (117 in)	288 cm (113 in)	(Puerto Rico) Criollas de Caguas
14	Natalia Valentín	12 September 1989	1.70 m (5 ft 7 in)	61 kg (134 lb)	244 cm (96 in)	240 cm (94 in)	(Puerto Rico) Leonas de Ponce
15	Daly Santana	19 February 1995	1.78 m (5 ft 10 in)	63 kg (139 lb)	243 cm (96 in)	219 cm (86 in)	(Puerto Rico) Capitalinas de San Juan
16	Alexandra Oquendo	3 February 1984	1.89 m (6 ft 2 in)	75 kg (165 lb)	297 cm (117 in)	284 cm (112 in)	(Puerto Rico) Lancheras de Cataño
18	Lynda Morales	20 May 1988	1.88 m (6 ft 2 in)	74 kg (163 lb)	250 cm (98 in)	248 cm (98 in)	(Puerto Rico) Criollas de Caguas

=== Serbia ===
The following is the Serbian roster in the women's volleyball tournament of the 2016 Summer Olympics.

Head coach: Zoran Terzić

No.	Name	Date of birth	Height	Weight	Spike	Block	2015–16 club
1	Bianka Buša	25 July 1994	1.87 m (6 ft 2 in)	74 kg (163 lb)	293 cm (115 in)	282 cm (111 in)	(Romania) CSM Târgoviște
2	Jovana Brakočević	5 March 1988	1.96 m (6 ft 5 in)	82 kg (181 lb)	310 cm (120 in)	295 cm (116 in)	(Turkey) Vakıfbank Istanbul
4	Bojana Živković	29 March 1988	1.86 m (6 ft 1 in)	72 kg (159 lb)	300 cm (120 in)	292 cm (115 in)	(Switzerland) Voléro Zürich
6	Tijana Malešević	18 March 1991	1.85 m (6 ft 1 in)	78 kg (172 lb)	300 cm (120 in)	286 cm (113 in)	(Italy) AGIL Novara
9	Brankica Mihajlović	13 April 1991	1.90 m (6 ft 3 in)	83 kg (183 lb)	315 cm (124 in)	311 cm (122 in)	(Turkey) Fenerbahçe
10	Maja Ognjenović (c)	6 August 1984	1.83 m (6 ft 0 in)	67 kg (148 lb)	300 cm (120 in)	293 cm (115 in)	(Italy) Nordmeccanica Piacenza
11	Stefana Veljković	9 January 1990	1.90 m (6 ft 3 in)	76 kg (168 lb)	320 cm (130 in)	305 cm (120 in)	(Poland) Chemik Police
12	Jelena Nikolić	13 April 1982	1.95 m (6 ft 5 in)	79 kg (174 lb)	315 cm (124 in)	300 cm (120 in)	(Turkey) Bursa BB
15	Jovana Stevanović	30 June 1992	1.93 m (6 ft 4 in)	72 kg (159 lb)	308 cm (121 in)	295 cm (116 in)	(Italy) Pomi Casalmaggiore
16	Milena Rašić	25 October 1990	1.93 m (6 ft 4 in)	72 kg (159 lb)	318 cm (125 in)	315 cm (124 in)	(Turkey) VakifBank Istanbul
17	Silvija Popović (L)	15 March 1986	1.78 m (5 ft 10 in)	65 kg (143 lb)	286 cm (113 in)	276 cm (109 in)	(Switzerland) Voléro Zürich
19	Tijana Bošković	8 March 1997	1.93 m (6 ft 4 in)	82 kg (181 lb)	325 cm (128 in)	317 cm (125 in)	(Turkey) Eczacıbaşı VitrA

=== United States ===
The following is the American roster in the women's volleyball tournament of the 2016 Summer Olympics.

Head coach: Karch Kiraly

No.	Name	Date of birth	Height	Weight	Spike	Block	2015–16 club
1	Alisha Glass	5 April 1988	1.81 m (5 ft 11 in)	72 kg (159 lb)	305 cm (120 in)	300 cm (120 in)	(Italy) Imoco Volley
2	Kayla Banwarth (L)	21 January 1989	1.75 m (5 ft 9 in)	75 kg (165 lb)	295 cm (116 in)	283 cm (111 in)	(United States) USA Volleyball
3	Courtney Thompson	4 November 1984	1.70 m (5 ft 7 in)	66 kg (146 lb)	276 cm (109 in)	263 cm (104 in)	(Brazil) Rio de Janeiro VC
5	Rachael Adams	3 June 1990	1.86 m (6 ft 1 in)	81 kg (179 lb)	318 cm (125 in)	307 cm (121 in)	(Italy) Imoco Volley
6	Carli Lloyd	6 August 1989	1.78 m (5 ft 10 in)	75 kg (165 lb)	313 cm (123 in)	295 cm (116 in)	(Italy) VBC Pallavollo Rosa
10	Jordan Larson	16 October 1986	1.87 m (6 ft 2 in)	75 kg (165 lb)	302 cm (119 in)	295 cm (116 in)	(Turkey) Eczacıbaşı VitrA
12	Kelly Murphy	20 October 1989	1.88 m (6 ft 2 in)	79 kg (174 lb)	315 cm (124 in)	307 cm (121 in)	(Japan) Ageo Medics
13	Christa Harmotto (c)	12 October 1986	1.87 m (6 ft 2 in)	79 kg (174 lb)	322 cm (127 in)	300 cm (120 in)	(Turkey) Fenerbahçe
15	Kimberly Hill	30 November 1989	1.93 m (6 ft 4 in)	72 kg (159 lb)	320 cm (130 in)	310 cm (120 in)	(Turkey) Vakıfbank Istanbul
16	Foluke Akinradewo	5 October 1987	1.89 m (6 ft 2 in)	79 kg (174 lb)	331 cm (130 in)	300 cm (120 in)	(Switzerland) Voléro Zürich
23	Kelsey Robinson	25 June 1992	1.84 m (6 ft 0 in)	75 kg (165 lb)	306 cm (120 in)	300 cm (120 in)	(Italy) Imoco Volley
25	Karsta Lowe	2 February 1993	1.93 m (6 ft 4 in)	82 kg (181 lb)	315 cm (124 in)	305 cm (120 in)	(Italy) Futura Volley

== See also ==
- Volleyball at the 2016 Summer Olympics – Men's team rosters
