= Cameroon at the 2016 Summer Olympics =

- IOC code: CMR
- NOC: Cameroon Olympic and Sports Committee
- Website: www.cnosc.org (in French)

in Rio de Janeiro
- Competitors: 24 in 6 sports
- Flag bearer: Wilfried Ntsengue
- Medals: Gold 0 Silver 0 Bronze 0 Total 0

Summer Olympics appearances (overview)
- 1964; 1968; 1972; 1976; 1980; 1984; 1988; 1992; 1996; 2000; 2004; 2008; 2012; 2016; 2020; 2024

Cameroon competed at the 2016 Summer Olympics in Rio de Janeiro, Brazil, from 5 to 21 August 2016. It was the nation's fourteenth consecutive appearance at the Summer Olympics.

Cameroon Olympic Sports Committee (French: Comité National Olympique et Sportif du Cameroun) sent a total of 24 athletes, 5 men and 19 women, to the Games, competing in six different sports. For the second straight time in history, Cameroon was represented by more female than male athletes due to its presence of the women's volleyball team.

Notable athletes in the Cameroon team were professional boxers Mahaman Smaila and Hassan N'Dam N'Jikam, who both staged their Olympic comebacks in Rio de Janeiro for nearly a decade, and wrestler Annabelle Ali, who joined triple jumper and double gold medalist Françoise Mbango-Etone as the only Cameroonians to appear in three consecutive editions of the Games. Middleweight boxer Wilfried Ntsengue, the youngest member of the team (aged 18), was the nation's flag bearer in the opening ceremony.

Cameroon left Rio de Janeiro without a single Olympic medal. Ali narrowly missed out of Cameroon's first medal of the Games, after losing the match to Russia's Ekaterina Bukina for the bronze in the women's 75 kg category.

== Athletics (track and field) ==
Cameroonian athletes achieved qualifying standards in the following athletics events (up to a maximum of 3 athletes in each event):

Key

- Note – Ranks given for track events are within the athlete's heat only
- Q = Qualified for the next round
- q = Qualified for the next round as a fastest loser or, in field events, by position without achieving the qualifying target
- NR = National record
- N/A = Round not applicable for the event
- Bye = Athlete not required to compete in round

Field events

Athlete	Event	Qualification		Final	
Athlete	Event	Distance	Position	Distance	Position
Auriol Dongmo	Women's shot put	17.92	10 q	16.82	12
Joëlle Mbumi Nkouindjin	Women's triple jump	13.11	36	Did not advance	

== Boxing ==
Cameroon entered four boxers to compete in each of the following weight classes into the Olympic boxing tournament. Simplice Fotsala, Wilfried Ntsengue, and 2008 Olympian Mahaman Smaila had claimed their Olympic spots at the 2016 African Qualification Tournament in Yaoundé. Returning for his second Games from a 12-year absence, light heavyweight boxer Hassan N'Dam N'Jikam rounded out the Cameroonian roster with his semifinal triumph at the 2016 APB and WSB Olympic Qualifier in Vargas, Venezuela.

Athlete	Event	Round of 32	Round of 16	Quarterfinals	Semifinals	Final	
Athlete	Event	Opposition Result	Opposition Result	Opposition Result	Opposition Result	Opposition Result	Rank
Simplice Fotsala	Men's light flyweight	Yafai (GBR); L 0–3	Did not advance				
Mahaman Smaila	Men's light welterweight	Gözgeç (TUR); L 0–3	Did not advance				
Wilfried Ntsengue	Men's middleweight	Vivas (COL); W 2–1	Abdin (EGY); L 0–3	Did not advance			
Hassan N'Dam N'Jikam	Men's light heavyweight	Borges (BRA); L 0–3	Did not advance				

== Judo ==
Cameroon qualified one judoka for the women's half-heavyweight category (78 kg) at the Games. Vanessa Atangana earned a continental quota spot from the Africa region as Cameroon's top-ranked judoka outside of direct qualifying position in the IJF World Ranking List of May 30, 2016.

Athlete	Event	Round of 32	Round of 16	Quarterfinals	Semifinals	Repechage	Final / BM	
Athlete	Event	Opposition Result	Opposition Result	Opposition Result	Opposition Result	Opposition Result	Opposition Result	Rank
Hortence Atangana	Women's −78 kg	Pogorzelec (POL); L 000–000 S	Did not advance					

== Volleyball ==
=== Indoor ===
==== Women's tournament ====
Cameroon women's volleyball team qualified for the Olympics by attaining a top finish and securing a lone outright berth at the African Olympic Qualifying Tournament in Yaoundé.

Team roster

The following was the Cameroonian roster in the women's volleyball tournament of the 2016 Summer Olympics.

Head coach: Jean-René Akono

No.	Name	Date of birth	Height	Weight	Spike	Block	2015–16 club
1	Stéphanie Fotso Mogoung	25 September 1987	1.84 m (6 ft 0 in)	78 kg (172 lb)	296 cm (117 in)	259 cm (102 in)	(France) VBC Chamalières
2	Christelle Tchoudjang (c)	7 July 1989	1.84 m (6 ft 0 in)	80 kg (180 lb)	295 cm (116 in)	260 cm (100 in)	(France) VBC Chamalières
4	Raïssa Nasser (L)	19 August 1994	1.73 m (5 ft 8 in)	73 kg (161 lb)	270 cm (110 in)	265 cm (104 in)	(France) La Rochelle
5	Théorine Aboa Mbeza	25 August 1992	1.82 m (6 ft 0 in)	78 kg (172 lb)	285 cm (112 in)	270 cm (110 in)	(Cameroon) FAP Yaoundé
6	Laetitia Moma Bassoko	9 October 1993	1.84 m (6 ft 0 in)	81 kg (179 lb)	312 cm (123 in)	287 cm (113 in)	(France) VBC Chamalières
7	Henriette Koulla	14 September 1992	1.69 m (5 ft 7 in)	67 kg (148 lb)	275 cm (108 in)	250 cm (98 in)	(France) Tremblay AC
10	Berthrade Bikatal	23 July 1992	1.83 m (6 ft 0 in)	76 kg (168 lb)	297 cm (117 in)	253 cm (100 in)	(Cameroon) Nyong-et-Kéllé
11	Victoire L'or Ngon Ntame	31 December 1985	1.77 m (5 ft 10 in)	79 kg (174 lb)	288 cm (113 in)	253 cm (100 in)	(Cameroon) INJS Yaoundé
12	Fawziya Abdoulkarim	1 March 1989	1.80 m (5 ft 11 in)	67 kg (148 lb)	292 cm (115 in)	259 cm (102 in)	(Cameroon) Bafia Evolution
13	Madeleine Bodo Essissima	29 April 1992	1.82 m (6 ft 0 in)	75 kg (165 lb)	275 cm (108 in)	270 cm (110 in)	(Cameroon) FAP Yaoundé
14	Yolande Amana Guigolo	15 September 1997	1.84 m (6 ft 0 in)	78 kg (172 lb)	275 cm (108 in)	270 cm (110 in)	(Cameroon) Bafia Evolution
15	Emelda Piata Zessi	8 April 1997	1.90 m (6 ft 3 in)	65 kg (143 lb)	275 cm (108 in)	270 cm (110 in)	(Cameroon) Bafia Evolution

Group play

Pos	Team	Pld	W	L	Pts	SW	SL	SR	SPW	SPL	SPR	Qualification
1	Brazil (H)	5	5	0	15	15	0	MAX	377	272	1.386	Quarter-finals
2	Russia	5	4	1	12	12	4	3.000	393	323	1.217	Quarter-finals
3	South Korea	5	3	2	9	10	7	1.429	384	372	1.032	Quarter-finals
4	Japan	5	2	3	6	7	9	0.778	347	364	0.953	Quarter-finals
5	Argentina	5	1	4	2	3	14	0.214	319	407	0.784	
6	Cameroon	5	0	5	1	2	15	0.133	328	410	0.800	

Source: FIVB
Rules for classification: Tiebreakers
(H) Host

6 August 2016; 15:00	Brazil	3–0	Cameroon	Ginásio do Maracanãzinho, Rio de Janeiro; Attendance: 7,890; Referees: Heike Kraft (GER), Liu Jiang (CHN)
6 August 2016; 15:00	(25–14, 25–21, 25–13); Result Statistics			Ginásio do Maracanãzinho, Rio de Janeiro; Attendance: 7,890; Referees: Heike Kraft (GER), Liu Jiang (CHN)

8 August 2016; 11:35	Japan	3–0	Cameroon	Ginásio do Maracanãzinho, Rio de Janeiro; Attendance: 5,400; Referees: Rogerio Espicalsky (BRA), Hernán Casamiquela (ARG)
8 August 2016; 11:35	(25–20, 25–15, 25–17); Result Statistics			Ginásio do Maracanãzinho, Rio de Janeiro; Attendance: 5,400; Referees: Rogerio Espicalsky (BRA), Hernán Casamiquela (ARG)

10 August 2016; 17:05	Russia	3–0	Cameroon	Ginásio do Maracanãzinho, Rio de Janeiro; Attendance: 6,396; Referees: Ibrahim Al-Naama (QAT), Mohammad Shahmiri (IRI)
10 August 2016; 17:05	(25–19, 25–22, 25–23); Result Statistics			Ginásio do Maracanãzinho, Rio de Janeiro; Attendance: 6,396; Referees: Ibrahim Al-Naama (QAT), Mohammad Shahmiri (IRI)

12 August 2016; 11:35	Argentina	3–2	Cameroon	Ginásio do Maracanãzinho, Rio de Janeiro; Attendance: 5,345; Referees: Taoufik Boudaya (TUN), Arturo di Giacomo (BEL)
12 August 2016; 11:35	(19–25, 25–19, 26–28, 25–21, 15–13); Result Statistics			Ginásio do Maracanãzinho, Rio de Janeiro; Attendance: 5,345; Referees: Taoufik Boudaya (TUN), Arturo di Giacomo (BEL)

14 August 2016; 11:35	South Korea	3–0	Cameroon	Ginásio do Maracanãzinho, Rio de Janeiro; Attendance: 6,893; Referees: Luis Macias (MEX), Rogerio Espicalsky (BRA)
14 August 2016; 11:35	(25–15, 25–22, 25–20); Result Statistics			Ginásio do Maracanãzinho, Rio de Janeiro; Attendance: 6,893; Referees: Luis Macias (MEX), Rogerio Espicalsky (BRA)

== Weightlifting ==
Cameroon qualified one male and one female weightlifter for the Rio Olympics by virtue of a top five national finish (for men) and top four (for women), respectively, at the 2016 African Championships. The team had to allocate these places to individual athletes by June 20, 2016.

Athlete	Event	Snatch		Clean & Jerk		Total	Rank
Athlete	Event	Result	Rank	Result	Rank	Total	Rank
Petit Minkoumba	Men's −94 kg	140	16	165	16	305	16
Arcangeline Fouodji	Women's −69 kg	82	16	105	14	187	14

== Wrestling ==
Cameroon qualified three wrestlers for each of the following weight classes into the Olympic tournament, as a result of their semifinal triumphs at the 2016 African & Oceania Qualification Tournament.

Key

- VT - Victory by Fall.
- PP - Decision by Points - the loser with technical points.
- PO - Decision by Points - the loser without technical points.
- ST – Technical superiority – the loser without technical points and a margin of victory of at least 8 (Greco-Roman) or 10 (freestyle) points.

Women's freestyle

Athlete	Event	Qualification	Round of 16	Quarterfinal	Semifinal	Repechage 1	Repechage 2	Final / BM	
Athlete	Event	Opposition Result	Opposition Result	Opposition Result	Opposition Result	Opposition Result	Opposition Result	Opposition Result	Rank
Rebecca Muambo	−48 kg	Yankova (BUL); L 0–4 ^{ST}	Did not advance						16
Joseph Essombe	−53 kg	Bye	Argüello (VEN); L 0–5 ^{VT}	Did not advance					16
Annabelle Ali	−75 kg	Bye	Weffer (VEN); W 3–0 ^{PO}	Manyurova (KAZ); L 1–3 ^{PP}	Did not advance	Bye	Németh (HUN); W 3–1 ^{PP}	Bukina (RUS); L 1–3 ^{PP}	5
