= 2017 Women's African Volleyball Championship =

Tournament details
- Host country: Cameroon
- City: Yaoundé
- Dates: 7–14 October 2017
- Teams: 9
- Venue: 1 (in 1 host city)

Final positions
- Champions: Cameroon (1st title)

Tournament awards
- MVP: (Cameroon) Laetitia Moma Bassoko

Tournament statistics
- Matches played: 24

The 2017 Women's African Nations Championship was the 18th edition of the Women's African Volleyball Championship organised by Africa's governing volleyball body, the Confédération Africaine de Volleyball. Held in Yaoundé, Cameroon, the tournament took place from 7 to 14 October 2017. The top two teams, who had registered with FIVB for the 2018 World Championship, qualify to represent Africa in the 2018 FIVB Volleyball Women's World Championship.

Cameroon won the championship defeating Kenya and Egypt won the bronze medal over Senegal.

== Qualification ==
13 teams registered to participate in the 2017 Women's African Nations Championship, of which 4 later withdrew.

Means of qualification	Qualifier
Host country	Cameroon
FIVB ranking	Tunisia
FIVB ranking	Algeria
Zone 2	Senegal
Zone 2	~~Cape Verde~~*
Zone 3	Nigeria
Zone 3	~~Ghana~~*
Zone 4	DR Congo
Zone 5	Kenya
Zone 5	Egypt
Zone 6	Botswana
Wild cards	~~Zambia~~*
Wild cards	~~Chad~~*

* Withdrew.

== Venue ==
Yaoundé, Cameroon	2017 Women's African Volleyball Championship is located in Cameroon
Yaoundé Multipurpose Sports Complex	2017 Women's African Volleyball Championship is located in Cameroon
Capacity: 5,200	2017 Women's African Volleyball Championship is located in Cameroon

== Format ==
The tournament is played in two stages. In the first stage, the participants are divided in two groups. A single round-robin format is played within each group to determine the teams' group position (as per procedure below).

The two best teams of each group progress to the second stage, the second stage of the tournament consists of a single-elimination, with winners advancing to the next round until the final round.

=== Pool standing procedure ===
1. Number of matches won
2. Match points
3. Sets ratio
4. Points ratio
5. Result of the last match between the tied teams

Match won 3–0 or 3–1: 3 match points for the winner, 0 match points for the loser
Match won 3–2: 2 match points for the winner, 1 match point for the loser

== Pools composition ==
The drawing of lots was held in Yaoundé, Cameroon, on 6 October 2017.

Pool A	Pool B
Cameroon	Tunisia
Algeria	Kenya
Botswana	DR Congo
Egypt	Senegal
	Nigeria

== Preliminary round ==
- All times are West Africa Time (UTC+01:00).

=== Pool A ===
Pos	Team	Pld	W	L	Pts	SW	SL	SR	SPW	SPL	SPR	Qualification
1	Cameroon (H)	3	3	0	9	9	2	4.500	267	202	1.322	Semifinals
2	Egypt	3	2	1	6	7	3	2.333	238	196	1.214	Semifinals
3	Algeria	3	1	2	2	4	8	0.500	202	258	0.783	Fifth place playoffs
4	Botswana	3	0	3	1	2	9	0.222	194	245	0.792	Fifth place playoffs

Source: CAVB
(H) Host

Date	Time		Score		Set 1	Set 2	Set 3	Set 4	Set 5	Total	Report
7 Oct	19.00	Cameroon	3–0	Botswana	25–22	25–11	25–17			75–50	
8 Oct	18.00	Algeria	0–3	Egypt	12–25	17–25	14–25			43–75	
9 Oct	18.00	Cameroon	3–1	Algeria	25–20	25–9	17–25	25–10		92–64	
10 Oct	14.00	Egypt	3–0	Botswana	25–14	25–18	25–21			75–53	
11 Oct	12.00	Botswana	2–3	Algeria	25–14	21–25	25–16	12–25	8–15	91–95	
11 Oct	18.00	Egypt	1–3	Cameroon	25–20	28–30	17–25	18–25		88–100	

=== Pool B ===
Pos	Team	Pld	W	L	Pts	SW	SL	SR	SPW	SPL	SPR	Qualification
1	Kenya	4	4	0	12	12	0	MAX	303	194	1.562	Semifinals
2	Senegal	4	3	1	9	9	5	1.800	326	312	1.045	Semifinals
3	Tunisia	4	2	2	6	7	7	1.000	312	286	1.091	Fifth place playoffs
4	Nigeria	4	1	3	3	4	9	0.444	238	292	0.815	Fifth place playoffs
5	DR Congo	4	0	4	0	1	12	0.083	226	321	0.704	9th place

Source: CAVB

Date	Time		Score		Set 1	Set 2	Set 3	Set 4	Set 5	Total	Report
7 Oct	14.00	Senegal	3–1	DR Congo	25–21	21–25	25–21	25–15		96–82	
7 Oct	16.00	Kenya	3–0	Nigeria	25–16	25–8	25–10			75–34	
8 Oct	14.00	Nigeria	1–3	Tunisia	25–19	20–25	10–25	11–25		66–94	
8 Oct	16.00	Senegal	0–3	Kenya	21–25	26–28	15–25			62–78	
9 Oct	14.00	Kenya	3–0	DR Congo	25–17	25–15	25–12			75–44	
9 Oct	16.00	Tunisia	1–3	Senegal	23–25	19–25	25–18	22–25		89–93	
10 Oct	16.00	DR Congo	0–3	Nigeria	19–25	14–25	15–25			48–75	
10 Oct	18.00	Kenya	3–0	Tunisia	25–17	25–21	25–16			75–54	
11 Oct	14.00	Tunisia	3–0	DR Congo	25–18	25–14	25–20			75–52	
11 Oct	16.00	Nigeria	0–3	Senegal	23–25	20–25	20–25			63–75	

== Final round ==
- All times are West Africa Time (UTC+01:00).

=== Classification round ===
Fifth place playoffs
13 October
Algeria	3
Nigeria	1
13 October
Tunisia	3
Botswana	0

Fifth place
14 October
Algeria	1
Tunisia	3
Seventh place
14 October
Nigeria	3
Botswana	0

==== Fifth place playoffs ====
Date	Time		Score		Set 1	Set 2	Set 3	Set 4	Set 5	Total	Report
13 Oct	12:00	Algeria	3–1	Nigeria	25–13	25–11	22–25	25–20		97–69	
13 Oct	14:00	Tunisia	3–0	Botswana	25–16	25–17	25–14			75–47	

==== Seventh place match ====
Date	Time		Score		Set 1	Set 2	Set 3	Set 4	Set 5	Total	Report
14 Oct	12:00	Nigeria	3–0	Botswana	25–18	25–23	25–14			75–55	

==== Fifth place match ====
Date	Time		Score		Set 1	Set 2	Set 3	Set 4	Set 5	Total	Report
14 Oct	14:00	Algeria	1–3	Tunisia	13–25	21–25	25–23	16–25		75–98	

=== Championship round ===
Semifinals
13 October
Cameroon	3
Senegal	0
13 October
Kenya	3
Egypt	0

Final
14 October
Cameroon	3
Kenya	0
Third place
14 October
Senegal	0
Egypt	3

==== Semifinals ====
Date	Time		Score		Set 1	Set 2	Set 3	Set 4	Set 5	Total	Report
13 Oct	16:00	Kenya	3–0	Egypt	25–23	25–22	25–19			75–64	
13 Oct	18:00	Cameroon	3–0	Senegal	25–19	25–20	27–25			77–64	

==== Third place match ====
Date	Time		Score		Set 1	Set 2	Set 3	Set 4	Set 5	Total	Report
14 Oct	16:00	Egypt	3–0	Senegal	25–20	25–19	25–23			75–62	

==== Final ====
Date	Time		Score		Set 1	Set 2	Set 3	Set 4	Set 5	Total	Report
14 Oct	18:00	Kenya	0–3	Cameroon	22–25	19–25	27–29			68–79	

== Final standing ==
Rank	Team
1st place, gold medalist(s)	Cameroon
2nd place, silver medalist(s)	Kenya
3rd place, bronze medalist(s)	Egypt
4	Senegal
5	Tunisia
6	Algeria
7	Nigeria
8	Botswana
9	DR Congo

Qualified for the 2018 World Championship

Source: CAVB.

2017 Women's African Volleyball Championship

Cameroon
1st title

14–woman squad
Stéphanie Fotso Mogoung, Christelle Nana Tchoudjang, Raïssa Nasser, Théorine Aboa Mbeza, Laetitia Moma Bassoko, Henriette Koulla, Berthrade Bikatal, Victoire L'or Ngon Ntame, Fawziya Abdoulkarim, Madeleine Bodo Essissima, Yolande Amana Guigolo, Emelda Piata Zessi, Odile Leopoldine Adiana Estelle, Odette Ahirnidi
Head coach
Jean-René Akono

== Individual awards ==
- Most Valuable Player

(Cameroon) Laetitia Moma Bassoko

- Best setter

(Cameroon) Koulla Nadge

- Best receiver

(Senegal) Fatou Diouck

- Best libero

(Cameroon) Raïssa Nasser

- Best attacker

(Kenya) Mercy Moim

- Best blocker

(Kenya) Edith Wisa Mukuvulani

- Best server

(Egypt) Aya Elshamy

Source: CAVB.

== See also ==
- 2017 Men's African Volleyball Championship
