= 2019 FIVB Volleyball Women's World Cup squads =

This article shows the rosters of all participating teams at the 2019 FIVB Volleyball Women's World Cup in Japan.

== Argentina ==
The following is the Argentine roster in the 2019 FIVB Volleyball Women's World Cup.

Head coach: Hernan Ferraro

No.	Name	Date of birth	Height	Weight	Spike	Block	2019 club
1	Elina Rodríguez	11 February 1997	1.89 m (6 ft 2 in)	72 kg (159 lb)	300 cm (120 in)	284 cm (112 in)	(Argentina) San Lorenzo
3	Yamila Nizetich	27 January 1989	1.81 m (5 ft 11 in)	74 kg (163 lb)	305 cm (120 in)	295 cm (116 in)	(Italy) Pesaro
4	Daniela Bulaich	5 September 1997	1.72 m (5 ft 8 in)	53 kg (117 lb)	274 cm (108 in)	263 cm (104 in)	(Argentina) San Lorenzo
5	Lucía Fresco	14 May 1995	1.95 m (6 ft 5 in)	92 kg (203 lb)	304 cm (120 in)	290 cm (110 in)	(Hungary) Békéscsabai RSE
8	Victoria Michel Tosi	1 July 1999	1.82 m (6 ft 0 in)	69 kg (152 lb)	283 cm (111 in)	273 cm (107 in)	(Argentina) San Lorenzo
11	Julieta Lazcano (c)	25 June 1989	1.90 m (6 ft 3 in)	74 kg (163 lb)	312 cm (123 in)	293 cm (115 in)	(France) Saint-Cloud Paris
12	Tatiana Rizzo	30 December 1986	1.78 m (5 ft 10 in)	64 kg (141 lb)	280 cm (110 in)	268 cm (106 in)	(Argentina) Boca Juniors
13	Bianca Farriol	18 December 2001	1.80 m (5 ft 11 in)	68 kg (150 lb)	290 cm (110 in)	270 cm (110 in)	(Argentina) San Lorenzo
14	Victoria Mayer	19 June 2001	1.80 m (5 ft 11 in)	59 kg (130 lb)	285 cm (112 in)	265 cm (104 in)	(Argentina) Santa Fe
18	Valentina Gonzalez	23 February 1998	1.63 m (5 ft 4 in)	56 kg (123 lb)	271 cm (107 in)	260 cm (100 in)	(Argentina) Estudiantes - La Plata
23	Agostina Soria	9 October 1998	1.79 m (5 ft 10 in)	65 kg (143 lb)	279 cm (110 in)	271 cm (107 in)	(Argentina) Vélez Sarsfield
24	Candelaria Salinas	23 May 2000	1.83 m (6 ft 0 in)	64 kg (141 lb)	278 cm (109 in)	265 cm (104 in)	(Argentina) Boca Juniors
26	Sol Piccolo	11 September 1996	1.84 m (6 ft 0 in)	74 kg (163 lb)	294 cm (116 in)	282 cm (111 in)	(Argentina) Vélez Sarsfield
30	Azul Benítez	5 February 1998	1.69 m (5 ft 7 in)	57 kg (126 lb)	272 cm (107 in)	263 cm (104 in)	(Argentina) Mar Chiquita

== Brazil ==
The following is the Brazilian roster in the 2019 FIVB Volleyball Women's World Cup.

Head coach: José Roberto Guimarães

No.	Name	Date of birth	Height	Weight	Spike	Block	2019 club
1	Fabiana Claudino (c)	24 January 1985	1.93 m (6 ft 4 in)	76 kg (168 lb)	314 cm (124 in)	293 cm (115 in)	(Brazil) Praia Clube
2	Mara Leão	26 July 1991	1.90 m (6 ft 3 in)	84 kg (185 lb)	320 cm (130 in)	301 cm (119 in)	(Brazil) Osasco-Audax
3	Macris Carneiro	3 March 1989	1.78 m (5 ft 10 in)	64 kg (141 lb)	292 cm (115 in)	275 cm (108 in)	(Brazil) Minas T.C.
6	Gabriela Candido	22 May 1996	1.81 m (5 ft 11 in)	75 kg (165 lb)	296 cm (117 in)	285 cm (112 in)	(Brazil) Vôlei Bauru
7	Amanda Francisco	16 August 1988	1.80 m (5 ft 11 in)	62 kg (137 lb)	304 cm (120 in)	286 cm (113 in)	(Brazil) SESC-Rio
9	Roberta Ratzke	28 April 1990	1.85 m (6 ft 1 in)	71 kg (157 lb)	287 cm (113 in)	278 cm (109 in)	(Brazil) Osasco-Audax
10	Gabriela Guimarães	19 May 1994	1.80 m (5 ft 11 in)	65 kg (143 lb)	305 cm (120 in)	289 cm (114 in)	(Turkey) VakıfBank S.K.
13	Sheilla Castro	1 July 1983	1.85 m (6 ft 1 in)	64 kg (141 lb)	302 cm (119 in)	284 cm (112 in)	(Brazil) Minas T.C.
15	Ana Carolina da Silva	8 April 1991	1.83 m (6 ft 0 in)	73 kg (161 lb)	290 cm (110 in)	290 cm (110 in)	(Brazil) Praia Clube
18	Camila Brait	28 October 1988	1.70 m (5 ft 7 in)	58 kg (128 lb)	271 cm (107 in)	256 cm (101 in)	(Brazil) Osasco-Audax
19	Léia Silva	1 March 1985	1.60 m (5 ft 3 in)	60 kg (130 lb)	275 cm (108 in)	269 cm (106 in)	(Brazil) Minas T.C.
20	Ana Beatriz Corrêa	7 February 1992	1.87 m (6 ft 2 in)	70 kg (150 lb)	298 cm (117 in)	292 cm (115 in)	(Brazil) Osasco-Audax
21	Drussyla Costa	1 July 1996	1.82 m (6 ft 0 in)	73 kg (161 lb)	304 cm (120 in)	286 cm (113 in)	(Brazil) SESC-Rio
24	Lorenne Teixeira	8 January 1996	1.87 m (6 ft 2 in)	72 kg (159 lb)	306 cm (120 in)	289 cm (114 in)	(Brazil) Barueri

== Cameroon ==
The following is the Cameroonian roster in the 2019 FIVB Volleyball Women's World Cup.

Head coach: Jean-René Akono

No.	Name	Date of birth	Height	Weight	Spike	Block	2019 club
1	Stéphanie Fotso Mogoung	25 September 1987	1.84 m (6 ft 0 in)	78 kg (172 lb)	296 cm (117 in)	259 cm (102 in)	(France) VBC Chamalières
2	Christelle Tchoudjang (c)	7 July 1989	1.84 m (6 ft 0 in)	80 kg (180 lb)	295 cm (116 in)	260 cm (100 in)	(France) VBC Chamalières
4	Raïssa Nasser	19 August 1994	1.73 m (5 ft 8 in)	73 kg (161 lb)	270 cm (110 in)	265 cm (104 in)	(France) La Rochelle
5	Paule Arielle Olomo	30 January 2001	1.85 m (6 ft 1 in)	70 kg (150 lb)	285 cm (112 in)	270 cm (110 in)	(Cameroon) Bafia Evolution
6	Laetitia Moma Bassoko	9 October 1993	1.84 m (6 ft 0 in)	81 kg (179 lb)	312 cm (123 in)	287 cm (113 in)	(France) VBC Chamalières
9	Honorine Gamkoua	27 February 1992	1.72 m (5 ft 8 in)	65 kg (143 lb)	280 cm (110 in)	270 cm (110 in)	(Cameroon) FAB
10	Berthrade Bikatal	23 July 1992	1.83 m (6 ft 0 in)	76 kg (168 lb)	297 cm (117 in)	253 cm (100 in)	(Cameroon) Nyong-et-Kéllé
11	Sheryline Bashorun	26 September 1993	1.85 m (6 ft 1 in)	72 kg (159 lb)	297 cm (117 in)	288 cm (113 in)	(Cameroon) Istre Provence
12	Fawziya Abdoulkarim	1 March 1989	1.80 m (5 ft 11 in)	67 kg (148 lb)	292 cm (115 in)	259 cm (102 in)	(Cameroon) Bafia Evolution
14	Yolande Amana Guigolo	15 September 1997	1.84 m (6 ft 0 in)	78 kg (172 lb)	275 cm (108 in)	270 cm (110 in)	(Cameroon) Bafia Evolution
15	Emelda Piata Zessi	8 April 1997	1.90 m (6 ft 3 in)	65 kg (143 lb)	275 cm (108 in)	270 cm (110 in)	(Cameroon) Bafia Evolution
16	Estelle Adiana	14 May 1997	1.82 m (6 ft 0 in)	85 kg (187 lb)	285 cm (112 in)	256 cm (101 in)	(Cameroon) Nyong Elle
18	Odette Ahirinidi Menkred	5 November 1999	1.74 m (5 ft 9 in)	68 kg (150 lb)	270 cm (110 in)	250 cm (98 in)	(Cameroon) INJS
20	Ruth Marie Bibinbe	23 April 2002	1.98 m (6 ft 6 in)	90 kg (200 lb)	330 cm (130 in)	310 cm (120 in)	(Cameroon) Bafia Evolution

== China ==
The following is the Chinese roster in the 2019 FIVB Volleyball Women's World Cup.

Head coach: Lang Ping

No.	Name	Date of birth	Height	Weight	Spike	Block	2018–19 club
1	Yuan Xinyue	21 December 1996	2.01 m (6 ft 7 in)	78 kg (172 lb)	317 cm (125 in)	311 cm (122 in)	(China) Bayi Shenzhen
2	Zhu Ting (c)	29 November 1994	1.98 m (6 ft 6 in)	78 kg (172 lb)	327 cm (129 in)	300 cm (120 in)	(Turkey) Vakıfbank Sports Club
6	Gong Xiangyu	21 April 1997	1.86 m (6 ft 1 in)	72 kg (159 lb)	313 cm (123 in)	302 cm (119 in)	(China) Jiangsu Zenith Steel
7	Wang Yuanyuan	14 July 1997	1.97 m (6 ft 6 in)	75 kg (165 lb)	312 cm (123 in)	300 cm (120 in)	(China) Tianjin Bohai Bank
8	Zeng Chunlei	3 November 1989	1.87 m (6 ft 2 in)	67 kg (148 lb)	315 cm (124 in)	315 cm (124 in)	(China) Beijing Baic Auto
9	Zhang Changning	6 November 1995	1.95 m (6 ft 5 in)	80 kg (180 lb)	315 cm (124 in)	303 cm (119 in)	(China) Jiangsu Zenith Steel
10	Liu Xiaotong	16 February 1990	1.88 m (6 ft 2 in)	65 kg (143 lb)	312 cm (123 in)	300 cm (120 in)	(China) Beijing Baic Auto
11	Yao Di	15 August 1992	1.82 m (6 ft 0 in)	83 kg (183 lb)	306 cm (120 in)	298 cm (117 in)	(China) Tianjin Bohai Bank
12	Li Yingying	19 February 2000	1.96 m (6 ft 5 in)	71 kg (157 lb)	302 cm (119 in)	294 cm (116 in)	(China) Tianjin Bohai Bank
14	Zheng Yixin	6 May 1995	1.87 m (6 ft 2 in)	71 kg (157 lb)	316 cm (124 in)	307 cm (121 in)	(China) Fujian Xi Meng Bao
15	Lin Li	5 July 1992	1.71 m (5 ft 7 in)	65 kg (143 lb)	294 cm (116 in)	294 cm (116 in)	(China) Fujian Xi Meng Bao
16	Ding Xia	13 January 1990	1.80 m (5 ft 11 in)	67 kg (148 lb)	305 cm (120 in)	300 cm (120 in)	(China) Liaoning Seagull
17	Yan Ni	2 March 1987	1.92 m (6 ft 4 in)	74 kg (163 lb)	317 cm (125 in)	306 cm (120 in)	(China) Liaoning Seagull
18	Wang Mengjie	14 November 1995	1.72 m (5 ft 8 in)	65 kg (143 lb)	289 cm (114 in)	280 cm (110 in)	(China) Shandong Sports Lottery
19	Liu Yanhan	19 January 1993	1.90 m (6 ft 3 in)	75 kg (165 lb)	315 cm (124 in)	305 cm (120 in)	(China) Bayi Shenzhen

== Dominican Republic ==
The following is the Dominican roster in the 2019 FIVB Volleyball Women's World Cup.

Head coach: Marcos Kwiek

No.	Name	Date of birth	Height	Weight	Spike	Block	2019 club
1	Annerys Vargas	7 August 1981	1.96 m (6 ft 5 in)	70 kg (150 lb)	327 cm (129 in)	320 cm (130 in)	Free agent
2	Yaneirys Rodriguez	26 June 2000	1.71 m (5 ft 7 in)	56 kg (123 lb)	280 cm (110 in)	251 cm (99 in)	(Dominican Republic) Bonao
3	Lisvel Elisa Eve	10 September 1991	1.94 m (6 ft 4 in)	70 kg (150 lb)	325 cm (128 in)	315 cm (124 in)	(Dominican Republic) Puerto Plata
6	Camil Domínguez	7 December 1991	1.76 m (5 ft 9 in)	75 kg (165 lb)	232 cm (91 in)	275 cm (108 in)	(Dominican Republic) Mirador
7	Niverka Marte	19 October 1990	1.78 m (5 ft 10 in)	71 kg (157 lb)	295 cm (116 in)	283 cm (111 in)	(Dominican Republic) Deportivo Nacional
8	Cándida Arias	11 March 1992	1.94 m (6 ft 4 in)	68 kg (150 lb)	320 cm (130 in)	315 cm (124 in)	(Dominican Republic) San Cristóbal
14	Prisilla Rivera (c)	29 December 1984	1.83 m (6 ft 0 in)	67 kg (148 lb)	309 cm (122 in)	305 cm (120 in)	(Dominican Republic) San Pedro de Macorís
16	Yonkaira Peña	10 May 1993	1.90 m (6 ft 3 in)	70 kg (150 lb)	320 cm (130 in)	310 cm (120 in)	(Brazil) Rio de Janeiro
17	Gina Mambrú	21 January 1986	1.82 m (6 ft 0 in)	65 kg (143 lb)	330 cm (130 in)	315 cm (124 in)	(Dominican Republic) Los Cachorros
18	Bethania de la Cruz	13 May 1987	1.88 m (6 ft 2 in)	70 kg (150 lb)	330 cm (130 in)	320 cm (130 in)	(Italy) Scandicci
20	Brayelin Martínez	11 September 1996	2.01 m (6 ft 7 in)	83 kg (183 lb)	330 cm (130 in)	320 cm (130 in)	(Italy) Casalmaggiore
21	Jineiry Martínez	3 December 1997	1.90 m (6 ft 3 in)	68 kg (150 lb)	305 cm (120 in)	280 cm (110 in)	(Dominican Republic) Mirador
23	Gaila González	25 June 1997	1.88 m (6 ft 2 in)	73 kg (161 lb)	304 cm (120 in)	276 cm (109 in)	(Dominican Republic) Mirador
26	Larysmer Caro	18 October 1996	1.74 m (5 ft 9 in)	68 kg (150 lb)	288 cm (113 in)	258 cm (102 in)	(Dominican Republic) Deportivo Nacional

== Japan ==
The following is the Japanese roster in the 2019 FIVB Volleyball Women's World Cup.

Head coach: Kumi Nakada

No.	Name	Date of birth	Height	Weight	Spike	Block	2019 club
2	Sarina Koga	21 May 1996	1.80 m (5 ft 11 in)	67 kg (148 lb)	302 cm (119 in)	290 cm (110 in)	(Japan) NEC Red Rockets
3	Nana Iwasaka (c)	3 July 1990	1.87 m (6 ft 2 in)	75 kg (165 lb)	297 cm (117 in)	293 cm (115 in)	(Japan) Hisamitsu Springs
4	Risa Shinnabe	11 July 1990	1.73 m (5 ft 8 in)	64 kg (141 lb)	292 cm (115 in)	285 cm (112 in)	(Japan) Hisamitsu Springs
5	Erika Araki	3 August 1984	1.86 m (6 ft 1 in)	81 kg (179 lb)	302 cm (119 in)	297 cm (117 in)	(Japan) Toyota Auto Body Queenseis
6	Haruka Miyashita	1 September 1994	1.77 m (5 ft 10 in)	61 kg (134 lb)	291 cm (115 in)	272 cm (107 in)	(Japan) Okayama Seagulls
7	Yuki Ishii	8 May 1991	1.80 m (5 ft 11 in)	68 kg (150 lb)	305 cm (120 in)	287 cm (113 in)	(Japan) Hisamitsu Springs
11	Yurie Nabeya	15 December 1993	1.76 m (5 ft 9 in)	55 kg (121 lb)	305 cm (120 in)	292 cm (115 in)	(Japan) Denso Airybees
12	Miya Sato	7 March 1990	1.75 m (5 ft 9 in)	62 kg (137 lb)	278 cm (109 in)	275 cm (108 in)	(Japan) Hitachi Rivale
13	Mai Okumura	31 October 1990	1.77 m (5 ft 10 in)	69 kg (152 lb)	295 cm (116 in)	285 cm (112 in)	(Thailand) Nakhon Ratchasima
14	Mako Kobata	15 August 1992	1.64 m (5 ft 5 in)	56 kg (123 lb)	285 cm (112 in)	274 cm (108 in)	(Japan) JT Marvelous
16	Ai Kurogo	14 June 1998	1.80 m (5 ft 11 in)	69 kg (152 lb)	306 cm (120 in)	295 cm (116 in)	(Japan) Toray Arrows
18	Akane Yamagishi	8 January 1991	1.65 m (5 ft 5 in)	55 kg (121 lb)	280 cm (110 in)	260 cm (100 in)	(Japan) Ageo Medics
21	Miwako Osanai	19 July 1997	1.75 m (5 ft 9 in)	67 kg (148 lb)	293 cm (115 in)	270 cm (110 in)	(Japan) Hitachi Rivale
24	Aika Akutagawa	3 April 1991	1.80 m (5 ft 11 in)	62 kg (137 lb)	300 cm (120 in)	280 cm (110 in)	(Japan) JT Marvelous
28	Mayu Ishikawa	14 May 2000	1.73 m (5 ft 8 in)	66 kg (146 lb)	300 cm (120 in)	285 cm (112 in)	(Japan) Toray Arrows

== Kenya ==
The following is the Kenyan roster in the 2019 FIVB Volleyball Women's World Cup.

Head coach: Paul Busienei Bitok

No.	Name	Date of birth	Height	Weight	Spike	Block	2019 club
1	Jane Wairimu	24 March 1985	1.75 m (5 ft 9 in)	60 kg (130 lb)	299 cm (118 in)	285 cm (112 in)	Kenya Prisons
3	Violet Makuto	20 May 1993	1.67 m (5 ft 6 in)	65 kg (143 lb)	298 cm (117 in)	290 cm (110 in)	Kenya Pipelines
4	Leonida Kasaya	10 October 1993	1.68 m (5 ft 6 in)	67 kg (148 lb)	297 cm (117 in)	292 cm (115 in)	Kenya Pipelines
5	Sharon Kiprono	26 October 1998	1.83 m (6 ft 0 in)	82 kg (181 lb)	293 cm (115 in)	281 cm (111 in)	Kenya Prisons
7	Jannet Wanja	24 February 1984	1.75 m (5 ft 9 in)	59 kg (130 lb)	299 cm (118 in)	287 cm (113 in)	Kenya Pipelines
8	Triza Atuka	14 April 1992	1.88 m (6 ft 2 in)	65 kg (143 lb)	298 cm (117 in)	293 cm (115 in)	Kenya Pipelines
9	Elizabeth Wanyama	27 May 1987	1.74 m (5 ft 9 in)	68 kg (150 lb)	270 cm (110 in)	260 cm (100 in)	Kenya Prisons
10	Noel Murambi	29 January 1989	1.78 m (5 ft 10 in)	68 kg (150 lb)	302 cm (119 in)	297 cm (117 in)	Kenya Pipelines
13	Carolyne Sirengo	4 November 1996	1.79 m (5 ft 10 in)	70 kg (150 lb)	280 cm (110 in)	240 cm (94 in)	Kenya Pipelines
14	Mercy Moim (c)	1 January 1989	1.83 m (6 ft 0 in)	72 kg (159 lb)	320 cm (130 in)	308 cm (121 in)	Kenya Prisons
15	Lorine Kaei	8 October 1999	1.79 m (5 ft 10 in)	69 kg (152 lb)	285 cm (112 in)	270 cm (110 in)	Kenya Prisons
16	Agripina Kundu	24 April 1993	1.74 m (5 ft 9 in)	63 kg (139 lb)	260 cm (100 in)	250 cm (98 in)	Kenya Pipelines
18	Emmaculate Chemtai	14 October 1993	1.80 m (5 ft 11 in)	68 kg (150 lb)	300 cm (120 in)	285 cm (112 in)	Kenya Prisons
19	Edith Mukuvilani	20 July 1994	1.84 m (6 ft 0 in)	72 kg (159 lb)	298 cm (117 in)	292 cm (115 in)	Kenya Prisons

== Netherlands ==
The following is the Dutch roster in the 2019 FIVB Volleyball Women's World Cup.

Head coach: Jamie Morrison

No.	Name	Date of birth	Height	Weight	Spike	Block	2019 club
1	Kirsten Knip	14 September 1992	1.75 m (5 ft 9 in)	70 kg (150 lb)	281 cm (111 in)	275 cm (108 in)	(Germany) Ladies in Black Aachen
3	Yvon Beliën	28 December 1993	1.88 m (6 ft 2 in)	73 kg (161 lb)	307 cm (121 in)	303 cm (119 in)	(Turkey) Beşiktaş
4	Celeste Plak	26 October 1995	1.90 m (6 ft 3 in)	87 kg (192 lb)	314 cm (124 in)	302 cm (119 in)	(Italy) Igor Gorgonzola Novara
6	Maret Balkestein-Grothues (c)	16 September 1988	1.80 m (5 ft 11 in)	68 kg (150 lb)	304 cm (120 in)	285 cm (112 in)	(Romania) CSM București
7	Juliët Lohuis	10 September 1996	1.90 m (6 ft 3 in)	77 kg (170 lb)	305 cm (120 in)	295 cm (116 in)	(Germany) USC Münster
9	Myrthe Schoot	29 August 1988	1.82 m (6 ft 0 in)	70 kg (150 lb)	298 cm (117 in)	286 cm (113 in)	(Germany) Rote Raben Vilsbiburg
10	Lonneke Slöetjes	15 November 1990	1.91 m (6 ft 3 in)	76 kg (168 lb)	322 cm (127 in)	315 cm (124 in)	(Turkey) VakıfBank
11	Anne Buijs	3 November 1996	1.91 m (6 ft 3 in)	73 kg (161 lb)	317 cm (125 in)	299 cm (118 in)	(Italy) Saugella Monza
12	Britt Bongaerts	3 November 1996	1.85 m (6 ft 1 in)	68 kg (150 lb)	296 cm (117 in)	284 cm (112 in)	(Germany) Schweriner SC
14	Laura Dijkema	18 February 1990	1.84 m (6 ft 0 in)	70 kg (150 lb)	293 cm (115 in)	269 cm (106 in)	(Italy) II Bisonte Firenze
17	Nicole Oude Luttikhuis	26 December 1997	1.91 m (6 ft 3 in)	82 kg (181 lb)	312 cm (123 in)	305 cm (120 in)	(Germany) Ladies in Black Aachen
18	Marrit Jasper	28 February 1996	1.80 m (5 ft 11 in)	75 kg (165 lb)	300 cm (120 in)	285 cm (112 in)	(Germany) Ladies in Black Aachen
22	Nicole Koolhaas	31 January 1991	1.98 m (6 ft 6 in)	77 kg (170 lb)	310 cm (120 in)	300 cm (120 in)	(Romania) CSM București
31	Eline Timmerman	30 December 1998	1.92 m (6 ft 4 in)	78 kg (172 lb)	303 cm (119 in)	295 cm (116 in)	(Netherlands) Eurosped TVT

== Russia ==
The following is the Russian roster in the 2019 FIVB Volleyball Women's World Cup.

Head coach: (Italy) Sergio Busato

No.	Name	Date of birth	Height	Weight	Spike	Block	2019 club
1	Angelina Lazarenko	23 April 1998	1.93 m (6 ft 4 in)	80 kg (180 lb)	320 cm (130 in)	305 cm (120 in)	(France) Volero Le Cannet
3	Ekaterina Efimova	3 July 1993	1.92 m (6 ft 4 in)	70 kg (150 lb)	305 cm (120 in)	295 cm (116 in)	(Russia) Dynamo Moscow
4	Daria Chikrizova	9 June 1990	1.77 m (5 ft 10 in)	69 kg (152 lb)	185 cm (73 in)	180 cm (71 in)	(Russia) Dinamo-Metar Chelyabinsk
6	Irina Zaryazhko	4 October 1991	1.96 m (6 ft 5 in)	78 kg (172 lb)	305 cm (120 in)	290 cm (110 in)	(Russia) Dynamo Kazan
7	Tatiana Romanova	9 September 1994	1.78 m (5 ft 10 in)	64 kg (141 lb)	292 cm (115 in)	285 cm (112 in)	(Russia) Uralochka-NTMK
8	Nataliya Goncharova	1 June 1989	1.94 m (6 ft 4 in)	75 kg (165 lb)	315 cm (124 in)	306 cm (120 in)	(Russia) Dynamo Moscow
9	Alla Galkina	15 April 1992	1.78 m (5 ft 10 in)	65 kg (143 lb)	295 cm (116 in)	290 cm (110 in)	(Russia) Lokomotiv Kaliningrad
11	Margarita Kurilo	21 June 1993	1.85 m (6 ft 1 in)	73 kg (161 lb)	304 cm (120 in)	290 cm (110 in)	(Russia) Yenisey Krasnoyarsk
13	Yevgeniya Startseva (c)	12 February 1989	1.85 m (6 ft 1 in)	68 kg (150 lb)	294 cm (116 in)	290 cm (110 in)	(Russia) Dynamo Kazan
16	Irina Voronkova	20 October 1995	1.90 m (6 ft 3 in)	84 kg (185 lb)	305 cm (120 in)	290 cm (110 in)	(Russia) Lokomotiv Kaliningrad
18	Ksenia Parubets	31 October 1994	1.83 m (6 ft 0 in)	64 kg (141 lb)	300 cm (120 in)	286 cm (113 in)	(Russia) Uralochka-NTMK
19	Maria Khaletskaya	31 July 1994	1.95 m (6 ft 5 in)	80 kg (180 lb)	311 cm (122 in)	302 cm (119 in)	(Russia) Dinamo Krasnodar
25	Yulia Brovkina	31 May 2001	1.96 m (6 ft 5 in)	70 kg (150 lb)	305 cm (120 in)	297 cm (117 in)	(Russia) Lokomotiv Kaliningrad
26	Anna Lazareva	31 January 1997	1.90 m (6 ft 3 in)	67 kg (148 lb)	315 cm (124 in)	300 cm (120 in)	(Russia) Dynamo Moscow

== Serbia ==
The following is the Serbian roster in the 2019 FIVB Volleyball Women's World Cup.

Head coach: Aleksandar Vladisavljev

No.	Name	Date of birth	Height	Weight	Spike	Block	2019 club
1	Bianka Buša	25 July 1994	1.87 m (6 ft 2 in)	74 kg (163 lb)	312 cm (123 in)	298 cm (117 in)	(Poland) KPS Chemik Police
2	Katarina Lazović	12 September 1999	1.82 m (6 ft 0 in)	65 kg (143 lb)	290 cm (110 in)	277 cm (109 in)	(Serbia) OK Vizura
5	Mina Popović	16 September 1994	1.87 m (6 ft 2 in)	73 kg (161 lb)	315 cm (124 in)	305 cm (120 in)	(Italy) II Bisonte Firenze
6	Maja Savić	14 August 1993	1.89 m (6 ft 2 in)	70 kg (150 lb)	305 cm (120 in)	295 cm (116 in)	(Serbia) Železničar Lajkovac
8	Slađana Mirković	8 October 1995	1.85 m (6 ft 1 in)	78 kg (172 lb)	293 cm (115 in)	283 cm (111 in)	(Poland) KPS Chemik Police
12	Teodora Pušić	16 October 1993	1.70 m (5 ft 7 in)	58 kg (128 lb)	270 cm (110 in)	260 cm (100 in)	(Romania) UVT Agroland Timișoara
13	Ana Bjelica (c)	3 April 1992	1.90 m (6 ft 3 in)	78 kg (172 lb)	310 cm (120 in)	305 cm (120 in)	(France) Volero Le Cannet
14	Maja Aleksić	6 June 1997	1.88 m (6 ft 2 in)	72 kg (159 lb)	302 cm (119 in)	289 cm (114 in)	(Romania) CSM Volei Alba Blaj
19	Bojana Milenković	6 March 1997	1.85 m (6 ft 1 in)	70 kg (150 lb)	294 cm (116 in)	288 cm (113 in)	(Italy) Scandicci
20	Jelena Blagojević	24 February 1988	1.81 m (5 ft 11 in)	67 kg (148 lb)	302 cm (119 in)	284 cm (112 in)	(Poland) Rzeszów
21	Jovana Kocić	24 February 1998	1.90 m (6 ft 3 in)	85 kg (187 lb)	290 cm (110 in)	285 cm (112 in)	(Serbia) OK Vizura
22	Sara Lozo	29 April 1997	1.86 m (6 ft 1 in)	61 kg (134 lb)	295 cm (116 in)	290 cm (110 in)	(Kazakhstan) Zhetyssu Almaty
23	Mila Đorđević	20 April 1998	1.80 m (5 ft 11 in)	58 kg (128 lb)	290 cm (110 in)	280 cm (110 in)	(Serbia) OK Crvena Zvezda
32	Bojana Gočanin	29 October 2002	1.79 m (5 ft 10 in)	66 kg (146 lb)	286 cm (113 in)	276 cm (109 in)	(Serbia) Takovo Zvezda Helios GM

== South Korea ==
The following is the Korean roster in the 2019 FIVB Volleyball Women's World Cup.

Head coach: (Italy) Stefano Lavarini

No.	Name	Date of birth	Height	Weight	Spike	Block	2018–19 club
1	Lee So-young	17 October 1994	1.76 m (5 ft 9 in)	68 kg (150 lb)	279 cm (110 in)	269 cm (106 in)	(South Korea) Seoul
3	Yeum Hye-seon	3 February 1991	1.77 m (5 ft 10 in)	65 kg (143 lb)	278 cm (109 in)	263 cm (104 in)	(South Korea) Daejeon
4	Kim Hee-jin	29 April 1991	1.86 m (6 ft 1 in)	75 kg (165 lb)	305 cm (120 in)	295 cm (116 in)	(South Korea) Hwaseong
5	Kim Hae-ran	16 March 1984	1.68 m (5 ft 6 in)	60 kg (130 lb)	270 cm (110 in)	250 cm (98 in)	(South Korea) Incheon
7	Ha Hye-jin	7 September 1996	1.81 m (5 ft 11 in)	60 kg (130 lb)	285 cm (112 in)	275 cm (108 in)	(South Korea) Gimcheon
8	Park Eun-jin	15 December 1999	1.87 m (6 ft 2 in)	74 kg (163 lb)	293 cm (115 in)	283 cm (111 in)	(South Korea) Daejeon
9	Oh Ji-young	11 July 1988	1.70 m (5 ft 7 in)	63 kg (139 lb)	267 cm (105 in)	247 cm (97 in)	(South Korea) Daejeon
10	Kim Yeon-koung (c)	26 February 1988	1.92 m (6 ft 4 in)	73 kg (161 lb)	330 cm (130 in)	320 cm (130 in)	(Turkey) Eczacıbaşı VitrA
11	Kim Su-ji	11 July 1987	1.87 m (6 ft 2 in)	68 kg (150 lb)	283 cm (111 in)	273 cm (107 in)	(South Korea) Hwaseong
13	Park Jeong-ah	26 March 1993	1.87 m (6 ft 2 in)	75 kg (165 lb)	300 cm (120 in)	290 cm (110 in)	(South Korea) Gimcheon
14	Yang Hyo-jin	14 December 1989	1.90 m (6 ft 3 in)	72 kg (159 lb)	340 cm (130 in)	338 cm (133 in)	(South Korea) Suwon
15	Kang So-hwi	18 July 1997	1.80 m (5 ft 11 in)	65 kg (143 lb)	286 cm (113 in)	276 cm (109 in)	(South Korea) Seoul
17	Lee Jae-yeong	15 October 1996	1.80 m (5 ft 11 in)	65 kg (143 lb)	289 cm (114 in)	279 cm (110 in)	(South Korea) Incheon
19	Lee Da-yeong	15 October 1996	1.80 m (5 ft 11 in)	63 kg (139 lb)	291 cm (115 in)	271 cm (107 in)	(South Korea) Suwon

== United States ==
The following is the American roster in the 2019 FIVB Volleyball Women's World Cup.

Head coach: Karch Kiraly

No.	Name	Date of birth	Height	Weight	Spike	Block	2019 club
2	Jordyn Poulter	31 July 1997	1.88 m (6 ft 2 in)	77 kg (170 lb)	306 cm (120 in)	296 cm (117 in)	(Italy) Chieri '76 Volleyball
4	Justine Wong-Orantes	6 October 1995	1.68 m (5 ft 6 in)	66 kg (146 lb)	282 cm (111 in)	277 cm (109 in)	(United States) National Team
6	TeTori Dixon	4 August 1992	1.91 m (6 ft 3 in)	83 kg (183 lb)	306 cm (120 in)	295 cm (116 in)	(China) Beijing
7	Lauren Carlini	28 February 1995	1.85 m (6 ft 1 in)	77 kg (170 lb)	302 cm (119 in)	295 cm (116 in)	(Italy) Igor Gorgonzola Novara
10	Jordan Larson (c)	16 October 1986	1.90 m (6 ft 3 in)	75 kg (165 lb)	302 cm (119 in)	295 cm (116 in)	(Turkey) Eczacıbaşı VitrA
11	Andrea Drews	25 December 1993	1.91 m (6 ft 3 in)	77 kg (170 lb)	316 cm (124 in)	312 cm (123 in)	(Turkey) Beylikdüzü
14	Michelle Bartsch-Hackley	12 February 1990	1.90 m (6 ft 3 in)	78 kg (172 lb)	305 cm (120 in)	296 cm (117 in)	(Italy) Igor Gorgonzola Novara
15	Kim Hill	30 November 1989	1.93 m (6 ft 4 in)	72 kg (159 lb)	320 cm (130 in)	310 cm (120 in)	(Italy) Imoco Volley
17	Megan Courtney	27 October 1993	1.85 m (6 ft 1 in)	61 kg (134 lb)	314 cm (124 in)	300 cm (120 in)	(Italy) Volley Bergamo
19	Hannah Tapp	21 June 1995	1.91 m (6 ft 3 in)	77 kg (170 lb)	297 cm (117 in)	290 cm (110 in)	(Italy) Volley Bergamo
22	Haleigh Washington	22 September 1995	1.90 m (6 ft 3 in)	82 kg (181 lb)	307 cm (121 in)	295 cm (116 in)	(Italy) Volley Millenium Brescia
23	Kelsey Robinson	25 June 1992	1.88 m (6 ft 2 in)	73 kg (161 lb)	307 cm (121 in)	298 cm (117 in)	(Turkey) Vakıfbank Istanbul
24	Chiaka Ogbogu	15 April 1995	1.88 m (6 ft 2 in)	73 kg (161 lb)	318 cm (125 in)	307 cm (121 in)	(Poland) KPS Chemik Police
25	Karsta Lowe	2 February 1993	1.96 m (6 ft 5 in)	75 kg (165 lb)	315 cm (124 in)	305 cm (120 in)	(Italy) Imoco Volley
