= 2019 Women's African Volleyball Championship =

Tournament details
- Host country: Egypt
- City: Cairo
- Dates: 9–14 July 2019
- Teams: 7
- Venue: 1 (in 1 host city)

Final positions
- Champions: Cameroon (2nd title)
- Runners-up: Kenya
- Third place: Senegal
- Fourth place: Egypt

Tournament statistics
- Matches played: 15

The 2019 Women's African Nations Championship was the 19th edition of the Women's African Volleyball Championship organised by Africa's governing volleyball body, the Confédération Africaine de Volleyball. Held in Cairo, Egypt, the tournament took place from 9 to 14 July 2019.

Cameroon won the championship defeating Kenya and Senegal won the bronze medal over Egypt.

== Competing nations ==
The following national teams have confirmed participation:

- Algeria
- Botswana
- Cameroon
- Egypt
- Kenya
- Morocco
- Senegal

== Venue ==
Cairo, Egypt	Cairo is located in Egypt
6 October Hall	Cairo is located in Egypt
Capacity: 500	Cairo is located in Egypt

== Format ==
The tournament is played in two stages. In the first stage, the participants are divided in two groups. A single round-robin format is played within each group to determine the teams' group position (as per procedure below).

The two best teams of each group progress to the second stage, the second stage of the tournament consists of a single-elimination, with winners advancing to the next round until the final round.

=== Pool standing procedure ===
1. Number of matches won
2. Match points
3. Sets ratio
4. Points ratio
5. Result of the last match between the tied teams

Match won 3–0 or 3–1: 3 match points for the winner, 0 match points for the loser
Match won 3–2: 2 match points for the winner, 1 match point for the loser

== Pools composition ==
The drawing of lots was held in Cairo, Egypt on 8 July.

Pool A	Pool B
Egypt	Cameroon
Senegal	Kenya
Morocco	Botswana
	Algeria

== Preliminary round ==
- All times are Central Africa Time (UTC+02:00).

=== Pool A ===
Pos	Team	Pld	W	L	Pts	SW	SL	SR	SPW	SPL	SPR	Qualification
1	Egypt	2	2	0	5	6	2	3.000	180	143	1.259	Championship round
2	Senegal	2	1	1	3	3	3	1.000	132	128	1.031	Championship round
3	Morocco	2	0	2	1	2	6	0.333	141	182	0.775	5th–7th classification

Date	Time		Score		Set 1	Set 2	Set 3	Set 4	Set 5	Total	Report
09 Jul	20:30	Egypt	3–0	Senegal	25–15	25–21	25–19			75–55	Result
10 Jul	20:00	Egypt	3–2	Morocco	25–16	21–25	25–13	19–25	15–9	105–88	Report
11 Jul	10:00	Morocco	0–3	Senegal	25–27	11–25	17–25			53–77	Result

=== Pool B ===
Pos	Team	Pld	W	L	Pts	SW	SL	SR	SPW	SPL	SPR	Qualification
1	Kenya	3	3	0	8	9	2	4.500	256	220	1.164	Championship round
2	Cameroon	3	2	1	7	8	3	2.667	265	195	1.359	Championship round
3	Algeria	3	1	2	3	3	7	0.429	206	228	0.904	5th–7th classification
4	Botswana	3	0	3	0	1	9	0.111	161	245	0.657	5th–7th classification

Date	Time		Score		Set 1	Set 2	Set 3	Set 4	Set 5	Total	Report
09 Jul	16:00	Botswana	0–3	Cameroon	12–25	17–25	10–25			39–75	Result
09 Jul	18:00	Kenya	3–0	Algeria	25–19	25–21	25–21			75–61	Result
10 Jul	16:00	Botswana	0–3	Kenya	16–25	18–25	11–25			45–75	Report
10 Jul	18:00	Cameroon	3–0	Algeria	25–21	25–5	26–24			76–50	Report
11 Jul	18:00	Algeria	3–1	Botswana	25–15	20–25	25–18	25–19		95–77	Result
11 Jul	20:00	Kenya	3–2	Cameroon	18–25	16–25	27–25	30–28	15–11	106–114	Result

== Final round ==
- All times are Central Africa Time (UTC+02:00).

=== 5th–7th classification ===
5th–7th play-off
13 July
Morocco	3
Botswana	2

5th place match
14 July
Morocco	0
Algeria	3

==== 5th–7th play-off ====
Date	Time		Score		Set 1	Set 2	Set 3	Set 4	Set 5	Total	Report
13 Jul	16:00	Morocco	3–2	Botswana	23–25	25–23	25–16	24–26	16–14	113–104	Report

==== 5th place match ====
Date	Time		Score		Set 1	Set 2	Set 3	Set 4	Set 5	Total	Report
14 Jul	16:00	Morocco	0–3	Algeria	23–25	14–25	20–25			57–75	Result

=== Championship round ===
Semifinals
13 July
Egypt	0
Cameroon	3
13 July
Kenya	3
Senegal	0

Final
14 July
Cameroon	3
Kenya	2
3rd place match
14 July
Egypt	1
Senegal	3

==== Semifinals ====
Date	Time		Score		Set 1	Set 2	Set 3	Set 4	Set 5	Total	Report
13 Jul	19:00	Egypt	0–3	Cameroon	23–25	21–25	18–25			62–75	Report
13 Jul	21:00	Kenya	3–0	Senegal	25–13	25–13	25–20			75–46	Report

==== 3rd place match ====
Date	Time		Score		Set 1	Set 2	Set 3	Set 4	Set 5	Total	Report
14 Jul	18:00	Egypt	1–3	Senegal	17–25	17–25	25–14	26–28		85–92	Result

==== Final ====
Date	Time		Score		Set 1	Set 2	Set 3	Set 4	Set 5	Total	Report
14 Jul	20:00	Cameroon	3–2	Kenya	25–17	25–27	25–23	23–25	16–14	114–106	Result

== Final standing ==
Rank	Team
1st place, gold medalist(s)	Cameroon
2nd place, silver medalist(s)	Kenya
3rd place, bronze medalist(s)	Senegal
4	Egypt
5	Algeria
6	Morocco
7	Botswana

2019 Women's African Volleyball Championship

Cameroon
2nd title

13–woman squad
Stéphanie Fotso Mogoung, Christelle Nana Tchoudjang, Raïssa Nasser, Laetitia Moma Bassoko, Henriette Koulla, Honorine Djakao Gamkoua, Berthrade Bikatal, Fawziya Abdoulkarim, Yolande Amana Guigolo, Emelda Piata Zessi, Odile Leopoldine Adiana Estelle, Ahirindi Menkreo Odette, Ruth Manuela Marie Bibinbe
Head coach
Jean-René Akono

== See also ==
- 2019 Men's African Volleyball Championship
