= 2022 FIVB Women's Volleyball World Championship squads =

This article shows the 14-player roster of all participating teams at the 2022 FIVB Women's Volleyball World Championship.

== Pool A ==
=== Belgium ===
The following is Belgium's roster for the 2022 FIVB Women's Volleyball World Championship.

Head Coach: (Belgium) Gert Vande Broek

- 2 Elise Van Sas S
- 3 Britt Herbots OH
- 4 Nathalie Lemmens MB
- 5 Jodie Guilliams OH
- 7 Celine Van Gestel OH
- 9 Nel Demeyer L
- 10 Pauline Martin O
- 12 Charlotte Krenicky S
- 13 Marlies Janssens MB
- 15 Jutta Van de Vyver S
- 18 Britt Rampelberg L
- 19 Silke Van Avermaet MB
- 21 Manon Stragier OH
- 22 Anna Koulberg MB

=== Cameroon ===
The following is Cameroon's roster for the 2022 FIVB Women's Volleyball World Championship.

Head Coach: (Cameroon) Jean-René Akono

- 1 Baran Kuong Sourea MB
- 2 Bediang Mpon Rodrigue OH
- 3 Magalie Mbengono Mengue MB
- 5 Paule Arielle Olomo MB
- 7 Reine Ngameni Mbopda Davina L
- 8 Emmanuela Grâce Bikatal S
- 9 Brandy Gatcheu Djeutchoko OH
- 10 Simone Flore Bikatal O
- 12 Carine Blamdai MB
- 13 Michelle Wete Sissako OH
- 14 Yolande Amana Guigolo S
- 15 Emelda Piata Zessi MB
- 16 Estelle Adiana O
- 18 Oceane Guebon Abouem L

=== Italy ===
The following is Italy's roster for the 2022 FIVB Women's Volleyball World Championship.

Head Coach: (Italy) Davide Mazzanti

- 1 Marina Lubian MB
- 3 Alessia Gennari OH
- 4 Sara Bonifacio MB
- 5 Ofelia Malinov S
- 6 Monica De Gennaro L
- 7 Eleonora Fersino L
- 8 Alessia Orro S
- 9 Caterina Bosetti OH
- 10 Cristina Chirichella MB
- 11 Anna Danesi MB
- 14 Elena Pietrini OH
- 15 Sylvia Nwakalor O
- 17 Miriam Sylla OH
- 18 Paola Egonu O

=== Kenya ===
The following is Kenya's roster for the 2022 FIVB Women's Volleyball World Championship.

Head Coach: (Brazil) Luizomar de Moura

- 1 Veronica Kilabat S
- 2 Veronica Oluoch OH
- 3 Violet Makuto O
- 5 Sharon Chepchumba O
- 6 Belinda Barasa MB
- 7 Emmaculate Nekesa S
- 10 Noel Murambi OH
- 12 Gladys Ekaru MB
- 13 Yvonne Wavinya L
- 14 Mercy Moim OH
- 15 Lorine Chebet MB
- 16 Agripina Kundu L
- 19 Edith Mukuvilani MB
- 20 Sande Meldinah Nemali OH

=== Netherlands ===
The following is Netherlands's roster for the 2022 FIVB Women's Volleyball World Championship.

Head Coach: (Netherlands) Avital Selinger

- 2 Fleur Savelkoel OH
- 4 Celeste Plak O
- 5 Jolien Knollema OH
- 7 Juliet Lohuis MB
- 9 Myrthe Schoot L
- 11 Anne Buijs OH
- 12 Britt Bongaerts S
- 14 Laura Dijkema S
- 18 Marrit Jasper OH
- 19 Nika Daalderop OH
- 20 Tessa Polder MB
- 23 Eline Timmerman MB
- 25 Florien Reesink L
- 26 Elles Dambrink O

=== Puerto Rico ===
The following is Puerto Rico's roster for the 2022 FIVB Women's Volleyball World Championship.

Head Coach: (Puerto Rico) Fernando Morales

- 2 Shara Venegas L
- 4 Raymariely Santos S
- 7 Stephanie Enright OH
- 8 Paola Rojas MB
- 9 Jennifer Nogueras S
- 10 Diana Reyes MB
- 11 Brittany Abercrombie O
- 12 Neira Ortiz MB
- 14 Natalia Valentín S
- 15 Génesis Collazo O
- 16 Alba Hernández MB
- 21 Pilar Marie Victoria OH
- 22 Karina Ocasio OH
- 23 Nomaris Vélez L

== Pool B ==
=== Croatia ===
The following is Croatia's roster for the 2022 FIVB Women's Volleyball World Championship.

Head Coach: (Turkey) Ferhat Akbas

- 2 Mika Grbavica O
- 3 Ema Strunjak MB
- 4 Božana Butigan MB
- 6 Klara Perić S
- 7 Laura Miloš OH
- 9 Lucija Mlinar OH
- 10 Dijana Karatović OH
- 11 Beta Dumančić MB
- 12 Josipa Marković L
- 13 Samanta Fabris O
- 14 Martina Šamadan MB
- 16 Lea Deak S
- 19 Izabela Štimac L
- 20 Natalia Tomić OH

=== Dominican Republic ===
The following is Dominican Republic's roster for the 2022 FIVB Women's Volleyball World Championship.

Head Coach: (Brazil) Marcos Kwiek

- 2 Yaneirys Rodríguez L
- 5 Brenda Castillo L
- 6 Camil Domínguez S
- 7 Niverka Marte S
- 8 Cándida Arias MB
- 9 Angélica Hinojosa MB
- 15 Madeline Guillén OH
- 16 Yonkaira Peña OH
- 18 Bethania de la Cruz OH
- 20 Brayelin Martínez OH
- 21 Jineiry Martínez MB
- 23 Gaila González O
- 24 Geraldine González MB
- 25 Larysmer Martínez OH

=== Poland ===
The following is Poland's roster for the 2022 FIVB Women's Volleyball World Championship.

Head Coach: (Italy) Stefano Lavarini

- 1 Maria Stenzel L
- 2 Anna Obiała MB
- 3 Klaudia Alagierska MB
- 5 Agnieszka Korneluk MB
- 6 Kamila Witkowska MB
- 7 Monika Galkowska O
- 8 Zuzanna Górecka OH
- 9 Magdalena Stysiak O
- 10 Monika Fedusio OH
- 12 Aleksandra Szczygłowska L
- 14 Joanna Wołosz S
- 22 Weronika Szlagowska OH
- 26 Katarzyna Wenerska S
- 30 Olivia Różański OH

=== South Korea ===
The following is South Korea's roster for the 2022 FIVB Women's Volleyball World Championship.

Head Coach: (Spain) Cesar Hernández González

- 1 Han Soo-ji MB
- 3 Yeum Hye-seon S
- 4 Han Da-hye L
- 5 Kim Ha Kyung S
- 8 Kim Yeong-yeon L
- 9 Lee Ju-Ah MB
- 11 Park Hye-min OH
- 12 Lee Da-hyeon MB
- 13 Park Jeong-ah OH
- 15 Lee Seon-woo OH
- 17 Ha Hye-jin O
- 18 Hwang Min-kyoung OH
- 19 Pyo Seung-ju OH
- 20 Yoo Seo-yeun OH

=== Thailand ===
The following is Thailand's roster for the 2022 FIVB Women's Volleyball World Championship.

Head Coach: (Thailand) Danai Sriwatcharamethakul

- 2 Piyanut Pannoy L
- 3 Pornpun Guedpard S
- 5 Thatdao Nuekjang MB
- 9 Nuttaporn Sanitklang L
- 11 Khatthalee Pinsuwan OH
- 12 Hattaya Bamrungsuk MB
- 13 Natthanicha Jaisaen S
- 14 Thanacha Sooksod O
- 16 Pimpichaya Kokram O
- 17 Sasipapron Janthawisut OH
- 18 Ajcharaporn Kongyot OH
- 19 Chatchu-On Moksri OH
- 22 Watchareeya Nuanjam MB
- 24 Tichakorn Boonlert MB

=== Turkey ===
The following is Turkey's roster for the 2022 FIVB Women's Volleyball World Championship.

Head Coach: (Italy) Giovanni Guidetti

- 2 Simge Şebnem Aköz L
- 3 Cansu Özbay S
- 6 Saliha Şahin OH
- 7 Hande Baladın OH
- 9 Meliha İsmailoğlu OH
- 12 Elif Şahin S
- 13 Meryem Boz O
- 14 Eda Erdem Dündar MB
- 15 Ayçin Akyol MB
- 17 Derya Cebecioğlu OH
- 18 Zehra Güneş MB
- 20 Aylin Sarıoğlu L
- 22 İlkin Aydın OH
- 99 Ebrar Karakurt O

== Pool C ==
=== Bulgaria ===
The following is Bulgaria's roster for the 2022 FIVB Women's Volleyball World Championship.

Head Coach: (Italy) Lorenzo Micelli

- 1 Gergana Dimitrova OH
- 2 Nasya Dimitrova MB
- 4 Elena Becheva OH
- 5 Maria Yordanova OH
- 6 Miroslava Paskova OH
- 7 Lora Kitipova S
- 8 Petya Barakova S
- 9 Borislava Saykova MB
- 10 Mira Todorova MB
- 13 Mila Pashkuleva L
- 16 Elitsa Atanasijević OH
- 17 Radostina Marinova O
- 18 Silvana Chausheva O
- 28 Mariya Krivoshiyska MB

=== Canada ===
The following is Canada's roster for the 2022 FIVB Women's Volleyball World Championship.

Head Coach: (Canada) Shannon Winzer

- 3 Kiera Van Ryk OH
- 4 Vicky Savard OH
- 5 Julia Murmann L
- 6 Jazmine Ruth White MB
- 8 Alicia Ogoms MB
- 9 Alexa Gray OH
- 11 Andrea Mitrović OH
- 12 Jennifer Cross MB
- 13 Brie King S
- 14 Hilary Howe OH
- 16 Caroline Livingston OH
- 18 Kim Robitaille S
- 19 Emily Maglio MB
- 20 Arielle Palermo L

=== Germany ===
The following is Germany's roster for the 2022 FIVB Women's Volleyball World Championship.

Head Coach: (Belgium) Vital Heynen

- 2 Pia Kästner S
- 4 Anna Pogany L
- 5 Corina Glaab S
- 6 Jennifer Janiska OH
- 8 Kimberly Drewniok O
- 9 Lina Alsmeier OH
- 10 Lena Stigrot OH
- 12 Hanna Orthmann OH
- 13 Saskia Hippe O
- 14 Marie Schölzel MB
- 15 Elisa Lohmann L
- 17 Laura Emonts OH
- 21 Camilla Weitzel MB
- 22 Monique Strubbe MB

=== Kazakhstan ===
The following is Kazakhstan's roster for the 2022 FIVB Women's Volleyball World Championship.

Head Coach: (Kazakhstan) Darko Dobreskov

- 3 Yana Petrenko MB
- 4 Ekaterina Mikhailova OH
- 9 Valeriya Chumak MB
- 11 Yelizaveta Meister S
- 12 Sabira Bekisheva L
- 15 Madina Beket L
- 16 Tatyana Nikitina O
- 17 Margarita Belchenko OH
- 19 Anastassiya Kolomoyets MB
- 21 Tomiris Sagimbayeva OH
- 25 Nailya Nigmatulina S
- 27 Natalya Smirnova MB
- 29 Kristina Belova O
- 99 Dinara Kozhanberdina S

=== Serbia ===
The following is Serbia's roster for the 2022 FIVB Women's Volleyball World Championship.

Head Coach: (Italy) Daniele Santarelli

- 1 Bianka Buša OH
- 2 Katarina Lazović OH
- 4 Bojana Drča S
- 5 Mina Popović MB
- 8 Slađana Mirković S
- 9 Brankica Mihajlović OH
- 12 Teodora Pušić L
- 13 Ana Bjelica O
- 14 Maja Aleksić MB
- 15 Jovana Stevanović MB
- 16 Aleksandra Jegdić L
- 18 Tijana Bošković O
- 19 Bojana Milenković OH
- 22 Sara Lozo OH

=== United States ===
The following is United States' roster for the 2022 FIVB Women's Volleyball World Championship.

Head Coach: (United States) Karch Kiraly

- 2 Jordyn Poulter S
- 4 Justine Wong-Orantes L
- 5 Morgan Hentz L
- 7 Lauren Carlini S
- 8 Hannah Tapp MB
- 11 Annie Drews O
- 13 Sarah Wilhite Parsons OH
- 15 Haleigh Washington MB
- 18 Kara Bajema OH
- 20 Danielle Cuttino O
- 23 Kelsey Robinson OH
- 24 Chiaka Ogbogu MB
- 30 Ali Frantti OH
- 31 Anna Hall MB

== Pool D ==
=== Argentina ===
The following is Argentina's roster for the 2022 FIVB Women's Volleyball World Championship.

Head Coach: (Argentina) Hernán Ferraro

- 2 Sabrina Germanier S
- 3 Paula Nizetich OH
- 4 Daniela Simian Bulaich OH
- 5 Candelaria Salinas OH
- 6 Lucia Verdier OH
- 7 Erika Mercado O
- 9 Bianca Cugno O
- 10 Emilce Sosa MB
- 12 Tatiana Rizzo L
- 13 Bianca Farriol MB
- 14 Victoria Mayer S
- 17 Candelaria Herrera MB
- 19 Brenda Graff MB
- 20 Agostina Pelozo L

=== Brazil ===
The following is Brazil's roster for the 2022 FIVB Women's Volleyball World Championship.

Head Coach: (Brazil) José Roberto Guimarães

- 2 Carol Gattaz MB
- 3 Júlia Kudiess MB
- 4 Ana Carolina da Silva MB
- 5 Priscila Daroit OH
- 6 Nyeme Costa L
- 7 Rosamaria Montibeller OH
- 8 Macris Carneiro S
- 9 Roberta Ratzke S
- 10 Gabriela Guimarães OH
- 14 Natália Araujo L
- 15 Lorena Viezel MB
- 16 Kisy Nascimento O
- 19 Tainara Santos OH
- 24 Lorenne Teixeira O

=== China ===
The following is China's roster for the 2022 FIVB Women's Volleyball World Championship.

Head Coach: (China) Cai Bin

- 1 Yuan Xinyue MB
- 3 Diao Linyu S
- 4 Yang Hanyu MB
- 5 Gao Yi MB
- 6 Gong Xiangyu O
- 7 Wang Yuanyuan MB
- 8 Jin Ye OH
- 10 Wang Yunlu OH
- 11 Wang Yizhu OH
- 12 Li Yingying OH
- 15 Wang Weiyi L
- 16 Ding Xia S
- 18 Wang Mengjie L
- 19 Chen Peiyan O

=== Colombia ===
The following is Colombia's roster for the 2022 FIVB Women's Volleyball World Championship.

Head Coach: (Brazil) Antonio Rizola

- 1 Darlevis Mosquera MB
- 2 Yeisy Soto MB
- 3 Dayana Segovia O
- 5 Ana Karina Olaya OH
- 6 Valerin Carabalí MB
- 7 Madelaynne Montaño O
- 9 Laura Pascua OH
- 10 Juliana Toro L
- 13 Camila Gómez L
- 14 Angie Velásquez S
- 15 María Alejandra Marín S
- 16 Melissa Rangel MB
- 19 María Margarita Martínez OH
- 20 Amanda Coneo OH

=== Czech Republic ===
The following is Czech Republic's roster for the 2022 FIVB Women's Volleyball World Championship.

Head Coach: (Greece) Giannis Athanasopoulos

- 1 Andrea Kossányiová OH
- 2 Eva Hodanová O
- 4 Gabriela Orvošová O
- 8 Ela Koulisiani MB
- 9 Daniela Digrinová L
- 10 Kateřina Valková S
- 11 Veronika Dostálová L
- 13 Denisa Pavlíková OH
- 16 Michaela Mlejnková OH
- 17 Klára Faltínová OH
- 18 Pavlina Šimáňová MB
- 19 Petra Kojdová OH
- 23 Simona Bajusz S
- 26 Lucie Blazková MB

=== Japan ===
The following is Japan's roster for the 2022 FIVB Women's Volleyball World Championship.

Head Coach: (Japan) Masayoshi Manabe

- 2 Mami Uchiseto L
- 3 Sarina Koga OH
- 4 Mayu Ishikawa OH
- 5 Haruyo Shimamura MB
- 10 Arisa Inoue OH
- 12 Aki Momii S
- 15 Kotona Hayashi OH
- 19 Nichika Yamada MB
- 22 Satomi Fukudome L
- 23 Mami Yotoka MB
- 26 Airi Miyabe OH
- 30 Nanami Seki S
- 37 Ameze Miyabe OH
- 38 Yoshino Sato OH

== See also ==
- 2022 FIVB Volleyball Men's World Championship squads
