= Jean Akono =

Jean Akono may refer to

- Jean René Akono (born 1976), Cameroonian volleyball player
- Jean-Paul Akono (born 1952), Cameroonian football player
