= Marrit Jasper =

Dutch volleyball player (born 1996)

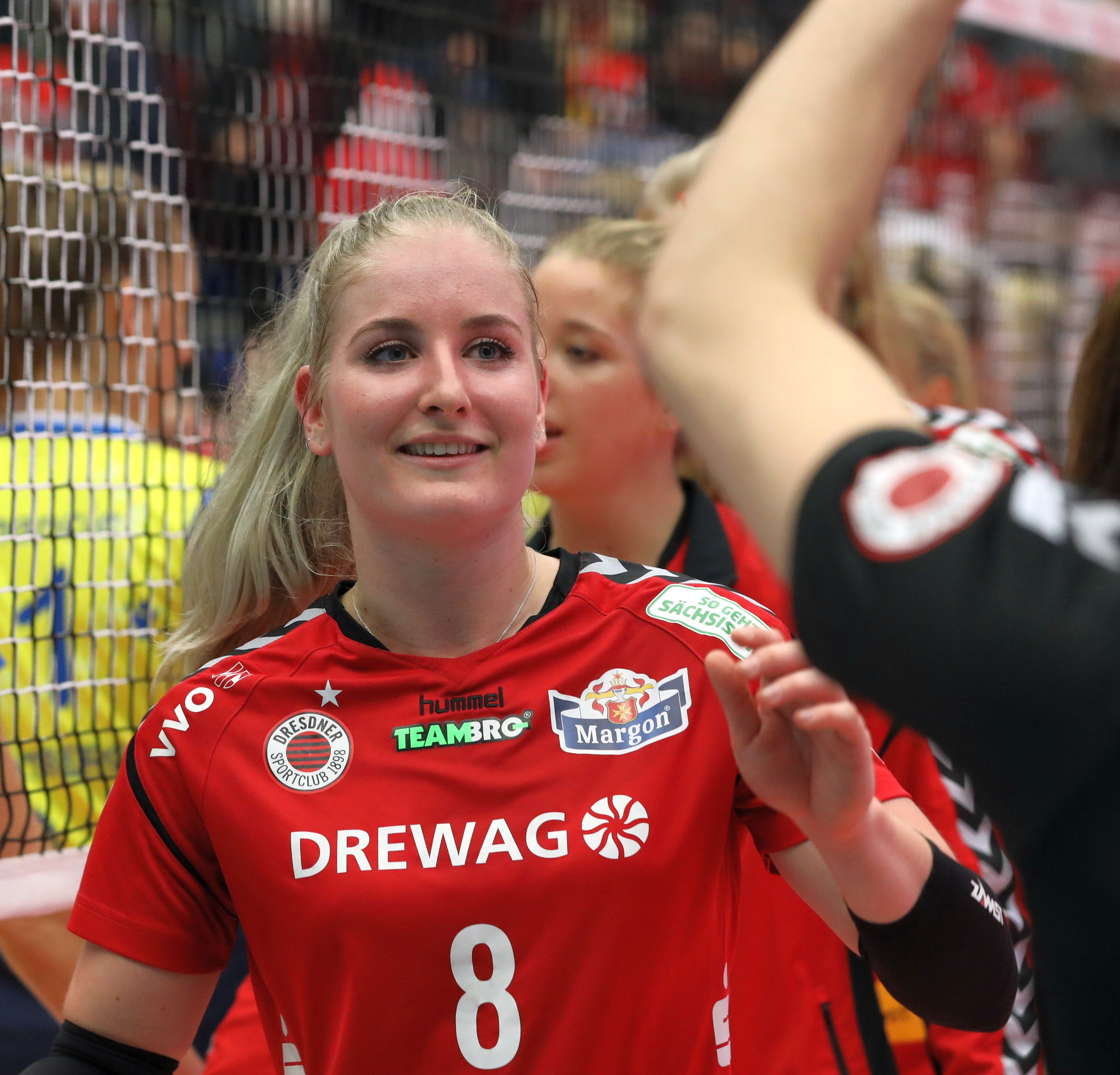

Personal information
- Nationality: Dutch
- Born: 28 February 1996 (age 30) Sneek, Netherlands
- Height: 1.80 m (5 ft 11 in)
- Weight: 75 kg (165 lb)
- Spike: 300 cm (118 in)
- Block: 285 cm (112 in)

Volleyball information
- Position: Outside-spiker
- Current club: Volley-Ball Nantes
- Number: 18

National team
- Years: Team
- Netherlands
Honours
European Championship
Silver medal – second place	2017 Azerbaijan/Georgia
Bronze medal – third place	2023 Belgium/Estonia/Germany/Italy

Marrit Jasper (born 28 February 1996) is a Dutch volleyball player for Volley-Ball Nantes and the Dutch national team.

She participated at the 2017 Women's European Volleyball Championship.
