= Madeleine Bodo Essissima =

Cameroonian volleyball player (born 1992)

Madeleine Bodo Essissima (born April 29, 1992) is a Cameroonian volleyball player. She was a member of the Cameroon women's national volleyball team at the 2016 Summer Olympics.
