= Théorine Aboa Mbeza =

Cameroonian volleyball player (born 1992)

Théorine Christelle Aboa Mbeza (born August 25, 1992) is a Cameroonian volleyball player. She was a member of the Cameroon women's national volleyball team at the 2016 Summer Olympics.

She won the gold medal at the 2017 African Women's Volleyball Championship. She then participated with her team in the 2018 Women's World Volleyball Championship. She won the gold medal at the African Women's Volleyball Championship 2021.
