= Yeum Hye-seon =

South Korean volleyball player (born 1991)

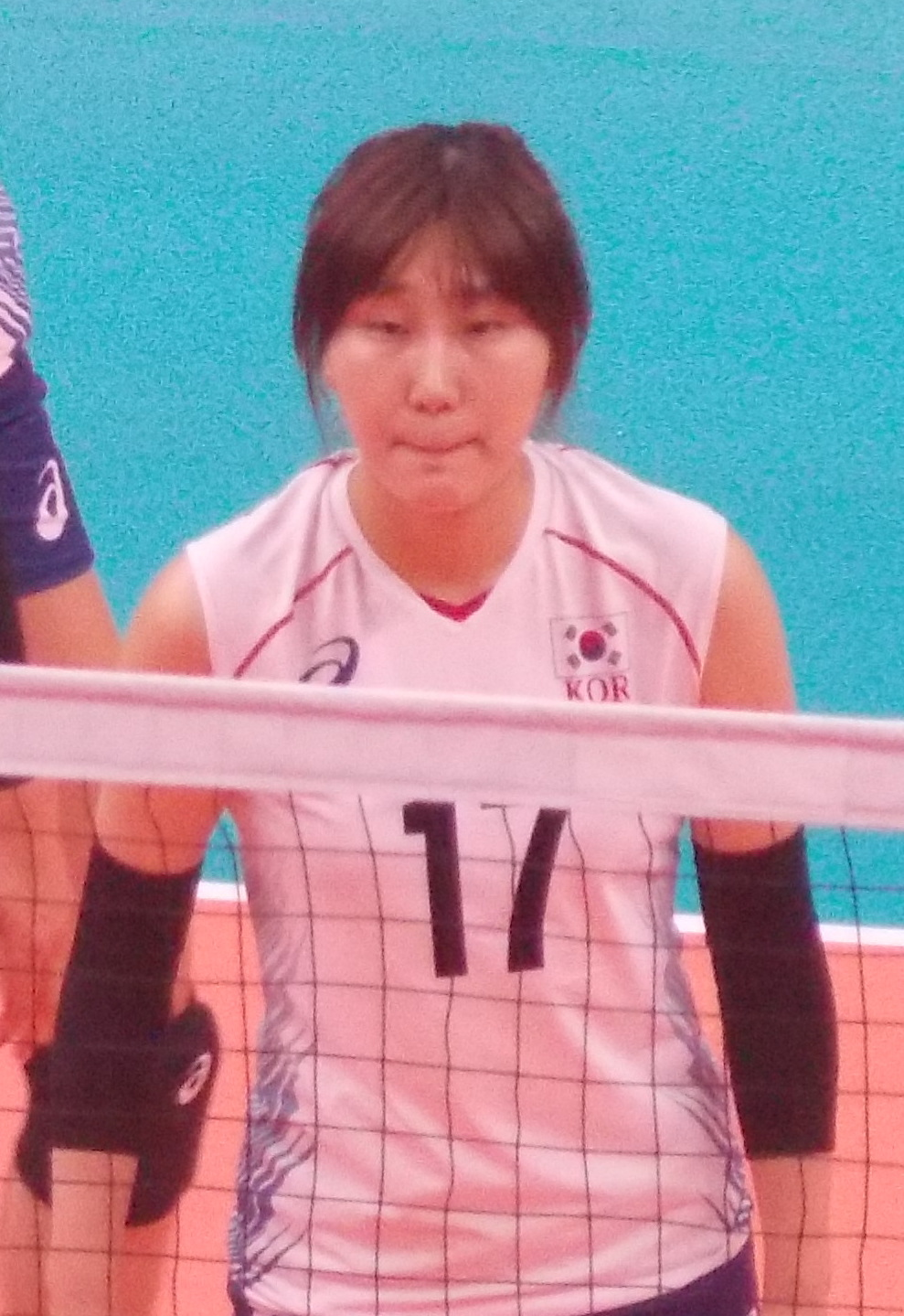
- Yeum at the 2016 Summer Olympics

Personal information
- Born: 3 February 1991 (age 35) Mokpo, Jeollanam-do, South Korea
- Height: 177 cm (70 in)
- Weight: 65 kg (143 lb)
- Spike: 278 cm (109 in)
- Block: 263 cm (104 in)

Volleyball information
- Position: Setter
- Number: 3 (national team)

Career
- Years: Team
- 2008–2017: Suwon Hyundai Hillstate
- 2017–2019: Hwaseong IBK Altos
- 2019–: Daejeon KGC

National team
- Years: Team
- 2014–: South Korea

Korean name
- Hangul: 염혜선
- Hanja: 廉惠善
- RR: Yeom Hyeseon
- MR: Yŏm Hyesŏn

Yeum Hye-seon (Korean: 염혜선; born 3 February 1991) is a South Korean volleyball player. She was part of the South Korea women's national volleyball team at the 2016 Summer Olympics and 2020 Summer Olympics. She was selected as the "Best Setter" in the 2020 Olympics. Her team finished in fifth place in the 2016 Olympics and fourth in the 2020 Olympics.

She participated in the 2014 FIVB Volleyball World Grand Prix. On club level she has played for Daejeon KGC since 2019.
