= Victoire L'or Ngon Ntame =

Cameroonian volleyball player (born 1985)

Personal information
- Nationality: Cameroon
- Born: 31 December 1985 (age 40)
- Height: 1.77 m (5 ft 10 in)
- Weight: 79 kg (174 lb)
- Spike: 288 cm (113 in)
- Block: 272 cm (107 in)

Volleyball information
- Number: 11

Career
- Years: Team
- 2014: (Cameroon) INJS Yaoundé

Victoire Pauline L'or Ngon Ntame (born 31 December 1985) is a Cameroonian volleyball player. She is a member of the Cameroon women's national volleyball team and played for INJS Yaoundé in 2014.

She was part of the Cameroonian national team at the 2014 FIVB Volleyball Women's World Championship in Italy, and the 2016 Summer Olympics.

== Clubs ==
- (Cameroon) INJS Yaoundé (2014)
