= Myrthe Schoot =

Dutch volleyball player

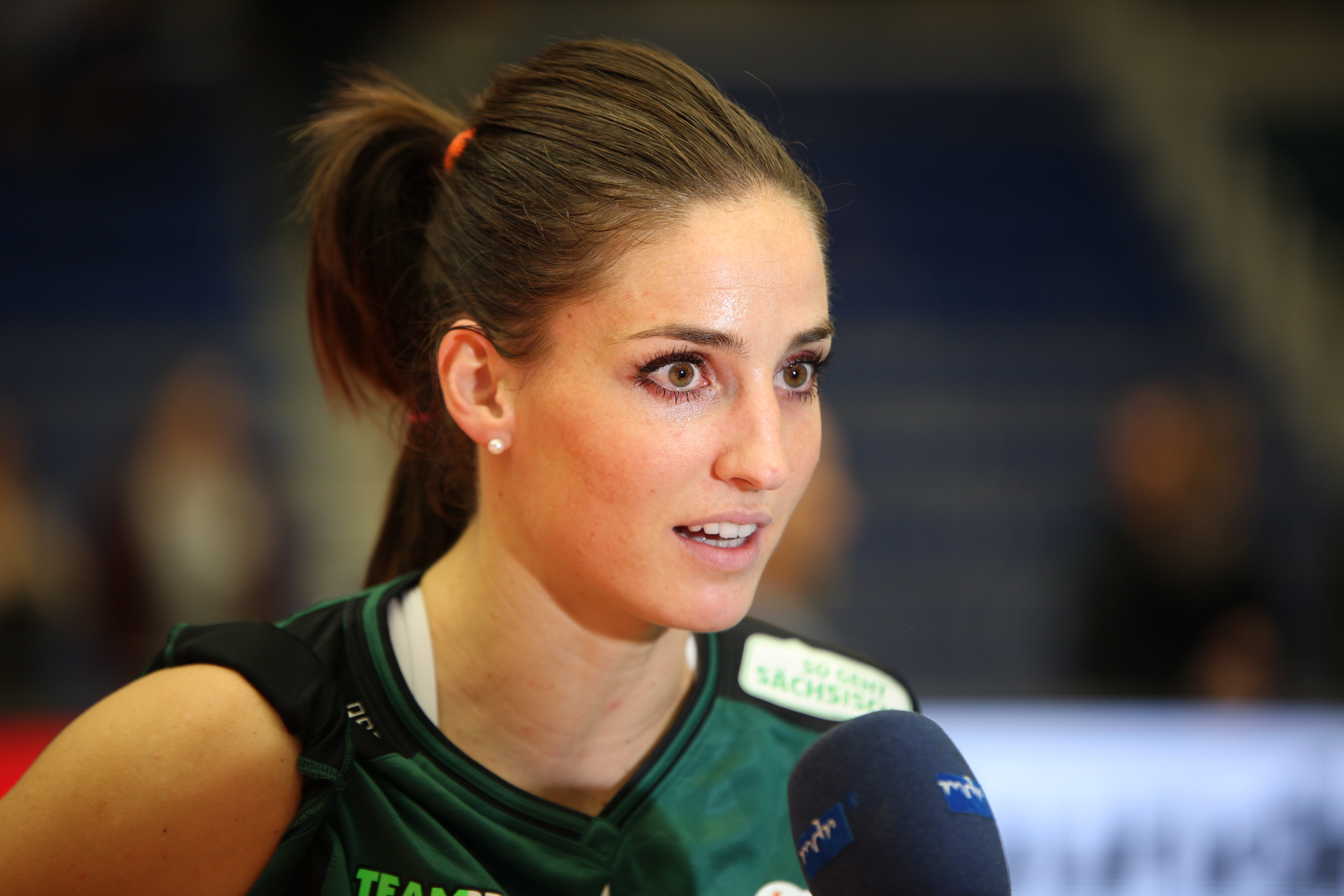
- Schoot in 2016

Personal information
- Full name: Myrthe Mathilde Schoot
- Nationality: Dutch
- Born: 29 August 1988 (age 38); Winterswijk, Netherlands
- Height: 1.84 m (6 ft 0 in)
- Weight: 69 kg (152 lb)
- Spike: 298 cm (117 in)
- Block: 286 cm (113 in)

Volleyball information
- Position: Libero
- Current club: Dresdner SC
- Number: 9

Career
Years	Teams
2004–2005; 2005–2006; 2006–2008; 2008–2009; 2009–2011; 2011–2012; 2012–	Udense Saturnus; VC Weert; Longa '59 Lichtenvoorde; Martinus Amstelveen; TVC Amstelveen; Rote Raben Vilsbiburg; Dresdner SC

National team
Netherlands
Honours
Women's volleyball
Representing the Netherlands
World Grand Prix
Bronze medal – third place	2016 Bangkok
European Championship
Silver medal – second place	2015 Belgium/Netherlands
Silver medal – second place	2017 Azerbaijan/Georgia

Myrthe Mathilde Schoot (born 29 August 1988) is a retired Dutch volleyball player, who played as a libero. She was a member of the Women's National Team and competed at the 2016 Summer Olympics in Rio de Janeiro.

== Career ==
In June 2009, Myrthe Schoot made her debut in the national team in the match against Japan at the Montreux Volley Masters. She participated in the 2016 FIVB World Grand Prix, 2017 FIVB World Grand Prix. and 2018 FIVB Volleyball Women's Nations League. She played for Dresdner SC.
