= Henriette Koulla =

Cameroonian volleyball player (born 1992)

Personal information
- Nationality: Cameroon
- Born: 14 September 1992 (age 34)
- Height: 1.69 m (5 ft 7 in)
- Weight: 60 kg (130 lb)
- Spike: 275 cm (108 in)
- Block: 262 cm (103 in)

Volleyball information
- Number: 7

Career
Years	Teams
2014	(Cameroon) INJS Yaoundé

Henriette Koulla (born 14 September 1992) is a Cameroonian volleyball player. She is a member of the Cameroon women's national volleyball team and played for INJS Yaoundé in 2014. She was part of the Cameroonian national team at the 2014 FIVB Volleyball Women's World Championship in Italy. and 2018 FIVB Volleyball Women's World Championship.

== Clubs ==
- (Cameroon) INJS Yaoundé (2014)
- ŽOK Gacko 2017/18
