= Raïssa Nasser =

Cameroonian volleyball player (born 1994)

Raïssa Nasser (born August 19, 1994) is a Cameroonian volleyball player. She was a member of the Cameroon women's national volleyball team at the 2016 Summer Olympics.
