= Christelle Tchoudjang Nana =

Cameroonian volleyball player (born 1989)

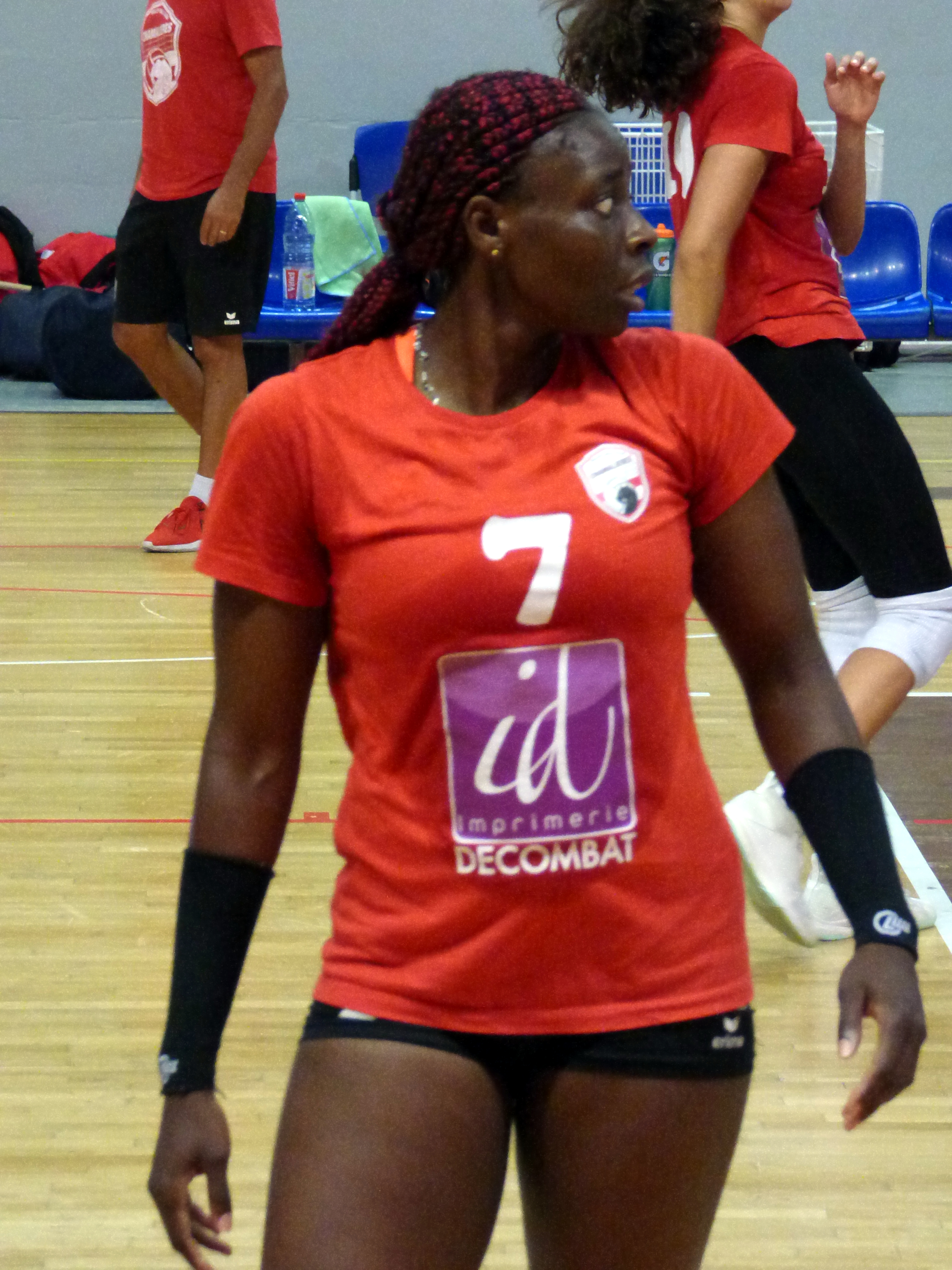

Personal information
- Nationality: Cameroon
- Born: 7 July 1989 (age 37)
- Height: 1.84 m (6 ft 0 in)
- Weight: 80 kg (180 lb)
- Spike: 295 cm (116 in)
- Block: 260 cm (100 in)

Volleyball information
- Number: 2

Career
Years	Teams
2014	(France) VBC Chamalières

Christelle Tchoudjang Nana (born 7 July 1989) is a Cameroonian volleyball player.

She is a member of the Cameroon women's national volleyball team and played for VBC Chamalières in 2014. She was part of the Cameroonian national team at the 2014 FIVB Volleyball Women's World Championship in Italy.

== Clubs ==
- (France) VBC Chamalières (2014)
