= Laetitia Moma Bassoko =

Cameroonian volleyball player (born 1993)

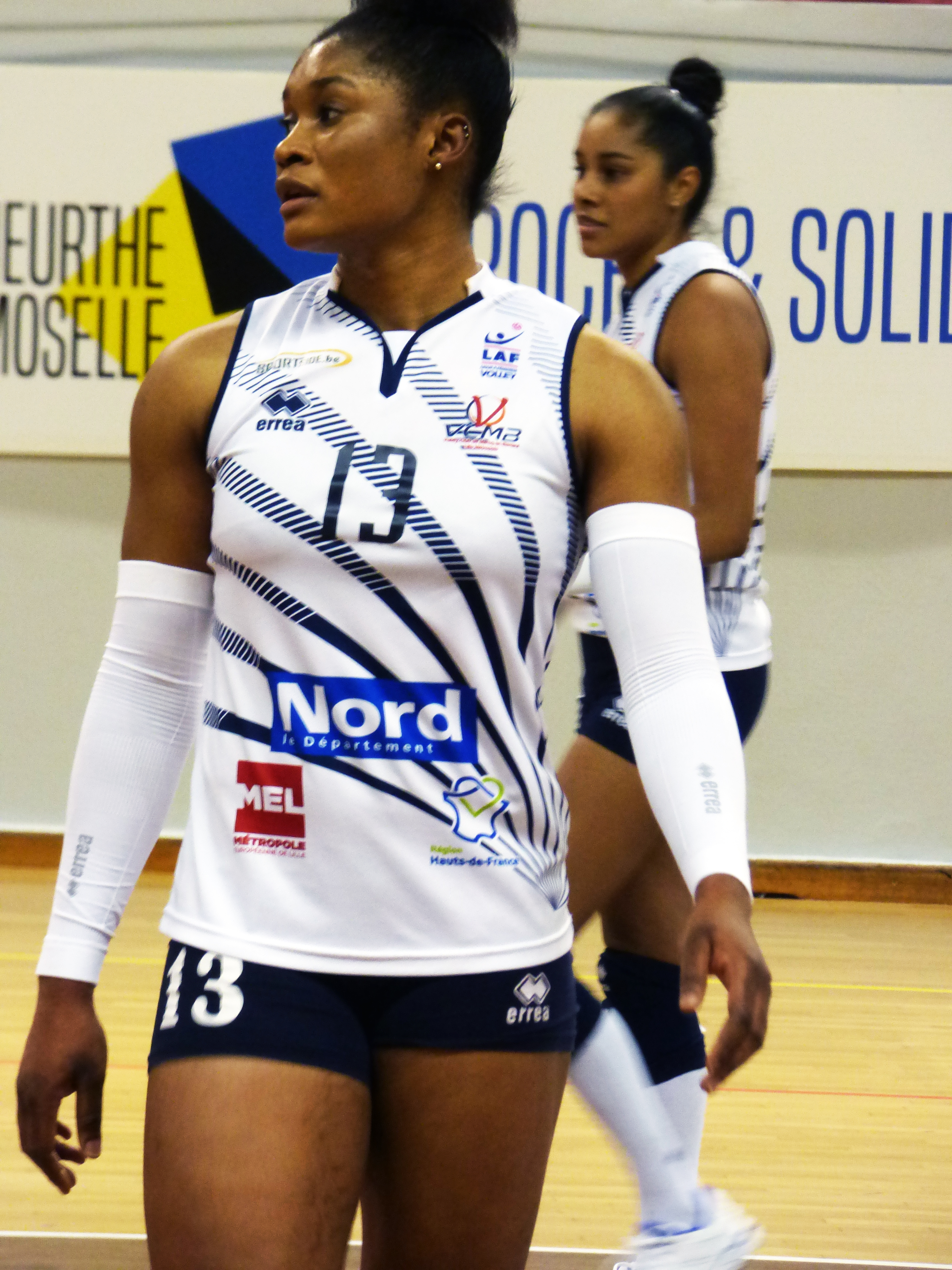

Personal information
- Nationality: Cameroon
- Born: 9 October 1993 (age 33)
- Height: 1.84 m (6 ft 0 in)
- Weight: 81 kg (179 lb)
- Spike: 312 cm (123 in)
- Block: 287 cm (113 in)

Volleyball information
- Number: 99

Career
Years	Teams
2014	(France) VBC Chamalières
2015	(France) Stella ES Calais
2021	(South Korea) GS Caltex Seoul KIXX (2021-2023)
2023	(South Korea) Suwon Hyundai Engineering & Construction Hillstate

Laetitia Moma Bassoko (born 9 October 1993) is a Cameroonian volleyball player. She is a member of the Cameroon women's national volleyball team.

She was playing for VBC Chamalières in 2014 and was part of the Cameroonian national team at the 2014 FIVB Volleyball Women's World Championship in Italy and at the 2016 Olympic Games in Rio de Janeiro.

== Clubs ==
- (France) VBC Chamalières (2014)
- (France) Stella ES Calais (2015–2016)
- (South Korea) GS Caltex Seoul KIXX (2021-2023)
- (Vietnam) Hóa chất Đức Giang Hà Nội (2022)
- (South Korea) Suwon Hyundai Engineering & Construction Hillstate (2023-)
