= Stéphanie Fotso Mogoung =

Cameroonian volleyball player (born 1987)

Personal information
- Nationality: Cameroon
- Born: 25 September 1987 (age 39)
- Height: 1.87 m (6 ft 2 in)
- Weight: 78 kg (172 lb)
- Spike: 296 cm (117 in)
- Block: 259 cm (102 in)

Volleyball information
- Number: 1

Career
Years	Teams
2014	(France) VBC Chamalières

Stéphanie Fotso Mogoung (born 25 September 1987) is a Cameroonian volleyball player. She is a member of the Cameroon women's national volleyball team and played for VBC Chamalières in 2014.

She was part of the Cameroonian national team at the 2014 FIVB Volleyball Women's World Championship in Italy and at the 2016 Olympic Games in Rio de Janeiro.

== Clubs ==
- (France) VBC Chamalières (2014)
