= Fawziya Abdoulkarim =

Cameroonian volleyball player

Personal information
- Nickname: Fafa
- Nationality: Cameroon
- Born: 1 March 1989 (age 37)
- Height: 1.81 m (5 ft 11 in)
- Weight: 64 kg (141 lb)
- Spike: 292 cm (115 in)
- Block: 287 cm (113 in)

Volleyball information
- Current club: (France) Volley-Ball Pays Viennois
- Number: 12

Career
Years	Teams
2014	(Cameroon) Bafia Evolution

Fawziya Abdoulkarim (born 1 March 1989) is a Cameroonian volleyball player. She is a member of the Cameroon women's national volleyball team and played for Bafia Evolution in 2014. She was part of the Cameroonian national team at the 2014 FIVB Volleyball Women's World Championship in Italy and at the 2016 Summer Olympics in Rio de Janeiro.

== Clubs ==
- (Cameroon) Bafia Evolution (2014–2015)
- France VBC Chamalière (2015–2017)
- France SOC Sens Olympique Club (2017–2020)
- France ESCV Entente Saint-Chamond (2020–2021)
- France VB Pays Viennois (2022-now)
