= Berthrade Bikatal =

Cameroonian volleyball player (born 1992)

Personal information
- Nationality: Cameroon
- Born: 23 July 1992 (age 34)
- Height: 1.71 m (5 ft 7 in)
- Weight: 66 kg (146 lb)
- Spike: 297 cm (117 in)
- Block: 271 cm (107 in)

Volleyball information
- Number: 10

Career
Years	Teams
2014	(Cameroon) Nyong-et-Kéllé

Berthrade Bikatal (born 23 July 1992) is a Cameroonian volleyball player.

She is a member of the Cameroon women's national volleyball team and played for Nyong-et-Kéllé in 2014. She was part of the Cameroonian national team at the 2014 FIVB Volleyball Women's World Championship in Italy and at the 2016 Summer Olympics in Rio de Janeiro.

== Clubs ==
- (Cameroon) Nyong-et-Kéllé (2014)
