= Yolande Amana Guigolo =

Cameroonian volleyball player (born 1997)

Yolande Amana Guigolo (born September 15, 1997) is a Cameroonian volleyball player. She was a member of the Cameroon women's national volleyball team at the 2016 Summer Olympics.
