= Cameroon women's national volleyball team =

National sports team

Cameroon
- Association: Cameroon Volleyball Federation
- Confederation: CAVB
- Head coach: Jean-René Akono
- FIVB ranking: 46 ▼1 (24 May 2026)

Uniforms
Home	Away

Summer Olympics
- Appearances: 1 (First in 2016)
- Best result: 11th place (2016)

World Championship
- Appearances: 5 (First in 2006)
- Best result: 21st place (2006, 2014, 2018)

The Cameroon women's national volleyball team represents Cameroon in international women's volleyball competitions and friendly matches. The team is one of the leading nations in women's volleyball on the African continent.

The team played in the 2014 FIVB Volleyball Women's World Championship in Italy, after securing a ticket by winning the African Pool T qualifiers with the best win–loss ratio.

Cameroon lastly qualified for the 2021 Women's African Nations Volleyball Championship where it won the gold medal.

== Results ==
=== Olympic Games ===
- 2016 — 11th place

=== FIVB World Championship ===
- 2006 — 21st place
- 2014 — 21st place
- 2018 — 21st place
- 2022 — 24th place
- 2025 — 32nd place
- 2027 — Qualified

=== FIVB World Cup ===
- 2019 — 12th place

=== FIVB World Grand Prix ===
- 2017 — 30th place

=== FIVB Volleyball Women's Challenger Cup ===
- 2022 — 8th place

=== African Championship ===
- 2003 — (bronze)
- 2005 — 5th place
- 2007 — 6th place
- 2009 — (bronze)
- 2011 — 5th place
- 2013 — (silver)
- 2015 — (bronze)
- 2017 — (gold)
- 2019 — (gold)
- 2021 — (gold)
- 2023 — (bronze)
- 2026 — (bronze)

=== All-Africa Games ===
- 2003 — 4th place
- 2007 — 2nd place
- 2011 — 2nd place
- 2015 — 2nd place
- 2019 — 2nd place

== Current squad ==
The following is the Cameroonian roster in the 2018 World Championship.

Head coach: Jean-René Akono

No.	Name	Date of birth	Height	Weight	Spike	Block	2017–18 club
1	Stéphanie Fotso Mogoung	25 September 1987	1.87 m (6 ft 2 in)	78 kg (172 lb)	301 cm (119 in)	275 cm (108 in)	(France) VC Harnes
2	Christelle Nana Tchoudjang (c)	7 July 1989	1.84 m (6 ft 0 in)	80 kg (180 lb)	308 cm (121 in)	285 cm (112 in)	(France) VBC Chamalières
3	Théorine Aboa Mbeza	25 August 1992	1.82 m (6 ft 0 in)	78 kg (172 lb)	294 cm (116 in)	275 cm (108 in)	(Cameroon) FAP VB
6	Laetitia Moma Bassoko	9 October 1993	1.84 m (6 ft 0 in)	81 kg (179 lb)	301 cm (119 in)	281 cm (111 in)	(France) VC Marcq-en-Barœul
7	Henriette Koulla	14 September 1992	1.71 m (5 ft 7 in)	67 kg (148 lb)	280 cm (110 in)	264 cm (104 in)	(France) Tremblay AC
9	Honorine Djakao Gamkoua	27 February 1992	1.72 m (5 ft 8 in)	65 kg (143 lb)	280 cm (110 in)	270 cm (110 in)	(Cameroon) FAP VB
10	Berthrade Bikatal	23 July 1992	1.83 m (6 ft 0 in)	76 kg (168 lb)	297 cm (117 in)	253 cm (100 in)	(France) CEP Poitiers Saint-Benoît VB
11	Victoire L'or Ngon Ntame	31 December 1985	1.77 m (5 ft 10 in)	79 kg (174 lb)	288 cm (113 in)	253 cm (100 in)	(Cameroon) INJS VB
12	Fawziya Abdoulkarim	1 March 1989	1.80 m (5 ft 11 in)	67 kg (148 lb)	292 cm (115 in)	275 cm (108 in)	(France) Sens Olympique Club Volley Ball
14	Yolande Amana Guigolo	15 September 1997	1.84 m (6 ft 0 in)	78 kg (172 lb)	292 cm (115 in)	275 cm (108 in)	(Cameroon) Bafia VB Evolution
15	Emelda Piata Zessi	8 April 1997	1.90 m (6 ft 3 in)	65 kg (143 lb)	295 cm (116 in)	281 cm (111 in)	(Cameroon) Bafia VB Evolution
16	Estelle Adiana	14 May 1997	1.82 m (6 ft 0 in)	85 kg (187 lb)	285 cm (112 in)	256 cm (101 in)	(Cameroon) Nyong et Kelle VB
19	Reine Ngameni Mbopda Davina	14 November 2002	1.68 m (5 ft 6 in)	65 kg (143 lb)	250 cm (98 in)	240 cm (94 in)	(Cameroon) Bafia VB Evolution
20	Ruth Manuela Marie Bibinbe	23 April 2002	1.88 m (6 ft 2 in)	81 kg (179 lb)	296 cm (117 in)	278 cm (109 in)	(Cameroon) Bafia VB Evolution

== See also ==
- Cameroon men's national volleyball team
