= Emelda Piata Zessi =

Cameroonian volleyball player (born 1997)

Emelda Piata Zessi (born April 8, 1997) is a Cameroonian volleyball player. She was a member of the Cameroon women's national volleyball team at the 2016 Summer Olympics.
