= Jean-René Akono =

Cameroonian volleyball player and coach

Jean René Akono

Personal information
- Nationality: Cameroonian
- Born: 4 August 1967 (age 59)
- Height: 190 cm (6 ft 3 in)

Volleyball information
- Number: 1 (national team)

Career
Years	Teams
1990	Amacam

National team
1990	Cameroon

Jean René Akono (born 4 August 1967) is a Cameroonian male volleyball player and coach. He was part of the Cameroon men's national volleyball team in over 100 games, including its 1989 victory at the African Championship. He played for Amacam in his club career.

Akono later became coach of the Cameroon women's national volleyball team. He coached the women's team at the 2016 Summer Olympics.

== Clubs ==
- Amacam (1990)
