= List of FIVB Women's Volleyball World Championship qualifications =

The FIVB Women's Volleyball World Championship is the process that a national women's volleyball team goes through to qualify for the FIVB Women's Volleyball World Championship finals.

Qualifying tournaments are held within the five FIVB continental zones (Africa, Asia and Oceania, North and Central America and Caribbean, South America, Europe), and are organized by their respective confederations. For each tournament, FIVB decides beforehand the number of places in the finals allocated to each of the continental zones, based on the numbers or relative strength of the confederations' teams.

The most recent qualification process was the 2025 FIVB Women's Volleyball World Championship qualification which commenced in 2022 and finished in 2024.

== History ==
=== Summary ===
Allocations of FIVB Women's Volleyball World Championship
Allocation	1952 (Soviet Union) (8)	1956 (France) (17)	1960 (Brazil) (10)	1962 (Soviet Union) (14)	1967 (Japan) (4)	1970 (Bulgaria) (16)	1974 (Mexico) (23)	1978 (Soviet Union) (23)	1982 (Peru) (23)	1986 (Czechoslovakia) (16)	1990 (China) (16)	1994 (Brazil) (16)	1998 (Japan) (16)	2002 (Germany) (24)	2006 (Japan) (24)	2010 (Japan) (24)	2014 (Italy) (24)	2018 (Japan) (24)	2022 (Netherlands) (Poland) (24)	2025 (Thailand) (32)
Africa								1	2–1	1	1		1	2	3	2	2	2	2	3
Asia						2	3	1	5	1	1	3	3	5	4	4	4	4	5	3
Europe						7	2	7	7	1	1	1	6	8	7	8	8	8	7	3
North America						2	4	1	3+1	1	1	1	3	5	6	6	6	6	4	3
South America						2		1	3	1	1	1	2	2	2	2	2	2	3	3
Host nation(s)	1	1	1	1	1	1	1	1	1	1	1	1	1	1	1	1	1	1	2	1
Defending champions									1			1		1	1	1	1	1	1	1
World Qualifiers										3	3	8								
World Cup	0	0	0	0	0	2	13	11		7		7								
Olympic champions									1											
Wild cards	7	16	9	13	3															
Highest-ranked-not-already-qualified teams according to the FIVB World Rankings																				15
Total	8	17	10	14	4	16	23	23	23	16	16	16	16	24	24	24	24	24	24	32

=== Graphical ===
- Gray = Africa
- Gold = Asia and Oceania
- Blue = Europe
- Red = North America, Central America and Caribbean
- Green = South America

Tournament	H	2	3	4	5	6	7	8	9	10	11	12	13	14	15	16	17	18	19	20	21	22	23	24	25	26	27	28	29	30	31	32
(Soviet Union) 1952		1	6																													
(France) 1956		2		12												1	1															
(Brazil) 1960		1	4				1	3																								
(Soviet Union) 1962		3			9									1																		
(Japan) 1967		1	1	1																												
(Bulgaria) 1970		3			7							3			2																	
(Mexico) 1974		4				10										6						2										
(Soviet Union) 1978		1	3			11											5					2										
(Peru) 1982		1	5					7							5					4												
(Czechoslovakia) 1986		1	4				5					3			2																	
(China) 1990		1	3			5					3			3																		
(Brazil) 1994		1	3			8								2		1																
(Japan) 1998		1	3			6						3			2																	
(Germany) 2002		2		5					8								6						2									
(Japan) 2006		3			4				8								6						2									
(Japan) 2010		2		4				9									6						2									
(Italy) 2014		2		4				9									6						2									
(Japan) 2018		2		4				8								7							2									
(Netherlands) (Poland) 2022	2		2		5					8								4				3										
(Thailand) 2025		3			3			16																6						3		

=== Participation ===
These are the number of teams that participated in all levels of qualification in the last world championship:

Year	Teams entered						Map
Year	Africa	Asia and Oceania	Europe	North America	South America	Total	Map
2018	16	12+1	42	38+1	7	115+2	

Key to map

Team qualified for World Championship
Team failed to qualify for World Championship
Team withdrew for World Championship
Team expelled from the tournament by FIVB prior to playing a match

== Current format ==
=== Summary ===
Confederation	Slots
Host nation(s)	1
Defending champions	1
CAVB (Africa)	3
AVC (Asia and Oceania)	3
CEV (Europe)	3
NORCECA (North America)	3
CSV (South America)	3
Highest-ranked-not-already-qualified teams according to the FIVB World Rankings	15
Total	32 (30+H+DC)

=== Africa ===
- First round: The bottom ranked tean of Africa were divided into seven groups of seven zonal association, later six groups of six zonal association. The group winners and runners-up advanced to the second round of FIVB World Championship qualification and CAVB Championship.
- Second round (CAVB Championship): A total of 13 teams (hosts, teams ranked 1–2 of Africa, nine first round winners and two wildcard teams), later 9 teams were divided into two groups. The top two teams of each group advanced to the play-offs. The winners of play-offs will qualified for the FIVB World Championship.

=== Asia and Oceania ===
- First round: The bottom ranked teams of Asia were divided into three groups of three zonal association. The group winners advanced to the second round of FIVB World Championship qualification.
- Second round: A total of 10 teams (teams ranked 1–7 and three first round winners) were divided into two groups of five teams. The top two teams of each group qualified for the FIVB World Championship.

=== Europe ===
- First round: The 8 bottom ranked teams of Asia were divided into two groups of small association. The group winners advanced to the second round of FIVB World Championship qualification. The first round will also act as the European Championship Small Countries Division qualification round.
- Second round: A total of 36 teams (teams ranked 1–34 and two first round winners) were divided into six groups of six teams. The winner team of each group qualified for the FIVB World Championship, whereas the runners-up in each pool will qualify for the third round.
- Third round: A total of 6 teams (runners-up of second round winners) played in round robin format. The top two teams qualified for the FIVB World Championship.

=== North America ===
- First round: The bottom ranked teams of North America were divided into three (CAZOVA), two (ECVA), a (AFECAVOL) group(s) of three zonal association. The best two teams of each group advanced to the second round of FIVB World Championship qualification.
- Second round (CAZOVA Championship and ECVA Championship): A total of 10 (CAZOVA), 6 (ECVA) teams (the best two teams in first round) were divided into two groups of 5 (CAZOVA), 3 (ECVA) teams. The winners teams of two tournaments qualified for the 2018 FIVB World Championship.
- Third round (NORCECA Continental Championship):

=== South America ===
- First round (CSV Championship): A total of 6 teams played in round robin format. The winners will qualified for the FIVB World Championship.
- Second round: A total of 4 teams played in round robin format. The winners will qualified for the FIVB World Championship.

== First appearance in qualification (1986–2022) ==
Note: Only teams that played at least one match are considered for the purposes of first appearance. Teams that withdrew prior to the qualification, or that qualified to the World Cup by walkover due to other teams' withdrawals, are not considered.

Edition	Africa	Asia and Oceania	Europe	North, Central America and Caribbean	South America	Total
(Japan) 1998	Algeria; Egypt; Kenya; Nigeria; Tunisia	Australia; China; Indonesia; Japan; Kazakhstan; Philippines; South Korea; Chinese Taipei; Thailand; Uzbekistan	Austria; Azerbaijan; Belarus; Belgium; Bulgaria; Croatia; Czech Republic; France; Germany; Greece; Hungary; Italy; Latvia; Netherlands; Poland; Portugal; Romania; Russia; Spain; Slovakia; Turkey; Ukraine; Yugoslavia (Note: The Federal Republic of Yugoslavia was later renamed as Serbia and Montenegro (first appearance: 2006), which in turn was succeeded by Serbia (first appearance: 2010).)	Barbados; Canada; Cuba; Dominican Republic; Mexico; Puerto Rico; United States	Argentina; Brazil; Peru; Venezuela	49+H
(Germany) 2002	Cameroon; Morocco; Namibia	Sri Lanka	Denmark; Finland; Israel; Norway; Slovenia; Switzerland	Aruba; Costa Rica; Jamaica; Netherlands Antilles	—	14
(Japan) 2006	Botswana; Congo; DR Congo; Eritrea; Mauritius; South Africa; Uganda	Jordan; Tonga	Albania; Bosnia and Herzegovina; England; Scotland	Anguilla; British Virgin Islands; Cayman Islands; Dominica; Guatemala; Honduras; Netherlands Antilles; Nicaragua; Panama; Saint Kitts and Nevis	Ecuador; Uruguay	25
(Japan) 2010	Mozambique; Senegal; Eswatini; Zimbabwe	Bangladesh; Fiji; New Zealand; Samoa	Estonia; Georgia; Great Britain; Moldova; Montenegro; Serbia	Antigua and Barbuda; Bahamas; Belize; Bermuda; El Salvador; Grenada; Haiti; Saint Lucia; Saint Vincent and the Grenadines; Suriname; Trinidad and Tobago	Bolivia; Chile; Colombia	28
(Italy) 2014	Burkina Faso; Burundi; Cape Verde; Gabon; Gambia; Ghana; Guinea; Ivory Coast; Lesotho; Malawi; Niger; Seychelles; Sierra Leone; Tanzania; Togo; Zambia	Hong Kong; India; Myanmar; Vietnam	Cyprus; Iceland; Liechtenstein; Lithuania; Luxembourg; North Macedonia; Malta; Northern Ireland; San Marino; Sweden	Bonaire; Curaçao; Guadeloupe; Martinique; Saint Martin; Sint Eustatius; Sint Maarten	—	37
(Japan) 2018	Rwanda	Iran; Maldives; Nepal; North Korea	Faroe Islands; Ireland; Kosovo	Turks and Caicos Islands; Saba	—	10
(Netherlands) (Poland) 2022	—	—	—	—	—	0

== See also ==
- National team appearances in the FIVB Women's Volleyball World Championship
