= 2014 FIVB Women's Volleyball World Championship qualification =

The 2014 FIVB Women's Volleyball World Championship featured 24 teams. One place was allocated to the hosts, Italy, but no automatic place is given to the defending champions, Russia. The remaining 23 places were determined by a qualification process, in which entrants from among the other teams from the five FIVB confederations will compete.

== Qualified teams ==
Country	Confederation	Qualified as	Qualified on	Previous appearances		
Country	Confederation	Qualified as	Qualified on	Total*	First	Last
Italy	CEV	Host	25 November 2009	10th	1978	2010
Thailand	AVC	AVC Pool A Runner-up	7 September 2013	4th	1998	2010
Japan	AVC	AVC Pool A Winner	7 September 2013	15th	1960	2010
Russia	CEV	2013 CEV Championship Winner	13 September 2013	16th^{1}	1952	2010
Germany	CEV	2013 CEV Championship Runner-up	13 September 2013	14th^{2}	1956	2010
Brazil	CSV	2013 CSV Championship Winner	21 September 2013	15th	1956	2010
China	AVC	AVC Pool B Winner	30 September 2013	13th	1956	2010
Kazakhstan	AVC	AVC Pool B Runner-up	1 October 2013	3rd	2006	2010
Argentina	CSV	CSV Qualification Tournament Winner	20 October 2013	5th	1960	2002
Turkey	CEV	CEV Pool I Winner	5 January 2014	3rd	2006	2010
Bulgaria	CEV	CEV Pool M Winner	5 January 2014	11th	1952	2002
Azerbaijan	CEV	CEV Pool J Winner	5 January 2014	3rd	1994	2006
Belgium	CEV	CEV Pool K Winner	5 January 2014	3rd	1956	1978
Croatia	CEV	CEV Pool L Winner	5 January 2014	3rd	1998	2010
Serbia	CEV	CEV Third Round Best Runner-up	5 January 2014	4th^{3}	1978	2010
Netherlands	CEV	CEV Third Round Second Best Runner-up	5 January 2014	13th	1956	2010
Tunisia	CAVB	CAVB Pool U Winner	22 February 2014	3rd	1978	1986
Cameroon	CAVB	CAVB Pool T Winner	1 March 2014	2nd	2006	2006
Cuba	NORCECA	NORCECA Pool Q Winner	17 May 2014	12th	1970	2010
United States	NORCECA	NORCECA Pool O Winner	18 May 2014	15th	1956	2010
Dominican Republic	NORCECA	NORCECA Pool P Winner	18 May 2014	7th	1974	2010
Canada	NORCECA	NORCECA Pool S Winner	19 May 2014	8th	1974	2010
Puerto Rico	NORCECA	NORCECA Pool R Winner	25 May 2014	6th	1974	2010
Mexico	NORCECA	NORCECA Playoff Winner	20 July 2014	7th	1970	2006

* Total (including 2014 edition).
1. Competed as Soviet Union from 1952 to 1990; 6th appearance as Russia.
2. Competed as West Germany from 1956 to 1990; 6th appearance as Germany.
3. Competed as Yugoslavia for 1978 and Serbia and Montenegro for 2006; 2nd appearance as Serbia.

== Confederation qualification processes ==
The distribution by confederation for the 2014 FIVB Women's Volleyball World Championship will be:

- Asia and Oceania (AVC): 4 places
- Africa (CAVB): 2 places
- Europe (CEV): 9 places (+ Italy qualified automatically as host nation for a total of 10 places)
- South America (CSV): 2 places
- North, Central America and Caribbean (NORCECA): 6 places

=== AVC ===
- Australia (Final Round)
- China (Final Round)
- Chinese Taipei (Zonal Round, Final Round)
- Hong Kong (Zonal Round)
- India (Zonal Round, Final Round)
- Indonesia (Zonal Round)
- Japan (Final Round)
- Kazakhstan (Final Round)
- Myanmar (Zonal Round)
- New Zealand (Final Round)
- Philippines (Zonal Round)
- South Korea (Final Round)
- Thailand (Final Round)
- Uzbekistan (Zonal Round)
- Vietnam (Zonal Round, Final Round)

=== CAVB ===
- Algeria (Sub Zonal Round, Final Round)
- Botswana (Sub Zonal Round, Zonal Round, Final Round)
- Burkina Faso (Sub Zonal Round)
- Burundi (Sub Zonal Round)
- Cameroon (Sub Zonal Round, Zonal Round, Final Round)
- Cape Verde (Sub Zonal Round, Zonal Round, Withdrew)
- Congo (Sub Zonal Round, Zonal Round)
- DR Congo (Sub Zonal Round, Zonal Round, Final Round)
- Egypt (Sub Zonal Round, Zonal Round, Final Round)
- Gabon (Sub Zonal Round)
- Gambia (Sub Zonal Round, Zonal Round)
- Ghana (Sub Zonal Round, Zonal Round, Withdrew)
- Guinea (Sub Zonal Round, Withdrew)
- Ivory Coast (Sub Zonal Round, Zonal Round)
- Kenya (Sub Zonal Round, Zonal Round, Final Round)
- Lesotho (Sub Zonal Round)
- Malawi (Sub Zonal Round)
- Mauritius (Sub Zonal Round, Zonal Round)
- Mozambique (Sub Zonal Round, Zonal Round, Final Round)
- Namibia (Sub Zonal Round, Zonal Round)
- Niger (Sub Zonal Round)
- Nigeria (Sub Zonal Round, Zonal Round, Final Round)
- Senegal (Sub Zonal Round, Zonal Round, Final Round)
- Seychelles (Sub Zonal Round, Zonal Round, Final Round)
- Sierra Leone (Sub Zonal Round)
- Eswatini (Sub Zonal Round, Zonal Round)
- Tanzania (Sub Zonal Round, Zonal Round)
- Togo (Sub Zonal Round, Zonal Round)
- Tunisia (Sub Zonal Round, Final Round)
- Uganda (Sub Zonal Round, Zonal Round, Final Round)
- Zambia (Sub Zonal Round, Zonal Round)
- Zimbabwe (Sub Zonal Round, Zonal Round)

=== CEV ===
- Albania (First Round)
- Austria (CEV Championship) (First Round)
- Azerbaijan (CEV Championship) (Third Round)
- Belarus (CEV Championship) (First Round, Third Round)
- Belgium (CEV Championship) (First Round, Third Round)
- Bosnia and Herzegovina (First Round)
- Bulgaria (CEV Championship) (Third Round)
- Croatia (CEV Championship) (First Round, Third Round)
- Cyprus (CEV Championship) (First Round, Third Round)
- Czech Republic (CEV Championship) (Third Round)
- Denmark (CEV Championship) (First Round)
- Estonia (First Round, Third Round)
- Finland (CEV Championship) (First Round)
- France (CEV Championship) (Third Round)
- Germany (CEV Championship)
- Great Britain (CEV Championship)
- Greece (CEV Championship) (First Round, Second Round)
- Hungary (CEV Championship) (First Round, Second Round, Third Round)
- Iceland (First Round)
- Israel (CEV Championship) (First Round, Second Round, Third Round)
- Latvia (CEV Championship) (First Round, Second Round)
- Liechtenstein (First Round)
- Lithuania (First Round)
- Luxembourg (First Round)
- North Macedonia (First Round)
- Malta (First Round)
- Moldova (First Round)
- Montenegro (CEV Championship) (First Round, Second Round)
- Netherlands (CEV Championship) (Third Round)
- Northern Ireland (First Round)
- Poland (CEV Championship) (Third Round)
- Portugal (CEV Championship) (First Round)
- Romania (CEV Championship) (Third Round)
- Russia (CEV Championship)
- San Marino (First Round)
- Scotland (First Round)
- Serbia (CEV Championship) (Third Round)
- Slovakia (CEV Championship) (First Round, Third Round)
- Slovenia (CEV Championship)
- Spain (CEV Championship) (Third Round)
- Sweden (CEV Championship)
- Switzerland (CEV Championship) (First Round, Second Round, Third Round)
- Turkey (CEV Championship) (Third Round)
- Ukraine (CEV Championship) (First Round, Third Round)

=== CSV ===
- Argentina (CSV Championship) (Qualification Tournament)
- Brazil (CSV Championship)
- Chile (CSV Championship)
- Colombia (CSV Championship) (Qualification Tournament)
- Peru (CSV Championship) (Qualification Tournament)
- Venezuela (CSV Championship)

=== NORCECA ===
- Anguilla (First Round, Second Round)
- Antigua and Barbuda (First Round, Second Round)
- Aruba (First Round, Second Round)
- Bahamas (First Round)
- Barbados (First Round, Second Round, Third Round)
- Belize (First Round, Second Round)
- Bermuda (First Round, Second Round)
- Bonaire (First Round)
- British Virgin Islands (First Round, Second Round)
- Canada (Third Round)
- Cayman Islands (First Round)
- Costa Rica (Third Round, Playoff round)
- Cuba (Third Round)
- Curaçao (First Round, Second Round, Third Round)
- Dominica (First Round, Second Round)
- Dominican Republic (Third Round)
- El Salvador (First Round, Second Round, Third Round)
- Grenada (First Round, Second Round)
- Guadeloupe (First Round, Second Round, Third Round)
- Guatemala (First Round, Second Round, Third Round)
- Haiti (First Round, Second Round, Third Round)
- Honduras (First Round, Second Round, Third Round)
- Jamaica (First Round, Second Round, Third Round)
- Martinique (First Round)
- Mexico (Third Round, Playoff round)
- Nicaragua (First Round, Second Round, Third Round, Playoff round)
- Panama (First Round, Second Round, Third Round, Playoff round)
- Puerto Rico (Third Round)
- Saint Kitts and Nevis (First Round, Second Round)
- Saint Lucia (First Round, Second Round, Third Round)
- Saint Martin (First Round)
- Saint Vincent and the Grenadines (First Round, Second Round)
- Sint Eustatius (First Round)
- Sint Maarten (First Round)
- Suriname (First Round, Second Round)
- Trinidad and Tobago (First Round, Second Round, Third Round, Playoff round)
- U.S. Virgin Islands (First Round, Second Round, Third Round)
- United States (Third Round)
