= 2014 FIVB Women's Volleyball World Championship qualification (CAVB) =

The CAVB qualification for the 2014 FIVB Women's Volleyball World Championship saw member nations compete for two places at the finals in Italy.

== Draw ==
42 CAVB national teams entered qualification (10 teams later withdrew). The teams were distributed according to their geographical positions.

Sub zonal round

| Zone 1 (Pool A) | Zone 2 (Pool B) | Zone 2 (Pool C) | Zone 3 (Pool D) |
|---|---|---|---|
| Algeria; ~~Morocco~~; Tunisia | Cape Verde; Gambia; Guinea; Senegal; Sierra Leone | Merged with Pool B | Burkina Faso; Ghana; Ivory Coast; ~~Liberia~~ |
| Zone 3 (Pool E) | Zone 4 (Pool F) | Zone 4 (Pool G) | Zone 5 (Pool H) |
| ~~Benin~~; Niger; Nigeria; Togo | Cameroon; ~~Chad~~; Congo; DR Congo; Gabon | Merged with Pool F | Burundi; Kenya; Tanzania; Uganda |
| Zone 5 (Pool I) | Zone 6 (Pool J) | Zone 6 (Pool K) | Zone 7 (Pool L) |
| Egypt; ~~Ethiopia~~; ~~Rwanda~~; ~~Sudan~~ | Botswana; Lesotho; Mozambique; ~~South Africa~~; Eswatini | Malawi; Namibia; Zambia; Zimbabwe | ~~Comoros~~; ~~Madagascar~~; Mauritius; Seychelles |

- Pool I later merged with Pool H after Rwanda and Sudan pulled out of the competition. Egypt and Ethiopia, which were the other two teams in Pool I, joined other teams in Pool H.

Final round

The draw for the final round of competition was held in Cairo on 9 October 2013. The top two FIVB ranked teams Algeria and Kenya headed the pools.

| Pool T | Pool U |
|---|---|
| Algeria; 1st Zone 6; 1st Zone 3; 1st Zone 4; 2nd Zone 4; 2nd Zone 3; 2nd Zone 5 | Kenya; 1st Zone 7; 1st Zone 5; 1st Zone 1; 1st Zone 2; 2nd Zone 6; 2nd Zone 2 |

== Sub zonal round ==
=== Pool A ===
- Venue: Salle Ammar Dakhlaoui, Sidi Bou Said, Tunisia
- Dates: July 18–19, 2013
- All times are Central European Time (UTC+01:00)

| Pos | Team | Pld | W | L | Pts | SW | SL | SR | SPW | SPL | SPR |
|---|---|---|---|---|---|---|---|---|---|---|---|
| 1 | Tunisia | 2 | 2 | 0 | 6 | 6 | 0 | MAX | 152 | 121 | 1.256 |
| 2 | Algeria | 2 | 0 | 2 | 0 | 0 | 6 | 0.000 | 121 | 152 | 0.796 |

| Date | Time | | Score | | Set 1 | Set 2 | Set 3 | Set 4 | Set 5 | Total | Report |
|---|---|---|---|---|---|---|---|---|---|---|---|
| 18 Jul | 22:30 | Algeria | 0–3 | Tunisia | 14–25 | 16–25 | 20–25 | | | 50–75 | Report |
| 19 Jul | 22:30 | Tunisia | 3–0 | Algeria | 27–25 | 25–23 | 25–23 | | | 77–71 | Report |

=== Pool B ===
- Venue: Marius Ndiaye Stadium, Dakar, Senegal
- Dates: July 18–21, 2013
- All times are Greenwich Mean Time (UTC±00:00)

| Pos | Team | Pld | W | L | Pts | SW | SL | SR | SPW | SPL | SPR |
|---|---|---|---|---|---|---|---|---|---|---|---|
| 1 | Senegal | 4 | 4 | 0 | 12 | 12 | 0 | MAX | 300 | 122 | 2.459 |
| 2 | Cape Verde | 4 | 3 | 1 | 9 | 9 | 3 | 3.000 | 269 | 211 | 1.275 |
| 3 | Guinea | 4 | 2 | 2 | 5 | 6 | 9 | 0.667 | 279 | 323 | 0.864 |
| 4 | Gambia | 4 | 1 | 3 | 4 | 5 | 9 | 0.556 | 234 | 304 | 0.770 |
| 5 | Sierra Leone | 4 | 0 | 4 | 0 | 1 | 12 | 0.083 | 201 | 323 | 0.622 |

| Date | Time | | Score | | Set 1 | Set 2 | Set 3 | Set 4 | Set 5 | Total | Report |
|---|---|---|---|---|---|---|---|---|---|---|---|
| 18 Jul | 10:00 | Sierra Leone | 0–3 | Cape Verde | 16–25 | 9–25 | 13–25 | | | 38–75 | Report |
| 18 Jul | 20:30 | Guinea | 0–3 | Senegal | 10–25 | 12–25 | 6–25 | | | 28–75 | Report |
| 18 Jul | 21:30 | Cape Verde | 3–0 | Gambia | 25–17 | 25–16 | 25–12 | | | 75–45 | Report |
| 19 Jul | 10:00 | Gambia | 3–0 | Sierra Leone | 25–16 | 25–20 | 25–18 | | | 75–54 | Report |
| 19 Jul | 20:30 | Senegal | 3–0 | Sierra Leone | 25–7 | 25–12 | 25–9 | | | 75–28 | Report |
| 19 Jul | 21:30 | Guinea | 0–3 | Cape Verde | 19–25 | 23–25 | 11–25 | | | 53–75 | Report |
| 20 Jul | 20:30 | Senegal | 3–0 | Gambia | 25–8 | 25–5 | 25–9 | | | 75–22 | Report |
| 20 Jul | 21:30 | Sierra Leone | 1–3 | Guinea | 15–25 | 19–25 | 25–23 | 22–25 | | 81–98 | Report |
| 21 Jul | 15:00 | Gambia | 2–3 | Guinea | 25–15 | 14–25 | 25–20 | 15–25 | 13–15 | 92–100 | Report |
| 21 Jul | 16:00 | Cape Verde | 0–3 | Senegal | 22–25 | 12–25 | 10–25 | | | 44–75 | Report |

=== Pool D ===
- Venue: Palais des Sports de Ouaga 2000, Ouagadougou, Burkina Faso
- Dates: July 17–19, 2013
- All times are Greenwich Mean Time (UTC±00:00)

| Pos | Team | Pld | W | L | Pts | SW | SL | SR | SPW | SPL | SPR |
|---|---|---|---|---|---|---|---|---|---|---|---|
| 1 | Ghana | 2 | 2 | 0 | 6 | 6 | 1 | 6.000 | 174 | 136 | 1.279 |
| 2 | Ivory Coast | 2 | 1 | 1 | 3 | 4 | 3 | 1.333 | 166 | 150 | 1.107 |
| 3 | Burkina Faso | 2 | 0 | 2 | 0 | 0 | 6 | 0.000 | 96 | 150 | 0.640 |

| Date | Time | | Score | | Set 1 | Set 2 | Set 3 | Set 4 | Set 5 | Total | Report |
|---|---|---|---|---|---|---|---|---|---|---|---|
| 17 Jul | 18:30 | Ghana | 3–0 | Burkina Faso | 25–15 | 25–13 | 25–17 | | | 75–45 | Report |
| 18 Jul | 18:30 | Ivory Coast | 1–3 | Ghana | 25–27 | 25–22 | 20–25 | 21–25 | | 91–99 | Report |
| 19 Jul | 18:30 | Burkina Faso | 0–3 | Ivory Coast | 19–25 | 18–25 | 14–25 | | | 51–75 | Report |

=== Pool E ===
- Venue: Indoor Sports Hall, Abuja, Nigeria
- Dates: July 23–25, 2013
- All times are West Africa Time (UTC+01:00)

| Pos | Team | Pld | W | L | Pts | SW | SL | SR | SPW | SPL | SPR |
|---|---|---|---|---|---|---|---|---|---|---|---|
| 1 | Nigeria | 2 | 2 | 0 | 6 | 6 | 0 | MAX | 150 | 67 | 2.239 |
| 2 | Togo | 2 | 1 | 1 | 2 | 3 | 5 | 0.600 | 143 | 176 | 0.813 |
| 3 | Niger | 2 | 0 | 2 | 1 | 2 | 6 | 0.333 | 130 | 180 | 0.722 |

| Date | Time | | Score | | Set 1 | Set 2 | Set 3 | Set 4 | Set 5 | Total | Report |
|---|---|---|---|---|---|---|---|---|---|---|---|
| 23 Jul | 17:00 | Niger | 2–3 | Togo | 23–25 | 25–20 | 22–25 | 25–20 | 6–15 | 101–105 | Report |
| 24 Jul | 17:00 | Niger | 0–3 | Nigeria | 11–25 | 8–25 | 10–25 | | | 29–75 | Report |
| 25 Jul | 17:00 | Togo | 0–3 | Nigeria | 14–25 | 13–25 | 11–25 | | | 38–75 | Report |

=== Pool F ===
- Venue: Gymnase du Prytanée Militaire, Libreville, Gabon
- Dates: July 19–21, 2013

| Pos | Team | Pld | W | L | Pts | SW | SL | SR | SPW | SPL | SPR |
|---|---|---|---|---|---|---|---|---|---|---|---|
| 1 | Cameroon | 3 | 3 | 0 | 9 | 9 | 0 | MAX | 225 | 98 | 2.296 |
| 2 | DR Congo | 3 | 2 | 1 | 6 | 6 | 3 | 2.000 | 202 | 166 | 1.217 |
| 3 | Congo | 3 | 1 | 2 | 3 | 3 | 6 | 0.500 | 152 | 190 | 0.800 |
| 4 | Gabon | 3 | 0 | 3 | 0 | 0 | 9 | 0.000 | 100 | 225 | 0.444 |

| Date | Time | | Score | | Set 1 | Set 2 | Set 3 | Set 4 | Set 5 | Total | Report |
|---|---|---|---|---|---|---|---|---|---|---|---|
| 19 Jul | 16:00 | Congo | 0–3 | DR Congo | 15–25 | 22–25 | 17–25 | | | 54–75 | Report |
| 19 Jul | 18:00 | Cameroon | 3–0 | Gabon | 25–14 | 25–7 | 25–2 | | | 75–23 | Report |
| 20 Jul | 16:00 | Cameroon | 3–0 | Congo | 25–8 | 25–9 | 25–6 | | | 75–23 | Report |
| 20 Jul | 18:00 | Gabon | 0–3 | DR Congo | 18–25 | 9–25 | 10–25 | | | 37–75 | Report |
| 21 Jul | 16:00 | DR Congo | 0–3 | Cameroon | 20–25 | 19–25 | 13–25 | | | 52–75 | Report |
| 21 Jul | 18:00 | Congo | 3–0 | Gabon | 25–19 | 25–8 | 25–13 | | | 75–40 | Report |

=== Pool H ===
- Venue: Kasarani Hall, Nairobi, Kenya
- Dates: July 26–30, 2013
- All times are East Africa Time (UTC+03:00)

| Pos | Team | Pld | W | L | Pts | SW | SL | SR | SPW | SPL | SPR |
|---|---|---|---|---|---|---|---|---|---|---|---|
| 1 | Kenya | 4 | 4 | 0 | 12 | 12 | 1 | 12.000 | 318 | 196 | 1.622 |
| 2 | Egypt | 4 | 3 | 1 | 9 | 10 | 3 | 3.333 | 304 | 199 | 1.528 |
| 3 | Uganda | 4 | 2 | 2 | 6 | 6 | 6 | 1.000 | 241 | 225 | 1.071 |
| 4 | Tanzania | 4 | 1 | 3 | 3 | 3 | 10 | 0.300 | 210 | 306 | 0.686 |
| 5 | Burundi | 4 | 0 | 4 | 0 | 1 | 12 | 0.083 | 171 | 318 | 0.538 |

| Date | Time | | Score | | Set 1 | Set 2 | Set 3 | Set 4 | Set 5 | Total | Report |
|---|---|---|---|---|---|---|---|---|---|---|---|
| 26 Jul | 14:00 | Egypt | 3–0 | Tanzania | 25–9 | 25–12 | 25–11 | | | 75–32 | Report |
| 26 Jul | 16:00 | Burundi | 0–3 | Kenya | 9–25 | 9–25 | 10–25 | | | 28–75 | Report |
| 27 Jul | 14:00 | Tanzania | 3–1 | Burundi | 25–16 | 18–25 | 25–17 | 25–23 | | 93–81 | Report |
| 27 Jul | 16:00 | Uganda | 0–3 | Egypt | 12–25 | 15–25 | 12–25 | | | 39–75 | Report |
| 28 Jul | 14:00 | Burundi | 0–3 | Uganda | 10–25 | 6–25 | 11–25 | | | 27–75 | Report |
| 28 Jul | 16:00 | Kenya | 3–0 | Tanzania | 25–10 | 25–11 | 25–16 | | | 75–37 | Report |
| 29 Jul | 14:00 | Egypt | 3–0 | Burundi | 25–14 | 25–10 | 25–11 | | | 75–35 | Report |
| 29 Jul | 16:00 | Uganda | 0–3 | Kenya | 20–25 | 18–25 | 14–25 | | | 52–75 | Report |
| 30 Jul | 14:00 | Tanzania | 0–3 | Uganda | 15–25 | 16–25 | 17–25 | | | 48–75 | Report |
| 30 Jul | 16:00 | Kenya | 3–1 | Egypt | 25–17 | 25–15 | 18–25 | 25–22 | | 93–79 | Report |

=== Pool J ===
- Venue: Pavilhão da Munhuana, Maputo, Mozambique
- Dates: July 3–6, 2013
- All times are Central Africa Time (UTC+02:00)

| Pos | Team | Pld | W | L | Pts | SW | SL | SR | SPW | SPL | SPR |
|---|---|---|---|---|---|---|---|---|---|---|---|
| 1 | Botswana | 3 | 3 | 0 | 9 | 9 | 0 | MAX | 225 | 118 | 1.907 |
| 2 | Eswatini | 3 | 2 | 1 | 5 | 6 | 6 | 1.000 | 237 | 254 | 0.933 |
| 3 | Mozambique | 3 | 1 | 2 | 4 | 5 | 6 | 0.833 | 213 | 239 | 0.891 |
| 4 | Lesotho | 3 | 0 | 3 | 0 | 1 | 9 | 0.111 | 180 | 244 | 0.738 |

| Date | Time | | Score | | Set 1 | Set 2 | Set 3 | Set 4 | Set 5 | Total | Report |
|---|---|---|---|---|---|---|---|---|---|---|---|
| 03 Jul | 16:00 | Botswana | 3–0 | Eswatini | 25–14 | 25–10 | 25–11 | | | 75–35 | Report |
| 03 Jul | 18:00 | Lesotho | 0–3 | Mozambique | 12–25 | 21–25 | 23–25 | | | 56–75 | Report |
| 04 Jul | 16:00 | Eswatini | 3–2 | Mozambique | 23–25 | 25–15 | 25–19 | 20–25 | 15–12 | 108–96 | Report |
| 04 Jul | 18:00 | Botswana | 3–0 | Lesotho | 25–10 | 25–16 | 25–15 | | | 75–41 | Report |
| 06 Jul | 16:00 | Lesotho | 1–3 | Eswatini | 25–19 | 22–25 | 16–25 | 20–25 | | 83–94 | Report |
| 06 Jul | 18:00 | Mozambique | 0–3 | Botswana | 12–25 | 15–25 | 15–25 | | | 42–75 | Report |

=== Pool K ===
- Venue: African Bible College, Lilongwe, Malawi
- Dates: July 23–25, 2013
- All times are Central Africa Time (UTC+02:00)

| Pos | Team | Pld | W | L | Pts | SW | SL | SR | SPW | SPL | SPR |
|---|---|---|---|---|---|---|---|---|---|---|---|
| 1 | Zimbabwe | 3 | 3 | 0 | 8 | 9 | 3 | 3.000 | 273 | 215 | 1.270 |
| 2 | Namibia | 3 | 2 | 1 | 6 | 7 | 4 | 1.750 | 248 | 230 | 1.078 |
| 3 | Zambia | 3 | 1 | 2 | 4 | 5 | 6 | 0.833 | 244 | 225 | 1.084 |
| 4 | Malawi | 3 | 0 | 3 | 0 | 1 | 9 | 0.111 | 149 | 244 | 0.611 |

| Date | Time | | Score | | Set 1 | Set 2 | Set 3 | Set 4 | Set 5 | Total | Report |
|---|---|---|---|---|---|---|---|---|---|---|---|
| 23 Jul | 14:00 | Malawi | 0–3 | Zimbabwe | 5–25 | 9–25 | 22–25 | | | 36–75 | Report |
| 23 Jul | 16:00 | Namibia | 3–0 | Zambia | 25–22 | 26–24 | 25–22 | | | 76–68 | Report |
| 24 Jul | 18:00 | Zimbabwe | 3–2 | Zambia | 25–21 | 21–25 | 25–20 | 23–25 | 15–10 | 109–101 | Report |
| 24 Jul | 20:00 | Malawi | 1–3 | Namibia | 20–25 | 25–19 | 14–25 | 14–25 | | 73–94 | Report |
| 25 Jul | 12:00 | Namibia | 1–3 | Zimbabwe | 21–25 | 11–25 | 25–14 | 21–25 | | 78–89 | Report |
| 25 Jul | 14:00 | Zambia | 3–0 | Malawi | 25–19 | 25–13 | 25–8 | | | 75–40 | Report |

=== Pool L ===
- Venue: Palais des Sports, Victoria, Seychelles
- Dates: July 26–28, 2013
- All times are Seychelles Time (UTC+04:00)

| Pos | Team | Pld | W | L | Pts | SW | SL | SR | SPW | SPL | SPR |
|---|---|---|---|---|---|---|---|---|---|---|---|
| 1 | Seychelles | 2 | 2 | 0 | 6 | 6 | 2 | 3.000 | 192 | 161 | 1.193 |
| 2 | Mauritius | 2 | 0 | 2 | 0 | 2 | 6 | 0.333 | 161 | 192 | 0.839 |

| Date | Time | | Score | | Set 1 | Set 2 | Set 3 | Set 4 | Set 5 | Total | Report |
|---|---|---|---|---|---|---|---|---|---|---|---|
| 26 Jul | 17:00 | Seychelles | 3–1 | Mauritius | 22–25 | 25–14 | 25–20 | 25–18 | | 97–77 | Report |
| 28 Jul | 16:00 | Mauritius | 1–3 | Seychelles | 22–25 | 21–25 | 25–20 | 16–25 | | 84–95 | Report |

== Zonal round ==
=== Pool N ===
- Venue: Pavilhão Desportivo Vavá Duarte, Praia, Cape Verde
- Dates: November 8–10, 2013
- All times are Cape Verde Time (UTC−01:00)

| Pos | Team | Pld | W | L | Pts | SW | SL | SR | SPW | SPL | SPR |
|---|---|---|---|---|---|---|---|---|---|---|---|
| 1 | Senegal | 2 | 2 | 0 | 6 | 6 | 0 | MAX | 150 | 84 | 1.786 |
| 2 | Cape Verde | 2 | 1 | 1 | 3 | 3 | 4 | 0.750 | 156 | 147 | 1.061 |
| 3 | Gambia | 2 | 0 | 2 | 0 | 1 | 6 | 0.167 | 100 | 175 | 0.571 |

- Guinea qualified from the sub zonal round but withdrew.

| Date | Time | | Score | | Set 1 | Set 2 | Set 3 | Set 4 | Set 5 | Total | Report |
|---|---|---|---|---|---|---|---|---|---|---|---|
| 08 Nov | 18:30 | Cape Verde | 3–1 | Gambia | 25–27 | 25–17 | 25–14 | 25–14 | | 100–72 | Report |
| 09 Nov | 18:30 | Gambia | 0–3 | Senegal | 8–25 | 5–25 | 15–25 | | | 28–75 | Report |
| 10 Nov | 17:00 | Cape Verde | 0–3 | Senegal | 23–25 | 16–25 | 17–25 | | | 56–75 | Report |

=== Pool O ===
- Venue: Forum de l'Université de Cocody, Abidjan, Ivory Coast
- Dates: November 28–30, 2013
- All times are Greenwich Mean Time (UTC±00:00)

| Pos | Team | Pld | W | L | Pts | SW | SL | SR | SPW | SPL | SPR |
|---|---|---|---|---|---|---|---|---|---|---|---|
| 1 | Ghana | 3 | 3 | 0 | 8 | 9 | 3 | 3.000 | 272 | 217 | 1.253 |
| 2 | Nigeria | 3 | 2 | 1 | 6 | 7 | 3 | 2.333 | 229 | 194 | 1.180 |
| 3 | Ivory Coast | 3 | 1 | 2 | 4 | 5 | 6 | 0.833 | 224 | 228 | 0.982 |
| 4 | Togo | 3 | 0 | 3 | 0 | 0 | 9 | 0.000 | 140 | 226 | 0.619 |

| Date | Time | | Score | | Set 1 | Set 2 | Set 3 | Set 4 | Set 5 | Total | Report |
|---|---|---|---|---|---|---|---|---|---|---|---|
| 28 Nov | 16:30 | Ghana | 3–1 | Nigeria | 25–20 | 25–21 | 24–26 | 25–12 | | 99–79 | Report |
| 28 Nov | 18:30 | Ivory Coast | 3–0 | Togo | 25–10 | 25–21 | 26–24 | | | 76–55 | Report |
| 29 Nov | 16:30 | Togo | 0–3 | Nigeria | 12–25 | 10–25 | 19–25 | | | 41–75 | Report |
| 29 Nov | 18:30 | Ivory Coast | 2–3 | Ghana | 25–13 | 21–25 | 18–25 | 25–20 | 5–15 | 94–98 | Report |
| 30 Nov | 16:30 | Ghana | 3–0 | Togo | 25–15 | 25–11 | 25–18 | | | 75–44 | Report |
| 30 Nov | 18:30 | Nigeria | 3–0 | Ivory Coast | 25–23 | 25–19 | 25–12 | | | 75–54 | Report |

=== Pool P ===
- Venue: (Democratic Republic of the Congo) Stadium des Martyrs, Kinshasa, DR Congo
- Dates: November 3–4, 2013
- All times are West Africa Time (UTC+01:00)

| Pos | Team | Pld | W | L | Pts | SW | SL | SR | SPW | SPL | SPR |
|---|---|---|---|---|---|---|---|---|---|---|---|
| 1 | Cameroon | 2 | 2 | 0 | 6 | 6 | 0 | MAX | 150 | 85 | 1.765 |
| 2 | DR Congo | 2 | 1 | 1 | 3 | 3 | 3 | 1.000 | 124 | 138 | 0.899 |
| 3 | Congo | 2 | 0 | 2 | 0 | 0 | 6 | 0.000 | 99 | 150 | 0.660 |

| Date | Time | | Score | | Set 1 | Set 2 | Set 3 | Set 4 | Set 5 | Total | Report |
|---|---|---|---|---|---|---|---|---|---|---|---|
| 03 Nov | 09:00 | Congo | 0–3 | DR Congo | 23–25 | 21–25 | 19–25 | | | 63–75 | Report |
| 03 Nov | 17:00 | Cameroon | 3–0 | Congo | 25–10 | 25–15 | 25–11 | | | 75–36 | Report |
| 04 Nov | 17:00 | DR Congo | 0–3 | Cameroon | 19–25 | 10–25 | 20–25 | | | 49–75 | Report |

=== Pool Q ===
- Venue: MTN Arena, Kampala, Uganda
- Dates: October 17–19, 2013
- All times are East Africa Time (UTC+03:00)

| Pos | Team | Pld | W | L | Pts | SW | SL | SR | SPW | SPL | SPR |
|---|---|---|---|---|---|---|---|---|---|---|---|
| 1 | Kenya | 3 | 3 | 0 | 8 | 9 | 2 | 4.500 | 253 | 198 | 1.278 |
| 2 | Uganda | 3 | 2 | 1 | 6 | 6 | 3 | 2.000 | 220 | 203 | 1.084 |
| 3 | Egypt | 3 | 1 | 2 | 4 | 5 | 6 | 0.833 | 230 | 227 | 1.013 |
| 4 | Tanzania | 3 | 0 | 3 | 0 | 0 | 9 | 0.000 | 156 | 231 | 0.675 |

| Date | Time | | Score | | Set 1 | Set 2 | Set 3 | Set 4 | Set 5 | Total | Report |
|---|---|---|---|---|---|---|---|---|---|---|---|
| 17 Oct | 18:00 | Egypt | 2–3 | Kenya | 16–25 | 25–21 | 25–17 | 15–25 | 13–15 | 94–103 | Report |
| 17 Oct | 20:00 | Uganda | 3–0 | Tanzania | 25–20 | 25–20 | 30–28 | | | 80–68 | Report |
| 18 Oct | 19:30 | Tanzania | 0–3 | Egypt | 10–25 | 15–25 | 24–26 | | | 49–76 | Report |
| 18 Oct | 21:30 | Kenya | 3–0 | Uganda | 25–22 | 25–22 | 25–21 | | | 75–65 | Report |
| 19 Oct | 18:00 | Kenya | 3–0 | Tanzania | 25–11 | 25–17 | 25–11 | | | 75–39 | Report |
| 19 Oct | 20:00 | Egypt | 0–3 | Uganda | 18–25 | 22–25 | 20–25 | | | 60–75 | Report |

=== Pool R ===
- Venue: National Sports Development Centre, Lusaka, Zambia
- Dates: October 22–26, 2013
- All times are Central Africa Time (UTC+02:00)

| Pos | Team | Pld | W | L | Pts | SW | SL | SR | SPW | SPL | SPR |
|---|---|---|---|---|---|---|---|---|---|---|---|
| 1 | Botswana | 5 | 5 | 0 | 15 | 15 | 0 | MAX | 375 | 185 | 2.027 |
| 2 | Mozambique | 5 | 4 | 1 | 10 | 12 | 7 | 1.714 | 404 | 360 | 1.122 |
| 3 | Namibia | 5 | 3 | 2 | 8 | 9 | 9 | 1.000 | 364 | 392 | 0.929 |
| 4 | Zimbabwe | 5 | 2 | 3 | 8 | 10 | 10 | 1.000 | 400 | 408 | 0.980 |
| 5 | Zambia | 5 | 1 | 4 | 4 | 7 | 12 | 0.583 | 368 | 420 | 0.876 |
| 6 | Eswatini | 5 | 0 | 5 | 0 | 0 | 15 | 0.000 | 229 | 375 | 0.611 |

| Date | Time | | Score | | Set 1 | Set 2 | Set 3 | Set 4 | Set 5 | Total | Report |
|---|---|---|---|---|---|---|---|---|---|---|---|
| 22 Oct | 14:00 | Namibia | 0–3 | Botswana | 9–25 | 16–25 | 13–25 | | | 38–75 | Report |
| 22 Oct | 16:00 | Eswatini | 0–3 | Zambia | 10–25 | 18–25 | 18–25 | | | 46–75 | Report |
| 22 Oct | 18:00 | Mozambique | 3–2 | Zimbabwe | 25–18 | 25–18 | 24–26 | 23–25 | 15–7 | 112–94 | Report |
| 23 Oct | 14:00 | Zimbabwe | 3–1 | Zambia | 20–25 | 25–16 | 25–21 | 25–16 | | 95–78 | Report |
| 23 Oct | 16:00 | Botswana | 3–0 | Eswatini | 25–9 | 25–10 | 25–15 | | | 75–34 | Report |
| 23 Oct | 18:00 | Mozambique | 3–0 | Namibia | 25–19 | 25–13 | 25–12 | | | 75–44 | Report |
| 24 Oct | 14:00 | Namibia | 3–2 | Zimbabwe | 23–25 | 25–22 | 25–19 | 19–25 | 15–13 | 107–104 | Report |
| 24 Oct | 16:00 | Eswatini | 0–3 | Mozambique | 21–25 | 22–25 | 23–25 | | | 66–75 | Report |
| 24 Oct | 18:00 | Zambia | 0–3 | Botswana | 11–25 | 13–25 | 19–25 | | | 43–75 | Report |
| 25 Oct | 14:00 | Botswana | 3–0 | Zimbabwe | 25–11 | 25–17 | 25–4 | | | 75–32 | Report |
| 25 Oct | 16:00 | Mozambique | 3–2 | Zambia | 20–25 | 25–17 | 19–25 | 25–10 | 15–4 | 104–81 | Report |
| 25 Oct | 18:00 | Namibia | 3–0 | Eswatini | 25–16 | 25–20 | 25–11 | | | 75–47 | Report |
| 26 Oct | 14:00 | Zimbabwe | 3–0 | Eswatini | 25–10 | 25–15 | 25–11 | | | 75–36 | Report |
| 26 Oct | 16:00 | Zambia | 1–3 | Namibia | 20–25 | 22–25 | 27–25 | 22–25 | | 91–100 | Report |
| 26 Oct | 18:00 | Botswana | 3–0 | Mozambique | 25–13 | 25–17 | 25–8 | | | 75–38 | Report |

=== Pool S ===
- Venue: Gymnase Pandit-Sahadeo, Vacoas-Phoenix, Mauritius
- Dates: October 6, 2013
- All times are Mauritius Time (UTC+04:00)

| Pos | Team | Pld | W | L | Pts | SW | SL | SR | SPW | SPL | SPR |
|---|---|---|---|---|---|---|---|---|---|---|---|
| 1 | Seychelles | 1 | 1 | 0 | 2 | 3 | 2 | 1.500 | 113 | 108 | 1.046 |
| 2 | Mauritius | 1 | 0 | 1 | 1 | 2 | 3 | 0.667 | 108 | 113 | 0.956 |

| Date | Time | | Score | | Set 1 | Set 2 | Set 3 | Set 4 | Set 5 | Total | Report |
|---|---|---|---|---|---|---|---|---|---|---|---|
| 06 Oct | 16:00 | Mauritius | 2–3 | Seychelles | 19–25 | 31–29 | 25–19 | 22–25 | 11–15 | 108–113 | Report |

== Final round ==
=== Pool T ===
- Venue: Salle Hacène Harcha, Algiers, Algeria
- Dates: February 23 – March 1, 2014
- All times are Central European Time (UTC+01:00)

| Pos | Team | Pld | W | L | Pts | SW | SL | SR | SPW | SPL | SPR |
|---|---|---|---|---|---|---|---|---|---|---|---|
| 1 | Cameroon | 5 | 4 | 1 | 13 | 14 | 4 | 3.500 | 427 | 331 | 1.290 |
| 2 | Egypt | 5 | 4 | 1 | 12 | 14 | 5 | 2.800 | 443 | 340 | 1.303 |
| 3 | Algeria | 5 | 4 | 1 | 11 | 13 | 5 | 2.600 | 427 | 299 | 1.428 |
| 4 | Botswana | 5 | 2 | 3 | 6 | 6 | 9 | 0.667 | 276 | 340 | 0.812 |
| 5 | Nigeria | 5 | 1 | 4 | 3 | 3 | 13 | 0.231 | 275 | 387 | 0.711 |
| 6 | DR Congo | 5 | 0 | 5 | 0 | 1 | 15 | 0.067 | 247 | 398 | 0.621 |

- Ghana qualified from the zonal round but withdrew.

| Date | Time | | Score | | Set 1 | Set 2 | Set 3 | Set 4 | Set 5 | Total | Report |
|---|---|---|---|---|---|---|---|---|---|---|---|
| 23 Feb | 13:45 | Botswana | 0–3 | Egypt | 21–25 | 11–25 | 17–25 | | | 49–75 | |
| 23 Feb | 16:00 | Cameroon | 3–0 | DR Congo | 25–14 | 25–9 | 25–14 | | | 75–37 | |
| 24 Feb | 16:00 | Egypt | 3–2 | Cameroon | 25–18 | 26–28 | 25–19 | 22–25 | 18–16 | 116–106 | |
| 24 Feb | 18:15 | Nigeria | 0–3 | Algeria | 13–25 | 16–25 | 13–25 | | | 42–75 | |
| 25 Feb | 16:00 | Botswana | 3–0 | Nigeria | 25–21 | 25–18 | 25–21 | | | 75–60 | |
| 25 Feb | 18:15 | DR Congo | 0–3 | Egypt | 4–25 | 20–25 | 16–25 | | | 40–75 | |
| 26 Feb | 16:00 | Nigeria | 0–3 | Cameroon | 14–25 | 11–25 | 16–25 | | | 41–75 | |
| 26 Feb | 18:15 | Algeria | 3–0 | Botswana | 25–11 | 25–10 | 25–10 | | | 75–31 | |
| 27 Feb | 16:00 | DR Congo | 1–3 | Nigeria | 21–25 | 21–25 | 25–23 | 20–25 | | 87–98 | |
| 27 Feb | 18:15 | Cameroon | 3–1 | Algeria | 25–23 | 25–22 | 21–25 | 25–21 | | 96–91 | |
| 28 Feb | 13:45 | Botswana | 0–3 | Cameroon | 16–25 | 17–25 | 13–25 | | | 46–75 | |
| 28 Feb | 16:00 | Nigeria | 0–3 | Egypt | 8–25 | 15–25 | 11–25 | | | 34–75 | |
| 28 Feb | 18:15 | Algeria | 3–0 | DR Congo | 25–8 | 25–12 | 25–8 | | | 75–28 | |
| 01 Mar | 15:00 | DR Congo | 0–3 | Botswana | 15–25 | 19–25 | 21–25 | | | 55–75 | |
| 01 Mar | 18:15 | Egypt | 2–3 | Algeria | 25–23 | 15–25 | 25–19 | 27–29 | 10–15 | 102–111 | |

=== Pool U ===
- Venue: Safaricom Indoor Arena, Nairobi, Kenya
- Dates: February 16–22, 2014
- All times are East Africa Time (UTC+03:00)

| Pos | Team | Pld | W | L | Pts | SW | SL | SR | SPW | SPL | SPR |
|---|---|---|---|---|---|---|---|---|---|---|---|
| 1 | Tunisia | 5 | 5 | 0 | 14 | 15 | 3 | 5.000 | 430 | 327 | 1.315 |
| 2 | Kenya | 5 | 4 | 1 | 13 | 14 | 4 | 3.500 | 425 | 298 | 1.426 |
| 3 | Senegal | 5 | 3 | 2 | 9 | 11 | 8 | 1.375 | 413 | 399 | 1.035 |
| 4 | Uganda | 5 | 2 | 3 | 5 | 7 | 12 | 0.583 | 365 | 417 | 0.875 |
| 5 | Seychelles | 5 | 1 | 4 | 3 | 6 | 14 | 0.429 | 401 | 457 | 0.877 |
| 6 | Mozambique | 5 | 0 | 5 | 1 | 3 | 15 | 0.200 | 299 | 435 | 0.687 |

- Cape Verde qualified from the zonal round but withdrew.

| Date | Time | | Score | | Set 1 | Set 2 | Set 3 | Set 4 | Set 5 | Total | Report |
|---|---|---|---|---|---|---|---|---|---|---|---|
| 16 Feb | 12:00 | Mozambique | 0–3 | Tunisia | 11–25 | 12–25 | 14–25 | | | 37–75 | Report |
| 16 Feb | 14:00 | Senegal | 3–1 | Seychelles | 25–23 | 22–25 | 25–18 | 25–22 | | 97–88 | Report |
| 16 Feb | 16:00 | Kenya | 3–0 | Uganda | 25–16 | 25–10 | 25–14 | | | 75–40 | Report |
| 17 Feb | 12:00 | Uganda | 3–2 | Seychelles | 19–25 | 22–25 | 25–17 | 25–17 | 15–12 | 106–96 | Report |
| 17 Feb | 14:00 | Tunisia | 3–1 | Senegal | 25–17 | 23–25 | 25–23 | 25–15 | | 98–80 | Report |
| 17 Feb | 16:00 | Kenya | 3–0 | Mozambique | 25–12 | 25–9 | 25–19 | | | 75–40 | Report |
| 19 Feb | 12:00 | Mozambique | 1–3 | Uganda | 19–25 | 18–25 | 25–23 | 15–25 | | 77–98 | Report |
| 19 Feb | 14:00 | Seychelles | 0–3 | Tunisia | 22–25 | 20–25 | 19–25 | | | 61–75 | Report |
| 19 Feb | 16:00 | Senegal | 1–3 | Kenya | 19–25 | 12–25 | 25–17 | 11–25 | | 67–92 | Report |
| 20 Feb | 12:00 | Uganda | 0–3 | Tunisia | 14–25 | 8–25 | 19–25 | | | 41–75 | Report |
| 20 Feb | 14:00 | Mozambique | 0–3 | Senegal | 13–25 | 14–25 | 14–25 | | | 41–75 | Report |
| 20 Feb | 16:00 | Kenya | 3–0 | Seychelles | 25–13 | 25–20 | 25–11 | | | 75–44 | Report |
| 22 Feb | 12:00 | Seychelles | 3–2 | Mozambique | 24–26 | 25–22 | 25–18 | 23–25 | 15–13 | 112–104 | Report |
| 22 Feb | 14:00 | Senegal | 3–1 | Uganda | 19–25 | 25–18 | 25–15 | 25–22 | | 94–80 | Report |
| 22 Feb | 16:00 | Tunisia | 3–2 | Kenya | 25–21 | 24–26 | 15–25 | 28–26 | 15–10 | 107–108 | Report |
