= 2018 FIVB Women's Volleyball World Championship qualification (CAVB) =

The CAVB qualification for the 2018 FIVB Women's Volleyball World Championship was a competition for two places at the finals in Japan.

The CAVB Board of Administration meeting of 25 May 2017 decided to merge the 2017 Women's African Volleyball Championship and 2018 FIVB World Championship Continental Qualifiers. The top two teams from amongst the teams, who had registered with FIVB for the 2018 World Championship, will qualify to represent Africa in the 2018 FIVB Women's Volleyball World Championship.

== Pools composition ==
31 CAVB national teams entered the qualification.

=== First round ===
There are seven confederation zonal competitions. The teams were distributed according to their geographical positions. The winner of each competition competed in second round.

- Cameroon qualified to second round as host country in 2017 Women's African Volleyball Championship.
- Tunisia and Algeria qualified to second round as top two FIVB ranking teams. Ranking as per August 7, 2017 was shown in brackets.

Rank	Team
1	Tunisia (28)
2	Algeria (31)

Berths for second round

Zone	Total
Pool A	1
Pool B	2
Pool C	2
Pool D	2
Pool E	2
Pool F	2
Pool G	1

Pool A	Pool B	Pool C	Pool D	Pool E	Pool F	Pool G
Algeria	Cape Verde	Ivory Coast	Cameroon	Egypt	Botswana	~~Seychelles~~
Tunisia	Senegal	Ghana	DR Congo	Kenya	Mozambique	~~Mauritius~~
~~Libya~~	~~Gambia~~	Nigeria	~~Gabon~~	Rwanda	Eswatini	~~Madagascar~~
		~~Niger~~	~~Central African Republic~~	Uganda	~~Lesotho~~	
				~~Burundi~~	~~Malawi~~	
				~~Sudan~~	~~Namibia~~	
				~~Tanzania~~	~~Zimbabwe~~	

Note: Burundi, Gambia, Lesotho, Libya, Malawi, Namibia, Niger, Sudan, Tanzania, Zimbabwe, Gabon, Central African Republic, Seychelles, Mauritius and Madagascar withdrew from zonal qualification.

=== Second round ===
The second round is 2017 Women's African Nations championship which acts also as a qualifier for the 2018 FIVB World Championship. The top two teams from World ranking as of September 2017 and the host will direct qualify from first round. If the top two ranking teams have already qualified, the next best team from their pool would replace them in this round.

== Pool standing procedure ==
1. Number of matches won
2. Match points
3. Sets ratio
4. Points ratio
5. If the tie continues as per the point ratio between two teams, the priority will be given to the team which won the last match between them. When the tie in points ratio is between three or more teams, a new classification of these teams in the terms of points 1, 2 and 3 will be made taking into consideration only the matches in which they were opposed to each other.

Match won 3–0 or 3–1: 3 match points for the winner, 0 match points for the loser
Match won 3–2: 2 match points for the winner, 1 match point for the loser

== First round ==
=== Pool A ===
- Venue: Béjaïa, Algeria
- Dates: 9–10 September 2017, both matches in Béjaïa

Pos	Team	Pld	W	L	Pts	SW	SL	SR	SPW	SPL	SPR	Qualification
1	Tunisia	2	2	0	6	6	2	3.000	192	188	1.021	Second round
2	Algeria	2	0	2	0	2	6	0.333	188	192	0.979	Second round

Date	Time		Score		Set 1	Set 2	Set 3	Set 4	Set 5	Total	Report
9 Sep	18:00	Algeria	1–3	Tunisia	22–25	25–20	24–26	21–25		92–96	Report
10 Sep	18:00	Tunisia	3–1	Algeria	19–25	25–23	27–25	25–23		96–96	Report

Note: Tunisia and Algeria qualified to second round as top two FIVB ranking teams.

=== Pool B ===
- Venue: Gimnodesportivo Vavá Duarte, Praia, Cape Verde
- Dates: 29 August 2017

Pos	Team	Pld	W	L	Pts	SW	SL	SR	SPW	SPL	SPR	Qualification
1	Senegal	1	1	0	3	3	0	MAX	75	49	1.531	Second round
2	Cape Verde	1	0	1	0	0	3	0.000	49	75	0.653	Second round

Date	Time		Score		Set 1	Set 2	Set 3	Set 4	Set 5	Total	Report
29 Apr	19:00	Cape Verde	0–3	Senegal	13–25	20–25	16–25			49–75	Report

=== Pool C ===
- Venue: Abidjan, Ivory Coast
- Dates: 18–20 August 2017

Pos	Team	Pld	W	L	Pts	SW	SL	SR	SPW	SPL	SPR	Qualification
1	Nigeria	2	2	0	6	6	0	MAX	151	96	1.573	Second round
2	Ghana	2	1	1	3	3	4	0.750	131	151	0.868	Second round
3	Ivory Coast	2	0	2	0	1	6	0.167	132	167	0.790	

Date	Time		Score		Set 1	Set 2	Set 3	Set 4	Set 5	Total	Report
18 Aug		Ivory Coast	1–3	Ghana	17–25	16–25	25–16	18–25		76–91	Report
19 Aug		Ghana	0–3	Nigeria	16–25	17–25	7–25			40–75	Report
20 Aug		Ivory Coast	0–3	Nigeria	24–26	12–25	20–25			56–76	Report

=== Pool D ===
- DR Congo qualified for the next round. Gabon and Central Africa Republic withdrew from qualification.

Rank	Team	Qualification
1	DR Congo	Second round

=== Pool E ===
- Venue: Kasarani Indoor Arena, Nairobi, Kenya
- Dates: 28–30 July 2017

Pos	Team	Pld	W	L	Pts	SW	SL	SR	SPW	SPL	SPR	Qualification
1	Kenya	3	3	0	9	9	0	MAX	225	145	1.552	Second round
2	Egypt	3	2	1	6	6	4	1.500	223	199	1.121	Second round
3	Uganda	3	1	2	2	3	8	0.375	184	248	0.742	
4	Rwanda	3	0	3	1	3	9	0.333	238	278	0.856	

Date	Time		Score		Set 1	Set 2	Set 3	Set 4	Set 5	Total	Report
28 Jul		Rwanda	1–3	Egypt	18–25	25–21	23–25	20–25		86–96	Report
28 Jul		Kenya	3–0	Uganda	25–12	25–15	25–12			75–39	Report
29 Jul		Egypt	3–0	Uganda	25–14	25–12	25–12			75–38	Report
29 Jul		Rwanda	0–3	Kenya	22–25	16–25	16–25			54–75	Report
30 Jul		Uganda	3–2	Rwanda	23–25	19–25	25–16	25–23	15–9	107–98	Report
30 Jul		Egypt	0–3	Kenya	18–25	17–25	17–25			52–75	Report

=== Pool F ===
- Venue: Politecnica Hall, Maputo, Mozambique
- Dates: 30 June – 2 July 2017

Pos	Team	Pld	W	L	Pts	SW	SL	SR	SPW	SPL	SPR	Qualification
1	Botswana	2	2	0	6	6	0	MAX	150	94	1.596	Second round
2	Mozambique	2	1	1	2	3	5	0.600	149	176	0.847	Second round
3	Eswatini	2	0	2	1	2	6	0.333	153	182	0.841	

Date	Time		Score		Set 1	Set 2	Set 3	Set 4	Set 5	Total	Report
30 June		Mozambique	3–2	Eswatini	25–22	17–25	25–27	25–18	15–9	107–101	Report
1 July		Mozambique	0–3	Botswana	13–25	14–25	15–25			42–75	Report
2 July		Botswana	3–0	Eswatini	25–16	25–17	25–19			75–52	Report

- Mozambique qualified to second round as the runners-up of zone but later withdrew.

=== Pool G ===
- Seychelles, Mauritius and Madagascar withdrew from qualification

== 2017 Women's African Volleyball Championship ==
- Venue: Yaoundé, Cameroon
- Dates: 7–14 October 2017
- The winner and runner-up qualified for the 2018 World Championship.

Rank	Team
1st place, gold medalist(s)	Cameroon
2nd place, silver medalist(s)	Kenya
3rd place, bronze medalist(s)	Egypt
4	Senegal
5	Tunisia
6	Algeria
7	Nigeria
8	Botswana
9	DR Congo

Qualified for the 2018 World Championship
