= Volleyball at the 2015 African Games – Women's tournament =

Tournament details
- Host country: Republic of the Congo
- Dates: 2–14 September
- Teams: 12
- Venue: 1 (in Brazzaville host cities)

Final positions
- Champions: Kenya (4th title)

The Women's tournament of the volleyball competition of the 2015 African Games was held from September 4–15, 2015 in Brazzaville.

== Teams ==
- Algeria
- Egypt
- Cameroon
- Congo
- Botswana
- Senegal
- Ghana
- Kenya
- Nigeria
- Mozambique
- Cape Verde
- Seychelles

== Preliminary round ==
=== Group A ===
Pos	Team	Pld	W	L	Pts	SW	SL	SR	SPW	SPL	SPR	Qualification
1	Egypt	5	5	0	15	15	0	MAX	382	245	1.559	Semifinals
2	Seychelles	5	4	1	11	12	7	1.714	440	365	1.205	Semifinals
3	Botswana	5	3	2	7	10	8	1.250	414	399	1.038	
4	Senegal	5	2	3	7	10	10	1.000	420	429	0.979	
5	Ghana	5	1	4	3	5	12	0.417	345	396	0.871	
6	Congo	5	0	5	0	0	15	0.000	208	375	0.555	

Date		Score		Set 1	Set 2	Set 3	Set 4	Set 5	Total
2 Sep	Ghana	3–0	Congo	25–11	25–20	25–21			75–52
3 Sep	Senegal	2–3	Seychelles	17–25	19–25	25–23	25–22	16–18	102–113
3 Sep	Egypt	3–0	Botswana	32–30	25–18	25–19			82–67
5 Sep	Egypt	3–0	Congo	25–9	25–6	25–6			75–21
5 Sep	Senegal	3–1	Ghana	25–16	18–25	25–21	25–23		93–85
5 Sep	Botswana	1–3	Seychelles	16–25	21–25	25–21	23–25		85–96
7 Sep	Botswana	3–0	Congo	25–22	25–16	25–19			75–57
7 Sep	Ghana	1–3	Seychelles	26–24	14–25	14–25	17–25		71–99
7 Sep	Egypt	3–0	Senegal	25–15	25–16	25–16			75–46
9 Sep	Senegal	2–3	Botswana	17–25	25–20	21–25	25–23	15–17	103–110
9 Sep	Egypt	3–0	Ghana	25–21	25–17	25–15			75–53
9 Sep	Congo	0–3	Seychelles	6–25	13–25	13–25			32–75
11 Sep	Egypt	3–0	Seychelles	25–18	25–23	25–16			75–57
11 Sep	Botswana	3–0	Ghana	25–22	27–25	25–17			77–61
11 Sep	Senegal	3–0	Congo	25–19	25–13	25–14			75–46

=== Group B ===
Pos	Team	Pld	W	L	Pts	SW	SL	SR	SPW	SPL	SPR	Qualification
1	Cameroon	5	5	0	14	15	2	7.500	411	274	1.500	Semifinals
2	Kenya	5	4	1	13	14	4	3.500	420	337	1.246	Semifinals
3	Algeria	5	3	2	9	10	7	1.429	382	327	1.168	
4	Nigeria	5	2	3	6	7	12	0.583	337	388	0.869	
5	Cape Verde	5	1	4	2	4	14	0.286	324	423	0.766	
6	Mozambique	5	0	5	1	2	15	0.133	282	407	0.693	

Date		Score		Set 1	Set 2	Set 3	Set 4	Set 5	Total
2 Sep	Nigeria	3–0	Mozambique	25–19	25–21	25–21			75–61
2 Sep	Kenya	3–1	Algeria	23–25	25–19	25–15	25–23		98–82
3 Sep	Cameroon	3–0	Cape Verde	25–18	25–11	25–12			75–41
6 Sep	Kenya	2–3	Cameroon	27–25	25–21	15–25	19–25	9–15	95–111
6 Sep	Mozambique	2–3	Cape Verde	25–27	25–16	23–25	26–24	6–15	105–107
6 Sep	Algeria	3–1	Nigeria	21–25	25–12	25–13	25–15		96–55
8 Sep	Kenya	3–0	Nigeria	25–16	25–17	25–19			75–52
8 Sep	Algeria	3–0	Cape Verde	25–13	25–19	25–11			75–43
8 Sep	Cameroon	3–0	Mozambique	25–9	25–11	25–10			75–30
10 Sep	Kenya	3–0	Mozambique	25–12	25–13	25–15			75–40
10 Sep	Algeria	0–3	Cameroon	19–25	15–25	20–25			54–75
10 Sep	Nigeria	3–1	Cape Verde	25–19	16–25	25–21	25–16		91–81
12 Sep	Kenya	3–0	Cape Verde	25–13	25–14	27–25			77–52
12 Sep	Nigeria	0–3	Cameroon	15–25	19–25	20–25			75–54
12 Sep	Algeria	3–0	Mozambique	25–16	25–19	25–11			75–46

== Final round ==
=== Semifinals ===
Date		Score		Set 1	Set 2	Set 3	Set 4	Set 5	Total
13 Sep	Cameroon	3–0	Seychelles	25–21	25–22	25–23			75–66
13 Sep	Egypt	2–3	Kenya	21-25	26–24	26–24	14–25	11-15	98–113

=== Third place game ===
Date		Score		Set 1	Set 2	Set 3	Set 4	Set 5	Total
14 Sep	Seychelles	0-3	Egypt	17–25	6-25	15–25			38–75

=== Final ===
Date		Score		Set 1	Set 2	Set 3	Set 4	Set 5	Total
14 Sep	Cameroon	1-3	Kenya	25–15	14–25	15–25	19-25		73–90

== See also ==
- Volleyball at the 2015 African Games – Men's tournament
