= 2005 Women's African Volleyball Championship =

Tournament details
- Host country: Nigeria
- City: Abuja
- Dates: 8 – 15 September
- Teams: 8
- Venue: 1 (in 1 host city)

Final positions
- Champions: Kenya (5th title)

Tournament awards
- MVP: (Egypt) Tahani Toson

Tournament statistics
- Matches played: 18

The 2005 Women's African Nations Championship was the 12th edition of the Women's African Volleyball Championship organised by Africa's governing volleyball body, the Confédération Africaine de Volleyball. It was held in Abuja, Nigeria, from 8 to 15 September 2005.

Kenya won the championship defeating Nigeria in the final, while Egypt defeated Tunisia to finish third.

== Competing nations ==
The following national teams have confirmed participation:

- Botswana
- Cameroon
- Egypt
- Ivory Coast
- Kenya
- Morocco
- Nigeria
- Tunisia

== Venue ==
Abuja, Nigeria	2005 Women's African Volleyball Championship is located in Nigeria
National Stadium indoor Hall	2005 Women's African Volleyball Championship is located in Nigeria
Capacity: 3,000	2005 Women's African Volleyball Championship is located in Nigeria

== Format ==
The tournament is played in two stages. In the first stage, the participants are divided in two groups. A single round-robin format is played within each group to determine the teams' group position (as per procedure below).

The second stage is a knockout format, the top two teams in each group advance to the semifinals, third placed teams in each group play for 5th-6th and fourth placed teams in each group play for 7th-8th place. Winners of the semifinals play the final, while losers play for third and fourth places.

=== Pool standing procedure ===
1. Match points (win = 2 points, loss = 1 point)
2. Number of matches won
3. Sets ratio
4. Points ratio

== Pool composition ==
The drawing of lots was held in Abuja, Nigeria on 7 September 2005.

Pool A	Pool B
Nigeria	Egypt
Botswana	Kenya
Cameroon	Ivory Coast
Tunisia	Morocco

== Group stage ==
=== Group A ===
Pos	Team	Pld	W	L	Pts	SW	SL	SR	SPW	SPL	SPR	Qualification
1	Nigeria	3	3	0	6	9	2	4.500	0	0	—	Semifinals
2	Tunisia	3	2	1	5	8	5	1.600	0	0	—	Semifinals
3	Cameroon	3	1	2	4	5	6	0.833	223	242	0.921	
4	Botswana	3	0	3	3	0	9	0.000	151	225	0.671	

Date	Time		Score		Set 1	Set 2	Set 3	Set 4	Set 5	Total	Report
8 Sep		Nigeria	3–0	Botswana	25–18	25–19	25–21			75–58	Report
9 Sep		Tunisia	3–2	Cameroon	22–25	25–22	25–14	25–27	16–14	113–102	Report
10 Sep		Tunisia	3–0	Botswana	25–12	25–7	25–20			75–39	
10 Sep		Nigeria	3–0	Cameroon	25–17	25–15	25–14			75–46	
11 Sep		Cameroon	3–0	Botswana	25–14	25–17	25–23			75–54	
11 Sep		Nigeria	3–2	Tunisia	–	–	–	–	–	0–0	

=== Group B ===
Pos	Team	Pld	W	L	Pts	SW	SL	SR	SPW	SPL	SPR	Qualification
1	Kenya	3	3	0	6	9	1	9.000	0	0	—	Semifinals
2	Egypt	3	2	1	5	7	3	2.333	0	0	—	Semifinals
3	Morocco	3	1	2	4	3	6	0.500	0	0	—	
4	Ivory Coast	3	0	3	3	0	9	0.000	0	0	—	

Date	Time		Score		Set 1	Set 2	Set 3	Set 4	Set 5	Total	Report
9 Sep		Egypt	3–0	Ivory Coast	25–4	25–10	25–10			75–24	Report
9 Sep		Kenya	3–0	Morocco	25–12	25–11	26–24			76–47	Report
10 Sep		Morocco	3–0	Ivory Coast	25–9	25–8	25–9			75–26	Report
10 Sep		Kenya	3–1	Egypt	25–16	28–30	25–20	25–19		103–85	Report
11 Sep		Kenya	3–0	Ivory Coast	–	–	–			0–0	
11 Sep		Egypt	3–0	Morocco	–	–	–			0–0	

== Final round ==
Semi finals
13 September
Kenya	3
Tunisia	2
13 September
Nigeria	3
Egypt	1

Final
15 September
Kenya	3
Nigeria	1
3rd place
14 September
Egypt	3
Tunisia	2

=== Semifinals ===
Date	Time		Score		Set 1	Set 2	Set 3	Set 4	Set 5	Total	Report
13 Sep		Kenya	3–2	Tunisia	25–15	21–25	20–25	25–10	15–13	106–88	Report
13 Sep		Nigeria	3–1	Egypt	25–17	20–25	25–23	26–24		96–89	Report

=== 7th place match ===
Date	Time		Score		Set 1	Set 2	Set 3	Set 4	Set 5	Total	Report
14 Sep		Botswana	3–0	Ivory Coast	25–9	25–12	25–16			75–37	Report

=== 5th place match ===
Date	Time		Score		Set 1	Set 2	Set 3	Set 4	Set 5	Total	Report
14 Sep		Cameroon	3–0	Morocco	25–20	25–12	25–20			75–52	Report

=== 3rd place match ===
Date	Time		Score		Set 1	Set 2	Set 3	Set 4	Set 5	Total	Report
14 Sep		Egypt	3–2	Tunisia	22–25	25–27	25–21	25–17	15–9	112–99	Report

=== Final ===
Date	Time		Score		Set 1	Set 2	Set 3	Set 4	Set 5	Total	Report
15 Sep		Kenya	3–1	Nigeria	19–25	25–22	25–21	25–17		94–85	Report

== Final standing ==
Rank	Team
1st place, gold medalist(s)	Kenya
2nd place, silver medalist(s)	Nigeria
3rd place, bronze medalist(s)	Egypt
4	Tunisia
5	Cameroon
6	Morocco
7	Botswana
8	Ivory Coast

Source: CAVB.

2005 Women's African champions

Kenya
5th title

== Awards ==
- MVP
  (Egypt) Tahani Toson
- Best setter
  (Tunisia) Asma Ben Sheikh
- Best receiver
  (Tunisia) Wafa Monter
- Best digger
  (Tunisia) Arabia Rafrafi
- Best spiker
  (Tunisia) Nihel Ghoul
- Best blocker
  (Egypt) Ingy El-Shamy
- Best server
  (Tunisia) Asma Ben Sheikh

Source: CAVB.
