= Madelaynne Montaño =

Colombian volleyball player

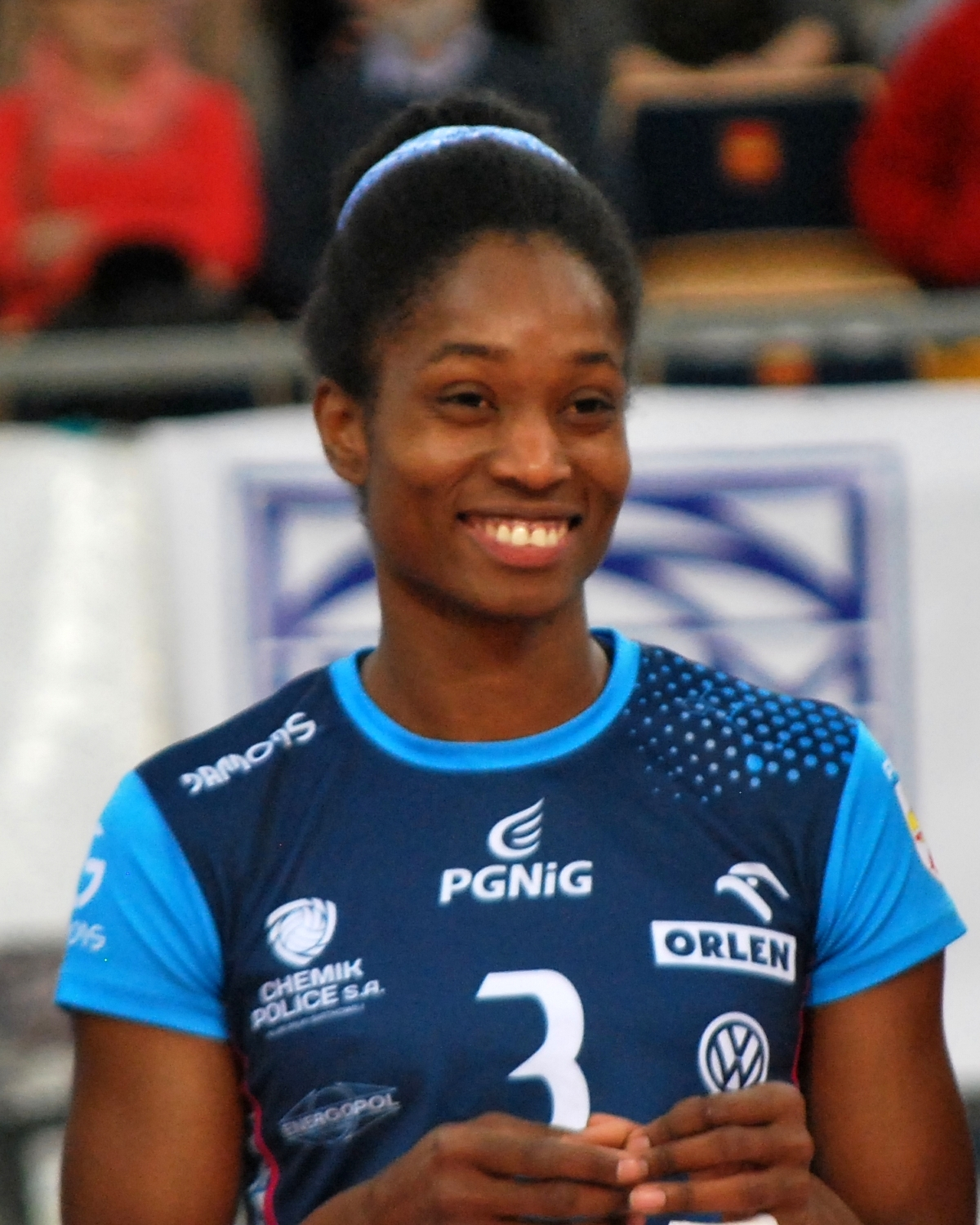

Personal information
- Full name: Madelaynne Montaño Caicedo
- Nationality: Colombian
- Born: January 6, 1983 (age 43); Tuluá, Valle del Cauca, Colombia
- Height: 1.90 m (6 ft 3 in)
- Weight: 68 kg (150 lb)
- Spike: 338 cm (133 in)
- Block: 315 cm (124 in)

Volleyball information
- Position: Opposite
- Current club: Chemik Police
- Number: 7, 3

National team
2009–2016	Colombia
- Last updated: June 2012

Madelaynne Montaño Caicedo (born January 6, 1983, in Tuluá, Valle del Cauca) is a volleyball player from Colombia, who won the silver medal at the 2012 FIVB Club World Championship playing with Rabita Baku.

Montaño won the South Korean V-League in the 2009/10 season with KT&G Daejeon and the 2012–13 Azerbaijan Super League playing with Rabita Baku. She won the Most Valuable Player award in both times.

== Personal life ==
Montaño started playing basketball at school. She has a son.

== Career ==
After playing as junior, Montaño played since 1996 in Colombian Liga del Valle. After the 1998 South American Junior Championship, she was approached by the Argentinian club Boca Juniors, but she signed with the Argentinian League club San Fernando de Catamarca for the 1998/99 season.

From Argentina she went to Miami Dade College. There she studied military psychology and played in the volleyball team from 2002 to 2003, winning the NJCAA National Championship in 2002, being chosen among the All-Tournament Team and also was the AVCA Two-year Colleges National Player of the Year award. For the 2003 season, the Miami Dade College team finished in 3rd place after falling in the semifinal game from Southwest Missouri State and beating the College of Southern Idaho for the Bronze medal match. In that tournament Madelaynne was awarded among the All-Tournament Team and Best Scorer, Best Spiker and Best Server. After playing in the Miami Dade College, she participated in the Volleyball Tournament of the 2004 National Games, winning the Silver Medal representing the Valle region.

Montaño signed in Greece to play for two years in the Greek A1 League team Aris Thessaloniki. With this team she finished in third place for the 2004/2005 League Championship and second in the Greek Cup. After the 2005/2006 season, Madelaynne took sabbatical time due to maternity, coming back to play in the other Thessaloniki team, Iraklis Thessaloniki for the 2008/2009 A1 Season. In 2009 Montaño joined the South Korean club KT&G Daejeon, winning the 2009/2010 League Championship and the "Most Valuable Player" award.

=== 2011 ===
Playing with her South Korean club, KT&G Hungkuk, Montaño scored 53 points against GS Caltex from the South Korean V-League.

At the end of the 2010–2011 club season, Montaño finished in second place in the Most Valuable Player voting poll.

Alongside international player Kenny Moreno, Montaño accepted to play with the Colombia National team, to pursuit the team qualification for the 2012 Olympics.

For her achievements in the 2010/2011 season, Montaño was one of the finalists for the Colombian Sportswoman of the Year award, ultimately won by champion cyclist Mariana Pajón.

In her first official international tournament with her national team, Montaño finished 4th at the 2011 South American Championship and was awarded Best Scorer of the tournament.

=== 2012 ===
She signed for Rabita Baku to play the 2012/2013 season. Montaño won the silver medal in the 2012 FIVB Club World Championship, playing with the Azerbaijani club Rabita Baku.

=== 2013 ===
Montaño's club, Rabita Baku won the Azerbaijan Super League Championship winning their sixth title in a row. She won the league's Most Valuable Player award.

Soon after the end of the Azerbaijani Super League, Montaño signed with the Turkish club Galatasaray Daikin.

Montaño earn the Most Valuable Player of the South American Championship with the National Team, which ranked in 4th place and helping her team to qualify for the 2014 South American World Championship Qualification Tournament.

== Clubs ==
- (Argentina) San Fernando de Catamarca (1998–1999)
- (Greece) Aris Thessaloniki (2004–2006)
- (Greece) Iraklis Thessaloniki (2008–2009)
- (South Korea) KT&G Daejeon (2009–2012)
- (Azerbaijan) Rabita Baku (2012–2013)
- (Turkey) Galatasaray Daikin (2013–2014)
- (Turkey) Fenerbahçe Istanbul (2014–2015)
- (Poland) Chemik Police (2015–2017)
- (Greece) Aris Thessaloniki (2018–)

== Awards ==
=== Individuals ===
- 2009–10 South Korean V-League Regular Season "Most Valuable Player"
- 2011 South American Championship "Best Scorer"
- 2012 Summer Olympics South American qualification tournament "Best Scorer"
- 2012–13 CEV Champions League "Best Scorer"
- 2012–13 Azerbaijan Super League "Most Valuable Player"
- 2013 South American Championship "Most Valuable Player"

==== College ====
- 2002 – AVCA NJCAA Player of the Year
- 2002 NJCAA National Championship All-Tournament Team
- 2002 NJCAA National Championship
- 2003 NJCAA National Championship Best Scorer
- 2003 NJCAA National Championship Best Spiker
- 2003 NJCAA National Championship Best Server
- 2003 NJCAA National Championship All-Tournament Team

=== Clubs ===
- 2008–09 Greek Cup – Runner-Up, with Iraklis Thessaloniki
- 2009–10 South Korean V-League – Champion, with KT&G Daejeon
- 2012 FIVB Club World Championship – Runner-Up, with Rabita Baku
- 2012–13 CEV Champions League – Runner-Up, with Rabita Baku
- 2012–13 Azerbaijan Super League- Champion, with Rabita Baku
- 2014–15 Turkish Women's Volleyball League – Champion, with Fenerbahçe Grundig Istanbul
- 2016–17 Polish Volleyball League – Champion, with KPS Chemik Police

Awards
Preceded by (Brazil) Sheilla Castro	Most Valuable Player of South American Championship; 2013	Succeeded by (Brazil) Gabriela Guimarães
