= Toson =

Toson may refer to:

- Tōson Shimazaki (1872-1943), a Japanese author
- Tosŏn (826-898), a Korean Buddhist monk and geomancer
- Tahani Toson (born 1971), Egyptian volleyball player
