= Tahani =

Tahani is a given name. It may refer to:

- Tahani al-Gebali (born 1950), Egyptian judge
- Tahani Rached, Canadian Egyptian documentary filmmaker
- Tahani Toson (born 1971), Egyptian volleyball player

== See also ==
- Tahani Al-Jamil (The Good Place character), character in The Good Place
- "Tahani Al-Jamil" (The Good Place episode), third episode of season 1 of the series
