= 2014 FIVB Women's Volleyball World Championship qualification (AVC) =

The AVC qualification for the 2014 FIVB Women's Volleyball World Championship saw member nations compete for four places at the finals in Italy.

== Draw ==
16 AVC national teams entered qualification. (North Korea later withdrew) The teams were distributed according to their geographical positions. Teams ranked 1–5 in FIVB World Rankings do not compete in the zonal rounds, and automatically qualify for the final round. Australia and New Zealand also qualified automatically since no other team registered in Oceania zone.

Berths for final round

Zone	Total	Automatic	Remaining
Central	2	1	1
Eastern	4	3	1
Oceania	2	0	2
Southeastern	2	1	1

Zonal round

Central	Eastern	Southeastern
India; Uzbekistan	Chinese Taipei; Hong Kong; ~~North Korea~~	Indonesia; Myanmar; Philippines; Vietnam

Final round

The ten remaining teams were distributed according to their position in the FIVB Senior Women's Rankings as of 23 January 2013 using the serpentine system for their distribution. (Rankings shown in brackets)

Pool A	Pool B
Japan (3); Thailand (12); Chinese Taipei (28); Vietnam (93); Australia (103)	China (5); South Korea (11); Kazakhstan (30); New Zealand (71); India (103)

== Zonal round ==
=== Central ===
- Venue: Nakhon Pathom Sports Center Gymnasium, Nakhon Pathom, Thailand
- Dates: June 26, 2013
- All times are Indochina Time (UTC+07:00)

Pos	Team	Pld	W	L	Pts	SW	SL	SR	SPW	SPL	SPR	Qualification
1	India	1	1	0	3	3	0	MAX	76	57	1.333	Final round
2	Uzbekistan	1	0	1	0	0	3	0.000	57	76	0.750	

Date	Time		Score		Set 1	Set 2	Set 3	Set 4	Set 5	Total	Report
26 Jun	14:00	Uzbekistan	0–3	India	19–25	14–25	24–26			57–76	Report

=== Eastern ===
- Venue: Taipei Gymnasium, Taipei, Taiwan
- Dates: June 28, 2013
- All times are Chungyuan Standard Time (UTC+08:00)

Pos	Team	Pld	W	L	Pts	SW	SL	SR	SPW	SPL	SPR	Qualification
1	Chinese Taipei	1	1	0	3	3	0	MAX	75	45	1.667	Final round
2	Hong Kong	1	0	1	0	0	3	0.000	45	75	0.600	

Date	Time		Score		Set 1	Set 2	Set 3	Set 4	Set 5	Total	Report
28 Jun	17:00	Hong Kong	0–3	Chinese Taipei	15–25	20–25	10–25			45–75	Report

=== Southeastern ===
- Venue: Đà Lạt Gymnasium, Đà Lạt, Vietnam
- Dates: June 14–16, 2013
- All times are Indochina Time (UTC+07:00)

Pos	Team	Pld	W	L	Pts	SW	SL	SR	SPW	SPL	SPR	Qualification
1	Vietnam	3	3	0	9	9	1	9.000	249	154	1.617	Final round
2	Indonesia	3	2	1	6	7	3	2.333	237	213	1.113	
3	Philippines	3	1	2	3	3	7	0.429	194	216	0.898	
4	Myanmar	3	0	3	0	1	9	0.111	148	245	0.604	

Date	Time		Score		Set 1	Set 2	Set 3	Set 4	Set 5	Total	Report
14 Jun	16:00	Myanmar	0–3	Indonesia	21–25	17–25	15–25			53–75	Report
14 Jun	19:00	Vietnam	3–0	Philippines	25–9	25–11	25–18			75–38	Report
15 Jun	16:00	Myanmar	1–3	Philippines	25–20	14–25	10–25	17–25		66–95	Report
15 Jun	19:00	Indonesia	1–3	Vietnam	27–29	25–20	15–25	20–25		87–99	Report
16 Jun	16:00	Philippines	0–3	Indonesia	20–25	19–25	22–25			61–75	Report
16 Jun	19:00	Myanmar	0–3	Vietnam	11–25	8–25	10–25			29–75	Report

== Final round ==
=== Pool A ===
- Venue: Park Arena, Komaki, Japan
- Dates: September 4–8, 2013
- All times are Japan Standard Time (UTC+09:00)

Pos	Team	Pld	W	L	Pts	SW	SL	SR	SPW	SPL	SPR	Qualification
1	Japan	4	4	0	12	12	0	MAX	300	181	1.657	2014 World Championship
2	Thailand	4	3	1	9	9	3	3.000	279	209	1.335	2014 World Championship
3	Vietnam	4	2	2	6	6	7	0.857	265	261	1.015	
4	Chinese Taipei	4	1	3	3	3	9	0.333	205	281	0.730	
5	Australia	4	0	4	0	1	12	0.083	206	323	0.638	

Date	Time		Score		Set 1	Set 2	Set 3	Set 4	Set 5	Total	Report
04 Sep	16:00	Thailand	3–0	Australia	25–17	25–15	25–17			75–49	Report
04 Sep	19:15	Japan	3–0	Chinese Taipei	25–19	25–15	25–10			75–44	Report
05 Sep	14:30	Chinese Taipei	3–0	Australia	25–15	25–19	25–22			75–56	Report
05 Sep	19:35	Japan	3–0	Vietnam	25–9	25–16	25–20			75–45	Report
06 Sep	16:00	Thailand	3–0	Chinese Taipei	25–18	25–9	25–11			75–38	Report
06 Sep	19:00	Australia	1–3	Vietnam	8–25	14–25	25–23	16–25		63–98	Report
07 Sep	16:30	Vietnam	0–3	Thailand	17–25	12–25	18–25			47–75	Report
07 Sep	19:20	Japan	3–0	Australia	25–12	25–15	25–11			75–38	Report
08 Sep	11:00	Chinese Taipei	0–3	Vietnam	17–25	10–25	21–25			48–75	Report
08 Sep	14:00	Japan	3–0	Thailand	25–23	25–21	25–10			75–54	Report

=== Pool B ===
- Venue: Chenzhou Olympic Sports Centre, Chenzhou, China
- Dates: September 27– October 1, 2013
- All times are China Standard Time (UTC+08:00)

Pos	Team	Pld	W	L	Pts	SW	SL	SR	SPW	SPL	SPR	Qualification
1	China	4	4	0	12	12	0	MAX	300	132	2.273	2014 World Championship
2	Kazakhstan	4	3	1	9	9	4	2.250	283	225	1.258	2014 World Championship
3	South Korea	4	2	2	6	7	6	1.167	280	250	1.120	
4	India	4	1	3	3	3	9	0.333	191	271	0.705	
5	New Zealand	4	0	4	0	0	12	0.000	124	300	0.413	

Date	Time		Score		Set 1	Set 2	Set 3	Set 4	Set 5	Total	Report
27 Sep	16:00	New Zealand	0–3	South Korea	9–25	8–25	10–25			27–75	Report
27 Sep	19:30	India	0–3	China	7–25	8–25	10–25			25–75	Report
28 Sep	16:00	South Korea	1–3	Kazakhstan	25–21	22–25	17–25	14–25		78–96	Report
28 Sep	18:30	China	3–0	New Zealand	25–4	25–7	25–7			75–18	Report
29 Sep	16:00	South Korea	3–0	India	25–15	25–19	25–18			75–52	Report
29 Sep	19:30	Kazakhstan	3–0	New Zealand	25–12	25–14	25–7			75–33	Report
30 Sep	16:00	New Zealand	0–3	India	18–25	13–25	15–25			46–75	Report
30 Sep	19:30	Kazakhstan	0–3	China	12–25	8–25	17–25			37–75	Report
01 Oct	16:00	India	0–3	Kazakhstan	9–25	19–25	11–25			39–75	Report
01 Oct	19:30	China	3–0	South Korea	25–18	25–17	25–17			75–52	Report
