= 2014 FIVB Women's Volleyball World Championship =

Volleyball competition held in Italy

2014 FIVB Women's World Championship
Campionato Mondiale Di Pallavolo Femminile Italia 2014

Tournament details
- Host country: Italy
- Dates: 23 September – 12 October
- Teams: 24
- Venues: 6 (in 6 host cities)
- Officially opened by: Giorgio Napolitano

Final positions
- Champions: United States (1st title)
- Runners-up: China
- Third place: Brazil
- Fourth place: Italy

Tournament awards
- MVP: (United States) Kimberly Hill
- Best Setter: (United States) Alisha Glass
- Best OH: (China) Zhu Ting (United States) Kimberly Hill
- Best MB: (Brazil) Thaísa Menezes (China) Yang Junjing
- Best OPP: (Brazil) Sheilla Castro
- Best Libero: (Italy) Monica De Gennaro

The 2014 FIVB Women's World Championship was the seventeenth edition of the competition, contested by the 24 senior women's national teams of the members of the Fédération Internationale de Volleyball (FIVB), the sport's global governing body. The final tournament was held from 23 September to 12 October 2014 in Italy.

The United States won their first world title, defeating China in four sets at the final. Reigning Olympic champions Brazil won the 3rd place match, defeating Italy in five sets. Kimberly Hill was selected Most Valuable Player.

== Qualification ==
The regional qualification stage determined the 24 teams competing in the championship competition. Hosts Italy were granted automatic qualification. Regional governing bodies were allocated the remaining 23 spots. Africa was granted two, Asia and Oceania four, North, Central America and Caribbean six, South America two, and Europe ten places (including hosts).

| Country | Confederation | Qualified as | Qualified on | Previous appearances | | |
| Country | Confederation | Qualified as | Qualified on | Total* | First | Last |
|---|---|---|---|---|---|---|
| Italy | CEV | Host | 25 November 2009 | 10th | 1978 | 2010 |
| Thailand | AVC | AVC Pool A Runner-up | 7 September 2013 | 4th | 1998 | 2010 |
| Japan | AVC | AVC Pool A Winner | 7 September 2013 | 15th | 1960 | 2010 |
| Russia | CEV | 2013 CEV Championship Winner | 13 September 2013 | 16th^{1} | 1952 | 2010 |
| Germany | CEV | 2013 CEV Championship Runner-up | 13 September 2013 | 14th^{2} | 1956 | 2010 |
| Brazil | CSV | 2013 CSV Championship Winner | 21 September 2013 | 15th | 1956 | 2010 |
| China | AVC | AVC Pool B Winner | 30 September 2013 | 13th | 1956 | 2010 |
| Kazakhstan | AVC | AVC Pool B Runner-up | 1 October 2013 | 3rd | 2006 | 2010 |
| Argentina | CSV | CSV Qualification Tournament Winner | 20 October 2013 | 5th | 1960 | 2002 |
| Turkey | CEV | CEV Pool I Winner | 5 January 2014 | 3rd | 2006 | 2010 |
| Bulgaria | CEV | CEV Pool M Winner | 5 January 2014 | 11th | 1952 | 2002 |
| Azerbaijan | CEV | CEV Pool J Winner | 5 January 2014 | 3rd | 1994 | 2006 |
| Belgium | CEV | CEV Pool K Winner | 5 January 2014 | 3rd | 1956 | 1978 |
| Croatia | CEV | CEV Pool L Winner | 5 January 2014 | 3rd | 1998 | 2010 |
| Serbia | CEV | CEV Third Round Best Runner-up | 5 January 2014 | 4th^{3} | 1978 | 2010 |
| Netherlands | CEV | CEV Third Round Second Best Runner-up | 5 January 2014 | 13th | 1956 | 2010 |
| Tunisia | CAVB | CAVB Pool U Winner | 22 February 2014 | 3rd | 1978 | 1986 |
| Cameroon | CAVB | CAVB Pool T Winner | 1 March 2014 | 2nd | 2006 | 2006 |
| Cuba | NORCECA | NORCECA Pool Q Winner | 17 May 2014 | 12th | 1970 | 2010 |
| United States | NORCECA | NORCECA Pool O Winner | 18 May 2014 | 15th | 1956 | 2010 |
| Dominican Republic | NORCECA | NORCECA Pool P Winner | 18 May 2014 | 7th | 1974 | 2010 |
| Canada | NORCECA | NORCECA Pool S Winner | 19 May 2014 | 8th | 1974 | 2010 |
| Puerto Rico | NORCECA | NORCECA Pool R Winner | 25 May 2014 | 6th | 1974 | 2010 |
| Mexico | NORCECA | NORCECA Playoff Winner | 20 July 2014 | 7th | 1970 | 2006 |

* Total (including 2014 edition).
1.Competed as Soviet Union from 1952 to 1990; 6th appearance as Russia.
2.Competed as West Germany from 1956 to 1990; 6th appearance as Germany.
3.Competed as Yugoslavia for 1978 and Serbia and Montenegro for 2006; 2nd appearance as Serbia.

== Venues ==
The tournament was played at six venues in six cities.

| Pool G, H, Final round | Pool A | Pool B, E | Host cities in Italy |
| Milan | Rome | Trieste | Host cities in Italy |
| Mediolanum Forum | PalaLottomatica | PalaTrieste | Host cities in Italy |
| Capacity: 12,657 | Capacity: 10,710 | Capacity: 6,943 | Host cities in Italy |
| Pool C, F | Pool F | Pool D, E | Host cities in Italy |
| Verona | Modena | Bari | Host cities in Italy |
| PalaOlimpia | PalaPanini | PalaFlorio | Host cities in Italy |
| Capacity: 6,200 | Capacity: 4,990 | Capacity: 5,080 | Host cities in Italy |

== Format ==
The tournament was played in three different stages (first, second and third rounds). In the First round, the 24 participants were divided in four groups of six teams each. A single round-robin format was played within each group to determine the teams group position, the four best teams of each group (total of 16 teams) progressed to the next round.

In the Second round, the 16 teams were divided in two groups of eight teams (four teams from groups A and D in one group, and four teams from groups B and C in the other group). A single round-robin format was played within each group to determine the teams group position, matches already played between teams in the First round were counted in this round. The three best teams of each group (total of 6 teams) progressed to the next round.

In the Third round, the 6 teams were divided in two groups of three teams. A single round-robin format was played within each group to determine the teams group position, the two best teams of each group (total of 4 teams) progressed to the semifinals.

Group standing criteria
1. Ranking points (3 points for a 3–0 or 3–1 win; 2 points for a 3–2 win; 1 point for a 2–3 loss; 0 points for a 1–3 or 0–3 loss)
2. Number of wins
3. Sets ratio
4. Points ratio
5. Head to head

Source: FIVB

== Pools composition ==
Teams were seeded in the first three positions of each pool following the Serpentine system according to their FIVB World Ranking. FIVB reserved the right to seed the hosts as head of Pool A regardless of the World Ranking. All teams not seeded were drawn to take other available positions in the remaining lines, following the World Ranking. The drawing was held in Parma, Italy on 10 March 2014. Because NORCECA qualification were in progress on 10 March 2014, FIVB used the best world rankings of NORCECA when the draw was made. Ranking shown in brackets except Hosts which rank 4th.

| Pool A | Pool B | Pool C | Pool D |
|---|---|---|---|
| Italy (4, Host) | Brazil (1) | United States (2) | Japan (3) |
| Dominican Republic (8) | Serbia (7) | Russia (6) | China (5) |
| Germany (9) | Turkey (11) | Thailand (12) | Puerto Rico (17) |
| Argentina (18) | Canada (20) | Netherlands (18) | Cuba (21) |
| Croatia (24) | Cameroon (26) | Kazakhstan (23) | Belgium (22) |
| Tunisia (27) | Bulgaria (35) | Mexico (28) | Azerbaijan (37) |

== Results ==
All times are Central European Summer Time (UTC+02:00).

=== First round ===
==== Pool A ====
Venue: PalaLottomatica, Rome

| Pos | Team | Pld | W | L | Pts | SW | SL | SR | SPW | SPL | SPR | Qualification |
|---|---|---|---|---|---|---|---|---|---|---|---|---|
| 1 | Italy | 5 | 4 | 1 | 13 | 14 | 4 | 3.500 | 416 | 299 | 1.391 | Second round |
| 2 | Dominican Republic | 5 | 5 | 0 | 12 | 15 | 7 | 2.143 | 492 | 422 | 1.166 | Second round |
| 3 | Croatia | 5 | 3 | 2 | 9 | 11 | 10 | 1.100 | 442 | 444 | 0.995 | Second round |
| 4 | Germany | 5 | 2 | 3 | 8 | 11 | 9 | 1.222 | 431 | 363 | 1.187 | Second round |
| 5 | Argentina | 5 | 1 | 4 | 3 | 5 | 12 | 0.417 | 328 | 404 | 0.812 | |
| 6 | Tunisia | 5 | 0 | 5 | 0 | 1 | 15 | 0.067 | 219 | 396 | 0.553 | |

| Date | Time | | Score | | Set 1 | Set 2 | Set 3 | Set 4 | Set 5 | Total | Report |
|---|---|---|---|---|---|---|---|---|---|---|---|
| 23 Sep | 10:30 | Argentina | 1–3 | Croatia | 17–25 | 28–26 | 24–26 | 19–25 | | 88–102 | P2 P3 |
| 23 Sep | 17:00 | Dominican Republic | 3–2 | Germany | 22–25 | 25–21 | 25–21 | 24–26 | 15–13 | 111–106 | P2 P3 |
| 23 Sep | 20:00 | Italy | 3–0 | Tunisia | 25–11 | 25–13 | 25–8 | | | 75–32 | P2 P3 |
| 24 Sep | 10:30 | Dominican Republic | 3–0 | Tunisia | 25–14 | 25–19 | 25–10 | | | 75–43 | P2 P3 |
| 24 Sep | 17:00 | Germany | 3–0 | Argentina | 25–12 | 25–13 | 25–14 | | | 75–39 | P2 P3 |
| 24 Sep | 20:00 | Croatia | 0–3 | Italy | 24–26 | 15–25 | 11–25 | | | 50–76 | P2 P3 |
| 25 Sep | 10:30 | Germany | 3–0 | Tunisia | 25–7 | 25–12 | 25–7 | | | 75–26 | P2 P3 |
| 25 Sep | 17:00 | Croatia | 2–3 | Dominican Republic | 22–25 | 13–25 | 25–22 | 26–24 | 17–19 | 103–115 | P2 P3 |
| 25 Sep | 20:00 | Argentina | 0–3 | Italy | 17–25 | 17–25 | 16–25 | | | 50–75 | P2 P3 |
| 27 Sep | 10:30 | Tunisia | 1–3 | Croatia | 6–25 | 25–21 | 16–25 | 13–25 | | 60–96 | P2 P3 |
| 27 Sep | 17:00 | Dominican Republic | 3–1 | Argentina | 25–13 | 25–20 | 19–25 | 25–18 | | 94–76 | P2 P3 |
| 27 Sep | 20:00 | Italy | 3–1 | Germany | 21–25 | 25–17 | 25–10 | 25–18 | | 96–70 | P2 P3 |
| 28 Sep | 10:30 | Tunisia | 0–3 | Argentina | 19–25 | 18–25 | 21–25 | | | 58–75 | P2 P3 |
| 28 Sep | 17:00 | Croatia | 3–2 | Germany | 17–25 | 25–23 | 9–25 | 25–21 | 15–11 | 91–105 | P2 P3 |
| 28 Sep | 20:00 | Italy | 2–3 | Dominican Republic | 15–25 | 25–16 | 21–25 | 25–16 | 8–15 | 94–97 | P2 P3 |

==== Pool B ====
Venue: PalaTrieste, Trieste

| Pos | Team | Pld | W | L | Pts | SW | SL | SR | SPW | SPL | SPR | Qualification |
|---|---|---|---|---|---|---|---|---|---|---|---|---|
| 1 | Brazil | 5 | 5 | 0 | 14 | 15 | 3 | 5.000 | 428 | 333 | 1.285 | Second round |
| 2 | Serbia | 5 | 4 | 1 | 11 | 13 | 7 | 1.857 | 467 | 405 | 1.153 | Second round |
| 3 | Bulgaria | 5 | 3 | 2 | 9 | 11 | 8 | 1.375 | 417 | 396 | 1.053 | Second round |
| 4 | Turkey | 5 | 2 | 3 | 8 | 11 | 9 | 1.222 | 436 | 396 | 1.101 | Second round |
| 5 | Canada | 5 | 1 | 4 | 3 | 4 | 13 | 0.308 | 296 | 392 | 0.755 | |
| 6 | Cameroon | 5 | 0 | 5 | 0 | 1 | 15 | 0.067 | 274 | 396 | 0.692 | |

| Date | Time | | Score | | Set 1 | Set 2 | Set 3 | Set 4 | Set 5 | Total | Report |
|---|---|---|---|---|---|---|---|---|---|---|---|
| 23 Sep | 10:30 | Canada | 3–1 | Cameroon | 25–12 | 25–15 | 20–25 | 25–14 | | 95–66 | P2 P3 |
| 23 Sep | 17:00 | Serbia | 3–1 | Turkey | 25–15 | 20–25 | 25–19 | 25–22 | | 95–81 | P2 P3 |
| 23 Sep | 20:00 | Brazil | 3–0 | Bulgaria | 25–19 | 25–22 | 25–16 | | | 75–57 | P2 P3 |
| 24 Sep | 10:30 | Turkey | 3–0 | Canada | 25–10 | 25–12 | 25–17 | | | 75–39 | P2 P3 |
| 24 Sep | 17:00 | Cameroon | 0–3 | Brazil | 14–25 | 15–25 | 18–25 | | | 47–75 | P2 P3 |
| 24 Sep | 20:00 | Serbia | 3–2 | Bulgaria | 25–19 | 23–25 | 25–19 | 18–25 | 15–12 | 106–100 | P2 P3 |
| 25 Sep | 10:30 | Canada | 0–3 | Brazil | 14–25 | 8–25 | 18–25 | | | 40–75 | P2 P3 |
| 25 Sep | 17:00 | Cameroon | 0–3 | Serbia | 17–25 | 13–25 | 24–26 | | | 54–76 | P2 P3 |
| 25 Sep | 20:00 | Turkey | 2–3 | Bulgaria | 25–20 | 23–25 | 18–25 | 27–25 | 12–15 | 105–110 | P2 P3 |
| 27 Sep | 10:30 | Bulgaria | 3–0 | Cameroon | 25–16 | 25–20 | 25–23 | | | 75–59 | P2 P3 |
| 27 Sep | 17:00 | Serbia | 3–1 | Canada | 25–7 | 26–28 | 25–21 | 25–15 | | 101–71 | P2 P3 |
| 27 Sep | 20:00 | Brazil | 3–2 | Turkey | 17–25 | 22–25 | 25–19 | 25–21 | 15–10 | 104–100 | P2 P3 |
| 28 Sep | 10:30 | Cameroon | 0–3 | Turkey | 18–25 | 18–25 | 12–25 | | | 48–75 | P2 P3 |
| 28 Sep | 17:00 | Bulgaria | 3–0 | Canada | 25–17 | 25–16 | 25–18 | | | 75–51 | P2 P3 |
| 28 Sep | 20:00 | Brazil | 3–1 | Serbia | 24–26 | 25–21 | 25–19 | 25–23 | | 99–89 | P2 P3 |

==== Pool C ====
Venue: PalaOlimpia, Verona

| Pos | Team | Pld | W | L | Pts | SW | SL | SR | SPW | SPL | SPR | Qualification |
|---|---|---|---|---|---|---|---|---|---|---|---|---|
| 1 | United States | 5 | 5 | 0 | 15 | 15 | 2 | 7.500 | 437 | 357 | 1.224 | Second round |
| 2 | Russia | 5 | 4 | 1 | 12 | 13 | 4 | 3.250 | 427 | 354 | 1.206 | Second round |
| 3 | Netherlands | 5 | 3 | 2 | 9 | 10 | 6 | 1.667 | 377 | 358 | 1.053 | Second round |
| 4 | Kazakhstan | 5 | 2 | 3 | 6 | 6 | 9 | 0.667 | 316 | 331 | 0.955 | Second round |
| 5 | Thailand | 5 | 1 | 4 | 3 | 3 | 12 | 0.250 | 323 | 383 | 0.843 | |
| 6 | Mexico | 5 | 0 | 5 | 0 | 1 | 15 | 0.067 | 318 | 415 | 0.766 | |

| Date | Time | | Score | | Set 1 | Set 2 | Set 3 | Set 4 | Set 5 | Total | Report |
|---|---|---|---|---|---|---|---|---|---|---|---|
| 23 Sep | 10:30 | Netherlands | 3–0 | Kazakhstan | 25–21 | 25–17 | 25–21 | | | 75–59 | P2 P3 |
| 23 Sep | 17:00 | Russia | 3–0 | Thailand | 25–18 | 25–19 | 25–22 | | | 75–59 | P2 P3 |
| 23 Sep | 20:00 | United States | 3–1 | Mexico | 19–25 | 25–11 | 25–20 | 25–14 | | 94–70 | P2 P3 |
| 24 Sep | 10:30 | Kazakhstan | 0–3 | United States | 20–25 | 15–25 | 22–25 | | | 57–75 | P2 P3 |
| 24 Sep | 17:00 | Russia | 3–0 | Mexico | 25–17 | 25–22 | 25–13 | | | 75–52 | P2 P3 |
| 24 Sep | 20:00 | Thailand | 0–3 | Netherlands | 20–25 | 22–25 | 18–25 | | | 60–75 | P2 P3 |
| 25 Sep | 10:30 | Thailand | 3–0 | Mexico | 27–25 | 36–34 | 26–24 | | | 89–83 | P2 P3 |
| 25 Sep | 17:00 | Kazakhstan | 0–3 | Russia | 13–25 | 21–25 | 16–25 | | | 50–75 | P2 P3 |
| 25 Sep | 20:00 | Netherlands | 0–3 | United States | 27–29 | 21–25 | 18–25 | | | 66–79 | P2 P3 |
| 27 Sep | 10:30 | Mexico | 0–3 | Kazakhstan | 12–25 | 16–25 | 21–25 | | | 49–75 | P2 P3 |
| 27 Sep | 17:00 | Russia | 3–1 | Netherlands | 19–25 | 25–13 | 27–25 | 25–16 | | 96–79 | P2 P3 |
| 27 Sep | 20:00 | United States | 3–0 | Thailand | 25–15 | 25–23 | 25–20 | | | 75–58 | P2 P3 |
| 28 Sep | 10:30 | Mexico | 0–3 | Netherlands | 30–32 | 17–25 | 17–25 | | | 64–82 | P2 P3 |
| 28 Sep | 17:00 | Kazakhstan | 3–0 | Thailand | 25–15 | 25–22 | 25–20 | | | 75–57 | P2 P3 |
| 28 Sep | 20:00 | United States | 3–1 | Russia | 34–32 | 25–19 | 29–31 | 26–24 | | 114–106 | P2 P3 |

==== Pool D ====
Venue: PalaFlorio, Bari

| Pos | Team | Pld | W | L | Pts | SW | SL | SR | SPW | SPL | SPR | Qualification |
|---|---|---|---|---|---|---|---|---|---|---|---|---|
| 1 | China | 5 | 5 | 0 | 14 | 15 | 2 | 7.500 | 408 | 309 | 1.320 | Second round |
| 2 | Japan | 5 | 3 | 2 | 11 | 13 | 7 | 1.857 | 444 | 426 | 1.042 | Second round |
| 3 | Belgium | 5 | 3 | 2 | 9 | 10 | 6 | 1.667 | 377 | 325 | 1.160 | Second round |
| 4 | Azerbaijan | 5 | 3 | 2 | 7 | 9 | 11 | 0.818 | 410 | 449 | 0.913 | Second round |
| 5 | Puerto Rico | 5 | 1 | 4 | 4 | 5 | 12 | 0.417 | 364 | 399 | 0.912 | |
| 6 | Cuba | 5 | 0 | 5 | 0 | 1 | 15 | 0.067 | 308 | 403 | 0.764 | |

| Date | Time | | Score | | Set 1 | Set 2 | Set 3 | Set 4 | Set 5 | Total | Report |
|---|---|---|---|---|---|---|---|---|---|---|---|
| 23 Sep | 10:30 | China | 3–0 | Puerto Rico | 25–23 | 25–18 | 25–20 | | | 75–61 | P2 P3 |
| 23 Sep | 17:00 | Japan | 2–3 | Azerbaijan | 25–17 | 20–25 | 25–20 | 21–25 | 9–15 | 100–102 | P2 P3 |
| 23 Sep | 20:00 | Cuba | 0–3 | Belgium | 15–25 | 12–25 | 16–25 | | | 43–75 | P2 P3 |
| 24 Sep | 10:30 | China | 3–0 | Azerbaijan | 25–13 | 25–16 | 25–17 | | | 75–46 | P2 P3 |
| 24 Sep | 17:00 | Belgium | 1–3 | Japan | 22–25 | 25–22 | 20–25 | 23–25 | | 90–97 | P2 P3 |
| 24 Sep | 20:00 | Puerto Rico | 3–0 | Cuba | 25–22 | 27–25 | 25–19 | | | 77–66 | P2 P3 |
| 25 Sep | 10:30 | Puerto Rico | 2–3 | Azerbaijan | 20–25 | 26–24 | 24–26 | 25–16 | 15–17 | 110–108 | P2 P3 |
| 25 Sep | 17:00 | Cuba | 0–3 | Japan | 19–25 | 24–26 | 23–25 | | | 66–76 | P2 P3 |
| 25 Sep | 20:00 | Belgium | 0–3 | China | 21–25 | 22–25 | 19–25 | | | 62–75 | P2 P3 |
| 27 Sep | 10:30 | Azerbaijan | 0–3 | Belgium | 21–25 | 12–25 | 21–25 | | | 54–75 | P2 P3 |
| 27 Sep | 17:00 | Japan | 3–0 | Puerto Rico | 25–21 | 25–20 | 25–19 | | | 75–60 | P2 P3 |
| 27 Sep | 20:00 | China | 3–0 | Cuba | 25–15 | 25–11 | 25–18 | | | 75–44 | P2 P3 |
| 28 Sep | 10:30 | Azerbaijan | 3–1 | Cuba | 25–20 | 25–27 | 25–20 | 25–22 | | 100–89 | P2 P3 |
| 28 Sep | 17:00 | Japan | 2–3 | China | 16–25 | 25–18 | 27–25 | 17–25 | 11–15 | 96–108 | P2 P3 |
| 28 Sep | 20:00 | Belgium | 3–0 | Puerto Rico | 25–20 | 25–17 | 25–19 | | | 75–56 | P2 P3 |

=== Second round ===
The results and points of the matches between the same teams that were already played during the first round were taken into account for the second round.

==== Pool E ====
Venues: PalaFlorio, Bari and PalaTrieste, Trieste

| Pos | Team | Pld | W | L | Pts | SW | SL | SR | SPW | SPL | SPR | Qualification |
|---|---|---|---|---|---|---|---|---|---|---|---|---|
| 1 | Italy | 7 | 6 | 1 | 19 | 20 | 6 | 3.333 | 610 | 509 | 1.198 | Third round |
| 2 | China | 7 | 6 | 1 | 16 | 19 | 7 | 2.714 | 599 | 504 | 1.188 | Third round |
| 3 | Dominican Republic | 7 | 5 | 2 | 13 | 19 | 15 | 1.267 | 734 | 686 | 1.070 | Third round |
| 4 | Japan | 7 | 3 | 4 | 10 | 15 | 17 | 0.882 | 670 | 693 | 0.967 | |
| 5 | Germany | 7 | 2 | 5 | 9 | 13 | 15 | 0.867 | 597 | 591 | 1.010 | |
| 6 | Belgium | 7 | 2 | 5 | 7 | 9 | 16 | 0.563 | 534 | 563 | 0.948 | |
| 7 | Croatia | 7 | 2 | 5 | 5 | 10 | 19 | 0.526 | 556 | 670 | 0.830 | |
| 8 | Azerbaijan | 7 | 2 | 5 | 5 | 8 | 18 | 0.444 | 519 | 603 | 0.861 | |

| Date | Time | Venue | | Score | | Set 1 | Set 2 | Set 3 | Set 4 | Set 5 | Total | Report |
|---|---|---|---|---|---|---|---|---|---|---|---|---|
| 1 Oct | 17:00 | Bari | Dominican Republic | 3–2 | Belgium | 25–17 | 25–22 | 22–25 | 22–25 | 15–6 | 109–95 | P2 P3 |
| 1 Oct | 18:10 | Trieste | Croatia | 3–2 | Japan | 18–25 | 25–23 | 25–27 | 25–20 | 15–8 | 108–103 | P2 P3 |
| 1 Oct | 20:00 | Bari | Italy | 3–1 | Azerbaijan | 25–19 | 25–21 | 21–25 | 25–23 | | 96–88 | P2 P3 |
| 1 Oct | 20:00 | Trieste | Germany | 0–3 | China | 16–25 | 23–25 | 23–25 | | | 62–75 | P2 P3 |
| 2 Oct | 17:00 | Bari | Dominican Republic | 3–1 | Azerbaijan | 23–25 | 25–11 | 25–21 | 25–17 | | 98–74 | P2 P3 |
| 2 Oct | 22:10 | Trieste | Germany | 2–3 | Japan | 25–23 | 24–26 | 19–25 | 25–16 | 11–15 | 104–105 | P2 P3 |
| 2 Oct | 20:00 | Bari | Italy | 3–0 | Belgium | 25–18 | 25–22 | 25–18 | | | 75–58 | P2 P3 |
| 2 Oct | 20:00 | Trieste | Croatia | 0–3 | China | 12–25 | 15–25 | 15–25 | | | 42–75 | P2 P3 |
| 4 Oct | 17:00 | Bari | Dominican Republic | 2–3 | China | 19–25 | 19–25 | 25–22 | 25–20 | 10–15 | 98–107 | P2 P3 |
| 4 Oct | 17:00 | Trieste | Germany | 3–0 | Belgium | 25–20 | 25–15 | 25–21 | | | 75–56 | P2 P3 |
| 4 Oct | 20:00 | Bari | Italy | 3–0 | Japan | 25–23 | 25–20 | 25–19 | | | 75–62 | P2 P3 |
| 4 Oct | 20:00 | Trieste | Croatia | 1–3 | Azerbaijan | 25–23 | 23–25 | 13–25 | 23–25 | | 84–98 | P2 P3 |
| 5 Oct | 17:00 | Trieste | Germany | 3–0 | Azerbaijan | 25–15 | 25–23 | 25–19 | | | 75–57 | P2 P3 |
| 5 Oct | 19:10 | Bari | Dominican Republic | 2–3 | Japan | 21–25 | 23–25 | 25–19 | 25–23 | 12–15 | 106–107 | P2 P3 |
| 5 Oct | 20:00 | Bari | Italy | 3–1 | China | 22–25 | 25–18 | 26–24 | 25–17 | | 98–84 | P2 P3 |
| 5 Oct | 20:00 | Trieste | Croatia | 1–3 | Belgium | 12–25 | 23–25 | 25–23 | 18–25 | | 78–98 | P2 P3 |

==== Pool F ====
Venues: PalaOlimpia, Verona and PalaPanini, Modena

| Pos | Team | Pld | W | L | Pts | SW | SL | SR | SPW | SPL | SPR | Qualification |
|---|---|---|---|---|---|---|---|---|---|---|---|---|
| 1 | Brazil | 7 | 7 | 0 | 20 | 21 | 5 | 4.200 | 628 | 539 | 1.165 | Third round |
| 2 | United States | 7 | 6 | 1 | 18 | 18 | 5 | 3.600 | 586 | 506 | 1.158 | Third round |
| 3 | Russia | 7 | 4 | 3 | 13 | 16 | 11 | 1.455 | 653 | 600 | 1.088 | Third round |
| 4 | Serbia | 7 | 4 | 3 | 11 | 13 | 12 | 1.083 | 565 | 549 | 1.029 | |
| 5 | Turkey | 7 | 3 | 4 | 10 | 15 | 15 | 1.000 | 654 | 640 | 1.022 | |
| 6 | Bulgaria | 7 | 2 | 5 | 6 | 10 | 17 | 0.588 | 565 | 611 | 0.925 | |
| 7 | Netherlands | 7 | 2 | 5 | 6 | 9 | 16 | 0.563 | 542 | 591 | 0.917 | |
| 8 | Kazakhstan | 7 | 0 | 7 | 0 | 0 | 21 | 0.000 | 368 | 525 | 0.701 | |

| Date | Time | Venue | | Score | | Set 1 | Set 2 | Set 3 | Set 4 | Set 5 | Total | Report |
|---|---|---|---|---|---|---|---|---|---|---|---|---|
| 1 Oct | 17:00 | Verona | Serbia | 3–0 | Netherlands | 25–22 | 25–23 | 25–23 | | | 75–68 | P2 P3 |
| 1 Oct | 17:00 | Modena | Turkey | 1–3 | United States | 29–27 | 19–25 | 23–25 | 15–25 | | 86–102 | P2 P3 |
| 1 Oct | 20:00 | Verona | Brazil | 3–0 | Kazakhstan | 25–22 | 25–22 | 25–18 | | | 75–62 | P2 P3 |
| 1 Oct | 20:00 | Modena | Bulgaria | 1–3 | Russia | 23–25 | 15–25 | 28–26 | 19–25 | | 85–101 | P2 P3 |
| 2 Oct | 17:00 | Verona | Serbia | 3–0 | Kazakhstan | 25–13 | 25–15 | 25–20 | | | 75–48 | P2 P3 |
| 2 Oct | 17:00 | Modena | Turkey | 3–2 | Russia | 19–25 | 25–27 | 25–22 | 25–22 | 15–13 | 109–109 | P2 P3 |
| 2 Oct | 20:00 | Verona | Brazil | 3–1 | Netherlands | 23–25 | 25–20 | 25–16 | 25–16 | | 98–77 | P2 P3 |
| 2 Oct | 20:00 | Modena | Bulgaria | 0–3 | United States | 17–25 | 19–25 | 16–25 | | | 52–75 | P2 P3 |
| 4 Oct | 17:00 | Verona | Serbia | 0–3 | United States | 22–25 | 20–25 | 22–25 | | | 64–75 | P2 P3 |
| 4 Oct | 17:00 | Modena | Turkey | 3–1 | Netherlands | 23–25 | 25–17 | 25–16 | 25–20 | | 98–78 | P2 P3 |
| 4 Oct | 20:00 | Verona | Brazil | 3–1 | Russia | 25–17 | 25–27 | 25–19 | 27–25 | | 102–88 | P2 P3 |
| 4 Oct | 20:00 | Modena | Bulgaria | 3–0 | Kazakhstan | 25–22 | 25–15 | 25–13 | | | 75–50 | P2 P3 |
| 5 Oct | 17:00 | Verona | Serbia | 0–3 | Russia | 26–28 | 18–25 | 17–25 | | | 61–78 | P2 P3 |
| 5 Oct | 17:00 | Modena | Turkey | 3–0 | Kazakhstan | 25–15 | 25–13 | 25–14 | | | 75–42 | P2 P3 |
| 5 Oct | 20:00 | Verona | Brazil | 3–0 | United States | 25–23 | 25–22 | 25–21 | | | 75–66 | P2 P3 |
| 5 Oct | 20:00 | Modena | Bulgaria | 1–3 | Netherlands | 26–24 | 21–25 | 23–25 | 16–25 | | 86–99 | P2 P3 |

=== Third round ===
Second round pool winners were placed in each third round pool, while the second and third placed teams were drawn.

Venue: Mediolanum Forum, Milan

==== Pool G ====
| Pos | Team | Pld | W | L | Pts | SW | SL | SR | SPW | SPL | SPR | Qualification |
|---|---|---|---|---|---|---|---|---|---|---|---|---|
| 1 | Italy | 2 | 2 | 0 | 6 | 6 | 1 | 6.000 | 162 | 142 | 1.141 | Final round |
| 2 | United States | 2 | 1 | 1 | 3 | 3 | 4 | 0.750 | 155 | 165 | 0.939 | Final round |
| 3 | Russia | 2 | 0 | 2 | 0 | 2 | 6 | 0.333 | 167 | 177 | 0.944 | |

| Date | Time | | Score | | Set 1 | Set 2 | Set 3 | Set 4 | Set 5 | Total | Report |
|---|---|---|---|---|---|---|---|---|---|---|---|
| 8 Oct | 20:00 | Italy | 3–0 | United States | 25–23 | 25–22 | 25–20 | | | 75–65 | P2 P3 |
| 9 Oct | 20:00 | United States | 3–1 | Russia | 25–19 | 25–23 | 15–25 | 25–23 | | 90–90 | P2 P3 |
| 10 Oct | 20:00 | Italy | 3–1 | Russia | 25–12 | 25–17 | 12–25 | 25–23 | | 87–77 | P2 P3 |

==== Pool H ====
| Pos | Team | Pld | W | L | Pts | SW | SL | SR | SPW | SPL | SPR | Qualification |
|---|---|---|---|---|---|---|---|---|---|---|---|---|
| 1 | Brazil | 2 | 2 | 0 | 6 | 6 | 0 | MAX | 150 | 107 | 1.402 | Final round |
| 2 | China | 2 | 1 | 1 | 2 | 3 | 5 | 0.600 | 160 | 183 | 0.874 | Final round |
| 3 | Dominican Republic | 2 | 0 | 2 | 1 | 2 | 6 | 0.333 | 165 | 185 | 0.892 | |

| Date | Time | | Score | | Set 1 | Set 2 | Set 3 | Set 4 | Set 5 | Total | Report |
|---|---|---|---|---|---|---|---|---|---|---|---|
| 8 Oct | 17:30 | Brazil | 3–0 | China | 25–19 | 25–16 | 25–15 | | | 75–50 | P2 P3 |
| 9 Oct | 17:30 | China | 3–2 | Dominican Republic | 22–25 | 23–25 | 25–23 | 25–23 | 15–12 | 110–108 | P2 P3 |
| 10 Oct | 17:30 | Brazil | 3–0 | Dominican Republic | 25–19 | 25–21 | 25–17 | | | 75–57 | P2 P3 |

=== Final round ===
Venue: Mediolanum Forum, Milan

Semifinals
11 October
Italy | 1
China | 3
11 October
United States | 3
Brazil | 0

Final
12 October
China | 1
United States | 3
3rd place
12 October
Italy | 2
Brazil | 3

==== Semifinals ====
| Date | Time | | Score | | Set 1 | Set 2 | Set 3 | Set 4 | Set 5 | Total | Report |
|---|---|---|---|---|---|---|---|---|---|---|---|
| 11 Oct | 17:30 | United States | 3–0 | Brazil | 25–18 | 29–27 | 25–20 | | | 79–65 | P2 P3 |
| 11 Oct | 20:45 | Italy | 1–3 | China | 21–25 | 20–25 | 25–20 | 28–30 | | 94–100 | P2 P3 |

==== 3rd place match ====
| Date | Time | | Score | | Set 1 | Set 2 | Set 3 | Set 4 | Set 5 | Total | Report |
|---|---|---|---|---|---|---|---|---|---|---|---|
| 12 Oct | 17:30 | Italy | 2–3 | Brazil | 15–25 | 13–25 | 25–22 | 25–22 | 7–15 | 85–109 | P2 P3 |

==== Final ====
| Date | Time | | Score | | Set 1 | Set 2 | Set 3 | Set 4 | Set 5 | Total | Report |
|---|---|---|---|---|---|---|---|---|---|---|---|
| 12 Oct | 20:00 | China | 1–3 | United States | 25–27 | 20–25 | 25–16 | 24–26 | | 94–94 | P2 P3 |

== Final standing ==
| Rank | Team |
|---|---|
| 1st place, gold medalist(s) | United States |
| 2nd place, silver medalist(s) | China |
| 3rd place, bronze medalist(s) | Brazil |
| 4 | Italy |
| 5 | Dominican Republic |
| 6 | Russia |
| 7 | Japan |
| 7 | Serbia |
| 9 | Germany |
| 9 | Turkey |
| 11 | Belgium |
| 11 | Bulgaria |
| 13 | Croatia |
| 13 | Netherlands |
| 15 | Azerbaijan |
| 15 | Kazakhstan |
| 17 | Argentina |
| 17 | Canada |
| 17 | Puerto Rico |
| 17 | Thailand |
| 21 | Cameroon |
| 21 | Cuba |
| 21 | Mexico |
| 21 | Tunisia |

| Qualified for the 2015 World Cup |

2014 Women's World champions

United States
1st title

Team roster
Alisha Glass, Kayla Banwarth, Courtney Thompson, Nicole Davis, Kristin Hildebrand, Jordan Larson, Kelly Murphy, Christa Harmotto (c), Nicole Fawcett, Kimberly Hill, Foluke Akinradewo, Kelsey Robinson, TeTori Dixon, Rachael Adams
Head coach
Karch Kiraly

== Awards ==
- Most valuable player
  (United States) Kimberly Hill
- Best setter
  (United States) Alisha Glass
- Best outside spikers
  (China) Zhu Ting
  (United States) Kimberly Hill
- Fair Play
  (Brazil) José Roberto Guimarães
- Best middle blockers
  (Brazil) Thaísa Menezes
  (China) Yang Junjing
- Best opposite spiker
  (Brazil) Sheilla Castro
- Best libero
  (Italy) Monica De Gennaro

== See also ==
- 2014 FIVB Volleyball Men's World Championship
