= 2013 Women's South American Volleyball Championship =

Tournament details
- Host country: Peru
- Dates: September 18–22
- Teams: 6
- Venue: 1 (in Ica host cities)

Final positions
- Champions: Brazil (18th title)

Tournament awards
- MVP: Madelaynne Montaño (COL)

The 2013 Women's South American Volleyball Championship was the 30th edition of the Women's South American Volleyball Championship, organised by South America's governing volleyball body, the Confederación Sudamericana de Voleibol (CSV). The tournament was played in Ica, Peru from September 18 to 22, 2013.

Brazil won the Continental Championship and qualified to the 2013 World Grand Champions Cup and the 2014 World Championship. Argentina, Peru and Colombia qualified to the 2014 South American World Championship Qualification Tournament in San Juan, Argentina.

== Competing nations ==
The following national teams have confirmed participation:

- Argentina
- Brazil
- Chile
- Colombia
- Peru
- Venezuela

The following national teams were invited but declined participation:

- Bolivia
- Ecuador
- Paraguay
- Uruguay

== Round-Robin ==
Pos	Team	Pld	W	L	Pts	SW	SL	SR	SPW	SPL	SPR
1	Brazil	5	5	0	15	15	0	MAX	375	190	1.974
2	Argentina	5	4	1	11	12	7	1.714	397	405	0.980
3	Peru	5	3	2	8	10	9	1.111	402	402	1.000
4	Colombia	5	2	3	8	10	10	1.000	426	429	0.993
5	Venezuela	5	1	4	3	6	12	0.500	367	415	0.884
6	Chile	5	0	5	0	0	15	0.000	249	375	0.664

All times are local, UTC−5:00

Date	Time		Score		Set 1	Set 2	Set 3	Set 4	Set 5	Total
18 Sep	15:00	Brazil	3–0	Chile	25–10	25–5	25–4			75–19
18 Sep	17:00	Argentina	3–2	Colombia	19–25	31–29	11–25	25–12	15–11	101–102
18 Sep	19:00	Peru	3–1	Venezuela	22–25	25–19	25–15	25–16		97–75
19 Sep	15:00	Argentina	3–1	Venezuela	18–25	25–14	25–18	25–16		93–73
19 Sep	17:00	Brazil	3–0	Colombia	25–13	25–14	25–18			75–45
19 Sep	19:00	Peru	3–0	Chile	25–14	25–20	25–19			75–53
20 Sep	15:00	Venezuela	3–0	Chile	25–11	25–20	25–22			75–53
20 Sep	17:00	Brazil	3–0	Argentina	25–16	25–13	25–7			75–36
20 Sep	19:00	Peru	3–2	Colombia	16–25	25–27	25–20	25–22	15–13	106–107
21 Sep	14:00	Chile	0–3	Colombia	18–25	23–25	19–25			60–75
21 Sep	16:00	Brazil	3–0	Venezuela	25–20	25–20	25–17			75–57
21 Sep	18:00	Peru	1–3	Argentina	23–25	25–17	20–25	23–25		91–92
22 Sep	13:00	Chile	0–3	Argentina	19–25	23–25	22–25			64–75
22 Sep	15:00	Colombia	3–1	Venezuela	22–25	25–19	25–21	25–22		97–87
22 Sep	17:00	Peru	0–3	Brazil	8–25	17–25	8–25			33–75

== Final standing ==
Rank	Team
1st place, gold medalist(s)	Brazil
2nd place, silver medalist(s)	Argentina
3rd place, bronze medalist(s)	Peru
4	Colombia
5	Venezuela
6	Chile

Qualified for the 2014 World Championship and the 2013 World Grand Champions Cup
Qualified for the 2014 World Championship Qualifier

2013 Women's South American Volleyball Championship

Brazil
18th title

12–woman Roster
Fabiana Claudino (c), Juciely Barreto, Danielle Lins, Adenízia da Silva, Michelle Pavão, Gabriela Guimarães, Natália Pereira, Sheilla Castro, Fabiana de Oliveira, Monique Pavão, Fernanda Rodrigues, Camila Brait
Head coach
José Roberto Guimarães

== Awards ==
- Most valuable player
  - Madelaynne Montaño (COL)
- Best setter
  - Ahizar Zuniaga (VEN)
- Best Outside Hitters
  - Karla Ortiz (PER)
  - Fernanda Garay (BRA)
- Best Middle Blockers
  - Fabiana Claudino (BRA)
  - Mirtha Uribe (PER)
- Best Opposite
  - Sheilla Castro (BRA)
- Best libero
  - Fabiana de Oliveira (BRA)
