= 2014 FIVB Women's Volleyball World Championship qualification (CSV) =

The CSV qualification for the 2014 FIVB Women's Volleyball World Championship saw member nations compete for two places at the finals in Italy. The champion team at the 2013 Women's South American Volleyball Championship, plus the best team from the qualification tournament qualified for the World Championship.

== Participating nations ==
7 CSV national teams entered CSV championship as qualification tournament. Uruguay later withdrew.

- Argentina
- Brazil
- Chile
- Colombia
- Peru
- ~~Uruguay~~
- Venezuela

== South American Championship ==
| Rank | Team |
|---|---|
| 1st place, gold medalist(s) | Brazil |
| 2nd place, silver medalist(s) | Argentina |
| 3rd place, bronze medalist(s) | Peru |
| 4 | Colombia |
| 5 | Venezuela |
| 6 | Chile |

- The next four teams advanced to the final qualification tournament but Venezuela withdrew.

== Qualification tournament ==
- Venue: Polideportivo Aldo Cantoni, San Juan, Argentina
- Dates: October 18–20, 2013
- All times are Argentina Time (UTC−03:00)

| Pos | Team | Pld | W | L | Pts | SW | SL | SR | SPW | SPL | SPR |
|---|---|---|---|---|---|---|---|---|---|---|---|
| 1 | Argentina | 2 | 2 | 0 | 6 | 6 | 0 | MAX | 150 | 45 | 3.333 |
| 2 | Colombia | 2 | 1 | 1 | 2 | 3 | 5 | 0.600 | 144 | 175 | 0.823 |
| 3 | Peru | 2 | 0 | 2 | 1 | 2 | 6 | 0.333 | 100 | 174 | 0.575 |

| Date | Time | | Score | | Set 1 | Set 2 | Set 3 | Set 4 | Set 5 | Total | Report |
|---|---|---|---|---|---|---|---|---|---|---|---|
| 18 Oct | 20:00 | Peru | 2–3 | Colombia | 25–19 | 17–25 | 25–15 | 20–25 | 13–15 | 100–99 | Report |
| 19 Oct | 18:00 | Colombia | 0–3 | Argentina | 21–25 | 18–25 | 6–25 | | | 45–75 | Report |
| 20 Oct | 21:00 | Argentina | 3–0 | Peru | 25–0 | 25–0 | 25–0 | | | 75–0 | Report |

- Argentina won the first two set (25–20, 25–19) but Peru withdrew in the middle of the third set (13–9) and officially lost by triple 0–25.
