= Sudan women's national volleyball team =

National sports team

Sudan
- Association: Sudan Volleyball Federation
- Confederation: CAVB
- FIVB ranking: – (as of 8 January 2025)

Uniforms
Home

The Sudan women's national volleyball team represents Sudan in international women's volleyball competitions and friendly matches.

They appeared at the 1976 African Women's Volleyball Championship in Egypt.
