= Togo women's national volleyball team =

National sports team

Togo
- Association: Togo Volleyball Federation
- Confederation: CAVB
- FIVB ranking: NR (2 October 2026)

Uniforms
Home

The Togo women's national volleyball team represents Togo in international women's volleyball competitions and friendly matches.

It took part in the 2014 FIVB Volleyball Women's World Championship qualification.
