= Tahani Toson =

Egyptian volleyball player (born 1971)

Personal information
- Nationality: Egyptian
- Born: 22 September 1971 (age 55)
- Height: 177 cm (5 ft 10 in)
- Weight: 77 kg (170 lb)
- Spike: 305 cm (120 in)
- Block: 295 cm (116 in)

Volleyball information
- Position: wing spiker
- Number: 11 (national team)

National team
2002	Egypt

Tahani Toson (born 22 September 1971) is a retired Egyptian female volleyball player, who played as a wing spiker.

She was part of the Egypt women's national volleyball team at the 2002 FIVB Volleyball Women's World Championship in Germany, and the 2003 FIVB Volleyball Women's World Cup. On club level she played with Al Ahly.

== Clubs ==
- Al Ahly (2002)
