= Republic of the Congo women's national volleyball team =

National sports team

Republic of the Congo
- Association: Republic of the Congo Volleyball Association
- Confederation: CAVB
- FIVB ranking: NR (2 October 2026)

Uniforms
Home

The Republic of the Congo women's national volleyball team represents the Republic of the Congo in international women's volleyball competitions and friendly matches.

It qualified for the Volleyball at the 2015 African Games – Women's tournament.
