= Seychelles women's national volleyball team =

National sports team

Seychelles
- Confederation: CAVB
- FIVB ranking: NR (2 October 2026)

Uniforms
Home

Seychelles women's national volleyball team
Medal record

African Championship
Gold medal – first place	2001 Port Harcourt	Team

The Seychelles women's national volleyball team represents Seychelles in international competitions in women's volleyball. The squad's biggest win was the gold medal at the 2001 edition of the African Championship.

== Results ==
=== African Championship ===
- 1976-1999 — did not participate
- 2001 — Gold Medal
- 2003 — 6th place
- 2005-2011 — did not participate
- 2013 — 7th place

=== All-Africa Games ===
- 2015 - 4th place
