= Ivory Coast women's national volleyball team =

National sports team

Ivory Coast
- Association: Ivory Coast Volleyball Federation
- Confederation: CAVB
- FIVB ranking: ? (as of 8 January 2025)

Uniforms
Home

The Ivory Coast women's national volleyball team represents the Ivory Coast in international women's volleyball competitions and friendly matches.

The team qualified for the 2005 Women's African Volleyball Championship and placed 7th.
