= Gambia women's national volleyball team =

National sports team

Gambia
- Association: Gambia Volleyball Federation
- Confederation: CAVB
- FIVB ranking: NR (29 June 2025)

Uniforms
Home

The Gambia women's national volleyball team represents The Gambia in international women's volleyball competitions and friendly matches.

In 2014 the team went to Cape Verde to compete in regional heats in preparation for the World Championships.

== Beach volleyball ==
The women's beach volleyball team won Gold in the Olympics Sub-Zonal qualifiers in Dakar and another gold in the second round of the qualifiers in Abidjan giving them the qualification to the Continental Cup finals in Abuja where they finished 8th in a 12 nations finals.

In June 2021, the team aimed to book their tickets to the Tokyo Olympic Games. Through several regional victories, they proceeded to the final tournament, the Beach Volleyball Continental Cup Olympics qualifiers in Agadir, Morocco.

The head coach through the latter undertaking was Pa Baboucarr Barrow.
