= Botswana women's national volleyball team =

National sports team

Botswana
- Confederation: CAVB
- FIVB ranking: NR (29 June 2025)

Uniforms
Home	Away

Botswana women's national volleyball team
Medal record

The Botswana women's national volleyball team represents Botswana in international competitions in women's volleyball.

== History ==
Botswana made its continental debut in the mid-2000s. At the 2007 Women's African Volleyball Championship in Nairobi, the team finished seventh.

In 2009, during the Africa Cup in Algeria, Botswana defeated Gabon but ended in fifth place out of six teams after losses to Algeria, Cameroon, and Egypt.

The team returned to Nairobi in 2011, recording a pool victory against Rwanda before falling to Algeria and Tunisia, which sent them into the 5th place playoff.

In 2014, Botswana placed fourth at the African final round of World Championship qualifiers in Algiers, defeating Nigeria and DR Congo but missing out on qualification.

Botswana participated in the 2016 African Olympic Qualification Tournament in Yaoundé, where they faced Egypt, Uganda, and other continental powers.

== Recent activity ==
In 2019, Botswana competed in the All-Africa Games zonal qualifiers in Mozambique, opening with a 3–0 victory over Eswatini.

In 2025, Botswana hosted the Ditsala International Cup in Gaborone, welcoming Southern African and United States collegiate select teams. The invitational aimed to give the senior and junior national teams exposure to higher-level play.

== Results ==
=== African Championship ===
- 2003 – did not participate
- 2005 – 7th place
- 2007 – 7th place
- 2009 – 5th place
- 2011 – 7th place
- 2013 – did not participate
- 2015 – 7th place

=== All-Africa Games ===
- 2007 – did not participate
- 2011 – 6th place
- 2015 – group stage
