= Eswatini women's national volleyball team =

National sports team

Eswatini
- Association: Eswatini National Volleyball Association (ENVA)
- Confederation: CAVB
- FIVB ranking: NR (29 June 2025)

Uniforms
Home

The Eswatini women's national volleyball team represents Eswatini in international women's volleyball competitions and friendly matches.

Their head coach is Thulani Maphosa, supported by Wandile Sithole and Mbuso Vilakati.
