= Ghana women's national volleyball team =

Ghana
- Association: Ghana Volleyball Federation
- Confederation: CAVB
- FIVB ranking: NR (24 May 2026)

Uniforms
Home

The Ghana women's national volleyball team represents Ghana in international women's volleyball competitions and friendly matches.

Its best result was 4th place at the 1991 Women's African Volleyball Championship.

== Results ==
=== African Championship ===
- (Cameroon) 2023 – did not qualify
- (Kenya) 2026 – 7th place
