= Cape Verde women's national volleyball team =

National sports team

Cape Verde
- Association: Cape Verde Volleyball Association
- Confederation: CAVB
- FIVB ranking: NR (29 June 2025)

Uniforms
Home	Away

The Cape Verde women's national volleyball team represents Cape Verde in international women's volleyball competitions and friendly matches.
