= Anne Buijs =

Dutch volleyball player (born 1991)

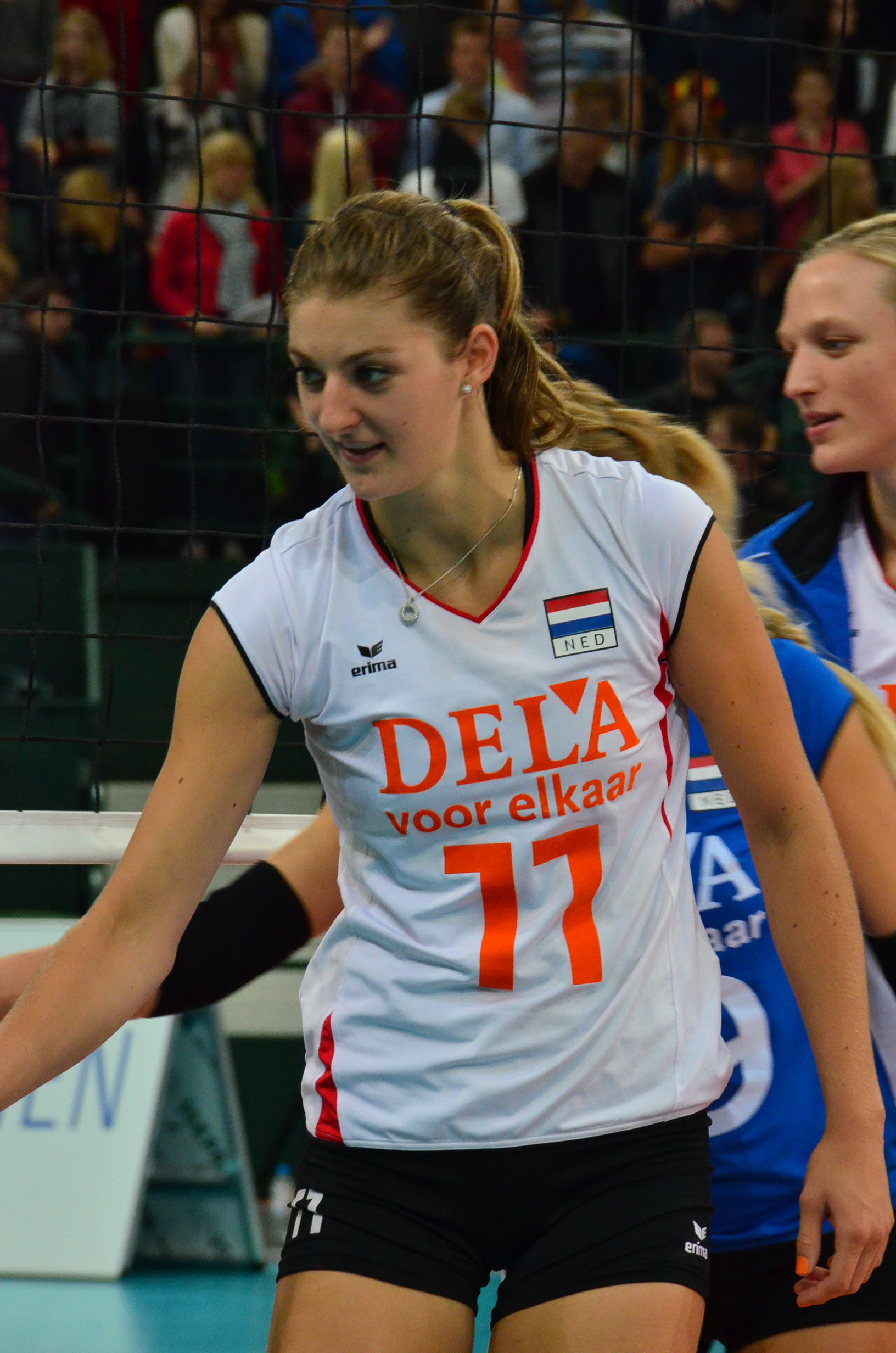

Personal information
- Nationality: Dutch
- Born: 2 December 1991 (age 34); Oostzaan, Netherlands
- Height: 1.91 m (6 ft 3 in)
- Weight: 75 kg (165 lb)
- Spike: 317 cm (125 in)
- Block: 299 cm (118 in)

Volleyball information
- Position: Wing Spiker / Opposite spiker
- Current club: (United States) LOVB Nebraska
- Number: 11

Career
Years	Teams
2006–2007; 2007–2010; 2010–2011; 2011–2013; 2013–2014; 2014–2015; 2015–2016; 2016–2017; 2017–2018; 2018–2019; 2019–2020; 2020–2023; 2023-2024; 2024-2025; 2025-2026	(Netherlands) VV Zaanstad (Netherlands) TVC Amstelveen (Belgium) Asterix Kieldrecht (Germany) Schweriner SC (Italy) Busto Arsizio (Azerbaijan) Lokomotiv Baku (Turkey) VakifBank Istanbul (Brazil) Rexona Rio de Janeiro (Turkey) Nilüfer Belediyespor (Italy) Saugella Team Monza (Turkey) Türk Hava Yolları (Brazil) Dentil Praia Clube (Italy) Novara (Italy) Chieri '76 Volleyball (United States) LOVB Nebraska

National team
2008-2024	Netherlands
Honours
Women's volleyball
Representing the Netherlands
Bronze medal – third place	Boris Yeltsin Volleyball Cup
Bronze medal – third place	2015 Montreux Volley Masters
World Grand Prix
Bronze medal – third place	2016 Bangkok
European Championship
Silver medal – second place	2009 Poland
Silver medal – second place	2015 Belgium / Netherlands
Silver medal – second place	2017 Azerbaijan/Georgia

Anne Elise Buijs (born 2 December 1991) is a Dutch volleyball player. She has been a member of the national team since 2008. She is the daughter of international coach and ex-volleyball player Teun Buijs, who trained her for several clubs in her career. Her mother and older brother were also volleyball players. She currently plays for the American club LOVB.

== Career ==
=== Clubs and National Team ===
Buijs has been playing volleyball since 1997, where she played at Polisport. Buijs first played professionally for the national team of the Netherlands in May 2008. Since then, she became of the most important names in her position for the team. Along with Lonneke Sloetjes, she leaded the Netherlands for a historic 4th place in the Rio 2016 Summer Olympics, her debut in the competition. They lost the semifinal to the future Olympic champions, China and the bronze medal match to the United States.

She was a leader, along with Celeste Plak, against the Serbian team in the 2014 FIVB Volleyball Women's World Championship. In 2015, her conversion at the end of the game allowed the Dutch to win against the Czech Republic in the opening match of the FIVB World Grand Prix.

With The Netherlands she won the silver medal in the 2015 the European Championship, winning "Best outside hitter" in the competition.

In the 2015 club season, she signed with Vakifbank with her teammate Robin de Kruijf and Lonneke Sloetjes, becoming champions in the 2016 Turkish League and runners-up in CEV Champions League, losing to Pomi Casalmaggiore in the gold medal match, that took place in Montichiari, Italy.

She inspired the interest of Brazilian coach and olympic champion Bernardo Rezende to join the 2016/17 season with Rexona Sesc in Rio de Janeiro. She was the most important name to replace Brazilian captain Natália Zílio, leaving to Fenerbahçe. With Rio de Janeiro, Buijs became the first Dutch player to ever win the Brazilian Superliga. She also won the 2017 Supercopa, Brazilian Cup and South American Championship. In the 2017 World Club Championship, Rexona won the silver medal against Vakifbank Istanbul.

Following the National Team for the 2017 season, she won another silver medal in the European Championship, winning that season's "Best Outside Spiker" along with Serbian player Brankica Mihajlovic. At the end of the summer, Buijs came back to Europe for the 2017/18 season, choosing Turkish team Nilüfer Belediyespor, in Bursa.

After a couple of seasons in Europe, in Turkey and Italy, Buijs came back to Brazil for the 2020/21 season. In 20 August was announced by the Brazilian team Dentil Praia Clube, in Uberlândia. She signed with the club for the next three following seasons, up until 2023. With Praia Clube, she won the 2023 Brazilian Superliga, her second title, after two silver medals. She won two gold medals and two silver medals in Mineiro Championships; was two-times champion in Brazilian Supercopa and two-times champions in South American Clubs.

In 2021, Buijs was announced captain for the Netherlands women's team, replacing teammate Maret Grothes. Her first time on court as captain took place in the Nations League 2021, in Rimini. Following the 2022 World Volleyball's Championship in Apeldoorn, Buijs took a break from the Dutch national team for the summer of 2023.

For the 2023/24 club season, she signed with the Italian team Igor Gorgonzola Novara. During the final game of the Wezva Cup, she broke the Italian club's record by scoring 42 points in a single match, winning the gold medal and the MVP title.

On 3 August 2024, during the Paris 2024 Summer Olympics, on the end of the preliminary round, announced her retirement from the Netherlands national team, where she's been a member since 2008. On 29 May 2025, she is announced, alongside Carol, in League One Volleyball (LOVB) for the 2025/26 season.

== Personal life ==
On 2 March 2023, Buijs married Ana Carolina Da Silva, her long-time partner, who plays as a middle blocker for Brazil Women's Volleyball National Team. They've been together since 2016, when they were both playing for the same club, Rexona/Sesc. The ceremony took place in Uberlândia, Brazil, when both of them were playing at Praia Clube.

== Awards ==
=== Individuals ===
- 2015 Montreux Volley Masters "Best outside spikers"
- 2015 European Championship "Best outside spiker"
- 2017 European Championship "Best outside spiker"
- 2018/19 Challenge Cup "MVP"
- 2021 South American Club Championship "Best outside spiker"
- 2022 South American Club Championship "Best outside spiker"
- 2023 Wezva Cup "MVP"

=== Clubs ===
- 2007/08 Dutch League – Champion, with VV Zaanstad
- 2008/10 Dutch League – Champion, with TVC Amstelveen
- 2010/11 Belgian League – Champion, with Asterix Kieldrecht
- 2011/13 German Bundesliga – Champion, with SC Schweriner
- 2013/14 Italian League - Runner-up, with Busto Arsizio
- 2014/15 Azerbaijani Super League – Runner-up, with Lokomotiv Baku
- 2015/2016 Turkish League - Champion, with Vakifbank
- 2016 CEV Champions League – Runner-up, with Vakifbank
- 2017 South American Club Championship – Champion, with Rexona/SESC
- 2016/17 Brazilian Superliga – Champion, with Rexona/SESC
- 2017 Club World Championship – Runner-up, with Rexona/SESC
- 2019 Challenge Cup - Champion, with Saugella Team Monza
- 2020/21 Brazilian Superliga – Runner-up, with Dentil/Praia Clube
- 2021 South American Club Championship – Champion, with Dentil/Praia Clube
- 2021/22 Brazilian Superliga – Runner-up, with Dentil/Praia Clube
- 2022 South American Club Championship – Runner-up, with Dentil/Praia Clube
- 2022/23 Brazilian Superliga – Champion, with Dentil/Praia Clube
- 2023 South American Club Championship – Champion, with Dentil/Praia Clube
- 2023 Wezva Cup Tournament - Champions, with Igor Gorgonzola Novara
- 2024 Challenge Cup - Champions, with Igor Gorgonzola Novara
- 2025 Challenge Cup - Runner-up, with Reale Mutua Chieri

=== National team ===
- European Championship: 2009, 2015, 2017,
- Grand Prix: 2016
- Montreux Volley Masters: 2015
- Yeltsin Cup: 2014

Awards
Preceded by -	Best Outside Spiker of European Championship; 2015 (with (Russia) Tatiana Kosheleva); 2017 (with (Serbia) Brankica Mihajlović)	Succeeded by (Serbia) Brankica Mihajlović (Italy) Miriam Sylla
