= 2010 FIVB Women's Volleyball World Championship =

Volleyball tournament in Japan

2010 FIVB Women's World Championship
バレーボール女子世界選手権 日本 2010

Tournament details
- Host country: Japan
- Dates: 29 October – 14 November
- Teams: 24
- Venues: 6 (in 5 host cities)
- Officially opened by: Akihito

Final positions
- Champions: Russia (7th title)
- Runners-up: Brazil
- Third place: Japan
- Fourth place: United States

Tournament awards
- MVP: (Russia) Ekaterina Gamova
- Best Setter: (China) Wei Qiuyue
- Best OH: (Russia) Tatiana Kosheleva
- Best MB: (Germany) Christiane Fürst
- Best Libero: (United States) Stacy Sykora
- Best Scorer: (Turkey) Neslihan Darnel
- Best Server: (Netherlands) Maret Grothues
- Best Digger: (United States) Stacy Sykora
- Best Receiver: (United States) Logan Tom

The 2010 FIVB Women's World Championship was the sixteenth edition of the competition. Like the previous tournament, the 2010 edition also was held from 29 October to 14 November 2010 in Japan, though the range of venues and locations was modified slightly (Matsumoto and Hamamatsu replaced Sapporo and Kobe in 2010). Twenty-four teams participated in the tournament.

The tournament was won by Russia, who finished with a perfect record, defeating Brazil in the intense final game. Japan defeated the United States for the third place, winning their first bronze medal in the tournament history, and the first medal since 1978, having so far three gold and three silver already to their name. Russia won its second straight title, while Brazil was prevented from achieving a volleyball double of winning both the men's championship and the women's championship in the same year.

Russia's towering outside hitter Yekaterina Gamova was named the tournament's Most Valuable Player.

== Qualification ==
Team	Confederation	Qualified as	Qualified on	Appearance in finals
Japan	AVC	Host	16 November 2006	14th
Russia	CEV	2006 World Championship Winner	16 November 2006	15th^{1}
Dominican Republic	NORCECA	NORCECA Pool H Winner	14 June 2009	6th
Cuba	NORCECA	NORCECA Pool F Winner	23 June 2009	11th
China	AVC	AVC Pool D Winner	4 July 2009	12th
Thailand	AVC	AVC Pool D Runner-up	4 July 2009	3rd
United States	NORCECA	NORCECA Pool G Winner	8 July 2009	14th
Puerto Rico	NORCECA	NORCECA Pool I Winner	9 July 2009	5th
Kenya	CAVB	CAVB Pool C Winner	12 July 2009	5th
Germany	CEV	CEV Pool K Winner	18 July 2009	13th^{2}
Netherlands	CEV	CEV Pool K Runner-up	18 July 2009	12th
Turkey	CEV	CEV Pool J Winner	18 July 2009	2nd
Poland	CEV	CEV Pool J Runner-up	18 July 2009	10th
Serbia	CEV	CEV Pool I Winner	18 July 2009	3rd^{3}
Croatia	CEV	CEV Pool I Runner-up	18 July 2009	2nd
Italy	CEV	CEV Pool H Winner	19 July 2009	9th
Czech Republic	CEV	CEV Pool H Runner-up	19 July 2009	11th^{4}
Algeria	CAVB	CAVB Pool D Winner	24 July 2009	1st
Brazil	CSV	CSV Pool B Winner	25 July 2009	14th
Peru	CSV	CSV Pool B Runner-up	25 July 2009	12th
South Korea	AVC	AVC Pool E Winner	30 August 2009	11th
Kazakhstan	AVC	AVC Pool E Runner-up	30 August 2009	2nd
Canada	NORCECA	NORCECA Pool J Winner	30 August 2009	7th
Costa Rica	NORCECA	NORCECA Pool J Runner-up	30 August 2009	2nd

1.Competed as Soviet Union from 1952 to 1990; 5th appearance as Russia.
2.Competed as West Germany from 1956 to 1990; 5th appearance as Germany.
3.Competed as Yugoslavia for 1978 and Serbia and Montenegro for 2006; 1st appearance as Serbia.
4.Competed as Czechoslovakia from 1952 to 1986; 3rd appearance as Czech Republic.

== Venues ==
The tournament was played at six venues in five cities.

Pool C	Pool A, E, Final round	Final round	Host venues in Tokyo
Matsumoto	Tokyo		Host venues in Tokyo
Matsumoto City Gymnasium	Yoyogi National Gymnasium	Tokyo Metropolitan Gymnasium	Host venues in Tokyo
Capacity: 7,000	Capacity: 12,000	Capacity: 10,000	Host venues in Tokyo
Pool D	Pool F	Pool B	Host cities in Japan
Osaka	Nagoya	Hamamatsu	Host cities in Japan
Osaka Municipal Central Gymnasium	Nippon Gaishi Hall	Hamamatsu Arena	Host cities in Japan
Capacity: 8,200	Capacity: 10,000	Capacity: 8,000	Host cities in Japan

== Format ==
The tournament was played in three different stages (first, second and final rounds). In the First round, the 24 participants were divided in four groups of six teams each. A single round-robin format was played within each group to determine the teams group position, the four best teams of each group (total of 16 teams) progressed to the next round.

In the Second round, the 16 teams were divided in two groups of eight teams. A single round-robin format was played within each group to determine the teams group position, matches already played between teams in the First round were counted in this round. The six best teams of each group (total of 12 teams) progressed to the next round.

In the Final round, the 12 teams were allocated to semifinals for placement matches according to their Second round group positions. First and second of each group played the semifinals, third and fourth played the 5th-8th semifinals and fifth and sixth played the 9th-12th semifinals. Winners and losers of each semifinals played a final placement match for 1st to 12th places.

Source:FIVB

== Pools composition ==
Teams were seeded in the first three positions of each pool following the Serpentine system according to their FIVB World Ranking. FIVB reserved the right to seed the hosts as head of Pool A regardless of the World Ranking. All teams not seeded were drawn to take other available positions in the remaining lines, following the World Ranking. The drawing was held in November 2009. The rankings displayed in this table are from August 2010.

Pool A	Pool B	Pool C	Pool D
Japan (5) Host	Brazil (1)	United States (2)	China (3)
Serbia (8)	Italy (4)	Cuba (6)	Russia (7)
Poland (9)	Netherlands (10)	Germany (15)	South Korea (21)
Peru (17)	Kenya (35)	Kazakhstan (16)	Dominican Republic (11)
Algeria (14)	Puerto Rico (13)	Thailand (12)	Turkey (22)
Costa Rica (31)	Czech Republic (38)	Croatia (45)	Canada (24)

== Results ==
All times are Japan Standard Time (UTC+09:00).

=== First round ===
==== Pool A ====
Venue: Yoyogi National Gymnasium, Tokyo

Pos	Team	Pld	W	L	Pts	SW	SL	SR	SPW	SPL	SPR	Qualification
1	Japan	5	5	0	10	15	4	3.750	461	351	1.313	Second round
2	Serbia	5	4	1	9	13	5	2.600	441	378	1.167	Second round
3	Poland	5	3	2	8	12	6	2.000	429	336	1.277	Second round
4	Peru	5	2	3	7	8	10	0.800	379	398	0.952	Second round
5	Costa Rica	5	1	4	6	4	12	0.333	282	381	0.740	
6	Algeria	5	0	5	5	0	15	0.000	227	375	0.605	

Date	Time		Score		Set 1	Set 2	Set 3	Set 4	Set 5	Total	Report
29 Oct	12:30	Peru	3–0	Algeria	25–16	25–12	25–18			75–46	P2 P3
29 Oct	15:00	Serbia	3–0	Costa Rica	25–15	25–18	25–14			75–47	P2 P3
29 Oct	18:45	Poland	2–3	Japan	28–26	25–21	20–25	23–25	12–15	108–112	P2 P3
30 Oct	12:30	Costa Rica	3–0	Algeria	25–18	25–21	25–10			75–49	P2 P3
30 Oct	15:00	Serbia	3–1	Poland	19–25	27–25	26–24	25–22		97–96	P2 P3
30 Oct	19:00	Japan	3–1	Peru	25–15	25–17	22–25	25–14		97–71	P2 P3
31 Oct	12:30	Peru	1–3	Serbia	21–25	25–16	21–25	18–25		85–91	P2 P3
31 Oct	15:00	Poland	3–0	Costa Rica	25–14	25–12	25–15			75–41	P2 P3
31 Oct	18:00	Algeria	0–3	Japan	18–25	7–25	14–25			39–75	P2 P3
2 Nov	13:00	Serbia	3–0	Algeria	25–15	25–12	25–21			75–48	P2 P3
2 Nov	15:30	Poland	3–0	Peru	25–10	25–15	25–16			75–41	P2 P3
2 Nov	18:45	Costa Rica	0–3	Japan	9–25	13–25	8–25			30–75	P2 P3
3 Nov	12:30	Peru	3–1	Costa Rica	25–18	25–18	32–34	25–19		107–89	P2 P3
3 Nov	15:00	Algeria	0–3	Poland	17–25	16–25	12–25			45–75	P2 P3
3 Nov	18:00	Japan	3–1	Serbia	28–26	29–27	18–25	27–25		102–103	P2 P3

==== Pool B ====
Venue: Hamamatsu Arena, Hamamatsu

Pos	Team	Pld	W	L	Pts	SW	SL	SR	SPW	SPL	SPR	Qualification
1	Brazil	5	5	0	10	15	2	7.500	410	294	1.395	Second round
2	Netherlands	5	3	2	8	11	6	1.833	386	316	1.222	Second round
3	Italy	5	3	2	8	11	8	1.375	417	389	1.072	Second round
4	Czech Republic	5	3	2	8	11	8	1.375	428	402	1.065	Second round
5	Puerto Rico	5	1	4	6	3	12	0.250	268	362	0.740	
6	Kenya	5	0	5	5	0	15	0.000	229	375	0.611	

Date	Time		Score		Set 1	Set 2	Set 3	Set 4	Set 5	Total	Report
29 Oct	13:30	Brazil	3–0	Kenya	25–15	25–16	25–11			75–42	P2 P3
29 Oct	16:15	Czech Republic	0–3	Netherlands	24–26	20–25	14–25			58–76	P2 P3
29 Oct	18:45	Puerto Rico	0–3	Italy	20–25	11–25	18–25			49–75	P2 P3
30 Oct	13:00	Czech Republic	2–3	Brazil	25–22	22–25	25–23	20–25	9–15	101–110	P2 P3
30 Oct	15:35	Kenya	0–3	Puerto Rico	20–25	23–25	19–25			62–75	P2 P3
30 Oct	18:00	Netherlands	2–3	Italy	25–18	21–25	23–25	28–26	12–15	109–109	P2 P3
31 Oct	13:00	Puerto Rico	0–3	Czech Republic	14–25	14–25	17–25			45–75	P2 P3
31 Oct	15:30	Italy	3–0	Kenya	25–9	25–7	25–21			75–37	P2 P3
31 Oct	18:00	Brazil	3–0	Netherlands	25–19	25–18	25–14			75–51	P2 P3
2 Nov	13:30	Brazil	3–0	Puerto Rico	25–20	25–18	25–20			75–58	P2 P3
2 Nov	16:15	Netherlands	3–0	Kenya	25–8	25–14	25–11			75–33	P2 P3
2 Nov	18:45	Czech Republic	3–2	Italy	25–27	27–29	25–23	25–22	17–15	119–116	P2 P3
3 Nov	13:00	Puerto Rico	0–3	Netherlands	12–25	13–25	16–25			41–75	P2 P3
3 Nov	15:30	Kenya	0–3	Czech Republic	20–25	15–25	20–25			55–75	P2 P3
3 Nov	18:00	Italy	0–3	Brazil	16–25	19–25	7–25			42–75	P2 P3

==== Pool C ====
Venue: Matsumoto City Gymnasium, Matsumoto

Pos	Team	Pld	W	L	Pts	SW	SL	SR	SPW	SPL	SPR	Qualification
1	United States	5	5	0	10	15	2	7.500	426	350	1.217	Second round
2	Germany	5	4	1	9	12	3	4.000	366	293	1.249	Second round
3	Cuba	5	2	3	7	7	11	0.636	430	433	0.993	Second round
4	Thailand	5	2	3	7	7	10	0.700	360	375	0.960	Second round
5	Croatia	5	2	3	7	6	9	0.667	320	356	0.899	
6	Kazakhstan	5	0	5	5	3	15	0.200	335	430	0.779	

Date	Time		Score		Set 1	Set 2	Set 3	Set 4	Set 5	Total	Report
29 Oct	13:30	Germany	3–0	Kazakhstan	25–21	25–14	25–16			75–51	P2 P3
29 Oct	16:15	United States	3–1	Thailand	23–25	25–17	25–17	25–21		98–80	P2 P3
29 Oct	19:00	Croatia	3–0	Cuba	25–23	34–32	25–21			84–76	P2 P3
30 Oct	13:00	United States	3–0	Croatia	25–16	25–13	25–23			75–52	P2 P3
30 Oct	15:30	Thailand	3–1	Kazakhstan	25–16	25–18	20–25	25–16		95–75	P2 P3
30 Oct	18:00	Cuba	0–3	Germany	24–26	17–25	23–25			64–76	P2 P3
31 Oct	13:00	Kazakhstan	2–3	Cuba	25–20	15–25	25–27	25–23	10–15	100–110	P2 P3
31 Oct	15:45	Croatia	0–3	Thailand	15–25	14–25	17–25			46–75	P2 P3
31 Oct	18:00	Germany	0–3	United States	23–25	24–26	17–25			64–76	P2 P3
2 Nov	13:30	Croatia	0–3	Germany	24–26	18–25	21–25			63–76	P2 P3
2 Nov	16:15	Thailand	0–3	Cuba	19–25	27–29	25–27			71–81	P2 P3
2 Nov	18:45	United States	3–0	Kazakhstan	25–17	25–19	25–19			75–55	P2 P3
3 Nov	13:00	Kazakhstan	0–3	Croatia	19–25	17–25	18–25			54–75	P2 P3
3 Nov	15:30	Germany	3–0	Thailand	25–14	25–15	25–10			75–39	P2 P3
3 Nov	18:00	Cuba	1–3	United States	28–30	23–25	25–22	23–25		99–102	P2 P3

==== Pool D ====
Venue: Osaka Municipal Central Gymnasium, Osaka

Pos	Team	Pld	W	L	Pts	SW	SL	SR	SPW	SPL	SPR	Qualification
1	Russia	5	5	0	10	15	3	5.000	440	329	1.337	Second round
2	South Korea	5	4	1	9	13	5	2.600	411	389	1.057	Second round
3	Turkey	5	3	2	8	12	11	1.091	493	464	1.063	Second round
4	China	5	2	3	7	7	9	0.778	352	336	1.048	Second round
5	Dominican Republic	5	1	4	6	6	13	0.462	377	445	0.847	
6	Canada	5	0	5	5	3	15	0.200	318	428	0.743	

Date	Time		Score		Set 1	Set 2	Set 3	Set 4	Set 5	Total	Report
29 Oct	13:30	Russia	3–1	Dominican Republic	21–25	25–9	25–17	25–11		96–62	P2 P3
29 Oct	16:15	Canada	0–3	South Korea	19–25	19–25	14–25			52–75	P2 P3
29 Oct	18:45	Turkey	3–1	China	19–25	25–14	25–20	25–17		94–76	P2 P3
30 Oct	13:00	Russia	3–1	Turkey	25–27	25–22	25–11	25–17		100–77	P2 P3
30 Oct	15:30	Dominican Republic	0–3	South Korea	27–29	23–25	20–25			70–79	P2 P3
30 Oct	18:00	China	3–0	Canada	25–16	25–19	25–10			75–45	P2 P3
31 Oct	13:00	Turkey	3–2	Dominican Republic	25–20	25–14	23–25	23–25	17–15	113–99	P2 P3
31 Oct	15:45	Canada	0–3	Russia	13–25	16–25	21–25			50–75	P2 P3
31 Oct	18:00	South Korea	3–0	China	25–22	25–23	25–23			75–68	P2 P3
2 Nov	13:30	Turkey	3–2	Canada	19–25	20–25	25–14	25–17	15–8	104–89	P2 P3
2 Nov	16:15	Russia	3–1	South Korea	25–18	25–17	19–25	25–22		94–82	P2 P3
2 Nov	28:45	Dominican Republic	0–3	China	12–25	21–25	14–25			47–75	P2 P3
3 Nov	13:00	Canada	1–3	Dominican Republic	25–21	26–28	11–25	20–25		82–99	P2 P3
3 Nov	15:30	South Korea	3–2	Turkey	16–25	25–21	25–21	19–25	15–13	100–105	P2 P3
3 Nov	18:00	China	0–3	Russia	22–25	17–25	19–25			58–75	P2 P3

=== Second round ===
The results and the points of the matches between the same teams that were already played during the first round are taken into account for the second round.

==== Pool E ====
Venue: Yoyogi National Gymnasium, Tokyo

Pos	Team	Pld	W	L	Pts	SW	SL	SR	SPW	SPL	SPR	Qualification
1	Russia	7	7	0	14	21	3	7.000	600	448	1.339	Finals
2	Japan	7	5	2	12	17	11	1.545	644	616	1.045	Finals
3	Serbia	7	4	3	11	13	12	1.083	556	577	0.964	5th–8th places
4	Turkey	7	3	4	10	14	13	1.077	598	583	1.026	5th–8th places
5	Poland	7	3	4	10	12	15	0.800	612	604	1.013	9th–12th places
6	China	7	3	4	10	11	13	0.846	543	549	0.989	9th–12th places
7	South Korea	7	3	4	10	12	15	0.800	569	600	0.948	
8	Peru	7	0	7	7	3	21	0.143	442	587	0.753	

Date	Time		Score		Set 1	Set 2	Set 3	Set 4	Set 5	Total	Report
6 Nov	10:30	Serbia	0–3	Turkey	19–25	16–25	20–25			55–75	P2 P3
6 Nov	12:45	Peru	0–3	Russia	15–25	15–25	20–25			50–75	P2 P3
6 Nov	15:00	Poland	3–2	South Korea	12–25	25–17	25–18	22–25	17–15	101–100	P2 P3
6 Nov	18:00	Japan	1–3	China	23–25	23–25	29–27	12–25		87–102	P2 P3
7 Nov	10:30	Peru	1–3	South Korea	26–24	15–25	18–25	23–25		82–99	P2 P3
7 Nov	12:45	Serbia	3–1	China	21–25	25–20	25–22	25–22		96–89	P2 P3
7 Nov	15:00	Poland	0–3	Russia	17–25	21–25	31–33			69–83	P2 P3
7 Nov	18:00	Japan	3–1	Turkey	25–19	23–25	25–19	25–13		98–76	P2 P3
9 Nov	11:15	Serbia	0–3	Russia	19–25	8–25	12–25			39–75	P2 P3
9 Nov	13:30	Peru	0–3	Turkey	15–25	18–25	20–25			53–75	P2 P3
9 Nov	15:45	Poland	0–3	China	21–25	23–25	18–25			62–75	P2 P3
9 Nov	18:45	Japan	3–0	South Korea	25–22	25–17	25–19			75–58	P2 P3
10 Nov	11:15	Peru	0–3	China	17–25	22–25	21–25			60–75	P2 P3
10 Nov	13:30	Serbia	3–0	South Korea	25–17	25–22	25–16			75–55	P2 P3
10 Nov	15:45	Poland	3–1	Turkey	25–23	24–26	27–25	25–22		101–96	P2 P3
10 Nov	18:45	Japan	1–3	Russia	21–25	14–25	25–23	13–25		73–98	P2 P3

==== Pool F ====
Venue: Nippon Gaishi Hall, Nagoya

Pos	Team	Pld	W	L	Pts	SW	SL	SR	SPW	SPL	SPR	Qualification
1	Brazil	7	7	0	14	21	4	5.250	607	461	1.317	Finals
2	United States	7	5	2	12	17	8	2.125	605	555	1.090	Finals
3	Germany	7	4	3	11	13	10	1.300	514	475	1.082	5th–8th places
4	Italy	7	4	3	11	16	13	1.231	668	629	1.062	5th–8th places
5	Cuba	7	3	4	10	12	15	0.800	604	660	0.915	9th–12th places
6	Netherlands	7	2	5	9	10	16	0.625	553	573	0.965	9th–12th places
7	Thailand	7	2	5	9	7	17	0.412	470	577	0.815	
8	Czech Republic	7	1	6	8	7	20	0.350	555	646	0.859	

Date	Time		Score		Set 1	Set 2	Set 3	Set 4	Set 5	Total	Report
06 Nov	11:00	Netherlands	3–1	Cuba	25–12	22–25	25–12	25–20		97–69	P2 P3
06 Nov	13:15	Czech Republic	0–3	United States	20–25	20–25	13–25			53–75	P2 P3
06 Nov	15:30	Brazil	3–0	Thailand	25–19	25–19	25–16			75–54	P2 P3
06 Nov	18:00	Italy	3–1	Germany	22–25	32–30	25–8	25–15		104–78	P2 P3
07 Nov	11:00	Netherlands	1–3	Thailand	15–25	23–25	25–15	24–26		87–91	P2 P3
07 Nov	13:15	Czech Republic	0–3	Germany	8–25	17–25	16–25			41–75	P2 P3
07 Nov	15:30	Brazil	3–1	Cuba	23–25	25–20	25–13	25–18		98–76	P2 P3
07 Nov	18:00	Italy	3–1	United States	25–16	24–26	27–25	27–25		103–92	P2 P3
09 Nov	11:45	Czech Republic	1–3	Cuba	22–25	30–28	22–25	23–25		97–103	P2 P3
09 Nov	14:00	Brazil	3–0	Germany	25–16	25–13	25–21			75–50	P2 P3
09 Nov	16:15	Italy	3–0	Thailand	25–13	25–12	25–19			75–44	P2 P3
09 Nov	18:30	Netherlands	0–3	United States	17–25	22–25	18–25			57–75	P2 P3
10 Nov	11:45	Czech Republic	1–3	Thailand	25–16	18–25	20–25	23–25		86–91	P2 P3
10 Nov	14:00	Brazil	3–1	United States	25–19	24–26	25–19	25–23		99–87	P2 P3
10 Nov	16:15	Netherlands	1–3	Germany	12–25	14–25	25–19	25–27		76–96	P2 P3
10 Nov	18:30	Italy	2–3	Cuba	25–16	24–26	25–21	23–25	22–24	119–112	P2 P3

=== Final round ===
==== 9th–12th place ====
Venues: Yoyogi National Gymnasium (YNG) and Tokyo Metropolitan Gymnasium (TMG), both in Tokyo

9th–12th semifinals
13 November
Poland	3
Netherlands	2
13 November
Cuba	1
China	3

9th place
14 November
Poland	3
China	0
11th place
14 November
Netherlands	3
Cuba	0

===== 9th–12th semifinals =====
Date	Time	Venue		Score		Set 1	Set 2	Set 3	Set 4	Set 5	Total	Report
13 Nov	12:30	YNG	Poland	3–2	Netherlands	24–26	25–22	25–22	19–25	15–9	108–104	108–104
13 Nov	13:00	TMG	Cuba	1–3	China	25–16	22–25	19–25	22–25		88–91	88–91

===== 11th place match =====
Date	Time	Venue		Score		Set 1	Set 2	Set 3	Set 4	Set 5	Total	Report
14 Nov	13:00	TMG	Netherlands	3–0	Cuba	32–30	25–23	25–17			82–70	82–70

===== 9th place match =====
Date	Time	Venue		Score		Set 1	Set 2	Set 3	Set 4	Set 5	Total	Report
14 Nov	14:00	YNG	Poland	3–0	China	25–23	25–21	25–22			75–66	75–66

==== 5th–8th place ====
Venue: Tokyo Metropolitan Gymnasium, Tokyo

5th–8th semifinals
13 November
Serbia	0
Italy	3
13 November
Germany	2
Turkey	3

5th place
14 November
Italy	3
Turkey	0
7th place
14 November
Serbia	1
Germany	3

===== 5th–8th semifinals =====
Date	Time		Score		Set 1	Set 2	Set 3	Set 4	Set 5	Total	Report
13 Nov	15:30	Germany	2–3	Turkey	23–25	18–25	25–14	25–20	11–15	102–99	P2 P3
13 Nov	18:00	Serbia	0–3	Italy	20–25	15–25	22–25			57–75	P2 P3

===== 7th place match =====
Date	Time		Score		Set 1	Set 2	Set 3	Set 4	Set 5	Total	Report
14 Nov	15:30	Serbia	1–3	Germany	25–20	21–25	22–25	23–25		91–95	P2 P3

===== 5th place match =====
Date	Time		Score		Set 1	Set 2	Set 3	Set 4	Set 5	Total	Report
14 Nov	18:00	Italy	3–0	Turkey	25–23	25–20	25–21			75–64	P2 P3

==== Finals ====
Venue: Yoyogi National Gymnasium, Tokyo

Semifinals
13 November
Russia	3
United States	1
13 November
Brazil	3
Japan	2

Final
14 November
Russia	3
Brazil	2
3rd place
14 November
United States	2
Japan	3

===== Semifinals =====
Date	Time		Score		Set 1	Set 2	Set 3	Set 4	Set 5	Total	Report
13 Nov	15:00	Russia	3–1	United States	25–16	13–25	25–19	25–21		88–81	P2 P3
13 Nov	18:00	Brazil	3–2	Japan	22–25	33–35	25–22	25–22	15–11	120–115	P2 P3

===== 3rd place match =====
Date	Time		Score		Set 1	Set 2	Set 3	Set 4	Set 5	Total	Report
14 Nov	17:00	United States	2–3	Japan	25–18	23–25	25–21	19–25	8–15	100–104	P2 P3

===== Final =====
The final was a repeat of the 2006 final, between Russia and Brazil. Both teams had cruised through the group stages undefeated, though Brazil got to the final after winning a tough five-set semifinal match with Japan the day before.

Russia was forced to rally from a set down twice, winning in five sets (21–25, 25–17, 20–25, 25–14, 15–11). Russia's 2.02-meter-tall (6.6 ft) Yekaterina Gamova led all scorers with a tournament-high 35 points, while Sheilla Castro led Brazil with 26.

The match was played at the Yoyogi National Stadium in Tokyo in front of a crowd of 12,000.

Date	Time		Score		Set 1	Set 2	Set 3	Set 4	Set 5	Total	Report
14 Nov	19:45	Russia	3–2	Brazil	21–25	25–17	20–25	25–14	15–11	106–92	P2 P3

== Final standing ==
Rank	Team
1st place, gold medalist(s)	Russia
2nd place, silver medalist(s)	Brazil
3rd place, bronze medalist(s)	Japan
4	United States
5	Italy
6	Turkey
7	Germany
8	Serbia
9	Poland
10	China
11	Netherlands
12	Cuba
13	South Korea
13	Thailand
15	Czech Republic
15	Peru
17	Costa Rica
17	Croatia
17	Dominican Republic
17	Puerto Rico
21	Algeria
21	Canada
21	Kazakhstan
21	Kenya

2010 Women's World champions

Russia
7th title

Team roster
Maria Borodakova, Lesya Makhno, Maria Perepelkina, Elena Murtazaeva, Lioubov Shashkova, Svetlana Kryuchkova, Nataliya Goncharova, Olga Fateeva, Ekaterina Gamova, Vera Ulyakina, Evgeniya Startseva, Ekaterina Kabeshova, Tatiana Kosheleva, Yulia Merkulova
Head coach
Vladimir Kuzyutkin

== Awards ==
- Most valuable player
  (Russia) Yekaterina Gamova
- Best scorer
  (Turkey) Neslihan Darnel
- Best spiker
  (Russia) Tatiana Kosheleva
- Best blocker
  (Germany) Christiane Fürst
- Best server
  (Netherlands) Maret Grothues
- Best digger
  (United States) Stacy Sykora
- Best receiver
  (United States) Logan Tom
- Best setter
  (China) Wei Qiuyue
- Best libero
  (United States) Stacy Sykora
