= 2010 FIVB Women's Volleyball World Championship qualification =

24 teams competed in the 2010 FIVB Women's World Championship, with two place allocated for the hosts, Japan and titleholder, Russia. In the qualification process for the 2010 FIVB World Championship, the Five FIVB confederations were allocated a share of the 22 remaining spots. The distribution is:

== Qualified teams ==
Team	Confederation	Qualified as	Qualified on	Appearance in finals
Japan	AVC	Host	16 November 2006	14th
Russia	CEV	2006 World Championship Winner	16 November 2006	15th^{1}
Dominican Republic	NORCECA	NORCECA Pool H Winner	14 June 2009	6th
Cuba	NORCECA	NORCECA Pool F Winner	23 June 2009	11th
China	AVC	AVC Pool D Winner	4 July 2009	12th
Thailand	AVC	AVC Pool D Runner-up	4 July 2009	3rd
United States	NORCECA	NORCECA Pool G Winner	8 July 2009	14th
Puerto Rico	NORCECA	NORCECA Pool I Winner	9 July 2009	5th
Kenya	CAVB	CAVB Pool C Winner	12 July 2009	5th
Germany	CEV	CEV Pool K Winner	18 July 2009	13th^{2}
Netherlands	CEV	CEV Pool K Runner-up	18 July 2009	12th
Turkey	CEV	CEV Pool J Winner	18 July 2009	2nd
Poland	CEV	CEV Pool J Runner-up	18 July 2009	10th
Serbia	CEV	CEV Pool I Winner	18 July 2009	3rd^{3}
Croatia	CEV	CEV Pool I Runner-up	18 July 2009	2nd
Italy	CEV	CEV Pool H Winner	19 July 2009	9th
Czech Republic	CEV	CEV Pool H Runner-up	19 July 2009	11th^{4}
Algeria	CAVB	CAVB Pool D Winner	24 July 2009	1st
Brazil	CSV	CSV Pool B Winner	25 July 2009	14th
Peru	CSV	CSV Pool B Runner-up	25 July 2009	12th
South Korea	AVC	AVC Pool E Winner	30 August 2009	11th
Kazakhstan	AVC	AVC Pool E Runner-up	30 August 2009	2nd
Canada	NORCECA	NORCECA Pool J Winner	30 August 2009	7th
Costa Rica	NORCECA	NORCECA Pool J Runner-up	30 August 2009	2nd

1. Competed as Soviet Union from 1952 to 1990; 5th appearance as Russia.
2. Competed as West Germany from 1956 to 1990; 5th appearance as Germany.
3. Competed as Yugoslavia for 1978 and Serbia and Montenegro for 2006; 1st appearance as Serbia.
4. Competed as Czechoslovakia from 1952 to 1986; 3rd appearance as Czech Republic.

== Confederation qualification processes ==
The distribution by confederation for the 2010 FIVB Women's Volleyball World Championship was:

- Asia and Oceania (AVC): 4 places (+ Japan qualified automatically as host nation for a total of 5 places)
- Africa (CAVB): 2 places
- Europe (CEV): 8 places (+ Russia qualified automatically as the defending champions for a total of 9 places)
- South America (CSV) 2 places
- North, Central America and Caribbean (NORCECA): 6 places

=== AVC ===
- Bangladesh (Second Round)
- China (Third Round)
- Chinese Taipei (Second Round, Third Round)
- Fiji (First Round, Second Round, Third Round)
- Kazakhstan (Second Round, Third Round)
- New Zealand (First Round, Second Round, Third Round)
- Samoa (First Round)
- South Korea (Third Round)
- Thailand (Second Round, Third Round)
- Tonga (First Round)
- Uzbekistan (Second Round, Third Round)

=== CAVB ===
- Algeria (Third Round)
- Botswana (Second Round)
- Cameroon (Second Round, Third Round)
- Egypt (Third Round)
- Kenya (Third Round)
- Mauritius (Second Round, Third Round)
- Mozambique (Second Round)
- Nigeria (Second Round)
- Senegal (Second Round, Third Round)
- South Africa (Second Round, Third Round)
- Eswatini (Second Round)
- Tunisia (Third Round)
- Zimbabwe (Second Round)

=== CEV ===
- Albania (Second Round)
- Austria (First Round)
- Azerbaijan (Second Round, Third Round)
- Belarus (Second Round, Third Round)
- Belgium (Second Round, Third Round)
- Bosnia and Herzegovina (First Round)
- Bulgaria (Second Round, Third Round)
- Croatia (Second Round, Third Round)
- Czech Republic (Second Round, Third Round)
- Denmark (First Round)
- Estonia (First Round)
- Finland (Second Round)
- France (Second Round, Third Round)
- Georgia (First Round)
- Germany (Third Round)
- Great Britain (First Round)
- Greece (Second Round)
- Hungary (First Round, Second Round)
- Israel (First Round, Second Round)
- Italy (Third Round)
- Moldova (First Round, Second Round)
- Montenegro (First Round)
- Netherlands (Third Round)
- Poland (Third Round)
- Portugal (First Round)
- Romania (Second Round, Third Round)
- Serbia (Third Round)
- Slovakia (Second Round)
- Slovenia (First Round, Second Round, Third Round)
- Spain (Second Round, Third Round)
- Turkey (Third Round)
- Ukraine (Second Round)

=== CSV ===
- Argentina (Second Round, Third Round)
- Bolivia (Second Round)
- Brazil (Third Round)
- Chile (Second Round)
- Colombia (Second Round)
- Peru (Third Round)
- Uruguay (Second Round)
- Venezuela (Second Round, Third Round)

=== NORCECA ===
- Anguilla (First Round)
- Antigua and Barbuda (First Round)
- Aruba (Second Round)
- Bahamas (Second Round, Third Round)
- Barbados (Second Round, Third Round)
- Belize (Second Round)
- Bermuda (First Round, Second Round)
- British Virgin Islands (First Round)
- Canada (Third Round, Playoff Round)
- Cayman Islands (Second Round)
- Costa Rica (Third Round, Playoff Round)
- Cuba (Third Round)
- Dominica (First Round)
- Dominican Republic (Third Round)
- El Salvador (Second Round)
- Grenada (First Round)
- Guatemala (Second Round, Third Round)
- Haiti (Second Round)
- Honduras (Second Round)
- Jamaica (Second Round, Third Round)
- Mexico (Third Round, Playoff Round)
- Netherlands Antilles (Second Round, Third Round)
- Nicaragua (Second Round, Third Round)
- Panama (Second Round, Third Round)
- Puerto Rico (Third Round)
- Saint Kitts and Nevis (First Round)
- Saint Lucia (First Round, Second Round)
- Saint Vincent and the Grenadines (First Round)
- Suriname (Second Round)
- Trinidad and Tobago (Second Round, Third Round, Playoff Round)
- U.S. Virgin Islands (Second Round, Third Round)
- United States (Third Round)
