= Dutch Women's 2 Volleyball League =

Topdivisie dames
- Current season, competition or edition: 2020–21 Volleyball Topdivisie dames
- Sport: Volleyball
- Founded: 2008
- First season: 2008
- Administrator: Nevobo
- No. of teams: 12 (2019–20)
- Country: Netherlands
- Continent: Europe
- Level on pyramid: 2nd tier
- Domestic cup: Dutch Cup
- Website: https://www.volleybal.nl/

The Dutch Women's Volleyball 2nd League or More precisely the Top Division is Netherlands second national Division in women's volleyball and it is organized by the Dutch Volleyball Association.

Between 2007/08 and 2011/12 it was called the B-League. Until the 2006/07 season it was played in two First Divisions. The league now has twelve teams and The champion with 2nd and third placed teams acquires the right to promote to the Dutch Women's Volleyball League.

For the 2020/21 season, Top Division was expanded to include a second pool of twelve teams. This was partly in connection with the unfinished season due to the corona pandemic in 2020.

== List of champions ==
Seasons	Champions
2007/08	VC Weert
2008/09	Summa Peelpush
2009/10	VC Sneek
2010/11	SV Dynamo
2011/12	VCN King Software *
2012/13	Springendal Set-Up'65
2013/14	VC Zwolle
2014/15	Oskam Taurus
2015/16	Flamingo's
2016/17	PrismaWorx VC Weert
2017/18	Ecare Apollo 8
2018/19	Peelpush
2019/20	cancelled

== 2020/21 team squads ==
Topdivisie Group A Donitas Dynamo Apeldoorn Rabobank Orion Doetinchem SOMCOM/Sudosa-Desto VoCASA Apollo 8 Dros-Alterno Dynamo Tubbergen IBM.../Veracles Krekkers Pharmafilter US VC Sneek	Topdivisie Group B Booleans/VV Utrecht IMS/Voltena Pharmafilter US Prima Donna kaas Huizen Sliedrecht Sport Ledûb Volleybal Merkala Zaanstad Rivo Rijssen SOMAS/Activia VCN Volley Tilburg VollinGo (Gouda)
