= Jeroen Rauwerdink =

Dutch volleyball player

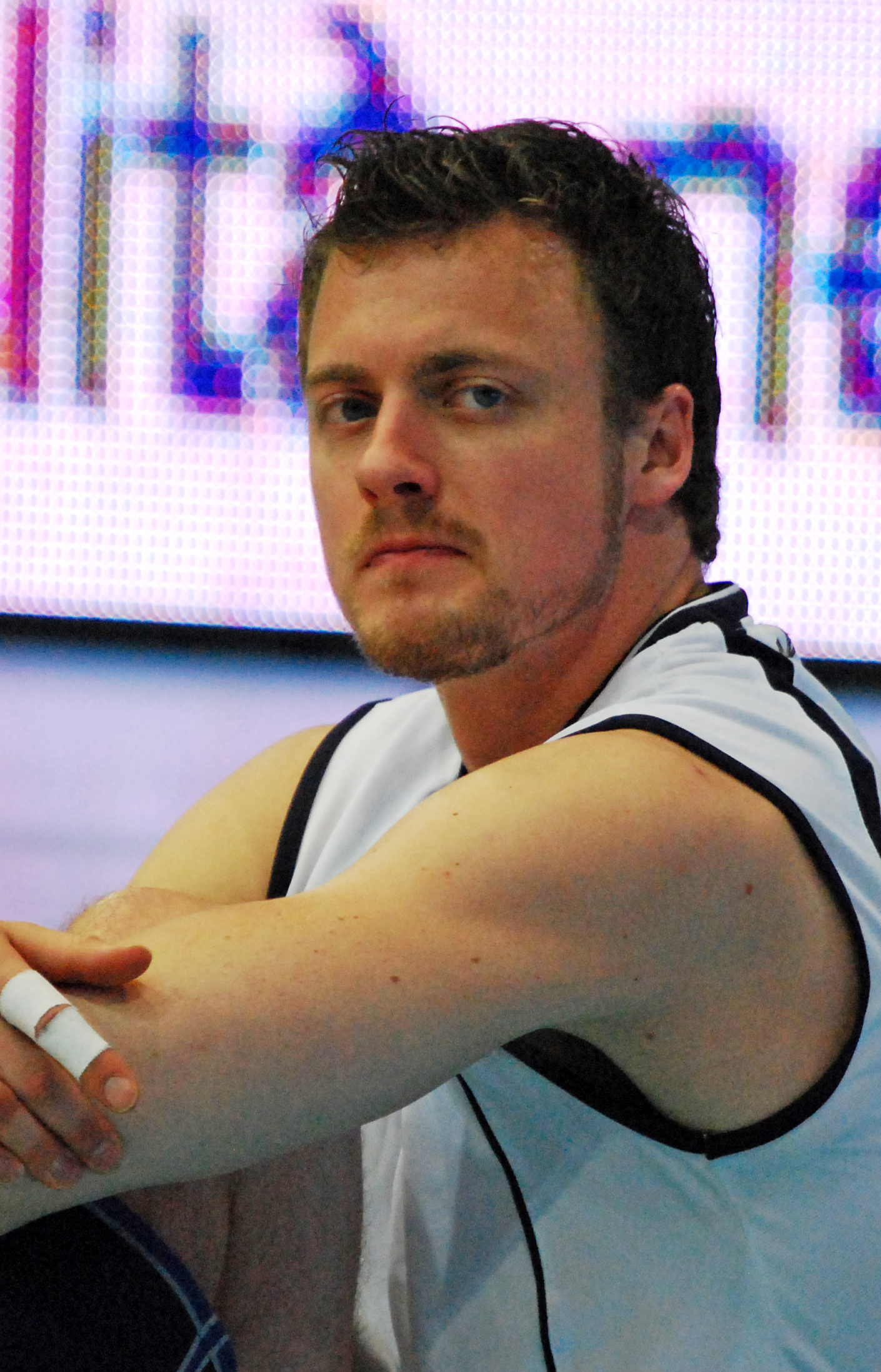

Personal information
- Nationality: Dutch
- Born: 13 September 1985 (age 41); Zeist, Netherlands
- Height: 2.00 m (6 ft 7 in)
- Weight: 92 kg (203 lb)
- Spike: 351 cm (138 in)
- Block: 322 cm (127 in)

Volleyball information
- Position: Outside spiker
- Current club: Dynamo Apeldoorn
- Number: 2

Career
Years	Teams
2001–2008; 2008–2011; 2011–2012; 2012–2013; 2013–2014; 2014–2015; 2015–2017; 2017–2019; 2019–	(Netherlands) Dynamo Apeldoorn (Italy) Gabeca Pallavolo (Italy) Umbria Volley (Italy) Top Volley Latina (Italy) Piemonte Volley Cuneo (Italy) Top Volley Latina (Turkey) Ziraat Bankası Ankara (Greece) Olympiacos Piraeus (Netherlands) Dynamo Apeldoorn

National team
2003–	Netherlands (337)

Jeroen Rauwerdink (born 13 September 1985) is a Dutch male volleyball player. He is part of the Netherlands men's national volleyball team. On club level he plays for Dynamo Apeldoorn. Jeroen Rauwerdink is, with his 337 caps (on 26 April 2021), the third most capped player in the national team.

== Sporting achievements ==
=== Clubs ===
==== CEV Cup ====
- 2002/2003 - with Dynamo Apeldoorn
- 2012/2013 - with Top Volley Latina

==== National championships ====
- 2002/2003 Dutch Championship, with Dynamo Apeldoorn
- 2006/2007 Dutch Championship, with Dynamo Apeldoorn
- 2007/2008 Dutch Championship, with Dynamo Apeldoorn
- 2017/2018 Greek Championship, with Olympiacos Piraeus
- 2018/2019 Greek Championship, with Olympiacos Piraeus

==== National trophies ====
- 2006/2007 Dutch SuperCup 2007, with Dynamo Apeldoorn
- 2001/2002 Dutch Cup, with Dynamo Apeldoorn
- 2007/2008 Dutch Cup, with Dynamo Apeldoorn

==== Greek League Cup ====
- 2017/2018 Greek League Cup, with Olympiacos Piraeus
- 2018/2019 Greek League Cup, with Olympiacos Piraeus

=== Individually ===
- 2018-19 Greek Championship MVP

=== National team ===
- 2006 European League
- 2008 European League
- 2012 European League
