= Eva Yaneva =

Bulgarian volleyball player

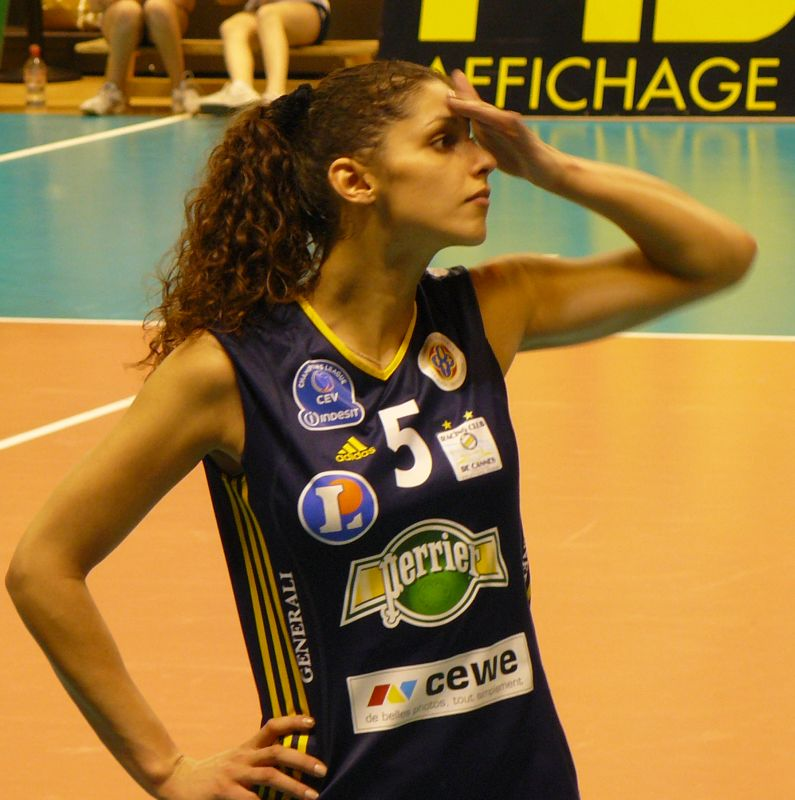

Personal information
- Born: 31 July 1985 (age 41); Sofia, Bulgaria
- Height: 1.85 m (6 ft 1 in)
- Weight: 75 kg (165 lb)
- Spike: 298 cm (117 in)
- Block: 290 cm (114 in)

Volleyball information
- Position: outside hitter
- Current club: Volero Le Cannet
- Number: 8

National team
Bulgaria

Eva Yaneva (Bulgarian Cyrillic: Ева Янева, born 31 July 1985 in Sofia) is a Bulgarian volleyball player. She currently plays for Volero Le Cannet in France.

== Career ==
She started playing volleyball in 1996 at the age of 11 with CSKA Sofia.

Yaneva has played for teams that finished 7th and 8th in the 2004 and 2006 European Championships, respectively; the 2006 champion of the French Cup; and three champions of Bulgaria.

== National team ==
Yaneva is a key player for the Bulgaria women's national volleyball team and has captained it on occasions. In 2011, she was banned from participating in the 2011 Women's European Volleyball Championship due to supposed disciplinary breaches, but has since then been reinstated to the national side and continues to be a regular for the team. She competed at the 2021 Women's European Volleyball League, winning a gold medal.

== Clubs ==
- (Bulgaria) CSKA Sofia (1996-2004)
- (Russia) Indesit Lipetsk (2004-2005)
- (France) RC Cannes (2005-2010)
- (Russia) Omichka Omsk (2010-2011)
- (Russia) Dynamo Moscow (2011-2012)
- (Japan) JT Marvelous (2012-2013)
- (France) RC Cannes (2013-2014)
- (Russia) Dynamo Kazan (2014-2015)
- (Romania) CSM București (January 2015-May 2015)
- (China) Tianjin Volleyball (2015-2016)
- (Turkey) Sarıyer Bld. (2016-2017)
- (China) Guangdong Evergrande Volleyball Club (Women) (2017-2018)
- (Slovakia) Strabag VC FTVS UK Bratislava (2018-2019)
- (Poland) KS Developres Rzeszów (Jan. 2019 - May 2019)
- (France) Volero Le Cannet (2019 - )

== Awards ==
=== National team ===
Women's European Volleyball League

- (silver) : 2010, 2012
- (bronze) : 2009, 2011

Boris Yeltsin Volleyball Cup

- (gold) : 2014
- (silver) : 2008

Individual Awards

- 2018-2019 Best outside hitter MEVZA League
