= Maret Grothues =

Dutch volleyball player (born 1988)

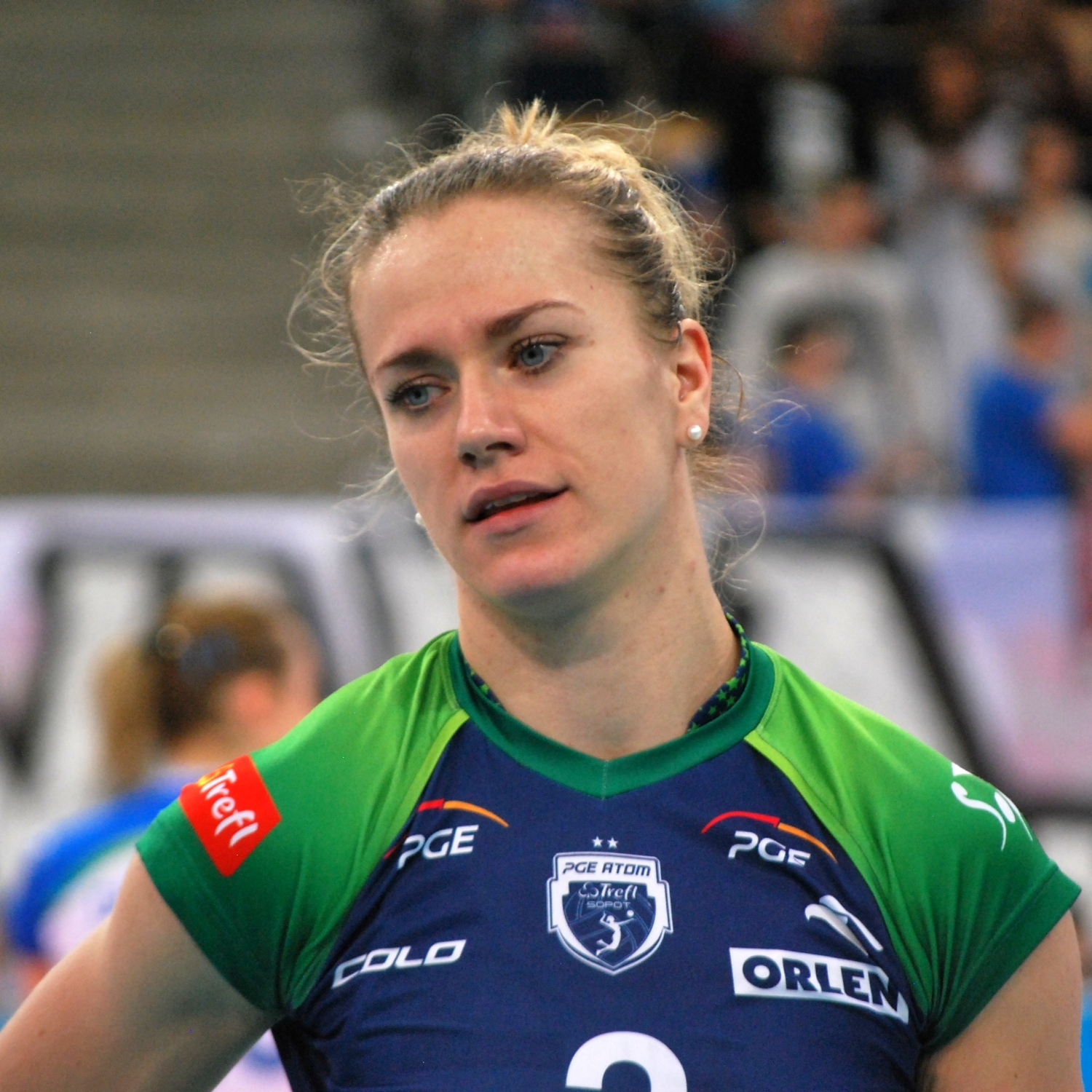
- Grothues in 2016

Personal information
- Full name: Maret Balkestein-Grothues
- Nationality: Dutch
- Born: 16 September 1988 (age 38); Almelo, Netherlands
- Height: 1.80 m (5 ft 11 in)
- Weight: 68 kg (150 lb)
- Spike: 304 cm (120 in)
- Block: 286 cm (113 in)

Volleyball information
- Position: Outside hitter
- Current club: Panathinaikos
- Number: 6

Career
Years	Teams
1996–2004; 2004–2006; 2006–2008; 2009–2011; 2011–2012; 2012; 2012–2013; 2013–2015; 2015–2016; 2016–2017; 2017–2017; 2018; 2018–2019; 2019–2021; 2021–2026	(Netherlands) Krekkers (Netherlands) VV Pollux (Netherlands) Longa '59 Lichtenvoorde (Netherlands) TVC Amstelveen (Italy) Parma Volley (Italy) Cuatto Giaveno Volley (Azerbaijan) Lokomotiv Baku (France) RC Cannes (Poland) Atom Trefl Sopot (Turkey) Fenerbahçe (Poland) Chemik Police (Italy) Volleyball Casalmaggiore (Romania) CSM București (Turkey) Aydın Büyükşehir Belediye (Greece) Panathinaikos

National team
Netherlands
Honours
Women's volleyball
Representing the Netherlands
World Grand Prix
Bronze medal – third place	2016 Bangkok
European Championship
Silver medal – second place	2009 Poland
Silver medal – second place	2015 Belgium/Netherlands
Silver medal – second place	2017 Azerbaijan/Georgia

Maret Balkestein-Grothues (Dutch: [ˈmaːrəd ˈbɑlkəstɛiŋ ˈɣroːtɦys]; née Grothues; born 16 September 1988) is a Dutch volleyball player who plays as an outside hitter. She is a member of the Netherlands women's national volleyball team, and is the current team captain. On 6 May 2021 she signed for the Greek powerhouse Panathinaikos.

Grothues started playing volleyball with the Dutch club Krekkers in 1996, inspired by the male national team winning the Olympic gold in Atlanta 1996. She made her international debut in the Dutch national team at the opening match of the Montreux Volley Masters against Cuba in June 2008. Grothues did not play in the national team in 2014, due to an Achilles heel injury. At the 2010 World Championship she won the "best server" trophy. She played at the European Championships in 2012, 2013 and 2014. In 2015, she was promoted to team captain prior to the 2015 European Games in Baku, Azerbaijan. As of 2016 she has 244 caps.

During the 2016 Summer Olympics, where the Dutch women made their Olympic return after 20 years, Balkestein-Grothues injured her ankle during the second game of the group stage. Thus she only returned for the knockout rounds, seeing limited minutes as the Netherlands finished fourth.

== Awards ==
=== Individuals ===
- 2010 FIVB World Championship "Best Server"
- 2021–22 Greek Volleyball League MVP

=== Clubs ===
- 2008–09 Dutch Volleyball League Champion, with DELA/Martinus Amstelveen
- 2008–09 Dutch Volleyball Cup Winner, with DELA/Martinus Amstelveen
- 2009–10 Dutch Volleyball League Champion, with TVC Amstelveen
- 2009–10 Dutch Volleyball Cup Winner, with TVC Amstelveen
- 2013–14 French Volleyball League Champion, with RC Cannes
- 2013–14 French Volleyball Cup Winner, with RC Cannes
- 2014–15 French Volleyball League Champion, with RC Cannes
- 2016–17 Turkish Volleyball League Champion, with Fenerbahçe
- 2016–17 Turkish Volleyball Cup Winner, with Fenerbahçe
- 2021–22 Greek Volleyball League Champion, with Panathinaikos
- 2021–22 Greek Volleyball Cup Winner, with Panathinaikos
- 2022–23 Greek Volleyball League Champion, with Panathinaikos
- 2023–24 Greek Volleyball League Champion, with Panathinaikos

== Personal life ==
Maret Grothues married the Dutch hockey player Marcel Balkestein on 5 July 2014, becoming Maret Balkestein-Grothues following Dutch convention.
