= Dutch Women's Volleyball Cup =

Volleyball in the Netherlands

- Sport: Volleyball
- Founded: 1974
- Administrator: NeVoBo
- Country: Netherlands
- Continent: Europe
- Most recent champion: Sliedrecht Sport (6th titles)
- Most titles: VC Sneek (7 titles)
- Website: https://www.nevobo.nl/

The Dutch Women's Volleyball Cup is the top annual women's volleyball cup competition in the Netherlands Started in 1974, Ruled and managed by the Dutch Volleyball Association (NeVoBo), it is contested by clubs from all Divisions first second and third tier. The advantages was given to clubs from the 1st tier to advance automatically to the 8 round playoffs.

== Winners list ==
Years	Winners	Score	Runners-up
1974	Van Houten/VCH		
1975	Van Houten/VCH		
1976	Van Houten/VCH		
1977	Van Houten/VCH		
1978	Van Houten/VCH		
1979	Starlift Voorburg		
1980	Prins/DVC Dokkum		
1981	Prins/DVC Dokkum		
1982	Starlift Voorburg		
1983	FBTO/DVC Dokkum		
1984	Ubbink/Orion		
1985	AMVJ Amstelveen		
1986	Tromp/Olympus		
1987	Avéro/Olympus Sneek		
1988	Avéro/OS	3 – 0 (?)	Longa'59 Lichtenvoorde
1989	Avéro/OS		
1990	Martinus Amstelveen		
1991	Martinus Amstelveen		
1992	Avéro/OS		
1993	VVC Vught		Etiflex/Ommen
1994	VVC Vught		
1995	AMVJ Amstelveen	3 – 0 (15-13, 15-1, 15-9)	VVC Vught
1996	VVC Vught		
1997	VVC Vught		
1998	ARKE/Pollux Oldenzaal		
1999	Pelgrim/Volco	3 – 1 (?)	VVC Vught
2000	Facopa VC Weert	3 – 2 (21-25, 21-25, 25-13, 25-23, 17-15)	ARKE/Pollux Oldenzaal
2001	ARKE/Pollux Oldenzaal		Sliedrecht Sport
2002	Longa'59 Lichtenvoorde	3 – 0 (25-23, 25-17, 25-23)	ARKE/Pollux Oldenzaal
2003	ARKE/Pollux Oldenzaal	3 – 0 (?)	Longa'59 Lichtenvoorde
2004	Longa'59 Lichtenvoorde	3 – 0 (25-18, 25-20, 25-11)	ARKE/Pollux Oldenzaal
2005	Longa'59 Lichtenvoorde		
2006	HCCnet / Martinus	3 – 1 (?)	Plantina Longa
2007	DELA/Martinus Amstelveen	3 – 1 (24-26, 25-21, 25-21, 25-21)	Plantina Longa
2008	DELA/Martinus Amstelveen	3 – 0 (26-24, 25-8, 25-22)	Sliedrecht Sport
2009	DELA/Martinus Amstelveen	3 – 1 (25-22, 25-17, 23-25, 25-18)	Dros/Alterno
2010	TVC Amstelveen	3 – 0 (25-16, 25-17, 25-19)	Dros/Alterno
2011	Irmato VC Weert	3 – 0 (25-22, 25-10, 25-14)	VC Sneek
2012	Sliedrecht Sport	3 – 0 (25-23, 25-19, 26-24)	Irmato VC Weert
2013	Alterno Apeldoorn	3 – 2 (21-25, 25-12, 17-25, 25-15, 15-10)	Eurosped
2014	VC Sneek	3 – 1 (19-25, 28-26, 25-20, 28-26)	Peelpush
2015	Sliedrecht Sport	3 – 2 (22-25, 20-25, 29-27, 25-20, 16-14)	VC Sneek
2016	Eurosped TVT	3 – 1 (16-25, 25-19, 25-17, 25-19)	VV Set-Up'65
2017	VC Sneek	3 – 1 (30-28, 22-25, 25-13, 25-23)	Sliedrecht Sport
2018	Sliedrecht Sport	3 – 0 (25-21, 25-20, 25-16)	Eurosped TVT
2019	Sliedrecht Sport	3 – 0 (25-16, 25-23, 25-16)	VV Apollo 8
2020	Sliedrecht Sport	3 – 0 (25-14, 33-31, 25-14)	Laudame Financials/VCN
2021	VV Apollo 8	3 – 1 (27-25, 25-13, 16-25, 25-19)	Laudame Financials/VCN
2022	Sliedrecht Sport	3 – 1 (26-24, 25-27, 25-19, 25-17)	VV Utrecht
