= Vladimir Kuzyutkin =

Soviet and Russian volleyball coach (1947–2022)

- Kuzyutkin in 2012

Personal information
- Nationality: Russian
- Born: 20 February 1947 Petropavlovsk-Kamchatsky, Kamchatka Oblast, Russian SFSR, USSR
- Died: 10 June 2022 (aged 75) Moscow, Russia

Volleyball information
- Position: Head coach
Honours
Coach for Women's volleyball
Representing Russia
World Championship
| Gold medal – first place | 2010 Japan |

Vladimir Ivanovich Kuzyutkin (Russian: Владимир Иванович Кузюткин; 20 February 1947 – 10 June 2022) was a Soviet and Russian volleyball coach, who from 2009 to 2011 worked as head coach of the Russia women's national volleyball team and helped his team to win the 2010 World Cup. In 2011 he was named an Honored Coach of Russia. From February to November 2014 he coached the Bulgaria women's national volleyball team.

On 2 February 2017, Kuzyutkin returned as head coach for the Russian women's national team.

== Honours ==
=== Сlubs ===
Emlak Bankası

- Turkish Women's Volleyball League: 1989/90, 1990/91

Eczacıbaşı VitrA

- Turkish Women's Volleyball League: 1993/94, 1994/95

=== Russian team ===
- 2010 FIVB Volleyball Women's World Championship: 2010
