= Dutch Volleyball League =

Dutch Eredivisie Volleyball League
- Current season, competition or edition: 2023–24 Dutch Eredivisie Volleyball League
- Sport: Volleyball
- Founded: 1948
- First season: 1948
- Administrator: Nevobo
- No. of teams: 10
- Country: Netherlands
- Continent: Europe
- Level on pyramid: 1
- Relegation to: 2nd League
- Domestic cups: Dutch Cup; Dutch Super Cup
- International cups: CEV Champions League; CEV Cup; CEV Challenge Cup
- Website: volleybal.nl

The Dutch Men's Volleyball Eredivisie is a men's volleyball competition organized by the Dutch Volleyball Association (Nevobo), it was created in 1948.

== Teams ==
As of the 2025/2026 season :

- Dynamo Apeldoorn
- Abiant Lycurgus Groningen
- Active Living Orion
- Numidia VC Limax
- Sliedrecht Sport
- Advisie/SSS
- ZVH Volleybal
- VV Huizen

== Winners list ==
- 1948 : AMVJ Amstelveen
- 1949 : RVC Rotterdam
- 1950 : RVC Rotterdam
- 1951 : RVC Rotterdam
- 1952 : RVC Rotterdam
- 1953 : RVC Rotterdam
- 1954 : RVC Rotterdam
- 1955 : RVC Rotterdam
- 1956 : RVC Rotterdam
- 1957 : RVC Rotterdam
- 1958 : RVC Rotterdam
- 1959 : DES Voorburg
- 1960 : REVA Gorredijk
- 1961 : DES Voorburg
- 1962 : REVA Gorredijk
- 1963 : AMVJ Amstelveen
- 1964 : DES Voorburg
- 1965 : Blokkeer VC
- 1966 : Blokkeer VC
- 1967 : Blokkeer VC
- 1968 : Blokkeer VC
- 1969 : AMVJ Amstelveen
- 1970 : AMVJ Amstelveen
- 1971 : AMVJ Amstelveen
- 1972 : AMVJ Amstelveen
- 1973 : AMVJ Amstelveen
- 1974 : Blokkeer
- 1975 : SV Gaggenau
- 1976 : Starlift Voorburg
- 1977 : Starlift Voorburg
- 1978 : Starlift Voorburg
- 1979 : Starlift Voorburg
- 1980 : AMVJ Amstelveen
- 1981 : VVC Vught
- 1982 : Starlift Voorburg
- 1983 : Starlift Voorburg
- 1984 : Martinus Amstelveen
- 1985 : Martinus Amstelveen
- 1986 : Martinus Amstelveen
- 1987 : Martinus Amstelveen
- 1988 : Martinus Amstelveen
- 1989 : AMVJ Amstelveen
- 1990 : ZVH Zevenhuizen
- 1991 : Piet Zoomers Apeldoorn
- 1992 : ZVH Zevenhuizen
- 1993 : Piet Zoomers Apeldoorn
- 1994 : Piet Zoomers Apeldoorn
- 1995 : Piet Zoomers Apeldoorn
- 1996 : Piet Zoomers Apeldoorn
- 1997 : Piet Zoomers Apeldoorn
- 1998 : Ortec Nesselande Rotterdam
- 1999 : Piet Zoomers Apeldoorn
- 2000 : Vrevok Nieuwegein
- 2001 : Piet Zoomers Apeldoorn
- 2002 : AMVJ Amstelveen
- 2003 : Piet Zoomers Apeldoorn
- 2004 : Ortec Nesselande Rotterdam
- 2005 : Ortec Nesselande Rotterdam
- 2006 : Ortec Nesselande Rotterdam
- 2007 : Piet Zoomers Apeldoorn
- 2008 : Piet Zoomers Apeldoorn
- 2009 : VC Nesselande Rotterdam
- 2010 : Dynamo Apeldoorn
- 2011 : VC Rivium Rotterdam
- 2012 : Langhenkel Orion
- 2013 : Landstede Volleybal
- 2014 : Landstede Volleybal
- 2015 : Landstede Volleybal
- 2016 : Abiant Lycurgus Groningen
- 2017 : Abiant Lycurgus Groningen
- 2018 : Abiant Lycurgus Groningen
- 2019 : Active Living Orion
- 2020: ~~Not Finished~~
- 2021: Dynamo Apeldoorn
- 2022 : Dynamo Apeldoorn
- 2023 : Dynamo Apeldoorn
- 2024 : Active Living Orion
