= Teun Buijs =

Dutch volleyball player (born 1960)

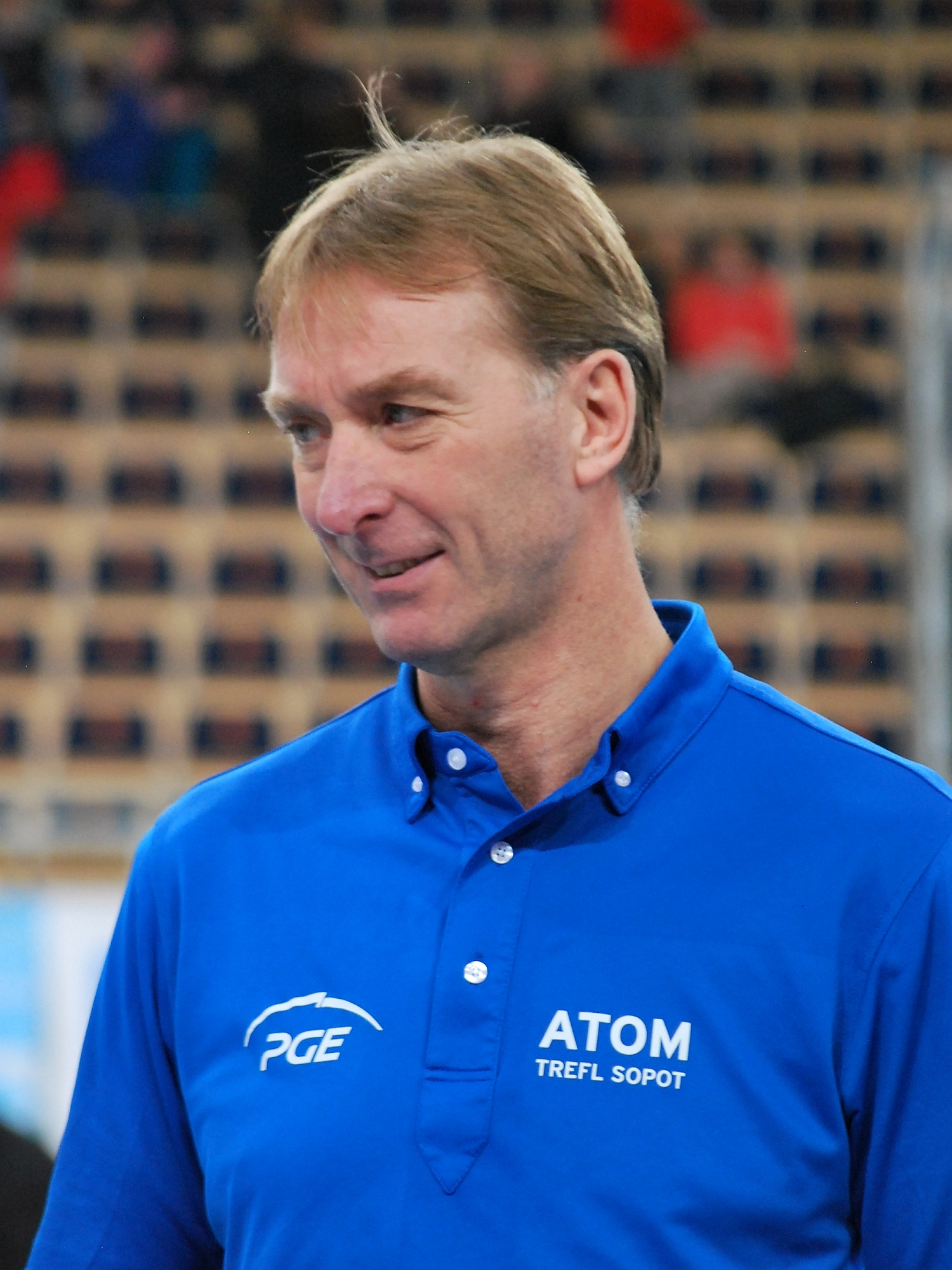
- Teun Buijs in 2013

Personal information
- Nationality: Dutch
- Born: 24 February 1960 (age 65); Oostzaan, Netherlands

Sport
- Sport: Volleyball

Teunis Buijs (born 24 February 1960) is a Dutch ex-volleyball player and coach. He competed in the men's tournament at the 1988 Summer Olympics. He is the father of the dutch volleyball player, Anne Buijs, who has been in the Netherlands Women's National Team since 2008. In 2022, he became the head coach of Prima Donna Kaas Huizen, located in Huizen, Netherlands.

Buijs played as Middle Blocker and started his professional career in 1978, and after playing for only dutch volleyball Clubs, finished acting as a player in 1992.

After that he became coach of several european clubs. During 1996 up until 2008 he worked as coach assistant in the Netherlands Women's National Team.
