= Sportvereniging Dynamo =

Dutch volleyball club

Draisma Dynamo Apeldoorn
- Short name: Dynamo
- Founded: 1967
- Chairman: Peter de Vries
- Manager: Redbad Strikwerda
- League: Dutch Eredivisie
- 2022–23: Champions
- Website: draismadynamo.nl

SV Dynamo or simply Dynamo, is a Dutch professional volleyball club based in Apeldoorn. They compete in the Dutch Eredivisie.

== Team ==
- Current Roster (2023/24 season)

No.	Name	Date of birth	Position
3	(Netherlands) Gijs Van Solkema	21 May 1998 (age 26)	setter
19	(Netherlands) Freek De Weijer	30 October 1995 (age 29)	setter
7	(United Kingdom) Jack Williams	10 November 1999 (age 25)	opposite
8	(Netherlands) Yannick Bak	30 January 2001 (age 24)	outside hitter
9	(Netherlands) Cas Abraham	17 May 1999 (age 25)	outside hitter
22	(Netherlands) Erik Van der Schaaf	12 December 1993 (age 31)	outside hitter
23	(Netherlands) Tijmen Laane	2 February 1988 (age 37)	outside hitter
5	(Netherlands) Sjors Tijhuis	31 December 2000 (age 24)	middle blocker
10	(Netherlands) Maikel Van Zeist	16 September 1994 (age 30)	middle blocker
15	(Netherlands) Jelle Bosma	8 March 2003 (age 22)	middle blocker
18	(Netherlands) Duco Krook	18 January 1996 (age 29)	middle blocker
6	(Sweden) Edvin Svärd	29 March 1999 (age 25)	libero
20	(Netherlands) Niels Lipke	20 December 2002 (age 22)	libero
24	(Netherlands) Jordi Van Andel	7 October 1999 (age 25)	libero
Head coach:		(Netherlands) Redbad Strikwerda	

== Honours ==
=== Domestic ===
- Dutch Eredivisie

Winners (15): 1990–91, 1992–93, 1993–94, 1994–95, 1995–96, 1996–97, 1998–99, 2000–01, 2002–03, 2006–07, 2007–08, 2009–10, 2020–21, 2021–22, 2022–23

- Dutch Cup

Winners (10): 1992–93, 1993–94, 1995–96, 1999–2000, 2001–02, 2007–08, 2008–09, 2009–10, 2010–11, 2018–19

- Dutch SuperCup

Winners (9): 1993–94, 1995–96, 1996–97, 2000–01, 2001–02, 2007–08, 2008–09, 2010–11, 2021–22

=== International ===
- CEV Cup

Winners (1): 2002–03
