= Sliedrecht Sport =

Dutch volleyball club

- Full name: Sliedrecht Sport
- Founded: 1956
- Ground: Sporthal De Basis, Sliedrecht, Netherlands
- League: Eredivisie Dames (women's); Dutch Eredivisie (men's)
- Website: Club home page

Sliedrecht Sport is a Dutch volleyball club based in Sliedrecht. It has professional and amateur teams (men, women, youth and beach volleyball) with the women's team being the most successful, having won the national league, cup and supercup multiple times, and currently playing in the Eredivisie Dames, the highest level in the Netherlands. The men's team was promoted to the Dutch Eredivisie for the first time in 2018.

== History ==
Founded in 1956, the club has over 600 athletes within its various teams (men, women, youth and beach volley).

The most successful team is the women's, which won the Dutch league four times, the Dutch Cup three times and the Dutch Supercup also on three occasions. Since 2001 the club has regularly featured in European competitions, such as the Women's CEV Cup and the CEV Women's Challenge Cup.

The men's team played in the Topdivisie (2nd tier) until it was promoted to the Eredivisie Heren for the first time in 2018.

The youth teams were also awarded best team in 2003, 2005, 2016 and 2017

== Teams ==
=== Men's ===
- Current Roster (2023/24 season)

== Honours ==
=== National competitions ===
Women

- Eredivisie: 4

2011–12, 2012–13, 2016–17, 2017–18

- Dutch Cup: 3

2011–12, 2014–15, 2017–18

- Dutch Supercup: 3

2013, 2017, 2018
