= 2010 FIVB Women's Volleyball World Championship qualification (CAVB) =

The CAVB qualification for the 2010 FIVB Women's Volleyball World Championship saw member nations compete for two places at the finals in Japan.

== Draw ==
14 of the 53 CAVB national teams entered qualification. (DR Congo later withdrew) The teams were distributed according to their position in the FIVB Senior Women's Rankings as of 5 January 2008 using the serpentine system for their distribution. (Rankings shown in brackets) Teams ranked 1–4 did not compete in the second round, and automatically qualified for the third round.

Second round

Pool A (North)	Pool B (South)
Cameroon (26); Senegal (32); Botswana (41); Nigeria (53); ~~DR Congo (74)~~	Zimbabwe (—); Mozambique (—); Eswatini (—); Mauritius (74); South Africa (40)

Third round

Pool C	Pool D
Kenya (12); Tunisia (23); 1st Pool A 2nd Pool A	Egypt (20); Algeria (21); 1st Pool B 2nd Pool B

== Second round ==
=== Pool A ===
- Venue: Sir Molade Okoya-Thomas Hall, Lagos, Nigeria
- Dates: June 3–7, 2009
- All times are West Africa Time (UTC+01:00)

Pos	Team	Pld	W	L	Pts	SW	SL	SR	SPW	SPL	SPR
1	Cameroon	3	3	0	6	9	1	9.000	246	187	1.316
2	Senegal	3	2	1	5	6	3	2.000	205	190	1.079
3	Nigeria	3	1	2	4	4	8	0.500	241	257	0.938
4	Botswana	3	0	3	3	2	9	0.222	199	257	0.774

Date	Time		Score		Set 1	Set 2	Set 3	Set 4	Set 5	Total	Report
03 Jun	19:00	Botswana	0–3	Senegal	14–25	23–25	18–25			55–75	P2 P3
04 Jun	19:00	Nigeria	3–2	Botswana	25–13	20–25	25–14	22–25	15–9	107–86	P2 P3
05 Jun	17:00	Botswana	0–3	Cameroon	14–25	22–25	22–25			58–75	P2 P3
05 Jun	19:00	Senegal	3–0	Nigeria	25–22	25–20	25–18			75–60	P2 P3
06 Jun	17:00	Cameroon	3–0	Senegal	25–21	25–14	25–20			75–55	P2 P3
07 Jun	19:00	Nigeria	1–3	Cameroon	25–21	20–25	15–25	14–25		74–96	P2 P3

=== Pool B ===
- Venue: Maxaquene, Maputo, Mozambique
- Dates: May 20–24, 2009
- All times are Central Africa Time (UTC+02:00)

Pos	Team	Pld	W	L	Pts	SW	SL	SR	SPW	SPL	SPR
1	Mauritius	4	4	0	8	12	2	6.000	346	226	1.531
2	South Africa	4	3	1	7	10	3	3.333	311	239	1.301
3	Mozambique	4	2	2	6	7	6	1.167	290	262	1.107
4	Eswatini	4	1	3	5	3	9	0.333	194	278	0.698
5	Zimbabwe	4	0	4	4	0	12	0.000	164	300	0.547

Date	Time		Score		Set 1	Set 2	Set 3	Set 4	Set 5	Total	Report
20 May	15:00	Zimbabwe	0–3	South Africa	15–25	7–25	10–25			32–75	P2 P3
20 May	17:00	Eswatini	0–3	Mauritius	9–25	14–25	5–25			28–75	P2 P3
21 May	15:00	Mauritius	3–1	South Africa	22–25	25–21	25–15	25–21		97–82	P2 P3
21 May	17:00	Eswatini	0–3	Mozambique	12–25	16–25	11–25			39–75	P2 P3
22 May	15:00	South Africa	3–0	Eswatini	26–24	25–16	25–12			76–52	P2 P3
22 May	17:00	Mozambique	3–0	Zimbabwe	25–15	25–10	25–21			75–46	P2 P3
23 May	14:00	Zimbabwe	0–3	Eswatini	15–25	17–25	20–25			52–75	P2 P3
23 May	16:00	Mozambique	1–3	Mauritius	16–25	26–24	22–25	18–25		82–99	P2 P3
24 May	14:00	Mauritius	3–0	Zimbabwe	25–9	25–18	25–7			75–34	P2 P3
24 May	16:00	South Africa	3–0	Mozambique	25–15	28–26	25–17			78–58	P2 P3

== Third round ==
=== Pool C ===
- Venue: Kasarani Hall, Nairobi, Kenya
- Dates: July 10–12, 2009
- All times are East Africa Time (UTC+03:00)

Pos	Team	Pld	W	L	Pts	SW	SL	SR	SPW	SPL	SPR
1	Kenya	3	3	0	6	9	0	MAX	225	161	1.398
2	Tunisia	3	2	1	5	6	5	1.200	231	235	0.983
3	Senegal	3	1	2	4	3	8	0.375	214	255	0.839
4	Cameroon	3	0	3	3	4	9	0.444	268	287	0.934

Date	Time		Score		Set 1	Set 2	Set 3	Set 4	Set 5	Total	Report
10 Jul	14:00	Tunisia	3–2	Cameroon	27–25	18–25	25–18	18–25	16–14	104–107	P2 P3
10 Jul	16:00	Kenya	3–0	Senegal	25–19	25–20	25–14			75–53	P2 P3
11 Jul	14:00	Senegal	3–2	Cameroon	21–25	25–22	25–20	22–25	15–13	108–105	P2 P3
11 Jul	16:00	Kenya	3–0	Tunisia	25–18	25–18	25–16			75–52	P2 P3
12 Jul	14:00	Tunisia	3–0	Senegal	25–19	25–17	25–17			75–53	P2 P3
12 Jul	16:00	Cameroon	0–3	Kenya	16–25	21–25	19–25			56–75	P2 P3

=== Pool D ===
- Venue: OPOW Grande Salle, Batna, Algeria
- Dates: July 22–24, 2009
- All times are Central European Time (UTC+01:00)

Pos	Team	Pld	W	L	Pts	SW	SL	SR	SPW	SPL	SPR
1	Algeria	3	3	0	6	9	1	9.000	245	145	1.690
2	Egypt	3	2	1	5	7	4	1.750	245	212	1.156
3	Mauritius	3	1	2	4	3	6	0.500	158	205	0.771
4	South Africa	3	0	3	3	1	9	0.111	161	247	0.652

Date	Time		Score		Set 1	Set 2	Set 3	Set 4	Set 5	Total	Report
22 Jul	16:00	Egypt	3–0	Mauritius	25–19	25–14	25–20			75–53	P2 P3
22 Jul	18:00	Algeria	3–0	South Africa	25–13	25–7	25–22			75–42	P2 P3
23 Jul	16:00	South Africa	0–3	Mauritius	21–25	18–25	16–25			55–75	P2 P3
23 Jul	18:00	Algeria	3–1	Egypt	25–18	20–25	25–10	25–20		95–73	P2 P3
24 Jul	16:00	Egypt	3–1	South Africa	25–15	22–25	25–10	25–14		97–64	P2 P3
24 Jul	18:00	Mauritius	0–3	Algeria	12–25	10–25	8–25			30–75	P2 P3
