= 2010 FIVB Women's Volleyball World Championship qualification (CSV) =

The CSV qualification for the 2010 FIVB Women's Volleyball World Championship saw member nations compete for two places at the finals in Japan.

== Draw ==
8 of the 12 CSV national teams entered qualification. The teams were distributed according to their position in the FIVB Senior Women's Rankings as of 5 January 2008 using the serpentine system for their distribution. (Rankings shown in brackets) Teams ranked 1–2 did not compete in the second round, and automatically qualified for the third round.

Second round

Pool A

Venezuela (29)
Uruguay (28)
Argentina (31)
Colombia (39)
Chile (70)
Bolivia (98)

Third round

Pool B

Brazil (1)
Peru (13)
1st Pool A
2nd Pool A

== Second round ==
=== Pool A ===
- Venue: Centro Cultural y Deportivo, Buenos Aires, Argentina
- Dates: May 31 – June 4, 2009
- All times are Argentina Time (UTC−03:00)

Pos	Team	Pld	W	L	Pts	SW	SL	SR	SPW	SPL	SPR
1	Argentina	5	5	0	10	15	0	MAX	379	220	1.723
2	Venezuela	5	4	1	9	12	5	2.400	394	334	1.180
3	Colombia	5	3	2	8	10	8	1.250	386	365	1.058
4	Uruguay	5	2	3	7	9	10	0.900	407	385	1.057
5	Chile	5	1	4	6	3	12	0.250	268	354	0.757
6	Bolivia	5	0	5	5	1	15	0.067	223	399	0.559

Date	Time		Score		Set 1	Set 2	Set 3	Set 4	Set 5	Total	Report
31 May	14:45	Uruguay	3–0	Chile	25–14	25–20	25–11			75–45	P2 P3
31 May	18:30	Argentina	3–0	Bolivia	25–6	25–9	25–8			75–23	P2 P3
31 May	21:00	Venezuela	3–1	Colombia	25–22	19–25	25–19	25–18		94–84	P2 P3
01 Jun	14:45	Venezuela	3–0	Chile	25–21	25–14	25–21			75–56	P2 P3
01 Jun	17:45	Bolivia	1–3	Uruguay	13–25	8–25	26–24	15–25		62–99	P2 P3
01 Jun	20:30	Argentina	3–0	Colombia	25–18	25–19	25–11			75–48	P2 P3
02 Jun	14:45	Venezuela	3–1	Uruguay	20–25	25–15	25–19	25–22		95–81	P2 P3
02 Jun	18:15	Colombia	3–0	Bolivia	25–10	25–13	25–23			75–46	P2 P3
02 Jun	20:30	Argentina	3–0	Chile	25–13	25–17	25–12			75–42	P2 P3
03 Jun	14:45	Venezuela	3–0	Bolivia	25–20	25–8	25–10			75–38	P2 P3
03 Jun	17:45	Colombia	3–0	Chile	25–15	25–21	25–14			75–50	P2 P3
03 Jun	20:30	Argentina	3–0	Uruguay	29–27	25–15	25–10			79–52	P2 P3
04 Jun	14:45	Chile	3–0	Bolivia	25–12	25–19	25–23			75–54	P2 P3
04 Jun	18:15	Colombia	3–2	Uruguay	20–25	25–18	19–25	25–23	15–9	104–100	P2 P3
04 Jun	20:30	Argentina	3–0	Venezuela	25–20	25–15	25–20			75–55	P2 P3

== Third round ==
=== Pool B ===
- Venue: Ginásio Poliesportivo do Riacho, Contagem and Divino Braga, Betim, Brazil
- Dates: July 22–26, 2009
- All times are Brasília time (UTC−03:00)

==== Preliminary round ====
Pos	Team	Pld	W	L	Pts	SW	SL	SR	SPW	SPL	SPR
1	Brazil	3	3	0	6	9	1	9.000	245	165	1.485
2	Peru	3	2	1	5	6	6	1.000	251	248	1.012
3	Argentina	3	1	2	4	6	7	0.857	255	276	0.924
4	Venezuela	3	0	3	3	2	9	0.222	197	259	0.761

Date	Time		Score		Set 1	Set 2	Set 3	Set 4	Set 5	Total	Report
22 Jul	16:00	Argentina	2–3	Peru	25–16	19–25	22–25	25–20	12–15	103–101	P2 P3
22 Jul	19:00	Brazil	3–0	Venezuela	25–14	25–16	25–17			75–47	P2 P3
23 Jul	16:00	Peru	3–1	Venezuela	18–25	25–17	25–11	25–17		93–70	P2 P3
23 Jul	19:00	Brazil	3–1	Argentina	20–25	25–9	25–16	25–11		95–61	P2 P3
24 Jul	14:00	Argentina	3–1	Venezuela	25–16	27–25	14–25	25–14		91–80	P2 P3
24 Jul	17:00	Brazil	3–0	Peru	25–14	25–23	25–20			75–57	P2 P3

==== Final round ====
===== Semifinals =====
Date	Time		Score		Set 1	Set 2	Set 3	Set 4	Set 5	Total	Report
25 Jul	09:30	Brazil	3–0	Venezuela	25–11	25–9	25–10			75–30	P2 P3
25 Jul	11:30	Peru	3–0	Argentina	25–17	25–22	25–19			75–58	P2 P3

===== 3rd place =====
Date	Time		Score		Set 1	Set 2	Set 3	Set 4	Set 5	Total	Report
26 Jul	11:30	Venezuela	3–1	Argentina	25–23	16–25	25–22	25–21		91–91	P2 P3

===== Final =====
Date	Time		Score		Set 1	Set 2	Set 3	Set 4	Set 5	Total	Report
26 Jul	09:30	Brazil	3–0	Peru	25–14	25–12	25–12			75–38	P2 P3

==== Final standing ====
Rank	Team
1	Brazil
2	Peru
3	Venezuela
4	Argentina
