= Olga Fateeva =

Russian volleyball player (born 1984)

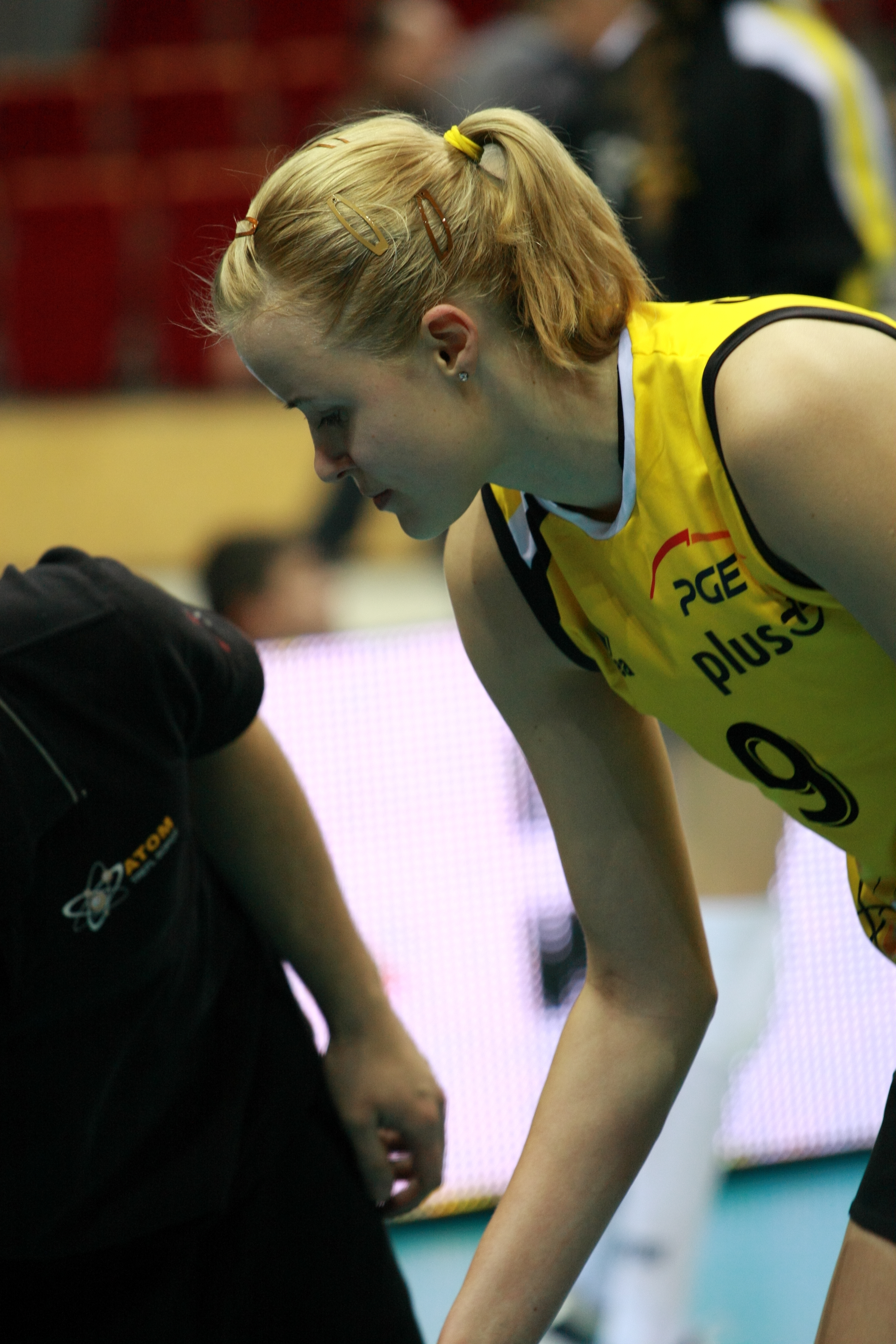

Personal information
- Full name: Olga Fateeva
- Nationality: Russia
- Born: 4 May 1984 (age 42); Soviet Union, Pavlohrad
- Height: 1.90 m (6 ft 3 in)
- Weight: 72 kg (159 lb)

Volleyball information
- Current club: Sirio Perugia

National team
| 2003 - 2012 | Russia |
Honours
Women's volleyball
Representing Russia
World Championship
| Gold medal – first place | 2010 Japan | Team |
FIVB World Grand Prix
| Silver medal – second place | 2003 Andria | Team |
European Championship
| Bronze medal – third place | 2005 Zagreb-Pula | Team |
| Bronze medal – third place | 2007 Belgium/Lux. | Team |

Olga Fateeva (Russian: Ольга Фатеева; born 4 May 1984) is a Russian volleyball player. She was a member of the national team that won the gold medal at the 2010 World Championship.
