= 2010 FIVB Women's Volleyball World Championship qualification (CEV) =

The CEV qualification for the 2010 FIVB Women's Volleyball World Championship saw member nations compete for eight places at the finals in Japan.

== Draw ==
33 of the 55 CEV national teams entered qualification. (Iceland later withdrew) The teams were distributed according to their position in the FIVB Senior Women's Rankings as of 5 January 2008 using the serpentine system for their distribution. (Rankings shown in brackets) Teams ranked 1–6 did not compete in the first and second rounds, and automatically qualified for the third round. Teams ranked 7–20 did not compete in the first round, and automatically qualified for the second round.

First round

Pool A	Pool B	Pool C
Slovenia (54); Austria (74); Hungary (—); Bosnia and Herzegovina (84); Montenegro (—)	Great Britain (74); Portugal (84); Israel (—); ~~Iceland (—)~~	Denmark (—); Estonia (—); Georgia (—); Moldova (—)

- Iceland withdrew and Montenegro replaced Iceland in Pool B to balance the number of teams in each group.

Second round

Pool D	Pool E	Pool F	Pool G
Azerbaijan (26); Ukraine (43); Belarus (44); 1st Pool B	Belgium (33); Slovakia (41); Croatia (44); 1st Pool A	Bulgaria (34); Czech Republic (38); Romania (48); Albania (54); 1st Pool C	France (35); Greece (36); Spain (44); Finland (54); 2nd Pool A

Third round

Pool H	Pool I	Pool J	Pool K
Italy (2); 1st Pool F 1st Pool D 2nd Pool F	Serbia (7); 1st Pool G 1st Pool E 3rd Pool F	Poland (9); Turkey (22); 2nd Pool E 2nd Pool G	Netherlands (10); Germany (15); 2nd Pool D 3rd Pool G

== First round ==
=== Pool A ===
- Venue: Sport Hall Lendava, Lendava, Slovenia
- Dates: January 9–11, 2009
- All times are Central European Time (UTC+01:00)

Pos	Team	Pld	W	L	Pts	SW	SL	SR	SPW	SPL	SPR
1	Hungary	3	3	0	6	9	2	4.500	265	201	1.318
2	Slovenia	3	2	1	5	7	3	2.333	233	199	1.171
3	Bosnia and Herzegovina	3	1	2	4	3	6	0.500	183	210	0.871
4	Austria	3	0	3	3	1	9	0.111	175	246	0.711

Date	Time		Score		Set 1	Set 2	Set 3	Set 4	Set 5	Total	Report
09 Jan	16:00	Austria	1–3	Hungary	12–25	25–19	10–25	15–25		62–94	P2 P3
09 Jan	19:00	Slovenia	3–0	Bosnia and Herzegovina	25–22	25–15	25–13			75–50	P2 P3
10 Jan	16:00	Bosnia and Herzegovina	0–3	Hungary	17–25	19–25	20–25			56–75	P2 P3
10 Jan	19:00	Slovenia	3–0	Austria	25–20	25–15	25–18			75–53	P2 P3
11 Jan	16:00	Austria	0–3	Bosnia and Herzegovina	16–25	19–25	25–27			60–77	P2 P3
11 Jan	19:00	Hungary	3–1	Slovenia	25–22	21–25	25–17	25–19		96–83	P2 P3

=== Pool B ===
- Venue: English Institute of Sport, Sheffield, United Kingdom
- Dates: January 2–4, 2009
- All times are Greenwich Mean Time (UTC±00:00)

Pos	Team	Pld	W	L	Pts	SW	SL	SR	SPW	SPL	SPR
1	Israel	3	3	0	6	9	0	MAX	228	158	1.443
2	Portugal	3	2	1	5	6	5	1.200	248	233	1.064
3	Great Britain	3	1	2	4	5	7	0.714	257	283	0.908
4	Montenegro	3	0	3	3	1	9	0.111	189	248	0.762

Date	Time		Score		Set 1	Set 2	Set 3	Set 4	Set 5	Total	Report
02 Jan	16:00	Great Britain	2–3	Portugal	25–22	25–27	18–25	27–25	9–15	104–114	P2 P3
02 Jan	18:00	Montenegro	0–3	Israel	18–25	15–25	11–25			44–75	P2 P3
03 Jan	16:00	Great Britain	3–1	Montenegro	26–24	26–24	21–25	25–20		98–93	P2 P3
03 Jan	18:00	Portugal	0–3	Israel	16–25	18–25	25–27			59–77	P2 P3
04 Jan	16:00	Israel	3–0	Great Britain	25–12	26–24	25–19			76–55	P2 P3
04 Jan	18:00	Portugal	3–0	Montenegro	25–18	25–20	25–14			75–52	P2 P3

=== Pool C ===
- Venue: Kalevi Spordihall, Tallinn, Estonia
- Dates: January 9–11, 2009
- All times are Eastern European Time (UTC+02:00)

Pos	Team	Pld	W	L	Pts	SW	SL	SR	SPW	SPL	SPR
1	Moldova	3	3	0	6	9	2	4.500	250	173	1.445
2	Estonia	3	2	1	5	8	3	2.667	243	197	1.234
3	Georgia	3	1	2	4	3	7	0.429	175	231	0.758
4	Denmark	3	0	3	3	1	9	0.111	177	244	0.725

Date	Time		Score		Set 1	Set 2	Set 3	Set 4	Set 5	Total	Report
09 Jan	15:30	Denmark	0–3	Moldova	10–25	20–25	20–25			50–75	P2 P3
09 Jan	18:00	Georgia	0–3	Estonia	17–25	20–25	14–25			51–75	P2 P3
10 Jan	15:00	Georgia	3–1	Denmark	25–18	19–25	25–23	25–15		94–81	P2 P3
10 Jan	17:30	Estonia	2–3	Moldova	22–25	25–14	25–21	9–25	12–15	93–100	P2 P3
11 Jan	15:00	Moldova	3–0	Georgia	25–9	25–8	25–13			75–30	P2 P3
11 Jan	17:30	Denmark	0–3	Estonia	14–25	14–25	18–25			46–75	P2 P3

== Second round ==
=== Pool D ===
- Venue: Olympic and Leisure Complex, Quba, Azerbaijan
- Dates: May 15–17, 2009
- All times are Azerbaijan Summer Time (UTC+05:00)

Pos	Team	Pld	W	L	Pts	SW	SL	SR	SPW	SPL	SPR
1	Belarus	3	3	0	6	9	1	9.000	256	224	1.143
2	Azerbaijan	3	2	1	5	6	4	1.500	242	202	1.198
3	Israel	3	1	2	4	5	7	0.714	247	277	0.892
4	Ukraine	3	0	3	3	1	9	0.111	204	246	0.829

Date	Time		Score		Set 1	Set 2	Set 3	Set 4	Set 5	Total	Report
15 May	16:00	Ukraine	0–3	Belarus	23–25	26–28	22–25			71–78	P2 P3
15 May	18:30	Azerbaijan	3–1	Israel	25–14	21–25	25–20	25–13		96–72	P2 P3
16 May	16:00	Ukraine	1–3	Israel	19–25	19–25	25–17	21–25		84–92	P2 P3
16 May	18:30	Belarus	3–0	Azerbaijan	25–19	25–22	31–29			81–70	P2 P3
17 May	16:00	Israel	1–3	Belarus	25–22	18–25	23–25	17–25		83–97	P2 P3
17 May	18:30	Azerbaijan	3–0	Ukraine	25–16	26–24	25–9			76–49	P2 P3

=== Pool E ===
- Venue: Arena Gripe, Split, Croatia
- Dates: May 15–17, 2009
- All times are Central European Summer Time (UTC+02:00)

Pos	Team	Pld	W	L	Pts	SW	SL	SR	SPW	SPL	SPR
1	Croatia	3	3	0	6	9	0	MAX	230	156	1.474
2	Belgium	3	2	1	5	6	3	2.000	212	194	1.093
3	Slovakia	3	1	2	4	3	6	0.500	189	205	0.922
4	Hungary	3	0	3	3	0	9	0.000	149	225	0.662

Date	Time		Score		Set 1	Set 2	Set 3	Set 4	Set 5	Total	Report
15 May	17:00	Croatia	3–0	Hungary	25–14	25–12	25–12			75–38	P2 P3
15 May	19:30	Belgium	3–0	Slovakia	25–23	25–18	25–17			75–58	P2 P3
16 May	17:00	Croatia	3–0	Slovakia	25–15	25–20	25–21			75–56	P2 P3
16 May	19:30	Belgium	3–0	Hungary	25–16	25–18	25–22			75–56	P2 P3
17 May	18:00	Croatia	3–0	Belgium	25–17	30–28	25–17			80–62	P2 P3
17 May	20:30	Slovakia	3–0	Hungary	25–15	25–20	25–20			75–55	P2 P3

=== Pool F ===
- Venue: Sport Hall Orlovec, Gabrovo, Bulgaria
- Dates: May 13–17, 2009
- All times are Eastern European Summer Time (UTC+03:00)

Pos	Team	Pld	W	L	Pts	SW	SL	SR	SPW	SPL	SPR
1	Bulgaria	4	4	0	8	12	2	6.000	353	275	1.284
2	Czech Republic	4	3	1	7	10	4	2.500	340	276	1.232
3	Romania	4	2	2	6	8	6	1.333	328	277	1.184
4	Albania	4	1	3	5	3	10	0.300	225	318	0.708
5	Moldova	4	0	4	4	1	12	0.083	224	324	0.691

Date	Time		Score		Set 1	Set 2	Set 3	Set 4	Set 5	Total	Report
13 May	16:00	Romania	1–3	Czech Republic	23–25	22–25	25–21	22–25		92–96	P2 P3
13 May	18:30	Bulgaria	3–0	Moldova	25–16	25–22	25–13			75–51	P2 P3
14 May	16:00	Moldova	0–3	Romania	9–25	15–25	15–25			39–75	P2 P3
14 May	18:00	Albania	0–3	Bulgaria	10–25	16–25	18–25			44–75	P2 P3
15 May	16:00	Czech Republic	3–0	Moldova	25–16	25–10	25–15			75–41	P2 P3
15 May	18:00	Romania	3–0	Albania	25–11	25–15	25–15			75–41	P2 P3
16 May	16:00	Albania	0–3	Czech Republic	16–25	12–25	13–25			41–75	P2 P3
16 May	18:00	Bulgaria	3–1	Romania	25–22	25–16	26–28	25–20		101–86	P2 P3
17 May	16:00	Moldova	1–3	Albania	21–25	26–24	23–25	23–25		93–99	P2 P3
17 May	18:00	Czech Republic	1–3	Bulgaria	24–26	28–26	22–25	20–25		94–102	P2 P3

=== Pool G ===
- Venue: Palais des Sports, Marseille, France
- Dates: May 13–17, 2009
- All times are Central European Summer Time (UTC+02:00)

Pos	Team	Pld	W	L	Pts	SW	SL	SR	SPW	SPL	SPR
1	Spain	4	4	0	8	12	5	2.400	375	316	1.187
2	France	4	3	1	7	11	6	1.833	402	334	1.204
3	Slovenia	4	2	2	6	9	8	1.125	354	362	0.978
4	Greece	4	1	3	5	7	9	0.778	332	346	0.960
5	Finland	4	0	4	4	1	12	0.083	216	321	0.673

Date	Time		Score		Set 1	Set 2	Set 3	Set 4	Set 5	Total	Report
13 May	18:00	Spain	3–1	Greece	25–20	18–25	25–20	25–15		93–80	P2 P3
13 May	20:30	Slovenia	3–0	Finland	25–16	25–17	25–22			75–55	P2 P3
14 May	18:00	Greece	3–0	Finland	25–19	25–17	25–14			75–50	P2 P3
14 May	20:30	France	3–1	Slovenia	24–26	25–20	25–11	25–20		99–77	P2 P3
15 May	18:00	France	3–1	Finland	25–22	25–20	21–25	25–14		96–81	P2 P3
15 May	20:30	Slovenia	2–3	Spain	25–19	24–26	25–21	15–25	8–15	97–106	P2 P3
16 May	18:00	Finland	0–3	Spain	12–25	5–25	13–25			30–75	P2 P3
16 May	20:30	France	3–1	Greece	23–25	25–19	25–23	25–8		98–75	P2 P3
17 May	15:00	Greece	2–3	Slovenia	25–20	25–20	23–25	16–25	13–15	102–105	P2 P3
17 May	17:30	France	2–3	Spain	25–16	23–25	24–26	25–19	12–15	109–101	P2 P3

== Third round ==
=== Pool H ===
- Venue: Zoppas Arena, Conegliano, Italy
- Dates: July 17–19, 2009
- All times are Central European Summer Time (UTC+02:00)

Pos	Team	Pld	W	L	Pts	SW	SL	SR	SPW	SPL	SPR
1	Italy	3	3	0	6	9	2	4.500	259	217	1.194
2	Czech Republic	3	2	1	5	6	5	1.200	254	252	1.008
3	Belarus	3	1	2	4	4	7	0.571	229	257	0.891
4	Bulgaria	3	0	3	3	4	9	0.444	279	295	0.946

Date	Time		Score		Set 1	Set 2	Set 3	Set 4	Set 5	Total	Report
17 Jul	18:00	Czech Republic	3–1	Bulgaria	21–25	25–21	25–23	25–19		96–88	P2 P3
17 Jul	20:30	Italy	3–0	Belarus	25–13	25–19	25–18			75–50	P2 P3
18 Jul	18:00	Bulgaria	1–3	Belarus	25–18	16–25	23–25	22–25		86–93	P2 P3
18 Jul	20:30	Italy	3–0	Czech Republic	26–24	25–13	27–25			78–62	P2 P3
19 Jul	18:00	Belarus	1–3	Czech Republic	21–25	25–21	18–25	22–25		86–96	P2 P3
19 Jul	20:30	Italy	3–2	Bulgaria	22–25	25–22	19–25	25–23	15–10	106–105	P2 P3

=== Pool I ===
- Venue: Hala Sportova Dudova Suma, Subotica, Serbia
- Dates: July 17–19, 2009
- All times are Central European Summer Time (UTC+02:00)

Pos	Team	Pld	W	L	Pts	SW	SL	SR	SPW	SPL	SPR
1	Serbia	3	3	0	6	9	2	4.500	275	208	1.322
2	Croatia	3	2	1	5	7	6	1.167	283	261	1.084
3	Romania	3	1	2	4	5	7	0.714	223	279	0.799
4	Spain	3	0	3	3	3	9	0.333	234	267	0.876

Date	Time		Score		Set 1	Set 2	Set 3	Set 4	Set 5	Total	Report
17 Jul	18:00	Spain	0–3	Serbia	15–25	20–25	14–25			49–75	P2 P3
17 Jul	20:30	Croatia	3–1	Romania	22–25	25–11	25–16	25–6		97–58	P2 P3
18 Jul	18:00	Serbia	3–1	Romania	25–17	26–28	25–15	25–15		101–75	P2 P3
18 Jul	20:30	Spain	2–3	Croatia	23–25	25–14	25–22	17–25	14–16	104–102	P2 P3
19 Jul	18:00	Romania	3–1	Spain	15–25	25–19	25–20	25–17		90–81	P2 P3
19 Jul	20:30	Croatia	1–3	Serbia	22–25	26–24	17–25	19–25		84–99	P2 P3

=== Pool J ===
- Venue: Hala Podpromie, Rzeszów, Poland
- Dates: July 17–19, 2009
- All times are Central European Summer Time (UTC+02:00)

Pos	Team	Pld	W	L	Pts	SW	SL	SR	SPW	SPL	SPR
1	Turkey	3	3	0	6	9	1	9.000	251	202	1.243
2	Poland	3	2	1	5	7	5	1.400	283	257	1.101
3	Belgium	3	1	2	4	5	7	0.714	239	265	0.902
4	France	3	0	3	3	1	9	0.111	196	245	0.800

Date	Time		Score		Set 1	Set 2	Set 3	Set 4	Set 5	Total	Report
17 Jul	17:30	France	0–3	Turkey	18–25	18–25	21–25			57–75	P2 P3
17 Jul	20:00	Poland	3–2	Belgium	23–25	25–14	25–21	19–25	16–14	108–99	P2 P3
18 Jul	17:30	Turkey	3–0	Belgium	25–21	25–13	25–18			75–52	P2 P3
18 Jul	20:00	Poland	3–0	France	25–17	25–10	32–30			82–57	P2 P3
19 Jul	14:00	Belgium	3–1	France	25–19	25–19	13–25	25–19		88–82	P2 P3
19 Jul	16:30	Poland	1–3	Turkey	23–25	19–25	25–23	26–28		93–101	P2 P3

=== Pool K ===
- Venue: Topsportcentrum, Almere, Netherlands
- Dates: July 17–19, 2009
- All times are Central European Summer Time (UTC+02:00)

Pos	Team	Pld	W	L	Pts	SW	SL	SR	SPW	SPL	SPR
1	Germany	3	3	0	6	9	2	4.500	259	223	1.161
2	Netherlands	3	2	1	5	6	4	1.500	239	210	1.138
3	Azerbaijan	3	1	2	4	5	8	0.625	254	271	0.937
4	Slovenia	3	0	3	3	3	9	0.333	227	275	0.825

Date	Time		Score		Set 1	Set 2	Set 3	Set 4	Set 5	Total	Report
17 Jul	17:30	Netherlands	3–1	Slovenia	25–18	28–30	25–19	25–14		103–81	P2 P3
17 Jul	20:00	Germany	3–2	Azerbaijan	25–18	25–21	20–25	24–26	15–13	109–103	P2 P3
18 Jul	17:30	Azerbaijan	0–3	Netherlands	20–25	19–25	15–25			54–75	P2 P3
18 Jul	20:00	Slovenia	0–3	Germany	14–25	22–25	23–25			59–75	P2 P3
19 Jul	13:30	Azerbaijan	3–2	Slovenia	18–25	25–9	14–25	25–18	15–10	97–87	P2 P3
19 Jul	16:00	Netherlands	0–3	Germany	23–25	20–25	18–25			61–75	P2 P3
