= 2010 FIVB Women's Volleyball World Championship qualification (AVC) =

The AVC qualification for the 2010 FIVB Women's Volleyball World Championship saw member nations compete for four places at the finals in Japan.

== Draw ==
13 of the 65 AVC national teams entered qualification. (Solomon Islands and Maldives later withdrew) The teams were distributed according to their position in the FIVB Senior Women's Rankings as of 5 January 2008 using the serpentine system for their distribution. (Rankings shown in brackets) Teams ranked 1–2 did not compete in the second round, and automatically qualified for the third round.

First round

Pool A (Oceania)

Tonga (84)
Fiji (—)
Samoa (—)
~~Solomon Islands (—)~~
New Zealand (92)

Second round

Pool B	Pool C
Kazakhstan (16); Uzbekistan (47); ~~Maldives (—)~~; 1st Pool A	Chinese Taipei (17); Thailand (18); Bangladesh (—); 2nd Pool A

Third round

Pool D	Pool E
China (6); 1st Pool C 2nd Pool B 3rd Pool C	South Korea (11); 1st Pool B 2nd Pool C 3rd Pool B

== First round ==
=== Pool A ===
- Venue: Te Rauparaha Arena, Porirua, New Zealand
- Dates: April 20–24, 2009
- All times are New Zealand Standard Time (UTC+12:00)

Pos	Team	Pld	W	L	Pts	SW	SL	SR	SPW	SPL	SPR
1	New Zealand	3	3	0	6	9	1	9.000	245	182	1.346
2	Fiji	3	2	1	5	6	5	1.200	220	243	0.905
3	Samoa	3	1	2	4	6	6	1.000	261	237	1.101
4	Tonga	3	0	3	3	0	9	0.000	162	226	0.717

Date	Time		Score		Set 1	Set 2	Set 3	Set 4	Set 5	Total	Report
20 Apr	17:30	Fiji	3–2	Samoa	13–25	25–17	14–25	25–21	15–10	92–98	P2 P3
21 Apr	19:30	New Zealand	3–1	Samoa	25–21	25–23	20–25	25–19		95–88	P2 P3
22 Apr	13:30	Tonga	0–3	Samoa	20–25	14–25	16–25			50–75	P2 P3
22 Apr	17:30	New Zealand	3–0	Fiji	25–15	25–16	25–21			75–52	P2 P3
23 Apr	17:30	Tonga	0–3	Fiji	23–25	23–25	24–26			70–76	P2 P3
24 Apr	17:30	Tonga	0–3	New Zealand	15–25	10–25	17–25			42–75	P2 P3

== Second round ==
=== Pool B ===
- Venue: The Sports Palace, Oskemen, Kazakhstan
- Dates: June 16–18, 2009
- All times are Almaty Time (UTC+06:00)

Pos	Team	Pld	W	L	Pts	SW	SL	SR	SPW	SPL	SPR
1	Kazakhstan	2	2	0	4	6	0	MAX	150	76	1.974
2	Uzbekistan	2	1	1	3	3	3	1.000	109	131	0.832
3	New Zealand	2	0	2	2	0	6	0.000	98	150	0.653

Date	Time		Score		Set 1	Set 2	Set 3	Set 4	Set 5	Total	Report
16 Jun	18:00	New Zealand	0–3	Uzbekistan	20–25	17–25	19–25			56–75	P2 P3
17 Jun	18:00	Kazakhstan	3–0	New Zealand	25–9	25–15	25–18			75–42	P2 P3
18 Jun	18:00	Uzbekistan	0–3	Kazakhstan	10–25	15–25	9–25			34–75	P2 P3

=== Pool C ===
- Venue: Nakhon Pathom Sport Center, Nakhon Pathom, Thailand
- Dates: June 12–14, 2009
- All times are Indochina Time (UTC+07:00)

Pos	Team	Pld	W	L	Pts	SW	SL	SR	SPW	SPL	SPR
1	Thailand	3	3	0	6	9	2	4.500	263	128	2.055
2	Chinese Taipei	3	2	1	5	8	3	2.667	239	186	1.285
3	Fiji	3	1	2	4	3	6	0.500	163	170	0.959
4	Bangladesh	3	0	3	3	0	9	0.000	44	225	0.196

Date	Time		Score		Set 1	Set 2	Set 3	Set 4	Set 5	Total	Report
12 Jun	14:00	Bangladesh	0–3	Chinese Taipei	6–25	6–25	7–25			19–75	P2 P3
12 Jun	16:00	Thailand	3–0	Fiji	25–11	25–11	25–12			75–34	P2 P3
13 Jun	14:00	Fiji	0–3	Chinese Taipei	18–25	21–25	15–25			54–75	P2 P3
13 Jun	16:00	Thailand	3–0	Bangladesh	25–1	25–1	25–3			75–5	P2 P3
14 Jun	14:00	Bangladesh	0–3	Fiji	4–25	6–25	10–25			20–75	P2 P3
14 Jun	16:00	Chinese Taipei	2–3	Thailand	29–27	15–25	25–21	11–25	9–15	89–113	P2 P3

== Third round ==
=== Pool D ===
- Venue: Sichuan Provincial Gymnasium, Chengdu, China
- Dates: July 3–5, 2009
- All times are China Standard Time (UTC+08:00)

Pos	Team	Pld	W	L	Pts	SW	SL	SR	SPW	SPL	SPR
1	China	3	3	0	6	9	0	MAX	225	116	1.940
2	Thailand	3	2	1	5	6	3	2.000	204	162	1.259
3	Uzbekistan	3	1	2	4	3	6	0.500	146	212	0.689
4	Fiji	3	0	3	3	0	9	0.000	140	225	0.622

Date	Time		Score		Set 1	Set 2	Set 3	Set 4	Set 5	Total	Report
03 Jul	15:30	Thailand	3–0	Uzbekistan	25–17	25–10	25–17			75–44	P2 P3
03 Jul	20:30	China	3–0	Fiji	25–10	25–12	25–13			75–35	P2 P3
04 Jul	15:30	China	3–0	Uzbekistan	25–5	25–9	25–13			75–27	P2 P3
04 Jul	20:00	Thailand	3–0	Fiji	25–13	25–15	25–15			75–43	P2 P3
05 Jul	15:30	Fiji	0–3	Uzbekistan	21–25	18–25	23–25			62–75	P2 P3
05 Jul	20:00	China	3–0	Thailand	25–17	25–22	25–15			75–54	P2 P3

=== Pool E ===
- Venue: Municipal Gymnasium, Chiayi, Taiwan
- Dates: August 28–30, 2009
- All times are Chungyuan Standard Time (UTC+08:00)

Pos	Team	Pld	W	L	Pts	SW	SL	SR	SPW	SPL	SPR
1	South Korea	3	3	0	6	9	2	4.500	267	185	1.443
2	Kazakhstan	3	2	1	5	7	4	1.750	251	195	1.287
3	Chinese Taipei	3	1	2	4	5	6	0.833	231	221	1.045
4	New Zealand	3	0	3	3	0	9	0.000	77	225	0.342

Date	Time		Score		Set 1	Set 2	Set 3	Set 4	Set 5	Total	Report
28 Aug	15:00	New Zealand	0–3	South Korea	8–25	8–25	8–25			24–75	P2 P3
28 Aug	18:30	Chinese Taipei	1–3	Kazakhstan	18–25	16–25	25–20	17–25		76–95	P2 P3
29 Aug	15:00	Kazakhstan	1–3	South Korea	24–26	25–18	18–25	14–25		81–94	P2 P3
29 Aug	17:30	Chinese Taipei	3–0	New Zealand	25–7	25–11	25–10			75–28	P2 P3
30 Aug	15:00	Kazakhstan	3–0	New Zealand	25–8	25–8	25–9			75–25	P2 P3
30 Aug	17:00	Chinese Taipei	1–3	South Korea	15–25	20–25	25–23	20–25		80–98	P2 P3
