= Boris Yeltsin Volleyball Cup =

International women's volleyball tournament

The Boris Yeltsin Volleyball Cup is an annual international women's volleyball tournament. It is named after the first president of Russia, Boris Yeltsin. Since 2008, the tournament has been held in Yekaterinburg, Russia.

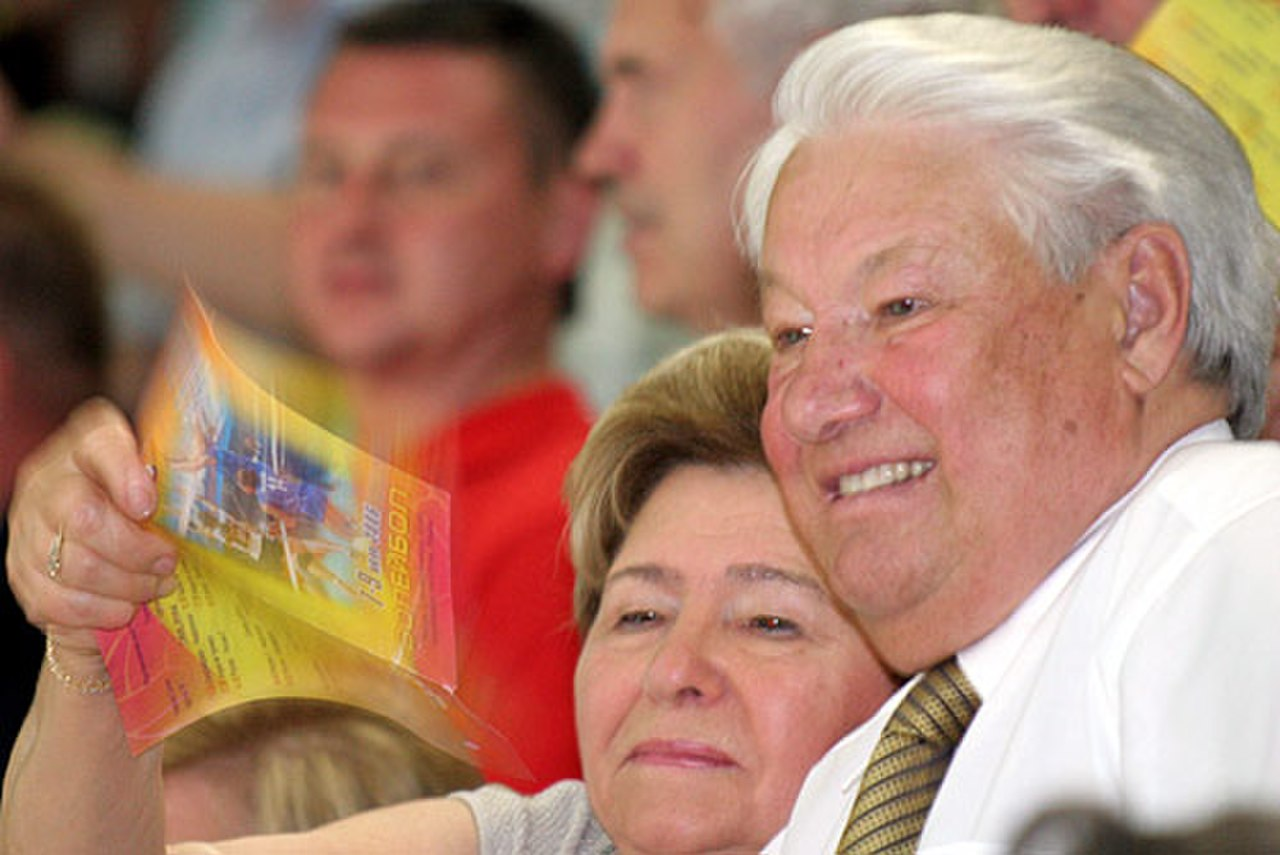
Boris and Naina Yeltsin on the fourth tournament (2006)

== Medalists ==
Date	1st place	2nd place	3rd place
2003, June 11—16	Russia	China	Azerbaijan
2004, April 20–25	Russia	Cuba	Azerbaijan
2005, June 15—19	Russia	Netherlands	Turkey
2006, July 7—12	China	Russia	Netherlands
2007, June 28 — July 3	China	Netherlands	Russia
2008, June 11—16	Russia	Bulgaria	Netherlands
2009, June 28 — July 2	Russia	Japan	Netherlands
2010, July 6—11	Russia	China	Netherlands
2011, July 5—10	China	Brazil	Russia
2012, July 4—8	Russia	Italy	Brazil
2013, June 26—30	Russia	Italy	Dominican Republic
2014, July 9—13	Bulgaria	Russia	Netherlands
2015, June 17—21	Russia	China	Czech Republic
2016, September 19—21	Switzerland	Russia	(Russia) Dinamo Krasnodar
2017, June 26—30	Serbia	Russia	Turkey
2018, May 15—17	Netherlands	Russia	Thailand

== History ==
In the summer of 2002, Nikolay Karpol (the head coach of the Russian women's national volleyball team and Uralochka) met with Boris Yeltsin to discuss a new international volleyball competition. Yeltsin agreed for the tournament to be named after him; at the same time Karpol's initiative was strongly supported by the governor of Sverdlovsk Oblast, Eduard Rossel. The winners would receive a trophy made by stonecutters from the Ural Mountains.

=== 2003 ===
The first tournament of the Yeltsin Cup, which featured 8 national teams, was scheduled to match the opening of two large arenas in central Ural — the Palace of Sporting Games "Uralochka" in Yekaterinburg and the sports and health complex Metallurg-Forum in Nizhny Tagil. The first winner of the Yeltsin Cup was the Russian national team with no losses.

Finals: Russia vs China 3:1 (25:16, 25:23, 27:29, 26:24)

Third place play-off: Azerbaijan vs USA 3:2 (22:25, 28:26, 25:22, 18:25, 15:11)

=== 2004 ===
The 2004 tournament was held in April, instead of June, due to national teams preparing for the Olympic Games in Athens. Russia defeated Cuba in the finals.

Finals: Russia vs. Cuba — 3:0 (25:19, 25:21, 25:23)

Third place play-off: Azerbaijan vs. Dominican Republic — 3:2 (23:25, 25:21, 20:25, 25:18, 15:6)

=== 2005 ===
The 2005 tournament differed from the previous two tournaments: the number of teams was reduced to six and the competition's format changed to a single-round tournament with no play-offs. At the end of the last match, where the Russian national team, led by new coach Giovanni Caprara, lost to Team Azerbaijan in five plays, the tournament winner was not immediately determined. Spectators had to wait for the results of the points calculations in all matches played by the Russian and Netherlands national teams, which at the end of the round had tied in both win-lose ratio (4:1) and plays ratio (14:6). Scoring determined that the Russians won with 0.026. Turkey won against Azerbaijan for third place, which was also determined by a better plays ratio.

=== 2006 ===
The Russian and Chinese teams were the final teams of the fourth Yeltsin Cup tournament. The Chinese team won in five plays. Yeltsin participated in the award ceremony for the last time.

Finals: China vs. Russia — 3:2 (25:22, 14:25, 25:20, 18:25, 15:9)

Third place play-off: Netherlands vs. Turkey — 3:0 (25:17, 25:21, 26:24)

=== 2007 ===
The 2007 tournament was the first to be unattended by Yeltsin following his death on 23 April. It is also the first tournament to be included in the official FIVB schedule.

The Chinese national team won against the Dutch in the finals. For the first time in the Yeltsin Cup tournament, the Russian team participated as the reigning world champion, even though some of their key players were not participating. It was also the first time that players of any local club were not among the national team players. Uralochka trainee Olga Fateeva was among the top three players of the tournament (the first being the captain of the Turkish national team Neslihan Darnel) and was recognized as the tournament's MVP).

Finals: China vs the Netherlands — 3:1 (25:21, 22:25, 25:18, 37:35)

Third place play-off: Russia vs Turkey — 3:1 (19:25, 25:23, 25:23, 25:20)

=== 2008 ===
The tournament, like 2005, was a single-round tournament with no play-offs. The Russians won first place one round before the end of the competition. National team captain Marina Sheshenina and volleyball player Yekaterina Gamova became four-time winners of the First President of Russia Cup.

=== 2009 ===
Russia won the 2009 Yeltsin Cup. Ural native Marina Sheshenina, who participated in all five victorious tournaments of the Russian National Team, was awarded the "Miss Tournament" prize, while Japanese passer Yoshie Takeshita was awarded with the "For loyalty to Volleyball" prize.

Finals: Russia vs. Japan — 3:2 (20:25, 25:20, 25:18, 20:25, 16:14)

Third place play-off: Netherlands vs. Cuba — 3:0 (25:17, 25:23, 25:21)

=== 2010 ===
Six teams participated in the 2010 tournament, of which Russia won first place. Chinese middle blocker Xue Ming was awarded the Yeltsin Cup MVP prize, Dutch Manon Flier received the "Miss Tournament" award, and the Russian team passer Yevgeniya Startseva was called the best young player.

Finals: Russia vs. China — 3:0 (30:28, 25:16, 25:17)

Third place play-off: Netherlands vs. Italy — 3:0 (25:23, 25:19, 25:23)

=== 2011 ===
Gamova, Lyubov Sokolova, Ekaterina Kabeshova, and Svetlana Kryuchkova were not on the roster of Russia's team. In the semifinals, Russia lost to first-timer Brazil with a score of 2:3. China won first place, while Russia won third place against Poland.

Finals: China vs. Brazil — 3:2 (37:35, 19:25, 25:27, 25:23, 15:10)

Third place playoff: Russia vs. Poland — 3:2 (22:25, 25:22, 25:22, 22:25, 16:14)

=== 2012 ===
The 2012 tournament was a round-robin among five teams. Russia scored 3:0 (25:23, 25:18, 25:22) against Italy and became won the Cup for the seventh time. Individual prizes included:

- MVP — Yekaterina Gamova
- Miss Tournament — Nataliya Obmochaeva
- Best young player — Yevgeniya Startseva

=== 2013 ===
In 2013, most of the participating teams significantly changed their rosters. In the final match, Russia won against Italy. Paolo Tofoli led the play of "Squadra Azzurra" in Yekaterinburg instead of head coach Marco Mercanelli, who stayed in the Apennines. His playmaker Indre Sorocaite became the tournament's MVP. The victory parade included members of the USSR national team, who won a gold medal in the 1988 Seoul Olympics.

Finals: Russia vs. Italy — 3:1 (22:25, 25:21, 25:14, 25:18)

Third place playoff: Dominican Republic vs. Cuba — 3:1 (25:16, 25:27, 25:22, 25:22)

=== 2014 ===
In 2014 the Bulgarian team won. Russia lost its key players that year — Nataliya Obmochaeva, Tatiana Kosheleva, Iuliia Morozova, Anastasia Shlyakhovaya. After winning against Dutch and the Dominican Republic, they made it to the semi-finals due to the Dutch victory over the Dominicans in the final day of the group stage. Both semifinal matches resulted in 3:2 — Russia beat Japan, while Bulgaria won against the Dutch. MVP was awarded to Netherlands National Team playmaker Judith Pietersen. Fans actively participated in a charity lottery called "My vmeste" (We are together) and collected 91,450 rubles over the competition's five days.

Finals: Bulgaria vs. Russia — 3:2 (16:25, 25:20, 28:30, 25:23, 15:11)

Third place play-off: Netherlands vs. Japan — 3:0 (25:22, 25:14, 25:17).

=== 2015 ===
The tournament was contested by five teams in a round robin. Israel and Czech Republic National Teams became the new contestants in the Yeltsin Cup. Russia National Team became the victor of the tournament with no play lost. Russian team opposite Nataliya Obmochaeva was awarded MVP, Moran Zur (Israel) — the best playmaker, Yekaterina Zhdanova — the best blocker, Anna Malova (Russia) — the best libero, Gung Xianiu (China) — the best server, Pavla Winkourowa (Czech Republic) — the best setter, Ksenia Alexandrovna Ilchenko — the best young player of Russia national Team, Aleksandra Pasynkova got "Miss Tournament" award.

=== 2016 ===
In 2016 the tournament was delayed to September and dedicated to the 50th anniversary of the Uralochka-NTMK volleyball club. Due to the demands of the sports schedule in the Olympic season, an alternative team roster applied to participate in the Yeltsin Cup. Uralochka, with two Kazan Dynamo volleyball players (Irina Zaryazhko and Daria Stolyarova) and led by Nikolay Karpol and Rishat Giliazutdinov, represented the Russia national team. Switzerland, represented by the Volero team (Zürich) under Zoran Terzić's leadership, won the tournament. Volero playmaker Dobriana Rabajiyeva was recognized as the MVP of the 14th Yeltsin Cup.

=== 2017 ===
Five teams participated in the 15th Yeltsin Cup play-off. Russia and Serbia faced off in the finals before the latter won in five plays. Individual awards went to Russians Yevgeniya Startseva (best passer), Irina Koroleva (best blocker), Anna Lazareva (best young player); Radmila Beresneva from Kazakhstan (best server); Turkish Simge Şebnem Aköz (best libero); Bulgarian Elitsa Vasileva ("Miss Tournament"); and Serbians Bojana Živković (best passer) and Brankica Mihajlović (MVP).

=== 2018 ===
The 2018 Yeltsin Cup 2018 was part of the 2018 FIVB Volleyball Women's Nations League, and consisted of Russia, Argentina, the Netherlands, and Thailand. The Netherlands won 3:0 against Russia in the finals.

== Participants ==
	03	04	05	06	07	08	09	10	11	12	13	14	15	16	17	18
Argentina	—	—	—	—	—	—	—	—	—	—	—	—	—	—	—	4
Azerbaijan	3	3	4	5	6	—	6	—	—	—	—	—	—	—	—	—
Belarus	—	—	—	—	7	5	5	6	—	—	—	—	—	—	—	—
Brazil	—	—	—	—	—	—	—	—	2	3	—	—	—	—	—	—
Bulgaria	—	—	5	—	—	2	—	—	—	—	—	1	—	—	4	—
Czech Republic	—	—	—	—	—	—	—	—	—	—	—	—	3	—	—	—
China	2	—	—	1	1	—	—	2	1	—	—	—	2	—	—	—
Croatia	8	8	—	—	—	6	—	—	—	—	—	—	—	—	—	—
Cuba	—	2	6	6	—	—	4	—	—	4	4	—	—	—	—	—
(Russia) Dinamo Krasnodar	—	—	—	—	—	—	—	—	—	—	—	—	—	3	—	—
Dominican Republic	—	4	—	—	—	—	—	—	—	—	3	5	—	—	—	—
Germany	—	—	—	—	—	—	—	5	—	—	—	—	—	—	—	—
Israel	—	—	—	—	—	—	—	—	—	—	—	—	4	—	—	—
Italy	5	—	—	—	—	—	—	4	—	2	2	—	—	—	—	—
Japan	6	—	—	—	5	—	2	—	—	—	5	4	—	—	—	—
Kazakhstan	—	—	—	7	—	—	—	—	—	—	—	6	5	—	5	—
Netherlands	—	—	2	3	2	3	3	3	5	—	—	3	—	—	—	1
Poland	—	—	—	—	—	—	—	—	4	5	6	—	—	—	—	—
Russia	1	1	1	2	3	1	1	1	3	1	1	2	1	2	2	2
Russia-2	—	—	—	8	8	—	—	—	—	—	—	—	—	—	—	—
Serbia	—	—	—	—	—	—	—	—	—	—	—	—	—	—	1	—
Switzerland	—	—	—	—	—	—	—	—	—	—	—	—	—	1	—	—
Thailand	—	7	—	—	—	—	—	—	—	—	—	—	—	—	—	3
Turkey	7	6	3	4	4	—	—	—	—	—	—	—	—	4	3	—
Ukraine	—	—	—	—	—	4	—	—	6	—	—	—	—	—	—	—
United States	4	5	—	—	—	—	—	—	—	—	—	—	—	—	—	—

== Links ==
- Official website
