= Moldova women's national volleyball team =

Women's national volleyball team representing Moldova

Moldova
- Association: Moldova Volleyball Federation
- Confederation: CEV
- FIVB ranking: NR (29 June 2025)

Uniforms
Home	Away

The Moldova women's national volleyball team ( Romanian : Echipa națională de volei feminin a Republicii Moldova ) represents Moldova in international women's volleyball competitions and friendly matches, The team is managed by the Moldovan Volleyball Federation ( Romanian : Federație de Volei din Republica Moldova : FVRM ) that is a part of the Federation of International Volleyball (FIVB) as well as the European Volleyball Confederation (CEV), The Moldova team follows the Balkan Volleyball Association (BVA).

== History ==
After Moldova gained independence from the Soviet Union, the Moldovan Volleyball Federation joined the FIVB and the CEV in 1992.

The debut of the Moldovan women's volleyball team in official international competitions took place in 2004, when the team took part in the qualifying tournament of the European Championship 2005 (category "B"). In the first match they defeated another debutant, the national team of Georgia with the score 3:0. Moldavians lost the next seven matches, including Slovenia, Croatia, Sweden (twice each) and, finally, Georgia.

A few years later, the Moldavian team took part in the European Championship qualifiers twice in (2007 and 2009), but they lost all their games. In January 2009 they started for the first time in the FIVB World Championship qualification and dealt with their rivals in the qualifying group of the 1st round. The group tournament was held in Tallinn and in the first match they beat the national team of Denmark 3:0, then snatched a victory from the host of the tournament the national team of Estonia with score of 3:2, and on the last day of the competition they defeated Georgia. The 2nd round of qualification turned out to be their last. The teams of Albania, Bulgaria, Czech Republic and Romania were stronger, and they only won a single set, against the Albanians.

In the next qualifying tournament of the 2014 World Championship, the team lost to all the teams in their qualification group, the teams of Ukraine, Hungary and Albania, without scoring a single goal.
