= Nederlandse Volleybalbond =

Governing body of volleyball in the Netherlands

Dutch Volleyball Association
- Sport: Volleyball; Beach volleyball
- Jurisdiction: Netherlands
- Abbreviation: NeVoBo
- Founded: 1947
- Affiliation: FIVB
- Affiliation date: 1947
- Headquarters: Nieuwegein
- Location: Netherlands

Official website
- volleybal.nl
- (Netherlands)

The Dutch Volleyball Association or in (Dutch : Nederlandse Volleybalbond, NeVoBo) is an organisation founded in 1947 to govern the practice of volleyball in the Netherlands.

It organises the men's and women's championships, and places the men's and women's national team under its aegis. The NeVoBo joined the FIVB in 1947.

== NeVoBo members ==
This table shows the evolution of the number of members and associations through the years:

Year	Membership	Associations
2019	112.183	981
2018	115.568	1.008
2017	117.783	1.020
2016	117.053	1.047
2015	116.820	1.064
2014	118.295	1.076
2013	116.354	1.105
2012	116.539	1.119
2011	120.186	1.141
2010	125.785	1.166
2009	125.195	1.195
2008	127.047	1.232
2007	127.308	1.247
2006	128.089	1.287
2005	128.693	1.310
2004	128.202	1.406
2003	126.735	1.405
2002	127.054	1.463
2001		1.534
1999	140.549	1.507
1996	151.332	1.586
1993	155.292	
1990	164.057	
1987	160.926	
1984	160.117	
1981	148.988	
1978	112.000	

== Region divisions ==
The NeVoBo is traditionally divided into several regions. There are currently four regions, however in the past there were more than ten.

The current regions are:

- NeVoBo region North
- NeVoBo region East
- NeVoBo region West
- NeVoBo region South

== Controversy ==
=== Selection of convicted child rapist ===
In 2024, the Dutch Volleyball Federation nominated beach volleyball player Steven van de Velde for its 2024 Olympics team, setting aside the fact that he is a convicted child rapist and has been placed on the sex offender registry in the United Kingdom for life since 2016. The Committee stood by their nomination despite his criminal record for sex crimes and even after the outcry from the British and American public, asserting that van de Velde has "served his sentence".
