= Dutch Women's Volleyball League =

Eredivisie dames
- Current season, competition or edition: 2021–22 Volleyball Eredivisie dames
- Sport: Volleyball
- Founded: 1947
- First season: 1947
- Administrator: Nevobo
- No. of teams: 10 (2021–22)
- Country: Netherlands
- Continent: Europe
- Most recent champion: Sliedrecht Sport (5th title)
- Most titles: Celebes Den Haag (11 titles)
- Level on pyramid: 1
- Relegation to: 2nd League
- Domestic cups: Dutch Cup; Dutch Super Cup
- International cups: CEV Champions League; CEV Cup; CEV Challenge Cup
- Website: https://www.volleybal.nl/

The Netherlands Women's Volleyball Eredevisie is a major volleyball competition, which began in the Netherlands in 1947. It is organized by the Dutch Volleyball Federation (Nederlandse Volleybalbond, Nevobo) .

== Competition formula ==
The 2021/22 League A championship consisted of a preliminary stage and a playoff. At the preliminary stage, the participating teams plays in a regular home and away tournament. The top 8 teams advance to the playoffs. 13 teams played in League A in 2021/22: Talenttim-Papendal (Arnhem), Slieedrecht Sport (Sliedrecht), Apollo 8 (Borne), Regio-Zwolle (Zwolle), Sneek, Boleans (Utrecht), Laudamme (Capelle aan den IJssel), Pelpus (Meyel), Draisma-Dynamo (Apeldoorn), ARBO (Rotterdam), Airsped-Twente (Almelo), Voltena (Werkendam), Lammerink-Set-Ap'65 (Otmarsum). The championship title was won by Sliedrecht Sport for the Eight times in their history, beating up Apollo 8 in a final series 2-0 (3:0, 3:1). 3rd place went to "Regio Zwolle".

== List of Champions ==
| Years | Champions |
|---|---|
| 1948 | AMVJ Amstelveen |
| 1949 | Celebes Den Haag |
| 1950 | SOS 's-Gravenhage |
| 1951 | VC Boemerang |
| 1952 | VC Boemerang |
| 1953 | VC Boemerang |
| 1954 | VC Boemerang |
| 1955 | Celebes Den Haag |
| 1956 | Celebes Den Haag |
| 1957 | VC Boemerang |
| 1958 | Celebes Den Haag |
| 1959 | Celebes Den Haag |
| 1960 | RVC Rotterdam |
| 1961 | VC Boemerang |
| 1962 | VC Boemerang |
| 1963 | VC Boemerang |
| 1964 | Celebes Den Haag |
| 1965 | Celebes Den Haag |
| 1966 | Celebes Den Haag |
| 1967 | Celebes Den Haag |
| 1968 | Valbovol Woerden |
| 1969 | Haag '68 Den Haag |
| 1970 | Bekkerveld |
| 1971 | Bekkerveld |
| 1972 | Detry/Haag '68 |
| 1973 | Bekkerveld |

| Years | Champions |
|---|---|
| 1974 | Van Houten/VCH |
| 1975 | Van Houten/VCH |
| 1976 | Van Houten/VCH |
| 1977 | Van Houten/VCH |
| 1978 | Van Houten/VCH |
| 1979 | DVC Dokkum |
| 1980 | Prins/DVC Dokkum |
| 1981 | Prins/DVC Dokkum |
| 1982 | FBTO/DVC |
| 1983 | FBTO/DVC |
| 1984 | Ubbink/Orion |
| 1985 | Tromp/Olympus |
| 1986 | Tromp/Olympus |
| 1987 | Avéro/Olympus Sneek |
| 1988 | Avéro/OS |
| 1989 | Avéro/OS |
| 1990 | Avéro/OS |
| 1991 | Avéro/OS |
| 1992 | Avéro/OS |
| 1993 | Bonduelle/VVC |
| 1994 | Etiflex/Ommen |
| 1995 | AMVJ Amstelveen |
| 1996 | Bonduelle/VVC |
| 1997 | Bonduelle/VVC |
| 1998 | ARKE/Pollux Oldenzaal |
| 1999 | ARKE/Pollux Oldenzaal |

| Years | Champions |
|---|---|
| 2000 | Facopa VC Weert |
| 2001 | ARKE/Pollux Oldenzaal |
| 2002 | ARKE/Pollux Oldenzaal |
| 2003 | ARKE/Pollux Oldenzaal |
| 2004 | Longa '59 Lichtenvoorde |
| 2005 | Longa '59 Lichtenvoorde |
| 2006 | HCCnet / Martinus |
| 2007 | DELA/Martinus Amstelveen |
| 2008 | DELA/Martinus Amstelveen |
| 2009 | DELA/Martinus Amstelveen |
| 2010 | TVC Amstelveen |
| 2011 | VC Weert |
| 2012 | Sliedrecht Sport |
| 2013 | Sliedrecht Sport |
| 2014 | VV Alterno |
| 2015 | VC Sneek |
| 2016 | VC Sneek |
| 2017 | Sliedrecht Sport |
| 2018 | Sliedrecht Sport |
| 2019 | Sliedrecht Sport |
| 2020 | Sliedrecht Sport |
| 2021 | Sliedrecht Sport |
| 2022 | Sliedrecht Sport |
| 2023 | |
| 2024 | |
