= 2018 FIVB Women's Volleyball World Championship qualification (NORCECA) =

The NORCECA qualification for the 2018 FIVB Women's Volleyball World Championship will see member nations compete for six places at the finals in Japan. USA has directly qualified to 2018 World Championship as the 2014 World Champion.

== Pool compositions ==
34 NORCECA member nations would enter qualification. Canada, Mexico, Dominican Republic, Cuba, Puerto Rico, and Costa Rica directly qualify to the 2017 NORCECA Continental Championship.

CAZOVA and ECVA will have two rounds of qualification. The two highest seeded teams from each zone according to the January 1, 2016 NORCECA Continental Women's Senior Ranking directly qualifies to the second zonal round. The first zonal round will have three groups of four teams.

AFECAVOL zonal qualification will have single round-robin tournament. The top two teams will qualify to the 2017 NORCECA Continental Championship.

=== CAZOVA Zone ===
NORCECA Continental Women's Senior Ranking as of 1 January 2016 is shown in bracket.

==== First round ====
| Group A | Group B | Group C |
|---|---|---|
| Barbados (13) | Suriname (20) | Guadeloupe (21) |
| U.S. Virgin Islands (26) | Haiti (25) | Bahamas (24) |
| Curaçao (27) | Aruba (34) | Bonaire (36) |
| Turks and Caicos Islands (41) | Martinique (38) | Cayman Islands (37) |

==== Second round ====
| Group D | Group E |
|---|---|
| Trinidad and Tobago (8) | Jamaica (11) |
| Bahamas | Guadeloupe |
| Suriname (20) | Martinique (38) |
| U.S. Virgin Islands | Curaçao |

=== ECVA Zone ===
==== First round ====
| Group D | Group E | Group F |
|---|---|---|
| British Virgin Islands (23) | Antigua and Barbuda (19) | Saint Kitts and Nevis (18) |
| Sint Maarten (30) | Saint Vincent (31) | Sint Eustatius (28) |
| Bermuda (35) | Grenada (33) | Saint Martin (29) |
| Anguilla (32) | Montserrat (39) | Saba (40) |

==== Second round ====
| Group D | Group E |
|---|---|
| Saint Lucia (15) | Dominica (17) |
| 2nd Highest Rank of First round | 1st Highest Rank of First round |
| 3rd Highest Rank of First round | 4th Highest Rank of First round |
| 6th Highest Rank of First round | 5th Highest Rank of First round |

St. Lucia was advanced to Final Round by NORCECA when the schedule for the NORCECA Continental Championships Group B schedule was released. St. Lucia was the highest ranking team and therefore was advanced to the Final Round of qualifying.

=== AFECAVOL Zone ===
Single round-robin tournament

Group K
Guatemala (12)
El Salvador (16)
Honduras (14)
Nicaragua (9)
Panama (10)
Belize (22)

== First round ==
=== Group A ===
- Venue: (United States Virgin Islands) Ronald Charles Arena, Saint Croix, U.S. Virgin Islands
- Dates: 6–7 August 2016
- All times are Atlantic Standard Time (UTC−04:00)

| Pos | Team | Pld | W | L | Pts | SPW | SPL | SPR | SW | SL | SR | Qualification |
|---|---|---|---|---|---|---|---|---|---|---|---|---|
| 1 | Curaçao | 3 | 3 | 0 | 15 | 225 | 129 | 1.744 | 9 | 0 | MAX | Second round |
| 2 | U.S. Virgin Islands | 3 | 2 | 1 | 10 | 213 | 148 | 1.439 | 6 | 3 | 2.000 | Second round |
| 3 | Barbados | 3 | 1 | 2 | 5 | 171 | 177 | 0.966 | 3 | 6 | 0.500 | |
| 4 | Turks and Caicos Islands | 3 | 0 | 3 | 0 | 70 | 225 | 0.311 | 0 | 9 | 0.000 | |

| Date | Time | | Score | | Set 1 | Set 2 | Set 3 | Set 4 | Set 5 | Total | Report |
|---|---|---|---|---|---|---|---|---|---|---|---|
| 6 Aug | 17:00 | Curaçao | 3–0 | Turks and Caicos Islands | 25–9 | 25–4 | 25–7 | | | 75–20 | P2 P3 |
| 6 Aug | 19:00 | U.S. Virgin Islands | 3–0 | Barbados | 25–14 | 25–21 | 25–15 | | | 75–50 | P2 P3 |
| 7 Aug | 09:00 | Barbados | 0–3 | Curaçao | 11–25 | 21–25 | 14–25 | | | 46–75 | P2 P3 |
| 7 Aug | 11:00 | U.S. Virgin Islands | 3–0 | Turks and Caicos Islands | 25–3 | 25–11 | 25–9 | | | 75–23 | P2 P3 |
| 7 Aug | 17:00 | Barbados | 3–0 | Turks and Caicos Islands | 25–14 | 25–5 | 25–8 | | | 75–27 | P2 P3 |
| 7 Aug | 19:00 | U.S. Virgin Islands | 0–3 | Curaçao | 22–25 | 20–25 | 21–25 | | | 63–75 | P2 P3 |

=== Group B ===
- Venue: Centro Deportivo Betico Croes, Oranjestad, Aruba
- Dates: 26–27 November 2016
- All times are Atlantic Standard Time (UTC−04:00)

| Pos | Team | Pld | W | L | Pts | SPW | SPL | SPR | SW | SL | SR | Qualification |
|---|---|---|---|---|---|---|---|---|---|---|---|---|
| 1 | Suriname | 3 | 3 | 0 | 14 | 246 | 192 | 1.281 | 9 | 1 | 9.000 | Second round |
| 2 | Martinique | 3 | 2 | 1 | 7 | 261 | 267 | 0.978 | 6 | 6 | 1.000 | Second round |
| 3 | Haiti | 3 | 1 | 2 | 7 | 239 | 239 | 1.000 | 5 | 6 | 0.833 | |
| 4 | Aruba | 3 | 0 | 3 | 0 | 220 | 268 | 0.821 | 0 | 9 | 0.000 | |

| Date | Time | | Score | | Set 1 | Set 2 | Set 3 | Set 4 | Set 5 | Total | Report |
|---|---|---|---|---|---|---|---|---|---|---|---|
| 26 Nov | 17:00 | Suriname | 3–0 | Haiti | 25–21 | 25–16 | 25–20 | | | 75–57 | |
| 26 Nov | 19:00 | Aruba | 1–3 | Martinique | 19–25 | 25–20 | 24–26 | 18–25 | | 86–96 | |
| 27 Nov | 09:00 | Suriname | 3–0 | Martinique | 25–18 | 25–22 | 25–19 | | | 75–59 | |
| 27 Nov | 11:00 | Aruba | 0–3 | Haiti | 16–25 | 18–25 | 24–26 | | | 58–76 | |
| 27 Nov | 17:00 | Martinique | 3–2 | Haiti | 17–25 | 25–19 | 25–23 | 23–25 | 16–14 | 106–106 | |
| 27 Nov | 19:00 | Aruba | 1–3 | Suriname | 19–25 | 25–21 | 13–25 | 19–25 | | 76–96 | |

=== Group C ===
- Venue: Clifton Hunter High School Sports Center, Grand Cayman, Cayman Islands
- Dates: 12–13 November 2016
- All times are Eastern Standard Time (UTC−05:00)

| Pos | Team | Pld | W | L | Pts | SPW | SPL | SPR | SW | SL | SR | Qualification |
|---|---|---|---|---|---|---|---|---|---|---|---|---|
| 1 | Guadeloupe | 3 | 3 | 0 | 15 | 226 | 131 | 1.725 | 9 | 0 | MAX | Second round |
| 2 | Bahamas | 3 | 2 | 1 | 10 | 206 | 149 | 1.383 | 6 | 3 | 2.000 | Second round |
| 3 | Bonaire | 3 | 1 | 2 | 5 | 150 | 198 | 0.758 | 3 | 6 | 0.500 | |
| 4 | Cayman Islands | 3 | 0 | 3 | 0 | 121 | 225 | 0.538 | 0 | 9 | 0.000 | |

| Date | Time | | Score | | Set 1 | Set 2 | Set 3 | Set 4 | Set 5 | Total | Report |
|---|---|---|---|---|---|---|---|---|---|---|---|
| 12 Nov | 17:00 | Guadeloupe | 3–0 | Bahamas | 25–21 | 25–11 | 26–24 | | | 76–56 | P2 P3 |
| 12 Nov | 19:00 | Cayman Islands | 0–3 | Bonaire | 12–25 | 15–25 | 21–25 | | | 48–75 | P2 P3 |
| 13 Nov | 09:00 | Guadeloupe | 3–0 | Bonaire | 25–14 | 25–14 | 25–10 | | | 75–38 | P2 P3 |
| 13 Nov | 11:00 | Cayman Islands | 0–3 | Bahamas | 10–25 | 12–25 | 14–25 | | | 36–75 | P2 P3 |
| 13 Nov | 17:00 | Bonaire | 0–3 | Bahamas | 16–25 | 10–25 | 11–25 | | | 37–75 | P2 P3 |
| 13 Nov | 19:00 | Cayman Islands | 0–3 | Guadeloupe | 14–25 | 7–25 | 16–25 | | | 37–75 | P2 P3 |

=== Group D ===
- Venue: L.B. Scot Sports Auditorium, Philipsburg, Sint Maarten
- Dates: 6–7 August 2016
- All times are Atlantic Standard Time (UTC−04:00)

| Pos | Team | Pld | W | L | Pts | SPW | SPL | SPR | SW | SL | SR |
|---|---|---|---|---|---|---|---|---|---|---|---|
| 1 | Sint Maarten | 3 | 3 | 0 | 11 | 302 | 273 | 1.106 | 9 | 4 | 2.250 |
| 2 | Bermuda | 3 | 2 | 1 | 10 | 265 | 214 | 1.238 | 7 | 4 | 1.750 |
| 3 | Anguilla | 3 | 1 | 2 | 8 | 264 | 255 | 1.035 | 6 | 6 | 1.000 |
| 4 | British Virgin Islands | 2 | 0 | 2 | 1 | 159 | 248 | 0.641 | 1 | 6 | 0.167 |

| Date | Time | | Score | | Set 1 | Set 2 | Set 3 | Set 4 | Set 5 | Total | Report |
|---|---|---|---|---|---|---|---|---|---|---|---|
| 6 Aug | 09:00 | Sint Maarten | 3–2 | Anguilla | 23–25 | 23–25 | 26–24 | 27–25 | 15–11 | 114–110 | P2 P3 |
| 6 Aug | 11:00 | British Virgin Islands | 0–3 | Bermuda | 8–25 | 17–25 | 20–25 | | | 45–75 | P2 P3 |
| 6 Aug | 18:00 | Sint Maarten | 3–1 | Bermuda | 25–22 | 15–25 | 25–22 | 25–23 | | 90–92 | P2 P3 |
| 6 Aug | 20:00 | British Virgin Islands | 0–3 | Anguilla | 12–25 | 20–25 | 11–25 | | | 43–75 | P2 P3 |
| 7 Aug | 09:00 | Anguilla | 1–3 | Bermuda | 25–23 | 18–25 | 20–25 | 16–25 | | 79–98 | P2 P3 |
| 7 Aug | 11:00 | Sint Maarten | 3–1 | British Virgin Islands | 25–19 | 25–17 | 23–25 | 25–10 | | 98–71 | P2 P3 |

Play off
Third placed match

| Date | Time | | Score | | Set 1 | Set 2 | Set 3 | Set 4 | Set 5 | Total | Report |
|---|---|---|---|---|---|---|---|---|---|---|---|
| 7 Aug | 18:00 | Anguilla | 3–1 | British Virgin Islands | 25–11 | 28–30 | 25–11 | 25–12 | | 103–64 | P2 P3 |

First placed match

| Date | Time | | Score | | Set 1 | Set 2 | Set 3 | Set 4 | Set 5 | Total | Report |
|---|---|---|---|---|---|---|---|---|---|---|---|
| 7 Aug | 20:00 | Sint Maarten | 1–3 | Bermuda | 25–21 | 13–25 | 16–25 | 18–25 | | 72–96 | P2 P3 |

Standing

| Rank | Team |
|---|---|
| 1 | Bermuda |
| 2 | Sint Maarten |
| 3 | Anguilla |
| 4 | British Virgin Islands |

=== Group E ===
- Venue: YMCA Sports Complex, St. John's, Antigua and Barbuda
- Dates: 9–10 September 2016
- All times are Atlantic Standard Time (UTC−04:00)

| Pos | Team | Pld | W | L | Pts | SPW | SPL | SPR | SW | SL | SR |
|---|---|---|---|---|---|---|---|---|---|---|---|
| 1 | Antigua and Barbuda | 2 | 2 | 0 | 9 | 174 | 138 | 1.261 | 6 | 1 | 6.000 |
| 2 | Grenada | 2 | 1 | 1 | 6 | 162 | 153 | 1.059 | 4 | 3 | 1.333 |
| 3 | Saint Vincent and the Grenadines | 2 | 0 | 2 | 0 | 105 | 150 | 0.700 | 0 | 6 | 0.000 |

| Date | Time | | Score | | Set 1 | Set 2 | Set 3 | Set 4 | Set 5 | Total | Report |
|---|---|---|---|---|---|---|---|---|---|---|---|
| 9 Sep | 09:00 | Antigua and Barbuda | 3–1 | Grenada | 24–26 | 25–21 | 21–19 | 25–21 | | 95–87 | P2 P3 |
| 9 Sep | 11:00 | Saint Vincent and the Grenadines | 0–3 | Grenada | 16–25 | 19–25 | 19–25 | | | 54–75 | P2 P3 |
| 10 Sep | 18:00 | Antigua and Barbuda | 3–0 | Saint Vincent and the Grenadines | 25–19 | 25–11 | 25–21 | | | 75–51 | P2 P3 |

Play off
First placed match

| Date | Time | | Score | | Set 1 | Set 2 | Set 3 | Set 4 | Set 5 | Total | Report |
|---|---|---|---|---|---|---|---|---|---|---|---|
| 10 Sep | 20:00 | Antigua and Barbuda | 3–0 | Grenada | 25–13 | 25–13 | 27–25 | | | 77–51 | P2 P3 |

Standing

| Rank | Team |
|---|---|
| 1 | Antigua and Barbuda |
| 2 | Grenada |
| 3 | Saint Vincent and the Grenadines |

=== Group F ===
- Venue: (Collectivity of Saint Martin) Matthew François Sports Auditorium, Marigot, Saint Martin
- Dates: 22–23 October 2016
- All times are Atlantic Standard Time (UTC−04:00)

| Pos | Team | Pld | W | L | Pts | SPW | SPL | SPR | SW | SL | SR |
|---|---|---|---|---|---|---|---|---|---|---|---|
| 1 | Saint Martin | 3 | 3 | 0 | 14 | 245 | 171 | 1.433 | 9 | 1 | 9.000 |
| 2 | Saint Kitts and Nevis | 3 | 2 | 1 | 11 | 231 | 154 | 1.500 | 7 | 3 | 2.333 |
| 3 | Sint Eustatius | 3 | 1 | 2 | 5 | 181 | 189 | 0.958 | 3 | 6 | 0.500 |
| 4 | Saba | 3 | 0 | 3 | 0 | 82 | 225 | 0.364 | 0 | 9 | 0.000 |

| Date | Time | | Score | | Set 1 | Set 2 | Set 3 | Set 4 | Set 5 | Total | Report |
|---|---|---|---|---|---|---|---|---|---|---|---|
| 22 Oct | 09:00 | Saint Martin | 3–0 | Saba | 25–10 | 25–6 | 25–14 | | | 75–30 | P2 P3 |
| 22 Oct | 11:00 | Saint Kitts and Nevis | 3–0 | Sint Eustatius | 25–20 | 25–18 | 25–8 | | | 75–46 | P2 P3 |
| 22 Oct | 19:00 | Saba | 0–3 | Sint Eustatius | 10–25 | 15–25 | 14–25 | | | 39–75 | P2 P3 |
| 22 Oct | 21:00 | Saint Martin | 3–1 | Saint Kitts and Nevis | 25–18 | 20–25 | 25–19 | 25–19 | | 95–81 | P2 P3 |
| 23 Oct | 09:00 | Saba | 0–3 | Saint Kitts and Nevis | 5–25 | 5–25 | 3–25 | | | 13–75 | P2 P3 |
| 23 Oct | 11:00 | Saint Martin | 3–0 | Sint Eustatius | 25–22 | 25–18 | 25–20 | | | 75–60 | P2 P3 |

Play off
Third placed match

| Date | Time | | Score | | Set 1 | Set 2 | Set 3 | Set 4 | Set 5 | Total | Report |
|---|---|---|---|---|---|---|---|---|---|---|---|
| 30 Oct | 19:00 | Saba | 0–3 | Sint Eustatius | 14–25 | 11–25 | 6–25 | | | 31–75 | P2 P3 |

First placed match

| Date | Time | | Score | | Set 1 | Set 2 | Set 3 | Set 4 | Set 5 | Total | Report |
|---|---|---|---|---|---|---|---|---|---|---|---|
| 30 Oct | 21:00 | Saint Kitts and Nevis | 0–3 | Saint Martin | 22–25 | 23–25 | 24–26 | | | 69–76 | P2 P3 |

Standing

| Rank | Team |
|---|---|
| 1 | Saint Martin |
| 2 | Saint Kitts and Nevis |
| 3 | Sint Eustatius |
| 4 | Saba |

=== Group K ===
- Venue:, Nicaragua
- Dates: 30 November–4 December 2016
- All times are Central Standard Time (UTC−06:00)

| Pos | Team | Pld | W | L | Pts | SPW | SPL | SPR | SW | SL | SR | Qualification |
|---|---|---|---|---|---|---|---|---|---|---|---|---|
| 1 | Nicaragua | 4 | 4 | 0 | 19 | 322 | 247 | 1.304 | 12 | 1 | 12.000 | 2017 NORCECA Continental Championship |
| 2 | Guatemala | 4 | 3 | 1 | 13 | 309 | 283 | 1.092 | 9 | 5 | 1.800 | 2017 NORCECA Continental Championship |
| 3 | Panama | 4 | 2 | 2 | 10 | 316 | 323 | 0.978 | 7 | 7 | 1.000 | |
| 4 | El Salvador | 4 | 1 | 3 | 3 | 288 | 323 | 0.892 | 3 | 11 | 0.273 | |
| 5 | Honduras | 4 | 0 | 4 | 5 | 335 | 394 | 0.850 | 5 | 12 | 0.417 | |

| Date | Time | | Score | | Set 1 | Set 2 | Set 3 | Set 4 | Set 5 | Total | Report |
|---|---|---|---|---|---|---|---|---|---|---|---|
| 30 Nov | 17:00 | Panama | 3–0 | El Salvador | 25–23 | 25–21 | 25–23 | | | 75–67 | P2 P3 |
| 30 Nov | 19:30 | Guatemala | 3–2 | Honduras | 21–25 | 22–25 | 25–21 | 25–17 | 15–9 | 108–97 | P2 P3 |
| 1 Dec | 17:00 | El Salvador | 0–3 | Guatemala | 17–25 | 21–25 | 20–25 | | | 58–75 | P2 P3 |
| 1 Dec | 19:30 | Nicaragua | 3–1 | Panama | 25–20 | 20–25 | 27–25 | 25–16 | | 97–86 | P2 P3 |
| 2 Dec | 17:00 | Panama | 0–3 | Guatemala | 17–25 | 13–25 | 23–25 | | | 53–75 | P2 P3 |
| 2 Dec | 19:30 | Nicaragua | 3–0 | Honduras | 25–18 | 25–22 | 25–16 | | | 75–56 | P2 P3 |
| 3 Dec | 17:00 | Honduras | 2–3 | El Salvador | 25–20 | 21–25 | 26–24 | 18–25 | 8–15 | 98–109 | P2 P3 |
| 3 Dec | 19:30 | Guatemala | 0–3 | Nicaragua | 22–25 | 15–25 | 14–25 | | | 51–75 | P2 P3 |
| 4 Dec | 17:00 | Honduras | 1–3 | Panama | 29–27 | 13–25 | 19–25 | 23–25 | | 84–102 | P2 P3 |
| 4 Dec | 19:30 | El Salvador | 0–3 | Nicaragua | 10–25 | 22–25 | 22–25 | | | 54–75 | P2 P3 |

== Second round ==
=== 2017 CAZOVA Championship ===
==== Preliminary round ====
===== CAZOVA Pool D =====
- Venue: TBD, Jamaica
- Dates: 26–28 July 2017

| Pos | Team | Pld | W | L | Pts | SPW | SPL | SPR | SW | SL | SR | Qualification |
|---|---|---|---|---|---|---|---|---|---|---|---|---|
| 1 | Trinidad and Tobago | 3 | 3 | 0 | 15 | 225 | 133 | 1.692 | 9 | 0 | MAX | Semifinals |
| 2 | Martinique | 3 | 2 | 1 | 10 | 203 | 177 | 1.147 | 6 | 3 | 2.000 | Quarterfinals |
| 3 | Guadeloupe | 3 | 1 | 2 | 5 | 169 | 202 | 0.837 | 3 | 6 | 0.500 | Quarterfinals |
| 4 | Bahamas | 3 | 0 | 3 | 0 | 140 | 225 | 0.622 | 0 | 9 | 0.000 | 7th place match |

| Date | Time | | Score | | Set 1 | Set 2 | Set 3 | Set 4 | Set 5 | Total | Report |
|---|---|---|---|---|---|---|---|---|---|---|---|
| 26 July | 13:00 | Martinique | 3–0 | Bahamas | 25–15 | 25–19 | 25–13 | | | 75–47 | |
| 26 July | 18:00 | Trinidad and Tobago | 3–0 | Guadeloupe | 25–8 | 25–17 | 25–14 | | | 75–39 | |
| 27 July | 13:00 | Guadeloupe | 0–3 | Martinique | 23–25 | 19–25 | 13–25 | | | 55–75 | |
| 27 July | 18:00 | Trinidad and Tobago | 3–0 | Bahamas | 25–14 | 25–9 | 25–18 | | | 75–41 | |
| 28 July | 13:00 | Bahamas | 0–3 | Guadeloupe | 22–25 | 11–25 | 19–25 | | | 52–75 | |
| 28 July | 18:00 | Trinidad and Tobago | 3–0 | Martinique | 25–11 | 25–23 | 25–19 | | | 75–53 | |

===== CAZOVA Pool E =====
| Pos | Team | Pld | W | L | Pts | SPW | SPL | SPR | SW | SL | SR | Qualification |
|---|---|---|---|---|---|---|---|---|---|---|---|---|
| 1 | Jamaica | 3 | 3 | 0 | 14 | 249 | 202 | 1.233 | 9 | 1 | 9.000 | Semifinals |
| 2 | Curaçao | 3 | 2 | 1 | 6 | 286 | 278 | 1.029 | 6 | 7 | 0.857 | Quarterfinals |
| 3 | Suriname | 3 | 1 | 2 | 8 | 264 | 262 | 1.008 | 6 | 6 | 1.000 | Quarterfinals |
| 4 | U.S. Virgin Islands | 3 | 0 | 3 | 2 | 209 | 266 | 0.786 | 2 | 9 | 0.222 | 7th place match |

| Date | Time | | Score | | Set 1 | Set 2 | Set 3 | Set 4 | Set 5 | Total | Report |
|---|---|---|---|---|---|---|---|---|---|---|---|
| 26 July | 15:00 | Suriname | 2–3 | Curaçao | 25–19 | 19–25 | 25–21 | 19–25 | 11–15 | 99–105 | |
| 26 July | 20:00 | Jamaica | 3–0 | U.S. Virgin Islands | 25–16 | 25–18 | 25–17 | | | 75–51 | |
| 27 July | 15:00 | U.S. Virgin Islands | 0–3 | Suriname | 23–25 | 9–25 | 22–25 | | | 54–75 | |
| 27 July | 20:00 | Jamaica | 3–0 | Curaçao | 25–20 | 25–20 | 25–21 | | | 75–61 | |
| 28 July | 15:00 | Curaçao | 3–2 | U.S. Virgin Islands | 25–15 | 32–34 | 19–25 | 25–21 | 15–9 | 116–104 | |
| 28 July | 20:00 | Jamaica | 3–1 | Suriname | 25–21 | 23–25 | 26–24 | 25–20 | | 99–90 | |

==== Final round ====
===== 7th–8th places =====
====== 7th place match ======
| Date | Time | | Score | | Set 1 | Set 2 | Set 3 | Set 4 | Set 5 | Total | Report |
|---|---|---|---|---|---|---|---|---|---|---|---|
| 29 July | 15:00 | Bahamas | 1–3 | U.S. Virgin Islands | 25–20 | 13–25 | 16–25 | 18–25 | | 72–95 | |

===== Final six =====
Quarterfinals
29 July
Martinique | 1
Suriname | 3
29 July
Curaçao | 2
Guadeloupe | 3

Semifinals
30 July
Suriname | 1
Trinidad and Tobago | 3
30 July
Guadeloupe | 0
Jamaica | 3

Final
31 July
Trinidad and Tobago | 3
Jamaica | 0
3rd place match
31 July
Suriname | 3
Guadeloupe | 1

====== Quarterfinals ======
| Date | Time | | Score | | Set 1 | Set 2 | Set 3 | Set 4 | Set 5 | Total | Report |
|---|---|---|---|---|---|---|---|---|---|---|---|
| 29 July | 18:00 | Martinique | 1–3 | Suriname | 22–25 | 23–25 | 33–31 | 21–25 | | 99–106 | |
| 29 July | 20:00 | Curaçao | 2–3 | Guadeloupe | 25–15 | 18–25 | 25–21 | 22–25 | 12–15 | 102–101 | |

====== Semifinals ======
| Date | Time | | Score | | Set 1 | Set 2 | Set 3 | Set 4 | Set 5 | Total | Report |
|---|---|---|---|---|---|---|---|---|---|---|---|
| 30 July | 18:00 | Suriname | 1–3 | Trinidad and Tobago | 25–21 | 17–25 | 16–25 | 14–25 | | 72–96 | |
| 30 July | 20:00 | Guadeloupe | 0–3 | Jamaica | 18–25 | 12–25 | 19–25 | | | 49–75 | |

===== 5th place match =====
| Date | Time | | Score | | Set 1 | Set 2 | Set 3 | Set 4 | Set 5 | Total | Report |
|---|---|---|---|---|---|---|---|---|---|---|---|
| 30 July | 15:00 | Martinique | 0–3 | Curaçao | 19–25 | 20–25 | 21–25 | | | 60–75 | |

===== 3rd place match =====
| Date | Time | | Score | | Set 1 | Set 2 | Set 3 | Set 4 | Set 5 | Total | Report |
|---|---|---|---|---|---|---|---|---|---|---|---|
| 31 July | 16:00 | Suriname | 3–1 | Guadeloupe | 25–15 | 24–26 | 25–17 | 25–22 | | 99–80 | |

===== Final =====
| Date | Time | | Score | | Set 1 | Set 2 | Set 3 | Set 4 | Set 5 | Total | Report |
|---|---|---|---|---|---|---|---|---|---|---|---|
| 31 July | 18:00 | Trinidad and Tobago | 3–0 | Jamaica | 25–12 | 25–16 | 25–10 | | | 75–38 | |

==== Final standing ====
| Rank | Team |
|---|---|
| 1st place, gold medalist(s) | Trinidad and Tobago |
| 2nd place, silver medalist(s) | Jamaica |
| 3rd place, bronze medalist(s) | Suriname |
| 4 | Guadeloupe |
| 5 | Curaçao |
| 6 | Martinique |
| 7 | U.S. Virgin Islands |
| 8 | Bahamas |

| Qualified for the 2017 NORCECA Championship |

=== 2017 ECVA Championship ===
==== Preliminary round ====
| Qualified for the Semifinals |
| Qualified for the Quarterfinals |

===== ECVA Group D =====
- Venue: YMCA Sports Complex, Saint John's, Antigua and Barbuda
- Dates: September 7–10, 2017

| Pos | Team | Pld | W | L | Pts | SPW | SPL | SPR | SW | SL | SR |
|---|---|---|---|---|---|---|---|---|---|---|---|
| 1 | Antigua and Barbuda | 0 | 0 | 0 | 0 | 0 | 0 | — | 0 | 0 | — |
| 2 | Grenada | 0 | 0 | 0 | 0 | 0 | 0 | — | 0 | 0 | — |
| 3 | Saint Martin | 0 | 0 | 0 | 0 | 0 | 0 | — | 0 | 0 | — |

| Date | Time | | Score | | Set 1 | Set 2 | Set 3 | Set 4 | Set 5 | Total | Report |
|---|---|---|---|---|---|---|---|---|---|---|---|
| 7 Sept | 11:00 | Saint Martin | – | Grenada | – | – | – | | | 0–0 | |
| 7 Sept | 21:00 | Antigua and Barbuda | – | Grenada | – | – | – | | | 0–0 | |
| 8 Sept | 20:00 | Antigua and Barbuda | – | Saint Martin | – | – | – | | | 0–0 | |

===== ECVA Group E =====
- Venue: YMCA Sports Complex, Saint John's, Antigua and Barbuda
- Dates: September 7–10, 2017

| Pos | Team | Pld | W | L | Pts | SPW | SPL | SPR | SW | SL | SR |
|---|---|---|---|---|---|---|---|---|---|---|---|
| 1 | Dominica | 0 | 0 | 0 | 0 | 0 | 0 | — | 0 | 0 | — |
| 2 | Saint Kitts and Nevis | 0 | 0 | 0 | 0 | 0 | 0 | — | 0 | 0 | — |
| 3 | Sint Maarten | 0 | 0 | 0 | 0 | 0 | 0 | — | 0 | 0 | — |

| Date | Time | | Score | | Set 1 | Set 2 | Set 3 | Set 4 | Set 5 | Total | Report |
|---|---|---|---|---|---|---|---|---|---|---|---|
| 7 Sept | 9:00 | Dominica | – | Saint Kitts and Nevis | – | – | – | | | 0–0 | |
| 7 Sept | 19:00 | Sint Maarten | – | Saint Kitts and Nevis | – | – | – | | | 0–0 | |
| 8 Sept | 18:00 | Dominica | – | Sint Maarten | – | – | – | | | 0–0 | |

==== Final round ====
===== Final six =====
Quarterfinals
0
0
0
0

Semifinals
0
0
0
0

Final
0
0
3rd place match
0
0

====== Quarterfinals ======
| Date | Time | | Score | | Set 1 | Set 2 | Set 3 | Set 4 | Set 5 | Total | Report |
|---|---|---|---|---|---|---|---|---|---|---|---|
| 9 Sept | 9:00 | D2 | – | E3 | – | – | – | | | 0–0 | |
| 9 Sept | 11:00 | E2 | – | D3 | – | – | – | | | 0–0 | |

====== Semifinals ======
| Date | Time | | Score | Set 1 | Set 2 | Set 3 | Set 4 | Set 5 | Total | Report |
|---|---|---|---|---|---|---|---|---|---|---|
| 9 Sept | 19:00 | D1 | – | – | – | – | | | 0–0 | |
| 9 Sept | 21:00 | E1 | – | – | – | – | | | 0–0 | |

===== 5th place match =====
| Date | Time | Score | Set 1 | Set 2 | Set 3 | Set 4 | Set 5 | Total | Report |
|---|---|---|---|---|---|---|---|---|---|
| 10 Sept | 17:00 | – | – | – | – | | | 0–0 | |

===== 3rd place =====
| Date | Time | Score | Set 1 | Set 2 | Set 3 | Set 4 | Set 5 | Total | Report |
|---|---|---|---|---|---|---|---|---|---|
| 10 Sept | 19:00 | – | – | – | – | | | 0–0 | |

===== 1st place =====
| Date | Time | Score | Set 1 | Set 2 | Set 3 | Set 4 | Set 5 | Total | Report |
|---|---|---|---|---|---|---|---|---|---|
| 10 Sept | 21:00 | – | – | – | – | | | 0–0 | |

==== Final standing ====
| Rank | Team |
|---|---|
| 1st place, gold medalist(s) | |
| 2nd place, silver medalist(s) | |
| 3rd place, bronze medalist(s) | |
| 4 | |
| 5 | |
| 6 | |

| Qualified for the 2017 NORCECA Championship |

== NORCECA Continental Championship ==
| Qualified for the 2018 World Championship |

=== Pool A ===
| Rank | Team |
|---|---|
| 1 | Dominican Republic |
| 2 | Puerto Rico |
| 3 | Guatemala |
| 4 | Jamaica |

=== Pool B ===
| Rank | Team |
|---|---|
| 1 | Canada |
| 2 | Cuba |
| 3 | Nicaragua |
| 4 | Saint Lucia |

=== Pool C ===
| Rank | Team |
|---|---|
| 1 | Mexico |
| 2 | Trinidad and Tobago |
| 3 | Costa Rica |
| 4 | Dominica |
