= 2010 FIVB Women's Volleyball World Championship qualification (NORCECA) =

The NORCECA qualification for the 2010 FIVB Women's Volleyball World Championship saw member nations compete for six places at the finals in Japan.

== Draw ==
32 of the 35 NORCECA national teams entered qualification. The teams were distributed according to their position in the FIVB Senior Women's Rankings as of 5 January 2008 using the serpentine system for their distribution. (Rankings shown in brackets) Teams ranked 1–7 did not compete in the first and second rounds, and automatically qualified for the third round.

First round

Pool A (ECVA)	Pool B (ECVA)
Dominica (54); British Virgin Islands (74); Saint Kitts and Nevis (74); Bermuda (—); Anguilla (84)	Antigua and Barbuda (—); Grenada (—); Saint Lucia (—); Saint Vincent and the Grenadines (—)

Second round

Pool C (CAZOVA)	Pool D (CAZOVA)	Pool E (AFECAVOL)
Netherlands Antilles (54); Trinidad and Tobago (70); Aruba (—); Suriname (—); U.S. Virgin Islands (—); 1st Pool A	Barbados (51); Jamaica (51); Cayman Islands (84); Bahamas (—); Haiti (—); 1st Pool B	Panama (84); Guatemala (48); Belize (—); El Salvador (—); Nicaragua (54); Honduras (74)

Third round

Pool F	Pool G	Pool H	Pool I
Cuba (3); 1st Pool C 1st Pool E 2nd Pool E	United States (4); Costa Rica (30); 1st Pool D 2nd Pool C	Dominican Republic (14); Mexico (25); 3rd Pool C 3rd Pool E	Puerto Rico (19); Canada (24); 2nd Pool D 3rd Pool D

Playoff round

Pool J

2nd Pool F
2nd Pool G
2nd Pool H
2nd Pool I

== First round ==
=== Pool A ===
- Venue: (Collectivity of Saint Martin) Omnisports Hall, Marigot, Saint Martin
- Dates: April 15–19, 2009
- All times are Atlantic Standard Time (UTC−04:00)

Pos	Team	Pld	W	L	Pts	SW	SL	SR	SPW	SPL	SPR
1	Bermuda	4	4	0	8	12	0	MAX	300	178	1.685
2	Saint Kitts and Nevis	4	2	2	6	7	6	1.167	290	253	1.146
3	Dominica	4	2	2	6	6	7	0.857	281	267	1.052
4	Anguilla	4	2	2	6	7	7	1.000	302	304	0.993
5	British Virgin Islands	4	0	4	4	0	12	0.000	129	300	0.430

Date	Time		Score		Set 1	Set 2	Set 3	Set 4	Set 5	Total	Report
15 Apr	19:00	Dominica	0–3	Bermuda	15–25	21–25	18–25			54–75	P2 P3
15 Apr	21:00	British Virgin Islands	0–3	Saint Kitts and Nevis	10–25	13–25	9–25			32–75	P2 P3
16 Apr	17:00	Anguilla	1–3	Dominica	21–25	25–23	16–25	25–27		87–100	P2 P3
16 Apr	19:00	Saint Kitts and Nevis	0–3	Bermuda	14–25	17–25	18–25			49–75	P2 P3
17 Apr	17:00	Saint Kitts and Nevis	1–3	Anguilla	20–25	25–18	24–26	22–25		91–94	P2 P3
17 Apr	19:00	British Virgin Islands	0–3	Bermuda	5–25	9–25	15–25			29–75	P2 P3
18 Apr	17:00	Anguilla	3–0	British Virgin Islands	25–11	25–16	25–11			75–38	P2 P3
18 Mar	19:00	Saint Kitts and Nevis	3–0	Dominica	25–15	25–21	25–16			75–52	P2 P3
19 Apr	16:00	Anguilla	0–3	Bermuda	10–25	18–25	18–25			46–75	P2 P3
19 Apr	18:00	British Virgin Islands	0–3	Dominica	10–25	15–25	5–25			30–75	P2 P3

=== Pool B ===
- Venue: Beausejour Indoor Stadium, Gros Islet, Saint Lucia
- Dates: March 27–29, 2009
- All times are Atlantic Standard Time (UTC−04:00)

Pos	Team	Pld	W	L	Pts	SW	SL	SR	SPW	SPL	SPR
1	Saint Lucia	3	3	0	6	9	1	9.000	251	153	1.641
2	Antigua and Barbuda	3	2	1	5	7	3	2.333	216	171	1.263
3	Saint Vincent and the Grenadines	3	1	2	4	3	6	0.500	158	211	0.749
4	Grenada	3	0	3	3	0	9	0.000	135	225	0.600

Date	Time		Score		Set 1	Set 2	Set 3	Set 4	Set 5	Total	Report
27 Mar	18:00	Antigua and Barbuda	3–0	St. Vincent & the Grenadines	25–12	25–15	25–7			75–34	P2 P3
27 Mar	20:00	Saint Lucia	3–0	Grenada	25–15	25–14	25–9			75–38	P2 P3
28 Mar	18:00	Grenada	0–3	Antigua and Barbuda	13–25	13–25	14–25			40–75	P2 P3
28 Mar	20:00	St. Vincent & the Grenadines	0–3	Saint Lucia	27–29	8–25	14–25			49–79	P2 P3
29 Mar	17:00	Grenada	0–3	St. Vincent & the Grenadines	21–25	23–25	13–25			57–75	P2 P3
29 Mar	19:00	Saint Lucia	3–1	Antigua and Barbuda	22–25	25–13	25–15	25–13		97–66	P2 P3

== Second round ==
=== Pool C ===
- Venue: UWI Sport & Physical Education Centre, Port of Spain, Trinidad and Tobago
- Dates: June 2–6, 2009
- All times are Atlantic Standard Time (UTC−04:00)

==== Preliminary round ====
===== Group A =====
Pos	Team	Pld	W	L	Pts	SW	SL	SR	SPW	SPL	SPR
1	Trinidad and Tobago	2	2	0	4	6	0	MAX	150	72	2.083
2	U.S. Virgin Islands	2	1	1	3	3	3	1.000	122	132	0.924
3	Aruba	2	0	2	2	0	6	0.000	86	154	0.558

Date	Time		Score		Set 1	Set 2	Set 3	Set 4	Set 5	Total	Report
02 Jun	15:00	Aruba	0–3	U.S. Virgin Islands	19–25	27–29	11–25			57–79	P2 P3
03 Jun	20:00	Trinidad and Tobago	3–0	U.S. Virgin Islands	25–23	25–12	25–8			75–43	P2 P3
04 Jun	20:00	Trinidad and Tobago	3–0	Aruba	25–12	25–8	25–9			75–29	P2 P3

===== Group B =====
Pos	Team	Pld	W	L	Pts	SW	SL	SR	SPW	SPL	SPR
1	Netherlands Antilles	2	2	0	4	6	3	2.000	210	191	1.099
2	Bermuda	2	1	1	3	5	3	1.667	185	171	1.082
3	Suriname	2	0	2	2	1	6	0.167	143	176	0.813

Date	Time		Score		Set 1	Set 2	Set 3	Set 4	Set 5	Total	Report
02 Jun	13:00	Suriname	0–3	Bermuda	18–25	22–25	22–25			62–75	P2 P3
03 Jun	18:00	Netherlands Antilles	3–1	Suriname	26–28	25–16	25–20	25–17		101–81	P2 P3
04 Jun	13:00	Netherlands Antilles	3–2	Bermuda	25–21	20–25	21–25	28–26	15–13	109–110	P2 P3

==== Final round ====
===== Semifinals =====
Date	Time		Score		Set 1	Set 2	Set 3	Set 4	Set 5	Total	Report
05 Jun	13:00	U.S. Virgin Islands	2–3	Netherlands Antilles	14–25	25–20	25–21	23–25	10–15	97–106	P2 P3
05 Jun	18:00	Trinidad and Tobago	3–0	Bermuda	25–16	25–11	25–12			75–39	P2 P3

===== 5th place =====
Date	Time		Score		Set 1	Set 2	Set 3	Set 4	Set 5	Total	Report
06 Jun	10:00	Aruba	0–3	Suriname	10–25	20–25	13–25			43–75	P2 P3

===== 3rd place =====
Date	Time		Score		Set 1	Set 2	Set 3	Set 4	Set 5	Total	Report
06 Jun	16:00	U.S. Virgin Islands	3–2	Bermuda	27–25	25–21	13–25	10–25	15–6	90–102	P2 P3

===== Final =====
Date	Time		Score		Set 1	Set 2	Set 3	Set 4	Set 5	Total	Report
06 Jun	20:00	Netherlands Antilles	0–3	Trinidad and Tobago	16–25	15–25	11–25			42–75	P2 P3

==== Final standing ====
Rank	Team
1	Trinidad and Tobago
2	Netherlands Antilles
3	U.S. Virgin Islands
4	Bermuda
5	Suriname
6	Aruba

=== Pool D ===
- Venue: Garfield Sobers Gymnasium, Bridgetown, Barbados
- Dates: June 10–14, 2009
- All times are Atlantic Standard Time (UTC−04:00)

==== Preliminary round ====
===== Group A =====
Pos	Team	Pld	W	L	Pts	SW	SL	SR	SPW	SPL	SPR
1	Barbados	2	2	0	4	6	2	3.000	187	151	1.238
2	Bahamas	2	1	1	3	5	5	1.000	208	216	0.963
3	Haiti	2	0	2	2	2	6	0.333	157	185	0.849

Date	Time		Score		Set 1	Set 2	Set 3	Set 4	Set 5	Total	Report
10 Jun	20:30	Barbados	3–0	Haiti	25–14	26–24	25–14			76–52	P2 P3
11 Jun	18:30	Bahamas	3–2	Haiti	25–23	25–21	22–25	22–25	15–11	109–105	P2 P3
12 Jun	20:30	Barbados	3–2	Bahamas	22–25	25–18	26–24	23–25	15–7	111–99	P2 P3

===== Group B =====
Pos	Team	Pld	W	L	Pts	SW	SL	SR	SPW	SPL	SPR
1	Jamaica	2	2	0	4	6	0	MAX	150	100	1.500
2	Saint Lucia	2	1	1	3	3	3	1.000	134	130	1.031
3	Cayman Islands	2	0	2	2	0	6	0.000	96	150	0.640

Date	Time		Score		Set 1	Set 2	Set 3	Set 4	Set 5	Total	Report
10 Jun	18:30	Jamaica	3–0	Saint Lucia	25–15	25–23	25–21			75–59	P2 P3
11 Jun	20:30	Cayman Islands	0–3	Saint Lucia	17–25	15–25	23–25			55–75	P2 P3
12 Jun	18:30	Jamaica	3–0	Cayman Islands	25–7	25–19	25–15			75–41	P2 P3

==== Final round ====
===== Semifinals =====
Date	Time		Score		Set 1	Set 2	Set 3	Set 4	Set 5	Total	Report
13 Jun	20:00	Jamaica	3–0	Bahamas	25–23	25–9	25–13			75–45	P2 P3
13 Jun	22:00	Barbados	3–2	Saint Lucia	25–15	21–25	25–27	25–19	18–16	114–102	P2 P3

===== 5th place =====
Date	Time		Score		Set 1	Set 2	Set 3	Set 4	Set 5	Total	Report
13 Jun	17:00	Haiti	3–0	Cayman Islands	25–18	25–21	25–9			75–48	P2 P3

===== 3rd place =====
Date	Time		Score		Set 1	Set 2	Set 3	Set 4	Set 5	Total	Report
14 Jun	17:00	Bahamas	3–0	Saint Lucia	26–24	25–14	25–21			76–59	P2 P3

===== Final =====
Date	Time		Score		Set 1	Set 2	Set 3	Set 4	Set 5	Total	Report
14 Jun	19:30	Jamaica	2–3	Barbados	14–25	23–25	25–22	25–23	8–15	95–110	P2 P3

==== Final standing ====
Rank	Team
1	Barbados
2	Jamaica
3	Bahamas
4	Saint Lucia
5	Haiti
6	Cayman Islands

=== Pool E ===
- Venue: Gimnasio del Polideportivo España, Managua, Nicaragua
- Dates: December 9–13, 2008
- All times are Central Standard Time (UTC−06:00)

Pos	Team	Pld	W	L	Pts	SW	SL	SR	SPW	SPL	SPR
1	Guatemala	5	5	0	10	15	1	15.000	387	283	1.367
2	Nicaragua	5	4	1	9	13	3	4.333	390	252	1.548
3	Panama	5	3	2	8	9	7	1.286	347	335	1.036
4	El Salvador	5	2	3	7	6	9	0.667	307	338	0.908
5	Honduras	5	1	4	6	4	13	0.308	306	405	0.756
6	Belize	5	0	5	5	1	15	0.067	270	394	0.685

Date	Time		Score		Set 1	Set 2	Set 3	Set 4	Set 5	Total	Report
09 Dec	14:00	Guatemala	3–0	Honduras	25–12	25–11	25–15			75–38	P2 P3
09 Dec	16:00	Belize	0–3	El Salvador	17–25	16–25	20–25			53–75	P2 P3
09 Dec	19:00	Panama	0–3	Nicaragua	22–25	14–25	9–25			45–75	P2 P3
10 Dec	15:00	Honduras	0–3	El Salvador	18–25	19–25	22–25			59–75	P2 P3
10 Dec	17:00	Guatemala	3–0	Panama	25–20	25–21	25–11			75–52	P2 P3
10 Dec	19:00	Nicaragua	3–0	Belize	25–15	25–13	25–10			75–38	P2 P3
11 Dec	15:00	Belize	0–3	Guatemala	13–25	16–25	19–25			48–75	P2 P3
11 Dec	17:00	Panama	3–1	Honduras	25–21	24–26	25–20	25–11		99–78	P2 P3
11 Dec	19:00	El Salvador	0–3	Nicaragua	18–25	9–25	18–25			45–75	P2 P3
12 Dec	15:00	Panama	3–0	Belize	25–19	25–18	25–13			75–50	P2 P3
12 Dec	17:00	Guatemala	3–0	El Salvador	25–14	25–23	25–18			75–55	P2 P3
12 Dec	19:00	Honduras	0–3	Nicaragua	12–25	12–25	13–25			37–75	P2 P3
13 Dec	15:00	El Salvador	0–3	Panama	14–25	24–26	19–25			57–76	P2 P3
13 Dec	17:00	Belize	1–3	Honduras	25–18	24–26	16–25	16–25		81–94	P2 P3
13 Dec	19:00	Nicaragua	1–3	Guatemala	25–11	20–25	24–26	21–25		90–87	P2 P3

== Third round ==
=== Pool F ===
- Venue: Coliseo de la Ciudad Deportiva, Havana, Cuba
- Dates: June 21–23, 2009
- All times are Cuba Daylight Time (UTC−04:00)

Pos	Team	Pld	W	L	Pts	SW	SL	SR	SPW	SPL	SPR
1	Cuba	3	3	0	6	9	0	MAX	225	125	1.800
2	Trinidad and Tobago	3	2	1	5	6	4	1.500	220	204	1.078
3	Nicaragua	3	1	2	4	4	7	0.571	211	247	0.854
4	Guatemala	3	0	3	3	1	9	0.111	169	249	0.679

Date	Time		Score		Set 1	Set 2	Set 3	Set 4	Set 5	Total	Report
21 Jun	15:00	Trinidad and Tobago	3–0	Guatemala	25–22	25–21	25–12			75–55	P2 P3
21 Jun	17:45	Cuba	3–0	Nicaragua	25–9	25–13	25–16			75–38	P2 P3
22 Jun	15:00	Guatemala	1–3	Nicaragua	26–24	16–25	16–25	15–25		73–99	P2 P3
22 Jun	17:45	Trinidad and Tobago	0–3	Cuba	16–25	17–25	13–25			46–75	P2 P3
23 Jun	15:00	Nicaragua	1–3	Trinidad and Tobago	16–25	10–25	26–24	22–25		74–99	P2 P3
23 Jun	17:45	Cuba	3–0	Guatemala	25–6	25–15	25–20			75–41	P2 P3

=== Pool G ===
- Venue: UCF Arena, Orlando, United States
- Dates: July 6–8, 2009
- All times are Eastern Daylight Time (UTC−04:00)

Pos	Team	Pld	W	L	Pts	SW	SL	SR	SPW	SPL	SPR
1	United States	3	3	0	6	9	0	MAX	225	92	2.446
2	Costa Rica	3	2	1	5	6	3	2.000	189	176	1.074
3	Barbados	3	0	3	3	2	9	0.222	193	259	0.745
4	Netherlands Antilles	3	1	2	4	3	8	0.375	181	261	0.693

Date	Time		Score		Set 1	Set 2	Set 3	Set 4	Set 5	Total	Report
06 Jul	17:00	Costa Rica	3–0	Barbados	25–17	25–19	25–17			75–53	P2 P3
06 Jul	19:30	United States	3–0	Netherlands Antilles	25–10	25–9	25–5			75–24	P2 P3
07 Jul	17:00	Netherlands Antilles	0–3	Costa Rica	16–25	9–25	23–25			48–75	P2 P3
07 Jul	19:30	Barbados	0–3	United States	6–25	11–25	12–25			29–75	P2 P3
08 Jul	17:00	Barbados	2–3	Netherlands Antilles	22–25	25–20	25–27	25–21	14–16	111–109	P2 P3
08 Jul	19:30	United States	3–0	Costa Rica	25–15	25–9	25–15			75–39	P2 P3

=== Pool H ===
- Venue: Gran Arena del Cibao, Santiago de los Caballeros, Dominican Republic
- Dates: June 12–14, 2009
- All times are Atlantic Standard Time (UTC−04:00)

Pos	Team	Pld	W	L	Pts	SW	SL	SR	SPW	SPL	SPR
1	Dominican Republic	3	3	0	6	9	0	MAX	225	103	2.184
2	Mexico	3	2	1	5	6	4	1.500	207	191	1.084
3	U.S. Virgin Islands	3	1	2	4	3	8	0.375	174	257	0.677
4	Panama	3	0	3	3	3	9	0.333	208	263	0.791

Date	Time		Score		Set 1	Set 2	Set 3	Set 4	Set 5	Total	Report
12 Jun	18:00	Mexico	3–1	Panama	25–15	25–13	17–25	25–20		92–73	P2 P3
12 Jun	20:00	Dominican Republic	3–0	U.S. Virgin Islands	25–14	25–10	25–11			75–35	P2 P3
13 Jun	18:00	U.S. Virgin Islands	0–3	Mexico	11–25	19–25	13–25			43–75	P2 P3
13 Jun	20:00	Panama	0–3	Dominican Republic	11–25	8–25	9–25			28–75	P2 P3
14 Jun	17:00	U.S. Virgin Islands	3–2	Panama	25–22	25–22	16–25	15–25	15–13	96–107	P2 P3
14 Jun	19:00	Dominican Republic	3–0	Mexico	25–12	25–10	25–18			75–40	P2 P3

=== Pool I ===
- Venue: Coliseo Héctor Solá Bezares, Caguas, Puerto Rico
- Dates: July 7–9, 2009
- All times are Atlantic Standard Time (UTC−04:00)

Pos	Team	Pld	W	L	Pts	SW	SL	SR	SPW	SPL	SPR
1	Puerto Rico	3	3	0	6	9	0	MAX	225	133	1.692
2	Canada	3	2	1	5	6	3	2.000	209	151	1.384
3	Jamaica	3	1	2	4	3	6	0.500	169	219	0.772
4	Bahamas	3	0	3	3	0	9	0.000	125	225	0.556

Date	Time		Score		Set 1	Set 2	Set 3	Set 4	Set 5	Total	Report
07 Jul	18:30	Canada	3–0	Jamaica	26–24	25–17	25–10			76–51	P2 P3
07 Jul	20:30	Puerto Rico	3–0	Bahamas	25–15	25–7	25–10			75–32	P2 P3
08 Jul	14:00	Bahamas	0–3	Canada	12–25	4–25	9–25			25–75	P2 P3
08 Jul	18:00	Jamaica	0–3	Puerto Rico	18–25	16–25	9–25			43–75	P2 P3
09 Jul	16:00	Bahamas	0–3	Jamaica	23–25	22–25	23–25			68–75	P2 P3
09 Jul	20:00	Puerto Rico	3–0	Canada	25–21	25–19	25–18			75–58	P2 P3

== Playoff round ==
=== Pool J ===
- Venue: High Performance Sports Center of Baja California, Tijuana, Mexico
- Dates: August 28–30, 2009
- All times are Pacific Daylight Time (UTC−07:00)

Pos	Team	Pld	W	L	Pts	SW	SL	SR	SPW	SPL	SPR
1	Canada	3	3	0	6	9	2	4.500	257	207	1.242
2	Costa Rica	3	2	1	5	6	4	1.500	231	211	1.095
3	Mexico	3	1	2	4	6	6	1.000	253	262	0.966
4	Trinidad and Tobago	3	0	3	3	0	9	0.000	164	225	0.729

Date	Time		Score		Set 1	Set 2	Set 3	Set 4	Set 5	Total	Report
28 Aug	17:00	Canada	3–0	Costa Rica	25–18	25–19	25–22			75–59	P2 P3
28 Aug	20:00	Mexico	3–0	Trinidad and Tobago	25–21	25–15	25–22			75–58	P2 P3
29 Aug	17:00	Trinidad and Tobago	0–3	Canada	14–25	20–25	21–25			55–75	P2 P3
29 Aug	19:00	Costa Rica	3–1	Mexico	25–21	25–21	22–25	25–18		97–85	P2 P3
30 Aug	12:00	Costa Rica	3–0	Trinidad and Tobago	25–16	25–17	25–18			75–51	P2 P3
30 Aug	14:00	Mexico	2–3	Canada	13–25	22–25	25–22	25–20	8–15	93–107	P2 P3
