= 2014 FIVB Women's Volleyball World Championship qualification (NORCECA) =

The NORCECA qualification for the 2014 FIVB Women's Volleyball World Championship saw member nations compete for six places at the finals in Italy.

== Draw ==
40 of the 41 NORCECA national teams entered qualification (Montserrat and Turks and Caicos Islands later withdrew). The teams were distributed according to their position in the NORCECA Senior Women's Confederation Rankings as of 15 January 2012 using the serpentine system for their distribution. (Rankings shown in brackets) Teams ranked 1–7 do not compete in the first and second rounds, and automatically qualify for the third rounds.

First round (AFECAVOL)

Pool G	Pool H
Panama (9); El Salvador (19); Belize (20); Bonaire (—)	Nicaragua (10); Guatemala (15); Honduras (23); ~~Turks and Caicos Islands (—)~~

First round (CAZOVA)

Pool A	Pool C	Pool E
Trinidad and Tobago (8); Suriname (16); Bahamas (18); Guadeloupe (—)	U.S. Virgin Islands (11); Curaçao (14); Haiti (29); Martinique (—)	Jamaica (12); Barbados (13); Aruba (30); Cayman Islands (31)

First round (ECVA)

Pool B	Pool D	Pool F
Saint Lucia (17); Grenada (26); Saint Vincent and the Grenadines (27); Sint Eustatius (—); Sint Maarten (—)	Saint Kitts and Nevis (21); Anguilla (25); Bermuda (28); ~~Montserrat (—)~~	Dominica (22); Antigua and Barbuda (24); British Virgin Islands (32); Saint Martin (33)

- Montserrat withdrew and Sint Maarten replaced Montserrat in Pool D to balance the number of teams in each group.

Second round

Pool I	Pool J	Pool K
1st Pool A 2nd Pool D 2nd Pool E 3rd Pool H	1st Pool B 2nd Pool C 2nd Pool F 3rd Pool G	1st Pool C 2nd Pool B 2nd Pool G 3rd Pool F
Pool L	Pool M	Pool N
1st Pool D 2nd Pool A 2nd Pool H 3rd Pool E	1st Pool E 1st Pool H 3rd Pool A 3rd Pool D	1st Pool F 1st Pool G 3rd Pool B 3rd Pool C

Third round

The twenty remaining teams were distributed according to their position in second round and then in the NORCECA Senior Women's Confederation Rankings as of January 2014 using the serpentine system for their distribution. (Positions in second round and NORCECA rankings shown in brackets)

Pool O	Pool P	Pool Q
United States (Seeded – 1); Guatemala (1st – 14); Panama (1st – 15); Honduras (3rd – 18)	Dominican Republic (Seeded – 2); Nicaragua (1st – 10); El Salvador (1st – 17); Guadeloupe (2nd – 32)	Cuba (Seeded – 3); Trinidad and Tobago (1st – 8); Curaçao (1st – 26); Haiti (2nd – 27)
Pool R	Pool S	
Puerto Rico (Seeded – 4); Costa Rica (Seeded – 7); Saint Lucia (2nd – 9); Barbados (2nd – 13)	Canada (Seeded – 5); Mexico (Seeded – 6); U.S. Virgin Islands (2nd – 11); Jamaica (2nd – 12)	

Final round

2nd Pool O
2nd Pool P
2nd Pool Q
2nd Pool R
2nd Pool S

== First round ==
=== Pool A ===
- Venue: Ismay van Wilgen Sports Hall, Paramaribo, Suriname
- Dates: September 1–2, 2012
- All times are Suriname Time (UTC−03:00)

==== Preliminary round ====
Pos	Team	Pld	W	L	Pts	SPW	SPL	SPR	SW	SL	SR
1	Trinidad and Tobago	3	3	0	13	267	186	1.435	9	2	4.500
2	Guadeloupe	3	2	1	7	232	251	0.924	6	6	1.000
3	Suriname	3	1	2	8	239	245	0.976	6	6	1.000
4	Bahamas	3	0	3	2	206	262	0.786	2	9	0.222

Date	Time		Score		Set 1	Set 2	Set 3	Set 4	Set 5	Total	Report
01 Sep	09:00	Trinidad and Tobago	3–1	Bahamas	25–20	25–15	21–15	25–15		96–65	P2 P3
01 Sep	11:00	Suriname	2–3	Guadeloupe	25–18	25–14	17–25	22–25	8–15	97–97	P2 P3
01 Sep	18:00	Trinidad and Tobago	3–0	Guadeloupe	25–17	25–14	25–13			75–44	P2 P3
01 Sep	20:00	Suriname	3–0	Bahamas	25–22	25–15	25–15			75–52	P2 P3
02 Sep	09:00	Bahamas	1–3	Guadeloupe	25–16	21–25	15–25	18–25		79–91	P2 P3
02 Sep	11:00	Suriname	1–3	Trinidad and Tobago	19–25	25–21	17–25	6–25		67–96	P2 P3

==== Final round ====
===== 3rd place =====
Date	Time		Score		Set 1	Set 2	Set 3	Set 4	Set 5	Total	Report
02 Sep	18:00	Suriname	3–0	Bahamas	25–23	25–19	25–18			75–60	P2 P3

===== Final =====
Date	Time		Score		Set 1	Set 2	Set 3	Set 4	Set 5	Total	Report
02 Sep	20:00	Trinidad and Tobago	3–0	Guadeloupe	25–6	25–14	25–13			75–33	P2 P3

==== Final standing ====
Rank	Team
1	Trinidad and Tobago
2	Guadeloupe
3	Suriname
4	Bahamas

=== Pool B ===
- Venue: La Borie Indoor Stadium, St. George's, Grenada
- Dates: June 22–23, 2012
- All times are Atlantic Standard Time (UTC−04:00)

==== Preliminary round ====
Pos	Team	Pld	W	L	Pts	SPW	SPL	SPR	SW	SL	SR
1	Saint Lucia	3	3	0	14	238	184	1.293	9	1	9.000
2	Saint Vincent and the Grenadines	3	2	1	8	233	224	1.040	6	5	1.200
3	Grenada	3	1	2	6	295	295	1.000	6	8	0.750
4	Sint Eustatius	3	0	3	2	199	262	0.760	2	9	0.222

Date	Time		Score		Set 1	Set 2	Set 3	Set 4	Set 5	Total	Report
22 Jun	09:00	Grenada	3–2	Sint Eustatius	25–13	25–20	20–25	23–25	19–17	112–100	P2 P3
22 Jun	11:00	Saint Lucia	3–0	St. Vincent & the Grenadines	25–19	25–16	25–16			75–51	P2 P3
22 Jun	18:00	Saint Lucia	3–0	Sint Eustatius	25–16	25–18	25–11			75–45	P2 P3
22 Jun	20:00	Grenada	2–3	St. Vincent & the Grenadines	25–20	18–25	19–25	25–22	8–15	95–107	P2 P3
23 Jun	09:00	St. Vincent & the Grenadines	3–0	Sint Eustatius	25–15	25–17	25–22			75–54	P2 P3
23 Jun	11:00	Grenada	1–3	Saint Lucia	23–25	17–25	25–13	23–25		88–88	P2 P3

==== Final round ====
===== 3rd place =====
Date	Time		Score		Set 1	Set 2	Set 3	Set 4	Set 5	Total	Report
23 Jun	18:00	Grenada	3–0	Sint Eustatius	25–12	25–22	25–21			75–55	P2 P3

===== Final =====
Date	Time		Score		Set 1	Set 2	Set 3	Set 4	Set 5	Total	Report
23 Jun	20:00	Saint Lucia	3–0	St. Vincent & the Grenadines	25–21	25–17	25–15			75–53	P2 P3

==== Final standing ====
Rank	Team
1	Saint Lucia
2	St. Vincent & the Grenadines
3	Grenada
4	Sint Eustatius

=== Pool C ===
- Venue: (United States Virgin Islands) Ronald Charles Basketball Arena, Saint Croix, U.S. Virgin Islands
- Dates: May 26–27, 2012
- All times are Atlantic Standard Time (UTC−04:00)

==== Preliminary round ====
Pos	Team	Pld	W	L	Pts	SPW	SPL	SPR	SW	SL	SR
1	U.S. Virgin Islands	3	3	0	14	245	196	1.250	9	1	9.000
2	Curaçao	3	2	1	9	227	213	1.066	6	4	1.500
3	Haiti	3	1	2	6	214	231	0.926	4	6	0.667
4	Martinique	3	0	3	1	200	246	0.813	1	9	0.111

Date	Time		Score		Set 1	Set 2	Set 3	Set 4	Set 5	Total	Report
26 May	09:00	Martinique	0–3	Haiti	13–25	22–25	24–26			59–76	P2 P3
26 May	11:00	U.S. Virgin Islands	3–0	Curaçao	25–23	25–20	25–12			75–55	P2 P3
26 May	18:00	Curaçao	3–0	Martinique	25–19	25–21	25–21			75–61	P2 P3
26 May	20:00	U.S. Virgin Islands	3–0	Haiti	25–21	25–17	25–23			75–61	P2 P3
27 May	09:00	Haiti	1–3	Curaçao	25–22	19–25	15–25	18–25		77–97	P2 P3
27 May	11:00	U.S. Virgin Islands	3–1	Martinique	25–17	20–25	25–20	25–18		95–80	P2 P3

==== Final round ====
===== 3rd place =====
Date	Time		Score		Set 1	Set 2	Set 3	Set 4	Set 5	Total	Report
27 May	18:00	Haiti	3–1	Martinique	22–25	25–21	25–20	25–23		97–89	P2 P3

===== Final =====
Date	Time		Score		Set 1	Set 2	Set 3	Set 4	Set 5	Total	Report
27 May	20:00	U.S. Virgin Islands	3–1	Curaçao	25–23	25–15	19–25	25–17		94–80	P2 P3

==== Final standing ====
Rank	Team
1	U.S. Virgin Islands
2	Curaçao
3	Haiti
4	Martinique

=== Pool D ===
- Venue: Marriott Dome, Basseterre, Saint Kitts and Nevis
- Dates: July 27–28, 2012
- All times are Atlantic Standard Time (UTC−04:00)

==== Preliminary round ====
Pos	Team	Pld	W	L	Pts	SPW	SPL	SPR	SW	SL	SR
1	Saint Kitts and Nevis	3	3	0	15	225	146	1.541	9	0	MAX
2	Anguilla	3	2	1	10	200	182	1.099	6	3	2.000
3	Bermuda	3	1	2	5	182	213	0.854	3	6	0.500
4	Sint Maarten	3	0	3	0	160	226	0.708	0	9	0.000

Date	Time		Score		Set 1	Set 2	Set 3	Set 4	Set 5	Total	Report
27 Jul	09:00	Saint Kitts and Nevis	3–0	Sint Maarten	25–9	25–16	25–19			75–44	P2 P3
27 Jul	11:00	Bermuda	0–3	Anguilla	21–25	15–25	18–25			54–75	P2 P3
27 Jul	18:00	Bermuda	3–0	Sint Maarten	25–22	25–21	25–20			75–63	P2 P3
27 Jul	20:00	Saint Kitts and Nevis	3–0	Anguilla	25–18	25–19	25–12			75–49	P2 P3
28 Jul	09:00	Saint Kitts and Nevis	3–0	Bermuda	25–15	25–17	25–21			75–53	P2 P3
28 Jul	11:00	Anguilla	3–0	Sint Maarten	26–24	25–18	25–11			76–53	P2 P3

==== Final round ====
===== 3rd place =====
Date	Time		Score		Set 1	Set 2	Set 3	Set 4	Set 5	Total	Report
28 Jul	18:00	Bermuda	3–0	Sint Maarten	25–20	25–8	25–20			75–48	P2 P3

===== Final =====
Date	Time		Score		Set 1	Set 2	Set 3	Set 4	Set 5	Total	Report
28 Jul	20:00	Saint Kitts and Nevis	3–0	Anguilla	25–11	25–18	25–12			75–41	P2 P3

==== Final standing ====
Rank	Team
1	Saint Kitts and Nevis
2	Anguilla
3	Bermuda
4	Sint Maarten

=== Pool E ===
- Venue: Alfred Sangster Auditorium, Kingston, Jamaica
- Dates: November 29–30, 2012
- All times are Eastern Standard Time (UTC−05:00)

==== Preliminary round ====
Pos	Team	Pld	W	L	Pts	SPW	SPL	SPR	SW	SL	SR
1	Jamaica	3	3	0	14	243	157	1.548	9	1	9.000
2	Barbados	3	2	1	11	232	150	1.547	7	3	2.333
3	Aruba	3	1	2	5	146	191	0.764	3	6	0.500
4	Cayman Islands	2	0	2	0	102	225	0.453	0	6	0.000

Date	Time		Score		Set 1	Set 2	Set 3	Set 4	Set 5	Total	Report
29 Nov	09:00	Barbados	3–0	Aruba	25–10	25–15	25–7			75–32	P2 P3
29 Nov	11:00	Jamaica	3–0	Cayman Islands	25–7	25–15	25–14			75–36	P2 P3
29 Nov	18:00	Barbados	3–0	Cayman Islands	25–11	25–8	25–6			75–25	P2 P3
29 Nov	20:00	Jamaica	3–0	Aruba	25–12	25–10	25–17			75–39	P2 P3
30 Nov	09:00	Aruba	3–0	Cayman Islands	25–8	25–12	25–21			75–41	P2 P3
30 Nov	11:00	Jamaica	3–1	Barbados	25–21	25–19	18–25	25–17		93–82	P2 P3

==== Final round ====
===== 3rd place =====
Date	Time		Score		Set 1	Set 2	Set 3	Set 4	Set 5	Total	Report
30 Nov	18:00	Aruba	3–0	Cayman Islands	25–18	25–11	25–13			75–42	P2 P3

===== Final =====
Date	Time		Score		Set 1	Set 2	Set 3	Set 4	Set 5	Total	Report
30 Nov	20:00	Jamaica	3–1	Barbados	25–14	26–24	23–25	25–19		99–82	P2 P3

==== Final standing ====
Rank	Team
1	Jamaica
2	Barbados
3	Aruba
4	Cayman Islands

=== Pool F ===
- Venue: Multi-Purpose Sports Complex, Road Town, British Virgin Islands
- Dates: June 9–10, 2012
- All times are Atlantic Standard Time (UTC−04:00)

==== Preliminary round ====
Pos	Team	Pld	W	L	Pts	SPW	SPL	SPR	SW	SL	SR
1	Dominica	3	3	0	12	284	240	1.183	9	3	3.000
2	Antigua and Barbuda	3	1	2	7	251	241	1.041	5	6	0.833
3	Saint Martin	3	1	2	6	230	254	0.906	5	7	0.714
4	British Virgin Islands	3	1	2	5	218	248	0.879	4	7	0.571

Date	Time		Score		Set 1	Set 2	Set 3	Set 4	Set 5	Total	Report
09 Jun	09:00	Dominica	3–1	Antigua and Barbuda	25–22	26–24	26–28	25–22		102–96	P2 P3
09 Jun	11:00	British Virgin Islands	1–3	Saint Martin	15–25	25–18	15–25	17–25		72–93	P2 P3
09 Jun	18:00	Dominica	3–2	Saint Martin	22–25	25–16	20–25	25–16	15–7	107–89	P2 P3
09 Jun	20:00	British Virgin Islands	3–1	Antigua and Barbuda	16–25	25–14	25–19	25–22		91–80	P2 P3
10 Jun	09:00	Antigua and Barbuda	3–0	Saint Martin	25–14	25–14	25–20			75–48	P2 P3
10 Jun	11:00	British Virgin Islands	0–3	Dominica	19–25	20–25	16–25			55–75	P2 P3

==== Final round ====
===== 3rd place =====
Date	Time		Score		Set 1	Set 2	Set 3	Set 4	Set 5	Total	Report
10 Jun	18:00	British Virgin Islands	3–1	Saint Martin	25–20	26–28	25–18	25–10		101–76	P2 P3

===== Final =====
Date	Time		Score		Set 1	Set 2	Set 3	Set 4	Set 5	Total	Report
10 Jun	20:00	Dominica	3–1	Antigua and Barbuda	26–24	25–22	21–25	26–24		98–95	P2 P3

==== Final standing ====
Rank	Team
1	Dominica
2	Antigua and Barbuda
3	British Virgin Islands
4	Saint Martin

=== Pool G ===
- Venue: Gimnasio José Beto Remón, Panama City, Panama
- Dates: August 17–19, 2012
- All times are Eastern Standard Time (UTC−05:00)

Pos	Team	Pld	W	L	Pts	SPW	SPL	SPR	SW	SL	SR
1	Panama	3	3	0	14	251	159	1.579	9	1	9.000
2	El Salvador	3	2	1	9	219	182	1.203	6	4	1.500
3	Belize	3	1	2	6	200	231	0.866	4	6	0.667
4	Bonaire	3	0	3	1	153	251	0.610	1	9	0.111

Date	Time		Score		Set 1	Set 2	Set 3	Set 4	Set 5	Total	Report
17 Aug	18:00	El Salvador	3–0	Belize	25–22	25–13	25–18			75–53	P2 P3
17 Aug	21:00	Panama	3–0	Bonaire	25–14	25–5	26–24			76–43	P2 P3
18 Aug	18:00	El Salvador	3–1	Bonaire	25–5	25–10	25–27	25–12		100–54	P2 P3
18 Aug	20:00	Panama	3–1	Belize	25–27	25–22	25–10	25–13		100–72	P2 P3
19 Aug	15:00	Belize	3–0	Bonaire	25–19	25–19	25–18			75–56	P2 P3
19 Aug	17:00	Panama	3–0	El Salvador	25–18	25–15	25–11			75–44	P2 P3

=== Pool H ===
- Venue: Gimnasio del Polideportivo España, Managua, Nicaragua
- Dates: May 18–20, 2012
- All times are Central Standard Time (UTC−06:00)

Pos	Team	Pld	W	L	Pts	SPW	SPL	SPR	SW	SL	SR
1	Nicaragua	2	2	0	8	185	138	1.341	6	2	3.000
2	Guatemala	2	1	1	6	194	183	1.060	5	4	1.250
3	Honduras	2	0	2	1	118	176	0.670	1	6	0.167

Date	Time		Score		Set 1	Set 2	Set 3	Set 4	Set 5	Total	Report
18 May	19:00	Nicaragua	3–0	Honduras	25–14	25–15	25–16			75–45	P2 P3
19 May	18:00	Guatemala	3–1	Honduras	25–22	26–28	25–13	25–10		101–73	P2 P3
20 May	18:00	Nicaragua	3–2	Guatemala	25–15	22–25	25–17	23–25	15–11	110–93	P2 P3

== Second round ==
=== Pool I ===
- Venue: UWI Sport & Physical Education Centre, Port of Spain, Trinidad and Tobago
- Dates: May 25–26, 2013
- All times are Atlantic Standard Time (UTC−04:00)

==== Preliminary round ====
Pos	Team	Pld	W	L	Pts	SPW	SPL	SPR	SW	SL	SR
1	Trinidad and Tobago	3	3	0	15	226	119	1.899	9	0	MAX
2	Barbados	3	2	1	10	193	171	1.129	6	3	2.000
3	Honduras	3	1	2	5	170	188	0.904	3	6	0.500
4	Anguilla	3	0	3	0	114	225	0.507	0	9	0.000

Date	Time		Score		Set 1	Set 2	Set 3	Set 4	Set 5	Total	Report
25 May	09:00	Trinidad and Tobago	3–0	Barbados	25–13	25–6	26–24			76–43	P2 P3
25 May	11:00	Honduras	3–0	Anguilla	25–15	25–12	25–11			75–38	P2 P3
25 May	18:00	Anguilla	0–3	Barbados	13–25	12–25	15–25			40–75	P2 P3
25 May	20:00	Trinidad and Tobago	3–0	Honduras	25–15	25–11	25–14			75–40	P2 P3
26 May	09:00	Trinidad and Tobago	3–0	Anguilla	25–14	25–14	25–8			75–36	P2 P3
26 May	11:00	Honduras	0–3	Barbados	18–25	20–25	17–25			55–75	P2 P3

==== Final round ====
===== 3rd place =====
Date	Time		Score		Set 1	Set 2	Set 3	Set 4	Set 5	Total	Report
26 May	18:00	Honduras	3–0	Anguilla	25–9	25–18	25–18			75–45	P2 P3

===== Final =====
Date	Time		Score		Set 1	Set 2	Set 3	Set 4	Set 5	Total	Report
26 May	20:00	Trinidad and Tobago	3–1	Barbados	25–18	20–25	25–17	25–20		95–80	P2 P3

==== Final standing ====
Rank	Team
1	Trinidad and Tobago
2	Barbados
3	Honduras
4	Anguilla

=== Pool J ===
- Venue: International School Auditorium, Willemstad, Curaçao
- Dates: May 11–12, 2013
- All times are Atlantic Standard Time (UTC−04:00)

==== Preliminary round ====
Pos	Team	Pld	W	L	Pts	SPW	SPL	SPR	SW	SL	SR
1	Curaçao	3	3	0	15	225	120	1.875	9	0	MAX
2	Saint Lucia	3	2	1	9	228	207	1.101	6	4	1.500
3	Belize	3	1	2	5	219	241	0.909	4	7	0.571
4	Antigua and Barbuda	3	0	3	1	139	243	0.572	1	9	0.111

Date	Time		Score		Set 1	Set 2	Set 3	Set 4	Set 5	Total	Report
11 May	09:00	Antigua and Barbuda	1–3	Belize	11–25	25–18	17–25	13–25		66–93	P2 P3
11 May	11:00	Curaçao	3–0	Saint Lucia	25–12	25–22	25–19			75–53	P2 P3
11 May	18:00	Saint Lucia	3–1	Belize	24–26	25–18	26–24	25–17		100–85	P2 P3
11 May	20:00	Curaçao	3–0	Antigua and Barbuda	25–8	25–9	25–9			75–26	P2 P3
12 May	09:00	Saint Lucia	3–0	Antigua and Barbuda	25–14	25–18	25–15			75–47	P2 P3
12 May	11:00	Curaçao	3–0	Belize	25–11	25–19	25–11			75–41	P2 P3

==== Final round ====
===== 3rd place =====
Date	Time		Score		Set 1	Set 2	Set 3	Set 4	Set 5	Total	Report
12 May	18:00	Belize	3–0	Antigua and Barbuda	25–16	25–20	25–18			75–54	P2 P3

===== Final =====
Date	Time		Score		Set 1	Set 2	Set 3	Set 4	Set 5	Total	Report
12 May	20:00	Curaçao	3–0	Saint Lucia	25–10	25–15	25–11			75–36	P2 P3

==== Final standing ====
Rank	Team
1	Curaçao
2	Saint Lucia
3	Belize
4	Antigua and Barbuda

=== Pool K ===
- Venue: (United States Virgin Islands) Ronald Charles Basketball Arena, Saint Croix, U.S. Virgin Islands
- Dates: May 25–26, 2013
- All times are Atlantic Standard Time (UTC−04:00)

==== Preliminary round ====
Pos	Team	Pld	W	L	Pts	SPW	SPL	SPR	SW	SL	SR
1	El Salvador	3	3	0	14	243	178	1.365	9	1	9.000
2	U.S. Virgin Islands	3	2	1	11	233	165	1.412	7	3	2.333
3	Saint Vincent and the Grenadines	3	1	2	5	172	203	0.847	3	6	0.500
4	British Virgin Islands	3	0	3	0	123	225	0.547	0	9	0.000

Date	Time		Score		Set 1	Set 2	Set 3	Set 4	Set 5	Total	Report
25 May	09:00	El Salvador	3–0	British Virgin Islands	25–12	25–17	25–9			75–38	P2 P3
25 May	11:00	U.S. Virgin Islands	3–0	St. Vincent & the Grenadines	25–6	25–17	25–17			75–40	P2 P3
25 May	18:00	St. Vincent & the Grenadines	3–0	British Virgin Islands	25–19	25–16	25–18			75–53	P2 P3
25 May	20:00	U.S. Virgin Islands	1–3	El Salvador	25–18	18–25	17–25	23–25		83–93	P2 P3
26 May	09:00	St. Vincent & the Grenadines	0–3	El Salvador	18–25	20–25	19–25			57–75	P2 P3
26 May	11:00	U.S. Virgin Islands	3–0	British Virgin Islands	25–13	25–4	25–15			75–32	P2 P3

==== Final round ====
===== 3rd place =====
Date	Time		Score		Set 1	Set 2	Set 3	Set 4	Set 5	Total	Report
26 May	18:00	St. Vincent & the Grenadines	3–0	British Virgin Islands	25–19	25–23	25–17			75–59	P2 P3

===== Final =====
Date	Time		Score		Set 1	Set 2	Set 3	Set 4	Set 5	Total	Report
26 May	20:00	El Salvador	3–2	U.S. Virgin Islands	21–25	25–21	17–25	25–18	15–9	103–98	P2 P3

==== Final standing ====
Rank	Team
1	El Salvador
2	U.S. Virgin Islands
3	St. Vincent & the Grenadines
4	British Virgin Islands

=== Pool L ===
- Venue: Gimnasio Alfonso Gordillo, Guatemala City, Guatemala
- Dates: June 8–9, 2013
- All times are Central Standard Time (UTC−06:00)

==== Preliminary round ====
Pos	Team	Pld	W	L	Pts	SPW	SPL	SPR	SW	SL	SR
1	Guatemala	3	3	0	15	225	123	1.829	9	0	MAX
2	Guadeloupe	3	2	1	10	210	161	1.304	6	3	2.000
3	Saint Kitts and Nevis	3	1	2	5	160	188	0.851	3	6	0.500
4	Aruba	3	0	3	0	102	225	0.453	0	9	0.000

Date	Time		Score		Set 1	Set 2	Set 3	Set 4	Set 5	Total	Report
08 Jun	09:00	Guadeloupe	3–0	Aruba	25–11	25–13	25–14			75–38	P2 P3
08 Jun	11:00	Guatemala	3–0	Saint Kitts and Nevis	25–13	25–14	25–10			75–37	P2 P3
08 Jun	18:00	Saint Kitts and Nevis	3–0	Aruba	25–10	25–15	25–13			75–38	P2 P3
08 Jun	20:00	Guatemala	3–0	Guadeloupe	25–22	25–23	25–15			75–60	P2 P3
09 Jun	09:00	Saint Kitts and Nevis	0–3	Guadeloupe	17–25	16–25	15–25			48–75	P2 P3
09 Jun	11:00	Guatemala	3–0	Aruba	25–4	25–10	25–12			75–26	P2 P3

==== Final round ====
===== 3rd place =====
Date	Time		Score		Set 1	Set 2	Set 3	Set 4	Set 5	Total	Report
09 Jun	18:00	Saint Kitts and Nevis	3–0	Aruba	25–16	25–21	25–19			75–56	P2 P3

===== Final =====
Date	Time		Score		Set 1	Set 2	Set 3	Set 4	Set 5	Total	Report
09 Jun	20:00	Guatemala	3–1	Guadeloupe	25–20	24–26	25–18	25–21		99–85	P2 P3

==== Final standing ====
Rank	Team
1	Guatemala
2	Guadeloupe
3	Saint Kitts and Nevis
4	Aruba

=== Pool M ===
- Venue: Alfred Sangster Auditorium, Kingston, Jamaica
- Dates: June 1–2, 2013
- All times are Eastern Standard Time (UTC−05:00)

==== Preliminary round ====
Pos	Team	Pld	W	L	Pts	SPW	SPL	SPR	SW	SL	SR
1	Nicaragua	3	3	0	13	275	204	1.348	9	2	4.500
2	Jamaica	3	2	1	11	225	200	1.125	7	3	2.333
3	Suriname	3	1	2	6	235	210	1.119	4	6	0.667
4	Bermuda	3	0	3	0	104	225	0.462	0	9	0.000

Date	Time		Score		Set 1	Set 2	Set 3	Set 4	Set 5	Total	Report
01 Jun	09:00	Nicaragua	3–1	Suriname	28–26	21–25	25–22	25–23		99–96	P2 P3
01 Jun	11:00	Jamaica	3–0	Bermuda	25–11	25–16	25–8			75–35	P2 P3
01 Jun	18:00	Nicaragua	3–0	Bermuda	25–16	25–13	25–4			75–33	P2 P3
01 Jun	20:00	Jamaica	3–0	Suriname	25–23	25–20	25–21			75–64	P2 P3
02 Jun	09:00	Suriname	3–0	Bermuda	25–11	25–14	25–11			75–36	P2 P3
02 Jun	11:00	Jamaica	1–3	Nicaragua	15–25	18–25	28–26	14–25		75–101	P2 P3

==== Final round ====
===== 3rd place =====
Date	Time		Score		Set 1	Set 2	Set 3	Set 4	Set 5	Total	Report
02 Jun	18:00	Suriname	3–0	Bermuda	25–15	25–9	25–12			75–36	P2 P3

===== Final =====
Date	Time		Score		Set 1	Set 2	Set 3	Set 4	Set 5	Total	Report
02 Jun	20:00	Nicaragua	3–2	Jamaica	21–25	25–14	22–25	25–17	15–10	108–91	P2 P3

==== Final standing ====
Rank	Team
1	Nicaragua
2	Jamaica
3	Suriname
4	Bermuda

=== Pool N ===
- Venue: La Borie Indoor Stadium, St. George's, Grenada
- Dates: June 22–23, 2013
- All times are Atlantic Standard Time (UTC−04:00)

==== Preliminary round ====
Pos	Team	Pld	W	L	Pts	SPW	SPL	SPR	SW	SL	SR
1	Panama	3	3	0	14	244	175	1.394	9	1	9.000
2	Haiti	3	2	1	11	236	201	1.174	7	3	2.333
3	Dominica	3	1	2	5	183	192	0.953	3	6	0.500
4	Grenada	3	0	3	0	130	225	0.578	0	9	0.000

Date	Time		Score		Set 1	Set 2	Set 3	Set 4	Set 5	Total	Report
22 Jun	09:00	Dominica	0–3	Panama	21–25	10–25	18–25			49–75	P2 P3
22 Jun	11:00	Grenada	0–3	Haiti	13–25	18–25	17–25			48–75	P2 P3
22 Jun	18:00	Panama	3–1	Haiti	19–25	25–23	25–20	25–18		94–86	P2 P3
22 Jun	20:00	Dominica	3–0	Grenada	25–19	25–12	25–11			75–42	P2 P3
23 Jun	09:00	Dominica	0–3	Haiti	18–25	18–25	23–25			59–75	P2 P3
23 Jun	11:00	Panama	3–0	Grenada	25–19	25–10	25–11			75–40	P2 P3

==== Final round ====
===== 3rd place =====
Date	Time		Score		Set 1	Set 2	Set 3	Set 4	Set 5	Total	Report
23 Jun	18:00	Dominica	3–0	Grenada	25–16	25–7	25–19			75–42	P2 P3

===== Final =====
Date	Time		Score		Set 1	Set 2	Set 3	Set 4	Set 5	Total	Report
23 Jun	20:00	Panama	3–0	Haiti	25–18	25–20	25–16			75–54	P2 P3

==== Final standing ====
Rank	Team
1	Panama
2	Haiti
3	Dominica
4	Grenada

=== Third placed teams ===
Pool	Rank	Team
I	18	Honduras
N	20	Dominica
L	21	Saint Kitts and Nevis
K	25	St. Vincent & the Grenadines
J	28	Belize
M	28	Suriname

== Third round ==
=== Pool O ===
- Venue: OTC Sports Center I, Colorado Springs, United States
- Dates: May 15–18, 2014
- All times are Mountain Daylight Time (UTC−06:00)

==== Preliminary round ====
Pos	Team	Pld	W	L	Pts	SPW	SPL	SPR	SW	SL	SR
1	United States	3	3	0	15	225	117	1.923	9	0	MAX
2	Panama	3	2	1	7	231	246	0.939	6	6	1.000
3	Guatemala	3	1	2	6	239	261	0.916	5	7	0.714
4	Honduras	3	0	3	2	199	270	0.737	2	9	0.222

Date	Time		Score		Set 1	Set 2	Set 3	Set 4	Set 5	Total	Report
15 May	13:00	Panama	3–1	Honduras	25–17	20–25	25–13	25–16		95–71	P2 P3
15 May	15:00	United States	3–0	Guatemala	25–10	25–18	25–11			75–39	P2 P3
16 May	13:00	Honduras	1–3	Guatemala	19–25	19–25	27–25	22–25		87–100	P2 P3
16 May	15:00	United States	3–0	Panama	25–16	25–12	25–9			75–37	P2 P3
17 May	13:00	Panama	3–2	Guatemala	16–25	25–16	18–25	25–23	15–11	99–100	P2 P3
17 May	15:00	United States	3–0	Honduras	25–12	25–13	25–16			75–41	P2 P3

==== Final round ====
===== 3rd place =====
Date	Time		Score		Set 1	Set 2	Set 3	Set 4	Set 5	Total	Report
18 May	13:00	Guatemala	3–2	Honduras	25–21	22–25	25–21	23–25	15–13	110–105	P2 P3

===== Final =====
Date	Time		Score		Set 1	Set 2	Set 3	Set 4	Set 5	Total	Report
18 May	15:00	United States	3–0	Panama	25–18	25–5	25–5			75–28	P2 P3

==== Final standing ====
Rank	Team
1	United States
2	Panama
3	Guatemala
4	Honduras

=== Pool P ===
- Venue: Polideportivo Eleoncio Mercedes, La Romana, Dominican Republic
- Dates: May 15–18, 2014
- All times are Atlantic Standard Time (UTC−04:00)

==== Preliminary round ====
Pos	Team	Pld	W	L	Pts	SPW	SPL	SPR	SW	SL	SR
1	Dominican Republic	3	3	0	15	225	112	2.009	9	0	MAX
2	Nicaragua	3	2	1	9	212	206	1.029	6	4	1.500
3	Guadeloupe	3	1	2	4	231	270	0.856	4	8	0.500
4	El Salvador	3	0	3	2	180	260	0.692	2	9	0.222

Date	Time		Score		Set 1	Set 2	Set 3	Set 4	Set 5	Total	Report
15 May	17:00	El Salvador	0–3	Nicaragua	16–25	17–25	13–25			46–75	P2 P3
15 May	19:00	Dominican Republic	3–0	Guadeloupe	25–13	25–7	25–16			75–36	P2 P3
16 May	17:00	Nicaragua	3–1	Guadeloupe	25–22	19–25	25–23	25–15		94–85	P2 P3
16 May	19:00	Dominican Republic	3–0	El Salvador	25–11	25–10	25–12			75–33	P2 P3
17 May	17:00	Guadeloupe	3–2	El Salvador	21–25	25–21	26–24	23–25	15–6	110–101	P2 P3
17 May	19:00	Dominican Republic	3–0	Nicaragua	25–7	25–14	25–22			75–43	P2 P3

==== Final round ====
===== 3rd place =====
Date	Time		Score		Set 1	Set 2	Set 3	Set 4	Set 5	Total	Report
18 May	16:00	Guadeloupe	1–3	El Salvador	23–25	25–17	15–25	23–25		86–92	P2 P3

===== Final =====
Date	Time		Score		Set 1	Set 2	Set 3	Set 4	Set 5	Total	Report
18 May	18:00	Dominican Republic	3–0	Nicaragua	25–10	25–8	25–11			75–29	P2 P3

==== Final standing ====
Rank	Team
1	Dominican Republic
2	Nicaragua
3	El Salvador
4	Guadeloupe

=== Pool Q ===
- Venue: Coliseo de la Ciudad Deportiva, Havana, Cuba
- Dates: May 14–17, 2014
- All times are Cuba Daylight Time (UTC−04:00)

==== Preliminary round ====
Pos	Team	Pld	W	L	Pts	SPW	SPL	SPR	SW	SL	SR
1	Cuba	3	3	0	15	226	134	1.687	9	0	MAX
2	Trinidad and Tobago	3	2	1	8	244	192	1.271	6	5	1.200
3	Curaçao	3	1	2	6	182	223	0.816	4	6	0.667
4	Haiti	3	0	3	1	139	242	0.574	1	9	0.111

Date	Time		Score		Set 1	Set 2	Set 3	Set 4	Set 5	Total	Report
14 May	15:00	Haiti	1–3	Trinidad and Tobago	25–17	3–25	9–25	12–25		49–92	P2 P3
14 May	17:00	Cuba	3–0	Curaçao	25–5	25–17	25–18			75–40	P2 P3
15 May	15:00	Trinidad and Tobago	3–1	Curaçao	25–15	22–25	25–9	25–18		97–67	P2 P3
15 May	17:00	Cuba	3–0	Haiti	25–13	25–12	25–14			75–39	P2 P3
16 May	15:00	Curaçao	3–0	Haiti	25–16	25–20	25–15			75–51	P2 P3
16 May	17:00	Cuba	3–0	Trinidad and Tobago	25–15	25–16	26–24			76–55	P2 P3

==== Final round ====
===== 3rd place =====
Date	Time		Score		Set 1	Set 2	Set 3	Set 4	Set 5	Total	Report
17 May	15:00	Curaçao	2–3	Haiti	22–25	22–25	25–19	25–18	11–15	105–102	P2 P3

===== Final =====
Date	Time		Score		Set 1	Set 2	Set 3	Set 4	Set 5	Total	Report
17 May	17:00	Cuba	3–0	Trinidad and Tobago	25–18	25–20	25–13			75–51	P2 P3

==== Final standing ====
Rank	Team
1	Cuba
2	Trinidad and Tobago
3	Haiti
4	Curaçao

=== Pool R ===
- Venue: Auditorio Juan Pachín Vicéns, Ponce, Puerto Rico
- Dates: May 22–25, 2014
- All times are Atlantic Standard Time (UTC−04:00)

==== Preliminary round ====
Pos	Team	Pld	W	L	Pts	SPW	SPL	SPR	SW	SL	SR
1	Puerto Rico	3	3	0	15	225	96	2.344	9	0	MAX
2	Costa Rica	3	2	1	10	203	157	1.293	6	3	2.000
3	Barbados	3	1	2	4	155	230	0.674	3	7	0.429
4	Saint Lucia	3	0	3	1	147	247	0.595	1	9	0.111

Date	Time		Score		Set 1	Set 2	Set 3	Set 4	Set 5	Total	Report
22 May	14:00	Barbados	3–1	Saint Lucia	25–23	22–25	25–14	25–18		97–80	P2 P3
22 May	20:00	Puerto Rico	3–0	Costa Rica	25–20	25–14	25–19			75–53	P2 P3
23 May	16:00	Costa Rica	3–0	Barbados	25–11	25–9	25–18			75–38	P2 P3
23 May	18:00	Puerto Rico	3–0	Saint Lucia	25–4	25–9	25–10			75–23	P2 P3
24 May	14:00	Saint Lucia	0–3	Costa Rica	18–25	12–25	14–25			44–75	P2 P3
24 May	18:00	Puerto Rico	3–0	Barbados	25–4	25–8	25–8			75–20	P2 P3

==== Final round ====
===== 3rd place =====
Date	Time		Score		Set 1	Set 2	Set 3	Set 4	Set 5	Total	Report
25 May	16:00	Barbados	3–1	Saint Lucia	25–21	25–23	25–27	25–17		100–88	P2 P3

===== Final =====
Date	Time		Score		Set 1	Set 2	Set 3	Set 4	Set 5	Total	Report
25 May	18:00	Puerto Rico	3–0	Costa Rica	25–14	25–16	25–11			75–41	P2 P3

==== Final standing ====
Rank	Team
1	Puerto Rico
2	Costa Rica
3	Barbados
4	Saint Lucia

=== Pool S ===
- Venue: Hershey Centre, Mississauga, Canada
- Dates: May 16–19, 2014
- All times are Eastern Daylight Time (UTC−04:00)

==== Preliminary round ====
Pos	Team	Pld	W	L	Pts	SPW	SPL	SPR	SW	SL	SR
1	Canada	3	3	0	14	247	137	1.803	9	1	9.000
2	Mexico	3	2	1	11	227	190	1.195	7	3	2.333
3	Jamaica	3	1	2	5	151	205	0.737	3	6	0.500
4	U.S. Virgin Islands	3	0	3	0	132	225	0.587	0	9	0.000

Date	Time		Score		Set 1	Set 2	Set 3	Set 4	Set 5	Total	Report
16 May	14:00	Mexico	3–0	U.S. Virgin Islands	25–12	25–14	25–19			75–45	P2 P3
16 May	18:00	Canada	3–0	Jamaica	25–9	25–10	25–9			75–28	P2 P3
17 May	14:00	Jamaica	3–0	U.S. Virgin Islands	25–22	25–14	25–19			75–55	P2 P3
17 May	20:00	Canada	3–1	Mexico	25–16	25–20	22–25	25–16		97–77	P2 P3
18 May	16:00	Mexico	3–0	Jamaica	25–11	25–16	25–21			75–48	P2 P3
18 May	18:00	Canada	3–0	U.S. Virgin Islands	25–12	25–9	25–11			75–32	P2 P3

==== Final round ====
===== 3rd place =====
Date	Time		Score		Set 1	Set 2	Set 3	Set 4	Set 5	Total	Report
19 May	16:00	Jamaica	3–0	U.S. Virgin Islands	25–13	25–10	25–11			75–34	P2 P3

===== Final =====
Date	Time		Score		Set 1	Set 2	Set 3	Set 4	Set 5	Total	Report
19 May	20:00	Canada	3–0	Mexico	25–16	25–19	25–17			75–52	P2 P3

==== Final standing ====
Rank	Team
1	Canada
2	Mexico
3	Jamaica
4	U.S. Virgin Islands

== Final round ==
=== Playoff ===
- Venue: UWI Sport & Physical Education Centre, Port of Spain, Trinidad and Tobago
- Dates: July 16–20, 2014
- All times are Atlantic Standard Time (UTC−04:00)

Pos	Team	Pld	W	L	Pts	SPW	SPL	SPR	SW	SL	SR
1	Mexico	4	4	0	20	306	195	1.569	12	0	MAX
2	Trinidad and Tobago	4	3	1	15	286	243	1.177	9	3	3.000
3	Costa Rica	4	2	2	8	300	323	0.929	6	8	0.750
4	Nicaragua	4	1	3	5	292	324	0.901	4	10	0.400
5	Panama	4	0	4	2	248	347	0.715	2	12	0.167

Date	Time		Score		Set 1	Set 2	Set 3	Set 4	Set 5	Total	Report
16 July	18:00	Mexico	3–0	Costa Rica	25–14	25–17	25–11			75–42	P2 P3
16 July	20:00	Trinidad and Tobago	3–0	Panama	25–17	25–16	25–15			75–48	P2 P3
17 July	18:00	Panama	0–3	Mexico	13–25	15–25	20–25			48–75	P2 P3
17 July	20:00	Trinidad and Tobago	3–0	Nicaragua	26–24	25–19	25–13			76–56	P2 P3
18 July	18:00	Nicaragua	3–1	Panama	25–16	24–26	25–10	25–19		99–71	P2 P3
18 July	20:00	Trinidad and Tobago	3–0	Costa Rica	25–22	25–15	25–21			75–58	P2 P3
19 July	18:00	Costa Rica	3–1	Panama	25–19	25–19	23–25	25–18		98–81	P2 P3
19 July	20:00	Nicaragua	0–3	Mexico	12–25	14–25	19–25			45–75	P2 P3
20 July	18:00	Nicaragua	1–3	Costa Rica	26–24	22–25	26–28	18–25		92–102	P2 P3
20 July	20:00	Trinidad and Tobago	0–3	Mexico	14–25	29–31	17–25			60–81	P2 P3
