= Women's Central American Volleyball Championship =

Biannual sporting competition

- Sport: Volleyball
- Founded: 1974
- No. of teams: 5–7 (Tournament Rank)
- Continent: Central America and the Caribbean (AFECAVOL)
- Most recent champion: Costa Rica (19th title)
- Most titles: Costa Rica (19 titles)

The Women's Central American Volleyball Championship is the official competition for senior women's national volleyball teams of Central America and the Caribbean, organized by the Central American Volleyball Confederation (AFECAVOL). Since its introduction in 1974 the tournaments have been awarded every two years. The competition has been dominated entirely by Costa Rica with 19 titles, followed by Panama with two titles, followed by Honduras and Nicaragua with one title each.

== History ==
| Year | Host | Final | | | 3rd place match | | | Teams |
| Year | Host | Champions | Score | Runners-up | 3rd place | Score | 4th place | Teams |
|---|---|---|---|---|---|---|---|---|
| 1974; Details | El Salvador | Panama | | Guatemala | El Salvador | | Costa Rica | 5 |
| 1976; Details | Costa Rica | Panama | | Costa Rica | Guatemala | | Nicaragua | 5 |
| 1977; Details | Guatemala | Costa Rica | | Guatemala | El Salvador | | Nicaragua | 4 |
| 1987; Details | Nicaragua | Costa Rica | | Guatemala | Nicaragua | | El Salvador | 5 |
| 1989; Details | Costa Rica | Costa Rica | | Guatemala | Honduras | | Nicaragua | 6 |
| 1991; Details | Honduras | Honduras | | Panama | Nicaragua | | Guatemala | 5 |
| 1993; Details | El Salvador | Costa Rica | | Nicaragua | Honduras | | El Salvador | 5 |
| 1995; Details | Guatemala | Costa Rica | | Guatemala | Honduras | | Panama | 7 |
| 1997; Details | Honduras | Costa Rica | | Honduras | Nicaragua | | Guatemala | 7 |
| 1999; Details | Guatemala | Costa Rica | | Guatemala | Nicaragua | | El Salvador | 6 |
| 2000; Details | El Salvador | Costa Rica | | Nicaragua | El Salvador | | Panama | 7 |
| 2002; Details | (Nicaragua); Mangua | Costa Rica | | Nicaragua | El Salvador | | Honduras | 5 |
| 2004; Details | Nicaragua | Costa Rica | | Guatemala | Nicaragua | | Honduras | 5 |
| 2006; Details | Costa Rica | Costa Rica | | Guatemala | Nicaragua | | Panama | 6 |
| 2008; Details | (Nicaragua); Managua | Costa Rica | | Guatemala | Nicaragua | | Panama | 7 |
| 2010; Details | Panama City | Costa Rica | | Panama | Nicaragua | | Guatemala | 7 |
| 2012; Details | (El Salvador); San Salvador | Costa Rica | | Nicaragua | Guatemala | | El Salvador | 6 |
| 2014; Details | Guatemala City | Costa Rica | | Nicaragua | Guatemala | | Panama | 7 |
| 2017; Details | (Nicaragua); Managua | Costa Rica | | Nicaragua | Guatemala | | Honduras | 7 |
| 2018; Details | Belize City | Costa Rica | | Belize | El Salvador | | Guatemala | 6 |
| 2021; Details | Nicaragua | Costa Rica | | Nicaragua | El Salvador | | Guatemala | 7 |
| 2023; Details | Nicaragua | Costa Rica | | Honduras | Nicaragua | | El Salvador | 7 |

== Medals ==
| Rank | Nation | Gold | Silver | Bronze | Total |
|---|---|---|---|---|---|
| 1 | Costa Rica | 19 | 1 | 0 | 20 |
| 2 | Panama | 2 | 2 | 0 | 4 |
| 3 | Honduras | 1 | 2 | 3 | 6 |
| 4 | Guatemala | 0 | 9 | 4 | 13 |
| 5 | Nicaragua | 0 | 7 | 9 | 16 |
| 6 | Belize | 0 | 1 | 0 | 1 |
| 7 | El Salvador | 0 | 0 | 6 | 6 |
| Totals (7 entries) | | 22 | 22 | 22 | 66 |

== See also ==
- NORCECA Men's Volleyball Championship
- Women's Junior NORCECA Volleyball Championship
- Girls' Youth NORCECA Volleyball Championship
- Volleyball at the Pan American Games
- Women's Pan-American Volleyball Cup
- Volleyball at the Central American and Caribbean Games
