= Volleyball at the 2010 Central American and Caribbean Games =

2010 Central American and Caribbean Games

Tournament details
- Host country: Puerto Rico
- Dates: July 18–29, 2010
- Teams: 15
- Venue: Palacio de Recreación y Deportes (in Mayagüez host cities)

This page presents the results of the Men's and Women's Volleyball Tournament during the 2010 Central American and Caribbean Games, which was held from July 18–29, 2010 at Palacio de Recreación y Deportes, Mayagüez, Puerto Rico.

== Men's tournament ==
=== Participating teams ===
Group A	Group B
Dominican Republic; Panama; Venezuela	Barbados; Mexico; Puerto Rico; Trinidad and Tobago

=== Preliminary round ===
==== Group A ====
Pos	Team	Pld	W	L	Pts	SW	SL	SR	SPW	SPL	SPR
1	Venezuela	2	2	0	4	6	0	MAX	150	103	1.456
2	Dominican Republic	2	1	1	3	3	4	0.750	156	162	0.963
3	Panama	2	0	2	2	1	6	0.167	136	177	0.768

Date		Score		Set 1	Set 2	Set 3	Set 4	Set 5	Total
24 Jul	Venezuela	3–0	Panama	25–17	25–16	25–16			75–49
25 Jul	Panama	1–3	Dominican Republic	20–25	18–25	29–27	20–25		87–102
26 Jul	Dominican Republic	0–3	Venezuela	22–25	15–25	17–25			54–75

==== Group B ====
Pos	Team	Pld	W	L	Pts	SW	SL	SR	SPW	SPL	SPR
1	Puerto Rico	3	3	0	6	9	2	4.500	269	208	1.293
2	Mexico	3	2	1	5	7	3	2.333	241	217	1.111
3	Trinidad and Tobago	3	1	2	4	3	6	0.500	186	221	0.842
4	Barbados	3	0	3	3	1	9	0.111	202	252	0.802

Date		Score		Set 1	Set 2	Set 3	Set 4	Set 5	Total
24 Jul	Mexico	3–0	Trinidad and Tobago	25–21	25–18	25–16			75–55
24 Jul	Puerto Rico	3–1	Barbados	20–25	25–23	25–8	25–12		95–68
25 Jul	Barbados	0–3	Mexico	16–25	19–25	28–30			63–80
25 Jul	Trinidad and Tobago	0–3	Puerto Rico	11–25	22–25	21–25			54–75
26 Jul	Barbados	0–3	Trinidad and Tobago	23–25	23–25	25–27			71–77
26 Jul	Puerto Rico	3–1	Mexico	25–21	24–26	25–20	25–19		99–86

=== Quarterfinals ===
Date		Score		Set 1	Set 2	Set 3	Set 4	Set 5	Total
27 Jul	Dominican Republic	3–1	Trinidad and Tobago	22–25	25–20	25–20	25–21		97–86
27 Jul	Mexico	3–0	Panama	25–19	25–21	25–14			75–54

=== Medal round ===
Semi-finals
July 28 – Palacio de Recreación y Deportes
Venezuela	3
Mexico	0
July 28 – Palacio de Recreación y Deportes
Puerto Rico	3
Dominican Republic	1

Final
July 29 – Palacio de Recreación y Deportes
Venezuela	2
Puerto Rico	3
Bronze-final
July 29 – Palacio de Recreación y Deportes
Mexico	3
Dominican Republic	2

==== Semifinals ====
Date		Score		Set 1	Set 2	Set 3	Set 4	Set 5	Total
28 Jul	Venezuela	3–0	Mexico	25–21	25–21	25–16			75–58
28 Jul	Puerto Rico	3–1	Dominican Republic	25–21	25–27	25–23	25–22		100–93

==== Classification 5/6 ====
Date		Score		Set 1	Set 2	Set 3	Set 4	Set 5	Total
28 Jul	Trinidad and Tobago	2–3	Panama	25–19	21–25	18–25	25–22	12–15	101–106

==== Bronze-medal match ====
Date		Score		Set 1	Set 2	Set 3	Set 4	Set 5	Total
29 Jul	Mexico	3–2	Dominican Republic	21–25	23–25	25–15	25–16	15–7	109–88

==== Final ====
Date		Score		Set 1	Set 2	Set 3	Set 4	Set 5	Total
29 Jul	Venezuela	2–3	Puerto Rico	25–18	22–25	19–25	25–20	18–20	109–108

=== Final standings ===
1. Puerto Rico
2. Venezuela
3. Mexico
4. Dominican Republic
5. Panama
6. Trinidad and Tobago
7. Barbados

2010 Central American and Caribbean Games winners

Puerto Rico
Fourth title

=== Individual awards ===
- Most valuable player:
  - Héctor Soto (PUR)
- Best spiker:
  - Víctor Rivera (PUR)
- Best blocker:
  - Tomás Aguilera (MEX)
- Best digger:
  - Luis de la Cruz (DOM)
- Best libero:
  - Ryan Mahadeo (TRI)
- Best receiver:
  - Joel Silva (VEN)
- Best server:
  - Iván Márquez (VEN)
- Best setter:
  - Pedro Rangel (MEX)
- Best scorer:
  - Nolan Tash (TRI)

== Women's tournament ==
=== Participating teams ===
Group A	Group B
Barbados; Costa Rica; Dominican Republic; Trinidad and Tobago	Guatemala; Mexico; Nicaragua; Puerto Rico

=== Preliminary round ===
==== Group A ====
Pos	Team	Pld	W	L	Pts	SW	SL	SR	SPW	SPL	SPR
1	Dominican Republic	3	3	0	6	9	0	MAX	225	126	1.786
2	Costa Rica	3	2	1	5	6	5	1.200	243	223	1.090
3	Trinidad and Tobago	3	1	2	4	5	6	0.833	224	246	0.911
4	Barbados	3	0	3	3	0	9	0.000	128	225	0.569

Date		Score		Set 1	Set 2	Set 3	Set 4	Set 5	Total
18 Jul	Trinidad and Tobago	3–0	Barbados	25–16	25–23	25–20			75–69
18 Jul	Dominican Republic	3–0	Costa Rica	25–14	25–22	25–20			75–56
19 Jul	Barbados	0–3	Dominican Republic	6–25	9–25	6–25			21–75
19 Jul	Costa Rica	3–2	Trinidad and Tobago	25–18	25–27	22–25	25–19	15–11	112–100
20 Jul	Barbados	0–3	Costa Rica	19–25	18–25	11–25			48–75
20 Jul	Dominican Republic	3–0	Trinidad and Tobago	25–14	25–14	25–21			75–49

==== Group B ====
Pos	Team	Pld	W	L	Pts	SW	SL	SR	SPW	SPL	SPR
1	Puerto Rico	3	3	0	6	9	0	MAX	225	140	1.607
2	Mexico	3	2	1	5	6	3	2.000	215	174	1.236
3	Guatemala	3	1	2	4	3	8	0.375	183	251	0.729
4	Nicaragua	3	0	3	3	2	9	0.222	193	251	0.769

Date		Score		Set 1	Set 2	Set 3	Set 4	Set 5	Total
18 Jul	Mexico	3–0	Guatemala	25–16	25–14	25–18			75–48
18 Jul	Puerto Rico	3–0	Nicaragua	25–14	25–16	25–11			75–41
19 Jul	Nicaragua	0–3	Mexico	14–25	19–25	18–25			51–75
19 Jul	Guatemala	0–3	Puerto Rico	8–25	14–25	12–25			34–75
20 Jul	Nicaragua	2–3	Guatemala	25–14	19–25	25–22	22–25	10–15	101–101
20 Jul	Puerto Rico	3–0	Mexico	25–22	25–21	25–22			75–65

=== Quarterfinals ===
Date		Score		Set 1	Set 2	Set 3	Set 4	Set 5	Total
21 Jul	Costa Rica	3–0	Guatemala	25–20	25–9	25–17			75–46
21 Jul	Mexico	1–3	Trinidad and Tobago	25–20	21–25	22–25	20–25		88–95

=== 5th–8th places ===
5th–8th places
July 22 – Palacio de Recreación y Deportes
Barbados	2
Guatemala	3
July 22 – Palacio de Recreación y Deportes
Nicaragua	0
Mexico	3

5th place
July 23 – Palacio de Recreación y Deportes
Guatemala	0
Mexico	3
7th place
July 23– Palacio de Recreación y Deportes
Barbados	0
Nicaragua	3

==== Classification 5/8 ====
Date		Score		Set 1	Set 2	Set 3	Set 4	Set 5	Total
22 Jul	Barbados	2–3	Guatemala	24–26	25–21	25–20	17–25	10–15	101–107
22 Jul	Nicaragua	0–3	Mexico	12–25	3–25	14–25			29–75

==== Classification 7/8 ====
Date		Score		Set 1	Set 2	Set 3	Set 4	Set 5	Total
23 Jul	Barbados	0–3	Nicaragua	19–25	21–25	20–25			60–75

==== Classification 5/6 ====
Date		Score		Set 1	Set 2	Set 3	Set 4	Set 5	Total
23 Jul	Guatemala	0–3	Mexico	13–25	23–25	11–25			47–75

=== Medal round ===
Semi-finals
July 22 – Palacio de Recreación y Deportes
Dominican Republic	3
Trinidad and Tobago	0
July 22 – Palacio de Recreación y Deportes
Puerto Rico	3
Costa Rica	0

Final
July 23 – Palacio de Recreación y Deportes
Dominican Republic	3
Puerto Rico	2
Bronze-final
July 23 – Palacio de Recreación y Deportes
Trinidad and Tobago	1
Costa Rica	3

==== Semifinals ====
Date		Score		Set 1	Set 2	Set 3	Set 4	Set 5	Total
22 Jul	Dominican Republic	3–0	Trinidad and Tobago	25–23	25–12	25–22			75–57
22 Jul	Puerto Rico	3–0	Costa Rica	25–21	25–21	25–16			75–58

==== Bronze Medal ====
Date		Score		Set 1	Set 2	Set 3	Set 4	Set 5	Total
23 Jul	Trinidad and Tobago	1–3	Costa Rica	17–25	25–20	16–25	21–25		79–95

==== Gold Medal ====
Date		Score		Set 1	Set 2	Set 3	Set 4	Set 5	Total
23 Jul	Dominican Republic	3–2	Puerto Rico	25–19	19–25	25–19	24–26	15–4	108–93

=== Final standings ===
1. Dominican Republic
2. Puerto Rico
3. Costa Rica
4. Trinidad and Tobago
5. Mexico
6. Guatemala
7. Nicaragua
8. Barbados

2010 Central American and Caribbean Games winners

Dominican Republic
Fifth title

=== Awards ===
- Most valuable player:
  - Deborah Seilhamer (PUR)
- Best spiker:
  - Áurea Cruz (PUR)
- Best blocker:
  - Annerys Vargas (DOM)
- Best digger:
  - Deborah Seilhamer (PUR)
- Best libero:
  - Deborah Seilhamer (PUR)
- Best receiver:
  - Deborah Seilhamer (PUR)
- Best server:
  - Samantha Bricio (MEX)
- Best setter:
  - Vilmarie Mojica (PUR)
- Best scorer:
  - Samantha Bricio (MEX)
- Best scorer:
  - Aury Cruz (PUR)
