= 2019 Women's Junior Pan-American Volleyball Cup =

Tournament details
- Host country: Peru
- Dates: 11 – 19 May 2019
- Teams: 7
- Venue: 1 (in Lima host cities)

Final positions
- Champions: Cuba (1st title)

Tournament awards
- MVP: Ailama Cese (CUB)

The 2019 Women's Junior Pan-American Volleyball Cup was the fifth edition of the bi-annual women's volleyball tournament. Seven teams participated in this edition held in Lima. Cuba won the tournament defeating the Dominican Republic and qualified for the Women's U20 World Championship. Cuba's Ailama Cese won the MVP award.

== Competing nations ==
Group A	Group B
Dominican Republic; Puerto Rico; Chile	Cuba; Peru; Honduras; Guatemala

== Competition format ==
- Seven teams will be divided into two pools. In the group stage each pool will play round robin.
- The two best teams from the first rank team of each pool after group stage will receive byes into the semifinals.
- The remaining first-rank team will play in the quarterfinals along with the second-rank teams.

== Preliminary round ==
- All times are in Peru Standard Time (UTC−05:00)

=== Group A ===
Pos	Team	Pld	W	L	Pts	SPW	SPL	SPR	SW	SL	SR	Qualification
1	Dominican Republic	2	2	0	10	150	95	1.579	6	0	MAX	Semifinals
2	Puerto Rico	2	1	1	3	152	187	0.813	3	5	0.600	Quarterfinals
3	Chile	2	0	2	2	159	179	0.888	2	6	0.333	Quarterfinals

Date	Time		Score		Set 1	Set 2	Set 3	Set 4	Set 5	Total	Report
13 May	17:30	Chile	3–0	Dominican Republic	14–25	16–25	17–25			47–75	P2 P3
14 May	15:00	Puerto Rico	3–2	Chile	26–24	19–25	27–25	17–25	15–13	104–112	P2 P3
15 May	17:00	Dominican Republic	3–0	Puerto Rico	25–15	25–11	25–22			75–48	P2 P3

=== Group B ===
Pos	Team	Pld	W	L	Pts	SPW	SPL	SPR	SW	SL	SR	Qualification
1	Cuba	3	3	0	15	228	127	1.795	9	0	MAX	Semifinals
2	Peru	3	2	1	10	215	138	1.558	6	3	2.000	Quarterfinals
3	Honduras	3	1	2	5	145	201	0.721	3	6	0.500	Quarterfinals
4	Guatemala	3	0	3	0	103	225	0.458	0	9	0.000	

Date	Time		Score		Set 1	Set 2	Set 3	Set 4	Set 5	Total	Report
13 May	15:00	Guatemala	0–3	Cuba	4–25	11–25	10–25			25–75	P2 P3
13 May	19:00	Peru	3–0	Honduras	25–7	25–11	25–15			75–33	P2 P3
14 May	17:00	Honduras	0–3	Cuba	4–25	14–25	19–25			37–75	P2 P3
14 May	19:00	Peru	3–0	Guatemala	25–13	25–5	25–9			75–27	P2 P3
15 May	15:00	Guatemala	0–3	Honduras	25–13	25–5	25–9			75–27	P2 P3
15 May	19:00	Peru	0–3	Cuba	26–28	20–25	19–25			65–78	P2 P3

== Final round ==
=== Championship bracket ===
Quarterfinals
A2	Puerto Rico	3
B3	Honduras	0
B2	Peru	3
A3	Chile	2

Semifinals
A2	Puerto Rico	0
B1	Cuba	3
A1	Dominican Republic	3
B2	Peru	0

Finals
B1	Cuba	3
A1	Dominican Republic	2
Third place
A2	Puerto Rico	0
B2	Peru	3

=== Quarterfinals ===
Date	Time		Score		Set 1	Set 2	Set 3	Set 4	Set 5	Total	Report
16 May	17:00	Puerto Rico	3–0	Honduras	25–16	25–19	25–17			75–52	P2 P3
16 May	19:00	Peru	3–2	Chile	17–25	22–25	29–27	25–18	15–11	108–106	P2 P3

=== 7th place match ===
Date	Time		Score		Set 1	Set 2	Set 3	Set 4	Set 5	Total	Report
18 May	12:00	Guatemala	0–3	Honduras	9–25	11–25	9–25			29–75	P2 P3

=== Semifinals ===
Date	Time		Score		Set 1	Set 2	Set 3	Set 4	Set 5	Total	Report
17 May	17:00	Cuba	3–0	Puerto Rico	25–16	25–19	25–13			75–48	P2 P3
12 May	19:30	Dominican Republic	3–0	Peru	25–19	25–21	25–16			75–56	P2 P3

=== 5th place match ===
Date	Time		Score		Set 1	Set 2	Set 3	Set 4	Set 5	Total	Report
17 May	15:00	Honduras	1–3	Chile	11–25	13–25	25–22	12–25		61–97	P2 P3

=== 3rd place match ===
Date	Time		Score		Set 1	Set 2	Set 3	Set 4	Set 5	Total	Report
18 May	14:00	Peru	3–0	Puerto Rico	25–16	25–23	25–17			75–56	P2 P3

=== Final ===
Date	Time		Score		Set 1	Set 2	Set 3	Set 4	Set 5	Total	Report
18 May	16:00	Dominican Republic	2–3	Cuba	21–25	23–25	25–14	25–15	10–15	104–94	P2 P3

== Final standing ==
Rank	Team
1st place, gold medalist(s)	Cuba
2nd place, silver medalist(s)	Dominican Republic
3rd place, bronze medalist(s)	Peru
4	Puerto Rico
5	Chile
6	Honduras
7	Guatemala

Qualified for FIVB U20 World Championship

2019 Women's Junior Pan-American Cup champions

Cuba
1st title

== Individual awards ==
- Most valuable player
  - Ailama Cesé (CUB)
- Best scorer
  - Ailama Cesé (CUB)
- Best setter
  - Mariana Trujillo (PUR)
- Best Opposite
  - Camila Pérez (PER)
- Best outside hitters
  - Ailama Cesé (CUB)
  - Madeline Guillén (DOM)
- Best middle blockers
  - Geraldine González (DOM)
  - Mariela Jiménez (DOM)
- Best libero
  - Kiaralyz Pérez (PUR)
- Best server
  - Ivy Vila (CUB)
- Best receiver
  - Ivy Vila (CUB)
- Best digger
  - Kiaralyz Pérez (PUR)
