= Samantha Bricio =

Mexican volleyball player (born 1994)

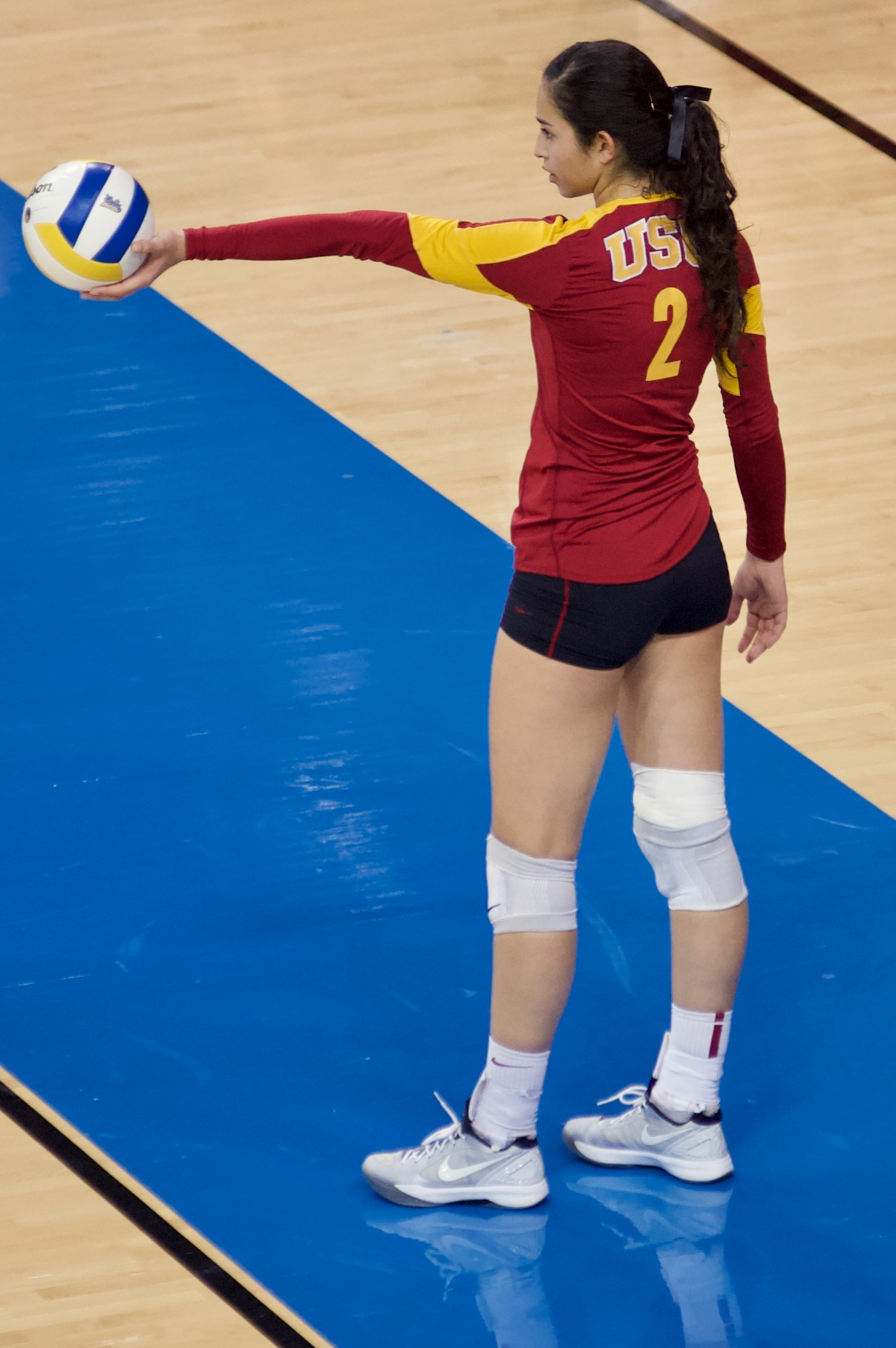
- Bricio at USC

Personal information
- Full name: Samantha Estephania Guadalupe Bricio Ramos
- Nickname: Samy
- Born: 22 November 1994 (age 31) Guadalajara, Jalisco, Mexico
- Home town: Jalisco, Mexico
- Education: University of Southern California
- Height: 1.88 m (6 ft 2 in)
- Weight: 58 kg (128 lb)
- Spike: 302 cm (119 in)
- Block: 283 cm (111 in)

Volleyball information
- Position: Outside hitter
- Number: 12

National team
- Years: Team
- 2010–present: Mexico
- Updated on April 2017

Samantha Bricio born 22 November 1994, is a Mexican volleyball professional player, the youngest player to play for the Mexico national team in its history. Bricio played in the 2009 FIVB Girls Youth World Championship (finishing ninth) and again in 2011, finishing twelfth. She received the 2010 Central American and Caribbean Games Best Scorer and Best Server awards and the Best Scorer award in the 2011 Youth Pan-American Cup, 2011 Junior Pan-American Cup and the 2013 Pan-American Cup.

== Personal life ==
Bricio, 188 cm (6 ft 2 in) tall and weighing 58 kilograms (128 lb), was born on 22 November 1994 in Guadalajara, Jalisco and attended Preparatoria de Universidad del Valle de Atemajac de Guadalajara High School in Guadalajara. Bricio's brother, Irving Alberto José, was a member of the Mexico senior national team who won the 2007 Pan-American Cup and winner of the top Mexican sports award (the Luchador Olmeca). Bricio received bachelor's degree in psychology in 2016 from University of Southern California.

== Career ==
=== 2008 ===
After winning the gold medal in the Mexican National Games (Olimpiada Nacional) in the 13–14-year-old category, Brico won the silver in the NORCECA U-18 Championship and qualified for the 2009 U-18 World Championships. She placed sixth with her national junior team in the 2008 NORCECA U-20 Championship, winning the Rising Star award for her performance at such a young age.

=== 2009 ===
Bricio played in the 2009 FIVB Girls Youth World Championship at Nakhon Ratchasima, Thailand as the team's youngest competitor, age 14. Her team made the second round for the first time, finishing ninth. Bricio's performance attracted the interest of the Mexican Volleyball Federation for the 2011 Pan American Games and the 2012 Olympics. At the end of the year, Bricio and her brother Irving received an award from the Guadalajara city council.

=== 2010 ===
She played in the Guadalajara Volleyball Festival as a junior before the National Games. Bricio then played for Mexico's youth volleyball team, winning a silver medal as Most Valuable Player in the NORCECA Youth Championship and qualifying for the 2011 Girls Youth World Championship. During her first international games with the senior team at the 2010 Central American and Caribbean Games, she won the Best Scorer and Best Server awards as Mexico finished fifth. At age 15, Bricio was the youngest player ever on the Mexico national team. She later won the Private High Schools National Championship with Preparatoria de Universidad del Valle de Atemajac de Guadalajara. Bricio received the Medal of Sporting Merit from the Guadalajara city council for her achievements in the NORCECA Continental Championship and the Central American and Caribbean Games, and won an athletic scholarship.

=== 2011 ===
In March, Bricio helped Jalisco (her regional team) to qualify for the National Games. Playing again with Mexico's junior team in the first Junior Pan-American Cup, she contributed to the team's fourth-place finish and received the Best Scorer award. Bricio later played in the first Girls' Youth Pan-American Cup, winning a silver medal and the Best Scorer award. She played in the High Performance championship in Tucson, Arizona, and was scouted by several colleges before deciding to attend the University of Southern California.

Bricio represented Mexico at the 2011 Girls Youth World Championship, where her team finished twelfth after a 0–3 loss to Italy. She and several teammates joined the National Junior Olympic Program to develop players for the 2011 Pan American Games and the 2014 Central American and Caribbean Games.

In September Bricio played in the senior continental championship, guiding her team to a fifth-place finish. She later represented Mexico at the 2011 Pan American Games, where her team finished eighth after a 3–1 loss to Canada. Bricio said she felt excited, but pressured, about playing at home. She won a one-year athletic scholarship and her second Medal of Sporting Merit from the Guadalajara city council.

=== 2012 ===
Bricio helped Preparatoria de Universidad del Valle de Atemajac de Guadalajara win the Private High Schools National Championship, and was selected for the All-Star team. She received a full athletic scholarship to the University of Southern California after receiving 12 offers, leading the Trojans in August to a Texas A&M Invitational win and receiving the Most Valuable Player and Pac-12's Freshman of the Week awards. The Mexican Volleyball Federation used a machine translation of Bricio's performance during the Invitational, leading to several mistranslations.

After her first college season, Bricio was Volleyball Magazine's NCAA Freshman of the Year and made the All-America third team. The American Volleyball Coaches Association gave her an All-America honorable mention. Bricio was named to the Pac-12 All-Conference Team, the Pac-12 All-Freshman Team and the All-Pacific Region Team; she was named the AVCA Pacific Region and Pac-12 Freshman of the Year, and received the team's Best Scorer and Best Server awards. She represented Jalisco at the Mexican National Games (Olimpiada Nacional), winning the 17–18-year-old junior silver medal.

=== 2013 ===
Bricio began the year as #60 on the Smartasses Magazine Top 100 Sexiest Women List. She played in the 2013 Pan-American Cup with her U-20 national team as a warm-up for the 2013 FIVB Women's Junior World Championship, receiving the Best Scorer award. 25 May 2016

=== 2016 ===
While at USC, she won the Honda Sports Award as the nation's best collegiate female volleyball player in 2016.

Bricio played with the American Premier Volleyball League club Chesapeake Rising Tide from Chesapeake Bay at the 2016 league tournament held along the Open National Championships. She helped her team to win the bronze medal after they lost to Team Iowa Ice but defeated Great Lakes Lightning to achieve the third place.

She signed with the Italian league champion club Imoco Volley Conegliano for two years, starting in the 2016/17 season. She made the All-Star game selection and later won the Italian Supercup defeating 3–1 to Foppapedretti Bergamo, where she became Most Valuable Player after leading her team with 24 points.

=== 2017 ===
In the 2016–17 CEV Champions League, Bricio helped her team in the pool play against and Chemik Police, another victories in the Italian Cup and helping to retake the domestic league first place. After that, she was sidelined from playing in February when she got a virus, even though, her team won the Italian Cup.

She suffered a sprain during the second domestic league quarterfinals match, being unable to play the CEV Champions League Final Four hosted by her club, who claimed the silver medal.

== Clubs ==
- (Mexico) Jalisco (2009–2012)
- (United States) Chesapeake Rising Tide (2016)
- (Italy) Imoco Volley Conegliano (2016–2018)
- (Turkey) Fenerbahçe (2018–2019)
- (Italy) Savino Del Bene Scandicci (2019–2020)
- (Russia) Dinamo-Ak Bars (2020-2022 )
- (China) Shanghai Bright Ubest (2022–2023)
- (Turkey) Ílbank Spor Kulübü (2025-Presente)

== Awards ==
=== College ===
- 2012 Texas A&M Invitational Most Valuable Player
- 2012 AVCA All-America honorable mention
- 2012 AVCA Pacific Region Freshman of the Year
- 2012 Pac-12 Freshman of the Year
- 2012 All-Pacific Region Team
- 2012 Pac-12 All-Freshman Team
- 2012 Pac-12 All-Conference Team
- 2012 Volleyball Magazine's NCAA Freshman of the Year
- 2012 Volleyball Magazine's All-America third team
- 2015 AVCA National Player of the Year
- 2015 Volleyball Magazine's Player of the Year
- 2015 espnW National Volleyball Player of the Year
- 2015 PrepVolleyball.com National Player of the Year
- 2015 HERO Sport's National Volleyball Player of the Year
- 2016 Honda Sports Award for volleyball

=== Individuals ===
- 2008 NORCECA Junior Championship "Rising Star"
- 2010 NORCECA Youth Championship "Most valuable player"
- 2010 Central American and Caribbean Games "Best scorer"
- 2010 Central American and Caribbean Games "Best server"
- 2011 Youth Pan-American Cup "Best scorer"
- 2011 Junior Pan-American Cup "Best scorer"
- 2013 Pan-American Cup "Best scorer"
- 2016-17 Italian League "All-Star"
- 2016 Italian SuperCup "Most valuable player"

=== Clubs ===
- 2016 Premier Volleyball League – Bronze medal, with Chesapeake Rising Tide
- 2016 Italian SuperCup - Champion, with Imoco Volley
- 2016-17 Italian Cup - Champion, with Imoco Volley
- 2016–17 CEV Champions League - Runner-Up, with Imoco Volley Conegliano
- 2017-18 Italian League - Champion, with Imoco Volley Conegliano
- 2020 Russian Super Cup - Champion, with Dinamo-Ak Bars
- 2020 Russian Cup - Champion, with Dinamo-Ak Bars
