= 2011 Women's NORCECA Volleyball Championship =

Tournament details
- Host country: Puerto Rico
- Dates: September 12–17
- Teams: 9
- Venue: Coliseo Héctor Solá Bezares (in Caguas host cities)

Final positions
- Champions: United States (6th title)

Tournament awards
- MVP: (Dominican Republic) Bethania de la Cruz

The 2011 Women's NORCECA Volleyball Championship was held from September 12 to 17, in Caguas, Puerto Rico. The winner qualified for the 2011 FIVB Women's World Cup, in Japan.

== Competing nations ==
The following national teams have qualified:

Pool A	Pool B	Pool C
Puerto Rico; Costa Rica; Mexico	Canada; United States; Trinidad and Tobago	Dominican Republic; Panama; Cuba

== Pool standing procedure ==
Match won 3–0: 5 points for the winner, 0 point for the loser
Match won 3–1: 4 points for the winner, 1 points for the loser
Match won 3–2: 3 points for the winner, 2 points for the loser
In case of tie, the teams were classified according to the following criteria:
points ratio and sets ratio

== First round ==
=== Pool A ===
Pos	Team	Pld	W	L	Pts	SPW	SPL	SPR	SW	SL	SR	Qualification
1	Puerto Rico	2	2	0	10	153	90	1.700	6	0	MAX	Semifinals
2	Mexico	2	1	1	4	156	152	1.026	3	4	0.750	Quarterfinals
3	Costa Rica	2	0	2	1	104	171	0.608	1	6	0.167	7–9 Classification

Date	Time		Score		Set 1	Set 2	Set 3	Set 4	Set 5	Total	Report
12 Sep	20:00	Puerto Rico	3–0	Costa Rica	25–8	25–12	25–10			75–30	75–30
13 Sep	16:00	Costa Rica	1–3	Mexico	21–25	25–21	11–25	17–25		74–96	74–96
14 Sep	20:00	Mexico	0–3	Puerto Rico	16–25	18–25	26–28			60–78	60–78

=== Pool B ===
Pos	Team	Pld	W	L	Pts	SPW	SPL	SPR	SW	SL	SR	Qualification
1	United States	2	2	0	10	150	102	1.471	6	0	MAX	Quarterfinals
2	Canada	2	1	1	4	164	153	1.072	3	4	0.750	Quarterfinals
3	Trinidad and Tobago	2	0	2	1	119	178	0.669	1	6	0.167	7–9 Classification

Date	Time		Score		Set 1	Set 2	Set 3	Set 4	Set 5	Total	Report
12 Sep	17:00	Canada	3–1	Trinidad and Tobago	25–15	28–30	25–22	25–11		103–78	103–78
13 Sep	20:00	United States	3–0	Canada	25–19	25–19	25–23			75–61	P2 P3
14 Sep	16:00	Trinidad and Tobago	0–3	United States	14–25	16–25	11–25			41–75	41–75

=== Pool C ===
Pos	Team	Pld	W	L	Pts	SPW	SPL	SPR	SW	SL	SR	Qualification
1	Cuba	2	2	0	10	154	99	1.556	6	0	MAX	Semifinals
2	Dominican Republic	2	1	1	5	139	116	1.198	3	3	1.000	Quarterfinals
3	Panama	2	0	2	0	72	150	0.480	0	6	0.000	7–9 Classification

Date	Time		Score		Set 1	Set 2	Set 3	Set 4	Set 5	Total	Report
12 Sep	15:00	Dominican Republic	3–0	Panama	25–12	25–10	25–15			75–37	75–37
13 Sep	18:00	Panama	0–3	Cuba	13–25	15–25	7–25			35–75	35–75
14 Sep	18:00	Cuba	3–0	Dominican Republic	25–15	29–27	25–22			79–64	P2 P3

== Final round ==
=== Championship ===
Quarterfinals
Puerto Rico
Bye
15 Sep – Caguas
Dominican Republic	3
Canada	0
Cuba
Bye
15 Sep – Caguas
United States	3
Mexico	0

Semifinals
16 Sep – Caguas
Puerto Rico	0
Dominican Republic	3
16 Sep – Caguas
Cuba	0
United States	3

Final
17 Sep – Caguas
United States	3
Dominican Republic	0
Third place
17 Sep – Caguas
Cuba	3
Puerto Rico	0

=== Classification 7th–9th ===
Date	Time		Score		Set 1	Set 2	Set 3	Set 4	Set 5	Total	Report
15 Sep	16:00	Panama	1–3	Costa Rica	21–25	17–25	25–21	19–25		82–96	82–96

=== Quarterfinals ===
Date	Time		Score		Set 1	Set 2	Set 3	Set 4	Set 5	Total	Report
15 Sep	18:00	Dominican Republic	3–0	Canada	25–17	25–22	25–21			75–60	75–60
15 Sep	20:00	United States	3–0	Mexico	25–11	25–8	25–19			75–38	75–38

=== Classification 7th–8th ===
Date	Time		Score		Set 1	Set 2	Set 3	Set 4	Set 5	Total	Report
16 Sep	16:00	Trinidad and Tobago	3–0	Costa Rica	26–24	25–21	25–12			76–57	76–57

=== Semifinals ===
Date	Time		Score		Set 1	Set 2	Set 3	Set 4	Set 5	Total	Report
16 Sep	18:00	Cuba	0–3	United States	20–25	17–25	13–25			50–75	50–75
16 Sep	20:00	Puerto Rico	0–3	Dominican Republic	16–25	23–25	22–25			61–75	61–75

=== Classification 5th–6th ===
Date	Time		Score		Set 1	Set 2	Set 3	Set 4	Set 5	Total	Report
17 Sep	16:00	Mexico	3–1	Canada	22–25	25–23	25–18	25–22		97–88	97–88

=== Bronze medal match ===
Date	Time		Score		Set 1	Set 2	Set 3	Set 4	Set 5	Total	Report
17 Sep	18:00	Cuba	3–0	Puerto Rico	25–20	25–15	25–21			75–56	P2 P3

=== Final ===
Date	Time		Score		Set 1	Set 2	Set 3	Set 4	Set 5	Total	Report
17 Sep	20:00	United States	3–0	Dominican Republic	25–15	25–23	25–18			75–56	P2 P3

== Final standing ==
Rank	Team
1st place, gold medalist(s)	United States
2nd place, silver medalist(s)	Dominican Republic
3rd place, bronze medalist(s)	Cuba
4	Puerto Rico
5	Mexico
6	Canada
7	Trinidad and Tobago
8	Costa Rica
9	Panama

2011 Women's NORCECA champions

United States
6th title

== Individual awards ==
- MVP: (Dominican Republic) Bethania de la Cruz
- Best scorer: (Canada) Sarah Pavan
- Best spiker: (Cuba) Yanelis Santos
- Best blocker: (Canada) Marisa Field
- Best server: (United States) Logan Tom
- Best digger: (Dominican Republic) Brenda Castillo
- Best setter: (United States) Lindsey Berg
- Best receiver: (Dominican Republic) Brenda Castillo
- Best libero: (Dominican Republic) Brenda Castillo
- Eugenio George Laffita Award: (United States) Hugh McCutcheon
