= Jamaica women's national volleyball team =

National sports team

Jamaica
- Association: Jamaica Volleyball Association
- Confederation: NORCECA
- Head coach: Ricardo Chong
- FIVB ranking: NR (29 June 2025)

Uniforms
Home
- https://jamaicavolleyball.org
Honours
CAZOVA Caribbean Championship
Gold medal – first place	2023 Paramaribo

The Jamaica women's national volleyball team represents Jamaica in international women's volleyball competitions and friendly matches.

They compete at the Caribbean Volleyball Championship.

Recently, they placed second in the 2017 Caribbean Zonal Volleyball Association's (CAZOVA) Women's Championship held in Kingston, Jamaica. With a second-place finish, they qualified to compete in the 3rd round of the FIVB World Championship Qualifications, where they will play Guatemala, Puerto Rico, and Dominican Republic. The top two from this competition will qualify for the 2018 World Championships, hosted by Japan.

== Tournament record ==
=== CAZOVA Caribbean Championship ===
Champions Runners up Third place Fourth place

CAZOVA Caribbean Championship record
Year	Round	Position	Pld	W	L	SW	SL	Squad
(Suriname) 1991	Did not participate							
(Jamaica) 1992		3rd Place						Squad
(Trinidad and Tobago) 1993	Did not participate							
(Barbados) 1994	Event cancelled							
(Barbados) 1995	Did not participate							
(United States Virgin Islands) 1996		Runners Up						Squad
(Martinique) 1998		4th Place						Squad
(Barbados) 2000		3rd Place						Squad
(Trinidad and Tobago) 2002	Did not participate							
(Barbados) 2004	Final Round	Runners Up						Squad
(The Bahamas) 2006	Did not participate							
(Barbados) 2008	Final Round	3rd Place						Squad
(Suriname) 2010	Final Round	5th Place						Squad
(United States Virgin Islands) 2012	Final Round	4th Place						Squad
(Trinidad and Tobago) 2014	Final Round	Runners Up						Squad
(Jamaica) 2017	Final Round	Runners Up						Squad
(Suriname) 2018	Did not participate							
(Suriname) 2023	Final Round	Champions						Squad
Total	1 Titles	11/18						—

== Current squad ==
The following is the Jamaican roster for the 2023 CAZOVA Caribbean Championship:

Head coach: Ricardo Chong

No.	Position	Name	Date of birth	Height	2023 club
4	LIB	Chevonna Lewis	30 November 2000	1.68 m (5 ft 6 in)	
5	LIB	Danielle Watson	27 November 2000	1.66 m (5 ft 5 in)	
6	OH	Mychael Vernon	14 June 2002	1.80 m (5 ft 11 in)	(United States) Oregon State
10	SET	Alexandria Ashman	24 January 2001	1.70 m (5 ft 7 in)	
11	OH/OPP	Simone Asque-Favia	17 February 1990	1.78 m (5 ft 10 in)	
14	MB	Kristina Lumsden	26 June 1995	1.73 m (5 ft 8 in)	
16	MB	Yolanda Miller	20 December 1993	1.75 m (5 ft 9 in)	
17	OH	Erica Harris	10 December 1997	1.80 m (5 ft 11 in)	
20	MB/OPP	Sasha-Lee Thomas (c)	1 December 1995	1.90 m (6 ft 3 in)	
21	SET	Keshan Livingston	29 September 1997	1.80 m (5 ft 11 in)	
22	MB	Anesia Edwards	14 October 1998	1.75 m (5 ft 9 in)	
