= Saint Vincent and the Grenadines women's national volleyball team =

National sports team

Saint Vincent and the Grenadines
- Association: Saint Vincent and the Grenadines Volleyball Federation
- Confederation: NORCECA
- FIVB ranking: NR (24 May 2026)

Uniforms
Home

The Saint Vincent and the Grenadines women's national volleyball team represents Saint Vincent and the Grenadines in international women's volleyball competitions and friendly matches.
