= Bermuda women's national volleyball team =

National sports team

Bermuda
- Association: Bermuda Volleyball Federation
- Confederation: NORCECA
- FIVB ranking: 50 (24 May 2026)

Uniforms
Home

The Bermuda women's national volleyball team represents Bermuda in international women's volleyball competitions and friendly matches.
