= United States Virgin Islands women's national volleyball team =

National sports team

United States Virgin Islands
- Association: United States Virgin Islands Volleyball Federation
- Confederation: NORCECA
- FIVB ranking: NR (2 October 2026)

Uniforms
Home

The United States Virgin Islands women's national volleyball team represents the United States Virgin Islands in international women's volleyball competitions and friendly matches.

They compete at the NORCECA World Championship Qualification Tournament.
