= Bahamas women's national volleyball team =

National sports team

Bahamas
- Association: Bahamas Volleyball Federation
- Confederation: NORCECA
- Head coach: Covance Mortimer
- FIVB ranking: NR (29 June 2025)

Uniforms
Home	Away

The Bahamas women's national volleyball team represents the Bahamas in international women's volleyball competitions and friendly matches.

They compete at the Caribbean Volleyball Championship.

== Results ==
=== FIVB Volleyball Women's World Championship ===
- 1974 — 23rd place
