= Trinidad and Tobago women's national volleyball team =

National sports team

Trinidad and Tobago
- Association: Trinidad and Tobago Volleyball Federation (TTVF)
- Confederation: NORCECA
- Head coach: Francisco Cruz Jimenez
- FIVB ranking: 57 ▼1 (24 May 2026)

Uniforms
Home
- www.ttvf.org

The Trinidad and Tobago women's national volleyball team is the national team of Trinidad and Tobago.

== Results ==
=== FIVB Volleyball Women's World Championship ===
- 2018 — 23rd place
- 2022 — Did not qualify
- 2025 — Did not qualify

=== NORCECA Championship ===
- 2003 — 7th place
- 2005 — 8th place
- 2007 — 8th place
- 2009 — 8th place
- 2011 — 7th place
- 2013 — 6th place
- 2015 — 7th place
- 2019 — 8th place
- 2021 — 7th place
- 2023 — did not participate
- 2026 — 8th

=== Pan-American Cup ===
- 2007 — 12th place
- 2008 — 12th place
- 2009 — 10th place
- 2010 — 10th place
- 2011 — 10th place
- 2012 — 10th place
- 2013 — 10th place
- 2014 — 11th place
- 2015 — Did not enter
- 2016 — 10th place
- 2017 — 9th place
- 2018 — 11th place
- 2019 — 10th place

=== FIVB World Grand Prix ===
- 2017 — 31st

== Current squad ==
The following is the Trinidadian and Tobagonian roster in the 2018 World Championship.

Head coach: Francisco Cruz Jiménez

No.	Name	Date of birth	Height	Weight	Spike	Block	2017–18 club
2	Jalicia Ross	26 July 1984	1.85 m (6 ft 1 in)	72 kg (159 lb)	308 cm (121 in)	270 cm (110 in)	(Trinidad and Tobago) Glamorgan
3	Channon Thompson	29 March 1994	1.85 m (6 ft 1 in)	72 kg (159 lb)	315 cm (124 in)	303 cm (119 in)	(Turkey) Numune SK Ankara
4	Kelly-Anne Billingy	15 May 1986	1.90 m (6 ft 3 in)	87 kg (192 lb)	316 cm (124 in)	303 cm (119 in)	(Trinidad and Tobago) Technocrats
5	Delicia Pierre	11 October 1991	1.80 m (5 ft 11 in)	79 kg (174 lb)	301 cm (119 in)	285 cm (112 in)	(Trinidad and Tobago) West Side Stars
6	Sinead Jack	8 November 1993	1.98 m (6 ft 6 in)	82 kg (181 lb)	310 cm (120 in)	304 cm (120 in)	(Turkey) Galatasaray Istanbul
7	Kiune Fletcher	14 May 2002	1.81 m (5 ft 11 in)	64 kg (141 lb)	300 cm (120 in)	265 cm (104 in)	(Trinidad and Tobago) West Side Stars
8	Darlene Ramdin	5 August 1989	1.87 m (6 ft 2 in)	89 kg (196 lb)	286 cm (113 in)	281 cm (111 in)	(Philippines) Generika-Ayala Lifesavers
10	Taija Thomas	24 October 1996	1.83 m (6 ft 0 in)	66 kg (146 lb)	315 cm (124 in)	280 cm (110 in)	
11	Afesha Olton	22 May 1992	1.65 m (5 ft 5 in)	60 kg (130 lb)	200 cm (79 in)	185 cm (73 in)	(Trinidad and Tobago) UTT
12	Renele Forde (c)	6 August 1990	1.90 m (6 ft 3 in)	82 kg (181 lb)	304 cm (120 in)	295 cm (116 in)	(Sweden) Svedala Volley
15	Latisha Morain	28 June 1997	1.65 m (5 ft 5 in)	65 kg (143 lb)	185 cm (73 in)	175 cm (69 in)	(Trinidad and Tobago) UTT
16	Krystle Esdelle	1 August 1984	1.86 m (6 ft 1 in)	67 kg (148 lb)	329 cm (130 in)	299 cm (118 in)	(Turkey) Pursaklar Belediyesi

== See also ==
- Trinidad and Tobago men's national volleyball team
