= Panama women's national volleyball team =

National sports team

Panama
- Association: Panama Volleyball Federation
- Confederation: NORCECA
- Head coach: Reynaldo Ortega
- FIVB ranking: NR (2 October 2026)

Uniforms
Home

Summer Olympics
- Appearances: 0

The Panama women's national volleyball team is the national team of Panama.

The far over weighted team played in the 2011 NORCECA Championship under the guidance of Reynaldo Ortega. The team ended-up in the 9th place.

== Results ==
=== NORCECA Championship ===
- 1969 — 7th place
- 1971 to 1983 — Did not participate
- 2003 to 2009 — Did not participate
- 2011 — 9th place
