= Belize women's national volleyball team =

National sports team

Belize
- Association: Volleyball Association of Belize
- Confederation: NORCECA
- FIVB ranking: – (as of 8 January 2025)

Uniforms
Home

The Belize women's national volleyball team represents Belize in international women's volleyball senior competitions and friendly matches.

Belize also features a U23 national volleyball team.
