= Nicaragua women's national volleyball team =

National sports team

Nicaragua
- Association: Federación Nicaragüense de Vóleibol
- Confederation: NORCECA
- Head coach: Rene Quintana
- FIVB ranking: NR (29 June 2025)

Uniforms
Home

The Nicaragua women's national volleyball team represents Nicaragua in international women's volleyball competitions and friendly matches.

As of late 2021, it has been one of the top teams in Central America's AFECAVOL (Asociación de Federaciones CentroAmericanas de Voleibol) zone.

== Results ==
=== Central American and Caribbean Games ===
- 2010: 7th

== Squad ==
- 2010 Central American and Caribbean Games
- Head Coach: René Quintana

#	Name	Date of birth	Height	Weight	Spike	Block
1	Jaqueline Toruño	22.04.1989	176	67	289	260
3	Maryuri Torres	09.12.1993	170	48	265	256
4	Hellen Traña	03.05.1983	180	76	285	273
5	Josafat Díaz	12.11.1993	174	64	265	258
6	Lolette Rodríguez	04.08.1989	171	66	282	271
7	Amalia Hernández García	22.11.1988	172	57	283	272
8	Johana Padilla	20.08.1979	180	80	281	277
9	Claudia Noguera (c)	30.06.1979	171	66	278	267
12	Bertha Fierro	24.10.1984	176	62	285	274
13	Hada Solórzano	23.08.1993	158	48	238	235
14	Claudia Machado	28.10.1991	164	50	258	249
15	María Izquierdo Arce	23.09.1988	163	67	259	250
