= Guatemala women's national volleyball team =

National sports team

Guatemala
- Association: Federación Guatemalteca de Voleibol
- Confederation: NORCECA
- Head coach: Leivys García
- FIVB ranking: NR (29 June 2025)

Uniforms
Home

The Guatemala women's national volleyball team represents Guatemala in international women's volleyball competitions and friendly matches.

In late 2021, Guatemala competed in Central America's AFECAVOL (Asociación de Federaciones CentroAmericanas de Voleibol) zone.

== Squad ==
- 2010 Central American and Caribbean Games
- Head Coach: Leivys García

| # | Name | Date of birth | Height | Weight | Spike | Block |
|---|---|---|---|---|---|---|
| 1 | Íngrid López Guerra | 19.06.1987 | 161 | 52 | 263 | 240 |
| 2 | Lourdes Parellada | 22.03.1989 | 181 | 90 | 283 | 275 |
| 3 | Blanca Recinos | 08.03.1991 | 173 | 60 | 281 | 260 |
| 4 | Rut Beatriz Gomes | 24.04.1991 | 183 | 70 | 290 | 280 |
| 5 | Julianne Burmester | 09.03.1984 | 183 | 70 | 290 | 235 |
| 6 | Jemilyn Flores | 14.12.1992 | 176 | 63 | 282 | 270 |
| 7 | Diana Arias Azurdia | 09.05.1984 | 168 | 63 | 281 | 272 |
| 8 | Walda Maldonado | 03.03.1986 | 158 | 54 | 250 | 240 |
| 9 | Andrea Díaz Celada | 15.10.1989 | 168 | 70 | 283 | 276 |
| 10 | María Estrada Santizo | 11.08.1992 | 170 | 64 | 285 | 276 |
| 11 | Tiffany Villafranco | 28.10.1993 | 170 | 58 | 286 | 278 |
| 12 | Aneliesse Burmester (c) | 15.03.1983 | 170 | 75 | 283 | 276 |
