= 2006 FIVB Women's Volleyball World Championship =

Volleyball competition held in Japan

2006 FIVB Women's World Championship
バレーボール女子世界選手権 日本 2006

Tournament details
- Host country: Japan
- Dates: 31 October – 16 November
- Teams: 24
- Venues: 6 (in 5 host cities)
- Officially opened by: Akihito

Final positions
- Champions: Russia (6th title)
- Runners-up: Brazil
- Third place: Serbia and Montenegro
- Fourth place: Italy

Tournament awards
- MVP: (Japan) Yoshie Takeshita
- Best Setter: (Japan) Yoshie Takeshita
- Best OH: (Cuba) Rosir Calderón
- Best MB: (Germany) Christiane Fürst
- Best Libero: (Serbia and Montenegro) Suzana Ćebić
- Best Scorer: (Turkey) Neslihan Darnel
- Best Server: (Russia) Yelena Godina
- Best Digger: (Chinese Taipei) Szu Hui-Fang
- Best Receiver: (Brazil) Jaqueline Carvalho

The 2006 FIVB Women's World Championship was the fifteenth edition of the competition, contested by the senior women's national teams of the members of the Fédération Internationale de Volleyball (FIVB), the sport's global governing body. The final tournament was held from 31 October to 16 November 2006 in Japan.

The finals involved 24 teams, of which 22 came through qualifying competitions, while the host nation and reign champion qualified automatically. Of the 32 teams, 16 had also appeared in the previous tournament in 2002, while Cameroon, Costa Rica, Kazakhstan, Turkey and Serbia and Montenegro made their first appearances at a FIVB Women's Volleyball World Championship.

Russia won their sixth world title, defeating Brazil in five sets at the final. Serbia and Montenegro won the 3rd place match and its first medal, defeating Italy in straight sets. Yoshie Takeshita from Japan was selected as the MVP.

== Qualification ==
Team	Confederation	Qualified as	Qualified on	Appearance in finals
Japan	AVC	Host		13th
Italy	CEV	2002 World Championship Winner	18 September 2002	8th
Egypt	CAVB	CAVB Pool A Winner	19 March 2005	3rd
Cameroon	CAVB	CAVB Pool C Winner	24 April 2005	1st
Germany	CEV	CEV Pool I Winner	19 June 2005	12th^{1}
Serbia and Montenegro	CEV	CEV Pool I Runner-up	19 June 2005	2nd^{2}
Azerbaijan	CEV	CEV Pool G Winner	2 July 2005	2nd
Russia	CEV	CEV Pool G Runner-up	2 July 2005	14th^{3}
Kenya	CAVB	CAVB Pool B Winner	24 July 2005	4th
South Korea	AVC	AVC Pool B Winner	4 August 2005	10th
Kazakhstan	AVC	AVC Pool B Runner-up	4 August 2005	1st
China	AVC	AVC Pool A Winner	6 August 2005	11th
Chinese Taipei	AVC	AVC Pool A Runner-up	6 August 2005	2nd
Netherlands	CEV	CEV Pool H Winner	6 August 2005	11th
Turkey	CEV	CEV Pool H Runner-up	6 August 2005	1st
United States	NORCECA	NORCECA Pool D Winner	18 August 2005	13th
Puerto Rico	NORCECA	NORCECA Pool D Runner-up	18 August 2005	4th
Mexico	NORCECA	NORCECA Pool D Third	19 August 2005	6th
Poland	CEV	CEV Playoff round Winner	21 August 2005	9th
Dominican Republic	NORCECA	NORCECA Pool E Runner-up	26 August 2005	5th
Cuba	NORCECA	NORCECA Pool E Winner	27 August 2005	10th
Costa Rica	NORCECA	NORCECA Pool E Third	28 August 2005	1st
Brazil	CSV	CSV Pool A Winner	28 August 2005	13th
Peru	CSV	CSV Pool A Runner-up	28 August 2005	11th

1.Competed as West Germany from 1956 to 1990; 4th appearance as Germany.
2.Competed as Yugoslavia from 1978 to 1990; 1st appearance as Serbia and Montenegro.
3.Competed as Soviet Union from 1952 to 1990; 4th appearance as Russia.

Source:FIVB

== Venues ==
Pool A	Pool F, Final round	Final round	Host cities in Japan
Tokyo	Osaka		Host cities in Japan
Yoyogi National Gymnasium	Osaka Municipal Central Gymnasium	Osaka Prefectural Gymnasium	Host cities in Japan
Capacity: 12,000	Capacity: 8,200	Capacity: 5,000	Host cities in Japan
Pool C	Pool D, E	Pool B	Host cities in Japan
Kobe	Nagoya	Sapporo	Host cities in Japan
Kobe Green Arena	Nagoya Rainbow Hall	Hokkaido Prefectural Sports Center	Host cities in Japan
Capacity: 6,000	Capacity: 8,000	Capacity: 7,000	Host cities in Japan

== Format ==
The tournament was played in three different stages (first, second and final rounds). In the First round, the 24 participants were divided in four groups of six teams each. A single round-robin format was played within each group to determine the teams group position, the four best teams of each group (total of 16 teams) progressed to the next round.

In the Second round, the 16 teams were divided in two groups of eight teams. A single round-robin format was played within each group to determine the teams group position, matches already played between teams in the First round were counted in this round. The six best teams of each group (total of 12 teams) progressed to the next round.

In the Final round, the 12 teams were allocated to semifinals for placement matches according to their Second round group positions. First and second of each group played the semifinals, third and fourth played the 5th-8th semifinals and fifth and sixth played the 9th-12th semifinals. Winners and losers of each semifinals played a final placement match for 1st to 12th places.

Source:FIVB

== Pools composition ==
The drawing of lots for the qualified teams took place in Tokyo, Japan on 29 November 2005.

Pool A	Pool B	Pool C	Pool D
Chinese Taipei	Azerbaijan	Brazil	Cuba
Costa Rica	China	Cameroon	Egypt
Japan	Dominican Republic	Kazakhstan	Italy
Kenya	Germany	Netherlands	Peru
Poland	Mexico	Puerto Rico	Serbia and Montenegro
South Korea	Russia	United States	Turkey

== Results ==
All times are Japan Standard Time (UTC+09:00).

=== First round ===
==== Pool A ====
Venue: Yoyogi National Gymnasium, Tokyo

Pos	Team	Pld	W	L	Pts	SW	SL	SR	SPW	SPL	SPR	Qualification
1	Chinese Taipei	5	5	0	10	15	4	3.750	455	371	1.226	Second round
2	Japan	5	4	1	9	13	5	2.600	437	354	1.234	Second round
3	Poland	5	3	2	8	11	10	1.100	483	455	1.062	Second round
4	South Korea	5	2	3	7	11	9	1.222	458	404	1.134	Second round
5	Costa Rica	5	1	4	6	4	14	0.286	303	425	0.713	
6	Kenya	5	0	5	5	3	15	0.200	311	438	0.710	

Date	Time		Score		Set 1	Set 2	Set 3	Set 4	Set 5	Total	Report
31 Oct	12:00	South Korea	3–0	Costa Rica	25–16	25–15	25–17			75–48	P2 P3
31 Oct	14:00	Poland	3–1	Kenya	25–15	25–17	20–25	25–20		95–77	P2 P3
31 Oct	18:00	Chinese Taipei	3–1	Japan	18–25	25–18	25–19	25–23		93–85	P2 P3
1 Nov	13:00	Kenya	0–3	Chinese Taipei	13–25	9–25	27–29			49–79	P2 P3
1 Nov	15:00	South Korea	2–3	Poland	21–25	25–23	24–26	25–23	12–15	107–112	P2 P3
1 Nov	18:00	Costa Rica	0–3	Japan	9–25	11–25	14–25			34–75	P2 P3
3 Nov	13:00	Chinese Taipei	3–2	South Korea	26–24	16–25	29–27	24–26	15–10	110–112	P2 P3
3 Nov	15:35	Poland	3–1	Costa Rica	25–17	20–25	25–11	25–14		95–67	P2 P3
3 Nov	18:00	Japan	3–0	Kenya	25–15	25–17	25–10			75–42	P2 P3
4 Nov	13:00	Costa Rica	3–2	Kenya	19–25	23–25	25–16	32–30	15–9	114–105	P2 P3
4 Nov	15:35	Poland	1–3	Chinese Taipei	19–25	18–25	25–23	23–25		85–98	P2 P3
4 Nov	18:05	South Korea	1–3	Japan	21–25	25–21	21–25	22–25		89–96	P2 P3
5 Nov	13:00	Chinese Taipei	3–0	Costa Rica	25–10	25–18	25–12			75–40	P2 P3
5 Nov	15:00	Kenya	0–3	South Korea	13–25	13–25	12–25			38–75	P2 P3
5 Nov	18:00	Japan	3–1	Poland	25–22	30–28	26–28	25–18		106–96	P2 P3

==== Pool B ====
Venue: Hokkaido Prefectural Sports Center, Sapporo

Pos	Team	Pld	W	L	Pts	SW	SL	SR	SPW	SPL	SPR	Qualification
1	Russia	5	5	0	10	15	4	3.750	451	361	1.249	Second round
2	Germany	5	4	1	9	13	4	3.250	413	354	1.167	Second round
3	China	5	3	2	8	11	7	1.571	413	378	1.093	Second round
4	Azerbaijan	5	2	3	7	8	10	0.800	406	391	1.038	Second round
5	Dominican Republic	5	1	4	6	5	12	0.417	348	392	0.888	
6	Mexico	5	0	5	5	0	15	0.000	220	375	0.587	

Date	Time		Score		Set 1	Set 2	Set 3	Set 4	Set 5	Total	Report
31 Oct	14:00	Dominican Republic	0–3	Germany	17–25	16–25	21–25			54–75	P2 P3
31 Oct	16:00	Mexico	0–3	Russia	8–25	11–25	10–25			29–75	P2 P3
31 Oct	18:00	China	3–1	Azerbaijan	25–23	24–26	25–16	25–22		99–87	P2 P3
1 Nov	14:00	Azerbaijan	1–3	Russia	19–25	21–25	25–19	20–25		85–94	P2 P3
1 Nov	16:20	Germany	3–0	Mexico	25–18	25–21	25–19			75–58	P2 P3
1 Nov	18:10	China	3–0	Dominican Republic	25–19	25–17	25–23			75–59	P2 P3
3 Nov	14:00	Dominican Republic	1–3	Azerbaijan	25–21	21–25	21–25	14–25		81–96	P2 P3
3 Nov	16:20	Russia	3–1	Germany	25–22	25–21	17–25	25–23		92–91	P2 P3
3 Nov	18:45	Mexico	0–3	China	20–25	10–25	12–25			42–75	P2 P3
4 Nov	14:00	China	1–3	Russia	25–20	23–25	17–25	12–25		77–95	P2 P3
4 Nov	16:15	Azerbaijan	0–3	Germany	25–27	18–25	20–25			63–77	P2 P3
4 Nov	18:00	Dominican Republic	3–0	Mexico	25–20	25–19	25–12			75–51	P2 P3
5 Nov	14:00	Germany	3–1	China	20–25	25–18	25–21	25–23		95–87	P2 P3
5 Nov	16:25	Mexico	0–3	Azerbaijan	14–25	10–25	16–25			40–75	P2 P3
5 Nov	18:00	Russia	3–1	Dominican Republic	25–17	20–25	25–18	25–19		95–79	P2 P3

==== Pool C ====
Venue: Kobe Green Arena, Kobe

Pos	Team	Pld	W	L	Pts	SW	SL	SR	SPW	SPL	SPR	Qualification
1	Brazil	5	5	0	10	15	2	7.500	411	287	1.432	Second round
2	United States	5	4	1	9	12	7	1.714	430	373	1.153	Second round
3	Netherlands	5	3	2	8	13	8	1.625	466	440	1.059	Second round
4	Puerto Rico	5	2	3	7	6	10	0.600	334	381	0.877	Second round
5	Kazakhstan	5	1	4	6	8	12	0.667	420	442	0.950	
6	Cameroon	5	0	5	5	0	15	0.000	237	375	0.632	

Date	Time		Score		Set 1	Set 2	Set 3	Set 4	Set 5	Total	Report
31 Oct	14:00	Brazil	3–0	Puerto Rico	25–21	25–15	25–18			75–54	P2 P3
31 Oct	16:00	Netherlands	3–0	Cameroon	25–16	25–17	25–18			75–51	P2 P3
31 Oct	18:00	United States	3–2	Kazakhstan	19–25	25–19	25–19	26–28	16–14	111–105	P2 P3
1 Nov	14:00	Kazakhstan	0–3	Brazil	17–25	13–25	16–25			46–75	P2 P3
1 Nov	16:00	Cameroon	0–3	Puerto Rico	17–25	23–25	20–25			60–75	P2 P3
1 Nov	18:00	Netherlands	2–3	United States	19–25	22–25	29–27	25–20	7–15	102–112	P2 P3
3 Nov	14:00	Brazil	3–2	Netherlands	25–18	23–25	23–25	25–18	15–9	111–95	P2 P3
3 Nov	16:25	Puerto Rico	3–1	Kazakhstan	25–23	22–25	25–20	25–23		97–91	P2 P3
3 Nov	18:40	United States	3–0	Cameroon	25–17	25–18	25–11			75–46	P2 P3
4 Nov	14:00	United States	0–3	Brazil	23–25	21–25	13–25			57–75	P2 P3
4 Nov	16:00	Cameroon	0–3	Kazakhstan	20–25	13–25	12–25			45–75	P2 P3
4 Nov	18:00	Netherlands	3–0	Puerto Rico	30–28	25–17	25–18			80–63	P2 P3
5 Nov	14:00	Brazil	3–0	Cameroon	25–13	25–14	25–8			75–35	P2 P3
5 Nov	16:00	Puerto Rico	0–3	United States	14–25	16–25	15–25			45–75	P2 P3
5 Nov	18:00	Kazakhstan	2–3	Netherlands	18–25	29–27	18–25	25–22	13–15	103–114	P2 P3

==== Pool D ====
Venue: Nagoya Rainbow Hall, Nagoya

Pos	Team	Pld	W	L	Pts	SW	SL	SR	SPW	SPL	SPR	Qualification
1	Serbia and Montenegro	5	5	0	10	15	4	3.750	464	388	1.196	Second round
2	Italy	5	4	1	9	13	4	3.250	415	315	1.317	Second round
3	Cuba	5	3	2	8	11	8	1.375	432	388	1.113	Second round
4	Turkey	5	2	3	7	6	11	0.545	368	359	1.025	Second round
5	Peru	5	1	4	6	9	12	0.750	419	447	0.937	
6	Egypt	5	0	5	5	0	15	0.000	174	375	0.464	

Date	Time		Score		Set 1	Set 2	Set 3	Set 4	Set 5	Total	Report
31 Oct	14:00	Peru	3–0	Egypt	25–19	25–6	25–13			75–38	P2 P3
31 Oct	16:00	Turkey	0–3	Cuba	20–25	25–27	21–25			66–77	P2 P3
31 Oct	18:00	Italy	1–3	Serbia and Montenegro	18–25	22–25	25–19	25–27		90–96	P2 P3
1 Nov	14:00	Egypt	0–3	Turkey	11–25	13–25	8–25			32–75	P2 P3
1 Nov	16:00	Serbia and Montenegro	3–1	Cuba	25–22	22–25	25–20	25–23		97–90	P2 P3
1 Nov	18:15	Italy	3–0	Peru	25–15	25–16	25–14			75–45	P2 P3
3 Nov	14:00	Peru	2–3	Serbia and Montenegro	25–23	25–21	20–25	16–25	23–25	109–119	P2 P3
3 Nov	16:40	Cuba	3–0	Egypt	25–9	25–9	25–15			75–33	P2 P3
3 Nov	18:00	Turkey	0–3	Italy	23–25	17–25	14–25			54–75	P2 P3
4 Nov	14:00	Serbia and Montenegro	3–0	Egypt	25–9	25–13	25–15			75–37	P2 P3
4 Nov	16:00	Peru	2–3	Turkey	27–25	18–25	25–21	19–25	9–15	98–111	P2 P3
4 Nov	18:30	Italy	3–1	Cuba	25–27	25–19	25–21	25–19		100–86	P2 P3
5 Nov	14:00	Turkey	0–3	Serbia and Montenegro	25–27	22–25	15–25			62–77	P2 P3
5 Nov	16:00	Cuba	3–2	Peru	22–25	25–16	17–25	25–16	15–10	104–92	P2 P3
5 Nov	18:25	Egypt	0–3	Italy	17–25	7–25	10–25			34–75	P2 P3

=== Second round ===
The results and the points of the matches between the same teams that were already played during the first round are taken into account for the second round.

==== Pool E ====
Venue: Nagoya Rainbow Hall, Nagoya

Pos	Team	Pld	W	L	Pts	SW	SL	SR	SPW	SPL	SPR	Qualification
1	Italy	7	6	1	13	19	4	4.750	568	448	1.268	Finals
2	Serbia and Montenegro	7	6	1	13	20	7	2.857	628	563	1.115	Finals
3	Cuba	7	5	2	12	17	7	2.429	578	532	1.086	5th–8th places
4	Japan	7	4	3	11	14	14	1.000	652	644	1.012	5th–8th places
5	Chinese Taipei	7	3	4	10	12	16	0.750	574	636	0.903	9th–12th places
6	Turkey	7	2	5	9	7	16	0.438	493	540	0.913	9th–12th places
7	South Korea	7	1	6	8	8	18	0.444	552	592	0.932	
8	Poland	7	1	6	8	5	20	0.250	524	614	0.853	

Date	Time		Score		Set 1	Set 2	Set 3	Set 4	Set 5	Total	Report
8 Nov	11:00	South Korea	0–3	Serbia and Montenegro	23–25	19–25	22–25			64–75	P2 P3
8 Nov	13:00	Poland	0–3	Italy	19–25	22–25	13–25			54–75	P2 P3
8 Nov	15:00	Chinese Taipei	1–3	Turkey	17–25	16–25	25–21	17–25		75–96	P2 P3
8 Nov	18:00	Japan	1–3	Cuba	25–22	23–25	22–25	22–25		92–97	P2 P3
9 Nov	11:00	Poland	0–3	Serbia and Montenegro	15–25	22–25	14–25			51–75	P2 P3
9 Nov	13:00	Chinese Taipei	0–3	Cuba	21–25	20–25	14–25			55–75	P2 P3
9 Nov	15:00	South Korea	0–3	Italy	18–25	19–25	13–25			50–75	P2 P3
9 Nov	18:00	Japan	3–1	Turkey	30–28	22–25	25–21	25–17		102–91	P2 P3
11 Nov	11:00	Chinese Taipei	0–3	Italy	15–25	13–25	14–25			42–75	P2 P3
11 Nov	13:00	South Korea	0–3	Cuba	19–25	14–25	22–25			55–75	P2 P3
11 Nov	15:00	Poland	0–3	Turkey	18–25	22–25	19–25			59–75	P2 P3
11 Nov	18:00	Japan	3–2	Serbia and Montenegro	18–25	22–25	25–18	25–21	15–11	105–100	P2 P3
12 Nov	11:00	Poland	0–3	Cuba	18–25	26–28	23–25			67–78	P2 P3
12 Nov	13:00	Chinese Taipei	2–3	Serbia and Montenegro	22–25	26–24	25–19	15–25	13–15	101–108	P2 P3
12 Nov	15:30	South Korea	3–0	Turkey	25–14	25–13	25–22			75–49	P2 P3
12 Nov	18:00	Japan	0–3	Italy	17–25	26–28	23–25			66–78	P2 P3

==== Pool F ====
Venue: Osaka Municipal Central Gymnasium, Osaka

Pos	Team	Pld	W	L	Pts	SW	SL	SR	SPW	SPL	SPR	Qualification
1	Brazil	7	7	0	14	21	5	4.200	628	517	1.215	Finals
2	Russia	7	6	1	13	19	6	3.167	596	512	1.164	Finals
3	Netherlands	7	4	3	11	16	13	1.231	620	646	0.960	5th–8th places
4	China	7	3	4	10	15	14	1.071	648	642	1.009	5th–8th places
5	Germany	7	3	4	10	14	13	1.077	609	606	1.005	9th–12th places
6	United States	7	3	4	10	12	16	0.750	605	608	0.995	9th–12th places
7	Azerbaijan	7	2	5	9	8	17	0.471	549	585	0.938	
8	Puerto Rico	7	0	7	7	0	21	0.000	394	533	0.739	

Date	Time		Score		Set 1	Set 2	Set 3	Set 4	Set 5	Total	Report
8 Nov	12:00	Russia	3–0	Puerto Rico	25–16	25–10	25–20			75–46	P2 P3
8 Nov	14:00	Germany	2–3	Netherlands	25–23	21–25	23–25	25–23	14–16	108–112	P2 P3
8 Nov	16:45	Azerbaijan	0–3	Brazil	19–25	21–25	23–25			63–75	P2 P3
8 Nov	18:35	China	3–1	United States	20–25	25–23	25–22	25–17		95–87	P2 P3
9 Nov	12:00	Russia	3–0	Netherlands	25–17	25–18	25–16			75–51	P2 P3
9 Nov	14:00	Germany	3–0	Puerto Rico	25–23	25–22	25–22			75–67	P2 P3
9 Nov	16:00	China	2–3	Brazil	26–24	25–20	21–25	16–25	17–19	105–113	P2 P3
9 Nov	18:45	Azerbaijan	3–2	United States	25–19	16–25	25–22	25–27	15–13	106–106	P2 P3
11 Nov	12:00	Russia	3–0	United States	25–20	25–21	25–17			75–58	P2 P3
11 Nov	14:00	Germany	0–3	Brazil	16–25	22–25	15–25			53–75	P2 P3
11 Nov	16:00	China	3–0	Puerto Rico	28–26	25–14	25–22			78–62	P2 P3
11 Nov	18:00	Azerbaijan	0–3	Netherlands	24–26	22–25	24–26			70–77	P2 P3
12 Nov	12:00	Russia	1–3	Brazil	29–27	14–25	25–27	22–25		90–104	P2 P3
12 Nov	14:25	Germany	2–3	United States	27–25	23–25	25–19	24–26	11–15	110–110	P2 P3
12 Nov	17:00	China	2–3	Netherlands	25–21	25–17	23–25	22–25	12–15	107–103	P2 P3
12 Nov	19:45	Azerbaijan	3–0	Puerto Rico	25–21	25–18	25–18			75–57	P2 P3

=== Final round ===
==== 9th–12th place ====
Venue: Osaka Prefectural Gymnasium, Osaka

9th–12th semifinals
15 November
Chinese Taipei	0
United States	3
15 November
Germany	1
Turkey	3

9th place
16 November
United States	3
Turkey	1
11th place
16 November
Chinese Taipei	0
Germany	3

===== 9th–12th semifinals =====
Date	Time		Score		Set 1	Set 2	Set 3	Set 4	Set 5	Total	Report
15 Nov	14:00	Chinese Taipei	0–3	United States	15–25	20–25	21–25			56–75	P2 P3
15 Nov	18:20	Germany	1–3	Turkey	25–23	16–25	20–25	25–27		86–100	P2 P3

===== 11th place match =====
Date	Time		Score		Set 1	Set 2	Set 3	Set 4	Set 5	Total	Report
16 Nov	13:00	Chinese Taipei	0–3	Germany	15–25	19–25	15–25			49–75	P2 P3

===== 9th place match =====
Date	Time		Score		Set 1	Set 2	Set 3	Set 4	Set 5	Total	Report
16 Nov	15:00	United States	3–1	Turkey	25–22	23–25	25–17	25–16		98–80	P2 P3

==== 5th–8th place ====
Venues: Osaka Municipal Central Gymnasium (OMCG) and Osaka Prefectural Gymnasium (OPG), both in Osaka

5th–8th semifinals
15 November
Cuba	1
China	3
15 November
Netherlands	1
Japan	3

5th place
16 November
China	3
Japan	0
7th place
16 November
Cuba	3
Netherlands	0

===== 5th–8th semifinals =====
Date	Time	Venue		Score		Set 1	Set 2	Set 3	Set 4	Set 5	Total	Report
15 Nov	16:00	OPG	Cuba	1–3	China	24–26	21–25	28–26	20–25		93–102	93–102
15 Nov	19:00	OMCG	Netherlands	1–3	Japan	21–25	27–25	21–25	21–25		90–100	90–100

===== 7th place match =====
Date	Time	Venue		Score		Set 1	Set 2	Set 3	Set 4	Set 5	Total	Report
16 Nov	17:00	OPG	Cuba	3–0	Netherlands	25–22	25–16	25–23			75–61	75–61

===== 5th place match =====
Date	Time	Venue		Score		Set 1	Set 2	Set 3	Set 4	Set 5	Total	Report
16 Nov	18:00	OMCG	China	3–0	Japan	25–19	25–22	25–22			75–63	75–63

==== Finals ====
Venue: Osaka Municipal Central Gymnasium, Osaka

Semifinals
15 November
Italy	0
Russia	3
15 November
Brazil	3
Serbia and Montenegro	1

Final
16 November
Russia	3
Brazil	2
3rd place
16 November
Italy	0
Serbia and Montenegro	3

===== Semifinals =====
Date	Time		Score		Set 1	Set 2	Set 3	Set 4	Set 5	Total	Report
15 Nov	14:00	Brazil	3–1	Serbia and Montenegro	25–17	25–14	21–25	25–20		96–76	P2 P3
15 Nov	16:15	Italy	0–3	Russia	19–25	16–25	20–25			55–75	P2 P3

===== 3rd place match =====
Date	Time		Score		Set 1	Set 2	Set 3	Set 4	Set 5	Total	Report
16 Nov	12:00	Italy	0–3	Serbia and Montenegro	22–25	22–25	21–25			65–75	P2 P3

===== Final =====
Date	Time		Score		Set 1	Set 2	Set 3	Set 4	Set 5	Total	Report
16 Nov	14:30	Russia	3–2	Brazil	15–25	25–23	25–18	20–25	15–13	100–104	P2 P3

== Final standing ==
Rank	Team
1st place, gold medalist(s)	Russia
2nd place, silver medalist(s)	Brazil
3rd place, bronze medalist(s)	Serbia and Montenegro
4	Italy
5	China
6	Japan
7	Cuba
8	Netherlands
9	United States
10	Turkey
11	Germany
12	Chinese Taipei
13	South Korea
13	Azerbaijan
15	Poland
15	Puerto Rico
17	Peru
17	Dominican Republic
17	Kazakhstan
17	Costa Rica
21	Kenya
21	Mexico
21	Egypt
21	Cameroon

2006 Women's World champions

Russia
6th title

Team Roster
Marina Akulova, Maria Borodakova, Maria Bruntseva, Yekaterina Gamova, Yelena Godina, Svetlana Kryuchkova, Natalia Kulikova, Yulia Merkulova, Natalia Safronova, Lioubov Shashkova, Marina Sheshenina, Olga Zhitova
Head coach
Giovanni Caprara

== Awards ==
- Most valuable player
  (Japan) Yoshie Takeshita
- Best scorer
  (Turkey) Neslihan Darnel
- Best spiker
  (Cuba) Rosir Calderón
- Best blocker
  (Germany) Christiane Fürst
- Best server
  (Russia) Yelena Godina
- Best digger
  Szu Hui-Fang
- Best receiver
  (Brazil) Jaqueline Carvalho
- Best setter
  (Japan) Yoshie Takeshita
- Best libero
  (Serbia and Montenegro) Suzana Ćebić

== Statistics leaders ==
The statistics of each group follows the vis reports P2 and P3. The statistics include 6 volleyball skills; serve, reception, set, spike, block, and dig. The table below shows the top 5 ranked players in each skill plus top scorers as of 16 November 2006.

=== Best Scorers ===
Best scorers determined by scored points from attack, block, and serve.

	Player	Attacks	Blocks	Serves	Total
1	(Turkey) Neslihan Darnel	190	21	14	225
2	(Germany) Angelina Grün	176	31	13	220
3	(China) Wang Yimei	165	17	20	202
4	(Russia) Ekaterina Gamova	152	32	6	190
5	(United States) Nancy Metcalf	160	16	9	185

=== Best Spikers ===
Best attackers determined by successful attacks in percentage.

	Player	Spikes	Faults	Shots	Total	%
1	(Cuba) Rosir Calderon Diaz	148	35	65	248	59.68
2	(Russia) Lioubov Shashkova	150	27	88	265	56.60
3	(Cuba) Nancy Carrillo De La Paz	126	29	70	225	56.00
4	(Cuba) Yumilka Ruiz Luaces	123	33	89	245	50.20
5	(Italy) Simona Rinieri-Dennis	93	24	71	188	49.47

=== Best Blockers ===
Best blockers determined by the average of stuff blocks per set.

	Player	Blocks	Faults	Rebounds	Total	Avg
1	(Germany) Christiane Fürst	35	45	98	178	0.88
2	(Brazil) Oliveira Walewska	34	40	76	150	0.83
3	(Russia) Ekaterina Gamova	32	27	47	106	0.80
4	(Germany) Angelina Grün	31	38	46	115	0.78
5	(United States) Heather Bown	32	39	87	158	0.74

=== Best Servers ===
Best servers determined by the average of aces per set.

	Player	Aces	Faults	Hits	Total	Avg
1	(Russia) Elena Godina	28	26	133	187	0.70
2	(China) Wang Yimei	20	24	134	178	0.48
3	(China) Yang Hao	15	12	143	170	0.36
4	(Turkey) Neslihan Darnel	14	27	105	146	0.36
5	(Germany) Angelina Grün	13	13	115	141	0.33

=== Best Setters ===
Best setters determined by the average of running sets per set.

	Player	Running	Faults	Still	Total	Avg
1	(Japan) Yoshie Takeshita	436	2	644	1082	10.63
2	(China) Feng Kun	389	9	552	950	9.26
3	(Turkey) Elif Agca	307	17	578	902	7.87
4	(United States) Robyn Ah Mow-Santos	323	4	681	1008	7.51
5	(Italy) Eleonora Lo Bianco	262	2	548	812	7.49

=== Best Diggers ===
Best diggers determined by the average of successful digs per set.

	Player	Digs	Faults	Receptions	Total	Avg
1	(Chinese Taipei) Szu Hui Fang	116	73	102	291	2.90
2	(Turkey) Gulden Kayalar	105	57	62	224	2.69
3	(Italy) Paola Cardullo	91	35	58	184	2.60
4	(Brazil) Fabiana Alvim de Oliveira	106	55	108	269	2.59
5	(Japan) Sugayama Kaoru	106	60	68	234	2.59

=== Best Receivers ===
Best receivers determined by efficient receptions in percentage.

	Player	Excellents	Faults	Serve	Total	%
1	(Brazil) Jaqueline Carvalho	149	4	58	211	68.72
2	(China) Zhou Suhong	215	11	92	318	64.15
3	(Russia) Lioubov Shashkova	128	7	55	190	63.68
4	(Brazil) Welissa Gonzaga	120	3	62	185	63.24
5	(Italy) Francesca Piccinini	112	6	51	169	62.72

== See also ==
- 2006 FIVB Men's Volleyball World Championship
