= Volleyball Ireland =

Irish national volleyball association

Volleyball Ireland, branded as VLY., officially the Volleyball Association of Ireland, is the governing body of volleyball, including beach volleyball and spikeball, of the Republic of Ireland. It has traded as Volleyball Ireland since 2018. It is funded by the Irish Sports Council, and is a member of the Olympic Federation of Ireland, and the European Volleyball Confederation, including the Small Countries Association. Northern Ireland Volleyball, which operates in Northern Ireland, is part of the British Volleyball Federation.

== International Events ==
The association has hosted European Volleyball Confederation events, in the Small Nations Division, and at under-age levels, including the 2024 Women's U20 Volleyball European Championship.

== Competitions ==
The association manages the Irish Women's Volleyball League, Men's Premier Division, as well as National Cup competitions.

The association organises varsity sports in conjunction with Student Sport Ireland.

== Sources ==
- "Ireland and Olympism" (PDF). Olympic Review (70–71): 431–443. September–October 1973. Archived from the original (PDF) on 9 August 2010.
