= 2006 FIVB Women's Volleyball World Championship qualification =

24 teams competed in the 2006 FIVB Women's Volleyball World Championship, with two places allocated for the hosts, Japan and the titleholder, Italy. In the qualification process for the 2006 FIVB World Championship, the Five FIVB confederations were allocated a share of the 22 remaining spots.

== Qualified teams ==
Team	Confederation	Qualified as	Qualified on	Appearance in finals
Japan	AVC	Host		13th
Italy	CEV	2002 World Championship Winner	18 September 2002	8th
Egypt	CAVB	CAVB Pool A Winner	19 March 2005	3rd
Cameroon	CAVB	CAVB Pool C Winner	24 April 2005	1st
Germany	CEV	CEV Pool I Winner	19 June 2005	12th^{1}
Serbia and Montenegro	CEV	CEV Pool I Runner-up	19 June 2005	2nd^{2}
Azerbaijan	CEV	CEV Pool G Winner	2 July 2005	2nd
Russia	CEV	CEV Pool G Runner-up	2 July 2005	14th^{3}
Kenya	CAVB	CAVB Pool B Winner	24 July 2005	4th
South Korea	AVC	AVC Pool B Winner	4 August 2005	10th
Kazakhstan	AVC	AVC Pool B Runner-up	4 August 2005	1st
China	AVC	AVC Pool A Winner	6 August 2005	11th
Chinese Taipei	AVC	AVC Pool A Runner-up	6 August 2005	2nd
Netherlands	CEV	CEV Pool H Winner	6 August 2005	11th
Turkey	CEV	CEV Pool H Runner-up	6 August 2005	1st
United States	NORCECA	NORCECA Pool D Winner	18 August 2005	13th
Puerto Rico	NORCECA	NORCECA Pool D Runner-up	18 August 2005	4th
Mexico	NORCECA	NORCECA Pool D Third	19 August 2005	6th
Poland	CEV	CEV Playoff round Winner	21 August 2005	9th
Dominican Republic	NORCECA	NORCECA Pool E Runner-up	26 August 2005	5th
Cuba	NORCECA	NORCECA Pool E Winner	27 August 2005	10th
Costa Rica	NORCECA	NORCECA Pool E Third	28 August 2005	1st
Brazil	CSV	CSV Pool A Winner	28 August 2005	13th
Peru	CSV	CSV Pool A Runner-up	28 August 2005	11th

1. Competed as West Germany from 1956 to 1990; 4th appearance as Germany.
2. Competed as Yugoslavia from 1978 to 1990; 1st appearance as Serbia and Montenegro.
3. Competed as Soviet Union from 1952 to 1990; 4th appearance as Russia.

== Confederation qualification processes ==
The distribution by confederation for the 2006 FIVB Women's Volleyball World Championship was:

- Asia and Oceania (AVC): 4 places (+ Japan qualified automatically as host nation for a total of 5 places)
- Africa (CAVB): 3 places
- Europe (CEV): 7 places (+ Italy qualified automatically as the defending champions for a total of 8 places)
- South America (CSV) 2 places
- North, Central America and Caribbean (NORCECA): 6 places

=== AVC ===
- Australia (First Round)
- China (First Round)
- Chinese Taipei (First Round)
- Jordan (First Round)
- Kazakhstan (First Round)
- Philippines (First Round)
- South Korea (First Round)
- Tonga (First Round)
- Thailand (First Round)
- Uzbekistan (First Round)

=== CAVB ===
- Algeria (First Round)
- Botswana (First Round)
- Cameroon (First Round)
- Congo (First Round)
- DR Congo (First Round)
- Egypt (First Round)
- Eritrea (First Round)
- Kenya (First Round)
- Mauritius (First Round)
- Nigeria (First Round)
- South Africa (First Round)
- Tunisia (First Round)
- Uganda (First Round)

=== CEV ===
- Albania (First Round)
- Austria (First Round)
- Azerbaijan (Second Round, Third Round)
- Belarus (First Round, Second Round)
- Belgium (First Round, Second Round, Third Round)
- Bosnia and Herzegovina (First Round)
- Bulgaria (Third Round, Playoff Round)
- Croatia (Second Round)
- Czech Republic (Second Round, Third Round)
- England (First Round)
- Finland (First Round)
- France (First Round, Second Round)
- Germany (Third Round)
- Greece (Second Round, Third Round)
- Netherlands (Third Round)
- Norway (First Round)
- Poland (Third Round, Playoff Round)
- Portugal (First Round)
- Romania (Second Round)
- Russia (Third Round)
- Scotland (First Round)
- Serbia and Montenegro (First Round, Second Round, Third Round)
- Slovakia (Second Round)
- Slovenia (First Round)
- Spain (First Round, Second Round)
- Turkey (Third Round)
- Ukraine (Second Round, Third Round, Playoff Round)

=== CSV ===
- Argentina (First Round)
- Brazil (First Round)
- Ecuador (First Round)
- Peru (First Round)
- Uruguay (First Round)

=== NORCECA ===
- Anguilla (First Round)
- Barbados (First Round, Second Round)
- British Virgin Islands (First Round)
- Canada (Second Round)
- Cayman Islands (First Round)
- Costa Rica (Second Round)
- Cuba (Second Round)
- Dominica (First Round)
- Dominican Republic (Second Round)
- Guatemala (First Round, Second Round)
- Honduras (First Round)
- Jamaica (First Round, Second Round)
- Mexico (First Round, Second Round)
- Netherlands Antilles (First Round)
- Nicaragua (First Round)
- Panama (First Round)
- Puerto Rico (Second Round)
- Saint Kitts and Nevis (First Round)
- United States (Second Round)
