= Irish Women's Volleyball League =

- Current season, competition or edition: 2022–23
- Sport: Volleyball
- Founded: 1972
- First season: 1972
- No. of teams: 8 Teams
- Country: Ireland
- Continent: Europe
- Domestic cups: Irish Cup; Irish Super Cup
- International cups: CEV Champions League; CEV Cup; CEV Challenge Cup

The Irish Women's Volleyball Championship is an annual competition for Irish women's volleyball teams and has been held since the year 1972. Competitions are held in three divisions - Premier League, Division 1 and Division 2. The championships are organized by the Volleyball Association of Ireland.

== Competition formula (Premier League) ==
In the championship all teams hold a two-round tournament, the results of which determine the final ranking. For 3:0 and 3:1 wins teams get 3 points, 3:2 win - 2 points, for 2:3 defeats - 1 point, for 1:3 and 0:3 defeats no points are awarded. There were eight teams in the 2021/22 Premier League championship: "The Guardians (Talla), UCD (Dublin), Suntree Calypso (Dublin), Dublin Lions, Nees Cobras (Nees), TCD (Dublin), Suntree -2 (Dublin), Galway. The Guardians won the championship title, 2nd place went to UCD, and 3rd place went to Suntree Calypso. The 2020/21 championship was cancelled.

== List of winners ==
- 1972 Fekls Street
- 1973 Not played
- 1974 Not played
- 1975 Not played
- 1976 Not played
- 1977 Midleton VC
- 1978 Midleton VC
- 1979 Not played
- 1980 Midleton VC
- 1981 Midleton VC
- 1982 Midleton VC
- 1983 Dunlaoire
- 1984 Midleton VC
- 1985 Not played
- 1986 Midleton VC
- 1987 Dunlaoire
- 1988 Dunlaoire
- 1989 Dunlaoire
- 1990 Dunlaoire
- 1991 Reebok
- 1992 Artane
- 1993 Aer Lingus VC
- 1994 Sporting Greystones
- 1995 Sporting Greystones
- 1996 East Coast Cruisers
- 1997 East Coast Cruisers
- 1998 East Coast Cruisers
- 1999 East Coast Cruisers
- 2000 East Coast Cruisers
- 2001 East Coast Cruisers
- 2002 East Coast Cruisers
- 2003 Santry VC
- 2004 UCD Team
- 2005 UCD Team
- 2006 Newbridge VC
- 2007 Newbridge VC
- 2008 Aer Lingus VC
- 2009 Aer Lingus VC
- 2010 Aer Lingus VC
- 2011 Aer Lingus VC
- 2012 Aer Lingus VC
- 2013 Santry VC
- 2014 Dublin VC
- 2015 UCD Team
- 2016 Dublin VC
- 2017 Galway VC
- 2018 Garda VC
- 2019 Garda VC
- 2020 Cancelled
- 2021 Cancelled
- 2022 Guardians
- 2023 TBD
