= 2006 FIVB Women's Volleyball World Championship qualification (CEV) =

The CEV qualification for the 2006 FIVB Women's Volleyball World Championship saw member nations compete for seven places at the finals in Japan.

== Draw ==
27 CEV national teams entered qualification. The teams were distributed according to their position in the FIVB Senior Women's Rankings as of 15 January 2004 using the serpentine system for their distribution. (Rankings shown in brackets) Teams ranked 1–6 did not compete in the first and second rounds, and automatically qualified for the third round. Teams ranked 7–12 did not compete in the first round, and automatically qualified for the second round.

First round

Pool A	Pool B	Pool C
England (—); Scotland (—); Serbia and Montenegro (39); Albania (—); Spain (39)	Portugal (47); Slovenia (47); Austria (—); Slovakia (—); Belarus (47)	Norway (58); Finland (47); France (58); Bosnia and Herzegovina (—); Belgium (—)

Second round

Pool D	Pool E	Pool F
Romania (20); Azerbaijan (39); 1st Pool A 2nd Pool C	Greece (22); Ukraine (29); 1st Pool C 2nd Pool B	Croatia (24); Czech Republic (27); 1st Pool B 2nd Pool A

Third round

Pool G	Pool H	Pool I
Russia (5); Bulgaria (15); 1st Pool D 2nd Pool F	Netherlands (9); Turkey (12); 1st Pool E 2nd Pool D	Poland (10); Germany (11); 1st Pool F 2nd Pool E

Playoff round

3rd Pool G
3rd Pool H
3rd Pool I

== First round ==
=== Pool A ===
- Venue: English Institute of Sport, Sheffield, England
- Dates: January 12–16, 2005
- All times are Greenwich Mean Time (UTC±00:00)

Pos	Team	Pld	W	L	Pts	SW	SL	SR	SPW	SPL	SPR
1	Spain	4	4	0	8	12	1	12.000	317	210	1.510
2	Serbia and Montenegro	4	3	1	7	10	3	3.333	318	223	1.426
3	Albania	4	2	2	6	6	6	1.000	258	247	1.045
4	England	4	1	3	5	3	9	0.333	225	288	0.781
5	Scotland	4	0	4	4	0	12	0.000	151	301	0.502

Date	Time		Score		Set 1	Set 2	Set 3	Set 4	Set 5	Total	Report
12 Jan	14:00	England	0–3	Serbia and Montenegro	11–25	22–25	23–25			56–75	Report
12 Jan	16:00	Scotland	0–3	Albania	14–25	10–25	16–25			40–75	Report
13 Jan	16:00	Serbia and Montenegro	3–0	Scotland	25–7	25–4	25–12			75–23	Report
13 Jan	19:30	England	0–3	Spain	10–25	10–25	16–25			36–75	Report
14 Jan	14:00	Albania	0–3	Serbia and Montenegro	15–25	20–25	17–25			52–75	Report
14 Jan	16:00	Scotland	0–3	Spain	7–25	9–25	9–25			25–75	Report
15 Jan	14:00	Spain	3–0	Albania	25–23	25–11	25–22			75–56	Report
15 Jan	16:00	England	3–0	Scotland	25–18	26–24	25–21			76–63	Report
16 Jan	14:00	Serbia and Montenegro	1–3	Spain	25–15	25–27	23–25	20–25		93–92	Report
16 Jan	16:00	England	0–3	Albania	16–25	23–25	18–25			57–75	Report

=== Pool B ===
- Venue: Pavilhão Desportivo Municipal, Santo Tirso, Portugal
- Dates: May 4–8, 2005
- All times are Western European Summer Time (UTC+01:00)

Pos	Team	Pld	W	L	Pts	SW	SL	SR	SPW	SPL	SPR
1	Slovakia	4	4	0	8	12	4	3.000	382	301	1.269
2	Belarus	4	3	1	7	10	5	2.000	355	319	1.113
3	Slovenia	4	2	2	6	9	6	1.500	309	305	1.013
4	Austria	4	1	3	5	4	9	0.444	252	297	0.848
5	Portugal	4	0	4	4	1	12	0.083	248	324	0.765

Date	Time		Score		Set 1	Set 2	Set 3	Set 4	Set 5	Total	Report
04 May	16:00	Belarus	3–1	Slovenia	22–25	25–14	25–16	25–21		97–76	Report
04 May	18:30	Slovakia	3–1	Portugal	25–22	23–25	25–20	25–13		98–80	Report
05 May	16:00	Slovenia	2–3	Slovakia	26–24	14–25	9–25	25–21	9–15	83–110	Report
05 May	18:30	Austria	1–3	Belarus	25–19	20–25	24–26	15–25		84–95	Report
06 May	15:00	Slovakia	3–0	Austria	25–10	25–23	25–18			75–51	Report
06 May	17:00	Portugal	0–3	Slovenia	15–25	21–25	20–25			56–75	Report
07 May	10:30	Austria	3–0	Portugal	25–20	25–15	25–17			75–52	Report
07 May	15:00	Belarus	1–3	Slovakia	17–25	26–24	22–25	22–25		87–99	Report
08 May	15:00	Slovenia	3–0	Austria	25–17	25–9	25–16			75–42	Report
08 May	17:00	Portugal	0–3	Belarus	18–25	18–25	24–26			60–76	Report

=== Pool C ===
- Venue: Palais Omnisports Joseph Claudel, Saint-Dié-des-Vosges, France
- Dates: April 27 – May 1, 2005
- All times are Central European Summer Time (UTC+02:00)

Pos	Team	Pld	W	L	Pts	SW	SL	SR	SPW	SPL	SPR
1	France	4	4	0	8	12	2	6.000	336	252	1.333
2	Belgium	4	3	1	7	11	3	3.667	324	236	1.373
3	Finland	4	2	2	6	6	7	0.857	282	278	1.014
4	Norway	4	1	3	5	3	10	0.300	235	304	0.773
5	Bosnia and Herzegovina	4	0	4	4	2	12	0.167	226	333	0.679

Date	Time		Score		Set 1	Set 2	Set 3	Set 4	Set 5	Total	Report
27 Apr	18:30	Bosnia and Herzegovina	1–3	Norway	25–14	18–25	17–25	19–25		79–89	Report
27 Apr	21:00	Finland	0–3	Belgium	12–25	21–25	20–25			53–75	Report
28 Apr	18:30	France	3–0	Finland	25–23	25–18	25–19			75–60	Report
28 Apr	21:00	Belgium	3–0	Norway	25–12	25–18	25–10			75–40	Report
29 Apr	18:30	France	3–2	Belgium	19–25	25–15	23–25	25–17	19–17	111–99	Report
29 Apr	21:00	Finland	3–1	Bosnia and Herzegovina	25–23	25–14	19–25	25–13		94–75	Report
30 Apr	18:30	France	3–0	Bosnia and Herzegovina	25–15	25–16	25–9			75–40	Report
30 Apr	21:00	Finland	3–0	Norway	25–19	25–13	25–21			75–53	Report
01 May	18:30	France	3–0	Norway	25–21	25–15	25–17			75–53	Report
01 May	21:00	Belgium	3–0	Bosnia and Herzegovina	25–14	25–7	25–11			75–32	Report

== Second round ==
=== Pool D ===
- Venue: Sports Palace, Baku, Azerbaijan
- Dates: May 27–29, 2005
- All times are Azerbaijan Summer Time (UTC+05:00)

Pos	Team	Pld	W	L	Pts	SW	SL	SR	SPW	SPL	SPR
1	Azerbaijan	3	3	0	6	9	2	4.500	282	234	1.205
2	Belgium	3	2	1	5	7	4	1.750	268	254	1.055
3	Romania	3	1	2	4	5	6	0.833	244	256	0.953
4	Spain	3	0	3	3	0	9	0.000	178	228	0.781

Date	Time		Score		Set 1	Set 2	Set 3	Set 4	Set 5	Total	Report
27 May	16:00	Belgium	3–1	Romania	25–17	25–22	20–25	25–19		95–83	Report
27 May	18:30	Azerbaijan	3–0	Spain	25–21	25–18	25–14			75–53	Report
28 May	16:00	Romania	3–0	Spain	25–23	25–20	25–21			75–64	Report
28 May	18:30	Azerbaijan	3–1	Belgium	35–37	25–23	25–17	25–18		110–95	Report
29 May	16:00	Spain	0–3	Belgium	26–28	17–25	18–25			61–78	Report
29 May	18:30	Azerbaijan	3–1	Romania	25–16	21–25	25–21	26–24		97–86	Report

=== Pool E ===
- Venue: Makis Liougas Indoor Hall, Athens, Greece
- Dates: June 10–12, 2005
- All times are Eastern European Summer Time (UTC+03:00)

Pos	Team	Pld	W	L	Pts	SW	SL	SR	SPW	SPL	SPR
1	Ukraine	3	3	0	6	9	5	1.800	225	141	1.596
2	Greece	3	1	2	4	5	6	0.833	217	243	0.893
3	France	3	1	2	4	4	8	0.500	242	271	0.893
4	Belarus	3	1	2	4	3	7	0.429	208	237	0.878

Date	Time		Score		Set 1	Set 2	Set 3	Set 4	Set 5	Total	Report
10 Jun	18:00	Ukraine	3–0	France	25–19	25–17	25–11			75–47	Report
10 Jun	21:00	Greece	3–0	Belarus	25–19	25–22	25–19			75–60	Report
11 Jun	18:00	France	1–3	Belarus	25–27	25–19	19–25	18–25		87–96	Report
11 Jun	21:00	Ukraine	3–0	Greece	25–15	25–8	25–19			75–42	Report
12 Jun	18:00	Belarus	0–3	Ukraine	13–25	16–25	23–25			52–75	Report
12 Jun	21:00	Greece	2–3	France	18–25	19–25	25–20	25–23	13–15	100–108	Report

=== Pool F ===
- Venue: Dom odbojke, Zagreb, Croatia
- Dates: June 11–13, 2005
- All times are Central European Summer Time (UTC+02:00)

Pos	Team	Pld	W	L	Pts	SW	SL	SR	SPW	SPL	SPR
1	Serbia and Montenegro	3	3	0	6	9	1	9.000	250	204	1.225
2	Czech Republic	3	2	1	5	6	3	2.000	204	194	1.052
3	Slovakia	3	1	2	4	4	7	0.571	241	258	0.934
4	Croatia	3	0	3	3	1	9	0.111	218	257	0.848

Date	Time		Score		Set 1	Set 2	Set 3	Set 4	Set 5	Total	Report
11 Jun	17:00	Czech Republic	0–3	Serbia and Montenegro	17–25	15–25	18–25			50–75	Report
11 Jun	19:30	Croatia	1–3	Slovakia	25–23	27–29	13–25	19–25		84–102	Report
12 Jun	17:00	Slovakia	0–3	Czech Republic	18–25	9–25	23–25			50–75	Report
12 Jun	19:30	Serbia and Montenegro	3–0	Croatia	26–24	25–22	25–19			76–65	Report
13 Jun	16:00	Croatia	0–3	Czech Republic	24–26	19–25	26–28			69–79	Report
13 Jun	18:30	Slovakia	1–3	Serbia and Montenegro	17–25	26–28	25–21	21–25		89–99	Report

== Third round ==
=== Pool G ===
- Venue: Dynamo Sports Palace, Moscow, Russia
- Dates: July 1–3, 2005
- All times are Moscow Daylight Time (UTC+04:00)

Pos	Team	Pld	W	L	Pts	SW	SL	SR	SPW	SPL	SPR
1	Azerbaijan	3	3	0	6	9	1	9.000	245	198	1.237
2	Russia	3	2	1	5	7	4	1.750	250	226	1.106
3	Bulgaria	3	1	2	4	4	7	0.571	250	266	0.940
4	Czech Republic	3	0	3	3	1	9	0.111	198	253	0.783

Date	Time		Score		Set 1	Set 2	Set 3	Set 4	Set 5	Total	Report
01 Jul	16:00	Bulgaria	0–3	Azerbaijan	22–25	23–25	22–25			67–75	Report
01 Jul	18:30	Russia	3–0	Czech Republic	25–16	25–14	25–21			75–51	Report
02 Jul	15:00	Azerbaijan	3–0	Czech Republic	25–17	25–18	25–20			75–55	Report
02 Jul	17:30	Russia	3–1	Bulgaria	25–14	25–18	24–26	25–22		99–80	Report
03 Jul	15:00	Bulgaria	3–1	Czech Republic	23–25	26–24	29–27	25–16		103–92	Report
03 Jul	17:30	Azerbaijan	3–1	Russia	20–25	25–18	25–22	25–11		95–76	Report

=== Pool H ===
- Venue: Atatürk Sport Hall, Ankara, Turkey
- Dates: August 5–7, 2005
- All times are Eastern European Summer Time (UTC+03:00)

Pos	Team	Pld	W	L	Pts	SW	SL	SR	SPW	SPL	SPR
1	Netherlands	3	3	0	6	9	3	3.000	282	231	1.221
2	Turkey	3	2	1	5	6	6	1.000	251	257	0.977
3	Ukraine	3	1	2	4	6	8	0.750	312	322	0.969
4	Belgium	3	0	3	3	5	9	0.556	304	339	0.897

Date	Time		Score		Set 1	Set 2	Set 3	Set 4	Set 5	Total	Report
05 Aug	16:30	Ukraine	1–3	Netherlands	24–26	17–25	25–17	21–25		87–93	Report
05 Aug	19:00	Belgium	1–3	Turkey	18–25	19–25	26–24	20–25		83–99	Report
06 Aug	16:30	Netherlands	3–2	Belgium	25–20	21–25	24–26	25–8	19–17	114–96	Report
06 Aug	19:00	Turkey	3–2	Ukraine	26–24	17–25	21–25	25–15	15–10	104–99	Report
07 Aug	16:30	Ukraine	3–2	Belgium	25–27	22–25	25–23	37–35	17–15	126–125	Report
07 Aug	19:00	Turkey	0–3	Netherlands	23–25	12–25	13–25			48–75	Report

=== Pool I ===
- Venue: MZH, Dresden, Germany
- Dates: June 17–19, 2005
- All times are Central European Summer Time (UTC+02:00)

Pos	Team	Pld	W	L	Pts	SW	SL	SR	SPW	SPL	SPR
1	Germany	3	2	1	5	8	4	2.000	273	251	1.088
2	Serbia and Montenegro	3	2	1	5	8	5	1.600	280	254	1.102
3	Poland	3	2	1	5	7	5	1.400	264	254	1.039
4	Greece	3	0	3	3	0	9	0.000	167	225	0.742

Date	Time		Score		Set 1	Set 2	Set 3	Set 4	Set 5	Total	Report
17 Jun	17:30	Poland	3–0	Greece	25–23	25–20	25–22			75–65	Report
17 Jun	20:00	Germany	2–3	Serbia and Montenegro	31–29	23–25	17–25	25–17	7–15	103–111	Report
18 Jun	15:30	Serbia and Montenegro	2–3	Poland	25–15	25–21	11–25	20–25	13–15	94–101	Report
18 Jun	18:30	Greece	0–3	Germany	18–25	20–25	14–25			52–75	Report
19 Jun	10:30	Serbia and Montenegro	3–0	Greece	25–18	25–13	25–19			75–50	Report
19 Jun	13:00	Germany	3–1	Poland	25–22	20–25	25–19	25–22		95–88	Report

== Playoff round ==
- Venue: DKS Arena, Varna, Bulgaria
- Dates: August 19–21, 2005
- All times are Eastern European Summer Time (UTC+03:00)

Pos	Team	Pld	W	L	Pts	SW	SL	SR	SPW	SPL	SPR
1	Poland	2	2	0	4	6	2	3.000	173	143	1.210
2	Bulgaria	2	1	1	3	5	5	1.000	210	204	1.029
3	Ukraine	2	0	2	2	2	6	0.333	152	188	0.809

Date	Time		Score		Set 1	Set 2	Set 3	Set 4	Set 5	Total	Report
19 Aug	20:30	Ukraine	2–3	Bulgaria	17–25	25–27	30–28	25–18	9–15	106–113	Report
20 Aug	15:30	Poland	3–0	Ukraine	25–17	25–14	25–15			75–46	Report
21 Aug	20:30	Bulgaria	2–3	Poland	25–17	25–16	15–25	20–25	12–15	97–98	Report
