= Yoshie Takeshita =

Japanese volleyball player (born 1978)

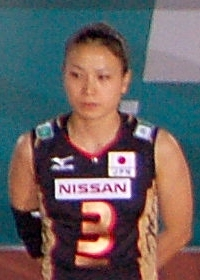
- Takeshita in 2007

Personal information
- Nickname: Tenn
- Born: March 18, 1978 (age 48); Kitakyushu city, Fukuoka, Japan
- Height: 159 cm (5 ft 3 in)
- Weight: 53 kg (117 lb)
- Spike: 280 cm (110 in)
- Block: 270 cm (106 in)

Volleyball information
- Position: Setter
- Current club: Retired

National team
| Japan (1997-2012) |
Medal record
Women's volleyball
Representing Japan
Olympic Games
| Bronze medal – third place | 2012 London | Team |
World Championship
| Bronze medal – third place | 2010 Japan | Team |
Asian Games
| Silver medal – second place | 2006 Doha | Team |
Asian Championship
| Gold medal – first place | 2007 Suphanburi | Team |
| Silver medal – second place | 2003 Ho Chi Minh City | Team |
| Silver medal – second place | 2011 Taipei | Team |
| Bronze medal – third place | 2005 Taicang | Team |
| Bronze medal – third place | 2009 Hanoi | Team |

Yoshie Takeshita (竹下 佳江 Takeshita Yoshie, born March 18, 1978) is a retired Japanese volleyball player who played for JT Marvelous. She served as the head coach of Japanese volleyball team Victorina Himeji. and now serves as Executive Adviser.

Takeshita played for the All-Japan women's volleyball team and was a participant at the 2004 Summer Olympics, 2008 Summer Olympics and 2012 Olympics. At the 2012 Olympics, she was part of the Japanese team that won the bronze medal. She was also part of the 2010 Japanese Women's team that won bronze at the world championships, beating the US in the bronze medal match.

Takeshita's nickname was World's smallest and strongest setter (世界 最小 最強 セッター Sekai saisho saikyo setter). She was the captain of the Japanese volleyball team during the 2006 World Championship and took the most valuable player award.

On 28 September 2012, JT Marvelous announced her retirement. On 21 June 2013 Takeshita was selected to become a member of the directors of Japan Volleyball Association.

== Personal life ==
Takeshita's husband is Japanese baseball player Hirotaka Egusa.

== Trivia ==
- She became a volleyball player at 10 years old.
- Her nickname is "Tenn", though she has not publicly revealed the meaning or origin of the nickname.

== Clubs ==
- (Japan) Shiranuijoshi High School
- (Japan) NEC Red Rockets (1996–2002)
- (Japan) JT Marvelous (2002-2012)

== Awards ==
=== Individual ===
- 2003 Asian Championship "Best Setter"
- 2004 Olympic Qualifier "Best Setter"
- 2006 World Championship "Most Valuable Player"
- 2006 World Championship "Best Setter"
- 2008 Olympic Qualifier "Best Setter"
- 2008 FIVB World Grand Prix "Best Setter"
- 2009 FIVB World Grand Prix "Best Setter"
- 2011 Asian Championship "Best Setter"
- 2011 World Cup "Best Setter"

=== Team ===
- 1998 4th V.League - Runner-Up, with NEC Red Rockets.
- 2000 6th V.League - Champion, with NEC Red Rockets.
- 2001 Kurowashiki All Japan Volleyball Championship - Champion, with NEC Red Rockets.
- 2002 8th V.League - Runner-Up, with NEC Red Rockets.
- 2003 Kurowashiki All Japan Volleyball Championship - Runner-Up, with JT Marvelous.
- 2004 Kurowashiki All Japan Volleyball Championship - Runner-Up, with JT Marvelous.
- 2006-2007 V.Premier League - Runner-Up, with JT Marvelous.
- 2007 Kurowashiki All Japan Volleyball Championship - Runner-Up, with JT Marvelous.
- 2009-2010 V.Premier League - Runner-Up, with JT Marvelous.
- 2010 Kurowashiki All Japan Volleyball Tournament - Runner-Up, with JT Marvelous.
- 2010-2011 V.Premier League - Champion, with JT Marvelous.
- 2011 Kurowashiki All Japan Volleyball Tournament - Champion, with JT Marvelous.

=== National team ===
==== Senior team ====
- 2003: Silver Medal in the 12th Senior Asian Championship
- 2003: 5th place in the World Cup
- 2004: 5th place in the Olympic Games of Athens
- 2005: 5th place in the World Grand Prix Final round
- 2005: Bronze Medal in the 13th Senior Asian Championship
- 2006: 6th place in the World Grand Prix Final round
- 2006: 6th place in the World Championship
- 2006: Silver Medal in Asian Games of Doha
- 2007: 7th place in the World Cup
- 2007: Gold Medal in the 14th Senior Asian Championship
- 2008: 6th place in the World Grand Prix Final round
- 2008: 5th place in the Olympic Games of Beijing
- 2009: 6th place in the World Grand Prix Final round
- 2009: Bronze Medal in the 15th Senior Asian Championship
- 2010: 5th place in the World Grand Prix Final round
- 2010: Bronze Medal in the World Championship
- 2011: 5th place in the World Grand Prix Final round
- 2011: Silver Medal in the 16th Senior Asian Championship
- 2011: 4th place in the World Cup
- 2012: Bronze Medal in the Olympic Games of London

Awards
| Preceded by (Italy) Elisa Togut | Most Valuable Player of FIVB World Championship; 2006 | Succeeded by (Russia) Yekaterina Gamova |
| Preceded by (Brazil) Marcelle Rodrigues | Best Setter of FIVB World Championship; 2006 | Succeeded by (China) Wei Qiuyue |
| Preceded by (China) Wei Qiuyue | Best Setter of FIVB World Grand Prix; 2008, 2009 | Succeeded by (United States) Alisha Glass |
