= Volleyball at the 2005 Bolivarian Games – Women's tournament =

This article shows the women's tournament for the 2005 Bolivarian Games, held from August 13 to 18, 2005 at the Mayor Coliseum in Pereira, Colombia. Peru won the gold medal over Venezuela and Colombia won the bronze over Ecuador.

== Competing nations ==
Colombia
Ecuador
Peru
Venezuela

== Preliminary round ==
Pos	Team	Pld	W	L	Pts	SPW	SPL	SPR	SW	SL	SR
1	Peru	3	2	1	5	281	233	1.206	8	4	2.000
2	Venezuela	3	2	1	5	287	256	1.121	8	5	1.600
3	Colombia	3	2	1	5	276	255	1.082	7	5	1.400
4	Ecuador	3	0	3	3	125	225	0.556	0	9	0.000

August 13, 2005; 17:00	Peru	2–3	Venezuela	Attendance: 56; Referees: Jorge Erazo (COL)
August 13, 2005; 17:00	(26–28, 18–25, 25–20, 25–13, 10–15)			Attendance: 56; Referees: Jorge Erazo (COL)

August 13, 2005; 19:00	Colombia	3–0	Ecuador	Referees: Rocio Huarcaya
August 13, 2005; 19:00	(25–17, 25–16, 25–9)			Referees: Rocio Huarcaya

August 14, 2005; 15:00	Venezuela	3–0	Ecuador	Referees: Jorge Erazo (COL)
August 14, 2005; 15:00	(25–12, 25–15, 25–11)			Referees: Jorge Erazo (COL)

August 14, 2005; 19:00	Colombia	1–3	Peru	Referees: Brigido Brito
August 14, 2005; 19:00	(25–22, 15–25, 19–25, 28–30)			Referees: Brigido Brito

August 15, 2005; 15:00	Ecuador	0–3	Peru	Referees: Omar Castro
August 15, 2005; 15:00	(16–25, 13–25, 16–25)			Referees: Omar Castro

August 15, 2005; 17:00	Colombia	3–2	Venezuela	Referees: Rocio Huarcaya
August 15, 2005; 17:00	(25–20, 25–18, 16–25, 23–25, 25–23)			Referees: Rocio Huarcaya

== Final round ==
Semi-finals
2005-08-16 – Pereira, Colombia
Peru	3
Ecuador	0
2005-08-16 – Pereira, Colombia
Colombia	1
Venezuela	3

Final
2005-08-17 – Pereira, Colombia
Venezuela	1
Peru	3
3rd place
2005-08-17 – Pereira, Colombia
Colombia	3
Ecuador	0

=== Semifinals ===
August 16, 2005; 15:00	Peru	3–0	Ecuador	Referees: Jorge Erazo (COL)
August 16, 2005; 15:00	(25–7, 25–16, 25–16)			Referees: Jorge Erazo (COL)

August 16, 2005; 17:00	Colombia	1–3	Venezuela	Referees: Ariel Fernández
August 16, 2005; 17:00	(25–22, 18–25, 27–29, 15–25)			Referees: Ariel Fernández

=== Finals ===
==== Bronze-medal match ====
August 17, 2005; 16:00	Colombia	3–0	Ecuador	Referees: Ariel Fernández
August 17, 2005; 16:00	(25–11, 25–15, 25–11)			Referees: Ariel Fernández

==== Gold-medal match ====
August 17, 2005; 19:00	Venezuela	1–3	Peru	Referees: Jorge Erazo (COL)
August 17, 2005; 19:00	(22–25, 23–25, 25–20, 19–25)			Referees: Jorge Erazo (COL)

=== Final standings ===
1. Peru
2. Venezuela
3. Colombia
4. Ecuador

2005 Bolivarian Games winners

Peru
