= 2006 FIVB Women's Volleyball World Championship qualification (CAVB) =

The CAVB qualification for the 2006 FIVB Women's Volleyball World Championship saw member nations compete for three places at the finals in Japan.

== Draw ==
13 CAVB national teams entered qualification. The teams were distributed according to their position in the FIVB Senior Women's Rankings as of 15 January 2004 using the serpentine system for their distribution. (Rankings shown in brackets)

First round

Pool A	Pool B	Pool C
Egypt (18); Nigeria (38); Botswana (—); South Africa (—)	Kenya (23); Algeria (33); DR Congo (56); Congo (—); Eritrea (—)	Cameroon (26); Tunisia (30); Mauritius (66); Uganda (—)

== First round ==
=== Pool A ===
- Venue: Abdullah Al-Faisal Hall, Cairo, Egypt
- Dates: March 17–19, 2005
- All times are Eastern European Time (UTC+02:00)

Pos	Team	Pld	W	L	Pts	SW	SL	SR	SPW	SPL	SPR
1	Egypt	3	3	0	6	9	0	MAX	225	93	2.419
2	Nigeria	3	2	1	5	6	4	1.500	215	211	1.019
3	South Africa	3	1	2	4	4	6	0.667	199	213	0.934
4	Botswana	3	0	3	3	0	9	0.000	103	225	0.458

Date	Time		Score		Set 1	Set 2	Set 3	Set 4	Set 5	Total	Report
17 Mar	16:00	South Africa	1–3	Nigeria	25–21	23–25	19–25	24–26		91–97	Report
17 Mar	19:00	Egypt	3–0	Botswana	25–2	25–10	25–5			75–17	Report
18 Mar	16:00	Botswana	0–3	Nigeria	13–25	10–25	22–25			45–75	Report
18 Mar	18:00	Egypt	3–0	South Africa	25–12	25–12	25–9			75–33	Report
19 Mar	16:00	South Africa	3–0	Botswana	25–15	25–19	25–7			75–41	Report
19 Mar	18:00	Nigeria	0–3	Egypt	15–25	14–25	14–25			43–75	Report

=== Pool B ===
- Venue: Kasarani Hall, Nairobi, Kenya
- Dates: July 20–24, 2005
- All times are East Africa Time (UTC+03:00)

Pos	Team	Pld	W	L	Pts	SW	SL	SR	SPW	SPL	SPR
1	Kenya	4	4	0	8	12	2	6.000	340	198	1.717
2	Algeria	4	3	1	7	11	3	3.667	335	221	1.516
3	Congo	4	2	2	6	6	7	0.857	240	270	0.889
4	DR Congo	4	1	3	5	4	9	0.444	239	292	0.818
5	Eritrea	4	0	4	4	0	12	0.000	127	300	0.423

Date	Time		Score		Set 1	Set 2	Set 3	Set 4	Set 5	Total	Report
20 Jul	16:00	Kenya	3–0	DR Congo	25–13	25–10	25–11			75–34	Report
20 Jul	20:00	Algeria	3–0	Congo	25–8	25–15	25–15			75–38	Report
21 Jul	14:00	Congo	0–3	Kenya	7–25	4–25	18–25			29–75	Report
21 Jul	16:00	Eritrea	0–3	Algeria	13–25	7–25	8–25			28–75	Report
22 Jul	14:00	Congo	3–0	Eritrea	25–7	25–16	25–7			75–30	Report
22 Jul	16:00	Algeria	3–0	DR Congo	25–14	25–13	25–13			75–40	Report
23 Jul	14:00	Congo	3–1	DR Congo	25–18	25–22	21–25	27–25		98–90	Report
23 Jul	16:00	Eritrea	0–3	Kenya	4–25	11–25	10–25			25–75	Report
24 Jul	14:00	DR Congo	3–0	Eritrea	25–14	25–11	25–19			75–44	Report
24 Jul	16:00	Algeria	2–3	Kenya	26–24	26–28	25–23	21–25	12–15	110–115	Report

=== Pool C ===
- Venue: Gymnase Pandit-Sahadeo, Vacoas-Phoenix, Mauritius
- Dates: April 22–24, 2005
- All times are Mauritius Time (UTC+04:00)

Pos	Team	Pld	W	L	Pts	SW	SL	SR	SPW	SPL	SPR
1	Cameroon	3	3	0	6	9	1	9.000	249	183	1.361
2	Tunisia	3	2	1	5	7	3	2.333	229	199	1.151
3	Mauritius	3	1	2	4	3	6	0.500	179	207	0.865
4	Uganda	3	0	3	3	0	9	0.000	157	225	0.698

Date	Time		Score		Set 1	Set 2	Set 3	Set 4	Set 5	Total	Report
22 Apr	16:00	Uganda	0–3	Tunisia	14–25	13–25	20–25			47–75	Report
22 Apr	19:30	Cameroon	3–0	Mauritius	25–19	25–15	25–17			75–51	Report
23 Apr	15:00	Uganda	0–3	Cameroon	21–25	18–25	14–25			53–75	Report
23 Apr	19:30	Mauritius	0–3	Tunisia	17–25	13–25	23–25			53–75	Report
24 Apr	14:30	Uganda	0–3	Mauritius	22–25	14–25	21–25			57–75	Report
24 Apr	18:30	Tunisia	1–3	Cameroon	13–25	26–24	21–25	19–25		79–99	Report
