= 2006 FIVB Women's Volleyball World Championship qualification (NORCECA) =

The NORCECA qualification for the 2006 FIVB Women's Volleyball World Championship saw member nations compete for six places at the finals in Japan.

== Draw ==
19 NORCECA national teams entered qualification. The teams were distributed according to their position in the FIVB Senior Women's Rankings as of 15 January 2004 using the serpentine system for their distribution. (Rankings shown in brackets) Teams ranked 1–6 did not compete in the first round, and automatically qualified for the second round.

First round

Pool A (CAZOVA)	Pool B (ECVA)	Pool C (AFECAVOL)
Jamaica (47); Netherlands Antilles (58); Cayman Islands (—); British Virgin Islands (—)	Barbados (39); Anguilla (—); Dominica (—); Saint Kitts and Nevis (—)	Guatemala (—); Honduras (—); Nicaragua (—); Panama (—); Mexico (35)

Second round

Pool D	Pool E
United States (2); Puerto Rico (17); Canada (21); 1st Pool C 1st Pool B	Cuba (6); Dominican Republic (14); Costa Rica (30); 2nd Pool C 1st Pool A

== First round ==
=== Pool A ===
- Venue: National Arena, Kingston, Jamaica
- Dates: April 15–17, 2005
- All times are Eastern Standard Time (UTC−05:00)

Pos	Team	Pld	W	L	Pts	SW	SL	SR	SPW	SPL	SPR
1	Jamaica	3	3	0	6	9	0	MAX	225	138	1.630
2	Netherlands Antilles	3	2	1	5	6	3	2.000	198	157	1.261
3	British Virgin Islands	3	1	2	4	3	7	0.429	194	230	0.843
4	Cayman Islands	3	0	3	3	1	9	0.111	157	249	0.631

Date	Time		Score		Set 1	Set 2	Set 3	Set 4	Set 5	Total	Report
15 Apr	19:00	British Virgin Islands	0–3	Netherlands Antilles	20–25	11–25	14–25			45–75	Report
15 Apr	21:00	Cayman Islands	0–3	Jamaica	14–25	15–25	11–25			40–75	Report
16 Apr	18:00	Cayman Islands	0–3	Netherlands Antilles	11–25	13–25	13–25			37–75	Report
16 Apr	20:00	British Virgin Islands	0–3	Jamaica	20–25	19–25	11–25			50–75	Report
17 Apr	18:00	Cayman Islands	1–3	British Virgin Islands	15–25	18–25	26–24	19–25		78–99	Report
17 Apr	20:00	Netherlands Antilles	0–3	Jamaica	19–25	18–25	11–25			48–75	Report

=== Pool B ===
- Venue: Garfield Sobers Gymnasium, Bridgetown, Barbados
- Dates: June 17–19, 2005
- All times are Atlantic Standard Time (UTC−04:00)

Pos	Team	Pld	W	L	Pts	SW	SL	SR	SPW	SPL	SPR
1	Barbados	3	3	0	6	9	0	MAX	226	143	1.580
2	Dominica	3	2	1	5	6	6	1.000	251	251	1.000
3	Saint Kitts and Nevis	3	1	2	4	5	6	0.833	219	238	0.920
4	Anguilla	3	0	3	3	1	9	0.111	186	250	0.744

Date	Time		Score		Set 1	Set 2	Set 3	Set 4	Set 5	Total	Report
17 Jun	16:00	Dominica	3–2	Saint Kitts and Nevis	21–25	25–22	18–25	25–17	15–12	104–101	Report
17 Jun	20:00	Anguilla	0–3	Barbados	24–26	15–25	13–25			52–76	Report
18 Jun	14:00	Anguilla	0–3	Saint Kitts and Nevis	21–25	25–27	13–25			59–77	Report
18 Jun	18:00	Barbados	3–0	Dominica	25–18	25–16	25–16			75–50	Report
19 Jun	14:00	Anguilla	1–3	Dominica	25–22	13–25	17–25	20–25		75–97	Report
19 Jun	18:00	Barbados	3–0	Saint Kitts and Nevis	25–13	25–7	25–21			75–41	Report

=== Pool C ===
- Venue: Domo Polideportivo de la CDAG, Guatemala City, Guatemala
- Dates: May 11–15, 2005
- All times are Central Standard Time (UTC−06:00)

Pos	Team	Pld	W	L	Pts	SW	SL	SR	SPW	SPL	SPR
1	Mexico	4	4	0	8	12	1	12.000	325	187	1.738
2	Guatemala	4	3	1	7	10	5	2.000	316	279	1.133
3	Nicaragua	4	2	2	6	8	6	1.333	299	267	1.120
4	Honduras	4	1	3	5	3	10	0.300	230	312	0.737
5	Panama	4	0	4	4	1	12	0.083	197	322	0.612

Date	Time		Score		Set 1	Set 2	Set 3	Set 4	Set 5	Total	Report
11 May	18:30	Nicaragua	0–3	Mexico	19–25	10–25	21–25			50–75	Report
11 May	20:30	Honduras	0–3	Guatemala	18–25	9–25	18–25			45–75	Report
12 May	18:00	Panama	1–3	Honduras	20–25	25–22	21–25	21–25		87–97	Report
12 May	20:00	Nicaragua	2–3	Guatemala	20–25	25–9	16–25	25–22	13–15	99–96	Report
13 May	18:00	Panama	0–3	Nicaragua	18–25	14–25	14–25			46–75	Report
13 May	20:00	Mexico	3–1	Guatemala	25–27	25–14	25–13	25–16		100–70	Report
14 May	16:00	Mexico	3–0	Panama	25–10	25–9	25–10			75–29	Report
14 May	18:00	Honduras	0–3	Nicaragua	13–25	17–25	20–25			50–75	Report
15 May	16:00	Mexico	3–0	Honduras	25–15	25–11	25–12			75–38	Report
15 May	18:00	Panama	0–3	Guatemala	8–25	8–25	19–25			35–75	Report

== Second round ==
=== Pool D ===
- Venue: Coliseo Héctor Solá Bezares, Caguas, Puerto Rico
- Dates: August 13–19, 2005
- All times are Atlantic Standard Time (UTC−04:00)

==== Preliminary round ====
Pos	Team	Pld	W	L	Pts	SW	SL	SR	SPW	SPL	SPR
1	United States	4	4	0	8	12	1	12.000	323	220	1.468
2	Puerto Rico	4	3	1	7	10	6	1.667	342	311	1.100
3	Canada	4	2	2	6	8	7	1.143	334	289	1.156
4	Mexico	4	1	3	5	5	9	0.556	279	317	0.880
5	Barbados	4	0	4	4	0	12	0.000	159	300	0.530

Date	Time		Score		Set 1	Set 2	Set 3	Set 4	Set 5	Total	Report
13 Aug	17:00	Canada	3–1	Mexico	25–20	25–18	22–25	25–23		97–86	Report
13 Aug	20:00	Puerto Rico	3–0	Barbados	25–14	25–16	25–20			75–50	Report
14 Aug	16:00	United States	3–0	Barbados	25–10	25–11	25–14			75–35	Report
14 Aug	18:00	Puerto Rico	3–1	Mexico	20–25	25–17	25–15	25–15		95–72	Report
15 Aug	18:00	Mexico	0–3	United States	15–25	16–25	15–25			46–75	Report
15 Aug	20:00	Puerto Rico	3–2	Canada	25–21	13–25	17–25	25–14	16–14	96–99	Report
16 Aug	18:00	Mexico	3–0	Barbados	25–21	25–12	25–17			75–50	Report
16 Aug	20:00	United States	3–0	Canada	25–22	25–18	25–23			75–63	Report
17 Aug	18:00	Canada	3–0	Barbados	25–14	25–11	25–7			75–32	Report
17 Aug	20:00	Puerto Rico	1–3	United States	14–25	25–23	17–25	20–25		76–98	Report

==== Final round ====
===== Semifinals =====
Date	Time		Score		Set 1	Set 2	Set 3	Set 4	Set 5	Total	Report
18 Aug	18:00	United States	3–0	Mexico	25–12	25–7	25–19			75–38	Report
18 Aug	20:00	Puerto Rico	3–0	Canada	26–24	25–19	25–22			76–65	Report

===== 3rd place =====
Date	Time		Score		Set 1	Set 2	Set 3	Set 4	Set 5	Total	Report
19 Aug	18:00	Canada	0–3	Mexico	21–25	15–25	21–25			57–75	Report

===== Final =====
Date	Time		Score		Set 1	Set 2	Set 3	Set 4	Set 5	Total	Report
19 Aug	20:00	Puerto Rico	0–3	United States	16–25	13–25	18–25			47–75	Report

==== Final standing ====
Rank	Team
1	United States
2	Puerto Rico
3	Mexico
4	Canada
5	Barbados

=== Pool E ===
- Venue: Gran Arena del Cibao, Santiago de los Caballeros, Dominican Republic
- Dates: August 24–28, 2005
- All times are Atlantic Standard Time (UTC−04:00)

Pos	Team	Pld	W	L	Pts	SW	SL	SR	SPW	SPL	SPR
1	Cuba	4	4	0	8	12	0	MAX	304	173	1.757
2	Dominican Republic	4	3	1	7	9	3	3.000	289	197	1.467
3	Costa Rica	4	2	2	6	6	6	1.000	241	261	0.923
4	Guatemala	4	1	3	5	3	10	0.300	220	293	0.751
5	Jamaica	4	0	4	4	1	12	0.083	193	323	0.598

Date	Time		Score		Set 1	Set 2	Set 3	Set 4	Set 5	Total	Report
24 Aug	17:15	Guatemala	3–1	Jamaica	25–16	21–25	25–20	25–7		96–68	Report
24 Aug	20:45	Dominican Republic	3–0	Costa Rica	25–14	25–16	25–20			75–50	Report
25 Aug	17:00	Cuba	3–0	Jamaica	25–10	25–11	25–14			75–35	Report
25 Aug	19:00	Dominican Republic	3–0	Guatemala	25–10	25–12	25–11			75–33	Report
26 Aug	17:00	Cuba	3–0	Costa Rica	25–7	25–12	25–20			75–39	Report
26 Aug	19:00	Dominican Republic	3–0	Jamaica	25–10	25–10	25–15			75–35	Report
27 Aug	17:00	Jamaica	0–3	Costa Rica	17–25	13–25	25–27			55–77	Report
27 Aug	19:00	Cuba	3–0	Guatemala	25–12	25–11	25–12			75–35	Report
28 Aug	17:00	Guatemala	0–3	Costa Rica	22–25	15–25	19–25			56–75	Report
28 Aug	19:00	Dominican Republic	0–3	Cuba	27–29	19–25	18–25			64–79	Report
