= Scotland women's national volleyball team =

Women's national volleyball team representing Scotland

Scotland
- Association: Scottish Volleyball Association
- Confederation: CEV
- FIVB ranking: 48 ▼12 (29 June 2025)

Uniforms
Home	Away

The Scotland women's national volleyball team represents Scotland in international women's volleyball competitions and friendly matches. The team is managed by the Scotland Volleyball Association (SVA), which is a part of the Federation of International Volleyball (FIVB) and the European Volleyball Confederation (CEV). The Scotland team also follows the Small Countries Association (SCA). The Scotland team has never played in major international tournaments such as the FIVB World Championship or the CEV European Championship, but often competes in the qualifiers for these tournaments. It participates in regional competitions for small countries, such as the Small Countries Division Championship and the Games of the Small States of Europe.

== Team history ==
The Scottish Volleyball Association was founded in 1968 by the withdrawal of Scottish volleyball organizations from the jurisdiction of English Volleyball Association and joined the FIVB two years later. The Scottish women's volleyball team did not enter the official international competitions until 2004, when the team took part in the European Small Nations Championships for the first time. After confidently passing the qualifications, the Scottish won only one match out of four and took the final 4th place. Afterwards, the Scottish national team regularly participated in such competitions, but only in 2013 they manage to be among the medalists for the first time, winning the bronze medal. Two years later, they again won a medal in this competition but this time it was silver, losing only to the national team of Cyprus. In 2022, the Scottish team won the Small Nations Championship for the first time. Apart from the European Small Nations Championships, the Scottish team took part in the qualifiers for the FIVB World Championships three times, but each time they were eliminated from the competition at the first group stage.
