= British Volleyball Federation =

Governing body of volleyball in the UK

- Abbreviation: BVF
- Formation: 1955
- Type: National sports governing body
- Legal status: Private company limited by guarantee without share capital (06651480)
- Purpose: To lobby for funding from the UK’s key government agencies to help athletes compete in elite competitions
- Region served: UK
- Members: British volleyball players
- President: Richard Callicott MBE
- Main organ: British Volleyball Board (President - Richard Callicott)
- Affiliations: Fédération Internationale de Volleyball, Confédération Européenne de Volleyball, British Olympic Association, Scottish Volleyball Association, Northern Ireland Volleyball Association, Volleyball England, Volleyball Wales
- Website: British Volleyball
- Formerly called: Amateur Volleyball Association of Great Britain and Northern Ireland

The British Volleyball Federation (BVF) is the national sports governing for volleyball participation in the UK. It is a Home Nations federation of Volleyball England, Volleyball Wales, Scottish Volleyball and Northern Ireland Volleyball. It lobbies the UK government for funding to help elite volleyball athletes compete internationally.

== History ==
=== Formation ===
The BVF was formed as the Amateur Volleyball Association of Great Britain and Northern Ireland in 1955. It was revived in 1980 as the British Volleyball Federation, and registered as a company on 21 July 2008.

It ran annual competitions between teams from the Home Nations from 1985-1991. In 1990 it appointed a full-time coach. In late 1992, it developed the idea of opening a national training centre for team volleyball at Sheffield. It would be the first team sport in Britain to have such a centre.

=== Olympic Representation ===
The BVF planned for Britain to send a Great Britain volleyball team to the Olympics in 1992, but this never occurred. Home Nations teams continued to represent Britain in other international competitions. British volleyball was not funded well in the 1990s. For the 1996 Olympics, beach volleyball pair Audrey Cooper (aged 31) and Amanda Glover (aged 25) qualified after practising on Bournemouth beach, and this was the first time that Britain had ever qualified for any volleyball discipline in the Olympics. After qualifying, in March 1996, they trained in Amsterdam because Britain had no permanent beach volleyball courts.

The London 2012 Olympic Games and Paralympics set goals for GBR representation in Indoor Volleyball, Beach Volleyball and Sitting Volleyball. An intense programme of 5 years with UK Sport funding brought GBR teams to the point of qualification as hosts. UKSport reduced funding to BVF and de-funded the Women's Indoor and Men's Beach programmes. Notwithstanding this, all 6 disciplines played on and met the credibility threshold set by the British Olympic Association (NOC). They took the courts in August 2012 at Earls Court, Horseguards Parade and the ExCel Centre.

The British Volleyball Federation continues to lead and focus on elite representation for the UK in all six volleyball team disciplines in the Olympic and Paralympic movement. In common with many other GBR Olympic sports the funding from the current government sports agency ukSport has been minimal for preparations to achieve qualification for the Rio Games of 2016. Notwithstanding this, BVF continues to press forward with the support of the World and European authorities (FIVB and CEV).

=== Beach Volleyball Olympic Legacy ===
Prior to the London 2012 Olympics, funding for beach courts in Britain was difficult because the BVF was funded by the Sports Council, and could not therefore apply for National Lottery grants. Since that time, the number of Beach Volleyball Clubs and Courts has greatly increased, and competitions such as the UK Beach Tour help to develop UK athletes. Beach Volleyball made its Youth Commonwealth Games debut in the Bahamas in 2017, followed by the Commonwealth Games in the Gold Coast in 2018, with representation from Home Nations teams, It will also be part of the official programme for the Birmingham 2022 Commonwealth Games.

== Headquarters ==
The BVF was headquartered at the English Institute of Sport – Sheffield in the runup to the 2012 London Games and was sponsored by Vertex. Training for both men's and women's teams took place at Sheffield and Beach Pairs abroad. Since the 2012 Games, BVF has downsized and its administration is supported at Loughborough by the Volleyball England staff.

== Function ==
The BVF disciplines include:

- Indoor volleyball
- Beach volleyball
- Sitting volleyball (Paralympics)
- Snow Volleyball
