= Scottish Volleyball =

National governing body for volleyball in Scotland

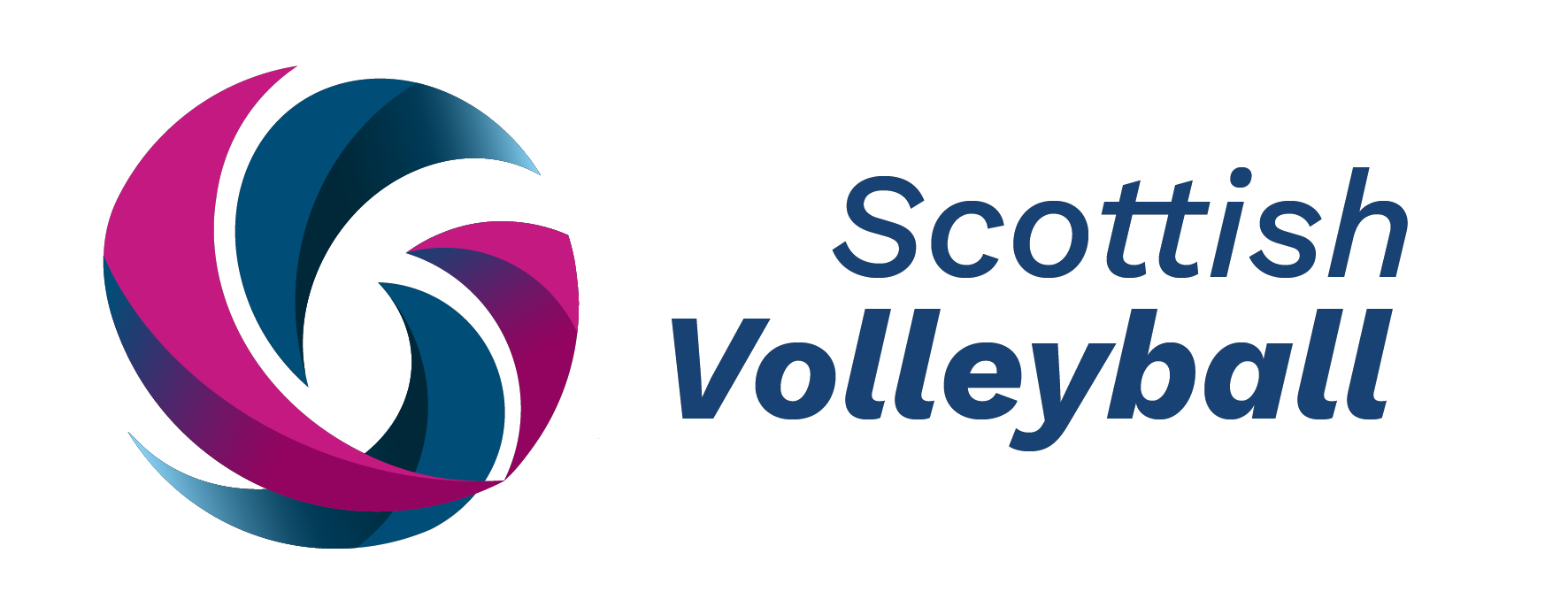
- Sport: Volleyball
- Other sports: Beach volleyball
- Official website: www.scottishvolleyball.org

Affiliations
- International federation: Fédération Internationale de Volleyball (FIVB)
- FIVB members page: www.fivb.org/EN/FIVB/Confederation_CEV.asp
- FIVB member since: 1970
- Continental association: Confédération Européenne de Volleyball (CEV)

Elected
- President: Andrew Fleming
- Board: Ian Girot (Finance); Jean Bruce (HR); Keith Macleod (Marketing and Sponsorship); Bill Stobie (Technical); Scott Borthwick (Legal)

Staff
- Address: 48 The Pleasance; Edinburgh; EH8 9TJ
- Chief Executive: Margaret Ann Fleming
- High Performance Indoor Programme and Coaching Manager: Ally Jack
- High Performance Beach Programme Manager and Head Coach: Sarah Jankowitz
- Competition and Events Officer: Rowan Johnston
- Community Development Officer: Adam Paton
- Foundation Development Officer: Maddy Weber
- Head of Development: Blair Pettigrew
- Number of staff: 12

Finance
- Company status: Private Limited by Guarantee

Scottish Volleyball is the national governing body for volleyball, beach volleyball and sitting volleyball in Scotland. It is responsible for the development, promotion and delivery of district, national and international volleyball in Scotland. Legally, it is a private company limited by guarantee, with its members acting as its guarantors.

== Affiliations ==
Scottish Volleyball is affiliated with the following organisations:

- British Olympic Association (BOA)
- British Volleyball Federation (BVF)
- Commonwealth Games Scotland (CGS)
- Confédération Européenne de Volleyball (CEV)
- CEV Small Countries Association (SCA)
- Fédération Internationale de Volleyball (FIVB)

== Membership ==
In order to participate as a player, coach or official in a Scottish Volleyball approved competition, to hold an elected office within a member club or to play in a representative national team of Scottish Volleyball, it is necessary to become a member of the Association.

There are several categories of membership:

- Tier 1 - players, coaches or officials involved in National Competitions
- Tier 2 - players, coaches or officials involved in Local or District Competitions
- Tier 3 - players, coaches or officials involved in School Competitions
- Associate - a person who is not also a registered player, coach or official.
- Club - volleyball clubs based in Scotland
- Group - Schools or other organisations in Scotland who play volleyball but are not primarily volleyball clubs
- Honorary - awarded to individual members at the discretion of the Board of Directors

== Commissions ==
To assist with the running of the association, the SVA and its board of directors, establish various commissions, typically staffed by volunteer members, each with specific areas of responsibility. These include:

- Beach Commission
- Coaches Commission
- Competitions Advisory Group
- Referees Commission
- Student Commission
- Youth and Schools Commission
- Special Events Commission

== National competitions ==
Each season, Scottish Volleyball organises various senior and junior league and cup competitions. These competitions are governed by the FIVB's Official Volleyball Rules, the FIVB's Official Beach Volleyball Rules and the SVA's Rules of Scottish Volleyball Competitions.

=== Senior competitions ===
==== Scottish Volleyball League (SVL) ====
Organised volleyball leagues began in Scotland in the 1960s and were known as the National League. The number of divisions and number of teams in each division varied over the years, with the lower divisions sometimes split into East and West.

In season 2015–16, the National League was renamed the Scottish Volleyball League (SVL), the top division renamed from Division 1 to SVL Premier and the second and third divisions renamed League One and Two.

As of season 2023–24, there are three divisions in the senior men's and two in the senior women's SVL. The teams winning the SVL Premier division gain the title of Scottish Champions and are entitled to enter the CEV Cup the following season.

As of the 2022-23 season, SVL Premier has had a series of post-season playoffs to determine the Scottish Champion. Currently, the top four teams in SVL Premier go into a series of semi-finals and finals, each played over two legs.

The divisions are:

- Men's SVL Premier
- Women's SVL Premier
- Men's League One
- Women's League One

===== List of Scottish Champions =====
The table below lists all Scottish Champions from season 1968–69 to 2021–22:

| Season | Men | Women |
|---|---|---|
| 1968–69 | Dalziel | |
| 1969–70 | Edinburgh University | |
| 1970–71 | Edinburgh University | |
| 1971–72 | Coatbridge YMCA | |
| 1972–73 | Dalziel | |
| 1973–74 | Telford | |
| 1974–75 | Kirkton (Dundee) | |
| 1975–76 | Telford | |
| 1976–77 | Telford | Coatbridge YMCA |
| 1977–78 | Kirkton (Dundee) | Prestwick |
| 1978–79 | Telford | Dodds Troon |
| 1979–80 | MIM (Telford) | Dodds Troon |
| 1980–81 | MIM (Telford) | Telford |
| 1981–82 | MIM (Telford) | Telford |
| 1982–83 | MIM (Telford) | Telford |
| 1983–84 | MIM (Telford) | Telford |
| 1984–85 | MIM (Telford) | Team Scottish Farm |
| 1985–86 | Krystal Klear (Kilmarnock) | Team Scottish Farm |
| 1986–87 | MIM (Telford) | Provincial Insurance |
| 1987–88 | Krystal Klear (Kilmarnock) | Kyle |
| 1988–89 | Kinleith Plant (Telford) | Adscreen Kyle |
| 1989–90 | Krystal Klear (Kilmarnock) | Adscreen Kyle |
| 1990–91 | Team Novasport DV | Adscreen Kyle |
| 1991–92 | West Coast (Kilmarnock) | Glasgow Powerhouse |
| 1992–93 | City of Glasgow Ragazzi | Team Components Bureau |
| 1993–94 | City of Glasgow Ragazzi | MCA Powerhouse Cardinals |
| 1994–95 | City of Glasgow Ragazzi | MCA Powerhouse Cardinals |
| 1995–96 | City of Glasgow Ragazzi | MCA Cardinals |
| 1996–97 | City of Glasgow Ragazzi | Su Ragazzi |
| 1997–98 | City of Glasgow Ragazzi | Rucanor Jets |
| 1998–99 | Kilmarnock | Rucanor Jets |
| 1999–00 | Kilmarnock | Troon |
| 2000–01 | Kilmarnock | Su Ragazzi |
| 2001–02 | Kilmarnock | Troon |
| 2002–03 | Kilmarnock | Troon |
| 2003–04 | City of Glasgow Ragazzi | Troon |
| 2004–05 | City of Glasgow Ragazzi | City of Edinburgh |
| 2005–06 | Kilmarnock | City of Edinburgh |
| 2006–07 | Kilmarnock | City of Edinburgh |
| 2007–08 | Kilmarnock | Su Ragazzi |
| 2008–09 | Glasgow Mets | Troon |
| 2009–10 | City of Edinburgh | City of Edinburgh |
| 2010–11 | Glasgow Mets | City of Edinburgh |
| 2011–12 | Kilmarnock | City of Edinburgh |
| 2012–13 | City of Edinburgh | City of Edinburgh |
| 2013–14 | Edinburgh Jets | City of Edinburgh |
| 2014–15 | South Ayrshire | City of Edinburgh |
| 2015–16 | City of Glasgow Ragazzi | Su Ragazzi |
| 2016–17 | City of Glasgow Ragazzi | Su Ragazzi |
| 2017–18 | City of Glasgow Ragazzi | Su Ragazzi |
| 2018–19 | City of Glasgow Ragazzi | City of Edinburgh |
| 2019-20 | City of Edinburgh | Su Ragazzi |
| 2020-21 | No competition due to COVID-19 pandemic | |
| 2021-22 | City of Edinburgh | City of Edinburgh |
| 2022-23 | | |
| 2023-24 | City of Glasgow Ragazzi | Su Ragazzi |

===== SVL clubs =====
As of season 2021–22, the following clubs have at least one team in the SVL:

- Caledonia West
- City of Edinburgh
- Dundee
- Glasgow International
- Glasgow Mets
- Edinburgh Jets
- Lenzie
- NUVOC
- Shetland
- South Ayrshire
- Su Ragazzi
- University of Edinburgh
- Volleyball Aberdeen

==== John Syer Grand Prix ====
This competition was introduced in season 2006–07 as the Top Teams Cup, as a means of providing the teams in the top divisions with an increased number of competitive matches against each other. In 2009–10, it was renamed the John Syer Trophy in honour of the SVA's first Technical Director. Since 2015–16, it has been known as the John Syer Grand Prix (JSGP). SVL Premier teams competed in this tournament in the early part of the season, usually on the same dates that lower division teams compete in rounds 1–3 of the Scottish Cup. In the season 2021–22, the tournament was not played.

===== List of JSGP winners =====
As of season 2019–20, the winners of this trophy are as listed in the table below:

| Season | Men | Women |
|---|---|---|
| 2006–07 | City of Glasgow Ragazzi | Troon |
| 2007–08 | Glasgow Mets | Su Ragazzi |
| 2008–09 | Glasgow Mets | Troon, Prestwick and Ayr |
| 2009–10 | City of Edinburgh | City of Edinburgh |
| 2010–11 | City of Edinburgh | Troon, Prestwick and Ayr |
| 2011–12 | City of Edinburgh | Edinburgh Jets |
| 2012–13 | Kilmarnock | City of Edinburgh |
| 2013–14 | City of Edinburgh | City of Edinburgh |
| 2014–15 | Glasgow Mets | Su Ragazzi |
| 2015–16 | City of Edinburgh | Su Ragazzi |
| 2016–17 | City of Edinburgh | Su Ragazzi |
| 2017–18 | City of Glasgow Ragazzi | Su Ragazzi |
| 2018–19 | City of Glasgow Ragazzi | Su Ragazzi |
| 2019–20 | City of Edinburgh | City of Edinburgh |

==== Scottish Plate ====
The Scottish Plate is contested by teams eliminated from the Scottish Cup in rounds 1–3.

===== List of Scottish Plate winners =====
Table showing Scottish Plate winners from season 1984–85 to 2018–19:

| Season | Men | Women |
|---|---|---|
| 1984–85 | East Kilbride | |
| 1985–86 | Kinleith Plant (Telford) | Trinity |
| 1986–87 | Team Fife | Hazlehead |
| 1987–88 | ? | Whitburn |
| 1988–89 | Elliot Sports Jets | Airdrie |
| 1989–90 | Glasgow | Whitburn |
| 1990–91 | Bon Accord | Pentland NUVOC |
| 1991–92 | Jacobite Jets | Edinburgh University |
| 1992–93 | Pentland NUVOC | M8 Magazine West Coast |
| 1993–94 | Su Ragazzi II | Paisley |
| 1994–95 | Falkirk | Su Ragazzi |
| 1995–96 | DV Phoenix | MCT Brannock |
| 1996–97 | Bellshill Cardinals | Team Stirling |
| 1997–98 | Dundee | Kyle |
| 1998–99 | Su Ragazzi II | Su Ragazzi |
| 1999–00 | Bon Accord | NUVOC |
| 2000–01 | Stirling Grange | NUVOC |
| 2001–02 | Beacon | Queensferry (City of Edinburgh) |
| 2002–03 | Paisley Trailblazers | NUVOC |
| 2003–04 | Glasgow Mets | Kyle |
| 2004–05 | City of Edinburgh II | Pilton |
| 2005–06 | Bellshill Cardinals | Orkney |
| 2006–07 | Dundee II | Dundee University |
| 2007–08 | Bellshill Cardinals | South Ayrshire |
| 2008–09 | Dundee II | North Grampian |
| 2009–10 | Su Ragazzi II | Troon II |
| 2010–11 | Glasgow Mets II | Troon II |
| 2011–12 | Bellshill Cardinals | North Grampian |
| 2012–13 | Su Ragazzi II | Troon II |
| 2013–14 | City of Edinburgh II | North Grampian |
| 2014–15 | Su Ragazzi II | Su Ragazzi II |
| 2015–16 | Su Ragazzi II | Caledonia West |
| 2016–17 | Su Ragazzi II | Troon Vets |
| 2017–18 | Glasgow Mets Vets | Troon Vets |
| 2018–19 | Glasgow Mets Vets | Troon Caledonia West Vets |
| 2019-20 | Competition cancelled due to COVID-19 pandemic | |
| 2020-21 | No competition due to COVID-19 pandemic | |
| 2021-22 | Forza Ragazzi | Glasgow International |
| 2022-23 | | |
| 2023-24 | Forza Ragazzi | NUVOC |

==== Scottish Cup ====
The Scottish Cup is the highest level knockout competition in Scottish volleyball. The first three rounds are organised in small pools. The eight best teams from the pool stages are joined in round 4 by the eight SVL Premier teams. Rounds 4 through to the final are single-leg, knockout rounds. There is an unseeded draw for round 4 which sets the path to the finals. Teams winning the Scottish Cup Final are entitled to enter the CEV Challenge Cup the following season.

===== List of Scottish Cup winners =====
Table showing Scottish Cup winners from season 1963–64:

| Season | Men | Women |
|---|---|---|
| 1963–64 | St Andrews University | |
| 1964–65 | St Andrews University | |
| 1965–66 | Dundee University | |
| 1966–67 | Edinburgh University | |
| 1967–68 | Edinburgh University | |
| 1968–69 | Edinburgh University | |
| 1969–70 | Strathclyde University | |
| 1970–71 | Dalziel | |
| 1971–72 | Dalziel | |
| 1972–73 | Coatbridge YMCA | Dalziel |
| 1973–74 | Telford | Coatbridge YMCA |
| 1974–75 | Coatbridge YMCA | Coatbridge YMCA |
| 1975–76 | Telford | Coatbridge YMCA |
| 1976–77 | Telford | Coatbridge YMCA |
| 1977–78 | Telford | Telford |
| 1978–79 | Telford | Dodds Troon |
| 1979–80 | MIM (Telford) | Dodds Troon |
| 1980–81 | MIM (Telford) | Whitburn |
| 1981–82 | MIM (Telford) | Telford |
| 1982–83 | MIM (Telford) | Telford |
| 1983–84 | Volvo Trucks | Telford |
| 1984–85 | Bellshill Cardinals | Telford |
| 1985–86 | Krystal Klear (Kilmarnock) | Provincial Insurance |
| 1986–87 | MIM (Telford) | Provincial Insurance |
| 1987–88 | Krystal Klear (Kilmarnock) | Provincial Insurance |
| 1988–89 | Krystal Klear (Kilmarnock) | Adscreen Kyle |
| 1989–90 | Krystal Klear (Kilmarnock) | Adscreen Kyle |
| 1990–91 | Kinleith Plant (Telford) | Elliot Sports Jets |
| 1991–92 | Telford | Glasgow Powerhouse |
| 1992–93 | City of Glasgow Ragazzi | Team Components Bureau |
| 1993–96 | City of Glasgow Ragazzi | MCA Powerhouse Cardinals |
| 1994–95 | City of Glasgow Ragazzi | Rucanor Jets |
| 1995–96 | City of Glasgow Ragazzi | Rucanor Jets |
| 1996–97 | City of Glasgow Ragazzi | Hazlehead |
| 1997–98 | City of Glasgow Ragazzi | Rucanor Jets |
| 1998–99 | Kilmarnock | Hazlehead |
| 1999–00 | Kilmarnock | Hazlehead |
| 2000–01 | Kilmarnock | Troon |
| 2001–02 | Kilmarnock | Troon |
| 2002–03 | Kilmarnock | Falkirk College |
| 2003–04 | Kilmarnock | Troon |
| 2004–05 | Kilmarnock | City of Edinburgh |
| 2005–06 | Glasgow Mets | City of Edinburgh |
| 2006–07 | Kilmarnock | City of Edinburgh |
| 2007–08 | Glasgow Mets | Troon |
| 2008–09 | City of Glasgow Ragazzi | Troon |
| 2009–10 | City of Glasgow Ragazzi | Troon |
| 2010–11 | City of Glasgow Ragazzi | Troon |
| 2011–12 | City of Edinburgh | City of Edinburgh |
| 2012–13 | Kilmarnock | City of Edinburgh |
| 2013–14 | Edinburgh Jets | Edinburgh Jets |
| 2014–15 | Glasgow Mets | City of Edinburgh |
| 2015–16 | City of Edinburgh | City of Edinburgh |
| 2016–17 | City of Glasgow Ragazzi | Su Ragazzi |
| 2017–18 | City of Edinburgh | Su Ragazzi |
| 2018–19 | City of Edinburgh | City of Edinburgh |
| 2019-20 | Competition cancelled due to COVID-19 pandemic | |
| 2020-21 | No competition due to COVID-19 pandemic | |
| 2021-22 | City of Edinburgh | University of Edinburgh |
| 2022-23 | | |
| 2023-24 | City of Edinburgh | City of Edinburgh |

=== Junior competitions ===
==== Junior SVL (U18) ====
The top junior league was introduced in the late 1990s and, over the years, varied between an U18 and U19 competition. Until season 2014–15, it was known as the Junior National League. In season 2015–16, it was renamed the Junior SVL and, since then, has been an U18 competition.

===== List of Junior SVL (U18) winners =====
Table showing Junior SVL (U18) winners from season 1998–99:

| Season | U18 Boys | U18 Girls |
|---|---|---|
| 1998–99 | City of Edinburgh | Marr College |
| 1999–00 | | |
| 2000–01 | | |
| 2001–02 | Glasgow Juniors | East Lothian Falcons |
| 2002–03 | | |
| 2003–04 | City of Edinburgh | Mearns Castle |
| 2004–05 | East Lothian Falcons | Mearns Castle |
| 2005–06 | Mearns Castle | Mearns Castle |
| 2006–07 | Mearns Castle | Marr College |
| 2007–08 | South Ayrshire | South Ayrshire |
| 2008–09 | South Ayrshire | Belmont Academy |
| 2009–10 | City of Edinburgh | South Ayrshire |
| 2010–11 | City of Edinburgh | City of Edinburgh |
| 2011–12 | City of Edinburgh | Futures |
| 2012–13 | South Ayrshire | Marr College |
| 2013–14 | Team Lanarkshire | Marr College |
| 2014–15 | Team Lanarkshire | Lanarkshire Ragazzi |
| 2015–16 | South Ayrshire | Marr College |
| 2016–17 | City of Edinburgh | Marr College |
| 2017–18 | South Ayrshire | Marr College |
| 2018–19 | VA Blaze | City of Edinburgh A |
| 2020-21 | No competition due to COVID-19 pandemic | |
| 2021-22 | NUVOC | Caledonia West |

==== Junior Scottish Cup (U18) ====
The U18 knockout competition was introduced in season 2012–13 as the Junior Super Cup and renamed the Junior Scottish Cup in 2015–16.

===== List of U18 Junior Scottish Cup winners =====
Table showing U18 Junior Scottish Cup winners from season 2012–13 to 2018–19:

| Season | U18 Boys | U18 Girls |
|---|---|---|
| 2012–13 | South Ayrshire | Lanarkshire Ragazzi |
| 2013–14 | City of Edinburgh | Lanarkshire Ragazzi |
| 2014–15 | Team Lanarkshire | Marr College |
| 2015–16 | City of Edinburgh | Marr College |
| 2016–17 | City of Edinburgh | Marr College |
| 2017–18 | City of Edinburgh | Marr College |
| 2018–19 | City of Edinburgh | City of Edinburgh |

==== Junior SVL (U16) ====
The lower junior league was introduced in season 2006–07 and, over the years, varied between U15 and U16. Until season 2014–15 it was known as the Junior National League. In season 2015–16 it was renamed the Junior SVL and, since then, has been an U16 competition.

===== List of Junior SVL (U16) winners =====
Table showing Junior SVL (U16) winners from season 2006–07 to 2018–19:

| Season | U16 Boys | U16 Girls |
|---|---|---|
| 2006–07 | Glasgow Mets | Marr College |
| 2007–08 | Marr College | Glasgow Mets |
| 2008–09 | Marr College | South Ayrshire |
| 2009–10 | Marr College | Marr College |
| 2010–11 | Belmont Troon | Marr College |
| 2011–12 | City of Edinburgh | City of Edinburgh |
| 2012–13 | South Ayrshire | Marr College |
| 2013–14 | City of Edinburgh | Marr College |
| 2014–15 | City of Edinburgh | Marr College |
| 2015–16 | City of Edinburgh | Marr College |
| 2016–17 | City of Edinburgh | City of Edinburgh |
| 2017–18 | VA Blaze | City of Edinburgh |
| 2018–19 | – | City of Edinburgh A |

==== Junior Scottish Cup (U16) ====
The U16 Junior Scottish Cup was introduced in season 2015–16.

===== List of U16 Junior Scottish Cup winners =====
Table showing U16 Junior Scottish Cup winners from season 2015–16 to 2018–19:

| Season | U16 Boys | U16 Girls |
|---|---|---|
| 2015–16 | City of Edinburgh | Marr College |
| 2016–17 | City of Edinburgh | City of Edinburgh |
| 2017–18 | VA Blaze | City of Edinburgh |
| 2018–19 | City of Edinburgh | City of Edinburgh |

=== School competitions ===
- Schools Cup

1968 Coatbridge High School

1996 Stonelaw High School

2016 James Gillespie's High School

=== Beach competitions ===
- Scottish Beach Tour

== Student competitions ==
Scottish Student Volleyball operates within the constitution of the SVA and is administered and supported by Scottish Student Sport (SSS). The Development Co-ordinator for Scottish Student Volleyball is Paul McPate of the University of Dundee's, Institute of Sport and Exercise.

The following student competitions are organised each year:

- Scottish Student Leagues (BUCS Tiers 1A,2A, and 3A for women and men)
- Scottish Student Cup
- Scottish College Finals
- SSS Beach Championship
- International Student Challenge (Scottish Students National Team)

== District competitions ==
- Scottish District Cup

== National team ==
=== Scottish Men's National Team (Indoor) ===
Caps
| # | Surname | Caps |
| 1 | Bendiks, Heinz | 1 |
| 2 | Domaingue, Yvon | 1 |
| 3 | Hamilton, Ronnie | 94 |
| 4 | Howarth, Richard | 24 |
| 5 | Jones, Dallas | 2 |
| 6 | Mackie, Karl | 2 |
| 7 | Mair, Ian | 23 |
| 8 | McPhee, Ian | 2 |
| 9 | Poirson, Jean | 1 |
| 10 | Syer, John | 2 |
| 11 | Tweedale, Alan | 6 |
| 12 | Wilson, Jim | 2 |
| 13 | Lyle, John | 23 |
| 14 | Maxwell, Ian | 6 |
| 15 | Pollock, Jon | 31 |
| 16 | Robertson, Jim | 1 |
| 17 | Anderson, Kenny | 61 |
| 18 | Bradley, Des | 29 |
| 19 | Ferguson, Charlie | 48 |
| 20 | Paton, David | 27 |
| 21 | Todd, Jim | 32 |
| 22 | Hillier, John | 20 |
| 23 | Leighton, Frank | 86 |
| 24 | Docherty, Gerry | 48 |
| 25 | Blevins, Dougie | 7 |
| 26 | Cowper, Jim | 55 |
| 27 | Craig, Raymond | 7 |
| 28 | Moody, Nick | 1 |
| 29 | Leighton, Gus | 33 |
| 30 | Reid, Joe | 22 |
| 31 | Robertson, Barry | 74 |
| 32 | Scrimgeour, John | 73 |
| 33 | Stokes, Bob | 2 |
| 34 | Krawczyk, Vince | 1 |
| 35 | McPherson, Donnie | 52 |
| 36 | Shaw, Gordon | 3 |
| 37 | Black, Steve | 29 |
| 38 | Orr, Brian | 1 |
| 39 | Pirrie, John | 17 |
| 40 | Ravizza, Frannie | 1 |
| 41 | Buchan, Pete | 7 |
| 42 | McDonald, Alastair | 1 |
| 43 | McKenna, Jim | 75 |
| 44 | Brown, Bobby | 1 |
| 45 | Calder, Billy | 11 |
| 46 | Gibson, Alistair | 30 |
| 47 | Barton, Kenny | 54 |
| 48 | Hughes, Mike | 2 |
| 49 | Garrioch, Ian | 4 |
| 50 | Syme, Gordon | 53 |
| 51 | Auld, Robert | 10 |
| 52 | Clemenson, Paul | 1 |
| 53 | Gormley, Alan | 2 |
| 54 | McSloy, Gerry | 9 |
| 55 | Todd, Willie | 2 |
| 56 | Edwards, Jackie | 1 |
| 57 | Stewart, Neil | 31 |
| 58 | Christie, Eric | 10 |
| 59 | Pirrit, Gordon | 12 |
| 60 | Smith, Gordon | 8 |
| 61 | Mitchell, Ian | 6 |
| 62 | Thomas, Alan | 44 |
| 63 | English, Stuart | 4 |
| 64 | Ferguson, Ian | 7 |
| 65 | Green, Brian | 7 |
| 66 | McMillan, Fraser | 6 |
| 67 | Gaughan, John | 7 |
| 68 | Lamont, Gary | 12 |
| 69 | McKenzie, Ian | 21 |
| 70 | Carruthers, Paul | 22 |
| 71 | Donaldson, Ewan | 4 |
| 72 | Harvey, Iain | 18 |
| 73 | Kalugerovich, David | 8 |
| 74 | Banks, Brian | 10 |
| 75 | Morton, Fraser | 19 |
| 76 | Clark, Danny | 8 |
| 77 | Grubb, Iain | 117 |
| 78 | Love, Alistair | 8 |
| 79 | Milne, Kenny | 100 |
| 80 | Mercer, James | 4 |
| 81 | Marshall, Geoff | 73 |
| 82 | Orr, James | 29 |
| 83 | Owens, Michael | 9 |
| 84 | Spratt, Robert | 19 |
| 85 | Cook, Iain | 3 |
| 86 | Elms, Stuart | 6 |
| 87 | Milne, Steven | 38 |
| 88 | Rhodes, Michael | 29 |
| 89 | Vine, Nick | 20 |
| 90 | Gilmour, Paul | 6 |
| 91 | McGregor, Mark | 8 |
| 92 | Gunn, Alex | 3 |
| 93 | Jackson, Steven | 32 |
| 94 | Corbett, Derek | 27 |
| 95 | McGuire, Gary | 79 |
| 96 | Russell, Scott | 11 |
| 97 | McGoughan, Archie | 53 |
| 98 | Mitchell, Gus | 26 |
| 99 | Bowes, Imorfe | 16 |
| 100 | Linton, Stephen | 95 |
| 101 | Nelson, Jamie | 14 |
| 102 | Welsh, Gordon | 91 |
| 103 | Hoyle, David | 4 |
| 104 | Hudson, Mark | 37 |
| 105 | Kerr, Tam | 9 |
| 106 | McCallum, Neil | 14 |
| 107 | Cleland, Iain | 53 |
| 108 | Craig, David | 30 |
| 109 | Gunn, David | 15 |
| 110 | McQueen, Scott | 1 |
| 111 | Loftus, Simon | 69 |
| 112 | Curran, Kevin | 3 |
| 113 | Edgar, Stuart | 111 |
| 114 | McGuigan, Barry | 33 |
| 115 | Jackson, Robert | 17 |
| 116 | McGrenary, Stewart | 69 |
| 117 | Galloway, Alistair | 100 |
| 118 | Fraser, Chris | 28 |
| 119 | Jordan, Gary | 17 |
| 120 | O`Neill, Brian | 73 |
| 121 | Stronach, Andrew | 21 |
| 122 | Herley, Jonathon | 51 |
| 123 | Hughes, Dylan | 23 |
| 124 | Lamont, Christopher | 63 |
| 125 | Lloyd, Chris | 7 |
| 126 | Glissov, Paul | 26 |
| 127 | Lewis, Ben | 4 |
| 128 | McGivern, Mark | 48 |
| 129 | Collin, Niall | 65 |
| 130 | Krawczyk, Alan | 28 |
| 131 | deLattre, Christophe | 4 |
| 132 | Benson, Andrew | 11 |
| 133 | Todd, Stephen | 16 |
| 134 | McKernan, Andrew | 3 |
| 135 | Chisholm, Kevin | 5 |
| 136 | Duncan, Euan | 5 |
| 137 | Green, Calum | 26 |
| 138 | McNab, Colin | 5 |
| 139 | Traylor, Danny | 13 |
| 140 | Giles, Colin | 18 |
| 141 | Hamilton, Colin | 6 |
| 142 | McLeod, Ryan | 13 |
| 143 | King, Alisdair | 6 |
| 144 | Penny, Mike | 31 |
| 145 | Watt, Gavin | 18 |
| 146 | Hammond, Simon | 11 |
| 147 | Isted, Ruari | 21 |
| 148 | Miedzybrodski, Robin | 11 |
| 149 | Caldwell, Stewart | 21 |
| 150 | McGregor, Andrew | 2 |
| 151 | Cook, Seain | 21 |
| 152 | McHardy, Jamie | 16 |
| 153 | Brown, Fraser | 18 |
| 154 | Green, Alistair | 4 |
| 155 | Young, Tom | 4 |
| 156 | Hendry, Sean | 6 |
| 157 | Boyle, Connor | 15 |
| 158 | Mackenzie, Stuart | 18 |
| 159 | McLaughlin, Marc | 11 |
| 160 | Spowart, Graeme | 6 |
| 161 | Wilson, Scott | 6 |
| 162 | Martin, Darren | 14 |
| 163 | Dunlop, Fraser | 5 |
| 164 | McKelvie, Ross | 7 |
| 165 | Walker, Connor | 9 |
| 166 | Gibson, Ewan | 2 |
| 167 | Oldbury, Edward | 12 |
| 168 | Anderson, Jack | 4 |
| 169 | Black, Jonny | 10 |
| 170 | Cathro, Mark | 4 |
| 171 | Darling, Liam | 9 |
| 172 | McKelvey, Jack | 4 |
| 173 | Mexson, David | 4 |
| 174 | Micallef, Robert | 1 |
| 175 | Brown, Mitchell | 5 |
| 176 | Hadden, Clark | 6 |
| 177 | Hook, Cameron | 11 |
| 178 | Hockey, Peter | 5 |
| 179 | Ritchie, Harris | 2 |
| 180 | Lee, Michael | 3 |
| 181 | Fraser, Euan | 3 |

=== Scottish Women's National Team (Indoor) ===
Caps
| # | Surname | Caps |
| 1 | Church, Elizabeth Ann | 2 |
| 2 | Church, Joan | 1 |
| 3 | Crawford, Alison | 25 |
| 4 | Crawford, Ann | 14 |
| 5 | Harley, Kay | 1 |
| 6 | Holcombe, Jess | 25 |
| 7 | Jones, Liz | 6 |
| 8 | Matear, Liz | 7 |
| 9 | Park, Linda | 8 |
| 10 | Rostworowska, Barbara | 3 |
| 11 | Shirley, Sylvia | 1 |
| 12 | Campbell, Yvonne | 1 |
| 13 | Crawford, Marion | 13 |
| 14 | Pae, Kathy | 17 |
| 15 | Swanston, Jean | 13 |
| 16 | Taylor, Linda | 5 |
| 17 | Burns, Valerie | 4 |
| 18 | MacLaren, Vicky | 5 |
| 19 | Wilson, Stee | 7 |
| 20 | Doonan, Frances | 19 |
| 21 | Graham, Elaine | 5 |
| 22 | Harrison, Pamela | 4 |
| 23 | Thow, Morag | 39 |
| 24 | Glenn, Fiona | 16 |
| 25 | Gray, Barbara | 1 |
| 26 | Smith, Jess | 40 |
| 27 | Buchanan, Irene | 1 |
| 28 | Barclay, Eileen | 4 |
| 29 | Gardiner, Janice | 1 |
| 30 | Stewart, Morven | 3 |
| 31 | Glenn, Irene | 3 |
| 32 | Shanks, Janet | 2 |
| 33 | Stevenson, Linda | 19 |
| 34 | Doogan, Geri | 19 |
| 35 | Paterson, Helen | 1 |
| 36 | Smith, Moira | 35 |
| 37 | Wilkinson, Hilary | 1 |
| 38 | Cook, Doreen | 18 |
| 39 | Stevenson, Carol | 18 |
| 40 | Agnew, Annette | 38 |
| 41 | Brown, Morag | 37 |
| 42 | Scott, Morag | 8 |
| 43 | Tennant, Lyn | 43 |
| 44 | Gunson, Jenny | 21 |
| 45 | Martin, Freda | 11 |
| 46 | Rawlings, Susan | 34 |
| 47 | Smith, Rena | 13 |
| 48 | Sutherland, Fiona | 18 |
| 49 | Brown, Pamela | 35 |
| 50 | Hendry, Yvonne | 32 |
| 51 | Brodie, Rona | 37 |
| 52 | Docherty, Lucy | 2 |
| 53 | Cooper, Audrey | 30 |
| 54 | Paterson, Claire | 23 |
| 55 | Mackie, Sandra | 12 |
| 56 | McLeod, Jean | 5 |
| 57 | McKenzie, Kim | 12 |
| 58 | Strain, Yvonne | 18 |
| 59 | Meikle, Morag | 9 |
| 60 | Gorrie, Anne | 1 |
| 61 | McCulloch, Caroline | 10 |
| 62 | Young, Jane | 12 |
| 63 | Reid, Judy | 2 |
| 64 | Hendry, Lyn | 6 |
| 65 | Brown, Eileen | 4 |
| 66 | Fulton, Christine | 2 |
| 67 | Kennedy, Elaine | 2 |
| 68 | McLean, Lynn | 2 |
| 69 | Sparks, Ann | 17 |
| 70 | Walker, Annette | 2 |
| 71 | Fowler, Liz | 10 |
| 72 | Huggan, Judi | 1 |
| 73 | Laird, Gillian | 2 |
| 74 | Fleming, Margaret Ann | 5 |
| 75 | Gribben, Adrienne | 1 |
| 76 | Gilmartin, Claire | 7 |
| 77 | Hughes, Linda | 1 |
| 78 | Mackie, Yvonne | 4 |
| 79 | Banks, Karen | 2 |
| 80 | Cooper, Sandra | 2 |
| 81 | Dunnett, Sheila | 15 |
| 82 | Dodds, Jillian | 2 |
| 83 | McIntyre, Ruth | 2 |
| 84 | Murray, Rowena | 2 |
| 85 | Coutts, Mel | 11 |
| 86 | Hamilton, Fiona | 3 |
| 87 | Main, Allia | 7 |
| 88 | McDonald, Sandra | 18 |
| 89 | Coleman, Alison | 4 |
| 90 | Dignan, Claire | 4 |
| 91 | McLay, Fiona | 4 |
| 92 | Wannan, Gillian | 7 |
| 93 | Walker, Morag | 3 |
| 94 | Bryant, Eleanor | 9 |
| 95 | Cameron, Lisa | 3 |
| 96 | Hughes, Linda | 3 |
| 97 | Jamieson, Gail | 9 |
| 98 | Munro, Pauline | 3 |
| 99 | Ord, Melanie | 3 |
| 100 | Philpot, Lorraine | 3 |
| 101 | Shek, Hilda | 9 |
| 102 | Simpson, Morag | 3 |
| 103 | Will, Morven | 6 |
| 104 | Bell, Pam | 6 |
| 105 | Brammel, Lynne | 6 |
| 106 | Gunn, Trisha | 3 |
| 107 | Pearson, Caroline | 6 |
| 108 | Turnbull, Niki | 6 |
| 109 | Collighan, Gail | 3 |
| 110 | Duffy, Nicola | 3 |
| 111 | James, Nicola | 3 |
| 112 | Cairns, Carrie-Anne | 12 |
| 113 | Craig, Debbie | 13 |
| 114 | Craig, Kay | 12 |
| 115 | Cox, Gillian | 12 |
| 116 | Ellis, Jenny | 19 |
| 117 | Gibson, Sandra | 3 |
| 118 | Lawrie, Fiona | 9 |
| 119 | Lyall, Gillian | 26 |
| 120 | Robb, Lesley | 12 |
| 121 | Scott, Paula | 26 |
| 122 | Sinclair, Gillian | 3 |
| 123 | Beattie, Lynne | 35 |
| 124 | Mitchell, Lynda | 5 |
| 125 | Thom, Jen | 58 |
| 126 | Welsh, Fiona | 13 |
| 127 | Mullin, Shauna | 14 |
| 128 | Eadie, Gillian | 4 |
| 129 | Hastings, Anneka | 16 |
| 130 | Hildebrand, Diane | 5 |
| 131 | Krawczyk, Elaine | 34 |
| 132 | Morgan, Jo | 28 |
| 133 | Morrish, Anne | 13 |
| 134 | Smith, Fiona | 1 |
| 135 | Brackenridge, Susan | 1 |
| 136 | Black, Karen | 11 |
| 137 | Coburn, Lindsay | 14 |
| 138 | Edwards, Lynn | 11 |
| 139 | McReady, Laura | 55 |
| 140 | Wieczorek, Klaudia | 11 |
| 141 | Bunten, Linsey | 37 |
| 142 | Cooney, Sara | 4 |
| 143 | Mahon, Christine | 4 |
| 144 | Runciman, Jill | 12 |
| 145 | Boulton, Laura | 9 |
| 146 | Clayton, Caroline | 10 |
| 147 | Penny, Claire | 16 |
| 148 | Smy, Catherine | 35 |
| 149 | Wheatley, Kay | 18 |
| 150 | Gow, Hazel | 13 |
| 151 | Hall, Aileen | 3 |
| 152 | Jones, Jennifer | 3 |
| 153 | Krawczyk, Jennifer | 6 |
| 154 | McLean, Kirsty | 37 |
| 155 | Clarkson, Emma | 3 |
| 156 | Dickenson, Alex | 18 |
| 157 | Hunter, Sophie | 1 |
| 158 | Kennie, Fiona | 4 |
| 159 | McEwan, Caitlin | 13 |
| 160 | Smith, Emily | 1 |
| 161 | MurrayMcKinlay, Carly | 39 |
| 162 | Symonds, Naomi | 6 |
| 163 | Agnew, Mhairi | 34 |
| 164 | Barbour, Katie | 34 |
| 165 | Gill, Priya | 5 |
| 166 | Ramage, Claire | 19 |
| 167 | Fraser, Shona | 25 |
| 168 | Gill, Raveen | 7 |
| 169 | Ramage, Nicole | 13 |
| 170 | Waldie, Emma | 25 |
| 171 | Morrison, Rachel | 22 |
| 172 | Rutherford, Chloe | 12 |
| 173 | Fowler, Samantha | 14 |
| 174 | Baillie, Laura | 5 |
| 175 | Hall, Megan | 2 |
| 176 | Hamilton, Heather | 2 |
| 177 | Murphy, Rhian | 2 |
| 178 | Quinn, Megan | 2 |
| 179 | Ranklin, Ellen | 5 |
| 180 | Ross, Kirsty | 2 |
| 181 | Stewart, Ellie | 2 |
| 182 | Gillies, Jessica | 3 |
| 183 | Lee, Jennifer | 3 |
| 184 | Wrobleska, Karolina | 3 |

== Notable events ==
=== Interruption of Season 2019–20 ===
On 13 March 2020, the day before the Scottish Cup and Plate Semi-finals were due to take place, the 2019–20 season was interrupted as part of the country's response to the COVID-19 pandemic. As of the end of April 2020, an SVA Board decision on the outcome of the season's outstanding competitions was still to be finalised. In May 2020, a final decision was made on the outcome of competitions in the 2019-20 season. The national knockout competitions (Scottish Cup and Scottish Plate) were declared null and void. Winners were declared for Men's and Women's SVL Premier as well as Women's SVL One; no winner was declared for Men's SVL One because there was not a clear enough margin between teams.

=== Men's U20 European Championships 2024 ===
In January 2024, Scotland became the first UK Volleyball Federation to qualify to a European Championship Finals ever by winning the 2024 CEV SCA U20 Men's Championships in Dublin, Ireland. The Scotland U20 Men's National Team were the fourth Scotland team to win a CEV SCA Championships (after U20 Men in 2014, Senior Men in 2019, and Senior Women in 2021) and following a change in CEV rules, were eligible to directly qualify for the Finals to be held in Serbia and Greece in August/September 2024.
