= 2006 FIVB Women's Volleyball World Championship qualification (CSV) =

The CSV qualification for the 2006 FIVB Women's Volleyball World Championship saw member nations compete for two places at the finals in Japan.

== Draw ==
5 CSV national teams entered qualification. The teams were seeded according to their position in the FIVB Senior Women's Rankings as of 15 January 2004. (Rankings shown in brackets)

First round

Pool A

Brazil (3)
Argentina (13)
Peru (19)
Ecuador (—)
Uruguay (—)

== First round ==
=== Pool A ===
- Venue: Ginásio Aracy Machado, Cabo Frio, Brazil
- Dates: August 24–28, 2005
- All times are Brasília time (UTC−03:00)

Pos	Team	Pld	W	L	Pts	SW	SL	SR	SPW	SPL	SPR
1	Brazil	4	4	0	8	12	0	MAX	300	163	1.840
2	Peru	4	3	1	7	9	3	3.000	276	210	1.314
3	Argentina	4	2	2	6	6	6	1.000	261	236	1.106
4	Uruguay	4	1	3	5	3	9	0.333	208	290	0.717
5	Ecuador	4	0	4	4	0	12	0.000	155	301	0.515

Date	Time		Score		Set 1	Set 2	Set 3	Set 4	Set 5	Total	Report
24 Aug	17:00	Uruguay	0–3	Peru	13–25	16–25	13–25			42–75	Report
24 Aug	20:00	Brazil	3–0	Ecuador	25–9	25–10	25–5			75–24	Report
25 Aug	17:00	Argentina	3–0	Ecuador	25–16	25–7	25–9			75–32	Report
25 Aug	20:00	Brazil	3–0	Uruguay	25–7	25–16	25–13			75–36	Report
26 Aug	17:00	Argentina	3–0	Uruguay	25–12	25–22	25–20			75–54	Report
26 Aug	20:00	Brazil	3–0	Peru	25–13	25–19	25–19			75–51	Report
27 Aug	10:00	Ecuador	0–3	Uruguay	18–25	24–26	23–25			65–76	Report
27 Aug	12:30	Argentina	0–3	Peru	20–25	19–25	20–25			59–75	Report
28 Aug	10:00	Ecuador	0–3	Peru	11–25	10–25	13–25			34–75	Report
28 Aug	12:30	Brazil	3–0	Argentina	25–10	25–20	25–22			75–52	Report
