= 2006 FIVB Women's Volleyball World Championship qualification (AVC) =

The AVC qualification for the 2006 FIVB Women's Volleyball World Championship saw member nations compete for four places at the finals in Japan.

== Draw ==
11 AVC national teams entered qualification. (Afghanistan later withdrew) The teams were distributed according to their position in the FIVB Senior Women's Rankings as of 15 January 2004 using the serpentine system for their distribution. (Rankings shown in brackets)

First round

Pool A	Pool B
China (1); Chinese Taipei (25); Australia (27); Uzbekistan (47); ~~Afghanistan (—)~~; Jordan (—)	South Korea (8); Thailand (16); Kazakhstan (34); Philippines (44); Tonga (—)

== First round ==
=== Pool A ===
- Venue: Beilun Sports and Art Center, Ningbo, China
- Dates: August 3–7, 2005
- All times are China Standard Time (UTC+08:00)

Pos	Team	Pld	W	L	Pts	SW	SL	SR	SPW	SPL	SPR
1	China	4	4	0	8	12	0	MAX	305	147	2.075
2	Chinese Taipei	4	3	1	7	9	4	2.250	300	203	1.478
3	Australia	4	2	2	6	7	6	1.167	287	240	1.196
4	Uzbekistan	4	1	3	5	3	9	0.333	182	253	0.719
5	Jordan	4	0	4	4	0	12	0.000	69	300	0.230

Date	Time		Score		Set 1	Set 2	Set 3	Set 4	Set 5	Total	Report
03 Aug	14:00	Australia	3–0	Uzbekistan	25–10	25–15	25–14			75–39	Report
03 Aug	19:30	China	3–0	Jordan	25–2	25–4	25–3			75–9	Report
04 Aug	14:00	Jordan	0–3	Australia	8–25	5–25	8–25			21–75	Report
04 Aug	15:30	Uzbekistan	0–3	Chinese Taipei	10–25	13–25	11–25			34–75	Report
05 Aug	14:00	Chinese Taipei	3–0	Jordan	25–3	25–4	25–4			75–11	Report
05 Aug	19:30	Australia	0–3	China	15–25	11–25	28–30			54–80	Report
06 Aug	14:00	Chinese Taipei	3–1	Australia	25–15	24–26	25–18	26–24		100–83	Report
06 Aug	19:30	China	3–0	Uzbekistan	25–7	25–18	25–9			75–34	Report
07 Aug	14:00	Jordan	0–3	Uzbekistan	8–25	9–25	11–25			28–75	Report
07 Aug	19:30	China	3–0	Chinese Taipei	25–15	25–13	25–22			75–50	Report

=== Pool B ===
- Venue: Ratchaburi Gymnasium, Ratchaburi, Thailand
- Dates: August 1–5, 2005
- All times are Indochina Time (UTC+07:00)

Pos	Team	Pld	W	L	Pts	SW	SL	SR	SPW	SPL	SPR
1	South Korea	4	4	0	8	12	2	6.000	340	239	1.423
2	Kazakhstan	4	3	1	7	10	4	2.500	342	274	1.248
3	Thailand	4	2	2	6	8	6	1.333	336	259	1.297
4	Philippines	4	1	3	5	3	9	0.333	210	269	0.781
5	Tonga	4	0	4	4	0	12	0.000	113	300	0.377

Date	Time		Score		Set 1	Set 2	Set 3	Set 4	Set 5	Total	Report
01 Aug	16:00	Philippines	3–0	Tonga	25–13	25–16	25–15			75–44	Report
01 Aug	18:00	Kazakhstan	3–1	Thailand	24–26	27–25	26–24	25–19		102–94	Report
02 Aug	16:00	Tonga	0–3	South Korea	4–25	4–25	5–25			13–75	Report
02 Aug	18:00	Philippines	0–3	Kazakhstan	16–25	18–25	22–25			56–75	Report
03 Aug	16:00	Tonga	0–3	Kazakhstan	4–25	16–25	9–25			29–75	Report
03 Aug	18:00	South Korea	3–1	Thailand	25–20	19–25	25–23	26–24		95–92	Report
04 Aug	16:00	South Korea	3–1	Kazakhstan	19–25	26–24	25–22	25–19		95–90	Report
04 Aug	18:00	Thailand	3–0	Philippines	25–11	25–15	25–9			75–35	Report
05 Aug	16:00	South Korea	3–0	Philippines	25–14	25–17	25–13			75–44	Report
05 Aug	18:00	Thailand	3–0	Tonga	25–5	25–8	25–14			75–27	Report
