= 2018 FIVB Women's Volleyball World Championship qualification =

The 2018 FIVB Women's Volleyball World Championship qualification is a series of tournaments to decide teams which will play in the 2018 FIVB Women's Volleyball World Championship. The 2018 World Championship will feature 24 teams. Two places were allocated to the hosts, Japan and the titleholder, United States. The remaining 22 places will be determined by a qualification process in which entrants from among the other teams from the five FIVB confederations will compete.

== Qualified teams ==
Team qualified for World Championship Team may qualify for World Championship Team failed to qualify for World Championship Team withdrew for World Championship Team expelled from the tournament by FIVB prior to playing a match

Country	Confederation	Qualified as	Qualified on	Previous appearances		
Country	Confederation	Qualified as	Qualified on	Total	First	Last
Japan	AVC	Host Country	25 August 2014	15	1960	2014
United States	NORCECA	Defending Champions	12 October 2014	15	1956	2014
Serbia^{1}	CEV	CEV Second Round Pool B Winners	28 May 2017	4	1978	2014
Russia^{2}	CEV	CEV Second Round Pool A Winners	3 June 2017	16	1952	2014
Azerbaijan	CEV	CEV Second Round Pool E Winners	3 June 2017	3	1994	2014
Turkey	CEV	CEV Second Round Pool C Winners	4 June 2017	3	2006	2014
Italy	CEV	CEV Second Round Pool D Winners	4 June 2017	10	1978	2014
Germany^{3}	CEV	CEV Second Round Pool F Winners	4 June 2017	15	1956	2014
Brazil	CSV	CSV Championship Winners	19 August 2017	15	1956	2014
Netherlands	CEV	CEV Third Round Pool G Winners	26 August 2017	13	1956	2014
Bulgaria	CEV	CEV Third Round Pool G Runners-up	26 August 2017	11	1952	2014
China	AVC	AVC Second Round Pool A Winners	23 September 2017	13	1956	2014
South Korea	AVC	AVC Second Round Pool B Winners	23 September 2017	11	1967	2010
Thailand	AVC	AVC Second Round Pool B Runners-up	23 September 2017	4	1998	2014
Kazakhstan	AVC	AVC Second Round Pool A Runners-up	24 September 2017	3	2006	2014
Canada	NORCECA	NORCECA Championship Pool B Winners	29 September 2017	8	1974	2014
Cuba	NORCECA	NORCECA Championship Pool B Runners-up	29 September 2017	12	1970	2014
Cameroon	CAVB	CAVB Championship Winners	13 October 2017	2	2006	2014
Kenya	CAVB	CAVB Championship Runners-up	13 October 2017	5	1994	2010
Dominican Republic	NORCECA	NORCECA Championship Pool A Winners	14 October 2017	7	1974	2014
Mexico	NORCECA	NORCECA Championship Pool C Winners	14 October 2017	7	1970	2014
Puerto Rico	NORCECA	NORCECA Championship Pool A Runners-up	14 October 2017	6	1974	2014
Trinidad and Tobago	NORCECA	NORCECA Championship Pool C Runners-up	14 October 2017	0	–	–
Argentina	CSV	CSV Qualifier Winners	15 October 2017	5	1960	2014

Notes
^{1} Competed as SFR Yugoslavia in 1978 and as Serbia and Montenegro (FR Yugoslavia) in 2006; 3rd appearance as Serbia.
^{2} Competed as Soviet Union from 1952 to 1990; 7th appearance as Russia.
^{3} Competed separately as East and West Germany from 1956 to 1990; 7th appearance as Unified Germany.

== Qualification process ==
The distribution by confederation for the 2018 FIVB Women's Volleyball World Championship will be:

- Asia and Oceania (AVC): 4 places (Japan qualified automatically as host nations for a total of 5 places)
- Africa (CAVB): 2 places
- Europe (CEV): 8 places
- South America (CSV): 2 places
- North America (NORCECA): 6 places (United States qualified automatically as the reigning champions for a total of 7 places)

=== Summary of qualification ===
Confederation	Teams started	Teams that have qualified	Qualifier start date	Qualifier end date
AVC	12+1	4+1	27 January 2017	24 September 2017
CAVB	16	2	29 April 2017	13 October 2017
CEV	42	8	23 May 2016	27 August 2017
CSV	7	2	15 August 2017	15 October 2017
NORCECA	38+1	6+1	6 August 2016	15 October 2017
Total	115+2	22+2	23 May 2016	15 October 2017

Note: AVC total includes +1 for Japan as hosts.
Note: NORCECA total includes +1 for United States as reigning champions.

=== Pool standing procedure ===
1. Number of matches won
2. Match points
3. Sets ratio
4. Points ratio
5. Result of the last match between the tied teams

Match won 3–0 or 3–1: 3 match points for the winner, 0 match points for the loser.
Match won 3–2: 2 match points for the winner, 1 match point for the loser.

NORCECA only

Match won 3–0: 5 match points for the winner, 0 match points for the loser
Match won 3–1: 4 match points for the winner, 1 match point for the loser
Match won 3–2: 3 match points for the winner, 2 match points for the loser

== Confederation qualification ==
=== AVC (Asia and Oceania) ===
Format

- First round: The bottom ranked teams of Asia were divided into three groups of three zonal association. The group winners advanced to the second round of FIVB World Championship qualification.
- Second round: A total of 10 teams (teams ranked 1–7 and three first round winners) were divided into two groups of five teams. The top two teams of each group qualified for the 2018 FIVB World Championship.

==== Teams ====
- Australia (second round)
- China (second round → Qualified)
- Chinese Taipei (second round)
- Fiji (first round → Second Round)
- Iran (first round → Second Round)
- Kazakhstan (second round → Qualified)
- Maldives (first round)
- Nepal (first round)
- North Korea (first round → Second Round)
- South Korea (second round → Qualified)
- Thailand (second round → Qualified)
- Vietnam (second round)

Withdrawal

- Bangladesh (~~First Round~~)
- Macau (~~First Round~~)
- New Zealand (~~First Round~~)
- Tonga (~~First Round~~)
- Uzbekistan (~~First Round~~)

Suspension

- India (~~First Round~~)

==== Final positions (second round) ====
The draw for the second round was held on 19 March 2017, at the Dusit Princess Srinakarin Hotel in Bangkok, Thailand.

Qualification to 2018 World Championship

Pool A
Rank	Team	Pld	W	Pts
1	China	4	4	12
2	Kazakhstan	4	3	9
3	Chinese Taipei	4	2	6
4	Australia	4	1	3
5	Fiji	4	0	0

Pool B
Rank	Team	Pld	W	Pts
1	South Korea	4	4	12
2	Thailand	4	3	9
3	North Korea	4	2	6
4	Vietnam	4	1	3
5	Iran	4	0	0

=== CAVB (Africa) ===
Format

- First round: The bottom ranked tean of Africa were divided into seven groups of seven zonal association, later six groups of six zonal association. The group winners and runners-up advanced to the second round of FIVB World Championship qualification and CAVB Championship in Cameroon.
- Second round (CAVB Championship): A total of 13 teams (hosts, teams ranked 1–2 of Africa, nine first round winners and two wildcard teams), later 9 teams were divided into two groups. The top two teams of each group advanced to the play-offs. The winners of play-offs will qualified for the 2018 FIVB World Championship.

==== Teams ====
- Algeria (first round → CAVB Championship)
- Botswana (first round → CAVB Championship)
- Cameroon (CAVB Championship → Qualified)
- Cape Verde (first round → ~~CAVB Championship~~)
- DR Congo (first round → CAVB Championship)
- Egypt (first round → CAVB Championship)
- Ghana (first round → ~~CAVB Championship~~)
- Ivory Coast (first round)
- Kenya (CAVB Championship → Qualified)
- Mozambique (first round → ~~CAVB Championship~~)
- Nigeria (first round → CAVB Championship)
- Rwanda (first round)
- Senegal (first round → CAVB Championship)
- Eswatini (first round)
- Tunisia (first round → CAVB Championship)
- Uganda (first round)

Withdrawal

- Burundi (~~First Round~~)
- Chad (~~CAVB Championship~~)
- Central African Republic (~~First Round~~)
- Gabon (~~First Round~~)
- Gambia (~~First Round~~)
- Lesotho (~~First Round~~)
- Libya (~~First Round~~)
- Madagascar (~~First Round~~)
- Malawi (~~First Round~~)
- Mauritius (~~First Round~~)
- Namibia (~~First Round~~)
- Niger (~~First Round~~)
- Seychelles (~~First Round~~)
- Sudan (~~First Round~~)
- Tanzania (~~First Round~~)
- Zambia (~~CAVB Championship~~)
- Zimbabwe (~~First Round~~)

==== Final positions (CAVB Championship) ====
Preliminary round

Qualification to Play-offs

Pool A
Rank	Team	Pld	W	Pts
1	Cameroon	3	3	9
2	Egypt	3	2	6
3	Algeria	3	1	2
4	Botswana	3	0	1

Pool B
Rank	Team	Pld	W	Pts
1	Kenya	4	4	12
2	Senegal	4	3	9
3	Tunisia	4	2	6
4	Nigeria	4	1	3
5	DR Congo	4	0	0

Play-offs

Winners qualified for 2018 World Championship

Date	Time		Score		Set 1	Set 2	Set 3	Set 4	Set 5	Total	Report
13 Oct	16:00	Kenya	3–0	Egypt	25–23	25–22	25–19			75–64	
13 Oct	18:00	Cameroon	3–0	Senegal	25–19	25–20	27–25			77–64	

=== CEV (Europe) ===
==== Teams ====
- Austria (second round)
- Azerbaijan (second round → Qualified)
- Belgium (second round → Third Round)
- Bosnia and Herzegovina (second round)
- Belarus (second round)
- Bulgaria (second round → Third Round → Qualified)
- Croatia (second round)
- Cyprus (first round → Second Round)
- Czech Republic (second round → Third Round)
- Denmark (second round)
- Estonia (second round)
- Faroe Islands (first round)
- Finland (second round)
- France (second round)
- Georgia (second round)
- Germany (second round → Qualified)
- Greece (second round → Third Round)
- Hungary (second round)
- Ireland (first round)
- Iceland ((first round → Second Round)
- Israel (second round)
- Italy (second round → Qualified)
- Kosovo (second round)
- Latvia (second round)
- Liechtenstein (first round)
- Luxembourg (first round)
- Montenegro (second round)
- Netherlands (second round → Third Round → Qualified)
- Northern Ireland (first round)
- Norway (second round)
- Poland (second round)
- Portugal (second round)
- Romania (second round)
- Russia (second round → Qualified)
- Scotland (first round)
- Serbia (second round → Qualified)
- Slovakia (second round)
- Slovenia (second round → Third Round)
- Spain (second round)
- Switzerland (second round)
- Turkey (second round → Qualified)
- Ukraine (second round)

==== Final positions (second round) ====
Qualification to 2018 World Championship
Qualification to Third round

Pool A
Rank	Team	Pld	W	Pts
1	Russia	5	5	15
2	Greece	5	4	11
3	Hungary	5	2	7
4	Croatia	5	2	7
5	Austria	5	2	5
6	Georgia	5	0	0

Pool C
Rank	Team	Pld	W	Pts
1	Turkey	5	5	14
2	Bulgaria	5	4	13
3	Romania	5	3	9
4	Switzerland	5	2	6
5	Montenegro	5	1	3
6	Kosovo	5	0	0

Pool E
Rank	Team	Pld	W	Pts
1	Azerbaijan	5	5	15
2	Netherlands	5	4	12
3	Ukraine	5	3	9
4	Israel	5	2	6
5	Norway	5	1	3
6	Denmark	5	0	0

Pool B
Rank	Team	Pld	W	Pts
1	Serbia	5	5	15
2	Czech Republic	5	4	11
3	Poland	5	3	10
4	Slovakia	5	2	6
5	Cyprus	5	1	3
6	Iceland	5	0	0

Pool D
Rank	Team	Pld	W	Pts
1	Italy	5	5	15
2	Belgium	5	4	12
3	Belarus	5	3	8
4	Spain	5	2	5
5	Bosnia and Herzegovina	5	1	5
6	Latvia	5	0	0

Pool F
Rank	Team	Pld	W	Pts
1	Germany	5	5	15
2	Slovenia	5	4	12
3	Portugal	5	3	7
4	Estonia	5	2	5
5	Finland	5	1	4
6	France	5	0	2

==== Third round ====
Qualification to 2018 World Championship

Pool G
Rank	Team	Pld	W	Pts
1	Netherlands	5	5	15
2	Bulgaria	5	4	12
3	Belgium	5	3	8
4	Czech Republic	5	2	6
5	Slovenia	5	1	3
6	Greece	5	0	1

=== CSV (South America) ===
==== Teams ====
- Argentina (CSV Championship → CSV Qualifier → Qualified)
- Brazil (CSV Championship → Qualified)
- Chile (CSV Championship)
- Colombia (CSV Championship → CSV Qualifier)
- Peru (CSV Championship → CSV Qualifier)
- Uruguay (CSV Qualifier)
- Venezuela (CSV Championship)

==== Final positions (CSV Championship) ====
Qualification to 2018 World Championship

CSV Championship
Rank	Team	Pld	W	Pts
1	Brazil	5	5	15
2	Colombia	5	4	11
3	Peru	5	3	9
4	Argentina	5	2	7
5	Venezuela	5	1	3
6	Chile	5	0	0

==== CSV Qualifier ====
Qualification to 2018 World Championship

CSV Qualifier
Rank	Team	Pld	W	Pts
1	Argentina	3	3	9
2	Colombia	3	2	6
3	Peru	3	1	3
4	Uruguay	3	0	0

=== NORCECA ===
==== Teams ====
- Anguilla (first round)
- Antigua and Barbuda (first round → Second Round)
- Aruba (first round)
- Bahamas (first round → Second Round)
- Barbados (first round)
- Bermuda (first round → ~~Second Round~~)
- Bonaire (first round)
- British Virgin Islands (first round)
- Canada (NORCECA Championship → Qualified)
- Cayman Islands (first round)
- Costa Rica (NORCECA Championship)
- Cuba (NORCECA Championship → Qualified)
- Curaçao (first round → Second Round)
- Dominica (second round → NORCECA Championship)
- Dominican Republic (NORCECA Championship → Qualified)
- El Salvador (first round)
- Grenada (first round → Second Round)
- Guadeloupe (first round → Second Round)
- Guatemala (first round → NORCECA Championship)
- Jamaica (second round → NORCECA Championship)
- Haiti (first round)
- Honduras (first round)
- Martinique (first round → Second Round)
- Mexico (NORCECA Championship → Qualified)
- Nicaragua (first round → NORCECA Championship)
- Panama (first round)
- Puerto Rico (NORCECA Championship → Qualified)
- Saba (first round)
- Saint Kitts and Nevis (first round → Second Round)
- Saint Lucia (second round → NORCECA Championship)
- Saint Martin (first round → ~~Second Round~~)
- Saint Vincent and the Grenadines (first round )
- Sint Eustatius (first round)
- Sint Maarten (first round → Second Round)
- Suriname (first round → Second Round)
- Trinidad and Tobago (second round → NORCECA Championship → Qualified)
- Turks and Caicos Islands (first round)
- U.S. Virgin Islands (first round → Second Round)

==== Final positions (NORCECA Continental Championship) ====
Qualification to 2018 World Championship

Pool A
Rank	Team	Pld	W	Pts
1	Dominican Republic	3	3	15
2	Puerto Rico	3	2	10
3	Guatemala	3	1	5
4	Jamaica	3	0	0

Pool B
Rank	Team	Pld	W	Pts
1	Canada	3	3	15
2	Cuba	3	2	10
3	Nicaragua	3	1	5
4	Saint Lucia	3	0	0

Pool C
Rank	Team	Pld	W	Pts
1	Mexico	3	3	13
2	Trinidad and Tobago	3	2	12
3	Costa Rica	3	1	5
4	Dominica	3	0	0
