= 2018 FIVB Women's Volleyball World Championship qualification (CEV) =

Volleyball championship

The CEV qualification for the 2018 FIVB Women's Volleyball World Championship will see member nations compete for eight places at the finals in Japan.

== Pools composition ==
42 CEV national teams will enter qualification.

=== First round ===
8 Small Countries Division teams will participate in the first round. The first round will also act as the 2017 European Championship Small Countries Division qualification round.

Pool A	Pool B
Cyprus	Scotland
Faroe Islands	Luxembourg
Liechtenstein	Iceland
Ireland	Northern Ireland

=== Second round ===
Pool A	Pool B	Pool C
Croatia	Poland	Bulgaria
Russia	Serbia	Turkey
Hungary	Czech Republic	Romania
Greece	Slovakia	Switzerland
Austria	Cyprus	Montenegro
Georgia	Iceland	Kosovo

Pool D	Pool E	Pool F
Belgium	Azerbaijan	Portugal
Italy	Netherlands	Germany
Belarus	Israel	France
Spain	Ukraine	Finland
Latvia	Denmark	Slovenia
Bosnia and Herzegovina	Norway	Estonia

=== Third round ===
	Pool G
Second round Pool A runner-up	Greece
Second round Pool B runner-up	Czech Republic
Second round Pool C runner-up	Bulgaria
Second round Pool D runner-up	Belgium
Second round Pool E runner-up	Netherlands
Second round Pool F runner-up	Slovenia

== Pool standing procedure ==
1. Number of matches won
2. Match points
3. Sets ratio
4. Points ratio
5. Result of the last match between the tied teams

Match won 3–0 or 3–1: 3 match points for the winner, 0 match points for the loser
Match won 3–2: 2 match points for the winner, 1 match point for the loser

== First round ==
- The top teams in each pool will qualify for the second round and the 2017 European Championship Small Countries Division final round.

=== Pool A ===
- Venue: Tórshavnar Ittrottar, Tórshavn, Faroe Islands
- Dates: 23–25 May 2016
- All times are Western European Summer Time (UTC+01:00).

Pos	Team	Pld	W	L	Pts	SW	SL	SR	SPW	SPL	SPR	Qualification
1	Cyprus	3	3	0	9	9	1	9.000	244	162	1.506	Second round
2	Faroe Islands	3	2	1	6	7	3	2.333	223	176	1.267	
3	Liechtenstein	3	1	2	3	3	6	0.500	182	181	1.006	
4	Ireland	3	0	3	0	0	9	0.000	95	225	0.422	

Date	Time		Score		Set 1	Set 2	Set 3	Set 4	Set 5	Total	Report
23 May	17:00	Liechtenstein	0–3	Cyprus	19–25	16–25	21–25			56–75	Report
23 May	20:00	Faroe Islands	3–0	Ireland	25–8	25–12	25–11			75–31	Report
24 May	17:00	Cyprus	3–0	Ireland	25–12	25–9	25–12			75–33	Report
24 May	20:00	Liechtenstein	0–3	Faroe Islands	15–25	15–25	21–25			51–75	Report
25 May	17:00	Ireland	0–3	Liechtenstein	14–25	7–25	10–25			31–75	Report
25 May	20:00	Cyprus	3–1	Faroe Islands	25–21	25–14	19–25	25–13		94–73	Report

=== Pool B ===
- Venue: d'Coque Gymnase, Luxembourg City, Luxembourg
- Dates: 24–26 June 2016
- All times are Central European Summer Time (UTC+02:00).

Pos	Team	Pld	W	L	Pts	SW	SL	SR	SPW	SPL	SPR	Qualification
1	Iceland	3	3	0	9	9	1	9.000	246	157	1.567	Second round
2	Scotland	3	2	1	6	6	4	1.500	218	194	1.124	
3	Luxembourg	3	1	2	3	5	6	0.833	244	223	1.094	
4	Northern Ireland	3	0	3	0	0	9	0.000	91	225	0.404	

Date	Time		Score		Set 1	Set 2	Set 3	Set 4	Set 5	Total	Report
24 Jun	17:00	Iceland	3–0	Scotland	25–21	25–14	25–17			75–52	Report
24 Jun	19:30	Luxembourg	3–0	Northern Ireland	25–18	25–11	25–7			75–36	Report
25 Jun	17:00	Scotland	3–0	Northern Ireland	25–13	25–4	25–11			75–28	Report
25 Jun	19:30	Iceland	3–1	Luxembourg	21–25	25–19	25–17	25–17		96–78	Report
26 Jun	15:30	Northern Ireland	0–3	Iceland	8–25	13–25	6–25			27–75	Report
26 Jun	18:00	Scotland	3–1	Luxembourg	25–23	16–25	25–23	25–20		91–91	Report

== Second round ==
- The winners in each pool will qualify for the 2018 World Championship whereas the runners-up in each pool will qualify for the third round.

=== Pool A ===
- Venue: Gradski vrt Hall, Osijek, Croatia
- Dates: 31 May – 4 June 2017

Pos	Team	Pld	W	L	Pts	SW	SL	SR	SPW	SPL	SPR	Qualification
1	Russia	5	5	0	15	15	2	7.500	419	266	1.575	2018 World Championship
2	Greece	5	4	1	11	13	6	2.167	425	392	1.084	Third round
3	Hungary	5	2	3	7	10	11	0.909	436	428	1.019	
4	Croatia	5	2	3	7	9	10	0.900	426	424	1.005	
5	Austria	5	2	3	5	8	11	0.727	394	419	0.940	
6	Georgia	5	0	5	0	0	15	0.000	207	378	0.548	

Date	Time		Score		Set 1	Set 2	Set 3	Set 4	Set 5	Total	Report
31 May	15:00	Russia	3–0	Austria	25–14	25–13	25–15			75–42	Report
31 May	17:30	Greece	3–2	Hungary	25–18	20–25	20–25	25–21	15–13	105–102	Report
31 May	20:00	Georgia	0–3	Croatia	26–28	11–25	18–25			55–78	Report
1 Jun	15:00	Austria	3–2	Hungary	27–29	25–22	25–18	11–25	15–12	103–106	Report
1 Jun	17:30	Russia	3–0	Georgia	25–8	25–6	25–13			75–27	Report
1 Jun	20:00	Croatia	0–3	Greece	21–25	23–25	18–25			62–75	Report
2 Jun	15:00	Georgia	0–3	Austria	14–25	16–25	14–25			44–75	Report
2 Jun	17:30	Greece	1–3	Russia	10–25	26–24	16–25	23–25		75–99	Report
2 Jun	20:00	Hungary	3–2	Croatia	19–25	30–32	25–15	25–21	15–11	114–104	Report
3 Jun	15:00	Georgia	0–3	Greece	13–25	13–25	14–25			40–75	Report
3 Jun	17:30	Russia	3–0	Hungary	25–11	25–21	25–7			75–39	Report
3 Jun	20:00	Austria	1–3	Croatia	25–23	24–26	20–25	16–25		85–99	Report
4 Jun	15:00	Hungary	3–0	Georgia	25–12	25–8	25–21			75–41	Report
4 Jun	17:30	Greece	3–1	Austria	20–25	25–19	25–22	25–23		95–89	Report
4 Jun	20:00	Croatia	1–3	Russia	22–25	21–25	25–20	15–25		83–95	Report

=== Pool B ===
- Venue: Torwar Hall, Warsaw, Poland
- Dates: 23–28 May 2017

Pos	Team	Pld	W	L	Pts	SW	SL	SR	SPW	SPL	SPR	Qualification
1	Serbia	5	5	0	15	15	0	MAX	376	221	1.701	2018 World Championship
2	Czech Republic	5	4	1	11	12	6	2.000	416	327	1.272	Third round
3	Poland	5	3	2	10	11	7	1.571	402	353	1.139	
4	Slovakia	5	2	3	6	8	9	0.889	344	350	0.983	
5	Cyprus	5	1	4	3	3	12	0.250	244	365	0.668	
6	Iceland	5	0	5	0	0	15	0.000	210	376	0.559	

Date	Time		Score		Set 1	Set 2	Set 3	Set 4	Set 5	Total	Report
23 May	15:30	Slovakia	1–3	Czech Republic	25–18	15–25	17–25	16–25		73–93	Report
23 May	18:00	Serbia	3–0	Iceland	25–13	25–15	25–9			75–37	Report
23 May	20:30	Cyprus	0–3	Poland	14–25	17–25	15–25			46–75	Report
24 May	15:30	Czech Republic	0–3	Serbia	19–25	18–25	24–26			61–76	Report
24 May	18:00	Cyprus	0–3	Slovakia	15–25	13–25	10–25			38–75	Report
24 May	20:30	Poland	3–0	Iceland	25–16	25–5	25–18			75–39	Report
25 May	15:30	Serbia	3–0	Cyprus	25–10	25–12	25–15			75–37	Report
25 May	18:00	Iceland	0–3	Czech Republic	6–25	7–25	13–25			26–75	Report
25 May	20:30	Slovakia	1–3	Poland	19–25	15–25	28–26	19–25		81–101	Report
27 May	15:30	Cyprus	3–0	Iceland	25–20	26–24	25–21			76–65	Report
27 May	18:00	Slovakia	0–3	Serbia	8–25	14–25	18–25			40–75	Report
27 May	20:30	Poland	2–3	Czech Republic	35–33	14–25	25–14	22–25	9–15	105–112	Report
28 May	15:30	Iceland	0–3	Slovakia	11–25	21–25	11–25			43–75	Report
28 May	18:00	Czech Republic	3–0	Cyprus	25–18	25–14	25–15			75–47	Report
28 May	20:30	Serbia	3–0	Poland	25–15	25–16	25–15			75–46	Report

=== Pool C ===
- Venue: Hristo Botev Hall, Sofia, Bulgaria
- Dates: 31 May – 4 June 2017

Pos	Team	Pld	W	L	Pts	SW	SL	SR	SPW	SPL	SPR	Qualification
1	Turkey	5	5	0	14	15	2	7.500	401	280	1.432	2018 World Championship
2	Bulgaria	5	4	1	13	14	3	4.667	409	268	1.526	Third round
3	Romania	5	3	2	9	9	7	1.286	356	322	1.106	
4	Switzerland	5	2	3	6	7	9	0.778	312	335	0.931	
5	Montenegro	5	1	4	3	3	12	0.250	272	332	0.819	
6	Kosovo	5	0	5	0	0	15	0.000	162	375	0.432	

Date	Time		Score		Set 1	Set 2	Set 3	Set 4	Set 5	Total	Report
31 May	15:00	Turkey	3–0	Kosovo	25–5	25–13	25–10			75–28	Report
31 May	17:30	Bulgaria	3–0	Switzerland	25–8	25–9	25–20			75–37	Report
31 May	20:00	Romania	3–0	Montenegro	25–23	25–15	25–16			75–54	Report
1 Jun	15:00	Switzerland	0–3	Turkey	16–25	11–25	17–25			44–75	Report
1 Jun	17:30	Montenegro	3–0	Kosovo	25–20	25–7	25–5			75–32	Report
1 Jun	20:00	Romania	0–3	Bulgaria	23–25	15–25	21–25			59–75	Report
2 Jun	15:00	Kosovo	0–3	Switzerland	11–25	8–25	15–25			34–75	Report
2 Jun	17:30	Bulgaria	3–0	Montenegro	25–15	25–12	25–13			75–40	Report
2 Jun	20:00	Turkey	3–0	Romania	25–14	25–19	25–18			75–51	Report
3 Jun	15:00	Montenegro	0–3	Switzerland	22–25	16–25	17–25			55–75	Report
3 Jun	17:30	Bulgaria	2–3	Turkey	25–23	23–25	23–25	25–13	13–15	109–101	Report
3 Jun	20:00	Romania	3–0	Kosovo	25–12	25–12	25–13			75–37	Report
4 Jun	15:00	Turkey	3–0	Montenegro	25–16	25–13	25–19			75–48	Report
4 Jun	17:30	Switzerland	1–3	Romania	25–21	19–25	16–25	21–25		81–96	Report
4 Jun	20:00	Kosovo	0–3	Bulgaria	8–25	13–25	10–25			31–75	Report

=== Pool D ===
- Venue: Lange Munte, Kortrijk, Belgium
- Dates: 31 May – 4 June 2017

Pos	Team	Pld	W	L	Pts	SW	SL	SR	SPW	SPL	SPR	Qualification
1	Italy	5	5	0	15	15	0	MAX	376	245	1.535	2018 World Championship
2	Belgium	5	4	1	12	12	4	3.000	391	315	1.241	Third round
3	Belarus	5	3	2	8	10	8	1.250	400	377	1.061	
4	Spain	5	2	3	5	6	11	0.545	332	371	0.895	
5	Bosnia and Herzegovina	5	1	4	5	7	13	0.538	404	443	0.912	
6	Latvia	5	0	5	0	1	15	0.067	248	400	0.620	

Date	Time		Score		Set 1	Set 2	Set 3	Set 4	Set 5	Total	Report
31 May	15:00	Spain	0–3	Belarus	14–25	20–25	13–25			47–75	Report
31 May	17:30	Belgium	3–0	Latvia	25–17	25–13	25–12			75–42	Report
31 May	20:00	Bosnia and Herzegovina	0–3	Italy	12–25	12–25	13–25			37–75	Report
1 Jun	15:00	Spain	0–3	Belgium	21–25	18–25	14–25			53–75	Report
1 Jun	17:30	Belarus	0–3	Italy	12–25	24–26	22–25			58–76	Report
1 Jun	20:00	Latvia	1–3	Bosnia and Herzegovina	11–25	21–25	27–25	12–25		71–100	Report
2 Jun	15:00	Italy	3–0	Latvia	25–12	25–9	25–16			75–37	Report
2 Jun	17:30	Belgium	3–1	Belarus	25–23	23–25	25–17	25–17		98–82	Report
2 Jun	20:00	Bosnia and Herzegovina	2–3	Spain	25–22	20–25	25–20	23–25	10–15	103–107	Report
3 Jun	15:00	Belarus	3–0	Latvia	25–19	25–20	25–16			75–55	Report
3 Jun	17:30	Spain	0–3	Italy	17–25	18–25	15–25			50–75	Report
3 Jun	20:00	Belgium	3–0	Bosnia and Herzegovina	25–19	30–28	25–16			80–63	Report
4 Jun	15:00	Latvia	0–3	Spain	8–25	16–25	19–25			43–75	Report
4 Jun	17:30	Bosnia and Herzegovina	2–3	Belarus	17–25	25–27	25–18	27–25	7–15	101–110	Report
4 Jun	20:00	Italy	3–0	Belgium	25–18	25–22	25–23			75–63	Report

=== Pool E ===
- Venue: Sports Games Palace, Baku, Azerbaijan
- Dates: 30 May – 3 June 2017

Pos	Team	Pld	W	L	Pts	SW	SL	SR	SPW	SPL	SPR	Qualification
1	Azerbaijan	5	5	0	15	15	0	MAX	380	230	1.652	2018 World Championship
2	Netherlands	5	4	1	12	12	5	2.400	410	313	1.310	Third round
3	Ukraine	5	3	2	9	10	7	1.429	393	353	1.113	
4	Israel	5	2	3	6	7	10	0.700	329	382	0.861	
5	Norway	5	1	4	3	5	13	0.385	318	415	0.766	
6	Denmark	5	0	5	0	1	15	0.067	259	396	0.654	

Date	Time		Score		Set 1	Set 2	Set 3	Set 4	Set 5	Total	Report
30 May	15:00	Denmark	0–3	Netherlands	12–25	13–25	9–25			34–75	Report
30 May	17:30	Azerbaijan	3–0	Norway	25–15	25–10	25–6			75–31	Report
30 May	20:00	Israel	0–3	Ukraine	22–25	20–25	11–25			53–75	Report
31 May	15:00	Netherlands	3–0	Norway	25–11	25–14	25–13			75–38	Report
31 May	17:30	Ukraine	0–3	Azerbaijan	17–25	17–25	21–25			55–75	Report
31 May	20:00	Denmark	0–3	Israel	22–25	19–25	18–25			59–75	Report
1 Jun	15:00	Norway	1–3	Ukraine	21–25	25–22	14–25	17–25		77–97	Report
1 Jun	17:30	Azerbaijan	3–0	Denmark	25–12	25–14	25–14			75–40	Report
1 Jun	20:00	Israel	1–3	Netherlands	19–25	11–25	25–22	15–25		70–97	Report
2 Jun	15:00	Denmark	1–3	Norway	25–21	15–25	23–25	15–25		78–96	Report
2 Jun	17:30	Israel	0–3	Azerbaijan	9–25	14–25	18–25			41–75	Report
2 Jun	20:00	Netherlands	3–1	Ukraine	30–28	18–25	25–13	27–25		100–91	Report
3 Jun	15:00	Norway	1–3	Israel	19–25	25–15	17–25	15–25		76–90	Report
3 Jun	17:30	Azerbaijan	3–0	Netherlands	30–28	25–22	25–13			80–63	Report
3 Jun	20:00	Ukraine	3–0	Denmark	25–14	25–18	25–16			75–48	Report

=== Pool F ===
- Venue: Centro Cultural de Viana do Castelo, Viana do Castelo, Portugal
- Dates: 31 May – 4 June 2017

Pos	Team	Pld	W	L	Pts	SW	SL	SR	SPW	SPL	SPR	Qualification
1	Germany	5	5	0	15	15	2	7.500	412	331	1.245	2018 World Championship
2	Slovenia	5	4	1	12	12	3	4.000	361	294	1.228	Third round
3	Portugal	5	3	2	7	10	10	1.000	415	441	0.941	
4	Estonia	5	2	3	5	6	12	0.500	359	411	0.873	
5	Finland	5	1	4	4	6	12	0.500	393	411	0.956	
6	France	5	0	5	2	5	15	0.333	402	454	0.885	

Date	Time		Score		Set 1	Set 2	Set 3	Set 4	Set 5	Total	Report
31 May	15:00	Germany	3–0	Slovenia	25–18	25–20	25–22			75–60	Report
31 May	17:30	Portugal	3–2	France	25–21	13–25	23–25	27–25	15–13	103–109	Report
31 May	20:30	Finland	1–3	Estonia	17–25	25–17	23–25	20–25		85–92	Report
1 Jun	15:00	France	0–3	Slovenia	17–25	15–25	16–25			48–75	Report
1 Jun	17:30	Portugal	3–2	Finland	25–23	27–29	17–25	25–22	15–12	109–111	Report
1 Jun	20:30	Estonia	0–3	Germany	18–25	19–25	20–25			57–75	Report
2 Jun	15:00	Finland	3–0	France	26–24	25–18	25–17			76–59	Report
2 Jun	17:30	Germany	3–1	Portugal	25–18	25–15	15–25	25–11		90–69	Report
2 Jun	20:30	Slovenia	3–0	Estonia	25–19	25–20	25–12			75–51	Report
3 Jun	15:00	Finland	0–3	Germany	23–25	23–25	14–25			60–75	Report
3 Jun	17:30	Portugal	0–3	Slovenia	18–25	19–25	22–25			59–75	Report
3 Jun	20:30	France	2–3	Estonia	25–22	20–25	25–15	17–25	14–16	101–103	Report
4 Jun	15:00	Slovenia	3–0	Finland	25–16	25–21	26–24			76–61	Report
4 Jun	17:30	Germany	3–1	France	25–22	25–21	22–25	25–17		97–85	Report
4 Jun	20:30	Estonia	0–3	Portugal	23–25	20–25	13–25			56–75	Report

== Third round ==
- The winners and runners-up will qualify for the 2018 World Championship.

=== Pool G ===
- Venue: Topsportcentrum Rotterdam, Netherlands
- Dates: 22–27 August 2017

Pos	Team	Pld	W	L	Pts	SW	SL	SR	SPW	SPL	SPR	Qualification
1	Netherlands	5	5	0	15	15	0	MAX	375	264	1.420	2018 World Championship
2	Bulgaria	5	4	1	12	12	6	2.000	422	390	1.082	2018 World Championship
3	Belgium	5	3	2	8	9	9	1.000	391	381	1.026	
4	Czech Republic	5	2	3	6	9	11	0.818	426	430	0.991	
5	Slovenia	5	1	4	3	5	12	0.417	339	402	0.843	
6	Greece	5	0	5	1	3	15	0.200	340	426	0.798	

Date	Time		Score		Set 1	Set 2	Set 3	Set 4	Set 5	Total	Report
22 Aug	14:30	Slovenia	1–3	Bulgaria	18–25	19–25	25–20	22–25		84–95	Report
22 Aug	17:00	Belgium	3–2	Czech Republic	25–22	23–25	25–20	13–25	15–11	101–103	Report
22 Aug	19:30	Netherlands	3–0	Greece	25–13	25–13	25–18			75–44	Report
23 Aug	14:30	Czech Republic	1–3	Bulgaria	25–18	24–26	16–25	21–25		86–94	Report
23 Aug	17:00	Greece	0–3	Slovenia	17–25	22–25	19–25			58–75	Report
23 Aug	19:30	Belgium	0–3	Netherlands	18–25	18–25	22–25			58–75	Report
24 Aug	14:30	Bulgaria	3–1	Greece	26–24	21–25	25–21	25–17		97–87	Report
24 Aug	17:00	Slovenia	1–3	Belgium	24–26	13–25	25–23	23–25		85–99	Report
24 Aug	19:30	Netherlands	3–0	Czech Republic	25–18	25–22	25–18			75–58	Report
26 Aug	14:30	Netherlands	3–0	Slovenia	25–16	25–11	25–16			75–43	Report
26 Aug	17:00	Belgium	0–3	Bulgaria	17–25	22–25	19–25			58–75	Report
26 Aug	19:30	Czech Republic	3–2	Greece	25–23	22–25	26–24	16–25	15–11	104–108	Report
27 Aug	14:30	Bulgaria	0–3	Netherlands	21–25	17–25	23–25			61–75	Report
27 Aug	16:30	Greece	0–3	Belgium	14–25	17–25	12–25			43–75	Report
27 Aug	19:00	Slovenia	0–3	Czech Republic	17–25	15–25	20–25			52–75	Report
