= Volleyball at the 2011 Island Games – Women's tournament =

The Women 's tournament of the Volleyball competition at the 2011 Island Games was held from 26 June–1 July 2011 at the Fairway Sports Complex and Rew Valley Sports Centre.

== Participating teams ==
- Åland
- Bermuda
- Faroe Islands
- Gotland
- Gibraltar
- Greenland
- Guernsey
- Hitra Municipality
- Jersey
- Menorca
- Rhodes
- Saare County

== Format ==
The 12 teams were split into two groups of six, the first two of each pool advanced to the semifinals while the third, fourth, fifth and sixth team played placement games.

== Group stage ==
=== Pool A ===
Pos	Team	Pld	W	L	Pts	SW	SL	SR	SPW	SPL	SPR
1	Faroe Islands	5	5	0	10	15	1	15.000	396	253	1.565
2	Åland	5	4	1	9	12	5	2.400	397	324	1.225
3	Bermuda	5	3	2	8	11	6	1.833	396	322	1.230
4	Hitra Municipality	5	2	3	7	7	11	0.636	363	409	0.888
5	Gotland	5	1	4	6	4	12	0.333	281	378	0.743
6	Gibraltar	5	0	5	5	1	15	0.067	251	398	0.631

Date	Time		Score		Set 1	Set 2	Set 3	Set 4	Set 5	Total
26 Jun	08:45	Gotland	3–0	Gibraltar	25–18	25–17	25–18			75–53
26 Jun	13:15	Åland	3–1	Bermuda	13–25	25–16	25–22	25–22		88–85
26 Jun	18:00	Hitra Municipality	0–3	Faroe Islands	7–25	17–25	14–25			38–75
27 Jun	08:45	Gibraltar	0–3	Åland	18–25	14–25	16–25			48–75
27 Jun	13:15	Hitra Municipality	3–1	Gotland	26–24	24–26	25–17	25–22		100–89
27 Jun	18:00	Bermuda	3–0	Gibraltar	25–12	25–18	25–17			75–47
27 Jun	20:15	Faroe Islands	3–0	Åland	25–21	25–21	25–20			75–62
28 Jun	08:45	Bermuda	3–0	Hitra Municipality	25–22	25–12	25–14			75–48
28 Jun	13:15	Gotland	0–3	Faroe Islands	8–25	18–25	11–25			37–75
28 Jun	18:00	Åland	3–1	Hitra Municipality	25–20	25–20	22–25	25–14		97–79
28 Jun	20:15	Bermuda	3–0	Gotland	25–12	25–15	25–16			75–43
29 Jun	08:45	Gibraltar	0–3	Faroe Islands	12–25	9–25	9–25			30–75
29 Jun	13:15	Gotland	0–3	Åland	13–25	12–25	12–25			37–75
29 Jun	18:00	Faroe Islands	3–1	Bermuda	25–23	25–21	21–25	25–17		96–86
30 Jun	08:45	Gibraltar	1–3	Hitra Municipality	25–22	10–25	24–26	14–25		73–98

=== Pool B ===
Pos	Team	Pld	W	L	Pts	SW	SL	SR	SPW	SPL	SPR
1	Saare County	5	5	0	10	15	0	MAX	275	183	1.503
2	Menorca	5	4	1	9	12	4	3.000	361	297	1.215
3	Rhodes	5	3	2	8	10	6	1.667	364	326	1.117
4	Greenland	5	2	3	7	6	10	0.600	309	366	0.844
5	Guernsey	5	1	4	6	3	14	0.214	280	392	0.714
6	Jersey	5	0	5	5	3	15	0.200	300	425	0.706

Date	Time		Score		Set 1	Set 2	Set 3	Set 4	Set 5	Total
26 Jun	08:45	Rhodes	3–0	Guernsey	25–19	25–20	25–10			75–49
26 Jun	13:15	Greenland	0–3	Menorca	14–25	17–25	23–25			54–75
26 Jun	18:00	Jersey	0–3	Saare County	8–25	15–25	13–25			36–75
27 Jun	08:45	Menorca	3–0	Guernsey	25–10	25–16	25–18			75–44
27 Jun	11:00	Saare County	3–0	Greenland	25–6	25–14	25–13			75–33
27 Jun	15:30	Jersey	0–3	Rhodes	17–25	21–25	18–21			56–75
27 Jun	20:15	Guernsey	0–3	Greenland	19–25	17–25	23–25			59–75
28 Jun	08:45	Menorca	3–0	Jersey	25–14	25–12	25–8			75–34
28 Jun	13:15	Rhodes	0–3	Saare County	17–25	18–25	14–25			49–75
28 Jun	15:30	Greenland	3–1	Jersey	22–25	25–13	25–20	26–24		98–82
28 Jun	20:15	Menorca	3–1	Rhodes	21–25	25–21	26–24	25–20		97–90
29 Jun	08:45	Guernsey	0–3	Saare County	11–25	9–25	6–25			26–75
29 Jun	11:00	Rhodes	3–0	Greenland	25–18	25–18	25–13			75–49
29 Jun	15:30	Saare County	3–0	Menorca	25–9	25–19	25–11			75–39
30 Jun	08:45	Guernsey	3–2	Jersey	22–25	25–16	15–25	25–15	15–11	102–92

== Knockout stage ==
=== Bracket ===
Semifinals
June 30
Faroe Islands	3
Menorca	0
June 30
Saare County	3
Åland	0

Gold medal game
July 1
Faroe Islands	2
Saare County	3
Bronze medal game
July 1
Menorca	3
Åland	0

=== Semifinals ===
Date	Time		Score		Set 1	Set 2	Set 3	Set 4	Set 5	Total
30 Jun	15:30	Faroe Islands	3–0	Menorca	25–20	25–23	25–22			75–65
30 Jun	18:00	Saare County	3–0	Åland	25–13	25–23	25–20			75–56

=== Eleventh place game ===
Date	Time		Score		Set 1	Set 2	Set 3	Set 4	Set 5	Total
1 Jul	10:30	Gibraltar	2–3	Jersey	23–25	25–19	23–25	25–17	10–15	106–101

=== Ninth place game ===
Date	Time		Score		Set 1	Set 2	Set 3	Set 4	Set 5	Total
1 Jul	12:15	Gotland	1–3	Guernsey	23–25	21–25	26–24	17–25		87–99

=== Seventh place game ===
Date	Time		Score		Set 1	Set 2	Set 3	Set 4	Set 5	Total
30 Jun	15:30	Hitra Municipality	3–2	Greenland	25–18	18–25	25–22	17–25	15–11	100–101

=== Fifth place game ===
Date	Time		Score		Set 1	Set 2	Set 3	Set 4	Set 5	Total
30 Jun	13:15	Rhodes	2–3	Bermuda	25–22	21–25	25–20	16–25	19–21	106–113

=== Bronze medal game ===
Date	Time		Score		Set 1	Set 2	Set 3	Set 4	Set 5	Total
1 Jul	08:45	Menorca	3–0	Åland	25–14	25–22	25–23			75–59

=== Gold medal game ===
Date	Time		Score		Set 1	Set 2	Set 3	Set 4	Set 5	Total
1 Jul	12:15	Faroe Islands	2–3	Saare County	25–20	15–25	25–17	10–25	12–15	87–102
