= Ofelia Malinov =

Italian volleyball player (born 1996)

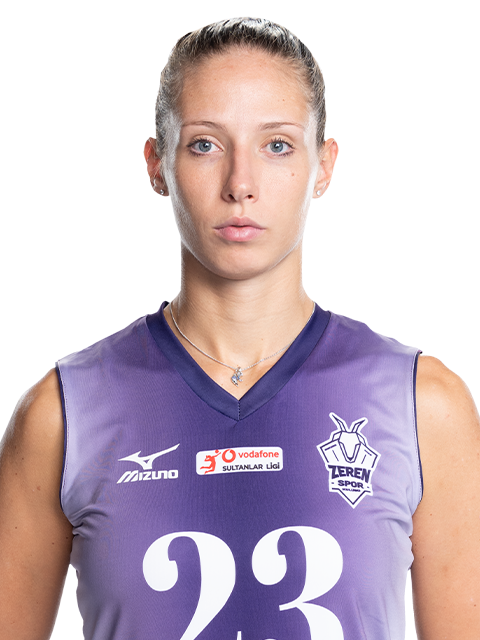
- Malinov with Zeren SK in 2024

Personal information
- Nationality: Italian
- Born: 29 February 1996 (age 30); Bergamo, Italy
- Height: 184 cm (6 ft 0 in)
- Weight: 67 kg (148 lb)
- Spike: 306 cm (120 in)
- Block: 286 cm (113 in)

Volleyball information
- Position: Setter
- Current club: Zeren

Career
Years	Teams
2015-2016	Club Italia
2016-2017	Imoco Volley
2017	Volley Bergamo
2018-	Pallavolo Scandicci

National team
2015-	Italy
Honours
Representing Italy
FIVB World Championship
Silver medal – second place	2018 Japan	Team
Bronze medal – third place	2022 Poland/Netherlands	Team
FIVB Nations League
Gold medal – first place	2022 Ankara	Team
European Championship
Gold medal – first place	2021 Serbia/Bulgaria/Croatia/Romania	Team
Bronze medal – third place	2019 Turkey	Team
FIVB World Grand Prix
Silver medal – second place	2017 Nanjing	Team
Montreux Volley Masters
Bronze medal – third place	2019 Montreux	Team

Ofelia Malinov (Bulgarian: Офелия Малинов; born 29 February 1996) is an Italian volleyball player, playing as a setter.

She is part of the Italy women's national volleyball team. She was born in Italy to Bulgarian parents (her father was a coach in the sport).

== Career ==
She competed at the 2020 Summer Olympics, 2015 Women's European Volleyball Championship, 2016 FIVB Volleyball World Grand Prix, 2017 FIVB Volleyball World Grand Prix, and 2019 Montreux Volley Masters.

She was selected to play the Italian League All-Star game in 2017.

== Awards ==
=== Clubs ===
- 2016 Italian Supercup – Champions, with Imoco Volley Conegliano
- 2016–17 Italian Cup (Coppa Italia) – Champions, with Imoco Volley Conegliano
- 2016–17 CEV Champions League – Runner-Up, with Imoco Volley Conegliano

=== Individuals ===
- 2018 FIVB World Championship "Best Setter"

Awards
Preceded by (United States) Alisha Glass	Best Setter of World Championship; 2018	Succeeded by (Serbia) Bojana Drča
