= 2018 FIVB Women's Volleyball World Championship qualification (CSV) =

The CSV qualification for the 2018 FIVB Women's Volleyball World Championship saw its member nations compete for two places at the finals in Japan. The winners of the 2017 Women's South American Volleyball Championship, plus the winners of the qualification tournament, qualified for the 2018 World Championship.

== 2017 South American Championship ==
- Venue: Coliseo Evangelista Mora, Cali, Colombia
- Dates: 15–19 August 2017
- The champions qualified for the 2018 World Championship.

Rank	Team
1st place, gold medalist(s)	Brazil
2nd place, silver medalist(s)	Colombia
3rd place, bronze medalist(s)	Peru
4	Argentina
5	Venezuela
6	Chile

Qualified for the 2018 World Championship

== Qualification tournament ==
- Venue: Coliseo Arequipa, Arequipa, Peru
- Dates: 13-15 October 2017
- All times are Peru Time (UTC−05:00).
- The winners will qualify for the 2018 World Championship.

Pos	Team	Pld	W	L	Pts	SW	SL	SR	SPW	SPL	SPR	Qualification
1	Argentina	3	3	0	9	9	1	9.000	243	180	1.350	2018 World Championship
2	Colombia	3	2	1	6	6	3	2.000	209	170	1.229	
3	Peru	3	1	2	3	4	6	0.667	222	220	1.009	
4	Uruguay	3	0	3	0	0	9	0.000	120	225	0.533	

Date	Time		Score		Set 1	Set 2	Set 3	Set 4	Set 5	Total	Report
13 Oct	17:00	Argentina	3–0	Colombia	25–21	25–19	25–19			75–59	
13 Oct	19:00	Peru	3–0	Uruguay	25–14	25–23	25–15			75–52	
14 Oct	17:00	Argentina	3–0	Uruguay	25–12	25–14	25–11			75–37	
14 Oct	19:00	Peru	0–3	Colombia	23–25	21–25	20–25			64–75	
15 Oct	16:00	Colombia	3–0	Uruguay	25–10	25–10	25–11			75–31	
15 Oct	18:00	Peru	1–3	Argentina	22–25	20–25	25–18	16–25		83–93	
