= Northern Ireland women's national volleyball team =

Women's national volleyball team representing Northern Ireland

Northern Ireland
- Association: Northern Ireland Volleyball
- Confederation: CEV
- FIVB ranking: 78 ▼14 (1 May 2026)

Uniforms
Home	Away

The Northern Ireland women's national volleyball team represents Northern Ireland in international women's volleyball competitions and friendly matches, The Team Ruled and managed by the Northern Irish Volleyball Federation that is a part of the Federation of International Volleyball (FIVB) as well as the European Volleyball Confederation (CEV), The Northern Ireland Team also follow the Small Countries Association (SCA). The Northern Irish had never manage to make any major international tournaments debut like the FIVB World Championship or the CEV European Championship they often compete in the qualifiers for these tournaments, as well they participate in regional competitions for small countries like the Small Countries Division Championship and the Games of the Small States of Europe.

The governing body for the NI women's volleyball team is called Northern Ireland Volleyball Association (as well as the Northern Ireland men's national volleyball team).

== History ==
In 1970, a group of enthusiasts formed the Northern Ireland volleyball association (NIVA). Since 1982, the association has been a member of the FIVB and the CEV. For the first time the Northern Ireland women's national team was formed in 1983 to participate in the traditional Spring Cup tournament, which had been held since 1962 for men and (for women – since 1973) on the initiative of volleyball federations from Western European countries. The debut for the Northern Irish team was unsuccessful, they finished in the 12th place among 12 teams. From 1986 to 1991, the British Isles Volleyball Championship was held, and the Northern Ireland team was a regular participant in this tournament. Their best result so far was the 2nd place, taken in 1989. The debut of the Northern Ireland women's national team in official international tournaments under the auspices of the FIVB and CEV took place only in May 2013, when the Northern Irish first entered the World Championship qualifying tournament. In their qualifying group in Kortrijk, Belgium, the team lost to all three of their opponents with the same score of 0:3, and in the games against Switzerland and Belgium they failed to score more than 10 points in any of the games, and the second set against the Swiss team ended with the result of 2:25 (!). The ratio of games was slightly better only in the match against the Portuguese national team. Such a disappointing result did not discourage the leadership of the national association, and a year later the Northern Ireland national team for the first time took part in the qualifying tournament of the European Small Nations Championship. In the opening match of their qualifying group Northern Ireland achieved their first victory, defeating their southern neighbors – the national team of Ireland . In the other four matches the Northern Irish were defeated by the national teams of Scotland, Malta and Cyprus, failing in any of the sets of these matches to overcome the 15 points. The Northern Ireland national team performance was poor in the qualification of the 2017 European Small Nations Championship, which was held in June 2016 in Luxembourg. This stage of the championship was also the first round of qualifying for the 2018 World Championship. In all three matches played against the teams of Luxembourg, Scotland and Iceland, the Northern Irish suffered a heavy defeats, with the 2nd set of the match with the Scots it was lost with a score of 04:25, and in the match against the Icelandic national team the total scores was only 27 points.
