= 2018 FIVB Women's Volleyball World Championship qualification (AVC) =

The Asian section of the 2018 FIVB Women's Volleyball World Championship qualification acts as qualifiers for the 2018 FIVB Women's Volleyball World Championship, to be held in Japan, for national teams which are members of the Asian Volleyball Confederation (AVC). A total of 4+1 slots (4 direct slots and 1 host slot) in the final tournament are available for AVC teams.

== Pools composition ==
15 AVC national teams entered qualification.

=== First round ===
There are three confederation zonal competitions. The winner of each competition competed in second round. Because Macau, New Zealand and Tonga later withdrew, North Korea and Fiji automatically qualified for the second round.

Central Asia	Eastern Asia	Oceania
Iran	~~Macau~~	Fiji
Maldives	North Korea	~~New Zealand~~
Nepal		~~Tonga~~

=== Second round ===
The top seven ranked teams from FIVB World Ranking as of 1 January 2015 qualified automatically for this round. The top six ranked teams seeded by the serpentine system. The other four teams were drawn.

Pool A	Pool B
China	South Korea
Kazakhstan	Thailand
Chinese Taipei	Vietnam
Australia	Iran
Fiji	North Korea

== First round ==
- The winners in each zone will qualify for the second round.

=== Central Asia ===
- Venue: Indoor Hall of Youth Centre, Malé, Maldives
- Dates: 27–29 January 2017
- All times are Maldives Time (UTC+05:00)
- India was initially chosen as the host country for the event. However, due to internal problems with the Volleyball Federation of India, the Asian Volleyball Confederation decided to shift the competition venue from India to Male in the Maldives. The AVC informed all the participating teams in the tournament that if they wanted to compete in the event, they had to reconfirm their participation to the AVC and the Volleyball Association of Maldives by December 31. Maldives, Nepal, and Iran confirmed their participation and played in Malé January 27-29, 2017.

Pos	Team	Pld	W	L	Pts	SW	SL	SR	SPW	SPL	SPR	Qualification
1	Iran	2	2	0	6	6	0	MAX	150	67	2.239	Second round
2	Nepal	2	1	1	3	3	3	1.000	111	122	0.910	
3	Maldives	2	0	2	0	0	6	0.000	78	150	0.520	

Date	Time		Score		Set 1	Set 2	Set 3	Set 4	Set 5	Total	Report
27 Jan	16:45	Maldives	0–3	Nepal	17–25	17–25	13–25			47–75	
28 Jan	16:45	Nepal	0–3	Iran	12–25	12–25	12–25			36–75	
29 Jan	16:45	Maldives	0–3	Iran	4–25	12–25	15–25			31–75	

== Second round ==
- The winners and runners-up in each pool will qualify for the 2018 World Championship.

=== Pool A ===
- Venue: Baluan Sholak Sports Palace, Almaty, Kazakhstan
- Dates: 20–24 September 2017
- All times are Kazakhstan Standard Time (UTC+06:00).

Pos	Team	Pld	W	L	Pts	SW	SL	SR	SPW	SPL	SPR	Qualification
1	China	4	4	0	12	12	0	MAX	300	160	1.875	2018 World Championship
2	Kazakhstan	4	3	1	9	9	5	1.800	314	250	1.256	2018 World Championship
3	Chinese Taipei	4	2	2	6	7	6	1.167	271	244	1.111	
4	Australia	4	1	3	3	4	9	0.444	215	291	0.739	
5	Fiji	4	0	4	0	0	12	0.000	145	300	0.483	

Date	Time		Score		Set 1	Set 2	Set 3	Set 4	Set 5	Total	Report
20 Sep	16:00	China	3–0	Fiji	25–5	25–10	25–14			75–29	Report
20 Sep	19:00	Australia	0–3	Chinese Taipei	23–25	13–25	8–25			44–75	Report
21 Sep	16:00	Fiji	0–3	Australia	18–25	16–25	10–25			44–75	Report
21 Sep	19:00	Kazakhstan	0–3	China	14–25	19–25	15–25			48–75	Report
22 Sep	16:00	Chinese Taipei	3–0	Fiji	25–9	25–12	25–10			75–31	Report
22 Sep	19:00	Australia	1–3	Kazakhstan	15–25	6–25	25–22	9–25		55–97	Report
23 Sep	16:00	China	3–0	Australia	25–15	25–6	25–20			75–41	Report
23 Sep	19:00	Kazakhstan	3–1	Chinese Taipei	25–15	19–25	25–19	25–20		94–79	Report
24 Sep	16:00	Chinese Taipei	0–3	China	18–25	14–25	10–25			42–75	Report
24 Sep	19:00	Fiji	0–3	Kazakhstan	8–25	19–25	14–25			41–75	Report

=== Pool B ===
- Venue: Nakhon Pathom Sports Center Gymnasium, Nakhon Pathom, Thailand
- Dates: 20–24 September 2017
- All times are Thailand Standard Time (UTC+07:00).

Pos	Team	Pld	W	L	Pts	SW	SL	SR	SPW	SPL	SPR	Qualification
1	South Korea	4	4	0	12	12	0	MAX	300	222	1.351	2018 World Championship
2	Thailand	4	3	1	9	9	3	3.000	284	229	1.240	2018 World Championship
3	North Korea	4	2	2	6	6	6	1.000	270	265	1.019	
4	Vietnam	4	1	3	3	3	10	0.300	264	309	0.854	
5	Iran	4	0	4	0	1	12	0.083	232	325	0.714	

Date	Time		Score		Set 1	Set 2	Set 3	Set 4	Set 5	Total	Report
20 Sep	15:30	North Korea	0–3	South Korea	17–25	23–25	19–25			59–75	Report
20 Sep	18:15	Thailand	3–0	Iran	25–14	25–15	25–13			75–42	Report
21 Sep	15:30	Iran	0–3	North Korea	23–25	11–25	18–25			52–75	Report
21 Sep	18:15	Thailand	3–0	Vietnam	25–17	25–17	25–17			75–51	Report
22 Sep	15:30	Vietnam	0–3	North Korea	21–25	22–25	20–25			63–75	Report
22 Sep	18:15	South Korea	3–0	Iran	25–16	25–18	25–20			75–54	Report
23 Sep	15:30	Vietnam	0–3	South Korea	21–25	13–25	16–25			50–75	Report
23 Sep	18:15	Thailand	3–0	North Korea	25–21	25–21	25–19			75–61	Report
24 Sep	15:30	Vietnam	3–1	Iran	24–26	25–22	25–17	25–19		99–84	Report
24 Sep	18:15	Thailand	0–3	South Korea	22–25	16–25	21–25			59–75	Report
