= Bojana Drča =

Serbian retired professional volleyball player (born 1988)

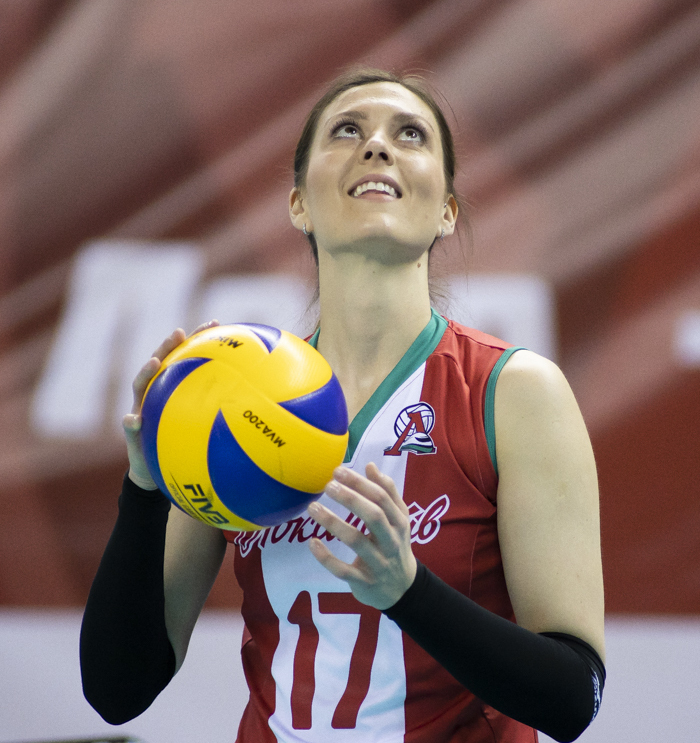
- Bojana in 2019

Personal information
- Nationality: Serbian
- Born: Bojana Živković; 29 March 1988 (age 38); Belgrade, SR Serbia, SFR Yugoslavia
- Height: 1.86 m (6 ft 1 in)
- Weight: 72 kg (159 lb)
- Spike: 300 cm (118 in)
- Block: 292 cm (115 in)

Volleyball information
- Position: Setter

Career
Years	Teams
2005–2006; 2006–2011; 2011–2012; 2012–2013; 2013–2015; 2015–2018; 2018; 2018–2019; 2021–2022; 2022–2023; 2023–2025	Postar 064 Belgrade; OK Crvena zvezda Belgrade; Voléro Zürich; Omichka Omsk; İlbank Ankara; Voléro Zürich; Le Cannet; Lokomotiv Kaliningrad; OK Crvena zvezda Belgrade; Leningradka Saint Petersburg; Fenerbahce S.K.

National team
Serbia
Honours
Women's volleyball
Representing Serbia
Olympic Games
Silver medal – second place	2016 Rio de Janeiro	Team
World Championship
Gold medal – first place	2018 Japan	Team
Gold medal – first place	2022 Netherlands/Poland	Team
European Championship
Gold medal – first place	2017 Azerbaijan/Georgia
Silver medal – second place	2023 Belgium/Estonia/Germany/Italy
Bronze medal – third place	2015 Netherlands/Belgium
FIVB World Cup
Silver medal – second place	2015 Japan
FIVB Nations League
Bronze medal – third place	2022 Ankara	Team
FIVB World Grand Prix
Bronze medal – third place	2013 Sapporo	Team
Bronze medal – third place	2017 Nanjing	Team
European Games
Bronze medal – third place	2015 Baku	Team
European League
Gold medal – first place	2009 Kayseri
Gold medal – first place	2010 Ankara
Gold medal – first place	2011 Istanbul
Bronze medal – third place	2012 Karlovy Vary

Bojana Drča (née Živković, born 29 March 1988) is a Serbian retired professional volleyball player who played as a setter. She was a long-time member of the Serbia women's national volleyball team, representing the country at the 2012 Summer Olympics and winning a silver medal at the 2016 Olympics. As a core player during Serbia's dominant era, she won gold medals at the 2018 World Championship, the 2022 World Championship, and the 2017 European Championship.

== Awards ==
=== National team ===
==== Senior team ====
- 2013 World Grand Prix – Bronze Medal
- 2015 World Cup – Silver Medal
- 2015 European Championship – Bronze Medal
- 2016 Olympic Games – Silver Medal
- 2017 World Grand Prix – Bronze Medal
- 2017 European Championship – Gold Medal
- 2018 World Championship – Gold Medal
- 2022 FIVB Nations League – Bronze Medal
- 2022 World Championship – Gold Medal
- 2023 European Championship – Silver Medal

=== Clubs ===
- 2017 Club World Championship – Bronze medal, with Voléro Zürich
- 2023–24 CEV Champions League – Bronze medal, with Fenerbahçe Opet
- 2023–24 Turkish Volleyball League – Champion, with Fenerbahçe Opet
- 2023–24 Turkish Volleyball Cup – Champion, with Fenerbahçe Opet
- 2024 Turkish Super Cup Champion, with Fenerbahçe Medicana
- 2024–25 Turkish Volleyball Cup – Champion, with Fenerbahçe Medicana

=== Individual ===
- 2007–08 CEV Cup Final Four "Best Blocker"
- 2009–10 CEV Cup Final Four "Best Setter"
- 2017 Yeltsin Cup "Best Setter"
- 2022 World Championship "Best Setter"
- 2023–24 Turkish Volleyball League "Best Setter"

Awards
Preceded by (Italy) Ofelia Malinov	Best Setter of FIVB World Championship; 2022	Succeeded by Incumbent
