= Gibraltar women's national volleyball team =

Women's national volleyball team representing Gibraltar

Gibraltar
- Association: Gibraltar Volleyball Association
- Confederation: CEV
- FIVB ranking: NR (29 June 2025)

Uniforms
Home	Away

The Gibraltar women's national volleyball team represents Gibraltar in international women's volleyball competitions and friendly matches, The Team Ruled and managed by the Gibraltar Volleyball Association that is a part of the Federation of International Volleyball (FIVB) as well as the European Volleyball Confederation (CEV), The Gibraltar Team also follow the Small Countries Association (SCA). The Gibraltarians have never qualified to any major international tournaments like the FIVB World Championship or the CEV European Championship in contrast they often participate in the qualifiers for these tournaments as well they participate in regional competitions for small countries like the Small Countries Division Championship and the Island Games.

== History ==
The Gibraltar Volleyball Association has been a member of the FIVB and the CEV since 1984. The Gibraltar women's volleyball team made its international debut in September 1987 at the Island Games held in Guernsey. The Gibraltarian finished 2nd in their preliminary group, and lost to the Aland Islands team for the bronze medal match. Later the Gibraltar team participated in most of the volleyball tournaments of these multi-sport competitions, but did not manage to win any medal. In addition, the Gibraltar team twice participated in the European Small Countries Championships. In 1992, the tournament was held in Gibraltar, where the home team won silver medal. At the preliminary stage of the tournament Gibraltar defeated the teams of Luxembourg and San Marino, in the semifinals the team of Cyprus, and in the final they lost to San Marino. In 2006, the Gibraltarian hosted one of the group stages of the European Championship qualifying tournament (Small Countries Division) Zone, but they were defeated by the teams of Liechtenstein and Luxembourg, losing both matches with a score of 0:3 and failing to score more than 11 points in any of the 6 sets played. After a disappointing performance at the 2011 Island Games, where the Gibraltar volleyball team finished in 12th place, the Gibraltar national team did not participate in international competitions for 6 years. In June 2017, the Gibraltar team was once again among the participants in the volleyball tournament of the Island Games held on the Swedish island of Gotland. After suffering 4 defeats in four matches in their preliminary stage group, the Gibraltarians managed to beat the Guernsey national team 3:0 in their last match for the 9th place. It is interesting that the position of the central blocker of the Gibraltar national team for many seasons is played by the president of the national volleyball association Emma Labrador.
