= Greenland women's national volleyball team =

Women's national volleyball team representing Greenland

Greenland
- Association: Greenland Volleyball Federation
- Confederation: CEV
- FIVB ranking: NR (24 May 2026)

Uniforms
Home	Away

The Greenland women's national volleyball team (Greenlandic : Arnat nunanut allanut unammisartut, Danish : Grønlandsk damelandsholdet volleyball) represents Greenland in international women's volleyball competitions and friendly matches, The Team Ruled and managed by the Greenlandic Volleyball Association that is a part of the Federation of International Volleyball (FIVB) as well as the European Volleyball Confederation (CEV), The Greenlandic Team also follow two regional European Volleyball bodies which are the North European Volleyball Zonal Association (NEVZA) and the Small Countries Association (SCA).

== Team history ==
The Greenlandic women's national volleyball team has never in its history Qualified to any major international volleyball Events like the FIVB Volleyball Women's World Championship, Olympic Games, European Championship they Participate in Regional competitions like Small Countries Division Championship their best results in this Tournament was the 6th place in the 2019 Edition, they also have two bronze medal in the Games of the Small States of Europe in 2003 and 2013.
