= 2017 Women's NORCECA Volleyball Championship =

2017 Women's NORCECA Championship
Tournament details
- Host country: Various
- Dates: 26 September – 16 October
- Teams: 12
- Venues: 3 (in 3 host cities)

The 2017 Women's NORCECA Volleyball Championship was the 25th edition of the tournament, and played from 26 September to 16 October 2017 in Canada, Dominican Republic, and Trinidad and Tobago. The top two teams of each pools qualified for 2018 World Championship.

== Qualification ==
The top six teams from NORCECA ranking qualified directly, except United States, the reigning World champion. Other six teams will qualify though the zonal qualification.

Direct Qualification		Zonal Qualification	
NORCECA Ranking	Dominican Republic	CAZOVA	Trinidad and Tobago
NORCECA Ranking	Puerto Rico	CAZOVA	Jamaica
NORCECA Ranking	Cuba	ECVA	Saint Lucia
NORCECA Ranking	Canada	ECVA	Dominica
NORCECA Ranking	Mexico	AFECAVOL	Nicaragua
NORCECA Ranking	Costa Rica	AFECAVOL	Guatemala

== Pools composition ==
Pool A	Pool B	Pool C
Dominican Republic	Canada	Trinidad and Tobago
Puerto Rico	Cuba	Mexico
Guatemala	Nicaragua	Costa Rica
Jamaica	Saint Lucia	Dominica

== Competition ==
=== Pool A ===
- Venue: Santo Domingo, Dominican Republic
- Date: 13–15 October 2017

Pos	Team	Pld	W	L	Pts	SPW	SPL	SPR	SW	SL	SR	Qualification
1	Dominican Republic	3	3	0	15	226	116	1.948	9	0	MAX	2018 World Championship
2	Puerto Rico	3	2	1	10	210	151	1.391	6	3	2.000	2018 World Championship
3	Guatemala	3	1	2	5	140	212	0.660	3	6	0.500	
4	Jamaica	3	0	3	0	128	225	0.569	0	9	0.000	

Date	Time		Score		Set 1	Set 2	Set 3	Set 4	Set 5	Total	Report
13 Oct	17:00	Puerto Rico	3–0	Jamaica	25–8	25–10	25–17			75–35	P2 P3
13 Oct	19:00	Dominican Republic	3–0	Guatemala	25–7	25–7	25–11			75–25	P2 P3
14 Oct	17:00	Guatemala	0–3	Puerto Rico	11–25	16–25	13–25			40–75	P2 P3
14 Oct	19:00	Jamaica	0–3	Dominican Republic	14–25	11–25	6–25			31–75	P2 P3
15 Oct	17:00	Guatemala	3–0	Jamaica	25–23	25–19	25–20			75–62	P2 P3
15 Oct	19:00	Dominican Republic	3–0	Puerto Rico	26–24	25–21	25–15			76–60	P2 P3

=== Pool B ===
- Venue: Vancouver, Canada
- Date: 28–30 September 2017

Pos	Team	Pld	W	L	Pts	SPW	SPL	SPR	SW	SL	SR	Qualification
1	Canada	3	3	0	15	225	111	2.027	9	0	MAX	2018 World Championship
2	Cuba	3	2	1	10	206	135	1.526	6	3	2.000	2018 World Championship
3	Nicaragua	3	1	2	5	142	186	0.763	3	6	0.500	
4	Saint Lucia	3	0	3	0	84	225	0.373	0	9	0.000	

Date	Time		Score		Set 1	Set 2	Set 3	Set 4	Set 5	Total	Report
28 Sep	17:30	Cuba	3–0	Nicaragua	25–8	25–9	25–19			75–36	P2 P3
28 Sep	20:00	Canada	3–0	Saint Lucia	25–8	25–8	25–8			75–24	P2 P3
29 Sep	17:30	Cuba	3–0	Saint Lucia	25–6	25–6	25–12			75–24	P2 P3
29 Sep	20:00	Canada	3–0	Nicaragua	25–13	25–10	25–8			75–31	P2 P3
30 Sep	17:30	Saint Lucia	0–3	Nicaragua	12–25	11–25	13–25			36–75	P2 P3
30 Sep	20:00	Canada	3–0	Cuba	25–18	25–15	25–23			75–56	P2 P3

=== Pool C ===
- Venue: Port of Spain, Trinidad and Tobago
- Date: 13–15 October 2017

Pos	Team	Pld	W	L	Pts	SPW	SPL	SPR	SW	SL	SR	Qualification
1	Mexico	3	3	0	13	260	184	1.413	9	2	4.500	2018 World Championship
2	Trinidad and Tobago	3	2	1	12	252	199	1.266	8	3	2.667	2018 World Championship
3	Costa Rica	3	1	2	5	187	190	0.984	3	6	0.500	
4	Dominica	3	0	3	0	99	225	0.440	0	9	0.000	

Date	Time		Score		Set 1	Set 2	Set 3	Set 4	Set 5	Total	Report
13 Oct	17:00	Mexico	3–0	Costa Rica	25–16	25–18	25–21			75–55	P2 P3
13 Oct	19:00	Trinidad and Tobago	3–0	Dominica	25–16	25–7	25–9			75–32	P2 P3
14 Oct	17:00	Dominica	0–3	Mexico	7–25	13–25	7–25			27–75	P2 P3
14 Oct	19:00	Costa Rica	0–3	Trinidad and Tobago	19–25	16–25	22–25			57–75	P2 P3
15 Oct	17:00	Dominica	0–3	Costa Rica	14–25	13–25	13–25			40–75	P2 P3
15 Oct	19:00	Trinidad and Tobago	2–3	Mexico	21–25	22–25	25–23	25–22	9–15	102–110	P2 P3
