= 2018 FIVB Women's Volleyball World Championship =

2018 FIVB Women's World Championship
バレーボール女子世界選手権 日本 2018

Tournament details
- Host country: Japan
- Cities: Hamamatsu, Kobe, Nagoya, Sapporo, Yokohama and Osaka
- Dates: 29 September – 20 October
- Teams: 24
- Venues: 6 (in 6 host cities)
- Officially opened by: Akihito

Final positions
- Champions: Serbia (1st title)
- Runners-up: Italy
- Third place: China
- Fourth place: Netherlands

Tournament awards
- MVP: Tijana Bošković
- Best Setter: Ofelia Malinov
- Best OH: Miriam Sylla; Zhu Ting
- Best MB: Yan Ni; Milena Rašić
- Best OPP: Paola Egonu
- Best Libero: Monica De Gennaro

Tournament statistics
- Matches played: 103
- Attendance: 224,415 (2,179 per match)
- Best scorer: Paola Egonu (324 points)
- Best spiker: Tijana Bošković (53.66%)
- Best blocker: Yan Ni (0.89 Avg)
- Best server: Lonneke Slöetjes (0.56 Avg)
- Best setter: Ofelia Malinov (4.00 Avg)
- Best digger: Silvija Popović (3.23 Avg)
- Best receiver: Mako Kobata (46.25%)

The 2018 FIVB Women's World Championship was the eighteenth edition of the event, contested by the senior women's national teams of the members of the Fédération Internationale de Volleyball (FIVB), the sport's global governing body. The final tournament was held in Japan from 29 September to 20 October 2018. The final four was held at the Yokohama Arena in Yokohama.

Serbia won their first world title, defeating Italy in five sets at the final. This was the first all-European final in the Women's World Championship history and the first final since 1990 that not featured a team from the Americas. Reigning olympic champions China won the third place match, defeating Netherlands in straight sets. For the first time since the 1974 Championship in Mexico, no team from the Americas reached the final four. Tijana Bošković from Serbia was elected the MVP.

== Host selection ==
On 25 August 2014, FIVB announced that the tournament would be held in Japan for the third time in twelve years and the fifth time overall. The tournament will take place in six cities: Hamamatsu, Kobe, Nagoya, Osaka, Sapporo, and Yokohama.

Japan hosted the Women's World Championship on four previous occasions: 1967, 1998, 2006, and 2010. Moreover, Japan also hosted the Men's World Championship in 1998 and 2006. The country has also played hosts to other important volleyball competitions, including the Asian Women's Volleyball Championship and the World Grand Prix final round.

== Qualification ==
Qualified Failed to qualify / Withdrew Suspended

The qualification process was a series of tournaments organised by the five FIVB confederations to decide 22 of the 24 teams which would play in the final tournament, with Japan qualifying automatically as hosts and United States also qualifying automatically as the defending champions. All remaining FIVB member associations were eligible to enter the qualifying process.

At first, 160 associations registered teams to compete in the qualification process, but 46 associations withdrew from the qualifying process after they registered and India were suspended and then expelled from taking part in the process as a punishment for internal problems in the India Volleyball Federation.

The five regional governing bodies were allocated the remaining 22 spots; CAVB (Africa) was granted two, AVC (Asia and Oceania) four, NORCECA (North America) six, CSV (South America) two, and CEV (Europe) eight spots.

Of the 24 nations qualified to play at the 2018 World Championship, 21 countries competed at the previous tournament in 2014. Trinidad and Tobago qualified for the first time. Other teams returning after absences of the last tournament(s) include Kenya and South Korea, who both missed the 2014 edition.

Country	Confederation	Qualified as	Qualified on	Previous appearances		
Country	Confederation	Qualified as	Qualified on	Total	First	Last
Japan	AVC	Host Country	25 August 2014	15	1960	2014
United States	NORCECA	Defending Champions	12 October 2014	15	1956	2014
Serbia^{1}	CEV	CEV Second Round Pool B Winners	28 May 2017	4	1978	2014
Russia^{2}	CEV	CEV Second Round Pool A Winners	3 June 2017	16	1952	2014
Azerbaijan	CEV	CEV Second Round Pool E Winners	3 June 2017	3	1994	2014
Turkey	CEV	CEV Second Round Pool C Winners	4 June 2017	3	2006	2014
Italy	CEV	CEV Second Round Pool D Winners	4 June 2017	10	1978	2014
Germany^{3}	CEV	CEV Second Round Pool F Winners	4 June 2017	15	1956	2014
Brazil	CSV	CSV Championship Winners	19 August 2017	15	1956	2014
Netherlands	CEV	CEV Third Round Pool G Winners	26 August 2017	13	1956	2014
Bulgaria	CEV	CEV Third Round Pool G Runners-up	26 August 2017	11	1952	2014
China	AVC	AVC Second Round Pool A Winners	23 September 2017	13	1956	2014
South Korea	AVC	AVC Second Round Pool B Winners	23 September 2017	11	1967	2010
Thailand	AVC	AVC Second Round Pool B Runners-up	23 September 2017	4	1998	2014
Kazakhstan	AVC	AVC Second Round Pool A Runners-up	24 September 2017	3	2006	2014
Canada	NORCECA	NORCECA Championship Pool B Winners	29 September 2017	8	1974	2014
Cuba	NORCECA	NORCECA Championship Pool B Runners-up	29 September 2017	12	1970	2014
Cameroon	CAVB	CAVB Championship Winners	13 October 2017	2	2006	2014
Kenya	CAVB	CAVB Championship Runners-up	13 October 2017	5	1994	2010
Dominican Republic	NORCECA	NORCECA Championship Pool A Winners	14 October 2017	7	1974	2014
Mexico	NORCECA	NORCECA Championship Pool C Winners	14 October 2017	7	1970	2014
Puerto Rico	NORCECA	NORCECA Championship Pool A Runners-up	14 October 2017	6	1974	2014
Trinidad and Tobago	NORCECA	NORCECA Championship Pool C Runners-up	14 October 2017	0	–	–
Argentina	CSV	CSV Qualifier Winners	15 October 2017	5	1960	2014

Notes
^{1} Competed as SFR Yugoslavia in 1978 and as Serbia and Montenegro (FR Yugoslavia) in 2006; 3rd appearance as Serbia.
^{2} Competed as Soviet Union from 1952 to 1990; 7th appearance as Russia.
^{3} Competed separately as East and West Germany from 1956 to 1990; 7th appearance as Unified Germany.

== Venues ==
Pool A, Final round	Pool B	Pool C	2018 FIVB Women's Volleyball World Championship is located in Japan
Yokohama	Sapporo	Kobe	2018 FIVB Women's Volleyball World Championship is located in Japan
Yokohama Arena	Hokkaido Prefectural Sports Center	Kobe Green Arena	2018 FIVB Women's Volleyball World Championship is located in Japan
Capacity: 12,000	Capacity: 8,000	Capacity: 6,000	2018 FIVB Women's Volleyball World Championship is located in Japan
Pool D	Pool E, G, H	Pool F	2018 FIVB Women's Volleyball World Championship is located in Japan
Hamamatsu	Nagoya	Osaka	2018 FIVB Women's Volleyball World Championship is located in Japan
Hamamatsu Arena	Nippon Gaishi Hall	Osaka Municipal Central Gymnasium	2018 FIVB Women's Volleyball World Championship is located in Japan
Capacity: 8,200	Capacity: 10,000	Capacity: 8,000	2018 FIVB Women's Volleyball World Championship is located in Japan

== Format ==
First round

In the first round, the 24 teams are spread across four pools of six teams playing in a round-robin system. The top four teams from each pool advance to the second round.

Second round

In the second round, the 16 teams are allocated in two pools of eight teams (top teams from first round pools A and D in one and top teams from pools B and C in the other). Once again a round-robin system is used in each pool, teams coming from the same first round pool (therefore already played each other) only play against opponents from a different first round pool. The second round standings takes into account the points scored by each team in the first and second rounds. The top three teams of each group will access the third round.

Third round

The six teams competing in the third round are divided into two three-team pools by a draw, with the first place teams from the previous round securing the head position of both pools. After the matches played once again in a round-robin system, the top two in each pool qualify for the semifinals and finals while the third placed teams from each pool play a fifth place match.

Final round

The third round pool winners play against the runners-up in this round. The semifinals winners advance to compete for the World Championship title. The losers face each other in the third place match.

== Pools composition ==
=== First round ===
Teams were seeded in the first two positions of each pool following the Serpentine system according to their FIVB World Ranking as of 7 August 2017. FIVB reserved the right to seed the hosts as heads of pool A regardless of the World Ranking. All teams not seeded were drawn to take other available positions in the remaining lines following the World Ranking. Each pool had no more than three teams from the same confederation. The draw was held in Tokyo, Japan on 7 December 2017. Rankings as of 7 August 2017 are shown in brackets, except the hosts Japan who ranked sixth.

Seeded Teams
Pool A	Pool B	Pool C	Pool D
Japan (Host); Netherlands (8)	China (1); Italy (7)	United States (2); Russia (5)	Serbia (3); Brazil (4)
Unseeded Teams
Pot 1	Pot 2	Pot 3	Pot 4
Dominican Republic (9); South Korea (10); Argentina (11); Turkey (12)	Germany (13); Puerto Rico (15); Thailand (16); Bulgaria (17)	Cameroon (18); Canada (19); Kazakhstan (21); Azerbaijan (24)	Cuba (25); Mexico (26); Kenya (33); Trinidad and Tobago (34)

Draw

Pool A	Pool B	Pool C	Pool D
Japan	China	United States	Serbia
Netherlands	Italy	Russia	Brazil
Argentina	Turkey	South Korea	Dominican Republic
Germany	Bulgaria	Thailand	Puerto Rico
Cameroon	Canada	Azerbaijan	Kazakhstan
Mexico	Cuba	Trinidad and Tobago	Kenya

=== Second round ===
Pool E
Netherlands (Pool A 1st)	Serbia (Pool D 1st)
Japan (Pool A 2nd)	Brazil (Pool D 2nd)
Germany (Pool A 3rd)	Dominican Republic (Pool D 3rd)
Mexico (Pool A 4th)	Puerto Rico (Pool D 4th)

Pool F
Italy (Pool B 1st)	United States (Pool C 1st)
China (Pool B 2nd)	Russia (Pool C 2nd)
Turkey (Pool B 3rd)	Thailand (Pool C 3rd)
Bulgaria (Pool B 4th)	Azerbaijan (Pool C 4th)

=== Third round ===
Third round draw took place at Nippon Gaishi Hall, Nagoya on 11 October 2018.

Pool G	Pool H
Italy (Pool F 1st)	Netherlands (Pool E 1st)
Japan (Pool E 2nd)	China (Pool F 2nd)
Serbia (Pool E 3rd)	United States (Pool F 3rd)

== Pool standing procedure ==
1. Total number of victories (matches won, matches lost)
2. In the event of a tie, the following first tiebreaker will apply: The teams will be ranked by the most point gained per match as follows:
  - Match won 3–0 or 3–1: 3 points for the winner, 0 points for the loser
  - Match won 3–2: 2 points for the winner, 1 point for the loser
  - Match forfeited: 3 points for the winner, 0 points (0–25, 0–25, 0–25) for the loser
3. If teams are still tied after examining the number of victories and points gained, then the FIVB will examine the results in order to break the tie in the following order:
  - Set quotient: if two or more teams are tied on the number of points gained, they will be ranked by the quotient resulting from the division of the number of all set won by the number of all sets lost.
  - Points quotient: if the tie persists based on the set quotient, the teams will be ranked by the quotient resulting from the division of all points scored by the total of points lost during all sets.
  - If the tie persists based on the point quotient, the tie will be broken based on the team that won the match of the Round Robin Phase between the tied teams. When the tie in point quotient is between three or more teams, these teams ranked taking into consideration only the matches involving the teams in question.

== Results ==
All times are Japan Standard Time (UTC+09:00).

=== First round ===
==== Pool A ====
Pos	Team	Pld	W	L	Pts	SW	SL	SR	SPW	SPL	SPR	Qualification
1	Netherlands	5	5	0	14	15	3	5.000	435	375	1.160	Second round
2	Japan	5	4	1	13	14	3	4.667	417	309	1.350	Second round
3	Germany	5	3	2	9	10	6	1.667	401	351	1.142	Second round
4	Mexico	5	1	4	3	4	12	0.333	312	383	0.815	Second round
5	Argentina	5	1	4	3	3	12	0.250	308	363	0.848	
6	Cameroon	5	1	4	3	3	13	0.231	294	386	0.762	

Date	Time		Score		Set 1	Set 2	Set 3	Set 4	Set 5	Total	Report
29 Sep	13:10	Mexico	1–3	Cameroon	25–17	23–25	16–25	21–25		85–92	P2 Report
29 Sep	15:40	Germany	1–3	Netherlands	25–22	21–25	22–25	30–32		98–104	P2 Report
29 Sep	19:20	Argentina	0–3	Japan	15–25	13–25	12–25			40–75	P2 Report
30 Sep	13:40	Cameroon	0–3	Germany	14–25	10–25	16–25			40–75	P2 Report
30 Sep	16:10	Argentina	0–3	Mexico	20–25	23–25	23–25			66–75	P2 Report
30 Sep	19:20	Japan	2–3	Netherlands	25–27	25–16	26–28	25–19	13–15	114–105	P2 Report
1 Oct	13:40	Germany	3–0	Argentina	25–21	34–32	25–18			84–71	P2 Report
1 Oct	16:10	Netherlands	3–0	Cameroon	25–16	26–24	25–18			76–58	P2 Report
1 Oct	19:20	Mexico	0–3	Japan	15–25	15–25	15–25			45–75	P2 Report
3 Oct	13:40	Argentina	0–3	Netherlands	17–25	17–25	22–25			56–75	P2 Report
3 Oct	16:10	Mexico	0–3	Germany	19–25	17–25	22–25			58–75	P2 Report
3 Oct	19:20	Japan	3–0	Cameroon	25–19	25–20	25–11			75–50	P2 Report
4 Oct	13:40	Netherlands	3–0	Mexico	25–19	25–14	25–16			75–49	P2 Report
4 Oct	16:10	Cameroon	0–3	Argentina	22–25	20–25	12–25			54–75	P2 Report
4 Oct	19:20	Germany	0–3	Japan	25–27	20–25	24–26			69–78	P2 Report

==== Pool B ====
Pos	Team	Pld	W	L	Pts	SW	SL	SR	SPW	SPL	SPR	Qualification
1	Italy	5	5	0	15	15	1	15.000	396	290	1.366	Second round
2	China	5	4	1	12	13	4	3.250	407	342	1.190	Second round
3	Turkey	5	3	2	9	9	7	1.286	364	309	1.178	Second round
4	Bulgaria	5	2	3	6	7	10	0.700	361	383	0.943	Second round
5	Canada	5	1	4	3	4	13	0.308	332	401	0.828	
6	Cuba	5	0	5	0	2	15	0.133	279	414	0.674	

Date	Time		Score		Set 1	Set 2	Set 3	Set 4	Set 5	Total	Report
29 Sep	13:40	Bulgaria	0–3	Italy	15–25	19–25	22–25			56–75	P2 Report
29 Sep	16:10	Turkey	3–0	Canada	25–18	25–13	25–15			75–46	P2 Report
29 Sep	19:20	China	3–0	Cuba	25–12	25–23	25–14			75–49	P2 Report
30 Sep	13:40	Canada	0–3	Italy	15–25	15–25	18–25			48–75	P2 Report
30 Sep	16:10	Cuba	0–3	Bulgaria	10–25	20–25	14–25			44–75	P2 Report
30 Sep	19:20	Turkey	0–3	China	18–25	23–25	23–25			64–75	P2 Report
2 Oct	13:40	Italy	3–0	Cuba	25–11	25–18	25–20			75–49	P2 Report
2 Oct	16:10	Bulgaria	0–3	Turkey	17–25	23–25	12–25			52–75	P2 Report
2 Oct	19:20	China	3–0	Canada	25–21	25–21	25–13			75–55	P2 Report
3 Oct	13:40	Turkey	0–3	Italy	19–25	21–25	12–25			52–75	P2 Report
3 Oct	16:10	Canada	3–1	Cuba	16–25	25–13	25–18	25–20		91–76	P2 Report
3 Oct	19:20	China	3–1	Bulgaria	22–25	25–22	25–14	25–17		97–78	P2 Report
4 Oct	13:40	Bulgaria	3–1	Canada	23–25	27–25	25–21	25–21		100–92	P2 Report
4 Oct	16:10	Cuba	1–3	Turkey	15–25	14–25	25–23	7–25		61–98	P2 Report
4 Oct	19:20	Italy	3–1	China	20–25	26–24	25–16	25–20		96–85	P2 Report

==== Pool C ====
Pos	Team	Pld	W	L	Pts	SW	SL	SR	SPW	SPL	SPR	Qualification
1	United States	5	5	0	13	15	5	3.000	454	387	1.173	Second round
2	Russia	5	4	1	12	14	5	2.800	433	356	1.216	Second round
3	Thailand	5	3	2	10	13	10	1.300	471	467	1.009	Second round
4	Azerbaijan	5	2	3	6	7	10	0.700	393	383	1.026	Second round
5	South Korea	5	1	4	4	7	12	0.583	400	426	0.939	
6	Trinidad and Tobago	5	0	5	0	1	15	0.067	271	403	0.672	

Date	Time		Score		Set 1	Set 2	Set 3	Set 4	Set 5	Total	Report
29 Sep	13:40	Russia	3–0	Trinidad and Tobago	25–21	25–11	25–12			75–44	P2 Report
29 Sep	16:10	Azerbaijan	0–3	United States	27–29	21–25	21–25			69–79	P2 Report
29 Sep	19:20	South Korea	2–3	Thailand	25–18	22–25	19–25	25–13	11–15	102–96	P2 Report
30 Sep	13:40	United States	3–0	Trinidad and Tobago	25–11	25–12	25–11			75–34	P2 Report
30 Sep	16:10	Azerbaijan	3–1	South Korea	25–18	25–18	23–25	25–18		98–79	P2 Report
30 Sep	19:20	Thailand	2–3	Russia	25–21	25–17	13–25	21–25	9–15	93–103	P2 Report
2 Oct	13:40	Russia	3–0	Azerbaijan	25–21	25–21	25–22			75–64	P2 Report
2 Oct	16:10	Trinidad and Tobago	1–3	Thailand	17–25	17–25	25–23	11–25		70–98	P2 Report
2 Oct	19:20	United States	3–1	South Korea	19–25	25–21	25–21	25–18		94–85	P2 Report
3 Oct	13:40	Azerbaijan	3–0	Trinidad and Tobago	29–27	25–16	25–17			79–60	P2 Report
3 Oct	16:10	South Korea	0–3	Russia	23–25	20–25	15–25			58–75	P2 Report
3 Oct	19:20	United States	3–2	Thailand	25–17	25–16	23–25	21–25	15–11	109–94	P2 Report
4 Oct	13:40	Trinidad and Tobago	0–3	South Korea	24–26	16–25	23–25			63–76	P2 Report
4 Oct	16:10	Thailand	3–1	Azerbaijan	25–22	15–25	25–19	25–17		90–83	P2 Report
4 Oct	19:20	Russia	2–3	United States	25–19	20–25	24–26	25–12	11–15	105–97	P2 Report

==== Pool D ====
Pos	Team	Pld	W	L	Pts	SW	SL	SR	SPW	SPL	SPR	Qualification
1	Serbia	5	5	0	15	15	0	MAX	377	262	1.439	Second round
2	Brazil	5	4	1	12	12	3	4.000	360	259	1.390	Second round
3	Dominican Republic	5	3	2	9	9	6	1.500	341	292	1.168	Second round
4	Puerto Rico	5	2	3	6	6	9	0.667	318	344	0.924	Second round
5	Kenya	5	1	4	3	3	12	0.250	231	366	0.631	
6	Kazakhstan	5	0	5	0	0	15	0.000	271	375	0.723	

Date	Time		Score		Set 1	Set 2	Set 3	Set 4	Set 5	Total	Report
29 Sep	13:40	Puerto Rico	0–3	Brazil	25–27	12–25	7–25			44–77	P2 Report
29 Sep	16:10	Dominican Republic	0–3	Serbia	17–25	20–25	22–25			59–75	P2 Report
29 Sep	19:20	Kazakhstan	0–3	Kenya	23–25	22–25	21–25			66–75	P2 Report
30 Sep	13:40	Brazil	3–0	Dominican Republic	25–15	25–20	25–22			75–57	P2 Report
30 Sep	16:10	Kazakhstan	0–3	Puerto Rico	21–25	15–25	22–25			58–75	P2 Report
30 Sep	19:20	Kenya	0–3	Serbia	16–25	9–25	8–25			33–75	P2 Report
1 Oct	13:40	Dominican Republic	3–0	Kazakhstan	25–22	25–15	25–19			75–56	P2 Report
1 Oct	16:10	Puerto Rico	3–0	Kenya	25–20	25–22	25–15			75–57	P2 Report
1 Oct	19:20	Serbia	3–0	Brazil	25–21	25–18	25–19			75–58	P2 Report
3 Oct	13:40	Puerto Rico	0–3	Dominican Republic	22–25	17–25	20–25			59–75	P2 Report
3 Oct	16:10	Kazakhstan	0–3	Serbia	18–25	16–25	13–25			47–75	P2 Report
3 Oct	19:20	Kenya	0–3	Brazil	13–25	10–25	16–25			39–75	P2 Report
4 Oct	13:40	Serbia	3–0	Puerto Rico	25–23	25–17	27–25			77–65	P2 Report
4 Oct	16:10	Dominican Republic	3–0	Kenya	25–5	25–7	25–15			75–27	P2 Report
4 Oct	19:20	Brazil	3–0	Kazakhstan	25–11	25–20	25–13			75–44	P2 Report

=== Second round ===
==== Pool E ====
Pos	Team	Pld	W	L	Pts	SW	SL	SR	SPW	SPL	SPR	Qualification
1	Netherlands	9	8	1	24	26	6	4.333	756	634	1.192	Third round
2	Japan	9	7	2	22	25	9	2.778	805	670	1.201	Third round
3	Serbia	9	7	2	21	22	6	3.667	669	532	1.258	Third round
4	Brazil	9	7	2	20	23	11	2.091	790	650	1.215	
5	Dominican Republic	9	5	4	16	17	12	1.417	646	576	1.122	
6	Germany	9	5	4	14	16	15	1.067	714	714	1.000	
7	Puerto Rico	9	3	6	9	10	19	0.526	615	678	0.907	
8	Mexico	9	1	8	3	6	24	0.250	569	724	0.786	

Date	Time		Score		Set 1	Set 2	Set 3	Set 4	Set 5	Total	Report
7 Oct	10:40	Mexico	0–3	Serbia	19–25	17–25	15–25			51–75	P2 Report
7 Oct	13:25	Germany	3–2	Brazil	14–25	19–25	32–30	25–19	17–15	107–114	P2 Report
7 Oct	16:10	Netherlands	3–0	Puerto Rico	25–16	25–15	25–20			75–51	P2 Report
7 Oct	19:20	Japan	3–2	Dominican Republic	25–17	28–26	22–25	25–27	15–11	115–106	P2 Report
8 Oct	10:40	Germany	0–3	Serbia	14–25	20–25	20–25			54–75	P2 Report
8 Oct	13:25	Mexico	1–3	Brazil	25–23	23–25	13–25	19–25		80–98	P2 Report
8 Oct	16:10	Netherlands	3–0	Dominican Republic	25–19	25–16	25–14			75–49	P2 Report
8 Oct	19:20	Japan	3–0	Puerto Rico	25–22	25–14	25–18			75–54	P2 Report
10 Oct	10:40	Mexico	0–3	Dominican Republic	13–25	18–25	15–25			46–75	P2 Report
10 Oct	13:25	Netherlands	2–3	Brazil	25–21	18–25	27–25	19–25	7–15	96–111	P2 Report
10 Oct	16:10	Germany	3–1	Puerto Rico	25–23	25–27	29–27	25–22		104–99	P2 Report
10 Oct	19:30	Japan	3–1	Serbia	15–25	25–23	25–23	25–23		90–94	P2 Report
11 Oct	10:40	Mexico	1–3	Puerto Rico	17–25	19–25	25–18	19–25		80–93	P2 Report
11 Oct	13:25	Germany	0–3	Dominican Republic	12–25	19–25	17–25			48–75	P2 Report
11 Oct	16:10	Netherlands	3–0	Serbia	25–16	25–12	25–20			75–48	P2 Report
11 Oct	19:20	Japan	2–3	Brazil	25–23	25–16	26–28	21–25	11–15	108–107	P2 Report

==== Pool F ====
Pos	Team	Pld	W	L	Pts	SW	SL	SR	SPW	SPL	SPR	Qualification
1	Italy	9	9	0	27	27	3	9.000	738	538	1.372	Third round
2	China	9	8	1	24	25	5	5.000	732	605	1.210	Third round
3	United States	9	7	2	19	22	11	2.000	743	658	1.129	Third round
4	Russia	9	6	3	18	22	12	1.833	776	682	1.138	
5	Turkey	9	5	4	15	15	15	1.000	663	633	1.047	
6	Bulgaria	9	4	5	11	14	18	0.778	674	722	0.934	
7	Thailand	9	3	6	11	16	22	0.727	776	826	0.939	
8	Azerbaijan	9	2	7	6	8	22	0.364	630	706	0.892	

Date	Time		Score		Set 1	Set 2	Set 3	Set 4	Set 5	Total	Report
7 Oct	10:40	Turkey	0–3	Russia	15–25	17–25	16–25			48–75	P2 Report
7 Oct	13:25	Bulgaria	0–3	United States	16–25	17–25	11–25			44–75	P2 Report
7 Oct	16:10	Italy	3–0	Azerbaijan	25–12	25–19	25–10			75–41	P2 Report
7 Oct	19:20	China	3–0	Thailand	28–26	25–20	25–23			78–69	P2 Report
8 Oct	10:40	Bulgaria	1–3	Russia	21–25	20–25	25–23	19–25		85–98	P2 Report
8 Oct	13:25	Turkey	0–3	United States	21–25	17–25	18–25			56–75	P2 Report
8 Oct	16:10	China	3–0	Azerbaijan	25–17	25–16	25–17			75–50	P2 Report
8 Oct	19:20	Italy	3–0	Thailand	25–15	25–12	25–15			75–42	P2 Report
10 Oct	10:40	Turkey	3–1	Azerbaijan	26–24	25–17	22–25	25–21		98–87	P2 Report
10 Oct	13:25	Bulgaria	3–2	Thailand	25–18	22–25	18–25	25–22	19–17	109–107	P2 Report
10 Oct	16:10	Italy	3–1	Russia	22–25	25–20	25–18	25–22		97–85	P2 Report
10 Oct	19:20	China	3–0	United States	25–17	26–24	25–18			76–59	P2 Report
11 Oct	10:40	Bulgaria	3–0	Azerbaijan	25–19	25–20	25–20			75–59	P2 Report
11 Oct	13:25	Turkey	3–1	Thailand	22–25	25–20	25–22	25–20		97–87	P2 Report
11 Oct	16:10	Italy	3–1	United States	25–16	25–23	20–25	25–16		95–80	P2 Report
11 Oct	19:20	China	3–1	Russia	25–22	21–25	25–23	25–15		96–85	P2 Report

=== Third round ===
==== Pool G ====
Pos	Team	Pld	W	L	Pts	SW	SL	SR	SPW	SPL	SPR	Qualification
1	Serbia	2	2	0	6	6	1	6.000	173	148	1.169	Semifinals
2	Italy	2	1	1	2	4	5	0.800	194	202	0.960	Semifinals
3	Japan	2	0	2	1	2	6	0.333	164	181	0.906	5th place match

Date	Time		Score		Set 1	Set 2	Set 3	Set 4	Set 5	Total	Report
14 Oct	19:20	Japan	0–3	Serbia	19–25	18–25	23–25			60–75	P2 Report
15 Oct	19:20	Italy	3–2	Japan	25–20	22–25	25–21	19–25	15–13	106–104	P2 Report
16 Oct	16:10	Italy	1–3	Serbia	21–25	19–25	25–23	23–25		88–98	P2 Report

==== Pool H ====
Pos	Team	Pld	W	L	Pts	SW	SL	SR	SPW	SPL	SPR	Qualification
1	China	2	2	0	5	6	3	2.000	202	177	1.141	Semifinals
2	Netherlands	2	1	1	2	4	5	0.800	183	201	0.910	Semifinals
3	United States	2	0	2	2	4	6	0.667	207	214	0.967	5th place match

Date	Time		Score		Set 1	Set 2	Set 3	Set 4	Set 5	Total	Report
14 Oct	16:10	China	3–2	United States	25–22	19–25	20–25	25–23	15–9	104–104	P2 Report
15 Oct	16:10	Netherlands	3–2	United States	30–32	15–25	25–22	25–15	15–9	110–103	P2 Report
16 Oct	19:20	Netherlands	1–3	China	25–23	13–25	18–25	17–25		73–98	P2 Report

=== Final round ===
Semifinals
19 October
Serbia	3
Netherlands	1
19 October
China	2
Italy	3

Final
20 October
Serbia	3
Italy	2
3rd place
20 October
Netherlands	0
China	3

==== Semifinals ====
Date	Time		Score		Set 1	Set 2	Set 3	Set 4	Set 5	Total	Report
19 Oct	13:40	Serbia	3–1	Netherlands	25–22	26–28	25–19	25–23		101–92	P2 Report
19 Oct	16:30	China	2–3	Italy	18–25	25–21	16–25	31–29	15–17	105–117	P2 Report

==== 5th place match ====
Date	Time		Score		Set 1	Set 2	Set 3	Set 4	Set 5	Total	Report
19 Oct	19:20	Japan	1–3	United States	23–25	16–25	25–23	23–25		87–98	P2 Report

==== 3rd place match ====
Date	Time		Score		Set 1	Set 2	Set 3	Set 4	Set 5	Total	Report
20 Oct	17:20	Netherlands	0–3	China	22–25	19–25	14–25			55–75	P2 Report

==== Final ====
Date	Time		Score		Set 1	Set 2	Set 3	Set 4	Set 5	Total	Report
20 Oct	19:40	Serbia	3–2	Italy	21–25	25–14	23–25	25–19	15–12	109–95	P2 Report

== Final standing ==
Rank	Team
1st place, gold medalist(s)	Serbia
2nd place, silver medalist(s)	Italy
3rd place, bronze medalist(s)	China
4	Netherlands
5	United States
6	Japan
7	Brazil
8	Russia
9	Dominican Republic
10	Turkey
11	Germany
12	Bulgaria
13	Thailand
14	Puerto Rico
15	Azerbaijan
16	Mexico
17	South Korea
18	Canada
19	Argentina
20	Kenya
21	Cameroon
22	Cuba
23	Trinidad and Tobago
24	Kazakhstan

Source: WCH Final standings

2018 Women's World champions

Serbia
1st title

Team roster
Bianka Buša, Bojana Živković, Tijana Malešević, Brankica Mihajlović, Maja Ognjenović (c), Stefana Veljković, Teodora Pušić, Ana Bjelica, Maja Aleksić, Jovana Stevanović, Milena Rašić, Silvija Popović, Tijana Bošković, Bojana Milenković
Head coach
Zoran Terzić

== Awards ==
- Most valuable player
  (Serbia) Tijana Bošković
- Best setter
  (Italy) Ofelia Malinov
- Best outside spikers
  (Italy) Miriam Sylla
  (China) Zhu Ting
- Best middle blockers
  (China) Yan Ni
  (Serbia) Milena Rašić
- Best opposite spiker
  (Italy) Paola Egonu
- Best libero
  (Italy) Monica De Gennaro

== Statistics leaders ==
The statistics of each group follows the vis reports P2 and P3. The statistics include 6 volleyball skills; serve, reception, set, spike, block, and dig. The table below shows the top 5 ranked players in each skill plus top scorers at the completion of the tournament. Only players whose teams advanced to the third round are taken in consideration.

Best Scorers
	Player	Spikes	Blocks	Serves	Total
1	(Italy) Paola Egonu	275	26	23	324
2	(Netherlands) Lonneke Slöetjes	233	16	27	276
3	(China) Zhu Ting	202	17	8	227
4	(Serbia) Tijana Bošković	176	11	6	193
5	(Japan) Sarina Koga	156	8	7	171

Best Spikers
	Player	Spikes	Faults	Shots	Total	%
1	(Serbia) Tijana Bošković	176	50	102	328	53.66
2	(Italy) Miriam Sylla	141	22	121	284	49.65
3	(Italy) Paola Egonu	275	83	205	563	48.85
4	(Netherlands) Lonneke Slöetjes	233	68	186	487	47.84
5	(Serbia) Brankica Mihajlović	148	41	124	313	47.28

Best Blockers
	Player	Blocks	Faults	Rebounds	Total	Avg
1	(China) Yan Ni	42	17	91	150	0.89
2	(Italy) Anna Danesi	41	28	109	178	0.84
3	(Serbia) Milena Rašić	35	34	58	127	0.80
4	(China) Yuan Xinyue	30	21	99	150	0.64
5	(Italy) Cristina Chirichella	31	21	79	131	0.63

Best Servers
	Player	Aces	Faults	Hits	Total	Avg
1	(Netherlands) Lonneke Slöetjes	27	24	103	154	0.56
2	(Italy) Paola Egonu	23	42	130	195	0.47
3	(China) Yuan Xinyue	18	7	159	184	0.38
4	(Serbia) Maja Ognjenović	15	13	147	175	0.34
5	(China) Li Yingying	16	8	68	92	0.34

Best Setters
	Player	Running	Faults	Still	Total	Avg
1	(Italy) Ofelia Malinov	196	9	844	1049	4.00
2	(China) Ding Xia	175	8	822	1005	3.72
3	(Netherlands) Laura Dijkema	149	5	832	986	3.10
4	(United States) Carli Lloyd	127	6	799	932	2.70
5	(Japan) Kanami Tashiro	124	6	1115	1245	2.70

Best Diggers
	Player	Digs	Faults	Receptions	Total	Avg
1	(Serbia) Silvija Popović	142	6	46	194	3.23
2	(United States) Kelsey Robinson	150	13	34	197	3.19
3	(Italy) Monica De Gennaro	151	12	48	211	3.08
4	(Italy) Lucia Bosetti	121	9	24	154	2.47
5	(Netherlands) Kirsten Knip	116	1	37	154	2.42

Best Receivers
	Player	Excellents	Faults	Serve	Total	%
1	(Japan) Mako Kobata	123	12	105	240	46.25
2	(United States) Kelsey Robinson	86	7	98	191	41.36
3	(Italy) Monica De Gennaro	80	10	121	211	33.18
4	(Japan) Sarina Koga	64	9	123	196	28.06
5	(United States) Kimberly Hill	80	16	145	241	26.56

== Marketing ==
=== Sponsors ===
- Mikasa Sports
- Senoh
- Gerflor
- Asics
- Salonpas
- Volleyball TV
- Kobe
- Volleyball World app
- Japanet
- Schenker AG
- Imuse
- Yokohama
- Sapporo
- Hamamatsu
- Osaka
- Nagoya
- Ganten Water

=== Local performance ===
According to Japan leading news paper 朝日新聞, the two Japanese local business partner were reported to lost money on hosting the competition. TBS is expected to lose nearly 1 billion yen due to bad sales at commercial advertisements. And JVA was expected to lose 600 million yen as the drop of ticket selling.

== Broadcasting ==
FIVB, through several companies, sold the broadcasting rights for the 2018 World Championship to the following broadcasters.

Country/Region	Broadcaster
Algeria	ENTV
Argentina	TV Pública
Azerbaijan	S sport
Bahrain	ASBU
Belarus	Saran Holding
Belgium	VRT
Bosnia and Herzegovina	Sport Klub
Brazil	Grupo Globo
Bulgaria	Max Sport
China	CCTV, Tencent
Costa Rica	Sky México
Croatia	Sport Klub
Dominica	Sky México
Dominican Republic	Sky México
Egypt	Nile Sport
Europe	Eurosport
Georgia	S sport
Germany	Sportdeutschland.TV
Guatemala	Sky México
Honduras	Sky México
Hong Kong	i-CABLE Sports
Iran	IRIB
Iraq	ASBU
Israel	Charlton
Italy	RAI
Japan	TBS
Jordan	S sport
Kazakhstan	Saran Holding
South Korea	SPOTV
Kuwait	Kuwait TV
Libya	Libya TV
Macedonia	Sport Klub
Malaysia	Astro
Mexico	Sky México
Montenegro	Sport Klub
Morocco	SNRT
Netherlands	Ziggo Sport
Nicaragua	Sky México
Oman	ASBU
Panama	Sky México
Poland	Polsat
Puerto Rico	WAPA-TV
Qatar	ASBU
Russia	Match TV
Saudi Arabia	Saudi TV
Serbia	Sport Klub
Slovenia	Sport Klub
Thailand	Workpoint TV
Trinidad and Tobago	Sky México
Tunisia	El Wataniya 2
Turkey	Saran Holding, S sport
United Arab Emirates	ASBU
United States	FloSports

== See also ==
- 2018 FIVB Volleyball Men's World Championship
