= Republic of Ireland women's national volleyball team =

National sports team

Republic of Ireland
- Association: Volleyball Ireland
- Confederation: CEV
- Head coach: Mark Delahunty (Women) Graham Bell (Men)
- FIVB ranking: NR (1 October 2026)

Uniforms
Home

The Republic of Ireland national volleyball team (recognized as Ireland by FIVB) represents the Republic of Ireland in international volleyball senior competitions and friendly matches. The team is managed by Volleyball Ireland.

== Squads ==
Women's Squad July 2026
Name	Club
Caitríona Ní Riordáin	(Republic of Ireland) Net Force PW
Sophie Quinlivan-Nolan	(Republic of Ireland) Munster Thunder
Amy O'Sullivan	(Republic of Ireland) Munster Thunder
Daria Smolen	(Republic of Ireland) Impact Macroom
Gabriela Smolen	(Republic of Ireland) Impact Macroom
Gemma Brady	(Republic of Ireland) Net Force
Emma Byrne	(Republic of Ireland) Gardians
Eimear Byrne	(Republic of Ireland) Gardians
Doireann Ní Bhraoin	(Republic of Ireland) Munster Thunder
Lara McNichols	(Republic of Ireland) TCD Volleyball
Aoibhin McDonnell	(Republic of Ireland) Santry Calypso
Regina Halpin	(Republic of Ireland) UCD Volleyball
Aoibhin Cassidy	(Republic of Ireland) DVC Lions
Aislinn Carey	(Republic of Ireland) Munster Thunder

Men's Squad July 2026
Name	Club
Ciagan Davoren	(Republic of Ireland) TCD Volleyball
Jordan Donnelly	(Republic of Ireland) Dalkey Devils
Lachlan Donnelly	(United States) Clarke Pride
Sean Eardley	(Republic of Ireland) Dalkey Devils
Zakir Hassan	(Republic of Ireland) Jackals VC
Ben O’Sullivan	(Republic of Ireland) UCC Volleyball
Roimarc Dave Valdez	(Republic of Ireland) Carrick Crows
Julian Njuguna	(Republic of Ireland) Balbriggan
Sonny Yamada-Brennan	(Republic of Ireland) TCD Volleyball
Idris Al-Ameen Disu	(Republic of Ireland) Balbriggan
Jeremiah Obiekwe	(Italy) Cassano
Cillian O’Riordain	(Scotland) Forza Ragazzi
Peter McGlynn	(Slovakia) Črnuče Ljubljana pri Dunaji
Mark Bumatay	(Republic of Ireland) Carrick Crows
