= Faroe Islands women's national volleyball team =

Women's national volleyball team representing Faroe Islands

Faroe Islands
- Association: faroese Volleyball Federation
- Confederation: CEV
- FIVB ranking: NR (29 June 2025)

Uniforms
Home	Away

The Faroe Islands women's national volleyball team ( Faroese : Føroyska landsliðið í flogbólti hjá kvinnum, Danish : Færøernes damelandsholdet volleyball ) represents Faroe Islands in international women's volleyball competitions and friendly matches, The Team Ruled and managed by the faroese Volleyball Association that is a part of the Federation of International Volleyball (FIVB) as well as the European Volleyball Confederation (CEV), The faroese Team also follow two regional European Volleyball bodies which are the North European Volleyball Zonal Association (NEVZA) and the Small Countries Association (SCA).

== Team history ==
The Faroese women's national volleyball team Never managed to Qualify to any major international volleyball Events throughout its history like the FIVB Volleyball Women's World Championship, Olympic Games, European Championship they often Participate in Regional competitions like Small Countries Division Championship their best results in this Tournament was the Third place in two occasions in 2019, 2022.
