= 2025 FIVB Women's Volleyball World Championship seeding =

External videos
- Drawing of Lots

The draw for the 2025 FIVB Women's Volleyball World Championship took place on 17 December 2024 at The Grand Fourwings Convention Hotel in Bangkok, Thailand. It set the stage for the round-robin pool phase in Thailand, whence the World Championship will be played.

Based on the FIVB World Rankings at the end of August 2024, the tournament seeding followed a protocol where Thailand, as the host country, was automatically assigned to position A1, and the top seven teams in the World Rankings were placed as the first position in their respective pools. These top-seeded teams include Italy (B1), Brazil (C1), the United States (D1), Turkey (E1), China (F1), Poland (G1) and Japan (H1), distributing the highest-ranked teams across different pools.

For the draw, the 24 non-seeded teams were allocated into three pots based on the World Rankings. Pot 1 featured the next eight high-ranked teams, notably including the defending champion Serbia, while Pot 2 contained the subsequent eight highest-ranked teams, and Pot 3 comprised the eight lowest-ranked teams in the competition. The draw process followed a systematic approach, beginning with Pot 3 and concluding with Pot 1, where each selected team was assigned to the available pool in alphabetical order, utilizing a serpentine system that alternates the direction of team placement.

== Personnel involved ==
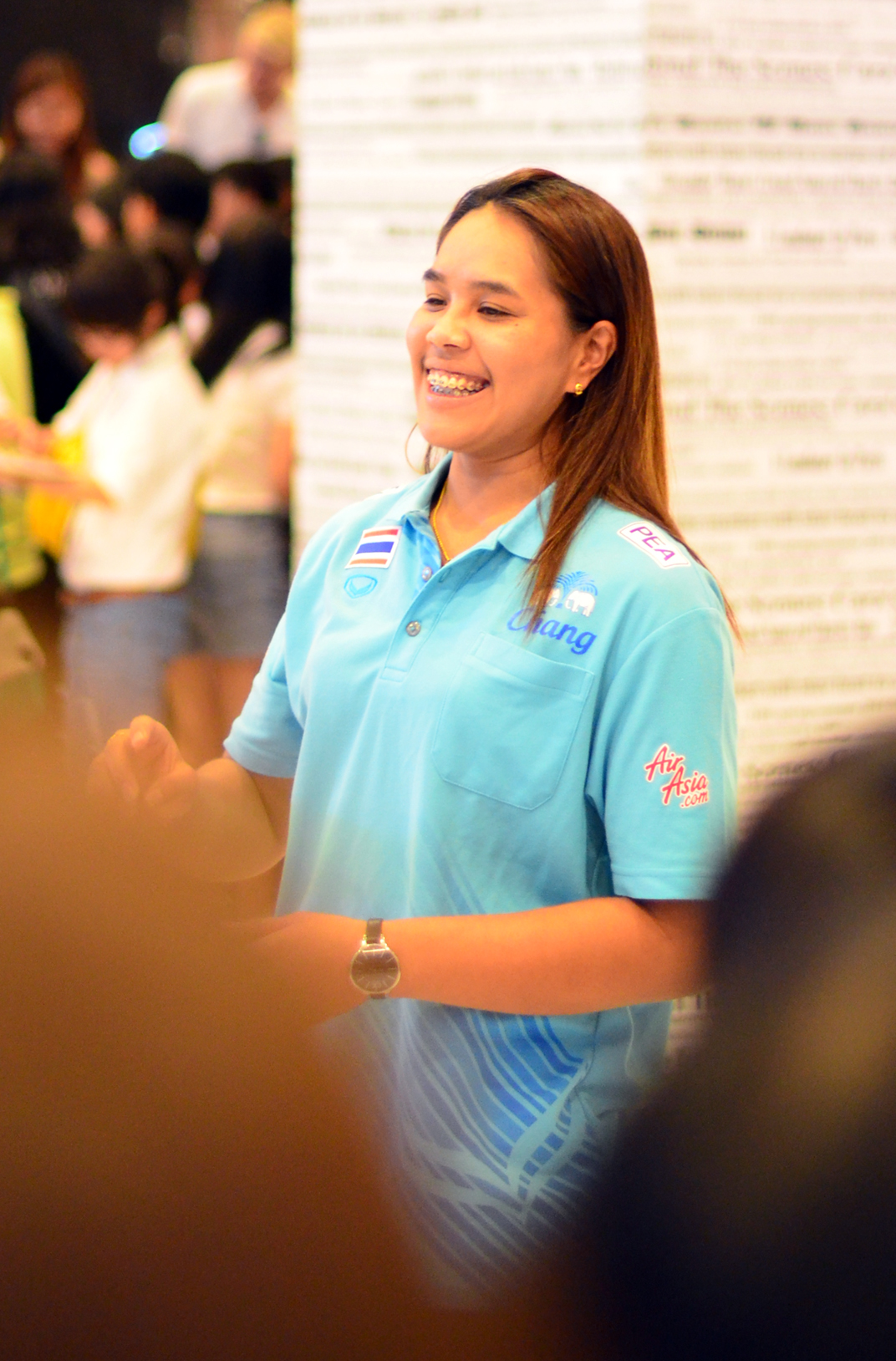
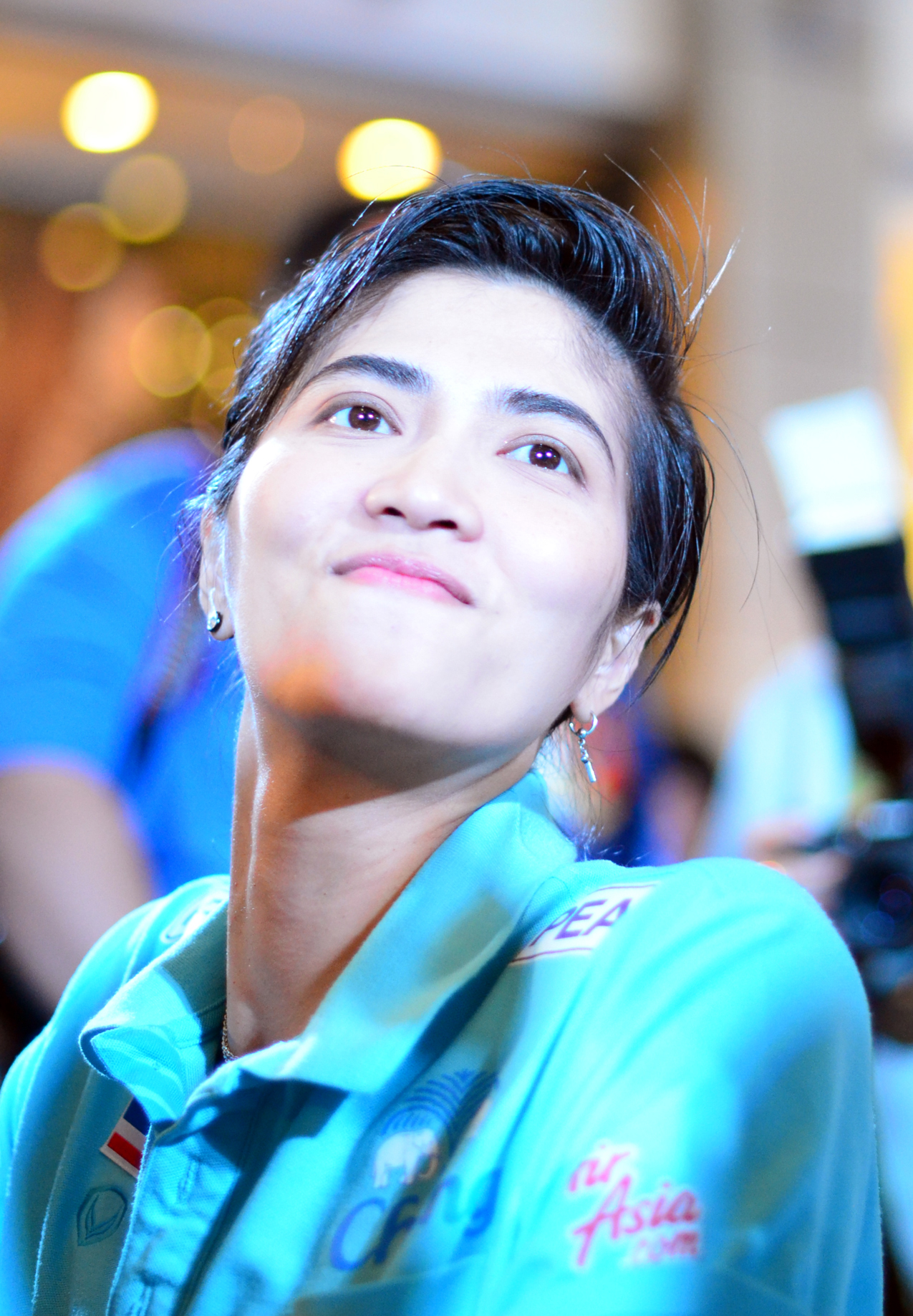
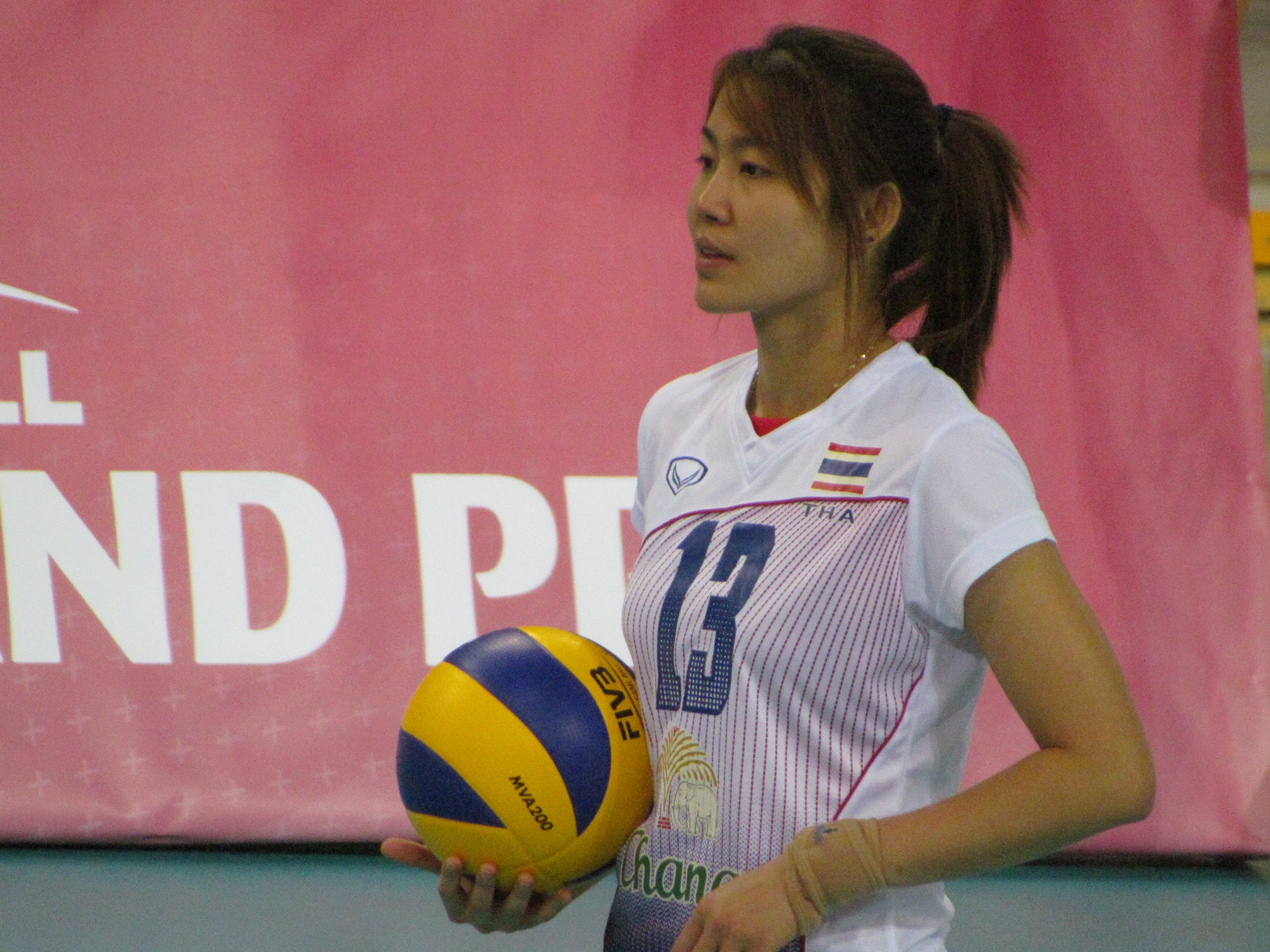
Drawing assistants: Onuma Sittirak for pot 3; Pleumjit Thinkaow for pot 2; and Nootsara Tomkom for pot 1

The draw was graced by the presence of Sorawong Thienthong, Minister of Tourism and Sports (MOTS); Ramon Suzara, President of the Asian Volleyball Confederation (AVC) and Vice President of the FIVB; Somporn Chaibangyang, President of the Thailand Volleyball Association (TVA); Preecha Lalun, Deputy Governor of the Sports Authority of Thailand (SAT); and Kiattipong Radchatagriengkai, Head coach of the Thailand women's national volleyball team and led by three of seven legends of Thai volleyball, including Onuma Sittirak, Pleumjit Thinkaow, and Nootsara Tomkom.

== Seedings ==
Teams were seeded using the FIVB World Rankings at the end of August 2024 (shown in parentheses), which were published on 30 August 2024.

| Seeded teams | Pot 1 | Pot 2 | Pot 3 |
|---|---|---|---|
| Thailand (13) (hosts); Italy (1); Brazil (2); United States (3); Turkey (4); China (5); Poland (6); Japan (7) | Canada (8); Netherlands (9); Serbia (10); Dominican Republic (11); Germany (12); Belgium (14); Czech Republic (15); Puerto Rico (16) | Argentina (17); Ukraine (18); France (19); Bulgaria (20); Colombia (21); Kenya (22); Cuba (23); Sweden (24) | Mexico (25); Slovenia (26); Cameroon (27); Slovakia (28); Spain (29); Greece (30); Vietnam (33); Egypt (36) |

== Final draw ==
The eight pools were formed through a random draw, with one team selected from each of the three pots and assigned to a pool based on their pot placement. Eight teams had their positions in the draw predetermined: host nation Thailand, positioned as A1, and the top seven teams in the World Rankings, each occupying the first position in their respective pools. These top-seeded teams include Italy (B1), Brazil (C1), the United States (D1), Turkey (E1), China (F1), Poland (G1), and Japan (H1).

Pool A and H will play at the Indoor Stadium Huamark in Bangkok, while Pool B and G will play at the Phuket Municipal Stadium in Phuket. Pool C and F will be staged at the Chiang Mai International Exhibition and Convention Centre in Chiang Mai, and the Korat Chatchai Hall in Nakhon Ratchasima will host Pool D and E.

Pool A
| Pos. | Team |
|---|---|
| A1 | Thailand |
| A2 | Netherlands |
| A3 | Sweden |
| A4 | Egypt |

Pool B
| Pos. | Team |
|---|---|
| B1 | Italy |
| B2 | Belgium |
| B3 | Cuba |
| B4 | Slovakia |

Pool C
| Pos. | Team |
|---|---|
| C1 | Brazil |
| C2 | Puerto Rico |
| C3 | France |
| C4 | Greece |

Pool D
| Pos. | Team |
|---|---|
| D1 | United States |
| D2 | Czech Republic |
| D3 | Argentina |
| D4 | Slovenia |

Pool E
| Pos. | Team |
|---|---|
| E1 | Turkey |
| E2 | Canada |
| E3 | Bulgaria |
| E4 | Spain |

Pool F
| Pos. | Team |
|---|---|
| F1 | China |
| F2 | Dominican Republic |
| F3 | Colombia |
| F4 | Mexico |

Pool G
| Pos. | Team |
|---|---|
| G1 | Poland |
| G2 | Germany |
| G3 | Kenya |
| G4 | Vietnam |

Pool G
| Pos. | Team |
|---|---|
| H1 | Japan |
| H2 | Serbia |
| H3 | Ukraine |
| H4 | Cameroon |
