= 2025 FIVB Women's Volleyball World Championship final =

เอฟไอวีบีวอลเลย์บอลหญิงชิงแชมป์โลก 2025
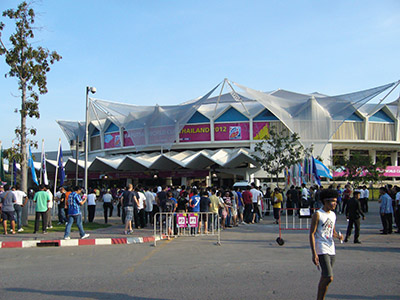
- The Indoor Stadium Huamark in Bangkok hosted the match
- Event: 2025 FIVB Women's Volleyball World Championship
Turkey	Italy
(Turkey)	(Italy)
2	3
Head coach: Daniele Santarelli (ITA)	Head coach: Julio Velasco (ITA)
- Italy won in five sets
	1	2	3	4	5
Turkey	23	25	24	25	8
Italy	25	13	26	19	15
- Date: 7 September 2025
- Venue: Indoor Stadium Huamark, Bangkok
- Referees: Karina Noemi Rene (ARG); Joo-Hee Kang (KOR)
- Attendance: 5,719

The 2025 FIVB Women's Volleyball World Championship final was the final match of the 2025 FIVB Women's Volleyball World Championship, the 20th edition of FIVB's competition for women's national volleyball teams. The match was played at the Indoor Stadium Huamark in Bangkok, Thailand, on 7 September 2025, between Turkey and Italy. It was the first all-European final since 2018 in Japan, when Serbia won its first title against Italy.

== Background ==
The 2025 FIVB Women's Volleyball World Championship was the 20th edition of the tournament. It was held in four cities of Thailand from 22 August to 7 September 2025, and the first edition under the two-year cycles in odd-numbered years with an expanded format featuring 32 teams. It was also the first World Championship to be hosted in Southeast Asia.

The host country Thailand and the defending champion Serbia qualified automatically. Meanwhile, the other fifteen teams (three per confederation) qualified through the Continental Championships in 2023. The remaining fifteen places (twelve from CEV and three from NORCECA) were allocated to the highest-ranked teams according to the FIVB World Rankings at the end of August 2024. Therefore, all of the teams were from all confederations with sixteen from CEV, six from NORCECA, four from AVC, three from CAVB, and another three from CSV.

Of the 32 teams qualified, 21 teams were returning after appearing in the 2022 edition. Slovakia, Slovenia, Sweden and Vietnam made their World Championship debut. Meanwhile, France, Spain, Ukraine, Greece and Egypt returned to the tournament after long absences, having last participated in 1974, 1982, 1994, 2002 and 2006, respectively. Additionally, Cuba and Mexico returned to the tournament after missing the 2022 edition. In contrast, South Korea, Kazakhstan and Croatia, all of whom qualified for the 2022 edition, failed to qualify due to insufficient rankings.

The defending champions Serbia finished at the second in their preliminary pool behind Japan, and were eliminated by the Netherlands in the round of 16. Italy reached the finals in 2002 and 2018, winning the title in the former. Meanwhile, Turkey have never reached the finals.

== Route to the final ==
Turkey
Round
Italy
Opponent
Result
Preliminary round
Opponent
Result
Spain
3–0
Match 1
Slovakia
3–0
Bulgaria
3–0
Match 2
Cuba
3–0
Canada
3–0
Match 3
Belgium
3–1
Pool E winner

Pos	Team	Pld	Pts
1	Turkey	3	9
2	Canada	3	5
3	Spain	3	4
4	Bulgaria	3	0

Source: FIVB Women's World Championship - Standings
Final standings
Pool B winner

Pos	Team	Pld	Pts
1	Italy	3	9
2	Belgium	3	6
3	Cuba	3	3
4	Slovakia	3	0

Source: FIVB Women's World Championship - Standings
Opponent
Result
Final round
Opponent
Result
Slovenia
3–0
Round of 16
Germany
3–0
United States
3–1
Quarterfinals
Poland
3–0
Japan
3–1
Semifinals
Brazil
3–2

== Match details ==
The teams recently faced each other in the 2025 FIVB Women's Volleyball Nations League, where Italy won 3–2. This is the fourth game between Turkey and Italy in the World Championship. Italy has won all three of their previous meetings in 2006, 2010, and 2018.

7 September 2025; 19:30	Turkey	2–3	Italy	Indoor Stadium Huamark, Bangkok; Attendance: 5,719; Referees: Karina Noemi Rene (ARG), Joo-Hee Kang (KOR)
7 September 2025; 19:30	(23–25, 25–13, 24–26, 25–19, 8–15); P2 Report			Indoor Stadium Huamark, Bangkok; Attendance: 5,719; Referees: Karina Noemi Rene (ARG), Joo-Hee Kang (KOR)
7 September 2025; 19:30	Scoring leaders			Indoor Stadium Huamark, Bangkok; Attendance: 5,719; Referees: Karina Noemi Rene (ARG), Joo-Hee Kang (KOR)
Vargas (33/95)		Total	Egonu (22/77)
Vargas (28/69)		Attack	Egonu (18/58)
Erdem (3/17)		Block	Sylla (4/11)
Vargas (4/20)		Serve	Egonu (1/8)

== See also ==
- 2025 FIVB Men's Volleyball World Championship final
