= 2025 FIVB Women's Volleyball World Championship final round =

The final round of the 2025 FIVB Women's Volleyball World Championship was the second and final stage of the competition, following the preliminary round. The top two teams from each pool advanced to the final round to compete in a single-elimination format. There were 16 matches in the final round, including a third-place match played between the two losing teams of the semi-finals.

It took place from 23 August to 7 September, with rest days on 2 and 5 September. Each matchday featured two games: at 17:00 and 20:30 for the round of 16 and the quarterfinals, and at 15:30 and 19:30 for the semifinals, 3rd place match, and the final.

== Format ==
The final round followed a single-elimination format with the round of 16 match-ups determined by each team's pool and ranking position. The initial pairings—A1 versus H2, H1 versus A2, D1 versus E2, E1 versus D2, B1 versus G2, G1 versus B2, C1 versus F2, and F1 versus B2—ensured that teams from pools A, D, E, and H would not encounter with teams from pools B, C, F, and G until the final match. As the competition progresses, the round of 16 winners advanced to the quarterfinals. The quarterfinals followed a similar pattern, with victorious teams moving to the next stage of the competition. In the semifinals, the losers competed for the third place, while the winners faced each other in the final match.

== Teams ==
The following sixteen teams from eight pools competed in the final round for the tournament, listed by their pool.

Pool	Winners	Runners-up
A	Netherlands	Thailand
B	Italy	Belgium
C	Brazil	France
D	United States	Slovenia
E	Turkey	Canada
F	China	Dominican Republic
G	Poland	Germany
H	Japan	Serbia

== Bracket ==
All times are Thailand Standard Time (UTC+07:00).

The following sixteen teams are matched up, with bold denoting the winners of each match.

Round of 16
29 August
**Netherlands**	**3**
Serbia	2
29 August
**Japan**	**3**
Thailand	0
1 September
**United States**	**3**
Canada	0
1 September
**Turkey**	**3**
Slovenia	0
30 August
**Italy**	**3**
Germany	0
30 August
**Poland**	**3**
Belgium	2
31 August
**Brazil**	**3**
Dominican Republic	1
31 August
China	1
**France**	**3**

Quarterfinals
3 September
Netherlands	2
**Japan**	**3**
4 September
United States	1
**Turkey**	**3**
3 September
**Italy**	**3**
Poland	0
4 September
**Brazil**	**3**
France	0

Semifinals
6 September
Japan	1
**Turkey**	**3**
6 September
**Italy**	**3**
Brazil	2

Final
7 September
Turkey	2
**Italy**	**3**
3rd place match
7 September
Japan	2
**Brazil**	**3**

== Round of 16 ==
The following round of 16 matches were played at the Indoor Stadium Huamark, Bangkok.

=== Netherlands vs Serbia ===
The teams recently faced each other in the 2024 FIVB Women's Volleyball Nations League, where the Netherlands won 3–1. This is the fourth game between the Netherlands and Serbia in the World Championship. Serbia won two of their previous meetings in 2014 and the semifinals of 2018, while the Netherlands won their second meeting in the second round of 2018. Prior to 1994, the former Yugoslavia defeated the Netherlands in 1978.

29 August 2025; 17:00	**Netherlands**	**3–2**	Serbia	Indoor Stadium Huamark, Bangkok; Attendance: 2,792; Referees: Karina Noemi Rene (ARG), Joo-Hee Kang (KOR)
29 August 2025; 17:00	(27–25, 26–24, 22–25, 20–25, 15–11); P2 Report			Indoor Stadium Huamark, Bangkok; Attendance: 2,792; Referees: Karina Noemi Rene (ARG), Joo-Hee Kang (KOR)
29 August 2025; 17:00	**Scoring leaders**			Indoor Stadium Huamark, Bangkok; Attendance: 2,792; Referees: Karina Noemi Rene (ARG), Joo-Hee Kang (KOR)
**Daalderop (19/69)**		**Total**	**Uzelac (31/109)**
Daalderop (17/50)		**Attack**	Uzelac (28/71)
Stuut (4/16)		**Block**	Aleksić (6/20)
Stuut (1/15)		**Serve**	Bukilić (3/18)

=== Japan vs Thailand ===
The teams recently faced each other in the 2025 FIVB Women's Volleyball Nations League, where Japan won 3–2. This is the first game between Japan and Thailand in the World Championship.

29 August 2025; 20:30	**Japan**	**3–0**	Thailand	Indoor Stadium Huamark, Bangkok; Attendance: 5,817; Referees: Ivaylo Ivanov (BUL), Ksenija Jurkovic (CRO)
29 August 2025; 20:30	(25–20, 25–23, 25–23); P2 Report			Indoor Stadium Huamark, Bangkok; Attendance: 5,817; Referees: Ivaylo Ivanov (BUL), Ksenija Jurkovic (CRO)
29 August 2025; 20:30	**Scoring leaders**			Indoor Stadium Huamark, Bangkok; Attendance: 5,817; Referees: Ivaylo Ivanov (BUL), Ksenija Jurkovic (CRO)
**Ishikawa (14/54)**		**Total**	**M. Chatchu-on (12/42)**
Ishikawa (13/38)		**Attack**	M. Chatchu-on (10/28)
Shimamura (1/17)		**Block**	K. Pimpichaya (2/5)
Shimamura (2/15)		**Serve**	M. Chatchu-on (1/10)

=== Italy vs Germany ===
The teams recently faced each other in the 2025 FIVB Women's Volleyball Nations League, where Italy won 3–2. This is the fourth game between Italy and Germany in the World Championship. Italy has won all three of their previous meetings in 2002, 2010, and 2014. Prior to 1994, the former West Germany defeated Italy in 1978.

30 August 2025; 17:00	**Italy**	**3–0**	Germany	Indoor Stadium Huamark, Bangkok; Attendance: 3,312; Referees: Yuliya Akulova (KAZ), Agnieszka Michlic (POL)
30 August 2025; 17:00	(25–22, 25–18, 25–11); P2 Report			Indoor Stadium Huamark, Bangkok; Attendance: 3,312; Referees: Yuliya Akulova (KAZ), Agnieszka Michlic (POL)
30 August 2025; 17:00	**Scoring leaders**			Indoor Stadium Huamark, Bangkok; Attendance: 3,312; Referees: Yuliya Akulova (KAZ), Agnieszka Michlic (POL)
**Egonu (21/51)**		**Total**	**Alsmeier (10/44)**
Egonu (16/35)		**Attack**	Alsmeier (10/30)
Egonu (4/10)		**Block**	Cekulaev (2/10)
Fahr (1/11)		**Serve**

=== Poland vs Belgium ===
The teams recently faced each other in the 2025 FIVB Women's Volleyball Nations League, where Poland won 3–0. This is the first game between Poland and Belgium in the World Championship.

30 August 2025; 20:30	**Poland**	**3–2**	Belgium	Indoor Stadium Huamark, Bangkok; Attendance: 3,621; Referees: Joo-Hee Kang (KOR), Sasiprapa Pimthongkhonbur (THA)
30 August 2025; 20:30	(25–27, 25–20, 25–17, 22–25, 15–10); P2 Report			Indoor Stadium Huamark, Bangkok; Attendance: 3,621; Referees: Joo-Hee Kang (KOR), Sasiprapa Pimthongkhonbur (THA)
30 August 2025; 20:30	**Scoring leaders**			Indoor Stadium Huamark, Bangkok; Attendance: 3,621; Referees: Joo-Hee Kang (KOR), Sasiprapa Pimthongkhonbur (THA)
**Łukasik (20/57)**		**Total**	**Herbots (23/79)**
Łukasik (17/39)		**Attack**	Herbots (21/60)
Korneluk (5/21)		**Block**	Van Sas (3/8)
Smarzek (2/9)		**Serve**	Van Sas (5/18)

=== China vs France ===
The teams recently faced each other in the 2025 FIVB Women's Volleyball Nations League, where China won 3–0. This is the first game between China and France in the World Championship.

31 August 2025; 17:00	China	**1–3**	**France**	Indoor Stadium Huamark, Bangkok; Attendance: 2,549; Referees: Ksenija Jurkovic (CRO), Yuliya Akulova (KAZ)
31 August 2025; 17:00	(20–25, 25–27, 25–22, 20–25); P2 Report			Indoor Stadium Huamark, Bangkok; Attendance: 2,549; Referees: Ksenija Jurkovic (CRO), Yuliya Akulova (KAZ)
31 August 2025; 17:00	**Scoring leaders**			Indoor Stadium Huamark, Bangkok; Attendance: 2,549; Referees: Ksenija Jurkovic (CRO), Yuliya Akulova (KAZ)
**Wang Y.Y. (15/45)**		**Total**	**Cazaute (23/85)**
Wang Y.Y. (13/15)		**Attack**	Cazaute (20/50)
Gao Y. (2/14)		**Block**	Sylves (2/11)
Li Yingying (2/13)		**Serve**	Cazaute (2/28)

=== Brazil vs Dominican Republic ===
The teams recently faced each other in the 2025 FIVB Women's Volleyball Nations League, where Brazil won 3–0. This is the fourth game between Brazil and the Dominican Republic in the World Championship. Brazil has won all three of their previous meetings in 1998, 2014, and 2018.

31 August 2025; 20:30	**Brazil**	**3–1**	Dominican Republic	Indoor Stadium Huamark, Bangkok; Attendance: 4,526; Referees: Agnieszka Michlic (POL), Karina Noemi Rene (ARG)
31 August 2025; 20:30	(18–25, 25–12, 25–20, 25–12); P2 Report			Indoor Stadium Huamark, Bangkok; Attendance: 4,526; Referees: Agnieszka Michlic (POL), Karina Noemi Rene (ARG)
31 August 2025; 20:30	**Scoring leaders**			Indoor Stadium Huamark, Bangkok; Attendance: 4,526; Referees: Agnieszka Michlic (POL), Karina Noemi Rene (ARG)
**Gabi (21/61)**		**Total**	**Ga. González (15/50)**
Gabi (17/32)		**Attack**	Ga. González (13/36)
Diana (5/19)		**Block**	Ge. González (3/15)
Roberta (3/26)		**Serve**	Martínez (1/14)

=== United States vs Canada ===
The teams recently faced each other in the 2025 FIVB Women's Volleyball Nations League, where the United States won 3–2. This is the third game between the United States and Canada in the World Championship with each team having won once — Canada in 1974 and the United States in 2022.

1 September 2025; 17:00	**United States**	**3–0**	Canada	Indoor Stadium Huamark, Bangkok; Attendance: 1,570; Referees: Ivaylo Ivanov (BUL), Joo-Hee Kang (KOR)
1 September 2025; 17:00	(25–18, 25–21, 25–21); P2 Report			Indoor Stadium Huamark, Bangkok; Attendance: 1,570; Referees: Ivaylo Ivanov (BUL), Joo-Hee Kang (KOR)
1 September 2025; 17:00	**Scoring leaders**			Indoor Stadium Huamark, Bangkok; Attendance: 1,570; Referees: Ivaylo Ivanov (BUL), Joo-Hee Kang (KOR)
**Franklin (13/42)**		**Total**	**Smrek (12/38)**
A. Skinner (12/23)		**Attack**	Smrek (8/24)
Franklin (3/6)		**Block**	Smrek (3/7)
M. Skinner (1/12)		**Serve**	Maglio (1/11)

=== Turkey vs Slovenia ===
The teams recently faced each other in the 2014 Women's European Volleyball League, where Turkey won 3–0 in two matches. This is the first game between Turkey and Slovenia in the World Championship.

1 September 2025; 20:30	**Turkey**	**3–0**	Slovenia	Indoor Stadium Huamark, Bangkok; Attendance: 2,098; Referees: Karina Noemi Rene (ARG), Ksenija Jurkovic (CRO)
1 September 2025; 20:30	(30–28, 25–13, 29–27); P2 Report			Indoor Stadium Huamark, Bangkok; Attendance: 2,098; Referees: Karina Noemi Rene (ARG), Ksenija Jurkovic (CRO)
1 September 2025; 20:30	**Scoring leaders**			Indoor Stadium Huamark, Bangkok; Attendance: 2,098; Referees: Karina Noemi Rene (ARG), Ksenija Jurkovic (CRO)
**Vargas (20/50)**		**Total**	**Sillah (15/58)**
Vargas (19/35)		**Attack**	Zatkovič (14/26)
Erdem (2/15)		**Block**	Milošič (3/13)
Güneş (3/17)		**Serve**	Sillah (2/9)

== Quarterfinals ==
The following quarterfinals matches were played at the Indoor Stadium Huamark, Bangkok.

=== Netherlands vs Japan ===
The teams recently faced each other in the 2025 FIVB Women's Volleyball Nations League, where Japan won 3–0. This is the seventh game between the Netherlands and Japan in the World Championship. Japan has won four of their previous meetings in 1970, the first round of 1998, 2006, and 2022. Meanwhile, the Netherlands won the remaining two in the 5th–8th semifinals of 1998 and the first round of 2018.

3 September 2025; 17:00	Netherlands	**2–3**	**Japan**	Indoor Stadium Huamark, Bangkok; Attendance: 3,320; Referees: Agnieszka Michlic (POL), Karina Noemi Rene (ARG)
3 September 2025; 17:00	(25–20, 20–25, 25–22, 22–25, 12–15); P2 Report			Indoor Stadium Huamark, Bangkok; Attendance: 3,320; Referees: Agnieszka Michlic (POL), Karina Noemi Rene (ARG)
3 September 2025; 17:00	**Scoring leaders**			Indoor Stadium Huamark, Bangkok; Attendance: 3,320; Referees: Agnieszka Michlic (POL), Karina Noemi Rene (ARG)
**Dambrink (19/62)**		**Total**	**Wada (27/76)**
Dambrink (17/37)		**Attack**	Wada (23/56)
Timmerman (6/22)		**Block**	Ishikawa (2/9)
Timmerman (2/17)		**Serve**	Wada (4/17)

=== Italy vs Poland ===
The teams recently faced each other in the semifinals of the 2025 FIVB Women's Volleyball Nations League, where Italy won 3–0. This is the second game between Italy and Poland in the World Championship with Italy winning in their first meeting 3–0 in the second round of 2006.

3 September 2025; 20:30	**Italy**	**3–0**	Poland	Indoor Stadium Huamark, Bangkok; Attendance: 4,328; Referees: Yuliya Akulova (KAZ), Ivaylo Ivanov (BUL)
3 September 2025; 20:30	(25–17, 25–21, 25–18); P2 Report			Indoor Stadium Huamark, Bangkok; Attendance: 4,328; Referees: Yuliya Akulova (KAZ), Ivaylo Ivanov (BUL)
3 September 2025; 20:30	**Scoring leaders**			Indoor Stadium Huamark, Bangkok; Attendance: 4,328; Referees: Yuliya Akulova (KAZ), Ivaylo Ivanov (BUL)
**Egonu (20/45)**		**Total**	**Stysiak (15/48)**
Egonu (19/31)		**Attack**	Stysiak (12/32)
Fahr (4/15)		**Block**	Stysiak (3/8)
		**Serve**	Wenerska (1/9)

=== Brazil vs France ===
The teams recently faced each other in the pool phase of this tournament, where Brazil won 3–2. This is the third game between Brazil and France in the World Championship with Brazil winning in their first meeting in 1956.

4 September 2025; 17:00	**Brazil**	**3–0**	France	Indoor Stadium Huamark, Bangkok; Attendance: 3,348; Referees: Joo-Hee Kang (KOR), Yuliya Akulova (KAZ)
4 September 2025; 17:00	(27–25, 33–31, 25–19); P2 Report			Indoor Stadium Huamark, Bangkok; Attendance: 3,348; Referees: Joo-Hee Kang (KOR), Yuliya Akulova (KAZ)
4 September 2025; 17:00	**Scoring leaders**			Indoor Stadium Huamark, Bangkok; Attendance: 3,348; Referees: Joo-Hee Kang (KOR), Yuliya Akulova (KAZ)
**Bergmann (17/53)**		**Total**	**Cazaute (20/59)**
Bergmann (17/35)		**Attack**	Cazaute (18/41)
Diana (5/17)		**Block**	Gicquel (1/1)
Gabi (1/22)		**Serve**	Stojiljković (1/8)

=== United States vs Turkey ===
The teams recently faced each other in the 2024 FIVB Women's Volleyball Nations League, where Turkey won 3–2. This is the sixth game between the United States and Turkey in the World Championship. The United States has won all five of their previous meetings in 2006, 2014, 2018, and both the second round and the quarterfinals of 2022.

4 September 2025; 20:30	United States	**1–3**	**Turkey**	Indoor Stadium Huamark, Bangkok; Attendance: 2,748; Referees: Ksenija Jurcovic (CRO), Sasiprapa Pimthongkhonburi (THA)
4 September 2025; 20:30	(14–25, 25–22, 14–25, 23–25); P2 Report			Indoor Stadium Huamark, Bangkok; Attendance: 2,748; Referees: Ksenija Jurcovic (CRO), Sasiprapa Pimthongkhonburi (THA)
4 September 2025; 20:30	**Scoring leaders**			Indoor Stadium Huamark, Bangkok; Attendance: 2,748; Referees: Ksenija Jurcovic (CRO), Sasiprapa Pimthongkhonburi (THA)
**Franklin (12/46)**		**Total**	**Karakurt (23/61)**
A. Skinner (11/43)		**Attack**	Karakurt (20/37)
Ogbogu (5/11)		**Block**	Erdem (7/16)
Rettke (3/17)		**Serve**	Vargas (3/18)

== Semifinals ==
The following semifinals matches will be played at the Indoor Stadium Huamark, Bangkok.

=== Japan vs Turkey ===
The teams recently faced each other in the quarterfinals of the 2025 FIVB Women's Volleyball Nations League, where Japan won 3–2. This is the third game between Japan and Turkey in the World Championship. Japan has won both of their previous meetings in 2006 and 2010.

6 September 2025; 15:30	Japan	**1–3**	**Turkey**	Indoor Stadium Huamark, Bangkok; Attendance: 5,579; Referees: Ivaylo Ivanov (BUL), Karina Noemi Rene (ARG)
6 September 2025; 15:30	(25–16, 17–25, 18–25, 25–27); P2 Report			Indoor Stadium Huamark, Bangkok; Attendance: 5,579; Referees: Ivaylo Ivanov (BUL), Karina Noemi Rene (ARG)
6 September 2025; 15:30	**Scoring leaders**			Indoor Stadium Huamark, Bangkok; Attendance: 5,579; Referees: Ivaylo Ivanov (BUL), Karina Noemi Rene (ARG)
**Wada (22/59)**		**Total**	**Vargas (28/60)**
Wada (19/38)		**Attack**	Vargas (26/40)
Shimamura (3/10)		**Block**	Erdem (4/16)
Ishikawa (2/16)		**Serve**	Güneş (2/18)

=== Italy vs Brazil ===
The teams recently faced each other in the final match of the 2025 FIVB Women's Volleyball Nations League, where Italy won 3–1. This is the sixth game between Italy and Brazil in the World Championship. Brazil has won all five of their previous meetings in 1990, 2010, 2014, and both the second round and the semifinals of 2022.

6 September 2025; 19:30	**Italy**	**3–2**	Brazil	Indoor Stadium Huamark, Bangkok; Attendance: 5,683; Referees: Agnieszka Michlic (POL), Yuliya Akulova (KAZ)
6 September 2025; 19:30	(22–25, 25–22, 28–30, 25–22, 15–13); P2 Report			Indoor Stadium Huamark, Bangkok; Attendance: 5,683; Referees: Agnieszka Michlic (POL), Yuliya Akulova (KAZ)
6 September 2025; 19:30	**Scoring leaders**			Indoor Stadium Huamark, Bangkok; Attendance: 5,683; Referees: Agnieszka Michlic (POL), Yuliya Akulova (KAZ)
**Antropova (28/79)**		**Total**	**Gabi (29/94)**
Antropova (20/53)		**Attack**	Gabi (27/63)
Antropova (6/12)		**Block**	Júlia (9/25)
Antropova (2/14)		**Serve**	Rosamaria (1/17)

== Third place match ==
The teams recently faced each other in the semifinals of the 2025 FIVB Women's Volleyball Nations League, where Brazil won 3–2. This was the twelfth game between Japan and Brazil in the World Championship. Brazil has won seven of their previous meetings in 1986, 1990, 1994, 1998, 2010, 2018, and the quarterfinals of 2022, while Japan won the remaining four in 1960, 1962, 1982, and the first round of 2022.

7 September 2025; 15:30	Japan	**2–3**	**Brazil**	Indoor Stadium Huamark, Bangkok; Attendance: 5,717; Referees: Ivaylo Ivanov (BUL), Ksenija Jurcovic (CRO)
7 September 2025; 15:30	(12–25, 17–25, 25–19, 29–27, 16–18); P2 Report			Indoor Stadium Huamark, Bangkok; Attendance: 5,717; Referees: Ivaylo Ivanov (BUL), Ksenija Jurcovic (CRO)
7 September 2025; 15:30	**Scoring leaders**			Indoor Stadium Huamark, Bangkok; Attendance: 5,717; Referees: Ivaylo Ivanov (BUL), Ksenija Jurcovic (CRO)
**Yoshino (34/77)**		**Total**	**Gabi (35/87)**
Yoshino (29/56)		**Attack**	Gabi (33/63)
Yamada (2/6)		**Block**	Júlia (4/20)
Yoshino (3/17)		**Serve**	Roberta (2/19)

== Final ==
The teams recently faced each other in the 2025 FIVB Women's Volleyball Nations League, where Italy won 3–2. This is the fourth game between Turkey and Italy in the World Championship. Italy has won all three of their previous meetings in 2006, 2010, and 2018.

7 September 2025; 19:30	Turkey	**2–3**	**Italy**	Indoor Stadium Huamark, Bangkok; Attendance: 5,719; Referees: Karina Noemi Rene (ARG), Joo-Hee Kang (KOR)
7 September 2025; 19:30	(23–25, 25–13, 24–26, 25–19, 8–15); P2 Report			Indoor Stadium Huamark, Bangkok; Attendance: 5,719; Referees: Karina Noemi Rene (ARG), Joo-Hee Kang (KOR)
7 September 2025; 19:30	**Scoring leaders**			Indoor Stadium Huamark, Bangkok; Attendance: 5,719; Referees: Karina Noemi Rene (ARG), Joo-Hee Kang (KOR)
**Vargas (33/95)**		**Total**	**Egonu (22/77)**
Vargas (28/69)		**Attack**	Egonu (18/58)
Erdem (3/17)		**Block**	Sylla (4/11)
Vargas (4/20)		**Serve**	Egonu (1/8)
