= 2025 FIVB Women's Volleyball World Championship Pool E =

Pool E is one of eight pools of the preliminary round of the 2025 FIVB Women's Volleyball World Championship. The pool consists of Turkey as well as Canada, Bulgaria, and Spain. Teams are playing one another in a round-robin, where the top two teams advancing to the final round.

It is currently taking place from 23 to 27 August 2025, with rest days on 24 and 26 August. Each matchday features two games, held at 16:00 and 19:30. As the seeded team, Turkey would play at 19:30 in the first two matches, except for the final match against Canada, which would be played at 16:00 due to a broadcast time conflict with the China vs. Dominican Republic match in Pool F.

== Teams ==
The following four teams are competing in Pool E for the tournament, listed by their position in the pool.

Position	Country	Confederation	Qualified as	Qualified on	Previous appearances			Previous best performance
Position	Country	Confederation	Qualified as	Qualified on	Total	First	Last	Previous best performance
E1	Turkey^{a}	CEV	2023 European champions	30 August 2023	5	2006	2022	6th place (2010)
E2	Canada	NORCECA	2023 NORCECA 3rd placers	3 September 2023	10	1974	2022	10th place (2022)
E3	Bulgaria	CEV	8th World ranked non-qualified team	30 August 2024	13	1952	2022	4th place (1952)
E4	Spain	CEV	14th World ranked non-qualified team	30 August 2024	1	1982		20th place (1982)

Notes
^{a} Designated as Türkiye by the FIVB

== World Rankings ==
The following four teams are ranked in the FIVB World Rankings at the draw, the beginning and the final day of the tournament.

Position	Country	FIVB World Rankings		
Position	Country	Draw^{α}	Before^{β}	After^{γ}
E1	Turkey	4 (352.61)	6 (337.60)	3 (368.09)
E2	Canada	8 (284.76)	12 (238.63)	12 (230.99)
E3	Bulgaria	20 (153.92)	20 (163.03)	25 (144.25)
E4	Spain	29 (123.31)	31 (119.61)	30 (130.15)

Notes
^{α} The FIVB World Ranking at the end of August 2024.
^{β} The FIVB World Ranking before the first game on 22 August 2025.
^{γ} The FIVB World Ranking after the final game on 7 September 2025.

== Standings ==
The following four teams are ranked based on the pool standing procedure.

Pos	Team	Pld	W	L	Pts	SW	SL	SR	SPW	SPL	SPR	Qualification
1	Turkey	3	3	0	9	9	0	MAX	227	175	1.297	Final round
2	Canada	3	2	1	5	6	6	1.000	271	263	1.030	Final round
3	Spain	3	1	2	4	5	7	0.714	260	268	0.970	
4	Bulgaria	3	0	3	0	2	9	0.222	218	270	0.807	

Source: FIVB Women's World Championship - Standings
Rules for classification: Pool standing procedure
- The winners of Pool E will advance to play the runners-up of Pool D.
- The runners-up of Pool E will advance to play the winners of Pool D.

== Matches ==
The following six matches of Pool D will play at the Korat Chatchai Hall, Nakhon Ratchasima.

=== Canada vs Bulgaria ===
The teams recently faced each other in the 2025 FIVB Women's Volleyball Nations League, where Canada won 3–2. This is the seventh game between Canada and Bulgaria in the World Championship. Bulgaria has won four of the previous meetings in 1982, 1986, 2014, and 2018, while Canada has won two in 1974 and 2022.

23 August 2025; 16:00	Canada	3–1	Bulgaria	Korat Chatchai Hall, Nakhon Ratchasima; Attendance: 2,891; Referees: Angela Grass (BRA), Yuliya Akulova (KAZ)
23 August 2025; 16:00	(25–23, 25–18, 23–25, 25–18); P2 Report			Korat Chatchai Hall, Nakhon Ratchasima; Attendance: 2,891; Referees: Angela Grass (BRA), Yuliya Akulova (KAZ)
23 August 2025; 16:00	Scoring leaders			Korat Chatchai Hall, Nakhon Ratchasima; Attendance: 2,891; Referees: Angela Grass (BRA), Yuliya Akulova (KAZ)
Mitrovic (17/65)		Total	Stoyanova (15/64)
Mitrovic (16/38)		Attack	Stoyanova (12/38)
Peland (3/8)		Block	Vuchkova (3/19)
Smrek (2/16)		Serve	Stoyanova (1/14)

=== Turkey vs Spain ===
The teams recently faced each other in the 2013 Women's European Volleyball Championship, where Turkey won 3–0. They also met in the 2022 Mediterranean Games, with Turkey winning 3–1, but Turkey did not use the same squad as in the FIVB world tournaments. This is the first game between Turkey and Spain in the World Championship.

23 August 2025; 19:30	Turkey	3–0	Spain	Korat Chatchai Hall, Nakhon Ratchasima; Attendance: 3,800; Referees: Sumie Myoi (JPN), Wael Kandil (EGY)
23 August 2025; 19:30	(25–18, 25–20, 25–23); P2 Report			Korat Chatchai Hall, Nakhon Ratchasima; Attendance: 3,800; Referees: Sumie Myoi (JPN), Wael Kandil (EGY)
23 August 2025; 19:30	Scoring leaders			Korat Chatchai Hall, Nakhon Ratchasima; Attendance: 3,800; Referees: Sumie Myoi (JPN), Wael Kandil (EGY)
Erkek (15/43)		Total	Escamilla (13/35)
Erkek (11/19)		Attack	Escamilla (13/23)
Kısal (2/7)		Block	Hernández (1/8)
Erkek (2/18)		Serve	De Paula (2/10)

=== Canada vs Spain ===
The teams recently faced each other in the 1991 FIVB Volleyball Women's World Cup, where Canada won 3–1. This is the first game between Canada and Spain in the World Championship.

25 August 2025; 16:00	Canada	3–2	Spain	Korat Chatchai Hall, Nakhon Ratchasima; Attendance: 1,500; Referees: Angela Grass (BRA), Wael Kandil (EGY)
25 August 2025; 16:00	(22–25, 28–26, 24–26, 25–16, 15–10); P2 Report			Korat Chatchai Hall, Nakhon Ratchasima; Attendance: 1,500; Referees: Angela Grass (BRA), Wael Kandil (EGY)
25 August 2025; 16:00	Scoring leaders			Korat Chatchai Hall, Nakhon Ratchasima; Attendance: 1,500; Referees: Angela Grass (BRA), Wael Kandil (EGY)
Mitrovic (22/73)		Total	Valera (16/48)
Mitrovic (20/45)		Attack	Segura (12/44)
Thokbuom (4/17)		Block	Hernández (3/15)
Thokbuom (1/17)		Serve	Hernández (1/22)

=== Turkey vs Bulgaria ===
The teams recently faced each other in the 2023 FIVB Volleyball Women's Olympic Qualification Tournaments, where Turkey won 3–0. This is the third game between Turkey and Bulgaria in the World Championship with each team having won once — Bulgaria in 2014 and Turkey in 2018.

25 August 2025; 19:30	Turkey	3–0	Bulgaria	Korat Chatchai Hall, Nakhon Ratchasima; Attendance: 1,923; Referees: Sumie Myoi (JPN), Yuliya Akulova (KAZ)
25 August 2025; 19:30	(25–23, 25–19, 25–13); P2 Report			Korat Chatchai Hall, Nakhon Ratchasima; Attendance: 1,923; Referees: Sumie Myoi (JPN), Yuliya Akulova (KAZ)
25 August 2025; 19:30	Scoring leaders			Korat Chatchai Hall, Nakhon Ratchasima; Attendance: 1,923; Referees: Sumie Myoi (JPN), Yuliya Akulova (KAZ)
Vargas (20/40)		Total	Milanova (11/35)
Vargas (19/28)		Attack	Milanova (11/23)
Güneş (5/10)		Block	Dimitrova (2/2)
Kısal (1/11)		Serve	Stoyanova (1/14)

=== Turkey vs Canada ===
The teams recently faced each other in the 2025 FIVB Women's Volleyball Nations League, where Turkey won 3–0. This is the fifth game between Turkey and Canada in the World Championship. Turkey has won all four of their previous encounters in four consecutive years: 2010, 2014, 2018, and 2022.

27 August 2025; 16:00	Turkey	3–0	Canada	Korat Chatchai Hall, Nakhon Ratchasima; Attendance: 2,709; Referees: Sonja Simonovska (MNE), Denny Francisco Cespedes Lassi (DOM)
27 August 2025; 16:00	(25–21, 27–25, 25–13); P2 Report			Korat Chatchai Hall, Nakhon Ratchasima; Attendance: 2,709; Referees: Sonja Simonovska (MNE), Denny Francisco Cespedes Lassi (DOM)
27 August 2025; 16:00	Scoring leaders			Korat Chatchai Hall, Nakhon Ratchasima; Attendance: 2,709; Referees: Sonja Simonovska (MNE), Denny Francisco Cespedes Lassi (DOM)
Vargas (16/49)		Total	Thokbuom (12/37)
Vargas (14/30)		Attack	Thokbuom (8/15)
Erdem (3/13)		Block	Thokbuom (2/8)
Erdem (1/10)		Serve	Thokbuom (2/14)

=== Bulgaria vs Spain ===
The teams recently faced each other in the 2021 Women's European Volleyball Championship, where Bulgaria won 3–0. This is the second game between Bulgaria and Spain in the World Championship with Bulgaria winning in their first meeting in 1982.

27 August 2025; 19:30	Bulgaria	1–3	Spain	Korat Chatchai Hall, Nakhon Ratchasima; Attendance: 3,564; Referees: Kandil Wael (EGY), Myoi Sumie (JPN)
27 August 2025; 19:30	(22–25, 14–25, 25–22, 18–25); P2 Report			Korat Chatchai Hall, Nakhon Ratchasima; Attendance: 3,564; Referees: Kandil Wael (EGY), Myoi Sumie (JPN)
27 August 2025; 19:30	Scoring leaders			Korat Chatchai Hall, Nakhon Ratchasima; Attendance: 3,564; Referees: Kandil Wael (EGY), Myoi Sumie (JPN)
Paskova (15/53)		Total	Segura (17/56)
Paskova (13/34)		Attack	Segura (14/33)
Vuchkova (4/17)		Block	Varela (5/13)
Dimitrova (2/16)		Serve	Hernández (3/21)
