= 2025 FIVB Men's Volleyball World Championship final =

- The SM Mall of Asia Arena in Pasay City hosted the match
- Event: 2025 FIVB Men's Volleyball World Championship
Bulgaria	Italy
(Bulgaria)	(Italy)
1	3
Head coach: Gianlorenzo Blengini (ITA)	Head coach: Ferdinando De Giorgi (ITA)
- Italy won in four sets
	1	2	3	4
Bulgaria	21	17	25	10
Italy	25	25	17	25
- Date: 28 September 2025
- Venue: SM Mall of Asia Arena in Pasay
- Referees: Simonovic Vladimir (SUI), Mokry Juraj (SVK)

The 2025 FIVB Men's Volleyball World Championship final was the final match of the 2025 FIVB Men's Volleyball World Championship, the 21st edition of FIVB's competition for men's national volleyball teams. The match was played at the SM Mall of Asia Arena in Pasay, Metro Manila, Philippines, on 28 September 2025, between Bulgaria and Italy.

== Background ==
Italy are the defending champions having won the 2022 edition. The four-time champions also won three-consecutive titles; in 1990, 1994, and 1998. For Bulgaria, this is their first finals appearance since the 1970 edition.

Italy's only defeat in the tournament was to Belgium in the group stage while Bulgaria has won all of their games prior to the final.

Italy was ranked 2nd, while Bulgaria came in 9th.

== Route to the final ==
Bulgaria
Round
Italy
Opponent
Result
Preliminary round
Opponent
Result
Germany
0–3
Match 1
Algeria
3–0
Slovenia
2–3
Match 2
Belgium
2–3
Chile
3–0
Match 3
Ukraine
3–0

Pos	Team	Pld	Pts
1	Bulgaria	3	8
2	Slovenia	3	7
3	Germany	3	3
4	Chile	3	0

Source: FIVB Men's World Championship - Standings
winner
Final standings

Pos	Team	Pld	Pts
1	Belgium	3	8
2	Italy	3	7
3	Ukraine	3	3
4	Algeria	3	0

Source: FIVB Men's World Championship - Standings
runner-up
Opponent
Result
Final round
Opponent
Result
Portugal
3–0
Round of 16
Argentina
3–0
United States
3–2
Quarterfinals
Belgium
3–0
Czech Republic
3–1
Semifinals
Poland
3–0

== Match details ==
The final held on 28 September 2025 at the Mall of Asia Arena in Pasay was attended by 16,429 people and became the most attended men's volleyball match in the Philippines. Italy won the final after four sets, with Bulgaria stealing the third set.

28 September 2025; 18:30	Bulgaria	1–3	Italy	SM Mall of Asia Arena, Pasay City; Attendance: 16,429; Referees: Vladimir Simonovic (SUI), Juraj Mokry (SVK)
28 September 2025; 18:30	(21–25, 17–25, 25–17, 10–25); P2 Report			SM Mall of Asia Arena, Pasay City; Attendance: 16,429; Referees: Vladimir Simonovic (SUI), Juraj Mokry (SVK)
28 September 2025; 18:30	Scoring leaders			SM Mall of Asia Arena, Pasay City; Attendance: 16,429; Referees: Vladimir Simonovic (SUI), Juraj Mokry (SVK)
A. Nikolov (23/56)		Total	Romanò (22/47)
A. Nikolov (21/36)		Attack	Romanò (16/23)
Grozdanov (1/11)		Block	Russo (2/8)
Atanasov (2/12)		Serve	Bottolo (7/25)

== See also ==
- 2025 FIVB Women's Volleyball World Championship final
