= 2025 FIVB Women's Volleyball World Championship Pool F =

Pool F was one of eight pools of the preliminary round of the 2025 FIVB Women's Volleyball World Championship. The pool consisted of China as well as the Dominican Republic, Colombia, and Mexico. Teams are playinh one another in a round-robin, where the top two teams advancing to the final round.

It took place from 23 to 27 August 2025, with rest days on 24 and 26 August. Each matchday features two games, held at 16:00 and 19:30. As the seeded team, China would play all its matches at 19:30.

== Teams ==
The following four teams are competing in Pool F for the tournament, listed by their position in the pool.

Position	Country	Confederation	Qualified as	Qualified on	Previous appearances			Previous best performance
Position	Country	Confederation	Qualified as	Qualified on	Total	First	Last	Previous best performance
F1	China	AVC	2023 Asian runners-up	5 September 2023	15	1956	2022	Champions (1982, 1986)
F2	Dominican Republic	NORCECA	2023 NORCECA champions	2 September 2023	9	1974	2022	5th place (2014)
F3	Colombia	CSV	2023 South American 3rd placers	22 August 2023	1	2022		21st place (2022)
F4	Mexico	NORCECA	11th World ranked non-qualified team	30 August 2024	8	1970	2018	10th place (1974)

== World Rankings ==
The following four teams are ranked in the FIVB World Rankings at the draw, the beginning and the final day of the tournament.

Position	Country	FIVB World Rankings		
Position	Country	Draw^{α}	Before^{β}	After^{γ}
F1	China	5 (350.30)	4 (348.60)	6 (337.02)
F2	Dominican Republic	11 (260.54)	10 (248.35)	11 (254.68)
F3	Colombia	21 (152.37)	19 (172.34)	22 (157.31)
F4	Mexico	25 (138.42)	24 (150.55)	23 (152.56)

Notes
^{α} The FIVB World Ranking at the end of August 2024.
^{β} The FIVB World Ranking before the first game on 22 August 2025.
^{γ} The FIVB World Ranking after the final game on 7 September 2025.

== Standings ==
The following four teams are ranked based on the pool standing procedure.

Pos	Team	Pld	W	L	Pts	SW	SL	SR	SPW	SPL	SPR	Qualification
1	China	3	3	0	9	9	2	4.500	271	201	1.348	Final round
2	Dominican Republic	3	2	1	6	6	3	2.000	203	173	1.173	Final round
3	Mexico	3	1	2	2	4	8	0.500	234	280	0.836	
4	Colombia	3	0	3	1	3	9	0.333	224	278	0.806	

Source: FIVB Women's World Championship - Standings
Rules for classification: Pool standing procedure
- The winners of Pool F will advance to play the runners-up of Pool C.
- The runners-up of Pool F will advance to play the winners of Pool C.

== Matches ==
The following six matches of Pool C will play at the Chiang Mai International Exhibition and Convention Centre, Chiang Mai.

=== Dominican Republic vs Colombia ===
The teams recently faced each other twice in the 2025 Women's Pan-American Volleyball Cup, where the Dominican Republic won both matches 3–1 and 3–0. This is the first game between the Dominican Republic and Colombia in the World Championship.

23 August 2025; 16:00	Dominican Republic	3–0	Colombia	CMECC, Chiang Mai; Attendance: 1,781; Referees: Ksenija Jurkovic (CRO), Lourdes Perez Perez (CUB)
23 August 2025; 16:00	(25–15, 25–18, 25–13); P2 Report			CMECC, Chiang Mai; Attendance: 1,781; Referees: Ksenija Jurkovic (CRO), Lourdes Perez Perez (CUB)
23 August 2025; 16:00	Scoring leaders			CMECC, Chiang Mai; Attendance: 1,781; Referees: Ksenija Jurkovic (CRO), Lourdes Perez Perez (CUB)
Martínez (20/40)		Total	Olaya (11/38)
Martínez (17/28)		Attack	Olaya (11/27)
Martínez (3/4)		Block	Rangel (3/9)
Gaila (4/18)		Serve	Marín (1/8)

=== China vs Mexico ===
The teams recently faced each other in the 2023 FIVB Volleyball Women's Olympic Qualification Tournaments, where China won 3–0. This is the second game between China and Mexico in the World Championship with China winning in their first meeting in 2006.

23 August 2025; 19:30	China	3–1	Mexico	CMECC, Chiang Mai; Attendance: 3,090; Referees: Ebrahim Firouzi (IRI), Agnieszka Michlic (POL)
23 August 2025; 19:30	(22–25, 26–24, 25–10, 25–18); P2 Report			CMECC, Chiang Mai; Attendance: 3,090; Referees: Ebrahim Firouzi (IRI), Agnieszka Michlic (POL)
23 August 2025; 19:30	Scoring leaders			CMECC, Chiang Mai; Attendance: 3,090; Referees: Ebrahim Firouzi (IRI), Agnieszka Michlic (POL)
Zhuang Y.S. (23/59)		Total	Maldonado (22/68)
Zhuang Y.S. (20/40)		Attack	Maldonado (21/53)
Wang Y.Y. (4/12)		Block	Urías (2/10)
Gong X.Y. (1/14)		Serve	Parra (1/17)

=== Dominican Republic vs Mexico ===
The teams recently faced each other in the 2025 Women's Pan-American Volleyball Cup, where the Dominican Republic won 3–1. This is the third game between the Dominican Republic and Mexico in the World Championship. The Dominican Republic has won both of their previous meetings in 2006 and 2018.

25 August 2025; 16:00	Dominican Republic	3–0	Mexico	CMECC, Chiang Mai; Attendance: 1,449; Referees: Ksenija Jurkovic (CRO), Lourdes Perez Perez (CUB)
25 August 2025; 16:00	(25–15, 25–17, 25–20); P2 Report			CMECC, Chiang Mai; Attendance: 1,449; Referees: Ksenija Jurkovic (CRO), Lourdes Perez Perez (CUB)
25 August 2025; 16:00	Scoring leaders			CMECC, Chiang Mai; Attendance: 1,449; Referees: Ksenija Jurkovic (CRO), Lourdes Perez Perez (CUB)
B. Martínez (22/50)		Total	Maldonado (13/50)
B. Martínez (18/26)		Attack	Maldonado (13/39)
B. Martínez (3/9)		Block	Urías (2/17)
J. Martínez (1/7)		Serve	Flores (1/5)

=== China vs Colombia ===
The teams recently faced each other in the 2022 FIVB Women's Volleyball World Championship, where China won 3–0. This is the second game between China and Colombia in the World Championship.

25 August 2025; 19:30	China	3–1	Colombia	CMECC, Chiang Mai; Attendance: 3,128; Referees: Ebrahim Firouzi (IRI), Stanislava Simic (SRB)
25 August 2025; 19:30	(25–16, 23–25, 25–14, 25–16); P2 Report			CMECC, Chiang Mai; Attendance: 3,128; Referees: Ebrahim Firouzi (IRI), Stanislava Simic (SRB)
25 August 2025; 19:30	Scoring leaders			CMECC, Chiang Mai; Attendance: 3,128; Referees: Ebrahim Firouzi (IRI), Stanislava Simic (SRB)
Zhuang Y.S. (17/60)		Total	Olaya (21/58)
Gong X.Y. (13/28)		Attack	Olaya (19/43)
Zhuang Y.S. (5/12)		Block	Rangel (3/12)
Gao Y. (1/9)		Serve	Pascua (2/15)

=== Colombia and Mexico ===
The teams recently faced each other in the 2024 Women's Pan-American Volleyball Cup, where Colombia won 3–1. This is the first game between Colombia and Mexico in the World Championship.

27 August 2025; 16:00	Colombia	2–3	Mexico	CMECC, Chiang Mai; Attendance: 1,924; Referees: Paul Catalin Szabo Alexi (ROU), Ebrahim Firouz (IRI)
27 August 2025; 16:00	(22–25, 25–22, 23–25, 25–18, 12–15); P2 Report			CMECC, Chiang Mai; Attendance: 1,924; Referees: Paul Catalin Szabo Alexi (ROU), Ebrahim Firouz (IRI)
27 August 2025; 16:00	Scoring leaders			CMECC, Chiang Mai; Attendance: 1,924; Referees: Paul Catalin Szabo Alexi (ROU), Ebrahim Firouz (IRI)
Olaya (27/83)		Total	Maldonado (34/84)
Olaya (25/61)		Attack	Maldonado (31/59)
Rangel (3/16)		Block	Urías (9/25)
Carabalí (2/15)		Serve	Topete (1/3)

=== China vs Dominican Republic ===
The teams recently faced each other in the 2025 FIVB Women's Volleyball Nations League, where China won 3–2. This is the fifth game between China and the Dominican Republic in the World Championship. China has won all four of their previous meetings in 2006, 2010, and both the second and third rounds of 2014.

27 August 2025; 19:30	China	3–0	Dominican Republic	CMECC, Chiang Mai; Attendance: 3,413; Referees: Ksenija Jurkovic (CRO), Lourdes Perez Perez (CUB)
27 August 2025; 19:30	(25–15, 25–21, 25–17); P2 Report			CMECC, Chiang Mai; Attendance: 3,413; Referees: Ksenija Jurkovic (CRO), Lourdes Perez Perez (CUB)
27 August 2025; 19:30	Scoring leaders			CMECC, Chiang Mai; Attendance: 3,413; Referees: Ksenija Jurkovic (CRO), Lourdes Perez Perez (CUB)
Wu M.J. (16/48)		Total	Martínez (15/46)
Wu M.J. (15/34)		Attack	Tapia (13/33)
Wang Y.Y. (5/22)		Block	Rangel (2/8)
Zhuang Y.S. (1/12)		Serve	González (1/4)
