= 2025 FIVB Women's Volleyball World Championship Pool C =

Pool C was one of eight pools of the preliminary round of the 2025 FIVB Women's Volleyball World Championship. The pool consisted of Brazil as well as Puerto Rico, France, and Greece. Teams played one another in a round-robin, where the top two teams advanced to the final round.

It took place from 22 to 26 August 2025, with rest days on 23 and 25 August. Each matchday featured two games, held at 16:00 and 19:30. As the seeded team, Brazil played all its matches at 19:30.

== Teams ==
The following four teams competed in Pool C for the tournament, listed by their position in the pool.

Position	Country	Confederation	Qualified as	Qualified on	Previous appearances			Previous best performance
Position	Country	Confederation	Qualified as	Qualified on	Total	First	Last	Previous best performance
C1	Brazil	CSV	2023 South American champions	22 August 2023	17	1956	2022	Runners-up (1994, 2006, 2010, 2022)
C2	Puerto Rico	NORCECA	5th World ranked non-qualified team	30 August 2024	8	1974	2022	10th place (2002)
C3	France	CEV	7th World ranked non-qualified team	30 August 2024	3	1952	1974	7th place (1952)
C4	Greece	CEV	15th World ranked non-qualified team	30 August 2024	1	2002		10th place (2002)

== World Rankings ==
The following four teams were ranked in the FIVB World Rankings at the draw, the beginning and the final day of the tournament.

Position	Country	FIVB World Rankings		
Position	Country	Draw^{α}	Before^{β}	After^{γ}
C1	Brazil	2 (407.09)	2 (426.80)	2 (428.00)
C2	Puerto Rico	16 (182.58)	18 (186.34)	19 (163.48)
C3	France	19 (157.50)	15 (192.72)	13 (222.91)
C4	Greece	30 (117.40)	31 (123.08)	29 (131.02)

Notes
^{α} The FIVB World Ranking at the end of August 2024.
^{β} The FIVB World Ranking before the first game on 22 August 2025.
^{γ} The FIVB World Ranking after the final game on 7 September 2025.

== Standings ==
The following four teams were ranked based on the pool standing procedure.

Pos	Team	Pld	W	L	Pts	SW	SL	SR	SPW	SPL	SPR	Qualification
1	Brazil	3	3	0	8	9	2	4.500	256	195	1.313	Final round
2	France	3	2	1	7	8	5	1.600	286	274	1.044	Final round
3	Greece	3	1	2	3	4	7	0.571	237	241	0.983	
4	Puerto Rico	3	0	3	0	2	9	0.222	200	269	0.743	

Source: FIVB Women's World Championship - Standings
Rules for classification: Pool standing procedure

== Matches ==
All times are Thailand Standard Time (UTC+07:00).

The following six matches of Pool C were played at the Chiang Mai International Exhibition and Convention Centre, Chiang Mai.

=== Puerto Rico vs France ===
The teams recently faced each other in the 1974 FIVB Women's Volleyball World Championship, where France won 3–1. This was the second game between Puerto Rico and France in the World Championship.

22 August 2025; 16:00	Puerto Rico	1–3	France	CMECC, Chiang Mai; Attendance: 2,167; Referees: Stanislava Simic (SRB), Ebrahim Firouzi (IRI)
22 August 2025; 16:00	(22–25, 18–25, 25–21, 14–25); P2 Report			CMECC, Chiang Mai; Attendance: 2,167; Referees: Stanislava Simic (SRB), Ebrahim Firouzi (IRI)
22 August 2025; 16:00	Scoring leaders			CMECC, Chiang Mai; Attendance: 2,167; Referees: Stanislava Simic (SRB), Ebrahim Firouzi (IRI)
Vázquez (12/57)		Total	Ndiaye (22/71)
Vázquez (11/37)		Attack	Cazaute (20/44)
Reyes (2/7)		Block	Sylves (5/18)
Rivera (2/13)		Serve	Ndiaye (5/23)

=== Brazil vs Greece ===
The teams recently faced each other in the 2004 Summer Olympics, where Brazil won 3–0. This was the second game between Brazil and Greece in the World Championship with Brazil winning in their first meeting in 2002.

22 August 2025; 19:30	Brazil	3–0	Greece	CMECC, Chiang Mai; Attendance: 2,963; Referees: Paul Catalin Szabo Alexi (ROU), Lourdes Perez Perez (CUB)
22 August 2025; 19:30	(25–18, 25–16, 25–16); P2 Report			CMECC, Chiang Mai; Attendance: 2,963; Referees: Paul Catalin Szabo Alexi (ROU), Lourdes Perez Perez (CUB)
22 August 2025; 19:30	Scoring leaders			CMECC, Chiang Mai; Attendance: 2,963; Referees: Paul Catalin Szabo Alexi (ROU), Lourdes Perez Perez (CUB)
Gabi (18/45)		Total	Anthouli (18/44)
Gabi (16/28)		Attack	Anthouli (17/29)
Júlia (2/9)		Block	Tontai (2/12)
Gabi (2/14)		Serve

=== Puerto Rico vs Greece ===
The teams have never met before. This was the first game between Puerto Rico and Greece in any tournament, including the World Championship.

24 August 2025; 16:00	Puerto Rico	1–3	Greece	CMECC, Chiang Mai; Attendance: 2,426; Referees: Agnieszka Michlic (POL), Lourdes Perez Perez (CUB)
24 August 2025; 16:00	(19–25, 13–25, 25–23, 14–25); P2 Report			CMECC, Chiang Mai; Attendance: 2,426; Referees: Agnieszka Michlic (POL), Lourdes Perez Perez (CUB)
24 August 2025; 16:00	Scoring leaders			CMECC, Chiang Mai; Attendance: 2,426; Referees: Agnieszka Michlic (POL), Lourdes Perez Perez (CUB)
Vázquez (14/50)		Total	Anthouli (27/63)
Vázquez (13/33)		Attack	Anthouli (22/45)
Santiago (2/6)		Block	Anthouli (3/6)
Santiago (1/8)		Serve	Anthouli (2/12)

=== Brazil vs France ===
The teams recently faced each other in the 2025 FIVB Women's Volleyball Nations League, where Brazil won 3–2. This was the second game between Brazil and France in the World Championship, with Brazil winning in their first meeting in 1956.

24 August 2025; 19:30	Brazil	3–2	France	CMECC, Chiang Mai; Attendance: 3,621; Referees: Stanislava Simic (SRB), Paul Catalin Szabo Alexi (ROU)
24 August 2025; 19:30	(21–25, 20–25, 25–15, 25–17, 15–13); P2 Report			CMECC, Chiang Mai; Attendance: 3,621; Referees: Stanislava Simic (SRB), Paul Catalin Szabo Alexi (ROU)
24 August 2025; 19:30	Scoring leaders			CMECC, Chiang Mai; Attendance: 3,621; Referees: Stanislava Simic (SRB), Paul Catalin Szabo Alexi (ROU)
Gabi (18/63)		Total	Cazaute (20/60)
Bergmann (14/31)		Attack	Cazaute (19/43)
Gabi (5/10)		Block	Sylves (3/10)
Bergmann (1/17)		Serve	Ndiaye (3/16)

=== France vs Greece ===
The teams recently faced each other in the 2019 Women's European Volleyball Championship, where Greece won 3–0. This was the first game between France and Greece in the World Championship.

26 August 2025; 16:00	France	3–1	Greece	CMECC, Chiang Mai; Attendance: 1,631; Referees: Stanislava Simic (SRB), Ksenija Jurkovic (CRO)
26 August 2025; 16:00	(17–25, 25–21, 28–26, 25–17); P2 Report			CMECC, Chiang Mai; Attendance: 1,631; Referees: Stanislava Simic (SRB), Ksenija Jurkovic (CRO)
26 August 2025; 16:00	Scoring leaders			CMECC, Chiang Mai; Attendance: 1,631; Referees: Stanislava Simic (SRB), Ksenija Jurkovic (CRO)
Cazaute (25/61)		Total	Anthouli (21/64)
Cazaute (19/36)		Attack	Anthouli (19/45)
Cazaute (5/11)		Block	Tontai (3/13)
Ndiaye (1/19)		Serve	Bakodimou (2/15)

=== Brazil vs Puerto Rico ===
The teams recently faced each other in the 2023 FIVB Volleyball Women's Olympic Qualification Tournaments, where Brazil won 3–0. They also played in the 2023 Pan American Games, with Brazil winning 3–0, but Brazil did not use the same squad as in the FIVB world tournaments. This was the fifth game between Brazil and Puerto Rico in the World Championship. Brazil has won all four of their previous meetings in 2006, 2010, 2014, and 2022.

26 August 2025; 19:30	Brazil	3–0	Puerto Rico	CMECC, Chiang Mai; Attendance: 3,533; Referees: Agnieszka Michlic (POL), Lourdes Perez Perez (CUB)
26 August 2025; 19:30	(25–19, 25–13, 25–18); P2 Report			CMECC, Chiang Mai; Attendance: 3,533; Referees: Agnieszka Michlic (POL), Lourdes Perez Perez (CUB)
26 August 2025; 19:30	Scoring leaders			CMECC, Chiang Mai; Attendance: 3,533; Referees: Agnieszka Michlic (POL), Lourdes Perez Perez (CUB)
Júlia (14/43)		Total	Vázquez (11/39)
Júlia (8/14)		Attack	Vázquez (11/27)
Júlia (6/19)		Block	Reyes (3/12)
Bergmann (1/11)		Serve
