= 2025 FIVB Women's Volleyball World Championship Pool D =

Pool D is one of eight pools of the preliminary round of the 2025 FIVB Women's Volleyball World Championship. The pool consists of the United States as well as the Czech Republic, Argentina, and Slovenia. Teams are playing one another in a round-robin, where the top two teams advancing to the final round.

It is currently taking place from 22 to 26 August 2025, with rest days on 23 and 25 August. Each matchday features two games, held at 16:00 and 19:30. As the seeded team, the United States will play all its matches at 19:30.

== Teams ==
The following four teams will compete in Pool D for the tournament, listed by their position in the pool.

Position	Country	Confederation	Qualified as	Qualified on	Previous appearances			Previous best performance
Position	Country	Confederation	Qualified as	Qualified on	Total	First	Last	Previous best performance
D1	United States	NORCECA	2023 NORCECA runners-up	2 September 2023	17	1956	2022	Champions (2014)
D2	Czech Republic^{ab}	CEV	4th World ranked non-qualified team	30 August 2024	12	1952	2022	3rd place (1952, 1960)
D3	Argentina	CSV	2023 South American runners-up	22 August 2023	7	1960	2022	8th place (1960)
D4	Slovenia	CEV	12th World ranked non-qualified team	30 August 2024	0	None		None

Notes
^{a} Designated as Czechia by the FIVB
^{b} Competed as Czechoslovakia from 1952 to 1986 (8 times); 4 appearances as Czech Republic.

== World Rankings ==
The following four teams are ranked in the FIVB World Rankings at the draw, the beginning and the final day of the tournament.

Position	Country	FIVB World Rankings		
Position	Country	Draw^{α}	Before^{β}	After^{γ}
D1	United States	3 (362.27)	7 (332.77)	7 (335.03)
D2	Czech Republic	15 (189.61)	13 (205.94)	15 (194.30)
D3	Argentina	17 (180.96)	17 (189.05)	17 (182.42)
D4	Slovenia	26 (137.47)	25 (150.51)	20 (161.08)

Notes
^{α} The FIVB World Ranking at the end of August 2024.
^{β} The FIVB World Ranking before the first game on 22 August 2025.
^{γ} The FIVB World Ranking after the final game on 7 September 2025.

== Standings ==
The following four teams are ranked based on the pool standing procedure.

Pos	Team	Pld	W	L	Pts	SW	SL	SR	SPW	SPL	SPR	Qualification
1	United States	3	3	0	9	9	2	4.500	266	211	1.261	Final round
2	Slovenia	3	1	2	4	6	6	1.000	263	261	1.008	Final round
3	Argentina	3	1	2	3	4	7	0.571	225	262	0.859	
4	Czech Republic	3	1	2	2	4	8	0.500	254	274	0.927	

Source: FIVB Women's World Championship - Standings
Rules for classification: Pool standing procedure
- The winners of Pool D will advance to play the runners-up of Pool E.
- The runners-up of Pool D will advance to play the winners of Pool E.

== Matches ==
The following six matches of Pool D will play at the Korat Chatchai Hall, Nakhon Ratchasima.

=== Czech Republic vs Argentina ===
The teams recently faced each other in the 2024 FIVB Women's Volleyball Challenger Cup, where the Czech Republic won 3–0. This is the second game between the Czech Republic and Argentina in the World Championship with Argentina winning in their first meeting in 2022.

22 August 2025; 16:00	Czech Republic	1–3	Argentina	Korat Chatchai Hall, Nakhon Ratchasima; Attendance: 695; Referees: Cespedes Francisco (DOM), Myoi Sumie (JPN)
22 August 2025; 16:00	(25–18, 23–25, 17–25, 24–26); P2 Report			Korat Chatchai Hall, Nakhon Ratchasima; Attendance: 695; Referees: Cespedes Francisco (DOM), Myoi Sumie (JPN)
22 August 2025; 16:00	Scoring leaders			Korat Chatchai Hall, Nakhon Ratchasima; Attendance: 695; Referees: Cespedes Francisco (DOM), Myoi Sumie (JPN)
Brancuská (17/53)		Total	Cugno (25/74)
Brancuská (16/36)		Attack	Cugno (23/57)
Grozer (2/10)		Block	García (4/18)
Valková (1/21)		Serve	Cabrera (2/12)

=== United States vs Slovenia ===
The teams recently faced each other in the 2023 FIVB Volleyball Women's Olympic Qualification Tournaments, where the United States won 3–1. This is the first game between the United States and Slovenia in the World Championship, marking Slovenia's debut in the tournament.

22 August 2025; 19:30	United States	3–1	Slovenia	Korat Chatchai Hall, Nakhon Ratchasima; Attendance: 1,511; Referees: Sonja Simonovska (MNE), Angela Grass (BRA)
22 August 2025; 19:30	(25–23,17–25, 25–22, 25–14); P2 Report			Korat Chatchai Hall, Nakhon Ratchasima; Attendance: 1,511; Referees: Sonja Simonovska (MNE), Angela Grass (BRA)
22 August 2025; 19:30	Scoring leaders			Korat Chatchai Hall, Nakhon Ratchasima; Attendance: 1,511; Referees: Sonja Simonovska (MNE), Angela Grass (BRA)
A. Skinner (15/49)		Total	Sillah (20/63)
A. Skinner (14/31)		Attack	Sillah (18/50)
Rettke (2/12)		Block	Milošič (4/15)
M. Skinner (2/17)		Serve	Milošič (2/19)

=== Czech Republic vs Slovenia ===
The teams recently faced each other in the 2024 Women's European Volleyball League, where the Czech Republic won 3–1. This is the first game between the Czech Republic and Slovenia in the World Championship.

24 August 2025; 16:00	Czech Republic	3–2	Slovenia	Korat Chatchai Hall, Nakhon Ratchasima; Attendance: 1,555; Referees: Yuliya Akulova (KAZ), Denny Francisco Cespedes Lassi (DOM)
24 August 2025; 16:00	(22–25, 19–25, 25–23, 25–18, 15–13); P2 Report			Korat Chatchai Hall, Nakhon Ratchasima; Attendance: 1,555; Referees: Yuliya Akulova (KAZ), Denny Francisco Cespedes Lassi (DOM)
24 August 2025; 16:00	Scoring leaders			Korat Chatchai Hall, Nakhon Ratchasima; Attendance: 1,555; Referees: Yuliya Akulova (KAZ), Denny Francisco Cespedes Lassi (DOM)
Brancuská (24/86)		Total	Sillah (23/90)
Brancuská (20/47)		Attack	Sillah (21/57)
Grozer (3/9)		Block	Milošič (6/21)
Brancuská (2/25)		Serve	Lorber Fijok (2/16)

=== United States vs Argentina ===
The teams recently faced each other in the 2020 Summer Olympics, where the United States won 3–0. This is the third game between the United States and Argentina in the World Championship. The United States has won both of their previous meetings in 1990 and 2002.

24 August 2025; 19:30	United States	3–1	Argentina	Korat Chatchai Hall, Nakhon Ratchasima; Attendance: 2,150; Referees: Kandil Wael (EGY), Sonja Simonovska (MNE)
24 August 2025; 19:30	(25–14, 23–25, 25–12, 25–17); P2 Report			Korat Chatchai Hall, Nakhon Ratchasima; Attendance: 2,150; Referees: Kandil Wael (EGY), Sonja Simonovska (MNE)
24 August 2025; 19:30	Scoring leaders			Korat Chatchai Hall, Nakhon Ratchasima; Attendance: 2,150; Referees: Kandil Wael (EGY), Sonja Simonovska (MNE)
Rettke (15/40)		Total	Cugno (29/85)
Franklin (13/26)		Attack	Cugno (26/64)
Ogbogu (5/21)		Block	Cugno (3/8)
Rettke (1/13)		Serve	Graff (2/13)

=== Argentina vs Slovenia ===
The teams have never met before. This is the first game between Argentina and Slovenia in any tournament, including the World Championship.

26 August 2025; 16:00	Argentina	0–3	Slovenia	Korat Chatchai Hall, Nakhon Ratchasima; Attendance: 771; Referees: Denny Francisco Cespedes Lassi (DOM), Angela Grass (BRA)
26 August 2025; 16:00	(20–25, 22–25, 21–25); P2 Report			Korat Chatchai Hall, Nakhon Ratchasima; Attendance: 771; Referees: Denny Francisco Cespedes Lassi (DOM), Angela Grass (BRA)
26 August 2025; 16:00	Scoring leaders			Korat Chatchai Hall, Nakhon Ratchasima; Attendance: 771; Referees: Denny Francisco Cespedes Lassi (DOM), Angela Grass (BRA)
Cugno (16/56)		Total	Sillah (22/58)
Cugno (14/41)		Attack	Sillah (20/43)
Cugno (2/8)		Block	Zatkovič (3/12)
Bertolino (1/6)		Serve	Milošič (3/14)

=== United States vs Czech Republic ===
The teams recently faced each other in the 2025 FIVB Women's Volleyball Nations League, where the Czech Republic won 3–2. This is the third game between the United States and the Czech Republic in the World Championship. The United States has won both of their previous meetings in 1994 and 2010. Prior to 1990, the former Czechoslovakia won twice in 1956 and 1960, while the United States won twice in 1978 and 1986.

26 August 2025; 19:30	United States	3–0	Czech Republic	Korat Chatchai Hall, Nakhon Ratchasima; Attendance: 1,944; Referees: Yuliya Akulova (KAZ), Sonja Simonovska (MNE)
26 August 2025; 19:30	(26–24, 25–20, 25–15); P2 Report			Korat Chatchai Hall, Nakhon Ratchasima; Attendance: 1,944; Referees: Yuliya Akulova (KAZ), Sonja Simonovska (MNE)
26 August 2025; 19:30	Scoring leaders			Korat Chatchai Hall, Nakhon Ratchasima; Attendance: 1,944; Referees: Yuliya Akulova (KAZ), Sonja Simonovska (MNE)
A. Skinner (15/46)		Total	Mlejnková (14/51)
A. Skinner (13/24)		Attack	Mlejnková (13/31)
M. Skinner (2/11)		Block	Grozer (1/5)
Eggleston (1/8)		Serve	Koulisiani (3/12)
