= 2025 FIVB Women's Volleyball World Championship Pool A =

Pool A was one of eight pools of the preliminary round of the 2025 FIVB Women's Volleyball World Championship. The pool consisted of the host country, Thailand, as well as the Netherlands, Sweden, and Egypt. Teams were played one another in a round-robin, where the top two teams advanced to the final round.

It took place from 22 to 26 August 2025, with rest days on 23 and 25 August. Each matchday featured two games, held at 17:00 and 20:30. As the seeded team, Thailand played all its matches at 20:30.

== Teams ==
The following four teams competed in Pool A for the tournament, listed by their position in the pool.

Position	Country	Confederation	Qualified as	Qualified on	Previous appearances			Previous best performance
Position	Country	Confederation	Qualified as	Qualified on	Total	First	Last	Previous best performance
A1	Thailand^{a}	AVC	Host country	30 August 2024	6	1998	2022	13th place (1998, 2010, 2018, 2022)
A2	Netherlands	CEV	2023 European 3rd placers	30 August 2023	15	1956	2022	4th place (2018)
A3	Sweden	CEV	10th World ranked non-qualified team	30 August 2024	0	None		None
A4	Egypt	CAVB	2023 African runners-up	23 August 2023	3	1990	2006	16th place (1990)

Notes
^{a} Originally qualified on 5 September 2023 as the Asian champions. Their spot was allocated to Vietnam, after being awarded hosting rights on 30 August 2024.

== World Rankings ==
The following four teams were ranked in the FIVB World Rankings at the draw, the beginning and the final day of the tournament.

Position	Country	FIVB World Rankings		
Position	Country	Draw^{α}	Before^{β}	After^{γ}
A1	Thailand	13 (194.91)	21 (160.42)	18 (171.66)
A2	Netherlands	9 (283.99)	8 (262.75)	8 (270.58)
A3	Sweden	24 (138.57)	26 (149.09)	26 (141.12)
A4	Egypt	36 (104.62)	51 (54.62)	56 (46.90)

Notes
^{α} The FIVB World Ranking at the end of August 2024.
^{β} The FIVB World Ranking before the first game on 22 August 2025.
^{γ} The FIVB World Ranking after the final game on 7 September 2025.

== Standings ==
The following four teams were ranked based on the pool standing procedure.

Pos	Team	Pld	W	L	Pts	SW	SL	SR	SPW	SPL	SPR	Qualification
1	Netherlands	3	3	0	7	9	4	2.250	298	225	1.324	Final round
2	Thailand (H)	3	2	1	7	8	4	2.000	264	238	1.109	Final round
3	Sweden	3	1	2	4	5	7	0.714	254	268	0.948	
4	Egypt	3	0	3	0	2	9	0.222	189	274	0.690	

Source: FIVB Women's World Championship - Standings
Rules for classification: Pool standing procedure
(H) Host

== Matches ==
All times are Thailand Standard Time (UTC+07:00).

The following six matches of Pool A were played at the Indoor Stadium Huamark, Bangkok.

=== Netherlands vs Sweden ===
The teams recently faced each other in the 2021 Women's European Volleyball Championship, where the Netherlands won 3–0. This was the first game between the Netherlands and Sweden in the World Championship, marking Sweden's debut in the tournament.

22 August 2025; 17:00	Netherlands	3–2	Sweden	Indoor Stadium Huamark, Bangkok; Attendance: 2,210; Referees: Rene Noemi (ARG), Cameron Andrew (CAN)
22 August 2025; 17:00	(25–27, 25–11, 25–21, 21–25, 15–9); P2 Report			Indoor Stadium Huamark, Bangkok; Attendance: 2,210; Referees: Rene Noemi (ARG), Cameron Andrew (CAN)
22 August 2025; 17:00	Scoring leaders			Indoor Stadium Huamark, Bangkok; Attendance: 2,210; Referees: Rene Noemi (ARG), Cameron Andrew (CAN)
Dambrink (18/77)		Total	I. Haak (31/106)
Dambrink (18/51)		Attack	I. Haak (27/76)
Timmerman (6/21)		Block	A. Haak (5/14)
Timmerman (1/21)		Serve	I. Haak (3/21)

=== Thailand vs Egypt ===
The teams have never met before. This was the first game between Thailand and Egypt in any tournament.

22 August 2025; 20:30	Thailand	3–1	Egypt	Indoor Stadium Huamark, Bangkok; Attendance: 4,342; Referees: Fernandez Fuentes (ESP), Dominga Lot (ITA)
22 August 2025; 20:30	(25–15, 23–25, 25–15, 25–11); P2 Report			Indoor Stadium Huamark, Bangkok; Attendance: 4,342; Referees: Fernandez Fuentes (ESP), Dominga Lot (ITA)
22 August 2025; 20:30	Scoring leaders			Indoor Stadium Huamark, Bangkok; Attendance: 4,342; Referees: Fernandez Fuentes (ESP), Dominga Lot (ITA)
Pimpichaya (19/57)		Total	Nada (14/52)
Pimpichaya (17/41)		Attack	Tokka (11/41)
Thatdao (4/17)		Block	Dana (3/7)
Wimonrat (3/12)		Serve	Nada (2/9)

=== Netherlands vs Egypt ===
The teams recently faced each other in the 2002 FIVB Women's Volleyball World Championship, where the Netherlands won 3–0. This was the second game between the Netherlands and Egypt in the World Championship.

24 August 2025; 17:00	Netherlands	3–0	Egypt	Indoor Stadium Huamark, Bangkok; Attendance: 3,242; Referees: David Fernandez Fuentes (ESP), Nathan Mahaven (USA)
24 August 2025; 17:00	(25–15, 25–13, 25–13); P2 Report			Indoor Stadium Huamark, Bangkok; Attendance: 3,242; Referees: David Fernandez Fuentes (ESP), Nathan Mahaven (USA)
24 August 2025; 17:00	Scoring leaders			Indoor Stadium Huamark, Bangkok; Attendance: 3,242; Referees: David Fernandez Fuentes (ESP), Nathan Mahaven (USA)
Van de Vosse (12/19)		Total	Meeto (9/35)
Van de Vosse (10/13)		Attack	Meeto (8/24)
Daalderop (3/6)		Block	Dana (2/3)
Van de Hosse (1/5)		Serve

=== Thailand vs Sweden ===
The teams have never met before. This was the first game between Thailand and Sweden in any tournament.

24 August 2025; 20:30	Thailand	3–0	Sweden	Indoor Stadium Huamark, Bangkok; Attendance: 5,542; Referees: Cameron Andrew (CAN), Dominga Lot (POL)
24 August 2025; 20:30	(25–18, 25–20, 25–22); P2 Report			Indoor Stadium Huamark, Bangkok; Attendance: 5,542; Referees: Cameron Andrew (CAN), Dominga Lot (POL)
24 August 2025; 20:30	Scoring leaders			Indoor Stadium Huamark, Bangkok; Attendance: 5,542; Referees: Cameron Andrew (CAN), Dominga Lot (POL)
Pimpichaya (23/60)		Total	I. Haak (25/60)
Pimpichaya (20/36)		Attack	I. Haak (24/42)
Pimpichaya (1/5)		Block	Gustafsson (2/6)
Pimpichaya (2/19)		Serve	Gustafsson (1/9)

=== Sweden vs Egypt ===
The teams have never met before. This was the first game between Sweden and Egypt in any tournament.

26 August 2025; 17:00	Sweden	3–1	Egypt	Indoor Stadium Huamark, Bangkok; Attendance: 2,131; Referees: Nathan Mahaven (USA), David Fernandez Fuentes (ESP)
26 August 2025; 17:00	(25–18, 26–28, 25–20, 25–16); P2 Report			Indoor Stadium Huamark, Bangkok; Attendance: 2,131; Referees: Nathan Mahaven (USA), David Fernandez Fuentes (ESP)
26 August 2025; 17:00	Scoring leaders			Indoor Stadium Huamark, Bangkok; Attendance: 2,131; Referees: Nathan Mahaven (USA), David Fernandez Fuentes (ESP)
I. Haak (39/85)		Total	Nada (18/71)
I. Haak (34/61)		Attack	Nada (17/46)
I. Haak (3/6)		Block	Dalia (2/14)
I. Haak (2/18)		Serve	Nada (1/17)

=== Thailand vs Netherlands ===
The teams recently faced each other in the 2023 FIVB Women's Volleyball Nations League, where the Netherlands won 3–0. This was the third game between Thailand and the Netherlands in the World Championship with each team having won once — Thailand in 2010 and the Netherlands in 2014.

26 August 2025; 20:30	Thailand	2–3	Netherlands	Indoor Stadium Huamark, Bangkok; Attendance: 5,641; Referees: Dominga Lot (ITA), Mohamed Moez Baouab (TUN)
26 August 2025; 20:30	(25–23, 17–25, 25–23, 10–25, 14–16); P2 Report			Indoor Stadium Huamark, Bangkok; Attendance: 5,641; Referees: Dominga Lot (ITA), Mohamed Moez Baouab (TUN)
26 August 2025; 20:30	Scoring leaders			Indoor Stadium Huamark, Bangkok; Attendance: 5,641; Referees: Dominga Lot (ITA), Mohamed Moez Baouab (TUN)
Pimpichaya (20/76)		Total	Daalderop (26/70)
Pimpichaya (18/49)		Attack	Daalderop (20/41)
Chatchu-on (3/7)		Block	Daalderop (6/13)
Thatdao (1/14)		Serve	Timmerman (3/31)
