= 2025 FIVB Women's Volleyball World Championship Pool B =

Pool B was one of eight pools of the preliminary round of the 2025 FIVB Women's Volleyball World Championship. The pool consisted of the current Olympic champion, Italy, as well as Belgium, Cuba, and Slovakia. Teams were played one another in a round-robin, where the top two teams advanced to the final round.

It took place from 22 to 26 August 2025, with rest days on 23 and 25 August. Each matchday features two games, held at 17:00 and 20:30. As the seeded team, Italy played at 20:30 in the first match against Slovakia, while their two remaining matches against Cuba and Belgium were played at 17:00 due to a broadcast time conflict with the Thailand vs. Sweden and the Thailand vs. Netherlands match in Pool A.

== Teams ==
The following four teams competed in Pool B for the tournament, listed by their position in the pool.

Position	Country	Confederation	Qualified as	Qualified on	Previous appearances			Previous best performance
Position	Country	Confederation	Qualified as	Qualified on	Total	First	Last	Previous best performance
B1	Italy^{a}	CEV	2023 European 4th placers	30 August 2023	12	1978	2022	Champions (2002)
B2	Belgium	CEV	3rd World ranked non-qualified team	30 August 2024	4	1956	2022	9th place (2022)
B3	Cuba	NORCECA	9th World ranked non-qualified team	30 August 2024	13	1970	2018	Champions (1978, 1994, 1998)
B4	Slovakia	CEV	13th World ranked non-qualified team	30 August 2024	0	None		None

Notes
^{a} Finished at the European Championship as the 4th placers. Their spot was reallocated from Serbia, after qualified as the defending champions.

== World Rankings ==
The following four teams were ranked in the FIVB World Rankings at the draw, the beginning and the final day of the tournament.

Position	Country	FIVB World Rankings		
Position	Country	Draw^{α}	Before^{β}	After^{γ}
B1	Italy	1 (437.03)	1 (474.26)	1 (484.15)
B2	Belgium	14 (190.98)	14 (195.20)	14 (211.23)
B3	Cuba	23 (145.17)	28 (140.06)	27 (139.85)
B4	Slovakia	26 (137.47)	29 (128.54)	33 (112.34)

Notes
^{α} The FIVB World Ranking at the end of August 2024.
^{β} The FIVB World Ranking before the first game on 22 August 2025.
^{γ} The FIVB World Ranking after the final game on 7 September 2025.

== Standings ==
The following four teams were ranked based on the pool standing procedure.

Pos	Team	Pld	W	L	Pts	SW	SL	SR	SPW	SPL	SPR	Qualification
1	Italy	3	3	0	9	9	1	9.000	246	159	1.547	Final round
2	Belgium	3	2	1	6	7	3	2.333	225	198	1.136	Final round
3	Cuba	3	1	2	3	3	7	0.429	181	245	0.739	
4	Slovakia	3	0	3	0	1	9	0.111	200	250	0.800	

Source: FIVB Women's World Championship - Standings
Rules for classification: Pool standing procedure

== Matches ==
All times are Thailand Standard Time (UTC+07:00).

The following six matches of Pool B were played at the Phuket Municipal Stadium, Phuket.

=== Belgium vs Cuba ===
The teams recently faced each other in the 2014 FIVB Women's Volleyball World Championship, where Belgium won 3–0. This was the second game between Belgium and Cuba in the World Championship.

22 August 2025; 17:00	Belgium	3–0	Cuba	Phuket Municipal Stadium, Phuket; Attendance: 2,283; Referees: Joo-Hee Kang (KOR), Ivaylo Ivanov (BUL)
22 August 2025; 17:00	(25–23, 25–14, 25–11); P2 Report			Phuket Municipal Stadium, Phuket; Attendance: 2,283; Referees: Joo-Hee Kang (KOR), Ivaylo Ivanov (BUL)
22 August 2025; 17:00	Scoring leaders			Phuket Municipal Stadium, Phuket; Attendance: 2,283; Referees: Joo-Hee Kang (KOR), Ivaylo Ivanov (BUL)
Lemmens (12/39)		Total	Tarin (8/36)
Herbots (10/23)		Attack	Tarin (8/27)
Van Avermaet (5/12)		Block	Suárez (1/4)
Lemmens (2/19)		Serve	Martínez (2/8)

=== Italy vs Slovakia ===
The teams recently faced each other in the 2021 Women's European Volleyball Championship, where Italy won 3–1. This was the first game between Italy and Slovakia in the World Championship, marking Slovakia's debut in the tournament.

22 August 2025; 20:30	Italy	3–0	Slovakia	Phuket Municipal Stadium, Phuket; Attendance: 2,866; Referees: Ziling Wang (CHN), Ozan Çağı Sarikaya (TUR)
22 August 2025; 20:30	(25–20, 25–14, 25–17); P2 Report			Phuket Municipal Stadium, Phuket; Attendance: 2,866; Referees: Ziling Wang (CHN), Ozan Çağı Sarikaya (TUR)
22 August 2025; 20:30	Scoring leaders			Phuket Municipal Stadium, Phuket; Attendance: 2,866; Referees: Ziling Wang (CHN), Ozan Çağı Sarikaya (TUR)
Egonu (15/36)		Total	Šunderlíková (12/37)
Egonu (12/18)		Attack	Šunderlíková (10/24)
Fahr (2/8)		Block	Hrušecká (1/7)
Nervini (2/9)		Serve	Šunderlíková (2/11)

=== Italy vs Cuba ===
The teams recently faced each other in the 2018 FIVB Women's Volleyball World Championship, where Italy won 3–0. This was the sixth game between Italy and Cuba in the World Championship. Cuba has won three of the previous meetings in 1998, 2002, and 2010, while Italy has won two in 2006 and 2018.

24 August 2025; 17:00	Italy	3–0	Cuba	Phuket Municipal Stadium, Phuket; Attendance: 2,347; Referees: Sasiprapa Pimthongkhonburi (THA), Ozan Çağı Sarikaya (TUR)
24 August 2025; 17:00	(25–9, 25–8, 25–16); P2 Report			Phuket Municipal Stadium, Phuket; Attendance: 2,347; Referees: Sasiprapa Pimthongkhonburi (THA), Ozan Çağı Sarikaya (TUR)
24 August 2025; 17:00	Scoring leaders			Phuket Municipal Stadium, Phuket; Attendance: 2,347; Referees: Sasiprapa Pimthongkhonburi (THA), Ozan Çağı Sarikaya (TUR)
Egonu (12/23)		Total	Madan (8/39)
Egonu (8/12)		Attack	Madan (8/31)
Orro (3/6)		Block	Martínez (2/4)
Egonu (2/6)		Serve	Suárez (1/7)

=== Belgium vs Slovakia ===
The teams recently faced each other in an official match during the European qualification of the 2012 Summer Olympics, where Belgium won 3–0. They also played a friendly match in 2023, with Belgium winning 3–1. This was the first game between Belgium and Slovakia in the World Championship.

24 August 2025; 20:30	Belgium	3–0	Slovakia	Phuket Municipal Stadium, Phuket; Attendance: 2,655; Referees: Ivaylo Ivanov (BUL), Vlastimil Kovar (CZE)
24 August 2025; 20:30	(25–19, 25–17, 25–18); P2 Report			Phuket Municipal Stadium, Phuket; Attendance: 2,655; Referees: Ivaylo Ivanov (BUL), Vlastimil Kovar (CZE)
24 August 2025; 20:30	Scoring leaders			Phuket Municipal Stadium, Phuket; Attendance: 2,655; Referees: Ivaylo Ivanov (BUL), Vlastimil Kovar (CZE)
Herbots (21/59)		Total	Hrušecká (13/35)
Herbots (18/42)		Attack	Hrušecká (9/10)
Van Avermaet (3/12)		Block	Hrušecká (3/18)
Herbots (2/12)		Serve	Šunderlíková (1/10)

=== Italy vs Belgium ===
The teams recently faced each other in the 2025 FIVB Women's Volleyball Nations League, where Italy won 3–0. This was the fourth game between Italy and Belgium in the World Championship. Italy has won all three of the previous meeting in 1978, 2014, and 2022.

26 August 2025; 17:00	Italy	3–1	Belgium	Phuket Municipal Stadium, Phuket; Attendance: 2,507; Referees: Ziling Wang (CHN), Ivaylo Ivanov (BUL)
26 August 2025; 17:00	(25–16, 25–16, 21–25, 25–18); P2 Report			Phuket Municipal Stadium, Phuket; Attendance: 2,507; Referees: Ziling Wang (CHN), Ivaylo Ivanov (BUL)
26 August 2025; 17:00	Scoring leaders			Phuket Municipal Stadium, Phuket; Attendance: 2,507; Referees: Ziling Wang (CHN), Ivaylo Ivanov (BUL)
Egonu (28/82)		Total	Martin (16/53)
Egonu (23/51)		Attack	Martin (15/40)
Egonu (4/15)		Block	Koulberg (1/2)
Egonu (1/16)		Serve	Krenicky (2/13)

=== Cuba vs Slovakia ===
The teams have never met before. This was the first game between Cuba and Slovakia in any tournament, including the World Championship.

26 August 2025; 20:30	Cuba	3–1	Slovakia	Phuket Municipal Stadium, Phuket; Attendance: 1,735; Referees: Ozan Çağı Sarikaya (TUR), Vlastimil Kovar (CZE)
26 August 2025; 20:30	(27–25, 25–21, 22–25, 26–24); P2 Report			Phuket Municipal Stadium, Phuket; Attendance: 1,735; Referees: Ozan Çağı Sarikaya (TUR), Vlastimil Kovar (CZE)
26 August 2025; 20:30	Scoring leaders			Phuket Municipal Stadium, Phuket; Attendance: 1,735; Referees: Ozan Çağı Sarikaya (TUR), Vlastimil Kovar (CZE)
Martínez (20/62)		Total	Šepeľová (25/79)
Martínez (19/42)		Attack	Šepeľová (22/56)
Suárez (4/13)		Block	Herelová (4/13)
Martínez (2/21)		Serve	Jelínková (3/11)
