= 2025 FIVB Women's Volleyball World Championship Pool H =

Pool H is one of eight pools of the preliminary round of the 2025 FIVB Women's Volleyball World Championship. The pool consists of Japan as well as the defending champions Serbia, Ukraine, and Cameroon. Teams are playing one another in a round-robin, where the top two teams advancing to the final round.

It is currently taking place from 23 to 27 August 2025, with rest days on 24 and 26 August. Each matchday features two games, held at 17:00 and 20:30. As the seeded team, Japan would play all its matches at 17:00 instead of 20:30, as this time corresponds to prime time for live broadcasting in Japan, which is 2 hours ahead of Thailand.

== Teams ==
The following four teams are competing in Pool H for the tournament, listed by their position in the pool.

| Position | Country | Confederation | Qualified as | Qualified on | Previous appearances | | | Previous best performance |
| Position | Country | Confederation | Qualified as | Qualified on | Total | First | Last | Previous best performance |
|---|---|---|---|---|---|---|---|---|
| H1 | Japan | AVC | 2023 Asian 3rd placers | 6 September 2023 | 17 | 1960 | 2022 | Champions (1962, 1967, 1974) |
| H2 | Serbia^{ab} | CEV | Defending champions | 15 October 2022 | 6 | 1978 | 2022 | Champions (2018, 2022) |
| H3 | Ukraine | CEV | 6th World ranked non-qualified team | 30 August 2024 | 1 | 1994 | | 9th place (1994) |
| H4 | Cameroon | CAVB | 2023 African 3rd placers | 24 August 2023 | 4 | 2006 | 2022 | 21st place (2006, 2014, 2018) |

Notes
^{a} Competed as SFR Yugoslavia in 1978 (1 time) and as Serbia and Montenegro in 2006 (1 time); 4 appearances as Serbia.
^{b} Finished at the European Championship as the runners-up. Their spot was allocated to Italy, after qualified as the defending champions.

== World Rankings ==
The following four teams are ranked in the FIVB World Rankings at the draw, the beginning and the final day of the tournament.

| Position | Country | FIVB World Rankings | | |
| Position | Country | Draw^{α} | Before^{β} | After^{γ} |
|---|---|---|---|---|
| H1 | Japan | 7 (325.18) | 5 (348.27) | 5 (346.26) |
| H2 | Serbia | 10 (280.42) | 9 (261.84) | 9 (261.31) |
| H3 | Ukraine | 18 (172.15) | 16 (192.10) | 16 (190.20) |
| H4 | Cameroon | 27 (135.69) | 44 (85.69) | 45 (76.72) |

Notes
^{α} The FIVB World Ranking at the end of August 2024.
^{β} The FIVB World Ranking before the first game on 22 August 2025.
^{γ} The FIVB World Ranking after the final game on 7 September 2025.

== Standings ==
The following four teams are ranked based on the pool standing procedure.

| Pos | Team | Pld | W | L | Pts | SW | SL | SR | SPW | SPL | SPR | Qualification |
|---|---|---|---|---|---|---|---|---|---|---|---|---|
| 1 | Japan | 3 | 3 | 0 | 8 | 9 | 3 | 3.000 | 289 | 258 | 1.120 | Final round |
| 2 | Serbia | 3 | 2 | 1 | 6 | 7 | 3 | 2.333 | 244 | 205 | 1.190 | Final round |
| 3 | Ukraine | 3 | 1 | 2 | 4 | 5 | 6 | 0.833 | 239 | 244 | 0.980 | |
| 4 | Cameroon | 3 | 0 | 3 | 0 | 0 | 9 | 0.000 | 160 | 225 | 0.711 | |

Source: FIVB Women's World Championship - Standings
Rules for classification: Pool standing procedure
- The winners of Pool H will advance to play the runners-up of Pool A.
- The runners-up of Pool H will advance to play the winners of Pool A.

== Matches ==
The following six matches of Pool H will play at the Indoor Stadium Huamark, Bangkok.

=== Japan vs Cameroon ===
The teams recently faced each other in the 2019 FIVB Volleyball Women's World Cup, where Japan won 3–0. This is the second game between Japan and Cameroon in the World Championship with Japan winning in their first meeting in 2018.

| 23 August 2025; 17:00 | Japan | 3–0 | Cameroon | Indoor Stadium Huamark, Bangkok; Attendance: 2,994; Referees: Nathan Mahaven (USA), Mohamed Moez Baouab (TUN) |
| 23 August 2025; 17:00 | (25–21, 25–17, 25–19); P2 Report | | | Indoor Stadium Huamark, Bangkok; Attendance: 2,994; Referees: Nathan Mahaven (USA), Mohamed Moez Baouab (TUN) |
| 23 August 2025; 17:00 | Scoring leaders | | | Indoor Stadium Huamark, Bangkok; Attendance: 2,994; Referees: Nathan Mahaven (USA), Mohamed Moez Baouab (TUN) |
| Akimoto (18/44) | | Total | Blamdaî (11/42) |
| Akimoto (14/34) | | Attack | Blamdaî (8/24) |
| Akimoto (1/2) | | Block | Blamdaî (2/8) |
| Seki (4/15) | | Serve | Blamdaî (1/10) |

=== Serbia vs Ukraine ===
The teams recently faced each other in the 2023 FIVB Volleyball Women's Olympic Qualification Tournaments, where Serbia won 3–0. This is the first game between Serbia and Ukraine in the World Championship.

| 23 August 2025; 20:30 | Serbia | 3–0 | Ukraine | Indoor Stadium Huamark, Bangkok; Attendance: 3,390; Referees: Dominga Lot (ITA), Karina Noemi Rene (ARG) |
| 23 August 2025; 20:30 | (25–21, 25–19, 25–17); P2 Report | | | Indoor Stadium Huamark, Bangkok; Attendance: 3,390; Referees: Dominga Lot (ITA), Karina Noemi Rene (ARG) |
| 23 August 2025; 20:30 | Scoring leaders | | | Indoor Stadium Huamark, Bangkok; Attendance: 3,390; Referees: Dominga Lot (ITA), Karina Noemi Rene (ARG) |
| Bošković (19/44) | | Total | Artyshuk (13/41) |
| Bošković (18/30) | | Attack | Artyshuk (12/28) |
| Kurtagić (5/12) | | Block | Meliushkyna (1/9) |
| Uzelac (3/18) | | Serve | Artyshuk (1/7) |

=== Japan vs Ukraine ===
The teams recently faced each other in the 1996 Summer Olympics, where Japan won 3–0. This is the second game between Japan and Ukraine in the World Championship with Japan winning in their first meeting in 1994.

| 25 August 2025; 17:00 | Japan | 3–2 | Ukraine | Indoor Stadium Huamark, Bangkok; Attendance: 1,141; Referees: Karina Noemi Rene (ARG), Nathan Mahaven (USA) |
| 25 August 2025; 17:00 | (25–27, 20–25, 25–20, 26–24, 15–11); P2 Report | | | Indoor Stadium Huamark, Bangkok; Attendance: 1,141; Referees: Karina Noemi Rene (ARG), Nathan Mahaven (USA) |
| 25 August 2025; 17:00 | Scoring leaders | | | Indoor Stadium Huamark, Bangkok; Attendance: 1,141; Referees: Karina Noemi Rene (ARG), Nathan Mahaven (USA) |
| Ishikawa (29/91) | | Total | Milenko (21/67) |
| Ishikawa (26/65) | | Attack | Milenko (20/46) |
| Ishikawa (3/7) | | Block | Meliushkyna (11/27) |
| Seki (1/20) | | Serve | Sharhorodska (2/23) |

=== Serbia vs Cameroon ===
The teams recently faced each other in the 2019 FIVB Volleyball Women's World Cup, where Serbia won 3–0. This is the second game between Serbia and Cameroon in the World Championship with Serbia winning in their first meeting in 2014.

| 25 August 2025; 20:30 | Serbia | 3–0 | Cameroon | Indoor Stadium Huamark, Bangkok; Attendance: 1,283; Referees: Mohamed Moez Baouab (TUN), Andrew Cameron (CAN) |
| 25 August 2025; 20:30 | (25–16, 25–16, 25–12); P2 Report | | | Indoor Stadium Huamark, Bangkok; Attendance: 1,283; Referees: Mohamed Moez Baouab (TUN), Andrew Cameron (CAN) |
| 25 August 2025; 20:30 | Scoring leaders | | | Indoor Stadium Huamark, Bangkok; Attendance: 1,283; Referees: Mohamed Moez Baouab (TUN), Andrew Cameron (CAN) |
| Uzelac (18/36) | | Total | Olomo (11/30) |
| Uzelac (16/25) | | Attack | Blamdaî (10/27) |
| Aleksić (5/9) | | Block | Olomo (3/11) |
| Aleksić (2/10) | | Serve | Olomo (2/11) |

=== Japan vs Serbia ===
The teams recently faced each other in the 2025 FIVB Women's Volleyball Nations League, where Japan won 3–0. This is the fifth game between Japan and Serbia in the World Championship. Japan has won three of their previous meetings in 2006, 2010, and the second round of 2018, while Serbia won their fourth meeting in the third round of 2018.

| 27 August 2025; 17:00 | Japan | 3–1 | Serbia | Indoor Stadium Huamark, Bangkok; Attendance: 4,142; Referees: Cameron Andrew (CAN), Karina Noemi Rene (ARG) |
| 27 August 2025; 17:00 | (25–23, 30–28, 23–25, 25–18); P2 Report | | | Indoor Stadium Huamark, Bangkok; Attendance: 4,142; Referees: Cameron Andrew (CAN), Karina Noemi Rene (ARG) |
| 27 August 2025; 17:00 | Scoring leaders | | | Indoor Stadium Huamark, Bangkok; Attendance: 4,142; Referees: Cameron Andrew (CAN), Karina Noemi Rene (ARG) |
| Ishikawa (19/64) | | Total | Uzelac (20/81) |
| Ishikawa (17/40) | | Attack | Uzelac (19/52) |
| Seki (3/7) | | Block | Aleksić (4/20) |
| Ishikawa (2/19) | | Serve | Bukilić (2/14) |

=== Ukraine vs Cameroon ===
The teams have never met before. This is the first game between Ukraine and Cameroon in any tournament, including the World Championship.

| 27 August 2025; 20:30 | Ukraine | 3–0 | Cameroon | Indoor Stadium Huamark, Bangkok; Attendance: 4,433; Referees: David Fernandez Fuentes (ESP), Dominga Lot (ITA) |
| 27 August 2025; 20:30 | (25–17, 25–21, 25–20); P2 Report | | | Indoor Stadium Huamark, Bangkok; Attendance: 4,433; Referees: David Fernandez Fuentes (ESP), Dominga Lot (ITA) |
| 27 August 2025; 20:30 | Scoring leaders | | | Indoor Stadium Huamark, Bangkok; Attendance: 4,433; Referees: David Fernandez Fuentes (ESP), Dominga Lot (ITA) |
| Meliushkyna (13/34) | | Total | Blamdaî (14/41) |
| Milenko (10/18) | | Attack | Blamdaî (11/30) |
| Meliushkyna (3/6) | | Block | Olomo (5/15) |
| Artyshuk (3/11) | | Serve | Olomo (1/11) |
