= 2025 FIVB Women's Volleyball World Championship Pool G =

Pool G was one of eight pools of the preliminary round of the 2025 FIVB Women's Volleyball World Championship. The pool consisted of Poland as well as Germany, Kenya, and Vietnam. Teams played one another in a round-robin, where the top two teams advancing to the final round.

It took place from 25 to 27 August 2025, with rest days on 24 and 26 August. Each matchday featured two games, held at 17:00 and 20:30. As the seeded team, Poland played all its matches at 20:30.

== Teams ==
The following four teams are competing in Pool G for the tournament, listed by their position in the pool.

Position	Country	Confederation	Qualified as	Qualified on	Previous appearances			Previous best performance
Position	Country	Confederation	Qualified as	Qualified on	Total	First	Last	Previous best performance
G1	Poland	CEV	1st World ranked non-qualified team	30 August 2024	11	1952	2022	Runners-up (1952)
G2	Germany^{a}	CEV	2nd World ranked non-qualified team	30 August 2024	17	1956	2022	4th place (1974, 1986)
G3	Kenya	CAVB	2023 African champions	23 August 2023	7	1994	2022	13th place (1994, 1998)
G4	Vietnam^{b}	AVC	2023 Asian 4th placers	30 August 2024	0	None		None

Notes
^{a} Competed as East Germany from 1956 to 1990 (7 times) and as West Germany from 1956 to 1990 (8 times); 8 appearances as Germany.
^{b} Finished at the Asian Championship as the 4th placers. Their spot was reallocated from Thailand, after qualified as the host country on 30 August 2024.

== World Rankings ==
The following four teams are ranked in the FIVB World Rankings at the draw, the beginning and the final day of the tournament.

Position	Country	FIVB World Rankings		
Position	Country	Draw^{α}	Before^{β}	After^{γ}
G1	Poland	6 (349.75)	3 (365.17)	4 (359.85)
G2	Germany	12 (222.03)	11 (243.68)	10 (254.86)
G3	Kenya	22 (152.15)	23 (152.15)	21 (158.49)
G4	Vietnam	33 (112.73)	22 (155.79)	28 (136.75)

Notes
^{α} The FIVB World Ranking at the end of August 2024.
^{β} The FIVB World Ranking before the first game on 22 August 2025.
^{γ} The FIVB World Ranking after the final game on 7 September 2025.

== Standings ==
The following four teams are ranked based on the pool standing procedure.

Pos	Team	Pld	W	L	Pts	SW	SL	SR	SPW	SPL	SPR	Qualification
1	Poland	3	3	0	8	9	4	2.250	300	248	1.210	Final round
2	Germany	3	2	1	7	8	3	2.667	258	218	1.183	Final round
3	Kenya	3	1	2	3	4	6	0.667	196	228	0.860	
4	Vietnam	3	0	3	0	1	9	0.111	188	248	0.758	

Source: FIVB Women's World Championship - Standings
Rules for classification: Pool standing procedure
- The winners of Pool G will advance to play the runners-up of Pool B.
- The runners-up of Pool G will advance to play the winners of Pool B.

== Matches ==
The following six matches of Pool G will play at the Phuket Municipal Stadium, Phuket.

=== Germany vs Kenya ===
The teams recently faced each other in the 2011 FIVB Volleyball Women's World Cup, where Germany won 3–0. This is the first game between Germany and Kenya in the World Championship.

23 August 2025; 17:00	Germany	3–0	Kenya	Phuket Municipal Stadium, Phuket; Attendance: 2,045; Referees: Vlastimil Kovar (CZE), Joo-hee Kang (KOR)
23 August 2025; 17:00	(25–22, 25–8, 25–20); P2 Report			Phuket Municipal Stadium, Phuket; Attendance: 2,045; Referees: Vlastimil Kovar (CZE), Joo-hee Kang (KOR)
23 August 2025; 17:00	Scoring leaders			Phuket Municipal Stadium, Phuket; Attendance: 2,045; Referees: Vlastimil Kovar (CZE), Joo-hee Kang (KOR)
Weske (13/42)		Total	Adhiambo (19/49)
Alsmeier (12/23)		Attack	Adhiambo (19/41)
Weitzel (3/13)		Block	Ekaru (1/5)
Stautz (2/7)		Serve	Sande (1/10)

=== Poland vs Vietnam ===
The teams have never met before. This is the first game between Poland and Vietnam in any tournament, including the World Championship, marking Vietnam's debut in the tournament.

23 August 2025; 20:30	Poland	3–1	Vietnam	Phuket Municipal Stadium, Phuket; Attendance: 3,080; Referees: Ozan Çağı Sarikaya (TUR), Sasiprapa Pimthongkhonburi (THA)
23 August 2025; 20:30	(23–25, 25–10, 25–12, 25–22); P2 Report			Phuket Municipal Stadium, Phuket; Attendance: 3,080; Referees: Ozan Çağı Sarikaya (TUR), Sasiprapa Pimthongkhonburi (THA)
23 August 2025; 20:30	Scoring leaders			Phuket Municipal Stadium, Phuket; Attendance: 3,080; Referees: Ozan Çağı Sarikaya (TUR), Sasiprapa Pimthongkhonburi (THA)
Stysiak (29/65)		Total	V.T.N.Quỳnh (20/60)
Stysiak (23/36)		Attack	V.T.N.Quynh (18/44)
Stysiak (6/13)		Block	H.T.K.Trinh (2/6)
Czyrniańska (2/22)		Serve	D.T.L.Oanh (2/14)

=== Germany vs Vietnam ===
The teams have never met before. This is the first game between Germany and Vietnam in any tournament, including the World Championship.

25 August 2025; 17:00	Germany	3–0	Vietnam	Phuket Municipal Stadium, Phuket; Attendance: 1,837; Referees: Vlastimil Kovar (CZE), Ziling Wang (CHN)
25 August 2025; 17:00	(25–18, 25–17, 25–21); P2 Report			Phuket Municipal Stadium, Phuket; Attendance: 1,837; Referees: Vlastimil Kovar (CZE), Ziling Wang (CHN)
25 August 2025; 17:00	Scoring leaders			Phuket Municipal Stadium, Phuket; Attendance: 1,837; Referees: Vlastimil Kovar (CZE), Ziling Wang (CHN)
Weitzel (16/38)		Total	T.T.T.Thúy (17/51)
Alsmeier (11/22)		Attack	T.T.T.Thúy (17/35)
Schölzel (4/14)		Block	H.T.K.Trinh (1/2)
Weitzel (2/13)		Serve	N.T.Trinh (1/9)

=== Poland vs Kenya ===
The teams recently faced each other in the 2024 Summer Olympics, where Poland won 3–0. This is the second game between Poland and Kenya in the World Championship with Poland winning in their first meeting in 2006.

25 August 2025; 20:30	Poland	3–1	Kenya	Phuket Municipal Stadium, Phuket; Attendance: 2,734; Referees: Joo-hee Kang (KOR), Sasirapa Pimthongkhonburi (THA)
25 August 2025; 20:30	(25–17, 15–25, 25–15, 25–14); P2 Report			Phuket Municipal Stadium, Phuket; Attendance: 2,734; Referees: Joo-hee Kang (KOR), Sasirapa Pimthongkhonburi (THA)
25 August 2025; 20:30	Scoring leaders			Phuket Municipal Stadium, Phuket; Attendance: 2,734; Referees: Joo-hee Kang (KOR), Sasirapa Pimthongkhonburi (THA)
Czyrniańska (15/49)		Total	Adhiambo (18/55)
Łukasik (12/20)		Attack	Adhiambo (15/38)
Korneluk (3/12)		Block	Ekaru (3/13)
Czyrniańska (6/19)		Serve	Barasa (1/9)

=== Kenya vs Vietnam ===
The teams have never met before in the official match. However, they played a friendly match in 2023, which ended in a 2–2 draw. They recently faced each other in another friendly match ahead of the tournament, where Vietnam won 4–0. This is the first game between Kenya and Vietnam in any tournament, including the World Championship.

27 August 2025; 17:00	Kenya	3–0	Vietnam	Phuket Municipal Stadium, Phuket; Attendance: 1,504; Referees: Sasiprapa Pimthongkhonburi (THA), Ziling Wang (CHN)
27 August 2025; 17:00	(25–23, 25–22, 25–18); P2 Report			Phuket Municipal Stadium, Phuket; Attendance: 1,504; Referees: Sasiprapa Pimthongkhonburi (THA), Ziling Wang (CHN)
27 August 2025; 17:00	Scoring leaders			Phuket Municipal Stadium, Phuket; Attendance: 1,504; Referees: Sasiprapa Pimthongkhonburi (THA), Ziling Wang (CHN)
Adhiambo (19/54)		Total	V.T.N.Quỳnh (12/41)
Adhiambo (15/35)		Attack	V.T.N.Quỳnh (8/28)
Ekaru (6/14)		Block	V.T.N.Quỳnh (2/2)
Sande (2/23)		Serve	V.T.N.Quỳnh (2/11)

=== Poland vs Germany ===
The teams recently faced each other in the 2025 FIVB Women's Volleyball Nations League, where Poland won 3–0. This is the second game between Poland and Germany in the World Championship, with Poland winning in their first meeting in 2022. Prior to 1994, Poland won twice against the former West Germany (in 1956 and 1974) and twice against the former East Germany (in 1962 and 1970), while losing once to East Germany in 1956.

27 August 2025; 20:30	Poland	3–2	Germany	Phuket Municipal Stadium, Phuket; Attendance: 3,217; Referees: Ivaylo Ivanov (BUL), Joo-hee Kang (KOR)
27 August 2025; 20:30	(21–25, 25–15, 19–25, 28–26, 19–17); P2 Report			Phuket Municipal Stadium, Phuket; Attendance: 3,217; Referees: Ivaylo Ivanov (BUL), Joo-hee Kang (KOR)
27 August 2025; 20:30	Scoring leaders			Phuket Municipal Stadium, Phuket; Attendance: 3,217; Referees: Ivaylo Ivanov (BUL), Joo-hee Kang (KOR)
Stysiak (26/72)		Total	Alsmeier (19/75)
Stysiak (23/51)		Attack	Alsmeier (17/49)
Korneluk (4/16)		Block	Weitzel (4/17)
Korneluk (2/18)		Serve	Weitzel (1/18)
