= Jocelyn Urías =

Mexican volleyball player

Personal information
- Born: 16 February 1996 (age 30); Tijuana, Mexico
- Height: 1.90 m (6 ft 3 in)
- Weight: 65 kg (143 lb)
- Spike: 296 cm (117 in)
- Block: 284 cm (112 in)
- Education: Washington State University

Volleyball information
- Position: Middle blocker
- Number: 11 (national team); 6 (college)

National team
2014-present	Mexico
Honours
Women's volleyball
Representing Mexico
Pan American Games
Bronze medal – third place	2023 Santiago	Team

Jocelyn Urías (born 16 February 1996) is a Mexican volleyball player. She is a member of the Mexican women's national volleyball team.

She was part of the Mexican national team at the 2014 FIVB Volleyball Women's World Championship in Italy.

== Clubs ==
- (Mexico) Baja California (2014)
