= Nika Daalderop =

Dutch volleyball player

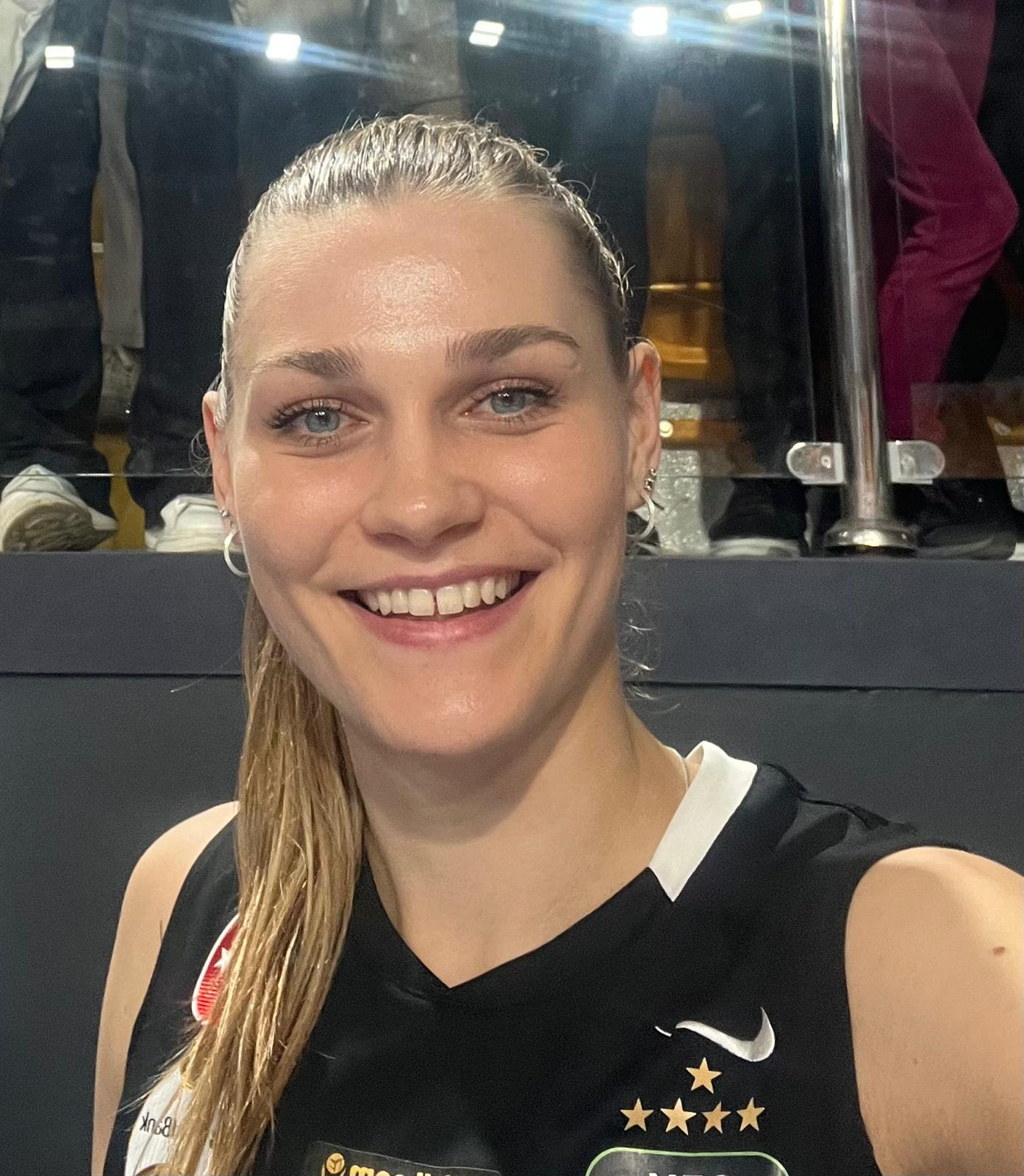
- Daalderop in March 2023

Personal information
- Nationality: Dutch
- Born: 29 November 1998 (age 27); Amsterdam, Netherlands
- Height: 1.90 m (6 ft 3 in)
- Weight: 72 kg (159 lb)
- Spike: 309 cm (122 in)
- Block: 292 cm (115 in)

Volleyball information
- Position: Outside hitter
- Current club: (Turkey) THY S.K
- Number: 16

Career
Years	Teams
2014-2016	(Netherlands) TT Papendal/Arnhem
2016-2017	(Germany) Ladies in Black Aachen
2017-2018	(Germany) Allianz MTV Stuttgart
2018-2020	(Italy) II Bisonte Firenze
2020-2022	(Italy) Igor Gorgonzola Novara
2022-2023	(Italy) Vakıfbank
2023-2025	(Italy) Vero Volley Milano
2025-2026	(Italy) Imoco Volley Congeliano
2026-	(Turkey) THY S.K

National team
Netherlands
Honours
European Championship
Silver medal – second place	2017 Azerbaijan/Georgia
Bronze medal – third place	2023 Belgium/Estonia/Germany/Italy

Nika Daalderop (born 29 November 1998) is a Dutch professional volleyball player for Imoco Volley and the Dutch national team. She played in the Paris 2024 Olympics.

She participated at the 2016 Montreux Volley Masters, 2017 Women's European Volleyball Championship. and 2023 FIVB Volleyball Women's Nations League.
