= Eline Timmerman =

Dutch volleyball player (born 1998)

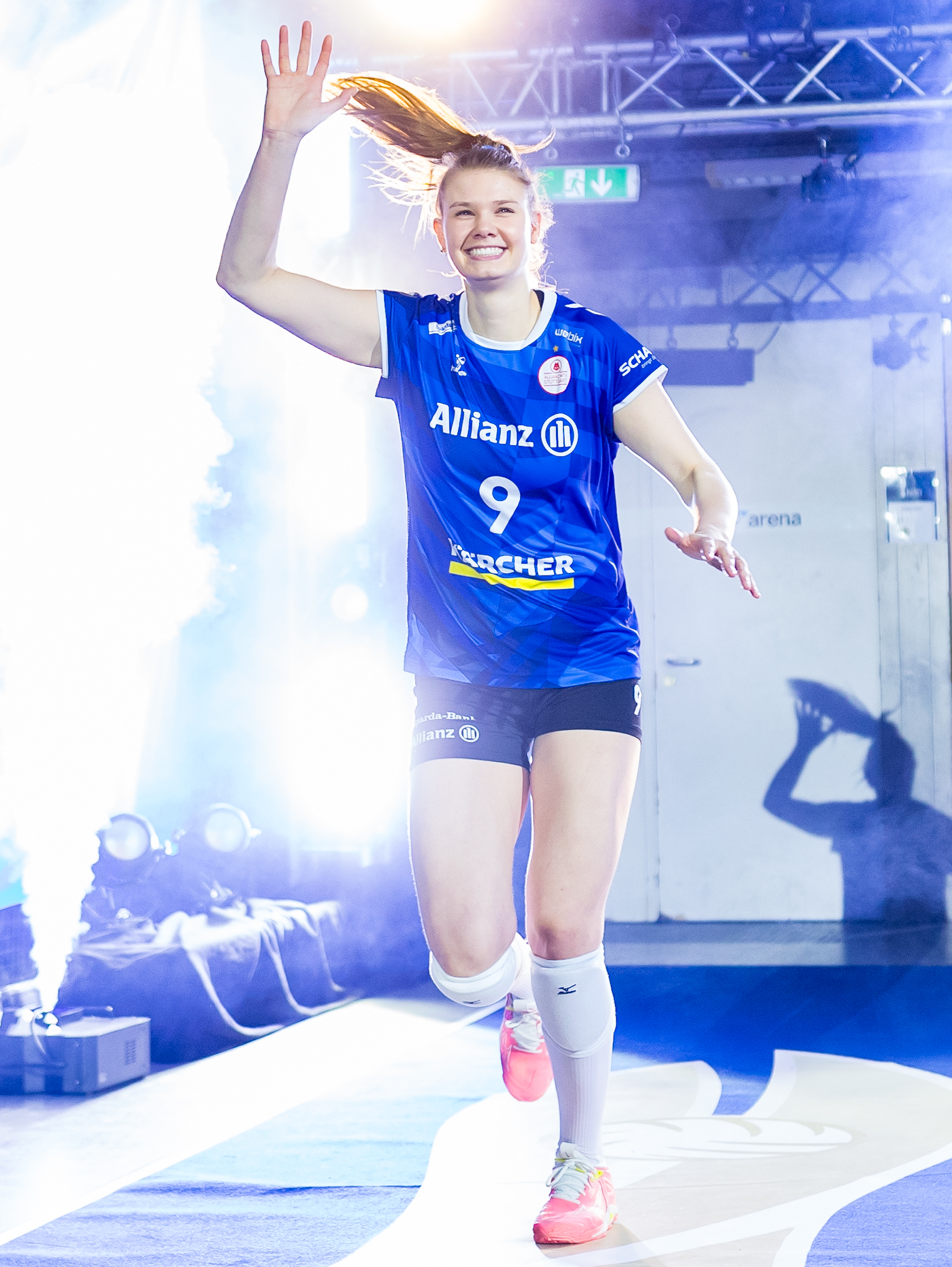
- Eline Timmerman

Personal information
- Nationality: Dutch
- Born: 30 December 1998 (age 27); Rijssen, Netherlands
- Height: 1.93 m (6 ft 4 in)
- Weight: 83 kg (183 lb)
- Spike: 310 cm (122 in)
- Block: 300 cm (118 in)

Volleyball information
- Position: Middle-blocker
- Current club: Panathinaikos
- Number: --

Career
Years	Teams
2013–2014	RIVO Rijssen
2014–2016	TT Papendal Arnhem
2016–2018	Coolen Alterno
2018–2020	Team Eurosped
2020–2021	Ladies in Black Aachen
2021–2024	Allianz MTV Stuttgart
2024–2026	Galatasaray
2026–	Panathinaikos

National team
2019–2026	Netherlands

Eline Timmerman (born 30 December 1998) is a Dutch volleyball player.

== Club career ==
On June 17, 2024, she signed a 1-year loan contract with Galatasaray, one of the Sultanlar Ligi teams.

She signed a new one-year contract with Galatasaray on 15 August 2025.

== International career ==
Timmerman was part of the Netherlands women's national volleyball team sincd 2019, in 2026 of July, she announced her retirement from the national team.

== Honours ==
=== Clubs ===
- 2024–25 BVA Cup Champion, with Galatasaray
- 2025–26 CEV Cup Champion, with Galatasaray
