= Korat Chatchai Hall =

Indoor sporting arena located in Thailand

- โคราช ชาติชาย ฮอลล์
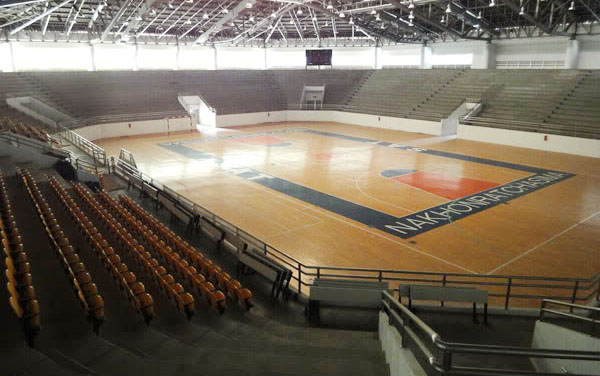
- Interactive map of Korat Chatchai Hall
- Location: Nakhon Ratchasima, Thailand
- Coordinates: 14.926193°N 102.047421°E
- Owner: Sports Authority of Thailand (SAT)
- Capacity: 5,000 seats

Construction
- Opened: 2007

Tenants
- 2007 Southeast Asian Games; 2012 FIFA Futsal World Cup; 2013 FIVB Volleyball Girls' U18 World Championship; 2013 Asian Women's Volleyball Championship; 2018 FIVB Volleyball Women's Nations League

Korat Chatchai Hall (Thai: โคราช ชาติชาย ฮอลล์) is an indoor sporting arena, located in His Majesty the King's 80th Birthday Anniversary, 5 December 2007, Sports Complex, Nakhon Ratchasima, Thailand. The arena name after former Prime Minister of Thailand, Chatichai Choonhavan. The capacity of the arena is 5,000 spectators.

It is used mainly for boxing, basketball, futsal, and volleyball.
