= Chiang Mai International Exhibition and Convention Centre =

Convention centre in Chiang Mai, Thailand

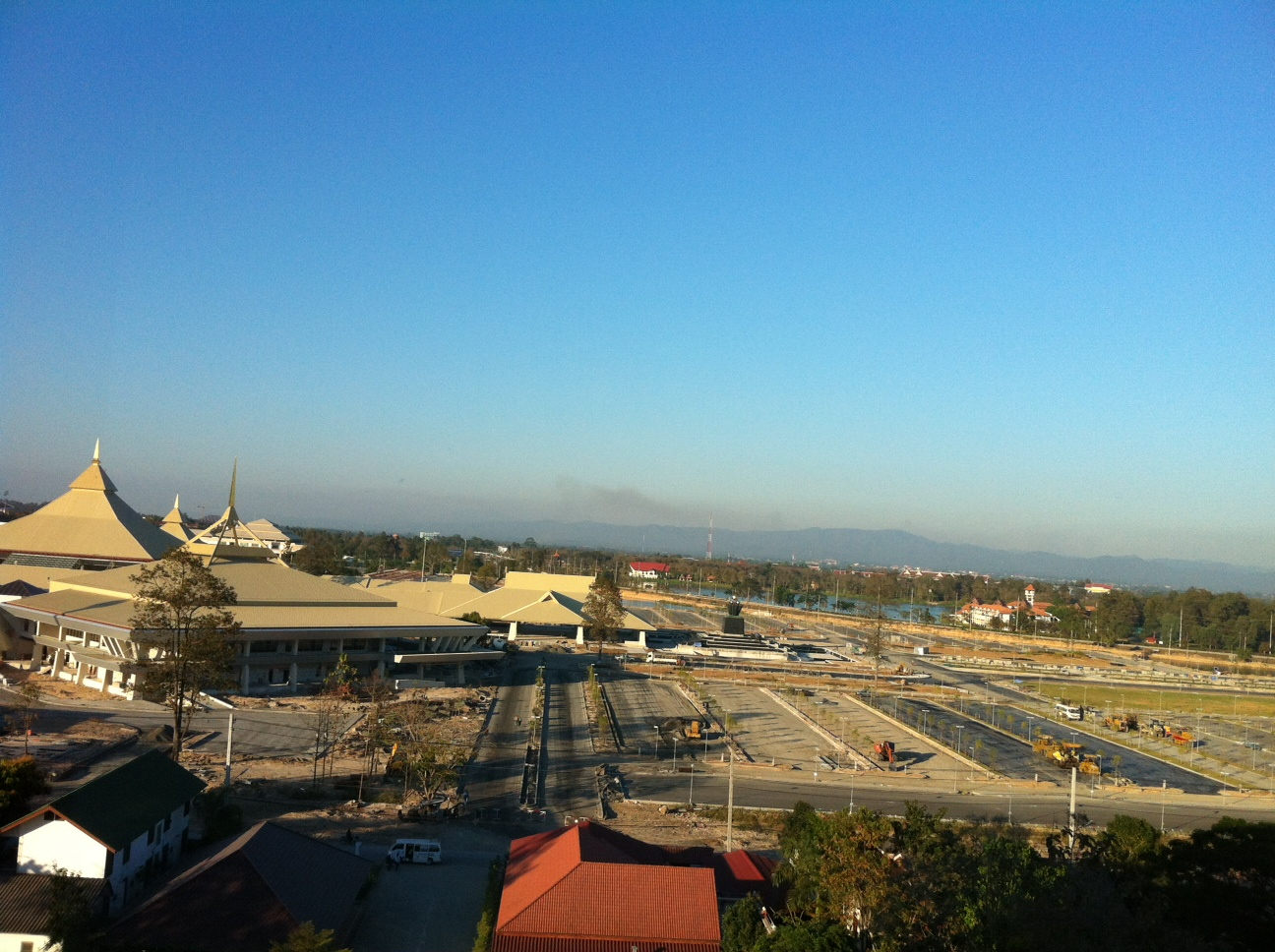
- CMECC on 2012
- Interactive map of Chiang Mai International Exhibition and Convention Centre
- Location: Chang Phueak, Mueang Chiang Mai, Chiang Mai, Thailand
- Coordinates: 18.826000°N 98.963000°E

Construction
- Opened: 2013

Website
- http://www.cmecc-mice.com

Chiang Mai International Exhibition and Convention Centre (CMECC) (Thai: ศูนย์ประชุมและแสดงสินค้านานาชาติ เชียงใหม่) is a convention centre and exhibition hall located in Chiang Mai, Thailand. Operated by the Thai Ministry of Finance's Treasury Department. With 60,000 m^{2} indoor space made it into the largest convention and exhibition building in Thailand outside Bangkok and with 52.16 hectares of total area made it into the largest convention and exhibition center of Southeast Asia
