= Volleyball spiking =

Skill in volleyball (sport)

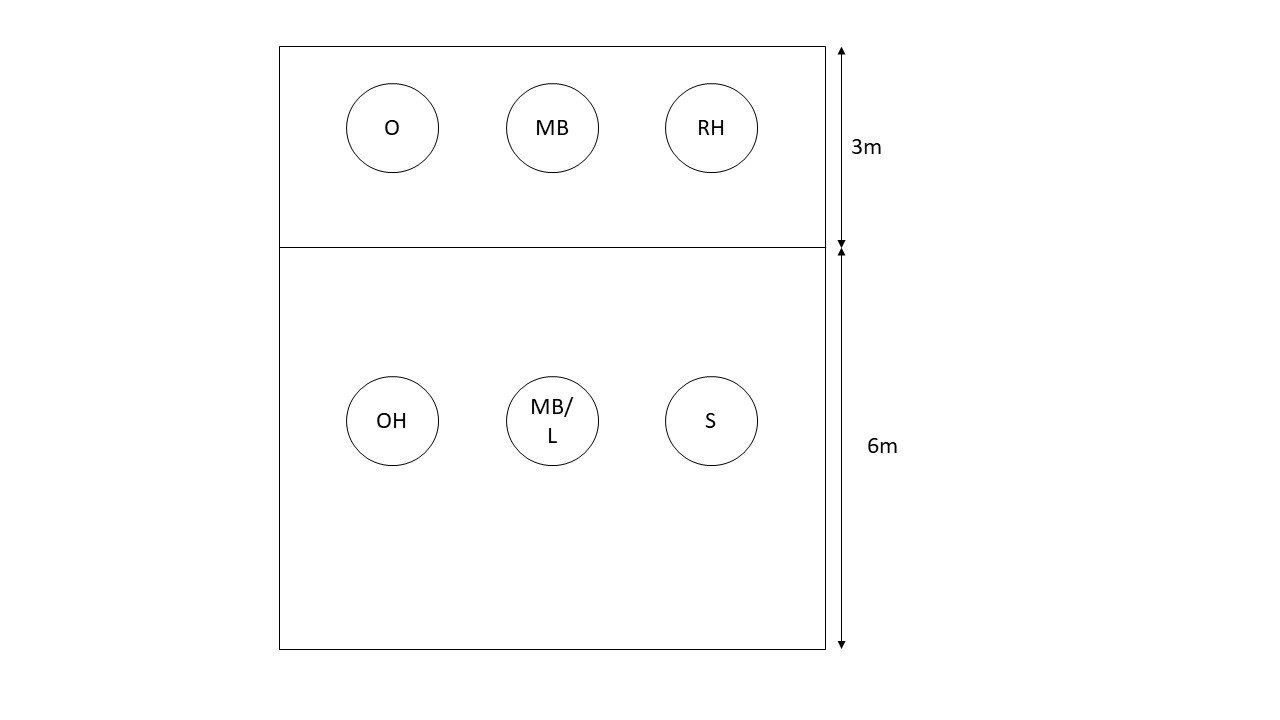
- Diagram of the positions of players on a standard volleyball court, as well as dimension measurements.
- Highest governing body: FIVB
- First played: 1895, Holyoke, Massachusetts, United States

Characteristics
- Contact: None
- Team members: 6
- Mixed-sex: Single
- Type: Team sport, net sport
- Equipment: Volleyball
- Glossary: Glossary of volleyball

Presence
- Country or region: Worldwide
- Olympic: 1964

In volleyball, spiking is the offensive play where a player swings the ball with their palm sharply downwards over the net and into the opposing court, making it difficult for the opposing team to recover the ball. The mechanism of spiking is unique to volleyball, but its counterparts in other sports include slam dunking in basketball, smashing in tennis, or shooting in association football.

Volleyball spiking became very popular in the late 1980s and early 1990s with the massive proliferation of beach volleyball as a popular sport. Well known beach professionals such as Karch Kiraly used the volleyball spike to score devastating points on their opponents as well as wow the crowd with the spike's air of theatricality. "Spiking" as it related to volleyball entered the international and American lexicon through video games, movies and the growing popularity of the AVP.

In 1916 the "set" and "spike" was created in the Philippines where the six-sided play and three hits per side rule were instituted in the following years.

The spike is usually the most effective attack in high levels of play, often used by each team to score points. It is generally on the third and final touch and involves an approach with footwork, a jump, and then an attack. It is a high-velocity shot with explosive movements that send the ball over the net which usually generates the most points during the game. The setter will usually hit the ball to the attacker, called a set, who will choose which attack they want to perform.

== Types ==
=== Regular spike ===
The basic type of spike which, following the jump, the player draws the preferred hitting arm back, and the other arm pointing up, similar to a cocked bow. This is followed by a whip-like action of the hitting arm, striking the ball with the hand at full extension. This spike keeps the elbow above the shoulder throughout the entire swing. Contacting the back of the ball with an open hand in the shape of the ball will create top spin. The spike must be contacted above the net so that the ball be directed steeply downwards.

The hand position helps with avoiding or hitting around the block. An angle or cross court shot involves wrapping the hand around the inside of the ball with the thumb down. To hit cut-back shots, the hand is wrapped around the outside of the ball with the thumb up, the hit requires a full follow through by the arm.

=== Dinks ===
An attack also known as a poke which is used to deceive the opposing blockers is to tip the ball over the blocker's hands onto an open area behind them. Instead of the player swinging hard at the ball, they reach high with an extended elbow, contacting with only the fingertips. Is commonly done when blockers have all paths covered or they are expecting a strong hit. Furthermore, is more effective when blockers are using swing blocking techniques which has a longer hang time that can be taken advantage of.

=== Rolls ===
Similar to the dink where it is usually done to deceive the opposing blockers, the player starts with the complete aggressive approach, then near the jump, extends their arm forward and uses a circular motion to roll the ball over the blockers with top spin into the empty court space behind them, endeavoring to catch the back court defenders off guard.

=== Scoring off the block / tooling / wipes ===
Following the normal approach, a spike which aims for the blocker's hand nearest to the sideline to bounce off of into out of bounds. This counts as a point for the attacking team due to the last contact before out of bounds belonging to the defending team. Is usually executed by higher level players.

=== Back-row attacks ===
Usually, players in the back of the court do not participate in the attacks as they are not allowed to hit the ball in front of the attack line. However, this attack is legal as long as they jump with both feet behind the attack line to attack a ball. Different signals are used to convey what attacks they want to execute with the setter/team such as "A", "B" (or "pipe"), and "C", where they correspond to the left, middle and right side of the court respectfully. Sometimes, the back-row player may receive the serve first, and then quickly position deep enough in the court to conduct a full approach.

=== The slide ===
An attack where the approach is modified and only one foot is used for take-off. If the player is able to take a running approach along the length of the net instead of towards the net, they will be able use a one-foot takeoff effectively.

It is most commonly used by a middle attacker who runs behind the setter and chases a back seat to the end of the court. The momentum of the player horizontally will often carry them out of bounds after the jump, so they have to quickly recover to get back into position for the next play.

In the case of a middle attacker, they will move around the back of the setter and jump driving the knee on the same side as the preferred hitting hand, taking off the other foot. Simultaneously, the players hands will raise and draw into the bow position ready to swing on the ball.

=== Down balls ===
When the ball is not in a position where an attack can be set up on the third hit, a team usually doesn't want to give a free ball to the other side. This is a hit done from the middle of the court similar to a top spin serve without jumping which can be aimed to a certain area on the opposing teams court to still be an effective attack. Players often hit to the deep corner of the opposing team's court. The player quickly moves behind the ball and draw their arms back like a bow. As the ball approaches, the players foot opposite to their preferred hitting arm comes forward, and the hitting arm swings forward contacting with an open palm to create top spin on the ball. Another tactic sometimes employed is to hit the ball towards the opposing team's setter to make them take the first touch, hence stopping them from being able to set the ball on the second touch.

== The approach ==
The approach is essential for getting enough speed and height to execute a spike. The player starts with their arms hanging naturally at their sides, around 3 metres from the net, behind the attack line. The approach consists of three steps, towards the net at a 45-degree angle starting with the opposite leg of the hitting hand with the arms swinging forward, the next step is a running step on the other foot, often called the directional step. This step allows for the player to adjust to the set and position accordingly; the player accelerates towards the net with step and drives their arms back for momentum in the jump. The final step is done by the starting foot to restore balance and so the player can jump off of both feet, transferring the momentum from the previous step into vertical movement. Often a heel strike is incorporated in the last two steps to brake and prevent net violations. Both hands are swung forward to add momentum and to get into position for the spike form.

== Injury risks ==
The significant amount of volleyball landings subjects the lower limb joints of players to high forces, which may cause acute or overuse injuries. A review found 54 acute injuries, 30% of which were to the knee, 17% to the ankle, and 17% to the fingers in 178 professional beach volleyball players during a 7.5 week period. A proper two-footed landing is important as one-footed landings result in one leg absorbing more force, increasing risk of injury.

== Timing ==
A crucial part of the attack, and perhaps the hardest, is the timing. Often new players will struggle with knowing when they should begin their approach towards the ball. Timings of the attack are often referred to as tempos. There are three main tempos: first, second, and third.

First tempo is when the attacker takes all their steps for the approach before the ball is set. This is easier for the attacker, but harder for the setter as they must do a quick set to get the ball to the attacker. A common example of an attack using first tempo is the quick middle attack where the middle blocker finishes their approach and jumps at the same time that the setter contacts the ball. This attack is risky but puts a lot of pressure on the opposing middle blocker to stay in the middle to stop the attack instead of going to either side.

Second tempo is when some of the steps are taken prior to the setter's contact with the ball, and the rest are taken after. This set is less risky than first but still gives the opposing blockers less time to react to the set.

Third tempo attacks are when the attacker takes all their steps after the setter has contacted the ball. Third tempo sets usually occur when the team isn't in proper positions to attack, and more time is needed.
