= 2022 FIVB Women's Volleyball World Championship qualification =

The 2022 FIVB Women's Volleyball World Championship features 24 teams. Three places are allocated to the hosts, the Netherlands and Poland, and the current titleholder, Serbia. Ten places were to be allocated to the top two teams from each of the 2021 Continental Championships that have not yet qualified as host or titleholder. Remaining places were to be allocated to the top eleven teams in the FIVB World Ranking that have not yet qualified through the first three criteria. Following the cancellation of the 2021 Asian Women's Volleyball Championship, AVC allocated two quota spots to China and Japan, the top two teams in the AVC Continental Ranking.

== Qualification summary ==
On 1 March 2022, FIVB declared Russia and Belarus not eligible for international and continental competitions due to the invasion of Ukraine. As a result, Russia was disqualified.

=== Qualified teams ===
Country	Confederation	Qualified as	Qualified on	Previous appearances			Previous best performance
Country	Confederation	Qualified as	Qualified on	Total	First	Last	Previous best performance
Serbia	CEV	Defending champions	20 October 2018	5^{a}	1978	2018	Champions (2018)
Netherlands	CEV	Host countries	12 January 2019	14	1956	2018	4th place (2018)
Poland	CEV	Host countries	12 January 2019	10	1952	2010	Runners-up (1952)
Dominican Republic	NORCECA	2021 NORCECA champions	31 August 2021	8	1974	2018	5th place (2014)
Puerto Rico	NORCECA	2021 NORCECA runners-up	31 August 2021	7	1974	2018	10th place (2002)
Italy	CEV	2021 European champions	4 September 2021	11	1978	2018	Champions (2002)
Turkey	CEV	2021 European third-place finishers^{e}	4 September 2021	4	2006	2018	6th place (2010)
China	AVC	1st AVC ranked team^{f}	5 September 2021	14	1956	2018	Champions (1982, 1986)
Japan	AVC	2nd AVC ranked team^{f}	5 September 2021	16	1960	2018	Champions (1962, 1967, 1974)
Brazil	CSV	2021 South American champions	19 September 2021	16	1956	2018	Runners-up (1994, 2006, 2010)
Colombia	CSV	2021 South American runners-up	19 September 2021	0	None		None
Cameroon	CAVB	2021 African champions	19 September 2021	3	2006	2018	21st place (2006, 2014, 2018)
Kenya	CAVB	2021 African runners-up	19 September 2021	6	1994	2018	13th place (1994, 1998)
United States	NORCECA	1st World ranked non-qualified team	19 September 2021	16	1956	2018	Champions (2014)
~~VFR~~^{b}	CEV	~~2nd World ranked non-qualified team~~	~~19 September 2021~~	~~17^{b}~~	1952	2018	Champions (1952, 1956, 1960, 1970, 1990, 2006, 2010)
Germany	CEV	3rd World ranked non-qualified team	19 September 2021	16^{c}	1956	2018	4th place (1974, 1986)
Belgium	CEV	4th World ranked non-qualified team	19 September 2021	3	1956	2014	11th place (2014)
South Korea	AVC	5th World ranked non-qualified team	19 September 2021	12	1967	2018	3rd place (1967, 1974)
Bulgaria	CEV	6th World ranked non-qualified team	19 September 2021	12	1952	2018	4th place (1952)
Canada	NORCECA	7th World ranked non-qualified team	19 September 2021	9	1974	2018	11th place (1974, 1982)
Thailand	AVC	8th World ranked non-qualified team	19 September 2021	5	1998	2018	13th place (1998, 2010, 2018)
Argentina	CSV	9th World ranked non-qualified team	19 September 2021	6	1960	2018	8th place (1960)
Czech Republic	CEV	10th World ranked non-qualified team	19 September 2021	11^{d}	1952	2010	3rd place (1952, 1960)
Kazakhstan	AVC	11th World ranked non-qualified team	19 September 2021	4	2006	2018	15th place (2006)
Croatia	CEV	Reallocation	18 March 2022	3	1998	2014	6th place (1998)

Notes
^{a} Competed as SFR Yugoslavia in 1978 (1 time) and as Serbia and Montenegro in 2006 (1 time); 3 appearances as Serbia.
^{b} Competed as Soviet Union from 1952 to 1990 (10 times); 7 appearances as Russia. Russia was suspended to compete under it national title due to violating WADA regulation. Later, the team was removed from all FIVB and continental competitions due to 2022 Russian invasion of Ukraine.
^{c} Competed as East Germany from 1956 to 1990 (7 times) and as West Germany from 1956 to 1990 (8 times); 7 appearances as Germany.
^{d} Competed as Czechoslovakia from 1952 to 1986 (8 times); 3 appearances as Czech Republic.
^{e} Turkey qualified from the continental championship due to the runners-up, Serbia, have qualified as defending champions.
^{f} 2021 Asian Championship was cancelled, The continental spots decided by AVC ranking.

=== Timelines ===
Confederation	Tournament		Date	Venue	Teams
AVC (Asia and Oceania)	~~2019 Asian Championship~~		~~17–25 August 2019~~	~~(South Korea) Seoul~~	~~13~~
AVC (Asia and Oceania)	~~2021 Asian Championship~~		~~15–22 May 2022~~	~~(Philippines) San Fernando, Pampanga~~	~~7~~
CAVB (Africa)	2021 African Nations' Championship		12–19 September 2021	(Rwanda) Kigali	9
CEV (Europe)	EuroVolley 2019		23 August–8 September 2019	(Hungary) Budapest, (Poland) Łódź, (Slovakia) Bratislava, (Turkey) Ankara	21+3
CEV (Europe)	EuroVolley 2021 qualification	Pool A	10–15 May 2021	(Belarus) Minsk	3
CEV (Europe)	EuroVolley 2021 qualification	Pool B	7–16 May 2021	(Portugal) Matosinhos, (Georgia (country)) Tbilisi	4
CEV (Europe)	EuroVolley 2021 qualification	Pool C	7–15 May 2021	(Greece) Larissa, (Austria) Graz	4
CEV (Europe)	EuroVolley 2021 qualification	Pool D	7–15 May 2021	(Montenegro) Podgorica, (Slovakia) Nitra	4
CEV (Europe)	EuroVolley 2021 qualification	Pool E	7–16 May 2021	(France) Belfort, (Hungary) Budapest	4
CEV (Europe)	EuroVolley 2021 qualification	Pool F	6–16 May 2021	(Latvia) Daugavpils, (Bosnia and Herzegovina) Zenica	4
CEV (Europe)	EuroVolley 2021		18 August–4 September 2021	(Bulgaria) Plovdiv, (Croatia) Zadar, (Romania) Cluj-Napoca, (Serbia) Belgrade	21+3
CSV (South America)	2021 South American Championship		15–19 September 2021	(Colombia) Barrancabermeja	5
NORCECA (North America)	2021 NORCECA Championship		26–31 August 2021	(Mexico) Guadalajara	7

== Host countries ==
FIVB reserved berths for the 2022 FIVB Women's Volleyball World Championship host countries to participate in the tournament.

- Netherlands from CEV (Europe)
- Poland from CEV (Europe)

== Current world champions ==
FIVB reserved a berth for the 2018 FIVB Women's Volleyball World Championship champions to participate in the tournament.

- Serbia from CEV (Europe)

== CEV (Europe) ==
=== First round (EuroVolley 2019) ===
Of the 24 qualified teams, top eight teams excluding EuroVolley 2021 host countries qualified for the third round.

==== Pool A ====
Pos	Team	Pld	Pts
1	Serbia	5	15
2	Turkey	5	11
3	Bulgaria	5	7
4	Greece	5	6
5	Finland	5	4
6	France	5	2

Source: CEV EuroVolley

==== Pool B ====
Pos	Team	Pld	Pts
1	Italy	5	13
2	Poland	5	12
3	Belgium	5	11
4	Slovenia	5	5
5	Ukraine	5	4
6	Portugal	5	0

Source: CEV EuroVolley

==== Pool C ====
Pos	Team	Pld	Pts
1	Netherlands	5	15
2	Azerbaijan	5	10
3	Croatia	5	10
4	Romania	5	6
5	Hungary	5	3
6	Estonia	5	1

Source: CEV EuroVolley

==== Pool D ====
Pos	Team	Pld	Pts
1	Germany	5	14
2	Russia	5	13
3	Slovakia	5	8
4	Spain	5	5
5	Switzerland	5	4
6	Belarus	5	1

Source: CEV EuroVolley

==== Ranking of the top twelve teams ====
Pos	Team	Pld	Pts
1	Turkey	9	20
2	Italy	9	22
3	Poland	9	17
4	Netherlands	7	18
5	Germany	7	18
6	Russia	7	16
7	Belgium	6	11
8	Azerbaijan	6	10
9	Slovakia	6	8
10	Greece	6	6
11	Spain	6	5
12	Slovenia	6	5

Source: CEV EuroVolley

=== Second round (EuroVolley 2021 qualification) ===
Of the 23 qualified teams, winners and runners-up of each group qualified for the third round.

==== Pool A ====
Pos	Team	Pld	Pts
1	Belarus	0	0
2	Switzerland	0	0
3	Estonia	0	0

Source: CEV EuroVolley

==== Pool B ====
Pos	Team	Pld	Pts
1	Ukraine	0	0
2	Portugal	0	0
3	Georgia	0	0
4	Sweden	0	0

Source: CEV EuroVolley

==== Pool C ====
Pos	Team	Pld	Pts
1	Spain	0	0
2	Greece	0	0
3	Austria	0	0
4	Norway	0	0

Source: CEV EuroVolley

==== Pool D ====
Pos	Team	Pld	Pts
1	Slovakia	0	0
2	Finland	0	0
3	Montenegro	0	0
4	Kosovo	0	0

Source: CEV EuroVolley

==== Pool E ====
Pos	Team	Pld	Pts
1	Hungary	0	0
2	France	0	0
3	Israel	0	0
4	Denmark	0	0

Source: CEV EuroVolley

==== Pool F ====
Pos	Team	Pld	Pts
1	Slovenia	0	0
2	Czech Republic	0	0
3	Bosnia and Herzegovina	0	0
4	Latvia	0	0

Source: CEV EuroVolley

=== Third round (EuroVolley 2021) ===
Of the 24 qualified teams, winner and runner-up excluding the Netherlands, Poland, and Serbia qualified for the 2022 FIVB Women's Volleyball World Championship.

== CSV (South America) ==
=== First round (2021 South American Championship) ===
Of the 5 participating teams, winners and runners-up qualified for the 2022 FIVB Women's Volleyball World Championship.

Rank	Team
1st place, gold medalist(s)	Brazil
2nd place, silver medalist(s)	Colombia
3rd place, bronze medalist(s)	Argentina
4	Peru
5	Chile

== CAVB (African) ==
=== First round (2021 Women's African Nations Volleyball Championship) ===
Of the 9 participating teams, winners and runners-up qualified for the 2022 FIVB Women's Volleyball World Championship.

Rank	Team
1st place, gold medalist(s)	Cameroon
2nd place, silver medalist(s)	Kenya
3rd place, bronze medalist(s)	Morocco
4	Nigeria
5	Tunisia
6	DR Congo
7	Burundi
8	Senegal
DSQ	~~Rwanda~~

== NORCECA (North, Central America and Caribbean) ==
=== First round (2021 Women's NORCECA Volleyball Championship) ===
Of the 7 participating teams, winners and runners-up qualified for the 2022 FIVB Women's Volleyball World Championship.

Rank	Team
1st place, gold medalist(s)	Dominican Republic
2nd place, silver medalist(s)	Puerto Rico
3rd place, bronze medalist(s)	Canada
4	United States
5	Mexico
6	Costa Rica
7	Trinidad and Tobago
