= 2027 FIVB Women's Volleyball World Cup =

Volleyball tournament in Canada and United States

Tournament details
- Host countries: United States; Canada
- Cities: Anaheim; Montreal; Omaha; Orlando; Quebec City
- Dates: August 20 – September 5
- Teams: 32 (from 5 confederations)
- Venue: 5 (in 5 host cities)

The 2027 FIVB Women's Volleyball World Cup is the upcoming 21st staging of the FIVB Women's Volleyball World Cup, contested by the senior women's national teams of the members of the Fédération Internationale de Volleyball (FIVB). It is scheduled to be held in the United States and Canada from August 20 to September 5, 2027.

Following the FIVB's announcement on March 5, 2026, the 2027 tournament will be the first edition held under the event's newly rebranded name, World Cup.

The tournament will be the first World Cup to be hosted in North America since 1974 and the second edition to be co-hosted, after 2022.

Italy are the defending champions.

== Host selection ==
The three following bids were placed:

- United States and Canada
- Italy
- Turkey

The bidding procedure to host the 2025 and 2027 FIVB World Championships began in August 2023. National federations had until August 31, 2023, to register interest. On September 26, 2025, the United States and Canada were awarded the hosting rights at the FIVB meeting in Manila.

== Qualification ==
The host countries Canada and United States qualified for the competition as well as the defending champions Italy. The top three teams from each of the 2026 Continental Championships secured qualification. The final 14 places (reduced by 1 due to there being two co-hosts) belonged to top 14 teams as per FIVB World Ranking (October 2, 2026) who had not yet qualified.

Team	Method of qualification	Date of qualification	Appearance(s)				Previous best performance (Note: Bold text indicates they hosted that edition.)
Team	Method of qualification	Date of qualification	Total	First	Last	Streak	Previous best performance
United States	Hosts	September 26, 2025	19th	1956	2025	17	**Champions** (2014)
Canada	Hosts	September 26, 2025	12th	1974	2025	6	10th place (2022)
Italy	Defending champions	September 7, 2025	14th	1978	2025	14	**Champions** (2002, 2025)
Cuba	2026 NORCECA 3rd placers	August 24, 2026	14th	1970	2025	2	**Champions** (1978, 1994, 1998)
Dominican Republic (Note: As Canada and the United States automatically qualified as World Cup hosts, their qualification spots were reallocated to the Dominican Republic and Puerto Rico after they finished the NORCECA Championship in fourth and fifth place, respectively.)	2026 NORCECA 4th placers	August 23, 2026	11th	1974	2025	9	5th place (2014)
Puerto Rico	2026 NORCECA 5th placers	August 26, 2026	10th	1974	2025	8	10th place (2002)
Thailand	2026 AVC champions	August 29, 2026	8th	1998	2025	6	13th place (1998, 2010, 2018, 2022, **2025**)
China	2026 AVC runners-up	August 29, 2026	17th	1956	2025	15	**Champions** (1982, 1986)
Japan	2026 AVC 3rd placers	August 30, 2026	19th	1956	2025	19	**Champions** (1962, **1967**, 1974)
Turkey	2026 CEV champions	September 3, 2026	7th	2006	2025	7	Runners-up (2025)
Serbia (Note: Competed as SFR Yugoslavia in 1978 (1 time) and as Serbia and Montenegro in 2006 (1 time).)	2026 CEV 3rd placers	September 2, 2026	8th	1978	2025	6	**Champions** (2018, 2022)
Poland (Note: As Italy had already qualified as the defending champions, Poland secured their berth after finishing fourth at the 2026 CEV Women's EuroVolley.)	2026 CEV 4th placers	September 3, 2026	13th	1952	2025	3	Runners-up (1952)
Egypt	2026 CAVB champions	September 3, 2026	5th	1990	2025	2	16th place (1990)
Kenya	2026 CAVB runners-up	September 3, 2026	9th	1994	2025	4	13th place (1994, 1998)
Cameroon	2026 CAVB 3rd placers	September 4, 2026	6th	2006	2025	5	21st place (2006, 2014, 2018)
Brazil	2026 CSV champions	September 12, 2026	19th	1956	2025	16	Runners-up (**1994**, 2006, 2010, 2022)
Argentina	2026 CSV runners-up	September 12, 2026	9th	1960	2025	5	8th place (1960)
Colombia	2026 CSV 3rd placers	September 12, 2026	3rd	2022	2025	3	21st place (2022)
Netherlands	1st World ranked non-qualified team	October 2, 2026	17th	1956	2025	11	4th place (2018)
Russia (Note: Competed as Soviet Union from 1952 to 1990 (10 times); 7 appearances as Russia.)	2nd World ranked non-qualified team	October 2, 2026	18th	1952	2018	1	**Champions** (1952, 1956, 1960, 1970, 1990, 2006, 2010)
Germany (Note: Competed as East Germany from 1956 to 1990 (7 times) and as West Germany from 1956 to 1990 (8 times); 9 appearances as Germany.)	3rd World ranked non-qualified team	October 2, 2026	19th	1956	2025	14	4th place (1974, 1986)
Czech Republic (Note: Competed as Czechoslovakia from 1952 to 1986 (8 times); 5 appearances as Czech Republic.)	4th World ranked non-qualified team	October 2, 2026	14th	1952	2025	3	3rd place (1952, 1960)
Belgium	5th World ranked non-qualified team	October 2, 2026	6th	1956	2025	3	9th place (2022)
France	6th World ranked non-qualified team	October 2, 2026	5th	1952	2025	2	7th place (1952)
Slovenia	7th World ranked non-qualified team	October 2, 2026	2nd	2025	2025	2	16th place (2025)
Sweden	8th World ranked non-qualified team	October 2, 2026	2nd	2025	2025	2	19th place (2025)
Mexico	9th World ranked non-qualified team	October 2, 2026	10th	1970	2025	2	10th place (**1974**)
Ukraine	10th World ranked non-qualified team	October 2, 2026	3rd	1994	2025	2	9th place (1994)
Greece	11th World ranked non-qualified team	October 2, 2026	3rd	2002	2025	2	10th place (2002)
South Korea	12th World ranked non-qualified team	October 2, 2026	14th	1967	2022	1	3rd place (1967, 1974)
Bulgaria	13th World ranked non-qualified team	October 2, 2026	15th	1952	2025	5	4th place (1952)
Switzerland	14th World ranked non-qualified team	October 2, 2026	1st	Debut		1	—N/a

== Format ==
The tournament will be played in two rounds: a preliminary round (pool phase) and a final round (direct elimination phase). During the preliminary round, 32 qualified teams were divided into eight pools, labeled A through H, with four teams in each pool. In this phase, every team within a pool will compete against the other three teams once. After the pool phase, the top two teams from each pool will advance to the final round, creating a round of 16 teams. Simultaneously, the bottom two teams from each pool will be ranked from 17th to 32nd based on the Team Combined Ranking System.

The final round will follow a single-elimination format with the round of 16 match-ups determined by each team's pool and ranking position. The initial pairings—A1 versus H2, H1 versus A2, D1 versus E2, E1 versus D2, B1 versus G2, G1 versus B2, C1 versus F2, and F1 versus B2—ensures that the teams from pools A, D, E, and H will not encounter the teams from pools B, C, F, and G until the third place or the final match. As the competition progresses, the round of 16 losers will be ranked from 9th to 16th according to the Team Combined Ranking System, while the winners will advance to the quarterfinals. The quarterfinals will follow the same pattern, with losing teams ranked from 5th to 8th, and victorious teams moving to the next stage of the competition. In the semifinals, the losers will compete for the third place, while the winners will face each other in the final match.

== Pools composition ==
=== Seeding ===
Teams were seeded using the FIVB World Rankings on October 2, 2026 (shown in parentheses).

Seeded teams	Pot 1	Pot 2	Pot 3
Italy (1); Brazil (2); Turkey (3); United States (hosts) (4); Poland (5); Japan (6); China (7); Canada (hosts) (8)	Serbia (9); Netherlands (10); Russia (11); Germany (12); Thailand (13); Dominican Republic (14); Czech Republic (15); Belgium (16)	France (17); Slovenia (18); Sweden (19); Argentina (20); Mexico (21); Ukraine (22); Colombia (23); Kenya (24)	Greece (25); Cuba (26); Puerto Rico (27); South Korea (28); Bulgaria (29); Switzerland (30); Egypt (39); Cameroon (41)

=== Draw ===
The draw took place on October 26, 2026, in Los Angeles. The eight pools were formed through a random draw, with one team selected from each of the three pots and assigned to a pool based on their pot placement. Eight teams had their positions predetermined: host nations USA and Canada, positioned as D1 and G1, and the top six teams in the World Rankings, each occupying the first position in their respective pools: Italy (A1), Brazil (B1), Turkey (C1), Poland (E1), Japan (F1), and China (H1).

Pool A
Pos.	Team
A1	Italy
A2	Belgium
A3	Colombia
A4	Puerto Rico

Pool B
Pos.	Team
B1	Brazil
B2	Czech Republic
B3	Kenya
B4	South Korea

Pool C
Pos.	Team
C1	Turkey
C2	Dominican Republic
C3	France
C4	Egypt

Pool D
Pos.	Team
D1	United States
D2	Thailand
D3	Mexico
D4	Greece

Pool E
Pos.	Team
E1	Poland
E2	Germany
E3	Slovenia
E4	Cuba

Pool F
Pos.	Team
F1	Japan
F2	Russia
F3	Argentina
F4	Bulgaria

Pool G
Pos.	Team
G1	Canada
G2	Serbia
G3	Ukraine
G4	Cameroon

Pool H
Pos.	Team
H1	China
H2	Netherlands
H3	Sweden
H4	Switzerland

== Venues ==
Anaheim, Omaha and Orlando were confirmed as the American host cities on September 17, 2026. The finals are scheduled to be held at the Honda Center in Anaheim, as the test event for the 2028 Summer Olympics.

Montreal and Québec City were confirmed as the Canadian host cities on October 1, 2026, completing the roster of host cities.

Distribution of tournament
Anaheim will host quarterfinals, semifinals and finals.
Omaha, Orlando, Montreal and Quebec City will host preliminary round games and round of 16 games.

(United States) Anaheim	(United States) Omaha	(United States) Orlando
Honda Center	CHI Health Center Arena	Kia Center
Capacity: 18,336	Capacity: 18,300	Capacity: 18,846
(Canada) Montreal	2027 FIVB Women's Volleyball World Cup is located in North America	
Bell Centre	2027 FIVB Women's Volleyball World Cup is located in North America	
Capacity: 20,962	2027 FIVB Women's Volleyball World Cup is located in North America	
(Canada) Québec City	2027 FIVB Women's Volleyball World Cup is located in North America	
Centre Vidéotron	2027 FIVB Women's Volleyball World Cup is located in North America	
Capacity: 18,259	2027 FIVB Women's Volleyball World Cup is located in North America	

== Marketing ==
=== Partnerships ===
In June 2026, Volleyball World and the tournament's organizing committee appointed Horizon Sports & Experiences (HS&E) as the exclusive sponsorship sales and media rights agency in the United States. Under this agreement, HS&E oversees U.S. sponsorship inventory and media rights sales to attract brand partners and broadcasters. The partnership is aimed at capitalizing on the growing market for women's sports and the tournament's North American debut across the U.S. and Canada.

=== Broadcasting ===
In July 2026, Scripps Sports acquired the exclusive U.S. media rights for the 2027 tournament in a deal facilitated by HS&E. The agreement dictates that all 64 matches of the 32-team tournament will be broadcast across Ion Television and Scripps Sports platforms in both English and Spanish, marking the widest U.S. television distribution in the event's history. In addition to broadcasting, Scripps Sports, Volleyball World, and HS&E established a commercial collaboration to jointly develop title and presenting sponsorship packages.
