= 2022 FIVB Women's Volleyball World Championship =

International volleyball competition

2022 FIVB Women's World Championship
Wereldkampioenschap volleybal vrouwen 2022 Mistrzostwa Świata w Piłce Siatkowej Kobiet 2022
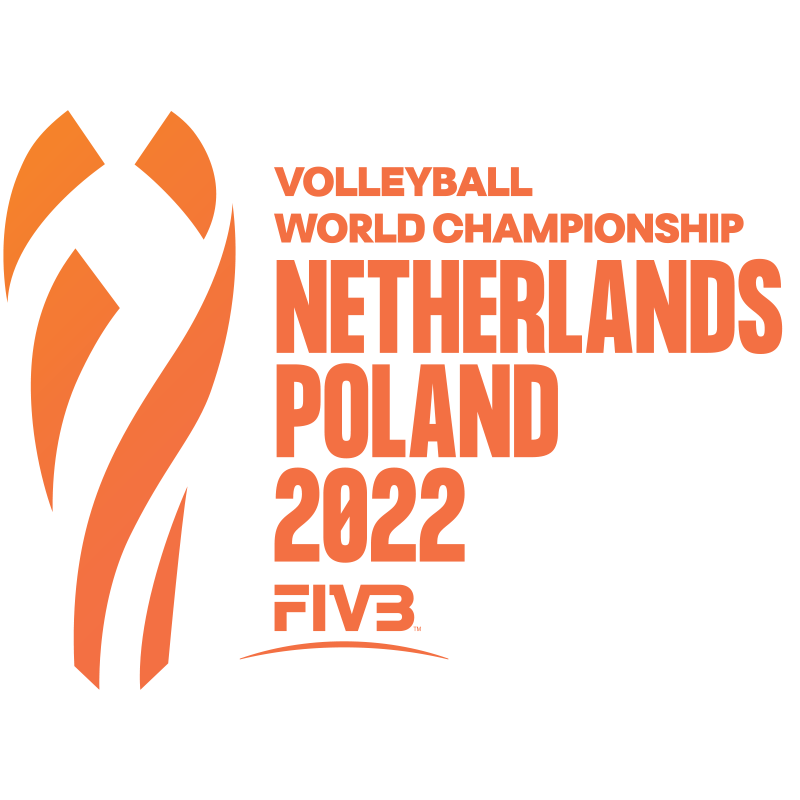

Tournament details
- Host countries: Netherlands; Poland
- Cities: Apeldoorn; Arnhem; Gdańsk; Gliwice; Łódź; Rotterdam
- Dates: 23 September – 15 October
- Teams: 24 (from 5 confederations)
- Venue: 6 (in 6 host cities)
- Officially opened by: Willem-Alexander and Andrzej Duda

Final positions
- Champions: Serbia (2nd title)
- Runners-up: Brazil
- Third place: Italy
- Fourth place: United States

Tournament awards
- MVP: (Serbia) Tijana Bošković
- Best Setter: (Serbia) Bojana Drča
- Best OH: (Brazil) Gabriela Guimarães (Italy) Miriam Sylla
- Best MB: (Brazil) Ana Carolina da Silva (Italy) Anna Danesi
- Best OPP: (Serbia) Tijana Bošković
- Best Libero: (Serbia) Teodora Pušić

Tournament statistics
- Matches played: 100
- Attendance: 231,515 (2,315 per match)
- Best scorer: (Italy) Paola Egonu (275 points)
- Best spiker: (Serbia) Tijana Bošković (55.58%)
- Best blocker: (Brazil) Ana Carolina da Silva (4.92 Ave.)
- Best server: (Italy) Caterina Bosetti (1.50 Ave.)
- Best setter: (Poland) Joanna Wołosz (14.00 Ave.)
- Best digger: (Italy) Monica De Gennaro (14.00 Ave.)
- Best receiver: (China) Li Yingying (46.99%)

The 2022 FIVB Women's Volleyball World Championship was the 19th staging of the FIVB Women's Volleyball World Championship, contested by the senior women's national teams of the members of the Fédération Internationale de Volleyball (FIVB). The Netherlands and Poland were dual hosts for this event.

Serbia won their second title for the consecutive edition, beating Brazil in straight sets. Italy took the bronze medal defeating USA. Tijana Bošković was again the recipient of the MVP award of the tournament.

== Host selection ==
On 19 January 2019, FIVB announced that Netherlands and Poland were selected as dual hosts for this event. It is the first time that the women's World Championship has been hosted by two countries.

== Qualification ==
The host countries Netherlands and Poland automatically qualified for the competition as well as the current world champions Serbia. The top two teams from each of the 2021 Continental Championships secured qualification. The final 11 places belonged to top 11 teams as per FIVB World Ranking who had not yet qualified.

On 1 March 2022, FIVB declared Russia and Belarus ineligible to compete in international and continental competitions due to the 2022 Russian invasion of Ukraine. As a result, Russia were out of the championship. After Russia was removed from the competition, Croatia was invited to compete as the next highest ranked team in the World Ranking.

Country	Confederation	Qualified as	Qualified on	Previous appearances			Previous best performance
Country	Confederation	Qualified as	Qualified on	Total	First	Last	Previous best performance
Serbia	CEV	Defending champions	20 October 2018	5^{a}	1978	2018	Champions (2018)
Netherlands	CEV	Host countries	12 January 2019	14	1956	2018	4th place (2018)
Poland	CEV	Host countries	12 January 2019	10	1952	2010	Runners-up (1952)
Dominican Republic	NORCECA	2021 NORCECA champions	31 August 2021	8	1974	2018	5th place (2014)
Puerto Rico	NORCECA	2021 NORCECA runners-up	31 August 2021	7	1974	2018	10th place (2002)
Italy	CEV	2021 European champions	4 September 2021	11	1978	2018	Champions (2002)
Turkey	CEV	2021 European third-place finishers^{e}	4 September 2021	4	2006	2018	6th place (2010)
China	AVC	1st AVC ranked team^{f}	5 September 2021	14	1956	2018	Champions (1982, 1986)
Japan	AVC	2nd AVC ranked team^{f}	5 September 2021	16	1960	2018	Champions (1962, 1967, 1974)
Brazil	CSV	2021 South American champions	19 September 2021	16	1956	2018	Runners-up (1994, 2006, 2010)
Colombia	CSV	2021 South American runners-up	19 September 2021	0	None		None
Cameroon	CAVB	2021 African champions	19 September 2021	3	2006	2018	21st place (2006, 2014, 2018)
Kenya	CAVB	2021 African runners-up	19 September 2021	6	1994	2018	13th place (1994, 1998)
United States	NORCECA	1st World ranked non-qualified team	19 September 2021	16	1956	2018	Champions (2014)
~~VFR~~^{b}	CEV	~~2nd World ranked non-qualified team~~	~~19 September 2021~~	~~17^{b}~~	1952	2018	Champions (1952, 1956, 1960, 1970, 1990, 2006, 2010)
Germany	CEV	3rd World ranked non-qualified team	19 September 2021	16^{c}	1956	2018	4th place (1974, 1986)
Belgium	CEV	4th World ranked non-qualified team	19 September 2021	3	1956	2014	11th place (2014)
South Korea	AVC	5th World ranked non-qualified team	19 September 2021	12	1967	2018	3rd place (1967, 1974)
Bulgaria	CEV	6th World ranked non-qualified team	19 September 2021	12	1952	2018	4th place (1952)
Canada	NORCECA	7th World ranked non-qualified team	19 September 2021	9	1974	2018	11th place (1974, 1982)
Thailand	AVC	8th World ranked non-qualified team	19 September 2021	5	1998	2018	13th place (1998, 2010, 2018)
Argentina	CSV	9th World ranked non-qualified team	19 September 2021	6	1960	2018	8th place (1960)
Czech Republic	CEV	10th World ranked non-qualified team	19 September 2021	11^{d}	1952	2010	3rd place (1952, 1960)
Kazakhstan	AVC	11th World ranked non-qualified team	19 September 2021	4	2006	2018	15th place (2006)
Croatia	CEV	Reallocation	18 March 2022	3	1998	2014	6th place (1998)

Notes
^{a} Competed as SFR Yugoslavia in 1978 (1 time) and as Serbia and Montenegro in 2006 (1 time); 3 appearances as Serbia.
^{b} Competed as Soviet Union from 1952 to 1990 (10 times); 7 appearances as Russia. Russia was suspended to compete under it national title due to violating WADA regulation. Later, the team was removed from all FIVB and continental competitions due to 2022 Russian invasion of Ukraine.
^{c} Competed as East Germany from 1956 to 1990 (7 times) and as West Germany from 1956 to 1990 (8 times); 7 appearances as Germany.
^{d} Competed as Czechoslovakia from 1952 to 1986 (8 times); 3 appearances as Czech Republic.
^{e} Turkey qualified from the continental championship due to the runners-up, Serbia, have qualified as defending champions.
^{f} 2021 Asian Championship was cancelled, The continental spots decided by AVC ranking.

== Venues ==
First round	Second round	Final round	2022 FIVB Women's Volleyball World Championship is located in Netherlands
Arnhem	Rotterdam	Apeldoorn	2022 FIVB Women's Volleyball World Championship is located in Netherlands
GelreDome Arena (GDA) (Note: The event in Arnhem had three volleyball courts installed inside the stadium, allowing three games to be played simultaneously in the first days of competition (where all participating countries were concentrated until September 26, 2022).)	Ahoy Arena (AHA)	Omnisport Arena (OMA)	2022 FIVB Women's Volleyball World Championship is located in Netherlands
Capacity: 21,248	Capacity: 16,426	Capacity: 6,525	2022 FIVB Women's Volleyball World Championship is located in Netherlands
First round	First round, Second round	Final round	2022 FIVB Women's Volleyball World Championship is located in Poland
Gdańsk	Łódź	Gliwice	2022 FIVB Women's Volleyball World Championship is located in Poland
Ergo Arena (ERA)	Atlas Arena (ATA) (Note: The event in Łódź will also have several games played at the Łódź Sports Arena, an auxiliary volleyball court in the same complex as the Łódź Atlas Arena, with a capacity of 3,000 people.)	Gliwice Arena (GLA)	2022 FIVB Women's Volleyball World Championship is located in Poland
Capacity: 11,409	Capacity: 13,805	Capacity: 13,752	2022 FIVB Women's Volleyball World Championship is located in Poland

== Format ==
=== First round ===
In the first round, the 24 teams were spread across four pools of six teams playing in a round-robin system. The top four teams from each pool advanced to the second round.

=== Second round ===
In the second round, the 16 teams were allocated in two pools of eight teams (top teams from first round pools A and D in one and top teams from pools B and C in the other). Once again a round-robin system was used in each pool, teams coming from the same first round pool (therefore already played each other) only played against opponents from a different first round pool. The second round standings took the results in the first and second rounds into account. The top four teams of each group advanced to the final round.

=== Final round ===
The top four teams of each pool played in quarterfinals. The winners advanced to semifinals. The semifinals winners advanced to compete for the World Championship title. The losers faced each other in the third place match.

== Pools composition ==
=== First round ===
Teams were seeded in the first two positions of each pool following the Serpentine system according to their FIVB World Ranking as per end of 2021. FIVB reserved the right to seed the hosts as heads of pool A and B. The better ranked hosted team (10) allocated to pool A, and another team (12) allocated to pool B. All teams not seeded were drawn to take other available positions in the remaining lines following the World Ranking.

Seeded Teams	Pot 1	Pot 2
Netherlands (Co-hosts); Poland (Co-hosts); United States (1); Brazil (2)	China (3); Turkey (4); Serbia (5); Italy (6)	Dominican Republic (7); Japan (9); Germany (11); Belgium (13)

Pot 3	Pot 4	Pot 5
South Korea (14); Bulgaria (15); Colombia (16); Puerto Rico (17)	Canada (18); Thailand (19); Cameroon (20); Argentina (21)	Czech Republic (22); Kazakhstan (23); Croatia (24); Kenya (28)

Draw

Pool A	Pool B	Pool C	Pool D
Netherlands	Poland	United States	Brazil
Italy	Turkey	Serbia	China
Belgium	Dominican Republic	Germany	Japan
Puerto Rico	South Korea	Bulgaria	Colombia
Cameroon	Thailand	Canada	Argentina
Kenya	Croatia	Kazakhstan	Czech Republic

=== Second round ===
Pool E
Italy (Pool A 1st)	China (Pool D 1st)
Belgium (Pool A 2nd)	Japan (Pool D 2nd)
Netherlands (Pool A 3rd)	Brazil (Pool D 3rd)
Puerto Rico (Pool A 4th)	Argentina (Pool D 4th)

Pool F
Turkey (Pool B 1st)	Serbia (Pool C 1st)
Thailand (Pool B 2nd)	United States (Pool C 2nd)
Dominican Republic (Pool B 3rd)	Canada (Pool C 3rd)
Poland (Pool B 4th)	Germany (Pool C 4th)

== Pool standing procedure ==
1. Total number of victories (matches won, matches lost)
2. In the event of a tie, the following first tiebreaker will apply: The teams will be ranked by the most point gained per match as follows:
  - Match won 3–0 or 3–1: 3 points for the winner, 0 points for the loser
  - Match won 3–2: 2 points for the winner, 1 point for the loser
  - Match forfeited: 3 points for the winner, 0 points (0–25, 0–25, 0–25) for the loser
3. If teams are still tied after examining the number of victories and points gained, then the FIVB will examine the results in order to break the tie in the following order:
  - Set quotient: if two or more teams are tied on the number of points gained, they will be ranked by the quotient resulting from the division of the number of all set won by the number of all sets lost.
  - Points quotient: if the tie persists based on the set quotient, the teams will be ranked by the quotient resulting from the division of all points scored by the total of points lost during all sets.
  - If the tie persists based on the point quotient, the tie will be broken based on the team that won the match of the Round Robin Phase between the tied teams. When the tie in point quotient is between three or more teams, these teams ranked taking into consideration only the matches involving the teams in question.

== First round ==
- All times are Central European Summer Time (UTC+02:00).
- The top four teams in each pool qualified for the second phase.

=== Pool A ===
Pos	Team	Pld	W	L	Pts	SW	SL	SR	SPW	SPL	SPR	Qualification
1	Italy	5	5	0	15	15	2	7.500	431	328	1.314	Second round
2	Belgium	5	4	1	12	13	4	3.250	417	331	1.260	Second round
3	Netherlands	5	3	2	9	11	7	1.571	413	357	1.157	Second round
4	Puerto Rico	5	2	3	6	7	10	0.700	371	382	0.971	Second round
5	Kenya	5	1	4	3	4	12	0.333	289	383	0.755	
6	Cameroon	5	0	5	0	0	15	0.000	237	377	0.629	

Source: FIVB

Date	Time	Venue		Score		Set 1	Set 2	Set 3	Set 4	Set 5	Total	Report
23 Sep	20:00	GDA	Netherlands	3–0	Kenya	25–11	25–17	25–11			75–39	P2 Report
24 Sep	14:00	GDA	Belgium	3–0	Puerto Rico	25–15	27–25	25–15			77–55	P2 Report
24 Sep	15:00	GDA	Italy	3–0	Cameroon	25–10	25–12	25–16			75–38	P2 Report
25 Sep	13:00	GDA	Belgium	3–0	Kenya	25–15	25–14	25–11			75–40	P2 Report
25 Sep	16:00	GDA	Netherlands	3–0	Cameroon	25–11	25–20	25–13			75–44	P2 Report
26 Sep	18:00	GDA	Italy	3–0	Puerto Rico	28–26	25–21	26–24			79–71	P2 Report
27 Sep	18:00	GDA	Italy	3–1	Belgium	21–25	30–28	29–27	25–9		105–89	P2 Report
27 Sep	20:00	GDA	Cameroon	0–3	Kenya	20–25	25–27	19–25			64–77	P2 Report
28 Sep	20:00	GDA	Netherlands	3–1	Puerto Rico	23–25	25–20	25–16	25–15		98–76	P2 Report
29 Sep	18:00	GDA	Italy	3–0	Kenya	25–15	25–23	25–17			75–55	P2 Report
29 Sep	20:00	GDA	Puerto Rico	3–0	Cameroon	25–23	25–16	25–11			75–50	P2 Report
30 Sep	20:00	GDA	Netherlands	1–3	Belgium	16–25	23–25	26–24	25–27		90–101	P2 Report
1 Oct	16:00	GDA	Puerto Rico	3–1	Kenya	25–15	19–25	25–18	25–20		94–78	P2 Report
2 Oct	13:00	GDA	Belgium	3–0	Cameroon	25–8	25–19	25–14			75–41	P2 Report
2 Oct	16:00	GDA	Netherlands	1–3	Italy	13–25	25–22	16–25	21–25		75–97	P2 Report

=== Pool B ===
Pos	Team	Pld	W	L	Pts	SW	SL	SR	SPW	SPL	SPR	Qualification
1	Turkey	5	4	1	11	14	7	2.000	468	396	1.182	Second round
2	Thailand	5	4	1	10	12	7	1.714	419	392	1.069	Second round
3	Dominican Republic	5	3	2	11	13	7	1.857	457	401	1.140	Second round
4	Poland	5	3	2	10	12	7	1.714	441	382	1.154	Second round
5	South Korea	5	1	4	3	3	13	0.231	283	398	0.711	
6	Croatia	5	0	5	0	2	15	0.133	326	425	0.767	

Source: FIVB

Date	Time	Venue		Score		Set 1	Set 2	Set 3	Set 4	Set 5	Total	Report
23 Sep	18:00	GDA	Poland	3–1	Croatia	25–19	21–25	25–23	25–15		96–82	P2 Report
24 Sep	13:00	GDA	Turkey	2–3	Thailand	25–17	29–31	25–22	19–25	13–15	111–110	P2 Report
24 Sep	18:30	GDA	Dominican Republic	3–0	South Korea	25–19	25–12	25–15			75–46	P2 Report
27 Sep	14:00	ERA	Turkey	3–0	South Korea	25–14	25–13	25–13			75–40	P2 Report
27 Sep	17:30	ERA	Dominican Republic	3–0	Croatia	25–20	25–15	25–21			75–56	P2 Report
27 Sep	20:30	ERA	Poland	3–0	Thailand	25–17	25–17	25–17			75–51	P2 Report
28 Sep	14:00	ERA	Thailand	3–0	Croatia	25–18	25–13	25–21			75–52	P2 Report
28 Sep	17:30	ERA	Turkey	3–2	Dominican Republic	21–25	25–21	25–18	16–25	15–13	102–102	P2 Report
28 Sep	20:30	ERA	Poland	3–0	South Korea	25–17	25–18	25–16			75–51	P2 Report
29 Sep	14:00	ERA	South Korea	0–3	Thailand	13–25	15–25	14–25			42–75	P2 Report
29 Sep	17:30	ERA	Turkey	3–0	Croatia	25–14	25–12	25–12			75–38	P2 Report
29 Sep	20:30	ERA	Poland	1–3	Dominican Republic	25–18	22–25	21–25	21–25		89–93	P2 Report
1 Oct	14:00	ERA	Dominican Republic	2–3	Thailand	29–31	25–16	25–21	22–25	11–15	112–108	P2 Report
1 Oct	17:30	ERA	South Korea	3–1	Croatia	25–21	27–29	27–25	25–23		104–98	P2 Report
1 Oct	20:30	ERA	Poland	2–3	Turkey	25–22	23–25	22–25	25–18	11–15	106–105	P2 Report

=== Pool C ===
Pos	Team	Pld	W	L	Pts	SW	SL	SR	SPW	SPL	SPR	Qualification
1	Serbia	5	5	0	14	15	2	7.500	412	326	1.264	Second round
2	United States	5	4	1	12	12	4	3.000	381	303	1.257	Second round
3	Canada	5	3	2	8	9	9	1.000	393	376	1.045	Second round
4	Germany	5	2	3	7	8	10	0.800	394	397	0.992	Second round
5	Bulgaria	5	1	4	4	8	12	0.667	417	464	0.899	
6	Kazakhstan	5	0	5	0	0	15	0.000	244	375	0.651	

Source: FIVB

Date	Time	Venue		Score		Set 1	Set 2	Set 3	Set 4	Set 5	Total	Report
24 Sep	19:30	GDA	United States	3–0	Kazakhstan	25–16	25–13	25–22			75–51	P2 Report
25 Sep	19:00	GDA	Germany	3–1	Bulgaria	25–22	21–25	25–23	25–21		96–91	P2 Report
25 Sep	20:00	GDA	Serbia	3–0	Canada	25–23	25–16	25–20			75–59	P2 Report
26 Sep	15:30	GDA	Germany	3–0	Kazakhstan	25–15	25–18	25–21			75–54	P2 Report
26 Sep	16:00	GDA	Serbia	3–2	Bulgaria	25–21	22–25	25–27	25–21	15–9	112–103	P2 Report
26 Sep	21:00	GDA	United States	3–0	Canada	25–19	26–24	25–15			76–58	P2 Report
29 Sep	13:00	ATA	Canada	3–0	Kazakhstan	25–14	25–16	25–11			75–41	P2 Report
29 Sep	16:00	ATA	Serbia	3–0	Germany	25–23	25–22	25–23			75–68	P2 Report
29 Sep	19:00	ATA	United States	3–1	Bulgaria	25–14	23–25	25–11	25–15		98–65	P2 Report
30 Sep	13:00	ATA	Serbia	3–0	Kazakhstan	25–13	25–17	25–10			75–40	P2 Report
30 Sep	16:00	ATA	Bulgaria	1–3	Canada	21–25	27–25	20–25	15–25		83–100	P2 Report
30 Sep	19:00	ATA	United States	3–0	Germany	25–17	25–13	26–24			76–54	P2 Report
1 Oct	13:00	ATA	Bulgaria	3–0	Kazakhstan	25–18	25–22	25–18			75–58	P2 Report
1 Oct	16:00	ATA	Germany	2–3	Canada	25–12	26–24	23–25	18–25	9–15	101–101	P2 Report
1 Oct	19:00	ATA	United States	0–3	Serbia	20–25	23–25	13–25			56–75	P2 Report

=== Pool D ===
Pos	Team	Pld	W	L	Pts	SW	SL	SR	SPW	SPL	SPR	Qualification
1	China	5	4	1	12	13	3	4.333	395	352	1.122	Second round
2	Japan	5	4	1	12	12	4	3.000	387	327	1.183	Second round
3	Brazil	5	4	1	12	13	5	2.600	431	356	1.211	Second round
4	Argentina	5	2	3	5	6	12	0.500	377	413	0.913	Second round
5	Czech Republic	5	1	4	3	5	13	0.385	375	422	0.889	
6	Colombia	5	0	5	1	3	15	0.200	335	430	0.779	

Source: FIVB

Date	Time	Venue		Score		Set 1	Set 2	Set 3	Set 4	Set 5	Total	Report
24 Sep	20:30	GDA	Brazil	3–1	Czech Republic	25–20	25–16	22–25	25–18		97–79	P2 Report
25 Sep	14:00	GDA	China	3–0	Argentina	25–23	25–22	25–20			75–65	P2 Report
25 Sep	14:15	GDA	Japan	3–0	Colombia	25–20	25–22	25–17			75–59	P2 Report
26 Sep	14:15	GDA	Japan	3–0	Czech Republic	25–15	25–20	25–12			75–47	P2 Report
26 Sep	18:30	GDA	Brazil	3–0	Argentina	25–19	25–13	25–21			75–53	P2 Report
27 Sep	14:00	GDA	China	3–0	Colombia	25–16	25–21	25–16			75–53	P2 Report
28 Sep	14:15	GDA	China	3–0	Japan	28–26	25–17	29–27			82–70	P2 Report
28 Sep	15:00	GDA	Brazil	3–0	Colombia	25–14	25–12	25–20			75–46	P2 Report
28 Sep	18:00	GDA	Argentina	3–1	Czech Republic	25–20	20–25	25–22	25–22		95–89	P2 Report
30 Sep	14:00	GDA	China	3–0	Czech Republic	25–19	25–22	27–25			77–66	P2 Report
30 Sep	14:15	GDA	Brazil	1–3	Japan	22–25	19–25	25–17	20–25		86–92	P2 Report
30 Sep	18:00	GDA	Colombia	2–3	Argentina	25–19	17–25	29–27	20–25	8–15	99–111	P2 Report
1 Oct	14:00	GDA	Brazil	3–1	China	23–25	25–17	25–22	25–22		98–86	P2 Report
1 Oct	18:00	GDA	Colombia	1–3	Czech Republic	22–25	13–25	25–19	18–25		78–94	P2 Report
2 Oct	14:15	GDA	Japan	3–0	Argentina	25–17	25–19	25–17			75–53	P2 Report

== Second round ==
- All times are Central European Summer Time (UTC+02:00).
- The top four teams qualified for the final phase.
- The results of all the matches in the first round were taken into account for this round.

=== Pool E ===
Pos	Team	Pld	W	L	Pts	SW	SL	SR	SPW	SPL	SPR	Qualification
1	Italy	9	8	1	25	26	6	4.333	783	627	1.249	Final round
2	Brazil	9	8	1	23	25	8	3.125	793	631	1.257	Final round
3	Japan	9	7	2	21	22	8	2.750	707	628	1.126	Final round
4	China	9	7	2	20	22	8	2.750	712	642	1.109	Final round
5	Belgium	9	5	4	15	18	13	1.385	708	667	1.061	
6	Netherlands	9	4	5	13	16	17	0.941	733	680	1.078	
7	Puerto Rico	9	3	6	9	10	20	0.500	616	690	0.893	
8	Argentina	9	2	7	5	8	24	0.333	644	755	0.853	

Source: FIVB

Date	Time	Venue		Score		Set 1	Set 2	Set 3	Set 4	Set 5	Total	Report
4 Oct	14:15	AHA	Japan	3–1	Belgium	21–25	25–20	25–16	25–22		96–83	P2 Report
4 Oct	17:15	AHA	Italy	2–3	Brazil	20–25	25–22	25–22	21–25	15–17	106–111	P2 Report
4 Oct	20:15	AHA	Netherlands	3–1	Argentina	22–25	25–18	25–12	25–13		97–68	P2 Report
5 Oct	14:15	AHA	Italy	3–1	Japan	20–25	25–20	25–14	25–15		95–74	P2 Report
5 Oct	17:15	AHA	China	3–0	Puerto Rico	25–15	25–19	25–21			75–55	P2 Report
5 Oct	20:15	AHA	Belgium	3–0	Argentina	25–16	25–23	25–23			75–62	P2 Report
6 Oct	16:00	AHA	Brazil	3–0	Puerto Rico	25–11	25–13	25–15			75–39	P2 Report
6 Oct	20:00	AHA	China	3–2	Netherlands	22–25	25–21	25–15	18–25	15–12	105–98	P2 Report
7 Oct	14:15	AHA	Japan	3–0	Puerto Rico	25–16	25–19	25–21			75–56	P2 Report
7 Oct	17:15	AHA	Italy	3–0	Argentina	25–19	25–18	25–17			75–54	P2 Report
7 Oct	20:15	AHA	Brazil	3–0	Netherlands	25–19	25–19	25–20			75–58	P2 Report
8 Oct	13:30	AHA	Italy	3–0	China	26–24	25–16	25–20			76–60	P2 Report
8 Oct	17:00	AHA	Brazil	3–1	Belgium	26–28	25–17	25–11	25–16		101–72	P2 Report
9 Oct	12:30	AHA	China	3–0	Belgium	25–18	25–18	27–25			77–61	P2 Report
9 Oct	15:30	AHA	Japan	3–0	Netherlands	25–23	25–23	25–21			75–67	P2 Report
9 Oct	18:30	AHA	Puerto Rico	3–1	Argentina	20–25	25–15	25–20	25–23		95–83	P2 Report

=== Pool F ===
Pos	Team	Pld	W	L	Pts	SW	SL	SR	SPW	SPL	SPR	Qualification
1	Serbia	9	9	0	26	27	2	13.500	714	570	1.253	Final round
2	United States	9	7	2	20	21	11	1.909	745	652	1.143	Final round
3	Turkey	9	6	3	17	21	13	1.615	775	699	1.109	Final round
4	Poland	9	6	3	17	21	14	1.500	792	720	1.100	Final round
5	Canada	9	5	4	14	17	18	0.944	767	741	1.035	
6	Dominican Republic	9	4	5	15	19	17	1.118	789	764	1.033	
7	Thailand	9	4	5	11	16	19	0.842	757	769	0.984	
8	Germany	9	3	6	11	14	20	0.700	735	767	0.958	

Source: FIVB

Date	Time	Venue		Score		Set 1	Set 2	Set 3	Set 4	Set 5	Total	Report
4 Oct	15:00	ATA	Thailand	1–3	Canada	19–25	21–25	25–23	22–25		87–98	P2 Report
4 Oct	17:30	ATA	United States	3–1	Dominican Republic	21–25	25–19	25–20	25–14		96–78	P2 Report
4 Oct	19:00	ATA	Turkey	3–0	Germany	25–21	25–18	25–21			75–60	P2 Report
4 Oct	20:30	ATA	Serbia	3–0	Poland	26–24	25–22	25–18			76–64	P2 Report
5 Oct	15:00	ATA	Thailand	1–3	Germany	19–25	22–25	25–18	23–25		89–93	P2 Report
5 Oct	17:30	ATA	Turkey	3–0	Canada	25–22	26–24	28–26			79–72	P2 Report
5 Oct	19:00	ATA	Serbia	3–0	Dominican Republic	26–24	25–20	25–17			76–61	P2 Report
5 Oct	20:30	ATA	United States	0–3	Poland	23–25	20–25	18–25			61–75	P2 Report
7 Oct	15:00	ATA	Serbia	3–0	Thailand	25–23	25–17	25–15			75–55	P2 Report
7 Oct	17:30	ATA	United States	3–1	Turkey	25–22	21–25	25–20	25–22		96–89	P2 Report
7 Oct	19:00	ATA	Dominican Republic	3–1	Germany	19–25	25–18	25–22	25–18		94–83	P2 Report
7 Oct	20:30	ATA	Poland	3–2	Canada	25–18	19–25	16–25	25–23	15–5	100–96	P2 Report
8 Oct	15:00	ATA	United States	3–2	Thailand	23–25	21–25	25–19	27–25	15–13	111–107	P2 Report
8 Oct	17:30	ATA	Serbia	3–0	Turkey	25–20	25–21	25–23			75–64	P2 Report
8 Oct	19:00	ATA	Dominican Republic	2–3	Canada	25–18	23–25	17–25	27–25	7–15	99–108	P2 Report
8 Oct	20:30	ATA	Poland	3–2	Germany	26–24	20–25	25–18	26–28	15–10	112–105	P2 Report

== Final round ==
- All times are Central European Summer Time (UTC+02:00).

Quarterfinals
11 October – Apeldoorn
1E Italy	3
4E China	1
11 October – Apeldoorn
2E Brazil	3
3E Japan	2
11 October – Gliwice
1F Serbia	3
4F Poland	2
11 October – Gliwice
2F United States	3
3F Turkey	0

Semifinals
13 October – Apeldoorn
Italy	1
Brazil	3
12 October – Gliwice
Serbia	3
United States	1

Final
15 October – Apeldoorn
Brazil	0
Serbia	3
3rd place match
15 October – Apeldoorn
Italy	3
United States	0

=== Quarterfinals ===
Date	Time	Venue		Score		Set 1	Set 2	Set 3	Set 4	Set 5	Total	Report
11 Oct	17:00	OMA	Italy	3–1	China	25–16	25–22	13–25	25–17		88–80	P2 Report
11 Oct	17:30	GLA	United States	3–0	Turkey	25–22	25–15	25–20			75–57	P2 Report
11 Oct	20:00	OMA	Brazil	3–2	Japan	18–25	18–25	25–22	27–25	15–13	103–110	P2 Report
11 Oct	20:30	GLA	Serbia	3–2	Poland	21–25	25–21	25–19	24–26	16–14	111–105	P2 Report

=== Semifinals ===
Date	Time	Venue		Score		Set 1	Set 2	Set 3	Set 4	Set 5	Total	Report
12 Oct	20:30	GLA	Serbia	3–1	United States	25–21	25–20	17–25	25–23		92–89	P2 Report
13 Oct	20:00	OMA	Italy	1–3	Brazil	23–25	25–22	24–26	19–25		91–98	P2 Report

=== 3rd place match ===
Date	Time	Venue		Score		Set 1	Set 2	Set 3	Set 4	Set 5	Total	Report
15 Oct	16:00	OMA	Italy	3–0	United States	25–20	25–15	27–25			77–60	P2 Report

=== Final ===
Date	Time	Venue		Score		Set 1	Set 2	Set 3	Set 4	Set 5	Total	Report
15 Oct	20:00	OMA	Brazil	0–3	Serbia	24–26	22–25	17–25			63–76	P2 Report

== Final standing ==
Rank	Team
1st place, gold medalist(s)	Serbia
2nd place, silver medalist(s)	Brazil
3rd place, bronze medalist(s)	Italy
4	United States
5	Japan
6	China
7	Poland
8	Turkey
9	Belgium
10	Canada
11	Dominican Republic
12	Netherlands
13	Thailand
14	Germany
15	Puerto Rico
16	Argentina
17	Bulgaria
18	Czech Republic
19	Kenya
20	South Korea
21	Colombia
22	Croatia
23	Kazakhstan
24	Cameroon

Qualified for the 2025 World Championship

Source: WCH 2022 final standings

2022 Women's World champions

Serbia
2nd title

Team roster
Bianka Buša, Katarina Lazović, Bojana Drča, Mina Popović, Slađana Mirković, Brankica Mihajlović, Teodora Pušić, Ana Bjelica, Maja Aleksić, Jovana Stevanović, Aleksandra Jegdić, Tijana Bošković (c), Bojana Milenković, Sara Lozo
Head coach
Daniele Santarelli

== Awards ==
- Most valuable player
  Tijana Bošković (SRB)
- Best setter
  Bojana Drča (SRB)
- Best outside spikers
  Gabriela Guimarães (BRA)
  Miriam Sylla (ITA)
- Best opposite spiker
  Tijana Bošković (SRB)
- Best middle blockers
  Ana Carolina da Silva (BRA)
  Anna Danesi (ITA)
- Best libero
  Teodora Pušić (SRB)

== Statistics leaders ==
Statistics leaders correct as of final round.

Best Scorers
	Player	Spikes	Blocks	Serves	Total
1	(Italy) Paola Egonu	244	23	8	275
2	(Poland) Magdalena Stysiak	197	35	9	241
3	(Serbia) Tijana Bošković	219	13	8	240
4	(Belgium) Britt Herbots	203	11	8	222
5	(Brazil) Gabriela Guimarães	200	6	8	214

Best Spikers
	Player	Spikes	Faults	Shots	%	Total
1	(Italy) Paola Egonu	244	77	173	49.39	494
2	(Serbia) Tijana Bošković	219	49	126	55.58	394
3	(Belgium) Britt Herbots	203	56	248	40.04	507
4	(Brazil) Gabriela Guimarães	200	48	187	45.98	435
5	(Poland) Magdalena Stysiak	197	67	156	46.90	420

Best Blockers
	Player	Blocks	Faults	Rebounds	Avg	Total
1	(Brazil) Ana Carolina da Silva	59	48	55	4.92	162
2	(Italy) Anna Danesi	42	30	81	3.50	153
3	(Puerto Rico) Neira Ortiz	39	39	43	4.33	121
4	(Poland) Magdalena Stysiak	35	28	1	3.50	64
5	(Poland) Agnieszka Kąkolewska	34	33	10	3.40	77

Best Servers
	Player	Aces	Faults	Hits	Avg	Total
1	(Italy) Caterina Bosetti	18	12	114	1.50	144
2	(United States) Andrea Drews	18	25	116	1.50	159
3	(United States) Jordyn Poulter	14	10	96	1.17	120
4	(Japan) Mayu Ishikawa	14	15	96	1.40	125
5	(Dominican Republic) Gaila González	13	24	94	1.44	131

Best Setters
	Player	Running	Faults	Still	Avg	Total
1	(Italy) Alessia Orro	144	7	930	12.00	1081
2	(Poland) Joanna Wołosz	140	5	813	14.00	958
3	(China) Diao Linyu	135	11	782	13.50	928
4	(Argentina) Victoria Mayer	126	3	836	14.00	965
5	(Japan) Nanami Seki	117	4	1029	11.70	1150

Best Diggers
	Player	Digs	Faults	Receptions	Avg	Total
1	(Italy) Monica De Gennaro	168	49	24	14.00	241
2	(Brazil) Gabriela Guimarães	106	41	25	8.83	172
3	(Italy) Caterina Bosetti	98	26	8	8.17	132
4	(Japan) Kotona Hayashi	91	39	19	9.10	149
5	(Netherlands) Myrthe Schoot	90	34	30	10.00	154

Best Receivers
	Player	Excellents	Faults	Serve	%	Total
1	(Brazil) Gabriela Guimarães	101	4	139	41.39	244
2	(Italy) Miriam Sylla	96	9	217	29.81	322
3	(China) Li Yingying	86	9	88	46.99	183
4	(Argentina) Yamila Nizetich	84	14	170	31.34	268
5	(Brazil) Priscila Daroit	80	17	151	32.26	248

== See also ==
- 2022 FIVB Men's Volleyball World Championship
