= 2026 Women's NORCECA Volleyball Championship =

North American women's volleyball tournament

Campeonato NORCECA de Voleibol Femenino de 2026 (Spanish)

Tournament details
- Host country: Dominican Republic
- City: Santo Domingo
- Dates: August 21–26
- Teams: 8 (from 1 confederation)
- Venue: 1 (in 1 host city)

Final positions
- Champions: Canada (1st title)
- Runners-up: United States
- Third place: Cuba
- Fourth place: Dominican Republic

Tournament awards
- MVP: (Canada) Kacey Jost

Tournament statistics
- Matches played: 26
- Attendance: 23,725 (913 per match)

The 2026 Women's NORCECA Volleyball Championship was the 29th edition of the Women's NORCECA Volleyball Championship, a biennial international volleyball tournament organised by the North, Central America and Caribbean Volleyball Confederation (NORCECA) for national women's volleyball teams in North America, Central America and the Caribbean. The tournament took place from August 21 to 26. It was held in Santo Domingo, Dominican Republic, marking the sixth time the competition has been held in the country, after 1977, 1985, 1995, 2001 and 2003.

The top three finishers, excluding the United States and Canada, qualified for the 2027 FIVB Women's Volleyball World Cup. The top four teams, excluding United States, also advanced to a separate tournament to decide the continental spot to the 2028 Summer Olympics.

The Dominican Republic was the three-time defending champion, most recently defeating the United States 3–2 in the 2023 final in Quebec City.

Canada won their first title after defeating the United States 3–2 in the final. For the first time in 15 years, Cuba entered the podium after defeating the Dominican Republic 3–0 in the third place match. The competition witnessed the first 25–0 set in international volleyball history, with Mexico winning the third set against Trinidad and Tobago by that scoreline.

== Year change ==
On June 22, 2023, the Fédération Internationale de Volleyball (FIVB) announced a comprehensive restructuring of the international calendar for the 2025–2028 cycle. As part of this overhaul, continental championships shifted from odd-numbered years to even-numbered years, beginning in 2026. The structural change was implemented to prioritize athlete health and recovery by reducing calendar congestion, as well as to streamline the qualification pathways for major global tournaments such as the FIVB World Cup and the Olympic Games.

== Teams ==
Eight teams are taking part. All teams from the 2023 edition are present alongside Trinidad and Tobago, who appeared in 2021. Brackets indicate their world ranking before the tournament.

Qualified teams for the 2026 Women's NORCECA Volleyball Championship.

- Canada (11)
- Costa Rica (52)
- Cuba (34)
- Dominican Republic ^{H} (13)
- Mexico (22)
- Puerto Rico (25)
- Trinidad and Tobago (unranked)
- United States (4)

=== Pools composition ===
Pool A	Pool B
United States	Dominican Republic (H)
Canada	Puerto Rico
Mexico	Cuba
Trinidad and Tobago	Costa Rica

=== Schedule ===
Schedule
Round	Matchday	Date
Preliminary round	All matches	August 21–23, 2026
Knockout stage
Knockout stage	Quarterfinals	August 24, 2026
Knockout stage	Semifinals	August 25, 2026
Knockout stage	3rd place & Final	August 26, 2026

== Venue ==
All games are being played at the Pabellón Ricardo Gioriver Arias, in Santo Domingo, Dominican Republic. The venue was used for the 1974 Central American and Caribbean Games and 2003 Pan American Games. The arena was recently renovated and used for volleyball competitions at the 2026 Central American and Caribbean Games.

2026 Women's NORCECA Volleyball Championship is located in the Dominican Republic	Santo Domingo
2026 Women's NORCECA Volleyball Championship is located in the Dominican Republic	Pabellón Ricardo Gioriver Arias
2026 Women's NORCECA Volleyball Championship is located in the Dominican Republic	Capacity: 3,500

== Referees ==
The following 8 referees were selected for the tournament.

- (Canada) Charles Andrew Robb
- (Costa Rica) Cinthya Hernandez Rojas
- (Cuba) Lourdes Perez Perez
- (Dominican Republic) Yuri R. Ramirez Ortiz
- (Mexico) Luis Gerardo Macias
- (Peru) Walter Hugo Vera Mechan
- (Portugal) Ricardo Ferreira
- (Puerto Rico) Hector Ortiz

== Format ==
The teams were drawn into two groups of four. The group winners advance directly to the semifinals. The second and third-placed teams from both groups advance to the quarterfinals. The bottom teams are dropped into the 7th place match.

== Preliminary round ==
Performance of teams at 2026 Women's NORCECA Volleyball Championship: Winner Runner-up Third place Fourth place / Fifth place Sixth place Seventh place Eighth place

The schedule was announced on August 17, 2026.

- All times are Atlantic Time (UTC-04:00).
- Match won 3–0 or 3–1: 3 match points for the winner, 0 match points for the loser
- Match won 3–2: 2 match points for the winner, 1 match point for the loser

=== Tiebreakers ===
1. Number of matches won
2. Match points
3. Sets ratio
4. Points ratio
5. If the tie continues as per the point ratio between two teams, the priority will be given to the team which won the match between them. When the tie in points ratio is between three or more teams, a new classification of these teams in the terms of points 1, 2, 3 and 4 will be made taking into consideration only the matches in which they were opposed to each other.

=== Pool A ===
Pos	Team	Pld	W	L	Pts	SW	SL	SR	SPW	SPL	SPR	Qualification
1	Canada	3	3	0	8	9	2	4.500	260	197	1.320	Semifinals
2	United States	3	2	1	7	8	3	2.667	260	187	1.390	Quarterfinals
3	Mexico	3	1	2	3	3	6	0.500	197	164	1.201	Quarterfinals
4	Trinidad and Tobago	3	0	3	0	0	9	0.000	56	225	0.249	5th-8th semifinals

Source: FIVB Live Center

Date	Time		Score		Set 1	Set 2	Set 3	Set 4	Set 5	Total	Attd	Report
Aug 21	13:00	United States	3–0	Trinidad and Tobago	25–6	25–11	25–4			75–21	50	P2 Report
Aug 21	15:30	Canada	3–0	Mexico	25–21	25–23	25–22			75–66	150	P2 Report
Aug 22	13:00	Canada	3–0	Trinidad and Tobago	25–10	25–6	25–5			75–21	50	P2 Report
Aug 22	18:00	United States	3–0	Mexico	25–19	25–20	25–17			75–56	1,000	P2 Report
Aug 23	15:30	Mexico	3–0	Trinidad and Tobago	25–4	25–10	25–0			75–14	200	P2 Report
Aug 23	18:00	United States	2–3	Canada	25–22	25–26	25–22	23–25	13–15	111–110	2,800	P2 Report

=== Pool B ===
Pos	Team	Pld	W	L	Pts	SW	SL	SR	SPW	SPL	SPR	Qualification
1	Dominican Republic (H)	3	3	0	9	9	1	9.000	246	182	1.352	Semifinals
2	Cuba	3	2	1	5	6	5	1.200	251	187	1.342	Quarterfinals
3	Puerto Rico	3	1	2	4	6	6	1.000	251	260	0.965	Quarterfinals
4	Costa Rica	3	0	3	0	0	9	0.000	106	225	0.471	5th-8th semifinals

Source: FIVB Live Center
(H) Host

Date	Time		Score		Set 1	Set 2	Set 3	Set 4	Set 5	Total	Attd	Report
Aug 21	18:00	Puerto Rico	2–3	Cuba	11–25	26–24	15–25	27–25	9–15	88–114	500	P2 Report
Aug 21	20:30	Dominican Republic	3–0	Costa Rica	26–11	25–11	25–10			76–32	1,500	P2 Report
Aug 22	15:30	Puerto Rico	3–0	Costa Rica	25–20	25–15	25–15			75–50	300	P2 Report
Aug 22	20:30	Dominican Republic	3–0	Cuba	25–23	25–17	25–22			75–62	2,500	P2 Report
Aug 23	13:00	Cuba	3–0	Costa Rica	25–7	25–11	25–6			75–24	50	P2 Report
Aug 23	20:30	Dominican Republic	3–1	Puerto Rico	21–25	25–19	25–21	25–23		96–88	3,300	P2 Report

== Final round ==
- All times are Atlantic Time (UTC-04:00).

Quarterfinals
August 24
United States	3
Puerto Rico	0
August 24
Cuba	3
Mexico	0

Semifinals
August 25
Dominican Republic	0
United States	3
August 25
Canada	3
Cuba	0

Final
August 26
Canada	3
United States	2
3rd place match
August 26
Cuba	3
Dominican Republic	0

5th-8th semifinals
August 25
Trinidad and Tobago	0
Puerto Rico	3
August 25
Costa Rica	0
Mexico	3

5th place match
August 26
Puerto Rico	3
Mexico	2
7th place match
August 26
Trinidad and Tobago	0
Costa Rica	3

=== Quarterfinals ===
Date	Time		Score		Set 1	Set 2	Set 3	Set 4	Set 5	Total	Attd	Report
Aug 24	17:30	United States	3–0	Puerto Rico	26–24	25–15	25–17			76–56	100	P2 Report
Aug 24	20:00	Cuba	3–0	Mexico	25–21	25–19	25–20			75–60	300	P2 Report

=== 5th-8th semifinals ===
Date	Time		Score		Set 1	Set 2	Set 3	Set 4	Set 5	Total	Attd	Report
Aug 25	13:00	Trinidad and Tobago	0–3	Puerto Rico	7–25	5–25	5–25			17–75	40	P2 Report
Aug 25	15:30	Costa Rica	0–3	Mexico	19–25	7–25	15–25			41–75	65	P2 Report

=== Semifinals ===
Date	Time		Score		Set 1	Set 2	Set 3	Set 4	Set 5	Total	Attd	Report
Aug 25	18:00	Canada	3–0	Cuba	25–19	25–13	25–17			75–49	1,300	P2 Report
Aug 25	20:30	Dominican Republic	0–3	United States	19–25	18–25	10–25			47–75	2,800	P2 Report

=== 7th place match ===
Date	Time		Score		Set 1	Set 2	Set 3	Set 4	Set 5	Total	Attd	Report
Aug 26	12:00	Trinidad and Tobago	0–3	Costa Rica	14–25	7–25	13–25			34–75	20	P2 Report

=== 5th place match ===
Date	Time		Score		Set 1	Set 2	Set 3	Set 4	Set 5	Total	Attd	Report
Aug 26	14:30	Puerto Rico	3–2	Mexico	25–16	23–25	23–25	25–17	15–11	111–94	150	P2 Report

=== 3rd place match ===
Date	Time		Score		Set 1	Set 2	Set 3	Set 4	Set 5	Total	Attd	Report
Aug 26	17:00	Cuba	3–0	Dominican Republic	26–24	25–17	25–18			76–59	1,700	P2 Report

=== Final ===
Date	Time		Score		Set 1	Set 2	Set 3	Set 4	Set 5	Total	Attd	Report
Aug 26	19:30	Canada	3–2	United States	25–23	25–23	20–25	18–25	15–10	103–106	500	P2 Report

== Final standings ==
Pos	Team	Pld	W	L	Pts	SW	SL	SR	SPW	SPL	SPR	Qualification
1st place, gold medalist(s)	Canada	5	5	0	13	15	4	3.750	438	352	1.244	Qualified for the 2027 World Cup as hosts and 2028 Summer Olympics qualifier
2nd place, silver medalist(s)	United States	6	4	2	14	16	6	2.667	517	393	1.316	Qualified for the 2027 World Cup as hosts and the 2028 Summer Olympics as hosts
3rd place, bronze medalist(s)	Cuba	5	3	2	8	9	8	1.125	451	381	1.184	Qualified for the 2027 World Cup and 2028 Summer Olympics qualifier
4	Dominican Republic (H)	5	3	2	9	9	7	1.286	352	333	1.057	Qualified for the 2027 World Cup and 2028 Summer Olympics qualifier
5	Puerto Rico	6	3	3	9	12	11	1.091	493	447	1.103	Qualified for the 2027 World Cup and 2028 Summer Olympics qualifier
6	Mexico	6	2	4	7	8	12	0.667	426	391	1.090	
7	Costa Rica	5	1	4	3	3	12	0.250	222	334	0.665	
8	Trinidad and Tobago	5	0	5	0	0	15	0.000	107	375	0.285	

Source: Bulletin 10
(H) Host

== Awards ==
2026 Women's NORCECA Volleyball champions

Canada
First title

The following awards were given at the conclusion of the tournament:

- Most valuable player
  (Canada) Kacey Jost
- Best spikers
  (United States) Simone Lee
  (Puerto Rico) Decelise Champion
- Best scorer
  (Puerto Rico) Decelise Champion
- Best middle blockers
  (Dominican Republic) Geraldine González
  (United States) Chiaka Ogbogu
- Best setter
  (Cuba) Gretell Moreno
- Best opposite
  (Cuba) Yalain De La Peña
- Best libero
  (Cuba) Yanisleidis Sánchez
- Best digger
  (Cuba) Yanisleidis Sánchez
- Best receiver
  (Canada) Abagayle Guezen
- Best server
  (Mexico) Paola Rivera

== Statistics ==
=== Top 5 Scorers ===
Rank	Name	Points
1	(Puerto Rico) Decelise Champion	89
2	(Cuba) Yalain De La Peña	76
3	(Mexico) Grecia Castro	70
4	(Mexico) Sofía Maldonado	63
5	(Cuba) Diaris Pérez (United States) Logan Eggleston	59

=== Notable statistics ===
- Most points in a set: 27–25 (Fourth set in Puerto Rico 2–3 Cuba, August 21)
- Fewest points by a team in a set: 25–0 (Third set in Mexico 2–3 Trinidad and Tobago, August 23)
- Longest game: 2 hr 40 min (Puerto Rico 2–3 Cuba, August 21)
- Shortest game: 56 min (United States 3–0 Trinidad and Tobago, August 21; Mexico 3–0 Trinidad and Tobago, August 23)
- Most points scored by a player in a game: 34 (Decelise Champion vs Mexico, August 26)
- Highest attended game: 3,300 (Dominican Republic 3–1 Puerto Rico, August 23)
- Lowest attended game: 20 (Trinidad and Tobago 0–3 Costa Rica, August 26)

== 2028 Summer Olympics qualifier ==
Unlike other continental championships, whose champions qualify directly for the Olympic Games, the NORCECA utilized a separate qualification process. The top four eligible teams—excluding the United States, which qualified automatically as the host nation—competed in a single-elimination tournament to determine the NORCECA representative for the 2028 Summer Olympics.

Semifinal
August 28
Canada	3
Puerto Rico	0
August 28
Cuba	1
Dominican Republic	3

Final
August 29
Canada	3
Dominican Republic	1
Third place match
August 29
Puerto Rico	0
Cuba	3

=== Semifinals ===
Date	Time		Score		Set 1	Set 2	Set 3	Set 4	Set 5	Total	Attd	Report
Aug 28	17:00	Canada	3–0	Puerto Rico	25–16	25–22	25–10			75–48	200	P2 Report
Aug 28	20:00	Cuba	1–3	Dominican Republic	25–20	19–25	17–25	15–25		76–95	1,500	P2 Report

=== 3rd place match ===
Date	Time		Score		Set 1	Set 2	Set 3	Set 4	Set 5	Total	Attd	Report
Aug 29	16:00	Puerto Rico	0–3	Cuba	22–25	18–25	21–25			61–75	350	P2 Report

=== Final ===
Date	Time		Score		Set 1	Set 2	Set 3	Set 4	Set 5	Total	Attd	Report
Aug 29	19:00	Canada	3–1	Dominican Republic	25–15	20–25	25–23	25–14		95–77	2,300	P2 Report

== See also ==
- 2026 AVC Women's Volleyball Continental Championship
- 2026 Women's African Nations Volleyball Championship
- 2026 Women's European Volleyball Championship
- 2026 Women's South American Volleyball Championship

Reference
Preview
Day 1
Day 2
Day 3
Day 4
Day 5
Day 6

Reference
Preview
Day 1
[ Day 2]
