= Yeisy Soto =

Colombian volleyball player (born 1996)

Personal information
- Nationality: Colombian
- Born: 7 April 1996 (age 30)
- Height: 186 cm (6 ft 1 in)
- Weight: 67 kg (148 lb)
- Spike: 290 cm (114 in)
- Block: 299 cm (118 in)

Volleyball information

Career
- Years: Team
- 2015: Liga Bolivarense

National team
- Years: Team
- 2015: Colombia
Honours
Women's volleyball
Representing Colombia
South American Championship
Silver medal – second place	2021 Barrancabermeja

Yeisy Soto (born 7 April 1996) is a Colombian volleyball player. She is part of the Colombia women's national volleyball team. On club level she played for Liga Bolivarense in 2015. She currently plays in German's national league with Rote Raben Vilsbiburg.
