= Liliya Konovalova =

Soviet volleyball player (1933–2015)

Personal information
- Full name: Liliya Nikolaevna Konovalova (Kalenik)
- Born: 20 February 1933; Novosibirsk, Russian SFSR, Soviet Union
- Died: 25 November 2015 (aged 82); Moscow, Russia
Honours
Women's volleyball
Representing Soviet Union
World Championship
Gold medal – first place	1956 France	Team
Gold medal – first place	1960 Brazil	Team
Silver medal – second place	1962 Soviet Union	Team
European Championship
Silver medal – second place	1955 Romania	Team

Liliya Nikolaevna Konovalova (Russian: Ли́лия Никола́евна Конова́лова; February 20, 1933 – November 25, 2015) was a Soviet volleyball player, who played in the USSR team from 1955 to 1962. She was twice world champion with the USSR team, six-time champion of the USSR with WVC Dynamo Moscow, and Honored Master of Sports of the USSR (1956).

Konovalova played for Dynamo Moscow from 1953 to 1962. During this time, her team was champion of the USSR (1953–1955, 1960, 1962), silver medalists of the union championships (1957 and 1958), winner of the USSR Cup (1953) and winner of the CEV Champions League in 1961.

From 1955 to 1962, the USSR national team were twice world champion (1956 and 1960), silver medalists of the world championship in 1962, and silver medalists of the 1955 Women's European Volleyball Championship.

After finishing her playing career, Konovalova taught Spanish at Moscow State Institute of International Relations.
