= Lyudmila Buldakova =

Soviet volleyball player (1938–2006)

Personal information
- Full name: Lyudmila Stepanovna Buldakova (Meshcheryakova)
- Born: 25 May 1938; Leningrad, RSFSR, Soviet Union
- Died: 7 November 2006 (aged 68); Moscow, Russia
- Height: 5 ft 7 in (1.70 m)
- Weight: 146 lb (66 kg)

Volleyball information
- Position: Setter, spiker

National team
1955-1972	Soviet Union
Honours
Women's volleyball
Representing Soviet Union
Olympic Games
Gold medal – first place	1968 Mexico City	Team
Gold medal – first place	1972 Munich	Team
Silver medal – second place	1964 Tokyo	Team
World Championship
Gold medal – first place	1956 France	Team
Gold medal – first place	1960 Brazil	Team
Gold medal – first place	1970 Bulgaria	Team
Silver medal – second place	1962 Soviet Union	Team
European Championship
Gold medal – first place	1958 Czechoslovakia	Team
Gold medal – first place	1967 Turkey	Team
Gold medal – first place	1971 Italy	Team
Silver medal – second place	1955 Romania	Team

Lyudmila Stepanovna Buldakova (25 May 1938 – 7 November 2006) was a Soviet and Russian volleyball player. She was a two-time Olympic gold medalist with the Soviet national team.

Buldakova had a long career in the Soviet national team, from 1955 through 1972, serving as the team captain in the last few years. At that time, the Soviet Union and Japan were the dominant nations in women's volleyball, and Buldakova and her team captured many titles. At the World Championships, she won the title in 1956, 1960 and 1970, while placing second in 1962 (the USSR boycotted the 1967 edition). The Soviet Union placed second behind Japan in the sport's Olympic debut in 1964, but then went on to win the gold in 1968 and 1972. Buldakova also became European Champion in 1958, 1967 and 1971, placing second in 1955, while missing the 1963 edition (which was won by the Soviet Union). In club play, Buldakova first played for Zalgiris Kaunas, before moving to Dynamo Moskva. With them, she won five USSR titles, and eight European Cups. After her retirement in 1975, she continued to be involved in volleyball as a children's coach.

The Lyudmila Buldakova Award, named after her, is the prize for the Russian Women's Volleyball Super League best player, created by the Russian Volleyball Federation after her death.

She became an inductee of the International Volleyball Hall of Fame in 2012.
