= Daniela Bulaich =

Argentinean volleyball player (born 1997)

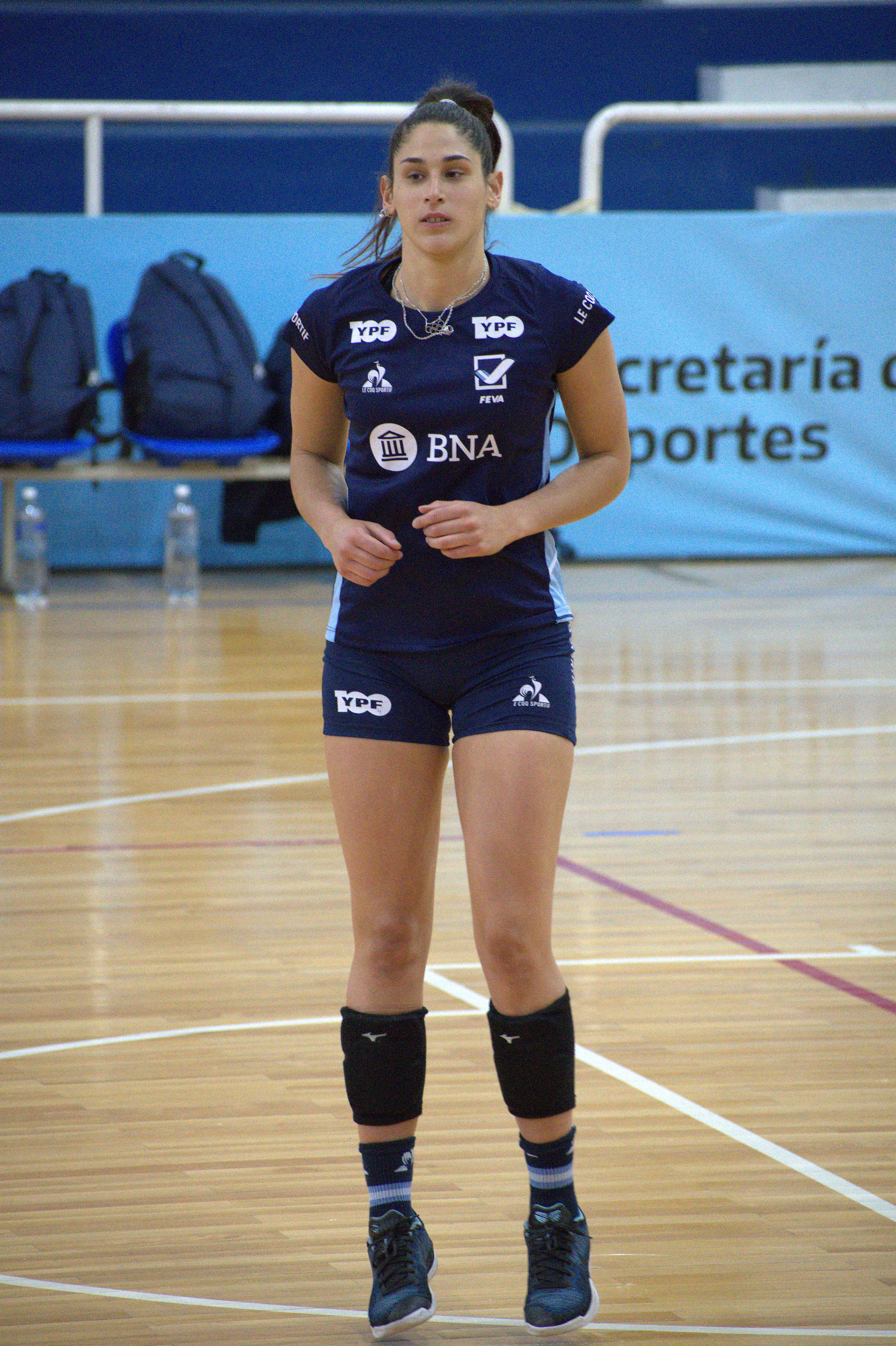
- Bulaich in 2022

Personal information
- Born: 5 September 1997 (age 29); Avellaneda, Argentina

National team
Argentina
Honours
Women's volleyball
Representing Argentina
South American Games
Gold medal – first place	2018 Cochabamba
South American Championship
Silver medal – second place	2023 Recife	Team
Bronze medal – third place	2021 Barrancabermeja

Daniela Bulaich Simian is an Argentine volleyball player. She is part of the Argentina women's national volleyball team. She competed at the 2020 Summer Olympics.

== Awards ==
=== Individuals ===
- 2021 South American Championship – "Best outside spiker"
