= 2021 Women's South American Volleyball Championship =

Tournament details
- Host country: Colombia
- Dates: 15–19 September
- Teams: 5
- Venue: 1 (in Barrancabermeja host cities)

Final positions
- Champions: Brazil (22nd title)
- Runners-up: Colombia
- Third place: Argentina
- Fourth place: Peru

Tournament awards
- MVP: (Brazil) Gabriela Guimarães
- Best Setter: (Colombia) Maria Alejandra Marín
- Best OH: (Colombia) Amanda Coneo (Argentina) Daniela Bulaich
- Best MB: (Colombia) Yeisy Soto (Brazil) Ana Carolina da Silva
- Best OPP: (Brazil) Ana Cristina de Souza
- Best Libero: (Argentina) Tatiana Rizzo

The 2021 Women's South American Volleyball Championship was the 34th edition of the Women's South American Volleyball Championship held in Barrancabermeja, Colombia and organised by South America's governing volleyball body, the Confederación Sudamericana de Voleibol (CSV). The champion and first runner-ups will qualify for the 2022 FIVB Volleyball Women's World Championship.

== Competing nations ==
The following national teams participated:

- Argentina
- Brazil
- Chile
- Colombia (Hosts)
- Peru

== Venues ==
All Matches
Barrancabermeja, Colombia
Coliseo Luis Fernando Castellanos
Capacity: 7,000

== Pool standing procedure ==
1. Number of matches won
2. Match points
3. Sets ratio
4. Points ratio
5. If the tie continues as per the point ratio between two teams, the priority will be given to the team which won the last match between them. When the tie in points ratio is between three or more teams, a new classification of these teams in the terms of points 1, 2 and 3 will be made taking into consideration only the matches in which they were opposed to each other.

Match won 3–0 or 3–1: 3 match points for the winner, 0 match points for the loser
Match won 3–2: 2 match points for the winner, 1 match point for the loser

== Round robin ==
- All times are Colombia Time (UTC−05:00).

Pos	Team	Pld	W	L	Pts	SW	SL	SR	SPW	SPL	SPR
1	Brazil	4	3	1	9	10	4	2.500	339	269	1.260
2	Colombia (H)	4	3	1	9	10	5	2.000	354	323	1.096
3	Argentina	4	2	2	6	8	6	1.333	311	293	1.061
4	Peru	4	2	2	6	6	7	0.857	284	295	0.963
5	Chile	4	0	4	0	0	12	0.000	192	300	0.640

(H) Host nation

Date	Time		Score		Set 1	Set 2	Set 3	Set 4	Set 5	Total	Report
15 Sep	17:30	Peru	0–3	Brazil	17–25	23–25	18–25			58–75	Report
15 Sep	20:00	Chile	0–3	Colombia	20–25	13–25	12–25			45–75	Report
16 Sep	17:30	Brazil	3–1	Argentina	23–25	25–13	25–14	25–16		98–68	Report
16 Sep	20:00	Colombia	1–3	Peru	22–25	25–19	21–25	20–25		88–94	Report
17 Sep	17:30	Brazil	3–0	Chile	25–11	25–19	25–14			75–44	Report
17 Sep	20:00	Peru	0–3	Argentina	18–25	17–25	22–25			57–75	Report
18 Sep	17:00	Chile	0–3	Peru	20–25	16–25	21–25			57–75	Report
18 Sep	20:00	Colombia	3–1	Argentina	25–20	15–25	27–25	25–23		92–93	Report
19 Sep	17:00	Argentina	3–0	Chile	25–19	25–5	25–22			75–46	Report
19 Sep	20:00	Colombia	3–1	Brazil	25–19	25–23	24–26	25–23		99–91	Report

== Final standing ==
Rank	Team
1st place, gold medalist(s)	Brazil
2nd place, silver medalist(s)	Colombia
3rd place, bronze medalist(s)	Argentina
4	Peru
5	Chile

Qualified for the 2022 World Championship

2021 Women's South American Champions

Brazil
22nd title

== Awards ==
- Most valuable player
  (Brazil) Gabriela Guimarães
- Best setter
  (Colombia) Maria Alejandra Marín
- Best outside spikers
  (Colombia) Amanda Coneo
  (Argentina) Daniela Bulaich
- Best middle blockers
  (Colombia) Yeisy Soto
  (Brazil) Ana Carolina da Silva
- Best opposite spiker
  (Brazil) Ana Cristina de Souza
- Best libero
  (Argentina) Tatiana Rizzo

== See also ==
- South American Men's Volleyball Championship
- Women's U22 South American Volleyball Championship
- Women's Junior South American Volleyball Championship
- Girls' Youth South American Volleyball Championship
- Girls' U16 South American Volleyball Championship
- Volleyball at the Pan American Games
- Men's Pan-American Volleyball Cup
- Women's Pan-American Volleyball Cup
