= FIVB Women's Volleyball World Cup =

Volleyball tournament

- Upcoming season or competition: 2027 FIVB Women's Volleyball World Cup
- Formerly: FIVB Women's Volleyball World Championship (1952–2025)
- Sport: Volleyball
- Founded: 1952; 74 years ago
- First season: 1952
- CEO: Ary Graça
- No. of teams: 32 (Finals)
- Continent: World (FIVB)
- Most recent champions: Italy (2nd title)
- Most titles: Soviet Union (5 titles)
- Streaming partner: Volleyball TV (since 2018)
- Website: en.volleyballworld.com/volleyball/competitions/women-world-championship/

The FIVB Women's Volleyball World Cup, formerly known as the FIVB Women's Volleyball World Championship, is an international volleyball competition contested by the senior women's national teams of the members of Fédération Internationale de Volleyball (FIVB), the sport's global governing body. The initial gap between championships was variable, but since 1970 they have been awarded every four years. Starting in 2025, the tournament is held biennially.

The current champions are Italy, which won their second title at the 2025 tournament in Thailand.

The current format of the competition involves a qualification phase, which currently takes place over the preceding three years, to determine which teams qualify for the tournament phase, which is often called the World Championship Finals. 32 teams, including the automatically qualifying host nation(s), compete in the tournament phase for the title at venues within the host nation(s) over a period of about a month.

The 20 World Championship tournaments have been won by eight different national teams. Soviet Union have won five times. The other World Championship winners are Japan and Cuba, with three titles each; China, Italy, Russia and Serbia, with two titles each; and the United States, with one title.

== History ==
The history of the World Championship goes back to the beginnings of volleyball as a professional, high level sport. One of the first concrete measures taken by the FIVB after its foundation in 1947 was the establishment of an international competition involving teams from more than one continent. In 1949, the first edition of the Men's World Championship was played in Prague, Czechoslovakia. At that point, the tournament was still restricted to Europe.

Three years later, a women's version was introduced; the events were synchronized and expanded to include nations from Asia, and began to be held in 4-year cycles. By the following edition, there were also teams from South, Central and North America.

Since volleyball was to be added to the Olympic Program in 1964, the 4-cycles were advanced in 2 years after the fourth edition (1960), so that the World Championship may alternate with the Summer Olympics. As of 1970, teams from Africa also took part in the competition, and the original goal of having members from all five continental confederations in the games was achieved.

The number of teams involved in the games has changed significantly over the years. Following volleyball's increase in popularity, they raised steadily to over 20 in the 1970s and part of the 1980s, were then cut short to 16 in the 1990s, and finally set up in 24 after 2002. Today, the World Championship is the most comprehensive of all events organized by the FIVB, and arguably the second most important, surpassed in prestige only by the Olympic Games.

Until 1974, the host nation of the tournament organized both the men's and the women's events, with the single exception of the 1966/1967 games, which took place in different years. Since 1978, this practice has been only occasionally observed, for instance, in 1998 and in the 2006 edition, which was held, as the former was, in Japan.

On 15 October 2022, FIVB announced the expansion of the World Championships and the changes to their common competition formula. A total of 32 teams are to compete for future editions of the tournament.

On 22 June 2023, Volleyball Calendar 2025–2028 approved by FIVB showed that World Championships are to be played biannually in odd years. The first reformed World Championships will be held in 2025 with 32 teams in new formula.

On 5 March 2026, the tournament was officially renamed the FIVB Volleyball World Cup starting with the 2027 edition. According to the FIVB, this change was intended to align volleyball with the terminology of other major global sporting events and to enhance the tournament's brand recognition.

=== Winners ===
If the titles of the Women's World Championship are evenly distributed between European and non-Europeans national teams, the situation is quite different when nations are taken into account. Historically, four national teams dominated at the World Championships — Russia (formerly participated as Soviet Union), Japan, China and Cuba (except for Italy's single — and for many, unexpected — victory in 2002). However, at last tournaments, two national teams became triumphants for the first time — United States in 2014 and Serbia in 2018.

The Soviets made a most impressive start by winning the first three editions of the tournament: 1952, 1956, 1960. They were halfway to making it four, since the following edition was to be played in Moscow. Former runners-up Japan, nevertheless, was the champions in 1962 and interrupted the winning streak, repeating the performance in 1967, when the Soviet Union national team did not participate.

The teams faced each other again in 1970, and this time the Soviet Union beat their opponents to collect the gold. In the following edition, Japan took revenge and defeated the Soviet Union in straight sets. Then something extraordinary happened: the world watched astonished as a young Cuban squad left behind the two longtime rivals and secured the first important volleyball title for a continent other than Europe or Asia.

The early 1980s saw the rise of a new Asian force: led by superstar Lang Ping, China stamped their mark on the World Championship's history by winning two editions in a row (1982 and 1986). They also made it to the finals in 1990, but were overpowered by the Soviet Union in their last participation at the competition.

Cuba's 1978 title finally fructified in an aggressive style of play that virtually dominated the 1990s. Led by powerplayers Regla Torres, Mireya Luis and Regla Bell, the Caribbeans won the 1994 and 1998 editions of the World Championship, beating newbies as well as tradition rivals such as Russia and China.

In spite of being appointed as favourites in 2002, China lost at the semifinals to a rising Italy, which would eventually win the final against United States

In 2006, favourites Brazil couldn't stop Russia and lost the gold medal match in a shocking final tie-breaker, while Serbia won its first medal in the competition by beating Italy 3–0 in a bronze medal match. In 2010, Russia once again defeated Brazil in a 5th-set tie-breaker.

In 2014, the United States made it to the finals after an astonishing straight-set win against the 2012 Olympic champion and 2006 and 2010 runner-up Brazil. China, on the other hand, reached the championship after winning over hosts Italy in a four-set fashion. The finals saw two former World champions – Lang Ping and Karch Kiraly – at the helm of the champion squads. United States' momentum carried them to a 3–1 victory over the young Chinese squad, earning the first ever World title for the USA women's team after finishing as bridesmaids in several editions of the World Championship, World Cup and the Olympic Games.

In 2018, Serbia achieved historical victory after defeating Italy in a 5th-set tie-breaker. It became greatest international success for the short history of this national team. In 2022, Serbia retained their title after winning all 12 matches at the tournament including a 3–0 victory over Brazil in the final match.

In 2025, Italy won their second World title after victory against Turkey in the final.

As of 2025, 20 editions of the women's Volleyball World Championship have been played: 11 went to European teams, five to Asian teams (three times to Japan and two times to China), and four to American teams (three times to Cuba and once to United States).

Total times teams hosted by confederation Confederations and years italicized & in bold have an upcoming competition.
Confederation	Total	(Hosts) Years
AVC (Asia)	8	(Japan) 1967, (China) 1990, (Japan) 1998, (Japan) 2006, (Japan) 2010, (Japan) 2018, (Thailand) 2025, (Philippines) **2029**
CAVB (Africa)	0	
CEV (Europe)	9	(Soviet Union) 1952, (France) 1956, (Soviet Union) 1962, (Bulgaria) 1970, (Soviet Union) 1978, (Czechoslovakia) 1986, (Germany) 2002, (Italy) 2014, (Netherlands) (Poland) 2022
CSV (South America)	3	(Brazil) 1960, (Peru) 1982, (Brazil) 1994
NORCECA (North America)	2	(Mexico) 1974, (United States) (Canada) **2027**

== Competition formula ==
=== Qualification ===
Previous qualification

Confederation	Slots 2022
CAVB (Africa)	2
AVC (Asia and Oceania)	2
CEV (Europe)	2
NORCECA (North America)	2
CSV (South America)	2
World ranked non-qualified teams	12
Total	24 (22+H+C)

New qualification

Confederation	Slots 2025–
CAVB (Africa)	3
AVC (Asia and Oceania)	3
CEV (Europe)	3
NORCECA (North America)	3
CSV (South America)	3
World ranked non-qualified teams	15
Total	32 (30+H+C)

=== Final tournament ===
The competition formula of the FIVB World Championship has been constantly changed to fit the different number of teams that participate in each edition. The following rules usually apply:

- Twenty-four teams participate in each event.
- Qualification procedures for the World Championship are long and strenuous, lasting over two years.
- Host nations are always pre-qualified.
- The number of spots available per confederation is determined by the FIVB: Europe has usually the highest, and Africa or South America the lowest.
- To participate in the event, a team must survive a number of qualification tournaments depending on its position in the FIVB World Rankings. Low-ranked teams may have to engage in up to three tournaments to be granted a berth; high-ranked teams typically play only one.
- The competition is divided in at least two phases: a preliminary round and a final round. Depending on the number of participating teams, one or more intermediary rounds may also be required.
- In the preliminary round, teams are organized in pools. Each team plays one match against all other teams in its pool.
- When all the matches of the preliminary round have been played, the top n teams in each pool qualify for the following round(s), and the remaining ones leave the competition. The value of n depends on the number of participating teams and the format that will be employed in the finals.
- The FIVB has tried various different formats for the final round(s). For some years now (2004), there seems to be a consensus that at least semifinals and finals must be played according to the Olympic format.
- Quarterfinals may consist of groups of teams playing against each other, or of direct confrontation; in the latter case additional intermediary rounds might be required to reduce the number of surviving teams to eight.
- The tournament now implements a line-up of fourteen players, and four reserve players in case of injuries.

==== New formula ====
A totally new competition formula was announced by FIVB in October 2022. A total of 32 teams will compete in the World Championship. The teams will be divided into 8 groups of 4 teams for the round-robin phase with 2 best teams per group moving into the direct knockout phase: round of 16, quarterfinals, semi-finals and final.

== Results summary ==
#	Year	Host	Final			3rd place match			Teams
#	Year	Host	Champions	Score	Runners-up	3rd place	Score	4th place	Teams
1	1952; Details	Soviet Union	Soviet Union	Round-robin (3–0)	Poland	Czechoslovakia	Round-robin (3–2)	Bulgaria	8
2	1956; Details	France	Soviet Union	Round-robin (3–2)	Romania	Poland	Round-robin (3–2)	Czechoslovakia	17
3	1960; Details	Brazil	Soviet Union	Round-robin (3–1)	Japan	Czechoslovakia	Round-robin (3–0)	Poland	10
4	1962; Details	Soviet Union	Japan	Round-robin (3–1)	Soviet Union	Poland	Round-robin (3–0)	Romania	14
5	1967; Details	Japan	Japan	Round-robin (3–0)	United States	South Korea	Round-robin (3–0)	Peru	4
6	1970; Details	Bulgaria	Soviet Union	Round-robin (3–1)	Japan	North Korea	Round-robin (3–2)	Hungary	16
7	1974; Details	Mexico	Japan	Round-robin (3–0)	Soviet Union	South Korea	Round-robin (3–1)	East Germany	23
8	1978; Details	Soviet Union	Cuba	3–0	Japan	Soviet Union	3–1	South Korea	23
9	1982; Details	Peru	China	3–0	Peru	United States	3–1	Japan	23
10	1986; Details	Czechoslovakia	China	3–1	Cuba	Peru	3–1	East Germany	16
11	1990; Details	China	Soviet Union	3–1	China	United States	3–1	Cuba	16
12	1994; Details	Brazil	Cuba	3–0	Brazil	Russia	3–1	South Korea	16
13	1998; Details	Japan	Cuba	3–0	China	Russia	3–1	Brazil	16
14	2002; Details	Germany	Italy	3–2	United States	Russia	3–1	China	24
15	2006; Details	Japan	Russia	3–2	Brazil	Serbia and Montenegro	3–0	Italy	24
16	2010; Details	Japan	Russia	3–2	Brazil	Japan	3–2	United States	24
17	2014; Details	Italy	United States	3–1	China	Brazil	3–2	Italy	24
18	2018; Details	Japan	Serbia	3–2	Italy	China	3–0	Netherlands	24
19	2022; Details	Netherlands / Poland	Serbia	3–0	Brazil	Italy	3–0	United States	24
20	2025; Details	Thailand	Italy	3–2	Turkey	Brazil	3–2	Japan	32
21	2027; Details	United States / Canada		–			–		32
22	2029; Details	Philippines		–			–		32

== Medals summary ==
Rank	Nation	Gold	Silver	Bronze	Total
1	Soviet Union	5	2	1	8
2	Japan	3	3	1	7
3	Cuba	3	1	0	4
4	China	2	3	1	6
5	Italy	2	1	1	4
6	Russia	2	0	3	5
7	Serbia	2	0	0	2
8	United States	1	2	2	5
9	Brazil	0	4	2	6
10	Poland	0	1	2	3
11	Peru	0	1	1	2
12	Romania	0	1	0	1
12	Turkey	0	1	0	1
14	Czechoslovakia	0	0	2	2
14	South Korea	0	0	2	2
16	North Korea	0	0	1	1
16	Serbia and Montenegro	0	0	1	1
Totals (17 entries)		20	20	20	60

== Hosts ==
List of hosts by number of championships hosted.

Times hosted	Nations	Year(s)
5	Japan	1967, 1998, 2006, 2010, 2018
3	Soviet Union	1952, 1962, 1978
2	Brazil	1960, 1994
1	Bulgaria	1970
1	Canada	2027*
1	China	1990
1	Czechoslovakia	1986
1	France	1956
1	Germany	2002
1	Italy	2014
1	Mexico	1974
1	Netherlands	2022*
1	Peru	1982
1	Philippines	2029
1	Poland	2022*
1	Thailand	2025
1	United States	2027*

* = co-hosts.

== MVP by edition ==
- 1952–78 – Not awarded
- 1982 – Lang Ping (CHN)
- 1986 – Yang Xilan (CHN)
- 1990 – Irina Parkhomchuk (URS)
- 1994 – Regla Torres (CUB)
- 1998 – Regla Torres (CUB)
- 2002 – Elisa Togut (ITA)
- 2006 – Yoshie Takeshita (JPN)
- 2010 – Yekaterina Gamova (RUS)
- 2014 – Kimberly Hill (USA)
- 2018 – Tijana Bošković (SRB)
- 2022 – Tijana Bošković (SRB)
- 2025 – Alessia Orro (ITA)

== Most successful players ==
Boldface denotes active volleyball players and highest medal count among all players (including these who not included in these tables) per type.

=== Multiple gold medalists ===
Rank	Player	Country	From	To	Gold	Silver	Bronze	Total
1	Lyudmila Buldakova (Meshcheryakova)	Soviet Union	1956	1970	**3**	1	–	**4 ***
2	Aleksandra Chudina	Soviet Union	1952	1960	**3**	–	–	3
2	Militiya Yeremeyeva (Kononova)	Soviet Union	1952	1960	**3**	–	–	3
4	Liliya Konovalova (Kalenik)	Soviet Union	1956	1962	2	1	–	3
4	Mireya Luis	Cuba	1986	1998	2	1	–	3
4	Katsumi Matsumura	Japan	1962	1970	2	1	–	3
4	Lyudmila Mikhaylovskaya	Soviet Union	1960	1970	2	1	–	3
4	Antonina Ryzhova (Moiseyeva)	Soviet Union	1956	1962	2	1	–	3
4	Lidiya Strelnikova	Soviet Union	1956	1962	2	1	–	3
10	Yekaterina Gamova	Russia	2002	2010	2	–	1	3
10	Lyubov Sokolova (Shashkova)	Russia	1998	2010	2	–	1	3

* Till now, Lyudmila Buldakova (Meshcheryakova) remains the only female volleyball player to have won four World Championship medals

== See also ==
- Volleyball at the Summer Olympics
- FIVB Volleyball World Grand Champions Cup
- FIVB Volleyball World Grand Prix
- FIVB Women's Volleyball Nations League
- FIVB Volleyball Women's U23 World Championship
- FIVB Volleyball Women's U21 World Championship
- FIVB Volleyball Girls' U19 World Championship
- List of indoor volleyball world medalists
