= 1956 FIVB Women's Volleyball World Championship =

1956 FIVB Women's World Championship
Championnat du monde féminin France 1956
- Official poster

Tournament details
- Host country: France
- City: Paris
- Dates: 30 August – 12 September
- Teams: 17
- Venues: 3 (in 1 host city)

Final positions
- Champions: Soviet Union (2nd title)
- Runners-up: Romania
- Third place: Poland
- Fourth place: Czechoslovakia

The 1956 FIVB Women's World Championship was the second edition of the tournament, contested by the senior women's national teams of the members of the Fédération Internationale de Volleyball (FIVB), the sport's global governing body. It was held from 30 August to 12 September 1956 in France, with all matches played at three venues in Paris. A record seventeen teams took part — more than double the eight that had contested the inaugural edition in 1952 — twelve of them appearing at a Women's World Championship for the first time. The women's tournament was staged concurrently with the men's World Championship in the same city, making Paris the centre of world volleyball for a fortnight.

The Soviet Union successfully defended the title they had won on home soil four years earlier, going through the tournament undefeated to claim their second world crown. The championship was effectively settled on 6 September at the Stade Pierre de Coubertin, where the Soviets recovered from two sets down to defeat Romania 3–2 in the decisive match of the final round. Romania, for whom it was the only defeat of the tournament, took the silver medal, while Poland finished third ahead of Czechoslovakia.

The Paris championship was the first edition held outside the Soviet Union and the first to feature teams from beyond Europe on any significant scale, with entries from Asia and the Americas; the FIVB later described it as "the first truly globe-spanning World Championship". Staged at a time when volleyball had yet to appear at the Olympic Games, the size and success of the 1956 tournament formed part of the sport's case for Olympic inclusion, which was approved by the International Olympic Committee the following year for the 1964 Tokyo Games.

== Background ==
The FIVB had been founded in Paris in 1947, and the first Women's World Championship was organised five years later, in August 1952 in Moscow. Eight teams — seven from Europe and India — contested that inaugural event in a single round-robin, and the host Soviet Union won all seven of its matches to take the title ahead of Poland.

For the second edition the tournament returned to the federation's birthplace. Paris organised the women's championship alongside the third men's World Championship, in which 24 men's teams from four continents competed and which was won by Czechoslovakia. The women's field grew from eight to seventeen teams: alongside the established Eastern European powers — the Soviet Union, Poland, Romania, Bulgaria and Czechoslovakia — and hosts France, the entry list included China, North Korea and Israel from Asia, Brazil and the United States from the Americas, and, reflecting the political reality of the divided continent, separate teams from East and West Germany.

The Soviet squad arrived as clear favourites. It was captained by Aleksandra Chudina, one of the outstanding all-round athletes of her era: a three-time Olympic medallist in athletics at the 1952 Summer Olympics (silver in the long jump and javelin throw, bronze in the high jump) and a former world record holder in the high jump, she was regarded as perhaps the best volleyball player in the Soviet team. The side was coached by Alexey Yakushev.

== Teams ==
Seventeen national teams entered the tournament. Twelve of them were making their Women's World Championship debuts; the only nations with previous experience of the event were Bulgaria, Poland, Romania, hosts France and the reigning champions, the Soviet Union.

- Austria (debut)
- Belgium (debut)
- Brazil (debut)
- Bulgaria
- China (debut)
- Czechoslovakia (debut)
- East Germany (debut)
- France (host)
- Israel (debut)
- Luxembourg (debut)
- Netherlands (debut)
- North Korea (debut)
- Poland
- Romania
- Soviet Union (reigning champion)
- United States (debut)
- West Germany (debut)

== Squads ==
Source:

== Venues ==
All matches were played in Paris at three indoor arenas. The largest was the Palais des Sports (capacity 4,600), while the showpiece matches of the final round — including the championship-deciding meeting between the Soviet Union and Romania — were staged at the 4,016-seat Stade Pierre de Coubertin. The smallest of the three grounds was the Salle Japy (capacity 1,500).

Paris (France)	Paris		
Paris (France)	Stade Pierre de Coubertin	Salle Japy	Palais des Sports
Paris (France)	Capacity: 4,016	Capacity: 1,500	Capacity: 4,600

== Format ==
The tournament was played in two different stages (first and final rounds). In the First round, the 17 participants were divided in five groups (two groups of four teams and three groups of three teams). A single round-robin format was played within each group to determine the teams group position, all teams progressed to the next round.

In the Final round, two groups were created (1st-10th and 11th-17th), teams were allocated to a group according to their First round group position (best two teams of each group going to 1st-10th and the remaining teams to 11th-17th). A single round-robin format was played within each group with matches already played between teams in the First round also counted in this round.

Under this format every team in the top group played nine matches in eleven days, and eighty matches were contested across the tournament as a whole.

== Pools composition ==
Pool A	Pool B	Pool C	Pool D	Pool E
Israel	Austria	Belgium	Bulgaria	Brazil
Luxembourg	China	Czechoslovakia	East Germany	North Korea
Soviet Union	Poland	Netherlands	France	Romania
United States	West Germany			

== Results ==
=== First round ===
The first round produced few surprises. In Pool A the Soviet Union won all three of its matches in straight sets, conceding just 25 points in total, with the United States — also unbeaten against the group's weaker sides — taking second place. Pool B provided the most competitive match of the opening stage, Poland beating China 3–1 after the first two sets were shared; both teams advanced. Czechoslovakia and the Netherlands came through Pool C without dropping a set against Belgium and each other until their own meeting, which the Czechoslovaks won 3–0, while in Pool D Bulgaria topped the group ahead of East Germany and hosts France were consigned to the placement round. In Pool E, Romania defeated first North Korea and had earlier beaten Brazil, who recovered from an opening 3–1 defeat by the Koreans to claim third place in the group.

==== Pool A ====
Pos	Team	Pld	W	L	Pts	SW	SL	SR	SPW	SPL	SPR	Qualification
1	Soviet Union	3	3	0	6	9	0	MAX	135	25	5.400	Final places
2	United States	3	2	1	5	6	3	2.000	107	54	1.981	Final places
3	Israel	3	1	2	4	3	6	0.500	56	108	0.519	11th–17th places
4	Luxembourg	3	0	3	3	0	9	0.000	24	135	0.178	11th–17th places

Date		Score		Set 1	Set 2	Set 3	Set 4	Set 5	Total
30 Aug	Soviet Union	3–0	Luxembourg	15–1	15–2	15–1			45–4
30 Aug	United States	3–0	Israel	15–1	15–4	15–2			45–7
31 Aug	Israel	3–0	Luxembourg	15–7	15–5	15–6			45–18
31 Aug	Soviet Union	3–0	United States	15–7	15–4	15–6			45–17
1 Sep	Soviet Union	3–0	Israel	15–2	15–2	15–0			45–4
1 Sep	United States	3–0	Luxembourg	15–0	15–1	15–1			45–2

==== Pool B ====
Pos	Team	Pld	W	L	Pts	SW	SL	SR	SPW	SPL	SPR	Qualification
1	Poland	3	3	0	6	9	1	9.000	151	53	2.849	Final places
2	China	3	2	1	5	7	3	2.333	133	72	1.847	Final places
3	Austria	3	1	2	4	3	6	0.500	59	107	0.551	11th–17th places
4	West Germany	3	0	3	3	0	9	0.000	24	135	0.178	11th–17th places

Date		Score		Set 1	Set 2	Set 3	Set 4	Set 5	Total
30 Aug	Poland	3–0	West Germany	15–0	15–0	15–1			45–1
30 Aug	China	3–0	Austria	15–1	15–2	15–2			45–5
31 Aug	Austria	3–0	West Germany	15–10	15–7	15–0			45–17
31 Aug	Poland	3–1	China	17–15	14–16	15–6	15–6		61–43
1 Sep	China	3–0	West Germany	15–1	15–3	15–2			45–6
1 Sep	Poland	3–0	Austria	15–5	15–3	15–1			45–9

==== Pool C ====
Pos	Team	Pld	W	L	Pts	SW	SL	SR	SPW	SPL	SPR	Qualification
1	Czechoslovakia	2	2	0	4	6	0	MAX	90	13	6.923	Final places
2	Netherlands	2	1	1	3	3	3	1.000	52	67	0.776	Final places
3	Belgium	2	0	2	2	0	6	0.000	28	90	0.311	11th–17th places

Date		Score		Set 1	Set 2	Set 3	Set 4	Set 5	Total
30 Aug	Czechoslovakia	3–0	Belgium	15–1	15–1	15–4			45–6
31 Aug	Netherlands	3–0	Belgium	15–10	15–7	15–5			45–22
1 Sep	Czechoslovakia	3–0	Netherlands	15–3	15–4	15–0			45–7

==== Pool D ====
Pos	Team	Pld	W	L	Pts	SW	SL	SR	SPW	SPL	SPR	Qualification
1	Bulgaria	2	2	0	4	6	1	6.000	104	59	1.763	Final places
2	East Germany	2	1	1	3	3	3	1.000	66	81	0.815	Final places
3	France	2	0	2	2	1	6	0.167	74	104	0.712	11th–17th places

Date		Score		Set 1	Set 2	Set 3	Set 4	Set 5	Total
30 Aug	East Germany	3–0	France	15–13	15–11	15–12			45–36
31 Aug	Bulgaria	3–1	France	15–3	15–8	14–16	15–11		59–38
1 Sep	Bulgaria	3–0	East Germany	15–7	15–7	15–7			45–21

==== Pool E ====
Pos	Team	Pld	W	L	Pts	SW	SL	SR	SPW	SPL	SPR	Qualification
1	Romania	2	2	0	4	6	0	MAX	92	54	1.704	Final places
2	North Korea	2	1	1	3	3	4	0.750	88	78	1.128	Final places
3	Brazil	2	0	2	2	1	6	0.167	55	103	0.534	11th–17th places

Date		Score		Set 1	Set 2	Set 3	Set 4	Set 5	Total
30 Aug	North Korea	3–1	Brazil	15–6	11–15	15–3	15–9		56–33
31 Aug	Romania	3–0	Brazil	17–15	15–4	15–3			47–22
1 Sep	Romania	3–0	North Korea	15–11	15–11	15–10			45–32

=== Final round ===
The results and the points of the matches between the same teams that were already played during the first round are taken into account for the final round.

In the group for the 11th–17th places, Brazil — beaten twice in the first round — found their level and won all six of their placement matches, dropping only a single set, to the hosts, en route to eleventh place. France won their other five matches to finish twelfth, Belgium took thirteenth place and Luxembourg ended the tournament winless in seventeenth.

The ten-team group for the final places quickly developed into a contest between the Soviet Union and Romania. The decisive encounter came on 6 September: Romania took the first two sets 15–12 and 15–11 and stood one set from a victory that would have put them in control of the title race, but the defending champions responded by taking the next three sets 15–6, 15–12 and 15–8 to complete a 3–2 comeback. It proved to be the only defeat Romania suffered in Paris; they recovered to win five-set matches against Bulgaria, Poland and Czechoslovakia on three consecutive days (8–10 September) and closed the tournament with an 8–1 record and the silver medal, their best result at a World Championship.

The bronze medal was decided by fine margins. Poland and Czechoslovakia both finished with records of six wins and three defeats, and Poland's 3–2 victory in their head-to-head meeting on 3 September — a match in which the two sides scored exactly 63 points each, Poland prevailing 16–14 in the fifth set — proved decisive. Bulgaria took fifth place, ahead of debutants China in sixth and North Korea in seventh; China were the only side besides Romania to beat the United States in five sets, and the sixth-place finish began a long association between the Chinese team and the heights of the world game. East Germany placed eighth, the United States ninth and the Netherlands, winless in nine final-round matches, tenth. The Soviet Union completed their programme on 12 September with a 3–0 win over Czechoslovakia to seal a perfect record of nine victories in the final round; only Romania and Poland (in a 3–1 defeat on 11 September) managed to take a set from the champions all tournament.

==== 11th–17th places ====
Pos	Team	Pld	W	L	Pts	SW	SL	SR	SPW	SPL	SPR
11	Brazil	6	6	0	12	18	1	18.000	286	100	2.860
12	France	6	5	1	11	16	3	5.333	275	129	2.132
13	Belgium	6	4	2	10	12	7	1.714	233	206	1.131
14	Israel	6	3	3	9	10	10	1.000	215	216	0.995
15	Austria	6	2	4	8	7	12	0.583	183	227	0.806
16	West Germany	6	1	5	7	3	16	0.188	132	274	0.482
17	Luxembourg	6	0	6	6	1	18	0.056	108	280	0.386

Date		Score		Set 1	Set 2	Set 3	Set 4	Set 5	Total
2 Sep	Belgium	3–1	Israel	15–9	17–15	5–15	15–11		52–50
2 Sep	France	3–0	Luxembourg	15–1	15–0	15–1			45–2
2 Sep	Brazil	3–0	West Germany	15–1	15–0	15–4			45–5
3 Sep	France	3–0	Austria	15–6	15–6	15–4			45–16
3 Sep	Belgium	3–0	West Germany	15–10	15–2	15–8			45–20
3 Sep	Brazil	3–0	Luxembourg	15–1	15–1	15–0			45–2
5 Sep	Israel	3–0	West Germany	15–11	15–7	15–3			45–21
5 Sep	Belgium	3–0	Luxembourg	15–0	15–8	15–5			45–13
5 Sep	Brazil	3–0	Austria	15–0	15–6	15–3			45–9
6 Sep	Belgium	3–0	Austria	15–6	15–13	16–14			46–33
6 Sep	Brazil	3–1	France	15–13	17–15	14–16	15–6		61–50
8 Sep	France	3–0	Belgium	15–7	15–8	15–6			45–21
8 Sep	West Germany	3–1	Luxembourg	15–5	15–13	7–15	18–16		55–49
8 Sep	Israel	3–1	Austria	5–15	15–3	15–8	15–9		50–35
9 Sep	France	3–0	Israel	15–2	15–11	15–2			45–15
9 Sep	Brazil	3–0	Belgium	15–5	15–10	15–9			45–24
10 Sep	Austria	3–0	Luxembourg	15–3	15–9	15–12			45–24
10 Sep	Brazil	3–0	Israel	15–5	15–3	15–2			45–10
10 Sep	France	3–0	West Germany	15–4	15–5	15–5			45–14

==== Final places ====
Pos	Team	Pld	W	L	Pts	SW	SL	SR	SPW	SPL	SPR
1	Soviet Union	9	9	0	18	27	2	13.500	439	218	2.014
2	Romania	9	8	1	17	26	11	2.364	510	382	1.335
3	Poland	9	6	3	15	22	13	1.692	461	386	1.194
4	Czechoslovakia	9	6	3	15	22	10	2.200	423	285	1.484
5	Bulgaria	9	5	4	14	18	14	1.286	390	359	1.086
6	China	9	3	6	12	14	21	0.667	366	446	0.821
7	North Korea	9	3	6	12	10	23	0.435	368	434	0.848
8	East Germany	9	3	6	12	13	21	0.619	337	451	0.747
9	United States	9	2	7	11	11	23	0.478	329	448	0.734
10	Netherlands	9	0	9	9	3	27	0.111	222	436	0.509

Date		Score		Set 1	Set 2	Set 3	Set 4	Set 5	Total
2 Sep	United States	3–0	Netherlands	15–3	15–6	15–9			45–18
2 Sep	Czechoslovakia	3–1	Bulgaria	15–3	7–15	15–12	15–12		52–42
2 Sep	East Germany	3–1	Poland	15–12	15–12	13–15	16–14		59–53
2 Sep	Soviet Union	3–0	China	15–8	15–0	15–9			45–17
3 Sep	Poland	3–2	Czechoslovakia	10–15	15–6	15–13	7–15	16–14	63–63
3 Sep	Romania	3–0	East Germany	15–6	16–14	15–7			46–27
3 Sep	North Korea	3–1	Netherlands	15–5	15–12	9–15	15–8		54–40
3 Sep	Bulgaria	3–1	China	8–15	15–5	15–5	15–12		53–37
5 Sep	Soviet Union	3–0	North Korea	15–6	15–6	17–15			47–27
5 Sep	Bulgaria	3–1	United States	15–3	15–17	15–5	15–5		60–30
5 Sep	Czechoslovakia	3–0	East Germany	15–5	15–7	15–5			45–17
5 Sep	Romania	3–0	Netherlands	15–6	15–10	15–5			45–21
6 Sep	Poland	3–0	United States	15–4	15–10	15–6			45–20
6 Sep	East Germany	3–1	Netherlands	15–9	15–9	10–15	15–6		55–39
6 Sep	Soviet Union	3–2	Romania	12–15	11–15	15–6	15–12	15–8	68–56
6 Sep	Bulgaria	3–0	North Korea	15–9	15–13	15–9			45–31
6 Sep	Czechoslovakia	3–0	China	15–0	15–2	15–4			45–6
8 Sep	Poland	3–1	North Korea	14–16	15–8	15–10	15–4		59–38
8 Sep	Soviet Union	3–0	Netherlands	15–2	15–4	15–3			45–9
8 Sep	Czechoslovakia	3–0	United States	15–5	15–10	15–3			45–18
8 Sep	Romania	3–2	Bulgaria	10–15	13–15	15–9	15–9	15–8	68–56
8 Sep	China	3–2	East Germany	15–1	4–15	14–16	15–9	15–10	63–51
9 Sep	Czechoslovakia	3–0	North Korea	15–3	15–13	15–5			45–21
9 Sep	Soviet Union	3–0	East Germany	15–1	15–3	15–1			45–5
9 Sep	United States	3–2	China	10–15	10–15	15–12	15–8	15–9	65–59
9 Sep	Bulgaria	3–0	Netherlands	15–11	15–7	15–12			45–30
9 Sep	Romania	3–2	Poland	15–11	12–15	15–4	13–15	16–14	71–59
10 Sep	Romania	3–2	Czechoslovakia	10–15	11–15	15–6	15–8	15–13	66–57
10 Sep	China	3–0	North Korea	16–14	15–10	15–12			46–36
10 Sep	Soviet Union	3–0	Bulgaria	15–13	15–7	15–10			45–30
10 Sep	East Germany	3–1	United States	15–13	16–14	7–15	15–10		53–52
10 Sep	Poland	3–0	Netherlands	15–9	15–3	15–12			45–24
11 Sep	North Korea	3–2	United States	15–13	15–3	7–15	14–16	15–11	66–58
11 Sep	Romania	3–1	China	15–8	15–8	11–15	15–7		56–38
11 Sep	Soviet Union	3–1	Poland	15–4	9–15	15–6	15–6		54–31
12 Sep	Poland	3–0	Bulgaria	15–3	15–9	15–2			45–14
12 Sep	Romania	3–1	United States	12–15	15–2	15–4	15–3		57–24
12 Sep	North Korea	3–2	East Germany	15–5	5–15	13–15	15–8	15–6	63–49
12 Sep	China	3–1	Netherlands	15–3	15–11	12–15	15–5		57–34
12 Sep	Soviet Union	3–0	Czechoslovakia	15–13	15–8	15–5			45–26

== Final standing ==
Rank	Team
1st place, gold medalist(s)	Soviet Union
2nd place, silver medalist(s)	Romania
3rd place, bronze medalist(s)	Poland
4	Czechoslovakia
5	Bulgaria
6	China
7	North Korea
8	East Germany
9	United States
10	Netherlands
11	Brazil
12	France
13	Belgium
14	Israel
15	Austria
16	West Germany
17	Luxembourg

1956 Women's World champions

Soviet Union
2nd title

Team roster
Lidia Boldireva, Ludmila Buldakova, Aleksandra Tschudina, Skaidra Galachova, Kira Gorbachova, Sofia Gorbunova, Lidia Ivanetskaya, Militia Kononova, Lidia Kalenjik, Ludmila Metscheryakova, Antonina Moiseyeva, Lidia Strelnikova, Valentina Varkevitsch
Head coach
Alexey Yakushev

== Aftermath ==
The Soviet Union retained the title at the next championship in Brazil in 1960, completing a hat-trick of world crowns before their run of dominance was ended by the rise of Japan, champions in 1962. Captain Aleksandra Chudina was part of all three Soviet title-winning teams (1952, 1956 and 1960), making her one of the most decorated players of the era in addition to her achievements in track and field athletics.

The Paris tournament also proved significant off the court. With 17 women's teams and 24 men's teams drawn from four continents, the 1956 championships demonstrated the sport's international breadth shortly after the FIVB's first decade, and the following year — to the day, almost, of the anniversary of the tournament — the IOC voted at its session in Sofia to add volleyball to the Olympic programme for Tokyo 1964. Several of the debutant nations of 1956 went on to shape the future of the women's game: China, sixth in Paris, would win back-to-back world titles in 1982 and 1986, while Brazil, eleventh on their first appearance, later became perennial contenders for the title.
