= 1970 FIVB Women's Volleyball World Championship =

Volleyball competition held in Bulgaria

1970 FIVB Women's World Championship
Tournament details
- Host country: Bulgaria
- Dates: 22 September – 2 October
- Teams: 16
- Venue: (in 4 host cities)

Final positions
- Champions: Soviet Union (4th title)
- Runners-up: Japan
- Third place: North Korea
- Fourth place: Hungary

The 1970 FIVB Women's World Championship was the sixth edition of the tournament, organised by the world's governing body, the FIVB. It was held from 22 September to 2 October 1970 in Bulgaria.

== Teams ==
- Brazil
- Bulgaria
- Cuba
- Czechoslovakia
- East Germany
- Hungary
- Japan
- Mexico
- Mongolia
- Netherlands
- North Korea
- Peru
- Poland
- Romania
- Soviet Union
- United States

== Venues ==
Pool A	Pool B	Host cities in Bulgaria
Sevlievo	Sofia	Host cities in Bulgaria
Capacity:	Capacity:	Host cities in Bulgaria
Pool C, Final round	Pool D, Final round	Host cities in Bulgaria
Burgas	Varna	Host cities in Bulgaria
Capacity:	Capacity:	Host cities in Bulgaria

== Format ==
The tournament was played in two different stages (first and final rounds). In the First round, the 16 participants were divided in four groups of four teams each. A single round-robin format was played within each group to determine the teams group position, all teams progressed to the next round.

In the Final round, two groups were created (1st-8th and 9th-16th), teams were allocated to a group according to their First round group position (best two teams of each group going to 1st-8th and the remaining teams to 9th-16th). A single round-robin format was played within each group with matches already played between teams in the First round also counted in this round.

== Pools composition ==
Pool A	Pool B	Pool C	Pool D
Bulgaria	Czechoslovakia	North Korea	Brazil
Cuba	Japan	Poland	Hungary
East Germany	Mexico	Romania	Peru
Mongolia	Netherlands	United States	Soviet Union

== Results ==
=== First round ===
==== Pool A ====
Location: Sevlievo

Pos	Team	Pld	W	L	Pts	SW	SL	SR	SPW	SPL	SPR	Qualification
1	Bulgaria	3	3	0	6	9	2	4.500	165	98	1.684	Final places
2	Cuba	3	2	1	5	6	7	0.857	162	145	1.117	Final places
3	East Germany	3	1	2	4	6	7	0.857	138	144	0.958	9th–16th places
4	Mongolia	3	0	3	3	4	9	0.444	104	182	0.571	9th–16th places

Date	Time		Score		Set 1	Set 2	Set 3	Set 4	Set 5	Total
22 Sep	17:30	East Germany	3–1	Mongolia	15–1	11–15	15–3	15–4		56–23
22 Sep	19:30	Bulgaria	3–0	Cuba	15–10	16–14	15–10			46–34
23 Sep	17:30	Bulgaria	3–1	East Germany	14–16	15–4	15–8	15–3		59–31
23 Sep	19:30	Cuba	3–2	Mongolia	15–4	8–15	13–15	15–2	15–12	66–48
24 Sep	17:30	Cuba	3–2	East Germany	5–15	12–15	15–7	15–11	15–3	62–51
24 Sep	19:30	Bulgaria	3–1	Mongolia	15–3	15–17	15–6	15–7		60–33

==== Pool B ====
Location: Sofia

Pos	Team	Pld	W	L	Pts	SW	SL	SR	SPW	SPL	SPR	Qualification
1	Japan	3	3	0	6	9	0	MAX	135	41	3.293	Final places
2	Czechoslovakia	3	2	1	5	6	3	2.000	103	81	1.272	Final places
3	Mexico	3	1	2	4	3	6	0.500	93	121	0.769	9th–16th places
4	Netherlands	3	0	3	3	0	9	0.000	48	136	0.353	9th–16th places

Date	Time		Score		Set 1	Set 2	Set 3	Set 4	Set 5	Total
22 Sep		Japan	3–0	Czechoslovakia	15–8	15–2	15–3			45–13
22 Sep		Mexico	3–0	Netherlands	15–7	16–14	15–10			46–31
23 Sep	16:00	Czechoslovakia	3–0	Mexico	15–13	15–5	15–9			45–27
23 Sep	18:00	Japan	3–0	Netherlands	15–4	15–2	15–2			45–8
24 Sep	12:00	Czechoslovakia	3–0	Netherlands	15–2	15–4	15–3			45–9
24 Sep	16:00	Japan	3–0	Mexico	15–2	15–7	15–11			45–20

==== Pool C ====
Location: Burgas

Pos	Team	Pld	W	L	Pts	SW	SL	SR	SPW	SPL	SPR	Qualification
1	North Korea	3	3	0	6	9	2	4.500	163	123	1.325	Final places
2	Romania	3	2	1	5	6	6	1.000	157	152	1.033	Final places
3	Poland	3	1	2	4	7	8	0.875	187	194	0.964	9th–16th places
4	United States	3	0	3	3	3	9	0.333	137	175	0.783	9th–16th places

Date	Time		Score		Set 1	Set 2	Set 3	Set 4	Set 5	Total
22 Sep	17:30	North Korea	3–0	Romania	15–5	15–8	16–14			46–27
22 Sep	19:30	Poland	3–2	United States	15–7	15–6	12–15	11–15	15–11	68–54
23 Sep	17:30	Romania	3–2	Poland	15–5	8–15	16–14	15–17	15–6	69–57
23 Sep	19:30	North Korea	3–0	United States	16–14	15–7	15–13			46–34
24 Sep	17:30	Romania	3–1	United States	13–15	15–8	15–10	18–16		61–49
24 Sep	19:30	North Korea	3–2	Poland	12–15	15–7	14–16	15–13	15–11	71–62

==== Pool D ====
Location: Varna

Pos	Team	Pld	W	L	Pts	SW	SL	SR	SPW	SPL	SPR	Qualification
1	Soviet Union	3	3	0	6	9	0	MAX	135	54	2.500	Final places
2	Hungary	3	2	1	5	6	6	1.000	136	136	1.000	Final places
3	Brazil	3	1	2	4	5	6	0.833	131	140	0.936	9th–16th places
4	Peru	3	0	3	3	1	9	0.111	79	151	0.523	9th–16th places

Date	Time		Score		Set 1	Set 2	Set 3	Set 4	Set 5	Total
22 Sep	17:30	Hungary	3–2	Brazil	15–5	15–12	3–15	10–15	15–12	58–59
22 Sep	19:30	Soviet Union	3–0	Peru	15–1	15–5	15–4			45–10
23 Sep	17:30	Hungary	3–1	Peru	15–0	15–9	13–15	15–8		58–32
23 Sep	19:30	Soviet Union	3–0	Brazil	15–12	15–5	15–7			45–24
24 Sep	17:30	Soviet Union	3–0	Hungary	15–4	15–6	15–10			45–20
24 Sep	19:30	Brazil	3–0	Peru	15–9	15–12	18–16			48–37

=== Final round ===
The results and the points of the matches between the same teams that were already played during the first round are taken into account for the final round.

==== 9th–16th places ====
Location: Burgas

Pos	Team	Pld	W	L	Pts	SW	SL	SR	SPW	SPL	SPR
9	Poland	7	7	0	14	21	3	7.000	351	202	1.738
10	East Germany	7	6	1	13	18	7	2.571	341	239	1.427
11	United States	7	5	2	12	19	11	1.727	405	340	1.191
12	Mexico	7	4	3	11	15	12	1.250	343	322	1.065
13	Brazil	7	3	4	10	12	13	0.923	304	321	0.947
14	Peru	7	2	5	9	7	15	0.467	255	295	0.864
15	Netherlands	7	1	6	8	5	19	0.263	227	328	0.692
16	Mongolia	7	0	7	7	4	21	0.190	184	363	0.507

Date		Score		Set 1	Set 2	Set 3	Set 4	Set 5	Total
26 Sep	Poland	3–0	Mexico	15–8	16–14	15–2			46–24
26 Sep	United States	3–1	Brazil	15–17	15–12	15–4	15–7		60–40
26 Sep	Peru	3–0	Mongolia	15–13	15–12	15–9			45–34
26 Sep	East Germany	3–0	Netherlands	15–5	15–10	15–4			45–19
27 Sep	Poland	3–1	Brazil	15–8	15–7	11–15	15–11		56–41
27 Sep	East Germany	3–2	United States	15–13	11–15	15–9	12–15	15–8	68–60
27 Sep	Peru	3–0	Netherlands	15–12	15–6	15–0			45–18
27 Sep	Mexico	3–1	Mongolia	14–16	15–1	15–6	15–4		59–27
28 Sep	United States	3–2	Netherlands	15–4	16–14	13–15	9–15	15–6	68–54
28 Sep	Poland	3–0	East Germany	15–7	15–6	15–13			45–26
28 Sep	Brazil	3–1	Mongolia	15–9	15–11	11–15	15–7		56–42
28 Sep	Mexico	3–1	Peru	15–9	13–15	15–11	15–8		58–43
30 Sep	Poland	3–0	Netherlands	15–4	15–5	15–12			45–21
30 Sep	United States	3–0	Mongolia	15–5	15–3	15–7			45–15
30 Sep	Mexico	3–1	Brazil	15–13	7–15	15–9	15–12		52–49
30 Sep	East Germany	3–0	Peru	15–6	15–8	16–14			46–28
1 Oct	Brazil	3–0	Netherlands	15–11	15–5	15–11			45–27
1 Oct	United States	3–0	Peru	15–12	15–10	15–8			45–30
1 Oct	East Germany	3–1	Mexico	7–15	15–2	15–8	16–14		53–39
1 Oct	Poland	3–0	Mongolia	15–1	15–4	15–4			45–9
2 Oct	East Germany	3–0	Brazil	15–6	15–4	17–15			47–25
2 Oct	Netherlands	3–1	Mongolia	15–5	12–15	15–5	15–9		57–34
2 Oct	Poland	3–0	Peru	15–6	15–7	16–14			46–27
2 Oct	United States	3–2	Mexico	15–12	15–8	14–16	13–15	16–14	73–65

==== Final places ====
Location: Varna

Pos	Team	Pld	W	L	Pts	SW	SL	SR	SPW	SPL	SPR
1	Soviet Union	7	7	0	14	21	1	21.000	329	155	2.123
2	Japan	7	6	1	13	19	5	3.800	326	169	1.929
3	North Korea	7	4	3	11	14	11	1.273	317	249	1.273
4	Hungary	7	4	3	11	15	13	1.154	319	325	0.982
5	Czechoslovakia	7	3	4	10	12	16	0.750	310	369	0.840
6	Bulgaria	7	3	4	10	10	15	0.667	256	334	0.766
7	Romania	7	1	6	8	7	19	0.368	263	343	0.767
8	Cuba	7	0	7	7	3	21	0.143	182	358	0.508

Date	Time		Score		Set 1	Set 2	Set 3	Set 4	Set 5	Total
26 Sep	10:00	Soviet Union	3–0	Cuba	15–3	15–5	15–2			45–10
26 Sep	16:00	Hungary	3–1	Romania	15–6	15–12	13–15	15–9		58–42
26 Sep	18:00	Bulgaria	3–1	Czechoslovakia	19–21	15–13	15–7	15–9		64–50
26 Sep	20:00	Japan	3–1	North Korea	6–15	15–5	16–14	15–12		52–46
27 Sep	10:00	Romania	3–1	Cuba	16–18	15–6	15–5	15–9		61–38
27 Sep	16:00	Czechoslovakia	3–1	North Korea	15–12	15–11	8–15	15–12		53–50
27 Sep	18:00	Hungary	3–1	Bulgaria	15–5	15–6	5–15	16–14		51–40
27 Sep	20:00	Soviet Union	3–1	Japan	15–10	15–12	14–16	15–6		59–44
28 Sep	10:00	North Korea	3–2	Hungary	11–15	10–15	15–3	15–7	15–12	66–52
28 Sep	16:00	Japan	3–0	Cuba	15–5	15–1	15–2			45–8
28 Sep	18:00	Soviet Union	3–0	Czechoslovakia	15–5	15–6	15–8			45–19
28 Sep	20:00	Bulgaria	3–2	Romania	10–15	15–12	15–8	5–15	16–14	61–64
30 Sep	10:00	Soviet Union	3–0	Romania	15–4	15–5	15–9			45–18
30 Sep	16:00	Czechoslovakia	3–2	Cuba	15–3	13–15	15–11	11–15	15–11	69–55
30 Sep	18:00	North Korea	3–0	Bulgaria	15–5	15–1	15–3			45–9
30 Sep	20:00	Japan	3–1	Hungary	15–4	5–15	15–0	15–3		50–22
1 Oct	10:00	North Korea	3–0	Cuba	15–3	15–2	15–6			45–11
1 Oct	16:00	Japan	3–0	Romania	15–2	15–1	15–7			45–10
1 Oct	18:00	Soviet Union	3–0	Bulgaria	15–12	15–8	15–5			45–25
1 Oct	20:00	Hungary	3–2	Czechoslovakia	15–7	15–7	14–16	10–15	15–11	69–56
2 Oct	10:00	Hungary	3–0	Cuba	15–8	15–3	17–15			47–26
2 Oct	16:00	Czechoslovakia	3–1	Romania	5–15	15–6	15–7	15–13		50–41
2 Oct	18:00	Japan	3–0	Bulgaria	15–3	15–5	15–3			45–11
2 Oct	20:00	Soviet Union	3–0	North Korea	15–2	15–11	15–6			45–19

== Final standing ==
Rank	Team
1st place, gold medalist(s)	Soviet Union
2nd place, silver medalist(s)	Japan
3rd place, bronze medalist(s)	North Korea
4	Hungary
5	Czechoslovakia
6	Bulgaria
7	Romania
8	Cuba
9	Poland
10	East Germany
11	United States
12	Mexico
13	Brazil
14	Peru
15	Netherlands
16	Mongolia

Qualified for the 1972 Olympic Games as reigning champions
Qualified for the 1972 Olympic Games

1970 Women's World champions

Soviet Union
4th title

Team roster
Ludmila Buldakova, Vera Duyunova, Vera Lantratova, Galina Leontieva, Ludmila Michailovskaya, Inna Ryskal, Tatyana Tretyakova, Rosa Salichova, Tatyana Sarytscheva, Nina Smoleyeva, Liubov Turina, Marita Batutite
Head coach
