= 1960 FIVB Women's Volleyball World Championship =

1960 FIVB Women's World Championship
Campeonato Mundial de Feminino Brasil 1960

Tournament details
- Host country: Brazil
- Dates: 29 October – 13 November
- Teams: 10
- Venue: (in 6 host cities)

Final positions
- Champions: Soviet Union (3rd title)

The 1960 FIVB Women's World Championship was the third edition of the tournament, organised by the world's governing body, the FIVB. It was held from 29 October to 13 November 1960 in Brazil.

== Teams ==
- Argentina
- Brazil
- Czechoslovakia
- Japan
- Peru
- Poland
- Soviet Union
- United States
- Uruguay
- West Germany

== Venues ==
Pool A	Pool B, C	Final round	Host cities in Brazil
São Paulo	Belo Horizonte	Resende	Host cities in Brazil
Capacity:	Capacity:	Capacity:	Host cities in Brazil
Final round	Final round	Final round	Host cities in Brazil
Volta Redonda	Niterói	Rio de Janeiro	Host cities in Brazil
Capacity:	Capacity:	Capacity:	Host cities in Brazil

== Format ==
The tournament was played in two different stages (first and final rounds). In the First round, the 10 participants were divided in three groups (one group of four teams and two groups of three teams). A single round-robin format was played within each group to determine the teams group position, all teams progressed to the next round.

In the Final round, two groups were created (1st-6th and 7th-10th), teams were allocated to a group according to their First round group position (best two teams of each group going to 1st-6th and the remaining teams to 7th-10th). A single round-robin format was played within each group with matches already played between teams in the First round also counted in this round.

== Pools composition ==
Pool A	Pool B	Pool C
Argentina	Brazil	Czechoslovakia
Japan	United States	Peru
Poland	West Germany	Soviet Union
Uruguay		

== Results ==
=== First round ===
==== Pool A ====
Pos	Team	Pld	W	L	Pts	SW	SL	SR	SPW	SPL	SPR	Qualification
1	Japan	3	3	0	6	9	0	MAX	135	38	3.553	Final places
2	Poland	3	2	1	5	6	3	2.000	120	62	1.935	Final places
3	Argentina	3	1	2	4	3	7	0.429	63	139	0.453	7th–10th places
4	Uruguay	3	0	3	3	1	9	0.111	66	145	0.455	7th–10th places

Location: Santos

Date		Score		Set 1	Set 2	Set 3	Set 4	Set 5	Total
29 Oct	Japan	3–0	Argentina	15–2	15–0	15–4			45–6

Location: Santo André

Date		Score		Set 1	Set 2	Set 3	Set 4	Set 5	Total
29 Oct	Poland	3–0	Uruguay	15–2	15–5	15–8			45–15

Location: São Paulo

Date		Score		Set 1	Set 2	Set 3	Set 4	Set 5	Total
30 Oct	Japan	3–0	Uruguay	15–0	15–1	15–1			45–2

Location: Santos

Date		Score		Set 1	Set 2	Set 3	Set 4	Set 5	Total
30 Oct	Poland	3–0	Argentina	15–0	15–2	15–0			45–2
31 Oct	Japan	3–0	Poland	15–12	15–7	15–11			45–30

Location: Santo André

Date		Score		Set 1	Set 2	Set 3	Set 4	Set 5	Total
31 Oct	Argentina	3–1	Uruguay	10–15	15–11	15–11	15–12		55–49

==== Pool B ====
Location: Belo Horizonte

Pos	Team	Pld	W	L	Pts	SW	SL	SR	SPW	SPL	SPR	Qualification
1	Brazil	2	2	0	4	6	0	MAX	90	43	2.093	Final places
2	United States	2	1	1	3	3	3	1.000	76	65	1.169	Final places
3	West Germany	2	0	2	2	0	6	0.000	32	90	0.356	7th–10th places

Date		Score		Set 1	Set 2	Set 3	Set 4	Set 5	Total
29 Oct	Brazil	3–0	West Germany	15–4	15–3	15–5			45–12
30 Oct	United States	3–0	West Germany	15–6	15–13	15–1			45–20
31 Oct	Brazil	3–0	United States	15–13	15–11	15–7			45–31

==== Pool C ====
Location: Belo Horizonte

Pos	Team	Pld	W	L	Pts	SW	SL	SR	SPW	SPL	SPR	Qualification
1	Soviet Union	2	2	0	4	6	0	MAX	90	35	2.571	Final places
2	Czechoslovakia	2	1	1	3	3	3	1.000	72	56	1.286	Final places
3	Peru	2	0	2	2	0	6	0.000	19	90	0.211	7th–10th places

Date		Score		Set 1	Set 2	Set 3	Set 4	Set 5	Total
29 Oct	Soviet Union	3–0	Peru	15–4	15–1	15–3			45–8
30 Oct	Soviet Union	3–0	Czechoslovakia	15–10	15–8	15–9			45–27
31 Oct	Czechoslovakia	3–0	Peru	15–3	15–5	15–3			45–11

=== Final round ===
The results and the points of the matches between the same teams that were already played during the first round are taken into account for the final round.

==== 7th–10th places ====
Location: Volta Redonda

Pos	Team	Pld	W	L	Pts	SW	SL	SR	SPW	SPL	SPR
7	Peru	3	2	1	5	7	4	1.750	159	120	1.325
8	Argentina	3	2	1	5	8	5	1.600	176	176	1.000
9	Uruguay	3	1	2	4	5	6	0.833	136	144	0.944
10	West Germany	3	1	2	4	3	8	0.375	124	155	0.800

Date		Score		Set 1	Set 2	Set 3	Set 4	Set 5	Total
5 Nov	Peru	3–0	West Germany	15–10	15–5	15–7			45–22
7 Nov	Peru	3–1	Uruguay	15–8	15–8	13–15	15–10		58–41
7 Nov	West Germany	3–2	Argentina	18–16	11–15	12–15	15–5	15–13	71–64
9 Nov	Uruguay	3–0	West Germany	15–7	16–14	15–10			46–31
9 Nov	Argentina	3–1	Peru	15–12	17–15	9–15	16–14		57–56

==== Final places ====
Location: Rio de Janeiro and Niterói

Pos	Team	Pld	W	L	Pts	SW	SL	SR	SPW	SPL	SPR
1	Soviet Union	5	5	0	10	15	4	3.750	269	198	1.359
2	Japan	5	4	1	9	13	5	2.600	246	181	1.359
3	Czechoslovakia	5	3	2	8	10	7	1.429	210	208	1.010
4	Poland	5	2	3	7	8	11	0.727	223	225	0.991
5	Brazil	5	1	4	6	7	12	0.583	197	235	0.838
6	United States	5	0	5	5	1	15	0.067	141	239	0.590

Date	Venue		Score		Set 1	Set 2	Set 3	Set 4	Set 5	Total
3 Nov	Rio	Czechoslovakia	3–0	Brazil	15–13	15–13	15–6			45–32
4 Nov	Rio	Soviet Union	3–0	United States	16–14	15–5	15–5			46–24
5 Nov	Rio	Soviet Union	3–1	Japan	15–6	12–15	15–13	15–13		57–47
6 Nov	Rio	Czechoslovakia	3–0	Poland	15–12	15–12	15–9			45–33
8 Nov	Rio	Poland	3–2	Brazil	15–3	15–8	3–15	2–15	15–7	50–48
8 Nov	Niterói	Japan	3–0	United States	15–2	15–13	15–7			45–22
10 Nov	Rio	Soviet Union	3–2	Poland	8–15	15–8	9–15	15–13	16–14	63–65
10 Nov	Niterói	Czechoslovakia	3–1	United States	15–8	13–15	15–10	15–7		58–40
11 Nov	Rio	Japan	3–1	Brazil	15–8	6–15	15–7	15–7		51–37
12 Nov	Niterói	Poland	3–0	United States	15–13	15–8	15–3			45–24
12 Nov	Rio	Japan	3–1	Czechoslovakia	15–13	13–15	15–6	15–1		58–35
13 Nov	Rio	Soviet Union	3–1	Brazil	13–15	15–9	15–5	15–6		58–35

== Final standing ==
Rank	Team
1st place, gold medalist(s)	Soviet Union
2nd place, silver medalist(s)	Japan
3rd place, bronze medalist(s)	Czechoslovakia
4	Poland
5	Brazil
6	United States
7	Peru
8	Argentina
9	Uruguay
10	West Germany

1960 Women's World champions

Soviet Union
3rd title

Team roster
Lidia Boldireva, Ludmila Buldakova, Aleksandra Tschudina, Liliya Konovalova, Alica Krasenyinikova, Ludmila Michailovskaya, Skaidrite Plisman, Antonina Rischova, Lidia Strelnikova, Valentina Varkevitsch, Antonina Volodina, Militia Yeremeyeva
Head coach
Alexey Yakushev
