= List of FIVB Men's Volleyball World Cup finals =

FIVB Men's Volleyball World Cup final
- Founded: 1949; 77 years ago
- Most recent champion: Italy (5nd title)
- Most titles: Soviet Union (6 titles)

The FIVB Men's Volleyball World Cup is an international volleyball competition contested by the senior men's national teams of the Fédération Internationale de Volleyball (FIVB), the sport's global governing body. The tournament was held every four years until 2022 and has been rescheduled to take place every two years starting from 2025. The extant World Cup was renamed from the World Championship in 2026.

Since 1978, the World Cup final is the last match of the competition, played by the only two teams remaining in contention, and the result determines which country is declared the world champion. Prior to that, the competition used a round-robin format in the final round, consisting of 4 to 10 teams that advanced from the preliminary rounds, and the world champion was determined based on the team with the best ranking in the final standings.

The team that wins the final receives the FIVB Volleyball World Championship Trophy, and its name is engraved on the bottom side of the trophy. The new trophy was designed by the Swiss design company BMCO and was first awarded to the United States in 2014. However, during the trophy tour in Rio de Janeiro, Brazil, in 2014, both the men's and women's World Championship trophies were stolen. As a result, the FIVB had to create new trophies to ensure they were available for the competition.

Of 68 different nations that have appeared in the tournament, 13 have made it to the final, and 7 have won. The former Soviet Union is also the most successful team in the competition. Next, Italy has 5 triumphs, Brazil and Poland have 3 each, Czechoslovakia has 2, and the United States and East Germany have 1 each.

Italy defeated Bulgaria in five sets in the latest final, staged at the Philippines' SM Mall of Asia Arena in 2025.

== List of final matches ==
Key to the list
†	Match was a round-robin contest between the champions and runners-up, not a final match.
‡	Match was won on the fifth set.

List of FIVB Volleyball World Cup finals
Year	Winners	Score	Runners-up	Venue	Location	Attendance	Ref.
1949	Soviet Union	3–1†	Czechoslovakia	–	Praga, Czechoslovakia	—N/a	
1952	Soviet Union	3–0†	Czechoslovakia	Dynamo Stadium	Moscow, Soviet Union	—N/a	
1956	Czechoslovakia	3–2†	Romania	–	Paris, France	—N/a	
1960	Soviet Union	3–0†	Japan	–	Rio de Janeiro, Brazil	—N/a	
1962	Soviet Union	3–0†	Czechoslovakia	–	Moscow, Soviet Union	—N/a	
1966	Czechoslovakia	3–1†	Romania	Nippon Budokan	Tokyo, Japan	—N/a	
1970	East Germany	3–1†	Bulgaria	Festivalna Hall	Sofia, Bulgaria	—N/a	
1974	Poland	3–2†	Soviet Union	Auditorio Nacional	Mexico City, Mexico	—N/a	
1978	Soviet Union	3–0	Italy	—	Rome, Italy	—N/a	
1982	Soviet Union	3–0	Brazil	Luna Park	Buenos Aires, Argentina	—N/a	
1986	United States	3–1	Soviet Union	—	Paris, France	—N/a	
1990	Italy	3–1	Cuba	Maracanãzinho	Rio de Janeiro, Brazil	—N/a	
1994	Italy	3–1	Netherlands	Peace and Friendship Stadium	Piraeus, Greece	—N/a	
1998	Italy	3–0	FR Yugoslavia	Yoyogi National Gymnasium	Tokyo, Japan	—N/a	
2002	Brazil	3–2‡	Russia	Luna Park	Buenos Aires, Argentina	—N/a	
2006	Brazil	3–0	Poland	Yoyogi National Gymnasium	Tokyo, Japan	—N/a	
2010	Brazil	3–0	Cuba	PalaLottomatica	Roma, Italy	12,000	
2014	Poland	3–1	Brazil	Spodek	Katowice, Poland	12,528	
2018	Poland	3–0	Brazil	Inalpi Arena	Turin, Italy	11,500	
2022	Italy	3–1	Poland	Spodek	Katowice, Poland	9,639	
2025	Italy	3–1	Bulgaria	SM Mall of Asia Arena	Pasay, Philippines	16,429	
2027				Arena Kraków	Kraków, Poland		

== Results ==
Results by nation
Team	Winners	Runners-up	Total finals	Years won	Years runners-up
Soviet Union	6	2	8	1949,1952, 1960, 1962, 1978, 1982	1974, 1986
Italy	5	1	6	1990, 1994, 1998, 2022, 2025	1978
Brazil	3	3	6	2002, 2006, 2010	1982, 2014, 2018
Poland	3	2	5	1974, 2014, 2018	2006, 2022,
Czechoslovakia	2	4	6	1956, 1966	1949, 1952, 1960, 1962
United States	1	0	1	1986	—N/a
East Germany	1	0	1	1970	—N/a
Bulgaria	0	2	2	—N/a	1970, 2025
Cuba	0	2	2	—N/a	1990, 2010
Romania	0	2	2	—N/a	1956, 1966
Netherlands	0	1	1	—N/a	1994
FR Yugoslavia	0	1	1	—N/a	1998
Russia	0	1	1	—N/a	2002

Results by confederation
Confederation	Appearances	Winners	Runners-up
CEV	33	17	16
NORCECA	3	1	2
CSV	6	3	3

== See also ==
- List of FIVB Women's Volleyball World Cup finals
- National team appearances in the FIVB Men's Volleyball World Cup
