= National team appearances in the FIVB Volleyball World Championship =

National team appearances in the FIVB Volleyball World Championship may refer to:

- National team appearances in the FIVB Men's Volleyball World Championship
- National team appearances in the FIVB Women's Volleyball World Championship
