= List of FIVB Women's Volleyball World Cup finals =

FIVB Women's Volleyball World Cup final
- Founded: 1952; 74 years ago
- Most recent champion: Italy (2nd title)
- Most titles: Soviet Union (5 titles)

The FIVB Women's Volleyball World Cup is an international volleyball competition contested by the senior women's national teams of the Fédération Internationale de Volleyball (FIVB), the sport's global governing body. The tournament was held every four years until 2022 and has been rescheduled to take place every two years starting from 2025. The extant World Cup was renamed from the World Championship in 2026.

Since 1978, the World Cup final is the last match of the competition, played by the only two teams remaining in contention, and the result determines which country is declared the world champion. Prior to that, the competition used a round-robin format in the final round, consisting of 4 to 10 teams that advanced from the preliminary rounds, and the world champion was determined based on the team with the best ranking in the final standings.

The team that wins the final receives the FIVB Volleyball World Championship Trophy, and its name is engraved on the bottom side of the trophy. The new trophy was designed by the Swiss design company BMCO and was first awarded to the United States in 2014. However, during the trophy tour in Rio de Janeiro, Brazil, in 2014, both the men's and women's World Championship trophies were stolen. As a result, the FIVB had to create new trophies to ensure they were available for the competition.

Of 66 different nations that have appeared in the tournament, 13 have made it to the final, and 8 have won. The former Soviet Union is also the most successful team in the competition, having won five titles and finished second twice. Japan and Cuba have three titles each. China, Russia, Serbia, and current champion Italy have two each, while the United States have one title.

Italy defeated Turkey in five sets in the latest final, staged at Thailand's Indoor Stadium Huamark in 2025.

== List of final matches ==
Locations of finals held in the rest of the world

Locations of finals held in Europe	Locations of finals held in Japan

Key to the list
†	Match was a round-robin contest between the champions and runners-up, not a final match.
‡	Match was won on the fifth set.

List of FIVB Women's Volleyball World Cup finals
Year	Winners	Score	Runners-up	Venue	Location	Attendance	Ref(s)
1952	Soviet Union	3–0†	Poland	Dynamo Stadium	Moscow, Soviet Union	—N/a	
1956	Soviet Union	3–2†	Romania	Stade Pierre de Coubertin	Paris, France	—N/a	
1960	Soviet Union	3–1†	Japan	Ginásio do Maracanãzinho	Rio de Janeiro, Brazil	—N/a	
1962	Japan	3–1†	Soviet Union	Luzhniki Palace of Sports	Moscow, Soviet Union	—N/a	
1967	Japan	3–0†	United States	Nippon Budokan	Tokyo, Japan	—N/a	
1970	Soviet Union	3–1†	Japan	Palace of Culture and Sports	Varna, Bulgaria	—N/a	
1974	Japan	3–0†	Soviet Union	Auditorio Benito Juarez	Guadalajara, Mexico	—N/a	
1978	Cuba	3–0	Japan	Yubileyny Sports Palace	Leningrad, Soviet Union	—N/a	
1982	China	3–0	Peru	Coliseo Amauta	Lima, Peru	—N/a	
1986	China	3–1	Cuba	Tipsport Arena	Prague, Czechoslovakia	—N/a	
1990	Soviet Union	3–1	China	Capital Indoor Stadium	Beijing, China	—N/a	
1994	Cuba	3–0	Brazil	Ginásio do Ibirapuera	São Paulo, Brazil	—N/a	
1998	Cuba	3–0	China	Osaka Municipal Central Gymnasium	Osaka, Japan	—N/a	
2002	Italy	3–2‡	United States	Max-Schmeling-Halle	Berlin, Germany	9,070	
2006	Russia	3–2‡	Brazil	Osaka Municipal Central Gymnasium	Osaka, Japan	3,820	
2010	Russia	3–2‡	Brazil	Yoyogi National Gymnasium	Tokyo, Japan	8,200	
2014	United States	3–1	China	Mediolanum Forum	Milan, Italy	12,600	
2018	Serbia	3–2‡	Italy	Yokohama Arena	Yokohama, Japan	11,500	
2022	Serbia	3–0	Brazil	Omnisport Arena	Apeldoorn, Netherlands	6,376	
2025	Italy	3–2‡	Turkey	Indoor Stadium Huamark	Bangkok, Thailand	5,719	
2027				Honda Center	Anaheim, United States		

== Results ==
Results by nation
Team	Winners	Runners-up	Total finals	Years won	Years runners-up
Soviet Union	5	2	7	1952, 1956, 1960, 1970, 1990	1962, 1974
Japan	3	3	6	1962, 1967, 1974	1960, 1970, 1978
Cuba	3	1	4	1978, 1994, 1998	1986
China	2	3	5	1982, 1986	1990, 1998, 2014
Italy	2	1	3	2002, 2025	2018
Russia	2	0	2	2006, 2010	—N/a
Serbia	2	0	2	2018, 2022	—N/a
United States	1	2	3	2014	1967, 2002
Brazil	0	4	4	—N/a	1994, 2006, 2010, 2022
Poland	0	1	1	—N/a	1952
Romania	0	1	1	—N/a	1956
Peru	0	1	1	—N/a	1982
Turkey	0	1	1	—N/a	2025

Results by confederation
Confederation	Appearances	Winners	Runners-up
CEV	17	11	6
AVC	11	5	6
NORCECA	7	4	3
CSV	5	0	5

== See also ==
- List of FIVB Men's Volleyball World Cup finals
- National team appearances in the FIVB Women's Volleyball World Cup
