= National team appearances in the FIVB Women's Volleyball World Cup =

This article gives the detailed results of each FIVB Women's Volleyball World Cup.

== Debut of national teams ==
A total of 66 national teams have participated in at least one tournament (until the 2025 tournament)

Year	Debutants	Total
1952	Bulgaria, Czechoslovakia, France, Hungary, India, Poland, Romania, Soviet Union	8
1956	Austria, Belgium, Brazil, China, East Germany, Israel, Luxembourg, Netherlands, North Korea, United States, West Germany	11
1960	Argentina, Japan, Peru, Uruguay	4
1962	None	0
1967	South Korea	1
1970	Cuba, Mexico, Mongolia	3
1974	Bahamas, Canada, Dominican Republic, Philippines, Puerto Rico	5
1978	Finland, Italy, Tunisia, Yugoslavia	4
1982	Australia, Chile, Indonesia, Nigeria, Paraguay, Spain	6
1986	None	0
1990	Chinese Taipei, Egypt	2
1994	Azerbaijan, Czech Republic, Germany, Kenya, Russia, Ukraine	6
1998	Croatia, Thailand	2
2002	Greece	1
2006	Cameroon, Costa Rica, Kazakhstan, Serbia and Montenegro, Turkey	5
2010	Algeria, Serbia	2
2014	None	0
2018	Trinidad and Tobago	1
2022	Colombia	1
2025	Slovakia, Slovenia, Sweden, Vietnam	4
2027	Switzerland	1
2029	TBD	TBD

== Comprehensive team results ==
Edition Host(s) (No. of teams) Team	1952 (Soviet Union) (8)	1956 (France) (17)	1960 (Brazil) (10)	1962 (Soviet Union) (14)	1967 (Japan) (4)	1970 (Bulgaria) (16)	1974 (Mexico) (24)	1978 (Soviet Union) (24)	1982 (Peru) (23)	1986 (Czechoslovakia) (16)	1990 (China) (16)	1994 (Brazil) (16)	1998 (Japan) (16)	2002 (Germany) (24)	2006 (Japan) (24)	2010 (Japan) (24)	2014 (Italy) (24)	2018 (Japan) (24)	2022 (Netherlands) (Poland) (24)	2025 (Thailand) (32)	2027 (Canada) (United States) (32)	2029 (Philippines) (32)	Total
Algeria	Part of France				•	•	•	•	•	•	•	•	•	•	•	21st	•	•	•	•	•	TBD	1
Argentina	•	•	8th	•	•	•	•	•	18th	•	15th	•	•	17th	•	•	17th	19th	16th	22nd	Q	TBD	9
Australia	•	•	•	•	•	•	•	•	12th	•	•	•	•	21st	•	•	•	•	•	•	•	TBD	2
Austria	•	15th	•	14th	•	•	•	•	•	•	•	•	•	•	•	•	•	•	•	•	•	TBD	2
Azerbaijan	Part of Soviet Union											9th	•	•	13th	•	15th	15th	•	•	•	TBD	4
Bahamas	•	•	•	•	•	•	23rd	•	•	•	•	•	•	•	•	•	•	•	•	•	•	TBD	1
Belgium	•	13th	•	•	•	•	•	22nd	•	•	•	•	•	•	•	•	11th	•	9th	11th	Q	TBD	6
Brazil	•	11th	5th	8th	•	13th	15th	7th	8th	5th	7th	2nd	4th	7th	2nd	2nd	3rd	7th	2nd	3rd	Q	TBD	19
Bulgaria	4th	5th	•	6th	•	6th	13th	9th	9th	12th	•	•	11th	8th	•	•	11th	12th	17th	27th	Q	TBD	15
Cameroon	•	•	•	•	•	•	•	•	•	•	•	•	•	•	21st	•	21st	21st	24th	32nd	Q	TBD	6
Canada	•	•	•	•	•	•	11th	14th	11th	15th	14th	•	•	17th	•	21st	17th	18th	10th	15th	Q	TBD	12
Chile	•	•	•	•	•	•	•	•	22nd	•	•	•	•	•	•	•	•	•	•	•	•	TBD	1
China	•	6th	•	9th	•	•	14th	6th	1st	1st	2nd	8th	2nd	4th	5th	10th	2nd	3rd	6th	9th	Q	TBD	17
Chinese Taipei	•	•	•	•	•	•	•	•	•	•	11th	•	•	•	12th	•	•	•	•	•	•	TBD	2
Colombia	•	•	•	•	•	•	•	•	•	•	•	•	•	•	•	•	•	•	21st	26th	Q	TBD	3
Costa Rica	•	•	•	•	•	•	•	•	•	•	•	•	•	•	17th	17th	•	•	•	•	•	TBD	2
Croatia	Part of Yugoslavia											•	6th	•	•	17th	13th	•	22nd	•	•	TBD	4
Cuba	•	•	•	•	•	8th	7th	1st	5th	2nd	4th	1st	1st	5th	7th	12th	21st	22nd	•	23rd	Q	TBD	15
Czech Republic	Part of Czechoslovakia											9th	•	17th	•	15th	•	•	18th	25th	Q	TBD	6
Czechoslovakia	3rd	4th	3rd	5th	•	5th	17th	12th	•	11th	•	Does not exist											8
Dominican Republic	•	•	•	•	•	•	21st	19th	•	•	•	•	11th	13th	17th	17th	5th	9th	11th	14th	Q	TBD	11
East Germany	•	8th	•	7th	•	10th	4th	8th	•	4th	12th	Part of Germany											7
Egypt	•	•	•	•	•	•	•	•	•	•	16th	•	•	21st	21st	•	•	•	•	29th	Q	TBD	5
Finland	•	•	•	•	•	•	•	21st	•	•	•	•	•	•	•	•	•	•	•	•	•	TBD	1
France	7th	12th	•	•	•	•	20th	•	•	•	•	•	•	•	•	•	•	•	•	8th	Q	TBD	5
Germany	See East Germany and West Germany											5th	13th	10th	11th	7th	9th	11th	14th	12th	Q	TBD	10
Greece	•	•	•	•	•	•	•	•	•	•	•	•	•	10th	•	•	•	•	•	21st	Q	TBD	3
Hungary	6th	•	•	11th	•	4th	6th	13th	10th	•	•	•	•	•	•	•	•	•	•	•	•	TBD	6
India	8th	•	•	•	•	•	•	•	•	•	•	•	•	•	•	•	•	•	•	•	•	TBD	1
Indonesia	•	•	•	•	•	•	•	•	21st	•	•	•	•	•	•	•	•	•	•	•	•	TBD	1
Israel	•	14th	•	•	•	•	•	•	•	•	•	•	•	•	•	•	•	•	•	•	•	TBD	1
Italy	•	•	•	•	•	•	•	20th	15th	9th	10th	13th	5th	1st	4th	5th	4th	2nd	3rd	1st	Q	TBD	14
Japan	•	•	2nd	1st	1st	2nd	1st	2nd	4th	7th	8th	7th	8th	13th	6th	3rd	7th	6th	5th	4th	Q	TBD	19
Kazakhstan	Part of Soviet Union											•	•	•	17th	21st	15th	24th	23rd	•	•	TBD	5
Kenya	•	•	•	•	•	•	•	•	•	•	•	13th	13th	21st	21st	21st	•	20th	19th	20th	Q	TBD	9
Luxembourg	•	17th	•	•	•	•	•	•	•	•	•	•	•	•	•	•	•	•	•	•	•	TBD	1
Mexico	•	•	•	•	•	12th	10th	15th	13th	•	•	•	•	21st	21st	•	21st	16th	•	24th	Q	TBD	10
Mongolia	•	•	•	•	•	16th	•	•	•	•	•	•	•	•	•	•	•	•	•	•	•	TBD	1
Netherlands	•	10th	•	12th	•	15th	16th	17th	16th	•	9th	9th	7th	9th	8th	11th	13th	4th	12th	6th	Q	TBD	16
Nigeria	•	•	•	•	•	•	•	•	23rd	•	•	•	•	•	•	•	•	•	•	•	•	TBD	1
North Korea	•	7th	•	10th	•	3rd	24th	24th	•	14th	•	•	•	•	•	•	•	•	•	•	•	TBD	6
Paraguay	•	•	•	•	•	•	•	•	19th	•	•	•	•	•	•	•	•	•	•	•	•	TBD	1
Peru	•	•	7th	•	4th	14th	8th	10th	2nd	3rd	6th	13th	9th	•	17th	15th	•	•	•	•	•	TBD	12
Philippines	•	•	•	•	•	•	18th	•	•	•	•	•	•	•	•	•	•	•	•	•	•	Q	2
Poland	2nd	3rd	4th	3rd	•	9th	9th	11th	•	•	•	•	•	13th	15th	9th	•	•	7th	7th	Q	TBD	13
Puerto Rico	•	•	•	•	•	•	22nd	•	17th	•	•	•	•	10th	15th	17th	17th	14th	15th	28th	Q	TBD	10
Romania	5th	2nd	•	4th	•	7th	5th	•	•	•	•	13th	•	13th	•	•	•	•	•	•	•	TBD	7
Russia	Part of Soviet Union											3rd	3rd	3rd	1st	1st	5th	8th	×	×	Q	TBD	7
Serbia	Part of Yugoslavia											Part of Serbia and Montenegro				8th	7th	1st	1st	10th	Q	TBD	6
Serbia and Montenegro	Part of Yugoslavia											•	•	•	3rd	Does not exist							1
Slovakia	Part of Czechoslovakia											•	•	•	•	•	•	•	•	30th	•	TBD	1
Slovenia	Part of Yugoslavia											•	•	•	•	•	•	•	•	16th	Q	TBD	2
South Korea	•	•	•	•	3rd	•	3rd	4th	7th	8th	5th	4th	9th	6th	13th	13th	•	17th	20th	•	Q	TBD	14
Soviet Union	1st	1st	1st	2nd	•	1st	2nd	3rd	6th	6th	1st	Does not exist											10
Spain	•	•	•	•	•	•	•	•	20th	•	•	•	•	•	•	•	•	•	•	18th	•	TBD	2
Sweden	•	•	•	•	•	•	•	•	•	•	•	•	•	•	•	•	•	•	•	19th	Q	TBD	2
Switzerland	•	•	•	•	•	•	•	•	•	•	•	•	•	•	•	•	•	•	•	•	Q	TBD	1
Thailand	•	•	•	•	•	•	•	•	•	•	•	•	13th	17th	•	13th	17th	13th	13th	13th	Q	TBD	8
Trinidad and Tobago	•	•	•	•	•	•	•	•	•	•	•	•	•	•	•	•	•	23rd	•	•	•	TBD	1
Tunisia	•	•	•	•	•	•	•	23rd	•	16th	•	•	•	•	•	•	21st	•	•	•	•	TBD	3
Turkey	•	•	•	•	•	•	•	•	•	•	•	•	•	•	10th	6th	9th	10th	8th	2nd	Q	TBD	7
Ukraine	Part of Soviet Union											9th	•	•	•	•	•	•	•	17th	Q	TBD	3
United States	•	9th	6th	•	2nd	11th	12th	5th	3rd	10th	3rd	6th	13th	2nd	9th	4th	1st	5th	4th	5th	Q	TBD	19
Uruguay	•	•	9th	•	•	•	•	•	•	•	•	•	•	•	•	•	•	•	•	•	•	TBD	1
Vietnam	•	•	•	•	•	•	•	•	•	•	•	•	•	•	•	•	•	•	•	31st	•	TBD	1
West Germany	•	16th	10th	13th	•	•	19th	18th	14th	13th	13th	Part of Germany											8
Yugoslavia	•	•	•	•	•	•	•	16th	•	•	•	Does not exist											1

Legend
1st	Champions
2nd	Runners-up
3rd	3rd place
4th	4th place
Q	Qualified for upcoming tournament
TBD	To be determined (may still qualify for upcoming tournament)
••	Qualified but withdrew
•	Did not qualify
×	Withdrew before qualification / Banned or disqualified by the FIVB
	Hosts
	Did not enter
—N/a	Not a FIVB member

== All-time performance ==
#	Team	Titles	Runners-up	Third place	Fourth place	Total
1	Soviet Union	5 (1952, 1956, 1960, 1970, 1990)	2 (1962, 1974)	1 (1978)	–	8
2	Japan	3 (1962, 1967, 1974)	3 (1960, 1970, 1978)	1 (2010)	2 (1982, 2025)	9
3	Cuba	3 (1978, 1994, 1998)	1 (1986)	–	1 (1990)	5
4	China	2 (1982, 1986)	3 (1990, 1998, 2014)	1 (2018)	1 (2002)	7
5	Italy	2 (2002, 2025)	1 (2018)	1 (2022)	2 (2006, 2014)	6
6	Russia	2 (2006, 2010)	–	3 (1994, 1998, 2002)	–	5
7	Serbia	2 (2018, 2022)	–	–	–	2
8	United States	1 (2014)	2 (1967, 2002)	2 (1982, 1990)	2 (2010, 2022)	7
9	Brazil	–	4 (1994, 2006, 2010, 2022)	2 (2014, 2025)	1 (1998)	7
10	Poland	–	1 (1952)	2 (1956, 1962)	1 (1960)	4
11	Peru	–	1 (1982)	1 (1986)	1 (1967)	3
12	Romania	–	1 (1956)	–	1 (1962)	2
13	Turkey	–	1 (2025)	–	–	1
14	South Korea	–	–	2 (1967, 1974)	2 (1978, 1994)	4
15	Czechoslovakia	–	–	2 (1952, 1960)	1 (1956)	3
16	North Korea	–	–	1 (1970)	–	1
16	Serbia and Montenegro	–	–	1 (2006)	–	1
18	East Germany	–	–	–	2 (1974, 1986)	2
19	Bulgaria	–	–	–	1 (1952)	1
19	Hungary	–	–	–	1 (1970)	1
19	Netherlands	–	–	–	1 (2018)	1

== Hosts ==
Results of host nations
Year	Host nation	Finish
1952	Soviet Union	Champions
1956	France	12th place
1960	Brazil	5th place
1962	Soviet Union	Runners-up
1967	Japan	Champions
1970	Bulgaria	6th place
1974	Mexico	10th place
1978	Soviet Union	Third place
1982	Peru	Runners-up
1986	Czechoslovakia	11th place
1990	China	Runners-up
1994	Brazil	Runners-up
1998	Japan	8th place
2002	Germany	10th place
2006	Japan	6th place
2010	Japan	Third place
2014	Italy	Fourth place
2018	Japan	6th place
2022	Netherlands	12th place
2022	Poland	7th place
2025	Thailand	13th place
2027	United States	Future event
2027	Canada	Future event
2029	Philippines	Future event

== See also ==
- National team appearances in the FIVB Men's Volleyball World Cup
- List of FIVB Women's Volleyball World Championship finals
