= National team appearances in the FIVB Men's Volleyball World Cup =

This article gives the detailed results of each FIVB Men's Volleyball World Cup.

== Debut of national teams ==
A total of 69 national teams have participated in at least one tournament (until the 2027 tournament).

Year	Debutants	Total
1949	Belgium, Bulgaria, Czechoslovakia, France, Hungary, Italy, Netherlands, Poland, Romania, Soviet Union	10
1952	Finland, India, Israel, Lebanon	4
1956	Austria, Brazil, China, Cuba, East Germany, Luxembourg, Portugal, South Korea, Turkey, United States, West Germany, Yugoslavia	12
1960	Argentina, Japan, Paraguay, Peru, Uruguay, Venezuela	6
1962	Albania, Mongolia, North Korea	3
1966	Denmark	1
1970	Guinea, Iran, Tunisia	3
1974	Canada, Dominican Republic, Egypt, Mexico, Panama, Puerto Rico	6
1978	None	0
1982	Australia, Chile, Iraq, Libya	4
1986	Chinese Taipei, Greece	2
1990	Cameroon, Sweden	2
1994	Algeria, Germany, Russia	3
1998	Czech Republic, Serbia and Montenegro, Spain, Thailand, Ukraine	5
2002	Croatia, Kazakhstan	2
2006	None	0
2010	Serbia	1
2014	None	0
2018	Slovenia	1
2022	Qatar	1
2025	Colombia, Philippines	2
2027	Estonia	1
2029		
Total		69

== Comprehensive team results ==
Edition Host(s) (No. of teams) Team	1949 (Czechoslovakia) (10)	1952 (Soviet Union) (11)	1956 (France) (24)	1960 (Brazil) (14)	1962 (Soviet Union) (21)	1966 (Czechoslovakia) (22)	1970 (Bulgaria) (24)	1974 (Mexico) (24)	1978 (Italy) (24)	1982 (Argentina) (24)	1986 (France) (16)	1990 (Brazil) (16)	1994 (Greece) (16)	1998 (Japan) (24)	2002 (Argentina) (24)	2006 (Japan) (24)	2010 (Italy) (24)	2014 (Poland) (24)	2018 (Italy) (Bulgaria) (24)	2022 (Poland) (Slovenia) (24)	2025 (Philippines) (32)	2027 (Poland) (32)	2029 (Qatar) (32)	Total
Albania	•	•	•	•	16th	•	•	•	•	•	•	•	•	•	•	•	•	•	•	•	•	•	TBD	1
Algeria	Part of France				•	•	•	•	•	•	•	•	13th	19th	•	•	•	•	•	•	32nd	Q	TBD	4
Argentina	•	•	•	11th	•	•	•	•	22nd	3rd	7th	6th	14th	11th	6th	13th	9th	11th	15th	8th	9th	Q	TBD	15
Australia	•	•	•	•	•	•	•	•	•	22nd	•	•	•	17th	19th	21st	19th	15th	14th	•	•	•	TBD	7
Austria	•	•	20th	•	19th	•	•	•	•	•	•	•	•	•	•	•	•	•	•	•	•	•	TBD	2
Belgium	9th	•	17th	•	20th	14th	8th	11th	18th	•	•	•	•	•	•	•	•	17th	10th	•	7th	Q	TBD	11
Brazil	•	•	11th	5th	10th	13th	12th	9th	6th	2nd	4th	4th	5th	4th	1st	1st	1st	2nd	2nd	3rd	17th	Q	TBD	20
Bulgaria	3rd	3rd	5th	•	4th	7th	2nd	7th	10th	5th	3rd	5th	9th	7th	13th	3rd	7th	13th	11th	20th	2nd	Q	TBD	21
Cameroon	•	•	•	•	•	•	•	•	•	•	•	15th	•	•	•	•	13th	21st	19th	23rd	•	Q	TBD	6
Canada	•	•	•	•	•	•	•	20th	20th	11th	•	12th	9th	12th	17th	11th	19th	7th	9th	17th	14th	Q	TBD	14
Chile	•	•	•	•	•	•	•	•	•	23rd	•	•	•	•	•	•	•	•	•	•	31st	Q	TBD	3
China	•	•	9th	•	9th	9th	•	15th	7th	7th	12th	•	15th	15th	13th	17th	19th	15th	22nd	24th	30th	•	TBD	16
Chinese Taipei	•	•	•	•	•	•	•	• (Note: People's Republic of China replaced Republic of China (Asian Qualification Runners-up) after FIVB recognised China as a legitimate Chinese state.)	•	•	15th	•	•	•	•	•	•	•	•	•	•	•	TBD	1
Colombia	•	•	•	•	•	•	•	•	•	•	•	•	•	•	•	•	•	•	•	•	26th	•	TBD	1
Croatia	Part of Yugoslavia												•	•	19th	•	•	•	•	•	•	•	TBD	1
Cuba	•	•	19th	•	•	17th	13th	8th	3rd	10th	5th	2nd	4th	3rd	19th	15th	2nd	11th	18th	14th	20th	Q	TBD	18
Czech Republic	Part of Czechoslovakia												•	19th	13th	13th	10th	•	•	•	4th	Q	TBD	6
Czechoslovakia	2nd	2nd	1st	2nd	2nd	1st	4th	5th	5th	9th	8th	9th	Does not exist											12
Denmark	•	•	•	•	•	22nd	•	•	•	•	•	•	•	•	•	•	•	•	•	•	•	Q	TBD	2
Dominican Republic	•	•	•	••	•	•	•	22nd	•	•	•	•	•	•	•	•	•	•	24th	•	•	•	TBD	2
East Germany	•	•	12th	•	11th	4th	1st	4th	9th	12th	•	•	See Germany											7
Egypt	•	•	•	•	•	•	•	17th	23rd	•	14th	•	•	19th	19th	21st	13th	21st	20th	19th	25th	Q	TBD	12
Estonia	•	•	•	•	•	•	•	•	•	•	•	•	•	•	•	•	•	•	•	•	•	Q	TBD	1
Finland	•	11th	•	•	18th	19th	20th	•	17th	17th	•	•	•	•	•	•	•	9th	16th	•	15th	Q	TBD	10
France	6th	6th	7th	9th	•	18th	17th	16th	15th	16th	6th	8th	•	•	3rd	6th	11th	4th	7th	5th	18th	Q	TBD	19
Germany	See East Germany and West Germany												9th	•	•	9th	8th	3rd	•	15th	21st	Q	TBD	7
Greece	•	•	•	•	•	•	•	•	•	•	13th	•	6th	13th	7th	17th	•	•	•	•	•	Q	TBD	6
Guinea	•	•	•	•	•	•	24th	•	•	•	•	•	•	•	•	•	•	•	•	•	•	•	TBD	1
Hungary	7th	5th	8th	6th	7th	10th	11th	•	14th	•	•	•	•	•	•	•	•	•	•	•	•	•	TBD	8
India	•	8th	21st	••	••	•	••	•	•	••	•	•	•	•	•	•	•	•	×	•	•	•	TBD	2
Iran	•	•	•	•	•	•	21st	•	•	•	•	•	•	19th	•	21st	19th	6th	13th	13th	8th	Q	TBD	9
Iraq	•	•	•	•	•	•	•	•	•	20th	•	•	•	•	•	•	•	•	•	•	•	•	TBD	1
Israel	•	10th	16th	•	15th	•	19th	•	•	•	•	•	•	•	•	•	•	•	•	•	•	•	TBD	4
Italy	8th	•	14th	•	14th	16th	15th	19th	2nd	14th	11th	1st	1st	1st	5th	5th	4th	13th	5th	1st	1st	Q	TBD	20
Japan	•	•	•	8th	5th	5th	3rd	3rd	11th	4th	10th	11th	9th	15th	9th	8th	13th	•	17th	12th	23rd	Q	TBD	18
Kazakhstan	Part of Soviet Union												•	•	19th	21st	•	•	•	•	•	•	TBD	2
Lebanon	•	9th	•	•	•	•	•	•	•	•	•	•	•	•	•	•	•	•	•	•	•	•	TBD	1
Libya	•	•	•	•	•	•	•	•	•	24th	•	•	•	•	•	•	•	•	•	•	28th	•	TBD	2
Luxembourg	•	•	23rd	•	•	•	•	•	•	•	•	•	•	•	•	•	•	•	•	•	•	•	TBD	1
Mexico	•	•	•	••	•	•	•	10th	12th	18th	•	•	•	•	•	•	13th	17th	•	18th	•	Q	TBD	7
Mongolia	•	•	•	•	17th	21st	16th (Note: Mongolia replaced South Korea (1966 Asian Games Runners-up) because of South Korea did not play due to political problems with Bulgaria.)	•	•	•	•	•	•	•	•	•	•	•	•	•	•	•	TBD	3
Netherlands	10th	•	13th	•	12th	12th	14th	12th	16th	•	•	7th	2nd	6th	9th	•	•	•	8th	10th	13th	Q	TBD	15
North Korea	•	•	•	•	13th	••	9th	•	•	•	•	•	•	•	•	•	•	•	•	•	•	•	TBD	2
Panama	•	•	•	•	•	•	•	24th	•	•	•	•	•	•	•	•	•	•	•	•	•	•	TBD	1
Paraguay	•	•	•	12th	•	•	•	•	•	•	•	•	•	•	•	•	•	•	•	•	•	•	TBD	1
Peru	•	•	•	14th	•	•	•	•	•	•	•	•	•	•	•	•	•	•	•	•	•	•	TBD	1
Philippines	•	•	•	•	•	•	•	•	•	•	•	•	•	•	•	•	•	•	•	•	19th	•	TBD	1
Poland	5th	7th	4th	4th	6th	6th	5th	1st	8th	6th	9th	•	•	17th	9th	2nd	13th	1st	1st	2nd	3rd	Q	TBD	20
Portugal	•	•	15th	•	•	•	•	•	•	•	•	•	•	•	8th	•	•	•	•	•	16th	•	TBD	3
Puerto Rico	•	•	•	•	•	•	•	23rd	•	•	•	•	•	•	•	12th	13th	21st	21st	22nd	•	Q	TBD	7
Qatar	•	•	•	•	•	•	•	•	•	•	•	•	•	•	•	•	•	•	•	21st	22nd	•	Q	3
Romania	4th	4th	2nd	3rd	3rd	2nd	7th	6th	13th	15th	•	•	•	•	•	•	•	•	•	•	29th	Q	TBD	12
Russia	Part of Soviet Union												7th	5th	2nd	7th	5th	5th	6th	×	×		TBD	7
Serbia	Part of Yugoslavia												Part of Serbia and Montenegro				3rd	9th	4th	9th	10th	Q	TBD	6
Serbia and Montenegro	Part of Yugoslavia												•	2nd	4th	4th	Does not exist							3
Slovenia	Part of Yugoslavia												•	•	•	•	•	•	12th	4th	11th	Q	TBD	4
South Korea	•	•	18th	•	•	•	•	13th	4th	8th	•	14th	8th	13th	••	17th	•	17th	•	•	27th	Q	TBD	11
Soviet Union	1st	1st	3rd	1st	1st	3rd	6th	2nd	1st	1st	2nd	3rd	Does not exist											12
Spain	•	•	•	•	•	•	•	•	•	•	•	•	•	8th	13th	•	12th	•	•	•	•	•	TBD	3
Sweden	•	•	•	•	•	•	•	•	•	•	•	10th	16th	•	•	•	•	•	•	•	•	•	TBD	2
Thailand	•	•	•	•	•	•	•	•	•	•	•	•	•	19th	•	•	•	•	•	•	•	•	TBD	1
Tunisia	•	•	•	•	×	•	22nd	18th	24th	21st	•	•	•	•	19th	15th	19th	21st	23rd	16th	12th	Q	TBD	12
Turkey	•	•	22nd	•	••	15th	•	•	•	•	•	•	•	19th	•	•	•	•	•	11th	6th	Q	TBD	6
Ukraine	Part of Soviet Union												•	10th	•	•	•	•	•	7th	24th	Q	TBD	4
United States	•	•	6th	7th	•	11th	18th	14th	19th	13th	1st	13th	3rd	9th	9th	10th	6th	7th	3rd	6th	5th	Q	TBD	19
Uruguay	••	•	•	13th	•	•	•	•	•	•	•	•	•	•	•	•	•	•	•	•	•	•	TBD	1
Venezuela	•	•	•	10th	•	•	23rd	21st	21st	19th	16th	16th	•	•	17th	17th	19th	17th	•	•	•	•	TBD	11
West Germany	•	•	24th	•	•	20th	•	•	•	•	•	•	See Germany											2
Yugoslavia	••	•	10th	•	8th	8th	10th	•	•	•	•	•	Does not exist											4

Legend
1st	Champions
2nd	Runners-up
3rd	3rd place
4th	4th place
Q	Qualified for upcoming tournament
TBD	To be determined (may still qualify for upcoming tournament)
••	Qualified but withdrew
•	Did not qualify
×	Withdrew before qualification / Banned or disqualified by the FIVB
	Hosts
	Did not enter
—N/a	Not a FIVB member

== All-time performance ==
#	Team	Titles	Runners-up	Third place	Fourth place	Total
1	Soviet Union	6 (1949, 1952, 1960, 1962, 1978, 1982)	2 (1974, 1986)	3 (1956, 1966, 1990)	–	11
2	Italy	5 (1990, 1994, 1998, 2022, 2025)	1 (1978)	–	1 (2010)	7
3	Brazil	3 (2002, 2006, 2010)	3 (1982, 2014, 2018)	1 (2022)	3 (1986, 1990, 1998)	10
4	Poland	3 (1974, 2014, 2018)	2 (2006, 2022)	1 (2025)	2 (1956, 1960)	8
5	Czechoslovakia	2 (1956, 1966)	4 (1949, 1952, 1960, 1962)	–	1 (1970)	7
6	United States	1 (1986)	–	2 (1994, 2018)	–	3
7	East Germany	1 (1970)	–	–	2 (1966, 1974)	3
8	Bulgaria	–	2 (1970, 2025)	4 (1949, 1952, 1986, 2006)	1 (1962)	7
9	Romania	–	2 (1956, 1966)	2 (1960, 1962)	2 (1949, 1952)	6
10	Cuba	–	2 (1990, 2010)	2 (1978, 1998)	1 (1994)	5
11	FR Yugoslavia / Serbia and Montenegro	–	1 (1998)	–	2 (2002, 2006)	3
12	Netherlands	–	1 (1994)	–	–	1
12	Russia	–	1 (2002)	–	–	1
14	Japan	–	–	2 (1970, 1974)	1 (1982)	3
15	France	–	–	1 (2002)	1 (2014)	2
15	Serbia	–	–	1 (2010)	1 (2018)	2
17	Argentina	–	–	1 (1982)	–	1
17	Germany	–	–	1 (2014)	–	1
19	Czech Republic	–	–	–	1 (2025)	1
19	Slovenia	–	–	–	1 (2022)	1
19	South Korea	–	–	–	1 (1978)	1

== Hosts ==
Results of host nations
Year	Host nation	Finish
1949	Czechoslovakia	Runners-up
1952	Soviet Union	Champions
1956	France	7th place
1960	Brazil	5th place
1962	Soviet Union	Champions
1966	Czechoslovakia	Champions
1970	Bulgaria	Runners-up
1974	Mexico	10th place
1978	Italy	Runners-up
1982	Argentina	Third place
1986	France	6th place
1990	Brazil	Fourth place
1994	Greece	6th place
1998	Japan	15th place
2002	Argentina	6th place
2006	Japan	8th place
2010	Italy	Fourth place
2014	Poland	Champions
2018	Italy	5th place
2018	Bulgaria	11th place
2022	Poland	Runners-up
2022	Slovenia	Fourth place
2025	Philippines	19th place
2027	Poland	Future event
2029	Qatar	Future event

== Active consecutive participations ==
This is a list of active consecutive participations of national teams in the FIVB Men's World Championship.

As of 18 October 2026

Team	Managed to qualify since	Consecutive participations
Brazil	1956	20
Bulgaria	1962	18
Italy	1962	18
Cuba	1966	17
United States	1966	17
Argentina	1978	14
Canada	1990	11
Egypt	1998	9
Poland	1998	9
Serbia	1998	9 (Note: Serbia between 1998–2006 competed as Serbia and Montenegro.)
France	2002	8
Tunisia	2002	8
Iran	2006	7
Japan	2018	4
Netherlands	2018	4
Slovenia	2018	4
Germany	2022	3
Turkey	2022	3
Ukraine	2022	3
Algeria	2025	2
Belgium	2025	2
Chile	2025	2
Czech Republic	2025	2
Finland	2025	2
Romania	2025	2
South Korea	2025	2

== See also ==
- National team appearances in the FIVB Women's Volleyball World Cup
- List of FIVB Men's Volleyball World Championship finals
