= 1952 FIVB Men's Volleyball World Championship =

FIVB World Championship
Tournament details
- Host country: Soviet Union
- Dates: 17–29 August
- Teams: 11
- Venue: 1 (in 1 host city)
- Officially opened by: Joseph Stalin

Final positions
- Champions: Soviet Union (2nd title)

| year = 1952

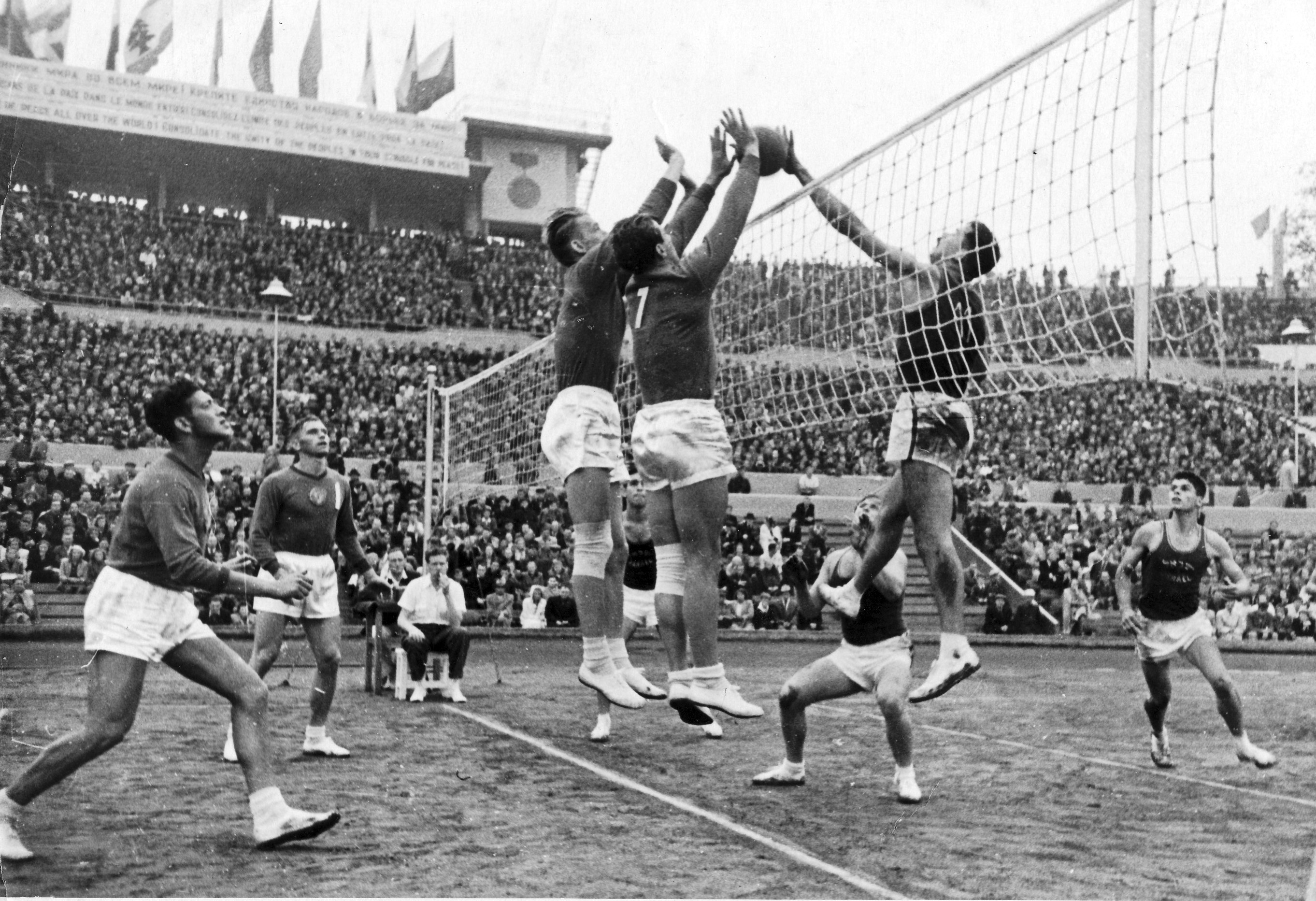
Israel vs. Soviet Union, 1952 FIVB Men's World Championship

The 1952 FIVB Men's World Championship was the second edition of the tournament, organised by the world's governing body, the FIVB. It was held from 17 to 29 August 1952 in Moscow, Soviet Union.

== Teams ==
Pool A

- Bulgaria
- Finland
- Hungary
- Poland

Pool B

- Romania
- Israel
- Lebanon
- Soviet Union (Host)

Pool C

- Czechoslovakia
- France
- India

== Results ==
=== First round ===
==== Pool A ====
Pos	Team	Pld	W	L	Pts	SW	SL	SR	SPW	SPL	SPR	Qualification
1	Hungary	3	3	0	6	9	3	3.000	163	113	1.442	1st–6th place
2	Bulgaria	3	2	1	5	7	3	2.333	142	82	1.732	1st–6th place
3	Poland	3	1	2	4	5	6	0.833	123	127	0.969	7th–11th place
4	Finland	3	0	3	3	0	9	0.000	29	135	0.215	7th–11th place

Date		Score		Set 1	Set 2	Set 3	Set 4	Set 5	Total
17 Aug	Hungary	3–1	Bulgaria	15–13	16–14	9–15	15–10		55–52
17 Aug	Poland	3–0	Finland	15–8	15–5	15–6			45–19
19 Aug	Hungary	3–2	Poland	8–15	10–15	15–9	15–10	15–7	63–56
19 Aug	Bulgaria	3–0	Finland	15–2	15–0	15–3			45–5
20 Aug	Hungary	3–0	Finland	15–1	15–1	15–3			45–5
20 Aug	Bulgaria	3–0	Poland	15–7	15–5	15–10			45–22

==== Pool B ====
Pos	Team	Pld	W	L	Pts	SW	SL	SR	SPW	SPL	SPR	Qualification
1	Soviet Union	3	3	0	6	9	0	MAX	135	35	3.857	1st–6th place
2	Romania	3	2	1	5	6	3	2.000	110	79	1.392	1st–6th place
3	Israel	3	1	2	4	3	6	0.500	75	116	0.647	7th–11th place
4	Lebanon	3	0	3	3	0	9	0.000	46	136	0.338	7th–11th place

Date		Score		Set 1	Set 2	Set 3	Set 4	Set 5	Total
17 Aug	Romania	3–0	Lebanon	15–9	15–1	15–2			45–12
17 Aug	Soviet Union	3–0	Israel	15–2	15–4	15–1			45–7
19 Aug	Israel	3–0	Lebanon	15–6	16–14	15–6			46–26
19 Aug	Soviet Union	3–0	Romania	15–10	15–2	15–8			45–20
20 Aug	Romania	3–0	Israel	15–10	15–7	15–5			45–22
20 Aug	Soviet Union	3–0	Lebanon	15–1	15–1	15–6			45–8

==== Pool C ====
Pos	Team	Pld	W	L	Pts	SW	SL	SR	SPW	SPL	SPR	Qualification
1	Czechoslovakia	2	2	0	4	6	0	MAX	90	30	3.000	1st–6th place
2	France	2	1	1	3	3	3	1.000	54	64	0.844	1st–6th place
3	India	2	0	2	2	0	6	0.000	40	90	0.444	7th–11th place

Date		Score		Set 1	Set 2	Set 3	Set 4	Set 5	Total
18 Aug	Czechoslovakia	3–0	France	15–4	15–2	15–3			45–9
19 Aug	France	3–0	India	15–9	15–3	15–7			45–19
20 Aug	Czechoslovakia	3–0	India	15–10	15–3	15–8			45–21

=== Final round ===
==== 7th–11th places ====
Pos	Team	Pld	W	L	Pts	SW	SL	SR	SPW	SPL	SPR
7	Poland	4	4	0	8	12	0	MAX	181	50	3.620
8	India	4	3	1	7	9	3	3.000	168	103	1.631
9	Lebanon	4	2	2	6	6	9	0.667	167	186	0.898
10	Israel	4	1	3	5	5	9	0.556	138	183	0.754
11	Finland	4	0	4	4	1	12	0.083	58	190	0.305

Date		Score		Set 1	Set 2	Set 3	Set 4	Set 5	Total
22 Aug	Lebanon	3–2	Israel	15–17	12–15	15–9	16–14	16–14	74–69
22 Aug	Poland	3–0	India	15–12	15–7	16–14			46–33
23 Aug	India	3–0	Finland	15–4	15–1	15–4			45–9
23 Aug	Poland	3–0	Israel	15–1	15–4	15–1			45–6
24 Aug	India	3–0	Lebanon	15–7	15–11	15–12			45–30
24 Aug	Poland	3–0	Finland	15–0	15–1	15–2			45–3
25 Aug	India	3–0	Israel	15–6	15–3	15–9			45–18
25 Aug	Lebanon	3–1	Finland	15–5	15–4	10–15	15–3		55–27
26 Aug	Israel	3–0	Finland	15–10	15–8	15–1			45–19
26 Aug	Poland	3–0	Lebanon	15–2	15–4	15–2			45–8

==== Final places ====
Pos	Team	Pld	W	L	Pts	SW	SL	SR	SPW	SPL	SPR
1	Soviet Union	5	5	0	10	15	0	MAX	225	114	1.974
2	Czechoslovakia	5	4	1	9	12	7	1.714	253	194	1.304
3	Bulgaria	5	3	2	8	11	9	1.222	265	255	1.039
4	Romania	5	2	3	7	7	12	0.583	209	262	0.798
5	Hungary	5	1	4	6	7	12	0.583	218	264	0.826
6	France	5	0	5	5	3	15	0.200	180	261	0.690

Date		Score		Set 1	Set 2	Set 3	Set 4	Set 5	Total
22 Aug	Czechoslovakia	3–0	France	15–10	15–6	15–6			45–22
22 Aug	Soviet Union	3–0	Hungary	15–3	15–3	15–12			45–18
23 Aug	Bulgaria	3–1	Romania	16–14	12–15	16–14	15–9		59–52
23 Aug	Czechoslovakia	3–2	Hungary	15–13	11–15	13–15	15–9	15–5	69–57
24 Aug	Bulgaria	3–1	France	15–11	15–11	10–15	15–4		55–41
24 Aug	Soviet Union	3–0	Romania	15–5	15–6	15–10			45–21
25 Aug	Soviet Union	3–0	Bulgaria	15–11	15–10	15–5			45–26
26 Aug	Czechoslovakia	3–0	Romania	15–3	15–4	15–3			45–10
26 Aug	Hungary	3–0	France	15–6	16–14	15–9			46–29
27 Aug	Romania	3–1	Hungary	15–11	11–15	15–11	15–13		56–50
27 Aug	Soviet Union	3–0	France	15–6	15–11	15–8			45–25
27 Aug	Czechoslovakia	3–2	Bulgaria	12–15	13–15	15–13	15–13	15–4	70–60
28 Aug	Romania	3–2	France	15–12	15–11	14–16	11–15	15–9	70–63
29 Aug	Bulgaria	3–1	Hungary	15–8	20–22	15–13	15–4		65–47
29 Aug	Soviet Union	3–0	Czechoslovakia	15–11	15–7	15–6			45–24

== Final standing ==
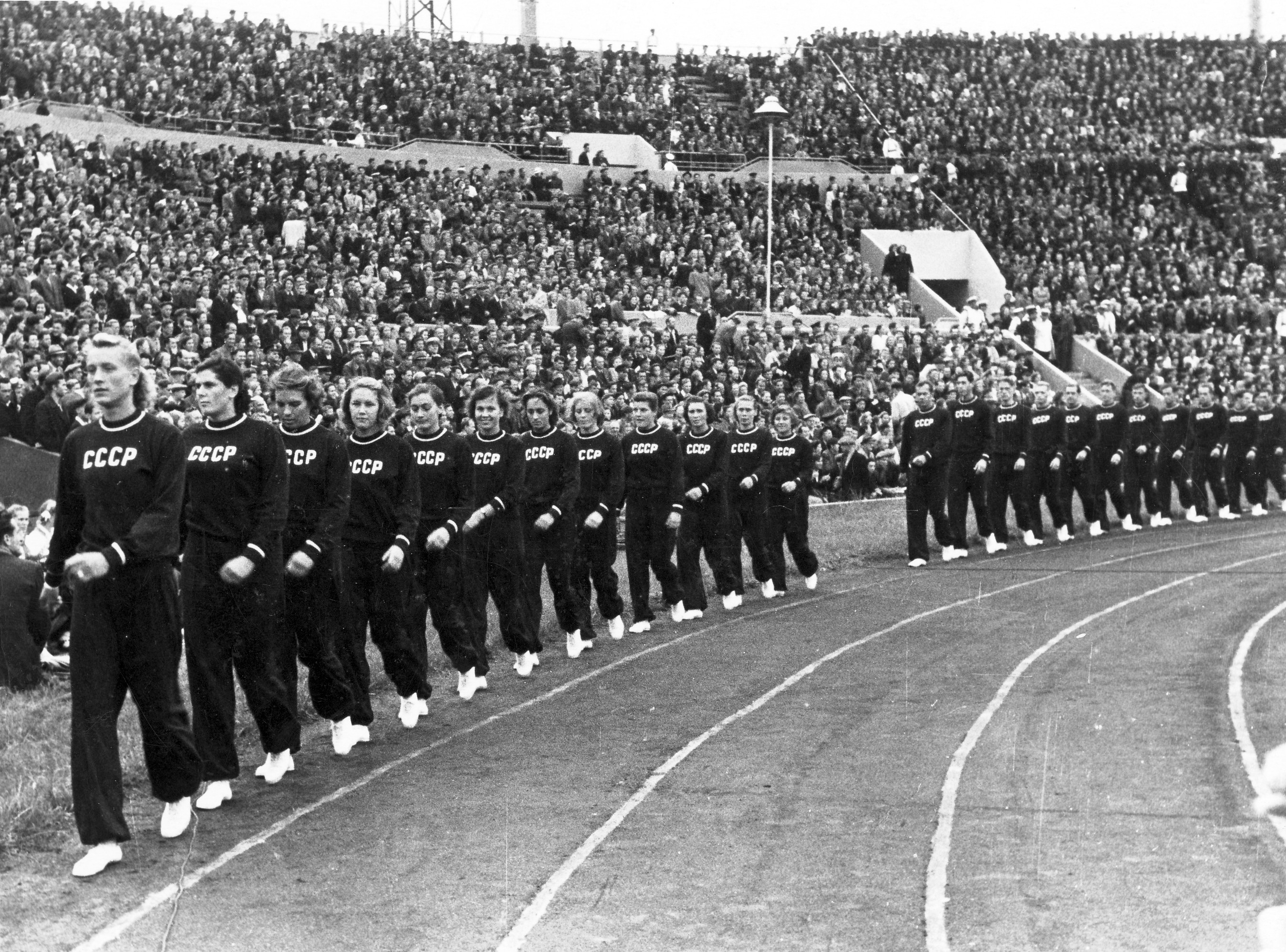
Soviet women's and men's national volleyball teams in 1952 FIVB World Championship

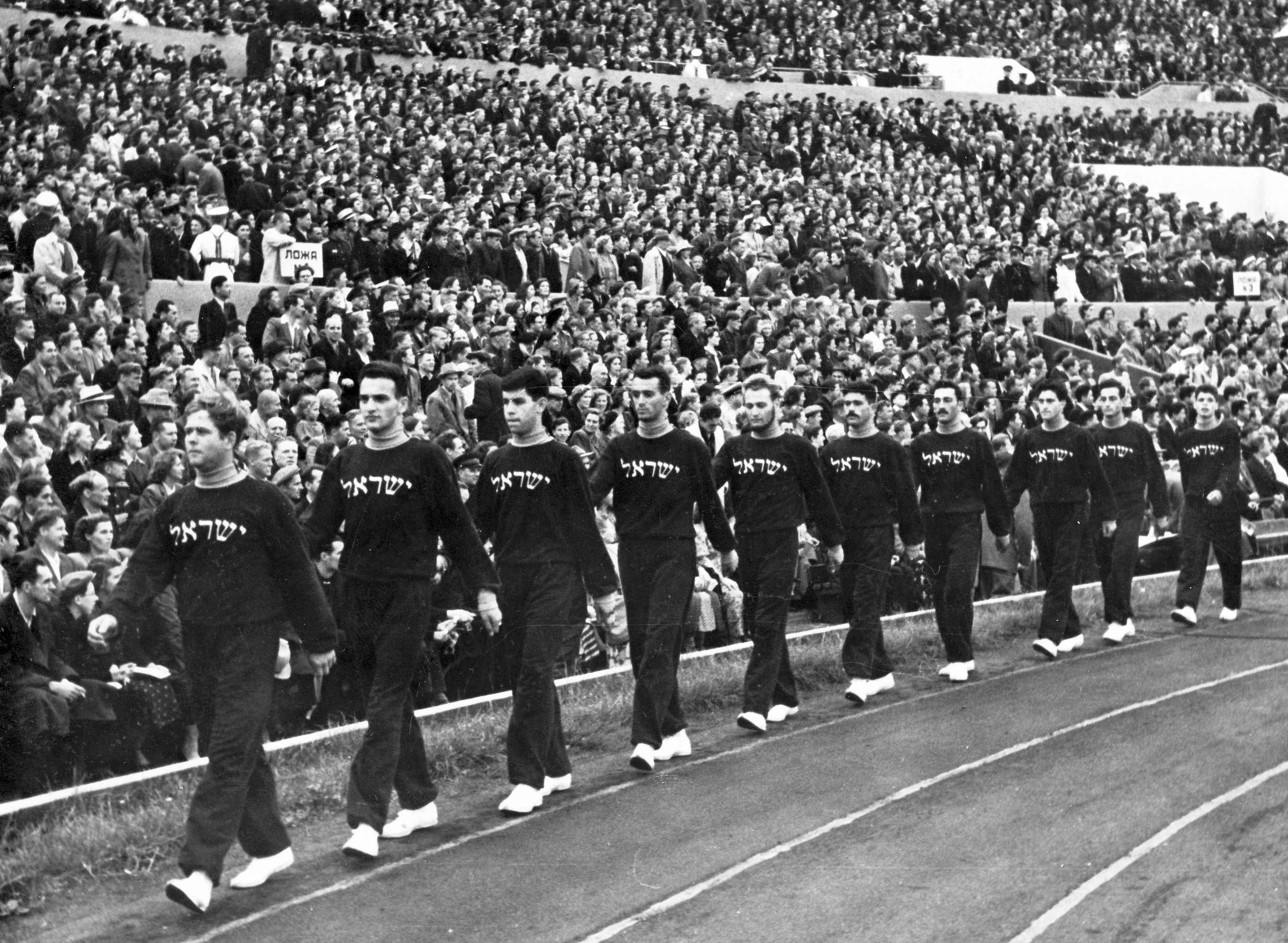
Israel men's national volleyball team in 1952 FIVB World Championship

Rank	Team
1st place, gold medalist(s)	Soviet Union
2nd place, silver medalist(s)	Czechoslovakia
3rd place, bronze medalist(s)	Bulgaria
4	Romania
5	Hungary
6	France
7	Poland
8	India
9	Lebanon
10	Israel
11	Finland

1952 Men's World champions

Soviet Union
2nd title
