= FIVB Volleyball World Championship Trophy =

- Awarded for: Winning the FIVB Men's Volleyball World Championship and the FIVB Women's Volleyball World Championship
- Presented by: Fédération Internationale de Volleyball

History
- First award: 2014 (Men's trophy); 2014 (Women's trophy)
- First winner: Poland (Men's trophy, 2014); United States (Women's trophy, 2014)
- Most wins: Poland (Men's trophy, 2 times); Serbia (Women's trophy, 2 times)
- Most recent: Italy (Men's trophy, 1st title); Italy (Women's trophy, 1st title)
- Website: fivb.com

The FIVB Volleyball World Championship Trophy, a distinctive half nickel and half gold design, is awarded to the winners of both the FIVB Men's Volleyball World Championship and the FIVB Women's Volleyball World Championship, since 2014. Prior to that, the trophy varied each year and was given to the championship team without rotating usage.

The new trophy was designed by Swiss designers Thilo Alex Brunner and Jörg Mettler of BMCO, and was first awarded to the Poland men's national team and the United States women's national team in 2014.

== Design ==
The trophy stands 42.88 centimeters (16.88 inches) tall and weighs 9 kilograms (19.84 pounds). Its design features 12 individual components, each representing the 12 players on a team.

== Theft of the Trophy ==
During the trophy tour, which was displayed at Copacabana Beach in Rio de Janeiro, Brazil, in 2014, both the men's and women's FIVB World Championship trophies were stolen from a van parked near the Brazilian Volleyball Confederation office while being transported back to the FIVB headquarters in Lausanne. As a result, the FIVB had to create new trophies to ensure they were available for the competition.

== Winners ==
As of September 2025, the names of two winners for the men's trophy and three winners for the women's trophy have been engraved on the base.

Men's trophy

- Poland – 2014, 2018
- Italy – 2022

Women's trophy

- United States – 2014
- Serbia – 2018, 2022
- Italy – 2025
