= 2025 FIVB Women's Volleyball World Championship =

Event in Bangkok, Thailand

เอฟไอวีบีวอลเลย์บอลหญิงชิงแชมป์โลก 2025

Tournament details
- Host country: Thailand
- Cities: Bangkok; Nakhon Ratchasima; Chiang Mai; Phuket
- Dates: 22 August – 7 September
- Teams: 32 (from 5 confederations)
- Venues: 4 (in 4 host cities)

Final positions
- Champions: Italy (2nd title)
- Runners-up: Turkey
- Third place: Brazil
- Fourth place: Japan

Tournament awards
- MVP: (Italy) Alessia Orro
- Best Setter: (Italy) Alessia Orro
- Best OH: (Brazil) Gabriela Guimarães; (Japan) Mayu Ishikawa
- Best MB: (Turkey) Eda Erdem; (Italy) Anna Danesi
- Best OPP: (Turkey) Melissa Vargas
- Best Libero: (Italy) Monica De Gennaro

Tournament statistics
- Matches played: 64
- Attendance: 188,167 (2,940 per match)

The 2025 FIVB Women's Volleyball World Championship was the 20th staging of the FIVB Women's Volleyball World Championship for women's national volleyball teams, organized by the Fédération Internationale de Volleyball (FIVB). It was held in four cities of Thailand from 22 August to 7 September 2025, and the first edition under the two-year cycles in odd-numbered years with an expanded format featuring 32 teams.

The tournament was the first World Championship to be hosted in Southeast Asia, and the first of two consecutive World Championships in 2025 held in this region, preceding the Men's World Championship in the Philippines. Thailand became the third country in Asia to host the World Championship, following Japan and China. The competition was also the first world senior championship in Olympic team sports to be hosted in Thailand.

Serbia were the defending champions. Italy won its second title after defeating Turkey in the final. This was Turkey's first medal. Brazil claimed bronze against Japan in the third place match. Alessia Orro of Italy was named the MVP of the tournament.

== Background ==
Previously, the competition format was determined through agreements between the host country and the FIVB, resulting in varying and inconsistent formats. In March 2022, the FIVB Board of Administration approved the new proposed World Championship format. To standardize, the proposed format started with a pool phase and then proceeded with a direct elimination phase. Additionally, they proposed increasing the number of teams from 24 to 32 to guarantee universality. The new format of the World Championship was confirmed in late 2022 and started with this edition.

In May 2022, the FIVB revealed the television rights agreement for Polsat covering the competition events from 2022 to 2032, which included a new event to be held in 2025 and 2029. Before that, Fabio Azevedo, now the FIVB president and a member of the Board of Administration, suggested that the World Championships be held in 2027 and subsequently every two years, while the Continental Championships would take place in 2026 and 2028, serving as qualifiers for the World Championships. However, the proposed timeline was moved up after the FIVB announced the competition calendar for 2025 to 2028 in June 2023, shifting the World Championships to 2025 and using the 2023 Continental Championships as qualifiers for that event.

== Host selection ==
The bidding procedure to host the 2025 and 2027 FIVB World Championships began in August 2023. National federations had until 31 August 2023 to register interest. At least five countries placed rival bids for the 2025 FIVB Women's World Championships: Hong Kong SAR, Indonesia, the Philippines, Thailand, and Vietnam. As Indonesia, the Philippines, Thailand, and Vietnam have been the largest and fastest-growing markets for volleyball, and some of these countries didn't have enough potential to host the expanded World Championship alone, the FIVB viewed co-hosting among four countries as the best option to share related risks and benefits, strengthen cordial ties among the co-host countries, and promote the sport in Southeast Asia.

Initially, the announcement of the host country was scheduled to be held in March 2024, but was postponed by withdrawals, confusing bidding conditions, and political uncertainty. The Philippines withdrew its bid in March 2024, due to the aforementioned confusing bidding conditions, and its selection as the sole host of the 2025 FIVB Volleyball Men's World Championship. Vietnam later withdrew its bid, citing financial reasons. Meanwhile, even though Thailand did not consider withdrawing its bid, it was still slowed down due to complex administrative procedures, with the high budget for the tournament requiring joint consideration with the Sports Authority of Thailand (SAT), the National Sports Development Fund (NSDF), and the Ministry of Tourism and Sports (MOTS). After successfully hosting the final round of the 2024 FIVB Women's Volleyball Nations League, the FIVB preferred Thailand to be the host of the World Championship. Eventually, the FIVB and the Volleyball World announced that Thailand was selected as the sole host of the tournament at the Asian Volleyball Confederation (AVC) Elective General Assembly on 30 August 2024 in Bangkok, Thailand. Following the announcement of the host country, the host agreement was signed by, then-president of the FIVB, Ary Graça and the president of the Thailand Volleyball Association (TVA) Somporn Chaibangyang. The selection was subject to the guarantee of the Government of Thailand, which was renewed due to the dismissal of Thai Prime Minister Srettha Thavisin by the Constitutional Court on 14 August 2024. The new government was established on 6 September 2024; however, by November 2024, its guarantee had yet to be ratified. After a long time, the government guaranteed its subsidies to the World Championship on 3 December 2024 and formally informed the FIVB by 6 December 2024.

== Qualification ==
The qualification criteria and slot allocation of the expanded World Championship were approved by the FIVB Board of Administration. Similar to the 2022 World Championship, the number of places in the finals allocated to each of the continental zones was not based on the numbers participating in the qualification round and relative performance of the confederations' teams from the previous edition (for example, NORCECA had the second most slots in 2018 with six due to a large number of teams in the continental qualifiers (34) and the high performance of their teams in 2014). Every confederation was awarded the same slot allocation with three, determined by the ranking of its Continental Championships in 2023. As a courtesy, the host team receives an automatic berth selection, as has happened with the immediate past tournament winner in 2022. The remaining places were determined by the FIVB World Ranking at the end of August 2024, without the continental bias.

Of FIVB's 222 national federations, 62 women's national teams entered or qualified for the Continental Championships in 2023, while Russia and Belarus were barred due to suspension from CEV and FIVB competitions following their country's invasion of Ukraine. For Europe, eleven additional teams entered the qualifiers of their Continental Championship. The other nine teams were listed in the FIVB World Ranking at the end of August 2024, but did not compete in their Continental Championships.

=== Qualified teams ===
Status of countries with respect to the 2025 FIVB Women's Volleyball World Championship: Qualified to the World Championship Failed to qualify Suspended Neither entered in the Continental Championships nor listed in the FIVB World Ranking at the end of August 2024

Defending champions Serbia qualified automatically. Therefore, its performance in the 2023 European Championship were not taken into account for the CEV slots. Amidst the unresolved host selection process, the all-Asian candidate teams—including Hong Kong, Indonesia, the Philippines, Thailand and Vietnam—continued to pursue their qualification in the 2023 Asian Championship in Nakhon Ratchasima, Thailand. If the host team was ranked in the top three, its AVC slot was allocated to the fourth-place team. However, Indonesia refused to join the tournament.

On 22 August 2023, Brazil, Argentina and Colombia became qualified teams from CSV by topping the round-robin of the 2023 South American Championship, held in Recife, Brazil. The following day, Kenya and Egypt won their semifinals of the 2023 African Championship in Yaoundé and secured the CAVB spots. Egypt returned to the World Championship after being absent since 2006. The other spot was awarded to the tournament's host Cameroon, which defeated Rwanda in the bronze medal match on 24 August 2023.

As Serbia reached the semifinals of the 2023 European Championship on 30 August 2023, the other semifinalists, including Turkey, the Netherlands and Italy qualified for the World Championship. On 3 September 2023, the NORCECA slots were awarded to Dominican Republic and the United States after they surpassed the semifinals of the 2023 NORCECA Championship in Quebec City, Canada. In the bronze medal match the next day, Canada defeated Cuba and qualified for the World Championship.

On 5 September 2023, Thailand and China advanced to the final of the 2023 Asian Championship and qualified directly for the World Championship. Japan followed them after beating Vietnam in the bronze medal match the next day. However, when Thailand was named the host country on 30 August 2024, Vietnam also qualified, making its debut in the tournament.

Finally, the remaining fifteen places were allocated to the highest-ranked teams according to the FIVB World Rankings at the end of August 2024. All of these teams were from CEV and NORCECA, with twelve from CEV and three from NORCECA. Slovakia, Slovenia and Sweden made their World Championship debut. Meanwhile, France, Spain, Ukraine and Greece returned to the tournament after long absences, having last participated in 1974, 1982, 1994, and 2002, respectively. Additionally, Cuba and Mexico returned to the tournament after missing the 2022 edition. In contrast, South Korea, Kazakhstan and Croatia, all of whom qualified for the 2022 edition, failed to qualify due to insufficient rankings.

The following thirty-two teams qualified for the tournament, listed by the method of qualification.

Country	Confederation	Qualified as	Qualified on	Previous appearances			Previous best performance
Country	Confederation	Qualified as	Qualified on	Total	First	Last	Previous best performance
Thailand^{a}	AVC	Host country	30 August 2024	6	1998	2022	13th place (1998, 2010, 2018, 2022)
Serbia^{bc}	CEV	Defending champions	15 October 2022	6	1978	2022	Champions (2018, 2022)
Brazil	CSV	2023 South American champions	22 August 2023	17	1956	2022	Runners-up (1994, 2006, 2010, 2022)
Argentina	CSV	2023 South American runners-up	22 August 2023	7	1960	2022	8th place (1960)
Colombia	CSV	2023 South American 3rd placers	22 August 2023	1	2022		21st place (2022)
Kenya	CAVB	2023 African champions	23 August 2023	7	1994	2022	13th place (1994, 1998)
Egypt	CAVB	2023 African runners-up	23 August 2023	3	1990	2006	16th place (1990)
Cameroon	CAVB	2023 African 3rd placers	24 August 2023	4	2006	2022	21st place (2006, 2014, 2018)
Turkey^{d}	CEV	2023 European champions	30 August 2023	5	2006	2022	6th place (2010)
Netherlands	CEV	2023 European 3rd placers	30 August 2023	15	1956	2022	4th place (2018)
Italy^{c}	CEV	2023 European 4th placers	30 August 2023	12	1978	2022	Champions (2002)
Dominican Republic	NORCECA	2023 NORCECA champions	2 September 2023	9	1974	2022	5th place (2014)
United States	NORCECA	2023 NORCECA runners-up	2 September 2023	17	1956	2022	Champions (2014)
Canada	NORCECA	2023 NORCECA 3rd placers	3 September 2023	10	1974	2022	10th place (2022)
China	AVC	2023 Asian runners-up	5 September 2023	15	1956	2022	Champions (1982, 1986)
Japan	AVC	2023 Asian 3rd placers	6 September 2023	17	1960	2022	Champions (1962, 1967, 1974)
Vietnam^{a}	AVC	2023 Asian 4th placers	30 August 2024	0	None		None
Poland	CEV	1st World ranked non-qualified team	30 August 2024	11	1952	2022	Runners-up (1952)
Germany^{e}	CEV	2nd World ranked non-qualified team	30 August 2024	17	1956	2022	4th place (1974, 1986)
Belgium	CEV	3rd World ranked non-qualified team	30 August 2024	4	1956	2022	9th place (2022)
Czech Republic^{fg}	CEV	4th World ranked non-qualified team	30 August 2024	12	1952	2022	3rd place (1952, 1960)
Puerto Rico	NORCECA	5th World ranked non-qualified team	30 August 2024	8	1974	2022	10th place (2002)
Ukraine	CEV	6th World ranked non-qualified team	30 August 2024	1	1994		9th place (1994)
France	CEV	7th World ranked non-qualified team	30 August 2024	3	1952	1974	7th place (1952)
Bulgaria	CEV	8th World ranked non-qualified team	30 August 2024	13	1952	2022	4th place (1952)
Cuba	NORCECA	9th World ranked non-qualified team	30 August 2024	13	1970	2018	Champions (1978, 1994, 1998)
Sweden	CEV	10th World ranked non-qualified team	30 August 2024	0	None		None
Mexico	NORCECA	11th World ranked non-qualified team	30 August 2024	8	1970	2018	10th place (1974)
Slovenia	CEV	12th World ranked non-qualified team	30 August 2024	0	None		None
Slovakia	CEV	13th World ranked non-qualified team	30 August 2024	0	None		None
Spain	CEV	14th World ranked non-qualified team	30 August 2024	1	1982		20th place (1982)
Greece	CEV	15th World ranked non-qualified team	30 August 2024	1	2002		10th place (2002)

Notes
^{a} Originally qualified on 5 September 2023 as the Asian champions. Their spot was allocated to Vietnam, after being awarded hosting rights on 30 August 2024.
^{b} Competed as SFR Yugoslavia in 1978 (1 time) and as Serbia and Montenegro in 2006 (1 time); 4 appearances as Serbia.
^{c} Originally qualified on 15 October 2022 as the defending champions. Their spot was allocated to Italy, after finishing the European Championship as the runners-up.
^{d} Designated as Türkiye since June 2022.
^{e} Competed as East Germany from 1956 to 1990 (7 times) and as West Germany from 1956 to 1990 (8 times); 8 appearances as Germany.
^{f} Designated as Czechia since 2016.
^{g} Competed as Czechoslovakia from 1952 to 1986 (8 times); 4 appearances as Czech Republic.

== Format ==
The tournament was played in two rounds: a preliminary round (pool phase) and a final round (direct elimination phase). During the preliminary round, 32 qualified teams were divided into eight pools, labeled A through H, with four teams in each pool. In this phase, every team within a pool competed against the other three teams once. After the pool phase, the top two teams from each pool advanced to the final round, creating a round of 16 teams. Simultaneously, the bottom two teams from each pool were ranked from 17th to 32nd based on the Team Combined Ranking System.

The final round follows a single-elimination format with the round of 16 match-ups determined by each team's pool and ranking position. The initial pairings—A1 versus H2, H1 versus A2, D1 versus E2, E1 versus D2, B1 versus G2, G1 versus B2, C1 versus F2, and F1 versus B2—ensured that teams from pools A, D, E, and H would not encounter with teams from pools B, C, F, and G until the final match. As the competition progresses, the round of 16 losers were ranked from 9th to 16th according to the Team Combined Ranking System, while the winners advance to the quarterfinals. The quarterfinals followed a similar pattern, with losing teams ranked from 5th to 8th, and victorious teams moving to the next stage of the competition. In the semifinals, the losers competed for the third place, while the winners faced each other in the final match.

== Pools composition ==
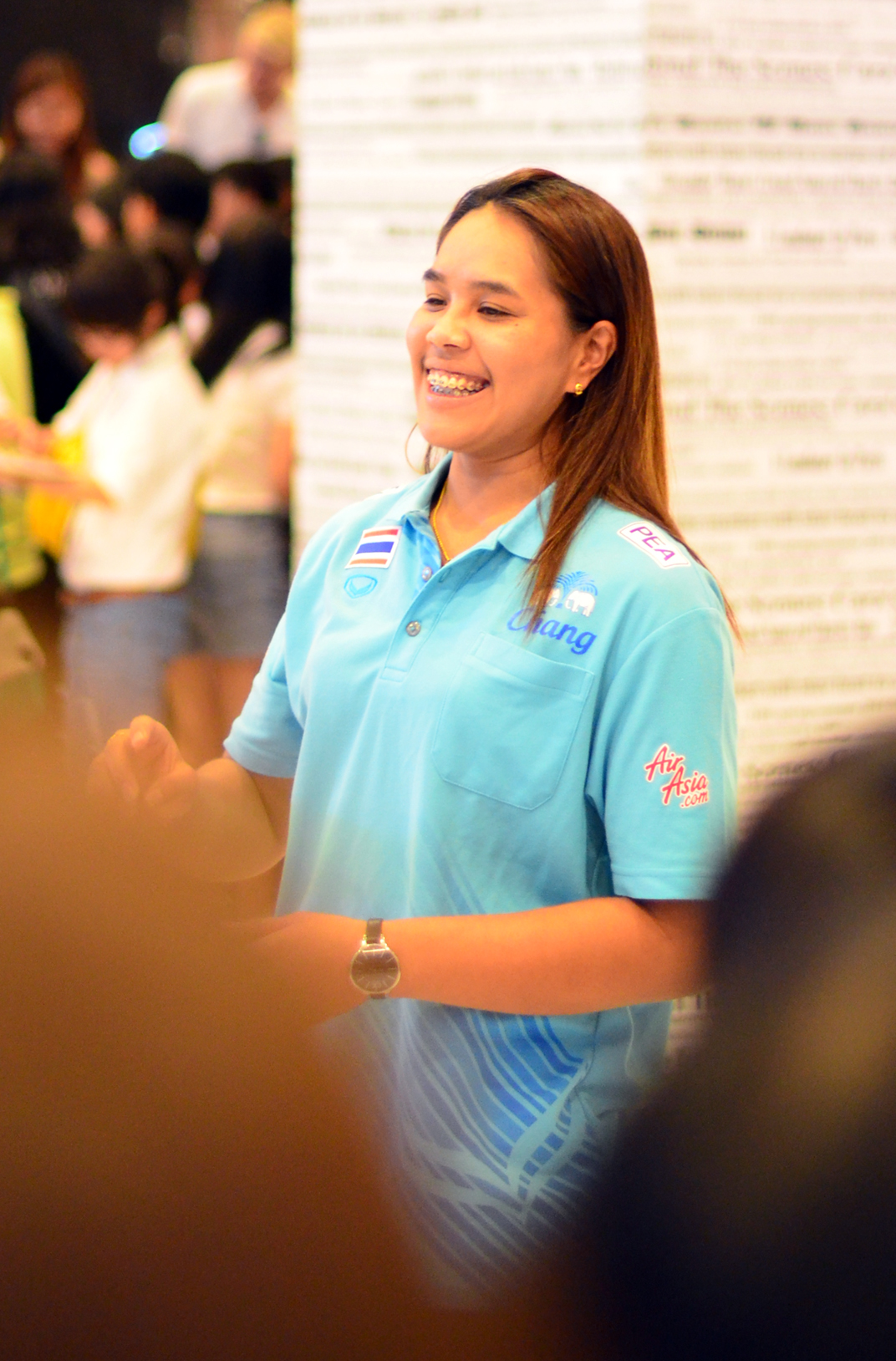
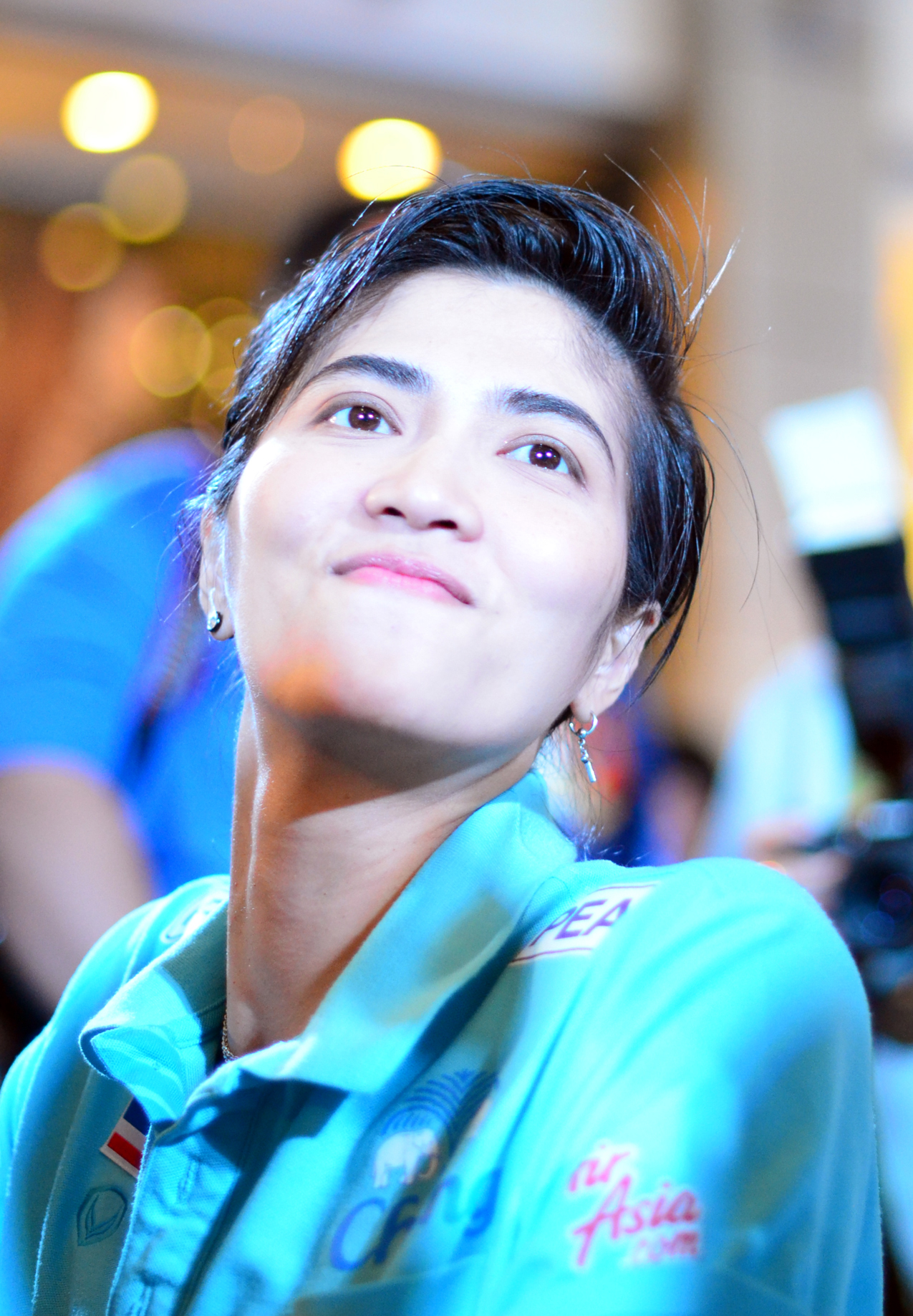
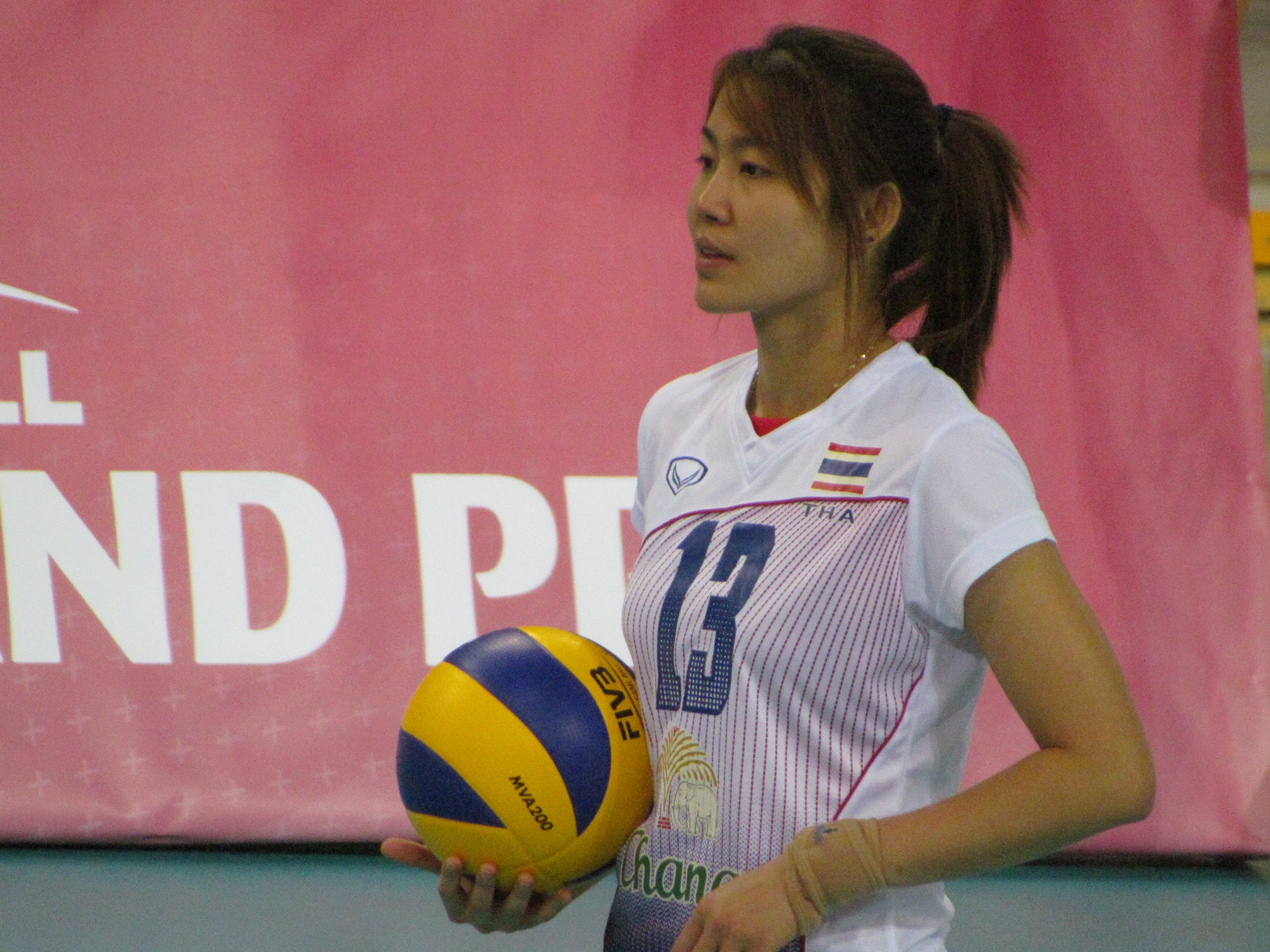
Drawing assistants: Onuma Sittirak for pot 3; Pleumjit Thinkaow for pot 2; and Nootsara Tomkom for pot 1

External videos
- Drawing of Lots

The final draw was held at The Grand Fourwings Convention Hotel in Bangkok, Thailand, on 17 December 2024, 15:00 ICT, after the host confirmation by the Government of Thailand. The draw was graced by the presence of Sorawong Thienthong, Minister of Tourism and Sports (MOTS); Ramon Suzara, President of the Asian Volleyball Confederation (AVC) and Vice President of the FIVB; Somporn Chaibangyang, President of the Thailand Volleyball Association (TVA); Preecha Lalun, Deputy Governor of the Sports Authority of Thailand (SAT); and Kiattipong Radchatagriengkai, Head coach of the Thailand women's national volleyball team and led by three of seven legends of Thai volleyball, including Onuma Sittirak, Pleumjit Thinkaow, and Nootsara Tomkom.

Based on the FIVB World Rankings at the end of August 2024, the tournament seeding followed a protocol where Thailand, as the host country, was automatically assigned to position A1, and the top seven teams in the World Rankings were placed as the first position in their respective pools. These top-seeded teams include Italy (B1), Brazil (C1), the United States (D1), Turkey (E1), China (F1), Poland (G1) and Japan (H1), distributing the highest-ranked teams across different pools.

For the draw, the 24 non-seeded teams were allocated into three pots based on the World Rankings. Pot 1 featured the next eight high-ranked teams, notably including the defending champion Serbia, while Pot 2 contained the subsequent eight highest-ranked teams, and Pot 3 comprised the eight lowest-ranked teams in the competition. The draw process followed a systematic approach, beginning with Pot 3 and concluding with Pot 1, where each selected team was assigned to the available pool in alphabetical order, utilizing a serpentine system that alternates the direction of team placement.

=== Seeding ===
Teams were seeded using the FIVB World Rankings at the end of August 2024 (shown in parentheses), which were published on 30 August 2024.

Seeded teams	Pot 1	Pot 2	Pot 3
Thailand (13) (hosts); Italy (1); Brazil (2); United States (3); Turkey (4); China (5); Poland (6); Japan (7)	Canada (8); Netherlands (9); Serbia (10); Dominican Republic (11); Germany (12); Belgium (14); Czech Republic (15); Puerto Rico (16)	Argentina (17); Ukraine (18); France (19); Bulgaria (20); Colombia (21); Kenya (22); Cuba (23); Sweden (24)	Mexico (25); Slovenia (26); Cameroon (27); Slovakia (28); Spain (29); Greece (30); Vietnam (33); Egypt (36)

=== Draw ===
The eight pools were formed through a random draw, with one team selected from each of the three pots and assigned to a pool based on their pot placement. Eight teams had their positions in the draw predetermined: host nation Thailand, positioned as A1, and the top seven teams in the World Rankings, each occupying the first position in their respective pools. These top-seeded teams include Italy (B1), Brazil (C1), the United States (D1), Turkey (E1), China (F1), Poland (G1), and Japan (H1).

Pool A
Pos.	Team
A1	Thailand
A2	Netherlands
A3	Sweden
A4	Egypt

Pool B
Pos.	Team
B1	Italy
B2	Belgium
B3	Cuba
B4	Slovakia

Pool C
Pos.	Team
C1	Brazil
C2	Puerto Rico
C3	France
C4	Greece

Pool D
Pos.	Team
D1	United States
D2	Czech Republic
D3	Argentina
D4	Slovenia

Pool E
Pos.	Team
E1	Turkey
E2	Canada
E3	Bulgaria
E4	Spain

Pool F
Pos.	Team
F1	China
F2	Dominican Republic
F3	Colombia
F4	Mexico

Pool G
Pos.	Team
G1	Poland
G2	Germany
G3	Kenya
G4	Vietnam

Pool H
Pos.	Team
H1	Japan
H2	Serbia
H3	Ukraine
H4	Cameroon

== Venues ==
Locations of the host cities
- 1 Bangkok
- 2 Chiang Mai
- 3 Nakhon Ratchasima
- 4 Phuket

Thailand proposed a tournament hosting plan featuring four potential cities across two strategic options. The first option centered on Bangkok and Nakhon Ratchasima, with Bangkok designated to host the final round. The alternative proposal expanded the venues to include Chiang Mai and Phuket for preliminary matches. These cities represented key urban centers in their respective regions, with Nakhon Ratchasima, Bangkok, and Chiang Mai being the largest cities in their areas. Phuket was the notable exception, being the second-largest city in Southern Thailand after Hat Yai. In December 2024, the Thai government officially endorsed the four-city hosting proposal. Later, FIVB confirmed the tournament was hosted in four separate cities on 11 December 2024.

Bangkok hosted numerous international sports events, including four editions of the Asian Games and one edition of the FISU World University Games. The city also had a long history in volleyball, having hosted major tournaments such as the finals of the 2024 FIVB Women's Volleyball Nations League and the 2016 FIVB Volleyball World Grand Prix, as well as a decade of preliminary matches of the Volleyball World Grand Prix and the Volleyball Nations League. Meanwhile, Nakhon Ratchasima hosted preliminary matches of the 2018 FIVB Women's Volleyball Nations League and three editions of the Women's Junior World Championship and Girls' Youth World Championship, in addition to numerous continental volleyball events.

Phuket served as the host city of the FIVB Beach Volleyball U19 and U21 World Championships in 2021 and previously served as the venue for several FIVB Beach Volleyball World Tours. Similarly, Chiang Mai hosted the rebranded FIVB Volleyball World Beach Pro Tour in 2023.

In the tournament, each group strategically selected host cities based on multiple factors such as local interest, tourist demographics, and national connections. Pool A and H (seeded by Thailand and Japan) competed in Bangkok, capitalizing on their strong fan base among local volleyball enthusiasts. Phuket hosted Pool B and G (seeded by Italy and Poland), leveraging its appeal to European tourists. Chiang Mai was the venue for Pool C and F (seeded by Brazil and China), taking advantage of the city's popularity among Chinese travelers. Meanwhile, Nakhon Ratchasima, with its historical connection to the United States Air Force, hosted Pool D and E (seeded by the United States and Turkey).

=== Indoor arenas ===
The following four indoor arenas hosted for the tournament.

Pool A, H and Final round	Pool B and G	Pool C and F	Pool D and E
Bangkok	Phuket	Chiang Mai	Nakhon Ratchasima
Indoor Stadium Huamark	Phuket Municipal Stadium	CMECC	Korat Chatchai Hall
Capacity: 6,882	Capacity: 3,337	Capacity: 4,440	Capacity: 5,564

== Preparations ==
Several teams participated in official tournaments or in exhibition ones, either ad hoc or already existing ones, to prepare for the World Championship.

=== CEV Volleyball European Golden League ===
Greece, Slovakia, Slovenia, Spain, Sweden, and Ukraine featured in the tournament from 29 May to 29 June, with Ängelholm, Sweden, hosting the final. Ukraine won their title after defeating Hungary in the final. Romania claimed their bronze medal after defeating Sweden in the third-place match.

=== FIVB Volleyball Nations League ===
17 national teams took part in the tournament from 4 June to 27 July, with Łódź, Poland, hosting the final. Italy won their title after defeating Brazil in the final. Poland claimed their bronze medal after defeating Japan in the third-place match.

=== AVC Volleyball Nations Cup ===
Vietnam featured in the tournament from 7 to 14 June in Hanoi, Vietnam. Vietnam won their title after defeating the Philippines in the final.

=== NORCECA Final Four ===
Mexico and Puerto Rico participated in the tournament from 16 to 21 July in Manati, Puerto Rico. Puerto Rico won their title after defeating Mexico in the final. Cuba was originally set to participate but withdrew, and Trinidad and Tobago replaced them.

=== NORCECA/CSV Pan-American Cup ===
Canada, Colombia, Cuba, the Dominican Republic, Mexico and Puerto Rico participated in the tournament from 3 to 10 August in Colima, Mexico. Dominican Republic won their title after defeating Colombia in the final. Puerto Rico claimed their bronze medal after defeating Mexico in the third-place match. Canada competed with a reserve squad, while the United States had initially intended to field a reserve team but ultimately withdrew from the tournament.

=== Other official tournaments ===
Thailand and Vietnam competed in the SEA V.League from 1 to 10 August, while Belgium, Germany, Greece, Slovenia and Spain took part in the qualification phase of the CEV EuroVolley from 2 to 10 August.

== Squads ==
Each national team had to register a long-list roster with up to 25 players, which eventually had to be reduced to a final list of 14 players.

== Team ranking system ==
=== Pool standing procedure ===
To establish the ranking of teams after the preliminary round, the following criteria were implemented:

1. Total number of victories (matches won, matches lost)
2. In the event of a tie, the teams will be ranked by the most point gained per match as follows:
  - Match won 3–0 or 3–1: 3 points for the winner, 0 points for the loser
  - Match won 3–2: 2 points for the winner, 1 point for the loser
  - Match forfeited: 3 points for the winner, 0 points (0–25, 0–25, 0–25) for the loser
3. If teams are still tied after examining the number of victories and points gained, then the FIVB will examine the results in order to break the tie in the following order:
  - Set quotient: if two or more teams are tied on the number of points gained, they will be ranked by the quotient resulting from the division of the number of all set won by the number of all sets lost.
  - Points quotient: if the tie persists based on the set quotient, the teams will be ranked by the quotient resulting from the division of all points scored by the total of points lost during all sets.
  - If the tie persists based on the point quotient, the tie will be broken based on the team that won the match of the Round Robin Phase between the tied teams. When the tie in point quotient is between three or more teams, these teams ranked taking into consideration only the matches involving the teams in question.

=== Teams combined ranking system ===
To establish the final ranking of teams of the tournament, the following criteria were implemented:

1. Position of the team in the Pool (1st, 2nd, 3rd and 4th)
2. Total number of victories (matches won, matches lost)
3. In the event of a tie, the teams will be ranked by the most point gained per match as follows:
  - Match won 3–0 or 3–1: 3 points for the winner, 0 points for the loser
  - Match won 3–2: 2 points for the winner, 1 point for the loser
  - Match forfeited: 3 points for the winner, 0 points (0–25, 0–25, 0–25) for the loser
4. If teams are still tied after examining the number of victories and points gained, then the FIVB will examine the results in order to break the tie in the following order:
  - Set quotient: if two or more teams are tied on the number of points gained, they will be ranked by the quotient resulting from the division of the number of all set won by the number of all sets lost.
  - Points quotient: if the tie persists based on the set quotient, the teams will be ranked by the quotient resulting from the division of all points scored by the total of points lost during all sets.
  - If the tie persists based on the point quotient, the tie will be broken based on the team that won the match of the Round Robin Phase between the tied teams. When the tie in point quotient is between three or more teams, these teams ranked taking into consideration only the matches involving the teams in question.

After the round of 16 and the quarterfinals, the eliminated teams were ranked in the final standings according to the Teams Combined Ranking System, which takes into account all matches played during both the preliminary and final rounds.

== Preliminary round ==
- All times are Thailand Standard Time (UTC+07:00)

In the preliminary round, competing teams were divided into eight pools of four teams (pools A to H). Teams in each pool played one another in a round-robin, where the top two teams advanced to the final round. Meanwhile, the bottom two teams from each pool were ranked from 17th to 32nd based on the teams combined ranking system.

=== Pool A ===
Venue: Indoor Stadium Huamark, Bangkok

Pool A was one of eight pools of the preliminary round of the 2025 FIVB Women's Volleyball World Championship. The pool consisted of the host country, Thailand, as well as the Netherlands, Sweden, and Egypt. It took place in Bangkok from 22 to 26 August 2025, with rest days on 23 and 25 August. Each matchday featured two games, held at 17:00 and 20:30. As the seeded team, Thailand played all of its matches at 20:30. The Netherlands and Thailand advanced to the round of 16.

Pos	Team	Pld	W	L	Pts	SW	SL	SR	SPW	SPL	SPR	Qualification
1	Netherlands	3	3	0	7	9	4	2.250	298	225	1.324	Final round
2	Thailand (H)	3	2	1	7	8	4	2.000	264	238	1.109	Final round
3	Sweden	3	1	2	4	5	7	0.714	254	268	0.948	
4	Egypt	3	0	3	0	2	9	0.222	189	274	0.690	

Source: FIVB Women's World Championship - Standings
Rules for classification: Pool standing procedure
(H) Host

Date	Time		Score		Set 1	Set 2	Set 3	Set 4	Set 5	Total	Report
22 Aug	17:00	Netherlands	3–2	Sweden	25–27	25–11	25–21	21–25	15–9	111–93	P2 Report
22 Aug	20:30	Thailand	3–1	Egypt	25–15	23–25	25–15	25–11		98–66	P2 Report
24 Aug	17:00	Netherlands	3–0	Egypt	25–15	25–13	25–13			75–41	P2 Report
24 Aug	20:30	Thailand	3–0	Sweden	25–18	25–20	25–22			75–60	P2 Report
26 Aug	17:00	Sweden	3–1	Egypt	25–18	26–28	25–20	25–16		101–82	P2 Report
26 Aug	20:30	Thailand	2–3	Netherlands	25–23	17–25	25–23	10–25	14–16	91–112	P2 Report

=== Pool B ===
Venue: Phuket Municipal Stadium, Phuket

Pool B was one of eight pools of the preliminary round of the 2025 FIVB Women's Volleyball World Championship. The pool consisted of the Olympic champion, Italy, as well as Belgium, Cuba, and Slovakia. It took place in Phuket from 22 to 26 August 2025, with rest days on 23 and 25 August. Each matchday features two games, held at 17:00 and 20:30. As the seeded team, Italy played at 20:30 in the first match against Slovakia, while their two remaining matches against Cuba and Belgium were played at 17:00 due to a broadcast time conflict with the Thailand vs. Sweden and the Thailand vs. Netherlands match in Pool A. Italy and Belgium advanced to the round of 16.

Pos	Team	Pld	W	L	Pts	SW	SL	SR	SPW	SPL	SPR	Qualification
1	Italy	3	3	0	9	9	1	9.000	246	159	1.547	Final round
2	Belgium	3	2	1	6	7	3	2.333	225	198	1.136	Final round
3	Cuba	3	1	2	3	3	7	0.429	181	245	0.739	
4	Slovakia	3	0	3	0	1	9	0.111	200	250	0.800	

Source: FIVB Women's World Championship - Standings
Rules for classification: Pool standing procedure

Date	Time		Score		Set 1	Set 2	Set 3	Set 4	Set 5	Total	Report
22 Aug	17:00	Belgium	3–0	Cuba	25–23	25–14	25–11			75–48	P2 Report
22 Aug	20:30	Italy	3–0	Slovakia	25–20	25–14	25–17			75–51	P2 Report
24 Aug	17:00	Italy	3–0	Cuba	25–9	25–8	25–16			75–33	P2 Report
24 Aug	20:30	Belgium	3–0	Slovakia	25–19	25–17	25–18			75–54	P2 Report
26 Aug	17:00	Italy	3–1	Belgium	25–16	25–16	21–25	25–18		96–75	P2 Report
26 Aug	20:30	Cuba	3–1	Slovakia	27–25	25–21	22–25	26–24		100–95	P2 Report

=== Pool C ===
Venue: Chiang Mai International Exhibition and Convention Centre, Chiang Mai

Pos	Team	Pld	W	L	Pts	SW	SL	SR	SPW	SPL	SPR	Qualification
1	Brazil	3	3	0	8	9	2	4.500	256	195	1.313	Final round
2	France	3	2	1	7	8	5	1.600	286	274	1.044	Final round
3	Greece	3	1	2	3	4	7	0.571	237	241	0.983	
4	Puerto Rico	3	0	3	0	2	9	0.222	200	269	0.743	

Source: FIVB Women's World Championship - Standings
Rules for classification: Pool standing procedure

Date	Time		Score		Set 1	Set 2	Set 3	Set 4	Set 5	Total	Report
22 Aug	16:00	Puerto Rico	1–3	France	22–25	18–25	25–21	14–25		79–96	P2 Report
22 Aug	19:30	Brazil	3–0	Greece	25–18	25–16	25–16			75–50	P2 Report
24 Aug	16:00	Puerto Rico	1–3	Greece	19–25	13–25	25–23	14–25		71–98	P2 Report
24 Aug	19:30	Brazil	3–2	France	21–25	20–25	25–15	25–17	15–13	106–95	P2 Report
26 Aug	16:00	France	3–1	Greece	17–25	25–21	28–26	25–17		95–89	P2 Report
26 Aug	19:30	Brazil	3–0	Puerto Rico	25–19	25–13	25–18			75–50	P2 Report

=== Pool D ===
Venue: Korat Chatchai Hall, Nakhon Ratchasima

Pos	Team	Pld	W	L	Pts	SW	SL	SR	SPW	SPL	SPR	Qualification
1	United States	3	3	0	9	9	2	4.500	266	211	1.261	Final round
2	Slovenia	3	1	2	4	6	6	1.000	263	261	1.008	Final round
3	Argentina	3	1	2	3	4	7	0.571	225	262	0.859	
4	Czech Republic	3	1	2	2	4	8	0.500	254	274	0.927	

Source: FIVB Women's World Championship - Standings
Rules for classification: Pool standing procedure

Date	Time		Score		Set 1	Set 2	Set 3	Set 4	Set 5	Total	Report
22 Aug	16:00	Czech Republic	1–3	Argentina	25–18	23–25	17–25	24–26		89–94	P2 Report
22 Aug	19:30	United States	3–1	Slovenia	25–23	17–25	25–22	25–14		92–84	P2 Report
24 Aug	16:00	Czech Republic	3–2	Slovenia	22–25	19–25	25–23	25–18	15–13	106–104	P2 Report
24 Aug	19:30	United States	3–1	Argentina	25–14	23–25	25–12	25–17		98–68	P2 Report
26 Aug	16:00	Argentina	0–3	Slovenia	20–25	22–25	21–25			63–75	P2 Report
26 Aug	19:30	United States	3–0	Czech Republic	26–24	25–20	25–15			76–59	P2 Report

=== Pool E ===
Venue: Korat Chatchai Hall, Nakhon Ratchasima

Pos	Team	Pld	W	L	Pts	SW	SL	SR	SPW	SPL	SPR	Qualification
1	Turkey	3	3	0	9	9	0	MAX	227	175	1.297	Final round
2	Canada	3	2	1	5	6	6	1.000	271	263	1.030	Final round
3	Spain	3	1	2	4	5	7	0.714	260	268	0.970	
4	Bulgaria	3	0	3	0	2	9	0.222	218	270	0.807	

Source: FIVB Women's World Championship - Standings
Rules for classification: Pool standing procedure

Date	Time		Score		Set 1	Set 2	Set 3	Set 4	Set 5	Total	Report
23 Aug	16:00	Canada	3–1	Bulgaria	25–23	25–18	23–25	25–18		98–84	P2 Report
23 Aug	19:30	Turkey	3–0	Spain	25–18	25–20	25–23			75–61	P2 Report
25 Aug	16:00	Canada	3–2	Spain	22–25	28–26	24–26	25–15	15–10	114–102	P2 Report
25 Aug	19:30	Turkey	3–0	Bulgaria	25–23	25–19	25–13			75–55	P2 Report
27 Aug	16:00	Turkey	3–0	Canada	25–21	27–25	25–13			77–59	P2 Report
27 Aug	19:30	Bulgaria	1–3	Spain	22–25	14–25	25–22	18–25		79–97	P2 Report

=== Pool F ===
Venue: Chiang Mai International Exhibition and Convention Centre, Chiang Mai

Pos	Team	Pld	W	L	Pts	SW	SL	SR	SPW	SPL	SPR	Qualification
1	China	3	3	0	9	9	2	4.500	271	201	1.348	Final round
2	Dominican Republic	3	2	1	6	6	3	2.000	203	173	1.173	Final round
3	Mexico	3	1	2	2	4	8	0.500	234	280	0.836	
4	Colombia	3	0	3	1	3	9	0.333	224	278	0.806	

Source: FIVB Women's World Championship - Standings
Rules for classification: Pool standing procedure

Date	Time		Score		Set 1	Set 2	Set 3	Set 4	Set 5	Total	Report
23 Aug	16:00	Dominican Republic	3–0	Colombia	25–15	25–18	25–13			75–46	P2 Report
23 Aug	19:30	China	3–1	Mexico	22–25	26–24	25–10	25–18		98–77	P2 Report
25 Aug	16:00	Dominican Republic	3–0	Mexico	25–15	25–17	25–20			75–52	P2 Report
25 Aug	19:30	China	3–1	Colombia	25–16	23–25	25–14	25–16		98–71	P2 Report
27 Aug	16:00	Colombia	2–3	Mexico	22–25	25–22	23–25	25–18	12–15	107–105	P2 Report
27 Aug	19:30	China	3–0	Dominican Republic	25–15	25–21	25–17			75–53	P2 Report

=== Pool G ===
Venue: Phuket Municipal Stadium, Phuket

Pos	Team	Pld	W	L	Pts	SW	SL	SR	SPW	SPL	SPR	Qualification
1	Poland	3	3	0	8	9	4	2.250	300	248	1.210	Final round
2	Germany	3	2	1	7	8	3	2.667	258	218	1.183	Final round
3	Kenya	3	1	2	3	4	6	0.667	196	228	0.860	
4	Vietnam	3	0	3	0	1	9	0.111	188	248	0.758	

Source: FIVB Women's World Championship - Standings
Rules for classification: Pool standing procedure

Date	Time		Score		Set 1	Set 2	Set 3	Set 4	Set 5	Total	Report
23 Aug	17:00	Germany	3–0	Kenya	25–22	25–8	25–20			75–50	P2 Report
23 Aug	20:30	Poland	3–1	Vietnam	23–25	25–10	25–12	25–22		98–69	P2 Report
25 Aug	17:00	Germany	3–0	Vietnam	25–18	25–17	25–21			75–56	P2 Report
25 Aug	20:30	Poland	3–1	Kenya	25–17	15–25	25–15	25–14		90–71	P2 Report
27 Aug	17:00	Kenya	3–0	Vietnam	25–23	25–22	25–18			75–63	P2 Report
27 Aug	20:30	Poland	3–2	Germany	21–25	25–15	19–25	28–26	19–17	112–108	P2 Report

=== Pool H ===
Venue: Indoor Stadium Huamark, Bangkok

Pos	Team	Pld	W	L	Pts	SW	SL	SR	SPW	SPL	SPR	Qualification
1	Japan	3	3	0	8	9	3	3.000	289	258	1.120	Final round
2	Serbia	3	2	1	6	7	3	2.333	244	205	1.190	Final round
3	Ukraine	3	1	2	4	5	6	0.833	239	244	0.980	
4	Cameroon	3	0	3	0	0	9	0.000	160	225	0.711	

Source: FIVB Women's World Championship - Standings
Rules for classification: Pool standing procedure

Date	Time		Score		Set 1	Set 2	Set 3	Set 4	Set 5	Total	Report
23 Aug	17:00	Japan	3–0	Cameroon	25–21	25–17	25–19			75–57	P2 Report
23 Aug	20:30	Serbia	3–0	Ukraine	25–21	25–19	25–17			75–57	P2 Report
25 Aug	17:00	Japan	3–2	Ukraine	25–27	20–25	25–20	26–24	15–11	111–107	P2 Report
25 Aug	20:30	Serbia	3–0	Cameroon	25–16	25–17	25–12			75–45	P2 Report
27 Aug	17:00	Japan	3–1	Serbia	25–23	30–28	23–25	25–18		103–94	P2 Report
27 Aug	20:30	Ukraine	3–0	Cameroon	25–17	25–21	25–20			75–58	P2 Report

== Final round ==
- All times are Thailand Standard Time (UTC+07:00).
- All matches are played at the Indoor Stadium Huamark, Bangkok.

The final round followed a single-elimination format with teams from pools A, D, E, and H segregated from pools B, C, F, and G until the final match. The round of 16 losers were ranked from 9th to 16th places, while the quarterfinal losers were ranked from 5th to 8th places according to the teams combined ranking system. In the semifinals, the losers competed for third place, while the winners faced each other in the final match.

=== Bracket ===
The following sixteen teams are matched up, with bold denoting the winners of each match.

Round of 16
29 August
**Netherlands**	**3**
Serbia	2
29 August
**Japan**	**3**
Thailand	0
1 September
**United States**	**3**
Canada	0
1 September
**Turkey**	**3**
Slovenia	0
30 August
**Italy**	**3**
Germany	0
30 August
**Poland**	**3**
Belgium	2
31 August
**Brazil**	**3**
Dominican Republic	1
31 August
China	1
**France**	**3**

Quarterfinals
3 September
Netherlands	2
**Japan**	**3**
4 September
United States	1
**Turkey**	**3**
3 September
**Italy**	**3**
Poland	0
4 September
**Brazil**	**3**
France	0

Semifinals
6 September
Japan	1
**Turkey**	**3**
6 September
**Italy**	**3**
Brazil	2

Final
7 September
Turkey	2
**Italy**	**3**
3rd place match
7 September
Japan	2
**Brazil**	**3**

=== Round of 16 ===
Date	Time		Score		Set 1	Set 2	Set 3	Set 4	Set 5	Total	Report
29 Aug	17:00	**Netherlands**	3–2	Serbia	27–25	26–24	22–25	20–25	15–11	110–110	P2 Report
29 Aug	20:30	**Japan**	3–0	Thailand	25–20	25–23	25–23			75–66	P2 Report
30 Aug	17:00	**Italy**	3–0	Germany	25–22	25–18	25–11			75–51	P2 Report
30 Aug	20:30	**Poland**	3–2	Belgium	25–27	25–20	25–17	22–25	15–10	112–99	P2 Report
31 Aug	17:00	China	1–3	**France**	20–25	25–27	25–22	20–25		90–99	P2 Report
31 Aug	20:30	**Brazil**	3–1	Dominican Republic	18–25	25–12	25–20	25–12		93–69	P2 Report
1 Sep	17:00	**United States**	3–0	Canada	25–18	25–21	25–21			75–60	P2 Report
1 Sep	20:30	**Turkey**	3–0	Slovenia	30–28	25–13	29–27			84–68	P2 Report

=== Quarterfinals ===
Date	Time		Score		Set 1	Set 2	Set 3	Set 4	Set 5	Total	Report
3 Sep	17:00	Netherlands	**2–3**	**Japan**	25–20	20–25	25–22	22–25	12–15	**104–107**	P2 Report
3 Sep	20:30	**Italy**	**3–0**	Poland	25–17	25–21	25–18			**75–56**	P2 Report
4 Sep	17:00	**Brazil**	**3–0**	France	27–25	33–31	25–19			**85–75**	P2 Report
4 Sep	20:30	United States	**1–3**	**Turkey**	14–25	25–22	14–25	23–25		**76–97**	P2 Report

=== Semifinals ===
Date	Time		Score		Set 1	Set 2	Set 3	Set 4	Set 5	Total	Report
6 Sep	15:30	Japan	**1–3**	**Turkey**	25–16	17–25	18–25	25–27		**85–93**	P2 Report
6 Sep	19:30	**Italy**	**3–2**	Brazil	22–25	25–22	28–30	25–22	15–13	**115–112**	P2 Report

=== 3rd place match ===
Date	Time		Score		Set 1	Set 2	Set 3	Set 4	Set 5	Total	Report
7 Sep	15:30	Japan	**2–3**	**Brazil**	12–25	17–25	25–19	29–27	16–18	**99–114**	P2 Report

=== Final ===
Date	Time		Score		Set 1	Set 2	Set 3	Set 4	Set 5	Total	Report
7 Sep	19:30	Turkey	**2–3**	**Italy**	23–25	25–13	24–26	25–19	8–15	**105–98**	P2 Report

== Final standing ==
Rank	Team
1st place, gold medalist(s)	Italy
2nd place, silver medalist(s)	Turkey
3rd place, bronze medalist(s)	Brazil
4	Japan
5	United States
6	Netherlands
7	Poland
8	France
9	China
10	Serbia
11	Belgium
12	Germany
13	Thailand
14	Dominican Republic
15	Canada
16	Slovenia
17	Ukraine
18	Spain
19	Sweden
20	Kenya
21	Greece
22	Argentina
23	Cuba
24	Mexico
25	Czech Republic
26	Colombia
27	Bulgaria
28	Puerto Rico
29	Egypt
30	Slovakia
31	Vietnam
32	Cameroon

Qualified for the 2027 World Championship

2025 Women's World champions

Italy
Second title

14–woman roster
Carlotta Cambi, Monica De Gennaro, Eleonora Fersino, Alessia Orro, Benedetta Sartori, Anna Danesi (c), Stella Nervini, Myriam Sylla, Paola Egonu, Sarah Fahr, Loveth Omoruyi, Gaia Giovannini, Ekaterina Antropova, Yasmina Akrari
Head coach
(Argentina) (Italy) Julio Velasco

== Awards ==
The following awards were given at the conclusion of the tournament.

- Most valuable player
  (Italy) Alessia Orro
- Best setter
  (Italy) Alessia Orro
- Best outside spikers
  (Brazil) Gabriela Guimarães
  (Japan) Mayu Ishikawa
- Best opposite spiker
  (Turkey) Melissa Vargas
- Best middle blockers
  (Turkey) Eda Erdem
  (Italy) Anna Danesi
- Best libero
  (Italy) Monica De Gennaro

== Statistics leaders ==
The statistics of leaders for each skill are recorded throughout the tournament.

=== Best scorers ===
Statistics leaders correct as of preliminary round.
#	Player	Spikes	Blocks	Serves	Total
1	(Sweden) Isabelle Haak	85	5	5	95
2	(Argentina) Bianca Cugno	63	6	1	70
3	(Mexico) Sofía Maldonado	64	4	0	68
4	(France) Héléna Cazaute	58	6	2	66
5	(Greece) Martha Anthouli	58	5	3	66

=== Best spikers ===
Statistics leaders correct as of preliminary round.
#	Player	Spikes	Faults	Shots	%	Total
1	(Sweden) Isabelle Haak	85	19	75	47.49	179
2	(Mexico) Sofía Maldonado	64	30	57	42.38	151
3	(Argentina) Bianca Cugno	63	24	75	38.89	162
4	(Slovenia) Fatoumatta Sillah	59	21	70	39.33	150
5	(France) Héléna Cazaute	58	21	44	47.15	123

=== Best blockers ===
Statistics leaders correct as of preliminary round.
#	Player	Blocks	Faults	Rebounds	Avg	Total
1	(Ukraine) Diana Meliushkyna	15	15	13	5.00	43
2	(Mexico) Jocelyn Urías	13	22	17	4.33	52
3	(Slovenia) Nika Milošič	12	15	21	4.00	48
4	(Brazil) Júlia Kudiess	12	14	12	4.00	38
5	(Netherlands) Nika Daalderop	11	8	10	3.67	29

=== Best servers ===
Statistics leaders correct as of preliminary round.
#	Player	Aces	Faults	Hits	Avg	Total
1	(Poland) Martyna Czyrniańska	10	2	42	3.33	54
2	(France) Iman Ndiaye	9	12	37	3.00	58
3	(Slovenia) Nika Milošič	6	7	35	2.00	48
4	(Sweden) Isabelle Haak	5	11	37	1.67	53
5	(Dominican Republic) Gaila González	5	5	23	1.67	33

=== Best setters ===
Statistics leaders correct as of preliminary round.
#	Player	Running	Faults	Still	Avg	Total
1	(Netherlands) Sarah van Aalen	131	1	117	43.67	249
2	(Slovenia) Eva Pavlović Mori	126	1	196	42.00	323
3	(Thailand) Pornpun Guedpard	117	1	154	39.00	272
4	(Czech Republic) Kateřina Valková	115	5	231	38.33	351
5	(United States) Jordyn Poulter	96	0	137	32.00	233

=== Best diggers ===
Statistics leaders correct as of preliminary round.
#	Player	Digs	Faults	Receptions	Avg	Total
1	(Czech Republic) Daniela Digrinová	48	14	17	16.00	79
2	(France) Juliette Gélin	47	13	14	15.67	74
3	(Thailand) Piyanut Pannoy	40	7	10	13.33	57
4	(Poland) Aleksandra Szczygłowska	39	12	16	13.00	67
5	(Netherlands) Florien Reesink	38	9	11	12.67	58

=== Best receivers ===
Statistics leaders correct as of preliminary round.
#	Player	Excellents	Faults	Serve	%	Total
1	(France) Héléna Cazaute	40	2	54	41.67	96
2	(Sweden) Filippa Brink	31	2	75	28.70	108
3	(Japan) Mayu Ishikawa	31	2	53	36.05	86
4	(Czech Republic) Daniela Digrinová	30	6	56	32.61	92
5	(France) Juliette Gélin	30	3	35	44.12	68

== Combined ranking ==
Rank	Zone	Team	Pld	W	L	Pts	SW	SL	SR	SPW	SPL	SPR	Qualification
1st place, gold medalist(s)	Europe	Italy	7	7	0	19	21	5	4.200	609	483	1.261	Qualified for the 2027 World Championship
2nd place, silver medalist(s)	Europe	Turkey	7	6	1	19	20	5	4.000	606	502	1.207	
3rd place, bronze medalist(s)	Americas	Brazil	7	6	1	17	20	8	2.500	660	553	1.193	
4	Asia	Japan	7	5	2	14	18	11	1.636	655	635	1.031	
5	Americas	United States	5	4	1	12	13	5	2.600	417	368	1.133	
6	Europe	Netherlands	5	4	1	10	14	9	1.556	512	442	1.158	
7	Europe	Poland	5	4	1	10	12	9	1.333	468	422	1.109	
8	Europe	France	5	3	2	10	11	9	1.222	460	449	1.024	
9	Asia	China	4	3	1	9	10	5	2.000	361	300	1.203	
10	Europe	Serbia	4	2	2	7	9	6	1.500	354	315	1.124	
11	Europe	Belgium	4	2	2	7	9	6	1.500	324	310	1.045	
12	Europe	Germany	4	2	2	7	8	6	1.333	309	293	1.055	
13	Asia	Thailand	4	2	2	7	8	7	1.143	330	313	1.054	
14	Americas	Dominican Republic	4	2	2	6	7	6	1.167	272	266	1.023	
15	Americas	Canada	4	2	2	5	6	9	0.667	206	231	0.892	
16	Europe	Slovenia	4	1	3	4	6	9	0.667	331	345	0.959	
17	Europe	Ukraine	3	1	2	4	5	6	0.833	239	244	0.980	
18	Europe	Spain	3	1	2	4	5	7	0.714	260	268	0.970	
19	Europe	Sweden	3	1	2	4	5	7	0.714	254	268	0.948	
20	Africa	Kenya	3	1	2	3	4	6	0.667	196	228	0.860	
21	Europe	Greece	3	1	2	3	4	7	0.571	237	241	0.983	
22	Americas	Argentina	3	1	2	3	4	7	0.571	225	262	0.859	
23	Americas	Cuba	3	1	2	3	3	7	0.429	181	245	0.739	
24	Americas	Mexico	3	1	2	2	4	8	0.500	234	280	0.836	
25	Europe	Czech Republic	3	1	2	2	4	8	0.500	254	274	0.927	
26	Americas	Colombia	3	0	3	1	3	9	0.333	224	278	0.806	
27	Europe	Bulgaria	3	0	3	0	2	9	0.222	218	270	0.807	
28	Americas	Puerto Rico	3	0	3	0	2	9	0.222	200	269	0.743	
29	Africa	Egypt	3	0	3	0	2	9	0.222	189	274	0.690	
30	Europe	Slovakia	3	0	3	0	1	9	0.111	200	250	0.800	
31	Asia	Vietnam	3	0	3	0	1	9	0.111	188	248	0.758	
32	Africa	Cameroon	3	0	3	0	0	9	0.000	160	225	0.711	

== Marketing ==
=== Branding ===
The official emblem for the FIVB Volleyball World Championship, created by branding agency Landor Associates, was revealed in December 2020. Inspired by the distinctive panels of a volleyball, each stripe symbolized an athlete in motion—moving, jumping, and diving across the court—and the overall shape resembled the tournament's trophy. The emblem's color palette was selected to represent the host nation. For this edition, the emblem featured a red color, reflective of the Thai national tricolour flag.

=== Sponsorship ===
The following brands and businesses are the global and local sponsors for the tournament. For local sponsors, Paul Poole, a marketing consultancy, has been appointed by the Volleyball World to manage sponsorship and partnership marketing efforts for the World Championship.

FIVB global partners	FIVB official suppliers	Official event sponsors	Official co-event sponsors
1xbet; Ganten; Mikasa Sports	Gerflor; Mizuno; Senoh	Hatari; Sponsor	AIS Play; Est Cola; Euro Cake; Piyavate Hospital; PPTV HD; Thai AirAsia

== See also ==
- 2025 FIVB Men's Volleyball World Championship
- 2025 FIVB Volleyball Women's U21 World Championship
- 2025 FIVB Volleyball Girls' U19 World Championship
