= FIVB Senior World Rankings =

Ranking system for men's and women's national teams in volleyball

The FIVB Senior World Rankings is a ranking system for men's and women's national teams in volleyball. The teams of the member nations of Fédération Internationale de Volleyball (FIVB), volleyball's world governing body, are ranked based on their game results with the most successful teams being ranked highest. A points system is used, with points being awarded based on the results of all FIVB-recognised full international matches. The rankings are used in international competitions to define the seeded teams and arrange them in pools. Specific procedures for seeding and pooling are established by the FIVB in each competition's formula, but the method usually employed is the serpentine system.

The ranking system has been revamped in 2020, responding to criticism that the preceding calculation method did not effectively reflect the relative strengths of the national teams. The old version of the ranking system was finally used on 31 January 2020.

As of 28 July 2026, the highest ranked team in the men's category is Poland, while in the women's category is Italy.

== Previous calculation method ==
The system of point attribution for the selected FIVB World and Official Competitions below is as follows:

- Olympic Games and qualifying tournaments: included for 4 years and points are also granted for the qualification matches, to the best non-qualified teams.
- World Championship and qualifying tournaments: included for 4 years and points are also granted for the qualification matches, to the best non-qualified teams.
- World Cup: included for 4 years
- World Grand Prix: included for 1 year
- World League: included for 1 year

== Current calculation method ==
In 2019, FIVB collaborated with Hypercube Business Innovation of the Netherlands to design a new world ranking platform. The previous calculation method had a problem of circularity in the international volleyball calendar: only countries who participated in the major volleyball events could earn ranking points, whilst the number of ranking points of countries also determined the seeding and access to major events. This unfair principle did not contribute to the sporting and commercial quality of volleyball.

On 1 February 2020, the new ranking system was implemented and took into account all results from 1 January 2019 and later. The system is consistently updated to reflect the latest results and performances. The ranking considers the match results from:

- Olympic Games and qualifying tournaments
- FIVB World Championship (Note: From 2027 the FIVB Volleyball World Championship is named FIVB Volleyball World Cup, not to be confused with the World Cup tournament that was discontinued in 2019.)
- FIVB World Cup (Note: Refers to the original tournament named FIVB Volleyball World Cup that was discontinued in 2019.)
- FIVB Nations League and Challenger Cup
- Confederations' Championship and qualifying tournaments
- Annual Official Continental Confederations' Events
- Annual Official Zonal Associations' Events

Notes:

- Olympic qualifying tournaments, FIVB World Cup and FIVB Challenger Cup are discontinued tournaments (as of 2025).
- Official competitions must feature a minimum of four senior national teams to be eligible for world ranking points.
- Matches played in multi-sport events, friendly matches or unofficial competitions are not eligible for world ranking points.
- From 2023: Matches from Annual Continental and Zonal Events are not considered for the world ranking if they involve teams that are also participating in the FIVB Volleyball Nations League (VNL) in the same year.
- From 2025: Each Continental Confederation may include up to two Annual Continental Events in the world ranking.
- From 2025: Each Zonal Association may include one Annual Zonal Event in the world ranking.

The rankings outcome of each match depends on two main factors:

- The playing strength of the teams competing.
- The actual match performance or final result of the match.

=== Ranking Procedure ===
It is based on the zero-sum system, like CONCACAF Ranking Index or FIFA World ranking, where, after each game, points will be added to or subtracted from a team's rating according to the formula:

$$S_\text{after} = S_\text{before} + {K(R-E) \over 8}$$

where:

- $S_\text{after}$ – the team's number of World Ranking scores after the game
- $S_\text{before}$ – the team's number of World Ranking scores before the game
- $K$ – the match weight factor; see below
- $R$ – the result of the game depended on match and sets won (3–0, 3–1, 3–2, 2–3, 1–3 or 0–3); see below
- $E$ – the expected result of the game has the value between -2 and +2. If the match is completely balanced, the expected result is 0. The bigger the surprise, the more points are transferred; see below for calculation details.

A key principle of the world ranking is that a team winning a match cannot lose ranking points and a team losing a match cannot gain ranking points. Hence, if a team wins a match but the result is lower than expected, with $R<E$, the team will be rewarded with the minimum ranking points (0.01), i.e.

$$S_\text{after} = S_\text{before} + 0.01$$

The team that lost the match will instead lose the minimum ranking points (0.01), i.e.

$$S_\text{after} = S_\text{before} - 0.01$$

==== Match weight factor ====
The match weight factor is set to reflect the prestige of the tournament. In 2025, FIVB changed the match weight factors for some events and introduced ranking points for events organized by zonal associations. In 2026, the match weight factor for zonal events was reduced.

Event	Match weight factor $(K)$		
Event	2019–2024	2025	2026–
Annual Official Zonal Events	–	30.0	20.0
Annual Official Continental Events	10.0	30.0	30.0
Continental Championship qualifying	17.5	–	–
FIVB Challenger Cup	20.0	–	–
Olympic Games qualifying / FIVB World Cup	35.0	–	–
Continental Championship	35.0	40.0	40.0
FIVB Nations League	40.0	40.0	40.0
FIVB World Championship/Cup	45.0	50.0	50.0
Olympic Games	50.0	50.0	50.0

==== Match result ====
We set the result $R=R_n$, where $n$ is the index of the actual result (set score)

- $n=1$ – A win 3–0
- $n=2$ – A win 3–1
- $n=3$ – A win 3–2
- $n=4$ – A lose 2–3
- $n=5$ – A lose 1–3
- $n=6$ – A lose 0–3

Match Result	$R_n$	$P_n$
A win 3–0	+2	$P\text{1}$
A win 3–1	+1.5	$P\text{2}$
A win 3–2	+1	$P\text{3}$
A lose 2–3	-1	$P\text{4}$
A lose 1–3	-1.5	$P\text{5}$
A lose 0–3	-2	$P\text{6}$

==== Expected match result ====
The expected results is then calculated as $E = R_1 P_1 + R_2 P_2 + R_3 P_3 + R_4 P_4 + R_5 P_5 + R_6 P_6$ where $P_n$ is the probability of the outcome $R_n$ obtained using the following model (known as Ordered probit):

Team A win 3–0
$$P_\text{1} = \Phi(C_\text{1}+\Delta)$$
Team A win 3–1
$$P_\text{2} = \Phi(C_\text{2}+\Delta) - \Phi(C_\text{1}+\Delta)$$
Team A win 3–2
$$P_\text{3} = \Phi(C_\text{3}+\Delta) - \Phi(C_\text{2}+\Delta)$$
Team A lose 2–3
$$P_\text{4} = \Phi(C_\text{4}+\Delta) - \Phi(C_\text{3}+\Delta)$$
Team A lose 1–3
$$P_\text{5} = \Phi(C_\text{5}+\Delta) - \Phi(C_\text{4}+\Delta)$$
Team A lose 0–3
$$P_\text{6} = 1- \Phi(C_\text{5}+\Delta)$$

where $\Phi(z)$ is the Cumulative distribution function of the Normal distribution, and $C_1,\ldots, C_5$ are the cut-points

- $C_1=-1.06$
- $C_2=-0.394$
- $C_3=0$
- $C_4=0.394$
- $C_5=1.06$

set so that $P_n$ is the probability of the outcome $n$ between two equal strength opponents (that is when $\Delta=0$), which is derived from the actual match results of the past decade.

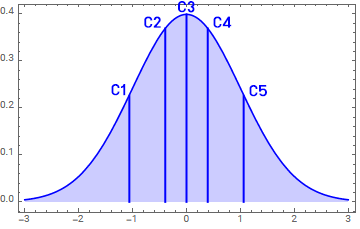
The cut-points in the normal distribution based on head-to-head between two equal strength teams, i.e $\Delta=0$.

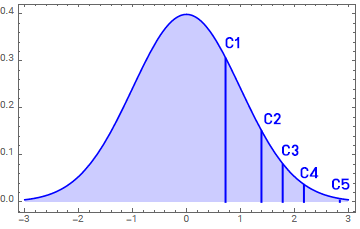
The cut-points in the normal distribution based on head-to-head between two teams after considering a strength difference, i.e $\Delta>0$.

The parameter $\Delta$ represents the scaled difference of the teams rankings

$$\Delta = {8(S_\text{teamA}-S_\text{teamB}) \over 1000}$$

where:

- $S_\text{teamA}$ – the team A's number of World Ranking scores before the game
- $S_\text{teamB}$ – the team B's number of World Ranking scores before the game

=== Examples ===
Before the match at the FIVB Volleyball World Championship (K = 50), Brazil (Team A) is ranked number 1 with a 415 WR score and Japan (Team B) is ranked number 11 with a 192 WR score.

Strength difference between Brazil and Japan
$$\Delta = {8(415-192) \over 1000} = 1.784$$

Expected match result

- $P_1 = \Phi(-1.060+1.784)$
- $P_2 = \Phi(-0.364+1.784) - \Phi(-1.060+1.784)$
- $P_3 = \Phi(0.000+1.784) - \Phi(-0.364+1.784)$
- $P_4 = \Phi(0.364+1.784) - \Phi(0.000+1.784)$
- $P_5 = \Phi(1.060+1.784) - \Phi(0.364+1.784)$
- $P_6 = 1 - \Phi(1.060+1.784)$

Expected match result for Brazil:

$$E = 76.5%(+2) + 15.2%(+1.5) + 4.5%(+1) + 2.2%(-1) + 1.2%(-1.5) + 0.2%(-2) = +1.76$$

Expected match result for Japan:

$$E = 0.2%(+2) + 1.2%(+1.5) + 2.2%(+1) + 4.5%(-1) + 15.2%(-1.5) + 76.5%(-2) = -1.76$$

World Ranking scores after Brazil win 3–0

World Ranking scores for Brazil:

$$S_\text{after} = \text{415} + {50(2-1.76) \over 8} = 416.5$$

World Ranking scores for Japan:

$$S_\text{after} = \text{192} + {50(-2+1.76) \over 8} = 190.5$$

World Ranking scores after Brazil win 3–1

World Ranking scores for Brazil:

$R=1.5$ and $E=1.76$, thus $R<E$ so

$$S_\text{after} = \text{415} + 0.01 = 415.01$$

World Ranking scores for Japan:

$R=-1.5$ and $E=-1.76$, thus $R>E$ so

$$S_\text{after} = \text{192} - 0.01 = 191.99$$

World Ranking scores after Brazil win 3–2

World Ranking scores for Brazil:

$R=1$ and $E=1.76$, thus $R<E$ so

$$S_\text{after} = \text{415} + 0.01 = 415.01$$

World Ranking scores for Japan:

$R=-1$ and $E=-1.76$, thus $R>E$ so

$$S_\text{after} = \text{192} - 0.01 = 191.99$$

World Ranking scores after Brazil lose 0–3

World Ranking scores for Brazil:

$$S_\text{after} = \text{415} + {50(-2-1.76) \over 8} = 391.5$$

World Ranking scores for Japan:

$$S_\text{after} = \text{192} + {50(2+1.76) \over 8} = 215.5$$

World Ranking scores after Brazil lose 1–3

World Ranking scores for Brazil:

$$S_\text{after} = \text{415} + {50(-1.5-1.76) \over 8} = 394.63$$

World Ranking scores for Japan:

$$S_\text{after} = \text{192} + {50(1.5+1.76) \over 8} = 212.38$$

World Ranking scores after Brazil lose 2–3

World Ranking scores for Brazil:

$$S_\text{after} = \text{415} + {50(-1-1.76) \over 8} = 397.75$$

World Ranking scores for Japan:

$$S_\text{after} = \text{192} + {50(1+1.76) \over 8} = 209.25$$

=== Inactive teams ===
Previously, inactive teams would lose 50 ranking points, but the inactivity sanction was removed in February 2026. Until 2025, teams were considered inactive after one year without participating in competitions eligible for ranking points. In April 2025, this was extended to two years.

Between 2020 and 2025, new teams with no match history entered the official ranking list with 50 ranking points when they played their first match eligible for ranking points (the original 100 points all teams received in 2019 minus the 50 points inactivity penalty). From 2026, new teams with no match history enter the ranking list with 0 ranking points.

== World and Continental Rankings ==
The five Continental Rankings filter the World Ranking points won and lost in matches played between teams from the same Continental Confederation.

- Intercontinental Tournaments – calculated in World Rankings, but some matches can be calculated in Continental Rankings
  - Olympic Games final and intercontinental qualification tournaments
  - FIVB World Championship final and intercontinental qualification tournaments
  - FIVB World Cup
  - FIVB Volleyball Nations League and Challenger Cup
  - some Continental Cups: Pan-America
  - some FIVB recognised international events, e.g. Pan American Games, Montreux Volley Masters
- Continental Tournaments – calculated in World and Continental Rankings
  - Olympic Games continental qualification tournaments
  - FIVB World Championship continental qualification tournaments
  - FIVB Challenger Cup qualification tournaments
  - Continental Championships: Asia (AVC), Africa (CAVB), Europe (CEV), North America (NORCECA), and South America (CSV)
  - some Continental Cups: Asia (both AVC Cup and Challenge Cup)
  - Zonal Championships, e.g. Eastern Asia, ASEAN, Central America
  - some FIVB recognised international events, e.g. African Games, Asian Games, European Games

Examples

Japan (Asian Volleyball Confederation) vs Italy (Confédération Européenne de Volleyball)
The points calculated in FIVB World Rankings.

Japan (Asian Volleyball Confederation) vs South Korea (Asian Volleyball Confederation)
The points calculated in FIVB World Rankings, and AVC Continental Rankings.

== FIVB World Rankings ==
=== Current men's top teams ===
Top 30 rankings as of 15 October 2026
Rank	Change	Team	Points
1	Steady	Poland	422.98
2	Steady	Italy	362.55
3	Steady	Russia	359.48
4	Steady	United States	358.6
5	Steady	Japan	352.7
6	Steady	Brazil	333.79
7	Steady	Slovenia	325.01
8	Steady	France	323.43
9	Steady	Bulgaria	285.01
10	Steady	Finland	263.92
11	Steady	Germany	262
12	Steady	Ukraine	255.62
13	Steady	Cuba	250.31
14	Steady	Argentina	245.7
15	Steady	Belgium	244.77
16	Steady	Canada	209.21
17	Steady	Turkey	237.64
18	Steady	Serbia	224.83
19	Steady	Iran	224.7
20	Steady	Czech Republic	214.91
21	Steady	Greece	176.97
22	Steady	Romania	173.46
23	Steady	Netherlands	171.34
24	Steady	Mexico	169.14
25	Steady	South Korea	163.1
26	Steady	Puerto Rico	153.6
27	Steady	Denmark	151.36
28	Steady	Chile	151.35
29	Steady	Egypt	150.49
30	Steady	Estonia	150.03
*Change from 1 October 2026

=== Current women's top teams ===
Top 30 rankings as of 2 October 2026
Rank	Change	Team	Points
1	Steady	Italy	468.93
2	Steady	Brazil	420.13
3	Steady	Turkey	411.83
4	▲3	United States	366.4
5	▼1	Poland	360.04
6	▼1	Japan	337.16
7	▼1	China	324.9
8	▲4	Canada	321.52
9	Steady	Serbia	316.36
10	▼2	Netherlands	296.82
11	Steady	Russia	285.21
12	▼2	Germany	256.45
13	▲5	Thailand	244.01
14	▼3	Dominican Republic	236
15	Steady	Czech Republic	233.14
16	▼2	Belgium	231.32
17	▼4	France	225.88
18	▲2	Slovenia	212.76
19	▲7	Sweden	207.42
20	▼3	Argentina	207.22
21	▼2	Mexico	201.88
22	▼6	Ukraine	178.55
23	▼1	Colombia	175.63
24	▼3	Kenya	174.85
25	▲5	Greece	174.2
26	▲1	Cuba	172.54
27	▼4	Puerto Rico	156.94
28	▲11	South Korea	156
29	▼4	Bulgaria	147.74
30	▲3	Switzerland	144.73
*Change from 24 May 2026

=== Historic men's leaders ===
For historical men's FIVB rankings from October 2005 to present.

=== Historic women's leaders ===
For historical women's FIVB rankings from September 2005 to present.

=== List of men's number one ranked nations ===
No.	Team	Start date	End date	Days	Total
1	Brazil	October 31, 2005	July 12, 2022	6098	6098
2	Poland	July 12, 2022	July 20, 2025	1104	1104
3	Italy	July 20, 2025	July 20, 2025	1	1
	Poland (2)	July 20, 2025	June 12, 2026	327	1431
	Italy (2)	June 12, 2026	June 24, 2026	12	13
	Poland (3)	June 24, 2026	November 30, 2026	159	1590

Last update: 30 November 2026

=== List of women's number one ranked nations ===
No.	Team	Start date	End date	Days	Total
1	China	October 30, 2005	December 1, 2006	397	397
2	Russia	December 1, 2006	November 30, 2007	364	364
3	Brazil	November 30, 2007	November 30, 2011	1461	1461
4	United States	November 30, 2011	September 30, 2013	670	670
	Brazil (2)	September 30, 2013	October 31, 2014	396	1857
	United States (2)	October 31, 2014	August 31, 2016	670	1340
	China (2)	August 31, 2016	October 31, 2018	791	1188
5	Serbia	October 31, 2018	September 30, 2019	334	334
	China (3)	September 30, 2019	May 27, 2021	605	1793
	United States (3)	May 27, 2021	October 5, 2022	496	1836
	Brazil (3)	October 5, 2022	October 9, 2022	4	1861
6	Italy	October 9, 2022	October 13, 2022	4	4
	Brazil (4)	October 13, 2022	October 15, 2022	2	1863
	Serbia (2)	October 15, 2022	July 17, 2023	275	609
7	Turkey	July 17, 2023	June 21, 2024	340	340
	Italy (2)	June 21, 2024	August 31, 2026	801	805

Last update: 31 August 2026

== See also ==
- FIVB Senior Continental Rankings
- FIVB Youth and Junior World Rankings
