= FIVB Senior Continental Rankings =

Volleyball ranking system

The FIVB Senior Continental Rankings is a ranking system for men's and women's national teams in volleyball. Divided to five continental confederations, the teams of the member nations of FIVB, volleyball's world governing body, are ranked based on their game results with the most successful teams being ranked highest. A points system is used, with points being awarded based on the results of all FIVB-recognised full international matches. The rankings are used in international competitions to define the seeded teams and arrange them in pools. Specific procedures for seeding and pooling are established by the FIVB in each competition's formula, but the method usually employed is the serpentine system.

== Calculation method ==
In 2019, FIVB collaborated with Hypercube Business Innovation of the Netherlands to design a new world ranking platform. The previous calculation method have a problem of circularity in the international volleyball calendar: only countries who participate in the major volleyball events can earn ranking points, whilst the number of ranking points of countries also determines seeding and access of teams for major events. This unfair principle does not contribute to the sporting and commercial quality of volleyball.

On 1 February 2020, the new ranking system will be implemented and will take into account all results from 1 January 2019. The system will be consistently updated to reflect the latest results and performances. The new World Ranking considers the match results between teams in the same continental confederations from all official competitions:

Tournament		Category	Organizer	$K$	Note
Olympic Games finals		Intercontinental	FIVB	45	only matches between teams in same confederations
Intercontinental Olympic Qualifying		Intercontinental	FIVB	25	only matches between teams in same confederations
Continental Olympic Qualifying	Asia	Continental	FIVB	25	co-sanctioned with AVC
Continental Olympic Qualifying	Africa	Continental	FIVB	25	co-sanctioned with CAVB
Continental Olympic Qualifying	Europe	Continental	FIVB	25	co-sanctioned with CEV
Continental Olympic Qualifying	S America	Continental	FIVB	25	co-sanctioned with CSV
Continental Olympic Qualifying	N America	Continental	FIVB	25	co-sanctioned with NORCECA
World Championship finals		Intercontinental	FIVB	45	only matches between teams in same confederations
World Championship Qualifying		Intercontinental	FIVB	22.5	only matches between teams in same confederations
Nations League		Intercontinental	FIVB	40	only matches between teams in same confederations
Challenger Cup		Intercontinental	FIVB	20	only matches between teams in same confederations
World Cup		Intercontinental	FIVB	35	only matches between teams in same confederations
African Championship finals		Continental	CAVB	35	
African Zonal Championship	North	Continental	CAVB	17.5	
African Zonal Championship	West A	Continental	CAVB	17.5	
African Zonal Championship	West B	Continental	CAVB	17.5	
African Zonal Championship	Central	Continental	CAVB	17.5	
African Zonal Championship	East	Continental	CAVB	17.5	
African Zonal Championship	South A	Continental	CAVB	17.5	
African Zonal Championship	South B	Continental	CAVB	17.5	
Asian Championship finals		Continental	AVC	35	
Asian Championship Qualifying		Continental	AVC	17.5	
Asian Challenge Cup		Continental	AVC	10	
Asian Zonal Championship	West	Continental	AVC	10	
Asian Zonal Championship	Central	Continental	AVC	10	
Asian Zonal Championship	East	Continental	AVC	10	
Asian Zonal Championship	ASEAN	Continental	AVC	10	
Asian Zonal Championship	Oceania	Continental	AVC	10	
EuroVolley finals		Continental	CEV	35	
EuroVolley Qualifying		Continental	CEV	17.5	
European League		Continental	CEV	10	
NORCECA Championship finals		Continental	NORCECA	35	
NORCECA Zonal Championship	N Central	Continental	NORCECA	17.5	
NORCECA Zonal Championship	Central	Continental	NORCECA	17.5	
NORCECA Zonal Championship	E Caribbean	Continental	NORCECA	17.5	
NORCECA Zonal Championship	Caribbean	Continental	NORCECA	17.5	
NORCECA Champions Cup		Continental	NORCECA	10	
Pan-American Volleyball Cup		Continental	NORCECA	10	co-sanctioned with CSV
South American Championship		Continental	CSV	35	

== AVC Continental Rankings ==
=== Top-ranked men's national teams ===
Top ranked AVC Men's Teams as of 1 October 2026
AVC	Rank	Change	Team	Points
1	5	▲1	Japan	352.7
2	19	Steady	Iran	224.7
3	25	▲1	South Korea	163.1
4	34	▲1	China	134.53
5	39	▼1	Pakistan	125.42
6	41	▲11	Australia	121.75
7	43	▼19	Qatar	120.64
8	45	▼1	Indonesia	112.92
9	46	▼3	Bahrain	109.71
10	48	▼3	India	103.98
11	52	▲7	Thailand	96.8
12	54	▲8	Chinese Taipei	88.92
13	58	Steady	Vietnam	82.42
14	69	▲9	Turkmenistan	63.93
15	70	▲9	Kyrgyzstan	63
16	73	▲3	Kazakhstan	61.9
17	74	▼13	Oman	61.52
18	75	▲5	Saudi Arabia	61.36
19	78	▲9	United Arab Emirates	58.47
20	81	▲2	Bangladesh	54.47
21	90	▲5	Sri Lanka	48.18
22	92	▲12	Philippines	46.19
23	93	▲13	Kuwait	46.03
24	94	▲16	Jordan	45.6
25	99	▲6	Iraq	43.98
26	103	▲11	Macau	31.87
27	104	▲18	Hong Kong	31.08
28	107	▲25	Mongolia	27.83
29	112	▲15	Uzbekistan	26.15
30	117	▲17	Lebanon	19
31	123	▲13	Cambodia	14.25
32	125	▲6	New Zealand	12.66
33	126	▼52	Guam	11.38
34	127	▼39	Papua New Guinea	10.27
35	128	Steady	Papua New Guinea	9.26
36	137	▼47	Cook Islands	1.22
*Change from 3 August 2026
Complete rankings at volleyballworld.com

=== Top-ranked women's national teams ===
Top ranked AVC Women's Teams as of 2 October 2026
AVC	Rank	Change	Team	Points
1	6	▼1	Japan	337.16
2	7	▼1	China	324.9
3	13	▲5	Thailand	244.01
4	28	▲11	South Korea	156
5	33	▼5	Vietnam	140.91
6	38	▼1	Chinese Taipei	125.23
7	40	▲4	Iran	120.75
8	44	▼9	Kazakhstan	113.84
9	51	▲23	Indonesia	87.24
10	56	▼9	Philippines	80.17
11	64	Steady	India	62.77
12	73	▼1	Singapore	53.17
13	85	▼9	Australia	37.68
14	87	▼24	Kyrgyzstan	36.43
15	88	▼10	Macau	36
16	93	▼5	Tajikistan	33.14
17	97	▼12	Hong Kong	25.04
18	99	▼6	Mongolia	22.55
19	100	Steady	Mongolia	21.61
20	108	▼16	Uzbekistan	15.23
*Change from 24 May 2026
Complete rankings at volleyballworld.com

== CAVB Continental Rankings ==
=== Top-ranked men's national teams ===
Top ranked CAVB Men's Teams as of 1 October 2026
CAVB	Rank	Change	Team	Points
1	29	▼2	Egypt	150.49
2	31	▲10	Tunisia	149.3
3	49	▲6	Cameroon	103.92
4	65	▼2	Kenya	67.9
5	67	▼14	Nigeria	66.41
6	72	▲54	Algeria	62.01
7	86	▲15	Libya	51.08
8	87	▼2	Niger	51.04
9	91	▲8	Senegal	46.93
10	100	▲24	Morocco	38.87
11	108	▲21	South Sudan	27.35
12	109	▲40	Burkina Faso	27.12
13	116	▼47	Benin	20.11
14	119	▲16	Burundi	16.66
15	120	▼50	Zambia	16.41
16	121	▼50	Zimbabwe	15.91
17	130	▼43	Namibia	6.64
18	131	▼38	Cape Verde	4
19	133	▼21	Gambia	3.46
20	136	▼47	Ivory Coast	1
*Change from 3 August 2026
Complete rankings at volleyballworld.com

=== Top-ranked women's national teams ===
Top ranked CAVB Women's Teams as of 2 October 2026
CAVB	Rank	Change	Team	Points
1	24	▼3	Kenya	174.85
2	39	▲26	Egypt	120.89
3	41	▲5	Cameroon	118.87
4	74	▲5	Algeria	51.3
*Change from 24 May 2026
Complete rankings at volleyballworld.com

== CEV Continental Rankings ==
=== Top-ranked men's national teams ===
Top ranked CEV Men's Teams as of 1 October 2026
CEV	Rank	Change	Team	Points
1	1	Steady	Poland	422.98
2	2	Steady	Italy	362.55
3	3	Steady	Russia	359.48
4	7	▼3	Slovenia	325.01
5	8	Steady	France	323.43
6	9	Steady	Bulgaria	285.01
7	10	▲6	Finland	263.92
8	11	▲1	Germany	262
9	12	▼1	Ukraine	255.62
10	15	▲2	Belgium	244.77
11	17	▼7	Turkey	237.64
12	18	▼5	Serbia	224.83
13	20	Steady	Czech Republic	214.91
14	21	▲2	Greece	176.97
15	22	▲11	Romania	173.46
16	23	▼2	Netherlands	171.34
17	27	▲4	Denmark	151.36
18	30	Steady	Estonia	150.03
19	32	▼7	Portugal	141.67
20	33	▼5	Switzerland	136.05
21	35	▼6	Israel	132.4
22	36	▼2	Spain	132.18
23	37	▲2	Sweden	132.02
*Change from 3 August 2026
Complete rankings at volleyballworld.com

=== Top-ranked women's national teams ===
Top ranked CEV Women's Teams as of 2 October 2026
CEV	Rank	Change	Team	Points
1	1	Steady	Italy	468.93
2	3	Steady	Turkey	411.83
3	5	▼1	Poland	360.04
4	9	Steady	Serbia	316.36
5	10	▼2	Netherlands	296.82
6	12	▼2	Germany	256.45
7	15	Steady	Czech Republic	233.14
8	16	▼2	Belgium	231.32
9	17	▼4	France	225.88
10	18	▲2	Slovenia	212.76
11	19	▲7	Sweden	207.42
12	22	▼6	Ukraine	178.55
13	25	▲5	Greece	174.2
14	29	▼4	Bulgaria	147.74
15	30	▲3	Switzerland	144.73
16	31	▼7	Romania	142.86
17	32	▲4	Finland	141.36
18	34	▼5	Hungary	139.04
19	35	▼1	Slovakia	136.31
*Change from 24 May 2026
Complete rankings at volleyballworld.com

== CSV Continental Rankings ==
=== Top-ranked men's national teams ===
Top ranked CSV Men's Teams as of 1 October 2026
CSV	Rank	Change	Team	Points
1	6	▲1	Brazil	333.79
2	14	Steady	Argentina	245.7
3	28	▲4	Chile	151.35
4	42	▲9	Colombia	120.97
5	56	▼8	Venezuela	87.09
6	105	▲15	Peru	30.89
*Change from 3 August 2026
Complete rankings at volleyballworld.com

=== Top-ranked women's national teams ===
Top ranked CSV Women's Teams as of 2 October 2026
CSV	Rank	Change	Team	Points
1	2	Steady	Brazil	420.13
2	20	▼3	Argentina	207.22
3	23	▼1	Colombia	175.63
4	45	▼7	Peru	101.43
5	63	▲23	Venezuela	62.96
6	65	▲1	Chile	62.31
*Change from 24 May 2026
Complete rankings at volleyballworld.com

== NORCECA Continental Rankings ==
=== Top-ranked men's national teams ===
Top ranked NORCECA Men's Teams as of 1 October 2026
NORCECA	Rank	Change	Team	Points
1	4	▲1	United States	358.6
2	13	▲2	Cuba	250.31
3	16	▲2	Canada	209.21
4	24	▲13	Mexico	169.14
5	26	▼4	Puerto Rico	153.6
6	50	▼4	Dominican Republic	103.28
7	59	▲8	Dominica	77.14
8	62	▲2	Saint Lucia	73.67
9	63	▲3	Belize	73.55
10	64	▲4	Barbados	72.33
11	68	▲5	Jamaica	65.79
12	76	▲8	Nicaragua	60.27
13	88	▲29	Guatemala	49
14	97	▲18	Grenada	44.82
15	98	▲15	El Salvador	44.48
16	101	▲17	Bahamas	38.85
17	102	▲17	Bahamas	38.1
18	114	▲19	Suriname	20.68
19	118	▲3	Trinidad and Tobago	17.46
*Change from 3 August 2026
Complete rankings at volleyballworld.com

=== Top-ranked women's national teams ===
Top ranked NORCECA Women's Teams as of 2 October 2026
NORCECA	Rank	Change	Team	Points
1	4	▲3	United States	366.4
2	8	▲4	Canada	321.52
3	14	▼3	Dominican Republic	236
4	21	▼2	Mexico	201.88
5	26	▲1	Cuba	172.54
6	27	▼4	Puerto Rico	156.94
7	49	▲1	Bermuda	93.5
8	53	▼4	Saint Lucia	85.9
9	54	▲2	Netherlands Antilles	83.52
10	57	▼6	Barbados	79.9
11	59	▼4	Jamaica	76.7
12	60	▼8	Nicaragua	71
13	61	▼1	Honduras	70.68
14	66	▲1	Guadeloupe	59.38
15	69	▲2	Suriname	55.06
16	70	▼13	Trinidad and Tobago	54.18
17	71	▼10	Costa Rica	53.95
18	76	▼1	El Salvador	48.34
19	78	▼1	Bahamas	44.91
20	96	▼14	Grenada	26.62
*Change from 24 May 2026
Complete rankings at volleyballworld.com
