= World cup =

International sports competition where competitors represent their nation

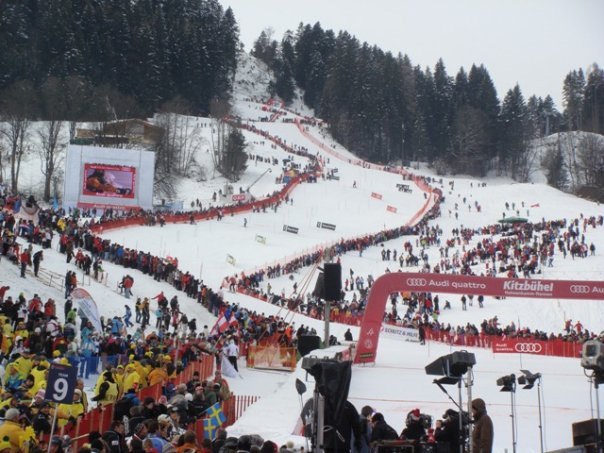
The Alpine Skiing World Cup consists of a series of competitions where results are counted together.

A world cup is a global sporting competition in which the participant entities – usually international teams or individuals representing their countries – compete for the title of world champion. The event most associated with the name is the FIFA World Cup for association football, which dates back to 1930. Since then there have been a number of sporting events labeled "world cup", such as the ICC Men's Cricket World Cup, the ICC Men's T20 World Cup, the Rugby World Cup, Rugby League World Cup, Basketball World Cup, and the Hockey World Cup.

A world cup is generally, though not always, considered the premier competition in its sport, with the victor attaining the highest honour in that sport and being able to lay claim to the title of their sport's best. In some sports, however, the Olympic title carries at least as much prestige, while other sports such as diving and artistic gymnastics differentiate between their premier competitions, such as World Championships and Olympic Games, and their "World Cup", which is organized as a smaller scale but high-level showcase event with small elite fields.

== Differences between world cup and world championships ==
Many sports governing bodies prefer the title "world championship" or a related term; some even organize both a world cup and a world championship with different rules. Usually, these competitions take one of two forms: a short periodic competition or a year-long series of meetings. Most frequently, many sports have both a World Cup (usually consisting of multiple events in a season), and a world championship (usually a single event).

Sport	World Cup	World Championships
Alpine skiing	FIS Alpine Ski World Cup	FIS Alpine World Ski Championships
Archery	Archery World Cup	World Archery Championships
Artistic gymnastics	Artistic Gymnastics World Cup	World Artistic Gymnastics Championships
Athletics	Athletics World Cup	World Athletics Championships
Biathlon	Biathlon World Cup	Biathlon World Championships
Chess	FIDE World Cup	World Chess Championship
Cross-country skiing	FIS Cross-Country World Cup	FIS Nordic World Ski Championships
Curling	Curling World Cup	World Curling Championships
Cricket	Cricket World Cup, T20 World Cup	World Test Championship
Cycling	UCI Road World Cup	UCI World Championships
Diving	World Aquatics Diving World Cup	World Aquatics Championships
Fencing	Fencing World Cup	World Fencing Championships
Freestyle skiing	FIS Freestyle Ski World Cup	FIS Freestyle World Ski Championships
Ice hockey	World Cup of Hockey	Ice Hockey World Championships
Luge	Luge World Cup	FIL World Luge Championships
Nordic combined	FIS Nordic Combined World Cup	FIS Nordic World Ski Championships
Rhythmic gymnastics	Rhythmic Gymnastics World Cup	Rhythmic Gymnastics World Championships
Ski jumping	FIS Ski Jumping World Cup	FIS Nordic World Ski Championships
Speed skating	ISU Speed Skating World Cup	World Speed Skating Championships
Volleyball	FIVB Volleyball World Cup	FIVB Volleyball World Championship

A periodic world cup or world championship usually takes the form of a knockout tournament (possibly with an initial group stage). This is held over a number of days or weeks, with the entrants eventually being whittled down to two, and the tournament culminating in a world cup final. The winner(s) take the title of World Champion(s) and hold it until the next time the event is held (usually one, two, or four years later). This format is most common in team sports. In individual sports however, holding the title can vary in terms of duration, as it is dependent on the timing of the next scheduled individual contest between the defending champion and a challenger.

As well, some sports host a bronze medal game, with the third and fourth place competitors competing for bronze, respectively.

== Season-long format ==
A contrasting concept, popular in individual sports, is a year-long competition with several meetings over its course. In this format, victory at an individual meeting earns a number of points, and, usually, a number of positions below also score points inversely related to their position. Contestants accumulate a number of points over the course of the year (often "season") and their cumulative total after all meetings have been concluded determines the World Champion or, simply, World Cup winner. The winner is then considered the champion until the next World Cup.

== See also ==
- List of world sports championships, including those styled as "World Cups"
- List of world cups
- World Series (disambiguation)
