= Sports titles system in Albania =

The Sports titles system of Albania was based on a government decree of 1967, which replaced prior legislation on sports titles as recognized by the Albanian Government. It was based on government decree Nr.4259, as of 11 April 1967 (On the creation of titles Merited Master of Sports, Master of Sport, Champion of the People's Republic of Albania and Distinguished Figure in Sport).

== Athletes ==
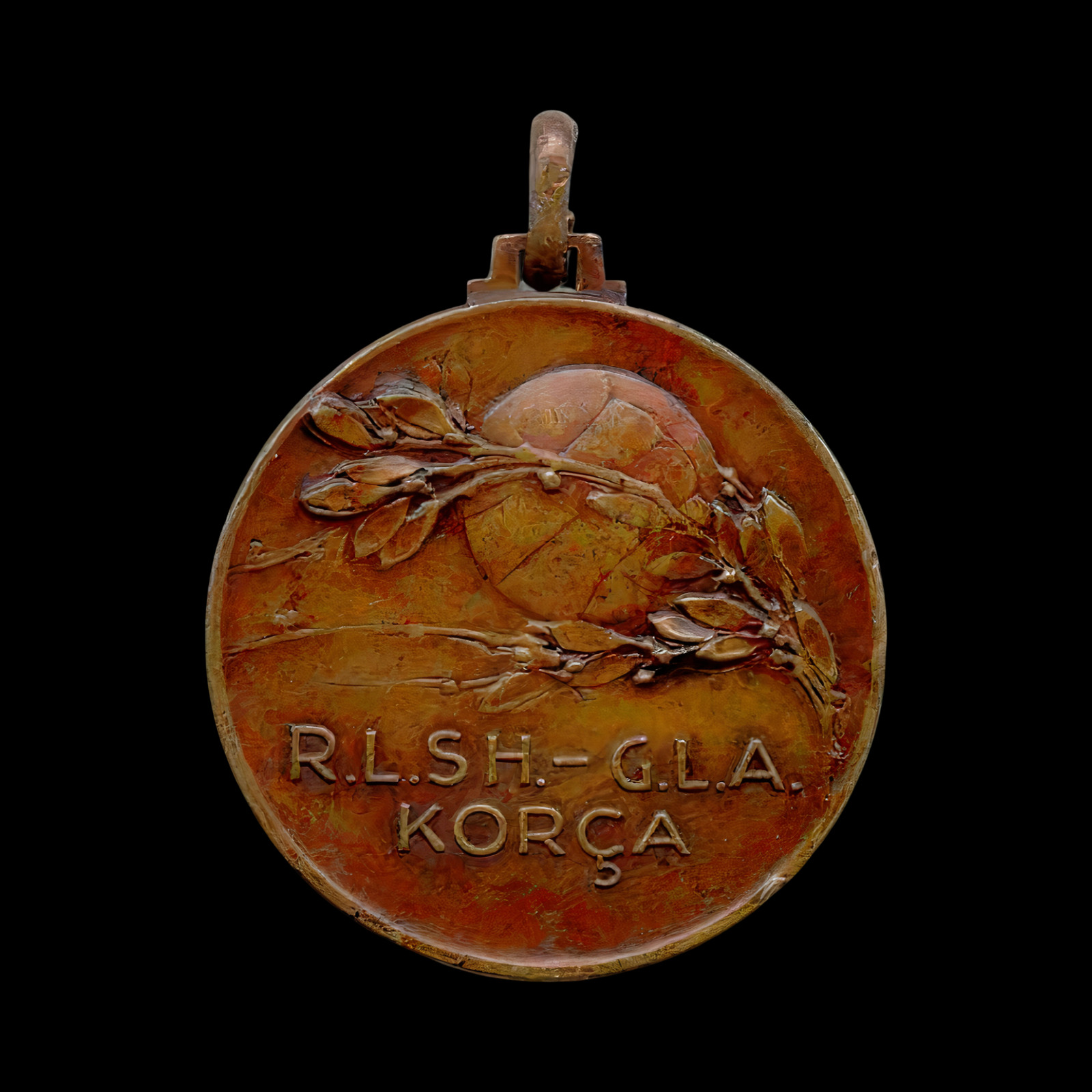
Football medal, Korçë (1923)

The classification was established in Nr.4259, on 11 April 1967, and replaced the law number 3957 dated 18 January 1965 that gave the Distinguished athlete title, and instituted the four following titles:

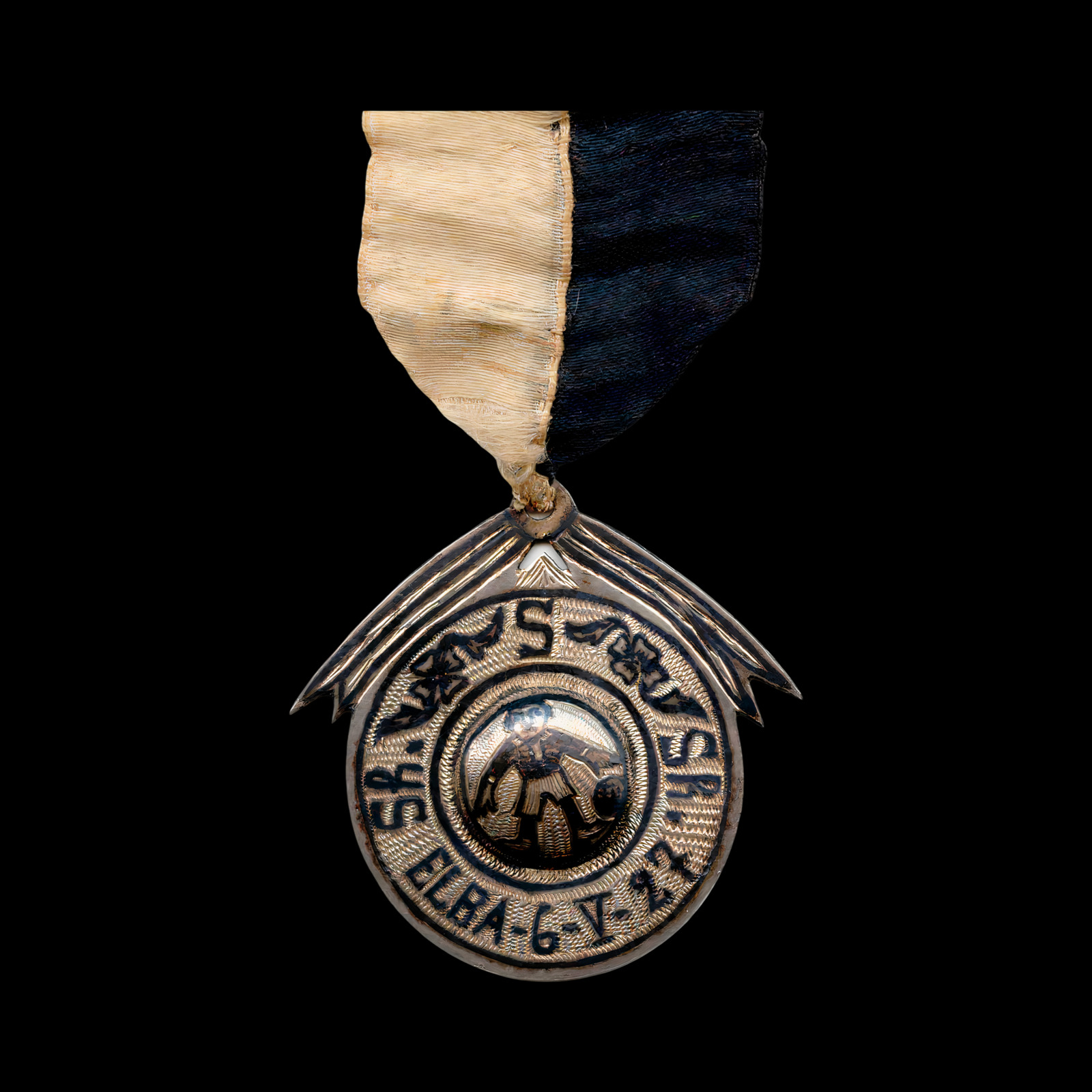
Football medal, Elbasan (1927)

- Merited Master of Sports (Albanian: Mjeshtër i merituar i sportit), equates to masters that have made valuable contributions to the sport and influenced other athletes
- Master of Sport (Albanian: Mjeshtër i sportit), equates to athletes that have distinguished themselves in high results.
- National Champion (Albanian: Kampion i Republikës Popullore të Shqipërisë), given to all teams and athletes with best results in a sports season.
- Distinguished Sports Executive (Albanian: Kuadër i dalluar në sport), equates to professional executives with high merits in the sports education for a long period.

This system was popular in Albania and was copied from the Soviet system of the Unified Sports Classification System of the USSR and Russia, as well as from Soviet satellite states and was used in Bulgaria, Czechoslovakia, East Germany, Poland, and Romania until the breakup of the USSR in 1991. Russia continued the system, and former Soviet republics Belarus, Moldova, Kazakhstan, Kyrgyzstan, Tajikistan, Ukraine and Uzbekistan also maintain a similar or identical ranking system.

== See also ==
- Orders, decorations and medals of Albania
- Unified Sports Classification System of the USSR and Russia
- Unified Sports Classification of Ukraine
