= World Team Cup (disambiguation) =

World Team Cup is a professional men's tennis tournament for nation-based teams.

World Team Cup or Team World Cup or variant, may also refer to:

- Speedway World Team Cup, a motorcycle speedway tournament for nation-based teams of pro riders
- ITF World Team Cup (wheelchair tennis), a parasport tournament for wheelchair tennis
- ITTF World Team Cup (ping pong), the nation-based team competition element of the Table Tennis World Cup
- FIE Team World Cup, the nation-based team competition element of the Fencing World Cup
- FIL Team World Cup, the nation-based team competition element of the Luge World Cup

== See also ==
- World Cup (disambiguation), which includes lists team-based World Cups
- World Cup Trophy (disambiguation)
