= World Cup Trophy =

World Cup Trophy may refer to:

- Cricket World Cup Trophy
- FIFA World Cup Trophy in association football
- Naismith Trophy for the FIBA World Cup in basketball
- Webb Ellis Cup, the trophy of the Rugby World Cup (rugby union)

== See also ==
- List of world sports championships
- World Cup (disambiguation)
- World Team Cup (disambiguation)
