= World Series (disambiguation) =

The World Series is the championship series of Major League Baseball. It may also refer to:

== Baseball and softball ==
=== Professional baseball ===
- Triple-A World Series, a contest in Minor League Baseball
- Junior World Series, a former championship in Minor League Baseball, played from 1904–1975
- Caribbean World Series
- Negro World Series, a post-season baseball tournament which was held from 1924–1927 and from 1942–1948 between the champions of the Negro leagues, matching the mid-western winners against their east coast counterparts

=== Amateur baseball and softball ===
- Men's College World Series, an annual baseball tournament held in Omaha, Nebraska that is the culmination of the NCAA Division I Baseball Championship, which determines the NCAA Division I college baseball champion
- Women's College World Series, the final portion of the NCAA Division I Softball Championship for college softball in the United States
- Pony League World Series, a baseball tournament for children aged 14 and under
- Little League World Series, a baseball tournament for children aged 11 to 12 years old
- Little League Softball World Series
- Intermediate League World Series
- Junior League World Series
- Junior League World Series (softball), a softball tournament for girls aged between 13 and 14
- Senior League World Series
- Big League World Series

=== Baseball video games ===
- World Series Baseball for the Sega Genesis
- World Series Baseball 2K2 for the Xbox
- Intellivision World Series Baseball, a baseball sports game (1983), designed by Don Daglow and Eddie Dombrower and published by Mattel for the Intellivision Entertainment Computer System

== Aquatic sports ==
- FINA Diving World Series
- FINA Marathon Swim World Series
- FINA Artistic Swimming World Series (for synchronized swimming)

== Auto racing ==
- Champ Car World Series
- World Series by Renault, formerly called the World Series by Nissan

== Card games ==
- World Series of Blackjack, a televised blackjack tournament created and produced by the cable network GSN
- World Series of Poker, a world-renowned series of poker tournaments held annually in Las Vegas and, since 2005, sponsored by Harrah's Entertainment

== Cricket ==
- World Series Cricket, held from 1977–1979
- World Series Cup, held from 1979–1996

== Indoor sports ==
- World Series of Backgammon
- Heavyweight World Series, a series of professional boxing matches held in 1986 and 1987
- Netball World Series, an international netball competition that was contested for the first time in October 2009
- World Series of Darts (2006 tournament), a Professional Darts Corporation event in 2006
- World Series of Darts, a Professional Darts Corporation series starting in 2013
- World Series of Beer Pong, the largest Beer pong tournament in the world in number of participants and cash prizes offered
- World Series of Boxing (WSB) is an international boxing competition for amateur boxers
- World Series of Snooker, an international snooker tournament series

== Other contests ==
- ATP World Series, original name for the ATP International Series in men's tennis
- World Club Series, annual rugby league test series between clubs from the Australasian National Rugby League and Super League
- World Rugby Sevens Series, a series of men's rugby tournaments
- World Rugby Women's Sevens Series, a series of women's rugby tournaments
- World Series of Football (1902–03), a series of football games played indoors at New York's Madison Square Garden in 1902 and 1903
- World Series of Football (1950), the unified championship of the National Football League and All-America Football Conference
- NEC World Series of Golf, a former PGA Tour event
- World Series of Golf (unofficial event), an annual golf competition
- The World Series of Pop Culture, a VH1 game show tournament program sponsored by Alltel Wireless, based on Entertainment Weekly's Pop Culture Quiz
- World Series of Soccer, initially a series of senior international soccer matches held by USSF between 1991 and 1994
- World Series Wrestling
- WUFA World Series

== Miscellaneous ==
- World Series of Rock, a concert series
- World Series of Country Music Proudly Presents Stock Car Racing's Entertainers of the Year, a 1985 concept album featuring 22 NASCAR drivers

== See also ==
- List of world sports championships
- World championship, the top achievement for any sport or contest
- World Championship Series (disambiguation)
- List of world cups
