= Little World Cup =

Little World Cup may describe several tournaments in association football or derived sports:

- Small Club World Cup, held in Venezuela, 1952–75
- Taça das Nações, in Brazil in 1964
- Brazil Independence Cup, or Minicopa, in 1972.
- 1980 Mundialito, in Uruguay
- Mundialito (women), 1981–88
- World Cup of Masters, or Mundialito de Seniors, over-35s, 1987–95
- Mundialito de Futebol de Praia, beach soccer, since 1994
- Futsal Mundialito, since 1994
- Tournoi de France (1997)

== See also ==
- Mundialito (disambiguation)
- World Cup (disambiguation)
