= Distinguished Figure in Sport =

Sports title of the People's Socialist Republic of Albania

- Native name: Kuadër i dalluar në sport
- Type: Honorary title
- Awarded for: Distinguished activity in the development and organization of physical education and sport.
- Country: People's Socialist Republic of Albania
- Presented by: Ministry of Education and Culture
- Eligibility: Professionals and volunteers in physical education and sport
- Status: Discontinued
- Established: 11 April 1967

The Distinguished Figure in Sport (Albanian: Kuadër i dalluar në sport) was an honorary title of the People's Socialist Republic of Albania. It recognized professionals and volunteers for outstanding contributions to the development of physical education and sport.

== History ==
The title was instituted by Decree No. 4259 on 11 April 1967, as part of Albania's system of state distinctions. It was awarded in a single class to professionals and volunteers who had distinguished themselves in physical education, particularly through their contribution to the younger generation. The award also recognized notable contributions to the development and organization of physical education and sport.

== Insignia ==
The insignia was a circular bronze medal, approximately 28 mm in diameter. The obverse featured the inscription KUADËR I DALLUAR / NË FIZKULTURË E SPORT / R.P.SH., enclosed by two concentric laurel wreaths, with a laurel branch at the center. The reverse was left plain.

The medal was attached to a rectangular metal suspension bar measuring 15 × 7 mm and finished with red enamel.

== See also ==
- Orders, decorations, and medals of Albania
- Sports titles system in Albania
- Master of Sport
- Champion of the People's Republic of Albania
