= Unified Sports Classification of Ukraine =

Unified Sports Classification of Ukraine (Ukrainian: Єдина спортивна класифікація України) is a standard document in the sphere of physical culture and sports that defines order, conditions, and requirements that are necessary for awarding sports titles and sports degrees in Ukraine. The classification takes roots from the Soviet Unified Sports Classification System that was established in 1935. Note: in the article any references in the masculine form refer to both genders.

== Titles and degrees ==
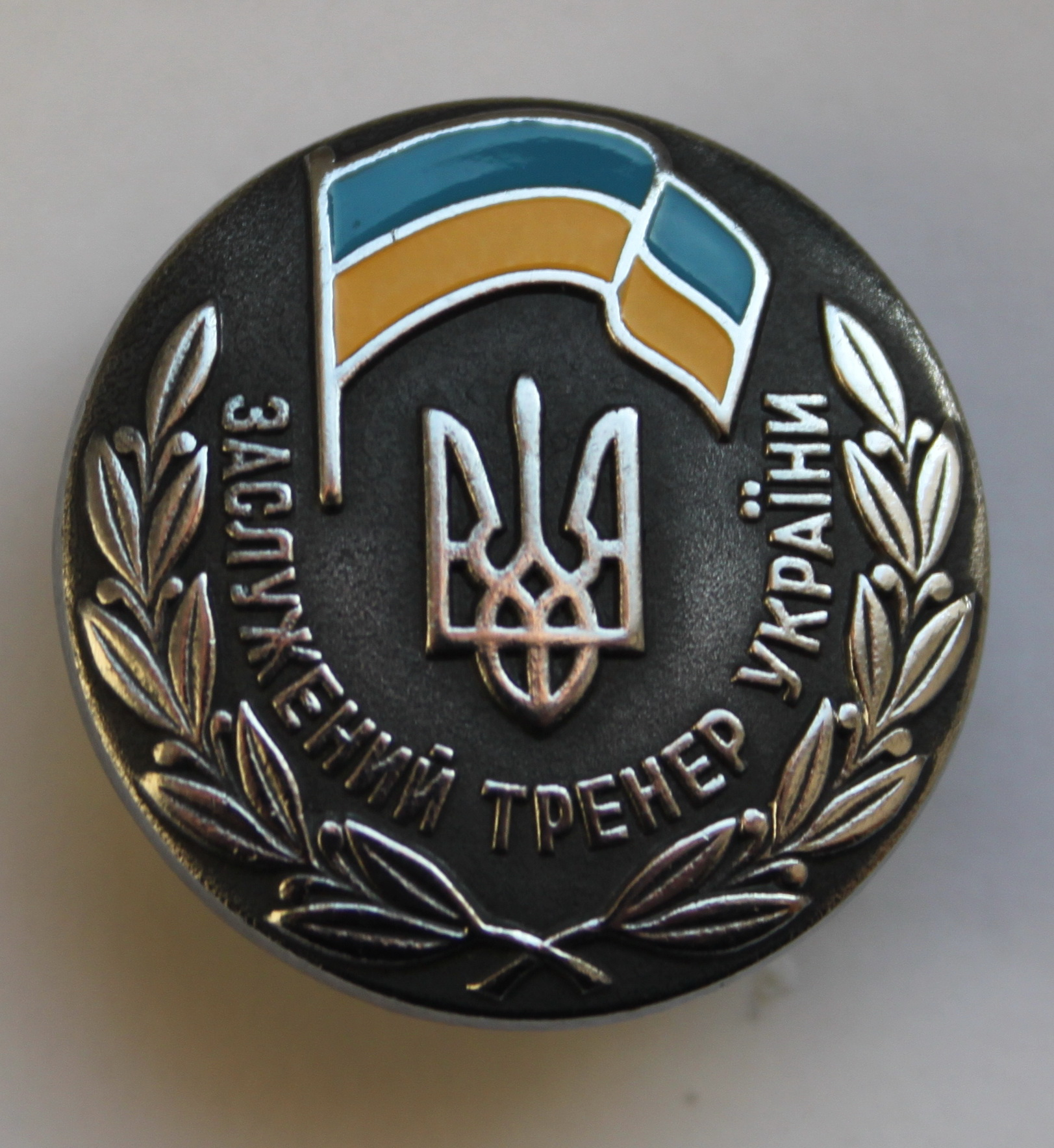
Merited Coach

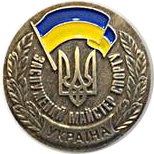
Merited Master of Sports

=== Titles ===
All titles are awarded by the order of the central body of executive power in physical culture and sports (a ministry or a state agency).

==== Highest honors ====
- Merited Coach of Ukraine
- Merited Master of Sports of Ukraine

==== Masters of Sports ====
- Master of Sports of Ukraine, World Class
- Grandmaster of Ukraine (board games, e.g. chess)
- Master of Sports of Ukraine

=== Degrees ===
Candidate in Masters of Sports of Ukraine and the I degree are awarded by chairmen of Regional State Administrations (on a rare occasions by leaders of a local government). II and III degrees are awarded by leaders of a local government. All junior degrees are awarded in sports schools, sports clubs, and specialized sports institutions.

- Candidate in Masters of Sports of Ukraine
- I, II, III degrees
- I, II, III junior degrees

Note: in case of a lifetime suspension (disqualification) for trespassing the anti-doping rules (Use of performance-enhancing drugs in sport) sportsmen are stripped of their title by the order of central body of executive power in physical culture and sports.

=== Order of awarding ===
All titles (highest honors and masters of sports) are awarded by a central body of executive power (ministry or state agency) for Physical Culture and Sports on proposal from state regional administrations.

Candidate and first degree are assigned by a state regional administration, but if necessary by any local government as well.

Degrees second and third are assigned by a local government.

All junior degrees are assigned by sports clubs and schools.

== Conditions for consideration ==
=== Top awards ===
The title of Merited Coach of Ukraine is exclusive and awarded to coaches, usually citizens of Ukraine, for high special merits to prepare highly qualified sportsmen in individual and team sports.

The title of Merited Master of Sports of Ukraine is the top earned title for sportsmen that is awarded usually to citizens of Ukraine in individual or team sports.

=== Other ===
Other sport titles and degrees are awarded to sportsmen when they complete qualifying norms and requirements. For sportsmen who are not citizens of Ukraine, the decision to award a sports title is reviewed by a special commission. A participant of sports games must play in no less than 50% of the competition calendar and be included in a start protocol.

All titles are awarded to sportsmen and coaches for life. Sports degrees in individual sports are awarded for two years, while in sports games for four years. A degree award may be extended when the norm and requirements for it were repeated.

=== Participating judges ===
Lower sports titles and degrees are awarded under condition if a collegiate of judges is present:

- Master of Sports of Ukraine, World Class - number of judges and their qualification is specified in the rules of competition for a particular sport
- Master of Sports of Ukraine - three judges of the National or International categories
- Candidate in Masters of Sports of Ukraine - three judges of no lower than the first category
- I, II degrees - three judges of no lower than the second category
- other sports degrees - three judges of no lower than the third category

== Competition ranking ==
1. - Olympic Games, Winter Olympic Games, Paralympic Games, Deaflympics, World Games
2. - World championships or World Cups, European Championships or European Cups, Grands Prix, World Chess Olympiad, World Universiade, other international competitions
3. - Championship of Ukraine, Cup competition of Ukraine, other official All-Ukrainian competitions for other than junior age group (Junior (athletics))
4. - Championship of Ukraine, Cup competition of Ukraine, other official All-Ukrainian competitions for the junior age group
5. - Championship of regions, clubs and societies, and zonal competitions for other than junior age group
6. - Championship of regions, clubs and societies, and zonal competitions for junior age group

== See also ==
- Ready for Labour and Defence of the USSR
- Unified Sports Classification System of the USSR and Russia
- National Olympic Committee of Ukraine
