= Master of Sport (Albania) =

Sports title of the People's Socialist Republic of Albania

- Native name: Mjeshtër Sporti
- Type: Sports title and medal
- Awarded for: High sporting results meeting the standards and requirements of the national unified sports classification system.
- Country: People's Socialist Republic of Albania
- Eligibility: Athletes
- Status: Discontinued
- Established: 11 April 1967
- Ribbon bar

Master of Sport (Albanian: Mjeshtër Sporti) was a sports title and associated medal of the People's Socialist Republic of Albania awarded to athletes who achieved high results that fulfilled the standards and criteria of the country's unified sports classification system.

== History ==
The title was established by Decree No. 4259 of 11 April 1967, issued by the Presidium of the People's Assembly pursuant to Article 58, point 6, of the Constitution. The same decree also instituted three other sporting distinctions: Merited Master of Sport, Champion of the People's Republic of Albania and Distinguished Figure in Sport.

Master of Sport was conferred on athletes from various disciplines who attained high-level results and fulfilled the standards and requirements of Albania's unified sports classification system. Eligibility for the title was determined by the performance criteria established under this system.

== Medal and certificate ==
Recipients were presented with a certificate and the corresponding medal. The design and specifications of the medal were determined by the Ministry of Education and Culture. The decree distinguished Master of Sport from the higher title "Merited Master of Sport" in the form of recognition provided.

== Notable recipients ==
- Agim Fagu – basketball (1967)
- Afërdita Tusha – shooting (1967)
- Gani Mezini – gymnastics
- Fatos Pilkati – shooting (1972)
- Nako Saraçi – football
- Andrea Pavli – gymnastics
- Xhulieta Muço
- Elida Xhindi – swimming
- Niko Shtrepi – shooting
- Kreshnik Çipi – football
- Alfred Zijai – football
- Yllka Hela – gymnastics
- Mbarime Belaj – gymnastics
- Afërdita Aliaj
- Kastriot Malaj
- Ilir Kallfa – shooting
- Grigor Perikliu – football
- Petrit Hasekiu – football
- Agim Hasekiu – football
- Agron Stringa – football
- Hyqmet Krati – football
- Fadil Kovaçi – football
- Petrit Kallajxhiu – football
- Kostandin Xhani – football
- Xhaferr Turhani – football
- Naim Dylgjeri – football
- Muhamet Halilaj – football

== See also ==
- Orders, decorations, and medals of Albania
- Sports titles system in Albania
- Champion of the People's Republic of Albania
- Distinguished Figure in Sport
