= Mundialito =

Mundialito may refer to:

- 1980 Mundialito, international football tournament held in 1980 in Uruguay
- Mundialito (women), international football tournament held from 1981 to 1988
- BSWW Mundialito, international beach soccer tournament between national teams
- Mundialito de Clubes, international beach soccer tournament between clubs
- Futsal Mundialito, futsal tournament
- Small Club World Cup, international club football tournament held in Venezuela between 1952 and 1975

== See also ==
- Little World Cup (disambiguation)
