= Unified Sports Classification System of Russia =

Document outlining physical education requirements

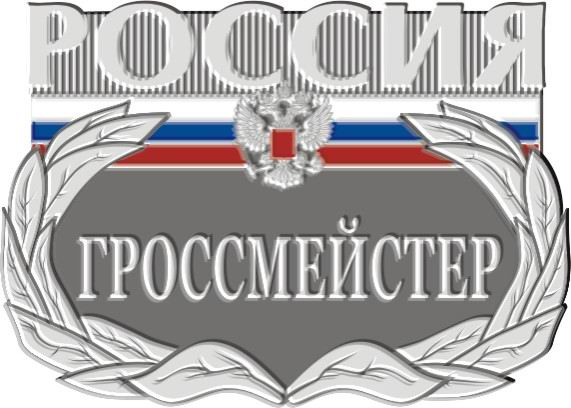
Badge of the Master of Sports of International Class title

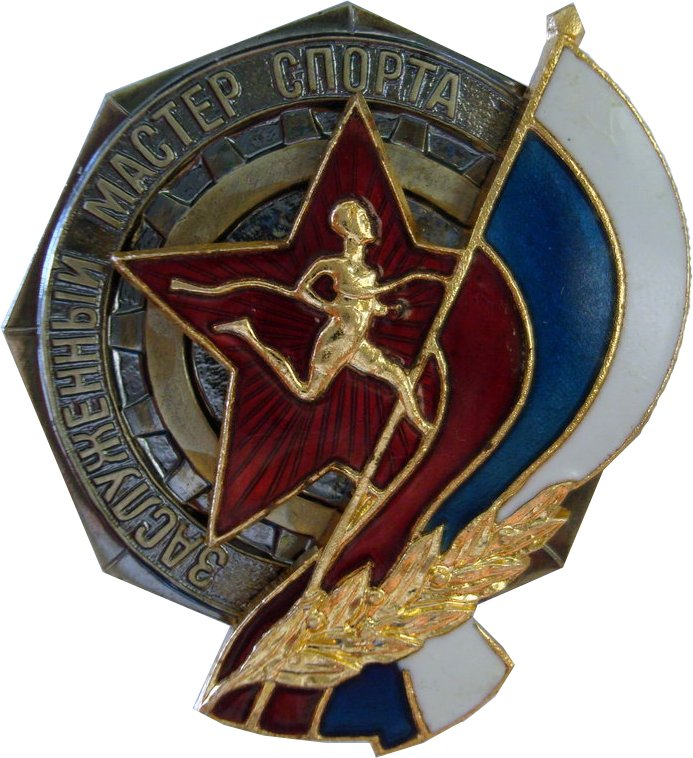
Badge of the Merited Master of Sport of Russia title. Awarded from 1992 to 2007

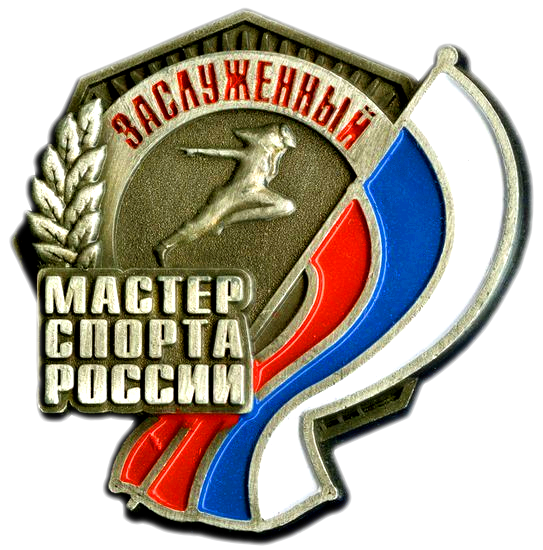
Badge of the Merited Master of Sport of Russia title. Awarded since 2007

Unified All-Russian Sports Classification (Russian: Единая всероссийская спортивная классификация) is a system which regulates the Russian physical education system requirements for both athletes and coaches.

== History ==
In the Soviet period Unified Sports Classification System of the USSR (Russian: Единая Всесоюзная спортивная классификация) existed. Several Warsaw Pact states developed their own versions of the system. Russia, other post-Soviet republics, and allied states have continued their own versions of the system.

The first Unified Sports Classification System in modern Russia was introduced in 1994, it was designed for the period until 1996. For summer sports, the USCS 2014–2017 is in effect, for winter sports the USCS 2015–2018.

The USCS is the only regulatory document that determines the procedure for assigning official sports titles and ranks and the requirements for athletes applying for these titles. The USCS is formed in accordance with the All-Russian Register of Sports and the list of sports recognized by the Ministry of Sports of the Russian Federation.

The USCS defines the standards that an athlete must meet to receive a title. The EVSK also establishes the conditions under which these standards must be met: the level of competition, the qualifications of judges, the level of opponents. The requirements are set individually for each sport, taking into account both its specifics and the level of development of this sport in the Russian Federation.

The USCS is developed and adopted for a period of four years. Several editions of the USCS may be in effect simultaneously if they define requirements for different sports. A new sports title called Merited Master of Sport of Russia was created by the Russian government in 2007 to replace the previous one.

== Athletes ==
The classification was established in 1935 and was based on separate classifications, which existed for several sports disciplines before. Starting in 1949, it was revised every four years, the period, which corresponded to the Olympic cycle, to reflect new standards for the physical training. The document contained test standards, principles and conditions, necessary for the conferment of sports ranks and titles, for all sports, cultivated in the USSR. As of the 1970s, there were following ranks for athletes of the USSR (listed in descending order of value):

- Merited Master of Sport of the USSR, (Russian: заслуженный мастер спорта СССР, abbreviated as "змс", sometimes translated as Honoured Master of Sport of the USSR), equates to international champion who has made valuable contributions to the sport
- Master of Sport of the USSR, International Class (Russian: мастер спорта СССР международного класса; abbreviated as "мсмк"), equates to international champion
- Master of Sport of the USSR (Russian: мастер спорта СССР; abbreviated as "мс"), equates to national champion
- Candidate for Master of Sport of the USSR (Russian: кандидат в мастера спорта СССР; abbreviated as "кмс"), equates to nationally ranked player
- First-Class Sportsman (Russian: спортсмен 1-го разряда), equates to regional champion
- Second-Class Sportsman (Russian: спортсмен 2-го разряда), equates to state champion
- Third-Class Sportsman (Russian: спортсмен 3-го разряда), equates to city champion
- First-Class Junior Sportsman (Russian: спортсмен 1-го юношеского разряда)
- Second-Class Junior Sportsman (Russian: спортсмен 2-го юношеского разряда)
- Third-Class Junior Sportsman (Russian: спортсмен 3-го юношеского разряда)

Each of these titles was awarded only for results on the official competitions. Athletes who qualified for the rank were awarded a badge with serial number.

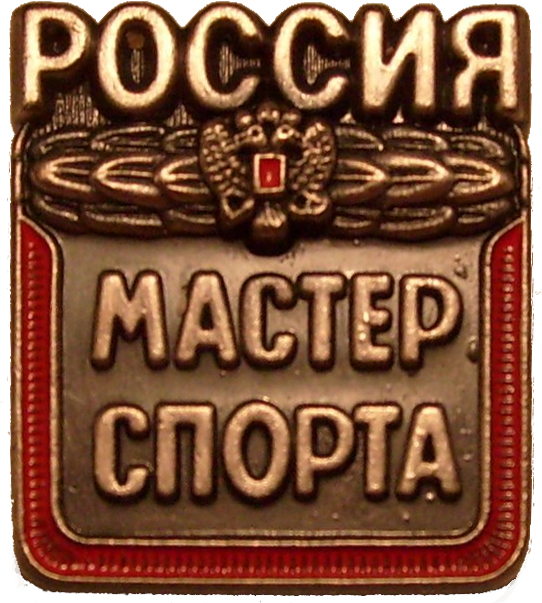
Badge of the Master of Sports of Russia title

This system was popular among Soviet satellite states and was used in Bulgaria, Czechoslovakia, East Germany, Poland, and Romania until the breakup of the USSR in 1991. Russia continued the system, and former Soviet republics Belarus, Moldova, Kazakhstan, Kyrgyzstan, Tajikistan, Ukraine and Uzbekistan also maintain a similar or identical ranking system. In Mongolia, Honored Athletes (Mongolian: гавьяат тамирчин) have been recognized since 1960. In Albania, the Sports titles system was established in 1967.

=== Non-Soviet Masters of Sport ===
The title of Merited Master of Sport of the USSR was awarded to a select number of foreigners.

On 30 January 1952, the title Merited Master of Sport of the USSR was awarded to Agustín Gómez Pagóla, who was born in Spain and started to play football there, but moved to the USSR during the Spanish Civil War in 1937, and played for Torpedo Moscow in 1947–1954, being the team captain in 1951–1953.

In 1972, to mark the 50th anniversary of the establishment of the Soviet Union, this title was awarded to the following prominent athletes from Soviet-aligned nations:

- (People's Republic of Bulgaria) Maria Gigova (world champion in rhythmic gymnastics)
- (Hungarian People's Republic) András Balczó (modern pentathlon, Hungarian Sportsman of the Year in 1966, 1968, 1969)
- (East Germany) Karin Janz (1972 Olympic champion in artistic gymnastics)
- (North Korea) Ri Ho-jun (1972 Olympic champion in shooting)
- (Cuba) Teófilo Stevenson (1972 Olympic champion in boxing) (he later won in 1976 and 1980 also)
- (Mongolian People's Republic) Khorloogiin Bayanmönkh (1972 world champion in freestyle wrestling)
- (Polish People's Republic) Włodzimierz Lubański (1972 Olympic champion in football)
- (Socialist Republic of Romania) Nicolae Martinescu (1972 Olympic champion in wrestling)
- (Czechoslovak Socialist Republic) Ondrej Nepela (1972 Olympic champion in figure skating)

== Coaches ==
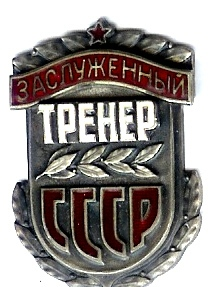
Badge for Merited Coach of the USSR

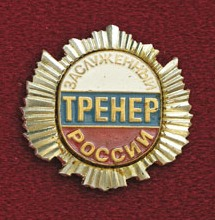
Badge for Merited Coach of Russia

Under the Soviet system, titles were awarded to coaches based on national and international success. Significant International success brought Merited Coach of the USSR while national success was rewarded with Merited Coach of one of the Soviet republics.

- (Soviet Union) Merited Coach of the USSR (Russian: Заслуженный тренер СССР)
- (Uzbek Soviet Socialist Republic) Merited Coach of the Uzbek SSR (Russian: Заслуженный тренер Узбекской ССР)
- (Georgian Soviet Socialist Republic) Merited Coach of the Georgian SSR (Russian: заслуженный тренер Грузинской ССР)

The same system is in place today for most of the former Soviet republics as well. For example,

- Merited Coach of Russia (Russian: Заслуженный тренер России)
- Merited Coach of Ukraine (Ukrainian: Заслужений тренер України)
- Merited Coach of Uzbekistan (Uzbek: Ўзбекистон Республикасида хизмат кўрсатган спорт устози)

=== Non-Russian coaches ===
Since 2007, a few foreign coaches have been awarded the title of Merited Coach of Russia for their roles in the development of sports in Russia:

- (Israel) (United States) 2007: David Blatt, coach of the Russian men's basketball team, champions, 2007 European Championships
- (Italy) 2008: Giovanni Caprara, coach of the Russian women's volleyball team, champions, 2006 European Championships
- (Netherlands) 2008: Dick Advocaat, football, head coach of Zenit St. Petersburg, champions, 2007–08 UEFA Cup and 2008 UEFA Super Cup
- (Netherlands) 2013: Guus Hiddink, football, coach of Russian national team, bronze medalists, 2008 European Championships
- (Germany) 2013: Oleg Znarok, hockey, head coach of Dynamo Moscow, champions, 2011/2012 Gagarin Cup
- (Latvia) 2013: Harijs Vītoliņš, hockey, assistant coach of Dynamo Moscow, champions, 2012/2013 Gagarin Cup

== Judges and referees ==
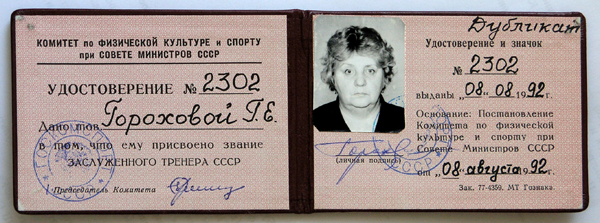
ID card for fencing coach Galina Gorokhova identifying her as a Merited Coach of the Soviet Union

The title of Honored Judge of Russia may be given to sport judges and referees who have reached the level of "All-Russian Sports Official" and have distinguished careers of officiating to their credit.

== See also ==
- Ready for Labour and Defence of the USSR
- Master of Sports of Russia
- Unified Sports Classification of Ukraine
