= NASCAR Goes Country =

Compilation album by Various artists
- Released: 1975
- Recorded: 1975; Bradley's Barn (Mt. Juliet, Tennessee)
- Genre: Country
- Length: 27:26
- Label: MCA
- Producer: Bill Haynes, Milton Blackford

Various artists chronology
NASCAR Goes Country (1975)	Stock Car Racing's Entertainers of the Year (1985)

NASCAR Goes Country is a country music cover album. Originally released in 1975 by MCA Records, and later re-released in 2002 by Speedway Records, the album features eleven songs with lead vocals by NASCAR drivers Richard Petty; David Pearson; Cale Yarborough; Bobby Allison; Buddy Baker; and Darrell Waltrip. The Jordanaires contributed to additional backing vocals.

== Track listing ==
No.	Title	Artist	Length
1.	"Ninety-Nine Bottles of Beer (On the Wall)"	Richard Petty, David Pearson, Cale Yarborough, Bobby Allison, Buddy Baker, Darrell Waltrip	3:25
2.	"Hey, Good Lookin'"	Cale Yarborough	1:44
3.	"Six Days on the Road"	Cale Yarborough	2:06
4.	"Let the Good Times Roll"	Richard Petty	2:24
5.	"Watch Out for the Matador"	Bobby Allison	2:14
6.	"Butterbeans"	Buddy Baker	3:02
7.	"When the Saints Go Marching In"	Richard Petty, David Pearson, Cale Yarborough, Bobby Allison, Buddy Baker, Darrell Waltrip	2:18
8.	"Maybellene"	David Pearson	2:05
9.	"I Can Help"	Darrell Waltrip	2:55
10.	"Big Daddy"	Bobby Allison	2:28
11.	"King of the Road"	Richard Petty	2:11

== Credits and personnel ==
- Richard Petty – vocals
- David Pearson – vocals
- Cale Yarborough – vocals
- Bobby Allison – vocals
- Buddy Baker – vocals
- Darrell Waltrip – vocals
- The Jordanaires – vocals
- Harold Bradley – bass, banjo
- James Colvard – lead guitar
- Bob Moore – bass
- Ron Oates – piano
- Kelso Herston – rhythm guitar
- Buddy Harman – drums
- Bobby Thompson – rhythm guitar, banjo
- Charlie McCoy – harmonica
- Lloyd Green – steel guitar
- Bill Haynes – producer
- Milton Blackford – producer
- Walter Haynes – technical director
- Jim Donoho – talent coordinator
- Joe Mills – engineer
- Bobby Bradley – engineer
- Vic Gabany – engineer

== Release history ==
Region	Date	Format	Label	Ref.
United States	1975	LP	MCA	
United States	2002	CD	Speedway	

== See also ==
- 1975 in country music
- 1975 NASCAR Winston Cup Series
- Marty Robbins
