= Champion of the People's Republic of Albania =

Sports title of the People's Socialist Republic of Albania

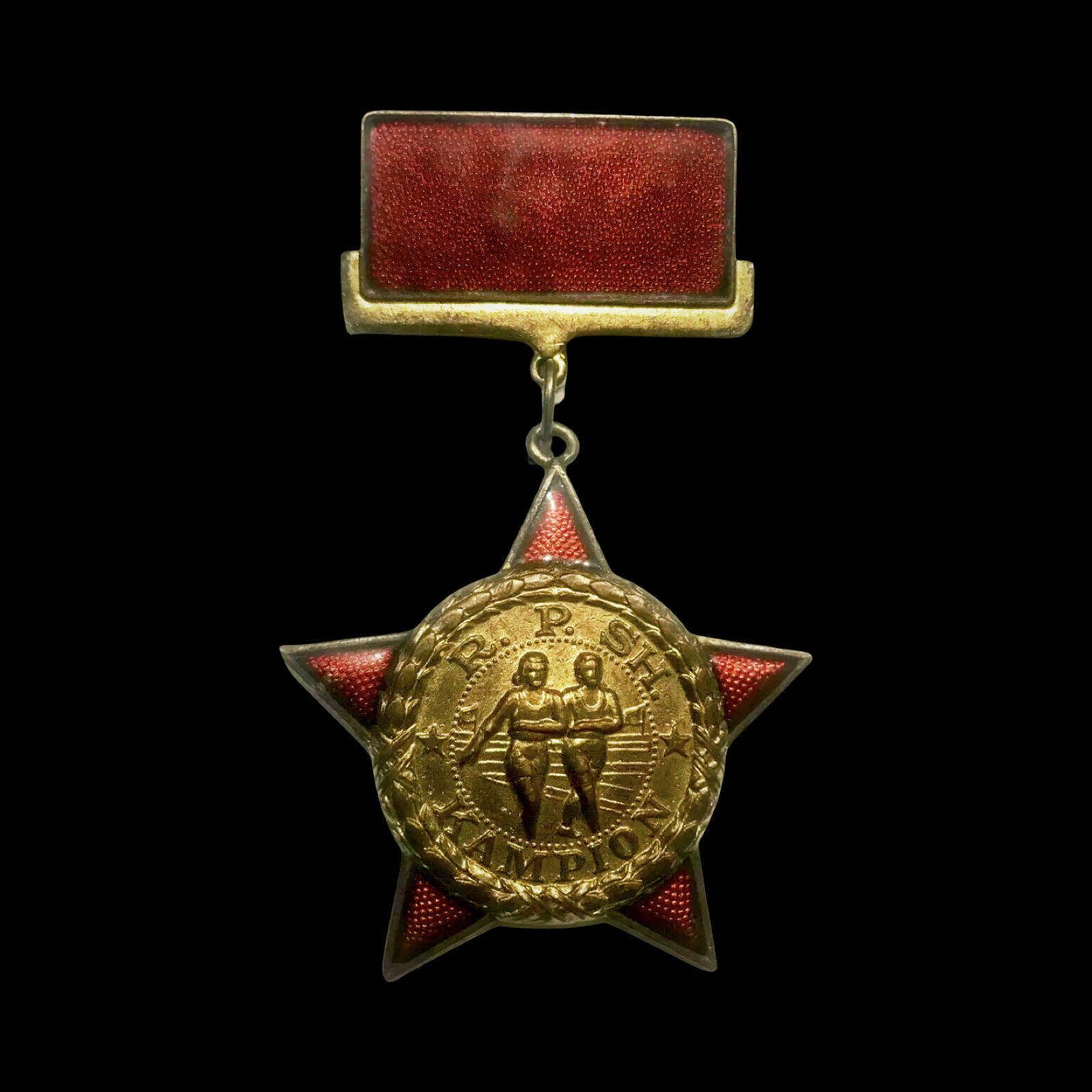
- Native name: Kampion i Republikës Popullore të Shqipërisë
- Type: Sports title and medal
- Awarded for: First place in a national championship.
- Country: People's Socialist Republic of Albania
- Eligibility: Athletes and members of sports teams
- Status: Discontinued
- Established: 1957

The Champion of the People's Republic of Albania (Albanian: Kampion i Republikës Popullore të Shqipërisë) was a sports title awarded in the People's Socialist Republic of Albania to national championship winners. It was conferred on athletes who placed first in individual competitions and on members of teams that won national championships.

== History ==
The Champion of the People's Republic of Albania formed part of the system of sporting distinctions used to recognise achievement in the country's main sporting competitions. It was reserved for national championship winners, being awarded to the first-place finisher in individual events and to members of championship-winning teams.

At senior level, athletes were required to have attained at least the First Category sporting classification.

Two variants of the medal were issued, distinguished by their design and the abbreviation of the Albanian state's official name.

== Insignia ==
=== First design ===
The first design consisted of a five-pointed star with a central depiction of two athletes, one male and one female. The initials RPSH, abbreviating "Republika Popullore e Shqipërisë", appeared above the figures, while Kampion ("Champion") was inscribed below. The central field and inscriptions were golden, contrasting with the red points of the star.

=== Second design ===
1976 model of the Champion Medal

The later design was circular and depicted an athlete standing on a winners' podium against the background of a red flag. A red five-pointed star was positioned to the left of the figure. The initials RPSSH, abbreviating "Republika Popullore Socialiste e Shqipërisë", appeared above the composition, with "Kampion" below. The field and inscriptions were rendered in gold.

== Diploma ==
The medal was accompanied by an official diploma, which recorded the recipient's achievement in either an individual or team competition. Diplomas were awarded more broadly than the medal itself, covering the first three places in national competitions.

In individual events, diplomas were presented to athletes finishing first, second and third, while in team events they were awarded to the members of teams placed in the top three positions.

== Recipients ==
=== Athletics ===
- Isa Tare – 1964
- Rasim Kraja – 1965
- Xhulieta Muço
- Minella Anastasiadhi
- Koço Dhrami
- Kastriot Malaj
- Kristaq Laçi

=== Football ===
- Spiro Çurri
- Alfred Ferko
- Agim Bubeqi
- Rapo Taho
- Sokol Kushta
- Nako Saraçi
- Kreshnik Çipi
- Alfred Zijai

=== Gymnastics ===
- Gani Mezini – 1965
- Andrea Pavli
- Yllka Hela
- Mbarime Belaj
- Albana Dhima – 1990
- Telat Agolli

=== Mountaineering ===
- Aleksandër Bojaxhi – 1969

=== Shooting ===
- Niko Shtrëpi
- Ilir Kallfa

=== Swimming ===
- Makbule Llagami
- Elida Xhindi

=== Volleyball ===
- Hysen Domi – 1974

=== Weightlifting ===
- Vehap Xhindoli – 1964
- Pirro Dhima – 1990
- Telat Agolli

=== Wrestling ===
- Nikoll Grimaj
- Rrapush Hakrama
- Fiqiri Rama

=== Other ===
- Afërdita Aliaj
- Miço Papadhopulli

== See also ==
- Orders, decorations, and medals of Albania
- Master of Sport
- Distinguished Figure in Sport
