= Asian Volleyball Cup =

Asian Volleyball Cup may refer to:

- AVC Cup for Men a competition for senior men's national volleyball teams of Asia and Oceania, organized by the Asian Volleyball Confederation (AVC)
- AVC Cup for Women, a competition for senior women's national volleyball teams of Asia and Oceania, organized by the Asian Volleyball Confederation (AVC)
