= World Series of Country Music Proudly Presents Stock Car Racing's Entertainers of the Year =

Studio album by Various artists
- Released: 1985
- Genre: Country
- Label: World Series of Country Music
- Producer: Mike Hopkins

Various artists chronology
NASCAR Goes Country (1975)	World Series of Country Music Proudly Presents Stock Car Racing's Entertainers of the Year (1985)

World Series of Country Music Proudly Presents Stock Car Racing's Entertainers of the Year is a studio album released in 1985 by World Series of Country Music. The album was compiled of 21 original country music songs with lead vocals of all songs all sung by various NASCAR drivers, plus an introduction track by Ned Jarrett.

== Background ==
The album was the creation of country music promoter Mike Hopkins, who wanted to create a concept album featuring NASCAR's biggest stars to express themselves musically. Hopkins, trying to avoid the flop of NASCAR Goes Country, hired 25 professional songwriters to write songs for the album, of which 80 songs were created, and 21 were chosen for drivers to sing. Songs were chosen based on a driver interview, asking them what drove their ambition, heroes, families, and more. Hopkins told the songwriters "Here are the words of an auto racer, what he believes, what he stands for. You go and write me a song from this material." Around $200,000 was poured into the project.

Many of the songs relate to achievements or the drivers' personality. For example, Bobby Hillin Jr. talks about his crew chief, Harry Hyde. Dale Earnhardt's song, "Hard Charger", relates to his rough reputation. Bill Elliott's song talks about his career.

Fans formerly could order an album by sending $19.95 plus $3.00 handling to World Series of Country Music. To help promote the album, NASCAR driver and legend Ned Jarrett would make commercials promoting the album in 1985.

== Track listing ==
No.	Title	Artist	Length
1.	"Moderation"	Ned Jarrett	0:52
2.	"The People Who Love Me (Worry a Lot)"	Kyle Petty	3:52
3.	"Wizard of the Wheel"	Dick Brooks	3:15
4.	"Born to Drive"	Phil Parsons	2:23
5.	"A Crazy Racin' Man"	Bill Elliott	1:29
6.	"Race Track Fever"	Dale Jarrett	2:17
7.	"I'm Puttin' You in My Rearview"	Buddy Baker	2:18
8.	"A Driver's Prayer"	Trevor Boys	3:33
9.	"The All-American Stock Car Racing Fan"	James Hylton	1:51
10.	"The Winner"	Cale Yarborough	2:36
11.	"Trying to Win It All"	Ricky Rudd	1:58
12.	"Me and the Rookie"	Benny Parsons	3:58
13.	"Thanks for the Ride, Harry Hyde"	Bobby Hillin Jr.	1:56
14.	"That Race Car Makes a Demon Out of Me"	Bobby Allison	2:08
15.	"It's What's Up Front That Counts"	Rusty Wallace	2:29
16.	"Super Speedway Man"	Ron Bouchard	1:57
17.	"The Iceman's Hot"	Terry Labonte	2:14
18.	"The Man, Geoff Bodine"	Geoff Bodine	2:54
19.	"I'm Doin' the Best with What I Got"	Dave Marcis	2:00
20.	"T-Bone"	Richard Childress	2:46
21.	"I'm Always a Winner with You"	Joe Ruttman	2:42
22.	"Hard Charger"	Dale Earnhardt	2:23

== Reception ==
While better than the previous album including NASCAR drivers, it was still a flop. Only 20,000 copies were ever sold, and the album was eventually pulled a couple of years later by the label. The album has gone largely into obscurity, but on occasion NASCAR and its drivers still remember the album.
