= European Volleyball League =

European Volleyball League may refer to

- Men's European Volleyball League
- Women's European Volleyball League
