= African Volleyball Championship =

African Volleyball Championship may refer to

- Men's African Volleyball Championship
- Women's African Volleyball Championship
