= NORCECA Volleyball Championship =

NORCECA Volleyball Championship may refer to

- NORCECA Men's Volleyball Championship
- NORCECA Women's Volleyball Championship
