= European Volleyball Championship =

European Volleyball Championship may refer to

- Men's European Volleyball Championship
- Women's European Volleyball Championship
