= Asian Volleyball Championships =

Asian Volleyball Championships may refer to:

- Asian Men's Volleyball Championship, the competition for men
- Asian Women's Volleyball Championship, the competition for women
