= FIVB Volleyball World Championship =

FIVB Volleyball World Championship may refer to:

- FIVB Men's Volleyball World Championship
- FIVB Women's Volleyball World Championship
