= List of world cups =

Major international sports competitions

The world cups are, depending on the sport, either the highest level international tournaments in a given sport, or the second level of competition after world championships.

== List ==
=== Athletics (track and field) ===
- Athletics World Cup (defunct)
- IAAF Continental Cup (defunct)

=== Baseball and softball ===
- Baseball World Cup (defunct)
- Women's Baseball World Cup
- World Baseball Classic
- World Cup of Softball

=== Basketball ===
- FIBA Basketball World Cup
- FIBA Women's Basketball World Cup
- FIBA 3x3 World Cup
- Wheelchair Basketball World Championship (also called Gold Cup)

=== Combat sports ===
- Biathlon World Cup (skiing & shooting)
- Archery World Cup
- Boxing World Cup
- Fencing World Cup
- Roller Derby World Cup
- ISSF World Cup (shooting)
- World Cup Taekwondo Team Championships
- Wrestling World Cup

==== Professional wrestling ====
- Lucha Libre World Cup
- TNA World Cup
- World Cup of Wrestling
- WWE World Cup

=== Cricket ===
==== Main men's tournaments ====
- ICC Men's Cricket World Cup
- ICC Men's T20 World Cup

==== Main women's tournaments ====
- ICC Women's Cricket World Cup
- ICC Women's T20 World Cup

==== Under 19 / youth tournaments ====
- ICC Under-19 Cricket World Cup
- ICC Women's Under-19 Cricket World Cup

==== Qualifying tournaments ====
- ICC Men's Cricket World Cup Qualifier
- ICC Men's T20 World Cup Qualifier
- ICC Women's Cricket World Cup Qualifier
- ICC Women's T20 World Cup Qualifier

=== Equestrian ===
- Dubai World Cup (horse racing)
- Pegasus World Cup (horse racing)
- Show Jumping World Cup (equestrian)

=== Football ===
==== American football (gridiron) ====
- IFAF World Cup

==== Association football (soccer) ====
- FIFA World Cup
- FIFA U-20 World Cup
- FIFA U-17 World Cup
- FIFA Club World Cup
- FIFA Confederations Cup (defunct)
- FIFA Women's World Cup
- FIFA U-20 Women's World Cup
- FIFA U-17 Women's World Cup
- FIFA Beach Soccer World Cup
- FIFA Futsal World Cup
- FIFA Intercontinental Cup
- FIFA Women's Club World Cup (upcoming)
- FIFA Women's Champions Cup
- CONIFA World Football Cup (non-FIFA nations football)
- Viva World Cup (non-FIFA nations football, (defunct)

==== Australian football ====
- Australian Football International Cup

==== Rugby league football ====
- Rugby League World Cup
- Rugby League World Cup 9s
- Touch Football World Cup
- Women's Rugby League World Cup
- Wheelchair Rugby League World Cup

==== Rugby union football ====
- Rugby World Cup
- Rugby World Cup Sevens
- Women's Rugby World Cup

=== Golf ===
- Women's World Cup of Golf
- World Cup (men's golf)

=== Gymnastics ===
- FIG World Cup
  - Artistic Gymnastics World Cup
  - Rhythmic Gymnastics World Cup

=== Hockey ===
==== Field hockey ====
- Men's FIH Hockey World Cup (sometimes called the Hockey World Championships), the men's field hockey World Cup
- Women's FIH Hockey World Cup, the women's field hockey World Cup
- Men's FIH Hockey Junior World Cup, the junior men's field hockey World Cup
- Women's FIH Hockey Junior World Cup, the junior women's field hockey World Cup
- FIH Men's Hockey5s World Cup, men's 5-a-side including goalies
- FIH Women's Hockey5s World Cup, women's 5-a-side including goalies

==== Ice hockey ====
- World Cup of Hockey
- Junior Club World Cup, for junior ice hockey club teams

==== Bandy ====
- Bandy World Cup, for bandy (also known as Russian hockey)
- Bandy World Cup Women

=== Kabaddi ===
- Kabaddi World Cup (circle style)
- Kabaddi World Cup (standard style)

=== Lacrosse ===
- World Lacrosse Men's Championship
- World Lacrosse Box Championships
- World Lacrosse Women's Championship

=== Motorsports ===
- A1 Grand Prix, a series billed as the "World Cup of Motorsport"
- Speedway World Cup (motorcycle speedway)
- Speedway World Team Cup (motorcycle speedway)

=== Multi-discipline sports ===
- World Triathlon Cup (cycling, running, swimming)
- Biathlon World Cup (skiing, shooting)

=== Multi-sport events ===
- Paralympic World Cup (defunct)
- Paralympic Winter World Cup

=== Racquet sports ===
- Table Tennis World Cup (men's singles, women's singles, men's doubles, women's doubles and mixed team)

==== Badminton ====
- Sudirman Cup (mixed team)
- Thomas Cup (men's team)
- Uber Cup (women's team)
- Badminton World Cup (defunct)

==== Tennis ====
- Davis Cup (men's team)
- Fed Cup (women's team)
- Hopman Cup (mixed team)
- World Team Cup (men's team) – defunct

=== Rollersports ===
- Men's Roller Derby World Cup
- Roll Ball World Cup
- Roller Derby World Cup
- World Inline Cup (inline speed skating)

=== Video games and table ===
- Electronic Sports World Cup
- Fortnite World Cup
- Chess World Cup
- PDC World Cup of Darts
- World Cup of Poker
- World Cup of Pool

=== Volleyball ===
- FIVB Men's Volleyball World Cup (1965–2019)
- FIVB Women's Volleyball World Cup (1973–2019)
- FIVB Volleyball World Grand Champions Cup (men's and women's)

=== Water sports ===
- Canoe World Cup
- Canoe Slalom World Cup
- World Rowing Cup
- World Aquatics Diving World Cup
- World Aquatics Swimming World Cup
- FINA Synchronised Swimming World Cup
- FINA Water Polo World Cup

=== Winter sports ===
==== Ski/snowboard ====
- Biathlon World Cup
- FIS Alpine Ski World Cup
- FIS Cross-Country World Cup
- FIS Freestyle Ski World Cup
- FIS Ski Cross World Cup
- FIS Nordic Combined World Cup
- FIS Ski Jumping World Cup
- FIS Snowboard World Cup
- FIS Ski Flying World Cup
- World Cup in Ski Orienteering

==== Sledding ====
- Bobsleigh World Cup
- Luge World Cup
- Skeleton World Cup

==== Other winter sports ====
- Curling World Cup (defunct)
- UIAA Ice Climbing World Cup
- ISU Short Track Speed Skating World Cup (defunct)
- ISU Speed Skating World Cup

=== Other ===
- Netball World Cup (women's)
- Orienteering World Cup
- PBR Global Cup (bull riding, defunct)
- PBR World Cup (bull riding, defunct)
- QubicaAMF Bowling World Cup
- UCI World Cups (various cycling world cups)
- Bowls World Cup

== See also ==
- List of world cups and world championships for juniors and youth
- List of world sports championships
- World championship
- World cup
