= 2012–13 Algerian Men's Volleyball League =

2012–13 Algerian League
- League: Algerian League
- Sport: Volleyball
- Duration: October 19, 2012 -May 18, 2013
- Teams: 10
- League champions: GS Pétroliers MVB (10th title)
- Runners-up: Étoile sportive sétifienne
- Promoted to Nationale Two: ITR Sétif & PO Chlef
- Relegated to Nationale Two: ITR Sétif & RC M’sila

Algerian League seasons
- 2011–12 2013–14

The 2012–13 season of the Algerian Men's Volleyball League was the 51st annual season of the country's highest volleyball level.

== Members of the Algerian Men's Volleyball League (2012–13 season) ==
Team	Location	Hall	Stadium capacity
MB Bejaia	Béjaïa	Salle CSP Amirouche	
GS Pétroliers MVB	Algiers	Salle Hacène Harcha	8.500
Nadi Riadhi Bordj Bou Arreridj	Bordj Bou Arreridj	Salle OMS Boubiaa Saad	
Étoile sportive sétifienne	Sétif	Salle 8 Mai 1945	
Espérance sportive Béthioua	Bethioua	Salle OMS Benmelouka	
Progrès Olympique Chlef	Chlef	Salle Omnisport Mohamed Nasri	2.500
Association Sportive Ville Blida	Blida	Salle OM Hocine Chalane	3.000
ITR Sétif	Sétif	Salle 1006 LGTS	
Olympique Milien Ketamien	El Milia	Salle OMS EL Meridja	
Raed Chabab M’sila	M’sila	Salle OMS Bourezg	

== Regular season ==
Pos	Team	Pld	W	L	Pts	SW	SL	SR	SPW	SPL	SPR	Qualification
1	MB Bejaia	18	13	5	43	47	19	2.474	1428	1165	1.226	Semi-final
2	Étoile sportive sétifienne	18	14	4	41	45	22	2.045	1449	1450	0.999	Semi-final
3	Nadi Riadhi Bordj Bou Arreridj	18	13	5	39	43	24	1.792	1450	1327	1.093	Semi-final
4	GS Pétroliers	18	11	7	31	40	31	1.290	1614	1533	1.053	Semi-final
5	Olympique Milien Ketamien	18	9	9	30	40	35	1.143	1638	1556	1.053	Play Down
6	Progrès Olympique Chlef	18	9	9	28	34	31	1.097	1450	1296	1.119	Play Down
7	Espérance sportive Béthioua	18	9	9	25	35	37	0.946	1559	1590	0.981	Play Down
8	Association Sportive Ville Blida	18	7	11	22	32	39	0.821	1511	1561	0.968	Play Down
9	Raed Chabab M’sila	18	3	15	9	14	47	0.298	1250	1480	0.845	Play Down
10	ITR Sétif	18	1	17	2	8	53	0.151	1117	1474	0.758	Play Down

=== Round 1 ===
Date	Time		Score		Set 1	Set 2	Set 3	Set 4	Set 5	Total	Report
09 Nov	16:00	NR Bordj Bou Arreridj	3–1	PO Chlef	25–16	21–25	25–19	25–18	–	96–78	Report
09 Nov	16:00	MB Bejaia	3–0	ITR Sétif	25–10	25–19	25–19	–	–	75–48	Report
09 Nov	16:00	ÉS Sétifienne	3–0	RC M’sila	25–11	25–20	25–10	–	–	75–41	Report
09 Nov	16:00	ES Béthioua	3–2	GS Pétroliers	25–19	20–25	23–25	25–18	17–15	110–102	Report
09 Nov	16:00	ASV Blida	3–2	OM Ketamien	23–25	20–25	25–20	25–15	15–9	108–94	Report

=== Round 2 ===
Date	Time		Score		Set 1	Set 2	Set 3	Set 4	Set 5	Total	Report
16 Nov	16:00	ITR Sétif	1–3	GS Pétroliers	25–23	16–25	12–25	15–25	–	68–98	Report
16 Nov	16:00	OM Ketamien	2–3	ES Béthioua	18–25	25–27	25–17	25–20	19–21	112–110	Report
16 Nov	16:00	PO Chlef	1–3	ÉS Sétifienne	17–25	23–25	25–20	19–25	–	84–95	Report
16 Nov	16:00	RC M’sila	0–3	ASV Blida	20–25	17–25	19–25	–	–	56–75	Report
16 Nov	16:00	MB Bejaia	1–3	NR Bordj Bou Arreridj	25–22	19–25	19–25	16–25	–	79–97	Report

=== Round 3 ===
Date	Time		Score		Set 1	Set 2	Set 3	Set 4	Set 5	Total	Report
20 Nov	14:30	NR Bordj Bou Arreridj	3–0	ITR Sétif	25–13	25–18	25–19	–	–	75–50	Report
20 Nov	14:30	ÉS Sétifienne	2–3	MB Bejaia	20–25	25–22	28–26	22–25	13–15	108–113	Report
20 Nov	14:30	ASV Blida	3–0	PO Chlef	25–22	25–22	25–18	–	–	75–62	Report
20 Nov	14:30	ES Béthioua	3–0	RC M’sila	25–20	25–14	25–18	–	–	75–52	Report
20 Nov	14:30	GS Pétroliers	3–2	OM Ketamien	25–22	25–15	23–25	23–25	15–13	111–100	Report

=== Round 4 ===
Date	Time		Score		Set 1	Set 2	Set 3	Set 4	Set 5	Total	Report
07 Dec	16:00	ITR Sétif	0–3	OM Ketamien	12–25	17–25	17–25	–	–	46–75	Report
07 Dec	16:00	RC M’sila	3–2	GS Pétroliers	27–25	16–25	28–26	20–25	15–13	106–114	Report
07 Dec	16:00	PO Chlef	1–3	ES Béthioua	23–25	25–27	25–19	22–25	–	95–96	Report
07 Dec	16:00	MB Bejaia	3–1	ASV Blida	24–26	25–22	25–18	25–19	–	99–85	Report
07 Dec	16:00	NR Bordj Bou Arreridj	3–2	ÉS Sétifienne	25–14	25–19	21–25	29–31	15–8	115–97	Report

=== Round 5 ===
Date	Time		Score		Set 1	Set 2	Set 3	Set 4	Set 5	Total	Report
11 Dec	14:30	ÉS Sétifienne	3–0	ITR Sétif	25–16	25–20	25–23	–	–	75–59	Report
11 Dec	14:30	ASV Blida	0–3	NR Bordj Bou Arreridj	19–25	15–25	19–25	–	–	53–75	Report
11 Dec	14:30	ES Béthioua	1–3	MB Bejaia	24–26	25–16	21–25	13–25	–	83–92	Report
11 Dec	14:30	GS Pétroliers	3–0	PO Chlef	25–21	25–15	25–21	–	–	75–57	Report
11 Dec	14:30	OM Ketamien	3–1	RC M’sila	25–21	23–25	25–16	25–21	–	98–83	Report

=== Round 6 ===
Date	Time		Score		Set 1	Set 2	Set 3	Set 4	Set 5	Total	Report
28 Dec	16:00	ITR Sétif	–	RC M’sila	–	–	–	–	–	0–0	[ Report]
28 Dec	16:00	PO Chlef	–	OM Ketamien	–	–	–	–	–	0–0	[ Report]
28 Dec	16:00	MB Bejaia	–	GS Pétroliers	–	–	–	–	–	0–0	[ Report]
28 Dec	16:00	NR Bordj Bou Arreridj	–	ES Béthioua	–	–	–	–	–	0–0	[ Report]
28 Dec	16:00	ÉS Sétifienne	–	ASV Blida	–	–	–	–	–	0–0	[ Report]

=== Round 7 ===
Date	Time		Score		Set 1	Set 2	Set 3	Set 4	Set 5	Total	Report
04 Jan	16:00	ASV Blida	–	ITR Sétif	–	–	–	–	–	0–0	[ Report]
04 Jan	16:00	ES Béthioua	–	ÉS Sétifienne	–	–	–	–	–	0–0	[ Report]
04 Jan	16:00	GS Pétroliers	–	NR Bordj Bou Arreridj	–	–	–	–	–	0–0	[ Report]
04 Jan	16:00	OM Ketamien	–	MB Bejaia	–	–	–	–	–	0–0	[ Report]
04 Jan	16:00	RC M’sila	–	PO Chlef	–	–	–	–	–	0–0	[ Report]

=== Round 8 ===
Date	Time		Score		Set 1	Set 2	Set 3	Set 4	Set 5	Total	Report
18 Jan	16:00	ITR Sétif	–	PO Chlef	–	–	–	–	–	0–0	[ Report]
18 Jan	16:00	MB Bejaia	–	RC M’sila	–	–	–	–	–	0–0	[ Report]
18 Jan	16:00	NR Bordj Bou Arreridj	–	OM Ketamien	–	–	–	–	–	0–0	[ Report]
18 Jan	16:00	ÉS Sétifienne	–	GS Pétroliers	–	–	–	–	–	0–0	[ Report]
18 Jan	16:00	ASV Blida	–	ES Béthioua	–	–	–	–	–	0–0	[ Report]

=== Round 9 ===
Date	Time		Score		Set 1	Set 2	Set 3	Set 4	Set 5	Total	Report
25 Jan	16:00	ES Béthioua	–	ITR Sétif	–	–	–	–	–	0–0	[ Report]
25 Jan	16:00	GS Pétroliers	–	ASV Blida	–	–	–	–	–	0–0	[ Report]
25 Jan	16:00	OM Ketamien	–	ÉS Sétifienne	–	–	–	–	–	0–0	[ Report]
25 Jan	16:00	RC M’sila	–	NR Bordj Bou Arreridj	–	–	–	–	–	0–0	[ Report]
25 Jan	16:00	PO Chlef	–	MB Bejaia	–	–	–	–	–	0–0	[ Report]

=== Round 10 ===
Date	Time		Score		Set 1	Set 2	Set 3	Set 4	Set 5	Total	Report
	16:00	PO Chlef	–	NR Bordj Bou Arreridj	–	–	–	–	–	0–0	[ Report]
	16:00	ITR Sétif	–	MB Bejaia	–	–	–	–	–	0–0	[ Report]
	16:00	RC M’sila	–	ÉS Sétifienne	–	–	–	–	–	0–0	[ Report]
	16:00	GS Pétroliers	–	ES Béthioua	–	–	–	–	–	0–0	[ Report]
	16:00	OM Ketamien	–	ASV Blida	–	–	–	–	–	0–0	[ Report]

=== Round 11 ===
Date	Time		Score		Set 1	Set 2	Set 3	Set 4	Set 5	Total	Report
	16:00	GS Pétroliers	–	ITR Sétif	–	–	–	–	–	0–0	[ Report]
	16:00	ES Béthioua	–	OM Ketamien	–	–	–	–	–	0–0	[ Report]
	16:00	ÉS Sétifienne	–	PO Chlef	–	–	–	–	–	0–0	[ Report]
	16:00	ASV Blida	–	RC M’sila	–	–	–	–	–	0–0	[ Report]
	16:00	NR Bordj Bou Arreridj	–	MB Bejaia	–	–	–	–	–	0–0	[ Report]

=== Round 12 ===
Date	Time		Score		Set 1	Set 2	Set 3	Set 4	Set 5	Total	Report
	16:00	ITR Sétif	–	NR Bordj Bou Arreridj	–	–	–	–	–	0–0	[ Report]
	16:00	MB Bejaia	–	ÉS Sétifienne	–	–	–	–	–	0–0	[ Report]
	16:00	PO Chlef	–	ASV Blida	–	–	–	–	–	0–0	[ Report]
	16:00	RC M’sila	–	ES Béthioua	–	–	–	–	–	0–0	[ Report]
	16:00	OM Ketamien	–	GS Pétroliers	–	–	–	–	–	0–0	[ Report]

=== Round 13 ===
Date	Time		Score		Set 1	Set 2	Set 3	Set 4	Set 5	Total	Report
	16:00	OM Ketamien	–	ITR Sétif	–	–	–	–	–	0–0	[ Report]
	16:00	GS Pétroliers	–	RC M’sila	–	–	–	–	–	0–0	[ Report]
	16:00	ES Béthioua	–	PO Chlef	–	–	–	–	–	0–0	[ Report]
	16:00	ASV Blida	–	MB Bejaia	–	–	–	–	–	0–0	[ Report]
	16:00	ÉS Sétifienne	–	NR Bordj Bou Arreridj	–	–	–	–	–	0–0	[ Report]

=== Round 14 ===
Date	Time		Score		Set 1	Set 2	Set 3	Set 4	Set 5	Total	Report
	16:00	ITR Sétif	–	ÉS Sétifienne	–	–	–	–	–	0–0	[ Report]
	16:00	NR Bordj Bou Arreridj	–	ASV Blida	–	–	–	–	–	0–0	[ Report]
	16:00	MB Bejaia	–	ES Béthioua	–	–	–	–	–	0–0	[ Report]
	16:00	PO Chlef	–	GS Pétroliers	–	–	–	–	–	0–0	[ Report]
	16:00	RC M’sila	–	OM Ketamien	–	–	–	–	–	0–0	[ Report]

=== Round 15 ===
Date	Time		Score		Set 1	Set 2	Set 3	Set 4	Set 5	Total	Report
	16:00	RC M’sila	–	ITR Sétif	–	–	–	–	–	0–0	[ Report]
	16:00	OM Ketamien	–	PO Chlef	–	–	–	–	–	0–0	[ Report]
	16:00	GS Pétroliers	–	MB Bejaia	–	–	–	–	–	0–0	[ Report]
	16:00	ES Béthioua	–	NR Bordj Bou Arreridj	–	–	–	–	–	0–0	[ Report]
	16:00	ASV Blida	–	ÉS Sétifienne	–	–	–	–	–	0–0	[ Report]

=== Round 16 ===
Date	Time		Score		Set 1	Set 2	Set 3	Set 4	Set 5	Total	Report
	16:00	ITR Sétif	–	ASV Blida	–	–	–	–	–	0–0	[ Report]
	16:00	ÉS Sétifienne	–	ES Béthioua	–	–	–	–	–	0–0	[ Report]
	16:00	NR Bordj Bou Arreridj	–	GS Pétroliers	–	–	–	–	–	0–0	[ Report]
	16:00	MB Bejaia	–	OM Ketamien	–	–	–	–	–	0–0	[ Report]
	16:00	PO Chlef	–	RC M’sila	–	–	–	–	–	0–0	[ Report]

=== Round 17 ===
Date	Time		Score		Set 1	Set 2	Set 3	Set 4	Set 5	Total	Report
	16:00	PO Chlef	–	ITR Sétif	–	–	–	–	–	0–0	[ Report]
	16:00	RC M’sila	–	MB Bejaia	–	–	–	–	–	0–0	[ Report]
	16:00	OM Ketamien	–	NR Bordj Bou Arreridj	–	–	–	–	–	0–0	[ Report]
	16:00	GS Pétroliers	–	ÉS Sétifienne	–	–	–	–	–	0–0	[ Report]
	16:00	ES Béthioua	–	ASV Blida	–	–	–	–	–	0–0	[ Report]

=== Round 18 ===
Date	Time		Score		Set 1	Set 2	Set 3	Set 4	Set 5	Total	Report
	16:00	ITR Sétif	–	ES Béthioua	–	–	–	–	–	0–0	[ Report]
	16:00	ASV Blida	–	GS Pétroliers	–	–	–	–	–	0–0	[ Report]
	16:00	ÉS Sétifienne	–	OM Ketamien	–	–	–	–	–	0–0	[ Report]
	16:00	NR Bordj Bou Arreridj	–	RC M’sila	–	–	–	–	–	0–0	[ Report]
	16:00	MB Bejaia	–	PO Chlef	–	–	–	–	–	0–0	[ Report]

== Semi-final ==
Date	Time	Score	Set 1	Set 2	Set 3	Set 4	Set 5	Total	Report
	16:00	–	–	–	–	–	–	0–0	[ Report]

Date	Time	Score	Set 1	Set 2	Set 3	Set 4	Set 5	Total	Report
	16:00	–	–	–	–	–	–	0–0	[ Report]

== 3rd place ==
Date	Time	Score	Set 1	Set 2	Set 3	Set 4	Set 5	Total	Report
	16:00	–	–	–	–	–	–	0–0	[ Report]

== Final ==
Date	Time	Score	Set 1	Set 2	Set 3	Set 4	Set 5	Total	Report
	16:00	–	–	–	–	–	–	0–0	[ Report]

== Play Down ==
Pos	Team	Pld	W	L	Pts	SW	SL	SR	SPW	SPL	SPR	Relegation
5	–	0	0	0	0	0	0	—	0	0	—	
6	–	0	0	0	0	0	0	—	0	0	—	
7	–	0	0	0	0	0	0	—	0	0	—	
8	–	0	0	0	0	0	0	—	0	0	—	
9	–	0	0	0	0	0	0	—	0	0	—	Relegated to League 2
10	–	0	0	0	0	0	0	—	0	0	—	Relegated to League 2

=== Round 1 ===
Date	Time	Score	Set 1	Set 2	Set 3	Set 4	Set 5	Total	Report
	16:00	–	–	–	–	–	–	0–0	[ Report]
	16:00	–	–	–	–	–	–	0–0	[ Report]
	16:00	–	–	–	–	–	–	0–0	[ Report]

=== Round 2 ===
Date	Time	Score	Set 1	Set 2	Set 3	Set 4	Set 5	Total	Report
	16:00	–	–	–	–	–	–	0–0	[ Report]
	16:00	–	–	–	–	–	–	0–0	[ Report]
	16:00	–	–	–	–	–	–	0–0	[ Report]

=== Round 3 ===
Date	Time	Score	Set 1	Set 2	Set 3	Set 4	Set 5	Total	Report
	16:00	–	–	–	–	–	–	0–0	[ Report]
	16:00	–	–	–	–	–	–	0–0	[ Report]
	16:00	–	–	–	–	–	–	0–0	[ Report]

=== Round 4 ===
Date	Time	Score	Set 1	Set 2	Set 3	Set 4	Set 5	Total	Report
	16:00	–	–	–	–	–	–	0–0	[ Report]
	16:00	–	–	–	–	–	–	0–0	[ Report]
	16:00	–	–	–	–	–	–	0–0	[ Report]

=== Round 5 ===
Date	Time	Score	Set 1	Set 2	Set 3	Set 4	Set 5	Total	Report
	16:00	–	–	–	–	–	–	0–0	[ Report]
	16:00	–	–	–	–	–	–	0–0	[ Report]
	16:00	–	–	–	–	–	–	0–0	[ Report]
