= 2014–15 Algerian Women's Volleyball League =

2014–15 Algerian League
- League: Algerian League
- Sport: Volleyball
- Duration: September 19, 2014 - February 21, 2015
- Teams: 10
- League champions: GS Pétroliers WVB (26th title)
- Runners-up: ASW Béjaïa
- Promoted to Nationale Two: ASV Blida & RC Béjaïa
- Relegated to Nationale Two: ASV Blida & WO Chlef

Algerian League seasons
- 2013–14 2015–16

The 2014–15 season of the Algerian Women's Volleyball League was the 53rd annual season of the country's highest volleyball level.

== Members of the Algerian Women's Volleyball League (2014–15 season) ==
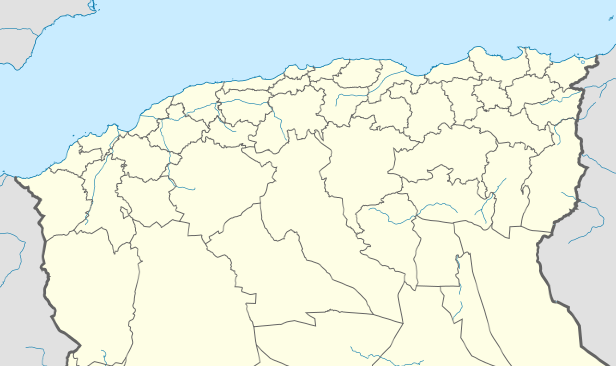
Location of the 2014–15 AWVL teams in Northern Algeria

Team	Location	Hall	Stadium capacity
Mechâal Baladiat Béjaïa	Béjaïa	Salle CSP Amirouche	
GS Pétroliers WVB	Algiers	Salle Hacène Harcha	8.500
Nedjmet Riadhi Chlef	Chlef	Salle OMS Chettia	
ASW Béjaïa	Béjaïa	Salle Bleue Béjaïa	
NC Béjaïa	Béjaïa	Salle Bleue Béjaïa	
Wydad Olympique Chlef	Chlef	Salle OMS Chettia	
Association Sportive Ville Blida	Blida	Salle OM Hocine Chalane	3.000
Seddouk Béjaïa Volleyball	El-Kseur	Salle CSP Berchiche El-Kseur	
Widad Athlétic Tlemcen	Tlemcen	Salle OPOW Tlemcen	
Racine Club Béjaïa	Béjaïa	Salle OPOW Béjaïa	

== Regular season ==
Pos	Team	Pld	W	L	Pts	SW	SL	SR	SPW	SPL	SPR	Qualification or relegation
1	GS Pétroliers WVB	18	17	1	52	53	7	7.571	1469	986	1.490	Champions
2	Association Sportive Wilaya Béjaïa	17	14	3	40	43	16	2.688	1353	1127	1.201	
3	Mechâal Baladiat Béjaïa	18	12	6	39	45	23	1.957	1560	1368	1.140	
4	Nedjmet Riadhi Chlef	17	13	4	37	41	20	2.050	1353	1242	1.089	
5	Nacéria Club Béjaïa	17	10	7	28	32	31	1.032	1334	1357	0.983	
6	Seddouk Béjaïa Volleyball	17	8	9	23	32	35	0.914	1401	1423	0.985	
7	Widad Athlétic Tlemcen	18	6	12	18	27	43	0.628	1421	1579	0.900	
8	Racine Club Béjaïa	18	5	13	17	23	42	0.548	1293	1480	0.874	
9	Association Sportive Ville Blida	18	2	16	7	15	50	0.300	1267	1540	0.823	Relegated to League 2
10	Wydad Olympique Chlef	18	1	17	3	8	52	0.154	1101	1450	0.759	Relegated to League 2

=== Round 1 ===
Date	Time		Score		Set 1	Set 2	Set 3	Set 4	Set 5	Total	Report
19 Sep	15:00	GS Pétroliers WVB	3–0	Association Sportive Ville Blida	25–18	25–13	25–12	–	–	75–43	Report
20 Sep	10:00	Mechâal Baladiat Béjaïa	3–0	Racine Club Béjaïa	25–21	25–21	25–18	–	–	75–60	Report
20 Sep	10:00	Nedjmet Riadhi Chlef	3–0	Wydad Olympique Chlef	25–13	25–16	25–16	–	–	75–45	Report
20 Sep	10:00	Association Sportive Wilaya Béjaïa	3–1	Nacéria Club Béjaïa	16–25	28–26	25–19	25–23	–	94–93	Report
20 Sep	10:00	Widad Athlétic Tlemcen	3–2	Seddouk Béjaïa Volleyball	22–25	25–19	18–25	25–19	15–13	105–101	Report

=== Round 2 ===
Date	Time		Score		Set 1	Set 2	Set 3	Set 4	Set 5	Total	Report
26 Sep	10:00	Association Sportive Ville Blida	3–1	Seddouk Béjaïa Volleyball	25–23	20–25	25–18	25–23	–	95–89	Report
26 Sep	15:00	GS Pétroliers WVB	3–1	Mechâal Baladiat Béjaïa	29–27	22–25	25–14	25–19	–	101–85	Report
26 Sep	10:00	Racine Club Béjaïa	0–3	Nedjmet Riadhi Chlef	14–25	16–25	21–25	–	–	51–75	Report
27 Sep	10:30	Wydad Olympique Chlef	0–3	Association Sportive Wilaya Béjaïa	18–25	16–25	12–25	–	–	46–75	Report
27 Sep	10:00	Nacéria Club Béjaïa	3–1	Widad Athlétic Tlemcen	25–6	26–24	19–25	25–19	–	95–74	Report

=== Round 3 ===
Date	Time		Score		Set 1	Set 2	Set 3	Set 4	Set 5	Total	Report
10 Oct	10:00	Mechâal Baladiat Béjaïa	3–0	Association Sportive Ville Blida	28–26	25–19	25–22	–	–	78–67	Report
11 Oct	10:30	Nedjmet Riadhi Chlef	3–2	GS Pétroliers WVB	25–23	25–23	10–25	11–25	15–12	86–108	Report
11 Oct	10:00	Association Sportive Wilaya Béjaïa	3–0	Racine Club Béjaïa	25–12	25–11	25–23	–	–	75–46	Report
11 Oct	10:00	Widad Athlétic Tlemcen	3–0	Wydad Olympique Chlef	25–10	25–23	29–27	–	–	79–60	Report
11 Oct	10:00	Seddouk Béjaïa Volleyball	1–3	Nacéria Club Béjaïa	22–25	23–25	25–15	15–25	–	85–90	Report

=== Round 4 ===
Date	Time		Score		Set 1	Set 2	Set 3	Set 4	Set 5	Total	Report
17 Oct	10:00	Association Sportive Ville Blida	3–1	Nacéria Club Béjaïa	21–25	25–23	25–19	25–17	–	96–84	Report
17 Oct	10:00	Racine Club Béjaïa	3–1	Widad Athlétic Tlemcen	25–17	25–18	21–25	25–17	–	96–77	Report
17 Oct	15:30	GS Pétroliers WVB	3–0	Association Sportive Wilaya Béjaïa	25–23	25–16	25–16	–	–	75–55	Report
17 Oct	10:00	Mechâal Baladiat Béjaïa	3–0	Nedjmet Riadhi Chlef	25–21	25–23	25–16	–	–	75–60	Report
18 Oct	10:30	Wydad Olympique Chlef	0–3	Seddouk Béjaïa Volleyball	14–25	16–25	18–25	–	–	48–75	Report

=== Round 5 ===
Date	Time		Score		Set 1	Set 2	Set 3	Set 4	Set 5	Total	Report
25 Oct	10:30	Nedjmet Riadhi Chlef	3–0	Association Sportive Ville Blida	25–14	25–19	25–13	–	–	75–46	Report
25 Oct	10:00	Nacéria Club Béjaïa	3–0	Wydad Olympique Chlef	25–20	25–18	25–16	–	–	75–54	Report
25 Oct	11:30	Association Sportive Wilaya Béjaïa	3–2	Mechâal Baladiat Béjaïa	25–18	25–19	15–25	15–25	15–11	95–98	Report
25 Oct	10:00	Widad Athlétic Tlemcen	1–3	GS Pétroliers WVB	23–25	13–25	25–19	14–25	–	75–94	Report
25 Oct	10:00	Seddouk Béjaïa Volleyball	3–1	Racine Club Béjaïa	–	–	–	–	–	0–0	Report

=== Round 6 ===
Date	Time		Score		Set 1	Set 2	Set 3	Set 4	Set 5	Total	Report
31 Oct	11:30	Racine Club Béjaïa	0–3	Nacéria Club Béjaïa	23–25	18–25	16–25	–	–	57–75	Report
31 Oct	15:30	GS Pétroliers WVB	3–1	Seddouk Béjaïa Volleyball	25–21	25–15	19–25	25–15	–	94–76	Report
31 Oct	10:00	Mechâal Baladiat Béjaïa	3–1	Widad Athlétic Tlemcen	25–20	25–12	24–26	25–17	–	99–75	Report
31 Oct	10:00	Nedjmet Riadhi Chlef	1–3	Association Sportive Wilaya Béjaïa	25–16	12–25	18–25	16–25	–	71–91	Report
03 Nov	10:00	Association Sportive Ville Blida	1–3	Wydad Olympique Chlef	26–24	19–25	18–25	20–25	–	83–99	Report

=== Round 7 ===
Date	Time		Score		Set 1	Set 2	Set 3	Set 4	Set 5	Total	Report
08 Nov	10:00	Widad Athlétic Tlemcen	0–3	Nedjmet Riadhi Chlef	19–25	13–25	18–25	–	–	50–75	Report
08 Nov	10:00	Seddouk Béjaïa Volleyball	3–2	Mechâal Baladiat Béjaïa	25–17	20–25	25–20	17–25	15–13	102–100	Report
08 Nov	10:00	Nacéria Club Béjaïa	0–3	GS Pétroliers WVB	8–25	24–26	23–25	–	–	55–76	Report
08 Nov	11:30	Association Sportive Wilaya Béjaïa	3–0	Association Sportive Ville Blida	25–11	25–13	25–19	–	–	75–43	Report
08 Nov	10:30	Wydad Olympique Chlef	1–3	Racine Club Béjaïa	26–24	20–25	18–25	20–25	–	84–99	Report

=== Round 8 ===
Date	Time		Score		Set 1	Set 2	Set 3	Set 4	Set 5	Total	Report
14 Nov	10:00	Association Sportive Ville Blida	0–3	Racine Club Béjaïa	21–25	11–25	15–25	–	–	47–75	Report
14 Nov	15:30	GS Pétroliers WVB	3–0	Wydad Olympique Chlef	25–10	25–6	25–8	–	–	75–24	Report
14 Nov	10:00	Mechâal Baladiat Béjaïa	2–3	Nacéria Club Béjaïa	25–14	13–25	25–19	19–25	13–15	95–98	Report
15 Nov	10:30	Nedjmet Riadhi Chlef	3–1	Seddouk Béjaïa Volleyball	17–25	25–10	25–18	25–22	–	92–75	Report
15 Nov	09:03	Association Sportive Wilaya Béjaïa	3–0	Widad Athlétic Tlemcen	25–17	25–17	25–11	–	–	75–45	Report

=== Round 9 ===
Date	Time		Score		Set 1	Set 2	Set 3	Set 4	Set 5	Total	Report
21 Nov	10:00	Racine Club Béjaïa	0–3	GS Pétroliers WVB	17–25	14–25	11–25	–	–	42–75	Report
22 Nov	10:00	Widad Athlétic Tlemcen	3–1	Association Sportive Ville Blida	25–23	20–25	25–17	25–14	–	95–79	Report
22 Nov	10:00	Seddouk Béjaïa Volleyball	1–3	Association Sportive Wilaya Béjaïa	18–25	25–22	18–25	19–25	–	80–97	Report
22 Nov	10:00	Nacéria Club Béjaïa	0–3	Nedjmet Riadhi Chlef	14–25	23–25	16–25	–	–	53–75	Report
22 Nov	10:30	Wydad Olympique Chlef	0–3	Mechâal Baladiat Béjaïa	15–25	10–25	19–25	–	–	44–75	Report

=== Round 10 ===
Date	Time		Score		Set 1	Set 2	Set 3	Set 4	Set 5	Total	Report
28 Nov	10:00	Association Sportive Ville Blida	0–3	GS Pétroliers WVB	19–25	10–25	19–25	–	–	48–75	Report
28 Nov	10:00	Racine Club Béjaïa	2–3	Mechâal Baladiat Béjaïa	27–25	17–25	25–19	21–25	13–15	103–109	Report
29 Nov	10:30	Wydad Olympique Chlef	1–3	Nedjmet Riadhi Chlef	23–25	17–25	25–21	14–25	–	79–96	Report
29 Nov	10:00	Nacéria Club Béjaïa	0–3	Association Sportive Wilaya Béjaïa	9–25	21–25	15–25	–	–	45–75	Report
29 Nov	09:00	Seddouk Béjaïa Volleyball	3–2	Widad Athlétic Tlemcen	25–23	20–25	22–25	25–16	15–11	107–100	Report

=== Round 11 ===
Date	Time		Score		Set 1	Set 2	Set 3	Set 4	Set 5	Total	Report
05 Dec	10:00	Mechâal Baladiat Béjaïa	0–3	GS Pétroliers WVB	23–25	19–25	19–25	–	–	61–75	Report
06 Dec	10:00	Widad Athlétic Tlemcen	2–3	Nacéria Club Béjaïa	25–18	22–25	25–19	21–25	13–25	106–112	Report
06 Dec	10:00	Association Sportive Wilaya Béjaïa	3–0	Wydad Olympique Chlef	25–8	25–16	25–14	–	–	75–38	Report
06 Dec	10:30	Nedjmet Riadhi Chlef	3–2	Racine Club Béjaïa	25–22	22–25	23–25	25–10	16–14	111–96	Report
06 Dec	10:00	Seddouk Béjaïa Volleyball	3–1	Association Sportive Ville Blida	20–25	25–20	25–22	25–14	–	95–81	Report

=== Round 12 ===
Date	Time		Score		Set 1	Set 2	Set 3	Set 4	Set 5	Total	Report
12 Dec	10:00	Association Sportive Ville Blida	0–3	Mechâal Baladiat Béjaïa	19–25	18–25	15–25	–	–	52–75	Report
12 Dec	15:30	GS Pétroliers WVB	3–0	Nedjmet Riadhi Chlef	25–8	25–14	25–16	–	–	75–38	Report
12 Dec	10:00	Racine Club Béjaïa	0–3	Association Sportive Wilaya Béjaïa	23–25	12–25	13–25	–	–	48–75	Report
13 Dec	10:30	Wydad Olympique Chlef	1–3	Widad Athlétic Tlemcen	23–25	23–25	25–23	23–25	–	94–98	Report
13 Dec	10:00	Nacéria Club Béjaïa	3–1	Seddouk Béjaïa Volleyball	22–25	25–18	25–12	25–23	–	97–78	Report

=== Round 13 ===
Date	Time		Score		Set 1	Set 2	Set 3	Set 4	Set 5	Total	Report
20 Dec	10:00	Nacéria Club Béjaïa	3–1	Association Sportive Ville Blida	25–23	25–14	23–25	25–18	–	98–80	Report
20 Dec	11:30	Association Sportive Wilaya Béjaïa	1–3	GS Pétroliers WVB	25–21	11–25	14–25	19–25	–	69–96	Report
20 Dec	10:00	Widad Athlétic Tlemcen	3–1	Racine Club Béjaïa	22–25	25–17	25–18	25–15	–	97–75	Report
20 Dec	10:00	Seddouk Béjaïa Volleyball	3–0	Wydad Olympique Chlef	25–17	25–17	25–17	–	–	75–51	Report
20 Dec	10:30	Nedjmet Riadhi Chlef	1–3	Mechâal Baladiat Béjaïa	19–25	25–19	20–25	24–26	–	88–95	Report

=== Round 14 ===
Date	Time		Score		Set 1	Set 2	Set 3	Set 4	Set 5	Total	Report
26 Dec	10:00	Association Sportive Ville Blida	1–3	Nedjmet Riadhi Chlef	21–25	22–25	25–19	22–25	–	90–94	Report
26 Dec	10:00	Mechâal Baladiat Béjaïa	2–3	Association Sportive Wilaya Béjaïa	25–23	20–25	25–22	21–25	11–15	102–110	Report
26 Dec	15:30	GS Pétroliers WVB	3–0	Widad Athlétic Tlemcen	25–3	25–16	25–18	–	–	75–37	Report
26 Dec	10:00	Racine Club Béjaïa	1–3	Seddouk Béjaïa Volleyball	25–20	12–25	18–25	14–25	–	69–95	Report
27 Dec	10:30	Wydad Olympique Chlef	1–3	Nacéria Club Béjaïa	25–15	22–25	23–25	15–25	–	85–90	Report

=== Round 15 ===
Date	Time		Score		Set 1	Set 2	Set 3	Set 4	Set 5	Total	Report
03 Jan	10:30	Wydad Olympique Chlef	1–3	Association Sportive Ville Blida	25–20	18–25	17–25	16–25	–	76–95	Report
03 Jan	10:00	Nacéria Club Béjaïa	3–1	Racine Club Béjaïa	27–25	25–18	13–25	25–20	–	90–88	Report
03 Jan	11:30	Association Sportive Wilaya Béjaïa	0–3	Nedjmet Riadhi Chlef	25–27	20–25	19–25	–	–	64–77	Report
03 Jan	10:00	Widad Athlétic Tlemcen	1–3	Mechâal Baladiat Béjaïa	20–25	26–24	21–25	21–25	–	88–99	Report
03 Jan	10:00	Seddouk Béjaïa Volleyball	0–3	GS Pétroliers WVB	19–25	15–25	17–25	–	–	51–75	Report

=== Round 16 ===
Date	Time		Score		Set 1	Set 2	Set 3	Set 4	Set 5	Total	Report
09 Jan	10:00	Racine Club Béjaïa	3–0	Wydad Olympique Chlef	29–27	25–13	25–21	–	–	79–61	Report
10 Jan	10:00	Mechâal Baladiat Béjaïa	3–0	Seddouk Béjaïa Volleyball	25–19	25–20	25–17	–	–	75–56	Report
10 Jan	15:30	GS Pétroliers WVB	3–0	Nacéria Club Béjaïa	25–14	25–18	25–14	–	–	75–46	Report
10 Jan	10:00	Association Sportive Ville Blida	0–3	Association Sportive Wilaya Béjaïa	17–25	23–25	12–25	–	–	52–75	Report
10 Jan	10:30	Nedjmet Riadhi Chlef	3–0	Widad Athlétic Tlemcen	25–17	25–19	25–22	–	–	75–58	Report

=== Round 17 ===
Date	Time		Score		Set 1	Set 2	Set 3	Set 4	Set 5	Total	Report
23 jan	10:00	Racine Club Béjaïa	3–0	Association Sportive Ville Blida	25–21	25–23	25–20	–	–	75–64	Report
24 jan	10:30	Wydad Olympique Chlef	0–3	GS Pétroliers WVB	13–25	15–25	10–25	–	–	38–75	Report
24 jan	10:00	Nacéria Club Béjaïa	0–3	Mechâal Baladiat Béjaïa	9–25	11–25	22–25	–	–	42–75	Report
24 jan	10:00	Seddouk Béjaïa Volleyball	1–3	Nedjmet Riadhi Chlef	22–25	16–25	25–20	28–30	–	91–100	Report
24 jan	10:00	Widad Athlétic Tlemcen	0–3	Association Sportive Wilaya Béjaïa	15–25	18–25	17–25	–	–	50–75	Report

=== Round 18 ===
Date	Time		Score		Set 1	Set 2	Set 3	Set 4	Set 5	Total	Report
06 feb	10:00	Association Sportive Ville Blida	2–3	Widad Athlétic Tlemcen	13–25	16–25	28–26	25–20	15–17	97–113	Report
06 feb	10:00	Mechâal Baladiat Béjaïa	3–0	Wydad Olympique Chlef	25–12	25–21	25–23	–	–	75–56	Report
06 feb	16:00	GS Pétroliers WVB	3–0	Racine Club Béjaïa	25–14	25–22	25–21	–	–	75–57	Report
21 feb	11:00	Nedjmet Riadhi Chlef	–	Nacéria Club Béjaïa	–	–	–	–	–	0–0	[ Report]
21 feb	14:30	Association Sportive Wilaya Béjaïa	–	Seddouk Béjaïa Volleyball	–	–	–	–	–	0–0	[ Report]
