= 2010–11 Algerian Women's Volleyball League =

2010–11 Algerian League
- League: Algerian League
- Sport: Volleyball
- Duration: November 26, 2010 - June __, 2011
- Teams: 10
- League champions: GS Pétroliers WVB (20th title)
- Runners-up: NC Béjaïa

Algerian League seasons
- 2009–10 2011–12

The 2010–11 season of the Algerian Women's Volleyball League was the 49th annual season of the country's highest volleyball level.

== Members of the Algerian Women's Volleyball League (2010–11 season) ==
Team	Location	Hall	Stadium capacity
Mechâal Baladiat Béjaïa	Béjaïa	Salle CSP Amirouche	
GS Pétroliers WVB	Algiers	Salle Hacène Harcha	8.500
Nedjmet Riadhi Chlef	Chlef	Salle Omnisport Mohamed Nasri	
ASW Béjaïa	Béjaïa	Salle Bleue Béjaïa	
NC Béjaïa	Béjaïa	Salle Bleue Béjaïa	
Ghalia Sportif de Chlef	Chlef	Salle Omnisport Mohamed Nasri	
Association Sportive de la Ville Blida	Blida	Salle OM Hocine Chalane	3.000
Jeunesse Sportif Azazga	Azazga	Salle OMS Azzefoun	
Widad Athlétic Tlemcen	Tlemcen	Salle OPOW Tlemcen	
Étoile Sportive Sétifienne	Sétif	Salle 8 Mai 45	

== Regular season ==
Pos	Team	Pld	W	L	Pts	SW	SL	SR	SPW	SPL	SPR	Qualification
1	GS Pétroliers WVB	0	0	0	0	0	0	—	0	0	—	Semi-final
2	Ghalia Sportif de Chlef	0	0	0	0	0	0	—	0	0	—	Semi-final
3	Nedjmet Riadhi Chlef	0	0	0	0	0	0	—	0	0	—	Semi-final
4	Widad Athlétic Tlemcen	0	0	0	0	0	0	—	0	0	—	Semi-final
5	Association Sportive Ville Blida	0	0	0	0	0	0	—	0	0	—	Play Down
6	Nacéria Club Béjaïa	0	0	0	0	0	0	—	0	0	—	Play Down
7	Association Sportive Wilaya Béjaïa	0	0	0	0	0	0	—	0	0	—	Play Down
8	Mechâal Baladiat Béjaïa	0	0	0	0	0	0	—	0	0	—	Play Down
9	Jeunesse Sportif Azazga	0	0	0	0	0	0	—	0	0	—	Play Down
10	Étoile Sportive Sétifienne	0	0	0	0	0	0	—	0	0	—	Play Down

=== Round 1 ===
Date	Time		Score		Set 1	Set 2	Set 3	Set 4	Set 5	Total	Report
26 Nov	10:00	Nacéria Club Béjaïa	3–0	Association Sportive Ville Blida	25–16	25–21	25–19	–	–	75–56	Report
27 Nov	10:00	GS Pétroliers WVB	3–0	Jeunesse Sportif Azazga	25–8	25–15	25–11	–	–	75–34	Report
27 Nov	10:00	Association Sportive Wilaya Béjaïa	1–3	Nedjmet Riadhi Chlef	25–15	18–25	16–25	20–25	–	79–90	Report
27 Nov	10:00	Ghalia Sportif Chlef	3–0	Étoile Sportive Sétifienne	25–8	25–3	25–15	–	–	75–26	Report
27 Nov	10:00	Mechâal Baladiat Béjaïa	3–0	Widad Athlétic Tlemcen	25–15	25–13	25–12	–	–	75–40	Report

=== Round 2 ===
Date	Time		Score		Set 1	Set 2	Set 3	Set 4	Set 5	Total	Report
03 Dec	15:00	Étoile Sportive Sétifienne	0–3	Mechâal Baladiat Béjaïa	0–25	0–25	0–25	–	–	0–75	Report
04 Dec	10:30	GS Pétroliers WVB	3–0	Nacéria Club Béjaïa	25–18	25–20	25–17	–	–	75–55	Report
04 Dec	10:30	Nedjmet Riadhi Chlef	3–2	Ghalia Sportif Chlef	26–28	25–13	13–25	25–18	15–12	104–96	Report
04 Dec	10:30	Association Sportive Ville Blida	0–3	Association Sportive Wilaya Béjaïa	9–25	23–25	22–25	–	–	54–75	Report
04 Dec	10:30	Jeunesse Sportif Azazga	3–0	Widad Athlétic Tlemcen	27–25	25–16	32–30	–	–	84–71	Report

=== Round 3 ===
Date	Time		Score		Set 1	Set 2	Set 3	Set 4	Set 5	Total	Report
17 Dec	10:00	Ghalia Sportif Chlef	3–1	Association Sportive Ville Blida	25–15	25–15	22–25	25–14	–	97–69	Report
18 Dec	10:00	Nacéria Club Béjaïa	3–1	Jeunesse Sportif Azazga	25–19	19–25	25–13	25–15	–	94–72	Report
18 Dec	10:00	Association Sportive Wilaya Béjaïa	1–3	GS Pétroliers WVB	12–25	25–23	4–25	14–25	–	55–98	Report
18 Dec	10:00	Mechâal Baladiat Béjaïa	3–1	Nedjmet Riadhi Chlef	26–28	27–25	25–23	25–19	–	103–95	Report
18 Dec	10:00	Widad Athlétic Tlemcen	3–0	Étoile Sportive Sétifienne	25–0	25–0	25–0	–	–	75–0	Report

=== Round 4 ===
Date	Time		Score		Set 1	Set 2	Set 3	Set 4	Set 5	Total	Report
25 Dec	10:30	Jeunesse Sportif Azazga	3–0	Étoile Sportive Sétifienne	25–0	25–0	25–0	–	–	75–0	Report
25 Dec	10:30	Nedjmet Riadhi Chlef	3–0	Widad Athlétic Tlemcen	25–11	25–15	25–15	–	–	75–41	Report
25 Dec	10:30	Association Sportive Ville Blida	1–3	Mechâal Baladiat Béjaïa	14–25	22–25	26–24	14–25	–	76–99	Report
25 Dec	10:30	GS Pétroliers WVB	3–1	Ghalia Sportif Chlef	24–26	25–21	25–12	25–14	–	99–73	Report
25 Dec	10:30	Nacéria Club Béjaïa	3–0	Association Sportive Wilaya Béjaïa	25–13	25–20	25–21	–	–	75–54	Report

=== Round 5 ===
Date	Time		Score		Set 1	Set 2	Set 3	Set 4	Set 5	Total	Report
08 Jan	10:30	Association Sportive Wilaya Béjaïa	–	Jeunesse Sportif Azazga	–	–	–	–	–	0–0	[ Report]
08 Jan	10:30	Ghalia Sportif Chlef	–	Nacéria Club Béjaïa	–	–	–	–	–	0–0	[ Report]
08 Jan	10:30	Widad Athlétic Tlemcen	–	Association Sportive Ville Blida	–	–	–	–	–	0–0	[ Report]
08 Jan	10:30	Mechâal Baladiat Béjaïa	–	GS Pétroliers WVB	–	–	–	–	–	0–0	[ Report]

=== Round 6 ===
Date	Time		Score		Set 1	Set 2	Set 3	Set 4	Set 5	Total	Report
15 Jan	10:30	Jeunesse Sportif Azazga	–	Nedjmet Riadhi Chlef	–	–	–	–	–	0–0	[ Report]
15 Jan	10:30	GS Pétroliers WVB	–	Widad Athlétic Tlemcen	–	–	–	–	–	0–0	[ Report]
15 Jan	10:30	Association Sportive Wilaya Béjaïa	–	Ghalia Sportif Chlef	–	–	–	–	–	0–0	[ Report]
15 Jan	12:00	Nacéria Club Béjaïa	–	Mechâal Baladiat Béjaïa	–	–	–	–	–	0–0	[ Report]

=== Round 7 ===
Date	Time		Score		Set 1	Set 2	Set 3	Set 4	Set 5	Total	Report
22 Jan	10:30	Ghalia Sportif Chlef	–	Jeunesse Sportif Azazga	–	–	–	–	–	0–0	[ Report]
22 Jan	10:30	Mechâal Baladiat Béjaïa	–	Association Sportive Wilaya Béjaïa	–	–	–	–	–	0–0	[ Report]
22 Jan	10:30	Widad Athlétic Tlemcen	–	Nacéria Club Béjaïa	–	–	–	–	–	0–0	[ Report]
22 Jan	10:30	Nedjmet Riadhi Chlef	–	Association Sportive Ville Blida	–	–	–	–	–	0–0	[ Report]

=== Round 8 ===
Date	Time		Score		Set 1	Set 2	Set 3	Set 4	Set 5	Total	Report
11 Feb	10:00	Jeunesse Sportif Azazga	–	Association Sportive Ville Blida	–	–	–	–	–	0–0	[ Report]
11 Feb	10:00	GS Pétroliers WVB	–	Nedjmet Riadhi Chlef	–	–	–	–	–	0–0	[ Report]
11 Feb	10:00	Association Sportive Wilaya Béjaïa	–	Widad Athlétic Tlemcen	–	–	–	–	–	0–0	[ Report]
11 Feb	10:00	Ghalia Sportif Chlef	–	Mechâal Baladiat Béjaïa	–	–	–	–	–	0–0	[ Report]

=== Round 9 ===
Date	Time		Score		Set 1	Set 2	Set 3	Set 4	Set 5	Total	Report
25 Feb	10:00	Mechâal Baladiat Béjaïa	–	Jeunesse Sportif Azazga	–	–	–	–	–	0–0	[ Report]
25 Feb	10:00	Widad Athlétic Tlemcen	–	Ghalia Sportif Chlef	–	–	–	–	–	0–0	[ Report]
25 Feb	10:00	Nedjmet Riadhi Chlef	–	Nacéria Club Béjaïa	–	–	–	–	–	0–0	[ Report]
25 Feb	10:00	Association Sportive Ville Blida	–	GS Pétroliers WVB	–	–	–	–	–	0–0	[ Report]

=== Round 10 ===
Date	Time		Score		Set 1	Set 2	Set 3	Set 4	Set 5	Total	Report
04 Mar	10:00	Jeunesse Sportif Azazga	–	GS Pétroliers WVB	–	–	–	–	–	0–0	[ Report]
04 Mar	10:00	Association Sportive Ville Blida	–	Nacéria Club Béjaïa	–	–	–	–	–	0–0	[ Report]
04 Mar	10:00	Nedjmet Riadhi Chlef	–	Association Sportive Wilaya Béjaïa	–	–	–	–	–	0–0	[ Report]
04 Mar	10:00	Widad Athlétic Tlemcen	–	Mechâal Baladiat Béjaïa	–	–	–	–	–	0–0	[ Report]

=== Round 11 ===
Date	Time		Score		Set 1	Set 2	Set 3	Set 4	Set 5	Total	Report
11 Mar	10:00	Widad Athlétic Tlemcen	–	Jeunesse Sportif Azazga	–	–	–	–	–	0–0	[ Report]
11 Mar	10:00	Ghalia Sportif Chlef	–	Nedjmet Riadhi Chlef	–	–	–	–	–	0–0	[ Report]
11 Mar	10:00	Association Sportive Wilaya Béjaïa	–	Association Sportive Ville Blida	–	–	–	–	–	0–0	[ Report]
11 Mar	10:00	Nacéria Club Béjaïa	–	GS Pétroliers WVB	–	–	–	–	–	0–0	[ Report]

=== Round 12 ===
Date	Time		Score		Set 1	Set 2	Set 3	Set 4	Set 5	Total	Report
08 Apr	10:00	Jeunesse Sportif Azazga	–	Nacéria Club Béjaïa	–	–	–	–	–	0–0	[ Report]
08 Apr	10:00	GS Pétroliers WVB	–	Association Sportive Wilaya Béjaïa	–	–	–	–	–	0–0	[ Report]
08 Apr	10:00	Association Sportive Ville Blida	–	Ghalia Sportif Chlef	–	–	–	–	–	0–0	[ Report]
08 Apr	10:00	Nedjmet Riadhi Chlef	–	Mechâal Baladiat Béjaïa	–	–	–	–	–	0–0	[ Report]

=== Round 13 ===
Date	Time		Score		Set 1	Set 2	Set 3	Set 4	Set 5	Total	Report
15 Apr	10:00	Widad Athlétic Tlemcen	–	Nedjmet Riadhi Chlef	–	–	–	–	–	0–0	[ Report]
15 Apr	10:00	Mechâal Baladiat Béjaïa	–	Association Sportive Ville Blida	–	–	–	–	–	0–0	[ Report]
15 Apr	10:00	Ghalia Sportif Chlef	–	GS Pétroliers WVB	–	–	–	–	–	0–0	[ Report]
15 Apr	10:00	Association Sportive Wilaya Béjaïa	–	Nacéria Club Béjaïa	–	–	–	–	–	0–0	[ Report]

=== Round 14 ===
Date	Time		Score		Set 1	Set 2	Set 3	Set 4	Set 5	Total	Report
22 Apr	10:00	Jeunesse Sportif Azazga	–	Association Sportive Wilaya Béjaïa	–	–	–	–	–	0–0	[ Report]
22 Apr	10:00	Nacéria Club Béjaïa	–	Ghalia Sportif Chlef	–	–	–	–	–	0–0	[ Report]
22 Apr	10:00	GS Pétroliers WVB	–	Mechâal Baladiat Béjaïa	–	–	–	–	–	0–0	[ Report]
22 Apr	10:00	Association Sportive Ville Blida	–	Widad Athlétic Tlemcen	–	–	–	–	–	0–0	[ Report]

=== Round 15 ===
Date	Time		Score		Set 1	Set 2	Set 3	Set 4	Set 5	Total	Report
13 May	10:00	Nedjmet Riadhi Chlef	–	Jeunesse Sportif Azazga	–	–	–	–	–	0–0	[ Report]
13 May	10:00	Widad Athlétic Tlemcen	–	GS Pétroliers WVB	–	–	–	–	–	0–0	[ Report]
13 May	10:00	Mechâal Baladiat Béjaïa	–	Nacéria Club Béjaïa	–	–	–	–	–	0–0	[ Report]
13 May	10:00	Ghalia Sportif Chlef	–	Association Sportive Wilaya Béjaïa	–	–	–	–	–	0–0	[ Report]

=== Round 16 ===
Date	Time		Score		Set 1	Set 2	Set 3	Set 4	Set 5	Total	Report
20 May	10:00	Jeunesse Sportif Azazga	–	Ghalia Sportif Chlef	–	–	–	–	–	0–0	[ Report]
20 May	10:00	Association Sportive Wilaya Béjaïa	–	Mechâal Baladiat Béjaïa	–	–	–	–	–	0–0	[ Report]
20 May	10:00	Nacéria Club Béjaïa	–	Widad Athlétic Tlemcen	–	–	–	–	–	0–0	[ Report]
20 May	10:00	Association Sportive Ville Blida	–	Nedjmet Riadhi Chlef	–	–	–	–	–	0–0	[ Report]

=== Round 17 ===
Date	Time		Score		Set 1	Set 2	Set 3	Set 4	Set 5	Total	Report
03 Jun	10:00	Association Sportive Ville Blida	–	Jeunesse Sportif Azazga	–	–	–	–	–	0–0	[ Report]
03 Jun	10:00	Nedjmet Riadhi Chlef	–	GS Pétroliers WVB	–	–	–	–	–	0–0	[ Report]
03 Jun	10:00	Widad Athlétic Tlemcen	–	Association Sportive Wilaya Béjaïa	–	–	–	–	–	0–0	[ Report]
03 Jun	10:00	Mechâal Baladiat Béjaïa	–	Ghalia Sportif Chlef	–	–	–	–	–	0–0	[ Report]

=== Round 18 ===
Date	Time		Score		Set 1	Set 2	Set 3	Set 4	Set 5	Total	Report
10 Jun	10:00	Jeunesse Sportif Azazga	–	Mechâal Baladiat Béjaïa	–	–	–	–	–	0–0	[ Report]
10 Jun	10:00	Ghalia Sportif Chlef	–	Widad Athlétic Tlemcen	–	–	–	–	–	0–0	[ Report]
10 Jun	10:00	Nacéria Club Béjaïa	–	Nedjmet Riadhi Chlef	–	–	–	–	–	0–0	[ Report]
10 Jun	10:00	GS Pétroliers WVB	–	Association Sportive Ville Blida	–	–	–	–	–	0–0	[ Report]
