= 2016–17 Algerian Women's Volleyball League =

2016–17 Algerian League
- League: Algerian League
- Sport: Volleyball
- Duration: September ?, 2016 - March 24, 2017
- Teams: 10
- League champions: GS Pétroliers WVB (27th title)
- Runners-up: NC Béjaïa

Algerian League seasons
- ← 2015–16 2017–18 →

The 2016–17 season of the Algerian Women's Volleyball League was the 55th annual season of the country's highest volleyball level.

== Members of the Algerian Women's Volleyball League (2016–17 season) ==
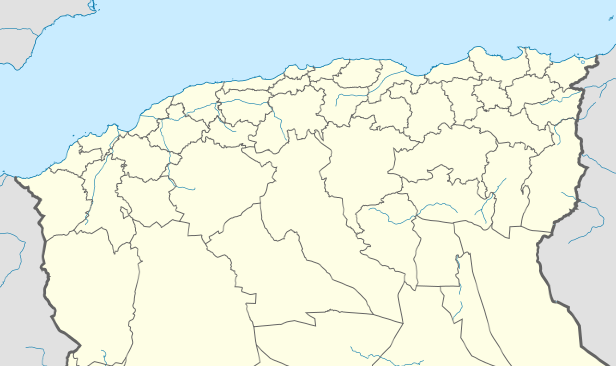
Locations of the 2016–17 AWVL teams in Northern Algeria

Team	Location	Hall	Stadium capacity
Mechâal Baladiat Béjaïa	Béjaïa	Salle CSP Amirouche	
GS Pétroliers WVB	Algiers	Salle Hacène Harcha	8.500
Nedjmet Riadhi Chlef	Chlef	Salle OMS Chettia	
ASW Béjaïa	Béjaïa	Salle Bleue Béjaïa	
NC Béjaïa	Béjaïa	Salle Bleue Béjaïa	
WAB	Béjaïa	Salle OPOW Béjaïa	
Association Sportive Ville Blida	Blida	Salle OM Hocine Chalane	3.000
Seddouk Béjaïa Volleyball	El-Kseur	Salle CSP Berchiche El-Kseur	
Widad Athlétic Tlemcen	Tlemcen	Salle OPOW Tlemcen	
Racine Club Béjaïa	Béjaïa	Salle OPOW Béjaïa	

== Regular season ==
Pos	Team	Pld	W	L	Pts	SW	SL	SR	SPW	SPL	SPR	Qualification or relegation
1	GS Pétroliers WVB	17	17	0	51	51	8	6.375	1479	1046	1.414	Champions
2	Nacéria Club Béjaïa	17	14	3	37	46	24	1.917	1571	1319	1.191	
3	Mechâal Baladiat Béjaïa	17	13	4	37	43	22	1.955	1486	1308	1.136	
4	Association Sportive Wilaya Béjaïa	17	9	8	27	34	32	1.063	1429	1353	1.056	
5	Seddouk Béjaïa Volleyball	17	8	9	27	37	32	1.156	1470	1471	0.999	
6	Nedjmet Riadhi Chlef	17	9	8	26	35	31	1.129	1443	1387	1.040	
7	Racine Club Béjaïa	17	6	11	21	30	37	0.811	1425	1093	1.304	
8	WAB	17	6	11	18	25	41	0.610	1365	1463	0.933	
9	Widad Athlétic Tlemcen	17	3	14	10	14	42	0.333	1164	1339	0.869	Relegated to League 2
10	Association Sportive Ville Blida	17	0	17	1	4	51	0.078	948	1354	0.700	Relegated to League 2
