= Algerian Volleyball League =

Algerian Volleyball League may refer to:

- Algerian Men's Volleyball League
- Algerian Women's Volleyball League
