= 2012–13 Algerian Women's Volleyball League =

2012–13 Algerian League
- League: Algerian League
- Sport: Volleyball
- Duration: October 19, 2012 -June 15, 2013
- Teams: 10
- League champions: GS Pétroliers WVB (23rd title)
- Runners-up: Nedjmet Riadhi Chlef

Algerian League seasons
- 2011–12 2013–14

The 2012–13 season of the Algerian Women's Volleyball League was the 51st annual season of the country's highest volleyball level.

== Members of the Algerian Women's Volleyball League (2012–13 season) ==
Team	Location	Hall	Stadium capacity
Mechâal Baladiat Béjaïa	Béjaïa	Salle CSP Amirouche	
GS Pétroliers WVB	Algiers	Salle Hacène Harcha	8.500
Nedjmet Riadhi Chlef	Chlef	Salle OMS Chettia	
ASW Béjaïa	Béjaïa	Salle Bleue Béjaïa	
NC Béjaïa	Béjaïa	Salle Bleue Béjaïa	
Wydad Olympique Chlef	Chlef	Salle OMS Chettia	
Raed Itihad Jameat El Jazair	Algiers	Salle OMS Douera	
Seddouk Béjaïa Volleyball	El-Kseur	Salle CSP Berchiche El-Kseur	
Racine Club Béjaïa	Béjaïa	Salle OPOW Béjaïa	
Association Sportive de la Ville Blida	Blida	Salle OM Hocine Chalane	3.000

== Regular season ==
Pos	Team	Pld	W	L	Pts	SW	SL	SR	SPW	SPL	SPR	Qualification
1	GS Pétroliers WVB	18	17	1	51	53	7	7.571	1452	1046	1.388	Semi-final
2	Mechâal Baladiat Béjaïa	18	17	1	51	53	10	5.300	1431	1063	1.346	Semi-final
3	Nedjmet Riadhi Chlef	18	13	5	37	39	23	1.696	1326	1212	1.094	Semi-final
4	Association Sportive Wilaya Béjaïa	18	11	7	34	38	22	1.727	1342	1222	1.098	Semi-final
5	Wydad Olympique Chlef	18	11	7	31	37	30	1.233	1452	1426	1.018	Play Down
6	Seddouk Béjaïa Volleyball	18	6	12	18	24	40	0.600	1185	1381	0.858	Play Down
7	Nacéria Club Béjaïa	18	5	13	17	21	44	0.477	1237	1401	0.883	Play Down
8	Association Sportive Ville Blida	18	4	14	12	21	46	0.457	1238	1369	0.904	Play Down
9	Raed Itihad Jameat El Jazair	18	3	15	11	16	47	0.340	1245	1464	0.850	Play Down
10	Racine Club Béjaïa	18	3	15	8	15	48	0.313	1150	1418	0.811	Play Down

=== Round 1 ===
Date	Time		Score		Set 1	Set 2	Set 3	Set 4	Set 5	Total	Report
19 Oct	10:30	Mechâal Baladiat Béjaïa	3–1	Wydad Olympique Chlef	25–20	25–17	25–27	25–20	–	100–84	
19 Oct	10:30	GS Pétroliers WVB	3–0	Racine Club Béjaïa	25–17	25–18	25–20	–	–	75–55	
20 Oct	10:00	Nedjmet Riadhi Chlef	3–0	Raed Itihad Jameat El Jazair	25–19	25–18	26–24	–	–	76–61	
20 Oct	10:00	Nacéria Club Béjaïa	3–1	Association Sportive Ville Blida	25–19	18–25	25–19	25–16	–	93–79	
20 Oct	11:30	Association Sportive Wilaya Béjaïa	3–1	Seddouk Béjaïa Volleyball	25–22	26–28	25–15	25–7	–	101–72	

=== Round 2 ===
Date	Time		Score		Set 1	Set 2	Set 3	Set 4	Set 5	Total	Report
09 Nov	15:00	Mechâal Baladiat Béjaïa	3–2	GS Pétroliers WVB	23–25	25–10	26–28	30–28	15–10	119–101	
09 Nov	10:30	Raed Itihad Jameat El Jazair	3–0	Nacéria Club Béjaïa	25–19	25–23	25–14	–	–	75–56	
09 Nov	11:00	Wydad Olympique Chlef	3–0	Seddouk Béjaïa Volleyball	25–18	25–20	25–21	–	–	75–59	
10 Nov	10:00	Association Sportive Ville Blida	0–3	Association Sportive Wilaya Béjaïa	7–25	16–25	14–25	–	–	37–75	
10 Nov	11:00	Racine Club Béjaïa	1–3	Nedjmet Riadhi Chlef	23–25	24–26	25–19	14–25	–	86–95	

=== Round 3 ===
Date	Time		Score		Set 1	Set 2	Set 3	Set 4	Set 5	Total	Report
17 Nov	10:00	Nedjmet Riadhi Chlef	0–3	Mechâal Baladiat Béjaïa	21–25	18–25	17–25	–	–	56–75	
17 Nov	10:30	GS Pétroliers WVB	3–1	Wydad Olympique Chlef	25–22	25–20	23–25	25–12	–	98–79	
17 Nov	10:00	Nacéria Club Béjaïa	3–1	Racine Club Béjaïa	20–25	25–19	25–11	25–13	–	95–68	
16 Nov	10:30	Association Sportive Wilaya Béjaïa	3–0	Raed Itihad Jameat El Jazair	25–13	25–19	26–24	–	–	76–56	
17 Nov	11:00	Seddouk Béjaïa Volleyball	3–0	Association Sportive Ville Blida	25–21	25–23	25–13	–	–	75–57	

=== Round 4 ===
Date	Time		Score		Set 1	Set 2	Set 3	Set 4	Set 5	Total	Report
07 Dec	10:30	Raed Itihad Jameat El Jazair	3–1	Seddouk Béjaïa Volleyball	19–25	25–9	28–26	25–16	–	97–76	
07 Dec	16:30	GS Pétroliers WVB	3–0	Nedjmet Riadhi Chlef	25–19	25–19	25–17	–	–	75–55	
07 Dec	18:00	Mechâal Baladiat Béjaïa	3–0	Nacéria Club Béjaïa	25–20	29–27	25–10	–	–	79–57	
07 Dec	10:30	Wydad Olympique Chlef	3–0	Association Sportive Ville Blida	26–24	25–22	25–17	–	–	76–63	
08 Dec	11:00	Racine Club Béjaïa	0–3	Association Sportive Wilaya Béjaïa	8–25	15–25	14–25	–	–	37–75	

=== Round 5 ===
Date	Time		Score		Set 1	Set 2	Set 3	Set 4	Set 5	Total	Report
05 Jan	10:00	Nedjmet Riadhi Chlef	0–3	Wydad Olympique Chlef	24–26	13–25	19–25	–	–	56–76	
05 Jan	09:00	Nacéria Club Béjaïa	0–3	GS Pétroliers WVB	23–25	16–25	20–25	–	–	59–75	
05 Jan	11:00	Association Sportive Wilaya Béjaïa	1–3	Mechâal Baladiat Béjaïa	20–25	13–25	25–22	18–25	–	76–97	
04 Jan	10:00	Association Sportive Ville Blida	3–1	Raed Itihad Jameat El Jazair	25–27	25–23	25–19	25–14	–	100–83	
05 Jan	14:30	Seddouk Béjaïa Volleyball	3–1	Racine Club Béjaïa	13–25	25–19	25–23	25–22	–	88–89	

=== Round 6 ===
Date	Time		Score		Set 1	Set 2	Set 3	Set 4	Set 5	Total	Report
11 Jan	15:00	Mechâal Baladiat Béjaïa	3–0	Seddouk Béjaïa Volleyball	25–15	26–24	25–13	–	–	76–52	
11 Jan	15:30	GS Pétroliers WVB	3–0	Association Sportive Wilaya Béjaïa	25–16	25–11	25–16	–	–	75–43	
12 Jan	11:30	Wydad Olympique Chlef	3–0	Raed Itihad Jameat El Jazair	25–20	25–20	25–19	–	–	75–59	
12 Jan	11:00	Racine Club Béjaïa	0–3	Association Sportive Ville Blida	16–25	20–25	22–25	–	–	58–75	
12 Jan	10:00	Nedjmet Riadhi Chlef	3–0	Nacéria Club Béjaïa	25–20	25–21	25–23	–	–	75–64	

=== Round 7 ===
Date	Time		Score		Set 1	Set 2	Set 3	Set 4	Set 5	Total	Report
18 Jan	15:00	Raed Itihad Jameat El Jazair	3–1	Racine Club Béjaïa	22–25	25–21	25–14	25–22	–	97–82	
18 Jan	15:00	Association Sportive Ville Blida	1–3	Mechâal Baladiat Béjaïa	25–20	11–25	25–14	25–22	–	86–81	
19 Jan	09:00	Nacéria Club Béjaïa	1–3	Wydad Olympique Chlef	23–25	21–25	25–18	21–25	–	90–93	
19 Jan	11:00	Association Sportive Wilaya Béjaïa	2–3	Nedjmet Riadhi Chlef	25–13	25–21	13–25	25–27	14–16	102–102	
18 Jan	15:00	Seddouk Béjaïa Volleyball	0–3	GS Pétroliers WVB	13–25	18–25	14–25	–	–	45–75	

=== Round 8 ===
Date	Time		Score		Set 1	Set 2	Set 3	Set 4	Set 5	Total	Report
01 Feb	11:00	Mechâal Baladiat Béjaïa	3–0	Raed Itihad Jameat El Jazair	25–15	25–14	25–14	–	–	75–43	
01 Feb	15:00	GS Pétroliers WVB	3–1	Association Sportive Ville Blida	18–25	25–14	25–20	25–11	–	93–70	
02 Feb	09:30	Nedjmet Riadhi Chlef	3–0	Seddouk Béjaïa Volleyball	26–24	25–14	25–18	–	–	76–56	
02 Feb	11:00	Wydad Olympique Chlef	3–1	Racine Club Béjaïa	25–15	25–16	22–25	25–23	–	97–79	
02 Feb	10:30	Nacéria Club Béjaïa	0–3	Association Sportive Wilaya Béjaïa	29–31	22–25	17–25	–	–	68–81	

=== Round 9 ===
Date	Time		Score		Set 1	Set 2	Set 3	Set 4	Set 5	Total	Report
08 Feb	15:00	Raed Itihad Jameat El Jazair	0–3	GS Pétroliers WVB	21–25	17–25	19–25	–	–	57–75	
09 Feb	10:00	Association Sportive Ville Blida	1–3	Nedjmet Riadhi Chlef	8–25	25–22	15–25	11–25	–	59–97	
09 Feb	10:00	Association Sportive Wilaya Béjaïa	3–0	Wydad Olympique Chlef	25–14	25–22	25–20	–	–	75–56	
09 Feb	14:30	Seddouk Béjaïa Volleyball	3–1	Nacéria Club Béjaïa	25–22	22–25	25–22	25–14	–	97–83	
09 Feb	11:00	Racine Club Béjaïa	0–3	Mechâal Baladiat Béjaïa	18–25	13–25	10–25	–	–	41–75	

=== Round 10 ===
Date	Time		Score		Set 1	Set 2	Set 3	Set 4	Set 5	Total	Report
22 Feb	..:..	Association Sportive Ville Blida	1–3	Nacéria Club Béjaïa	23–25	25–21	22–25	18–25	–	88–96	
23 Feb	..:..	Racine Club Béjaïa	0–3	GS Pétroliers WVB	10–25	13–25	11–25	–	–	34–75	
23 Feb	..:..	Seddouk Béjaïa Volleyball	0–3	Association Sportive Wilaya Béjaïa	16–25	16–25	20–25	–	–	52–75	
23 Feb	..:..	Wydad Olympique Chlef	0–3	Mechâal Baladiat Béjaïa	23–25	13–25	17–25	–	–	53–75	
23 Feb	..:..	Raed Itihad Jameat El Jazair	0–3	Nedjmet Riadhi Chlef	22–25	22–25	19–25	–	–	63–75	

=== Round 11 ===
Date	Time		Score		Set 1	Set 2	Set 3	Set 4	Set 5	Total	Report
22 Mar	15:00	GS Pétroliers WVB	3–2	Mechâal Baladiat Béjaïa	25–14	17–25	25–27	25–22	15–10	107–98	
23 Mar	10:00	Nedjmet Riadhi Chlef	3–0	Racine Club Béjaïa	–	–	–	–	–	0–0	
23 Mar	10:00	Nacéria Club Béjaïa	3–1	Raed Itihad Jameat El Jazair	16–25	25–21	25–20	25–21	–	91–87	
23 Mar	11:30	Association Sportive Wilaya Béjaïa	3–0	Association Sportive Ville Blida	25–18	25–17	26–24	–	–	76–59	
23 Mar	14:30	Seddouk Béjaïa Volleyball	1–3	Wydad Olympique Chlef	24–26	11–25	25–22	20–25	–	80–98	

=== Round 12 ===
Date	Time		Score		Set 1	Set 2	Set 3	Set 4	Set 5	Total	Report
29 Mar	10:00	Wydad Olympique Chlef	0–3	GS Pétroliers WVB	–	–	–	–	–	0–0	
29 Mar	10:00	Mechâal Baladiat Béjaïa	3–0	Nedjmet Riadhi Chlef	–	–	–	–	–	0–0	
29 Mar	11:00	Racine Club Béjaïa	1–3	Nacéria Club Béjaïa	–	–	–	–	–	0–0	
29 Mar	10:30	Raed Itihad Jameat El Jazair	0–3	Association Sportive Wilaya Béjaïa	–	–	–	–	–	0–0	
29 Mar	10:30	Association Sportive Ville Blida	3–2	Seddouk Béjaïa Volleyball	–	–	–	–	–	0–0	

=== Round 13 ===
Date	Time		Score		Set 1	Set 2	Set 3	Set 4	Set 5	Total	Report
19 Apr	15:00	Association Sportive Ville Blida	2–3	Wydad Olympique Chlef	20–25	25–20	17–25	25–13	13–15	100–98	
20 Apr	10:00	Nedjmet Riadhi Chlef	0–3	GS Pétroliers WVB	18–25	17–25	21–25	–	–	56–75	
23 Apr	15:00	Nacéria Club Béjaïa	0–3	Mechâal Baladiat Béjaïa	26–28	14–25	18–25	–	–	58–78	
20 Apr	11:00	Association Sportive Wilaya Béjaïa	3–0	Racine Club Béjaïa	25–17	25–17	25–11	–	–	75–45	
20 Apr	14:30	Seddouk Béjaïa Volleyball	0–3	Raed Itihad Jameat El Jazair	20–25	18–25	22–25	–	–	60–75	

=== Round 14 ===
Date	Time		Score		Set 1	Set 2	Set 3	Set 4	Set 5	Total	Report
01 May	10:00	GS Pétroliers WVB	3–0	Nacéria Club Béjaïa	25–23	25–9	25–17	–	–	75–49	
01 May	11:30	Raed Itihad Jameat El Jazair	1–3	Association Sportive Ville Blida	24–26	25–22	19–25	24–26	–	92–99	
01 May	15:00	Mechâal Baladiat Béjaïa	3–1	Association Sportive Wilaya Béjaïa	17–25	25–23	25–16	25–20	–	92–84	
01 May	15:00	Wydad Olympique Chlef	2–3	Nedjmet Riadhi Chlef	25–19	15–25	25–21	17–25	13–15	95–105	
01 May	15:00	Racine Club Béjaïa	0–3	Seddouk Béjaïa Volleyball	22–25	22–25	23–25	–	–	67–75	

=== Round 15 ===
Date	Time		Score		Set 1	Set 2	Set 3	Set 4	Set 5	Total	Report
03 May	12:00	Association Sportive Ville Blida	1–3	Racine Club Béjaïa	25–22	18–25	26–28	25–27	–	94–102	
04 May	14:30	Raed Itihad Jameat El Jazair	2–3	Wydad Olympique Chlef	25–17	20–25	25–22	19–25	2–15	91–104	
04 May	10:00	Nacéria Club Béjaïa	0–3	Nedjmet Riadhi Chlef	16–25	13–25	13–25	–	–	42–75	
04 May	11:30	Association Sportive Wilaya Béjaïa	0–3	GS Pétroliers WVB	9–25	19–25	10–25	–	–	38–75	
04 May	10:30	Seddouk Béjaïa Volleyball	0–3	Mechâal Baladiat Béjaïa	15–25	16–25	17–25	–	–	48–75	

=== Round 16 ===
Date	Time		Score		Set 1	Set 2	Set 3	Set 4	Set 5	Total	Report
10 May	17:00	GS Pétroliers WVB	3–0	Seddouk Béjaïa Volleyball	25–14	25–18	25–17	–	–	75–49	
10 May	10:30	Mechâal Baladiat Béjaïa	3–1	Association Sportive Ville Blida	–	–	–	–	–	0–0	
11 May	10:00	Wydad Olympique Chlef	3–2	Nacéria Club Béjaïa	27–29	25–10	25–15	26–28	15–10	118–92	
11 May	11:30	Nedjmet Riadhi Chlef	3–1	Association Sportive Wilaya Béjaïa	25–16	25–19	23–25	26–24	–	99–84	
11 May	10:30	Racine Club Béjaïa	3–2	Raed Itihad Jameat El Jazair	17–25	25–13	20–25	25–14	16–14	103–91	

=== Round 17 ===
Date	Time		Score		Set 1	Set 2	Set 3	Set 4	Set 5	Total	Report
17 May	10:00	Raed Itihad Jameat El Jazair	0–3	Mechâal Baladiat Béjaïa	3–25	11–25	11–25	–	–	25–75	
17 May	15:00	Association Sportive Ville Blida	0–3	GS Pétroliers WVB	17–25	13–25	26–28	–	–	56–78	
18 May	10:00	Association Sportive Wilaya Béjaïa	3–0	Nacéria Club Béjaïa	25–23	25–10	25–14	–	–	75–47	
18 May	10:30	Seddouk Béjaïa Volleyball	1–3	Nedjmet Riadhi Chlef	24–26	25–20	19–25	16–25	–	84–96	
18 May	10:30	Racine Club Béjaïa	3–0	Wydad Olympique Chlef	25–23	25–20	25–20	–	–	75–63	

=== Round 18 ===
Date	Time		Score		Set 1	Set 2	Set 3	Set 4	Set 5	Total	Report
31 May	16:00	GS Pétroliers WVB	3–0	Raed Itihad Jameat El Jazair	–	–	–	–	–	0–0	
31 May	15:00	Mechâal Baladiat Béjaïa	3–0	Racine Club Béjaïa	–	–	–	–	–	0–0	
01 Jun	10:00	Wydad Olympique Chlef	3–0	Association Sportive Wilaya Béjaïa	–	–	–	–	–	0–0	
01 Jun	11:30	Nedjmet Riadhi Chlef	3–0	Association Sportive Ville Blida	–	–	–	–	–	0–0	
01 Jun	10:00	Nacéria Club Béjaïa	2–3	Seddouk Béjaïa Volleyball	–	–	–	–	–	0–0	

== Semi-final ==
Date	Time		Score		Set 1	Set 2	Set 3	Set 4	Set 5	Total	Report
07 Jun	15:00	Association Sportive Wilaya Béjaïa	0–3	GS Pétroliers WVB	14–25	12–25	20–25	–	–	46–75	
07 Jun	15:00	Nedjmet Riadhi Chlef	3–0	Mechâal Baladiat Béjaïa	25–21	25–22	25–20	–	–	75–63	

Date	Time		Score		Set 1	Set 2	Set 3	Set 4	Set 5	Total	Report
08 Jun	15:00	GS Pétroliers WVB	3–0	Association Sportive Wilaya Béjaïa	25–16	26–24	25–9	–	–	76–49	
08 Jun	15:00	Mechâal Baladiat Béjaïa	3–1	Nedjmet Riadhi Chlef	–	–	–	–	–	0–0	

== 3rd place ==
Date	Time		Score		Set 1	Set 2	Set 3	Set 4	Set 5	Total	Report
14 Jun	15:00	Mechâal Baladiat Béjaïa	3–1	Association Sportive Wilaya Béjaïa	–	–	–	–	–	0–0	
15 Jun	14:00	Association Sportive Wilaya Béjaïa	2–3	Mechâal Baladiat Béjaïa	–	–	–	–	–	0–0	

== Final ==
Date	Time		Score		Set 1	Set 2	Set 3	Set 4	Set 5	Total	Report
14 Jun	16:30	GS Pétroliers WVB	3–0	Nedjmet Riadhi Chlef	–	–	–	–	–	0–0	
15 Jun	16:30	Nedjmet Riadhi Chlef	0–3	GS Pétroliers WVB	–	–	–	–	–	0–0	

== Play Down ==
Pos	Team	Pld	W	L	Pts	SW	SL	SR	SPW	SPL	SPR	Relegation
5	Seddouk Béjaïa Volleyball	23	11	12	33	39	41	0.951	1335	1495	0.893	
6	Wydad Olympique Chlef	23	11	12	31	37	45	0.822	1595	1576	1.012	
7	Nacéria Club Béjaïa	23	9	14	27	33	51	0.647	1425	1556	0.916	
8	Raed Itihad Jameat El Jazair	23	6	17	18	25	57	0.439	1363	1614	0.844	
9	Association Sportive Ville Blida	23	5	18	18	31	58	0.534	1432	1583	0.905	Relegated to League 2
10	Racine Club Béjaïa	23	5	18	15	25	62	0.403	1326	1556	0.852	Relegated to League 2

=== Round 1 ===
Date	Time		Score		Set 1	Set 2	Set 3	Set 4	Set 5	Total	Report
07 Jun	15:00	Wydad Olympique Chlef	0–3	Racine Club Béjaïa	14–25	17–25	17–25	–	–	48–75	
07 Jun	16:30	Seddouk Béjaïa Volleyball	3–0	Raed Itihad Jameat El Jazair	25–22	25–23	25–22	–	–	75–67	
07 Jun	18:00	Nacéria Club Béjaïa	3–2	Association Sportive Ville Blida	21–25	27–25	25–27	25–23	15–4	113–104	

=== Round 2 ===
Date	Time		Score		Set 1	Set 2	Set 3	Set 4	Set 5	Total	Report
08 Jun	10:00	Wydad Olympique Chlef	0–3	Seddouk Béjaïa Volleyball	18–25	11–25	18–25	–	–	47–75	
08 Jun	11:30	Racine Club Béjaïa	3–2	Association Sportive Ville Blida	25–13	17–25	19–25	25–21	15–6	101–90	
08 Jun	13:00	Raed Itihad Jameat El Jazair	0–3	Nacéria Club Béjaïa	21–25	19–25	11–25	–	–	51–75	

=== Round 3 ===
Date	Time		Score		Set 1	Set 2	Set 3	Set 4	Set 5	Total	Report
13 Jun	15:00	Seddouk Béjaïa Volleyball	3–1	Racine Club Béjaïa	–	–	–	–	–	0–0	
13 Jun	16:30	Nacéria Club Béjaïa	3–0	Wydad Olympique Chlef	–	–	–	–	–	0–0	
13 Jun	18:00	Association Sportive Ville Blida	2–3	Raed Itihad Jameat El Jazair	–	–	–	–	–	0–0	

=== Round 4 ===
Date	Time		Score		Set 1	Set 2	Set 3	Set 4	Set 5	Total	Report
14 Jun	15:00	Seddouk Béjaïa Volleyball	3–0	Nacéria Club Béjaïa	–	–	–	–	–	0–0	
14 Jun	16:30	Racine Club Béjaïa	2–3	Raed Itihad Jameat El Jazair	–	–	–	–	–	0–0	
14 Jun	18:00	Wydad Olympique Chlef	0–3	Association Sportive Ville Blida	–	–	–	–	–	0–0	

=== Round 5 ===
Date	Time		Score		Set 1	Set 2	Set 3	Set 4	Set 5	Total	Report
15 Jun	10:00	Nacéria Club Béjaïa	3–2	Racine Club Béjaïa	–	–	–	–	–	0–0	
15 Jun	11:30	Association Sportive Ville Blida	1–3	Seddouk Béjaïa Volleyball	–	–	–	–	–	0–0	
15 Jun	13:00	Raed Itihad Jameat El Jazair	3–0	Wydad Olympique Chlef	–	–	–	–	–	0–0	
