= 2013–14 Algerian Women's Volleyball League =

2013–14 Algerian League
- League: Algerian League
- Sport: Volleyball
- Duration: October 25, 2013 -June 14, 2014
- Teams: 10
- League champions: GS Pétroliers WVB (25th title)
- Runners-up: Mechâal Baladiat Béjaïa

Algerian League seasons
- 2012–13 2014–15

The 2013–14 season of the Algerian Women's Volleyball League was the 52nd annual season of the country's highest volleyball level.

== Members of the Algerian Women's Volleyball League (2013–14 season) ==
| Team | Location | Hall | Stadium capacity |
|---|---|---|---|
| Mechâal Baladiat Béjaïa | Béjaïa | Salle CSP Amirouche | |
| GS Pétroliers WVB | Algiers | Salle Hacène Harcha | 8.500 |
| Nedjmet Riadhi Chlef | Chlef | Salle OMS Chettia | |
| ASW Béjaïa | Béjaïa | Salle Bleue Béjaïa | |
| NC Béjaïa | Béjaïa | Salle Bleue Béjaïa | |
| Wydad Olympique Chlef | Chlef | Salle OMS Chettia | |
| Raed Itihad Jameat El Jazair | Algiers | Salle OMS Douera | |
| Seddouk Béjaïa Volleyball | El-Kseur | Salle CSP Berchiche El-Kseur | |
| Widad Athlétic Tlemcen | Tlemcen | Salle OPOW Tlemcen | |
| Jeunesse Sportif Azazga | Azazga | Salle OMS Azzefoun | |

== Regular season ==
| Pos | Team | Pld | W | L | Pts | SW | SL | SR | SPW | SPL | SPR | Qualification or relegation |
|---|---|---|---|---|---|---|---|---|---|---|---|---|
| 1 | GS Pétroliers WVB | 18 | 18 | 0 | 53 | 57 | 7 | 8.143 | 1209 | 941 | 1.285 | Champions |
| 2 | Mechâal Baladiat Béjaïa | 18 | 15 | 3 | 45 | 52 | 15 | 3.467 | 1262 | 1049 | 1.203 | |
| 3 | Nedjmet Riadhi Chlef | 18 | 12 | 6 | 38 | 42 | 21 | 2.000 | 1202 | 1079 | 1.114 | |
| 4 | Association Sportive Wilaya Béjaïa | 18 | 11 | 7 | 34 | 38 | 23 | 1.652 | 1113 | 1027 | 1.084 | |
| 5 | Widad Athlétic Tlemcen | 20 | 8 | 12 | 24 | 33 | 35 | 0.943 | 1114 | 1207 | 0.923 | |
| 6 | Seddouk Béjaïa Volleyball | 18 | 8 | 10 | 23 | 29 | 37 | 0.784 | 1185 | 1178 | 1.006 | |
| 7 | Nacéria Club Béjaïa | 18 | 8 | 10 | 22 | 30 | 42 | 0.714 | 1255 | 1283 | 0.978 | |
| 8 | Wydad Olympique Chlef | 18 | 7 | 11 | 19 | 26 | 42 | 0.619 | 1175 | 1163 | 1.010 | |
| 9 | Raed Itihad Jameat El Jazair | 18 | 2 | 16 | 7 | 12 | 50 | 0.240 | 829 | 1141 | 0.727 | Relegated to League 2 |
| 10 | Jeunesse Sportif Azazga | 18 | 1 | 17 | 5 | 13 | 53 | 0.245 | 1028 | 1303 | 0.789 | Relegated to League 2 |

=== Round 1 ===
| Date | Time | | Score | | Set 1 | Set 2 | Set 3 | Set 4 | Set 5 | Total | Report |
|---|---|---|---|---|---|---|---|---|---|---|---|
| 25 Oct | 15:00 | GS Pétroliers WVB | 3–0 | Widad Athlétic Tlemcen | – | – | – | – | – | 0–0 | [ Report] |
| 25 Oct | 15:00 | Mechâal Baladiat Béjaïa | 3–0 | Raed Itihad Jameat El Jazair | – | – | – | – | – | 0–0 | [ Report] |
| 26 Oct | 11:00 | Seddouk Béjaïa Volleyball | 3–0 | Wydad Olympique Chlef | – | – | – | – | – | 0–0 | [ Report] |
| 26 Oct | 10:00 | Nedjmet Riadhi Chlef | 3–0 | Jeunesse Sportif Azazga | – | – | – | – | – | 0–0 | [ Report] |
| 26 Oct | 10:00 | Association Sportive Wilaya Béjaïa | 3–0 | Nacéria Club Béjaïa | – | – | – | – | – | 0–0 | [ Report] |

=== Round 2 ===
| Date | Time | | Score | | Set 1 | Set 2 | Set 3 | Set 4 | Set 5 | Total | Report |
|---|---|---|---|---|---|---|---|---|---|---|---|
| 02 Nov | 17:00 | Widad Athlétic Tlemcen | 3–2 | Wydad Olympique Chlef | 25–23 | 29–31 | 20–25 | 25–19 | 18–16 | 117–114 | Report |
| 01 Nov | 15:00 | GS Pétroliers WVB | 3–0 | Nedjmet Riadhi Chlef | 25–13 | 25–20 | 25–21 | – | – | 75–54 | Report |
| 02 Nov | 10:00 | Nacéria Club Béjaïa | 3–0 | Seddouk Béjaïa Volleyball | 25–21 | 25–18 | 25–23 | – | – | 75–62 | Report |
| 02 Nov | 11:00 | Raed Itihad Jameat El Jazair | 0–3 | Association Sportive Wilaya Béjaïa | 4–25 | 8–25 | 11–25 | – | – | 23–75 | Report |
| 02 Nov | 11:00 | Jeunesse Sportif Azazga | 0–3 | Mechâal Baladiat Béjaïa | 15–25 | 19–25 | 7–25 | – | – | 41–75 | Report |

=== Round 3 ===
| Date | Time | | Score | | Set 1 | Set 2 | Set 3 | Set 4 | Set 5 | Total | Report |
|---|---|---|---|---|---|---|---|---|---|---|---|
| 08 Nov | 15:00 | Mechâal Baladiat Béjaïa | 1–3 | GS Pétroliers WVB | 17–25 | 25–19 | 24–26 | 24–26 | – | 90–96 | Report |
| 09 Nov | 10:00 | Association Sportive Wilaya Béjaïa | 3–0 | Jeunesse Sportif Azazga | 25–19 | 25–21 | 25–13 | – | – | 75–53 | Report |
| 09 Nov | 11:00 | Seddouk Béjaïa Volleyball | 3–0 | Raed Itihad Jameat El Jazair | 25–15 | 25–15 | 25–13 | – | – | 75–43 | Report |
| 09 Nov | 10:00 | Nedjmet Riadhi Chlef | 3–1 | Widad Athlétic Tlemcen | 25–9 | 24–26 | 25–16 | 25–12 | – | 99–63 | Report |
| 09 Nov | 11:30 | Wydad Olympique Chlef | 3–2 | Nacéria Club Béjaïa | 14–25 | 23–25 | 25–16 | 25–18 | 15–7 | 102–91 | Report |

=== Round 4 ===
| Date | Time | | Score | | Set 1 | Set 2 | Set 3 | Set 4 | Set 5 | Total | Report |
|---|---|---|---|---|---|---|---|---|---|---|---|
| 15 Nov | 15:00 | GS Pétroliers WVB | 3–1 | Association Sportive Wilaya Béjaïa | 25–21 | 19–25 | 25–12 | 25–17 | – | 94–75 | Report |
| 16 Nov | 11:00 | Widad Athlétic Tlemcen | 3–1 | Nacéria Club Béjaïa | 19–25 | 25–20 | 25–19 | 25–23 | – | 94–87 | Report |
| 16 Nov | 11:00 | Jeunesse Sportif Azazga | 1–3 | Seddouk Béjaïa Volleyball | 25–20 | 19–25 | 23–25 | 16–25 | – | 83–95 | Report |
| 16 Nov | 10:00 | Nedjmet Riadhi Chlef | 2–3 | Mechâal Baladiat Béjaïa | 25–22 | 13–25 | 22–25 | 25–20 | 10–15 | 95–107 | Report |
| 16 Nov | 10:00 | Raed Itihad Jameat El Jazair | 0–3 | Wydad Olympique Chlef | 19–25 | 15–25 | 22–25 | – | – | 56–75 | Report |

=== Round 5 ===
| Date | Time | | Score | | Set 1 | Set 2 | Set 3 | Set 4 | Set 5 | Total | Report |
|---|---|---|---|---|---|---|---|---|---|---|---|
| 23 Nov | 10:00 | Wydad Olympique Chlef | – | Jeunesse Sportif Azazga | – | – | – | – | – | 0–0 | [ Report] |
| 23 Nov | 11:00 | Seddouk Béjaïa Volleyball | – | GS Pétroliers WVB | – | – | – | – | – | 0–0 | [ Report] |
| 23 Nov | 10:00 | Nacéria Club Béjaïa | – | Raed Itihad Jameat El Jazair | – | – | – | – | – | 0–0 | [ Report] |
| 23 Nov | 11:30 | Association Sportive Wilaya Béjaïa | – | Nedjmet Riadhi Chlef | – | – | – | – | – | 0–0 | [ Report] |
| 22 Nov | 10:30 | Mechâal Baladiat Béjaïa | – | Widad Athlétic Tlemcen | – | – | – | – | – | 0–0 | [ Report] |

=== Round 6 ===
| Date | Time | | Score | | Set 1 | Set 2 | Set 3 | Set 4 | Set 5 | Total | Report |
|---|---|---|---|---|---|---|---|---|---|---|---|
| 29 Nov | 15:00 | Mechâal Baladiat Béjaïa | 3–1 | Association Sportive Wilaya Béjaïa | 25–17 | 25–11 | 18–25 | 25–20 | – | 93–73 | Report |
| 29 Nov | 15:00 | GS Pétroliers WVB | 3–0 | Wydad Olympique Chlef | 25–19 | 25–19 | 25–21 | – | – | 75–59 | Report |
| 30 Nov | 11:00 | Jeunesse Sportif Azazga | 2–3 | Nacéria Club Béjaïa | 25–21 | 23–25 | 25–23 | 26–28 | 8–15 | 107–112 | Report |
| 30 Nov | 10:00 | Widad Athlétic Tlemcen | 3–2 | Raed Itihad Jameat El Jazair | – | – | – | – | – | 0–0 | Report |
| 30 Nov | 10:00 | Nedjmet Riadhi Chlef | 3–0 | Seddouk Béjaïa Volleyball | 25–14 | 25–21 | 25–21 | – | – | 75–56 | Report |

=== Round 7 ===
| Date | Time | | Score | | Set 1 | Set 2 | Set 3 | Set 4 | Set 5 | Total | Report |
|---|---|---|---|---|---|---|---|---|---|---|---|
| 07 Dec | 11:00 | Seddouk Béjaïa Volleyball | 1–3 | Mechâal Baladiat Béjaïa | 25–21 | 17–25 | 11–25 | 22–25 | – | 75–96 | Report |
| 07 Dec | 10:00 | Nacéria Club Béjaïa | 1–3 | GS Pétroliers WVB | 25–27 | 25–15 | 20–25 | 16–25 | – | 86–92 | Report |
| 07 Dec | 11:30 | Association Sportive Wilaya Béjaïa | 3–1 | Widad Athlétic Tlemcen | 25–18 | 23–25 | 25–22 | 25–22 | – | 98–87 | Report |
| 07 Dec | 10:00 | Wydad Olympique Chlef | 0–3 | Nedjmet Riadhi Chlef | 9–25 | 10–25 | 22–25 | – | – | 41–75 | Report |
| 07 Dec | 10:00 | Raed Itihad Jameat El Jazair | 3–1 | Jeunesse Sportif Azazga | 25–20 | 11–25 | 25–19 | 25–21 | – | 86–85 | Report |

=== Round 8 ===
| Date | Time | | Score | | Set 1 | Set 2 | Set 3 | Set 4 | Set 5 | Total | Report |
|---|---|---|---|---|---|---|---|---|---|---|---|
| 13 Dec | 18:00 | GS Pétroliers WVB | 3–0 | Raed Itihad Jameat El Jazair | 25–11 | 25–11 | 25–17 | – | – | 75–39 | Report |
| 13 Dec | 10:30 | Mechâal Baladiat Béjaïa | 3–1 | Wydad Olympique Chlef | 25–21 | 25–22 | 23–25 | 25–7 | – | 98–75 | Report |
| 14 Dec | 11:00 | Widad Athlétic Tlemcen | 3–0 | Jeunesse Sportif Azazga | 26–24 | 25–12 | 25–21 | – | – | 76–57 | Report |
| 14 Dec | 10:00 | Nedjmet Riadhi Chlef | 3–0 | Nacéria Club Béjaïa | 25–20 | 25–15 | 25–9 | – | – | 75–44 | Report |
| 14 Dec | 10:00 | Association Sportive Wilaya Béjaïa | 2–3 | Seddouk Béjaïa Volleyball | 17–25 | 25–14 | 21–25 | 25–13 | 6–15 | 94–92 | Report |

=== Round 9 ===
| Date | Time | | Score | | Set 1 | Set 2 | Set 3 | Set 4 | Set 5 | Total | Report |
|---|---|---|---|---|---|---|---|---|---|---|---|
| 27 Dec | 15:00 | Nacéria Club Béjaïa | 3–2 | Mechâal Baladiat Béjaïa | 25–19 | 15–25 | 25–16 | 11–25 | 15–10 | 91–95 | Report |
| 28 Dec | 10:00 | Raed Itihad Jameat El Jazair | 0–3 | Nedjmet Riadhi Chlef | 22–25 | 12–25 | 21–25 | – | – | 55–75 | Report |
| 28 Dec | 11:00 | Jeunesse Sportif Azazga | 0–3 | GS Pétroliers WVB | 17–25 | 12–25 | 19–25 | – | – | 48–75 | Report |
| 28 Dec | 10:00 | Wydad Olympique Chlef | 0–3 | Association Sportive Wilaya Béjaïa | 10–25 | 17–25 | 12–25 | – | – | 39–75 | Report |
| 28 Dec | 11:00 | Seddouk Béjaïa Volleyball | 3–0 | Widad Athlétic Tlemcen | 25–23 | 25–13 | 27–25 | – | – | 77–61 | Report |

=== Round 10 ===
| Date | Time | | Score | | Set 1 | Set 2 | Set 3 | Set 4 | Set 5 | Total | Report |
|---|---|---|---|---|---|---|---|---|---|---|---|
| 04 Jan | 11:00 | Widad Athlétic Tlemcen | 2–3 | GS Pétroliers WVB | 25–18 | 25–19 | 17–25 | 12–25 | 9–15 | 88–102 | Report |
| 04 Jan | 10:00 | Raed Itihad Jameat El Jazair | 0–3 | Mechâal Baladiat Béjaïa | 13–25 | 22–25 | 18–25 | – | – | 53–75 | Report |
| 04 Jan | 10:00 | Wydad Olympique Chlef | 2–3 | Seddouk Béjaïa Volleyball | 20–25 | 19–25 | 25–21 | 25–23 | 14–16 | 103–110 | Report |
| 04 Jan | 11:00 | Jeunesse Sportif Azazga | 0–3 | Nedjmet Riadhi Chlef | 14–25 | 16–25 | 10–25 | – | – | 40–75 | Report |
| 04 Jan | 10:00 | Nacéria Club Béjaïa | 0–3 | Association Sportive Wilaya Béjaïa | 26–24 | 25–14 | 25–21 | – | – | 76–59 | Report |

=== Round 11 ===
| Date | Time | | Score | | Set 1 | Set 2 | Set 3 | Set 4 | Set 5 | Total | Report |
|---|---|---|---|---|---|---|---|---|---|---|---|
| 17 Jan | 15:00 | Mechâal Baladiat Béjaïa | 3–0 | Jeunesse Sportif Azazga | 25–17 | 25–19 | 25–23 | – | – | 75–59 | Report |
| 18 Jan | 11:00 | Seddouk Béjaïa Volleyball | 0–3 | Nacéria Club Béjaïa | 13–25 | 22–25 | 25–27 | – | – | 60–77 | Report |
| 18 Jan | 10:00 | Association Sportive Wilaya Béjaïa | 3–0 | Raed Itihad Jameat El Jazair | 25–16 | 25–18 | 25–20 | – | – | 75–54 | Report |
| 18 Jan | 10:00 | Nedjmet Riadhi Chlef | 1–3 | GS Pétroliers WVB | 13–25 | 32–30 | 16–25 | 15–25 | – | 76–105 | Report |
| 18 Jan | 11:30 | Wydad Olympique Chlef | 3–2 | Widad Athlétic Tlemcen | 25–22 | 25–21 | 21–25 | 19–25 | 15–12 | 105–105 | Report |

=== Round 12 ===
| Date | Time | | Score | | Set 1 | Set 2 | Set 3 | Set 4 | Set 5 | Total | Report |
|---|---|---|---|---|---|---|---|---|---|---|---|
| 07 Mar | 15:00 | GS Pétroliers WVB | 3–1 | Mechâal Baladiat Béjaïa | 25–18 | 25–14 | 24–26 | 25–21 | – | 99–79 | Report |
| 08 Mar | 11:00 | Jeunesse Sportif Azazga | 0–3 | Association Sportive Wilaya Béjaïa | 12–25 | 19–25 | 20–25 | – | – | 51–75 | Report |
| 07 Mar | 09:30 | Raed Itihad Jameat El Jazair | 1–3 | Seddouk Béjaïa Volleyball | 25–21 | 17–25 | 16–25 | 18–25 | – | 76–96 | Report |
| 08 Mar | 11:00 | Widad Athlétic Tlemcen | 3–2 | Nedjmet Riadhi Chlef | 25–22 | 28–26 | 20–25 | 22–25 | 15–13 | 110–111 | Report |
| 08 Mar | 10:00 | Nacéria Club Béjaïa | 1–3 | Wydad Olympique Chlef | 23–25 | 25–17 | 21–25 | 20–25 | – | 89–92 | Report |

=== Round 13 ===
| Date | Time | | Score | | Set 1 | Set 2 | Set 3 | Set 4 | Set 5 | Total | Report |
|---|---|---|---|---|---|---|---|---|---|---|---|
| 21 Mar | 15:00 | Mechâal Baladiat Béjaïa | 3–1 | Nedjmet Riadhi Chlef | 25–22 | 25–23 | 25–27 | 25–15 | – | 100–87 | Report |
| 22 Mar | 10:00 | Nacéria Club Béjaïa | 3–2 | Widad Athlétic Tlemcen | 25–13 | 30–28 | 20–25 | 23–25 | 18–16 | 116–107 | Report |
| 22 Mar | 11:30 | Association Sportive Wilaya Béjaïa | 1–3 | GS Pétroliers WVB | 25–20 | 21–25 | 24–26 | 18–25 | – | 88–96 | Report |
| 22 Mar | 11:00 | Seddouk Béjaïa Volleyball | 2–3 | Jeunesse Sportif Azazga | 25–17 | 25–18 | 20–25 | 23–25 | 11–15 | 104–100 | Report |
| 22 Mar | 10:00 | Wydad Olympique Chlef | 3–0 | Raed Itihad Jameat El Jazair | 25–14 | 25–8 | 25–12 | – | – | 75–34 | Report |

=== Round 14 ===
| Date | Time | | Score | | Set 1 | Set 2 | Set 3 | Set 4 | Set 5 | Total | Report |
|---|---|---|---|---|---|---|---|---|---|---|---|
| 02 May | 15:00 | GS Pétroliers WVB | 3–0 | Seddouk Béjaïa Volleyball | 25–16 | 25–18 | 25–17 | – | – | 75–51 | Report |
| 03 May | 11:00 | Jeunesse Sportif Azazga | 2–3 | Wydad Olympique Chlef | 18–25 | 25–23 | 21–25 | 25–23 | 25–27 | 114–123 | Report |
| 03 May | 10:00 | Raed Itihad Jameat El Jazair | 0–3 | Nacéria Club Béjaïa | 14–25 | 19–25 | 18–25 | – | – | 51–75 | Report |
| 03 May | 10:00 | Nedjmet Riadhi Chlef | 1–3 | Association Sportive Wilaya Béjaïa | 21–25 | 25–16 | 17–25 | 25–27 | – | 88–93 | Report |
| 03 May | 11:00 | Widad Athlétic Tlemcen | 1–3 | Mechâal Baladiat Béjaïa | 15–25 | 16–25 | 18–25 | – | – | 49–75 | Report |

=== Round 15 ===
| Date | Time | | Score | | Set 1 | Set 2 | Set 3 | Set 4 | Set 5 | Total | Report |
|---|---|---|---|---|---|---|---|---|---|---|---|
| 10 May | 10:00 | Association Sportive Wilaya Béjaïa | 0–3 | Mechâal Baladiat Béjaïa | 14–25 | 22–25 | 22–25 | – | – | 58–75 | Report |
| 07 Jun | 11:00 | Wydad Olympique Chlef | – | GS Pétroliers WVB | – | – | – | – | – | 0–0 | [ Report] |
| 10 May | 10:00 | Nacéria Club Béjaïa | 3–1 | Jeunesse Sportif Azazga | 25–13 | 14–25 | 25–14 | 25–17 | – | 89–69 | Report |
| 10 May | 10:00 | Raed Itihad Jameat El Jazair | 1–3 | Widad Athlétic Tlemcen | 23–25 | 25–22 | 18–25 | 23–25 | – | 89–97 | Report |
| 10 May | 11:00 | Seddouk Béjaïa Volleyball | 1–3 | Nedjmet Riadhi Chlef | 26–24 | 20–25 | 22–25 | 30–32 | – | 98–106 | Report |

=== Round 16 ===
| Date | Time | | Score | | Set 1 | Set 2 | Set 3 | Set 4 | Set 5 | Total | Report |
|---|---|---|---|---|---|---|---|---|---|---|---|
| 16 May | 15:00 | GS Pétroliers WVB | 3–0 | Nacéria Club Béjaïa | – | – | – | – | – | 0–0 | Report |
| 17 May | 15:00 | Mechâal Baladiat Béjaïa | 3–0 | Seddouk Béjaïa Volleyball | – | – | – | – | – | 0–0 | Report |
| 17 May | 11:00 | Widad Athlétic Tlemcen | 3–0 | Association Sportive Wilaya Béjaïa | – | – | – | – | – | 0–0 | Report |
| 17 May | 10:00 | Nedjmet Riadhi Chlef | 3–0 | Wydad Olympique Chlef | – | – | – | – | – | 0–0 | Report |
| 17 May | 11:00 | Jeunesse Sportif Azazga | 1–3 | Raed Itihad Jameat El Jazair | – | – | – | – | – | 0–0 | Report |

=== Round 17 ===
| Date | Time | | Score | | Set 1 | Set 2 | Set 3 | Set 4 | Set 5 | Total | Report |
|---|---|---|---|---|---|---|---|---|---|---|---|
| 30 May | 10:00 | Raed Itihad Jameat El Jazair | 0–3 | GS Pétroliers WVB | 16–25 | 15–25 | 23–25 | – | – | 54–75 | Report |
| 30 May | 11:00 | Jeunesse Sportif Azazga | 0–3 | Widad Athlétic Tlemcen | 12–25 | 15–25 | 23–25 | – | – | 50–75 | Report |
| 30 May | 10:00 | Nacéria Club Béjaïa | 1–3 | Nedjmet Riadhi Chlef | 16–25 | 25–23 | 15–25 | 18–25 | – | 74–98 | Report |
| 30 May | 10:00 | Wydad Olympique Chlef | 0–3 | Mechâal Baladiat Béjaïa | 20–25 | 23–25 | 23–25 | – | – | 66–75 | Report |
| 30 May | 11:00 | Seddouk Béjaïa Volleyball | 1–3 | Association Sportive Wilaya Béjaïa | 24–26 | 19–25 | 25–23 | 18–25 | – | 86–99 | Report |

=== Round 18 ===
| Date | Time | | Score | | Set 1 | Set 2 | Set 3 | Set 4 | Set 5 | Total | Report |
|---|---|---|---|---|---|---|---|---|---|---|---|
| 07 Jun | 10:30 | Mechâal Baladiat Béjaïa | – | Nacéria Club Béjaïa | – | – | – | – | – | 0–0 | Report |
| 13 Jun | 11:30 | GS Pétroliers WVB | 3–0 | Jeunesse Sportif Azazga | – | – | – | – | – | 0–0 | Report |
| 14 Jun | 10:00 | Widad Athlétic Tlemcen | 1–3 | Seddouk Béjaïa Volleyball | – | – | – | – | – | 0–0 | Report |
| 14 Jun | 10:00 | Association Sportive Wilaya Béjaïa | 3–0 | Wydad Olympique Chlef | – | – | – | – | – | 0–0 | Report |
| 14 Jun | 10:00 | Nedjmet Riadhi Chlef | 3–0 | Raed Itihad Jameat El Jazair | – | – | – | – | – | 0–0 | Report |

== Awards ==
The champions of the league was the GS Pétroliers WVB.
