= GS Pétroliers =

GS Pétroliers may refer to:

- GS Pétroliers (basketball), basketball section of the multi-sports club
- GS Pétroliers (handball), handball section of the multi-sports club
- GS Pétroliers (volleyball), men's volleyball section of the multi-sports club
- GS Pétroliers (women's volleyball), women's volleyball section of the multi-sports club
