= MC Alger (disambiguation) =

MC Alger is an Algerian football club.

MC Alger may also refer to:

- MC Alger (handball)
- MC Alger (basketball)
- MC Alger (men's volleyball)
- MC Alger (women's volleyball)
- MC Alger (cycling)
