= Algerian Men's Volleyball League =

Pre-eminent men's volleyball league in Algeria

- Current season, competition or edition: 2024–25 Algerian Men's Volleyball League
- Sport: Volleyball
- Founded: 1962
- No. of teams: 10
- Country: Algeria
- Continent: Africa (CAVB)
- Most recent champion: WA Tlemcen (2025)
- Most titles: NA Hussein Dey (14)
- Website: Algerian Volleyball Federation

The Algerian Volleyball Championship, now called the ABC National 1, formally known as the ABC Super Division, is the pre-eminent men's volleyball league in Algeria, National 1 is contested by 16 teams, with the two lowest-placed teams relegated to the Second Division and replaced by the two winner of the playoffs. From the 1963 onwards, GS Pétroliers (19 titles) and WA Boufarik (9 titles) both dominated Also there is Darak El-Watani won 11 titles but it no longer exists, though National 1 also saw other champions, including OC Alger, ASM Oran, USM Alger, RAM Alger, MC Oran, NB Staouéli, AS PTT Alger and CSM Constantine.

== List of Men's champions ==
Year	Gold	Silver	Bronze
1962–63	GS Hydra		
1963–64	GS Hydra		
1964–65	OM Saint Eugène		
1965–66	GCS Alger		
1966–67	Hydra AC		
1967–68	OM Saint Eugène		
1968–69	OM Saint Eugène		
1969–70	ASPTT Tlemcen		
1970–71	NA Hussein Dey		
1971–72	NA Hussein Dey		
1972–73	NA Hussein Dey		
1973–74	NA Hussein Dey		
1974–75	NA Hussein Dey		
1975–76	NA Hussein Dey		
1976–77	NA Hussein Dey		
1977–78	NA Hussein Dey		
1978–79	CS DNC Alger		
1979–80	CS DNC Alger		
1980–81	CS DNC Alger		
1981–82	ES Sétif		
1982–83	NA Hussein Dey		
1983–84	NA Hussein Dey		
1984–85	PO Chlef		
1985–86	PO Chlef		
1986–87	ES Sétif		
1987–88	NA Hussein Dey		
1988–89	MC Alger		
1989–90	EC Sidi Moussa		
1990–91	MC Alger		
1991–92	NA Hussein Dey		
1992–93	NA Hussein Dey		
1993–94	USM Blida		
1994–95	MC Alger		
1995–96	NA Hussein Dey		
1996–97	USM Blida		
1997–98	USM Blida		
1998–99	SR Annaba		
1999–00	OC Alger		
2000–01	USM Blida		
2001–02	USM Blida		
2002–03	MC Alger		
2003–04	MC Alger		
2004–05	MC Alger	PO Chlef	USM Blida
2005–06	MC Alger	MB Bejaia	
2006–07	MC Alger	MB Bejaia	
2007–08	GS Pétroliers	PO Chlef	MB Bejaia
2008–09	PO Chlef	MB Bejaia	ES Sétif
2009–10	ES Sétif	GS Pétroliers	USM Blida
2010–11	NR Bordj Bou Arreridj	GS Pétroliers	MB Bejaia
2011–12	MB Bejaia	NR Bordj Bou Arreridj	ES Béthioua
2012–13	GS Pétroliers	ES Sétif	MB Bejaia
2013–14	NR Bordj Bou Arreridj	ES Sétif	MB Bejaia
2014–15	NR Bordj Bou Arreridj		
2015–16	NR Bordj Bou Arreridj	GS Pétroliers	MB Bejaia
2016–17	NR Bordj Bou Arreridj	GS Pétroliers	ES Sétif
2017–18	NR Bordj Bou Arreridj	OMK El Milia	GS Pétroliers
2018–19	NR Bordj Bou Arreridj	GS Pétroliers	
2019–20	NR Bordj Bou Arreridj		
2020–21	Cancelled due to the COVID-19 pandemic in Algeria		
2021–22	NR Bordj Bou Arreridj	ASC Ouled Adouane	
2022–23	NR Bordj Bou Arreridj		
2023–24	WA Tlemcen	ASV Blida	
2024–25	WA Tlemcen	MC Alger	
2025–26			

== Titles by team ==
Club	Winners	Runners-up
NA Hussein Dey	14 (1971, 1972, 1973, 1974, 1975, 1976, 1977, 1978, 1983, 1984, 1988, 1992, 1993, 1996)	
MC Alger	10 (1989, 1991, 1995, 2003, 2004, 2005, 2006, 2007, 2008, 2013)	
NR Bordj Bou Arreridj	10 (2011, 2014, 2015, 2016, 2017, 2018, 2019, 2020, 2022, 2023)	
USM Blida	5 (1994, 1997, 1998, 2001, 2002)	
OM Saint Eugène	3 (1965, 1968, 1969)	
CS DNC Alger	3 (1979, 1980, 1981)	
PO Chlef	3 (1985, 1986, 2009)	
GS Hydra	3 (1963, 1964, 1967)	
ES Sétif	2 (1982, 1987)	
WA Tlemcen	2 (2024, 2025)	
GCS Alger	1 (1966)	
ASPTT Tlemcen	1 (1970)	
SR Annaba	1 (1999)	
OC Alger	1 (2000)	
ES Sétif	1 (2010)	
MB Bejaia	1 (2012)	

== Members of the Algerian Men's Volleyball League (2021–22 season) ==
These are the teams that participate in the 2021–22 Algerian Volleyball League season:

=== Group Center-West ===
Team	Location	Hall	Stadium capacity
MC Alger	Algiers	Salle Hacène Harcha	8.500
RM Arzew	Arzew	Salle Omnipsorts d'Arzew	2.500
ASV Blida	Blida	Salle OMS Hocine Chalane	3.000
PO Chlef	Chlef	Salle Omnisport Mohamed Nasri	2.500
Olympique El Kseur	El Kseur	Salle CSP Berchiche El Kseur	
MR Hassi Bounif	Hassi Bounif, Oran	Salle de Proximité de Hassi Bounif	
NA Hussein Dey	Hussein Dey, Algiers	Salle Omnisports de Oued Smar	
JSB Ighram	Ighram	Salle Communale de Ighram	
RC M'Sila	M'Sila	Salle OMS Salem Mayouf	
WA Tlemcen	Tlemcen	Salle OPOW Birouana de Tlemcen	

=== Group Center-East ===
Team	Location	Hall	Stadium capacity
El Fanar Aïn Azel	Aïn Azel	Salle OMS de Aïn Azel	
JM Batna	Batna	Salle du 1er Novembre	
MB Béjaïa	Béjaïa	Salle CSP Amirouche	
NC Béjaïa	Béjaïa	Salle CSP Amirouche	
NR Bordj Bou Arreridj	Bordj Bou Arreridj	Salle OMS Saad Boubiaa	
OMK El Milia	El Milia	Salle OMS El Meridja	
JSC Ouled Adouane	Ouled Addouane	Salle OMS Aïn El Kbira	
CS Sétif	Sétif	Salle du 8 Mai 1945	
ES Sétif	Sétif	Salle du 8 Mai 1945	
ES Tadjenanet	Tadjenanet	Salle OMS Rachid Meghari	

== See also ==
- Algerian Women's Volleyball League
