= NA Hussein Dey (volleyball) =

NA Hussein Dey Volleyball
- Full name: El Nasria
- Founded: 1947
- Chairman: Kadri Boubekeur
- Manager: (Algeria)
- League: Algerian Men's Volleyball League

Uniforms
Home	Away

NA Hussein Dey Volleyball (Arabic: نصر أتلتيك حسين داي لكرة الطائرة) is a professional Volleyball team based in Hussein Dey, Algeria. It plays in Algerian Men's Volleyball League. The team won the 1990 African Clubs Championship title. The club was founded in 1947.

== Honors ==
=== National Men's Achievements ===
- Algerian Championship :

Winners (14 titles) : (1971, 1972, 1973, 1974, 1975, 1976, 1977, 1978, 1983, 1984, 1988, 1992, 1993, 1996)

- Algerian Cup :

Winners (11 titles) : (1970, 1971, 1972, 1974, 1975, 1976, 1977, 1980, 1986, 1987, 1993)

International Men's competitions

- African Clubs Championship :

Winners (1 title) : (1990)

=== National Women's Achievements ===
- Algerian Championship :

Winners (10 titles) : (1963, 1964, 1965, 1966, 1967, 1968, 1969, 1970, 1971, 1977)

- Algerian Cup :

Winners (7 titles) : (1967, 1968, 1969, 1970, 1971, 1972, 1989)
