= 2011–12 Algerian Women's Volleyball League =

2011–12 Algerian League
- League: Algerian League
- Sport: Volleyball
- Duration: February 17, 2012 -June 09, 2012
- Teams: 10
- League champions: Mechâal Baladiat Béjaïa (First title)
- Runners-up: GS Pétroliers WVB

Algerian League seasons
- 2010–11 2012–13

The 2011–12 season of the Algerian Women's Volleyball League was the 50th annual season of the country's highest volleyball level.

== Members of the Algerian Women's Volleyball League (2011–12 season) ==
Team	Location	Hall	Stadium capacity
Mechâal Baladiat Béjaïa	Béjaïa	Salle CSP Amirouche	
GS Pétroliers WVB	Algiers	Salle Hacène Harcha	8.500
Nedjmet Riadhi Chlef	Chlef	Salle OMS Chettia	
ASW Béjaïa	Béjaïa	Salle Bleue Béjaïa	
NC Béjaïa	Béjaïa	Salle Bleue Béjaïa	
Ghalia Sportif Chlef	Chlef	Salle OMS Chettia	
Raed Itihad Jameat El Jazair	Algiers	Salle OMS Douera	
Seddouk Béjaïa Volleyball	El-Kseur	Salle CSP Berchiche El-Kseur	
Jeunesse Sportif Azazga	Azazga	Salle OMS Azzefoun	
Association Sportive de la Ville Blida	Blida	Salle OM Hocine Chalane	3.000

== Regular season ==
=== Groupe Centre Est ===
Pos	Team	Pld	W	L	Pts	SW	SL	SR	SPW	SPL	SPR	Qualification
1	Nacéria Club Béjaïa	8	7	1	20	22	6	3.667	659	549	1.200	Semi-final
2	Mechâal Baladiat Béjaïa	8	6	2	20	22	8	2.750	627	663	0.946	Semi-final
3	Association Sportive Wilaya Béjaïa	8	5	3	14	16	11	1.455	626	563	1.112	Play Down
4	Seddouk Béjaïa Volleyball	8	1	7	4	6	21	0.286	515	623	0.827	Play Down
5	Jeunesse Sportif Azazga	8	1	7	2	3	23	0.130	436	627	0.695	Play Down

==== Round 1 ====
Date	Time		Score		Set 1	Set 2	Set 3	Set 4	Set 5	Total	Report
17 Feb	09:30	Nacéria Club Béjaïa	3–0	Seddouk Béjaïa Volleyball	25–18	25–21	25–22	–	–	75–61	
17 Feb	11:00	Association Sportive Wilaya Béjaïa	3–0	Jeunesse Sportif Azazga	25–17	25–20	25–11	–	–	75–48	

==== Round 2 ====
Date	Time		Score		Set 1	Set 2	Set 3	Set 4	Set 5	Total	Report
18 Feb	10:00	Mechâal Baladiat Béjaïa	3–1	Nacéria Club Béjaïa	25–21	25–18	18–25	25–23	–	93–87	
18 Feb	11:30	Seddouk Béjaïa Volleyball	0–3	Association Sportive Wilaya Béjaïa	20–25	14–25	13–25	–	–	47–75	

==== Round 3 ====
Date	Time		Score		Set 1	Set 2	Set 3	Set 4	Set 5	Total	Report
24 Feb	15:30	Jeunesse Sportif Azazga	3–2	Seddouk Béjaïa Volleyball	25–20	13–25	25–15	14–25	13–15	90–100	
24 Feb	17:00	Association Sportive Wilaya Béjaïa	3–1	Mechâal Baladiat Béjaïa	25–22	17–25	18–25	15–25	–	75–97	

==== Round 4 ====
Date	Time		Score		Set 1	Set 2	Set 3	Set 4	Set 5	Total	Report
25 Feb	10:00	Mechâal Baladiat Béjaïa	3–0	Jeunesse Sportif Azazga	25–13	25–16	25–13	–	–	75–42	
25 Feb	11:30	Nacéria Club Béjaïa	3–1	Association Sportive Wilaya Béjaïa	25–22	18–25	25–19	25–17	–	93–83	

==== Round 5 ====
Date	Time		Score		Set 1	Set 2	Set 3	Set 4	Set 5	Total	Report
09 Mar	15:00	Jeunesse Sportif Azazga	0–3	Nacéria Club Béjaïa	10–25	20–25	14–25	–	–	44–75	
09 Mar	16:30	Seddouk Béjaïa Volleyball	1–3	Mechâal Baladiat Béjaïa	15–25	25–16	16–25	16–25	–	72–91	

==== Round 6 ====
Date	Time		Score		Set 1	Set 2	Set 3	Set 4	Set 5	Total	Report
10 Mar	14:00	Jeunesse Sportif Azazga	0–3	Association Sportive Wilaya Béjaïa	21–25	19–25	15–25	–	–	55–75	
10 Mar	15:30	Seddouk Béjaïa Volleyball	0–3	Nacéria Club Béjaïa	23–25	10–25	21–25	–	–	54–75	

==== Round 7 ====
Date	Time		Score		Set 1	Set 2	Set 3	Set 4	Set 5	Total	Report
16 Mar	15:00	Association Sportive Wilaya Béjaïa	3–0	Seddouk Béjaïa Volleyball	25–9	25–22	25–20	–	–	75–51	
16 Mar	16:30	Nacéria Club Béjaïa	3–2	Mechâal Baladiat Béjaïa	25–22	26–24	18–25	19–25	16–14	104–110	

==== Round 8 ====
Date	Time		Score		Set 1	Set 2	Set 3	Set 4	Set 5	Total	Report
17 Mar	14:00	Seddouk Béjaïa Volleyball	0–3	Jeunesse Sportif Azazga	27–25	25–19	25–23	–	–	77–67	
17 Mar	15:30	Mechâal Baladiat Béjaïa	2–3	Association Sportive Wilaya Béjaïa	16–25	25–21	21–25	25–21	10–15	97–107	

==== Round 9 ====
Date	Time		Score		Set 1	Set 2	Set 3	Set 4	Set 5	Total	Report
23 Mar	15:00	Jeunesse Sportif Azazga	0–3	Mechâal Baladiat Béjaïa	21–25	10–25	12–25	–	–	43–75	
23 Mar	16:30	Association Sportive Wilaya Béjaïa	0–3	Nacéria Club Béjaïa	16–25	23–25	22–25	–	–	61–75	

==== Round 10 ====
Date	Time		Score		Set 1	Set 2	Set 3	Set 4	Set 5	Total	Report
24 Mar	14:00	Mechâal Baladiat Béjaïa	3–0	Seddouk Béjaïa Volleyball	25–19	25–17	25–17	–	–	75–53	
24 Mar	15:30	Nacéria Club Béjaïa	3–0	Jeunesse Sportif Azazga	25–13	25–14	25–20	–	–	75–47	

=== Groupe Centre Ouest ===
==== Round 1 ====
Date	Time	Score	Set 1	Set 2	Set 3	Set 4	Set 5	Total	Report
	..:..	–	–	–	–	–	–	0–0	[]
	..:..	–	–	–	–	–	–	0–0	[]

==== Round 2 ====
Date	Time	Score	Set 1	Set 2	Set 3	Set 4	Set 5	Total	Report
	..:..	–	–	–	–	–	–	0–0	[]
	..:..	–	–	–	–	–	–	0–0	[]

==== Round 3 ====
Date	Time	Score	Set 1	Set 2	Set 3	Set 4	Set 5	Total	Report
	..:..	–	–	–	–	–	–	0–0	[]
	..:..	–	–	–	–	–	–	0–0	[]

==== Round 4 ====
Date	Time	Score	Set 1	Set 2	Set 3	Set 4	Set 5	Total	Report
	..:..	–	–	–	–	–	–	0–0	[]
	..:..	–	–	–	–	–	–	0–0	[]

==== Round 5 ====
Date	Time	Score	Set 1	Set 2	Set 3	Set 4	Set 5	Total	Report
	..:..	–	–	–	–	–	–	0–0	[]
	..:..	–	–	–	–	–	–	0–0	[]

==== Round 6 ====
Date	Time	Score	Set 1	Set 2	Set 3	Set 4	Set 5	Total	Report
	..:..	–	–	–	–	–	–	0–0	[]
	..:..	–	–	–	–	–	–	0–0	[]

==== Round 7 ====
Date	Time	Score	Set 1	Set 2	Set 3	Set 4	Set 5	Total	Report
	..:..	–	–	–	–	–	–	0–0	[]
	..:..	–	–	–	–	–	–	0–0	[]

==== Round 8 ====
Date	Time	Score	Set 1	Set 2	Set 3	Set 4	Set 5	Total	Report
	..:..	–	–	–	–	–	–	0–0	[]
	..:..	–	–	–	–	–	–	0–0	[]

==== Round 9 ====
Date	Time	Score	Set 1	Set 2	Set 3	Set 4	Set 5	Total	Report
	..:..	–	–	–	–	–	–	0–0	[]
	..:..	–	–	–	–	–	–	0–0	[]

==== Round 10 ====
Date	Time	Score	Set 1	Set 2	Set 3	Set 4	Set 5	Total	Report
	..:..	–	–	–	–	–	–	0–0	[]
	..:..	–	–	–	–	–	–	0–0	[]

== Final ==
=== Round 1 ===
Date	Time		Score		Set 1	Set 2	Set 3	Set 4	Set 5	Total	Report
07 Jun	16:30	Mechâal Baladiat Béjaïa	3–0	Nacéria Club Béjaïa	25–23	25–17	25–13	–	–	75–53	
07 Jun	15:00	GS Pétroliers WVB	3–0	Nedjmet Riadhi Chlef	25–14	25–18	28–26	–	–	78–58	

=== Round 2 ===
Date	Time		Score		Set 1	Set 2	Set 3	Set 4	Set 5	Total	Report
08 Jun	15:00	Nedjmet Riadhi Chlef	0–3	Mechâal Baladiat Béjaïa	15–25	20–25	20–25	–	–	55–75	
08 Jun	16:30	GS Pétroliers WVB	3–1	Nacéria Club Béjaïa	25–14	21–25	25–15	25–15	–	96–69	

=== Round 3 ===
Date	Time		Score		Set 1	Set 2	Set 3	Set 4	Set 5	Total	Report
09 Jun	15:00	Mechâal Baladiat Béjaïa	3–2	GS Pétroliers WVB	10–25	25–19	24–26	29–27	15–12	103–109	
09 Jun	13:00	Nacéria Club Béjaïa	3–1	Nedjmet Riadhi Chlef	16–25	25–23	25–20	25–19	–	91–87	

== Play Down ==
=== Round 1 ===
Date	Time		Score		Set 1	Set 2	Set 3	Set 4	Set 5	Total	Report
04 May	17:00	Association Sportive Wilaya Béjaïa	3–0	Jeunesse Sportif Azazga	25–14	25–19	25–15	–	–	75–48	
04 May	15:00	Association Sportive Ville Blida	2–3	Ghalia Sportif Chlef	25–17	17–25	25–22	19–25	10–15	96–104	
04 May	16:30	Raed Itihad Jameat El Jazair	3–1	Seddouk Béjaïa Volleyball	23–25	25–19	25–21	25–22	–	98–87	

=== Round 2 ===
Date	Time		Score		Set 1	Set 2	Set 3	Set 4	Set 5	Total	Report
05 May	13:00	Jeunesse Sportif Azazga	0–3	Seddouk Béjaïa Volleyball	14–25	23–25	11–25	–	–	48–75	
05 May	11:30	Association Sportive Wilaya Béjaïa	3–0	Association Sportive Ville Blida	25–5	25–14	25–18	–	–	75–37	
05 May	10:00	Ghalia Sportif Chlef	1–3	Raed Itihad Jameat El Jazair	22–25	25–10	13–25	18–25	–	78–85	

=== Round 3 ===
Date	Time		Score		Set 1	Set 2	Set 3	Set 4	Set 5	Total	Report
07 May	18:30	Association Sportive Ville Blida	–	Jeunesse Sportif Azazga	–	–	–	–	–	0–0	[]
07 May	15:30	Raed Itihad Jameat El Jazair	–	Association Sportive Wilaya Béjaïa	–	–	–	–	–	0–0	[]
07 May	17:00	Seddouk Béjaïa Volleyball	–	Ghalia Sportif Chlef	–	–	–	–	–	0–0	[]

=== Round 4 ===
Date	Time		Score		Set 1	Set 2	Set 3	Set 4	Set 5	Total	Report
08 May	15:00	Jeunesse Sportif Azazga	–	Ghalia Sportif Chlef	–	–	–	–	–	0–0	[]
08 May	11:30	Association Sportive Ville Blida	–	Raed Itihad Jameat El Jazair	–	–	–	–	–	0–0	[]
08 May	10:00	Association Sportive Wilaya Béjaïa	–	Seddouk Béjaïa Volleyball	–	–	–	–	–	0–0	[]

=== Round 5 ===
Date	Time		Score		Set 1	Set 2	Set 3	Set 4	Set 5	Total	Report
09 May	14:30	Raed Itihad Jameat El Jazair	–	Jeunesse Sportif Azazga	–	–	–	–	–	0–0	[]
09 May	13:00	Seddouk Béjaïa Volleyball	–	Association Sportive Ville Blida	–	–	–	–	–	0–0	[]
09 May	11:30	Ghalia Sportif Chlef	–	Association Sportive Wilaya Béjaïa	–	–	–	–	–	0–0	[]

=== Round 6 ===
Date	Time		Score		Set 1	Set 2	Set 3	Set 4	Set 5	Total	Report
19 May	10:00	Jeunesse Sportif Azazga	–	Association Sportive Wilaya Béjaïa	–	–	–	–	–	0–0	[]
19 May	11:30	Association Sportive Ville Blida	–	Ghalia Sportif Chlef	–	–	–	–	–	0–0	[]
19 May	13:00	Seddouk Béjaïa Volleyball	–	Raed Itihad Jameat El Jazair	–	–	–	–	–	0–0	[]

=== Round 7 ===
Date	Time		Score		Set 1	Set 2	Set 3	Set 4	Set 5	Total	Report
01 Jun	10:00	Seddouk Béjaïa Volleyball	–	Jeunesse Sportif Azazga	–	–	–	–	–	0–0	[]
01 Jun	11:30	Raed Itihad Jameat El Jazair	–	Ghalia Sportif Chlef	–	–	–	–	–	0–0	[]
01 Jun	14:30	Association Sportive Ville Blida	–	Association Sportive Wilaya Béjaïa	–	–	–	–	–	0–0	[]

=== Round 8 ===
Date	Time		Score		Set 1	Set 2	Set 3	Set 4	Set 5	Total	Report
02 Jun	10:00	Jeunesse Sportif Azazga	–	Association Sportive Ville Blida	–	–	–	–	–	0–0	[]
02 Jun	11:30	Association Sportive Wilaya Béjaïa	–	Raed Itihad Jameat El Jazair	–	–	–	–	–	0–0	[]
02 Jun	13:00	Ghalia Sportif Chlef	–	Seddouk Béjaïa Volleyball	–	–	–	–	–	0–0	[]

=== Round 9 ===
Date	Time		Score		Set 1	Set 2	Set 3	Set 4	Set 5	Total	Report
08 Jun	10:30	Ghalia Sportif Chlef	–	Jeunesse Sportif Azazga	–	–	–	–	–	0–0	[]
08 Jun	15:00	Seddouk Béjaïa Volleyball	–	Association Sportive Wilaya Béjaïa	–	–	–	–	–	0–0	[]
08 Jun	16:30	Raed Itihad Jameat El Jazair	–	Association Sportive Ville Blida	–	–	–	–	–	0–0	[]

== Round 10 ==
Date	Time		Score		Set 1	Set 2	Set 3	Set 4	Set 5	Total	Report
09 Jun	10:00	Jeunesse Sportif Azazga	–	Raed Itihad Jameat El Jazair	–	–	–	–	–	0–0	[]
09 Jun	11:30	Association Sportive Ville Blida	–	Seddouk Béjaïa Volleyball	–	–	–	–	–	0–0	[]
09 Jun	13:00	Association Sportive Wilaya Béjaïa	–	Ghalia Sportif Chlef	–	–	–	–	–	0–0	[]
