= 2008–09 Algerian Women's Volleyball League =

2008–09 Algerian League
- League: Algerian League
- Sport: Volleyball
- Duration: October 14, 2008 – March 20, 2009
- Teams: 8
- League champions: GS Pétroliers WVB (21st title)
- Runners-up: ASW Béjaïa

Algerian League seasons
- 2007–08 2009–10

The 2008/09 season of the Algerian Women's Volleyball League was the 47th annual season of the country's highest volleyball level.

== Round 1 ==
Date	Time		Score		Set 1	Set 2	Set 3	Set 4	Set 5	Total	Report
17 Oct	..:..	GS Pétroliers WVB	3–0	Raed Itihad Jameat El Jazair	–	–	–	–	–	0–0	
17 Oct	..:..	NC Béjaïa	3–0	ASW Béjaïa	–	–	–	–	–	0–0	
17 Oct	..:..	MB Béjaïa	3–0	AC Tizi Ouzou	–	–	–	–	–	0–0	
17 Oct	..:..	Star Sports Shalafi	1–3	ES Sétif	–	–	–	–	–	0–0	

== Round 2 ==
Date	Time		Score		Set 1	Set 2	Set 3	Set 4	Set 5	Total	Report
24 Oct	..:..	Raed Itihad Jameat El Jazair	2–3	ES Sétif	–	–	–	–	–	0–0	
24 Oct	..:..	AC Tizi Ouzou	1–3	Star Sports Shalafi	–	–	–	–	–	0–0	
24 Oct	..:..	ASW Béjaïa	0–3	MB Béjaïa	–	–	–	–	–	0–0	
24 Oct	..:..	GS Pétroliers WVB	3–1	NC Béjaïa	–	–	–	–	–	0–0	

== Round 3 ==
Date	Time		Score		Set 1	Set 2	Set 3	Set 4	Set 5	Total	Report
31 Oct	..:..	NC Béjaïa	3–0	Raed Itihad Jameat El Jazair	–	–	–	–	–	0–0	
31 Oct	..:..	MB Béjaïa	1–3	GS Pétroliers WVB	–	–	–	–	–	0–0	
31 Oct	..:..	Star Sports Shalafi	3–2	ASW Béjaïa	–	–	–	–	–	0–0	
31 Oct	..:..	ES Sétif	0–3	AC Tizi Ouzou	–	–	–	–	–	0–0	

== Round 4 ==
Date	Time		Score		Set 1	Set 2	Set 3	Set 4	Set 5	Total	Report
14 Nov	..:..	Raed Itihad Jameat El Jazair	2–3	AC Tizi Ouzou	–	–	–	–	–	0–0	
14 Nov	..:..	ASW Béjaïa	3–0	ES Sétif	–	–	–	–	–	0–0	
14 Nov	..:..	GS Pétroliers WVB	3–0	Star Sports Shalafi	–	–	–	–	–	0–0	
14 Nov	..:..	NC Béjaïa	2–3	MB Béjaïa	–	–	–	–	–	0–0	

== Round 5 ==
Date	Time		Score		Set 1	Set 2	Set 3	Set 4	Set 5	Total	Report
21 Nov	..:..	MB Béjaïa	3–0	Raed Itihad Jameat El Jazair	–	–	–	–	–	0–0	
21 Nov	..:..	Star Sports Shalafi	0–3	NC Béjaïa	–	–	–	–	–	0–0	
21 Nov	..:..	ES Sétif	0–3	GS Pétroliers WVB	–	–	–	–	–	0–0	
21 Nov	..:..	AC Tizi Ouzou	1–3	ASW Béjaïa	–	–	–	–	–	0–0	

== Round 6 ==
Date	Time		Score		Set 1	Set 2	Set 3	Set 4	Set 5	Total	Report
05 Dec	..:..	Raed Itihad Jameat El Jazair	0–3	ASW Béjaïa	–	–	–	–	–	0–0	
05 Dec	..:..	GS Pétroliers WVB	3–0	AC Tizi Ouzou	–	–	–	–	–	0–0	
05 Dec	..:..	MB Béjaïa	3–0	Star Sports Shalafi	–	–	–	–	–	0–0	
05 Dec	..:..	NC Béjaïa	3–0	ES Sétif	–	–	–	–	–	0–0	

== Round 7 ==
Date	Time		Score		Set 1	Set 2	Set 3	Set 4	Set 5	Total	Report
19 Dec	..:..	Star Sports Shalafi	3–0	Raed Itihad Jameat El Jazair	–	–	–	–	–	0–0	
19 Dec	..:..	ES Sétif	0–3	MB Béjaïa	–	–	–	–	–	0–0	
19 Dec	..:..	ASW Béjaïa	0–3	GS Pétroliers WVB	–	–	–	–	–	0–0	
19 Dec	..:..	AC Tizi Ouzou	–	NC Béjaïa	–	–	–	–	–	0–0	

== Round 8 ==
Date	Time		Score		Set 1	Set 2	Set 3	Set 4	Set 5	Total	Report
09 Jan	..:..	Raed Itihad Jameat El Jazair	0–3	GS Pétroliers WVB	–	–	–	–	–	0–0	
09 Jan	..:..	ASW Béjaïa	0–3	NC Béjaïa	–	–	–	–	–	0–0	
09 Jan	..:..	AC Tizi Ouzou	1–3	MB Béjaïa	–	–	–	–	–	0–0	
09 Jan	..:..	ES Sétif	0–3	Star Sports Shalafi	–	–	–	–	–	0–0	

== Round 9 ==
Date	Time		Score		Set 1	Set 2	Set 3	Set 4	Set 5	Total	Report
23 Jan	12:00	ES Sétif	3–0	Raed Itihad Jameat El Jazair	–	–	–	–	–	0–0	
23 Jan	12:00	Star Sports Shalafi	3–0	AC Tizi Ouzou	–	–	–	–	–	0–0	
23 Jan	12:00	MB Béjaïa	3–0	ASW Béjaïa	–	–	–	–	–	0–0	
23 Jan	12:00	NC Béjaïa	1–3	GS Pétroliers WVB	–	–	–	–	–	0–0	

== Round 10 ==
Date	Time		Score		Set 1	Set 2	Set 3	Set 4	Set 5	Total	Report
30 Jan	12:00	Raed Itihad Jameat El Jazair	0–3	NC Béjaïa	–	–	–	–	–	0–0	
30 Jan	12:00	GS Pétroliers WVB	3–0	MB Béjaïa	–	–	–	–	–	0–0	
30 Jan	12:00	ASW Béjaïa	2–3	Star Sports Shalafi	–	–	–	–	–	0–0	
30 Jan	12:00	AC Tizi Ouzou	Play suspended	ES Sétif	–	–	–	–	–	0–0	

== Round 11 ==
Date	Time		Score		Set 1	Set 2	Set 3	Set 4	Set 5	Total	Report
06 Feb	12:00	AC Tizi Ouzou	3–0	Raed Itihad Jameat El Jazair	–	–	–	–	–	0–0	
06 Feb	12:00	ES Sétif	0–3	ASW Béjaïa	–	–	–	–	–	0–0	
06 Feb	12:00	Star Sports Shalafi	0–3	GS Pétroliers WVB	–	–	–	–	–	0–0	
06 Feb	12:00	MB Béjaïa	1–3	NC Béjaïa	–	–	–	–	–	0–0	

== Round 12 ==
Date	Time		Score		Set 1	Set 2	Set 3	Set 4	Set 5	Total	Report
13 Feb	10:00	GS Pétroliers WVB	3–0	ES Sétif	–	–	–	–	–	0–0	
13 Feb	10:00	ASW Béjaïa	2–3	AC Tizi Ouzou	–	–	–	–	–	0–0	
13 Feb	10:00	NC Béjaïa	2–3	Star Sports Shalafi	–	–	–	–	–	0–0	
13 Feb	10:00	Raed Itihad Jameat El Jazair	1–3	MB Béjaïa	–	–	–	–	–	0–0	

== Round 13 ==
Date	Time		Score		Set 1	Set 2	Set 3	Set 4	Set 5	Total	Report
27 Feb	10:00	ASW Béjaïa	3–0	Raed Itihad Jameat El Jazair	–	–	–	–	–	0–0	
27 Feb	10:00	AC Tizi Ouzou	0–3	GS Pétroliers WVB	–	–	–	–	–	0–0	
27 Feb	10:00	ES Sétif	1–3	NC Béjaïa	–	–	–	–	–	0–0	
27 Feb	10:00	Star Sports Shalafi	2–3	MB Béjaïa	–	–	–	–	–	0–0	

== Round 14 ==
Date	Time		Score		Set 1	Set 2	Set 3	Set 4	Set 5	Total	Report
20 Mar	10:00	GS Pétroliers WVB	3–0	ASW Béjaïa	–	–	–	–	–	0–0	
20 Mar	10:00	MB Béjaïa	3–0	ES Sétif	–	–	–	–	–	0–0	
20 Mar	10:00	NC Béjaïa	3–0	AC Tizi Ouzou	–	–	–	–	–	0–0	
20 Mar	10:00	Raed Itihad Jameat El Jazair	0–3	Star Sports Shalafi	–	–	–	–	–	0–0	
