= Algerian Women's Volleyball League =

- Current season, competition or edition: 2024–25 Algerian Women's Volleyball League
- Sport: Volleyball
- Founded: 1962
- No. of teams: 16
- Country: Algeria
- Continent: Africa
- Most recent champion: NC Béjaïa (2025)
- Most titles: MC Alger (31)
- Website: Algerian Volleyball Federation

The Algerian Women's Volleyball League is the highest professional women's volleyball league in Algeria. It is run by the Algerian Volleyball Federation. It is considered one of the top national leagues in African volleyball, as its clubs have made significant success in African competitions.

== List of women's champions ==
Teams who won the league's annual championship include:

| Year | Gold | Silver | Bronze |
|---|---|---|---|
| 1962–63 | NA Hussein Dey | | |
| 1963–64 | NA Hussein Dey | | |
| 1964–65 | NA Hussein Dey | | |
| 1965–66 | NA Hussein Dey | | |
| 1966–67 | NA Hussein Dey | | |
| 1967–68 | NA Hussein Dey | | |
| 1968–69 | NA Hussein Dey | | |
| 1969–70 | NA Hussein Dey | | |
| 1970–71 | NA Hussein Dey | | |
| 1971–72 | NR Blida | | |
| 1972–73 | NR Blida | | |
| 1973–74 | | | |
| 1974–75 | | | |
| 1975–76 | El Djazair Riadha | | |
| 1976–77 | NA Hussein Dey | | |
| 1977–78 | MP Alger | | |
| 1978–79 | MP Alger | | |
| 1979–80 | MP Alger | | |
| 1980–81 | | | |
| 1981–82 | NADIT Alger | | |
| 1982–83 | MP Alger | | |
| 1983–84 | AJ Constantine | | |
| 1984–85 | MP Alger | | |
| 1985–86 | MP Alger | | |
| 1986–87 | MP Alger | | |
| 1987–88 | MP Alger | | |
| 1988–89 | MC Alger | | |
| 1989–90 | MC Alger | | |
| 1990–91 | ASW Béjaïa | | |
| 1991–92 | MC Alger | | |
| 1992–93 | MC Alger | | |
| 1993–94 | ASW Béjaïa | | |
| 1994–95 | ASW Béjaïa | | |
| 1995–96 | ASW Béjaïa | MB Béjaïa | |
| 1996–97 | MC Alger | | |
| 1997–98 | MC Alger | | |
| 1998–99 | ASW Béjaïa | | |
| 1999–00 | MC Alger | | |
| 2000–01 | MC Alger | NC Béjaïa | ASW Béjaïa |
| 2001–02 | MC Alger | | |
| 2002–03 | MC Alger | MB Béjaïa | |
| 2003–04 | NC Béjaïa | | |
| 2004–05 | NC Béjaïa | | |
| 2005–06 | GS Chlef | MB Béjaïa | |
| 2006–07 | MC Alger | NC Béjaïa | |
| 2007–08 | MC Alger | NC Béjaïa | |
| 2008–09 | GS Pétroliers | ASW Béjaïa | NC Béjaïa |
| 2009–10 | GS Pétroliers | NC Béjaïa | ASW Béjaïa |
| 2010–11 | GS Pétroliers | NC Béjaïa | |
| 2011–12 | MB Béjaïa | GS Pétroliers | NC Béjaïa |
| 2012–13 | GS Pétroliers | Nedjmet Riadhi Chlef | MB Béjaïa |
| 2013–14 | GS Pétroliers | MB Béjaïa | Nedjmet Riadhi Chlef |
| 2014–15 | GS Pétroliers | ASW Béjaïa | MB Béjaïa |
| 2015–16 | ASW Béjaïa | GS Pétroliers | MB Béjaïa |
| 2016–17 | GS Pétroliers | MB Béjaïa | NC Béjaïa |
| 2017–18 | GS Pétroliers | MB Béjaïa | NR Chlef |
| 2018–19 | GS Pétroliers | | |
| 2019–20 | GS Pétroliers | | |
| 2020–21 | Cancelled due to the COVID-19 pandemic in Algeria | | |
| 2021–22 | MC Alger | MB Béjaïa | WA Béjaïa |
| 2022–23 | US Tichy | ASW Béjaïa | |
| 2023–24 | MB Béjaïa | MC Alger | |
| 2024–25 | NC Béjaïa | MC Alger | |
| 2025–26 | | | |

== Titles by team ==
| Club | Winners | Winning years |
|---|---|---|
| MC Alger | 31 | 1978, 1979, 1980, 1983, 1985, 1986, 1987, 1988, 1989, 1990, 1992, 1993, 1997, 1998, 2000, 2001, 2002, 2003, 2007, 2008, 2009, 2010, 2011, 2013, 2014, 2015, 2017, 2018, 2019, 2019, 2022 |
| NA Hussein Dey | 10 | 1963, 1964, 1965, 1966, 1967, 1968, 1969, 1970, 1971, 1977 |
| ASW Béjaïa | 6 | 1991, 1994, 1995, 1996, 1999, 2016 |
| NC Béjaïa | 3 | 2004, 2005, 2025 |
| USM Blida | 2 | 1972, 1973 |
| MB Béjaïa | 2 | 2012, 2024 |
| El Djazair Riadha | 1 | 1976 |
| NADIT Alger | 1 | 1982 |
| AJ Constantine | 1 | 1984 |
| GS Chlef | 1 | 2006 |
| US Tichy | 1 | 2023 |

== Members of the Algerian Women's Volleyball League (2021–22 season) ==
These are the teams that participate in the 2021–22 Algerian Women's Volleyball League season.

=== Group Center-West ===
| Team | Location | Hall | Stadium capacity |
|---|---|---|---|
| ATM Aïn El Turk | Aïn El Turk | Salle OMS de Aïn El Turk | |
| USP Akbou | Akbou | Salle OMS de l'OPOD | |
| MC Alger | Algiers | Salle Hacène Harcha | 8.500 |
| JS Azazga | Azazga | Salle Omnisport de Azazga | |
| ES Ben Aknoun | Ben Aknoun | Salle Omnisports Mokhtar Aribi (El Biar) | |
| NR Chlef | Chlef | Salle OMS Chettia | |
| JSN El Hamri | Oran | Salle CREPS de Aïn El Turk | |
| Seddouk VB | Béjaïa | Salle du CSP Amirouche | |

=== Group Center-East ===
| Team | Location | Hall | Stadium capacity |
|---|---|---|---|
| ASW Béjaïa | Béjaïa | Salle Bleue de Béjaïa | |
| MB Béjaïa | Béjaïa | Salle du CSP Amirouche | |
| NC Béjaïa | Béjaïa | Salle Bleue de Béjaïa | |
| RC Béjaïa | Béjaïa | Salle OPOW de Béjaïa | |
| WA Béjaïa | Béjaïa | Salle OPOW de Béjaïa | |
| Hassi Messaoud VB | Hassi Messaoud | Salle Omnisports de Hassi Messaoud | |
| OS Tichy | Béjaïa | Salle OPOW de Béjaïa | |
| CRR Toudja | Toudja | Salle du CSP (El Kseur) | |

== See also ==
- Algerian Men's Volleyball League
