= MC Alger (men's volleyball) =

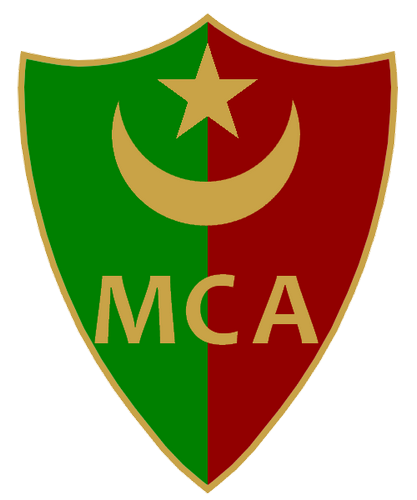
- Full name: Mouloudia Club d'Alger
- Short name: MCA
- Founded: 1947; 78 years ago, as Mouloudia Club d'Alger; 2008; 17 years ago, as GS Pétroliers
- Ground: Hacène Harcha Arena, Algiers
- Chairman: Djaffar Bel Hocine

Uniforms
Home	Away

Mouloudia Club d'Alger (Arabic: نادي مولودية الجزائر), referred to as MC Alger or MCA for short, is an Algerian volleyball team that was founded on 1947, as a division of MC Alger. They play their home games in Hacène Harcha Arena, which has a capacity of 8,000 people.

== History ==
From 2008 to 2020, the team was known as GS Pétroliers as it was part of the multi-sports club with that name.

The team's name changed back to MC Alger in 2020.

== Previous names ==
- Mouloudia Chaâbia d'Alger (1947-1977)
- Mouloudia Pétroliers d'Alger (1977-1988)
- Mouloudia Club d'Alger (1988-2008)
- Groupement Sportif des Pétroliers (2008–2020present)

== Honors ==
=== National achievements ===
- Algerian Championship :

Winners (10 titles) : (1989, 1991, 1995, 2003, 2004, 2005, 2006, 2007, 2008, 2013)

- Algerian Cup :

Winners (11 titles) : (1984, 1988, 1989, 1990, 1991, 1995, 1996, 2003, 2005, 2007, 2010)

=== International achievements ===
- African Club Championship :

Winners (2 titles) : (1988, 2007)
Runners up (4x vice champions) : (1989, 1990, 1991, 1997)

== Head coaches ==
Dates	Name	Note
? - 2007	(Algeria) Krimou Bernaoui	Went to a club in the United Arab Emirates
2007 - ?	(Algeria) Tarek Nehai	Former player (in the 1990s)
	(Algeria)	
	(Algeria)	
	(Algeria)	
	(Algeria)	

As of 2014

== Notable players ==
- (Algeria) Tarek Nehai
