= ASV Blida =

Union sportive de la médina de Blida volley-ball
- Full name: U.S.M.B
- Founded: 1967
- Ground: Salle Hocine Chalane de l'OPOW (Capacity: 3.000)
- Manager: (Algeria)
- League: Algerian Men's Volleyball League

Uniforms
Home	Away

Association Sportive Ville de Blida (Arabic: الجمعية الرياضية لمدينة البليدة لكرة الطائرة) or ASV Blida for a short is a professional Volleyball team based in Blida, Algeria. It plays in Algerian Men's Volleyball League. The team won the 2002 African Cup Winners' Cup title. The club was founded in 1967 under the name of USM Blida.

== Honors ==
=== National Men's Achievements ===
- Algerian Championship :

Winners (5 titles) : (1994, 1997, 1998, 2001, 2002)

- Algerian Cup :

Winners (3 titles) : (1997, 1999, 2002)

International Men's competitions

- African Cup Winners' Cup :

Winners (1 title) : (2002)

=== National Women's Achievements ===
- Algerian Championship :

Winners (2 titles) : (1972, 1973)

- Algerian Cup :

Winners (1 title) : (1973)
