= MB Béjaïa =

Mechâal Baladiat Béjaïa
- Full name: Mechâal Baladiat Béjaïa
- Short name: MB Béjaïa
- Nickname: MBB
- Founded: 1977
- Ground: Salle CSP Amirouche, Béjaïa (Capacity: 1.500)
- Chairman: (Algeria)
- Manager: (Algeria)
- League: Algerian League

Mechâal Baladiat Béjaïa is a volleyball team in Algeria.

== Previous names ==
- Mechâal Baladiat Béjaïa (1977–Present)

== Honors ==
=== National achievements ===
- Algerian Championship :

Winners (1 title) : (2012)
Runners up (3 vice champions) : (1996, 2003, 2006)

- Algerian Cup :

Runners up (1 vice champions) : (2003)

== Notable players ==
- (Algeria) Mouni Abderrahim
- (Algeria) Fatima Zahra Djouad
- (Algeria) Narimène Madani
- (Algeria) Nawal Mansouri
