= Algeria at the 2008 Summer Olympics =

- IOC code: ALG
- NOC: Algerian Olympic Committee
- Website: www.coa.dz

in Beijing
- Competitors: 62 in 13 sports
- Flag bearers: Salim Iles (opening); Abdelhafid Benchabla (closing)
- Medals Ranked 64th: Gold 0 Silver 1 Bronze 1 Total 2

Summer Olympics appearances (overview)
- 1964; 1968; 1972; 1976; 1980; 1984; 1988; 1992; 1996; 2000; 2004; 2008; 2012; 2016; 2020; 2024

Other related appearances
- France (1896–1960)

Algeria competed in the 2008 Summer Olympics, held in Beijing, People's Republic of China, from 8 to 24 August 2008.

== Medalists ==
Medal	Name	Sport	Event	Date
Silver	Amar Benikhlef	Judo	Men's 90 kg	13 August
Bronze	Soraya Haddad	Judo	Women's 52 kg	10 August

Medals by sport
Sport	1st place, gold medalist(s)	2nd place, silver medalist(s)	3rd place, bronze medalist(s)	Total
Judo	0	1	1	2
Total	0	1	1	2

== Athletics ==
Key

- Note–Ranks given for track events are within the athlete's heat only
- Q = Qualified for the next round
- q = Qualified for the next round as a fastest loser or, in field events, by position without achieving the qualifying target
- NR = National record
- N/A = Round not applicable for the event
- Bye = Athlete not required to compete in round

Men
Track & road events

Athlete	Event	Heat		Semifinal		Final	
Athlete	Event	Result	Rank	Result	Rank	Result	Rank
Khoudir Aggoune	10000 m	—N/a				DNS	
Mohamed Ameur	20 km walk	—N/a				1:32.21	48
Tarek Boukensa	1500 m	3:36.11	4 Q	3:39.73	8	Did not advance	
Kamel Boulahfane	1500 m	3:45.59	11	Did not advance			
Nabil Madi	800 m	1:45.75	3 q	1:45.63	1 Q	1:45.96	7
Rabie Makhloufi	3000 m steeplechase	8:29.74	8	—N/a		Did not advance	
Nadjim Manseur	800 m	1:45.75	3 q	1:45.54	4 q	1:47.19	8
Ali Saïdi-Sief	5000 m	14:15.00	12	—N/a		Did not advance	
Antar Zerguelaïne	800 m	DNS		Did not advance			
Antar Zerguelaïne	1500 m	3:42.30	5 Q	3:40.64	11	Did not advance	

Field events

Athlete	Event	Qualification		Final	
Athlete	Event	Distance	Position	Distance	Position
Issam Nima	Long jump	DNS		Did not advance	

Women
Track & road events

Athlete	Event	Heat		Final	
Athlete	Event	Result	Rank	Result	Rank
Souad Aït Salem	Marathon	—N/a		2:28.29	9
Widad Mendil	3000 m steeplechase	9:52.35	17	Did not advance	
Nahida Touhami	1500 m	4:18.99	11	Did not advance	

Field events

Athlete	Event	Qualification		Final	
Athlete	Event	Distance	Position	Distance	Position
Baya Rahouli	Triple jump	13.87	22	Did not advance	

== Badminton ==
Athlete	Event	Round of 64	Round of 32	Round of 16	Quarterfinal	Semifinal	Final / BM	
Athlete	Event	Opposition Score	Opposition Score	Opposition Score	Opposition Score	Opposition Score	Opposition Score	Rank
Nabil Lasmari	Men's singles	Bye	Gade (DEN); L 6–21, 4–21	Did not advance				

== Boxing ==
Algeria qualified eight boxers for the Olympic boxing tournament. All eight qualified at the 1st AIBA African Olympic Boxing Qualifying Tournament.

Athlete	Event	Round of 32	Round of 16	Quarterfinals	Semifinals	Final	
Athlete	Event	Opposition Result	Opposition Result	Opposition Result	Opposition Result	Opposition Result	Rank
Abdelhalim Ouradi	Bantamweight	Nevin (IRL); L 4–9	Did not advance				
Abdelkader Chadi	Featherweight	Bye	Adi (THA); W 7–6	Kılıç (TUR); L 6–13	Did not advance		
Hamza Kramou	Lightweight	Ugás (CUB); L 3–21	Did not advance				
Nabil Kassel	Middleweight	Bye	Sutherland (IRL); L 14–21	Did not advance			
Abdelhafid Benchebla	Light heavyweight	Kumar (IND); W 23–3	Yasser (EGY); W 13–6	Zhang Xp (CHN); L 7–12	Did not advance		
Abdelaziz Touilbini	Heavyweight	—N/a	Wilder (USA); L 4–10	Did not advance			
Newfel Ouatah	Super heavyweight	—N/a	Payares (VEN); W 7–5	Glazkov (UKR); L 4–10	Did not advance		

== Cycling ==
=== Road ===
Athlete	Event	Time	Rank
Hichem Chaabane	Men's road race	Did not finish	

== Fencing ==
Women

Athlete	Event	Round of 64	Round of 32	Round of 16	Quarterfinal	Semifinal	Final / BM	
Athlete	Event	Opposition Score	Opposition Score	Opposition Score	Opposition Score	Opposition Score	Opposition Score	Rank
Hadia Bentaleb	Individual épée	—N/a	Szász (HUN); L 4–15	Did not advance				
Anissa Khelfaoui	Individual foil	Thompson (USA); L 2–11	Did not advance					

== Judo ==
Men

Athlete	Event	Preliminary	Round of 32	Round of 16	Quarterfinals	Semifinals	Repechage 1	Repechage 2	Repechage 3	Final / BM	
Athlete	Event	Opposition Result	Opposition Result	Opposition Result	Opposition Result	Opposition Result	Opposition Result	Opposition Result	Opposition Result	Opposition Result	Rank
Omar Rebahi	−60 kg	Bye	Sobirov (UZB); L 0000–1001	Did not advance							
Mounir Benamadi	−66 kg	Bye	Brown (AUS); W 1010–0000	Sharipov (UZB); L 0000–0001	Did not advance						
Amar Meridja	−73 kg	—N/a	Siamionau (BLR); L 0010–0102	Did not advance							
Amar Benikhlef	−90 kg	—N/a	El Assri (MAR); W 0011–0001	Alarza (ESP); W 1020–0001	Aschwanden (SUI); W 0001–0000	Dafreville (FRA); W 1000–0000	Bye			Tsirekidze (GEO); L 0000–0001	2nd place, silver medalist(s)
Hassane Azzoun	−100 kg	—N/a	Miraliyev (AZE); L 0001–1000	Did not advance			Zhorzholiani (GEO); L 0001–1001	Did not advance			

Women

Athlete	Event	Round of 32	Round of 16	Quarterfinals	Semifinals	Repechage 1	Repechage 2	Repechage 3	Final / BM	
Athlete	Event	Opposition Result	Opposition Result	Opposition Result	Opposition Result	Opposition Result	Opposition Result	Opposition Result	Opposition Result	Rank
Meriem Moussa	−48 kg	Ilendou (GAB); W 0011–0000	Baschin (GER); L 0000–0101	Did not advance						
Soraya Haddad	−52 kg	Müller (LUX); W 0211–0000	Diedhiou (SEN); W 0010–0001	Kim K-O (KOR); W 0210–0001	Xian Dm (CHN); L 0000–1001	Bye			Kaliyeva (KAZ); W 0121–0010	3rd place, bronze medalist(s)
Lila Latrous	−57 kg	Xu Y (CHN); L 0001–1001	Did not advance			Koivumäki (FIN); L 0000–0001	Did not advance			
Kahina Saidi	−63 kg	Bezzina (MLT); W 0200–0000	Willeboordse (NED); L 0001–1100	Did not advance						
Rachida Ouerdane	−70 kg	Bye	Bosch (NED); L 0010–0110	Did not advance		Nasiga (FIJ); W 1001–0000	Rousey (USA); L 0000–1001	Did not advance		

== Rowing ==
Men

Athlete	Event	Heats		Repechage		Quarterfinals		Semifinals		Final	
Athlete	Event	Time	Rank	Time	Rank	Time	Rank	Time	Rank	Time	Rank
Chaouki Dries	Single sculls	7:57.65	5 SE/F	—N/a		Bye		7:34.84	3 FE	7:32.82	29
Kamel Ait-Daoud; Mohamed Garidi	Lightweight double sculls	6:43.94	5 R	7:05.73	6 SC/D	—N/a		6:43.80	4 FD	6:47.44	19

Qualification Legend: FA=Final A (medal); FB=Final B (non-medal); FC=Final C (non-medal); FD=Final D (non-medal); FE=Final E (non-medal); FF=Final F (non-medal); SA/B=Semifinals A/B; SC/D=Semifinals C/D; SE/F=Semifinals E/F; QF=Quarterfinals; R=Repechage

== Swimming ==
Men

Athlete	Event	Heat		Semifinal		Final	
Athlete	Event	Time	Rank	Time	Rank	Time	Rank
Sofiane Daid	100 m breaststroke	1:02.45	44	Did not advance			
Sofiane Daid	200 m breaststroke	2:16.15	50	Did not advance			
Mehdi Hamama	200 m individual medley	2:04.91	41	Did not advance			
Salim Iles	50 m freestyle	22.35	=23	Did not advance			
Nabil Kebbab	100 m freestyle	49.38	32	Did not advance			
Mahrez Mebarek	200 m freestyle	1:52.66	51	Did not advance			

== Table tennis ==
Athlete	Event	Preliminary round	Round 1	Round 2	Round 3	Round 4	Quarterfinals	Semifinals	Final / BM	
Athlete	Event	Opposition Result	Opposition Result	Opposition Result	Opposition Result	Opposition Result	Opposition Result	Opposition Result	Opposition Result	Rank
Idir Khourta	Men's singles	Henzell (AUS); L 1–4	Did not advance							

== Volleyball ==
=== Women's indoor tournament ===
Algeria entered a team in the women's tournament. The team lost all five matches in the group play, and finished last in their group. The team's final ranking was tied for 11th place.

Roster

The following is the Algerian roster in the women's volleyball tournament of the 2008 Summer Olympics.

Head Coach: Mouloud Ikhedji

№	Name	Date of birth	Height	Weight	Spike	Block	2008 club
1	Mélinda Hennaoui	18 March 1990	1.75 m (5 ft 9 in)	68 kg (150 lb)	288 cm (113 in)	270 cm (110 in)	(France) Istres Volleyball
2	Sehryne Hanaoui	10 January 1988	1.72 m (5 ft 8 in)	69 kg (152 lb)	280 cm (110 in)	266 cm (105 in)	(France) Istres Volleyball
4	Nassima Ben Hamouda	20 October 1973	1.80 m (5 ft 11 in)	67 kg (148 lb)	299 cm (118 in)	287 cm (113 in)	(Algeria) GSP Algiers
7	Raouia Rouabhia	25 June 1978	1.78 m (5 ft 10 in)	67 kg (148 lb)	296 cm (117 in)	286 cm (113 in)	(France) Venelle
9	Narimène Madani (c)	12 March 1984	1.76 m (5 ft 9 in)	62 kg (137 lb)	298 cm (117 in)	287 cm (113 in)	(Algeria) NC Bejaïa
10	Fatima-Zohra Oukazi	18 January 1984	1.75 m (5 ft 9 in)	67 kg (148 lb)	295 cm (116 in)	283 cm (111 in)	(Algeria) GSP Algiers
11	Mouni Abderrahim	19 November 1985	1.73 m (5 ft 8 in)	60 kg (130 lb)	300 cm (120 in)	290 cm (110 in)	(Algeria) ASW Bejaïa
12	Safia Boukhima	10 January 1991	1.76 m (5 ft 9 in)	64 kg (141 lb)	294 cm (116 in)	284 cm (112 in)	(Algeria) ASW Bejaïa
13	Nawal Mansouri (L)	1 August 1985	1.72 m (5 ft 8 in)	65 kg (143 lb)	291 cm (115 in)	281 cm (111 in)	(Algeria) NC Bejaïa
14	Faïza Tsabet	22 March 1985	1.83 m (6 ft 0 in)	79 kg (174 lb)	305 cm (120 in)	286 cm (113 in)	(France) Istres Volleyball
17	Lydia Oulmou	2 February 1986	1.86 m (6 ft 1 in)	70 kg (150 lb)	305 cm (120 in)	294 cm (116 in)	(France) Istres Volleyball
18	Tassadit Aïssou	19 June 1989	1.83 m (6 ft 0 in)	70 kg (150 lb)	295 cm (116 in)	285 cm (112 in)	(Algeria) ASW Bejaïa

Group play

Pos	Team	Pld	W	L	Pts	SPW	SPL	SPR	SW	SL	SR	Qualification
1	Brazil	5	5	0	10	377	226	1.668	15	0	MAX	Quarterfinals
2	Italy	5	4	1	9	372	315	1.181	12	4	3.000	Quarterfinals
3	Russia	5	3	2	8	353	312	1.131	10	6	1.667	Quarterfinals
4	Serbia	5	2	3	7	343	349	0.983	6	10	0.600	Quarterfinals
5	Kazakhstan	5	1	4	6	323	404	0.800	4	13	0.308	
6	Algeria	5	0	5	5	230	392	0.587	1	15	0.067	

9 August 2008; 12:30	Algeria	0–3	Brazil	Capital Indoor Stadium; Attendance: 12,000; Referees: Liu Jiang (China), Ibrahim al-Naama (Qatar)
9 August 2008; 12:30	(11–25, 11–25, 10–25) result statistics			Capital Indoor Stadium; Attendance: 12,000; Referees: Liu Jiang (China), Ibrahim al-Naama (Qatar)

11 August 2008; 10:00	Algeria	0–3	Serbia	Beijing Institute of Technology Gymnasium; Attendance: 3,100; Referees: Janpen Jirakakul (Thailand), Liu Jiang (China)
11 August 2008; 10:00	(14–25, 13–25, 13–25) result statistics			Beijing Institute of Technology Gymnasium; Attendance: 3,100; Referees: Janpen Jirakakul (Thailand), Liu Jiang (China)

13 August 2008; 10:00	Italy	3–0	Algeria	Beijing Institute of Technology Gymnasium; Attendance: 3,400; Referees: Karin Zahorcova (Czech Republic), Janpen Jirakakul (Thailand)
13 August 2008; 10:00	(25–7, 25–20, 25–12) result statistics			Beijing Institute of Technology Gymnasium; Attendance: 3,400; Referees: Karin Zahorcova (Czech Republic), Janpen Jirakakul (Thailand)

15 August 2008; 10:00	Algeria	0–3	Russia	Beijing Institute of Technology Gymnasium; Attendance: 3,500; Referees: Patricia Salvatore (United States), Osamu Sakaide (Japan)
15 August 2008; 10:00	(11–25, 19–25, 10–25) result statistics			Beijing Institute of Technology Gymnasium; Attendance: 3,500; Referees: Patricia Salvatore (United States), Osamu Sakaide (Japan)

17 August 2008; 10:00	Kazakhstan	3–1	Algeria	Beijing Institute of Technology Gymnasium; Attendance: 3,500; Referees: Patricia Salvatore (United States), Massimo Menghini (Italy)
17 August 2008; 10:00	(25–18, 25–20, 17–25, 25–16) result statistics			Beijing Institute of Technology Gymnasium; Attendance: 3,500; Referees: Patricia Salvatore (United States), Massimo Menghini (Italy)

== Weightlifting ==
Athlete	Event	Snatch		Clean & jerk		Total	Rank
Athlete	Event	Result	Rank	Result	Rank	Total	Rank
Leila Lassouani	Women's −63 kg	85	16	~~110~~	DNF	85	DNF

== Wrestling ==
Key:

- VT - Victory by Fall.
- PP - Decision by Points - the loser with technical points.
- PO - Decision by Points - the loser without technical points.

Men's Greco-Roman

Athlete	Event	Qualification	Round of 16	Quarterfinal	Semifinal	Repechage 1	Repechage 2	Final / BM	
Athlete	Event	Opposition Result	Opposition Result	Opposition Result	Opposition Result	Opposition Result	Opposition Result	Opposition Result	Rank
Mohamed Serir	−66 kg	Bye	Kovalenko (RUS); L 0–3 ^{PO}	Did not advance					20
Messaoud Zeghdane	−74 kg	Bye	Schneider (GER); L 1–3 ^{PP}	Did not advance					20
Samir Bouguerra	−96 kg	Bye	Jiang Hc (CHN); L 0–3 ^{PO}	Did not advance					19

== See also ==
- Algeria at the 2008 Summer Paralympics
