= 2011 FIVB Volleyball Women's World Cup squads =

This article shows the rosters of all participating teams at the 2011 FIVB Volleyball Women's World Cup in Japan.

== Algeria ==
The following is the Algeria roster in the 2011 FIVB World Cup.

#	Name	Date of birth	Height	Weight	Spike	Block
2	Yasmine Oudni	2 August 1989	182 cm (6 ft 0 in)	67 kg (148 lb)	250 cm (8 ft 2 in)	240 cm (7 ft 10 in)
3	Salima Hammouche	17 January 1984	158 cm (5 ft 2 in)	54 kg (119 lb)	270 cm (8 ft 10 in)	265 cm (8 ft 8 in)
4	Fatma Zahra Djouad	12 July 1988	180 cm (5 ft 11 in)	62 kg (137 lb)	295 cm (9 ft 8 in)	285 cm (9 ft 4 in)
5	Melinda Raissa Hennaoui	18 March 1990	178 cm (5 ft 10 in)	68 kg (150 lb)	295 cm (9 ft 8 in)	284 cm (9 ft 4 in)
6	Silya Magnana	16 March 1991	181 cm (5 ft 11 in)	68 kg (150 lb)	274 cm (9 ft 0 in)	261 cm (8 ft 7 in)
10	Fatima Zahra Oukazi	18 January 1984	175 cm (5 ft 9 in)	67 kg (148 lb)	295 cm (9 ft 8 in)	283 cm (9 ft 3 in)
11	Mouni Abderrahim	19 November 1985	171 cm (5 ft 7 in)	60 kg (130 lb)	305 cm (10 ft 0 in)	293 cm (9 ft 7 in)
12	Safia Boukhima	10 January 1991	176 cm (5 ft 9 in)	64 kg (141 lb)	294 cm (9 ft 8 in)	284 cm (9 ft 4 in)
14	Faiza Tsabet	22 March 1985	181 cm (5 ft 11 in)	77 kg (170 lb)	309 cm (10 ft 2 in)	295 cm (9 ft 8 in)
15	Aicha Mezemate	6 June 1991	187 cm (6 ft 2 in)	75 kg (165 lb)	300 cm (9 ft 10 in)	285 cm (9 ft 4 in)
17	Lydia Oulmou	2 February 1986	186 cm (6 ft 1 in)	74 kg (163 lb)	310 cm (10 ft 2 in)	305 cm (10 ft 0 in)
18	Tassadit Aissou	19 June 1989	184 cm (6 ft 0 in)	80 kg (180 lb)	295 cm (9 ft 8 in)	285 cm (9 ft 4 in)

== Argentina ==
The following is the Argentina roster in the 2011 FIVB World Cup.

#	Name	Date of birth	Height	Weight	Spike	Block
1	Lucia Gaido	19 January 1988	164 cm (5 ft 5 in)	53 kg (117 lb)	245 cm (8 ft 0 in)	244 cm (8 ft 0 in)
3	Paula Yamila Nizetich	27 January 1989	181 cm (5 ft 11 in)	74 kg (163 lb)	305 cm (10 ft 0 in)	295 cm (9 ft 8 in)
4	Maria Jimena Perez	6 February 1984	176 cm (5 ft 9 in)	64 kg (141 lb)	290 cm (9 ft 6 in)	275 cm (9 ft 0 in)
5	Lucia Fresco	14 May 1991	195 cm (6 ft 5 in)	92 kg (203 lb)	304 cm (10 ft 0 in)	290 cm (9 ft 6 in)
8	Tatiana Soledad Rizzo	30 December 1986	178 cm (5 ft 10 in)	64 kg (141 lb)	280 cm (9 ft 2 in)	268 cm (8 ft 10 in)
10	Emilce Sosa	11 September 1987	177 cm (5 ft 10 in)	72 kg (159 lb)	305 cm (10 ft 0 in)	295 cm (9 ft 8 in)
12	Antonella Bortolozzi	22 January 1986	182 cm (6 ft 0 in)	72 kg (159 lb)	298 cm (9 ft 9 in)	278 cm (9 ft 1 in)
13	Leticia Boscacci	8 November 1985	186 cm (6 ft 1 in)	70 kg (150 lb)	302 cm (9 ft 11 in)	284 cm (9 ft 4 in)
14	Florencia Carlotto	14 October 1988	183 cm (6 ft 0 in)	72 kg (159 lb)	302 cm (9 ft 11 in)	291 cm (9 ft 7 in)
16	Florencia Natasha Busquets Reyes	27 June 1989	192 cm (6 ft 4 in)	68 kg (150 lb)	305 cm (10 ft 0 in)	290 cm (9 ft 6 in)
17	Antonela Ayelen Curatola	23 October 1991	175 cm (5 ft 9 in)	71 kg (157 lb)	290 cm (9 ft 6 in)	280 cm (9 ft 2 in)
18	Yael Castiglione	27 September 1985	184 cm (6 ft 0 in)	75 kg (165 lb)	295 cm (9 ft 8 in)	281 cm (9 ft 3 in)

== Brazil ==
The following is the Brazil roster in the 2011 FIVB World Cup.

#	Name	Date of birth	Height	Weight	Spike	Block
1	Fabiana Claudino	24 January 1985	193 cm (6 ft 4 in)	76 kg (168 lb)	314 cm (10 ft 4 in)	293 cm (9 ft 7 in)
2	Juciely Cristina Barreto	18 December 1980	184 cm (6 ft 0 in)	71 kg (157 lb)	312 cm (10 ft 3 in)	289 cm (9 ft 6 in)
3	Danielle Lins	5 January 1985	181 cm (5 ft 11 in)	68 kg (150 lb)	290 cm (9 ft 6 in)	276 cm (9 ft 1 in)
4	Paula Pequeno	22 January 1982	184 cm (6 ft 0 in)	74 kg (163 lb)	302 cm (9 ft 11 in)	285 cm (9 ft 4 in)
5	Adenizia da Silva	18 December 1986	185 cm (6 ft 1 in)	63 kg (139 lb)	312 cm (10 ft 3 in)	290 cm (9 ft 6 in)
6	Thaisa Menezes	15 May 1987	196 cm (6 ft 5 in)	79 kg (174 lb)	316 cm (10 ft 4 in)	301 cm (9 ft 11 in)
7	Marianne Steinbrecher	23 August 1983	188 cm (6 ft 2 in)	70 kg (150 lb)	310 cm (10 ft 2 in)	290 cm (9 ft 6 in)
10	Welissa Gonzaga	9 September 1982	179 cm (5 ft 10 in)	76 kg (168 lb)	300 cm (9 ft 10 in)	287 cm (9 ft 5 in)
11	Tandara Caixeta	30 October 1988	184 cm (6 ft 0 in)	87 kg (192 lb)	305 cm (10 ft 0 in)	297 cm (9 ft 9 in)
13	Sheilla Castro	1 July 1983	185 cm (6 ft 1 in)	64 kg (141 lb)	302 cm (9 ft 11 in)	284 cm (9 ft 4 in)
14	Fabiana Oliveira	7 March 1980	169 cm (5 ft 7 in)	59 kg (130 lb)	276 cm (9 ft 1 in)	266 cm (8 ft 9 in)
16	Fernanda Rodrigues	10 May 1986	179 cm (5 ft 10 in)	74 kg (163 lb)	308 cm (10 ft 1 in)	288 cm (9 ft 5 in)
17	Fabiola de Sousa	3 February 1983	183 cm (6 ft 0 in)	79 kg (174 lb)	292 cm (9 ft 7 in)	277 cm (9 ft 1 in)
18	Camila Brait	28 October 1988	170 cm (5 ft 7 in)	58 kg (128 lb)	271 cm (8 ft 11 in)	256 cm (8 ft 5 in)

== China ==
The following is the China roster in the 2011 FIVB World Cup.

#	Name	Date of birth	Height	Weight	Spike	Block
1	Wang Yimei	11 January 1988	190 cm (6 ft 3 in)	87 kg (192 lb)	318 cm (10 ft 5 in)	305 cm (10 ft 0 in)
2	Mi Yang	24 January 1989	180 cm (5 ft 11 in)	70 kg (150 lb)	305 cm (10 ft 0 in)	298 cm (9 ft 9 in)
3	Yang Jie	1 March 1994	194 cm (6 ft 4 in)	82 kg (181 lb)	312 cm (10 ft 3 in)	300 cm (9 ft 10 in)
4	Hui Ruoqi	4 March 1991	189 cm (6 ft 2 in)	70 kg (150 lb)	312 cm (10 ft 3 in)	305 cm (10 ft 0 in)
7	Zhang Xian	16 March 1985	168 cm (5 ft 6 in)	57 kg (126 lb)	290 cm (9 ft 6 in)	280 cm (9 ft 2 in)
8	Wei Qiuyue	26 September 1988	182 cm (6 ft 0 in)	65 kg (143 lb)	305 cm (10 ft 0 in)	300 cm (9 ft 10 in)
9	Yang Junjing	15 May 1989	190 cm (6 ft 3 in)	70 kg (150 lb)	308 cm (10 ft 1 in)	300 cm (9 ft 10 in)
10	Shan Danna	8 October 1991	168 cm (5 ft 6 in)	60 kg (130 lb)	290 cm (9 ft 6 in)	285 cm (9 ft 4 in)
11	Xu Yunli	2 August 1987	196 cm (6 ft 5 in)	75 kg (165 lb)	317 cm (10 ft 5 in)	315 cm (10 ft 4 in)
13	Yang Zhou	21 April 1992	187 cm (6 ft 2 in)	71 kg (157 lb)	308 cm (10 ft 1 in)	295 cm (9 ft 8 in)
14	Chen Liyi	27 April 1989	184 cm (6 ft 0 in)	75 kg (165 lb)	302 cm (9 ft 11 in)	290 cm (9 ft 6 in)
15	Ma Yunwen	19 October 1986	190 cm (6 ft 3 in)	76 kg (168 lb)	315 cm (10 ft 4 in)	307 cm (10 ft 1 in)
17	Zhang Lei	11 January 1985	181 cm (5 ft 11 in)	71 kg (157 lb)	316 cm (10 ft 4 in)	310 cm (10 ft 2 in)
18	Fan Linlin	1 December 1991	190 cm (6 ft 3 in)	77 kg (170 lb)	316 cm (10 ft 4 in)	301 cm (9 ft 11 in)

== Dominican Republic ==
The following is the Dominican Republic roster in the 2011 FIVB World Cup.

#	Name	Date of birth	Height	Weight	Spike	Block
2	Rossy Dahiana Burgos Herrera	7 April 1985	184 cm (6 ft 0 in)	70 kg (150 lb)	305 cm (10 ft 0 in)	300 cm (9 ft 10 in)
3	Lisvel Elisa Eve Mejia	10 September 1991	194 cm (6 ft 4 in)	70 kg (150 lb)	325 cm (10 ft 8 in)	315 cm (10 ft 4 in)
5	Brenda Castillo	5 June 1992	167 cm (5 ft 6 in)	55 kg (121 lb)	245 cm (8 ft 0 in)	230 cm (7 ft 7 in)
6	Carmen Rosa Caso Sierra	29 November 1981	168 cm (5 ft 6 in)	59 kg (130 lb)	240 cm (7 ft 10 in)	230 cm (7 ft 7 in)
7	Niverka Dharlenis Marte Frica	19 October 1990	178 cm (5 ft 10 in)	71 kg (157 lb)	295 cm (9 ft 8 in)	283 cm (9 ft 3 in)
8	Candida Estefany Arias Perez	11 March 1992	194 cm (6 ft 4 in)	68 kg (150 lb)	320 cm (10 ft 6 in)	315 cm (10 ft 4 in)
10	Milagros Cabral De La Cruz	17 October 1978	182 cm (6 ft 0 in)	63 kg (139 lb)	325 cm (10 ft 8 in)	320 cm (10 ft 6 in)
11	Jeoselyna Rodriguez Santos	9 December 1991	187 cm (6 ft 2 in)	63 kg (139 lb)	325 cm (10 ft 8 in)	315 cm (10 ft 4 in)
12	Karla Miguelina Echenique Medina	16 May 1986	180 cm (5 ft 11 in)	65 kg (143 lb)	300 cm (9 ft 10 in)	290 cm (9 ft 6 in)
13	Cindy Carolina Rondon Martinez	12 November 1987	186 cm (6 ft 1 in)	61 kg (134 lb)	320 cm (10 ft 6 in)	315 cm (10 ft 4 in)
14	Prisilla Altagracia Rivera Brens	29 December 1984	183 cm (6 ft 0 in)	70 kg (150 lb)	320 cm (10 ft 6 in)	315 cm (10 ft 4 in)
18	Bethania De La Cruz De Peña	13 May 1987	184 cm (6 ft 0 in)	70 kg (150 lb)	330 cm (10 ft 10 in)	320 cm (10 ft 6 in)
19	Ana Yorkira Binet Stephens	9 February 1992	174 cm (5 ft 9 in)	58 kg (128 lb)	280 cm (9 ft 2 in)	260 cm (8 ft 6 in)
20	Brayelin Elizabeth Martinez	11 September 1996	199 cm (6 ft 6 in)	83 kg (183 lb)	330 cm (10 ft 10 in)	320 cm (10 ft 6 in)

== Germany ==
The following is the Germany roster in the 2011 FIVB World Cup.

#	Name	Date of birth	Height	Weight	Spike	Block
1	Lenka Dürr	10 December 1990	171 cm (5 ft 7 in)	59 kg (130 lb)	280 cm (9 ft 2 in)	270 cm (8 ft 10 in)
2	Kathleen Weiß	2 February 1984	171 cm (5 ft 7 in)	66 kg (146 lb)	290 cm (9 ft 6 in)	273 cm (8 ft 11 in)
4	Kerstin Tzscherlich	15 February 1978	179 cm (5 ft 10 in)	72 kg (159 lb)	295 cm (9 ft 8 in)	282 cm (9 ft 3 in)
7	Angelina Hübner-Grün	2 December 1979	185 cm (6 ft 1 in)	74 kg (163 lb)	309 cm (10 ft 2 in)	287 cm (9 ft 5 in)
8	Berit Kauffeldt	8 July 1990	190 cm (6 ft 3 in)	75 kg (165 lb)	311 cm (10 ft 2 in)	294 cm (9 ft 8 in)
9	Corina Ssuschke-Voigt	9 May 1983	189 cm (6 ft 2 in)	75 kg (165 lb)	310 cm (10 ft 2 in)	298 cm (9 ft 9 in)
10	Anne Matthes	30 April 1985	182 cm (6 ft 0 in)	66 kg (146 lb)	312 cm (10 ft 3 in)	295 cm (9 ft 8 in)
11	Christiane Fürst	29 March 1985	193 cm (6 ft 4 in)	80 kg (180 lb)	323 cm (10 ft 7 in)	307 cm (10 ft 1 in)
13	Saskia Hippe	16 January 1991	185 cm (6 ft 1 in)	67 kg (148 lb)	315 cm (10 ft 4 in)	292 cm (9 ft 7 in)
14	Margareta Kozuch	30 October 1986	187 cm (6 ft 2 in)	70 kg (150 lb)	309 cm (10 ft 2 in)	297 cm (9 ft 9 in)
15	Maren Brinker	10 July 1986	184 cm (6 ft 0 in)	68 kg (150 lb)	303 cm (9 ft 11 in)	295 cm (9 ft 8 in)
16	Lisa Thomsen	20 August 1985	172 cm (5 ft 8 in)	68 kg (150 lb)	290 cm (9 ft 6 in)	285 cm (9 ft 4 in)
19	Regina Burchardt	1 July 1983	186 cm (6 ft 1 in)	77 kg (170 lb)	302 cm (9 ft 11 in)	294 cm (9 ft 8 in)
20	Mareen Apitz	26 March 1987	183 cm (6 ft 0 in)	73 kg (161 lb)	295 cm (9 ft 8 in)	284 cm (9 ft 4 in)

== Italy ==
The following is the Italy roster in the 2011 FIVB World Cup.

#	Name	Date of birth	Height	Weight	Spike	Block
1	Sara Anzanello	30 July 1980	193 cm (6 ft 4 in)	78 kg (172 lb)	316 cm (10 ft 4 in)	298 cm (9 ft 9 in)
2	Cristina Barcellini	20 November 1986	183 cm (6 ft 0 in)	78 kg (172 lb)	307 cm (10 ft 1 in)	292 cm (9 ft 7 in)
3	Paola Croce	6 March 1978	167 cm (5 ft 6 in)	52 kg (115 lb)	290 cm (9 ft 6 in)	265 cm (8 ft 8 in)
6	Monica De Gennaro	8 January 1987	174 cm (5 ft 9 in)	67 kg (148 lb)	292 cm (9 ft 7 in)	270 cm (8 ft 10 in)
8	Carolina Del Pilar Costagrande	15 October 1980	188 cm (6 ft 2 in)	80 kg (180 lb)	312 cm (10 ft 3 in)	291 cm (9 ft 7 in)
9	Caterina Bosetti	2 February 1994	179 cm (5 ft 10 in)	59 kg (130 lb)	299 cm (9 ft 10 in)	281 cm (9 ft 3 in)
10	Immacolata Sirressi	19 May 1990	175 cm (5 ft 9 in)	62 kg (137 lb)	284 cm (9 ft 4 in)	260 cm (8 ft 6 in)
13	Valentina Arrighetti	26 January 1985	185 cm (6 ft 1 in)	72 kg (159 lb)	318 cm (10 ft 5 in)	310 cm (10 ft 2 in)
14	Eleonora Lo Bianco	22 December 1979	171 cm (5 ft 7 in)	67 kg (148 lb)	287 cm (9 ft 5 in)	273 cm (8 ft 11 in)
15	Antonella Del Core	5 November 1980	180 cm (5 ft 11 in)	70 kg (150 lb)	296 cm (9 ft 9 in)	279 cm (9 ft 2 in)
16	Lucia Bosetti	9 July 1989	175 cm (5 ft 9 in)	65 kg (143 lb)	316 cm (10 ft 4 in)	286 cm (9 ft 5 in)
17	Simona Gioli	17 September 1977	185 cm (6 ft 1 in)	70 kg (150 lb)	307 cm (10 ft 1 in)	283 cm (9 ft 3 in)
18	Noemi Signorile	15 February 1990	182 cm (6 ft 0 in)	70 kg (150 lb)	294 cm (9 ft 8 in)	290 cm (9 ft 6 in)
19	Raphaela Folie	7 March 1991	186 cm (6 ft 1 in)	82 kg (181 lb)	307 cm (10 ft 1 in)	283 cm (9 ft 3 in)

== Japan ==
The following is the Japan roster in the 2011 FIVB World Cup.

#	Name	Date of birth	Height	Weight	Spike	Block
2	Hitomi Nakamichi	18 September 1985	159 cm (5 ft 3 in)	53 kg (117 lb)	270 cm (8 ft 10 in)	256 cm (8 ft 5 in)
3	Yoshie Takeshita	18 March 1978	159 cm (5 ft 3 in)	53 kg (117 lb)	280 cm (9 ft 2 in)	270 cm (8 ft 10 in)
6	Yuko Sano	26 July 1979	159 cm (5 ft 3 in)	54 kg (119 lb)	260 cm (8 ft 6 in)	250 cm (8 ft 2 in)
7	Mai Yamaguchi	3 July 1983	176 cm (5 ft 9 in)	62 kg (137 lb)	304 cm (10 ft 0 in)	292 cm (9 ft 7 in)
8	Kotoki Zayasu	11 January 1990	159 cm (5 ft 3 in)	57 kg (126 lb)	270 cm (8 ft 10 in)	255 cm (8 ft 4 in)
9	Mizuho Ishida	22 January 1988	174 cm (5 ft 9 in)	65 kg (143 lb)	301 cm (9 ft 11 in)	286 cm (9 ft 5 in)
10	Nana Iwasaka	3 July 1990	187 cm (6 ft 2 in)	72 kg (159 lb)	300 cm (9 ft 10 in)	285 cm (9 ft 4 in)
11	Erika Araki	3 August 1984	186 cm (6 ft 1 in)	78 kg (172 lb)	307 cm (10 ft 1 in)	295 cm (9 ft 8 in)
12	Saori Kimura	19 August 1986	185 cm (6 ft 1 in)	65 kg (143 lb)	304 cm (10 ft 0 in)	293 cm (9 ft 7 in)
13	Risa Shinnabe	11 July 1990	173 cm (5 ft 8 in)	66 kg (146 lb)	295 cm (9 ft 8 in)	268 cm (8 ft 10 in)
14	Yukiko Ebata	7 November 1989	176 cm (5 ft 9 in)	67 kg (148 lb)	305 cm (10 ft 0 in)	298 cm (9 ft 9 in)
15	Maiko Kano	15 July 1988	185 cm (6 ft 1 in)	72 kg (159 lb)	303 cm (9 ft 11 in)	285 cm (9 ft 4 in)
16	Saori Sakoda	18 December 1987	175 cm (5 ft 9 in)	63 kg (139 lb)	305 cm (10 ft 0 in)	279 cm (9 ft 2 in)
18	Kazuyo Mori	21 June 1976	175 cm (5 ft 9 in)	64 kg (141 lb)	303 cm (9 ft 11 in)	291 cm (9 ft 7 in)

== Kenya ==
The following is the Kenya roster in the 2011 FIVB World Cup.

#	Name	Date of birth	Height	Weight	Spike	Block
2	Everlyne Makuto	25 August 1990	181 cm (5 ft 11 in)	64 kg (141 lb)	328 cm (10 ft 9 in)	308 cm (10 ft 1 in)
4	Esther Wangeci	22 November 1990	180 cm (5 ft 11 in)	73 kg (161 lb)	302 cm (9 ft 11 in)	296 cm (9 ft 9 in)
5	Diana Khisa	26 May 1987	180 cm (5 ft 11 in)	72 kg (159 lb)	305 cm (10 ft 0 in)	300 cm (9 ft 10 in)
6	Ruth Jepngetich	9 April 1990	186 cm (6 ft 1 in)	74 kg (163 lb)	194 cm (6 ft 4 in)	199 cm (6 ft 6 in)
7	Jannet Wanja	24 February 1984	175 cm (5 ft 9 in)	59 kg (130 lb)	299 cm (9 ft 10 in)	287 cm (9 ft 5 in)
9	Roseline Odhiambo	11 March 1981	179 cm (5 ft 10 in)	71 kg (157 lb)	280 cm (9 ft 2 in)	264 cm (8 ft 8 in)
10	Noel Murambi	29 January 1989	178 cm (5 ft 10 in)	68 kg (150 lb)	190 cm (6 ft 3 in)	194 cm (6 ft 4 in)
12	Lydia Maiyo	3 November 1988	185 cm (6 ft 1 in)	75 kg (165 lb)	325 cm (10 ft 8 in)	315 cm (10 ft 4 in)
14	Mercy Moim	1 January 1989	183 cm (6 ft 0 in)	72 kg (159 lb)	320 cm (10 ft 6 in)	308 cm (10 ft 1 in)
15	Brackcides Khadambi	14 May 1984	180 cm (5 ft 11 in)	70 kg (150 lb)	310 cm (10 ft 2 in)	306 cm (10 ft 0 in)
16	Judith Tarus	26 June 1986	170 cm (5 ft 7 in)	60 kg (130 lb)	260 cm (8 ft 6 in)	256 cm (8 ft 5 in)
20	Florence Bosire	26 September 1988	175 cm (5 ft 9 in)	60 kg (130 lb)	270 cm (8 ft 10 in)	255 cm (8 ft 4 in)

== Serbia ==
The following is the Serbia roster in the 2011 FIVB World Cup.

#	Name	Date of birth	Height	Weight	Spike	Block
2	Jovana Brakocevic	5 March 1988	196 cm (6 ft 5 in)	82 kg (181 lb)	309 cm (10 ft 2 in)	295 cm (9 ft 8 in)
3	Sanja Malagurski	8 June 1990	192 cm (6 ft 4 in)	74 kg (163 lb)	305 cm (10 ft 0 in)	295 cm (9 ft 8 in)
4	Bojana Zivkovic	29 March 1988	186 cm (6 ft 1 in)	72 kg (159 lb)	292 cm (9 ft 7 in)	284 cm (9 ft 4 in)
5	Natasa Krsmanovic	19 June 1985	187 cm (6 ft 2 in)	73 kg (161 lb)	305 cm (10 ft 0 in)	285 cm (9 ft 4 in)
6	Tijana Malesevic	18 March 1991	184 cm (6 ft 0 in)	78 kg (172 lb)	300 cm (9 ft 10 in)	286 cm (9 ft 5 in)
7	Brizitka Molnar	28 July 1985	182 cm (6 ft 0 in)	69 kg (152 lb)	304 cm (10 ft 0 in)	290 cm (9 ft 6 in)
8	Ana Antonijevic	26 August 1987	185 cm (6 ft 1 in)	70 kg (150 lb)	295 cm (9 ft 8 in)	283 cm (9 ft 3 in)
9	Jovana Vesovic	21 June 1987	182 cm (6 ft 0 in)	68 kg (150 lb)	283 cm (9 ft 3 in)	268 cm (8 ft 10 in)
13	Ana Bjelica	3 April 1992	190 cm (6 ft 3 in)	78 kg (172 lb)	310 cm (10 ft 2 in)	305 cm (10 ft 0 in)
14	Nadja Ninkovic	1 November 1991	193 cm (6 ft 4 in)	77 kg (170 lb)	307 cm (10 ft 1 in)	298 cm (9 ft 9 in)
16	Milena Rasic	25 October 1990	192 cm (6 ft 4 in)	72 kg (159 lb)	303 cm (9 ft 11 in)	293 cm (9 ft 7 in)
17	Stefana Veljkovic	9 January 1990	190 cm (6 ft 3 in)	76 kg (168 lb)	320 cm (10 ft 6 in)	305 cm (10 ft 0 in)
18	Suzana Cebic	9 November 1984	167 cm (5 ft 6 in)	60 kg (130 lb)	279 cm (9 ft 2 in)	255 cm (8 ft 4 in)
19	Silvija Popovic	15 March 1986	178 cm (5 ft 10 in)	65 kg (143 lb)	276 cm (9 ft 1 in)	266 cm (8 ft 9 in)

== South Korea ==
The following is the South Korea roster in the 2011 FIVB World Cup.

#	Name	Date of birth	Height	Weight	Spike	Block
1	Kim Min-Ji	25 May 1985	187 cm (6 ft 2 in)	75 kg (165 lb)	304 cm (10 ft 0 in)	296 cm (9 ft 9 in)
3	Jung Ji-Youn	28 June 1980	178 cm (5 ft 10 in)	64 kg (141 lb)	295 cm (9 ft 8 in)	284 cm (9 ft 4 in)
4	Hwang Youn-Joo	13 August 1986	177 cm (5 ft 10 in)	68 kg (150 lb)	303 cm (9 ft 11 in)	294 cm (9 ft 8 in)
6	Choi Youn-Ok	23 April 1985	173 cm (5 ft 8 in)	59 kg (130 lb)	290 cm (9 ft 6 in)	280 cm (9 ft 2 in)
7	Yoon Hye-Suk	19 June 1983	174 cm (5 ft 9 in)	60 kg (130 lb)	293 cm (9 ft 7 in)	283 cm (9 ft 3 in)
8	Nam Jie-Youn	25 May 1983	172 cm (5 ft 8 in)	63 kg (139 lb)	285 cm (9 ft 4 in)	273 cm (8 ft 11 in)
10	Kim Yeon-Koung	26 February 1988	192 cm (6 ft 4 in)	73 kg (161 lb)	307 cm (10 ft 1 in)	299 cm (9 ft 10 in)
13	Lee Bo-Lam	8 August 1988	185 cm (6 ft 1 in)	75 kg (165 lb)	283 cm (9 ft 3 in)	274 cm (9 ft 0 in)
14	Joo Yea-Na	2 May 1990	175 cm (5 ft 9 in)	61 kg (134 lb)	289 cm (9 ft 6 in)	280 cm (9 ft 2 in)
15	Kim Se-Young	4 June 1981	190 cm (6 ft 3 in)	73 kg (161 lb)	309 cm (10 ft 2 in)	300 cm (9 ft 10 in)
16	Jang Young-Eun	30 October 1993	182 cm (6 ft 0 in)	68 kg (150 lb)	290 cm (9 ft 6 in)	270 cm (8 ft 10 in)
17	Kim Hye-Jin	17 February 1989	180 cm (5 ft 11 in)	62 kg (137 lb)	284 cm (9 ft 4 in)	274 cm (9 ft 0 in)
18	Kim Hee-Jin	29 April 1991	185 cm (6 ft 1 in)	77 kg (170 lb)	300 cm (9 ft 10 in)	295 cm (9 ft 8 in)
19	Park Jeong-Ah	26 March 1993	185 cm (6 ft 1 in)	68 kg (150 lb)	300 cm (9 ft 10 in)	290 cm (9 ft 6 in)

== United States ==
The following is the United States roster in the 2011 FIVB World Cup.

#	Name	Date of birth	Height	Weight	Spike	Block
1	Alisha Glass	5 April 1988	181 cm (5 ft 11 in)	72 kg (159 lb)	305 cm (10 ft 0 in)	300 cm (9 ft 10 in)
2	Danielle Scott-Arruda	1 October 1972	188 cm (6 ft 2 in)	84 kg (185 lb)	325 cm (10 ft 8 in)	302 cm (9 ft 11 in)
3	Tayyiba Haneef-Park	23 March 1979	200 cm (6 ft 7 in)	82 kg (181 lb)	328 cm (10 ft 9 in)	312 cm (10 ft 3 in)
4	Lindsey Berg	16 July 1980	173 cm (5 ft 8 in)	75 kg (165 lb)	287 cm (9 ft 5 in)	274 cm (9 ft 0 in)
6	Nicole Davis	24 April 1982	167 cm (5 ft 6 in)	73 kg (161 lb)	284 cm (9 ft 4 in)	266 cm (8 ft 9 in)
7	Heather Bown	29 November 1978	188 cm (6 ft 2 in)	90 kg (200 lb)	301 cm (9 ft 11 in)	290 cm (9 ft 6 in)
8	Cynthia Barboza	7 February 1987	183 cm (6 ft 0 in)	68 kg (150 lb)	311 cm (10 ft 2 in)	301 cm (9 ft 11 in)
9	Jennifer Tamas	23 November 1982	191 cm (6 ft 3 in)	82 kg (181 lb)	315 cm (10 ft 4 in)	301 cm (9 ft 11 in)
11	Jordan Larson-Burbach	16 October 1986	187 cm (6 ft 2 in)	75 kg (165 lb)	302 cm (9 ft 11 in)	295 cm (9 ft 8 in)
12	Destinee Hooker	7 September 1987	191 cm (6 ft 3 in)	73 kg (161 lb)	314 cm (10 ft 4 in)	292 cm (9 ft 7 in)
14	Tamari Miyashiro	8 July 1987	170 cm (5 ft 7 in)	70 kg (150 lb)	284 cm (9 ft 4 in)	266 cm (8 ft 9 in)
15	Logan Tom	25 May 1981	184 cm (6 ft 0 in)	80 kg (180 lb)	306 cm (10 ft 0 in)	297 cm (9 ft 9 in)
16	Foluke Akinradewo	5 October 1987	188 cm (6 ft 2 in)	79 kg (174 lb)	331 cm (10 ft 10 in)	300 cm (9 ft 10 in)
18	Megan Easy	15 October 1988	187 cm (6 ft 2 in)	80 kg (180 lb)	320 cm (10 ft 6 in)	297 cm (9 ft 9 in)

== See also ==
- 2011 FIVB Volleyball Men's World Cup squads
