= Algeria at the 2012 Summer Olympics =

- IOC code: ALG
- NOC: Algerian Olympic Committee
- Website: www.coa.dz

in London
- Competitors: 39 in 12 sports
- Flag bearers: Abdelhafid Benchabla (opening); Taoufik Makhloufi (closing)
- Medals Ranked 50th: Gold 1 Silver 0 Bronze 0 Total 1

Summer Olympics appearances (overview)
- 1964; 1968; 1972; 1976; 1980; 1984; 1988; 1992; 1996; 2000; 2004; 2008; 2012; 2016; 2020; 2024

Other related appearances
- France (1896–1960)

Algeria competed at the 2012 Summer Olympics in London, United Kingdom, from 27 July to 12 August 2012. This was the nation's twelfth consecutive appearance at the Summer Olympics, except for the 1976 Summer Olympics in Montreal because of the African boycott.

The Algerian Olympic Committee sent a total of 39 athletes to the Games, 21 men and 18 women, to compete in 12 sports. Women's volleyball was the only team event in which Algeria had its representation in these Olympic Games. There was only a single competitor in road cycling, rowing, sailing, shooting, swimming, and weightlifting. Boxing was the largest team by an individual-based sport, with a total of eight competitors.

The Algerian team included judoka Soraya Haddad, who previously won the bronze medal in Beijing, and sabre fencer Lea Moutoussamy, who set the nation's record as the youngest athlete, at age 14, in its Olympic history. Light heavyweight boxer and 2011 World Series champion Abdelhafid Benchabla was the nation's flag bearer at the opening ceremony.

Algeria left London with its first Olympic gold medal since 2000 from middle-distance runner Taoufik Makhloufi.

== Medalists ==
Medal	Name	Sport	Event	Date
Gold	Taoufik Makhloufi	Athletics	Men's 1500 m	7 August

Medals by sport
Sport	1st place, gold medalist(s)	2nd place, silver medalist(s)	3rd place, bronze medalist(s)	Total
Athletics	1	0	0	1
Total	1	0	0	1

== Competitors ==
Sport	Men	Women	Total
Athletics	5	1	6
Boxing	8	0	8
Cycling	1	0	1
Fencing	0	2	2
Judo	0	2	2
Rowing	0	1	1
Shooting	1	0	1
Swimming	1	0	1
Taekwondo	1	0	1
Volleyball	0	12	12
Weightlifting	1	0	1
Wrestling	3	0	3
Total	21	18	39

== Athletics ==
Algerian athletes have achieved qualifying standards in the following athletics events (up to a maximum of 3 athletes in each event at the 'A' Standard, and 1 at the 'B' Standard):

Key

- Note – Ranks given for track events are within the athlete's heat only
- Q = Qualified for the next round
- q = Qualified for the next round as a fastest loser or, in field events, by position without achieving the qualifying target
- NR = National record
- N/A = Round not applicable for the event
- Bye = Athlete not required to compete in round

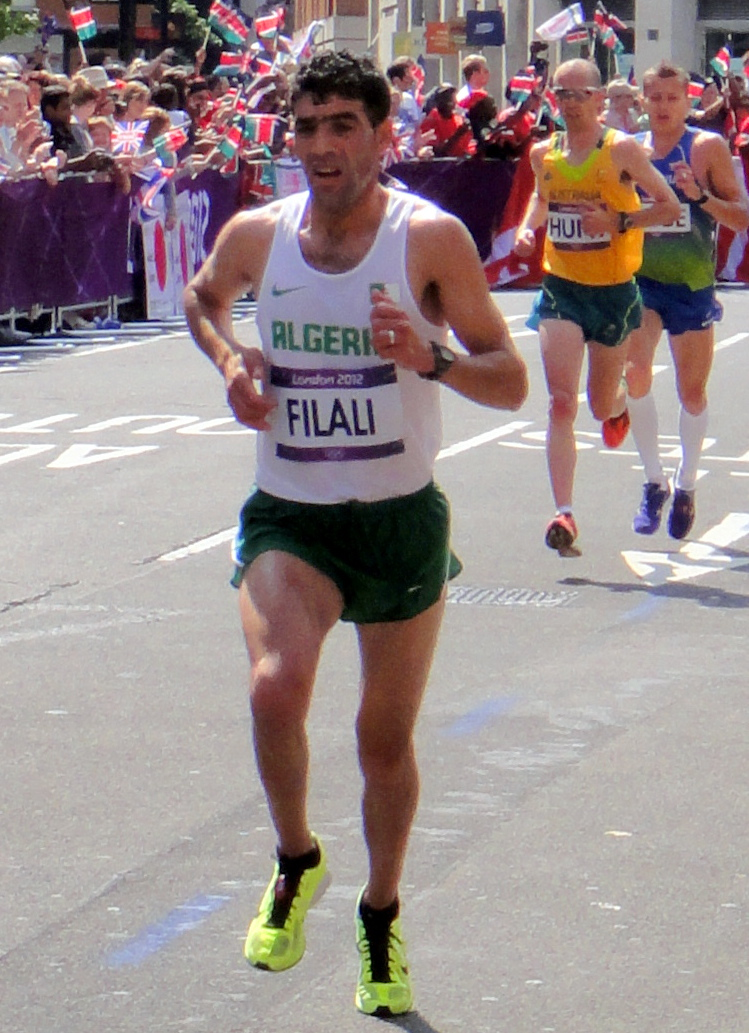
Tayeb Filali failed to finish the men's marathon.

Men
Track & road events

Athlete	Event	Heat		Semifinal		Final	
Athlete	Event	Result	Rank	Result	Rank	Result	Rank
Rabah Aboud	5000 m	13:28.38	14	—N/a		did not advance	
Mohamed Belabbas	3000 m steeplechase	8:22.32	6	—N/a		did not advance	
Tayeb Filali	Marathon	—N/a				DNF	
Taoufik Makhloufi	800 m	DNF		did not advance			
Taoufik Makhloufi	1500 m	3:35.15	1 Q	3:42.25	1 Q	3:34.08	1st place, gold medalist(s)

Field events

Athlete	Event	Qualification		Final	
Athlete	Event	Distance	Position	Distance	Position
Issam Nima	Triple jump	16.50	15	did not advance	

Women
Track & road events

Athlete	Event	Final	
Athlete	Event	Result	Rank
Souad Ait Salem	Marathon	2:31:15	37

== Boxing ==
Algeria has qualified 2 boxers. Abdelhafid Benchabla has qualified for the Games by winning the light heavyweight 80–85 kg division at the World Series of Boxing finals. Mohamed Amine Ouadahi qualified from the 2011 World Amateur Boxing Championships. Algeria also qualified boxers from the African Continental Tournament.

Men

Athlete	Event	Round of 32	Round of 16	Quarterfinals	Semifinals	Final	
Athlete	Event	Opposition Result	Opposition Result	Opposition Result	Opposition Result	Opposition Result	Rank
Mohamed Flissi	Light flyweight	Pongprayoon (THA); L 11–19	did not advance				
Samir Brahimi	Flyweight	Woods (AUS); W 14–12	Aloyan (RUS); L 9–14	did not advance			
Mohamed Amine Ouadahi	Bantamweight	Turkadze (GEO); W WO	Encarnación (DOM); W 16–10	Shimizu (JPN); L 15–17	did not advance		
Abdelkader Chadi	Lightweight	Keleş (TUR); L 8–15	did not advance				
Ilyas Abbadi	Welterweight	Evans (GBR); L 10–18	did not advance				
Abdelmalek Rahou	Middleweight	Ross (AUS); W 13–11	Murata (JPN); L 12–21	did not advance			
Abdelhafid Benchabla	Light heavyweight	Bye	Kölling (GER); W 12–9	Hvozdyk (UKR); L 17–19	did not advance		
Chouaib Bouloudinats	Heavyweight	—N/a	Peralta (ARG); L 5–13	did not advance			

== Cycling ==
=== Road ===
Algeria has qualified one rider.

Athlete	Event	Time	Rank
Azzedine Lagab	Men's road race	did not finish	

== Fencing ==
Algeria has qualified 2 fencers.

Women

Athlete	Event	Round of 64	Round of 32	Round of 16	Quarterfinals	Semifinals	Final / BM	
Athlete	Event	Opposition Score	Opposition Score	Opposition Score	Opposition Score	Opposition Score	Opposition Score	Rank
Anissa Khelfaoui	Individual foil	Leleyko (UKR); L 4–15	did not advance					
Lea Moutoussamy	Individual sabre	—N/a	Velikaya (RUS); L 6–15	did not advance				

== Judo ==
Athlete	Event	Round of 32	Round of 16	Quarterfinals	Semifinals	Repechage	Final / BM	
Athlete	Event	Opposition Result	Opposition Result	Opposition Result	Opposition Result	Opposition Result	Opposition Result	Rank
Soraya Haddad	Women's −52 kg	Chițu (ROU); L 0000–0100	did not advance					
Sonia Asselah	Women's +78 kg	Bryant (GBR); L 0001–0100	did not advance					

== Rowing ==
Algeria has qualified the following boat.

Women

Athlete	Event	Heats		Repechage		Quarterfinals		Semifinals		Final	
Athlete	Event	Time	Rank	Time	Rank	Time	Rank	Time	Rank	Time	Rank
Amina Rouba	Single sculls	8:15.94	5 R	8:12.83	4 FE	Bye				8:42.23	26

Qualification Legend: FA=Final A (medal); FB=Final B (non-medal); FC=Final C (non-medal); FD=Final D (non-medal); FE=Final E (non-medal); FF=Final F (non-medal); SA/B=Semifinals A/B; SC/D=Semifinals C/D; SE/F=Semifinals E/F; QF=Quarterfinals; R=Repechage

== Shooting ==
Men

Athlete	Event	Qualification		Final	
Athlete	Event	Points	Rank	Points	Rank
Fateh Ziadi	10 m air pistol	562	43	did not advance	

== Swimming ==
Algerian swimmers have achieved qualifying standards in the following events (up to a maximum of 2 swimmers in each event at the Olympic Qualifying Time (OQT), and 1 at the Olympic Selection Time (OST)):

Men

Athlete	Event	Heat		Semifinal		Final	
Athlete	Event	Time	Rank	Time	Rank	Time	Rank
Nabil Kebbab	100 m freestyle	50.37	33	did not advance			

== Taekwondo ==
Algeria has qualified 1 athlete.

Athlete	Event	Round of 16	Quarterfinals	Semifinals	Repechage	Bronze Medal	Final	
Athlete	Event	Opposition Result	Opposition Result	Opposition Result	Opposition Result	Opposition Result	Opposition Result	Rank
Mokdad El-Yamine	Men's −58 kg	Muñoz (COL); L 1–8	did not advance					

== Volleyball ==
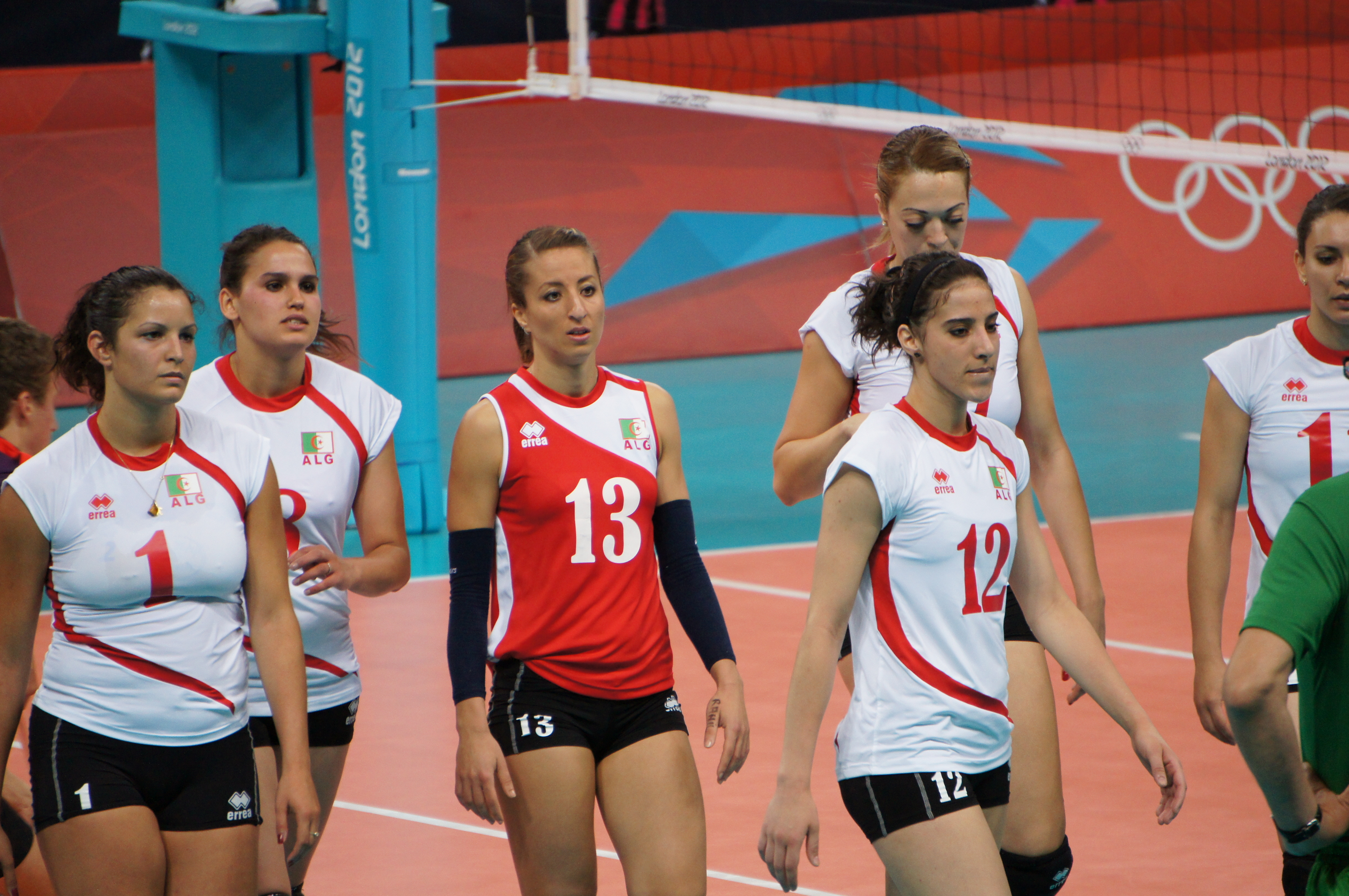
Algeria women's national volleyball team at the 2012 Summer Olympics

Algeria's women's team qualified for the indoor tournament.

- Women's team event – 1 team of 12 players

=== Women's indoor tournament ===
Team roster

The following is the Algerian roster in the women's volleyball tournament of the 2012 Summer Olympics.

Head coach: (Poland) George Strumilo

№	Name	Date of birth	Height	Weight	Spike	Block	2012 club
1	Sehryne Hennaoui	1 October 1988	1.72 m (5 ft 8 in)	69 kg (152 lb)	285 cm (112 in)	273 cm (107 in)	(France) Le Hainaut VB Women
2	Dallal Merwa Achour	3 November 1994	1.75 m (5 ft 9 in)	60 kg (130 lb)	279 cm (110 in)	273 cm (107 in)	(Algeria) ESF Mouzaia
3	Salima Hammouche (L)	17 January 1984	1.58 m (5 ft 2 in)	54 kg (119 lb)	270 cm (110 in)	265 cm (104 in)	(Algeria) GS Pétroliers
5	Amel Khamtache	4 May 1981	1.81 m (5 ft 11 in)	65 kg (143 lb)	240 cm (94 in)	235 cm (93 in)	(Algeria) GS Pétroliers
8	Zohra Bensalem	5 April 1990	1.78 m (5 ft 10 in)	68 kg (150 lb)	310 cm (120 in)	299 cm (118 in)	(Algeria) GS Pétroliers
9	Sarra Belhocine	18 September 1994	1.76 m (5 ft 9 in)	58 kg (128 lb)	272 cm (107 in)	266 cm (105 in)	(Algeria) GS Pétroliers
11	Mouni Abderrahim	19 November 1985	1.71 m (5 ft 7 in)	60 kg (130 lb)	305 cm (120 in)	293 cm (115 in)	(Algeria) ASW Bejaïa
12	Safia Boukhima	10 January 1991	1.76 m (5 ft 9 in)	64 kg (141 lb)	294 cm (116 in)	284 cm (112 in)	(Algeria) GS Pétroliers
13	Nawal Mansouri (L)	1 August 1985	1.74 m (5 ft 9 in)	64 kg (141 lb)	291 cm (115 in)	281 cm (111 in)	(Algeria) GS Pétroliers
17	Lydia Oulmou (c)	2 February 1986	1.86 m (6 ft 1 in)	74 kg (163 lb)	310 cm (120 in)	305 cm (120 in)	(France) Istres Volleyball
18	Tassadit Aïssou	19 June 1989	1.84 m (6 ft 0 in)	80 kg (180 lb)	295 cm (116 in)	285 cm (112 in)	(Algeria) Nedjmet Chlef
19	Celia Bourihane	22 January 1995	1.77 m (5 ft 10 in)	60 kg (130 lb)	295 cm (116 in)	289 cm (114 in)	(Algeria) NC Bejaïa

Group play

Pos	Team	Pld	W	L	Pts	SW	SL	SR	SPW	SPL	SPR	Qualification
1	Russia	5	5	0	14	15	4	3.750	459	352	1.304	Quarter-finals
2	Italy	5	4	1	13	14	5	2.800	442	368	1.201	Quarter-finals
3	Japan	5	3	2	9	11	6	1.833	401	335	1.197	Quarter-finals
4	Dominican Republic	5	2	3	6	8	9	0.889	374	362	1.033	Quarter-finals
5	Great Britain	5	1	4	2	3	14	0.214	295	396	0.745	
6	Algeria	5	0	5	1	2	15	0.133	252	410	0.615	

28 July 2012; 09:30	Algeria	0–3	Japan	Earls Court Exhibition Centre, London; Attendance: 13,000; Referees: Karin Zahorcova (CZE), José Vélez (PUR)
28 July 2012; 09:30	(15–25, 14–25, 7–25) result statistics			Earls Court Exhibition Centre, London; Attendance: 13,000; Referees: Karin Zahorcova (CZE), José Vélez (PUR)

30 July 2012; 22:00	Great Britain	3–2	Algeria	Earls Court Exhibition Centre, London; Attendance: 14,000; Referees: Mitchell Davidson (CAN), Janpen Jirakakul (THA)
30 July 2012; 22:00	(22–25, 25–19, 23–25, 25–19, 15–8) result statistics			Earls Court Exhibition Centre, London; Attendance: 14,000; Referees: Mitchell Davidson (CAN), Janpen Jirakakul (THA)

1 August 2012; 11:30	Algeria	0–3	Russia	Earls Court Exhibition Centre, London; Attendance: 9,000; Referees: Janpen Jirakakul (THA), Brian McDougall (GBR)
1 August 2012; 11:30	(7–25, 14–25, 15–25) result statistics			Earls Court Exhibition Centre, London; Attendance: 9,000; Referees: Janpen Jirakakul (THA), Brian McDougall (GBR)

3 August 2012; 22:00	Algeria	0–3	Italy	Earls Court Exhibition Centre, London; Attendance: 11,000; Referees: Patricia Salvatore (USA), Wang Ning (CHN)
3 August 2012; 22:00	(11–25, 12–25, 17–25) result statistics			Earls Court Exhibition Centre, London; Attendance: 11,000; Referees: Patricia Salvatore (USA), Wang Ning (CHN)

5 August 2012; 09:30	Algeria	0–3	Dominican Republic	Earls Court Exhibition Centre, London; Attendance: 11,000; Referees: Patricia Salvatore (USA), Brian McDougall (GBR)
5 August 2012; 09:30	(15–25, 16–25, 13–25) result statistics			Earls Court Exhibition Centre, London; Attendance: 11,000; Referees: Patricia Salvatore (USA), Brian McDougall (GBR)

== Weightlifting ==
Algeria has qualified the following quota places.

Athlete	Event	Snatch		Clean & Jerk		Total	Rank
Athlete	Event	Result	Rank	Result	Rank	Total	Rank
Walid Bidani	Men's −105 kg	160	14	180	14	340	14

== Wrestling ==
Algeria has qualified three quota places.

Key:

- VT – Victory by Fall.
- PP – Decision by Points – the loser with technical points.
- PO – Decision by Points – the loser without technical points.

Men's freestyle

Athlete	Event	Qualification	Round of 16	Quarterfinal	Semifinal	Repechage 1	Repechage 2	Final / BM	
Athlete	Event	Opposition Result	Opposition Result	Opposition Result	Opposition Result	Opposition Result	Opposition Result	Opposition Result	Rank
Mohamed Louafi	−84 kg	Bye	Gattsiev (BLR); L 1–3 ^{PP}	did not advance					16

Men's Greco-Roman

Athlete	Event	Qualification	Round of 16	Quarterfinal	Semifinal	Repechage 1	Repechage 2	Final / BM	
Athlete	Event	Opposition Result	Opposition Result	Opposition Result	Opposition Result	Opposition Result	Opposition Result	Opposition Result	Rank
Tarek Benaissa	−60 kg	Bye	Kuramagomedov (RUS); L 0–3 ^{PO}	did not advance					15
Mohamed Serir	−66 kg	Venckaitis (LTU); L 1–3 ^{PP}	did not advance						13

== See also ==
- Algeria at the 2012 Summer Paralympics
