= Volleyball at the 2009 Mediterranean Games – Women's team rosters =

This article shows the rosters of all participating teams at the women's indoor volleyball tournament at the 2009 Mediterranean Games in Pescara.

== Albania ==
No.	Name	Date of birth	Position	Club
-	Hasan Gurabardhi		coach	
1	Amarilda Prenga	18 July 1981	outside hitter	(Finland) Laihian Lujattaret
6	Iva XhiXha	23 December 1988	outside hitter	(Albania) UMB Volej
7	Kleda Shkurti	23 February 1986		(Albania) Volejbol Tirana
8	Sindi Mizaku	12 November 1988	setter	(Albania) KS Skënderbeu Coriza
9	Narisa Kuqi	10 January 1984	setter	(Albania) UMB Volej
10	Klonarda Nezaj	20 June 1988	middle blocker	(Albania) Volejbol Tirana
11	Ariola Prenga	9 May 1986		(Albania) UMB Volej
12	Rubena Sukaj	8 July 1987		(Albania) Volejbol Tirana
13	Esmeralda Tuci	7 March 1986	middle blocker	(Albania) KS Studenti Tirana
15	Enkeleda Braho	23 January 1992	outside hitter	(Albania) Partizani Tirana
16	Dorina Hjsenbelli	4 December 1986		
18	Xhozafa Sejfullai	29 April 1984	libero	(Albania) Volejbol Tirana

== Algeria ==
No.	Name	Date of birth	Position	Club
-	Mouloud Ikhedji		coach	
1	Sehryne Hennaoui	10 January 1988	setter	(France) Istres Volley-Ball
2	Yasmine Oudni	2 August 1989	outside hitter	(Algeria) GSP Algeri
3	Salima Hammouche	17 January 1984	libero	(Algeria) GSP Algeri
8	Zohra Bensalem	5 April 1990	outside hitter	(Algeria) ASW Béjaïa
9	Narimene Madani	12 March 1984	outside hitter	(Algeria) GSP Algeri
10	Fatma Zahra Oukazi	18 January 1984	setter	(Algeria) GSP Algeri
11	Mouni Abderrahim	19 November 1985	outside hitter	(Algeria) ASW Béjaïa
12	Safia Boukhima	10 January 1991	outside hitter	(Algeria) ASW Béjaïa
13	Nawal Mansouri	1 August 1985	libero	(Algeria) Nacéria Béjaïa
14	Faïza Tsabet	22 March 1985	outside hitter	(France) Istres Volley-Ball
17	Lydia Oulmou	2 February 1986	middle blocker	(France) La Rochette Volley
18	Tassadit Aissou	19 June 1989	outside hitter	(Algeria) ASW Béjaïa

== Bosnia and Herzegovina ==
No.	Name	Date of birth	Position	Club
-	Hamid Subasić		coach	
2	Amira Sirotanović	12 January 1985		(Bosnia and Herzegovina) OK Bihać
4	Aleksandra Vidović	29 October 1991		(Bosnia and Herzegovina) OK Kula Gradačac
5	Dijana Vasić	22 July 1983		(Bosnia and Herzegovina) Jedintsovo Brčko
6	Milica Hrnjez	17 August 1990		(Bosnia and Herzegovina) OK Bileća
8	Amela Hadzić	30 January 1987		
9	Natasa Slijepcević	22 December 1990		
10	Dragana Bartula	26 April 1988		(Serbia) ŽOK Klek
11	Olivera Petricević	19 July 1984		
12	Brankica Mihajlović	13 April 1991		(Bosnia and Herzegovina) Jedintsovo Brčko
13	Helena Kosutić	30 September 1993		
14	Sanja Kojic-Djurić	4 February 1991		
15	Erna Sinanović	27 September 1982	libero	(Bosnia and Herzegovina) OK Kula Gradačac

== Croatia ==
No.	Name	Date of birth	Position	Club
-	Mirosla Aksentijević		coach	
2	Ana Grbać	23 March 1988	setter	(Croatia) ŽOK Rijeka
3	Jelena Balić	4 July 1986		
4	Marina Miletić	21 February 1983	libero	(Croatia) ŽOK Rijeka
5	Mirela Delić	13 November 1981	middle blocker	
6	Sanja Popović	31 May 1984	outside hitter	(Italy) Chieri Volley
7	Cecilia Dujieć	6 December 1987		
8	Mia Jerkov	14 May 1986	opposite	(Italy) BV Nocera Umbra
9	Ilijana Dugandžić	17 April 1981	middle blocker	
10	Biljana Gligorović	31 January 1982	setter	(Greece) Olympiakos
12	Senna Ušić	14 May 1986	outside hitter	(Italy) Pallavolo Cesena
15	Ivana Miloš	7 March 1986	middle blocker	(Croatia) ŽOK Rijeka
18	Maja Poljak	2 May 1983	middle blocker	(Turkey) Türk Telekom Ankara

== France ==
No.	Name	Date of birth	Position	Club
-	Laurence Plasman	2 July 1970	coach	
1	Chloe Gaudel	11 December 1984	outside hitter	(France) Toulon Volley-Ball
2	Véronika Hudima	8 July 1988	outside hitter	(France) RC de Cannes
3	Aminata Coulibaly	27 September 1989	outside hitter	(France) ASPTT Mulhouse
5	Tetet Dembele	13 September 1989	middle blocker	(France) RC de Cannes
6	Laurianne Delabarre	24 April 1987	setter	(France) La Rochette Volley
7	Mallory Steux	24 October 1988	setter	(France) RC Villebon 91
8	Rouguy Coulibaly	26 February 1989	outside hitter	(France) RC de Cannes
9	Laura Ong	30 April 1989	libero	(France) RC de Cannes
10	Marielle Alteirac	2 July 1985	middle blocker	(France) Istres Volley-Ball
11	Anna Szerszen	24 November 1988	outside hitter	(United States) Ohio State University
12	Isaline Sager-Weider	5 July 1988	middle blocker	(France) ASPTT Mulhouse

== Greece ==
No.	Name	Date of birth	Position	Club
-	Georgios Lykoydis		coach	
1	Evangelia Kyriakidou	27 July 1981		(Greece) Iraklis Salonicco
2	Anna Karpouza	9 January 1990	setter	
4	Nikoletta Koutouxidou	10 January 1980	setter	(Greece) Panathinaikos
5	Niki Mouzaki	10 January 1990		
6	Eleni Kiosi	27 February 1985	outside hitter	(Greece) Iraklis Salonicco
7	Georgia Tzanakaki	1 December 1980	middle blocker	
8	Maria Chatzinikolaou	30 September 1978	middle blocker	(Greece) Olympiakos
9	Panagiota Gkiouzeli	17 March 1990		
10	Evangelia Christou	7 October 1987		
11	Sofia Drougka	28 January 1981	setter	(Greece) AO Markopoulo
12	Xanthi Mylona	27 May 1980	libero	(Greece) Panathinaikos
15	Evangelia Chantava	26 October 1990	outside hitter	(Greece) Iraklis Salonicco

== Italy ==
No.	Name	Date of birth	Position	Club
-	Massimo Barbolini	29 August 1964	coach	
2	Simona Rinieri	1 September 1977	outside hitter	(Italy) Pieralisi Jesi
3	Paola Croce	6 March 1978	libero	(Italy) River Piacenza
4	Monica Ravetta	29 August 1985	opposite	(Italy) FV Busto Arsizio
5	Giulia Rondon	16 October 1987	setter	(Italy) Sassuolo Volley
6	Francesca Marcon	9 July 1983	outside hitter	(Italy) Spes Conegliano
7	Martina Guiggi	1 May 1984	middle blocker	(Italy) Robursport Pesaro
8	Jenny Barazza	24 July 1981	middle blocker	(Italy) Volley Bergamo
9	Manuela Secolo	22 February 1977	outside hitter	(Greece) Olympiakos
12	Francesca Piccinini	10 January 1979	outside hitter	(Italy) Volley Bergamo
14	Eleonora Lo Bianco	22 December 1979	setter	(Italy) Volley Bergamo
17	Simona Gioli	17 September 1977	middle blocker	(Russia) Dinamo Mosca
18	Taismary Agüero	5 March 1977	opposite	(Turkey) Türk Telekom Ankara

== Turkey ==
No.	Name	Date of birth	Position	Club
-	Alessandro Chiappini	31 January 1969	coach	
1	Pelin Çelik	23 May 1982	setter	(Turkey) Karşıyaka Izmir
2	Gizem Güreşen	14 January 1987	libero	(Turkey) Galatasaray SK
3	Nihan Yeldan	7 February 1982	libero	(Turkey) VakıfGüneş Istanbul
5	Gökçen Denkel	2 August 1985	middle blocker	(Turkey) Eczacıbaşı Istanbul
8	Bahar Toksoy	6 February 1988	middle blocker	(Turkey) VakıfGüneş Istanbul
9	Deniz Hakyemez	3 February 1983	outside hitter	(Turkey) VakıfGüneş Istanbul
10	Özge Kırdar	26 June 1985	setter	(Turkey) İller Bankası Ankara
11	Naz Aydemir	14 August 1990	setter	(Turkey) Eczacıbaşı Istanbul
12	Esra Gümüş	2 October 1982	middle blocker	(Turkey) Eczacıbaşı Istanbul
16	İpek Soroğlu	12 March 1985	middle blocker	(Turkey) Beşiktaş JK
17	Neslihan Demir	9 December 1983	opposite	(Turkey) VakıfGüneş Istanbul
18	Seda Tokatlıoğlu	25 June 1986	outside hitter	(Turkey) Fenerbahçe SK
