= Volleyball at the 2011 Arab Games – Women's team rosters =

This article shows all roster of the women's volleyball tournament at the 2011 Pan Arab Games that was held in Doha, Qatar from December 10 to 21, 2011. In this women's 5 teams participated.

== Algeria ==
No.	Name	Date of birth	Position	Club
-	Kamel Imloul		coach	
2	Amina Saoud	18 July 1993	opposite	(Algeria) ASW Béjaïa
3	Salima Hammaouche	17 January 1984	libero	(Algeria) GSP Algeri
5	Sihem Sauod	18 July 1993	middle blocker	(Algeria) ASW Béjaïa
6	Silya Magnana	16 March 1991	outside hitter	(Algeria) ASW Béjaïa
8	Zohra Bensalem	5 April 1990	outside hitter	(Algeria) GSP Algeri
10	Fatma Zahra Oukazi	18 January 1984	setter	(Algeria) GSP Algeri
11	Mouni Abderrahim	19 November 1985	outside hitter	(Algeria) ASW Béjaïa
12	Safia Boukhima	10 January 1991	outside hitter	(Algeria) ASW Béjaïa
13	Nawel Mansouri	1 August 1985	libero	(Algeria) Nacéria Béjaïa
14	Faïza Tsabet	22 March 1985	outside hitter	(Algeria) Nedjmet Chlef
15	Aicha Mezemate	6 June 1991	middle blocker	(Algeria) Nacéria Béjaïa
18	Tassadit Aissou	19 June 1989	middle blocker	(Algeria) ASW Béjaïa

== Egypt ==
No.	Name	Date of birth	Position	Club
-	Tahny Toson		coach	
1	Sherihan Abd El Fattah	25 September 1986	outside hitter	(Egypt) Al-Ahly SC
2	Nehal Ahmed	25 January 1993	libero	(Egypt) El Shams Club
3	Dina El Bitar	16 January 1990	outside hitter	(Egypt) El Shams Club
4	Shorouk Mahmoud	20 January 1992		(Egypt) Al-Ahly SC
6	Nada Nassef	11 November 1990	outside hitter	(Egypt) Al-Ahly SC
8	Nahla Abd El Fattah	21 January 1990	libero	(Egypt) Al-Ahly SC
9	Samaa Ali	1 January 1989	setter	(Egypt) Al-Ahly SC
10	Engy El Shamy	9 September 1986	middle blocker	(Egypt) Al-Ahly SC
11	Aya El Shamy	27 November 1995		(Egypt) El Shams Club
12	Yasmin Hussein	2 January 1992		
13	Nirmeen Seifelnasr	17 July 1992		(Egypt) Al-Ahly SC
15	Farida El Askalany	14 February 1995		(Egypt) Al-Ahly SC

== United Arab Emirates ==
No.	Name	Date of birth	Position	Club
-	Esam Khorshid		coach	
1	Fatma Hassan	14 June 1986		
2	Alya Hassan	4 August 1987		
3	Rawda Alflasy	1 March 1989		
4	Kalaitham Rahma	8 February 1989		
6	Rawya Bekhit	25 September 1986		
7	Bedur Hamad	4 December 1989	libero	
8	Fatma Almamary	8 July 1993		
10	Muna Abbas	20 August 1986		
11	Nadia Ali	9 November 1983		
15	Muna Abulla	31 August 1987		
18	Amel Hashimi	31 December 1977		

== Kuwait ==
No.	Name	Date of birth	Position	Club
-	Fawzy Matwk		coach	
2	Dana Ahmed	14 October 1995		(Kuwait) Salwa Alsubah
3	Jumanah Ahmed	6 January 1988		(Kuwait) Alfatat
5	Hajer Ghaber	7 August 1996		(Kuwait) Aloyoun
7	Nour Adel	16 February 1992		(Kuwait) Salwa Alsubah
8	Hawraa Mahmoud	18 May 1996		(Kuwait) Alfatat
9	Lujeyn Amer	25 June 1993		(Kuwait) Salwa Alsubah
16	Anwar Sami	26 November 1985		(Kuwait) Salwa Alsubah

== Qatar ==
No.	Name	Date of birth	Position	Club
-	Mercedes Pomares		coach	
1	Safiya Omar	15 February 1983		(Qatar) QWSC
4	Huda Al-Jufairi	31 August 1996		(Qatar) QWSC
5	Zainab Al-Majid	13 July 1993	libero	(Qatar) QWSC
6	Sara Poorghaib	21 October 1985		(Qatar) QWSC
8	Jawaher Mohammed	16 August 1987		(Qatar) QWSC
9	Kaltham Al-Sowaidi	21 July 1994		(Qatar) QWSC
10	Salma Al-Madhoun	16 November 1993		(Qatar) QWSC
11	Dana Al-Madhoun	8 January 1997		(Qatar) QWSC
12	Maryam Mubarak	21 January 1982		(Qatar) QWSC
13	Bakhita Al-Obaidli	7 February 1986		(Qatar) QWSC
14	Ashjan Ali	9 July 1994		(Qatar) QWSC
18	Reem Torki	24 June 1986		(Qatar) QWSC
