= Algeria women's national volleyball team =

National sports team

Algeria
- Association: Algerian Volleyball Federation
- Confederation: CAVB
- Head coach: (Algeria) Yacine Djelloui
- FIVB ranking: 74 ▲5 (2 October 2026)

Uniforms
| Home | Away |

Summer Olympics
- Appearances: 2 (First in 2008)
- Best result: 11th (2008, 2012)

World Championship
- Appearances: 1 (First in 2010)
- Best result: 21st (2010)
- www.afvb.org

Algeria women's national volleyball team
Medal record

African Championship
| Gold medal – first place | 2009 Blida | Team competition |
| Silver medal – second place | 2007 Nairobi | Team competition |
| Silver medal – second place | 2011 Nairobi | Team competition |
| Silver medal – second place | 2015 Nairobi | Team competition |

All-Africa Games
| Gold medal – first place | 1978 Algiers | Team competition |
| Gold medal – first place | 2007 Algiers | Team competition |
| Gold medal – first place | 2011 Maputo | Team competition |

The Algeria women's national volleyball team represents Algeria in international volleyball competitions.

== Results ==
=== Olympic Games ===
- 2008 — 11th
- 2012 — 11th

=== World Championship ===
- 2010 — 21st

=== World Cup ===
- 2011 — 11th
- 2015 — 12th

=== World Grand Prix ===
- 2013 — 20th
- 2014 — 28th
- 2015 — 27th
- 2016 — 28th
- 2017 — 32nd

=== African Championship ===
- 2003 — 4th place
- 2007 — (silver)
- 2009 — (gold)
- 2011 — (silver)
- 2013 — 6th place
- 2015 — (silver)
- 2017 — 6th place
- 2019 — 5th place
- 2021 — Did not qualify
- 2023 — 5th place
- 2026 — 6th place

=== African Games ===
- 1978 (gold) Gold medal
- 2007 (gold) Gold medal
- 2011 (gold) Gold medal
- 2015 – 5th

=== Mediterranean Games ===
- 1975 – 5th
- 1983 – 6th
- 2009 – 7th
- 2022 – 10th

=== Pan Arab Games ===
- 1997 (silver) 2nd
- 2011 (silver) 2nd

== Squads ==
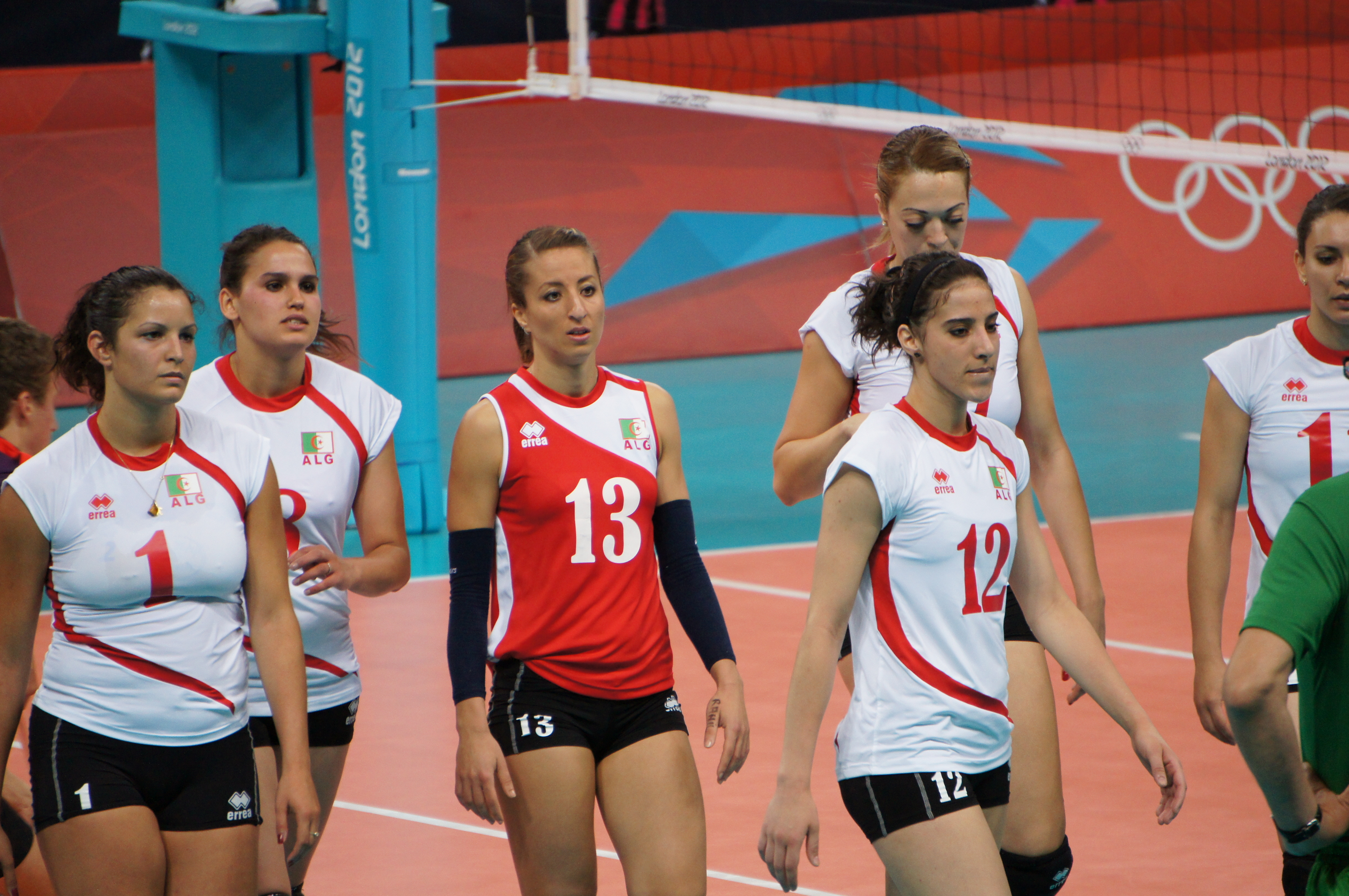
Algeria women's national volleyball team at the 2012 Summer Olympics

(2008–present)

2013 FIVB World Grand Prix

- Lydia Oulmou No. 17, Mouni Abderrahim No. 11 (C), Zohra Bensalem No. 8, Safia Boukhima No. 12, Tassadit Aissou No. 18, Nawel Mansouri No. 13 L, Fatma-Zohra Oukazi No. 10, Silya Magnana No. 6,Salima Hamouche No. 3 L, Fatima Zahra Djouad No. 4, Kahina Messaoudene No. 14, Aicha Mezmat No. 15, Manel Yaakoubi No. 5, Celia Bourihane No. 19, Kahina Arbouche No. 20, Nawel Hammouche No. 21,Nadira Aït oumghar No. 1, Amina Saoud No. 9, Sihem Saoud No. 16, Dallal Merwa Achour No. 2, Sarra Belhocine No. 5 and Yasmine Ousalah No. 22.

Head coach: Aimed Saidani Second coach: Candida Rosa Jimenez Amaro

2012 Olympic Games

- Lydia Oulmou No. 17 (C), Mouni Abderrahim No. 11, Zohra Bensalem No. 8, Safia Boukhima No. 12, Tassadit Aissou No. 18, Nawel Mansouri No. 13 L, Salima Hamouche No. 3 L, Sehryne Hennaoui No. 1, Amel Khamtache No. 5, Celia Bourihane No. 19, Dallal Merwa Achour No. 2, and Sarra Belhocine No. 9.

Head coach: Georg Strumilo Second coach: Aimed Saidani

2012 Olympic Games African qualifiers

- Fatma-Zohra Oukazi, Faïza Tsabet, Lydia Oulmou, Mouni Abderrahim, Melinda Hanaoui, Tassadit Aïssou, Salima Hamouche, Safia Boukhima, Aicha Mezmat, Zohra Bensalem, Silya Magnana and Nawel Mansouri.

Head coach: Georg Strumilo Second coach: Aimed Saidani

2011 FIVB Women's World Cup

- Fatma-Zohra Oukazi, Faïza Tsabet, Lydia Oulmou, Mouni Abderrahim, Melinda Hanaoui, Tassadit Aïssou, Salima Hamouche, Safia Boukhima, Yasmine Oudni, Fatima Zahra Djouad, Silya Magnana and Aicha Mezmat.

Head coach: Ahmed Boukacem Second coach: Kamel Trabelsi

2010 FIVB Women's World Championship

- Narimène Madani, Fatma-Zohra Oukazi, Faïza Tsabet, Lydia Oulmou, Nawel Mansouri, Mouni Abderrahim, Silya Magnana, Fatima Zahra Djouad, Zohra Bensalem, Tassadit Aïssou, Salima Hamouche and Safia Boukhima.

Head coach: Mouloud Ikhdji Second coach: Boussaid Salah Scout: Redjdal Mohand

2010 woman's world championship Africa pool D qualifying tournament

- Narimène Madani, Fatma-Zohra Oukazi, Faïza Tsabet, Sérine Hanaoui, Lydia Oulmou, Nawel Mansouri, Mouni Abderrahim, Yasmine Oudni, Zohra Bensalem, Tassadit Aïssou, Salima Hamouche, and Safia Boukhima

Head coach: Mouloud Ikhdji Second coach: Boussaid Salah Scout: Redjdal Mohand

2008 Olympic Team

- Narimène Madani, Fatma-Zohra Oukazi, Faïza Tsabet, Sérine Hanaoui, Lydia Oulmou, Nawel Mansouri, Mouni Abderrahim, Melinda Hanaoui, Nassima Ben Hamouda, Tassadit Aïssou, Raouia Rouabhia, and Safia Boukhima

Head coach: Mouloud Ikhdji Second coach: Boussaid Salah Scout: Redjdal Mohand
