= Hanaoui =

Hanaoui is a surname. Notable people with the surname include:

- Melinda Hanaoui (born 1990), Algerian volleyball player
- Sehryne Hanaoui (born 1988), Algerian volleyball player
