= MC Alger (women's volleyball) =

Algerian women's volleyball team

MC Alger WVB
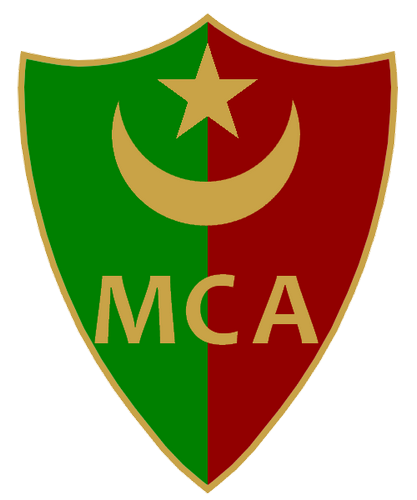
- Full name: Mouloudia Club d'Alger
- Short name: MCA
- Founded: 1947; 79 years ago, as Mouloudia Club d'Alger; 2008; 18 years ago, as GS Pétroliers
- Ground: Hacène Harcha Arena
- Chairman: Djaffar Bel Hocine

Uniforms
Home	Away

Mouloudia Club d'Alger (Arabic: نادي مولودية الجزائر), referred to as MC Alger or MCA for short, is an Algerian women's volleyball team that was founded on 1947, as a division of MC Alger. They play their home games in Hacène Harcha Arena, which has a capacity of 8,000 people. They were allocated one of two wildcard spots for the 2014 edition of FIVB Volleyball Women's Club World Championship held in Zurich, Switzerland after winning the African Championships.

== History ==
From 2008 to 2020, the team was known as GS Pétroliers as it was part of the multi-sports club with that name.

The team's name changed back to MC Alger in 2020.

== Previous names ==
- Mouloudia Chaâbia d'Alger (1947→1977)
- Mouloudia Pétroliers d'Alger (1977→1988)
- Mouloudia Club d'Alger (1988→2008)
- Groupement Sportif des Pétroliers (2008–2020)

== Team roster ==
2013-2014

#	Player	Position	Height (m)	Birth date
1	(Algeria) Salima Hammouche	Libero	1.58	17/01/1984
2	(Algeria) Lilya Djenaoui	Unknown	1.72	25/05/1997
3	(Algeria) Ahlam Amrani	Unknown	1.78	14/10/1991
4	(Algeria) Aicha Mezemate	Middle Blocker	1.87	06/06/1991
5	(Algeria) Amel Khamtache	Unknown	1.81	04/05/1981
7	(Algeria) Zohra Bensalem	Universal	1.78	05/04/1990
8	(Algeria) Sara Belhocine	Unknown	1.78	18/09/1994
9	(Algeria) Djouhar Allache Atouche	Unknown	1.78	31/10/1987
10	(Algeria) Fatima Zahra (c)	Setter	1.75	18/01/1984
11	(Algeria) Malek Djari	Unknown	1.82	13/01/1999
12	(Algeria) Safia Boukhima	Wing Spiker	1.76	10/01/1991
13	(Algeria) Yasmine Oudni	Universal	1.82	02/08/1989

== Technical and managerial staff ==
Name	Role	Nationality
	Manager	Algerian
Salim Achouri	Coach	Algerian
Mokrane Idrici	Assistant Coach	Algerian
Hamid Setti	Team manager	Algerian
Zohra Fatima Harbouche	Physiotherapist	Algerian

== Honors ==
=== National achievements ===
- Algerian Championship :

Winners (24 titles) : (1978, 1979, 1980, 1983, 1985, 1986, 1987, 1988, 1989, 1990, 1992, 1993, 1997, 1998, 2000, 2001, 2002, 2003, 2007, 2008, 2009, 2010, 2011, 2013)
Runners up () :

- Algerian Cup :

Winners (23x cups) :
Runners up (x vice champions) :

=== International achievements ===
- African Club Championship :

Winners (1x title) : 2014
Runners up (3x vice champions) : 2002, 2008, 2013

== Head coaches ==
Dates	Name
→	
→	
→	
→	
→	
→	

As of 2014

== Notable players ==
- (Algeria) Amel Khamtache
- (Algeria) Fatima Zahra
- (Algeria) Narimene Madani
- (Algeria) Naïma Belabes
- (Algeria) Nassima Ben Hamouda
- (Algeria) Nawal Mansouri
- (Algeria) Salima Hammouche
