= Lilya Djenaoui =

Algerian volleyball player (born 1997)

Personal information
- Nationality: Algerian
- Born: 25 May 1997 (age 29)
- Height: 172 cm (5 ft 8 in)
- Weight: 58 kg (128 lb)
- Spike: 288 cm (113 in)
- Block: 284 cm (112 in)

Volleyball information
- Number: 2

Career
Years	Teams
2014	GS Petroliers

Lilya Djenaoui (born 25 May 1997) is an Algerian female volleyball player. With her club GS Petroliers she competed at the 2014 FIVB Volleyball Women's Club World Championship.
