= Nawel Hammouche =

Algerian volleyball player (born 1997)

Personal information
- Nationality: Algerian
- Born: 25 April 1997 (age 29)
- Height: 185 cm (73 in)
- Weight: 62 kg (137 lb)
- Spike: 275 cm (108 in)
- Block: 265 cm (104 in)

Volleyball information
- Number: 2 (national team)

Career
Years	Teams
2014	Ncbejaia

National team
2014	Algeria

Nawel Hammouche (born 25 April 1997) is an Algerian female volleyball player. She is part of the Algeria women's national volleyball team.

She participated in the 2015 and 2017 FIVB Volleyball World Grand Prix. On club level she played for Ncbejaia in 2014.
