= Celia Bourihane =

Algerian volleyball player (born 1995)

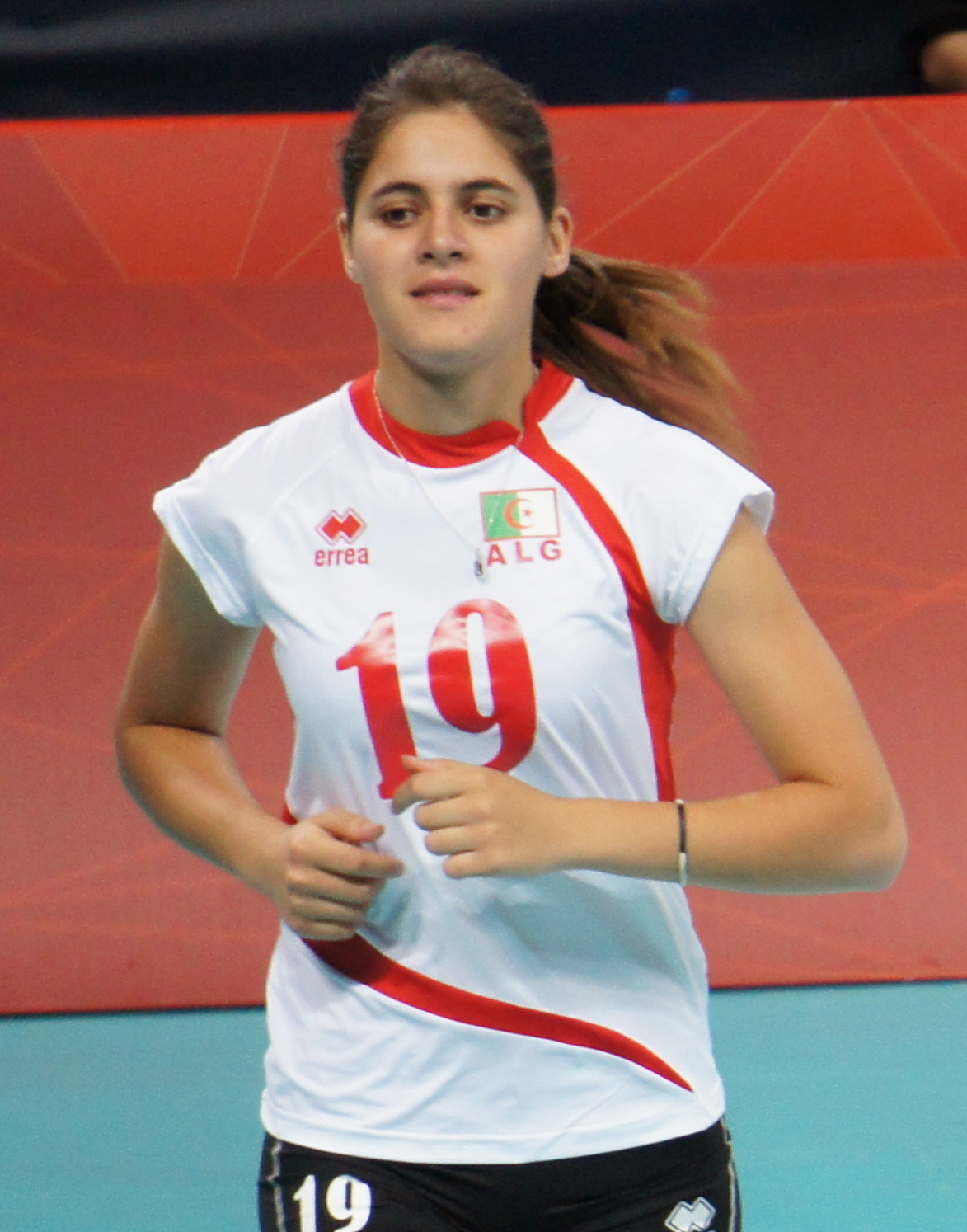
Image of Celia Bourihane in 2012 Summer Olympics

Celia Bourihane (born January 22, 1995, in Béjaïa) is an Algerian volleyball player. She participated in the 2012 London Olympics playing on the Algerian volleyball team.

== Clubs ==
- Debut and Current club: (Algeria) MC Alger
