= Dallal Merwa Achour =

Algerian volleyball player (born 1994)

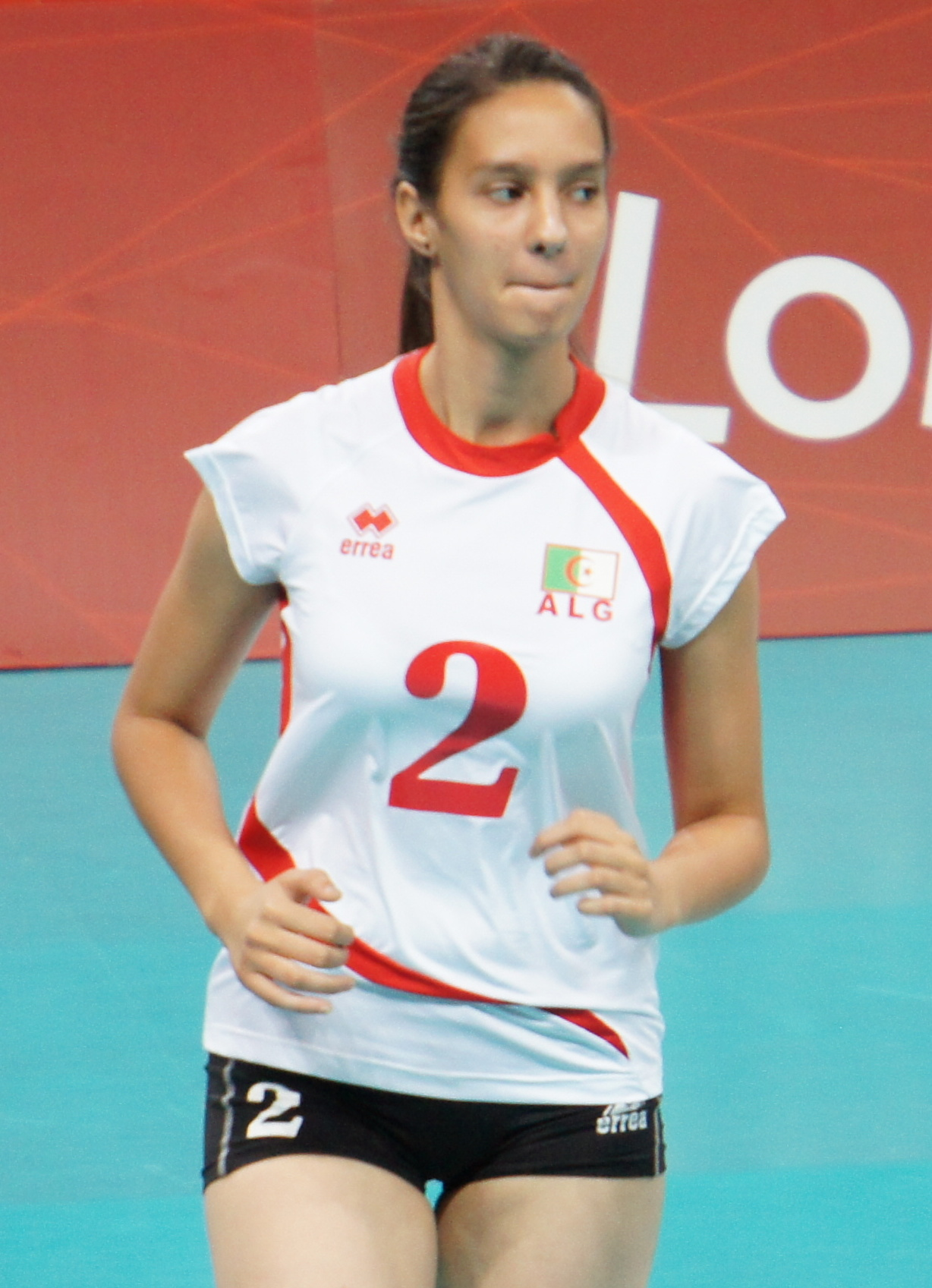
Algeria women's national volleyball team at the 2012 Summer Olympics

Dallal Merwa Achour (born 3 November 1994 in Blida, Algeria) is an Algerian volleyball player. Achour has been selected to play for the Algeria women's national volleyball team at the 2012 Summer Olympics.

== Clubs ==
- Debut and current club : (Algeria) ESF Mouzaïa
