= Amina Saoud =

Algerian volleyball player (born 1993)

Personal information
- Nationality: Algerian
- Born: 18 July 1993 (age 33)
- Height: 173 cm (68 in)
- Weight: 62 kg (137 lb)
- Spike: 295 cm (116 in)
- Block: 280 cm (110 in)

Volleyball information
- Number: 9 (national team)

Career
Years	Teams
2013	ASWBEJAIA

National team
2013	Algeria

Amina Saoud (born 18 July 1993) is an Algerian female volleyball player. She was part of the Algeria women's national volleyball team. She participated in the 2013 FIVB Volleyball World Grand Prix. On club level she played for ASWBEJAIA in 2013.
