= Dina El Bitar =

Egyptian volleyball player (born 1990)

Personal information
- Nationality: Egyptian
- Born: 16 January 1990 (age 36)

Volleyball information
- Position: outside hitter
- Number: 3 (national team)

Career
Years	Teams
2011	(Egypt) El Shams Club

National team
2011	Egypt

Dina El Bitar (born 16 January 1990) is an Egyptian female volleyball player, playing as an outside hitter. She was part of the Egypt women's national volleyball team. Her team won the gold medal at the 2011 Pan Arab Games. On club level, she played for El Shams Club in 2011.
