= Paola Croce =

Italian volleyball player (born 1978)

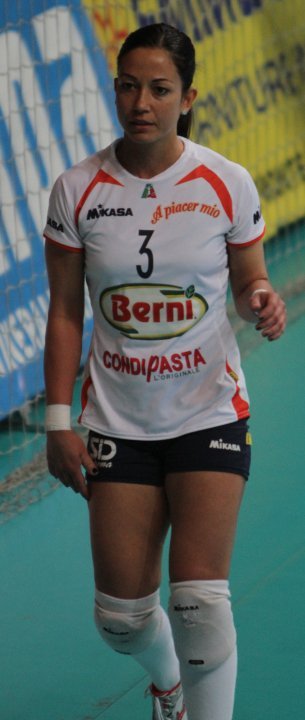

Personal information
- Born: 6 March 1978 (age 48); Rome, Italy
- Height: 167 cm (5 ft 6 in)
- Weight: 52 kg (115 lb)
- Spike: 290 cm (114 in)
- Block: 265 cm (104 in)

Volleyball information
- Position: Libero

National team
| 2002 - 2012 | Italy |
Medal record
Women's volleyball
Representing Italy
European Championship
| Gold medal – first place | 2007 Belgium/Luxembourg | Team |
FIVB World Grand Prix
| Bronze medal – third place | 2007 Ningbo | Team |
Mediterranean Games
| Gold medal – first place | 2009 Pescara | Team |

Paola Croce (born 6 March 1978, in Rome) is an Italian former volleyball player, who played as a libero. She last played for Chateau D'Ax Urbino Volley in 2013.

She has twice competed at the Olympics as part of the Italian national team, finishing 5th in 2008 and 2012. She was part of the Italian team that won the 2007 European Championship. In the same year, she was part of the Italian team that won the bronze medal at the World Grand Prix.
