= Klonarda Nezaj =

Albanian volleyball player (born 1988)

- Klonarda Nezaj, FSHV Cup 2014

Personal information
- Full name: Klonarda Nezaj
- Nationality: Albania
- Born: 20 July 1988 (age 38); Tropojë, Albania
- Hometown: Tirana, Albania
- Height: 1.83 m (6 ft 0 in)
- Weight: 69 kg (152 lb)
- Spike: 306 cm (120 in)

Volleyball information
- Position: Middle Blocker/Hitter
- Current club: Mirdita Volley
- Number: 10

Career
Years	Teams
2005–2009; 2009–2010; 2010–2011; 2011–2013; 2013–2015; 2015-2016; 2017-2018; 2018	SK Tirana Volley; Hagerstown CC; Minatori Rrëshen; SK Tirana Volley; Barleti Volley; SK Tirana Volley; Partizani Volley; Mirdita Volley

National team
2007 –	Albanian women's national volleyball team
Honours
Women's volleyball
Representing Albania
Albanian Championship
Silver medal – second place	2007	SK Tirana Volley
Gold medal – first place	2008	SK Tirana Volley
Gold medal – first place	2009	SK Tirana Volley
Gold medal – first place	2011	Minatori Rreshen
Gold medal – first place	2013	SK Tirana Volley
Gold medal – first place	2014	Barleti Volley
Gold medal – first place	2015	Barleti Volley
Silver medal – second place	2016	SK Tirana Volley
Gold medal – first place	2018	Partizani Volley
Albanian National Cup
Gold medal – first place	2008	SK Tirana Volley
Silver medal – second place	2009	SK Tirana Volley
Gold medal – first place	2011	Minatori Rreshen
Gold medal – first place	2012	SK Tirana Volley
Gold medal – first place	2013	SK Tirana Volley
Gold medal – first place	2014	Barleti Volley
Gold medal – first place	2015	Barleti Volley
Silver medal – second place	2016	SK Tirana Volley
Gold medal – first place	2018	Partizani Volley
- Last updated: May 2014

Klonarda Nezaj (born 20 July 1988) is an Albanian volleyball player. She is a member of the Albanian women's volleyball national team and Albanian women's pro teams. Her role is middle blocker/hitter. She has been playing volleyball since she was 13 years old. She has a bachelor's and master's degree in law.

After taking a season off to dedicate to her family, she returned to play for Partizani Volley and seized both Albanian Cup and Championship for season 2017–2018. Currently playing with Mirdita Volley.

== Clubs & Awards ==
- (Albania) SK Tirana Volley (2005–2009)
- (Albania) Minatori Rreshen (2010–2011)
- (Albania) SK Tirana Volley (2011–2013)
- (Albania) Barleti Volley (2013-2015)
- (Albania) SK Tirana Volley (2015–2016)
- (Albania) Partizani Volley (2017-2018)
- (Albania) Partizani Volley (2017-2018)
- (Albania) Mirdita Volley (2018-2019)
- (Albania) Partizani Volley (2019-2020)
- 2008, 2009, 2013 Albanian League Championship – Champion, with SK Tirana Volley
- 2011 Albanian League Championship – Champion, with Minatori Rreshen
- 2014, 2015 Albanian League Championship – Champion, with Barleti Volley
- 2018 Albanian League Championship – Champion, with Partizani Volley
- 2008, 2012, 2013 Albanian Cup Championship – Champion, with SK Tirana Volley
- 2011 Albanian Cup Championship – Champion, with Minatori Rreshen
- 2014, 2015 Albanian Cup Championship – Champion, with Barleti Volley
- 2018 Albanian Cup Championship – Champion, with Partizani Volley
