= 2009 Women's African Volleyball Championship =

The 2009 Women's African Volleyball Championship was held in Blida, Algeria, from October 3 to October 8, 2009.

== Results ==
Date		Score		Set 1	Set 2	Set 3	Set 4	Set 5	Total
3 Oct	Senegal	3 – 1	Botswana	18-25	25-18	26-24	25-21		94-88
3 Oct	Tunisia	3 – 0	Morocco	25-17	25-9	25-16			75-42
3 Oct	Algeria	3 – 1	Cameroon	20-25	25-13	25-18	28-26		98-82
4 Oct	Cameroon	1 – 3	Tunisia	25-20	21-25	15-25	17-25		78-95
4 Oct	Morocco	0 – 3	Botswana	19-25	23-25	20-25			62-75
4 Oct	Algeria	3 – 0	Senegal	25-13	25-19	25-14			75-46
5 Oct	Tunisia	3 – 0	Botswana	25-14	25-14	25-16			75-44
5 Oct	Cameroon	3 – 0	Senegal	25-18	25-19	25-14			75-51
5 Oct	Algeria	3 – 0	Morocco	25-11	25-19	25-11			75-41
7 Oct	Senegal	3 – 1	Morocco	18-25	25-17	25-20	25-21		93-83
7 Oct	Cameroon	3 – 1	Botswana	25-21	22-25	25-22	25-22		97-90
7 Oct	Algeria	3 – 0	Tunisia	25-21	25-17	25-15			75-53
8 Oct	Cameroon	3 – 0	Morocco	25-13	25-10	25-21			75-44
8 Oct	Tunisia	3 – 0	Senegal	25-14	25-19	25-18			75-51
8 Oct	Algeria	3 – 0	Botswana	25-19	25-08	25-11			75-38

== Standings ==
Pos	Team	Pld	W	L	Pts	SW	SL	SR	SPW	SPL	SPR
1	Algeria	5	5	0	10	15	1	15.000	398	260	1.531
2	Tunisia	5	4	1	9	12	4	3.000	373	290	1.286
3	Cameroon	5	3	2	8	11	7	1.571	407	378	1.077
4	Senegal	5	2	3	7	6	11	0.545	335	396	0.846
5	Botswana	5	1	4	6	5	12	0.417	335	403	0.831
6	Morocco	5	0	5	5	1	15	0.067	272	393	0.692
