= Choi Youn-ok =

South Korean volleyball player (born 1985)

Choi Youn-Ok

Personal information
- Nationality: South Korean
- Born: 23 April 1985 (age 41)
- Height: 173 cm (68 in)
- Weight: 59 kg (130 lb)
- Spike: 290 cm (114 in)
- Block: 280 cm (110 in)

Volleyball information
- Number: 6 (national team)

National team
2011	South Korea

Choi Youn-Ok (Korean: 최윤옥; Hanja: 崔允玉; born 23 April 1985) is a retired South Korean female volleyball player. She was part of the South Korea women's national volleyball team.

She participated in the 2011 FIVB Volleyball Women's World Cup, and the 2015 FIVB Volleyball World Grand Prix.
