= Fatma Zahra Djouad =

Algerian volleyball player (born 1988)

Personal information
- Nationality: Algerian
- Born: 12 July 1988 (age 38)
- Height: 180 cm (71 in)
- Weight: 62 kg (137 lb)
- Spike: 295 cm (116 in)
- Block: 285 cm (112 in)

Volleyball information
- Number: 4 (national team)

Career
Years	Teams
2013	MBBEJAIA

National team
2013	Algeria

Fatma Zahra Djouad (born 12 July 1988) is an Algerian female volleyball player. She was part of the Algeria women's national volleyball team.

She participated in the 2013 FIVB Volleyball World Grand Prix. On club level she played for MBBEJAIA in 2013.
