= Sarra Belhocine =

Algerian volleyball player (born 1994)

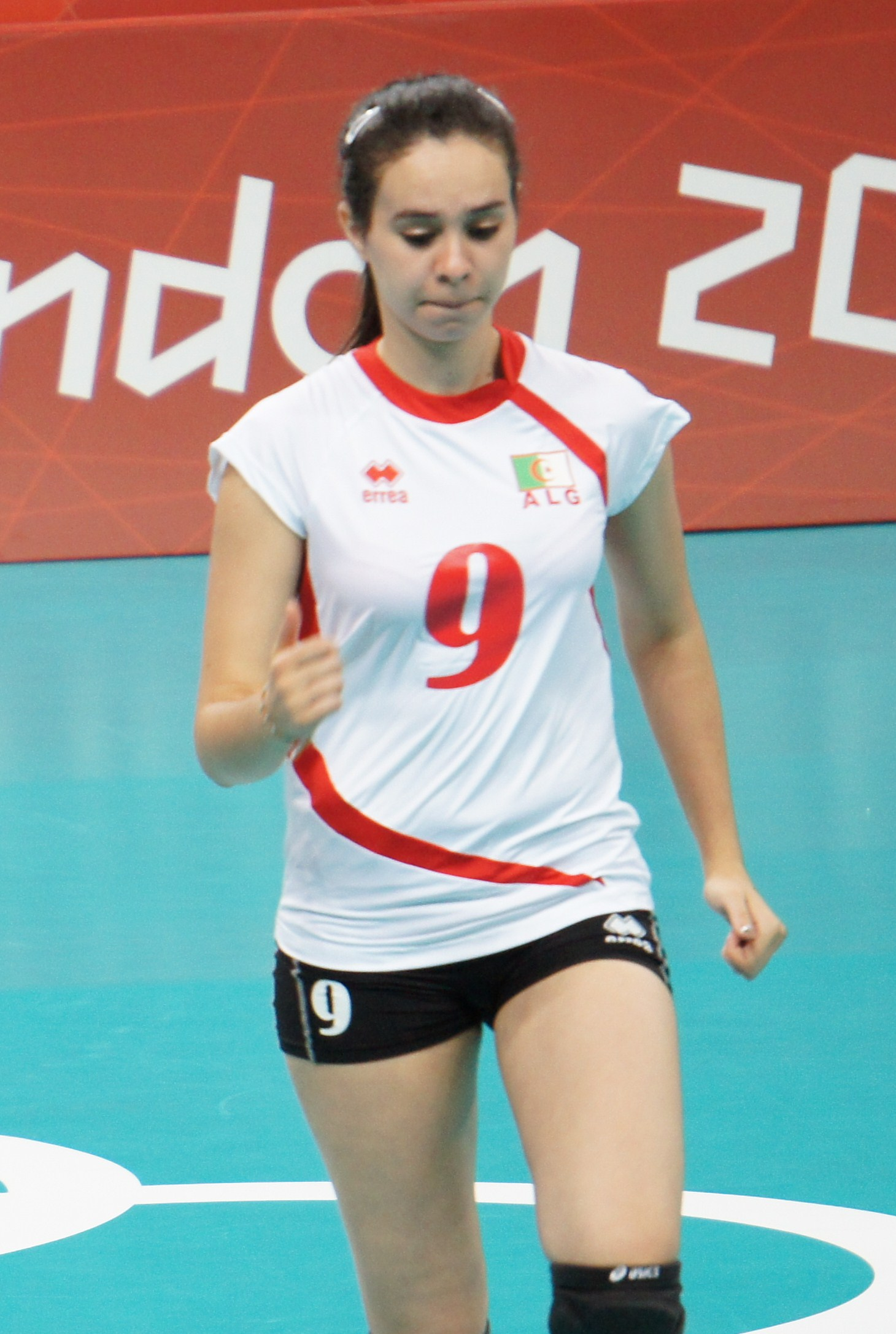
Sarra Belhocine i 2012

Sarra Belhocine (born 18 September 1994 in Algiers) is an Algerian volleyball player. She played on the Algerian women's volleyball team in the 2012 Summer Olympics.

== Clubs ==
- current club : (Algeria) GSP (ex MC Alger)
