= Silya Magnana =

Algerian volleyball player (born 1991)

Silya Magnana (born March 16, 1991, in Béjaïa) is an Algerian international volleyball player, playing as setter.

== Club information ==
Current club : (Algeria) MB Bejaia

Previous club : (Algeria) ASW Bejaia

Previous club : (Algeria) NCB Bejaia

== See also ==
- Algeria women's national volleyball team
