= Raouia Rouabhia =

Algerian volleyball player (born 1978)

Raouia Rouabhia (born June 25, 1978 in Meyrargues, France) is a retired Algerian international volleyball player.

== Club information ==
Current club : Venelle Volleyball (France)
