= Nassima Ben Hamouda =

Algerian volleyball player (born 1973)

Nassima Saleha Ben Hamouda Akouche (born October 20, 1973, in Villeurbanne, France) is an Algerian retired international volleyball player.

== Club information ==
Last club : MC Alger (Algeria)
