= Mélinda Hennaoui =

Algerian volleyball player (born 1990)

Melinda Raissa Hennaoui
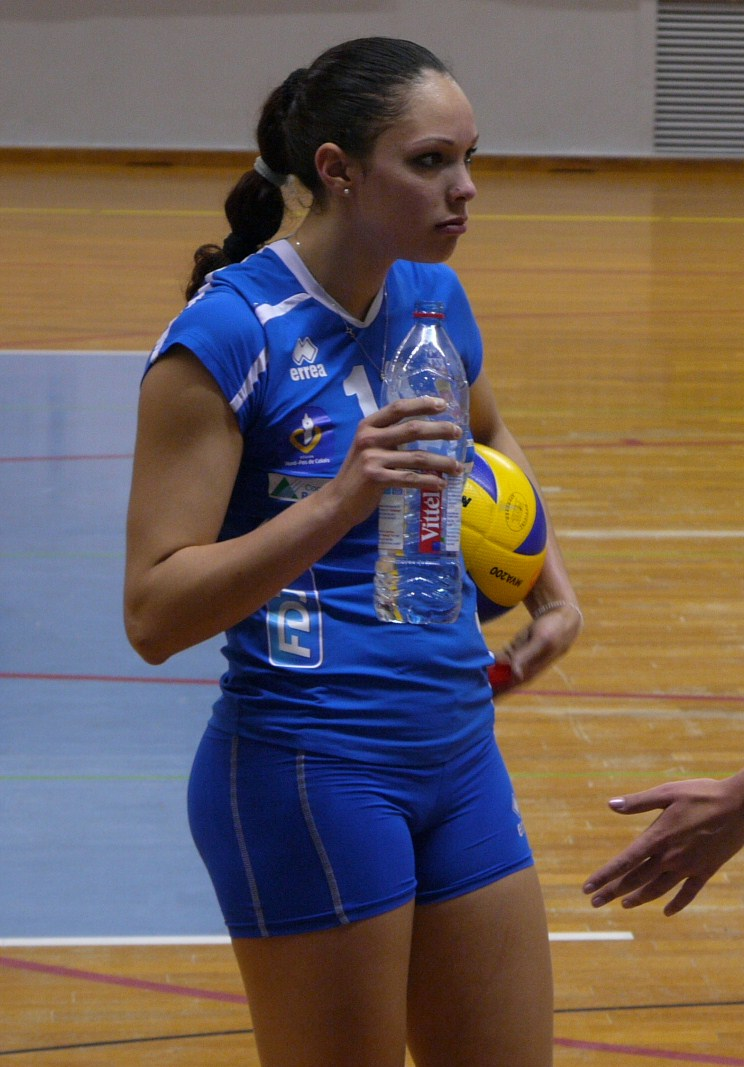
- Hennaoui in 2011

Personal information
- Nationality: Algerian
- Born: 18 March 1990 (age 36); Bouïra
- Height: 178 cm (70 in)
- Weight: 68 kg (150 lb)
- Spike: 295 cm (116 in)
- Block: 284 cm (112 in)

Volleyball information
- Number: 5 (national team)

National team
2011	Algeria

Melinda Raissa Hennaoui (born March 18, 1990) is an Algerian female volleyball player. She was part of the Algeria women's national volleyball team.

== Club information ==
- Current club : (France) Istres volleyball
- Debut club : (France) Lyon volleyball
