= Tassadit Aïssou =

Algerian volleyball player (born 1989)

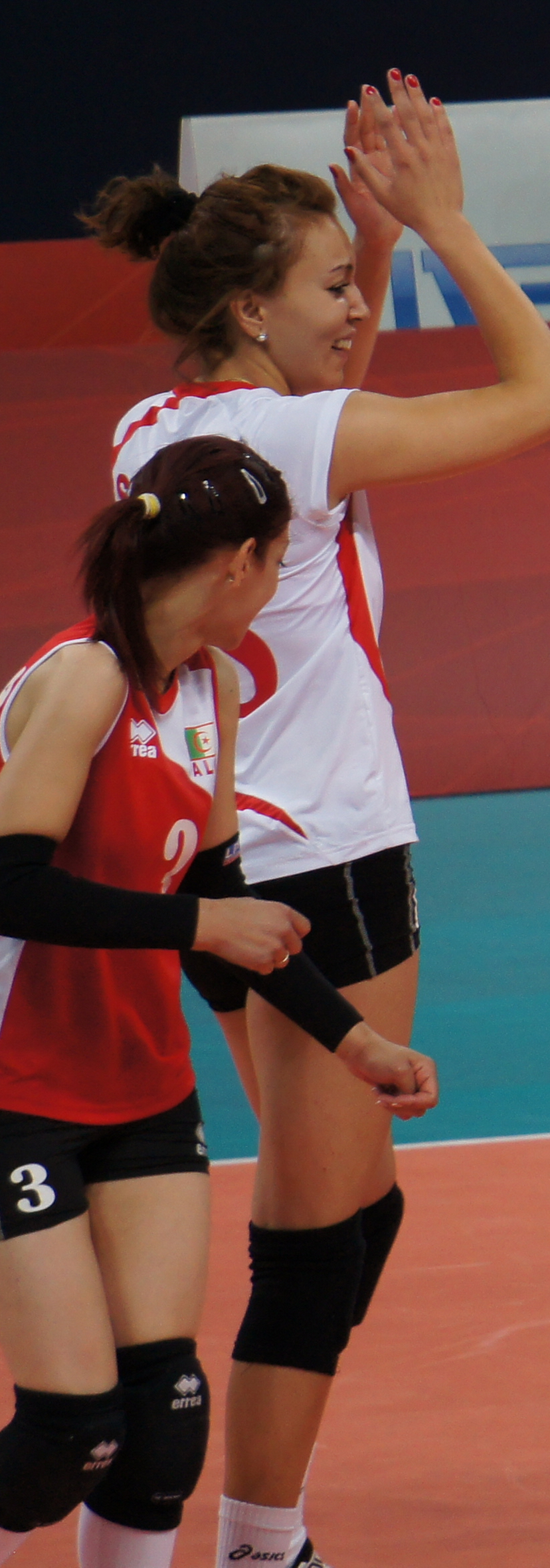
- Tassadit Aïssou in 2012

Personal information
- Nickname: Sassa
- Nationality: Algerian
- Born: June 19, 1989 (age 37); Sidi Aïch, Béjaïa, Algeria
- Hometown: El-Flaye, Béjaïa, Algeria
- Height: 184 cm (6 ft 0 in)
- Weight: 80 kg (176 lb)
- Spike: 295 cm (116 in)
- Block: 285 cm (112 in)

Volleyball information
- Position: Middle-blocker

Career
Teams
Seddouk Volleyball
	Association Sportive Wilaya (ASWB)
	Nedjmet Chlef

National team
2008, 2012	Algeria

Tassadit Aïssou (born June 19, 1989) is an Algerian volleyball player and Olympian representing Algeria. She is a middle-blocker. She attended Chouhada Chikhoune High School in Béjaïa.

Aïssou represented Algeria in the Women's African Volleyball Championships in 2007, 2009, 2011, and 2013; the 2009 Mediterranean Games; the 2008 and 2012 Summer Olympics; the 2010 FIVB World Championships; the 2011 All-Africa Games; the 2011 FIVB World Cup; the 2011 Pan Arab Games; the 2012 African Clubs Championship; and the 2013 and 2014 FIVB Volleyball World Grand Prix.

== Club information ==
- Current club : (Algeria) NR Chlef
- Current club : (Algeria) ASW Bejaia
- Debut club : (Algeria) Seddouk Volleyball Bejaia
