= Zohra Bensalem =

Algerian volleyball player (born 1990)

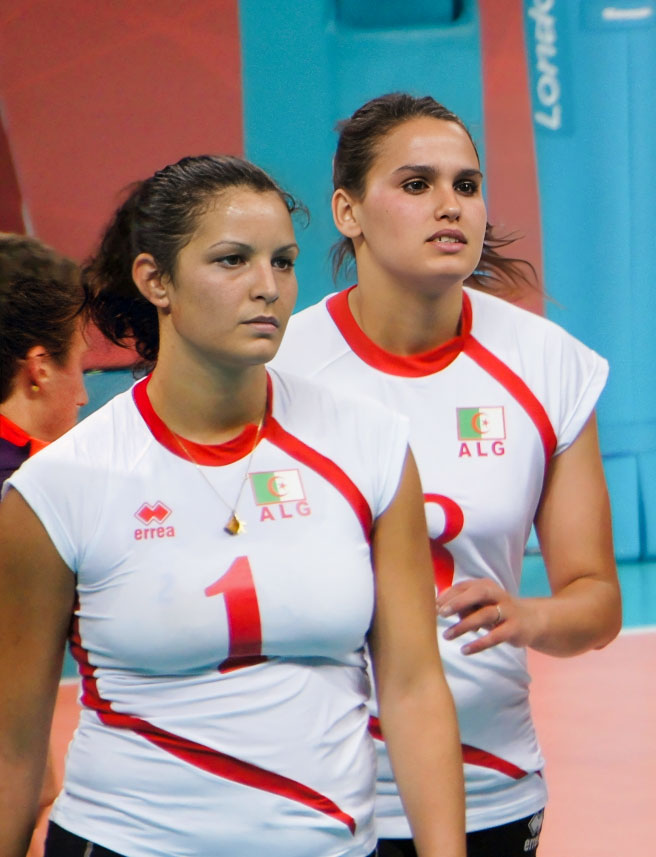
- Zahra Bensalem (on the right) in 2012.
- Born: April 5, 1990 (age 36); Béjaïa
- Occupation: Volleyball player

Zohra Bensalem (born April 5, 1990, in Béjaïa) is an Algerian international volleyball player. She competed for Algeria at the 2012 Summer Olympics.

== Club information ==
- Current club : (Algeria) GSP (ex MC Alger)
- Debut club : (Algeria) ASW Bejaia
