= Narimène Madani =

Algerian volleyball player (born 1984)

Narimène Madani (born March 12, 1984, in Béjaïa) is an Algerian international volleyball player. She represented the Algerian national team at the 2008 Beijing Olympics.

== Club information ==
Current club : MB Bejaia (Algeria)

Previous club : (Algeria) GSP ( ex MC Algiers)

Previous club: NC Bejaia (Algeria)

Debut club: MB Bejaia (Algeria)
