= Lydia Oulmou =

Algerian volleyball player (born 1986)

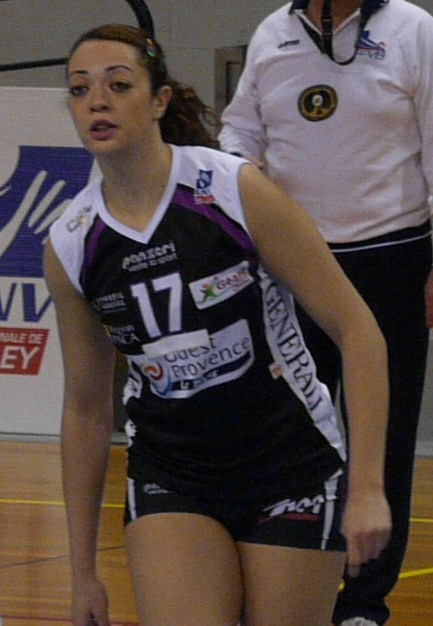
Lydia Oulmou - 2010

Lydia Oulmou (born 2 February 1986) is an Algerian international volleyball player, playing as middle blocker.

She was in the Algerian squad that went to the 2008 Summer Olympics.

She captained the Algerian team at the 2012 Summer Olympics.

== Club information ==
- Current club: (France) Hainaut Volley ( 2012– )
- Previous club: (France) Istres Volleyball (2009–2012)
- Previous club: (France) Melun Val de Seine La Rochette Volley-Ball (2008–2009)
- Previous club: (France) Istres Volleyball (2005–2008)
- Debut club: (Algeria) NC Bejaia (1998–2005)

== Statistics 2009–2012 ==
Season	Club	Games	Spike	Block	Aces
2009–2010	Istres Sports Volley-Ball	13	83 pts	24 pts	11
2010–2011	Istres Sports Volley-Ball	16	83 pts	44 pts	22
2011–2012	Istres Sports Volley-Ball	18	101 pts	44 pts	19
