= Fatima-Zohra Oukazi =

Algerian volleyball player (born 1984)

Fatima Zahra Oukazi

Personal information
- Nationality: Algerian
- Born: 18 January 1984 (age 42)
- Height: 175 cm (69 in)
- Weight: 67 kg (148 lb)
- Spike: 295 cm (116 in)
- Block: 283 cm (111 in)

Volleyball information
- Number: 10 (national team)

Career
Years	Teams
2014	G.S.Petroliers

National team
2008-	Algeria

Fatima-Zohra Oukazi (born 18 January 1984 in Chlef) is an Algerian international volleyball player and Algeria women's national volleyball team captain (2010-2012), playing as setter. At club level she made her debut for GS Chlef, based in her home city of Chlef. She now plays for the Algiers-based GS Petroliers.

== Club information ==
Current club : 2007-current (Algeria) GSP (ex MCA)

Debut club : 1998-2007 (Algeria) Ghalia Sportif de Chlef GSC
