= Faïza Tsabet =

Algerian volleyball player (born 1985)

Faïza Tsabet (born March 22, 1985, in Chlef) is an Algerian international volleyball player. She played for the national team. She has been part of Algeria's Olympic volleyball team in 2008.

In April 2012, she took part in the 2012 FIVB Grand Prix play-offs, but shortly afterwards she suddenly retired from professional volleyball.

== Club information ==
- Previous club : (Algeria) NR Chlef (2010–2012)
- Previous club : (Spain) CV Tenerife
- Previous club : (France) Istres volleyball (2006–2009)
- Debut club : (Algeria) GS Chlef (1998–2006)
