= Sehryne Hanaoui =

Algerian volleyball player (born 1988)

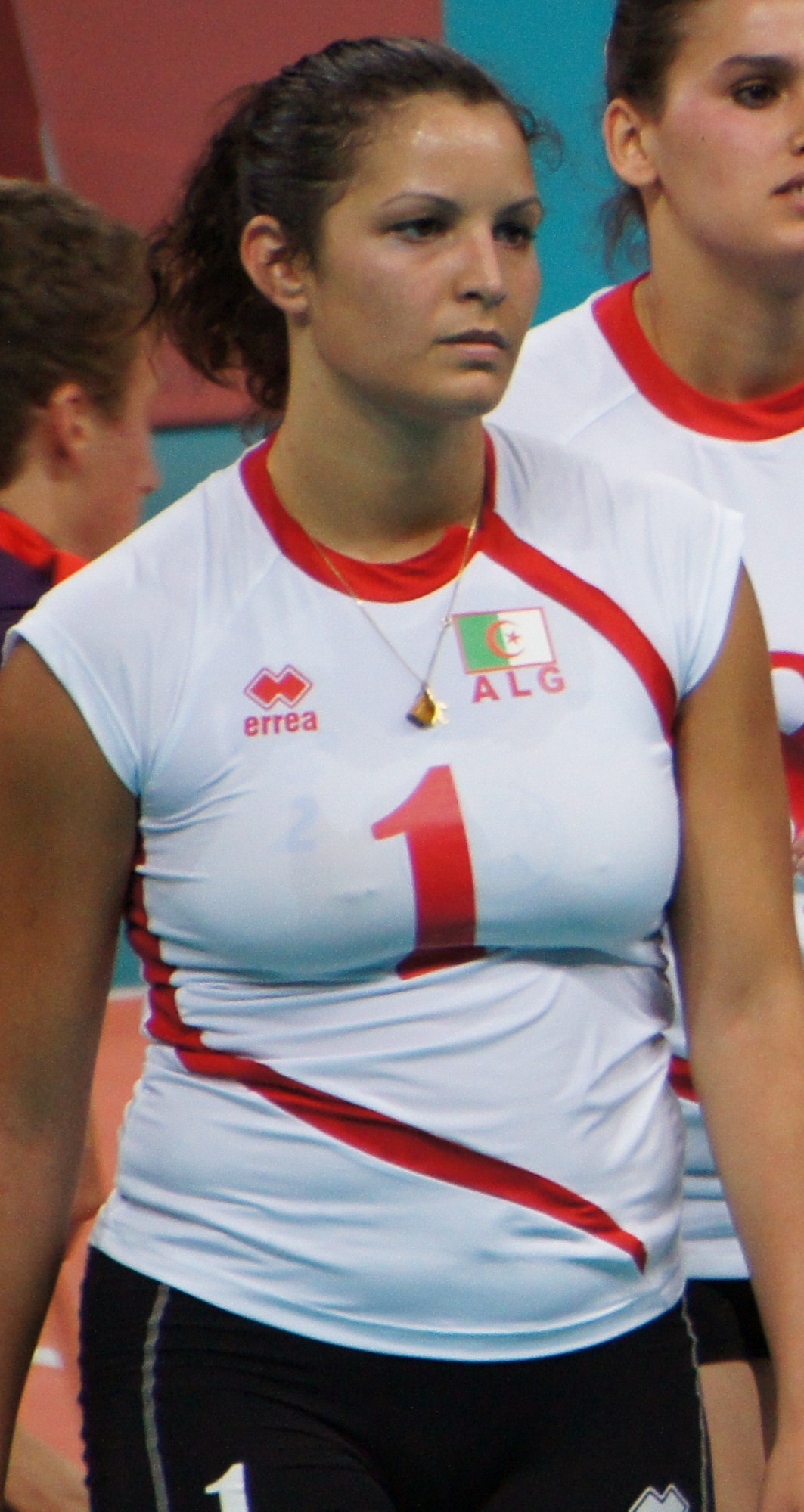
Sehryne Hanaoui in 2012

Sérine Hanaoui (Arabic: سيرين هناوي; born January 10, 1988, in Bouïra) is an Algerian international volleyball player. She represented Algeria at the 2008 and 2012 Summer Olympics. Her mother is a former volleyball player who played for the Algerian national team in the 1970s.

== Club information ==
- Current club : (France) Hainaut
- Previous club : (France) Terville OC
- Previous club : (France) Istres volleyball
- Debut club : (France) Lyon volleyball
