= Mouni Abderrahim =

Algerian volleyball player (born 1985)

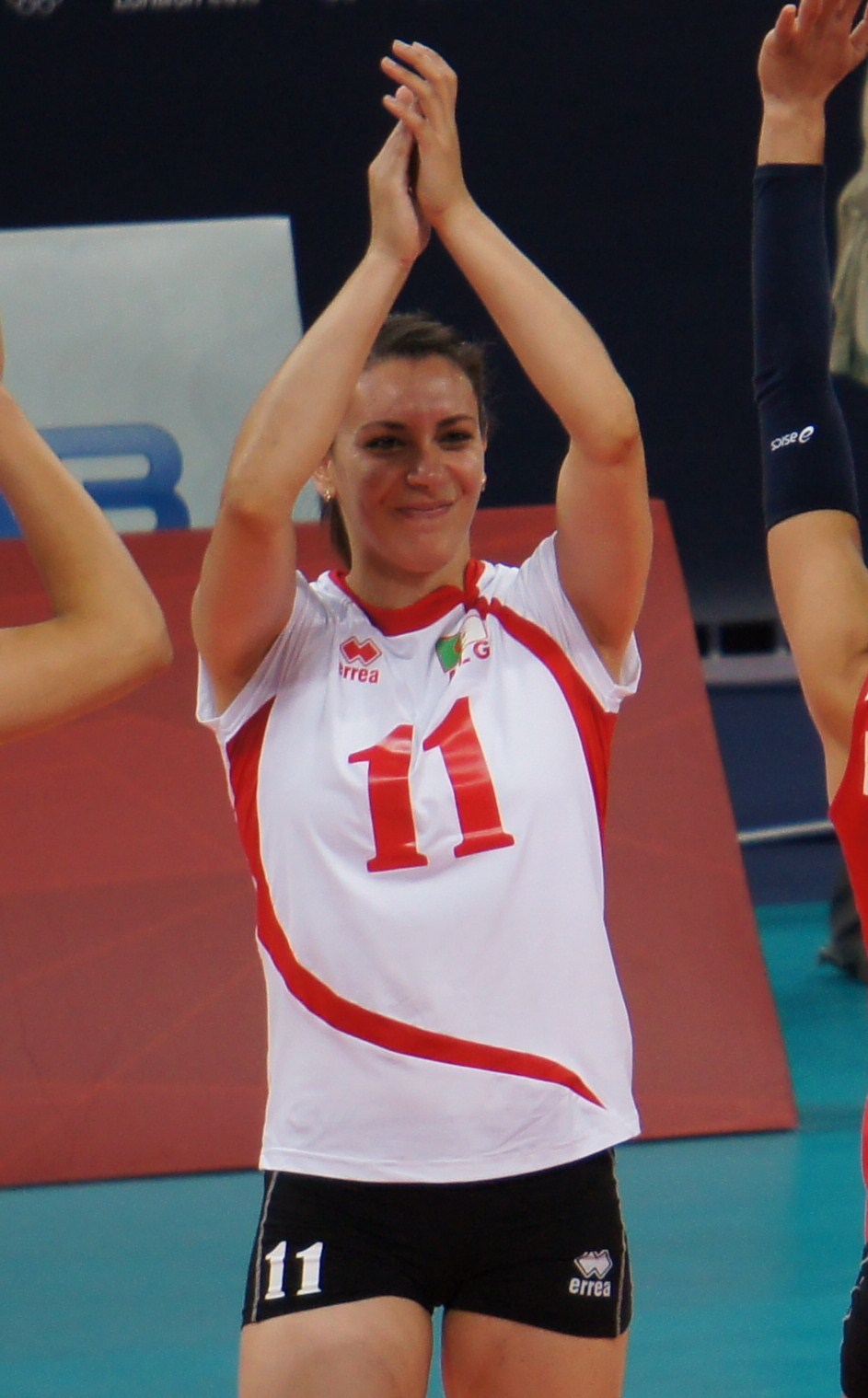
Mouni Abderrahim in 2012

Mouni Abderrahim (born November 19, 1985, in Béjaïa) is an Algerian volleyball player. She has been part of Algeria's Olympic volleyball team twice, in 2008 and 2012.

== Club information ==
- Debut club : (Algeria) ASW Bejaia
- Current club : (Algeria) MB Bejaia
