= Nawal Mansouri =

Algerian volleyball player (born 1985)

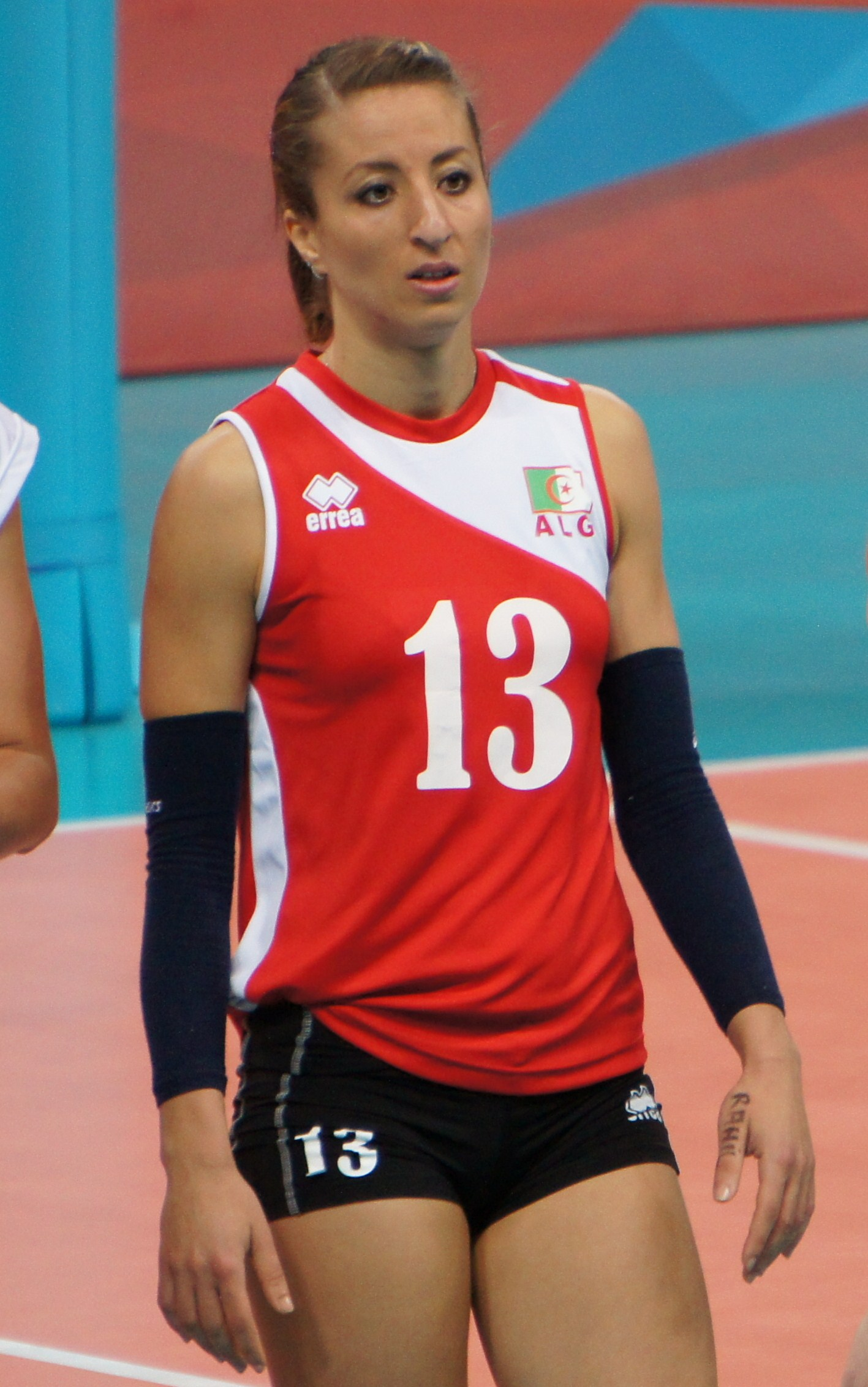
Nawal Mansouri in 2012

Nawel Mansouri (born August 1, 1985, in Béjaïa) is an Algerian international volleyball player at the libero position. She has been part of Algeria's Olympic volleyball team twice, in 2008 and 2012.

== Club information ==
Current club : (Algeria) MB Béjaïa

Current club : (Algeria) GSP (ex MCA)

Debut club : (Algeria) NC Béjaïa
