= Safia Boukhima =

Algerian volleyball player (born 1991)

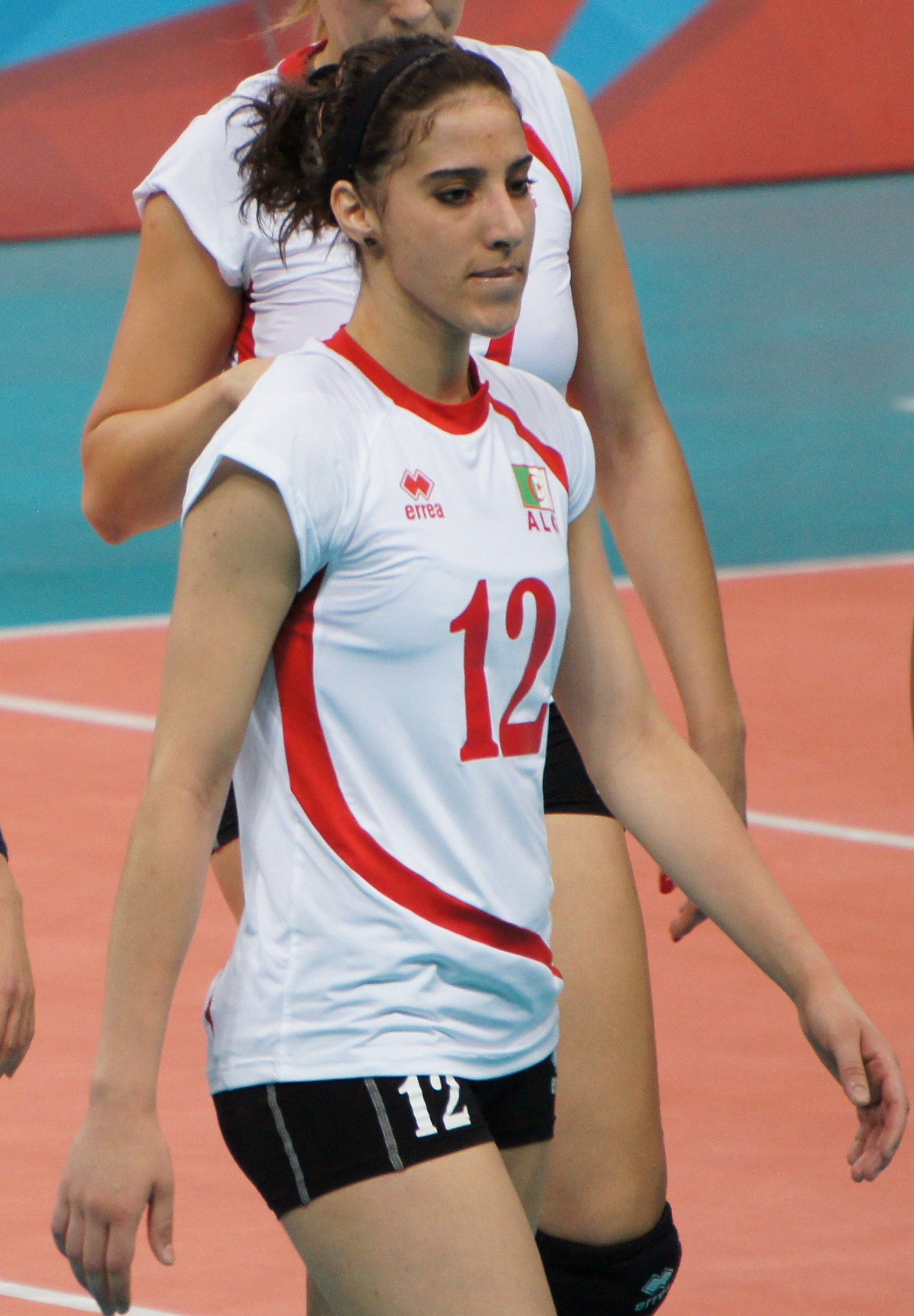
Safia Boukhima in 2012

Safia Boukhima (Arabic: صفية بوخيمة; born 10 January 1991 in Béjaïa) is an Algerian volleyball player. She plays as a wing spiker. She has been part of Algeria's Olympic volleyball team twice, in 2008 and 2012.

== Club information ==
Current club : GSP(ex MCA) (Algeria)

Debut club : ASW Bejaia (Algeria)
