= 2013–14 Algerian Men's Volleyball League =

2013–14 Algerian League
- League: Algerian League
- Sport: Volleyball
- Duration: October 25, 2013 -May 30, 2014 (regular season)
- Teams: 10
- League champions: Nadi Riadhi Bordj Bou Arreridj (2nd title)
- Runners-up: Étoile sportive sétifienne
- Promoted to Nationale Two: Widad Olympique Rouiba & El Fanar Ain Azel
- Relegated to Nationale Two: Widad Olympique Rouiba & Espérance sportive Béthioua

Algerian League seasons
- 2012–13 2014–15

The 2013/14 season of the Algerian Men's Volleyball League was the 52nd annual season of the country's highest volleyball level.

== Members of the Algerian Men's Volleyball League (2013–14 season) ==
Team	Location	Hall	Stadium capacity
MB Bejaia	Béjaïa	Salle CSP Amirouche	
GS Pétroliers MVB	Algiers	Salle Hacène Harcha	8.500
Nadi Riadhi Bordj Bou Arreridj	Bordj Bou Arreridj	Salle OMS Boubiaa Saad	
Étoile sportive sétifienne	Sétif	Salle 8 Mai 1945	
Espérance sportive Béthioua	Bethioua	Salle OMS Benmelouka	
Progrès Olympique Chlef	Chlef	Salle Omnisport Mohamed Nasri	2.500
Association Sportive Ville Blida	Blida	Salle OM Hocine Chalane	3.000
Widad Olympique Rouiba	Rouiba	Salle OMS Rouiba	
Olympique Milien Ketamien	El Milia	Salle OMS EL Meridja	
El Fanar Ain Azel	Ain Azel	Salle OMS Ain Azel	

== Regular season ==
Pos	Team	Pld	W	L	Pts	SW	SL	SR	SPW	SPL	SPR	Qualification or relegation
1	Nadi Riadhi Bordj Bou Arreridj	24	21	3	61	64	18	3.556	1817	1505	1.207	Champions
2	Étoile sportive sétifienne	24	21	3	59	63	23	2.739	1862	1690	1.102	
3	GS Pétroliers MVB	24	16	8	46	53	35	1.514	1790	1669	1.072	
4	MB Bejaia	24	14	10	46	54	36	1.500	1815	1669	1.087	
5	Association Sportive Ville Blida	24	12	12	36	48	43	1.116	1889	1844	1.024	
6	Progrès Olympique Chlef	24	9	15	28	41	54	0.759	1904	1943	0.980	
7	Olympique Milien Ketamien	24	10	14	26	35	51	0.686	1676	1813	0.924	
8	El Fanar Ain Azel	24	8	16	27	37	58	0.638	1854	2035	0.911	
9	Espérance sportive Béthioua	24	7	17	22	32	60	0.533	1877	1991	0.943	Relegated to League 2
10	Widad Olympique Rouiba	24	3	21	12	21	56	0.375	1897	1595	1.189	Relegated to League 2

=== Round 1 ===
Date	Time		Score		Set 1	Set 2	Set 3	Set 4	Set 5	Total	Report
25 oct	16:00	GS Pétroliers	3–0	WO Rouiba	25–17	25–13	25–18	–	–	75–48	Report
25 oct	16:00	MB Bejaia	3–1	ES Béthioua	25–15	16–25	26–24	25–12	–	92–76	Report
25 oct	16:00	ÉS Sétifienne	3–2	EF Ain Azel	25–14	21–25	23–25	25–18	25–9	119–91	Report
25 oct	16:00	NR Bordj Bou Arreridj	3–0	ASV Blida	25–19	25–18	25–15	–	–	75–52	Report
25 oct	16:00	OM Ketamien	–	PO Chlef	–	–	–	–	–	0–0	Report

=== Round 2 ===
Date	Time		Score		Set 1	Set 2	Set 3	Set 4	Set 5	Total	Report
01 nov	16:00	WO Rouiba	–	PO Chlef	–	–	–	–	–	0–0	[ Report]
01 nov	16:00	ASV Blida	–	OM Ketamien	–	–	–	–	–	0–0	[ Report]
01 nov	16:00	ES Béthioua	–	NR Bordj Bou Arreridj	–	–	–	–	–	0–0	[ Report]
01 nov	16:00	EF Ain Azel	–	MB Bejaia	–	–	–	–	–	0–0	[ Report]
01 nov	16:30	GS Pétroliers	–	ÉS Sétifienne	–	–	–	–	–	0–0	[ Report]

=== Round 3 ===
Date	Time		Score		Set 1	Set 2	Set 3	Set 4	Set 5	Total	Report
08 nov	16:00	ÉS Sétifienne	–	WO Rouiba	–	–	–	–	–	0–0	[ Report]
08 nov	16:00	MB Bejaia	–	GS Pétroliers	–	–	–	–	–	0–0	[ Report]
08 nov	16:00	OM Ketamien	–	ES Béthioua	–	–	–	–	–	0–0	[ Report]
08 nov	16:00	NR Bordj Bou Arreridj	–	EF Ain Azel	–	–	–	–	–	0–0	[ Report]
08 nov	16:00	PO Chlef	–	ASV Blida	–	–	–	–	–	0–0	[ Report]

=== Round 4 ===
Date	Time		Score		Set 1	Set 2	Set 3	Set 4	Set 5	Total	Report
12 nov	15:00	WO Rouiba	–	ASV Blida	–	–	–	–	–	0–0	[ Report]
12 nov	15:00	ES Béthioua	–	PO Chlef	–	–	–	–	–	0–0	[ Report]
12 nov	15:00	EF Ain Azel	–	OM Ketamien	–	–	–	–	–	0–0	[ Report]
12 nov	15:00	GS Pétroliers	–	NR Bordj Bou Arreridj	–	–	–	–	–	0–0	[ Report]
12 nov	15:00	ÉS Sétifienne	–	MB Bejaia	–	–	–	–	–	0–0	[ Report]

=== Round 5 ===
Date	Time		Score		Set 1	Set 2	Set 3	Set 4	Set 5	Total	Report
29 nov	16:00	MB Bejaia	–	WO Rouiba	–	–	–	–	–	0–0	[ Report]
29 nov	16:00	NR Bordj Bou Arreridj	–	ÉS Sétifienne	–	–	–	–	–	0–0	[ Report]
29 nov	16:00	OM Ketamien	–	GS Pétroliers	–	–	–	–	–	0–0	[ Report]
29 nov	16:00	PO Chlef	–	EF Ain Azel	–	–	–	–	–	0–0	[ Report]
29 nov	16:00	ASV Blida	–	ES Béthioua	–	–	–	–	–	0–0	[ Report]

=== Round 6 ===
Date	Time		Score		Set 1	Set 2	Set 3	Set 4	Set 5	Total	Report
06 dec	16:00	WO Rouiba	–	ES Béthioua	–	–	–	–	–	0–0	[ Report]
06 dec	16:00	EF Ain Azel	–	ASV Blida	–	–	–	–	–	0–0	[ Report]
06 dec	16:00	GS Pétroliers	–	PO Chlef	–	–	–	–	–	0–0	[ Report]
06 dec	16:00	ÉS Sétifienne	–	OM Ketamien	–	–	–	–	–	0–0	[ Report]
06 dec	16:00	MB Bejaia	–	NR Bordj Bou Arreridj	–	–	–	–	–	0–0	[ Report]

=== Round 7 ===
Date	Time		Score		Set 1	Set 2	Set 3	Set 4	Set 5	Total	Report
20 dec	16:00	NR Bordj Bou Arreridj	–	WO Rouiba	–	–	–	–	–	0–0	[ Report]
20 dec	16:00	OM Ketamien	–	MB Bejaia	–	–	–	–	–	0–0	[ Report]
20 dec	16:00	PO Chlef	–	ÉS Sétifienne	–	–	–	–	–	0–0	[ Report]
20 dec	16:00	ASV Blida	–	GS Pétroliers	–	–	–	–	–	0–0	[ Report]
20 dec	16:00	ES Béthioua	–	EF Ain Azel	–	–	–	–	–	0–0	[ Report]

=== Round 8 ===
Date	Time		Score		Set 1	Set 2	Set 3	Set 4	Set 5	Total	Report
27 dec	16:00	WO Rouiba	–	EF Ain Azel	–	–	–	–	–	0–0	[ Report]
27 dec	16:00	GS Pétroliers	–	ES Béthioua	–	–	–	–	–	0–0	[ Report]
27 dec	16:00	ÉS Sétifienne	–	ASV Blida	–	–	–	–	–	0–0	[ Report]
27 dec	16:00	MB Bejaia	–	PO Chlef	–	–	–	–	–	0–0	[ Report]
27 dec	16:00	NR Bordj Bou Arreridj	–	OM Ketamien	–	–	–	–	–	0–0	[ Report]

=== Round 9 ===
Date	Time		Score		Set 1	Set 2	Set 3	Set 4	Set 5	Total	Report
03 jan	16:00	OM Ketamien	–	WO Rouiba	–	–	–	–	–	0–0	[ Report]
03 jan	16:00	PO Chlef	–	NR Bordj Bou Arreridj	–	–	–	–	–	0–0	[ Report]
03 jan	16:00	ASV Blida	–	MB Bejaia	–	–	–	–	–	0–0	[ Report]
03 jan	16:00	ES Béthioua	–	ÉS Sétifienne	–	–	–	–	–	0–0	[ Report]
03 jan	16:00	EF Ain Azel	–	GS Pétroliers	–	–	–	–	–	0–0	[ Report]

=== Round 10 ===
Date	Time		Score		Set 1	Set 2	Set 3	Set 4	Set 5	Total	Report
	16:00	WO Rouiba	–	GS Pétroliers	–	–	–	–	–	0–0	[ Report]
	16:00	ES Béthioua	–	MB Bejaia	–	–	–	–	–	0–0	[ Report]
	16:00	EF Ain Azel	–	ÉS Sétifienne	–	–	–	–	–	0–0	[ Report]
	16:00	ASV Blida	–	NR Bordj Bou Arreridj	–	–	–	–	–	0–0	[ Report]
	16:00	PO Chlef	–	OM Ketamien	–	–	–	–	–	0–0	[ Report]

=== Round 11 ===
Date	Time		Score		Set 1	Set 2	Set 3	Set 4	Set 5	Total	Report
	16:00	PO Chlef	–	WO Rouiba	–	–	–	–	–	0–0	[ Report]
	16:00	OM Ketamien	–	ASV Blida	–	–	–	–	–	0–0	[ Report]
	16:00	NR Bordj Bou Arreridj	–	ES Béthioua	–	–	–	–	–	0–0	[ Report]
	16:00	MB Bejaia	–	EF Ain Azel	–	–	–	–	–	0–0	[ Report]
	16:00	ÉS Sétifienne	–	GS Pétroliers	–	–	–	–	–	0–0	[ Report]

=== Round 12 ===
Date	Time		Score		Set 1	Set 2	Set 3	Set 4	Set 5	Total	Report
	16:00	WO Rouiba	–	ÉS Sétifienne	–	–	–	–	–	0–0	[ Report]
	16:00	GS Pétroliers	–	MB Bejaia	–	–	–	–	–	0–0	[ Report]
	16:00	ES Béthioua	–	OM Ketamien	–	–	–	–	–	0–0	[ Report]
	16:00	EF Ain Azel	–	NR Bordj Bou Arreridj	–	–	–	–	–	0–0	[ Report]
	16:00	ASV Blida	–	PO Chlef	–	–	–	–	–	0–0	[ Report]

=== Round 13 ===
Date	Time		Score		Set 1	Set 2	Set 3	Set 4	Set 5	Total	Report
	16:00	ASV Blida	–	WO Rouiba	–	–	–	–	–	0–0	[ Report]
	16:00	PO Chlef	–	ES Béthioua	–	–	–	–	–	0–0	[ Report]
	16:00	OM Ketamien	–	EF Ain Azel	–	–	–	–	–	0–0	[ Report]
	16:00	NR Bordj Bou Arreridj	–	GS Pétroliers	–	–	–	–	–	0–0	[ Report]
	16:00	MB Bejaia	–	ÉS Sétifienne	–	–	–	–	–	0–0	[ Report]

=== Round 14 ===
Date	Time		Score		Set 1	Set 2	Set 3	Set 4	Set 5	Total	Report
	16:00	WO Rouiba	–	MB Bejaia	–	–	–	–	–	0–0	[ Report]
	16:00	ÉS Sétifienne	–	NR Bordj Bou Arreridj	–	–	–	–	–	0–0	[ Report]
	16:00	GS Pétroliers	–	OM Ketamien	–	–	–	–	–	0–0	[ Report]
	16:00	EF Ain Azel	–	PO Chlef	–	–	–	–	–	0–0	[ Report]
	16:00	ES Béthioua	–	ASV Blida	–	–	–	–	–	0–0	[ Report]

=== Round 15 ===
Date	Time		Score		Set 1	Set 2	Set 3	Set 4	Set 5	Total	Report
	16:00	ES Béthioua	–	WO Rouiba	–	–	–	–	–	0–0	[ Report]
	16:00	ASV Blida	–	EF Ain Azel	–	–	–	–	–	0–0	[ Report]
	16:00	PO Chlef	–	GS Pétroliers	–	–	–	–	–	0–0	[ Report]
	16:00	OM Ketamien	–	ÉS Sétifienne	–	–	–	–	–	0–0	[ Report]
	16:00	NR Bordj Bou Arreridj	–	MB Bejaia	–	–	–	–	–	0–0	[ Report]

=== Round 16 ===
Date	Time		Score		Set 1	Set 2	Set 3	Set 4	Set 5	Total	Report
	16:00	WO Rouiba	–	NR Bordj Bou Arreridj	–	–	–	–	–	0–0	[ Report]
	16:00	MB Bejaia	–	OM Ketamien	–	–	–	–	–	0–0	[ Report]
	16:00	ÉS Sétifienne	–	PO Chlef	–	–	–	–	–	0–0	[ Report]
	16:00	GS Pétroliers	–	ASV Blida	–	–	–	–	–	0–0	[ Report]
	16:00	EF Ain Azel	–	ES Béthioua	–	–	–	–	–	0–0	[ Report]

=== Round 17 ===
Date	Time		Score		Set 1	Set 2	Set 3	Set 4	Set 5	Total	Report
	16:00	EF Ain Azel	–	WO Rouiba	–	–	–	–	–	0–0	[ Report]
	16:00	ES Béthioua	–	GS Pétroliers	–	–	–	–	–	0–0	[ Report]
	16:00	ASV Blida	–	ÉS Sétifienne	–	–	–	–	–	0–0	[ Report]
	16:00	PO Chlef	–	MB Bejaia	–	–	–	–	–	0–0	[ Report]
	16:00	OM Ketamien	–	NR Bordj Bou Arreridj	–	–	–	–	–	0–0	[ Report]

=== Round 18 ===
Date	Time		Score		Set 1	Set 2	Set 3	Set 4	Set 5	Total	Report
	16:00	WO Rouiba	–	OM Ketamien	–	–	–	–	–	0–0	[ Report]
	16:00	NR Bordj Bou Arreridj	–	PO Chlef	–	–	–	–	–	0–0	[ Report]
	16:00	MB Bejaia	–	ASV Blida	–	–	–	–	–	0–0	[ Report]
	16:00	ÉS Sétifienne	–	ES Béthioua	–	–	–	–	–	0–0	[ Report]
	16:00	GS Pétroliers	–	EF Ain Azel	–	–	–	–	–	0–0	[ Report]
