= 2014–15 Algerian Men's Volleyball League =

2014–15 Algerian League
- League: Algerian League
- Sport: Volleyball
- Duration: September 12, 2014 - January 31, 2015 (regular season); 2015–, 2015 (playoffs)
- Teams: 10
- Promoted to Nationale Two: &
- Relegated to Nationale Two: &

Algerian League seasons
- 2013–14 2015–16

The 2014–15 season of the Algerian Men's Volleyball League was the 53rd annual season of the country's highest volleyball level.

== Members of the Algerian Men's Volleyball League (2014–15 season) ==
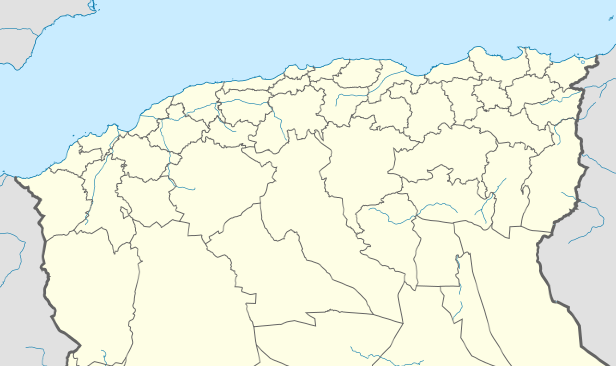
Locations of the 2014–15 AMVL teams in Northern Algeria

Team	Location	Hall	Stadium capacity
MB Bejaia	Béjaïa	Salle CSP Amirouche	
GS Pétroliers MVB	Algiers	Salle Hacène Harcha	8.500
Nadi Riadhi Bordj Bou Arreridj	Bordj Bou Arreridj	Salle OMS Boubiaa Saad	
Étoile sportive sétifienne	Sétif	Salle 8 Mai 1945	
Olympique El Kseur	El-Kseur	Salle CSP Berchiche El-Kseur	
Progrès Olympique Chlef	Chlef	Salle Omnisport Mohamed Nasri	2.500
Association Sportive Ville Blida	Blida	Salle OM Hocine Chalane	3.000
Widad Athlétic Tlemcen	Tlemcen	Salle OPOW Tlemcen	
Olympique Milien Ketamien	El Milia	Salle OMS EL Meridja	
El Fanar Ain Azel	Ain Azel	Salle OMS Ain Azel	

== Regular season ==
Pos	Team	Pld	W	L	Pts	SW	SL	SR	SPW	SPL	SPR	Qualification or relegation
1	Nadi Riadhi Bordj Bou Arreridj	20	18	2	53	57	15	3.800	1729	1395	1.239	Champions
2	Étoile sportive sétifienne	20	18	2	52	57	14	4.071	1679	1520	1.105	
3	GS Pétroliers MVB	20	16	4	46	49	21	2.333	1660	1528	1.086	
4	MB Bejaia	20	13	7	41	44	24	1.833	1574	1424	1.105	
5	Olympique Milien Ketamien	20	12	8	35	40	31	1.290	1605	1531	1.048	
6	El Fanar Ain Azel	20	7	13	22	28	43	0.651	1495	1609	0.929	
7	Association Sportive Ville Blida	20	6	14	18	22	48	0.458	1480	1620	0.914	
8	Progrès Olympique Chlef	20	3	17	12	23	52	0.442	1556	1706	0.912	
9	Olympique El Kseur	20	4	16	11	16	52	0.308	1251	1554	0.805	Relegated to League 2
10	Widad Athlétic Tlemcen	20	3	17	10	17	53	0.321	1309	1593	0.822	Relegated to League 2

=== Round 1 ===
Date	Time		Score		Set 1	Set 2	Set 3	Set 4	Set 5	Total	Report
12 Sep	16:00	Nadi Riadhi Bordj Bou Arreridj	3–0	Olympique El Kseur	25–18	25–11	25–13	–	–	75–42	Report
12 Sep	17:00	Étoile sportive sétifienne	3–2	Widad Athlétic Tlemcen	25–23	24–26	25–21	24–26	15–10	113–106	Report
12 Sep	16:00	Mechâal Baladiat Béjaïa	3–1	Progrès Olympique Chlef	25–22	25–18	20–25	25–20	–	95–85	Report
12 Sep	16:30	GS Pétroliers MVB	0–3	Olympique Milien Ketamien	22–25	21–25	19–25	–	–	62–75	Report
12 Sep	16:00	Association Sportive Ville Blida	3–0	El Fanar Ain Azel	25–14	25–20	25–22	–	–	75–56	Report

=== Round 2 ===
Date	Time		Score		Set 1	Set 2	Set 3	Set 4	Set 5	Total	Report
19 Sep	16:00	Olympique El Kseur	0–3	El Fanar Ain Azel	20–25	16–25	20–25	–	–	56–75	Report
19 Sep	16:00	Olympique Milien Ketamien	3–0	Association Sportive Ville Blida	25–23	25–16	28–26	–	–	78–65	Report
19 Sep	16:00	Progrès Olympique Chlef	2–3	GS Pétroliers MVB	21–25	25–18	25–27	25–23	16–18	112–111	Report
19 Sep	17:00	Widad Athlétic Tlemcen	0–3	Mechâal Baladiat Béjaïa	14–25	19–25	18–25	–	–	51–75	Report
19 Sep	16:00	Nadi Riadhi Bordj Bou Arreridj	3–2	Étoile sportive sétifienne	23–25	20–25	25–20	25–19	24–22	117–111	Report

=== Round 3 ===
Date	Time		Score		Set 1	Set 2	Set 3	Set 4	Set 5	Total	Report
26 Sep	17:00	Étoile sportive sétifienne	3–0	Olympique El Kseur	25–20	25–14	25–13	–	–	75–47	Report
26 Sep	16:00	Mechâal Baladiat Béjaïa	0–3	Nadi Riadhi Bordj Bou Arreridj	25–27	22–25	20–25	–	–	67–77	Report
26 Sep	16:30	GS Pétroliers MVB	3–0	Widad Athlétic Tlemcen	25–14	25–16	25–18	–	–	75–48	Report
26 Sep	16:00	Association Sportive Ville Blida	3–1	Progrès Olympique Chlef	15–25	25–21	25–19	25–21	–	90–86	Report
26 Sep	16:00	El Fanar Ain Azel	1–3	Olympique Milien Ketamien	25–14	25–16	25–18	–	–	75–48	Report

=== Round 4 ===
Date	Time		Score		Set 1	Set 2	Set 3	Set 4	Set 5	Total	Report
02 Oct	14:00	Olympique El Kseur	0–3	Olympique Milien Ketamien	19–25	20–25	16–25	–	–	55–75	Report
02 Oct	14:00	Progrès Olympique Chlef	1–3	El Fanar Ain Azel	25–22	20–25	21–25	23–25	–	89–97	Report
02 Oct	14:00	Widad Athlétic Tlemcen	3–0	Association Sportive Ville Blida	25–21	28–26	25–15	–	–	78–62	Report
02 Oct	14:00	Nadi Riadhi Bordj Bou Arreridj	3–1	GS Pétroliers MVB	20–25	25–15	25–19	25–15	–	95–74	Report
02 Oct	14:00	Étoile sportive sétifienne	3–1	Mechâal Baladiat Béjaïa	26–24	25–20	22–25	25–17	–	98–86	Report

=== Round 5 ===
Date	Time		Score		Set 1	Set 2	Set 3	Set 4	Set 5	Total	Report
10 Oct	16:00	Mechâal Baladiat Béjaïa	3–0	Olympique El Kseur	25–20	25–19	25–13	–	–	75–52	Report
10 Oct	16:30	GS Pétroliers MVB	0–3	Étoile sportive sétifienne	27–29	29–31	22–25	–	–	78–85	Report
10 Oct	16:00	Association Sportive Ville Blida	0–3	Nadi Riadhi Bordj Bou Arreridj	18–25	19–25	12–25	–	–	49–75	Report
10 Oct	16:00	El Fanar Ain Azel	3–1	Widad Athlétic Tlemcen	25–22	25–21	18–25	25–18	–	93–86	Report
10 Oct	16:00	Olympique Milien Ketamien	3–0	Progrès Olympique Chlef	25–23	25–19	25–21	–	–	75–63	Report

=== Round 6 ===
Date	Time		Score		Set 1	Set 2	Set 3	Set 4	Set 5	Total	Report
17 Oct	16:00	Olympique El Kseur	3–2	Progrès Olympique Chlef	25–19	17–25	19–25	25–19	15–13	101–101	Report
17 Oct	17:00	Widad Athlétic Tlemcen	3–2	Olympique Milien Ketamien	25–22	25–21	21–25	23–25	15–10	109–103	Report
17 Oct	16:00	Nadi Riadhi Bordj Bou Arreridj	3–0	El Fanar Ain Azel	25–19	25–19	25–16	–	–	75–54	Report
17 Oct	17:00	Étoile sportive sétifienne	3–0	Association Sportive Ville Blida	25–18	30–28	25–19	–	–	80–65	Report
17 Oct	16:00	Mechâal Baladiat Béjaïa	2–3	GS Pétroliers MVB	25–15	21–25	25–21	23–25	11–15	105–101	Report

=== Round 7 ===
Date	Time		Score		Set 1	Set 2	Set 3	Set 4	Set 5	Total	Report
01 Nov	16:30	GS Pétroliers MVB	3–0	Olympique El Kseur	25–13	26–24	25–15	–	–	76–52	Report
01 Nov	16:00	El Fanar Ain Azel	0–3	Étoile sportive sétifienne	19–25	16–25	21–25	–	–	56–75	Report
01 Nov	16:00	Olympique Milien Ketamien	1–3	Nadi Riadhi Bordj Bou Arreridj	25–16	18–25	21–25	23–25	–	87–91	Report
03 Nov	16:00	Association Sportive Ville Blida	0–3	Mechâal Baladiat Béjaïa	23–25	13–25	15–25	–	–	51–75	Report
21 Nov	16:00	Progrès Olympique Chlef	3–1	Widad Athlétic Tlemcen	19–25	25–22	25–21	25–21	–	94–89	Report

=== Round 8 ===
Date	Time		Score		Set 1	Set 2	Set 3	Set 4	Set 5	Total	Report
12 Dec	16:00	Olympique El Kseur	3–0	Widad Athlétic Tlemcen	25–20	25–17	25–17	–	–	75–54	Report
12 Dec	16:00	Nadi Riadhi Bordj Bou Arreridj	3–0	Progrès Olympique Chlef	25–15	25–20	25–14	–	–	75–49	Report
12 Dec	17:00	Étoile sportive sétifienne	3–0	Olympique Milien Ketamien	28–26	25–22	25–19	–	–	78–67	Report
12 Dec	16:00	Mechâal Baladiat Béjaïa	3–0	El Fanar Ain Azel	25–11	25–21	25–19	–	–	75–51	Report
12 Dec	16:30	GS Pétroliers MVB	3–1	Association Sportive Ville Blida	21–25	25–18	25–22	25–23	–	96–88	Report

=== Round 9 ===
Date	Time		Score		Set 1	Set 2	Set 3	Set 4	Set 5	Total	Report
19 Dec	16:00	Association Sportive Ville Blida	3–1	Olympique El Kseur	25–18	25–22	19–25	25–21	–	94–86	Report
19 Dec	16:00	El Fanar Ain Azel	1–3	GS Pétroliers MVB	25–20	20–25	14–25	23–25	–	82–95	Report
19 Dec	16:00	Olympique Milien Ketamien	3–2	Mechâal Baladiat Béjaïa	21–25	25–22	23–25	25–23	14–25	108–120	Report
19 Dec	16:00	Progrès Olympique Chlef	1–3	Étoile sportive sétifienne	21–25	25–23	20–25	14–25	–	80–98	Report
19 Dec	17:00	Widad Athlétic Tlemcen	0–3	Nadi Riadhi Bordj Bou Arreridj	17–25	20–25	17–25	–	–	54–75	Report

=== Round 10 ===
Date	Time		Score		Set 1	Set 2	Set 3	Set 4	Set 5	Total	Report
26 Dec	16:00	Olympique El Kseur	2–3	Nadi Riadhi Bordj Bou Arreridj	26–28	13–25	29–27	25–19	4–15	97–114	Report
26 Dec	17:00	Widad Athlétic Tlemcen	2–3	Étoile sportive sétifienne	23–25	28–26	18–25	25–22	5–15	99–113	Report
26 Dec	16:00	Progrès Olympique Chlef	1–3	Mechâal Baladiat Béjaïa	25–18	22–25	11–25	20–25	–	78–93	Report
26 Dec	16:00	Olympique Milien Ketamien	0–3	GS Pétroliers MVB	25–27	17–25	19–25	–	–	61–77	Report
26 Dec	16:00	El Fanar Ain Azel	3–0	Association Sportive Ville Blida	25–20	25–21	25–20	–	–	75–61	Report

=== Round 11 ===
Date	Time		Score		Set 1	Set 2	Set 3	Set 4	Set 5	Total	Report
02 Jan	16:00	El Fanar Ain Azel	3–0	Olympique El Kseur	25–16	25–20	25–19	–	–	75–55	Report
02 Jan	16:00	Association Sportive Ville Blida	2–3	Olympique Milien Ketamien	25–21	15–25	17–25	25–21	12–15	94–107	Report
02 Jan	16:30	GS Pétroliers MVB	3–0	Progrès Olympique Chlef	25–16	26–24	25–14	–	–	76–54	Report
02 Jan	16:00	Mechâal Baladiat Béjaïa	3–0	Widad Athlétic Tlemcen	25–12	25–20	25–20	–	–	75–52	Report
02 Jan	17:00	Étoile sportive sétifienne	3–2	Nadi Riadhi Bordj Bou Arreridj	25–23	26–24	24–26	21–25	22–20	118–118	Report

=== Round 12 ===
Date	Time		Score		Set 1	Set 2	Set 3	Set 4	Set 5	Total	Report
09 Jan	16:00	Olympique El Kseur	–	Étoile sportive sétifienne	–	–	–	–	–	0–0	[ Report]
09 Jan	16:00	Nadi Riadhi Bordj Bou Arreridj	–	Mechâal Baladiat Béjaïa	–	–	–	–	–	0–0	[ Report]
09 Jan	17:00	Widad Athlétic Tlemcen	–	GS Pétroliers MVB	–	–	–	–	–	0–0	[ Report]
09 Jan	16:00	Progrès Olympique Chlef	–	Association Sportive Ville Blida	–	–	–	–	–	0–0	[ Report]
09 Jan	16:00	Olympique Milien Ketamien	–	El Fanar Ain Azel	–	–	–	–	–	0–0	[ Report]

=== Round 13 ===
Date	Time		Score		Set 1	Set 2	Set 3	Set 4	Set 5	Total	Report
23 jan	16:00	GS Pétroliers MVB	3–1	Nadi Riadhi Bordj Bou Arreridj	25–14	25–20	24–26	25–18	–	99–78	Report
24 jan	14:00	Olympique Milien Ketamien	3–0	Olympique El Kseur	25–17	25–11	25–20	–	–	75–48	Report
24 jan	14:00	El Fanar Ain Azel	1–3	Progrès Olympique Chlef	23–25	25–21	19–25	24–26	–	91–97	Report
24 jan	14:00	Association Sportive Ville Blida	3–1	Widad Athlétic Tlemcen	25–22	21–25	25–17	27–25	–	98–89	Report
24 jan	14:00	Mechâal Baladiat Béjaïa	0–3	Étoile sportive sétifienne	23–25	18–25	19–25	–	–	60–75	Report

=== Round 14 ===
Date	Time		Score		Set 1	Set 2	Set 3	Set 4	Set 5	Total	Report
06 feb	16:00	Olympique El Kseur	0–3	Mechâal Baladiat Béjaïa	16–25	16–25	21–25	–	–	53–75	Report
06 feb	17:00	Étoile sportive sétifienne	3–0	GS Pétroliers MVB	25–20	25–20	25–23	–	–	75–63	Report
06 feb	16:00	Nadi Riadhi Bordj Bou Arreridj	3–0	Association Sportive Ville Blida	25–22	25–16	25–18	–	–	75–56	Report
06 feb	17:00	Widad Athlétic Tlemcen	1–3	El Fanar Ain Azel	19–25	22–25	25–17	18–25	–	84–92	Report
06 feb	16:00	Progrès Olympique Chlef	0–3	Olympique Milien Ketamien	24–26	23–25	23–25	–	–	70–76	Report

=== Round 15 ===
Date	Time		Score		Set 1	Set 2	Set 3	Set 4	Set 5	Total	Report
13 feb	16:00	Progrès Olympique Chlef	–	Olympique El Kseur	–	–	–	–	–	0–0	[ Report]
13 feb	16:00	Olympique Milien Ketamien	–	Widad Athlétic Tlemcen	–	–	–	–	–	0–0	[ Report]
13 feb	16:00	El Fanar Ain Azel	–	Nadi Riadhi Bordj Bou Arreridj	–	–	–	–	–	0–0	[ Report]
13 feb	16:00	Association Sportive Ville Blida	–	Étoile sportive sétifienne	–	–	–	–	–	0–0	[ Report]
13 feb	16:30	GS Pétroliers MVB	–	Mechâal Baladiat Béjaïa	–	–	–	–	–	0–0	[ Report]

=== Round 16 ===
Date	Time		Score		Set 1	Set 2	Set 3	Set 4	Set 5	Total	Report
20 feb	16:00	Olympique El Kseur	–	GS Pétroliers MVB	–	–	–	–	–	0–0	[ Report]
20 feb	16:00	Mechâal Baladiat Béjaïa	–	Association Sportive Ville Blida	–	–	–	–	–	0–0	[ Report]
20 feb	17:00	Étoile sportive sétifienne	–	El Fanar Ain Azel	–	–	–	–	–	0–0	[ Report]
20 feb	16:00	Nadi Riadhi Bordj Bou Arreridj	–	Olympique Milien Ketamien	–	–	–	–	–	0–0	[ Report]
20 feb	17:00	Widad Athlétic Tlemcen	–	Progrès Olympique Chlef	–	–	–	–	–	0–0	[ Report]

=== Round 17 ===
Date	Time	Score	Set 1	Set 2	Set 3	Set 4	Set 5	Total	Report
	10:00	–	–	–	–	–	–	0–0	[ Report]
	10:00	–	–	–	–	–	–	0–0	[ Report]
	10:00	–	–	–	–	–	–	0–0	[ Report]
	10:00	–	–	–	–	–	–	0–0	[ Report]
	10:00	–	–	–	–	–	–	0–0	[ Report]

=== Round 18 ===
Date	Time	Score	Set 1	Set 2	Set 3	Set 4	Set 5	Total	Report
	10:00	–	–	–	–	–	–	0–0	[ Report]
	10:00	–	–	–	–	–	–	0–0	[ Report]
	10:00	–	–	–	–	–	–	0–0	[ Report]
	10:00	–	–	–	–	–	–	0–0	[ Report]
	10:00	–	–	–	–	–	–	0–0	[ Report]
