= 2015–16 Algerian Men's Volleyball League =

2015–16 Algerian League
- League: Algerian League
- Sport: Volleyball
- Duration: December 22, 2015 – April 4, 2016 (regular season); 2015–, 2015 (playoffs)
- Teams: 16
- Promoted to Nationale Two: &
- Relegated to Nationale Two: &

Algerian League seasons
- 2014–15 2016–17

The 2015–16 season of the Algerian Men's Volleyball League was the 54th annual season of the country's highest volleyball level.

== Members of the Algerian Men's Volleyball League (2015–16 season) ==
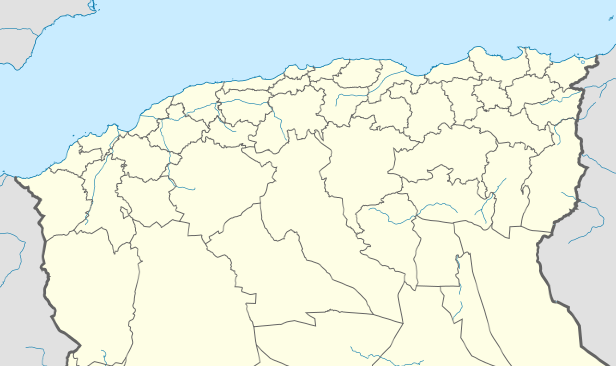
Locations of the 2015–16 AMVL teams in Northern Algeria

| Team | Location | Hall | Stadium capacity |
|---|---|---|---|
| Mechâal Baladiat Béjaïa | Béjaïa | Salle CSP Amirouche | |
| GS Pétroliers MVB | Algiers | Salle Hacène Harcha | 8.500 |
| Nadi Riadhi Bordj Bou Arréridj | Bordj Bou Arréridj | Salle OMS Boubiaa Saad | |
| Étoile sportive sétifienne | Sétif | Salle 8 Mai 1945 | |
| Olympique El Kseur | El Kseur | Salle CSP Berchiche El-Kseur | |
| Progrès Olympique Chlef | Chlef | Salle Omnisport Mohamed Nasri | 2.500 |
| Olympique Milien Ketamien | El Milia | Salle OMS EL Meridja | |
| El Fanar Aïn Azel | Aïn Azel | Salle OMS Aïn Azel | |
| Association Sportive Ville Blida | Blida | Salle OM Hocine Chalane | 3.000 |
| Widad Athlétic Tlemcen | Tlemcen | Salle OPOW Tlemcen | |
| Raed Chabab M'sila | M'sila | Salle OMS Maayouf Salem | |
| Widad Olympique Rouïba | Rouïba | Salle OMS Rouïba | |
| IBM Chaanba | Chaanba | Salle OMS Metlili Chaanba | |
| Nacéria Club Béjaïa | Béjaïa | Salle Bleu Béjaïa | |
| MCB Laghouat | Laghouat | Salle DADA YOUNES | |
| ITR Sétif | Sétif | Salle OMS 1006 | |

== Regular season E ==
| Pos | Team | Pld | W | L | Pts | SW | SL | SR | SPW | SPL | SPR | Qualification or relegation |
|---|---|---|---|---|---|---|---|---|---|---|---|---|
| 1 | GS Pétroliers MVB | 13 | 13 | 0 | 36 | 39 | 9 | 4.333 | 1145 | 959 | 1.194 | Champions |
| 2 | Mechâal Baladiat Béjaïa | 11 | 9 | 2 | 27 | 35 | 20 | 1.750 | 1255 | 1093 | 1.148 | |
| 3 | Étoile sportive sétifienne | 13 | 9 | 4 | 25 | 32 | 24 | 1.333 | 1261 | 1117 | 1.129 | |
| 4 | El Fanar Aïn Azel | 13 | 7 | 6 | 19 | 24 | 25 | 0.960 | 1001 | 1115 | 0.898 | |
| 5 | Nadi Riadhi Bordj Bou Arréridj | 13 | 6 | 7 | 19 | 28 | 30 | 0.933 | 1234 | 1214 | 1.016 | |
| 6 | Olympique Milien Ketamien | 13 | 5 | 8 | 13 | 21 | 29 | 0.724 | 1033 | 1177 | 0.878 | |
| 7 | Progrès Olympique Chlef | 13 | 2 | 11 | 12 | 20 | 34 | 0.588 | 1153 | 1191 | 0.968 | |
| 8 | Olympique El Kseur | 13 | 1 | 12 | 3 | 8 | 34 | 0.235 | 1856 | 1092 | 1.700 | Relegated to League 2 |

=== Round 1 ===
| Date | Time | | Score | | Set 1 | Set 2 | Set 3 | Set 4 | Set 5 | Total | Report |
|---|---|---|---|---|---|---|---|---|---|---|---|
| 22 Dec | 16:00 | Progrès Olympique Chlef | 0–3 | GS Pétroliers MVB | 24–26 | 22–25 | 15–25 | – | – | 61–76 | Report |
| 22 Dec | 16:00 | MB Béjaïa | 3–1 | Olympique Milien Ketamien | 24–26 | 25–15 | 25–21 | 25–17 | – | 99–79 | Report |
| 22 Dec | 16:00 | El Fanar Aïn Azel | 1–3 | Étoile sportive sétifienne | 17–25 | 25–23 | 23–25 | 19–25 | – | 84–98 | Report |
| 22 Dec | 17:00 | Nadi Riadhi Bordj Bou Arréridj | 3–0 | Olympique El Kseur | 25–15 | 25–19 | 25–19 | – | – | 75–53 | Report |

=== Round 2 ===
| Date | Time | | Score | | Set 1 | Set 2 | Set 3 | Set 4 | Set 5 | Total | Report |
|---|---|---|---|---|---|---|---|---|---|---|---|
| 19 Jan | 17:00 | Olympique Milien Ketamien | 3–0 | El Fanar Aïn Azel | 25–22 | 25–19 | 25–17 | – | – | 75–58 | Report |
| 19 Jan | 16:00 | Progrès Olympique Chlef | 2–3 | MB Béjaïa | 20–25 | 25–21 | 26–24 | 18–25 | 12–15 | 101–110 | Report |
| 19 Jan | 16:00 | Étoile sportive sétifienne | 3–2 | Nadi Riadhi Bordj Bou Arréridj | 13–25 | 25–21 | 25–19 | 16–25 | 15–9 | 94–99 | Report |
| 19 Jan | 16:30 | GS Pétroliers MVB | 3–0 | Olympique El Kseur | 25–17 | 25–11 | 25–19 | – | – | 75–47 | Report |

=== Round 3 ===
| Date | Time | | Score | | Set 1 | Set 2 | Set 3 | Set 4 | Set 5 | Total | Report |
|---|---|---|---|---|---|---|---|---|---|---|---|
| 22 Jan | 16:00 | MB Béjaïa | 2–3 | GS Pétroliers MVB | 17–25 | 24–26 | 25–23 | 25–21 | 9–15 | 100–110 | Report |
| 22 Jan | 16:00 | El Fanar Aïn Azel | 3–0 | Progrès Olympique Chlef | – | – | – | – | – | 0–0 | Report |
| 22 Jan | 17:00 | Nadi Riadhi Bordj Bou Arréridj | 3–1 | Olympique Milien Ketamien | 25–18 | 18–25 | 25–22 | 32–30 | – | 100–95 | Report |
| 22 Jan | 16:00 | Olympique El Kseur | 1–3 | Étoile sportive sétifienne | 22–25 | 25–21 | 17–25 | 20–25 | – | 84–96 | Report |

=== Round 4 ===
| Date | Time | | Score | | Set 1 | Set 2 | Set 3 | Set 4 | Set 5 | Total | Report |
|---|---|---|---|---|---|---|---|---|---|---|---|
| 29 Jan | 17:00 | GS Pétroliers MVB | 3–0 | Étoile sportive sétifienne | 25–18 | 31–29 | 25–19 | – | – | 81–66 | Report |
| 29 Jan | 16:00 | Olympique Milien Ketamien | 3–1 | Olympique El Kseur | 24–26 | 25–20 | 25–17 | 25–19 | – | 99–82 | Report |
| 29 Jan | 16:00 | Progrès Olympique Chlef | 1–3 | Nadi Riadhi Bordj Bou Arréridj | 36–34 | 18–25 | 24–26 | 20–25 | – | 98–110 | Report |
| 29 Jan | 16:00 | MB Béjaïa | 2–3 | El Fanar Aïn Azel | 25–20 | 25–17 | 21–25 | 21–25 | 10–15 | 102–102 | Report |

=== Round 5 ===
| Date | Time | | Score | | Set 1 | Set 2 | Set 3 | Set 4 | Set 5 | Total | Report |
|---|---|---|---|---|---|---|---|---|---|---|---|
| 6 Feb | 10:00 | El Fanar Aïn Azel | – | GS Pétroliers MVB | – | – | – | – | – | 0–0 | [ Report] |
| 6 Feb | 10:00 | Nadi Riadhi Bordj Bou Arréridj | – | MB Béjaïa | – | – | – | – | – | 0–0 | [ Report] |
| 6 Feb | 10:00 | Olympique El Kseur | – | Progrès Olympique Chlef | – | – | – | – | – | 0–0 | [ Report] |
| 6 Feb | 10:00 | Étoile sportive sétifienne | – | Olympique Milien Ketamien | – | – | – | – | – | 0–0 | [ Report] |

=== Round 6 ===
| Date | Time | | Score | | Set 1 | Set 2 | Set 3 | Set 4 | Set 5 | Total | Report |
|---|---|---|---|---|---|---|---|---|---|---|---|
| 13 Feb | 10:00 | GS Pétroliers MVB | – | Olympique Milien Ketamien | – | – | – | – | – | 0–0 | [ Report] |
| 13 Feb | 10:00 | Progrès Olympique Chlef | – | Étoile sportive sétifienne | – | – | – | – | – | 0–0 | [ Report] |
| 13 Feb | 10:00 | MB Béjaïa | – | Olympique El Kseur | – | – | – | – | – | 0–0 | [ Report] |
| 13 Feb | 10:00 | El Fanar Aïn Azel | – | Nadi Riadhi Bordj Bou Arréridj | – | – | – | – | – | 0–0 | [ Report] |

=== Round 7 ===
| Date | Time | | Score | | Set 1 | Set 2 | Set 3 | Set 4 | Set 5 | Total | Report |
|---|---|---|---|---|---|---|---|---|---|---|---|
| 20 Feb | 10:00 | Nadi Riadhi Bordj Bou Arréridj | – | GS Pétroliers MVB | – | – | – | – | – | 0–0 | [ Report] |
| 20 Feb | 10:00 | Olympique El Kseur | – | El Fanar Aïn Azel | – | – | – | – | – | 0–0 | [ Report] |
| 20 Feb | 10:00 | Étoile sportive sétifienne | – | MB Béjaïa | – | – | – | – | – | 0–0 | [ Report] |
| 20 Feb | 10:00 | Olympique Milien Ketamien | – | Progrès Olympique Chlef | – | – | – | – | – | 0–0 | [ Report] |

=== Round 8 ===
| Date | Time | | Score | | Set 1 | Set 2 | Set 3 | Set 4 | Set 5 | Total | Report |
|---|---|---|---|---|---|---|---|---|---|---|---|
| 4 Mar | 16:00 | Olympique El Kseur | – | Nadi Riadhi Bordj Bou Arréridj | – | – | – | – | – | 0–0 | [ Report] |
| 4 Mar | 17:30 | Étoile sportive sétifienne | – | El Fanar Aïn Azel | – | – | – | – | – | 0–0 | [ Report] |
| 4 Mar | 16:00 | Olympique Milien Ketamien | – | MB Béjaïa | – | – | – | – | – | 0–0 | [ Report] |
| 4 Mar | 17:00 | GS Pétroliers MVB | – | Progrès Olympique Chlef | – | – | – | – | – | 0–0 | [ Report] |

=== Round 9 ===
| Date | Time | | Score | | Set 1 | Set 2 | Set 3 | Set 4 | Set 5 | Total | Report |
|---|---|---|---|---|---|---|---|---|---|---|---|
| 11 Mar | 16:00 | El Fanar Aïn Azel | 3–1 | Olympique Milien Ketamien | 19–25 | 18–25 | 12–25 | – | – | 49–75 | Report |
| 11 Mar | 17:00 | MB Béjaïa | 3–2 | Progrès Olympique Chlef | 25–27 | 25–22 | 23–25 | 25–23 | 26–24 | 124–121 | Report |
| 11 Mar | 17:00 | Nadi Riadhi Bordj Bou Arréridj | 3–1 | Étoile sportive sétifienne | 25–27 | 25–22 | 25–23 | 25–23 | 26–24 | 126–119 | Report |
| 11 Mar | 16:00 | Olympique El Kseur | 0–3 | GS Pétroliers MVB | 25–20 | 22–25 | 21–25 | 25–18 | 15–13 | 108–101 | Report |

=== Round 10 ===
| Date | Time | | Score | | Set 1 | Set 2 | Set 3 | Set 4 | Set 5 | Total | Report |
|---|---|---|---|---|---|---|---|---|---|---|---|
| 18 Mar | 17:00 | GS Pétroliers MVB | 3–2 | MB Béjaïa | 26–24 | 19–25 | 24–26 | 25–21 | 15–13 | 109–109 | Report |
| 18 Mar | 16:00 | Progrès Olympique Chlef | 1–3 | El Fanar Aïn Azel | 26–28 | 21–25 | 27–25 | 27–29 | – | 101–107 | Report |
| 18 Mar | 16:00 | Olympique Milien Ketamien | 1–3 | Nadi Riadhi Bordj Bou Arréridj | 25–21 | 24–26 | 18–25 | 25–27 | – | 92–99 | Report |
| 18 Mar | 16:00 | Étoile sportive sétifienne | 3–1 | Olympique El Kseur | 28–26 | 22–25 | 25–19 | 25–18 | – | 100–88 | Report |

=== Round 11 ===
| Date | Time | | Score | | Set 1 | Set 2 | Set 3 | Set 4 | Set 5 | Total | Report |
|---|---|---|---|---|---|---|---|---|---|---|---|
| 26 Mar | 10:00 | Étoile sportive sétifienne | – | GS Pétroliers MVB | – | – | – | – | – | 0–0 | [ Report] |
| 26 Mar | 10:00 | Olympique El Kseur | – | Olympique Milien Ketamien | – | – | – | – | – | 0–0 | [ Report] |
| 26 Mar | 10:00 | Nadi Riadhi Bordj Bou Arréridj | – | Progrès Olympique Chlef | – | – | – | – | – | 0–0 | [ Report] |
| 26 Mar | 10:00 | El Fanar Aïn Azel | – | MB Béjaïa | – | – | – | – | – | 0–0 | [ Report] |

=== Round 12 ===
| Date | Time | | Score | | Set 1 | Set 2 | Set 3 | Set 4 | Set 5 | Total | Report |
|---|---|---|---|---|---|---|---|---|---|---|---|
| 12 Apr | 17:00 | GS Pétroliers MVB | 3–1 | El Fanar Aïn Azel | 25–22 | 25–17 | 20–25 | 25–16 | – | 95–80 | Report |
| 12 Apr | 16:00 | MB Béjaïa | 3–1 | Nadi Riadhi Bordj Bou Arréridj | 28–26 | 24–26 | 25–18 | 25–14 | – | 102–84 | Report |
| 12 Apr | 16:00 | Progrès Olympique Chlef | 3–1 | Olympique El Kseur | 25–22 | 25–15 | 23–25 | 25–20 | – | 98–82 | Report |
| 12 Apr | 16:00 | Olympique Milien Ketamien | 1–3 | Étoile sportive sétifienne | 27–29 | 21–25 | 25–23 | 27–29 | – | 100–106 | Report |

=== Round 13 ===
| Date | Time | | Score | | Set 1 | Set 2 | Set 3 | Set 4 | Set 5 | Total | Report |
|---|---|---|---|---|---|---|---|---|---|---|---|
| 2 Apr | 10:00 | Olympique Milien Ketamien | – | GS Pétroliers MVB | – | – | – | – | – | 0–0 | [ Report] |
| 2 Apr | 10:00 | Étoile sportive sétifienne | – | Progrès Olympique Chlef | – | – | – | – | – | 0–0 | [ Report] |
| 2 Apr | 10:00 | Olympique El Kseur | – | MB Béjaïa | – | – | – | – | – | 0–0 | [ Report] |
| 2 Apr | 10:00 | Nadi Riadhi Bordj Bou Arréridj | – | El Fanar Aïn Azel | – | – | – | – | – | 0–0 | [ Report] |

=== Round 14 ===
| Date | Time | | Score | | Set 1 | Set 2 | Set 3 | Set 4 | Set 5 | Total | Report |
|---|---|---|---|---|---|---|---|---|---|---|---|
| 23 Apr | 16:30 | GS Pétroliers MVB | 3–1 | Nadi Riadhi Bordj Bou Arréridj | 25–13 | 25–21 | 23–25 | 25–14 | – | 98–73 | Report |
| 23 Apr | 16:00 | El Fanar Aïn Azel | 3–0 | Olympique El Kseur | 25–12 | 25–12 | 25–12 | – | – | 75–36 | Report |
| 23 Apr | 16:00 | MB Béjaïa | 2–3 | Étoile sportive sétifienne | 23–25 | 25–22 | 25–19 | 18–25 | 12–15 | 103–106 | Report |
| 23 Apr | 16:00 | Progrès Olympique Chlef | 2–3 | Olympique Milien Ketamien | 15–25 | 24–26 | 25–21 | 25–20 | 13–15 | 102–107 | Report |

== Regular season F ==
| Pos | Team | Pld | W | L | Pts | SW | SL | SR | SPW | SPL | SPR | Qualification or relegation |
|---|---|---|---|---|---|---|---|---|---|---|---|---|
| 1 | Widad Athlétic Tlemcen | 13 | 13 | 0 | 35 | 39 | 14 | 2.786 | 1246 | 1120 | 1.113 | Champions |
| 2 | Nacéria Club Béjaïa | 13 | 9 | 4 | 27 | 33 | 21 | 1.571 | 1254 | 1184 | 1.059 | |
| 3 | MCB Laghouat | 13 | 8 | 5 | 26 | 31 | 20 | 1.550 | 1148 | 1137 | 1.010 | |
| 4 | Association Sportive Ville Blida | 13 | 6 | 7 | 22 | 29 | 23 | 1.261 | 1183 | 1071 | 1.105 | |
| 5 | ITR Sétif | 13 | 6 | 7 | 18 | 25 | 28 | 0.893 | 1177 | 1185 | 0.993 | |
| 6 | Widad Olympique Rouïba | 13 | 7 | 6 | 17 | 21 | 30 | 0.700 | 1070 | 1149 | 0.931 | |
| 7 | Raed Chabab M'sila | 13 | 2 | 11 | 8 | 18 | 35 | 0.514 | 1144 | 1224 | 0.935 | |
| 8 | IBM Chaanba | 13 | 2 | 11 | 6 | 11 | 37 | 0.297 | 918 | 1068 | 0.860 | Relegated to League 2 |

=== Round 1 ===
| Date | Time | | Score | | Set 1 | Set 2 | Set 3 | Set 4 | Set 5 | Total | Report |
|---|---|---|---|---|---|---|---|---|---|---|---|
| 22 Dec | 17:00 | Widad Athlétic Tlemcen | 3–1 | RC M'sila | 25–17 | 30–32 | 25–22 | 28–26 | – | 108–97 | Report |
| 22 Dec | 16:30 | Association Sportive Ville Blida | 3–0 | WO Rouïba | 25–15 | 25–17 | 25–12 | – | – | 75–44 | Report |
| 22 Dec | 17:30 | ITR Sétif | 3–1 | IBM Chaanba | 25–23 | 25–18 | 22–25 | 25–18 | – | 97–84 | Report |
| 22 Dec | 16:00 | MCB Laghouat | 1–3 | NC Béjaïa | 20–25 | 26–28 | 25–19 | 24–26 | – | 95–98 | Report |

=== Round 2 ===
| Date | Time | | Score | | Set 1 | Set 2 | Set 3 | Set 4 | Set 5 | Total | Report |
|---|---|---|---|---|---|---|---|---|---|---|---|
| 19 Jan | 17:00 | Widad Athlétic Tlemcen | – | Association Sportive Ville Blida | – | – | – | – | – | 0–0 | [ Report] |
| 19 Jan | 16:00 | NC Béjaïa | 3–1 | ITR Sétif | 22–25 | 25–21 | 25–21 | 25–15 | – | 97–82 | Report |
| 19 Jan | 17:00 | RC M'sila | – | IBM Chaanba | – | – | – | – | – | 0–0 | [ Report] |
| 19 Jan | 17:00 | WO Rouïba | – | MCB Laghouat | – | – | – | – | – | 0–0 | [ Report] |

=== Round 3 ===
| Date | Time | | Score | | Set 1 | Set 2 | Set 3 | Set 4 | Set 5 | Total | Report |
|---|---|---|---|---|---|---|---|---|---|---|---|
| 22 Jan | 16:30 | Association Sportive Ville Blida | 3–1 | RC M'sila | 25–20 | 21–25 | 25–9 | 25–16 | – | 96–70 | Report |
| 22 Jan | 17:00 | MCB Laghouat | 2–3 | Widad Athlétic Tlemcen | 21–25 | 25–22 | 25–18 | 20–25 | 14–16 | 105–106 | Report |
| 22 Jan | 17:30 | ITR Sétif | 3–0 | WO Rouïba | 25–22 | 25–22 | 25–21 | – | – | 75–65 | Report |
| 22 Jan | 16:30 | IBM Chaanba | 1–3 | NC Béjaïa | 19–25 | 25–21 | 15–25 | 20–25 | – | 79–96 | Report |

=== Round 4 ===
| Date | Time | | Score | | Set 1 | Set 2 | Set 3 | Set 4 | Set 5 | Total | Report |
|---|---|---|---|---|---|---|---|---|---|---|---|
| 29 Jan | 17:00 | RC M'sila | 0–3 | NC Béjaïa | 24–26 | 22–25 | 20–25 | – | – | 66–76 | Report |
| 29 Jan | 17:00 | WO Rouïba | 3–0 | IBM Chaanba | 25–20 | 25–14 | 25–20 | – | – | 75–54 | Report |
| 29 Jan | 16:00 | Widad Athlétic Tlemcen | 3–1 | ITR Sétif | 16–25 | 25–18 | 25–15 | 25–21 | – | 91–79 | Report |
| 29 Jan | 16:00 | Association Sportive Ville Blida | 3–0 | MCB Laghouat | 25–15 | 25–19 | 29–27 | – | – | 79–61 | Report |

=== Round 5 ===
| Date | Time | | Score | | Set 1 | Set 2 | Set 3 | Set 4 | Set 5 | Total | Report |
|---|---|---|---|---|---|---|---|---|---|---|---|
| 6 Feb | 10:00 | MCB Laghouat | – | RC M'sila | – | – | – | – | – | 0–0 | [ Report] |
| 6 Feb | 10:00 | ITR Sétif | – | Association Sportive Ville Blida | – | – | – | – | – | 0–0 | [ Report] |
| 6 Feb | 10:00 | IBM Chaanba | – | Widad Athlétic Tlemcen | – | – | – | – | – | 0–0 | [ Report] |
| 6 Feb | 10:00 | NC Béjaïa | – | WO Rouïba | – | – | – | – | – | 0–0 | [ Report] |

=== Round 6 ===
| Date | Time | | Score | | Set 1 | Set 2 | Set 3 | Set 4 | Set 5 | Total | Report |
|---|---|---|---|---|---|---|---|---|---|---|---|
| 13 Feb | 10:00 | RC M'sila | – | WO Rouïba | – | – | – | – | – | 0–0 | [ Report] |
| 13 Feb | 10:00 | Widad Athlétic Tlemcen | – | NC Béjaïa | – | – | – | – | – | 0–0 | [ Report] |
| 13 Feb | 10:00 | Association Sportive Ville Blida | – | IBM Chaanba | – | – | – | – | – | 0–0 | [ Report] |
| 13 Feb | 10:00 | MCB Laghouat | – | ITR Sétif | – | – | – | – | – | 0–0 | [ Report] |

=== Round 7 ===
| Date | Time | | Score | | Set 1 | Set 2 | Set 3 | Set 4 | Set 5 | Total | Report |
|---|---|---|---|---|---|---|---|---|---|---|---|
| 20 Feb | 10:00 | ITR Sétif | – | RC M'sila | – | – | – | – | – | 0–0 | [ Report] |
| 20 Feb | 10:00 | IBM Chaanba | – | MCB Laghouat | – | – | – | – | – | 0–0 | [ Report] |
| 20 Feb | 10:00 | NC Béjaïa | – | Association Sportive Ville Blida | – | – | – | – | – | 0–0 | [ Report] |
| 20 Feb | 10:00 | WO Rouïba | – | Widad Athlétic Tlemcen | – | – | – | – | – | 0–0 | [ Report] |

=== Round 8 ===
| Date | Time | | Score | | Set 1 | Set 2 | Set 3 | Set 4 | Set 5 | Total | Report |
|---|---|---|---|---|---|---|---|---|---|---|---|
| 4 Mar | 17:00 | RC M'sila | – | Widad Athlétic Tlemcen | – | – | – | – | – | 0–0 | [ Report] |
| 4 Mar | 17:00 | WO Rouïba | – | Association Sportive Ville Blida | – | – | – | – | – | 0–0 | [ Report] |
| 4 Mar | 16:30 | IBM Chaanba | – | ITR Sétif | – | – | – | – | – | 0–0 | [ Report] |
| 4 Mar | 15:00 | NC Béjaïa | – | MCB Laghouat | – | – | – | – | – | 0–0 | [ Report] |

=== Round 9 ===
| Date | Time | | Score | | Set 1 | Set 2 | Set 3 | Set 4 | Set 5 | Total | Report |
|---|---|---|---|---|---|---|---|---|---|---|---|
| 11 Mar | 16:30 | Association Sportive Ville Blida | 1–3 | Widad Athlétic Tlemcen | 12–25 | 17–25 | 25–18 | 21–25 | – | 75–93 | Report |
| 11 Mar | 17:30 | ITR Sétif | 2–3 | NC Béjaïa | 25–21 | 28–26 | 21–25 | 22–25 | 17–19 | 113–116 | Report |
| 11 Mar | 16:30 | IBM Chaanba | 3–2 | RC M'sila | 21–25 | 28–26 | 25–22 | 24–26 | 15–13 | 113–112 | Report |
| 11 Mar | 17:00 | MCB Laghouat | 3–0 | WO Rouïba | 25–17 | 26–24 | 25–21 | – | – | 76–62 | Report |

=== Round 10 ===
| Date | Time | | Score | | Set 1 | Set 2 | Set 3 | Set 4 | Set 5 | Total | Report |
|---|---|---|---|---|---|---|---|---|---|---|---|
| 19 Mar | 17:00 | RC M'sila | 3–2 | Association Sportive Ville Blida | 17–25 | 21–25 | 25–17 | 25–23 | 25–11 | 113–101 | Report |
| 19 Mar | 16:00 | Widad Athlétic Tlemcen | 3–2 | MCB Laghouat | 25–19 | 22–25 | 23–25 | 25–23 | 15–9 | 110–101 | Report |
| 19 Mar | 17:00 | WO Rouïba | 3–2 | ITR Sétif | 25–20 | 19–25 | 25–20 | 23–25 | 15–13 | 107–103 | Report |
| 19 Mar | 16:00 | NC Béjaïa | 3–0 | IBM Chaanba | 25–21 | 25–16 | 25–15 | – | – | 75–52 | Report |

=== Round 11 ===
| Date | Time | | Score | | Set 1 | Set 2 | Set 3 | Set 4 | Set 5 | Total | Report |
|---|---|---|---|---|---|---|---|---|---|---|---|
| 2 Apr | 17:00 | NC Béjaïa | 3–1 | RC M'sila | 19–25 | 25–22 | 25–22 | 25–23 | – | 94–92 | Report |
| 2 Apr | 10:00 | IBM Chaanba | 3–1 | WO Rouïba | 17–25 | 26–24 | 28–26 | 25–16 | – | 96–91 | Report |
| 2 Apr | 13:00 | ITR Sétif | 0–3 | Widad Athlétic Tlemcen | 26–28 | 18–25 | 21–25 | – | – | 65–78 | Report |
| 2 Apr | 16:00 | MCB Laghouat | 3–2 | Association Sportive Ville Blida | 14–25 | 25–22 | 25–23 | 26–28 | – | 90–98 | Report |

=== Round 12 ===
| Date | Time | | Score | | Set 1 | Set 2 | Set 3 | Set 4 | Set 5 | Total | Report |
|---|---|---|---|---|---|---|---|---|---|---|---|
| 8 Apr | 17:00 | RC M'sila | 1–3 | MCB Laghouat | 25–19 | 21–25 | 25–27 | 23–25 | – | 94–96 | Report |
| 8 Apr | 16:30 | Association Sportive Ville Blida | 3–0 | ITR Sétif | 25–19 | 25–16 | 25–23 | – | – | 75–58 | Report |
| 8 Apr | 16:00 | Widad Athlétic Tlemcen | 3–0 | IBM Chaanba | 25–19 | 25–16 | 25–23 | – | – | 75–58 | Report |
| 8 Apr | 17:00 | WO Rouïba | 3–2 | NC Béjaïa | 25–21 | 22–25 | 25–21 | 22–25 | 15–12 | 109–104 | Report |

=== Round 13 ===
| Date | Time | | Score | | Set 1 | Set 2 | Set 3 | Set 4 | Set 5 | Total | Report |
|---|---|---|---|---|---|---|---|---|---|---|---|
| 15 Apr | 10:00 | WO Rouïba | – | RC M'sila | – | – | – | – | – | 0–0 | [ Report] |
| 15 Apr | 10:00 | NC Béjaïa | – | Widad Athlétic Tlemcen | – | – | – | – | – | 0–0 | [ Report] |
| 15 Apr | 10:00 | IBM Chaanba | – | Association Sportive Ville Blida | – | – | – | – | – | 0–0 | [ Report] |
| 15 Apr | 10:00 | ITR Sétif | – | MCB Laghouat | – | – | – | – | – | 0–0 | [ Report] |

=== Round 14 ===
| Date | Time | | Score | | Set 1 | Set 2 | Set 3 | Set 4 | Set 5 | Total | Report |
|---|---|---|---|---|---|---|---|---|---|---|---|
| 22 Apr | 17:00 | RC M'sila | 1–3 | ITR Sétif | 25–22 | 18–25 | 23–25 | 22–25 | – | 88–97 | Report |
| 22 Apr | 17:00 | MCB Laghouat | 3–0 | IBM Chaanba | 25–15 | 25–22 | 26–24 | – | – | 76–61 | Report |
| 22 Apr | 16:30 | Association Sportive Ville Blida | 1–3 | NC Béjaïa | 25–19 | 23–25 | 18–25 | 18–25 | – | 84–94 | Report |
| 22 Apr | 16:00 | Widad Athlétic Tlemcen | 3–1 | WO Rouïba | 25–21 | 25–20 | 19–25 | 25–21 | – | 94–87 | Report |
