= 2026 Women's European Volleyball Championship Pool A =

Volleyball tournament results

Pool A is one of four pools of the preliminary round of the 2026 Women's European Volleyball Championship. The pool consists of the Germany, Hungary, Latvia, Poland, Slovenia and co-hosts Turkey. All games were played at the Sinan Erdem Dome in Istanbul from 21 to 28 August 2026. The top four teams advanced to the final round. The top four teams that advanced were Poland, who managed to topple co-hosts Turkey to win the group, the Turks with four wins, Slovenia in third with 3 wins and finally Germany securing fourth with two victories.

== Teams ==
Team	Qualification method	Date of qualification	Appearance(s)				Previous best performance (Note: Bold text indicates they hosted that edition.)	WR (Note: World ranking at start of tournament.)
Team	Qualification method	Date of qualification	Total	First	Last	Streak	Previous best performance	WR
Turkey (Note: Turkey also belatedly qualified as a 2026 host nation.)	Top eight in 2023	27 August 2023	17th	1963	2023	12	Champions (2023)	3
Poland	Top eight in 2023	27 August 2023	33rd	1949	2023	16	Champions (2003, 2005)	5
Slovenia	Pool C winner	2 August 2025	4th	2015	2023	2	Round of 16 (2019)	19
Germany	Pool A winner	6 August 2025	18th	1991	2023	18	Runners-up (2011, 2013)	12
Latvia	Five best runner-ups	10 August 2025	4th	1993	1997	1	Eighth place (1997)	65
Hungary	Five best runner-ups	10 August 2025	20th	1949	2023	6	Runners-up (1975)	26

== Venue ==
Turkey's biggest indoor arena, the Sinan Erdem Dome, hosted Pool A. The venue was built in 2010 in preparation for the 2010 FIBA World Championship where, it was the main venue for the tournament, hosting the final phase. The facility was also the main host for EuroBasket 2017. This will be the first major volleyball tournament in this arena.

2026 Women's European Volleyball Championship Pool A is located in Turkey	Istanbul
2026 Women's European Volleyball Championship Pool A is located in Turkey	Sinan Erdem Dome
2026 Women's European Volleyball Championship Pool A is located in Turkey	Capacity: 16,000

== Group standings ==
Pos	Team	Pld	W	L	Pts	SW	SL	SR	SPW	SPL	SPR	Qualification
1	Poland	5	5	0	14	15	3	5.000	425	373	1.139	Final round
2	Turkey (H)	5	4	1	13	14	5	2.800	451	370	1.219	Final round
3	Slovenia	5	3	2	8	10	8	1.250	394	384	1.026	Final round
4	Germany	5	2	3	6	7	10	0.700	379	376	1.008	Final round
5	Latvia	5	1	4	3	7	14	0.500	414	485	0.854	
6	Hungary	5	0	5	1	2	15	0.133	339	414	0.819	

Source: CEV
(H) Host

=== Group progression ===
The table listed the results of teams in each round.

Win	Loss

Team ╲ Round	1	2	3	4	5
Germany	L	W	W	L	L
Hungary	L	L	L	L	L
Latvia	L	L	L	L	W
Poland	W	W	W	W	W
Slovenia	W	L	L	W	W
Turkey	W	W	W	W	L

Source: CEV

=== Positions by round ===
The table listed the positions of teams in each round.

Advance to the knockout stage

Team ╲ Round	1	2	3	4	5
Germany	5	4	3	3	4
Hungary	6	6	6	6	6
Latvia	6	5	5	5	5
Poland	2	2	2	1	1
Slovenia	2	3	4	4	3
Turkey	1	1	1	2	2

Source: CEV

== Matches ==
- All times are Further-eastern European Time (UTC+03:00).

=== Turkey vs Latvia ===
21 August 2026; 19:00; Match duration: 1 hr 17 min	Turkey	3–0	Latvia	Sinan Erdem Dome, Istanbul; Attendance: 9,112; Referees: Vanya Parvanova (BUL), Fuad Aghayev (AZE)
21 August 2026; 19:00; Match duration: 1 hr 17 min	(25–17, 25–16, 25–16); Report			Sinan Erdem Dome, Istanbul; Attendance: 9,112; Referees: Vanya Parvanova (BUL), Fuad Aghayev (AZE)
21 August 2026; 19:00; Match duration: 1 hr 17 min	Scoring leaders			Sinan Erdem Dome, Istanbul; Attendance: 9,112; Referees: Vanya Parvanova (BUL), Fuad Aghayev (AZE)
Vargas 19		Total	Levinska 13
Vargas (12/19)		Attack	Levinska (13/39)
Vargas 4		Block	Rīta 2
Vargas (3/9)		Serve	Vagele (2/5)

=== Germany vs Slovenia ===
22 August 2026; 16:00; Match duration: 1 hr 40 min	Germany	0–3	Slovenia	Sinan Erdem Dome, Istanbul; Attendance: 281; Referees: Bogdan Stoica (ROU), Predrag Balandžić (SRB)
22 August 2026; 16:00; Match duration: 1 hr 40 min	(22–25, 21–25, 20–25); Report			Sinan Erdem Dome, Istanbul; Attendance: 281; Referees: Bogdan Stoica (ROU), Predrag Balandžić (SRB)
22 August 2026; 16:00; Match duration: 1 hr 40 min	Scoring leaders			Sinan Erdem Dome, Istanbul; Attendance: 281; Referees: Bogdan Stoica (ROU), Predrag Balandžić (SRB)
Grozer 12		Total	Sillah 24
Grozer (10/28)		Attack	Sillah (5/44)
Cekulaev 3		Block	Sillah 4
three players 1		Serve	Godec, Milošič 1

=== Hungary vs Poland ===
22 August 2026; 19:00; Match duration: 1 hr 29 min	Hungary	0–3	Poland	Sinan Erdem Dome, Istanbul; Attendance: 233; Referees: Theodora Kyriopoulou (GRE), Vanya Parvanova (BUL)
22 August 2026; 19:00; Match duration: 1 hr 29 min	(12–25, 24–26, 20–25); Report			Sinan Erdem Dome, Istanbul; Attendance: 233; Referees: Theodora Kyriopoulou (GRE), Vanya Parvanova (BUL)
22 August 2026; 19:00; Match duration: 1 hr 29 min	Scoring leaders			Sinan Erdem Dome, Istanbul; Attendance: 233; Referees: Theodora Kyriopoulou (GRE), Vanya Parvanova (BUL)
Németh 22		Total	Stysiak 15
Németh (22/57)		Attack	Lampkowska (13/20)
Csereklye, Kump 2		Block	Koput 5
Bozóki-Szedmák (1/11)		Serve	Koput, Wenerska 1

=== Latvia vs Germany ===
23 August 2026; 16:00; Match duration: 1 hr 55 min	Latvia	1–3	Germany	Sinan Erdem Dome, Istanbul; Attendance: 4,102; Referees: Predrag Balandžić (SRB), Theodora Kyriopoulou (GRE)
23 August 2026; 16:00; Match duration: 1 hr 55 min	(15–25, 18–25, 25–13, 15–25); Report			Sinan Erdem Dome, Istanbul; Attendance: 4,102; Referees: Predrag Balandžić (SRB), Theodora Kyriopoulou (GRE)
23 August 2026; 16:00; Match duration: 1 hr 55 min	Scoring leaders			Sinan Erdem Dome, Istanbul; Attendance: 4,102; Referees: Predrag Balandžić (SRB), Theodora Kyriopoulou (GRE)
Levinska 24		Total	Alsmeier, Grozer 17
Levinska (23/67)		Attack	Alsmeier (16/36)
three players 2		Block	Grozer 4
three players 1		Serve	Weitzel (3/21)

=== Slovenia vs Turkey ===
23 August 2026; 19:00; Match duration: 2 hr 1 min	Slovenia	1−3	Turkey	Sinan Erdem Dome, Istanbul; Attendance: 15,628; Referees: Fuad Aghayev (AZE), Bogdan Stoica (ROU)
23 August 2026; 19:00; Match duration: 2 hr 1 min	(21−25, 25−22, 17−25, 16−25); Report			Sinan Erdem Dome, Istanbul; Attendance: 15,628; Referees: Fuad Aghayev (AZE), Bogdan Stoica (ROU)
23 August 2026; 19:00; Match duration: 2 hr 1 min	Scoring leaders			Sinan Erdem Dome, Istanbul; Attendance: 15,628; Referees: Fuad Aghayev (AZE), Bogdan Stoica (ROU)
Pucelj 17		Total	Vargas 19
Pucelj (15/27)		Attack	Vargas (17/28)
Planinšec 3		Block	Güneş 3
Planinšec, Pucelj 2		Serve	Şahin 2

=== Poland vs Latvia ===
24 August 2026; 16:00; Match duration: 2 hr 16 min	Poland	3–1	Latvia	Sinan Erdem Dome, Istanbul; Attendance: 3,364; Referees: Bogdan Laurentiu Stoica (ROU), Theodora Kyriopoulou (GRE)
24 August 2026; 16:00; Match duration: 2 hr 16 min	(25–19, 23–25, 25–22, 26–24); Report			Sinan Erdem Dome, Istanbul; Attendance: 3,364; Referees: Bogdan Laurentiu Stoica (ROU), Theodora Kyriopoulou (GRE)
24 August 2026; 16:00; Match duration: 2 hr 16 min	Scoring leaders			Sinan Erdem Dome, Istanbul; Attendance: 3,364; Referees: Bogdan Laurentiu Stoica (ROU), Theodora Kyriopoulou (GRE)
Lampkowska 18		Total	Levinska 30
Lampkowska (15/28)		Attack	Levinska (24/63)
Piasecka 4		Block	Levinska 4
Lampkowska 2		Serve	Jurdža, Struka 3

=== Turkey vs Hungary ===
24 August 2026; 19:00; Match duration: 1 hr 28 min	Turkey	3–0	Hungary	Sinan Erdem Dome, Istanbul; Attendance: 13,499; Referees: Vanya Parvanova (BUL), Fuad Aghayev (AZE)
24 August 2026; 19:00; Match duration: 1 hr 28 min	(26–24, 25–21, 25–14); Report			Sinan Erdem Dome, Istanbul; Attendance: 13,499; Referees: Vanya Parvanova (BUL), Fuad Aghayev (AZE)
24 August 2026; 19:00; Match duration: 1 hr 28 min	Scoring leaders			Sinan Erdem Dome, Istanbul; Attendance: 13,499; Referees: Vanya Parvanova (BUL), Fuad Aghayev (AZE)
Vargas 24		Total	Németh 15
Vargas (17/26)		Attack	Németh (12/41)
Vargas, Uyanık 2		Block	Németh 3
Vargas 5		Serve	Petrenkó, Csereklye 2

=== Hungary vs Germany ===
25 August 2026; 16:00; Match duration: 1 hr 26 min	Hungary	0–3	Germany	Sinan Erdem Dome, Istanbul; Attendance: 286; Referees: Theodora Kyriopoulou (GRE), Vanya Parvanova (BUL)
25 August 2026; 16:00; Match duration: 1 hr 26 min	(17–25, 21–25, 14–25); Report			Sinan Erdem Dome, Istanbul; Attendance: 286; Referees: Theodora Kyriopoulou (GRE), Vanya Parvanova (BUL)
25 August 2026; 16:00; Match duration: 1 hr 26 min	Scoring leaders			Sinan Erdem Dome, Istanbul; Attendance: 286; Referees: Theodora Kyriopoulou (GRE), Vanya Parvanova (BUL)
Németh 16		Total	Alsmeier 13
Németh (15/35)		Attack	Alsmeier (11/28)
three players 1		Block	three players 2
Németh, Petrenkó 1		Serve	Alsmeier, Cekulaev 1

=== Poland vs Slovenia ===
25 August 2026; 19:00; Match duration: 1 hr 32 min	Poland	3–0	Slovenia	Sinan Erdem Dome, Istanbul; Attendance: 247; Referees: Predrag Balandžić (SRB), Bogdan Laurentiu Stoica (ROU)
25 August 2026; 19:00; Match duration: 1 hr 32 min	(25–14, 28–26, 25–18); Report			Sinan Erdem Dome, Istanbul; Attendance: 247; Referees: Predrag Balandžić (SRB), Bogdan Laurentiu Stoica (ROU)
25 August 2026; 19:00; Match duration: 1 hr 32 min	Scoring leaders			Sinan Erdem Dome, Istanbul; Attendance: 247; Referees: Predrag Balandžić (SRB), Bogdan Laurentiu Stoica (ROU)
Stysiak 24		Total	Sillah 19
Stysiak (24/37)		Attack	Sillah (18/36)
three players 2		Block	Milošič 3
Wenerska (1/15)		Serve	Lorber Fijok, Mori 2

=== Slovenia vs Latvia ===
26 August 2026; 16:00; Match duration: 2 hr 10 min	Slovenia	3–2	Latvia	Sinan Erdem Dome, Istanbul; Attendance: 3,282; Referees: Bogdan Stoica (ROU), Theodora Kyriopoulou (GRE)
26 August 2026; 16:00; Match duration: 2 hr 10 min	(23–25, 19–25, 25–15, 25–13, 15–12); Report			Sinan Erdem Dome, Istanbul; Attendance: 3,282; Referees: Bogdan Stoica (ROU), Theodora Kyriopoulou (GRE)
26 August 2026; 16:00; Match duration: 2 hr 10 min	Scoring leaders			Sinan Erdem Dome, Istanbul; Attendance: 3,282; Referees: Bogdan Stoica (ROU), Theodora Kyriopoulou (GRE)
Pucelj 20		Total	Ņečiporuka 20
Pucelj (18/49)		Attack	Levinska (17/55)
Milošič, Planinšec 4		Block	Struka 5
Lorber Fijok, Sillah 1		Serve	Jurdža, Ņečiporuka 3

=== Germany vs Turkey ===
26 August 2026; 19:00; Match duration: 1 hr 57 min	Germany	1–3	Turkey	Sinan Erdem Dome, Istanbul; Attendance: 15,713; Referees: Fuad Aghayev (AZE), Predrag Balandžić (SRB)
26 August 2026; 19:00; Match duration: 1 hr 57 min	(21–25, 27–25, 20–25, 19–25); Report			Sinan Erdem Dome, Istanbul; Attendance: 15,713; Referees: Fuad Aghayev (AZE), Predrag Balandžić (SRB)
26 August 2026; 19:00; Match duration: 1 hr 57 min	Scoring leaders			Sinan Erdem Dome, Istanbul; Attendance: 15,713; Referees: Fuad Aghayev (AZE), Predrag Balandžić (SRB)
Alsmeier 18		Total	Vargas 23
Alsmeier (18/43)		Attack	Vargas (17/31)
Cekulaev, Weitzel 3		Block	four players 3
Grozer (2/22)		Serve	Vargas (3/23)

=== Poland vs Germany ===
27 August 2026; 16:00; Match duration: 1 hr 35 min	Poland	3–0	Germany	Sinan Erdem Dome, Istanbul; Attendance: 371; Referees: Vanya Parvanova (BUL), Predrag Balandžić (SRB)
27 August 2026; 16:00; Match duration: 1 hr 35 min	(25–19, 25–23, 26–24); Report			Sinan Erdem Dome, Istanbul; Attendance: 371; Referees: Vanya Parvanova (BUL), Predrag Balandžić (SRB)
27 August 2026; 16:00; Match duration: 1 hr 35 min	Scoring leaders			Sinan Erdem Dome, Istanbul; Attendance: 371; Referees: Vanya Parvanova (BUL), Predrag Balandžić (SRB)
Stysiak 25		Total	Alsmeier 13
Stysiak (22/40)		Attack	Alsmeier (13/30)
Jurczyk, Koput 3		Block	Grozer, Weitzel 3
three players 1		Serve	Grozer (2/12)

=== Latvia vs Hungary ===
27 August 2026; 19:00; Match duration: 2 hr 39 min	Latvia	3–2	Hungary	Sinan Erdem Dome, Istanbul; Attendance: 325; Referees: Theodora Kyriopoulou (GRE), Fuad Aghayev (AZE)
27 August 2026; 19:00; Match duration: 2 hr 39 min	(25–22, 18–25, 21–25, 33–31, 15–13); Report			Sinan Erdem Dome, Istanbul; Attendance: 325; Referees: Theodora Kyriopoulou (GRE), Fuad Aghayev (AZE)
27 August 2026; 19:00; Match duration: 2 hr 39 min	Scoring leaders			Sinan Erdem Dome, Istanbul; Attendance: 325; Referees: Theodora Kyriopoulou (GRE), Fuad Aghayev (AZE)
Levinska 33		Total	Németh 34
Levinska (30/85)		Attack	Németh (30/74)
Struka 5		Block	Csereklye 4
Ņečiporuka (2/24)		Serve	Csereklye, Petrenkó 3

=== Slovenia vs Hungary ===
28 August 2026; 16:00; Match duration: 1 hr 15 min	Slovenia	3–0	Hungary	Sinan Erdem Dome, Istanbul; Attendance: 1,379; Referees: Predrag Balandžić (SRB), Bogdan Stoica (ROU)
28 August 2026; 16:00; Match duration: 1 hr 15 min	(25–21, 25–19, 25–16); Report			Sinan Erdem Dome, Istanbul; Attendance: 1,379; Referees: Predrag Balandžić (SRB), Bogdan Stoica (ROU)
28 August 2026; 16:00; Match duration: 1 hr 15 min	Scoring leaders			Sinan Erdem Dome, Istanbul; Attendance: 1,379; Referees: Predrag Balandžić (SRB), Bogdan Stoica (ROU)
Milošič 11		Total	Németh 13
Sillah (7/27)		Attack	Németh (11/32)
Milošič 4		Block	four players 1
three players 1		Serve	Németh (1/4)

=== Turkey vs Poland ===
28 August 2026; 19:00; Match duration: 2 hr 9 min	Turkey	2–3	Poland	Sinan Erdem Dome, Istanbul; Attendance: 15,814; Referees: Fuad Aghayev (AZE), Vanya Parvanova (BUL)
28 August 2026; 19:00; Match duration: 2 hr 9 min	(25–15, 21–25, 22–25, 25-16, 10-15); Report			Sinan Erdem Dome, Istanbul; Attendance: 15,814; Referees: Fuad Aghayev (AZE), Vanya Parvanova (BUL)
28 August 2026; 19:00; Match duration: 2 hr 9 min	Scoring leaders			Sinan Erdem Dome, Istanbul; Attendance: 15,814; Referees: Fuad Aghayev (AZE), Vanya Parvanova (BUL)
Vargas 21		Total	Szczurowska 26
Vargas (18/49)		Attack	Szczurowska (23/42)
Güneş, Vargas 3		Block	Damaske, Koput 2
Güneş (2/18)		Serve	Stefanik, Szczurowska 2
