= 2026 Women's European Volleyball Championship Pool C =

Volleyball tournament results

Pool C is one of four pools of the preliminary round of the 2026 Women's European Volleyball Championship. The pool consists of the co-hosts Azerbaijan, Belgium, Portugal, Netherlands, Romania, and Spain. All games were played at the National Gymnastics Arena in Baku from 21 to 28 August 2026. The top four teams advanced to the final round. With five wins, Belgium won the group, with Netherlands, co-hosts Azerbaijan and Portugal advancing with four, three and two wins respectively. The Portuguese reached the knockout stage for the first time ever.

== Teams ==
| Team | Qualification method | Date of qualification | Appearance(s) | | | | Previous best performance (Note: Bold text indicates they hosted that edition.) | WR (Note: World ranking at start of tournament.) |
| Team | Qualification method | Date of qualification | Total | First | Last | Streak | Previous best performance | WR |
|---|---|---|---|---|---|---|---|---|
| Netherlands | Top eight in 2023 | 27 August 2023 | 31st | 1949 | 2023 | 18 | Champions (1995) | 8 |
| Azerbaijan | Host nation | 12 March 2024 | 11th | 2005 | 2023 | 11 | Fourth place (2005, 2017) | 49 |
| Romania | Five best runner-ups | 6 August 2025 | 28th | 1949 | 2023 | 4 | Third place (1963) | 28 |
| Spain | Pool E winner | 6 August 2025 | 9th | 2005 | 2023 | 4 | Ninth place (2009) | 30 |
| Belgium | Pool B winner | 6 August 2025 | 13th | 1967 | 2023 | 7 | Third place (2013) | 16 |
| Portugal | Five best runner-ups | 10 August 2025 | 2nd | 2019 | | 1 | 24th place (2019) | 48 |

== Venue ==
Azerbaijan's National Gymnastics Arena organised Pool C. It was constructed in 2009 and has hosted numerous Gymnastics championships, most notably, the 2019 Rhythmic Gymnastics European Championships. The venue has also played host to the 2018 World Judo Championships and events at the 2015 European Games and 2017 Islamic Solidarity Games.

| 2026 Women's European Volleyball Championship Pool C is located in Azerbaijan | Baku |
|---|---|
| 2026 Women's European Volleyball Championship Pool C is located in Azerbaijan | National Gymnastics Arena |
| 2026 Women's European Volleyball Championship Pool C is located in Azerbaijan | Capacity: 9,000 |

== Group standings ==
| Pos | Team | Pld | W | L | Pts | SW | SL | SR | SPW | SPL | SPR | Qualification |
|---|---|---|---|---|---|---|---|---|---|---|---|---|
| 1 | Belgium | 5 | 5 | 0 | 13 | 15 | 4 | 3.750 | 438 | 371 | 1.181 | Final round |
| 2 | Netherlands | 5 | 4 | 1 | 12 | 14 | 6 | 2.333 | 463 | 389 | 1.190 | Final round |
| 3 | Azerbaijan (H) | 5 | 3 | 2 | 8 | 10 | 9 | 1.111 | 423 | 412 | 1.027 | Final round |
| 4 | Portugal | 5 | 2 | 3 | 5 | 7 | 12 | 0.583 | 405 | 450 | 0.900 | Final round |
| 5 | Romania | 5 | 1 | 4 | 6 | 9 | 12 | 0.750 | 445 | 454 | 0.980 | |
| 6 | Spain | 5 | 0 | 5 | 1 | 3 | 15 | 0.200 | 332 | 430 | 0.772 | |

Source: CEV
(H) Host

=== Group progression ===
The table listed the results of teams in each round.

| Win | Loss |

| Team ╲ Round | 1 | 2 | 3 | 4 | 5 |
|---|---|---|---|---|---|
| Azerbaijan | W | W | W | L | L |
| Belgium | W | W | W | W | W |
| Netherlands | W | W | W | L | W |
| Portugal | L | L | L | W | W |
| Romania | L | L | L | L | W |
| Spain | L | L | L | L | L |

Source: CEV

=== Positions by round ===
The table listed the positions of teams in each round.

| Advance to the knockout stage |

| Team ╲ Round | 1 | 2 | 3 | 4 | 5 |
|---|---|---|---|---|---|
| Azerbaijan | 1 | 1 | 3 | 3 | 3 |
| Belgium | 2 | 2 | 1 | 1 | 1 |
| Netherlands | 3 | 3 | 2 | 2 | 2 |
| Romania | 4 | 4 | 4 | 5 | 5 |
| Spain | 5 | 5 | 5 | 6 | 6 |
| Portugal | 6 | 6 | 6 | 4 | 4 |

Source: CEV

== Matches ==
- All times are Azerbaijan Time (AZT) (UTC+04:00).

=== Azerbaijan vs Portugal ===
| 21 August 2026; 19:00; Match duration: 2 hr 7 min | Azerbaijan | 3–1 | Portugal | National Gymnastics Arena, Baku; Attendance: 5,550; Referees: Erdal Akinci (TUR), Bartlomiej Adamczyk (POL) |
| 21 August 2026; 19:00; Match duration: 2 hr 7 min | (25–22, 23–25, 27–25, 25–20); Report | | | National Gymnastics Arena, Baku; Attendance: 5,550; Referees: Erdal Akinci (TUR), Bartlomiej Adamczyk (POL) |
| 21 August 2026; 19:00; Match duration: 2 hr 7 min | Scoring leaders | | | National Gymnastics Arena, Baku; Attendance: 5,550; Referees: Erdal Akinci (TUR), Bartlomiej Adamczyk (POL) |
| Ruban 25 | | Total | Maia 16 |
| Ruban (21/44) | | Attack | Maia (16/32) |
| four players 3 | | Block | Clemente 4 |
| Abdulazimova (2/22) | | Serve | Garcez (2/14) |

=== Belgium vs Spain ===
| 22 August 2026; 15:30; Match duration: 2 hr 5 min | Belgium | 3–2 | Spain | National Gymnastics Arena, Baku; Attendance: 200; Referees: Bartlomiej Adamczyk (POL), Dominik Biegajlo (ENG) |
| 22 August 2026; 15:30; Match duration: 2 hr 5 min | (25–15, 18–25, 23–25, 25–17, 15–8); Report | | | National Gymnastics Arena, Baku; Attendance: 200; Referees: Bartlomiej Adamczyk (POL), Dominik Biegajlo (ENG) |
| 22 August 2026; 15:30; Match duration: 2 hr 5 min | Scoring leaders | | | National Gymnastics Arena, Baku; Attendance: 200; Referees: Bartlomiej Adamczyk (POL), Dominik Biegajlo (ENG) |
| Herbots 25 | | Total | De Paula 25 |
| Martin (22/52) | | Attack | De Paula (24/57) |
| Fransen, Radovic 4 | | Block | Varela 3 |
| Fransen (2/12) | | Serve | Varela (3/14) |

=== Romania vs Netherlands ===
| 22 August 2026; 18:30; Match duration: 2 hr 9 min | Romania | 2–3 | Netherlands | National Gymnastics Arena, Baku; Attendance: 250; Referees: Michele Brunelli (ITA), Helena Persson (SWE) |
| 22 August 2026; 18:30; Match duration: 2 hr 9 min | (21–25, 28–26, 15–25, 25–22, 9–15); Report | | | National Gymnastics Arena, Baku; Attendance: 250; Referees: Michele Brunelli (ITA), Helena Persson (SWE) |
| 22 August 2026; 18:30; Match duration: 2 hr 9 min | Scoring leaders | | | National Gymnastics Arena, Baku; Attendance: 250; Referees: Michele Brunelli (ITA), Helena Persson (SWE) |
| Baciu 19 | | Total | Dambrink 24 |
| Baciu (17/40) | | Attack | Dambrink (21/36) |
| three players 2 | | Block | Baijens 4 |
| Buterez (2/21) | | Serve | Dambrink (2/10) |

=== Portugal vs Belgium ===
| 23 August 2026; 15:30; Match duration: 1 hr 11 min | Portugal | 0–3 | Belgium | National Gymnastics Arena, Baku; Attendance: 300; Referees: Dominik Biegajlo (ENG), Michele Brunelli (ITA) |
| 23 August 2026; 15:30; Match duration: 1 hr 11 min | (16–25, 21–25, 11–25); Report | | | National Gymnastics Arena, Baku; Attendance: 300; Referees: Dominik Biegajlo (ENG), Michele Brunelli (ITA) |
| 23 August 2026; 15:30; Match duration: 1 hr 11 min | Scoring leaders | | | National Gymnastics Arena, Baku; Attendance: 300; Referees: Dominik Biegajlo (ENG), Michele Brunelli (ITA) |
| Cassama, Monteiro 9 | | Total | Martin 16 |
| Cassama (9/14) | | Attack | Martin (15/28) |
| Monteiro 3 | | Block | Fransen, Koulberg 3 |
| Garcez, Kavalenka 1 | | Serve | Herbots (2/16) |

=== Spain vs Azerbaijan ===
| 23 August 2026; 18:30; Match duration: 1 hr 22 min | Spain | 0–3 | Azerbaijan | National Gymnastics Arena, Baku; Attendance: 4,250; Referees: Erdal Akinci (TUR), Helena Persson (SWE) |
| 23 August 2026; 18:30; Match duration: 1 hr 22 min | (16–25, 22–25, 15–25); Report | | | National Gymnastics Arena, Baku; Attendance: 4,250; Referees: Erdal Akinci (TUR), Helena Persson (SWE) |
| 23 August 2026; 18:30; Match duration: 1 hr 22 min | Scoring leaders | | | National Gymnastics Arena, Baku; Attendance: 4,250; Referees: Erdal Akinci (TUR), Helena Persson (SWE) |
| De Paula 15 | | Total | Ruban 20 |
| De Paula (12/41) | | Attack | Ruban (19/37) |
| Escamilla 2 | | Block | three players 2 |
| De Paula (2/11) | | Serve | Besman (2/16) |

=== Netherlands vs Portugal ===
| 24 August 2026; 15:30; Match duration: 1 hr 25 min | Netherlands | 3–0 | Portugal | National Gymnastics Arena, Baku; Attendance: 300; Referees: Helena Persson (SWE), Erdal Akinci (TUR) |
| 24 August 2026; 15:30; Match duration: 1 hr 25 min | (25–21, 25–18, 25–23); Report | | | National Gymnastics Arena, Baku; Attendance: 300; Referees: Helena Persson (SWE), Erdal Akinci (TUR) |
| 24 August 2026; 15:30; Match duration: 1 hr 25 min | Scoring leaders | | | National Gymnastics Arena, Baku; Attendance: 300; Referees: Helena Persson (SWE), Erdal Akinci (TUR) |
| Van de Vosse 25 | | Total | Cavalcanti 11 |
| Van de Vosse (19/32) | | Attack | Lopes (7/28) |
| Van de Vosse 4 | | Block | Cavalcanti 4 |
| Baijens (3/19) | | Serve | four players 1 |

=== Azerbaijan vs Romania ===
| 24 August 2026; 18:30; Match duration: 2 hr 5 min | Azerbaijan | 3−2 | Romania | National Gymnastics Arena, Baku; Attendance: 4,100; Referees: Bartlomiej Adamczyk (POL), Dominik Biegajlo (POL) |
| 24 August 2026; 18:30; Match duration: 2 hr 5 min | (25−21, 25−23, 15−25, 22−25, 15−8); Report | | | National Gymnastics Arena, Baku; Attendance: 4,100; Referees: Bartlomiej Adamczyk (POL), Dominik Biegajlo (POL) |
| 24 August 2026; 18:30; Match duration: 2 hr 5 min | Scoring leaders | | | National Gymnastics Arena, Baku; Attendance: 4,100; Referees: Bartlomiej Adamczyk (POL), Dominik Biegajlo (POL) |
| Rahimova 26 | | Total | Zadorojnai 19 |
| Rahimova (19/51) | | Attack | Zadorojnai (15/44) |
| Rahimova 4 | | Block | Buterez 3 |
| Rahimova 3 | | Serve | Cimpu 3 |

=== Romania vs Belgium ===
| 25 August 2026; 15:30; Match duration: 1 hr 20 min | Romania | 0–3 | Belgium | National Gymnastics Arena, Baku; Attendance: 200; Referees: Michele Brunelli (ITA), Bartlomiej Adamczyk (POL) |
| 25 August 2026; 15:30; Match duration: 1 hr 20 min | (21–25, 20–25, 17–25); Report | | | National Gymnastics Arena, Baku; Attendance: 200; Referees: Michele Brunelli (ITA), Bartlomiej Adamczyk (POL) |
| 25 August 2026; 15:30; Match duration: 1 hr 20 min | Scoring leaders | | | National Gymnastics Arena, Baku; Attendance: 200; Referees: Michele Brunelli (ITA), Bartlomiej Adamczyk (POL) |
| Buterez, Miclaus 9 | | Total | Martin 18 |
| Buterez (9/31) | | Attack | Herbots (17/30) |
| Ariton, Cristea 2 | | Block | Martin 3 |
| Axinte (1/8) | | Serve | Nagels (1/12) |

=== Netherlands vs Spain ===
| 25 August 2026; 18:30; Match duration: 1 hr 5 min | Netherlands | 3–0 | Spain | National Gymnastics Arena, Baku; Attendance: 100; Referees: Dominik Biegajlo (ENG), Erdal Akinci (TUR) |
| 25 August 2026; 18:30; Match duration: 1 hr 5 min | (25–13, 25–11, 25–16); Report | | | National Gymnastics Arena, Baku; Attendance: 100; Referees: Dominik Biegajlo (ENG), Erdal Akinci (TUR) |
| 25 August 2026; 18:30; Match duration: 1 hr 5 min | Scoring leaders | | | National Gymnastics Arena, Baku; Attendance: 100; Referees: Dominik Biegajlo (ENG), Erdal Akinci (TUR) |
| Jasper 12 | | Total | De Paula 10 |
| Jansen (7/19) | | Attack | De Paula (9/32) |
| Jasper 5 | | Block | Hernández 3 |
| Stuut (5/17) | | Serve | De Paula (1/8) |

=== Spain vs Portugal ===
| 26 August 2026; 15:30; Match duration: 2 hr 4 min | Spain | 1–3 | Portugal | National Gymnastics Arena, Baku; Attendance: 300; Referees: Helena Persson (SWE), Michele Brunelli (ITA) |
| 26 August 2026; 15:30; Match duration: 2 hr 4 min | (26–24, 23–25, 19–25, 20–25); Report | | | National Gymnastics Arena, Baku; Attendance: 300; Referees: Helena Persson (SWE), Michele Brunelli (ITA) |
| 26 August 2026; 15:30; Match duration: 2 hr 4 min | Scoring leaders | | | National Gymnastics Arena, Baku; Attendance: 300; Referees: Helena Persson (SWE), Michele Brunelli (ITA) |
| Escamilla 22 | | Total | Kavalenka, Monteiro 19 |
| Escamilla (21/48) | | Attack | Monteiro (18/43) |
| Hernández 2 | | Block | Cavalcanti 4 |
| De Paula, Varela 2 | | Serve | J. Garcez (2/11) |

=== Belgium vs Azerbaijan ===
| 26 August 2026; 18:30; Match duration: 1 hr 26 min | Belgium | 3–0 | Azerbaijan | National Gymnastics Arena, Baku; Attendance: 4,650; Referees: Bartlomiej Adamczyk (POL), Erdal Akinci (TUR) |
| 26 August 2026; 18:30; Match duration: 1 hr 26 min | (25–19, 25–22, 25–23); Report | | | National Gymnastics Arena, Baku; Attendance: 4,650; Referees: Bartlomiej Adamczyk (POL), Erdal Akinci (TUR) |
| 26 August 2026; 18:30; Match duration: 1 hr 26 min | Scoring leaders | | | National Gymnastics Arena, Baku; Attendance: 4,650; Referees: Bartlomiej Adamczyk (POL), Erdal Akinci (TUR) |
| Herbots 22 | | Total | Ruban 19 |
| Herbots (19/47) | | Attack | Ruban (14/48) |
| Fransen 5 | | Block | Ruban 4 |
| Radovic (2/19) | | Serve | Imanova (3/5) |

=== Netherlands vs Belgium ===
| 27 August 2026; 15:30; Match duration: 2 hr 14 min | Netherlands | 2–3 | Belgium | National Gymnastics Arena, Baku; Attendance: 200; Referees: Michele Brunelli (ITA), Erdal Akinci (TUR) |
| 27 August 2026; 15:30; Match duration: 2 hr 14 min | (25–27, 22–25, 25–22, 25–18, 13–15); Report | | | National Gymnastics Arena, Baku; Attendance: 200; Referees: Michele Brunelli (ITA), Erdal Akinci (TUR) |
| 27 August 2026; 15:30; Match duration: 2 hr 14 min | Scoring leaders | | | National Gymnastics Arena, Baku; Attendance: 200; Referees: Michele Brunelli (ITA), Erdal Akinci (TUR) |
| Knollema 23 | | Total | Herbots 30 |
| Dambrink (21/51) | | Attack | Herbots (26/59) |
| Baijens 4 | | Block | Fransen 4 |
| Dambrink, Knollema 1 | | Serve | Herbots (3/23) |

=== Portugal vs Romania ===
| 27 August 2026; 18:30; Match duration: 2 hr 23 min | Portugal | 3–2 | Romania | National Gymnastics Arena, Baku; Attendance: 160; Referees: Dominik Biegajlo (ENG), Helena Persson (SWE) |
| 27 August 2026; 18:30; Match duration: 2 hr 23 min | (15–25, 26–24, 20–25, 27–25, 15–13); Report | | | National Gymnastics Arena, Baku; Attendance: 160; Referees: Dominik Biegajlo (ENG), Helena Persson (SWE) |
| 27 August 2026; 18:30; Match duration: 2 hr 23 min | Scoring leaders | | | National Gymnastics Arena, Baku; Attendance: 160; Referees: Dominik Biegajlo (ENG), Helena Persson (SWE) |
| Monteiro 20 | | Total | Baciu 20 |
| Monteiro (17/46) | | Attack | Baciu (17/50) |
| Cavalcanti, Maia 4 | | Block | Buterez 4 |
| J. Garcez (2/11) | | Serve | Cristea (3/16) |

=== Spain vs Romania ===
| 28 August 2026; 15:30; Match duration: 1 hr 26 min | Spain | 0–3 | Romania | National Gymnastics Arena, Baku; Attendance: 300; Referees: Bartlomiej Adamczyk (POL), Michele Brunelli (ITA) |
| 28 August 2026; 15:30; Match duration: 1 hr 26 min | (19–25, 22–25, 20–25); Report | | | National Gymnastics Arena, Baku; Attendance: 300; Referees: Bartlomiej Adamczyk (POL), Michele Brunelli (ITA) |
| 28 August 2026; 15:30; Match duration: 1 hr 26 min | Scoring leaders | | | National Gymnastics Arena, Baku; Attendance: 300; Referees: Bartlomiej Adamczyk (POL), Michele Brunelli (ITA) |
| De Paula, Varela 11 | | Total | Baciu, Buterez 15 |
| De Paula (11/35) | | Attack | Baciu (12/41) |
| four players 4 | | Block | Buterez 5 |
| Varela (2/8) | | Serve | Baciu (2/12) |

=== Azerbaijan vs Netherlands ===
| 28 August 2026; 18:30; Match duration: 1 hr 42 min | Azerbaijan | 1–3 | Netherlands | National Gymnastics Arena, Baku; Attendance: 5,120; Referees: Erdal Akinci (TUR), Dominik Biegajlo (ENG) |
| 28 August 2026; 18:30; Match duration: 1 hr 42 min | (25–15, 16–25, 22–25, 19–25); Report | | | National Gymnastics Arena, Baku; Attendance: 5,120; Referees: Erdal Akinci (TUR), Dominik Biegajlo (ENG) |
| 28 August 2026; 18:30; Match duration: 1 hr 42 min | Scoring leaders | | | National Gymnastics Arena, Baku; Attendance: 5,120; Referees: Erdal Akinci (TUR), Dominik Biegajlo (ENG) |
| Rahimova 20 | | Total | Dambrink 22 |
| Rahimova (17/50) | | Attack | Dambrink (21/49) |
| Abdulazimova, Rahimova 3 | | Block | Stuut 3 |
| Kirilyuk (1/10) | | Serve | Stuut (4/19) |
