= 2002 FIVB Women's Volleyball World Championship qualification =

24 teams competed in the 2002 FIVB Women's Volleyball World Championship, with two places allocated for the hosts, Germany and the titleholder, Cuba. In the qualification process for the 2002 FIVB World Championship, the Five FIVB confederations were allocated a share of the 22 remaining spots.

== Qualified teams ==
Team	Confederation	Qualified as	Qualified on	Appearance in finals
Germany	CEV	Host		11th^{1}
Cuba	NORCECA	1998 World Championship Winner	12 November 1998	9th
Netherlands	CEV	CEV Pool E Winner	19 June 2001	10th
Czech Republic	CEV	CEV Pool G Winner	24 June 2001	10th^{2}
Russia	CEV	CEV Pool H Winner	24 June 2001	13th^{3}
Poland	CEV	CEV Pool F Winner	26 June 2001	8th
Japan	AVC	AVC Pool C Winner	8 July 2001	12th
Thailand	AVC	AVC Pool C Runner-up	8 July 2001	2nd
Brazil	CSV	CSV Pool M Winner	8 July 2001	12th
Argentina	CSV	CSV Pool M Runner-up	8 July 2001	4th
Dominican Republic	NORCECA	NORCECA Pool K Winner	14 July 2001	4th
Canada	NORCECA	NORCECA Pool K Runner-up	14 July 2001	6th
Kenya	CAVB	CSV Pool A Winner	15 July 2001	3rd
Italy	CEV	CEV Pool I Winner	15 July 2001	7th
United States	NORCECA	NORCECA Pool L Winner	15 July 2001	12th
Puerto Rico	NORCECA	NORCECA Pool L Runner-up	15 July 2001	3rd
Egypt	CAVB	CSV Pool B Winner	5 August 2001	2nd
Greece	CEV	CEV Pool J Winner	29 August 2001	1st
Bulgaria	CEV	CEV Pools E-J Best runner-up	29 August 2001	10th
Romania	CEV	CEV Pools E-J Second best runner-up	29 August 2001	7th
China	AVC	AVC Pool D Winner	2 September 2001	10th
South Korea	AVC	AVC Pool D Runner-up	2 September 2001	9th
Australia	AVC	AVC Pool D Third	2 September 2001	2nd
Mexico	NORCECA	CSV / NORCECA Playoff Winner	9 September 2001	5th

1. Competed as West Germany from 1956 to 1990; 3rd appearance as Germany.
2. Competed as Czechoslovakia from 1952 to 1986; 2nd appearance as Czech Republic.
3. Competed as Soviet Union from 1952 to 1990; 3rd appearance as Russia.

== Confederation qualification processes ==
The distribution by confederation for the 2002 FIVB Women's Volleyball World Championship was:

- Asia and Oceania (AVC): 5 places
- Africa (CAVB): 2 places
- Europe (CEV): 8 places (+ Germany qualified automatically as host nation for a total of 9 places)
- South America (CSV) 2.5 places
- North, Central America and Caribbean (NORCECA): 4.5 places (+ Cuba qualified automatically as the defending champions for a total of 5.5 places)

== Africa ==
9 national teams entered qualification. (South Africa and Ghana later withdrew) The teams were distributed according to their position in the FIVB Senior Women's Rankings. Teams ranked 1–7 automatically qualified for the second round.

Sub Pool A	Pool A	Pool B
Namibia; ~~South Africa~~	Tunisia; Cameroon; Kenya; 1st Sub Pool A	Egypt; Nigeria; Morocco; ~~Ghana~~

=== Pool A ===
- Venue: Nairobi, Kenya
- Dates: July 13–15, 2001

Pos	Team	Pld	W	L	Pts	SW	SL	SR	SPW	SPL	SPR
1	Kenya	3	3	0	6	9	0	MAX	228	131	1.740
2	Tunisia	3	2	1	5	6	3	2.000	222	155	1.432
3	Cameroon	3	1	2	4	3	6	0.500	169	177	0.955
4	Namibia	3	0	3	3	0	9	0.000	69	225	0.307

Date		Score		Set 1	Set 2	Set 3	Set 4	Set 5	Total
13 Jul	Tunisia	3–0	Cameroon	25–15	25–14	25–22			75–51
13 Jul	Kenya	3–0	Namibia	25–5	25–4	25–7			75–16
14 Jul	Namibia	0–3	Tunisia	8–25	3–25	15–25			26–75
14 Jul	Cameroon	0–3	Kenya	15–25	14–25	14–25			43–75
15 Jul	Namibia	0–3	Cameroon	5–25	12–25	10–25			27–75
15 Jul	Kenya	3–0	Tunisia	25–23	28–26	25–23			78–72

=== Pool B ===
- Venue: Cairo, Egypt
- Dates: August 3–5, 2001

Pos	Team	Pld	W	L	Pts	SW	SL	SR	SPW	SPL	SPR
1	Egypt	2	2	0	4	6	2	3.000	189	170	1.112
2	Nigeria	2	1	1	3	4	5	0.800	187	179	1.045
3	Morocco	2	0	2	2	3	6	0.500	175	202	0.866

Date		Score		Set 1	Set 2	Set 3	Set 4	Set 5	Total
03 Aug	Egypt	3–1	Morocco	19–25	28–26	25–18	25–19		97–88
04 Aug	Morocco	2–3	Nigeria	25–21	16–25	25–19	12–25	9–15	87–105
05 Aug	Egypt	3–1	Nigeria	17–25	25–23	25–21	25–13		92–82

== Asia and Oceania ==
9 national teams entered qualification. The teams were distributed according to their position in the FIVB Senior Women's Rankings. Teams ranked 1–6 automatically qualified for the second round.

Sub Pool B	Pool C	Pool D
Kazakhstan; Uzbekistan; Sri Lanka	Thailand; Japan; Chinese Taipei; 2nd Sub Pool B	China; South Korea; Australia; 1st Sub Pool B

=== Sub Pool B ===
- Venue: Colombo, Sri Lanka
- Dates: January 18–20, 2001

Pos	Team	Pld	W	L	Pts	SW	SL	SR	SPW	SPL	SPR
1	Kazakhstan	2	2	0	4	6	1	6.000	165	131	1.260
2	Uzbekistan	2	1	1	3	4	3	1.333	158	146	1.082
3	Sri Lanka	2	0	2	2	0	6	0.000	104	150	0.693

Date		Score		Set 1	Set 2	Set 3	Set 4	Set 5	Total
18 Jan	Uzbekistan	1–3	Kazakhstan	25–15	19–25	17–25	22–25		83–90
19 Jan	Uzbekistan	3–0	Sri Lanka	25–19	25–21	25–16			75–56
20 Jan	Kazakhstan	3–0	Sri Lanka	25–11	25–18	25–19			75–48

=== Pool C ===
- Venue: Bangkok, Thailand
- Dates: July 6–8, 2001

Pos	Team	Pld	W	L	Pts	SW	SL	SR	SPW	SPL	SPR
1	Japan	3	3	0	6	9	0	MAX	225	129	1.744
2	Thailand	3	2	1	5	6	3	2.000	187	177	1.056
3	Chinese Taipei	3	1	2	4	3	6	0.500	190	195	0.974
4	Uzbekistan	3	0	3	3	0	9	0.000	124	225	0.551

Date		Score		Set 1	Set 2	Set 3	Set 4	Set 5	Total
06 Jul	Chinese Taipei	0–3	Japan	19–25	19–25	18–25			56–75
06 Jul	Thailand	3–0	Uzbekistan	25–19	25–13	25–11			75–43
07 Jul	Thailand	3–0	Chinese Taipei	25–22	25–17	25–20			75–59
07 Jul	Uzbekistan	0–3	Japan	13–25	14–25	9–25			36–75
08 Jul	Chinese Taipei	3–0	Uzbekistan	25–15	25–15	25–15			75–45
08 Jul	Japan	3–0	Thailand	25–13	25–14	25–10			75–37

=== Pool D ===
- Venue: Macau
- Dates: August 31 – September 2, 2001

Pos	Team	Pld	W	L	Pts	SW	SL	SR	SPW	SPL	SPR
1	China	3	3	0	6	9	1	9.000	252	171	1.474
2	South Korea	3	2	1	5	7	3	2.333	238	200	1.190
3	Australia	3	1	2	4	3	8	0.375	221	256	0.863
4	Kazakhstan	3	0	3	3	2	9	0.222	185	269	0.688

Date		Score		Set 1	Set 2	Set 3	Set 4	Set 5	Total
31 Aug	Australia	0–3	South Korea	20–25	15–25	17–25			52–75
31 Aug	China	3–0	Kazakhstan	25–16	25–6	25–11			75–33
01 Sep	South Korea	3–0	Kazakhstan	25–13	25–22	25–11			75–46
01 Sep	China	3–0	Australia	25–22	25–16	25–12			75–50
02 Sep	Australia	3–2	Kazakhstan	22–25	25–11	23–25	32–30	17–15	119–106
02 Sep	China	3–1	South Korea	27–29	25–18	25–23	25–18		102–88

== Europe ==
25 national teams entered qualification. The teams were distributed according to their position in the FIVB Senior Women's Rankings. Teams ranked 1–23 automatically qualified for the second round.

Sub Pool C	Pool E	Pool F	Pool G
Azerbaijan; Israel	Netherlands; Turkey; France; 1st Sub Pool C	Poland; Latvia; Yugoslavia; Slovenia	Portugal; Czech Republic; Spain; Norway
Pool H	Pool I	Pool J	
Russia; Ukraine; Austria; Denmark	Italy; Romania; Hungary; Switzerland	Croatia; Bulgaria; Greece; Finland	

=== Sub Pool C ===
- Venue: Baku, Azerbaijan
- Dates: February 2–3, 2001

Pos	Team	Pld	W	L	Pts	SW	SL	SR	SPW	SPL	SPR
1	Azerbaijan	2	2	0	4	6	2	3.000	195	174	1.121
2	Israel	2	0	2	2	2	6	0.333	174	195	0.892

Date		Score		Set 1	Set 2	Set 3	Set 4	Set 5	Total
02 Feb	Azerbaijan	3–0	Israel	25–18	25–23	25–18			75–59
03 Feb	Azerbaijan	3–2	Israel	32–34	25–22	23–25	25–21	15–13	120–115

=== Pool E ===
- Venue: 's-Hertogenbosch, Netherlands
- Dates: June 17–19, 2001

Pos	Team	Pld	W	L	Pts	SW	SL	SR	SPW	SPL	SPR
1	Netherlands	3	3	0	6	9	4	2.250	295	276	1.069
2	Azerbaijan	3	2	1	5	8	4	2.000	281	255	1.102
3	Turkey	3	1	2	4	6	8	0.750	301	325	0.926
4	France	3	0	3	3	2	9	0.222	241	262	0.920

Date		Score		Set 1	Set 2	Set 3	Set 4	Set 5	Total
17 Jun	Turkey	3–2	France	23–25	17–25	28–26	25–20	19–17	112–113
17 Jun	Netherlands	3–2	Azerbaijan	24–26	25–23	17–25	25–22	15–12	106–108
18 Jun	Azerbaijan	3–1	Turkey	25–20	22–25	25–17	26–24		98–86
18 Jun	France	0–3	Netherlands	20–25	22–25	23–25			65–75
19 Jun	Azerbaijan	3–0	France	25–23	25–18	25–22			75–63
19 Jun	Netherlands	3–2	Turkey	25–16	28–30	21–25	25–20	15–12	114–103

=== Pool F ===
- Venue: Opole, Poland
- Dates: June 24–26, 2001

Pos	Team	Pld	W	L	Pts	SW	SL	SR	SPW	SPL	SPR
1	Poland	3	3	0	6	9	0	MAX	225	163	1.380
2	Yugoslavia	3	2	1	5	6	5	1.200	251	222	1.131
3	Slovenia	3	1	2	4	3	6	0.500	191	200	0.955
4	Latvia	3	0	3	3	2	9	0.222	185	267	0.693

Date		Score		Set 1	Set 2	Set 3	Set 4	Set 5	Total
24 Jun	Yugoslavia	3–0	Slovenia	25–16	25–15	25–22			75–53
24 Jun	Poland	3–0	Latvia	25–16	25–10	25–15			75–41
25 Jun	Latvia	0–3	Slovenia	12–25	18–25	20–25			50–75
25 Jun	Poland	3–0	Yugoslavia	25–23	25–15	25–21			75–59
26 Jun	Yugoslavia	3–2	Latvia	23–25	25–18	29–31	25–12	15–8	117–94
26 Jun	Slovenia	0–3	Poland	19–25	22–25	22–25			63–75

=== Pool G ===
- Venue: Lisbon, Portugal
- Dates: June 22–24, 2001

Pos	Team	Pld	W	L	Pts	SW	SL	SR	SPW	SPL	SPR
1	Czech Republic	3	3	0	6	9	2	4.500	261	194	1.345
2	Spain	3	2	1	5	8	4	2.000	272	238	1.143
3	Portugal	3	1	2	4	3	7	0.429	218	237	0.920
4	Norway	3	0	3	3	2	9	0.222	189	271	0.697

Date		Score		Set 1	Set 2	Set 3	Set 4	Set 5	Total
22 Jun	Norway	1–3	Spain	16–25	25–22	13–25	8–25		62–97
22 Jun	Portugal	0–3	Czech Republic	9–25	24–26	20–25			53–76
23 Jun	Spain	2–3	Czech Republic	25–23	20–25	18–25	25–22	11–15	99–110
23 Jun	Norway	1–3	Portugal	25–22	13–25	22–25	25–27		85–99
24 Jun	Portugal	0–3	Spain	22–25	24–26	20–25			66–76
24 Jun	Czech Republic	3–0	Norway	25–15	25–12	25–15			75–42

=== Pool H ===
- Venue: Novy Urengoy, Russia
- Dates: June 22–24, 2001

Pos	Team	Pld	W	L	Pts	SW	SL	SR	SPW	SPL	SPR
1	Russia	3	3	0	6	9	0	MAX	228	147	1.551
2	Ukraine	3	2	1	5	6	3	2.000	211	142	1.486
3	Denmark	3	1	2	4	3	6	0.500	168	209	0.804
4	Austria	3	0	3	3	0	9	0.000	116	225	0.516

Date		Score		Set 1	Set 2	Set 3	Set 4	Set 5	Total
22 Jun	Ukraine	3–0	Austria	25–6	25–4	25–7			75–17
22 Jun	Russia	3–0	Denmark	25–13	25–21	25–12			75–46
23 Jun	Denmark	3–0	Austria	25–19	25–18	25–22			75–59
23 Jun	Russia	3–0	Ukraine	25–19	28–26	25–16			78–61
24 Jun	Ukraine	3–0	Denmark	25–12	25–18	25–17			75–47
24 Jun	Austria	0–3	Russia	19–25	12–25	9–25			40–75

=== Pool I ===
- Venue: Urbino, Italy
- Dates: July 13–15, 2001

Pos	Team	Pld	W	L	Pts	SW	SL	SR	SPW	SPL	SPR
1	Italy	3	3	0	6	9	1	9.000	246	153	1.608
2	Romania	3	2	1	5	7	3	2.333	223	196	1.138
3	Hungary	3	1	2	4	3	6	0.500	173	196	0.883
4	Switzerland	3	0	3	3	0	9	0.000	128	225	0.569

Date		Score		Set 1	Set 2	Set 3	Set 4	Set 5	Total
13 Jul	Italy	3–0	Switzerland	25–18	25–9	25–10			75–37
13 Jul	Hungary	0–3	Romania	18–25	22–25	15–25			55–75
14 Jul	Romania	3–0	Switzerland	25–17	25–15	25–13			75–45
14 Jul	Italy	3–0	Hungary	25–18	25–16	25–9			75–43
15 Jul	Switzerland	0–3	Hungary	21–25	13–25	12–25			46–75
15 Jul	Italy	3–1	Romania	25–18	21–25	25–13	25–17		96–73

=== Pool J ===
- Venue: Dubrovnik, Croatia
- Dates: August 27–29, 2001

Pos	Team	Pld	W	L	Pts	SW	SL	SR	SPW	SPL	SPR
1	Greece	3	3	0	6	9	4	2.250	294	268	1.097
2	Bulgaria	3	2	1	5	8	3	2.667	243	210	1.157
3	Croatia	3	1	2	4	4	7	0.571	242	254	0.953
4	Finland	3	0	3	3	2	9	0.222	218	265	0.823

Date		Score		Set 1	Set 2	Set 3	Set 4	Set 5	Total
27 Aug	Bulgaria	2–3	Greece	25–15	15–25	19–25	25–19	9–15	93–99
27 Aug	Croatia	3–1	Finland	21–25	25–15	25–19	25–19		96–78
28 Aug	Bulgaria	3–0	Finland	25–19	25–17	25–23			75–59
28 Aug	Croatia	1–3	Greece	33–35	25–15	12–25	24–26		94–101
29 Aug	Finland	1–3	Greece	19–25	25–19	20–25	17–25		81–94
29 Aug	Croatia	0–3	Bulgaria	18–25	20–25	14–25			52–75

=== Second placed teams ===
Pos	Team	Pld	W	L	Pts	SW	SL	SR	SPW	SPL	SPR
1	Bulgaria	3	2	1	5	8	3	2.667	243	210	1.157
2	Romania	3	2	1	5	7	3	2.333	223	196	1.138
3	Ukraine	3	2	1	5	6	3	2.000	211	142	1.486
4	Spain	3	2	1	5	8	4	2.000	272	238	1.143
5	Azerbaijan	3	2	1	5	8	4	2.000	281	255	1.102
6	Yugoslavia	3	2	1	5	6	5	1.200	251	222	1.131

== North, Central America and Caribbean ==
10 national teams entered qualification. The teams were distributed according to their position in the FIVB Senior Women's Rankings. Teams ranked 1–7 automatically qualified for the second round.

Sub Pool D	Pool K	Pool L
Aruba; Jamaica; Netherlands Antilles	Dominican Republic; Canada; Barbados; 1st Sub Pool D	Puerto Rico; United States; Mexico; Costa Rica

=== Sub Pool D ===
- Venue: Oranjestad, Aruba
- Dates: June 14–16, 2001

Pos	Team	Pld	W	L	Pts	SW	SL	SR	SPW	SPL	SPR
1	Jamaica	2	1	1	3	5	3	1.667	168	167	1.006
2	Netherlands Antilles	2	1	1	3	4	5	0.800	185	181	1.022
3	Aruba	2	1	1	3	3	4	0.750	155	160	0.969

Date		Score		Set 1	Set 2	Set 3	Set 4	Set 5	Total
14 Jun	Aruba	0–3	Jamaica	26–28	22–25	16–25			64–78
15 Jun	Jamaica	2–3	Netherlands Antilles	25–18	19–25	13–25	25–20	8–15	90–103
16 Jun	Aruba	3–1	Netherlands Antilles	15–25	25–17	25–16	26–24		91–82

=== Pool K ===
- Venue: Santo Domingo, Dominican Republic
- Dates: July 12–14, 2001

Pos	Team	Pld	W	L	Pts	SW	SL	SR	SPW	SPL	SPR
1	Dominican Republic	3	3	0	6	9	1	9.000	247	129	1.915
2	Canada	3	2	1	5	7	3	2.333	228	177	1.288
3	Barbados	3	1	2	4	3	8	0.375	178	239	0.745
4	Jamaica	3	0	3	3	2	9	0.222	147	255	0.576

Date		Score		Set 1	Set 2	Set 3	Set 4	Set 5	Total
12 Jul	Canada	3–0	Jamaica	25–13	25–14	25–12			75–39
12 Jul	Dominican Republic	3–0	Barbados	25–8	25–12	25–12			75–32
13 Jul	Canada	3–0	Barbados	25–11	25–14	25–16			75–41
13 Jul	Dominican Republic	3–0	Jamaica	25–12	25–6	25–1			75–19
14 Jul	Barbados	3–2	Jamaica	25–10	14–25	26–28	25–21	15–5	105–89
14 Jul	Dominican Republic	3–1	Canada	25–13	22–25	25–18	25–22		97–78

=== Pool L ===
- Venue: San Juan, Puerto Rico
- Dates: July 13–15, 2001

Pos	Team	Pld	W	L	Pts	SW	SL	SR	SPW	SPL	SPR
1	United States	3	3	0	6	9	0	MAX	225	125	1.800
2	Puerto Rico	3	2	1	5	6	4	1.500	225	191	1.178
3	Mexico	3	1	2	4	4	6	0.667	183	225	0.813
4	Costa Rica	3	0	3	3	0	9	0.000	133	225	0.591

Date		Score		Set 1	Set 2	Set 3	Set 4	Set 5	Total
13 Jul	Mexico	0–3	United States	9–25	17–25	12–25			38–75
13 Jul	Puerto Rico	3–0	Costa Rica	25–23	25–10	25–13			75–46
14 Jul	United States	3–0	Costa Rica	25–13	25–10	25–11			75–34
14 Jul	Mexico	1–3	Puerto Rico	25–22	16–25	15–25	14–25		70–97
15 Jul	Costa Rica	0–3	Mexico	16–25	19–25	18–25			53–75
15 Jul	United States	3–0	Puerto Rico	25–23	25–16	25–14			75–53

=== Third placed teams ===
Pos	Team	Pld	W	L	Pts	SW	SL	SR	SPW	SPL	SPR
1	Mexico	3	1	2	4	4	6	0.667	183	225	0.813
2	Barbados	3	1	2	4	3	8	0.375	178	239	0.745

== South America ==
6 national teams entered qualification. (Uruguay and Chile later withdrew) The teams were distributed according to their position in the FIVB Senior Women's Rankings. Teams ranked 1–3 automatically qualified for the second round.

Sub Pool E	Pool M
Venezuela; ~~Uruguay~~; ~~Chile~~	Argentina; Brazil; Peru; 1st Sub Pool E

=== Pool M ===
- Venue: Santa Fe, Argentina
- Dates: July 6–8, 2001

Pos	Team	Pld	W	L	Pts	SW	SL	SR	SPW	SPL	SPR
1	Brazil	3	3	0	6	9	0	MAX	228	153	1.490
2	Argentina	3	2	1	5	6	3	2.000	211	169	1.249
3	Venezuela	3	1	2	4	3	7	0.429	191	228	0.838
4	Peru	3	0	3	3	1	9	0.111	157	237	0.662

Date		Score		Set 1	Set 2	Set 3	Set 4	Set 5	Total
06 Jul	Brazil	3–0	Peru	25–14	25–9	25–13			75–36
06 Jul	Argentina	3–0	Venezuela	25–16	25–14	25–18			75–48
07 Jul	Venezuela	3–1	Peru	25–23	12–25	25–11	25–19		87–78
07 Jul	Brazil	3–0	Argentina	28–26	25–18	25–17			78–61
08 Jul	Venezuela	0–3	Brazil	23–25	21–25	12–25			56–75
08 Jul	Argentina	3–0	Peru	25–16	25–13	25–14			75–43

== Playoff ==
- Venue: Monterrey, Mexico
- Dates: September 7–9, 2001

Pos	Team	Pld	W	L	Pts	SW	SL	SR	SPW	SPL	SPR
1	Mexico	3	2	1	5	6	5	1.200	257	256	1.004
2	Venezuela	3	1	2	4	5	6	0.833	256	257	0.996

Date		Score		Set 1	Set 2	Set 3	Set 4	Set 5	Total
07 Sep	Venezuela	3–0	Mexico	26–24	25–19	25–23			76–66
08 Sep	Mexico	3–2	Venezuela	26–24	22–25	19–25	29–27	16–14	112–115
09 Sep	Mexico	3–0	Venezuela	25–18	29–27	25–20			79–65
