= 2026 Women's European Volleyball Championship qualification =

Volleyball Championship qualifiers

This article describes the qualification for the 2026 Women's European Volleyball Championship.

== Qualification ==
Azerbaijan, Czech Republic, Sweden and Turkey as host countries were directly qualified. The eight best placed teams at the 2023 edition also gained direct entries into the tournament. 21 teams compete for the remaining 12 places at the final tournament.

Means of qualification	Qualifier	Means of qualification		Qualifier
Host Countries	Azerbaijan	Qualification	Pool A	Germany
Host Countries	Czech Republic	Qualification	Pool B	Belgium
Host Countries	Sweden	Qualification	Pool C	Slovenia
Host Countries	Turkey	Qualification	Pool D	Montenegro
2023 European Championship	Serbia	Qualification	Pool E	Spain
2023 European Championship	Netherlands	Qualification	Pool F	Greece
2023 European Championship	Italy	Qualification	Pool G	Croatia
2023 European Championship	Poland	Qualification	Best runners-up	Romania
2023 European Championship	France	Qualification	Best runners-up	Hungary
2023 European Championship	Bulgaria	Qualification	Best runners-up	Portugal
2023 European Championship	Ukraine	Qualification	Best runners-up	Latvia
2023 European Championship	Slovakia	Qualification	Best runners-up	Austria
Total 24

== Direct qualification ==
All of the hosted countries' teams directly qualified for the tournament. Then, the top eight teams from previous edition also automatically qualified.

- 2023 Women's European Volleyball Championship final standing

Qualified for the 2026 European Championship
Qualified as hosts for the 2026 European Championship

Rank	Team
1st place, gold medalist(s)	Turkey
2nd place, silver medalist(s)	Serbia
3rd place, bronze medalist(s)	Netherlands
4	Italy
5	Poland
6	France
7	Bulgaria
8	Czech Republic
9	Ukraine
10	Slovakia
11	Romania
12	Germany
13	Spain
14	Switzerland
15	Belgium
16	Sweden
17	Azerbaijan
18	Bosnia and Herzegovina
19	Greece
20	Slovenia
21	Finland
22	Croatia
23	Estonia
24	Hungary

== Format ==
There being seven pools of either three teams each, the winners of each pool and the 5 best runners-up qualified for the 2026 European Championship. The pools were played in a double round-robin.

=== Schedule ===
Original schedule
Round	Round date
Matchday 1	17/18 August 2024
Matchday 2	24/25 August 2024
Matchday 3	31 August–1 September 2024
Matchday 4	19/20 July 2025
Matchday 5	26/27 July 2025
Matchday 6	2/3 August 2025

The dates were updated to adapt to the new FIVB calendar.

Round	Round date
Matchday 1	17/18 August 2024
Matchday 2	24/25 August 2024
Matchday 3	28/29 August 2024
Matchday 4	2/3 August 2025
Matchday 5	6 August 2025
Matchday 6	9/10 August 2025

== Pools composition ==
The pools were set following the Serpentine system according to their European Ranking for national teams as of 6 November 2023. Rankings are shown in brackets.

Pool A	Pool B	Pool C	Pool D	Pool E	Pool F	Pool G
Germany (6)	Belgium (10)	Slovenia (13)	Bosnia and Herzegovina (15)	Spain (16)	Greece (17)	Romania (18)
Switzerland (26)	Hungary (25)	Israel (24)	Montenegro (23)	Portugal (22)	Austria (21)	Croatia (19)
Finland (27)	Denmark (28)	Estonia (29)	Latvia (31)	Georgia (32)	North Macedonia (33)	Kosovo (NR)

== Pool standing procedure ==
1. Number of matches won
2. Match points
3. Sets ratio
4. Points ratio
5. If the tie continues as per the point ratio between two teams, the priority will be given to the team which won the last match between them. When the tie in points ratio is between three or more teams, a new classification of these teams in the terms of points 1, 2 and 3 will be made taking into consideration only the matches in which they were opposed to each other.

Match won 3–0 or 3–1: 3 match points for the winner, 0 match points for the loser
Match won 3–2: 2 match points for the winner, 1 match point for the loser

== Results ==
- The winners in each pool and the top five of the second ranked teams qualified for the 2026 European Championship.

=== Pool A ===
Pos	Team	Pld	W	L	Pts	SW	SL	SR	SPW	SPL	SPR	Qualification
1	Germany	4	3	1	9	10	3	3.333	327	257	1.272	2026 European Championship
2	Finland	4	2	2	6	8	9	0.889	368	367	1.003	
3	Switzerland	4	1	3	3	5	11	0.455	310	381	0.814	

Source: CEV

Date	Time		Score		Set 1	Set 2	Set 3	Set 4	Set 5	Total	Report
18 Aug 2024	15:00	Finland	2–3	Switzerland	25–18	26–28	23–25	25–17	12–15	111–103	Report
24 Aug 2024	17:00	Switzerland	0–3	Germany	36–38	18–25	9–25			63–88	Report
29 Aug 2024	18:00	Germany	3–0	Finland	25–20	25–20	25–15			75–55	Report
2 Aug 2025	14:00	Finland	3–1	Germany	25–21	25–18	18–25	27–25		95–89	Report
6 Aug 2025	19:00	Germany	3–0	Switzerland	25–10	25–17	25–17			75–44	Report
10 Aug 2025	16:00	Switzerland	2–3	Finland	25–19	15–25	21–25	25–22	14–16	100–107	Report

=== Pool B ===
Pos	Team	Pld	W	L	Pts	SW	SL	SR	SPW	SPL	SPR	Qualification
1	Belgium	4	3	1	9	9	3	3.000	286	241	1.187	2026 European Championship
2	Hungary	4	3	1	8	9	5	1.800	310	273	1.136	2026 European Championship
3	Denmark	4	0	4	1	2	12	0.167	252	334	0.754	

Source: CEV

Date	Time		Score		Set 1	Set 2	Set 3	Set 4	Set 5	Total	Report
17 Aug 2024	19:00	Denmark	2–3	Hungary	28–26	18–25	25–17	16–25	9–15	96–108	Report
24 Aug 2024	18:30	Hungary	3–0	Belgium	25–22	25–18	25–20			75–60	Report
28 Aug 2024	20:30	Belgium	3–0	Denmark	25–19	25–17	25–23			75–59	Report
3 Aug 2025	17:00	Denmark	0–3	Belgium	16–25	24–26	15–25			55–76	Report
6 Aug 2025	20:00	Belgium	3–0	Hungary	25–13	25–19	25–20			75–52	Report
10 Aug 2025	18:00	Hungary	3–0	Denmark	25–13	25–14	25–15			75–42	Report

=== Pool C ===
Pos	Team	Pld	W	L	Pts	SW	SL	SR	SPW	SPL	SPR	Qualification
1	Slovenia	4	4	0	12	12	0	MAX	300	195	1.538	2026 European Championship
2	Israel	4	2	2	6	6	7	0.857	266	293	0.908	
3	Estonia	4	0	4	0	1	12	0.083	240	318	0.755	

Source: CEV

Date	Time		Score		Set 1	Set 2	Set 3	Set 4	Set 5	Total	Report
17 Aug 2024	16:00	Estonia	1–3	Israel	23–25	18–25	25–18	21–25		87–93	Report
27 Aug 2024	19:00	Slovenia	3–0	Israel	25–19	25–13	25–15			75–47	Report
29 Aug 2024	19:00	Slovenia	3–0	Estonia	25–21	25–16	25–17			75–54	Report
2 Aug 2025	17:00	Estonia	0–3	Slovenia	10–25	16–25	17–25			43–75	Report
6 Aug 2025	20:00	Israel	0–3	Slovenia	18–25	17–25	16–25			51–75	Report
9 Aug 2025	20:00	Israel	3–0	Estonia	25–18	25–23	25–15			75–56	Report

=== Pool D ===
Pos	Team	Pld	W	L	Pts	SW	SL	SR	SPW	SPL	SPR	Qualification
1	Montenegro	4	3	1	10	11	4	2.750	350	264	1.326	2026 European Championship
2	Latvia	4	2	2	6	9	8	1.125	381	310	1.229	2026 European Championship
3	Bosnia and Herzegovina	4	1	3	2	3	11	0.273	176	333	0.529	

Source: CEV

Date	Time		Score		Set 1	Set 2	Set 3	Set 4	Set 5	Total	Report
17 Aug 2024	16:15	Latvia	3–2	Montenegro	26–24	25–19	24–26	23–25	15–9	113–103	Report
25 Aug 2024	20:00	Montenegro	3–0	Bosnia and Herzegovina	25–0	25–0	25–0			75–0	Report
28 Aug 2024	20:15	Bosnia and Herzegovina	0–3	Latvia	0–25	0–25	0–25			0–75	Report
2 Aug 2025	20:00	Latvia	2–3	Bosnia and Herzegovina	25–23	19–25	25–23	24–26	13–15	106–112	Report
6 Aug 2025	19:30	Bosnia and Herzegovina	0–3	Montenegro	24–26	16–25	24–26			64–77	Report
10 Aug 2025	19:00	Montenegro	3–1	Latvia	20–25	25–20	25–23	25–19		95–87	Report

=== Pool E ===
Pos	Team	Pld	W	L	Pts	SW	SL	SR	SPW	SPL	SPR	Qualification
1	Spain	4	4	0	11	12	2	6.000	333	236	1.411	2026 European Championship
2	Portugal	4	2	2	7	8	6	1.333	309	287	1.077	2026 European Championship
3	Georgia	4	0	4	0	0	12	0.000	181	300	0.603	

Source: CEV

Date	Time		Score		Set 1	Set 2	Set 3	Set 4	Set 5	Total	Report
17 Aug 2024	19:00	Georgia	0–3	Portugal	23–25	18–25	21–25			62–75	Report
25 Aug 2024	17:00	Portugal	0–3	Spain	20–25	22–25	21–25			63–75	Report
28 Aug 2024	17:00	Spain	3–0	Georgia	25–9	25–8	25–12			75–29	Report
2 Aug 2025	19:00	Georgia	0–3	Spain	19–25	14–25	15–25			48–75	Report
6 Aug 2025	19:30	Spain	3–2	Portugal	25–18	20–25	25–20	23–25	15–8	108–96	Report
10 Aug 2025	17:00	Portugal	3–0	Georgia	25–8	25–16	25–18			75–42	Report

=== Pool F ===
Pos	Team	Pld	W	L	Pts	SW	SL	SR	SPW	SPL	SPR	Qualification
1	Greece	4	4	0	12	12	1	12.000	318	204	1.559	2026 European Championship
2	Austria	4	2	2	6	7	6	1.167	283	271	1.044	2026 European Championship
3	North Macedonia	4	0	4	0	0	12	0.000	174	300	0.580	

Source: CEV

Date	Time		Score		Set 1	Set 2	Set 3	Set 4	Set 5	Total	Report
17 Aug 2024	20:15	North Macedonia	0–3	Austria	14–25	17–25	20–25			51–75	Report
25 Aug 2024	20:20	Austria	0–3	Greece	18–25	20–25	23–25			61–75	Report
28 Aug 2024	20:30	Greece	3–0	North Macedonia	25–8	25–14	25–11			75–33	Report
3 Aug 2025	20:00	North Macedonia	0–3	Greece	8–25	11–25	19–25			38–75	Report
6 Aug 2025	20:00	Greece	3–1	Austria	25–19	25–14	18–25	25–14		93–72	Report
9 Aug 2025	17:35	Austria	3–0	North Macedonia	25–19	25–23	25–10			75–52	Report

=== Pool G ===
Pos	Team	Pld	W	L	Pts	SW	SL	SR	SPW	SPL	SPR	Qualification
1	Croatia	4	3	1	9	10	3	3.333	313	227	1.379	2026 European Championship
2	Romania	4	3	1	9	9	4	2.250	303	254	1.193	2026 European Championship
3	Kosovo	4	0	4	0	0	12	0.000	165	300	0.550	

Source: CEV

Date	Time		Score		Set 1	Set 2	Set 3	Set 4	Set 5	Total	Report
17 Aug 2024	20:00	Kosovo	0–3	Croatia	16–25	18–25	9–25			43–75	Report
24 Aug 2024	18:00	Croatia	3–0	Romania	25–19	25–14	25–22			75–55	Report
29 Aug 2024	18:00	Romania	3–0	Kosovo	25–13	25–16	25–14			75–43	Report
2 Aug 2025	20:30	Kosovo	0–3	Romania	12–25	20–25	16–25			48–75	Report
6 Aug 2025	18:00	Romania	3–1	Croatia	22–25	25–21	26–24	25–18		98–88	Report
9 Aug 2025	19:00	Croatia	3–0	Kosovo	25–8	25–12	25–11			75–31	Report

=== Ranking of the second placed teams ===
- The top five of the second placed teams qualified for the 2026 European Championship.

Pos	Team	Pld	W	L	Pts	SW	SL	SR	SPW	SPL	SPR	Qualification
1	Romania	4	3	1	9	9	4	2.250	303	254	1.193	2026 European Championship
2	Hungary	4	3	1	8	9	5	1.800	310	273	1.136	2026 European Championship
3	Portugal	4	2	2	7	8	6	1.333	309	287	1.077	2026 European Championship
4	Latvia	4	2	2	6	9	8	1.125	381	310	1.229	2026 European Championship
5	Austria	4	2	2	6	7	6	1.167	283	271	1.044	2026 European Championship
6	Finland	4	2	2	6	8	9	0.889	368	367	1.003	
7	Israel	4	2	2	6	6	7	0.857	266	293	0.908	

Source: CEV

== Controversies ==
=== Bosnia and Herzegovina's temporary withdrawal ===
After withdrawing from the Silver League in the 2024 Women's European Volleyball League, the president of the Volleyball Federation of Bosnia and Herzegovina controversially withdrew the team from the European Championship qualification despite the women's team being named the best Bosnian national team in 2023 and qualifying for two successive European Championships.

When the federation announced this decision, the Volleyball Federation president, Milutin Popović, criticized members of the Armed Forces for internal disagreements in the association and also stated the some board members did not respond to him regarding the organization of a meeting to do with the participation of the Bosnian national teams in 2024. Thus, they only managed to organize a meeting on 7 August, two weeks from Bosnia's first game against Montenegro. Due to the lack of meetings, the federation also failed to get a coach for the qualifiers. Plus, he also alleged that they didn't receive funding from the government via the national lottery.

Following that statement, the Federation vice president, Alija Fatić, responded to Popović by saying that it was not their decision to withdraw, rather it was Popović's choice not to play the qualifiers and is quoted saying ""The real truth is that Popovic is incompetent, he didn't do anything". Fatić also states that, unlike what Popović says, they have had several meetings but conversations about the national team was never on the agenda. The volleyball federation had also reportedly offered to fund the preparations and qualification matches, with the Bosnian Olympic Committee also offering to provide equipment, but Popović rejected this proposal.

President of the volleyball federation, Miloš Jelčić, further reiterated Fatić's claim while also mentioning that other athletes like swimmer Lana Pudar and her coaches have the same issues with Popović too.

On 28 August 2024, the Bosnian volleyball federation denied media reports regarding their finances.

In Popović's statement, he reportedly asked the CEV, if they receive the approval from group opponents Montenegro and Latvia, they would like to postpone their qualifiers for 2025. However, this seems unlikely.

It is likely that the Bosnian volleyball federation will be fined 50,000 Euros and suspended from national team competitions for two years due to their no-show in the qualifiers.

Bosnia and Herzegovina returned to the competition on 2 Aug 2025.

== See also ==
- 2026 Men's European Volleyball Championship qualification
