= 2020 Women's European Volleyball League =

European volleyball tournament

2020 Women's European League
Tournament details
- Host country: Bulgaria
- Dates: Cancelled; 22 May – 21 June
- Teams: 18

The 2020 Women's European Volleyball League was originally to be held as the 12th edition of the annual Women's European Volleyball League, which features women's national volleyball teams from 18 European countries. The tournament was cancelled due to the COVID-19 pandemic by the CEV Board of Administration decision taken on 23 April 2020.

The tournament has two divisions: the Golden League, featuring twelve teams, and the Silver League, featuring six teams.

== Pools composition ==
Teams were seeded following the Serpentine system according to their European Ranking for national teams as of September 2019. Rankings are shown in brackets.

=== Golden league ===
Pool A	Pool B	Pool C
Bulgaria (7)	Croatia (10)	Azerbaijan (11)
Hungary (14)	Czech Republic (13)	Ukraine (12)
Belarus (14)	Slovakia (16)	Spain (17)
France (19)	Finland (19)	Romania (18)

=== Silver league ===
Pool A	Pool B
Slovenia (21)	Greece (22)
Estonia (28)	Portugal (22)
Bosnia and Herzegovina (29)	Latvia (31)

== Pool standing procedure ==
1. Total number of victories (matches won, matches lost)
2. In the event of a tie, the following first tiebreaker will apply: The teams will be ranked by the most point gained per match as follows:
  - Match won 3–0 or 3–1: 3 points for the winner, 0 points for the loser
  - Match won 3–2: 2 points for the winner, 1 point for the loser
  - Match forfeited: 3 points for the winner, 0 points (0–25, 0–25, 0–25) for the loser
3. If teams are still tied after examining the number of victories and points gained, then the FIVB will examine the results in order to break the tie in the following order:
  - Set quotient: if two or more teams are tied on the number of points gained, they will be ranked by the quotient resulting from the division of the number of all set won by the number of all sets lost.
  - Points quotient: if the tie persists based on the set quotient, the teams will be ranked by the quotient resulting from the division of all points scored by the total of points lost during all sets.
  - If the tie persists based on the point quotient, the tie will be broken based on the team that won the match of the Round Robin Phase between the tied teams. When the tie in point quotient is between three or more teams, these teams ranked taking into consideration only the matches involving the teams in question.

== Golden league ==
- All times are local.

=== Pool A ===
Pos	Team	Pld	W	L	Pts	SW	SL	SR	SPW	SPL	SPR	Qualification
1	Bulgaria (Note: Qualified as hosts) (H)	0	0	0	0	0	0	—	0	0	—	Final round
2	Hungary	0	0	0	0	0	0	—	0	0	—	
3	Belarus	0	0	0	0	0	0	—	0	0	—	
4	France	0	0	0	0	0	0	—	0	0	—	

(H) Host
Notes:

Date	Time		Score		Set 1	Set 2	Set 3	Set 4	Set 5	Total	Report
24 May	17:00	Hungary	–	France	–	–	–			0–0	Report
24 May	18:00	Bulgaria	–	Belarus	–	–	–			0–0	Report
27 May	17:00	Belarus	–	France	–	–	–			0–0	Report
27 May	19:00	Hungary	–	Bulgaria	–	–	–			0–0	Report
30 May	17:00	Belarus	–	Hungary	–	–	–			0–0	Report
31 May	18:30	Bulgaria	–	France	–	–	–			0–0	Report
6 Jun	17:00	Belarus	–	Bulgaria	–	–	–			0–0	Report
6 Jun	19:00	France	–	Hungary	–	–	–			0–0	Report
10 Jun	18:30	Bulgaria	–	Hungary	–	–	–			0–0	Report
10 Jun	20:00	France	–	Belarus	–	–	–			0–0	Report
13 Jun	18:00	Hungary	–	Belarus	–	–	–			0–0	Report
13 Jun	19:00	France	–	Bulgaria	–	–	–			0–0	Report

=== Pool B ===
Pos	Team	Pld	W	L	Pts	SW	SL	SR	SPW	SPL	SPR
1	Croatia	0	0	0	0	0	0	—	0	0	—
2	Czech Republic	0	0	0	0	0	0	—	0	0	—
3	Slovakia	0	0	0	0	0	0	—	0	0	—
4	Finland	0	0	0	0	0	0	—	0	0	—

Date	Time		Score		Set 1	Set 2	Set 3	Set 4	Set 5	Total	Report
22 May	17:30	Croatia	–	Slovakia	–	–	–			0–0	Report
24 May	16:00	Finland	–	Czech Republic	–	–	–			0–0	Report
27 May	16:00	Croatia	–	Czech Republic	–	–	–			0–0	Report
27 May	18:00	Finland	–	Slovakia	–	–	–			0–0	Report
30 May	16:00	Czech Republic	–	Finland	–	–	–			0–0	Report
31 May	18:00	Slovakia	–	Croatia	–	–	–			0–0	Report
6 Jun	18:00	Slovakia	–	Czech Republic	–	–	–			0–0	Report
6 Jun	19:00	Finland	–	Croatia	–	–	–			0–0	Report
10 Jun	16:00	Czech Republic	–	Croatia	–	–	–			0–0	Report
10 Jun	18:00	Slovakia	–	Finland	–	–	–			0–0	Report
13 Jun	16:00	Czech Republic	–	Slovakia	–	–	–			0–0	Report
14 Jun	17:30	Croatia	–	Finland	–	–	–			0–0	Report

=== Pool C ===
Pos	Team	Pld	W	L	Pts	SW	SL	SR	SPW	SPL	SPR
1	Azerbaijan	0	0	0	0	0	0	—	0	0	—
2	Ukraine	0	0	0	0	0	0	—	0	0	—
3	Spain	0	0	0	0	0	0	—	0	0	—
4	Romania	0	0	0	0	0	0	—	0	0	—

Date	Time		Score		Set 1	Set 2	Set 3	Set 4	Set 5	Total	Report
23 May	16:30	Ukraine	–	Spain	–	–	–			0–0	Report
23 May	18:00	Azerbaijan	–	Romania	–	–	–			0–0	Report
27 May	17:00	Romania	–	Spain	–	–	–			0–0	Report
27 May	18:00	Azerbaijan	–	Ukraine	–	–	–			0–0	Report
31 May	16:30	Ukraine	–	Romania	–	–	–			0–0	Report
31 May	18:00	Spain	–	Azerbaijan	–	–	–			0–0	Report
6 Jun	17:00	Romania	–	Ukraine	–	–	–			0–0	Report
6 Jun	18:00	Azerbaijan	–	Spain	–	–	–			0–0	Report
10 Jun	17:30	Ukraine	–	Azerbaijan	–	–	–			0–0	Report
10 Jun	19:00	Spain	–	Romania	–	–	–			0–0	Report
13 Jun	17:00	Romania	–	Azerbaijan	–	–	–			0–0	Report
13 Jun	19:00	Spain	–	Ukraine	–	–	–			0–0	Report

== Silver league ==
- All times are local.

=== Pool A ===
Pos	Team	Pld	W	L	Pts	SW	SL	SR	SPW	SPL	SPR
1	Slovenia	0	0	0	0	0	0	—	0	0	—
2	Estonia	0	0	0	0	0	0	—	0	0	—
3	Bosnia and Herzegovina	0	0	0	0	0	0	—	0	0	—

Date	Time		Score		Set 1	Set 2	Set 3	Set 4	Set 5	Total	Report
23 May	19:00	Slovenia	–	Bosnia and Herzegovina	–	–	–			0–0	Report
27 May	19:00	Slovenia	–	Estonia	–	–	–			0–0	Report
30 May	20:00	Bosnia and Herzegovina	–	Slovenia	–	–	–			0–0	Report
7 Jun	16:00	Estonia	–	Bosnia and Herzegovina	–	–	–			0–0	Report
10 Jun	17:00	Estonia	–	Slovenia	–	–	–			0–0	Report
13 Jun	17:00	Bosnia and Herzegovina	–	Estonia	–	–	–			0–0	Report

=== Pool B ===
Pos	Team	Pld	W	L	Pts	SW	SL	SR	SPW	SPL	SPR
1	Greece	0	0	0	0	0	0	—	0	0	—
2	Portugal	0	0	0	0	0	0	—	0	0	—
3	Latvia	0	0	0	0	0	0	—	0	0	—

Date	Time		Score		Set 1	Set 2	Set 3	Set 4	Set 5	Total	Report
23 May	13:30	Latvia	–	Greece	–	–	–			0–0	Report
27 May	18:15	Portugal	–	Latvia	–	–	–			0–0	Report
30–31 May		Greece	–	Portugal	–	–	–			0–0	Report
6–7 Jun		Greece	–	Latvia	–	–	–			0–0	Report
10 Jun	16:30	Latvia	–	Portugal	–	–	–			0–0	Report
13 Jun	15:00	Portugal	–	Greece	–	–	–			0–0	Report

== Final round ==
- All times are Central European Summer Time (UTC+02:00).

=== Golden league ===
Semifinals
20 June
20 June

Final
21 June
3rd place match
21 June

==== Semifinals ====
Date	Time	Score	Set 1	Set 2	Set 3	Set 4	Set 5	Total	Report
20 Jun		–	–	–				0–0	
20 Jun		–	–	–				0–0	

==== 3rd place match ====
Date	Time	Score	Set 1	Set 2	Set 3	Set 4	Set 5	Total	Report
21 Jun		–	–	–				0–0	

==== Final ====
Date	Time	Score	Set 1	Set 2	Set 3	Set 4	Set 5	Total	Report
21 Jun		–	–	–				0–0	

=== Silver league ===
==== Final ====
Team 1	Agg.	Team 2	1st leg	2nd leg
	–		–	–

===== Leg 1 =====
Date	Time	Score	Set 1	Set 2	Set 3	Set 4	Set 5	Total	Report
27 Jun		–	–	–				0–0	

===== Leg 2 =====
Date	Time	Score	Set 1	Set 2	Set 3	Set 4	Set 5	Total	Report
28 Jun		–	–	–				0–0	

== See also ==
- 2021 Men's European Volleyball League
