= 2026 Women's European Volleyball Championship =

2026 Voleybol üzrə qadınlararası Avropa Çempionatı (Azerbaijani); Mistrovství Evropy ve volejbale žen 2026 (Czech); Europamästerskapet i volleyboll för damer 2026 (Swedish); 2026 Avrupa Kadınlar Voleybol Şampiyonası (Turkish)
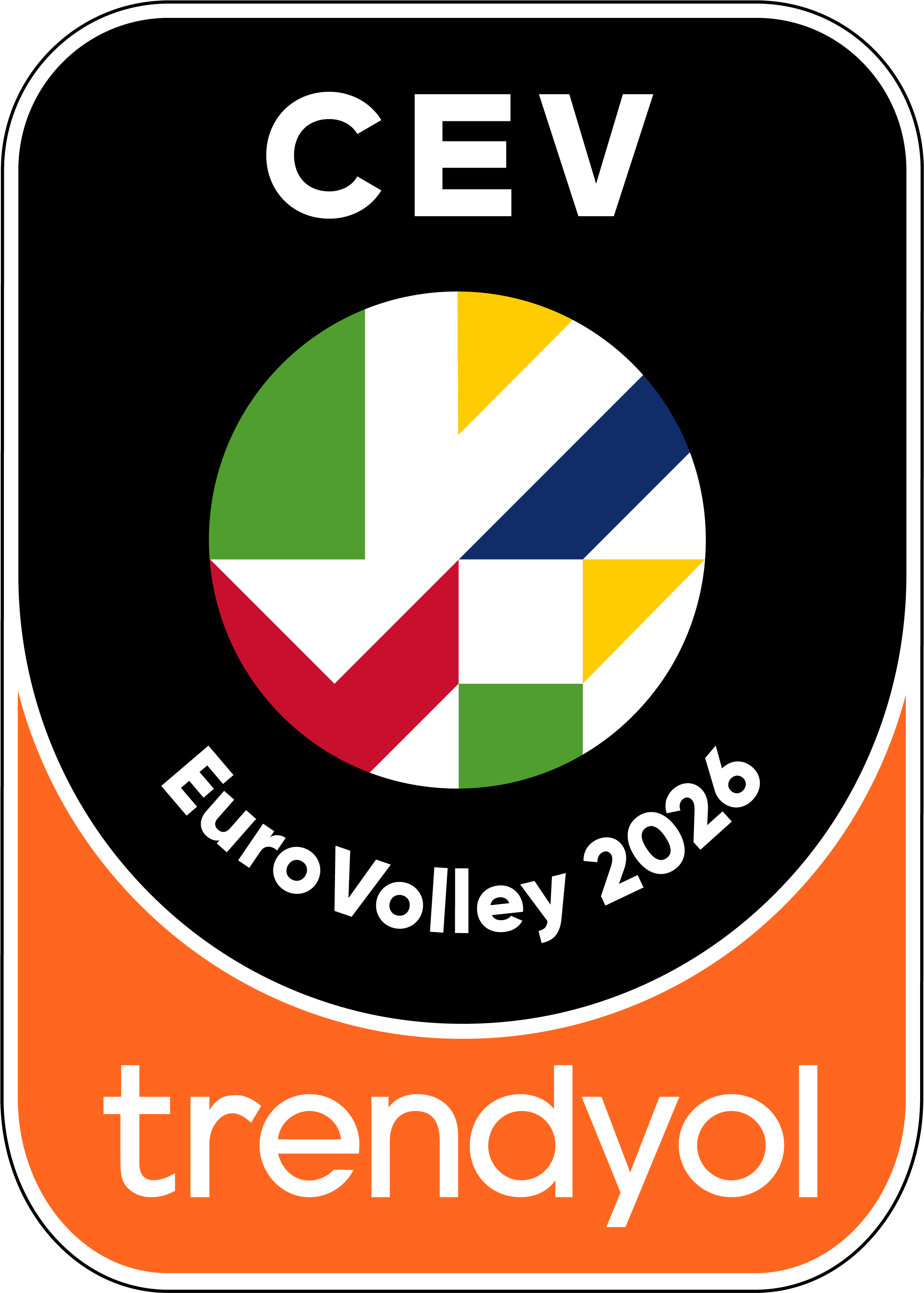

Tournament details
- Host countries: Turkey; Czech Republic; Azerbaijan; Sweden
- Cities: Istanbul; Brno; Baku; Gothenburg
- Dates: 21 August–6 September
- Teams: 24 (from 1 confederation)
- Venue: 4 (in 4 host cities)

Final positions
- Champions: Turkey (2nd title)
- Runners-up: Italy
- Third place: Serbia
- Fourth place: Poland

Tournament awards
- MVP: (Turkey) Melissa Vargas
- Best Setter: (Italy) Alessia Orro
- Best OH: (Italy) Myriam Sylla; (Turkey) Derya Cebecioğlu
- Best MB: (Serbia) Hena Kurtagić; (Turkey) Zehra Güneş
- Best OPP: (Turkey) Melissa Vargas
- Best Libero: (Turkey) Gizem Örge

Tournament statistics
- Matches played: 76
- Attendance: 263,576 (3,468 per match)

The 2026 Women's European Volleyball Championship, commonly referred to as EuroVolley Women 2026 (and the CEV Trendyol EuroVolley 2026 for sponsorship reasons), was the 34th edition of the Women's European Volleyball Championship, a biennial international volleyball tournament organised by European Volleyball Confederation (CEV). The tournament took place between from 21 August to 6 September 2026 across Azerbaijan, the Czech Republic, Sweden, and Turkey, marking the fourth consecutive time EuroVolley has been hosted by four countries since the multi-country hosting system was first used in 2019.

For the fourth time in a row, 24 teams participated in the tournament. Qualification took place in August 2024 and 2025 to decide the final 12 spots. The four co-hosts qualified automatically. Montenegro made their debut, while Austria and Latvia returned after long absences.

After FIVB's calendar changes starting 2025, this was the first European Championship since 1958 to be held in an even-numbered year.

The winner qualified for the Volleyball tournament in the 2028 Summer Olympics in Los Angeles. The top three finishers also qualified for the 2027 FIVB Women's Volleyball World Cup in Canada and United States.

Co-hosts Turkey were the defending champions, having beaten Serbia 3–2 in the final three years earlier, and they successfully retained their title after defeating Italy 3–2 in final, which was held in Istanbul. This was the first time since 2011 that a host nation won the trophy on home soil and the first time that Turkey finally won the title on their home soil, losing both 3–0 to Poland in 2003 final and 3–2 to Serbia in 2019 final, where they were either the hosts or co-hosts.

== Year change ==
On 22 June 2023, the Fédération Internationale de Volleyball (FIVB) announced a comprehensive restructuring of the international calendar for the 2025–2028 cycle. As part of this overhaul, continental championships shifted from odd-numbered years to even-numbered years, beginning in 2026. The structural change was implemented to prioritize athlete health and recovery by reducing calendar congestion, as well as to streamline the qualification pathways for major global tournaments such as the FIVB World Cup and the Olympic Games.

== Host selection ==
- Czech Republic – Czech Republic was announced as the first co-host on 6 December 2023, with games at a new arena in Brno. This will be Czech Republic's third time hosting after 1993 and 1997.
- Sweden – On 6 March 2024, Sweden became the second host with games to take place at the Scandinavium in Gothenburg. This will be Sweden's first time hosting.
- Azerbaijan – On 12 March 2024, Azerbaijan became the third host with one group to be held in the National Gymnastics Arena in Baku. This will be Azerbaijan's second time organising after 2017.
- Turkey – While widely reported to be a host, Turkey was officially announced as the final host on 8 November 2024. According to the Turkish federation, Turkish president, Tayyip Erdoğan, helped get the competition. This will be Turkey's fourth time organising after 1967, 2003 and 2019.

=== Rejected countries ===
The following countries had expressed interest but didn't make the cut:

- Austria – Austria was provisionally given the hosting rights, but after an unknown city unexpectedly withdrew and the Austrian federation reluctant to ask their government for more money due to the government giving money for beach volleyball events, the Austrians asked for a two-week extension on making a decision. At this time as well, the Azerbaijani government had offered to host the group. With the choice to give Austria a two-week extension or giving the event to Azerbaijan, they chose the latter. Austria's only known possible venue was in Vienna.
- Finland – Finland was briefly mentioned as a possible host in November 2022, but this never materialised.

== Preparations ==
=== Tickets ===
Tickets were released on 7 November 2025.

==== Official ticket websites ====
- Official tickets in Azerbaijan
- Official tickets in the Czech Republic
- Official tickets in Sweden
- Official tickets in Turkey

== Qualification ==
Map of qualifiers for the 2026 Women's European Volleyball Championship: Team qualified for 2026 Women's European Volleyball Championship Team failed to qualify Team banned from competition Did not enter

24 teams qualify for the championship. The four co-hosts and the eight best teams from the 2023 edition automatically progress (in the event that one of the best eight teams is also a co-host, the next best team will inherit their place).

21 teams took part in qualification, with 12 spots on the line. The 21 teams were divided into seven groups of three, with the seven group winners plus the five best second place teams qualifying. The games were played in August 2024 and 2025. The groups were divided by the Serpentine system based on each teams' ranking.

Of the 24 teams who qualified, 20 of them were present at the previous tournament. Montenegro are the only debutants, after winning Group D. Austria will return after 55 years, breaking the record for the longest-ever gap for any team between appearances; alongside the record, Austria qualified on merit for the first time. Latvia comes back for the first time since 1997. Portugal advanced for the first time after their debut in 2019.

Of the non-qualifiers, Finland and Switzerland both missed out in Group A, with the two taking part in the three previous editions. Bosnia and Herzegovina didn't qualify after withdrawing from the first half of qualification, causing controversy in the country. 2023 co-hosts, Estonia, failed to qualify as well.

The highest ranked country to not qualify was Switzerland (Note: Russia, ranked 9th was not allowed to take part in qualification due to their suspension caused by the Russian Invasion of Ukraine.), ranked 33rd, while the lowest ranked team to qualify was Latvia, ranked 65th.

As of 2028, this is the last time Switzerland failed to qualify.

Means of qualification	Qualifier	Means of qualification		Qualifier
Host Countries	Azerbaijan	Qualification	Pool A	Germany
Host Countries	Czech Republic	Qualification	Pool B	Belgium
Host Countries	Sweden	Qualification	Pool C	Slovenia
Host Countries	Turkey	Qualification	Pool D	Montenegro
2023 European Championship	Serbia	Qualification	Pool E	Spain
2023 European Championship	Netherlands	Qualification	Pool F	Greece
2023 European Championship	Italy	Qualification	Pool G	Croatia
2023 European Championship	Poland	Qualification	Best runners-up	Romania
2023 European Championship	France	Qualification	Best runners-up	Hungary
2023 European Championship	Bulgaria	Qualification	Best runners-up	Portugal
2023 European Championship	Ukraine	Qualification	Best runners-up	Latvia
2023 European Championship	Slovakia	Qualification	Best runners-up	Austria
Total 24

=== Summary of qualified teams ===
Team	Qualification method	Date of qualification	Appearance(s)				Previous best performance (Note: Bold text indicates they hosted that edition.)	WR (Note: World ranking at start of tournament.)
Team	Qualification method	Date of qualification	Total	First	Last	Streak	Previous best performance	WR
France	Top eight in 2023	26 August 2023	19th	1949	2023	4	4th place (1951)	15
Italy	Top eight in 2023	26 August 2023	28th	1951	2023	23	Champions (2007, 2009, 2021)	1
Turkey (Note: Turkey also belatedly qualified as a 2026 host nation.)	Top eight in 2023	27 August 2023	17th	1963	2023	12	Champions (2023)	3
Netherlands	Top eight in 2023	27 August 2023	31st	1949	2023	18	Champions (1995)	8
Poland	Top eight in 2023	27 August 2023	33rd	1949	2023	16	Champions (2003, 2005)	5
Bulgaria	Top eight in 2023	27 August 2023	32nd	1950	2023	31	Champions (1981)	31
Serbia (Note: The CEV recognizes the Serbian national team as the successor to the Yugoslavia and Serbia and Montenegro sporting achievements and results.)	Top eight in 2023	28 August 2023	20th	1951	2023	10	Champions (2011, 2017, 2019)	10
Czech Republic (Note: The CEV recognizes the Czech Republic as the successor to the Chechoslovakia sporting achievements and results Czech Republic also belatedly qualified as a 2026 host nation.)	Top eight in 2023	28 August 2023	29th	1949	2023	3	Champions (1955)	14
Ukraine	Ninth in 2023	26 September 2023	11th	1993	2023	5	3rd place (1993)	18
Slovakia	Tenth in 2023	6 December 2023	7th	2003	2023	4	12th place (2003, 2019)	35
Sweden	Host nation	6 March 2024	6th	1967	2023	3	8th place (2021)	21
Azerbaijan	Host nation	12 March 2024	11th	2005	2023	11	4th place (2005, 2017)	49
Slovenia	Pool C winner	2 August 2025	4th	2015	2023	2	16th place (2019)	19
Germany	Pool A winner	6 August 2025	18th	1991	2023	18	Runners-up (2011, 2013)	12
Romania	Five best runner-ups	6 August 2025	28th	1949	2023	4	3rd place (1963)	28
Greece	Pool F winner	6 August 2025	8th	1985	2023	4	8th place (1991)	29
Spain	Pool E winner	6 August 2025	9th	2005	2023	4	9th place (2009)	30
Montenegro	Pool D winner	6 August 2025	1st	Debut				47
Belgium	Pool B winner	6 August 2025	13th	1967	2023	7	3rd place (2013)	16
Croatia	Pool G winner	9 August 2025	16th	1993	2023	11	Runners-up (1995, 1997, 1999)	40
Austria	Five best runner-ups	10 August 2025	4th	1958	1971	1	12th place (1958, 1963)	43
Latvia	Five best runner-ups	10 August 2025	4th	1993	1997	1	8th place (1997)	65
Hungary	Five best runner-ups	10 August 2025	20th	1949	2023	6	Runners-up (1975)	26
Portugal	Five best runner-ups	10 August 2025	2nd	2019		1	24th place (2019)	48

== Venues ==
Four venues in four countries will host the tournament. Each venue will host a group, while Istanbul and Brno will organise the knockout stage, with Istanbul hosting the semi-finals and finals. The currently in construction Arena Brno in Brno was supposed to be used for Czech's portion of the tournament, but had to be replaced by the Brno Exhibition Centre due to the arena not being built in time. The Winning Group Arena was also considered as Brno's replacement. This would have been the first major tournament held in Arena Brno.

=== Overview of venues ===
- In Azerbaijan, the National Gymnastics Arena was chosen to host the games. It was constructed in 2009 and has hosted numerous Gymnastics championships, most notably, the 2019 Rhythmic Gymnastics European Championships. The venue has also played host to the 2018 World Judo Championships and events at the 2015 European Games and 2017 Islamic Solidarity Games.
- In Czech Republic, the currently-in-construction Arena Brno was supposed to be hosting the Czech's portion of the tournament, but couldn't host it due to time constraints with its construction. The replacement venue is the venue Brno Exhibition Centre, which recently hosted the 2025 Men's European Volleyball League final four and will have 5,000 temporary seats for the tournament.
- In Sweden, the Scandinavium was chosen as their venue.The facility has accommodated many prestigious European and world championships in many sports, including: Athletics, Aquatics, Figure Skating, Floorball, Handball, Ice Hockey and Tennis. It also hosted the Eurovision Song Contest 1985.
- In Turkey, the country's biggest indoor arena, the Sinan Erdem Dome, hosted the Turkish part of the competition. The venue was built in 2010 in preparation for the 2010 FIBA World Championship where, it was the main venue for the tournament, hosting the final phase. The facility was also the main host for EuroBasket 2017. This will be the first major volleyball tournament in this arena.

Distribution of tournament
Istanbul will host preliminary round and knockout stage up to the final.
Brno will host preliminary round and knockout stage up to the quarterfinals.
Baku and Gothenburg will host preliminary round only

(Turkey) Istanbul	2026 Women's European Volleyball Championship (Europe)	Gothenburg
Sinan Erdem Dome	2026 Women's European Volleyball Championship (Europe)	Scandinavium
Capacity: 16,000	2026 Women's European Volleyball Championship (Europe)	Capacity: 10,000
Baku	2026 Women's European Volleyball Championship (Europe)	(Czech Republic) Brno
National Gymnastics Arena	2026 Women's European Volleyball Championship (Europe)	Brno Exhibition Centre
Capacity: 9,000	2026 Women's European Volleyball Championship (Europe)	Capacity: 5,000

Tournament venues information
Venue	Rounds	Games
(Turkey) Sinan Erdem Dome	Pool A, Round of 16, Quarterfinals, Semifinals and Final	25
(Czech Republic) Brno Exhibition Centre	Pool B, Round of 16 and Quarterfinals,	21
(Azerbaijan) National Gymnastics Arena	Pool C	15
(Sweden) Scandinavium	Pool D	15

=== Group allocation of hosts ===
- As the main organisers, Turkey were seeded into Pool A,
- As the secondary venue, the Czech Republic were positioned in Pool B
- As the two countries hosting a single group, Azerbaijan and Sweden are placed into Pool C and D respectively.

== Final draw ==
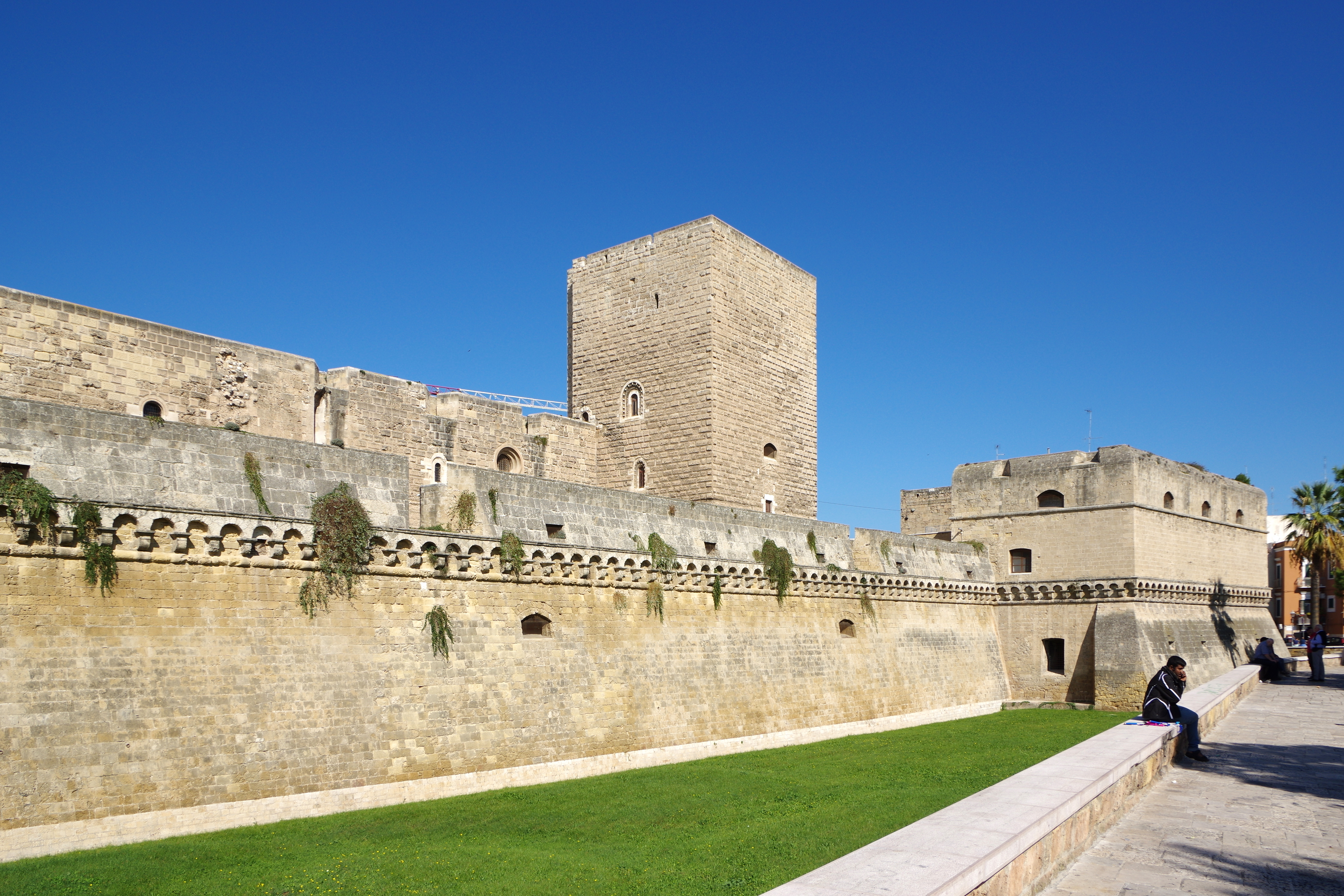
The Castello Normanno-Svevo in Bari hosted the draw.

The final draw took place at 20:45 CET in Bari, Italy on 4 October 2025 at the Castello Normanno-Svevo. Italian journalist, Simona Rolandi and CEV press officer, Federico Ferraro, were the hosts of the final draw. Azerbaijani middle blocker Ayshan Abdulazimova, Czech middle blocker Magdaléna Jehlářová, Swedish outside hitter Anna Haak and Turkish setter Dilay Özdemir were the guests for the final draw. The final draw started with the co-hosts and chosen teams being placed into their respective groups and continued with, in order, pots 1, 2, 3 and 4 being drawn, with each team selected then allocated into the first available group alphabetically.

=== Chosen teams ===
The organizers could select one team to join their pools.

Host team	Chosen team
Azerbaijan	Portugal
Czech Republic	Austria
Sweden	Montenegro
Turkey	Latvia

=== Seeding ===
The teams are seeded according to the CEV National Team rankings before the draw.

The only restriction is that the two finalists from the previous edition, Serbia and Turkey, were drawn in different preliminary pools so that can only play each other in the final phase.

Pot 1	Pot 2	Pot 3	Pot 4
Serbia; Italy; Poland; Netherlands	France; Germany; Ukraine; Belgium	Romania; Bulgaria; Slovenia; Slovakia	Hungary; Greece; Spain; Croatia

- CEV EuroVolley 2026 – Drawing of Lots
- Drawing of Lots Live Streaming

=== Draw results ===
Pool A in Istanbul	Pool B in Brno	Pool C in Baku	Pool D in Gothenburg
Turkey (H)	Czech Republic (H)	Azerbaijan (H)	Sweden (H)
Latvia	Austria	Portugal	Montenegro
Poland	Serbia	Netherlands	Italy
Germany	Ukraine	Belgium	France
Slovenia	Bulgaria	Romania	Slovakia
Hungary	Greece	Spain	Croatia

=== Schedule ===
The schedule was announced on 27 October 2025.

Schedule
Round	Matchday	Date
Preliminary round	All matches	21–28 August 2026
Knockout stage	Round of 16	30 August – 1 September 2026
Knockout stage	Quarterfinals	2–3 September 2026
Knockout stage	Semifinals	5 September 2026
Knockout stage	3rd place & Final	6 September 2026

== Preliminary round ==
- All times are local.
- The top four teams in each pool qualified for the final round.
- Match won 3–0 or 3–1: 3 match points for the winner, 0 match points for the loser
- Match won 3–2: 2 match points for the winner, 1 match point for the loser

=== Tiebreakers ===
1. Number of matches won
2. Match points
3. Sets ratio
4. Points ratio
5. If the tie continues as per the point ratio between two teams, the priority will be given to the team which won the match between them. When the tie in points ratio is between three or more teams, a new classification of these teams in the terms of points 1, 2, 3 and 4 will be made taking into consideration only the matches in which they were opposed to each other.

=== Pool A ===
Pool A was played in Istanbul, Turkey from 21 to 28 August 2026.

Pos	Team	Pld	W	L	Pts	SW	SL	SR	SPW	SPL	SPR	Qualification
1	Poland	5	5	0	14	15	3	5.000	425	373	1.139	Final round
2	Turkey (H)	5	4	1	13	14	5	2.800	451	370	1.219	Final round
3	Slovenia	5	3	2	8	10	8	1.250	394	384	1.026	Final round
4	Germany	5	2	3	6	7	10	0.700	379	376	1.008	Final round
5	Latvia	5	1	4	3	7	14	0.500	414	485	0.854	
6	Hungary	5	0	5	1	2	15	0.133	339	414	0.819	

Source: CEV
(H) Host

Date	Time		Score		Set 1	Set 2	Set 3	Set 4	Set 5	Total	Attd	Report
21 Aug	19:00	Turkey	3–0	Latvia	25–17	25–16	25–16			75–49	9,112	Report
22 Aug	16:00	Germany	0–3	Slovenia	22–25	21–25	20–25			63–75	281	Report
22 Aug	19:00	Hungary	0–3	Poland	12–25	24–26	20–25			56–76	233	Report
23 Aug	16:00	Latvia	1–3	Germany	15–25	18–25	25–13	15–25		73–88	4,102	Report
23 Aug	19:00	Slovenia	1–3	Turkey	21–25	25–22	17–25	16–25		79–97	15,628	Report
24 Aug	16:00	Poland	3–1	Latvia	25–19	23–25	25–22	26–24		99–90	3,364	Report
24 Aug	19:00	Turkey	3–0	Hungary	26–24	25–21	25–14			76–59	13,499	Report
25 Aug	16:00	Hungary	0–3	Germany	17–25	21–25	14–25			52–75	286	Report
25 Aug	19:00	Poland	3–0	Slovenia	25–14	28–26	25–18			78–58	247	Report
26 Aug	16:00	Slovenia	3–2	Latvia	23–25	19–25	25–15	25–13	15–12	107–90	3,282	Report
26 Aug	19:00	Germany	1–3	Turkey	21–25	27–25	20–25	19–25		87–100	15,713	Report
27 Aug	16:00	Poland	3–0	Germany	25–19	25–23	26–24			76–66	371	Report
27 Aug	19:00	Latvia	3–2	Hungary	25–22	18–25	21–25	33–31	15–13	112–116	325	Report
28 Aug	16:00	Slovenia	3–0	Hungary	25–21	25–19	25–16			75–56	1,379	Report
28 Aug	19:00	Turkey	2–3	Poland	25–15	21–25	22–25	25–16	10–15	103–96	15,814	Report

=== Pool B ===
Pool B was played in Brno, Czech Republic from 21 to 27 August 2026.

Pos	Team	Pld	W	L	Pts	SW	SL	SR	SPW	SPL	SPR	Qualification
1	Serbia	5	5	0	15	15	1	15.000	391	294	1.330	Final round
2	Czech Republic (H)	5	4	1	12	13	5	2.600	425	361	1.177	Final round
3	Greece	5	3	2	8	10	10	1.000	418	433	0.965	Final round
4	Bulgaria	5	2	3	5	7	11	0.636	381	401	0.950	Final round
5	Ukraine	5	1	4	4	6	12	0.500	392	389	1.008	
6	Austria	5	0	5	1	3	15	0.200	295	424	0.696	

Source: CEV
(H) Host

Date	Time		Score		Set 1	Set 2	Set 3	Set 4	Set 5	Total	Attd	Report
21 Aug	14:00	Austria	0–3	Serbia	17–25	9–25	21–25			47–75	1,542	Report
21 Aug	17:00	Bulgaria	3–0	Ukraine	25–23	25–23	25–20			75–66	2,159	Report
21 Aug	20:00	Czech Republic	3–1	Greece	25–14	23–25	25–15	25–20		98–74	3,576	Report
22 Aug	16:00	Ukraine	2–3	Greece	23–25	25–23	25–12	22–25	10–15	105–100	2,018	Report
22 Aug	19:00	Austria	0–3	Czech Republic	16–25	17–25	17–25			50–75	3,726	Report
23 Aug	16:00	Greece	3–1	Bulgaria	25–20	21–25	25–18	25–23		96–86	3,459	Report
23 Aug	19:00	Czech Republic	1–3	Serbia	19–25	17–25	25–16	17–25		78–91	5,201	Report
24 Aug	16:00	Ukraine	3–0	Austria	25–15	25–16	25–12			75–43	352	Report
24 Aug	19:00	Serbia	3–0	Bulgaria	25–18	25–14	25–20			75–52	457	Report
25 Aug	16:00	Greece	3–1	Austria	20–25	25–18	25–12	25–14		95–69	1485	Report
25 Aug	19:00	Czech Republic	3–1	Ukraine	25–17	21–25	25–19	25–21		96–82	3,121	Report
26 Aug	16:00	Austria	2–3	Bulgaria	26–24	25–15	15–25	16–25	4–15	86–104	312	Report
26 Aug	19:00	Serbia	3–0	Greece	25–22	25–13	25–18			75–53	415	Report
27 Aug	16:00	Ukraine	0–3	Serbia	21–25	22–25	21–25			64–75	2,622	Report
27 Aug	19:00	Czech Republic	3–0	Bulgaria	28–26	25–19	25–19			78–64	4,725	Report

=== Pool C ===
Pool C was played in Baku, Azerbaijan from 21 to 28 August 2026.

Pos	Team	Pld	W	L	Pts	SW	SL	SR	SPW	SPL	SPR	Qualification
1	Belgium	5	5	0	13	15	4	3.750	438	371	1.181	Final round
2	Netherlands	5	4	1	12	14	6	2.333	463	389	1.190	Final round
3	Azerbaijan (H)	5	3	2	8	10	9	1.111	423	412	1.027	Final round
4	Portugal	5	2	3	5	7	12	0.583	405	450	0.900	Final round
5	Romania	5	1	4	6	9	12	0.750	445	454	0.980	
6	Spain	5	0	5	1	3	15	0.200	332	430	0.772	

Source: CEV
(H) Host

Date	Time		Score		Set 1	Set 2	Set 3	Set 4	Set 5	Total	Attd	Report
21 Aug	19:00	Azerbaijan	3–1	Portugal	25–22	23–25	27–25	25–20		100–92	5,550	Report
22 Aug	15:30	Belgium	3–2	Spain	25–15	18–25	23–25	25–17	15–8	106–90	200	Report
22 Aug	18:30	Romania	2–3	Netherlands	21–25	28–26	15–25	25–22	9–15	98–113	250	Report
23 Aug	15:30	Portugal	0–3	Belgium	16–25	22–25	11–25			49–75	300	Report
23 Aug	18:30	Spain	0–3	Azerbaijan	16–25	22–25	15–25			53–75	4,250	Report
24 Aug	15:30	Netherlands	3–0	Portugal	25–21	25–18	25–23			75–62	300	Report
24 Aug	18:30	Azerbaijan	3–2	Romania	25–21	25–23	15–25	22–25	15–8	102–102	4,100	Report
25 Aug	15:30	Romania	0–3	Belgium	21–25	20–25	17–25			58–75	200	Report
25 Aug	18:30	Netherlands	3–0	Spain	25–13	25–11	25–16			75–40	100	Report
26 Aug	15:30	Spain	1–3	Portugal	26–24	23–25	19–25	20–25		88–99	300	Report
26 Aug	18:30	Belgium	3–0	Azerbaijan	25–19	25–22	25–23			75–64	4,650	Report
27 Aug	15:30	Netherlands	2–3	Belgium	25–27	22–25	25–22	25–18	13–15	110–107	200	Report
27 Aug	18:30	Portugal	3–2	Romania	15–25	26–24	20–25	27–25	15–13	103–112	160	Report
28 Aug	15:30	Spain	0–3	Romania	19–25	22–25	20–25			61–75	300	Report
28 Aug	18:30	Azerbaijan	1–3	Netherlands	25–15	16–25	22–25	19–25		82–90	5,120	Report

=== Pool D ===
Pool D was played in Gothenburg, Sweden from 21 to 27 August 2026.

Pos	Team	Pld	W	L	Pts	SW	SL	SR	SPW	SPL	SPR	Qualification
1	Italy	5	5	0	15	15	1	15.000	394	304	1.296	Final round
2	France	5	4	1	12	13	4	3.250	405	351	1.154	Final round
3	Sweden (H)	5	3	2	7	10	10	1.000	439	423	1.038	Final round
4	Croatia	5	2	3	5	8	13	0.615	432	459	0.941	Final round
5	Slovakia	5	1	4	5	7	12	0.583	379	411	0.922	
6	Montenegro	5	0	5	1	2	15	0.133	307	408	0.752	

Source: CEV
(H) Host

Date	Time		Score		Set 1	Set 2	Set 3	Set 4	Set 5	Total	Attd	Report
21 Aug	13:00	France	3–0	Slovakia	25–13	25–21	25–13			75–47	525	Report
21 Aug	16:00	Croatia	0–3	Italy	9–25	22–25	23–25			54–75		Report
21 Aug	19:00	Sweden	3–0	Montenegro	25–13	25–18	25–23			75–54	5,261	Report
22 Aug	15:00	Italy	3–0	Montenegro	25–13	25–20	25–19			75–52	2,986	Report
22 Aug	18:00	Slovakia	2–3	Sweden	22–25	16–25	25–14	25–22	6–15	94–101	6,220	Report
23 Aug	15:00	France	3–0	Croatia	25–16	25–17	25–22			75–55	3,261	Report
23 Aug	18:00	Sweden	0–3	Italy	18–25	23–25	14–25			55–75	6,801	Report
24 Aug	16:00	Croatia	3–2	Slovakia	25–27	19–25	25–21	25–22	15–11	109–106	299	Report
24 Aug	19:00	Montenegro	0–3	France	19–25	22–25	17–25			58–75	360	Report
25 Aug	16:00	Italy	3–0	Slovakia	25–19	25–18	25–20			75–57	1,261	Report
25 Aug	19:00	Sweden	3–2	Croatia	16–25	22–25	25–19	25–16	23–21	111–106	3,871	Report
26 Aug	16:00	France	1–3	Italy	19–25	25–19	23–25	19–25		86–94	863	Report
26 Aug	19:00	Slovakia	3–0	Montenegro	25–21	25–19	25–11			75–51	907	Report
27 Aug	16:00	Croatia	3–2	Montenegro	21–25	25–20	22–25	25–14	15–8	108–92	858	Report
27 Aug	19:00	Sweden	1–3	France	26–28	25–13	20–25	26–28		97–94	5,083	Report

== Final round ==
- All times are local.

Round of 16
31 August – Istanbul
Poland	3
Portugal	0
31 August – Istanbul
Netherlands	3
Slovenia	2
31 August – Brno
Italy	3
Bulgaria	0
31 August – Brno
Czech Republic	0
Sweden	3
1 September – Istanbul
Belgium	2
Germany	3
1 September – Istanbul
Turkey	3
Azerbaijan	0
30 August – Brno
Serbia	3
Croatia	1
30 August – Brno
France	0
Greece	3

Quarterfinals
3 September – Istanbul
Poland	3
Netherlands	1
2 September – Brno
Italy	3
Sweden	1
3 September – Istanbul
Germany	1
Turkey	3
2 September – Brno
Serbia	3
Greece	0

Semifinals
5 September – Istanbul
Poland	1
Italy	3
5 September – Istanbul
Turkey	3
Serbia	0

Final
6 September – Istanbul
Italy	2
Turkey	3
3rd place match
6 September – Istanbul
Poland	1
Serbia	3

=== Round of 16 ===
Date	Time		Score		Set 1	Set 2	Set 3	Set 4	Set 5	Total	Attd	Report
30 Aug	16:00	France	0–3	Greece	16–25	18–25	20–25			54–75	825	Report
30 Aug	19:00	Serbia	3–1	Croatia	19–25	25–19	25–17	25–12		94–73	1,167	Report
31 Aug	16:00	Italy	3–0	Bulgaria	25–18	25–13	25–13			75–44	2,185	Report
31 Aug	19:00	Czech Republic	0–3	Sweden	19–25	23–25	21–25			63–75	5,021	Report
31 Aug	16:00	Netherlands	3–2	Slovenia	25–18	19–25	25–21	29–31	15–9	113–104	258	Report
31 Aug	19:00	Poland	3–0	Portugal	25–18	25–17	25–23			75–58	607	Report
1 Sep	16:00	Belgium	2–3	Germany	25–20	21–25	20–25	27–25	8–15	101–110	674	Report
1 Sep	19:00	Turkey	3–0	Azerbaijan	25–14	25–16	25–22			75–52	8,104	Report

=== Quarterfinals ===
Date	Time		Score		Set 1	Set 2	Set 3	Set 4	Set 5	Total	Attd	Report
2 Sep	16:00	Serbia	3–0	Greece	25–14	25–20	25–17			75–51	1,234	Report
2 Sep	19:00	Italy	3–1	Sweden	21–25	26–24	25–21	25–23		97–93	1,745	Report
3 Sep	16:00	Poland	3–1	Netherlands	25–16	20–25	25–20	25–23		95–84	2,414	Report
3 Sep	19:00	Germany	1–3	Turkey	18–25	25–22	18–25	22–25		83–97	12,314	Report

=== Semifinals ===
Date	Time		Score		Set 1	Set 2	Set 3	Set 4	Set 5	Total	Attd	Report
5 Sep	16:00	Turkey	3–0	Serbia	25–20	25–19	25–20			75–59	15,824	Report
5 Sep	19:00	Poland	1–3	Italy	19–25	19–25	25–21	16–25		79–96	6,824	Report

=== 3rd place match ===
Date	Time		Score		Set 1	Set 2	Set 3	Set 4	Set 5	Total	Attd	Report
6 Sep	16:00	Poland	1–3	Serbia	21–25	19–25	25–15	18–25		83–90	3,739	Report

=== Final ===
Date	Time		Score		Set 1	Set 2	Set 3	Set 4	Set 5	Total	Attd	Report
6 Sep	19:00	Italy	2–3	Turkey	25–16	22–25	25–12	21–25	10–15	103–93	17,299	Report

== Final standings ==
Pos	Team	Pld	W	L	Pts	SW	SL	SR	SPW	SPL	SPR	Qualification
1st place, gold medalist(s)	Turkey (H)	9	8	1	24	26	8	3.250	791	667	1.186	Qualified for the 2027 World Cup, the 2028 Summer Olympics, and the 2028 European Championship as defending champions
2nd place, silver medalist(s)	Italy	9	8	1	25	26	6	4.333	765	613	1.248	Qualified for the 2027 World Cup as defending champions
3rd place, bronze medalist(s)	Serbia	9	8	1	24	24	6	4.000	709	576	1.231	Qualified for the 2027 World Cup
4	Poland	9	7	2	20	23	10	2.300	757	701	1.080	Qualified for the 2027 World Cup
5	Netherlands	7	5	2	14	18	11	1.636	660	588	1.122	
6	Greece	7	4	3	11	13	13	1.000	544	562	0.968	
7	Sweden (H)	7	4	3	10	14	13	1.077	607	583	1.041	
8	Germany	7	3	4	8	11	15	0.733	572	574	0.997	
9	Belgium	6	5	1	14	17	7	2.429	539	481	1.121	
10	France	6	4	2	12	13	7	1.857	459	426	1.077	
11	Czech Republic (H)	6	4	2	12	13	8	1.625	488	436	1.119	
12	Slovenia	6	3	3	9	12	11	1.091	498	497	1.002	
13	Azerbaijan (H)	6	3	3	8	10	12	0.833	475	487	0.975	
14	Croatia	6	2	4	5	9	16	0.563	505	553	0.913	
15	Bulgaria	6	2	4	5	7	14	0.500	425	476	0.893	
16	Portugal	6	2	4	5	7	15	0.467	463	525	0.882	
17	Romania	5	1	4	6	9	12	0.750	445	454	0.980	
18	Slovakia	5	1	4	5	7	12	0.583	379	411	0.922	Qualified for the 2028 European Championship as hosts
19	Ukraine	5	1	4	4	6	12	0.500	392	389	1.008	
20	Latvia	5	1	4	3	7	14	0.500	414	485	0.854	
21	Spain	5	0	5	1	3	15	0.200	332	430	0.772	Qualified for the 2028 European Championship as hosts
22	Austria	5	0	5	1	3	15	0.200	295	424	0.696	
23	Hungary	5	0	5	1	2	15	0.133	339	414	0.819	
24	Montenegro	5	0	5	1	2	15	0.133	307	408	0.752	

Source: CEV
(H) Host

== Awards ==
2026 Women's European Volleyball champions

Turkey
Second title

The following awards were given at the conclusion of the tournament:

- Most valuable player
  (Turkey) Melissa Vargas
- Best setter
  (Italy) Alessia Orro
- Best outside hitters
  (Italy) Myriam Sylla
  (Turkey) Derya Cebecioğlu
- Best middle blockers
  (Serbia) Hena Kurtagić
  (Turkey) Zehra Güneş
- Best opposite spiker
  (Turkey) Melissa Vargas
- Best libero
  (Turkey) Gizem Örge

== Statistics ==
=== Top 5 Scorers ===
Rank	Name	Points (Note: The listed scores only include matches from the final phase, not the qualification phase played in 2024–2025.)
1	(Sweden) Isabelle Haak	247
2	(Turkey) Melissa Vargas	195
3	(Italy) Paola Egonu	167
4	(Poland) Magdalena Stysiak	152
5	(Serbia) Tijana Bošković	147

=== Notable statistics ===
- Most points in a set: 33–31 (Fourth set in Latvia 3–2 Hungary, 27 August)
- Fewest points by a team in a set: 4–15 (Fifth set in Austria 2–3 Bulgaria, 26 August)
- Longest game: 2 hr 39 min (Latvia 3–2 Hungary, 27 August)
- Shortest game: 1 hr 5 min (Netherlands 3–0 Spain, 25 August)
- Most points scored by a player in a game: 52 (Isabelle Haak vs Croatia, 25 August)
- Highest attended game: 17,299 (Italy 2–3 Turkey, 6 September)
- Lowest attended game: 100 (Netherlands 3–0 Spain, 25 August)

=== Notable occurrences ===
- Sweden's opening match against Montenegro broke the Swedish record for the highest attended women's volleyball game ever in the country. The following day, the record was broken again with against 6,220 spectators watching the Swedes play Slovakia. The record was broken once again, with Sweden's third game against Italy having an attendance of 6,801.
- On 26 August, Portugal won their first ever match at EuroVolley. They defeated Spain 3–1 in Baku.
- On 27 August, Portugal reached the knockout phase of a EuroVolley for the first time.
- On 27 August, Latvia won their first game at EuroVolley for the first time since 1997 with a 3–2 win over Hungary in Istanbul.
- Greece reached the quarterfinals for the first time after a 3–0 win over France.
- After its performance, Romania missed qualification for the World Cup (formerly World Championship) as the first team below the qualifying line — for the second consecutive time.

=== Tournament venues attendance ===
Venue	Total	Avg.	Games
(Azerbaijan) National Gymnastics Arena	25,980	1,732	15
(Czech Republic) Brno Exhibition Centre	47,347	2,255	21
(Sweden) Scandinavium	39,953	2,664	15
(Turkey) Sinan Erdem Dome	151,693	6,068	25

== See also ==
- 2026 AVC Women's Volleyball Continental Championship
- 2026 Women's African Nations Volleyball Championship
- 2026 Women's NORCECA Volleyball Championship
- 2026 Women's South American Volleyball Championship
- 2026 Women's European Volleyball League
- 2026 Women's U22 European Volleyball Championship
- 2026 Women's U18 European Volleyball Championship
