= Anita Sobočan =

Slovenian volleyball player (born 1997)

Personal information
- Nationality: Slovenian
- Born: 26 May 1997 (age 29); Celje, Slovenia
- Height: 177 cm (70 in)
- Spike: 273 cm (107 in)
- Block: 287 cm (113 in)

Volleyball information
- Position: Wing spiker

Career
Years	Teams
2013–2014; 2014–2021	ŽOK Braslovče; OK Nova KBM Branik

National team
Slovenia

Anita Sobočan (born 26 May 1997) is a retired Slovenian female volleyball player who played as a wing spiker. She was part of the Slovenia women's national volleyball team.

Sobočan competed at the 2015 Women's European Volleyball Championship.
