= Anja Zdovc =

Slovene volleyball player (born 1987)

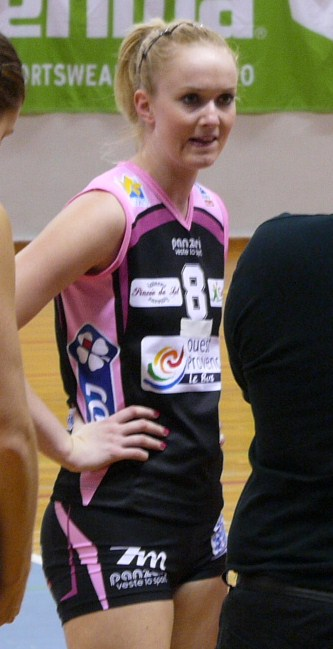

Personal information
- Nationality: Slovenian
- Born: 24 August 1987 (age 39); Slovenj Gradec, SR Slovenia, SFR Yugoslavia
- Height: 183 cm (6 ft 0 in)
- Weight: 70 kg (154 lb)
- Spike: 290 cm (114 in)
- Block: 274 cm (108 in)

Volleyball information
- Position: Outside-spiker
- Number: 8 (national team)

Career
Years	Teams
2015	Vennelles VB

National team
2015	Slovenia

Anja Zdovc (born 24 August 1987) is a Slovenian female volleyball player, playing as an outside-spiker. She is part of the Slovenia women's national volleyball team.

She competed at the 2015 Women's European Volleyball Championship. On club level she plays for Vennelles VB.
