= Finland women's national volleyball team =

Women's national volleyball team representing Finland

Finland
- Association: Finland Volleyball Federation
- Confederation: CEV
- Head coach: (Switzerland) Nikolas Buser
- FIVB ranking: 36 ▼2 (24 May 2026)

Uniforms
Home	Away	Third

World Championship
- Appearances: 1 (First in 1978)
- Best result: 21st place (1978)

European Championship
- Appearances: 5 (First in 1977)
- Best result: 12th (1977, 1989)

The Finland women's national volleyball team represents Finland in international women's volleyball competitions and friendly matches.

== Results ==
World Championship record
Year	Round	Position	Pld	W	L	SW	SL	Squad
(Soviet Union) 1952	did not qualify							
(France) 1956	did not qualify							
(Brazil) 1960	did not qualify							
(Soviet Union) 1962	did not qualify							
(Japan) 1967	did not qualify							
(Bulgaria) 1970	did not qualify							
(Mexico) 1974	did not qualify							
(Soviet Union) 1978	Round 1	21st	8	2	6	10	19	Squad
(Peru) 1982	did not qualify							
(Czechoslovakia) 1986	did not qualify							
(China) 1990	did not qualify							
(Brazil) 1994	did not qualify							
(Japan) 1998	did not qualify							
(Germany) 2002	did not qualify							
(Japan) 2006	did not qualify							
(Japan) 2010	did not qualify							
(Italy) 2014	did not qualify							
(Japan) 2018	did not qualify							
(Netherlands) / (Poland) 2022	did not qualify							
(Thailand) 2025	did not qualify							
(Canada) / (United States) 2027	To be determined							
(Philippines) 2029	To be determined							
Total	Qualified: 1/22		8	2	6	10	19	—

=== European Championship ===
European Championship record
Year	Round	Position	Pld	W	L	SW	SL	Squad
(Czechoslovakia) 1949	did not qualify							
(Bulgaria) 1950	did not qualify							
(France) 1951	did not qualify							
(Romania) 1955	did not qualify							
(Czechoslovakia) 1958	did not qualify							
(Romania) 1963	did not qualify							
(Turkey) 1967	did not qualify							
(Italy) 1971	did not qualify							
(Socialist Federal Republic of Yugoslavia) 1975	did not qualify							
(Finland) 1977	Preliminary round	12th	7	1	6	6	20	Squad
(France) 1979	did not qualify							
(Bulgaria) 1981	did not qualify							
(East Germany) 1983	did not qualify							
(Netherlands) 1985	did not qualify							
(Belgium) 1987	did not qualify							
(West Germany) 1989	Preliminary round	12th	7	0	7	2	21	Squad
(Italy) 1991	did not qualify							
(Czech Republic) 1993	did not qualify							
(Netherlands) 1995	did not qualify							
(Czech Republic) 1997	did not qualify							
(Italy) 1999	did not qualify							
(Bulgaria) 2001	did not qualify							
(Turkey) 2003	did not qualify							
(Croatia) 2005	did not qualify							
(Belgium) / (Luxembourg) 2007	did not qualify							
(Poland) 2009	did not qualify							
(Italy) / (Serbia) 2011	did not qualify							
(Germany) / (Switzerland) 2013	did not qualify							
(Netherlands) / (Belgium) 2015	did not qualify							
(Azerbaijan) / (Georgia (country)) 2017	did not qualify							
(Slovakia) / (Hungary) / (Poland) / (Turkey) 2019	Preliminary round	18th	5	1	4	6	13	Squad
(Serbia) / (Bulgaria) / (Croatia) / (Romania) 2021	Preliminary round	18th	5	1	4	6	13	Squad
(Belgium) / (Italy) / (Estonia) / (Germany) 2023	Preliminary round	21st	5	1	4	4	14	Squad
(Azerbaijan) / (Czech Republic) / (Sweden) / (Turkey) 2026	did not qualify							
(Spain) 2028	To be determined							
Total	Qualified: 5/35		29	4	25	24	81	—

=== Summer Universiade ===
Summer Universiade
Year	Position
(South Korea) 2015	10th
(Chinese Taipei) 2017	5th

=== European Volleyball League ===
- 2017 — 2nd place
- 2018 — 4th place
- 2019 — 7th place
- 2020 — Cancelled
- 2024 — 14th place/2nd place (Silver League)
- 2026 — 8th place

== See also ==
- Finland women's national under-21 volleyball team
- Finland women's national under-19 volleyball team
- CEV Women's U22 Volleyball European Championship
- CEV Women's U17 Volleyball European Championship
