= Saša Planinšec =

Slovene volleyball player (born 1995)

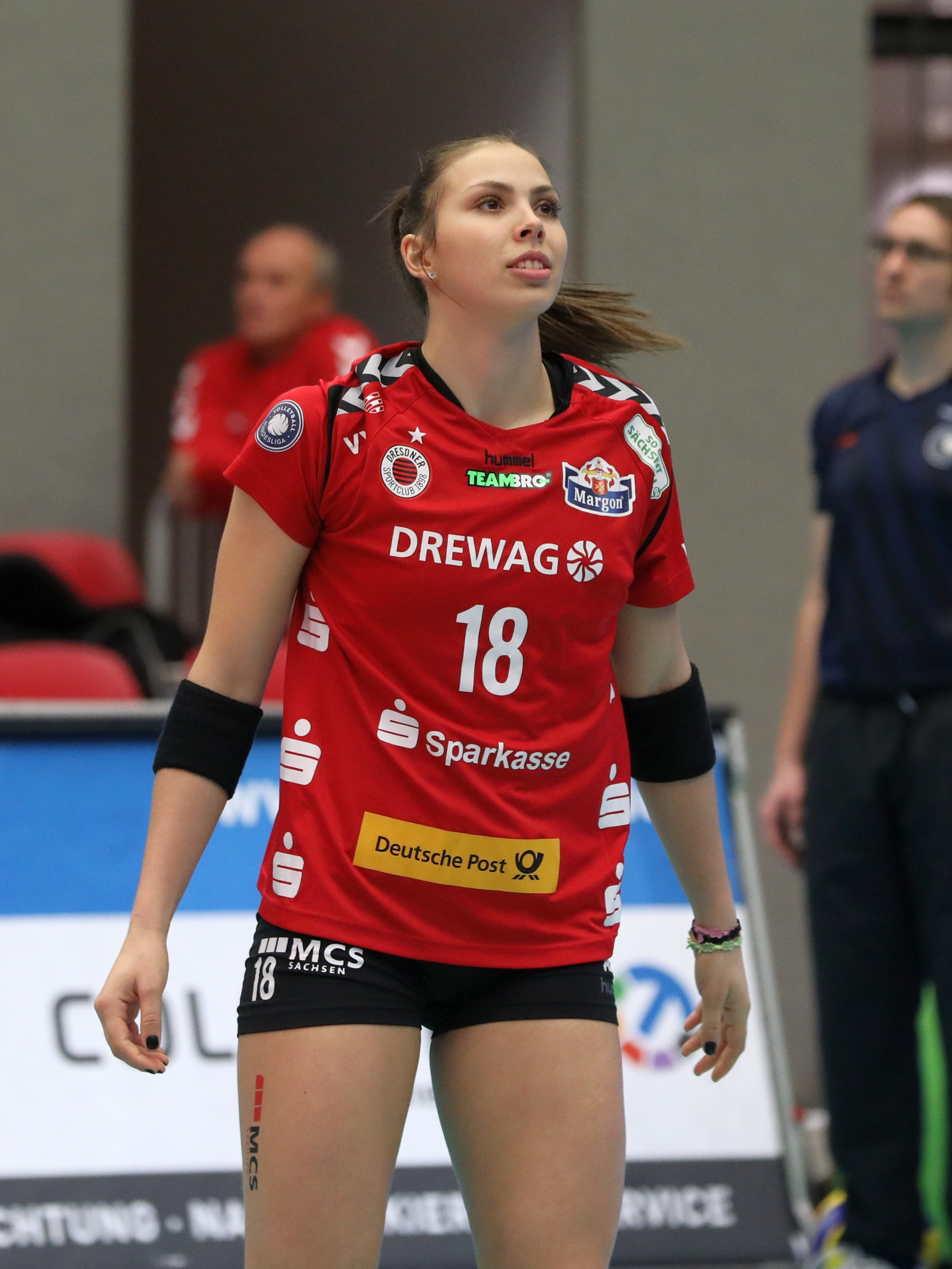

Personal information
- Born: 2 June 1995 (age 31); Maribor, Slovenia
- Height: 1.85 m (6 ft 1 in)
- Weight: 74 kg (163 lb)
- Spike: 320 cm (130 in)
- Block: 290 cm (110 in)

Volleyball information
- Position: Middle blocker
- Current club: Aydın Büyükşehir Belediyespor

Career
Years
- 2012–2017
- 2017–2019
- 2019
- 2020
- 2021–2022
- 2022–
Teams
- Nova KBM Branik
- Dresdner SC
- Zhejiang
- Aydın Büyükşehir Belediyespor
- Galatasaray
- Aydın Büyükşehir Belediyespor

National team
Slovenia

Saša Planinšec (born 2 June 1995) is a Slovenian female volleyball player who plays as a middle blocker for Aydın Büyükşehir Belediyespor.

== Career ==
On 21 April 2021, Planinšec signed a one-year contract with Galatasaray.
