= Ioana Baciu =

Romanian volleyball player (born 1990)

Personal information
- Full name: Ioana Maria Baciu
- Nationality: Romanian
- Born: 4 January 1990 (age 36)

Volleyball information
- Current club: ALIANZA LIMA
- Number: 1

Career
Years	Teams
2018-	CSM Volei Alba Blaj

National team
Romania
- Last updated: 28.09.2026

Ioana Maria Baciu (born 4 January 1990) is a Romanian female volleyball player. She is part of the Romania women's national volleyball team.

She competed at the 2015 Women's European Volleyball Championship. On club level she plays for CSM Volei Alba Blaj since the summer of 2018. Previously she played for CSM Bucuresti and Dinamo Bucuresti.
