= 2028 Women's European Volleyball Championship =

Tournament details
- Host countries: Slovakia; Spain (N/A) (N/A)
- Dates: 2028
- Teams: 24
- Venue: TBD (in TBD host cities)

The 2028 Women's European Volleyball Championship, commonly referred to as EuroVolley Women 2028, will be the 35th edition of the biannual continental tournament for women's national volleyball teams, organised by Europe's governing volleyball body, CEV. The tournament will be held in 2028. It will be organised in Slovakia, Spain and two yet to be known countries, marking the fifth consecutive time EuroVolley will be held in four countries, after the multi-country hosting system was first used in 2019.

24 teams will participate for the fifth time as well. Qualification took place in May 2026 to July 2027. The four co-hosts qualified automatically.

This will be the second European Championship after 2026 to be held in an even-numbered year.

The top three finishers will also qualify for the 2029 FIVB Women's Volleyball World Cup in the Philippines.

Turkey are the two-time defending champions, having won the last two editions in 2023 and 2026.

== Bidding process ==
On 4 July 2025, the bidding process was started.

=== Hosting requirements ===
==== Venue requirements ====
Rounds	Capacity
Group stage, Eight-finals & Quarterfinals	5,000
Semifinals & Final	10,000

==== Organisation fees ====
Rounds	Price
Group stage	€650,000
Group stage, Eight-finals & Quarterfinals	€1,2 million
Group stage, Eight-finals, Quarterfinals, Semifinals & Final	€2 million

=== Host selection ===
- Slovakia – On 13 June 2026, after hosting the 2026 Women's European League in Poprad, president of the Slovak Volleyball Federation, Marek Rojko, stated that they have decided to bid for the competition. On 31 August 2026, Slovakia was confirmed to be the second host, with the new Olympic Arena in Šamorín being the venue that will host a group. This will be Slovakia's second time hosting after 2019.
- Spain – On 6 November 2024, CEV president, Roko Sikirić, said he would like to see Spain host EuroVolley in 2028. Later in the month, new president of the Real Federación Española de Voleibol, Felipe Pascual Bernáldez, said he also intended to bid for EuroVolley, touting Madrid and the Canary Islands as possible host venues. In April 2026, Sikirić encouraged Spain to organise major events. On 16 July 2026, Spain became the first hosts of the tournament, with games to take place at the Centro Insular de Deportes in Las Palmas. This is Spain's first time ever organizing the event.

=== Interested applicants ===
- France – In October 2025, president of the Real Federación Española de Voleibol, Felipe Pascual Bernáldez, said he encourages Spain neighbours, France and Portugal, to co-host the event with them and is optimistic they will join. This would be France's third time hosting after 1951 and 1979.
- Portugal – In October 2025, president of the Real Federación Española de Voleibol, Felipe Pascual Bernáldez, said he encourages Spain neighbours, France and Portugal, to co-host the event with them and is optimistic they will join. Portugal have never hosted the event before.

== Qualification ==
24 teams qualify for the championship. For the first time since the 1971 edition, there will be no qualification tournament and teams will earn slots in the tournament through different methods. The four co-hosts and the defending champions from the 2026 edition automatically progress (in the event that a host nation has already qualified via another pathway, its host slot cascades to the European Ranking for national teams as of 2027, and in case the defending champions has already qualified via another pathway, its slot goes to the next best team not yet qualified from the 2026 edition).

For the first time, Women's European Volleyball League will serve as a qualifier for the tournament. The semifinalists from the 2026 and 2027 editions will qualify for the tournament (in case a qualified team occupies a slot, it goes to the next best team not yet qualified from the European League OR it goes to European Ranking).

The remaining 11 slots will be allocated to the highest-ranked teams not yet qualified according to the European Ranking for national teams at the end of the 2027 European League and 2027 FIVB Nations League.

Means of qualification	Qualifier	Means of qualification	Qualifier
Host Countries	Spain	European Ranking	(N/A)
Host Countries	Slovakia	European Ranking	(N/A)
Host Countries	(N/A)	European Ranking	(N/A)
Host Countries	(N/A)	European Ranking	(N/A)
2026 European League	Sweden	European Ranking	(N/A)
2026 European League	Slovenia	European Ranking	(N/A)
2026 European League	Hungary	European Ranking	(N/A)
2027 European League	(N/A)	European Ranking	(N/A)
2027 European League	(N/A)	European Ranking	(N/A)
2027 European League	(N/A)	European Ranking	(N/A)
2027 European League	(N/A)	European Ranking	(N/A)
Defending champions	Turkey	European Ranking	(N/A)
Total 24

=== Summary of qualified teams ===
Team	Qualification method	Date of qualification	Appearance(s)				Previous best performance (Note: Bold text indicates they hosted that edition.)	WR (Note: At the start of the tournament.)
Team	Qualification method	Date of qualification	Total	First	Last	Streak	Previous best performance	WR
Spain	Host nation	16 July 2026	10th	2005	2026	5	9th place (2009)	TBD
Slovakia (Note: Originally qualified on 21 June 2026 as the European League Semi-finalist. Their spot was allocated to European Ranking, after being awarded hosting rights on 31 August 2026.)	Host nation	31 August 2026	8th	2003	2026	5	10th place (2023)	TBD
(N/A)	Host nation							TBD
(N/A)	Host nation							TBD
Sweden	2026 European League semifinalists	20 June 2026	7th	1967	2026	3	7th place (**2026**)	TBD
Hungary	2026 European League semifinalists	20 June 2026	21st	1949	2026	7	Runners-up (1975)	TBD
Slovenia	2026 European League semifinalists	20 June 2026	5th	2015	2026	3	12th place (2026)	TBD
Turkey	Defending champions	6 September 2026	18th	1963	2026	13	**Champions** (2023, **2026**)	TBD
(N/A)	2027 European League semifinalists							TBD
(N/A)	2027 European League semifinalists							TBD
(N/A)	2027 European League semifinalists							TBD
(N/A)	2027 European League semifinalists							TBD
(N/A)	European highest-ranked non-qualified team							TBD
(N/A)	European highest-ranked non-qualified team							TBD
(N/A)	European highest-ranked non-qualified team							TBD
(N/A)	European highest-ranked non-qualified team							TBD
(N/A)	European highest-ranked non-qualified team							TBD
(N/A)	European highest-ranked non-qualified team							TBD
(N/A)	European highest-ranked non-qualified team							TBD
(N/A)	European highest-ranked non-qualified team							TBD
(N/A)	European highest-ranked non-qualified team							TBD
(N/A)	European highest-ranked non-qualified team							TBD
(N/A)	European highest-ranked non-qualified team							TBD
(N/A)	European highest-ranked non-qualified team							TBD

== Venues ==
So far two venues in two cities has been revealed to host the tournament.

=== Overview of venues ===
==== Slovakia ====
- One Slovak venue will be used during the tournament. The new Olympic arena in Šamorín will host the group phase.

==== Spain ====
- One Spanish venue will be used during the tournament. The Centro Insular de Deportes in Las Palmas will host the group phase.

== Final standing ==
Rank	Team
1st place, gold medalist(s)	
2nd place, silver medalist(s)	
3rd place, bronze medalist(s)	
4	
5	
6	
7	
8	
9	
10	
11	
12	
13	
14	
15	
16	
17	
18	
19	
20	
21	
22	
23	
24	

Qualified for the 2029 World Cup
Qualified for the 2029 World Cup via FIVB World Ranking
