= Slovenia women's national volleyball team =

Women's national volleyball team representing Slovenia

Slovenia
- Association: Volleyball Federation of Slovenia
- Confederation: CEV
- Head coach: Alessandro Orefice
- FIVB ranking: 18 ▲2 (2 October 2026)

Uniforms
Home	Away

World Championship
- Appearances: 1 (First in 2025)
- Best result: 16th place (2025)

European Championship
- Appearances: 4 (First in 2015)
- Best result: 12th place (2026)
- Website

The Slovenia women's national volleyball team represents Slovenia in international women's volleyball competitions and friendly matches.

== Results ==
=== World Championship ===
- 2025 – 16th place

=== Nations League ===
- 2027 – Qualified

=== European Championship ===
- 2015 – 16th place
- 2019 – 16th place
- 2023 – 20th place
- 2026 – 12th place
- 2028 – Qualified

=== European League ===
- 2014 – 7th place
- 2016 – (bronze) Bronze Medal
- 2019 – 14th place
- 2020 – cancelled
- 2021 – 14th place
- 2022 – 12th place
- 2024 – 10th place
- 2025 – 5th place
- 2026 – (silver) Silver Medal

== Team ==
=== Current squad ===
The following is the Slovenia roster for the 2015 Women's European Volleyball Championship.

Head coach: Bruno Najdič

No.	Name	Date of birth	Height	Weight	Spike	Block	2015 club
1	Eva Mori	13 March 1996	1.88 m (6 ft 2 in)	70 kg (150 lb)	285 cm (112 in)	270 cm (110 in)	(Italy) Volley Bergamo
2	Sara Hutinski	20 June 1991	1.88 m (6 ft 2 in)	75 kg (165 lb)	300 cm (120 in)	282 cm (111 in)	(France) RC Cannes
4	Nika Blagne	16 November 1992	1.83 m (6 ft 0 in)				(Slovenia) OK Nova KBM Branik
6	Katja Medved	20 March 1986	1.62 m (5 ft 4 in)	55 kg (121 lb)	264 cm (104 in)	251 cm (99 in)	(Romania) CS Volei Alba-Blaj
8	Anja Zdovc	24 August 1987	1.83 m (6 ft 0 in)	70 kg (150 lb)	290 cm (110 in)	274 cm (108 in)	(France) Venelles VB
9	Iza Mlakar	14 November 1995	1.83 m (6 ft 0 in)	69 kg (152 lb)	305 cm (120 in)	293 cm (115 in)	(Slovenia) OK Nova KBM Branik
13	Živa Recek	10 May 1993	1.82 m (6 ft 0 in)	69 kg (152 lb)	288 cm (113 in)	268 cm (106 in)	(United States) University of Florida
15	Sara Najdič	17 December 1992	1.70 m (5 ft 7 in)	57 kg (126 lb)	270 cm (110 in)	252 cm (99 in)	(Slovenia) OK Nova KBM Branik
16	Lana Ščuka	6 October 1986	1.86 m (6 ft 1 in)	71 kg (157 lb)	286 cm (113 in)	268 cm (106 in)	(Slovenia) Calcit Ljubljana
17	Marina Cvetanović (C)	26 July 1986	1.84 m (6 ft 0 in)	70 kg (150 lb)	305 cm (120 in)	298 cm (117 in)	(Italy) Libertas Aversa
18	Monika Potokar	18 February 1987	1.77 m (5 ft 10 in)	66 kg (146 lb)	280 cm (110 in)	262 cm (103 in)	(Italy) Volley 2002 Forlì
20	Saša Planinšec	2 June 1995	1.80 m (5 ft 11 in)	65 kg (143 lb)	288 cm (113 in)	269 cm (106 in)	(Slovenia) OK Nova KBM Branik
21	Valentina Založnik	5 April 1992	1.90 m (6 ft 3 in)	63 kg (139 lb)	300 cm (120 in)	281 cm (111 in)	(United States) University of San Francisco
22	Anita Sobočan	26 May 1992	1.75 m (5 ft 9 in)	60 kg (130 lb)	287 cm (113 in)	260 cm (100 in)	(Slovenia) OK Nova KBM Branik
