= Latvia women's national volleyball team =

Women's national volleyball team representing Latvia

Latvia
- Association: Latvijas Volejbola Federācija
- Confederation: CEV
- FIVB ranking: 58 ▼1 (24 May 2026)

Uniforms
Home	Away

The Latvia women's national volleyball team represents Latvia in international women's volleyball competitions and friendly matches. After the dissolution of the Soviet Union the team first competed on the highest level under its own flag at the 1993 European Championship, finishing in ninth place.

Paula Ņečiporuka was named as the captain of the team in 2022.

== Results ==
=== World Championship ===
- 1998 — did not qualify
- 2002 to 2025 — did not qualify

=== European Championship ===
- 1993 — 9th place
- 1995 — 9th place
- 1997 — 8th place
- 1999 — did not compete
- 2001 — did not compete
- 2003 — did not compete
- 2005 — did not compete
- 2007 — did not compete
- 2009 — did not compete
- 2011 — did not compete
- 2013 — did not qualify
- 2015 — did not qualify
- 2017 — did not qualify
- 2019 — did not qualify
- 2021 — did not qualify
- 2023 — did not qualify
- 2026 — 20th place
