= 2025 AVC Women's Volleyball Champions League =

Volleyball competition

- Official logo

Tournament details
- Host country: Philippines
- City: Pasig
- Dates: 20–27 April 2025
- Teams: 12 (from 1 confederation)
- Venue: 1 (in 1 host city)

Final positions
- Champions: (Kazakhstan) Zhetysu (1st title)
- Runners-up: (Vietnam) VTV Bình Điền Long An
- Third place: (Thailand) Nakhon Ratchasima QminC
- Fourth place: (China) Beijing BAIC Motor

Tournament awards
- MVP: (Ukraine) Karina Denisova
- Best Setter: (Ukraine) Daria Sharhorodska
- Best OH: (Vietnam) Vi Thị Như Quỳnh; (Ukraine) Karina Denisova
- Best MB: (Kazakhstan) Valeriya Yakutina; (Thailand) Tichakorn Boonlert
- Best OPP: (Vietnam) Trần Thị Thanh Thúy
- Best Libero: (Vietnam) Nguyễn Khánh Đang

Tournament statistics
- Matches played: 20
- Attendance: 18,750 (938 per match)

The 2025 AVC Women's Volleyball Champions League was the first edition of the newly rebranded AVC Women's Volleyball Champions League and the 25th overall edition of the formerly named Asian Women's Club Volleyball Championship, an annual international women's volleyball club tournament organized by the Asian Volleyball Confederation (AVC) with the Philippine National Volleyball Federation (PNVF) and the Premier Volleyball League (PVL). It was held at the PhilSports Arena in Pasig, Philippines from 20 to 27 April 2025.

Zhetysu won the tournament for the first time by beating VTV Bình Điền Long An in the final and Karina Denisova named the MVP. Both teams qualified for the 2025 FIVB Volleyball Women's Club World Championship. Nakhon Ratchasima QminC claimed the bronze against Beijing BAIC Motor in the 3rd place match.

== Host selection ==
In January 2025, South Korea and Vietnam were originally considered as possible options to be the hosts. The next month, the PNVF announced that the Philippines would be the official host nation of the tournament.

== Participating teams ==
=== Teams by zonal association ===
Central Asia (CAVA)	East Asia (EAVA)	Oceania (OZVA)	Southeast Asia (SAVA)	West Asia (WAVA)
Iran; Kazakhstan	China; Chinese Taipei; Hong Kong; ~~Japan~~ (Note: Japan was supposed to send the 2023–24 V.League 1 champions, NEC Red Rockets to participate in the tournament, but later confirmed that they withdrew from the tournament due to scheduling conflicts with the ongoing 2024–25 SV.League.)	Australia	Philippines (hosts); Thailand; Vietnam	Jordan

=== Entrant teams ===
The AVC Women's Volleyball Champions League is an invitational tournament with a maximum of twelve teams allowed to enter. As the hosts, the Philippines were initially allowed to enter two teams. The hosts were later granted a wild card slot to field a third team, in replacement of Japan's withdrawal from the tournament. The following teams took part in the tournament.

Association	Team(s)	Domestic league standing
Australia	Queensland Pirates	2024–25 Australian Women's Volleyball League champions
China	Beijing BAIC Motor	2024–25 Chinese Volleyball Super League 5th place
Chinese Taipei	Taipower	2024–25 Taiwan Enterprise Volleyball League runners-up
Hong Kong	Hip Hing	2024 Hong Kong Women's Volleyball League champions
Iran	Saipa Tehran	2024–25 Iranian Women's Volleyball League champions
Jordan	Al Naser	2023–24 Jordan Volleyball Premier League champions
Kazakhstan	Zhetysu	2024–25 Kazakhstan Women's National League champions (Note: Zhetysu qualified by winning the 2024–25 Kazakhstan Super Cup.)
Philippines	Petro Gazz Angels	2024–25 Premier Volleyball League All-Filipino Conference champions (Note: As the 2024–25 PVL All-Filipino Conference is still ongoing days before the date of the draw, the league decided to field the top 2 teams in the preliminary round — Creamline Cool Smashers and Petro Gazz Angels. At the end of the tournament, the Petro Gazz Angels emerged as the champions, while the Creamline Cool Smashers was the conference runners-up.)
Philippines	Creamline Cool Smashers	2024–25 Premier Volleyball League All-Filipino Conference runners-up
Philippines	PLDT High Speed Hitters	2024–25 Premier Volleyball League All-Filipino Conference 5th place (wild card) (Note: Even if the hosts are only entitled with two teams, they are later granted a wildcard slot in place of Japan's withdrawal from the tournament. PVL announced on the draw date that the PLDT High Speed Hitters would be the Philippines' third representative as they are ranked 4th in the preliminaries. The PLDT High Speed Hitters then finished the tournament in 5th place.)
Thailand	Nakhon Ratchasima QminC	2023–24 Women's Volleyball Thailand League champions
Vietnam	VTV Bình Điền Long An	2024 Volleyball Vietnam League champions

== Squads ==
With the rebranded tournament, each team can now have a maximum of three foreign players in its roster that can play at any time. Previously, teams can only have two foreign players and only one of which can play at a time.

== Pools composition ==
For the first time since the 2016 edition, the teams were split into four pools with three teams each. The draw of lots took place at The Grand Fourwings Hotel Bangkok on 12 March 2025.

Teams were seeded in the first position of each pool following the serpentine system according to their FIVB Senior World Rankings as of 8 January 2025. All teams not seeded were drawn to take other available positions in the remaining lines, following the World Ranking. The host's two teams and the top two countries are automatically seeded as the first teams of the four pools. As the Philippines have fielded a third team as a wild card, it will be in the pot in accordance with the country's current FIVB ranking.

Seeded teams	Pot 1	Pot 2
(Philippines) Creamline Cool Smashers (52) (H-A) (Philippines) Petro Gazz Angels (52) (H-B) (China) Beijing BAIC Motor (5) (Thailand) Nakhon Ratchasima QminC (13)	(Kazakhstan) Zhetysu (31) (Vietnam) VTV Bình Điền Long An (32) (Chinese Taipei) Taipower (45) (Philippines) PLDT High Speed Hitters (52)	(Australia) Queensland Pirates (55) (Iran) Iranian Team (Note: The identity of the team from Iran was yet to be determined at the time of the draw. This slot was later filled in by Saipa Tehran.) (57) (Hong Kong) Hip Hing (60) (Jordan) Al Naser (–)

Drawing results

Pool A	Pool B	Pool C	Pool D
(Philippines) Creamline Cool Smashers (52) (H-A)	(Philippines) Petro Gazz Angels (52) (H-B)	(China) Beijing BAIC Motor (5)	(Thailand) Nakhon Ratchasima QminC (13)
(Kazakhstan) Zhetysu (31)	(Chinese Taipei) Taipower (45)	(Vietnam) VTV Bình Điền Long An (32)	(Philippines) PLDT High Speed Hitters (52)
(Jordan) Al Naser (–)	(Hong Kong) Hip Hing (60)	(Iran) Iranian Team (57)	(Australia) Queensland Pirates (55)

== Venue ==
The tournament will take place in Pasig in Metro Manila.

All matches	2025 AVC Women's Volleyball Champions League (Metro Manila)
Pasig, Philippines	2025 AVC Women's Volleyball Champions League (Metro Manila)
PhilSports Arena	2025 AVC Women's Volleyball Champions League (Metro Manila)
Capacity: 10,000	2025 AVC Women's Volleyball Champions League (Metro Manila)

== Pool standing procedure ==
1. Total number of victories (matches won, matches lost)
2. In the event of a tie, the following first tiebreaker will apply: The teams will be ranked by the most point gained per match as follows:
  - Match won 3–0 or 3–1: 3 points for the winner, 0 points for the loser
  - Match won 3–2: 2 points for the winner, 1 point for the loser
  - Match forfeited: 3 points for the winner, 0 points (0–25, 0–25, 0–25) for the loser
3. If teams are still tied after examining the number of victories and points gained, then the AVC will examine the results in order to break the tie in the following order:
  - Set quotient: if two or more teams are tied on the number of points gained, they will be ranked by the quotient resulting from the division of the number of all set won by the number of all sets lost.
  - Points quotient: if the tie persists based on the set quotient, the teams will be ranked by the quotient resulting from the division of all points scored by the total of points lost during all sets.
  - If the tie persists based on the point quotient, the tie will be broken based on the team that won the match of the Round Robin Phase between the tied teams. When the tie in point quotient is between three or more teams, these teams ranked taking into consideration only the matches involving the teams in question.

== Preliminary round ==
- All times are Philippine Standard Time (UTC+08:00).

=== Pool A ===
Pos	Team	Pld	W	L	Pts	SW	SL	SR	SPW	SPL	SPR	Qualification
1	(Kazakhstan) Zhetysu	2	2	0	6	6	0	MAX	150	86	1.744	Quarterfinals
2	(Philippines) Creamline Cool Smashers (H)	2	1	1	3	3	3	1.000	129	141	0.915	Quarterfinals
3	(Jordan) Al Naser	2	0	2	0	0	6	0.000	102	154	0.662	

Source: FIVB Live Center
(H) Host

Date	Time		Score		Set 1	Set 2	Set 3	Set 4	Set 5	Total	Report
20 Apr	16:00	Creamline Cool Smashers (Philippines)	3–0	(Jordan) Al Naser	29–27	25–20	25–19			79–66	P2 Report
21 Apr	19:00	Zhetysu (Kazakhstan)	3–0	(Philippines) Creamline Cool Smashers	25–16	25–17	25–17			75–50	P2 Report
22 Apr	13:00	Al Naser (Jordan)	0–3	(Kazakhstan) Zhetysu	10–25	15–25	11–25			36–75	P2 Report

=== Pool B ===
Pos	Team	Pld	W	L	Pts	SW	SL	SR	SPW	SPL	SPR	Qualification
1	(Chinese Taipei) Taipower	2	2	0	6	6	1	6.000	169	116	1.457	Quarterfinals
2	(Philippines) Petro Gazz Angels (H)	2	1	1	3	4	3	1.333	151	126	1.198	Quarterfinals
3	(Hong Kong) Hip Hing	2	0	2	0	0	6	0.000	72	150	0.480	

Source: FIVB Live Center
(H) Host

Date	Time		Score		Set 1	Set 2	Set 3	Set 4	Set 5	Total	Report
20 Apr	10:00	Taipower (Chinese Taipei)	3–0	(Hong Kong) Hip Hing	25–10	25–16	25–14			75–40	P2 Report
21 Apr	16:00	Petro Gazz Angels (Philippines)	1–3	(Chinese Taipei) Taipower	15–25	16–25	25–19	20–25		76–94	P2 Report
22 Apr	19:00	Hip Hing (Hong Kong)	0–3	(Philippines) Petro Gazz Angels	8–25	12–25	12–25			32–75	P2 Report

=== Pool C ===
Pos	Team	Pld	W	L	Pts	SW	SL	SR	SPW	SPL	SPR	Qualification
1	(China) Beijing BAIC Motor	2	2	0	5	6	2	3.000	186	159	1.170	Quarterfinals
2	(Vietnam) VTV Bình Điền Long An	2	1	1	4	5	4	1.250	189	183	1.033	Quarterfinals
3	(Iran) Saipa Tehran	2	0	2	0	1	6	0.167	142	175	0.811	

Source: FIVB Live Center

Date	Time		Score		Set 1	Set 2	Set 3	Set 4	Set 5	Total	Report
20 Apr	13:00	Beijing BAIC Motor (China)	3–0	(Iran) Saipa Tehran	28–26	25–22	25–19			78–67	P2 Report
21 Apr	10:00	VTV Bình Điền Long An (Vietnam)	2–3	(China) Beijing BAIC Motor	25–22	25–21	19–25	13–25	10–15	92–108	P2 Report
22 Apr	10:00	Saipa Tehran (Iran)	1–3	(Vietnam) VTV Bình Điền Long An	25–22	15–25	20–25	15–25		75–97	P2 Report

=== Pool D ===
Pos	Team	Pld	W	L	Pts	SW	SL	SR	SPW	SPL	SPR	Qualification
1	(Thailand) Nakhon Ratchasima QminC	2	2	0	5	6	2	3.000	181	141	1.284	Quarterfinals
2	(Philippines) PLDT High Speed Hitters (H)	2	1	1	4	5	3	1.667	178	149	1.195	Quarterfinals
3	(Australia) Queensland Pirates	2	0	2	0	0	6	0.000	81	150	0.540	

Source: FIVB Live Center
(H) Host

Date	Time		Score		Set 1	Set 2	Set 3	Set 4	Set 5	Total	Report
20 Apr	19:00	Queensland Pirates (Australia)	0–3	(Philippines) PLDT High Speed Hitters	19–25	12–25	12–25			43–75	P2 Report
21 Apr	13:00	Nakhon Ratchasima QminC (Thailand)	3–0	(Australia) Queensland Pirates	25–10	25–16	25–12			75–38	P2 Report
22 Apr	16:00	PLDT High Speed Hitters (Philippines)	2–3	(Thailand) Nakhon Ratchasima QminC	24–26	20–25	25–20	25–20	9–15	103–106	P2 Report

== Final round ==
- All times are Philippine Standard Time (UTC+08:00).

Quarterfinals
24 April
(Kazakhstan) Zhetysu	3
(Philippines) PLDT High Speed Hitters	0
24 April
(Philippines) Creamline Cool Smashers	0
(Thailand) Nakhon Ratchasima QminC	3
25 April
(Chinese Taipei) Taipower	1
(Vietnam) VTV Bình Điền Long An	3
25 April
(Philippines) Petro Gazz Angels	2
(China) Beijing BAIC Motor	3

Semifinals
26 April
(Kazakhstan) Zhetysu	3
(Thailand) Nakhon Ratchasima QminC	0
26 April
(Vietnam) VTV Bình Điền Long An	3
(China) Beijing BAIC Motor	0

Final
27 April
(Kazakhstan) Zhetysu	3
(Vietnam) VTV Bình Điền Long An	1
3rd place match
27 April
(Thailand) Nakhon Ratchasima QminC	3
(China) Beijing BAIC Motor	1

=== Quarterfinals ===
Date	Time		Score		Set 1	Set 2	Set 3	Set 4	Set 5	Total	Report
24 Apr	16:00	Zhetysu (Kazakhstan)	3–0	(Philippines) PLDT High Speed Hitters	25–13	25–22	25–20			75–55	P2 Report
24 Apr	19:00	Creamline Cool Smashers (Philippines)	0–3	(Thailand) Nakhon Ratchasima QminC	15–25	22–25	16–25			53–75	P2 Report
25 Apr	16:00	Taipower (Chinese Taipei)	1–3	(Vietnam) VTV Bình Điền Long An	20–25	25–17	22–25	26–28		93–95	P2 Report
25 Apr	19:00	Petro Gazz Angels (Philippines)	2–3	(China) Beijing BAIC Motor	29–31	25–19	25–20	20–25	12–15	111–110	P2 Report

=== Semifinals ===
Date	Time		Score		Set 1	Set 2	Set 3	Set 4	Set 5	Total	Report
26 Apr	16:00	Zhetysu (Kazakhstan)	3–0	(Thailand) Nakhon Ratchasima QminC	25–20	25–21	25–21			75–62	P2 Report
26 Apr	19:00	VTV Bình Điền Long An (Vietnam)	3–0	(China) Beijing BAIC Motor	25–15	25–19	25–21			75–55	P2 Report

=== 3rd place match ===
Date	Time		Score		Set 1	Set 2	Set 3	Set 4	Set 5	Total	Report
27 Apr	16:00	Nakhon Ratchasima QminC (Thailand)	3–1	(China) Beijing BAIC Motor	25–21	21–25	25–21	25–19		96–86	P2 Report

=== Final ===
Date	Time		Score		Set 1	Set 2	Set 3	Set 4	Set 5	Total	Report
27 Apr	19:00	Zhetysu (Kazakhstan)	3–1	(Vietnam) VTV Bình Điền Long An	25–14	20–25	25–23	25–18		95–80	P2 Report

== Final standing ==
Rank	Team
1st place, gold medalist(s)	(Kazakhstan) Zhetysu
2nd place, silver medalist(s)	(Vietnam) VTV Bình Điền Long An
3rd place, bronze medalist(s)	(Thailand) Nakhon Ratchasima QminC
4	(China) Beijing BAIC Motor
5	(Chinese Taipei) Taipower
5	(Philippines) PLDT High Speed Hitters
5	(Philippines) Petro Gazz Angels
5	(Philippines) Creamline Cool Smashers
9	(Jordan) Al Naser
9	(Hong Kong) Hip Hing
9	(Australia) Queensland Pirates
9	(Iran) Saipa Tehran

Qualified for the 2025 Club World Championship

2025 AVC Women's Champions League champions
(Kazakhstan)
Zhetysu
First title

14–woman roster
Perizat Nurbergenova, Karina Denisova (c), Yuliya Dymar, Valeriya Yakutina, Irina Kenzhebaeva, Mariya Syrygina, Kristina Belova, Daria Sharhorodska, Madina Beket, Tatyana Nikitina, Kristina Anikonova, Alina Ashkhabekova, Olga Khadzhioglo, Nataliya Borisenko
Head coach
(Serbia) Marko Gršić

== Awards ==
- Most Valuable Player

Karina Denisova (UKR) (Zhetysu)

- Best Setter

Daria Sharhorodska (UKR) (Zhetysu)

- Best Outside Spikers

Vi Thị Như Quỳnh (VIE) (VTV Bình Điền Long An)
Karina Denisova (UKR) (Zhetysu)

- Best Middle Blockers

Valeriya Yakutina (KAZ) (Zhetysu)
Tichakorn Boonlert (THA) (Nakhon Ratchasima QminC)

- Best Opposite Spiker

Trần Thị Thanh Thúy (VIE) (VTV Bình Điền Long An)

- Best Libero

Nguyễn Khánh Đang (VIE) (VTV Bình Điền Long An)

== See also ==
- 2025 AVC Men's Volleyball Champions League
