= Tijana Bošković =

Serbian volleyball player

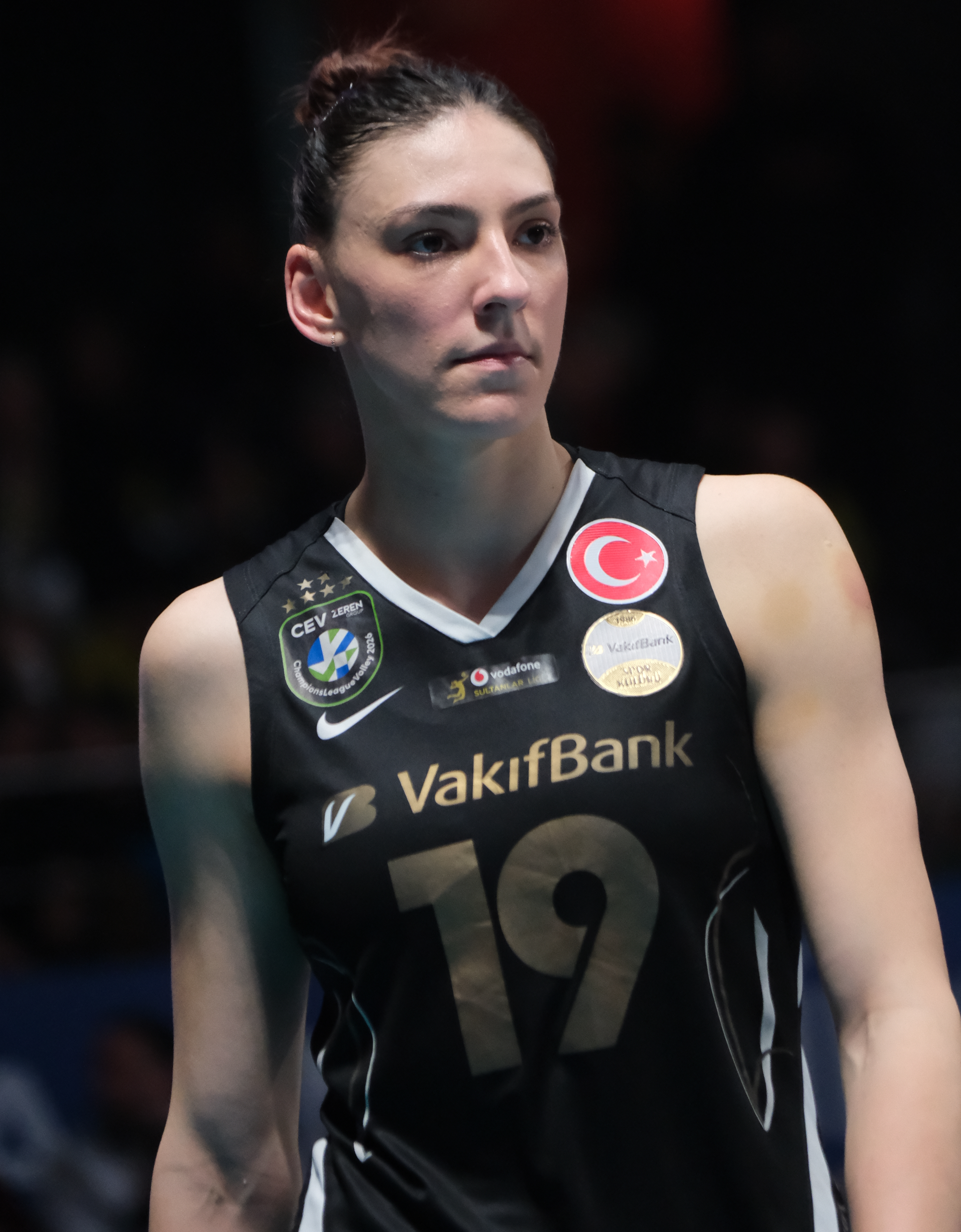
- Bošković with VakıfBank in 2026

Personal information
- Nickname: The Boss
- Nationality: Serbian
- Born: 8 March 1997 (age 29) Trebinje, Republika Srpska, Bosnia and Herzegovina
- Home town: Bileća, Republika Srpska, Bosnia and Herzegovina
- Height: 1.95 m (6 ft 5 in)
- Weight: 78 kg (172 lb)
- Spike: 329 cm (130 in)
- Block: 310 cm (122 in)

Volleyball information
- Position: Opposite spiker
- Current club: VakıfBank
- Number: 18 (national team)

Career
- Years: Team
- 2010–2011: (Bosnia and Herzegovina) ŽOK Hercegovac
- 2011–2015: (Serbia) ŽOK Partizan Vizura
- 2015–2025: (Turkey) Eczacıbaşı Dynavit
- 2025–: (Turkey) VakıfBank

National team
- Years: Team
- 2014–: Serbia
Honours
Women's volleyball
Representing Serbia
Olympic Games
Silver medal – second place	2016 Rio de Janeiro	Team
Bronze medal – third place	2020 Tokyo	Team
World Championship
Gold medal – first place	2018 Japan	Team
Gold medal – first place	2022 Netherlands/Poland	Team
European Championship
Gold medal – first place	2017 Azerbaijan/Georgia
Gold medal – first place	2019 Hungary/Poland/Slovakia/Turkey
Silver medal – second place	2021 Serbia/Bulgaria/Croatia/Romania
Silver medal – second place	2023 Belgium/Estonia/Germany/Italy
Bronze medal – third place	2015 Netherlands/Belgium
Bronze medal – third place	2026 Azerbaijan/Czechia/Sweden/Turkey
World Cup
Silver medal – second place	2015 Japan
FIVB World Grand Prix
Bronze medal – third place	2017 Nanjing
Junior European Championship
Gold medal – first place	2014 Tampere/Tartu
European Youth Olympic Festival
Silver medal – second place	2013 Utrecht

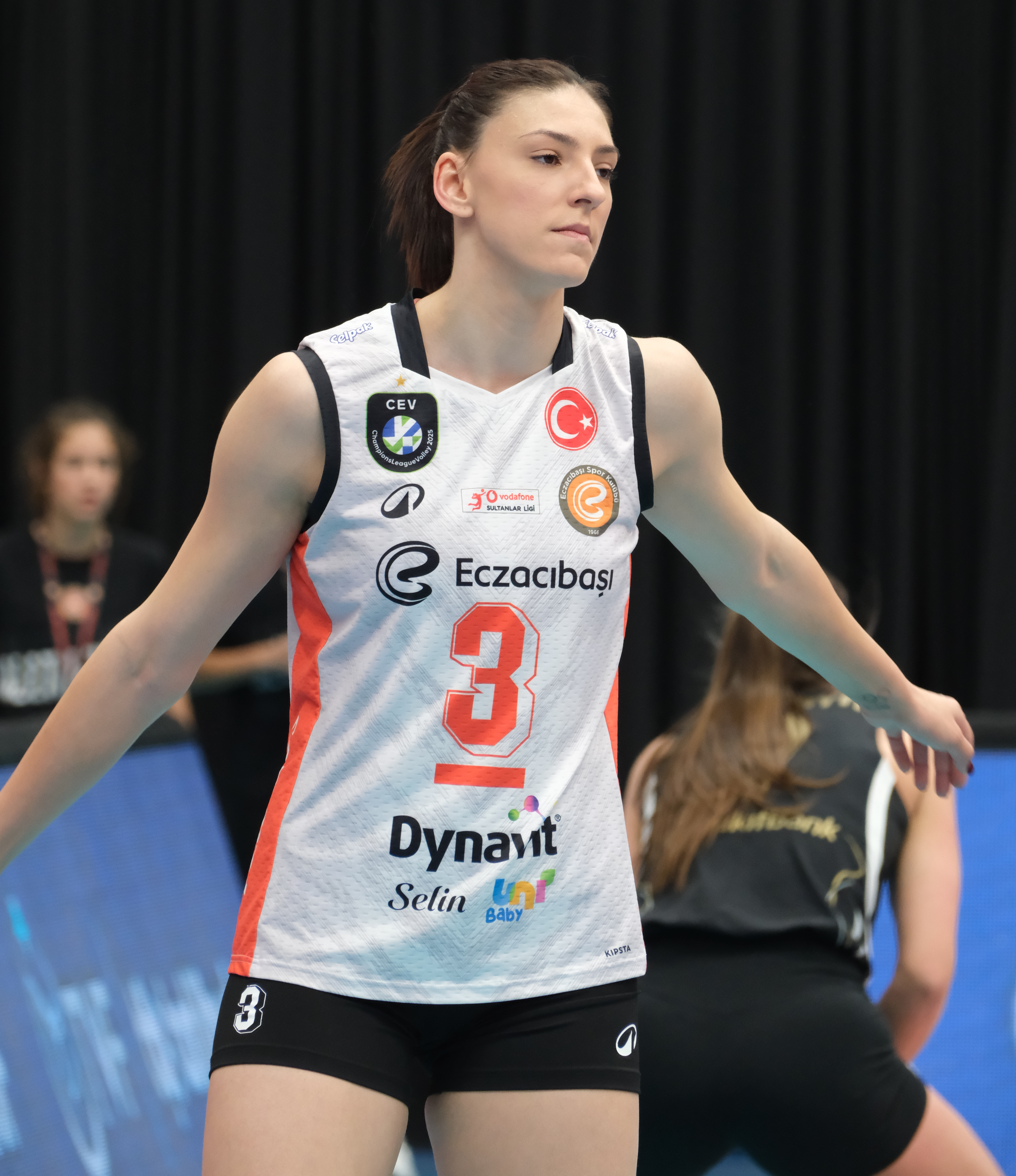
Bošković with Eczacıbaşı VitrA in 2025

Tijana Bošković (Serbian Cyrillic: Тијана Бошковић; born 8 March 1997) is a Serbian professional volleyball player of VakıfBank. A left-handed opposite, she has won gold medals with the Serbia women's national volleyball team at the 2018 and 2022 World Championships and the 2017 and 2019 European Championships. She is also a two-time Olympic medalist, having won silver at the 2016 Summer Olympics in Rio de Janeiro and bronze at the 2020 Summer Olympics in Tokyo.

Considered one of the world's best volleyball players, Bošković has been a key member of the Serbian team's offense since her debut with the national team in 2014. She was selected as the European Volleyball Confederation Female Volleyball Player of the Year for three consecutive years, in 2017, 2018, and 2019.

Bošković has broken several records for spike and serve speed in women's indoor volleyball. She currently holds the second- and fourth-fastest spike speed records, at 110.3 and 107.5 kilometers per hour (68.53 and 66.79 miles per hour) respectively.

== Early life ==
Bošković was born to Serb parents on 8 March 1997 in Trebinje, Republika Srpska, Bosnia and Herzegovina. Her younger brother, Vuk, is a basketball player and her older sister, Dajana, plays for the Bosnia and Herzegovina women's national volleyball team. The two sisters played their first international match against each other in 2021 Women's European Volleyball Championship.

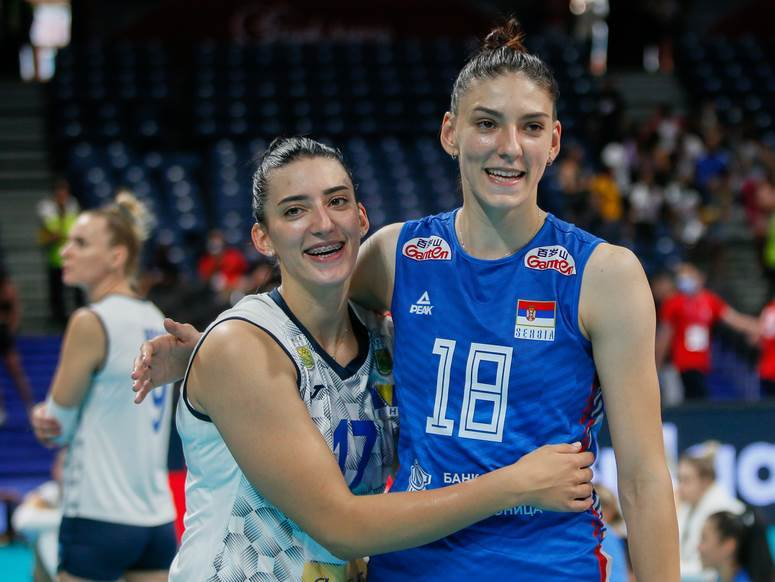
Bošković sisters in August 2021 playing against one another at the European Championship.

Bošković initially ventured into sports through karate and ultimately gravitated toward volleyball and basketball. Without any basketball clubs in her hometown to join, she began pursuing a career in volleyball. At age 14, she and her sister, then aged 17, moved to Belgrade to play volleyball.

== National team career ==
=== 2013–2014: Junior team ===
Bošković joined the Serbian junior team at age 15. In 2013, she won a silver medal at the 2013 European Youth Olympic Festival, where she was named the Most Valuable Player and Best Spiker. In 2014, she led Serbia's U19 national team to a gold medal at the 2014 Women's Junior European Volleyball Championship.

=== 2014–2016: Senior team debut and Rio de Janeiro Summer Olympics ===
Bošković made her debut with Serbia's senior national team in 2014, where she became Serbia's leading scorer at the 2014 FIVB Volleyball Women's World Championship. The next year, she won a silver medal at the 2015 FIVB Volleyball Women's World Cup. Serbia's second-place finished secured the team a spot at the 2016 Summer Olympics in Rio de Janeiro, where the team earned a silver medal after a four-set defeat in the finals by China. This marked Serbia's first-ever women's volleyball medal. During the tournament, Bošković served a 100 km/h serve, the fastest-ever serve at the Olympics at the time. The record was broken in a match later that day by Italian player Paola Egonu.

=== 2017–2021: Continued success and Tokyo Summer Olympics ===
In 2017, Bošković won bronze with the national team at 2017 FIVB Volleyball World Grand Prix, where she was named Best Opposite Player of the tournament. At the 2017 Women's European Volleyball Championship, Bošković led her team to a victory over the Netherlands, resulting in Serbia's second European title. With a total of 130 points, she was the most productive offensive player of the tournament and was named Most Valuable Player.

During the first edition of the FIVB Women's Volleyball Nations League, Bošković was the leading scorer with 206 total points. Serbia ranked 5th in the tournament. That same year, Bošković led Serbia to its first-ever title at the 2018 FIVB Volleyball Women's World Championship, where she was once again named Most Valuable Player after amassing a total of 193 points. Bošković and Serbia repeated their European title at the 2019 Women's European Volleyball Championship, where she was awarded Most Valuable Player and Best Opposite.

At the 2020 Summer Olympics, Serbia earned a bronze medal, with Bošković being named Best Opposite. She became the first player to score 30 or more points in three different matches within a single Olympics tournament.

=== 2022–present: Second World Championship title and Paris Summer Olympics ===
At the 2022 FIVB Volleyball Women's World Championship, Serbia defended its title and Bošković was named Most Valuable Player and Best Opposite of the tournament. She became the second player in history, after Regla Torres of Cuba, to achieve back-to-back World Championship MVP awards, making her the sole player in the history of European volleyball to attain this feat.

At the 2023 Women's European Volleyball Championship, Bošković and the team advanced to the final for the fourth consecutive edition, where they ultimately placed second. Bošković is part of Serbia's 12-player roster at the 2024 Summer Olympics in Paris.

== Club career ==
Since 2015, Bošković has played professionally for Eczacıbaşı in the Turkish Women's Volleyball League. She won her first trophy with the team at the 2016 Club World Championship in the Philippines, where she was the tournament's Most Valuable Player and Best Opposite. As a member of Eczacıbaşı, she has won eight trophies in total: three times at the Turkish Women's Volleyball Super Cup (2018, 2019 and 2020), twice at the Women's CEV Cup (2017–18 and 2021–22), twice at the FIVB Club World Championship (2016 and 2023) and once at the Turkish Women's Volleyball Cup (2018–19).

== Recognition ==
Bošković has received widespread acknowledgement for her athletic success. In 2017, President Milorad Dodik of Republika Srpska donated KM 20,000 (US $11,000) to Bošković and two of her teammates. In 2018, Bosnia and Herzegovina's Ministry of Foreign Affairs, Igor Crnadak, presented Bošković with a diplomatic passport. As part of Serbia's national women's volleyball team, Bošković was also presented with a diplomatic passport from Serbia by the Minister of Foreign Affairs, Ivica Dačić.

In July 2019, a sports hall in Bileća was named after Bošković.

== Awards ==
=== National team ===
==== Junior team ====
- 2013 European Youth Olympic Festival – Silver Medal
- 2014 Junior European Championship – Gold Medal

==== Senior team ====
- 2015 World Cup – Silver Medal
- 2015 European Championship – Bronze Medal
- 2016 Olympic Games – Silver Medal
- 2017 World Grand Prix – Bronze Medal
- 2017 European Championship – Gold Medal
- 2018 World Championship – Gold Medal
- 2019 European Championship – Gold Medal
- 2020 Olympic Games – Bronze Medal
- 2021 European Championship – Silver Medal
- 2022 World Championship – Gold Medal
- 2023 European Championship – Silver Medal
- 2026 European Championship - Bronze Medal

=== Club ===
Serbian SuperCup

- 2013 Serbian Super Cup – Champion, with OK Partizan Vizura
- 2014 Serbian Super Cup – Champion, with OK Partizan Vizura

Serbian Cup

- 2012/13 Serbian Cup – Runner-Up, with OK Partizan Vizura
- 2013/14 Serbian Cup – Runner-Up, with OK Partizan Vizura
- 2014/15 Serbian Cup – Champion, with OK Partizan Vizura

Serbian SuperLeague

- 2011/12 Wiener SuperLiga – Third place, with OK Partizan Vizura
- 2012/13 Wiener SuperLiga – Third place, with OK Partizan Vizura
- 2013/14 Wiener SuperLiga – Champion, with OK Partizan Vizura
- 2014/15 Wiener SuperLiga – Champion, with OK Partizan Vizura

Turkish Super Cup

- 2018 Spor Toto Champion's Cup – Champion, with Eczacıbaşı VitrA
- 2019 Spor Toto Champion's Cup – Champion, with Eczacıbaşı VitrA
- 2020 AXA Sigorta Champion's Cup – Champion, with Eczacıbaşı VitrA
- 2021 AXA Sigorta Champion's Cup – Runner-Up, with Eczacıbaşı Dynavit
- 2024 AXA Sigorta Champion's Cup – Runner-Up, with Eczacıbaşı Dynavit
- 2026 AXA Sigorta Champion's Cup – Champion, with VakifBank Istanbul

Turkish Cup

- 2017/18 Turkish Volleyball Cup – Runner-Up, with Eczacıbaşı VitrA
- 2018/19 AXA Sigorta Volleyball Cup – Champion, with Eczacıbaşı VitrA
- 2020/21 AXA Sigorta Volleyball Cup – Runner-Up, with Eczacıbaşı VitrA
- 2023/24 AXA Sigorta Volleyball Cup – Runner-Up, with Eczacıbaşı Dynavit
- 2024/25 AXA Sigorta Volleyball Cup – Runner-Up, with Eczacıbaşı Dynavit
- 2025/26 AXA Sigorta Volleyball Cup – Champion, with VakifBank Istanbul

Turkish League

- 2015/16 Turkish Volleyball League – Third place, with Eczacıbaşı VitrA
- 2017–18 Turkish Volleyball League – Runner-Up, with Eczacıbaşı VitrA
- 2018–19 Turkish Volleyball League – Runner-Up, with Eczacıbaşı VitrA
- 2021–22 Turkish Volleyball League – Third place, with Eczacıbaşı Dynavit
- 2022–23 Turkish Volleyball League – Runner-Up, with Eczacıbaşı Dynavit
- 2023–24 Turkish Volleyball League – Runner-Up, with Eczacıbaşı Dynavit
- 2024–25 Turkish Volleyball League – Third place, with Eczacıbaşı Dynavit
- 2025–26 Turkish Volleyball League – Champion, with VakifBank Istanbul

CEV Cup

- 2017/18 CEV Cup – Champion, with Eczacıbaşı VitrA
- 2021/22 CEV Cup – Champion, with Eczacıbaşı Dynavit

CEV Champions League

- 2016/17 CEV Champions League – Bronze Medal, with Eczacıbaşı VitrA
- 2022/23 CEV Champions League – Runner-Up, with Eczacıbaşı Dynavit
- 2023/24 CEV Champions League – Third place, with Eczacıbaşı Dynavit
- 2025/26 CEV Champions League - Gold Medal with VakifBank Istanbul

FIVB Volleyball Club World Championship

- 2016 Club World Championship – Champion, with Eczacıbaşı VitrA
- 2018 Club World Championship – Bronze Medal, with Eczacıbaşı VitrA
- 2019 Club World Championship – Runner-Up, with Eczacıbaşı VitrA
- 2022 Club World Championship – Bronze Medal, with Eczacıbaşı Dynavit
- 2023 Club World Championship – Champion, with Eczacıbaşı Dynavit

=== Individual Awards (awarded) ===
==== National team ====
- 2013 European Youth Olympic Festival "Most valuable player"
- 2014 Junior European Championship "Most valuable player"
- 2017 FIVB World Grand Prix "Best opposite"
- 2017 European Championship "Most valuable player"
- 2018 World Championship "Most valuable player"
- 2019 European Championship "Most valuable player"
- 2019 European Championship "Best opposite"
- 2020 Summer Olympics "Best opposite"
- 2022 World Championship "Most valuable player"
- 2022 World Championship "Best opposite"

==== Club ====
- 2016 FIVB Club World Championship "Most valuable player"
- 2016 FIVB Club World Championship "Best opposite"
- 2017 FIVB Club world Championship "Best opposite"
- 2017/18 Women's CEV Cup "Most valuable player"
- 2018 FIVB Club World Championship "Best opposite"
- 2018/19 Turkish Cup "Most valuable player"
- 2018/19 Turkish League Final Series "Best opposite"
- 2019 Turkish Super Cup "Most valuable player"
- 2020 Turkish Super Cup "Most valuable player"
- 2023 FIVB Club World Championship "Most valuable player"
- 2023 Club World Championship "Best opposite"
- 2023/24 Turkish League Final Series "Best opposite"
- 2025/26 Women’s CEV Championship “Best opposite”
- 2025/26 Women's CEV Championship Finals "Most valuable player"

=== Individual awards (not awarded) ===
==== National team ====
- 2013 European Youth Olympic Festival – Best spiker
- 2018 Nations League – Best spiker
- 2018 World Championship – Best attacker
- 2019 Intercontinental Olympic Qualification – Pool A best attacker
- 2019 Intercontinental Olympic Qualification – Pool A best server
- 2020 Summer Olympics – Best scorer
- 2020 Summer Olympics – Best attacker
- 2021 European Championship Fans' All Star Team – Best opposite
- 2021 European Championship – Best scorer
- 2021 European Championship – Best spiker
- 2022 World Championship – Best spiker
- 2023 European Championship – Best scorer
- 2023 European Championship – Best spiker

==== Club ====
- 2012/13 Serbian Cup – Best outside hitter
- 2016/17 Turkish League Regular Season – Best opposite
- 2016/17 CEV Champions League – Best server
- 2016/17 CEV Champions League – Best scorer
- 2017 FIVB Club World Championship – Best spiker
- 2017 FIVB Club World Championship – Best server
- 2017/18 CEV Cup – Best scorer
- 2017/18 CEV Cup – Best spiker
- 2018 Turkish Super Cup – Best scorer
- 2018 Turkish Super Cup – Best attacker
- 2017/18 Turkish League Regular Season – Best opposite
- 2018 FIVB Club World Championship – Best spiker
- 2018/19 Turkish Cup – Best scorer
- 2019 Turkish Super Cup – Best opposite
- 2019 Turkish Super Cup – Best scorer
- 2019 FIVB Club World Championship – Best server
- 2019/20 Turkish League Regular Season – Best scorer
- 2019/20 Turkish League Regular Season – Best opposite
- 2020 Turkish Super Cup – Best attacker
- 2020/21 Turkish Cup – Best scorer
- 2020/21 Turkish League Regular Season – Best scorer
- 2021/22 Women's CEV Cup – Best scorer
- 2021/22 Women's CEV Cup – Best spiker
- 2022 FIVB Club World Championship – Best server
- 2023/24 Turkish Cup – Best scorer
- 2023/24 Turkish League Regular Season – Best opposite
- 2023/24 CEV Champions League – Best scorer
- 2023/24 CEV Champions League – Best spiker

== Individual achievements ==
- 2013 OSS (Serbian: Odbojkaški savez Srbije – Volleyball Federation of Serbia) Best Young Volleyball Player of the Year
- 2014 OSS Best Young Volleyball Player of the Year
- 2016 OSS Best Female Volleyball Player of the Year
- 2017 OSS Best Female Volleyball Player of the Year
- 2018 OSS Best Female Volleyball Player of the Year
- 2019 OSS Best Female Volleyball Player of the Year
- 2022 OSS Best Female Volleyball Player of the Year
- 2017 Young Athlete of The Year by the Serbian Olympic Committee
- 2018 Sport Woman of The Year by the Serbian Olympic Committee
- 2019 Sport Woman of The Year by the Serbian Olympic Committee
- 2022 Team Sport Athlete of The Year by the Serbian Olympic Committee
- 2018 The best Athlete of the Republic of Srpska of the year
- 2019 The best Athlete of the Republic of Srpska of the year
- 2022 The Best Athlete of the Republic of Srpska of the Year
- 2017 CEV Female Volleyball Player of the Year
- 2018 CEV Female Volleyball Player of the Year
- 2019 CEV Female Volleyball Player of the Year

== Career statistics ==
=== Junior team ===
Tournament	Year	Played		Points		Serve		Reception						Attack						Block	
Tournament	Year	M	S	Tot	per set	Ace	per set	Tot	Err	Neg	Exc	Exc%	Eff	Tot	Err	Blk	Exc	Exc%	Eff	Pts	per set
Junior World Championship – European Qualification	2012	3	10	48	4.8	6	0.6	–						78	5	8	37	47.4%	0.31	5	0.5
U18 World Championship	2013	7	28	137	4.89	9	0.32	–						289	25		108	37.4%	0.29	16	0.57
U20 World Championship	2013	8	27	135	5	7	0.26	–						279	35		112	40.1%	0.28	16	0.59
U19 European Championship	2014	9	29	175	6.03	12	0.41	–						282	24	9	146	51.8%	0.40	17	0.59

=== National team ===
==== Major tournaments ====
Tournament	Year	Played		Points		Serve		Reception						Attack						Block	
Tournament	Year	M	S	Tot	per set	Ace	per set	Tot	Err	Neg	Exc	Exc%	Eff	Tot	Err	Blk	Exc	Exc%	Eff	Pts	per set
European Championship	2015	5	17	89	5.24	7	0.41	–						166	20	16	74	44.6%	0.23	8	0.47
European Championship	2017	6	18	130	7.22	11	0.61	3	0	2	1	33.3%	0.33	198	17	13	109	55.1%	0.4	10	0.56
European Championship	2019	9	27	142	5.26	14	0.52	1	0	0	1	100%	1	269	22	20	118	43.9%	0.28	10	0.37
European Championship	2021	9	31	215	6.94	7	0.23	–						375	35	20	196	52.3%	0.38	14	0.45
European Championship	2023	9	32	229	7.16	15	0.47	–						367	24	18	199	54.2%	0.43	15	0.47
European Championship	Total	38	125	805	6.44	54	0.43							1375	118	87	696	50.6%	0.36	57	0.46
World Championship	2014	8	27	146	5.41	4	0.15	–						274	37		119	43.4%	0.3	23	0.85
World Championship	2018	11	34	193	5.68	6	0.18	–						328	50		176	53.7%	0.38	11	0.32
World Championship	2022	11	36	240	6.67	8	0.22	–						394	49		219	55.6%	0.43	13	0.36
World Championship	Total	30	97	579	5.97	18	0.19							996	136		514	51.6%	0.38	47	0.48
Olympic Games	2016	8	26	137	5.27	10	0.38	–						238	52		116	48.7%	0.27	11	0.42
Olympic Games	2021	8	24	192	8	12	0.5	–						313	51		165	52.7%	0.36	15	0.63
Olympic Games	Total	16	50	329	6.58	22	0.44							551	103		281	51.0%	0.32	26	0.52

==== Other tournaments ====
Tournament	Year	Played		Points		Serve		Reception						Attack						Block	
Tournament	Year	M	S	Tot	per set	Ace	per set	Tot	Err	Neg	Exc	Exc%	Eff	Tot	Err	Blk	Exc	Exc%	Eff	Pts	per set
World Grand Prix	2015	4	16	41	2.56	2	0.13	–						73	11		30	41.1%	0.26	9	0.56
World Grand Prix	2016	3	14	60	4.29	2	0.14	–						127	20		50	39.4%	0.24	4	0.29
World Grand Prix	2017	8	29	144	4.97	15	0.52	–						239	40		123	51.5%	0.35	10	0.34
World Grand Prix	Total	15	58	245	4.22	19	0.33							439	71		203	46.2%	0.30	23	0.40
Volleyball Nations League	2018	13	47	238	5.06	8	0.17	–						418	80		206	49.28%	0.30	24	0.51
Volleyball Nations League	2019	2	6	39	6.50	3	0.5	–						73	10		35	47.9%	0.34	1	0.17
Volleyball Nations League	2023	4	16	109	6.81	4	0.25	–						165	13	7	97	58.8%	0.47	8	0.5
Volleyball Nations League	Total	19	69	386	5.59	15	0.22							656	110		338	51.99%	0.35	33	0.48
World Championship – European Qualification	2017	4	11	82	7.45	6	0.55	3	0	1	0	0	0	117	6	3	69	59.0%	0.51	7	0.64
Intercontinental Olympic Qualification	2019	3	10	75	7.5	7	0.7	–						109	13		62	56.9%	0.45	6	0.6
Intercontinental Olympic Qualification	2023	5	17	129	7.59	13	0.76	–						204	25		105	51.5%	0.39	11	0.65
Intercontinental Olympic Qualification	Total	8	27	204	7.56	20	0.74							313	38		167	53.4%	0.41	17	0.63
World Cup	2015	10	35	159	4.54	8	0.23	–						269	47		131	48.7%	0.31	20	0.63

=== Season by club ===
==== League (regular season and finals) ====
Team	League	Season	Played		Points		Serve		Reception						Attack						Block	
Team	League	Season	M	S	Tot	per set	Ace	per set	Tot	Err	Neg	Exc	Exc%	Eff	Tot	Err	Blk	Exc	Exc%	Eff	Pts	per set
Partizan	Serbian Super League	2011–12	6	9	3	0.33	0	0	2	0	1	0	0	0	7	1	0	3	42.9%	0.29	0	0
Partizan	Serbian Super League	2012–13	25	87	335	3.85	22	0.25	54	13	5	15	27.8%	0.04	638	65	26	278	43.6%	0.29	37	0.43
Partizan	Serbian Super League	2013–14	22	72	372	5.17	28	0.39	–						676	59	32	304	45.0%	0.32	40	0.56
Partizan	Serbian Super League	2014–15	6	17	88	5.18	4	0.24	–						162	16	8	74	45.7%	0.31	10	0.59
Partizan	Serbian Super League	Total	59	185	798	4.31	54	0.29							1,483	141	66	659	44.4%	0.3	87	0.47
Eczacıbaşı	Turkish League	2015–16	23	79	316	4	14	0.18	–						633	56	32	274	43.3%	0.29	28	0.35
Eczacıbaşı	Turkish League	2016–17	25	91	374	4.11	34	0.37	–						652	57	43	300	46.0%	0.31	40	0.44
Eczacıbaşı	Turkish League	2017–18	30	105	558	5.31	36	0.34	–						938	92	70	481	51.3%	0.34	41	0.39
Eczacıbaşı	Turkish League	2018–19	28	93	534	5.74	49	0.53	–						924	91	58	442	47.8%	0.32	43	0.46
Eczacıbaşı	Turkish League	2019–20	18	66	402	6.09	40	0.61	–						600	48	25	323	53.8%	0.42	39	0.59
Eczacıbaşı	Turkish League	2020–21	27	104	692	6.65	41	0.39	–						1164	99	64	602	51.7%	0.38	49	0.47
Eczacıbaşı	Turkish League	2021–22	24	81	483	5.96	18	0.22	–						828	51	47	428	51.7%	0.4	37	0.46
Eczacıbaşı	Turkish League	2022–23	21	70	426	6.09	17	0.24	–						701	51	57	382	54.5%	0.39	27	0.39
Eczacıbaşı	Turkish League	2023–24	27	93	568	6.11	43	0.46							964	68	51	493	51.1%	0.39	32	0.34
Eczacıbaşı	Turkish League	Total	223	782	4,353	5.57	292	0.37							7,400	613	447	3,725	50.2%	0.36	336	0.43

==== Domestic cups and regional competitions ====
Team	Season	League	Played		Points		Serve		Reception						Attack						Block	
Team	Season	League	M	S	Tot	per set	Ace	per set	Tot	Err	Neg	Exc	Exc%	Eff	Tot	Err	Blk	Exc	Exc%	Eff	Pts	per set
Partizan	2012–13	Serbian Cup	5	16	77	4.81	6	0.36	12	2	0	1	8.3%	−0.08	119	12	4	60	50.4%	0.37	11	0.69
Partizan	2013–14	Serbian Cup	2	6	55	9.17	3	0.5	–						50	3	6	21	42.0%	0.24	2	0.33
Partizan	2014–15	Serbian Cup	2	3	16	5.33	2	0.67	–						23	1	0	14	60.9%	0.57	0	0
Partizan	2014–15	Champions League	3	11	66	6	2	0.18	–						155	13	9	62	40.0%	0.26	2	0.18
Partizan	2014–15	Season Total	5	14	82	5.86	4	0.29							178	14	9	76	42.7%	0.30	2	0.14
Eczacıbaşı	2015–16	Champions League	8	25	101	4.04	5	0.2	2	0	1	0	0	0	194	16	9	76	39.2%	0.26	20	0.8
Eczacıbaşı	2016–17	Turkish Cup	2	8	22	2.75	1	0.13	–						50	7	6	17	34.0%	0.08	4	0.5
Eczacıbaşı	2016–17	Club World Championship	4	17	85	5	7	0.41	–						150	20		64	42.7%	0.29	14	0.82
Eczacıbaşı	2016–17	Champions League	14	51	221	4.33	26	0.50	1	1	0	0	0	0	381	36	17	178	46.7%	0.33	17	0.33
Eczacıbaşı	2016–17	Season Total	20	76	328	4.32	34	0.45							581	86		259	44.6%	0.30	35	0.46
Eczacıbaşı	2017–18	Turkish Cup	3	10	53	5.3	3	0.3	–						84	10	7	43	51.2%	0.31	7	0.7
Eczacıbaşı	2017–18	Club World Championship	5	19	96	5.05	10	0.53	–						150	20		78	52.0%	0.39	8	0.42
Eczacıbaşı	2017–18	CEV Cup	10	32	193	6.03	14	0.44	1	1	0	0	0	0	270	21	14	164	60.7%	0.48	15	0.47
Eczacıbaşı	2017–18	Season Total	18	61	342	5.61	27	0.44							504	72		285	56.6%	0.42	30	0.49
Eczacıbaşı	2018–19	Turkish Super Cup	1	4	24	6	0	0	–						46	2	5	23	50.0%	0.35	1	0.17
Eczacıbaşı	2018–19	Turkish Cup	3	12	62	5.17	3	0.25	–						101	7	7	54	53.5%	0.4	5	0.42
Eczacıbaşı	2018–19	Club World Championship	4	15	81	5.4	5	0.33	–						132	16		69	52.3%	0.4	7	0.47
Eczacıbaşı	2018–19	Champions League	7	26	142	5.46	7	0.27	–						246	27	13	116	47.2%	0.31	19	0.73
Eczacıbaşı	2018–19	Season Total	15	57	309	5.42	15	0.26							525	77		262	49.9%	0.35	32	0.56
Eczacıbaşı	2019–20	Turkish Super Cup	1	5	27	5.4	1	0.2	–						52	7	2	23	44.2%	0.27	3	0.6
Eczacıbaşı	2019–20	Club World Championship	5	19	114	6	14	0.74	–						194	32		91	46.9%	0.3	9	0.47
Eczacıbaşı	2019–20	Champions League	6	24	124	5.17	9	0.37	2	0	1	0	0	0	195	17	11	104	53.3%	0.39	11	0.46
Eczacıbaşı	2019–20	Season Total	12	48	265	5.52	24	0.5							441	69		218	49.4%	0.34	23	0.48
Eczacıbaşı	2020–21	Turkish Super Cup	1	5	35	7	2	0.4	–						61	9	1	33	54.1%	0.38	0	0
Eczacıbaşı	2020–21	Turkish Cup	6	19	118	6.21	8	0.42	–						180	16	8	102	56.7%	0.43	8	0.42
Eczacıbaşı	2020–21	Champions League	8	30	236	6.05	5	0.17	–						325	21	18	157	48.3%	0.36	17	0.57
Eczacıbaşı	2020–21	Season Total	15	54	389	7.20	15	0.28							566	46	27	292	51.6%	0.39	25	0.46
Eczacıbaşı	2021–22	Turkish Super Cup	1	3	21	7	2	0.67	–						31	2	0	17	54.8%	0.48	2	0.67
Eczacıbaşı	2021–22	Turkish Cup	4	10	55	5.5	3	0.3	–						90	7	8	44	48.9%	0.32	8	0.8
Eczacıbaşı	2021–22	CEV Cup	8	24	170	7.08	15	0.63	1	1	0	0	0	0	237	15	10	134	56.5%	0.46	21	0.88
Eczacıbaşı	2021–22	Season Total	13	37	246	6.65	20	0.54							358	24	18	195	54.5%	0.43	31	0.84
Eczacıbaşı	2022–23	Turkish Cup	1	3	21	7	0	0	–						40	2	4	18	45.0%	0.3	3	1
Eczacıbaşı	2022–23	Club World Championship	4	14	95	6.79	8	0.57	–						145	17		82	56.6%	0.45	5	0.36
Eczacıbaşı	2022–23	Champions League	7	28	169	6.04	6	0.21	1	1	0	0	0	0	306	26	25	148	48.4%	0.32	15	0.54
Eczacıbaşı	2022–23	Season Total	12	45	285	6.33	14	0.31							491	74		248	50.5%	0.35	23	0.51
Eczacıbaşı	2023–24	Turkish Cup	3	12	82	6.83	4	0.33	–						151	9	10	78	51.7%	0.39	0	0
Eczacıbaşı	2023–24	Club World Championship	4	15	90	6	8	0.53	–						142	16		78	54.9%	0.44	4	0.33
Eczacıbaşı	2023–24	Champions League	11	42	259	6.17	17	0.40	–						454	35	24	221	48.7%	0.36	21	0.50
Eczacıbaşı	2023–24	Season Total	18	69	431	6.25	29	0.42							747	94		377	50.5%	0.38	25	0.36

Awards
Preceded by (United States) Kimberly Hill	Most Valuable Player of World Championship; 2018; 2022	Succeeded by (Italy) Alessia Orro
Preceded by (United States) Jordan Larson - (Sweden) Isabelle Haak	Most Valuable Player of Club World Championship; 2016; 2023	Succeeded by (China) Zhu Ting - (Sweden) Isabelle Haak
Preceded by (Russia) Tatiana Kosheleva	Most Valuable Player of European Championship; 2017; 2019	Succeeded by (Italy) Paola Egonu
Preceded by (Netherlands) Lonneke Slöetjes	Best Opposite of Olympic Games; 2020	Succeeded by (Italy) Paola Egonu
Preceded by (Italy) Paola Egonu	Best Opposite of World Championship; 2022	Succeeded by (Turkey) Melissa Vargas
Preceded by (Ukraine) Olesia Rykhliuk - (Sweden) Isabelle Haak	Best Opposite of Club World Championship; 2016; 2017; 2018; 2023	Succeeded by (Sweden) Isabelle Haak - (Sweden) Isabelle Haak
Preceded by (Netherlands) Lonneke Slöetjes	Best Opposite of FIVB World Grand Prix; 2017	Succeeded by –
Preceded by (Netherlands) Lonneke Slöetjes	Best Opposite of European Championship; 2019; 2021	Succeeded by (Turkey) Melissa Vargas
