= Dajana Bošković =

Bosnia and Herzegovina volleyball player (born 1994)

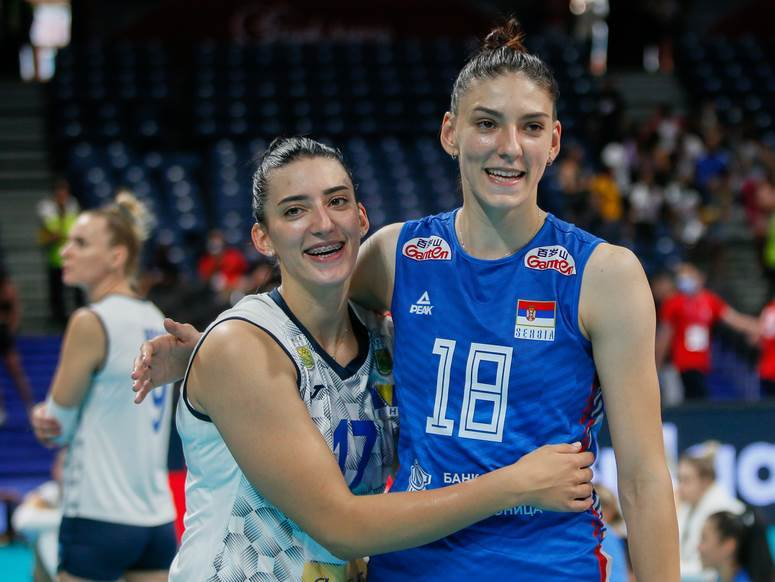
- Dajana (left) with her sister, Tijana

Personal information
- Full name: Dajana Bošković
- Nationality: Bosnian / Serbian
- Born: April 11, 1994 (age 32); Trebinje, Republika Srpska, Bosnia and Herzegovina
- Hometown: Bileća, Republika Srpska, Bosnia and Herzegovina
- Height: 1.86 m (6 ft 1 in)
- Weight: 86 kg (190 lb)
- Spike: 300 cm (118 in)
- Block: 295 cm (116 in)
- Education: University of Texas San Antonio (2013–2017)

Volleyball information
- Position: Opposite
- Current club: Energa MKS Kalisz
- Number: 17

Career
Years	Teams
2011–2012; 2012–2013; 2017–2018; 2018–2019; 2019–2021; 2021–2022; 2022–2023; 2022–2023; 2023–2024	Dinamo Pančevo; OK Vizura; Enea PTPS Piła; Sarıyer Belediyesi; Kuzeyboru; Crvena Zvezda; Shenzhen Zhongsai; CSM Volei Alba Blaj; Energa MKS Kalisz
Honours
Women's volleyball
Representing Bosnia and Herzegovina
European Silver League
Gold medal – first place	2021 Slovenia	Team

Dajana Bošković (Serbian Cyrillic: Дајана Бошковић; born 11 March 1994) is a female volleyball player from Bosnia and Herzegovina, playing as an opposite-hitter.

== Early life ==
Bošković was born to Serb parents, Ljupko and Vesna, on 11 March 1994 in Trebinje, Republika Srpska, Bosnia and Herzegovina. Her younger brother, Vuk, is a basketball player and her younger sister, Tijana plays volleyball. She started playing volleyball at 12.

== International ==
She plays for the Bosnia and Herzegovina national team while her sister Tijana chose to play for the Serbia women's national volleyball team. The two sisters played their first international match against each other in 2021 Women's European Volleyball Championship, on 19 August 2021. She also represented Bosnia and Herzegovina at the 2023 Women's European Volleyball Championship.

== Honours ==
=== Club ===
(Serbia) OK Vizura

- Serbian League 2012–13
- Serbian Cup 2012–13

(United States) UTSA Roadrunners

- Conference USA 2013–14
- Conference USA 2015–16
- Conference USA 2014–15

(Poland) Enea PTPS Piła

- Polish Cup 2017–18

(Turkey) Sarıyer Belediyesi

- Sultanlar Ligi 2018–19

(China) Shenzhen Zhongsai

- Chinese Volleyball Super League 2022–23

(Romania) CSM Volei Alba Blaj

- CEV Cup 2022–23
- Romania A1 2022–23
- Cupa României 2022–23

(Serbia) Crvena Zvezda

- Serbian League 2021–22
- Serbian Cup 2021–22

=== Individual awards ===
- 2021–22: Serbian Cup - Best opposite
- 2021: European Silver League - Best scorer
