= Sara Lozo =

Serbian volleyball player (born 1997)

Personal information
- Nationality: Serbian
- Born: 29 April 1997 (age 29) Jagodina, Serbia, FR Yugoslavia
- Height: 1.86 m (6 ft 1 in)
- Weight: 61 kg (134 lb)
- Spike: 310 cm (122 in)
- Block: 300 cm (118 in)

Volleyball information
- Position: Outside Hitter
- Current club: Saitama Ageo Medics
- Number: 24

Career
- Years: Team
- 2012–2018 2018–2020 2020–2021 2021–2022 2022–: (Serbia) OK Vizura (Kazakhstan) VC Zhetysu (Kazakhstan) VC Altay (Russia) Proton-Saratov (Japan) Saitama Ageo Medics

National team
- Years: Team
- Serbia
Honours
World Championship
Gold medal – first place	2022 Netherlands/Poland	Team
FIVB Nations League
Bronze medal – third place	2022 Ankara	Team
European Championship
Silver medal – second place	2023 Belgium/Estonia/Germany/Italy	Team

Sara Lozo (Serbian Cyrillic: Сара Лозо; born 29 April 1997) is a Serbian professional volleyball player. She plays for the Serbia women's national volleyball team as an outside hitter. She is 1.86 m (6 ft 1 in) tall.

== Awards ==
=== National team ===
==== Junior team ====
- 2014 Junior European Championship – Gold Medal

==== Senior team ====
- 2022 Nations League – Bronze Medal
- 2022 World Championship – Gold Medal
- 2023 European Championship – Silver Medal

=== Clubs ===
- Serbian Volleyball League : 2013/14, 2014/15, 2015/16, 2016/17, 2017/18
- Serbian Cup : 2014/15, 2015/16
- Serbian Super Cup : 2013/14, 2014/15, 2015/16, 2016/17
- Kazakhstan League: 2019/20, 2020/21
- Kazakhstan Cup: 2020/21
- Kazakhstan Super Cup: 2018/19, 2019/20, 2020/21
- Asian Club championship : 2020/21

=== Individual awards ===
- 2014 Best server, European Championships U19 2014
- 2014/15 Best Outside Hitter, Serbian Superleauge
- 2015/16 Best Outside Hitter, Serbian Superleauge
- 2015/16 Best Outside Hitter, Serbian Cup
- 2015/16 Best server, Serbian Cup
- 2016/17 Best Outside Hitter, Serbian Superleauge
- 2017/18 Best server, Serbian Superleauge
- 2017/18 Best Outside Hitter, Serbian Superleauge
- 2018/19 Best receiver, Kazakhstan league
