= Zhetysu VC =

Volleyball club in Kazakhstan

- Full name: Zhetysu Volleyball Club
- Nickname: Zhetysu
- League: Kazakhstan National Liga
- 2024–25: 1

Championships
- 1 AVC Champions League; 9 Kazakhstan League

Zhetysu Volleyball Club (Russian: ВК Жетысу) is a volleyball club based in Taldykorgan. They organize both a men's and women's team.

The Zhetysu women's team is a nine-time Kazakhstan Women's Volleyball League with the most recent league title won in the 2024–25 season. They are also nine-time Kazakhstan Cup winners and four-time Super Cup winners.

Zhetysu has played in the AVC Women's Champions League (formerly the Asian Women's Club Volleyball Championship). They had played from 2008 to 2015 and in 2021.

The club won the 2025 AVC Women's Champions League title. Zhetysu also qualified for the 2025 FIVB Women's Volleyball Club World Championship by finishing as one of the two finalists of the Asian tournament.

== Current roster ==
The following is the roster of Zhetysu in the 2025 AVC Women's Champions League.

Head coach: (Serbia) Marko Gršić

No.	Player	Date of Birth	Height (m)	Position	Country
1	Perizat Nurbergenova	29 March 2004	1.80	Outside hitter	Kazakhstan
5	Karina Denisova (C)	28 December 1997	1.84	Outside hitter	Ukraine
7	Yuliya Dymar	3 December 1994	1.82	Outside hitter	Ukraine
9	Valeriya Yakutina	20 September 1994	1.89	Middle blocker	Kazakhstan
10	Irina Kenzhebaeva	20 February 1992	1.81	Outside hitter	Kazakhstan
11	Mariya Syrygina	14 November 1999	1.60	Libero	Kazakhstan
13	Kristina Belova	29 November 1998	1.84	Outside hitter	Kazakhstan
14	Daria Sharhorodska	11 April 2002	1.82	Setter	Ukraine
15	Madina Beket	6 November 1999	1.59	Libero	Kazakhstan
16	Tatyana Nikitina	15 January 2001	1.85	Opposite spiker	Kazakhstan
18	Kristina Anikonova	5 January 1991	1.85	Middle blocker	Kazakhstan
21	Alina Ashkhabekova	27 April 1998	1.74	Setter	Kazakhstan
23	Olga Khadzhioglo	23 April 2000	1.85	Middle blocker	Kazakhstan
27	Nataliya Borisenko	29 November 1999	1.86	Middle blocker	Kazakhstan

== Honours ==
=== International competitions ===
- AVC Women's Champions League
  - Winners (1): 2025
