= Stevan Ljubičić =

Serbian volleyball coach

Personal information
- Nationality: Serbian
- Born: August 29, 1980 (age 46); Užice, Serbia

Coaching information
- Current team: (Romania) CSM Volei Alba-Blaj
Previous teams coached
Years	Teams
2010–13; 2013–14; 2014–15; 2015–16; 2016–19; 2019–21; 2021–24; 2024– 2020–2024; 2025	OK Crnokosa Kosjerić (W); Jedinstvo Užice (W); OK Valjevo (W) (Lebanon) Baouchrieh (M) (Romania) CSM Volei Alba-Blaj (W) (Romania) Dinamo București (M, W) (Romania) CSM Volei Alba-Blaj (W) (Turkey) Zeren Spor (W) Bosnia and Herzegovina; Serbia (assistant coach)
Medal record
Head coach Bosnia and Herzegovina
European Silver League
Gold medal – first place	2021 Ruse

Stevan Ljubičić (Serbian Cyrillic: Стеван Љубичић; born 29 August 1980 in Užice) is a Serbian women's volleyball coach. He is the current head coach of Zeren Spor and former coach of the Bosnia and Herzegovina women's national volleyball team.

== Coaching career ==
Ljubičić took the position of head coach of the Bosnia and Herzegovina women's national volleyball team in 2020 and won European Silver League with the team following year. He also led national team to its first participation in European Championship 2021 and its first championship game victory in match against Azerbaijan. He qualified with national team for European Championship again in 2022. His term expired in 2024.

=== Clubs ===
CEV Champions League:

- 2018

CEV Cup:

- 2019, 2023
- 2019

Romanian league:

- 2017, 2019, 2022, 2023
- 2018, 2020

Romanian SuperCup:

- 2022
- 2017
- 2023

Romanian Cup:

- 2017, 2019, 2022
- 2018
- 2023, 2024

Romanian Cup (M):

- 2021

Serbian First League:

- 2012

Ahmet Goksu tournament:

- 1st place 2024
