= Esteghlal Ladies Volleyball Club =

Iranian volleyball club

Taj Ladies Volleyball Club
- Short name: Taj LVC

Uniforms
Home	Away

Taj Ladies Volleyball Club was a volleyball club, established in Tehran. Taj volleyball club was owned by Taj sports and cultural organization. Taj won Iranian Women's Volleyball League (Shahbanu cup) in 1976.

== History ==
Established in early 1960s Taj was one of the powerhouses of Iranian volleyball. In September 1963 Iran women's national volleyball team was formed and played their first friendly match against Japan. Most of the players of Iran national team were members of Taj and Taj played a vital rule in forming Iranian national volleyball team.

== Honours ==
=== National ===
- Shahbanu Cup

Champions (1): 1975

=== Regional ===
- Tehran Clubs Championship

Champions (3): 1962, 1971, 1983
Runners-up (1[3]): 1973
Third place (1): 1975

== Gallery ==
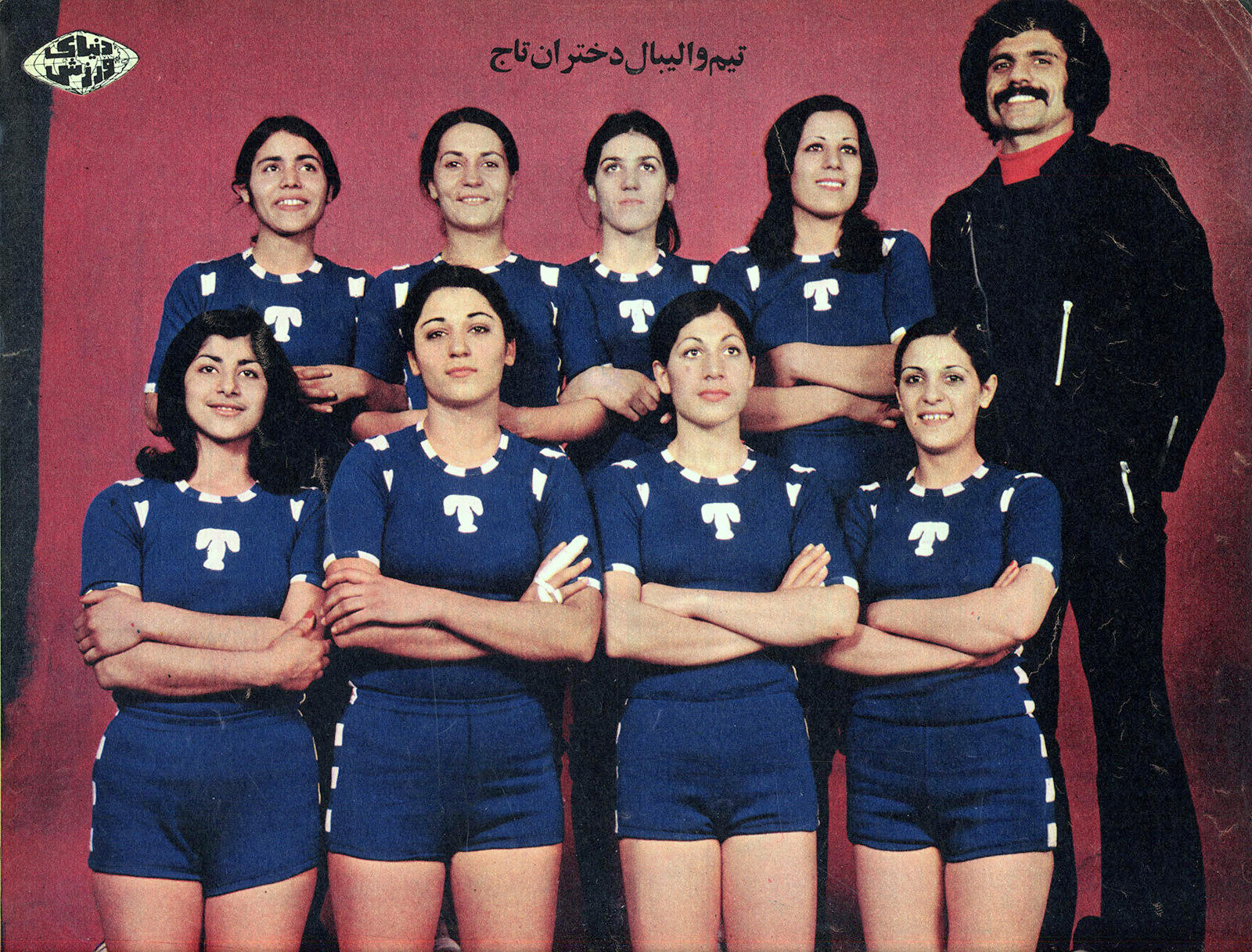
Taj squad in early 1970s

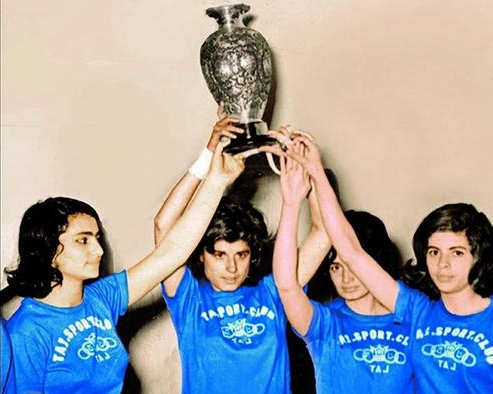
The Tehran Club Women's Volleyball Championship in 1962 was won by Ashraf Vahidian, captain of Taj Club, and her teammates.

Iranian Women's Volleyball League

== See also ==
- List of Esteghlal F.C. records and statistics
- List of Esteghlal F.C. honours

== Bibliography ==
- Ahmadi, Seyyed Ali Akbar (21 December 2009). Esteghlal Full History of the Club from Docharkheh Savaran and Taj to Esteghlal. Paygan. ISBN 978-600-5096-54-5.
