= 2021 Asian Women's Club Volleyball Championship =

Tournament details
- Host country: Thailand
- Dates: 1–7 October
- Teams: 7
- Venue: 1 (in 1 host city)

Final positions
- Champions: (Kazakhstan) Altay (1st title)
- Runners-up: (Thailand) Nakhon Ratchasima QminC
- Third place: (Thailand) Supreme Chonburi
- Fourth place: (Iran) Saipa Tehran

Tournament awards
- MVP: (Kazakhstan) Sana Anarkulova (Altay)
- Best Setter: (Thailand) Nootsara Tomkom (Nakhon Ratchasima QminC)
- Best OH: (Ukraine) Nadiia Kodola (Altay) (Thailand) Chatchu-on Moksri (Nakhon Ratchasima QminC)
- Best MB: (Thailand) Pleumjit Thinkaow (Supreme Chonburi) (Iran) Pouran Zare (Saipa Tehran)
- Best OPP: (Kazakhstan) Kristina Belova (Altay)
- Best Libero: (Kazakhstan) Madina Beket (Altay)

The 2021 Asian Women's Club Volleyball Championship was the 21st edition of the Asian Women's Club Volleyball Championship, an annual international volleyball club tournament organized by the Asian Volleyball Confederation (AVC) with Thailand Volleyball Association (TVA). The tournament was held in Nakhon Ratchasima, Thailand, from 1 to 7 October 2021. The winner of the tournament qualified to 2021 FIVB Volleyball Women's Club World Championship.

The last edition of the tournament was held in 2019. The 2020 edition, due to be hosted in Tianjin, China. The hosting duties was moved to Thailand before the tournament was cancelled due to the COVID-19 pandemic.

== Qualification ==
Following the AVC regulations, the maximum of 16 teams in all AVC events will be selected by:

- 1 team for the host country
- 10 teams based on the final standing of the previous edition
- 5 teams from each of 5 zones (with a qualification tournament if needed)

Due to anticipated difficulty for national federations to field teams due to the COVID-19 pandemic, the AVC allowed two clubs from the same national federation to participate in the case that there are less than 8 federations enter the tournament. In the case of less than 16 entrants, the host is entitled to enter two teams. Only four national federations entered with Iran the only country to have one representative club.

=== Qualified associations ===
Event(s)	Dates	Location	Berths	Qualifier(s)
Host country	—N/a	—N/a	1	(Thailand) Thailand^{A}
2019 Asian Championship	27 April–5 May 2019	(China) Tianjin	2	~~China~~^{B} (Thailand) Thailand^{A} ~~Japan~~^{B} Kazakhstan; ~~North Korea~~^{B} ~~Chinese Taipei~~^{B} ~~Vietnam~~^{B} ~~Hong Kong~~^{B} ~~Sri Lanka~~^{B} ~~Turkmenistan~~^{B}
CAZVA representatives	No later than 2 February 2021	(Thailand) Bangkok	1	Iran
SEAZVA representatives	No later than 2 February 2021	(Thailand) Bangkok	1	Philippines
Extra slots^{C}	No later than 2 February 2021	(Thailand) Bangkok	2	Kazakhstan; Philippines
Total			7	

^A Thailand as host country is entitled to enter two teams if they are less than 16 entrants. Their two berths are credited to have been attained as host nation and second placers in the 2019 championships.
^B Under tournament regulations the top ten associations are reserved a berth. Only two from the ten participating associations in the 2019 championship elected to enter a team.
^C National federations other than the host are entitled to send two teams if there are less than 8 entrants. Philippines and Kazakhstan, who also qualified a berth as the fourth-best finishing team in the 2019 edition, elected to send two teams.

== Squads ==
=== Participating teams ===
The following teams were entered for the tournament.

Association	Team	Domestic league standing
Thailand	Nakhon Ratchasima	2020–21 Women's Volleyball Thailand League runner-up
Thailand	Supreme Chonburi	2020–21 Women's Volleyball Thailand League third placers
Kazakhstan	Altay	
Kazakhstan	Zhetysu	
Philippines	Rebisco^{D}	N/A (National team)
Philippines	Choco Mucho^{E}	N/A (Developmental national team)
Iran	Saipa Tehran	

^D The PNVF fielded the Philippine national team as a club under the Rebisco name.
^E The identity of the team is not known at the time of the draw and was listed as "PVL". The PNVF has invited the Premier Volleyball League to send its best finishing team in the 2021 Open Conference but all teams declined to enter. The PNVF will field a second team composing of national team players instead. The second team was named Team Choco Mucho.

== Draw ==
The draw was held on 3 August 2021 in Bangkok, Thailand.

== Venues ==
Matches will be held at the Terminal Hall – Terminal 21 Korat, an indoor arena within the Terminal 21

All Matches
Nakhon Ratchasima, Thailand
Terminal 21 Korat
Capacity: 3,500

== Preliminary round ==
- All times are Indochina Time (UTC+07:00).

=== Pool A ===
Pos	Team	Pld	W	L	Pts	SW	SL	SR	SPW	SPL	SPR	Qualification
1	(Thailand) Nakhon Ratchasima QminC	2	2	0	5	6	2	3.000	178	153	1.163	Quarterfinals
2	(Kazakhstan) Zhetysu	2	1	1	4	5	3	1.667	174	156	1.115	Quarterfinals
3	(Philippines) Choco Mucho	2	0	2	0	0	6	0.000	110	151	0.728	Quarterfinals

Date	Time		Score		Set 1	Set 2	Set 3	Set 4	Set 5	Total	Report
1 Oct	12:30	Nakhon Ratchasima QminC (Thailand)	3–0	(Philippines) Choco Mucho	25–11	28–26	25–17			78–54	P2
2 Oct	12:30	Zhetysu (Kazakhstan)	3–0	(Philippines) Choco Mucho	25–22	25–19	25–15			75–56	P2
3 Oct	12:30	Nakhon Ratchasima QminC (Thailand)	3–2	(Kazakhstan) Zhetysu	25–20	18–25	25–19	17–25	15–10	100–99	P2

=== Pool B ===
Pos	Team	Pld	W	L	Pts	SW	SL	SR	SPW	SPL	SPR	Qualification
1	(Kazakhstan) Altay	3	3	0	9	9	0	MAX	225	148	1.520	Semifinals
2	(Thailand) Supreme Chonburi	3	2	1	6	6	4	1.500	221	192	1.151	Quarterfinals
3	(Iran) Saipa Tehran	3	1	2	3	4	7	0.571	218	251	0.869	Quarterfinals
4	(Philippines) Rebisco PH	3	0	3	0	1	9	0.111	175	248	0.706	Quarterfinals

Date	Time		Score		Set 1	Set 2	Set 3	Set 4	Set 5	Total	Report
1 Oct	15:30	Supreme Chonburi (Thailand)	3–1	(Iran) Saipa Tehran	25–23	22–25	25–13	25–13		97–74	P2
1 Oct	18:30	Altay (Kazakhstan)	3–0	(Philippines) Rebisco PH	25–23	25–13	25–17			75–53	P2
2 Oct	15:30	Supreme Chonburi (Thailand)	3–0	(Philippines) Rebisco PH	25–11	25–16	25–16			75–43	P2
2 Oct	18:30	Saipa Tehran (Iran)	0–3	(Kazakhstan) Altay	11–25	20–25	15–25			46–75	P2
3 Oct	15:30	Altay (Kazakhstan)	3–0	(Thailand) Supreme Chonburi	25–23	25–12	25–14			75–49	P2
3 Oct	18:30	Saipa Tehran (Iran)	3–1	(Philippines) Rebisco PH	26–24	22–25	25–13	25–17		98–79	P2

== Final round ==
- All times are Indochina Time (UTC+07:00).

Quarterfinals
4 October
(Thailand) Nakhon Ratchasima QminC	3
(Philippines) Rebisco PH	0
4 October
(Philippines) Choco Mucho	0
(Thailand) Supreme Chonburi	3
4 October
(Kazakhstan) Zhetysu	0
(Iran) Saipa Tehran	3
4 October
bye
(Kazakhstan) Altay	W

Semifinals
6 October
(Thailand) Nakhon Ratchasima QminC	3
(Thailand) Supreme Chonburi	0
6 October
(Iran) Saipa Tehran	1
(Kazakhstan) Altay	3

Final
7 October
(Thailand) Nakhon Ratchasima QminC	0
(Kazakhstan) Altay	3
3rd place match
7 October
(Thailand) Supreme Chonburi	3
(Iran) Saipa Tehran	0

5th–7th semifinals
6 October
(Philippines) Rebisco PH	1
(Philippines) Choco Mucho	3
6 October
(Kazakhstan) Zhetysu	W
bye

5th place match
7 October
(Philippines) Choco Mucho	0
(Kazakhstan) Zhetysu	3
7th place match
7 October
(Philippines) Rebisco PH	W
bye

=== Quarterfinals ===
Date	Time		Score		Set 1	Set 2	Set 3	Set 4	Set 5	Total	Report
4 Oct	12:30	Nakhon Ratchasima QminC (Thailand)	3–0	(Philippines) Rebisco PH	25–11	25–19	25–18			75–48	P2
4 Oct	15:30	Choco Mucho (Philippines)	0–3	(Thailand) Supreme Chonburi	13–25	22–25	21–25			56–75	P2
4 Oct	18:00	Zhetysu (Kazakhstan)	0–3	(Iran) Saipa Tehran	21–25	21–25	23–25			65–75	P2

=== 5th–7th semifinals ===
Date	Time		Score		Set 1	Set 2	Set 3	Set 4	Set 5	Total	Report
6 Oct	12:30	Rebisco PH (Philippines)	1–3	(Philippines) Choco Mucho	25–22	17–25	19–25	17–25		78–97	P2

=== Semifinals ===
Date	Time		Score		Set 1	Set 2	Set 3	Set 4	Set 5	Total	Report
6 Oct	15:30	Saipa Tehran (Iran)	1–3	(Kazakhstan) Altay	20–25	25–21	15–25	22–25		82–96	P2
6 Oct	18:30	Nakhon Ratchasima QminC (Thailand)	3–0	(Thailand) Supreme Chonburi	25–18	25–22	25–18			75–58	P2

=== 5th place match ===
Date	Time		Score		Set 1	Set 2	Set 3	Set 4	Set 5	Total	Report
7 Oct	12:30	Zhetysu (Kazakhstan)	3–0	(Philippines) Choco Mucho	25–14	25–11	25–23			75–48	P2

=== 3rd place match ===
Date	Time		Score		Set 1	Set 2	Set 3	Set 4	Set 5	Total	Report
7 Oct	15:30	Supreme Chonburi (Thailand)	3–0	(Iran) Saipa Tehran	25–21	25–18	25–19			75–58	P2

=== Final ===
Date	Time		Score		Set 1	Set 2	Set 3	Set 4	Set 5	Total	Report
7 Oct	18:30	Nakhon Ratchasima QminC (Thailand)	0–3	(Kazakhstan) Altay	22–25	22–25	20–25			64–75	P2

== Final standing ==
Rank	Team
1st place, gold medalist(s)	(Kazakhstan) Altay
2nd place, silver medalist(s)	(Thailand) Nakhon Ratchasima QminC
3rd place, bronze medalist(s)	(Thailand) Supreme Chonburi
4	(Iran) Saipa Tehran
5	(Kazakhstan) Zhetysu
6	(Philippines) Choco Mucho
7	(Philippines) Rebisco PH

Qualified for the 2021 FIVB Volleyball Women's Club World Championship

2021 Asian Women's Club Champions

1st title

14-Women roster
Sana Anarkulova, Kristina Anikonova, Madina Beket, Kristina Belova, Lyudmila Issayeva, Zinat Kadyrbekova, Irina Kenzhebayeva, Yelizaveta Meister, Zhannel Nogaibayeva, Zarina Sitkazinova, Zhanna Syroyeshkina, Polina Ufimtseva, Danica Radenković, Nadiia Kodola
Head coach
(Serbia) Marko Grsic

== Awards ==
- Most Valuable Player

Sana Anarkulova (KAZ) (Altay)

- Best Setter

Nootsara Tomkom (THA) (Nakhon Ratchasima QminC)

- Best Outside Spikers

Nadiia Kodola (UKR) (Altay)
Chatchu-on Moksri (THA) (Nakhon Ratchasima QminC)

- Best Middle Blockers

Pleumjit Thinkaow (THA) (Supreme Chonburi)
Pouran Zare (IRI) (Saipa Tehran)

- Best Opposite Spiker

Kristina Belova (KAZ) (Altay)

- Best Libero

Madina Beket (KAZ) (Altay)

== See also ==
- 2021 Asian Men's Club Volleyball Championship
- 2021 Asian Women's Volleyball Championship
