= Saipa Tehran VC (women) =

Saipa
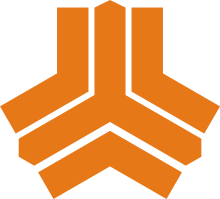
- Full name: Saipa Tehran Volleyball Club
- Short name: Saipa
- Ground: Tehran
- League: Iranian League
- 2024–25: 1st
- Website: Club home page

Uniforms
Home	Away

Saipa Tehran Volleyball Club (Persian: باشگاه والیبال سایپا تهران, Bâshgâh-e Vâlibâl-e Sâipâ-ye Tehrân) is an Iranian professional volleyball team based in Tehran, Iran. They compete in the Iranian Women's Volleyball League. The team is owned by SAIPA, an Iranian automobile manufacturer. Saipa VC is the volleyball club of the multisport Saipa Cultural and Athletic Corporation which also maintains a men's side.

Saipa is a three-time Iranian volleyball champion having won the 2020–21, 2023–24, and 2024–25 seasons of the Iranian Women's Volleyball League.

They have taken part in the AVC Women's Champions League (previously the Asian Women's Club Volleyball Championship). Their best finish was fourth place in the 2021 edition. They also played in the 2024 edition.

== Honors ==
- Iranian League

Champions (3): 2020–21, 2023–24, 2024–25
Runners-up (3): 2007–08, 2008–09, 2021–22
Third place (1): 2022–23
