= Bosnia and Herzegovina women's national volleyball team =

National sports team

Bosnia and Herzegovina
- Association: Volleyball Federation of Bosnia and Herzegovina
- Confederation: CEV
- Head coach: Stevan Ljubičić
- FIVB ranking: 47 ▼5 (2 October 2026)

Uniforms
Home

European Championship
- Appearances: 2 (First in 2021)
- Best result: 19th place (2021)
- OSBIH.ba (in Bosnian)

The Bosnia and Herzegovina women's national volleyball team represents Bosnia and Herzegovina in international women's volleyball competitions and friendly matches.

== Tournament record ==
=== World Championship ===
World Championship record										World Championship qualification record				
Year	Round	Position	Pld	W	L	SW	SL	Squad		Pld	W	L	SW	SL
(Japan) 2006	did not qualify									4	0	4	2	12
(Japan) 2010	did not qualify									3	1	2	3	6
(Italy) 2014	did not qualify									3	1	2	4	8
(Japan) 2018	did not qualify									5	1	4	7	13
(Netherlands) / (Poland) 2022	did not qualify													
(Thailand) 2025	did not qualify													
(Canada) (United States) 2027	To be determined									To be determined				
(Philippines) 2029	To be determined									To be determined				
Total	Qualified: 0/8			0	0	0	0	0	—	15	3	12	16	39

=== European Championship ===
European Championship record										European Championship qualification record				
Year	Round	Position	Pld	W	L	SW	SL	Squad		Pld	W	L	SW	SL
(Belgium) / (Luxembourg) 2007	did not qualify									6	0	6	1	18
(Poland) 2009	did not qualify									6	2	4	6	13
(Italy) / (Serbia) 2011	did not qualify									?	?	?	?	?
(Germany) / (Switzerland) 2013	did not participate									—				
(Netherlands) / (Belgium) 2015	did not qualify									9	2	7	14	24
(Azerbaijan) / (Georgia (country)) 2017	did not qualify									9	3	6	10	22
(Slovakia) / (Hungary) / (Poland) / (Turkey) 2019	did not qualify									6	3	3	12	11
(Serbia) / (Bulgaria) / (Croatia) / (Romania) 2021	Preliminary round	19th	5	1	4	3	12	Squad		6	3	3	11	9
(Belgium) / (Italy) / (Estonia) / (Germany) 2023	Preliminary round	18th	5	2	3	9	13	Squad		6	5	1	15	5
(Azerbaijan) / (Czech Republic) / (Sweden) / (Turkey) 2026	did not qualify									4	1	3	3	11
(Spain) 2028	To be determined									To be determined				
Total	Qualified: 2/10		10	3	7	12	25		—	48	18	30	69	102

== Past rosters ==
2021 European Championship: finished 19th among 24 teams

1 Ajla Paradžik, 2 Žana Dragutinović, 3 Milana Božić, 4 Ajla Hadžić, 5 Tamara Đapa, 6 Ivana Radović, 7 Anđelka Radišković, 9 Edina Begić, 10 Ela Klopić, 11 Edina Selimović, 12 Milica Ivković, 15 Dženita Rašidović, 16 Elena Babić, 17 Dajana Bošković (Coach: (Serbia) Stevan Ljubičić)

2023 European Championship: finished 18th among 24 teams

1 Ajla Paradžik, 2 Ana Zekić, 3 Milana Božić, 4 Dora Brašnić, 5 Iman Isanović, 7 Anđelka Radišković, 9 Edina Begić, 10 Maja Lasić, 11 Edina Selimović, 12 Milica Ivković, 13 Jovana Biberdžić, 17 Dajana Bošković, 18 Dragana Stevanović, 22 Nina Dukić (Coach: (Serbia) Stevan Ljubičić)
