= 2013 European Youth Olympic Festival =

2013 European Youth Olympic Festival may refer to:

- 2013 European Youth Summer Olympic Festival
- 2013 European Youth Winter Olympic Festival
