= 2021 Women's European Volleyball Championship =

Tournament details
- Host country: Serbia; Bulgaria; Croatia; Romania
- Dates: 18 August–4 September
- Teams: 24

Final positions
- Champions: Italy (3rd title)

Tournament awards
- MVP: (Italy) Paola Egonu

The 2021 Women's European Volleyball Championship was the 32nd edition of the Women's European Volleyball Championship, organised by Europe's governing volleyball body, the CEV. For the second time the Women's EuroVolley was held in four countries: Serbia, Bulgaria, Croatia and Romania.

== Qualification ==
Means of qualification	Qualifier	Means of qualification		Qualifier
Host Countries	Serbia	Qualification	Pool A	Belarus
Host Countries	Bulgaria	Qualification	Pool A	Switzerland
Host Countries	Croatia	Qualification	Pool B	Sweden
Host Countries	Romania	Qualification	Pool B	Ukraine
2019 European Championship	Turkey	Qualification	Pool C	Greece
2019 European Championship	Italy	Qualification	Pool C	Spain
2019 European Championship	Poland	Qualification	Pool D	Slovakia
2019 European Championship	Netherlands	Qualification	Pool D	Finland
2019 European Championship	Germany	Qualification	Pool E	France
2019 European Championship	Russia	Qualification	Pool E	Hungary
2019 European Championship	Belgium	Qualification	Pool F	Czech Republic
2019 European Championship	Azerbaijan	Qualification	Pool F	Bosnia and Herzegovina
Total 24

== Pools composition ==
The drawing of lots was combined with a seeding of National Federations and performed as follows:

1. The 4 organizers were seeded in Preliminary pools. Serbia in Pool A, Bulgaria in Pool B, Croatia in Pool C and Romania in Pool D.
2. The first and second best ranked from the previous edition of the CEV competition were drawn in different Preliminary pools, which meant that Serbia could not be paired with Turkey.
3. The organizers could select one team to join their pools, as a result, Azerbaijan joined Serbia in Pool A, Poland joined Bulgaria in Pool B, Italy joined Croatia in Pool C and Turkey joined Romania in Pool D.
4. According to the CEV National Team ranking list (as per 01/01/2020), the 16 remaining teams were seeded by descending order in a number of cups that equals the number of Preliminary pools.

Pot 1	Pot 2	Pot 3	Pot 4
Netherlands; Russia; Germany; Belarus	Belgium; Ukraine; Spain; Slovakia	Hungary; Czech Republic; France; Finland	Greece; Switzerland; Bosnia and Herzegovina; Sweden

Draw

The drawing of lots was held on 20 May 2021 in Belgrade, Serbia.

Pool A	Pool B	Pool C	Pool D
Serbia	Bulgaria	Croatia	Romania
Azerbaijan	Poland	Italy	Turkey
Russia	Germany	Belarus	Netherlands
Belgium	Spain	Slovakia	Ukraine
France	Czech Republic	Hungary	Finland
Bosnia and Herzegovina	Greece	Switzerland	Sweden

== Venues ==
Pool A, All knockout rounds		Pool B, Round of 16, Quarterfinals	
Belgrade, Serbia	Belgrade is located in Serbia	Plovdiv, Bulgaria	Plovdiv is located in Bulgaria
Štark Arena	Belgrade is located in Serbia	Kolodruma	Plovdiv is located in Bulgaria
Capacity: 18,386	Belgrade is located in Serbia	Capacity: 6,100	Plovdiv is located in Bulgaria
Pool C		Pool D	
Zadar, Croatia	Zadar is located in Croatia	Cluj-Napoca, Romania	Cluj-Napoca is located in Romania
Krešimir Ćosić Hall	Zadar is located in Croatia	BTarena	Cluj-Napoca is located in Romania
Capacity: 8,500	Zadar is located in Croatia	Capacity: 10,000	Cluj-Napoca is located in Romania

== Pool standing procedure ==
1. Number of matches won
2. Match points
3. Sets ratio
4. Points ratio
5. If the tie continues as per the point ratio between two teams, the priority will be given to the team which won the match between them. When the tie in points ratio is between three or more teams, a new classification of these teams in the terms of points 1, 2, 3 and 4 will be made taking into consideration only the matches in which they were opposed to each other.

Match won 3–0 or 3–1: 3 match points for the winner, 0 match points for the loser
Match won 3–2: 2 match points for the winner, 1 match point for the loser

== Preliminary round ==
- The top four teams in each pool will qualify for the final round.

=== Pool A ===
Pos	Team	Pld	W	L	Pts	SW	SL	SR	SPW	SPL	SPR	Qualification
1	Serbia	5	5	0	14	15	2	7.500	405	307	1.319	Final round
2	Russia	5	3	2	11	13	7	1.857	443	399	1.110	Final round
3	France	5	3	2	9	10	8	1.250	392	386	1.016	Final round
4	Belgium	5	3	2	8	10	8	1.250	418	374	1.118	Final round
5	Bosnia and Herzegovina	5	1	4	3	3	12	0.250	283	355	0.797	
6	Azerbaijan	5	0	5	0	1	15	0.067	282	402	0.701	

Source: CEV
- All times are Central European Summer Time (UTC+02:00).

Date	Time		Score		Set 1	Set 2	Set 3	Set 4	Set 5	Total	Report
19 Aug	17:00	Serbia	3–0	Bosnia and Herzegovina	25–11	25–18	25–14			75–43	Report
20 Aug	17:00	Azerbaijan	0–3	Belgium	13–25	24–26	13–25			50–76	Report
20 Aug	20:00	Russia	3–1	France	25–19	14–25	25–20	25–18		89–82	Report
21 Aug	18:00	Azerbaijan	0–3	Bosnia and Herzegovina	14–25	23–25	17–25			54–75	Report
21 Aug	21:00	France	0–3	Serbia	14–25	13–25	16–25			43–75	Report
22 Aug	17:00	Russia	3–0	Azerbaijan	25–16	25–17	25–13			75–46	Report
22 Aug	20:00	Serbia	3–0	Belgium	25–21	25–21	25–21			75–63	Report
23 Aug	17:00	Belgium	3–2	Russia	29–31	21–25	25–13	25–22	15–11	115–102	Report
23 Aug	20:00	Bosnia and Herzegovina	0–3	France	19–25	14–25	24–26			57–76	Report
24 Aug	17:00	Bosnia and Herzegovina	0–3	Belgium	23–25	19–25	15–25			57–75	Report
24 Aug	20:00	Azerbaijan	0–3	Serbia	17–25	20–25	19–25			56–75	Report
25 Aug	17:00	France	3–1	Azerbaijan	25–19	26–28	25–11	25–18		101–76	Report
25 Aug	20:00	Serbia	3–2	Russia	25–22	25–19	16–25	24–26	15–10	105–102	Report
26 Aug	17:00	Russia	3–0	Bosnia and Herzegovina	25–12	25–20	25–19			75–51	Report
26 Aug	20:00	Belgium	1–3	France	25–27	25–13	19–25	20–25		89–90	Report

=== Pool B ===
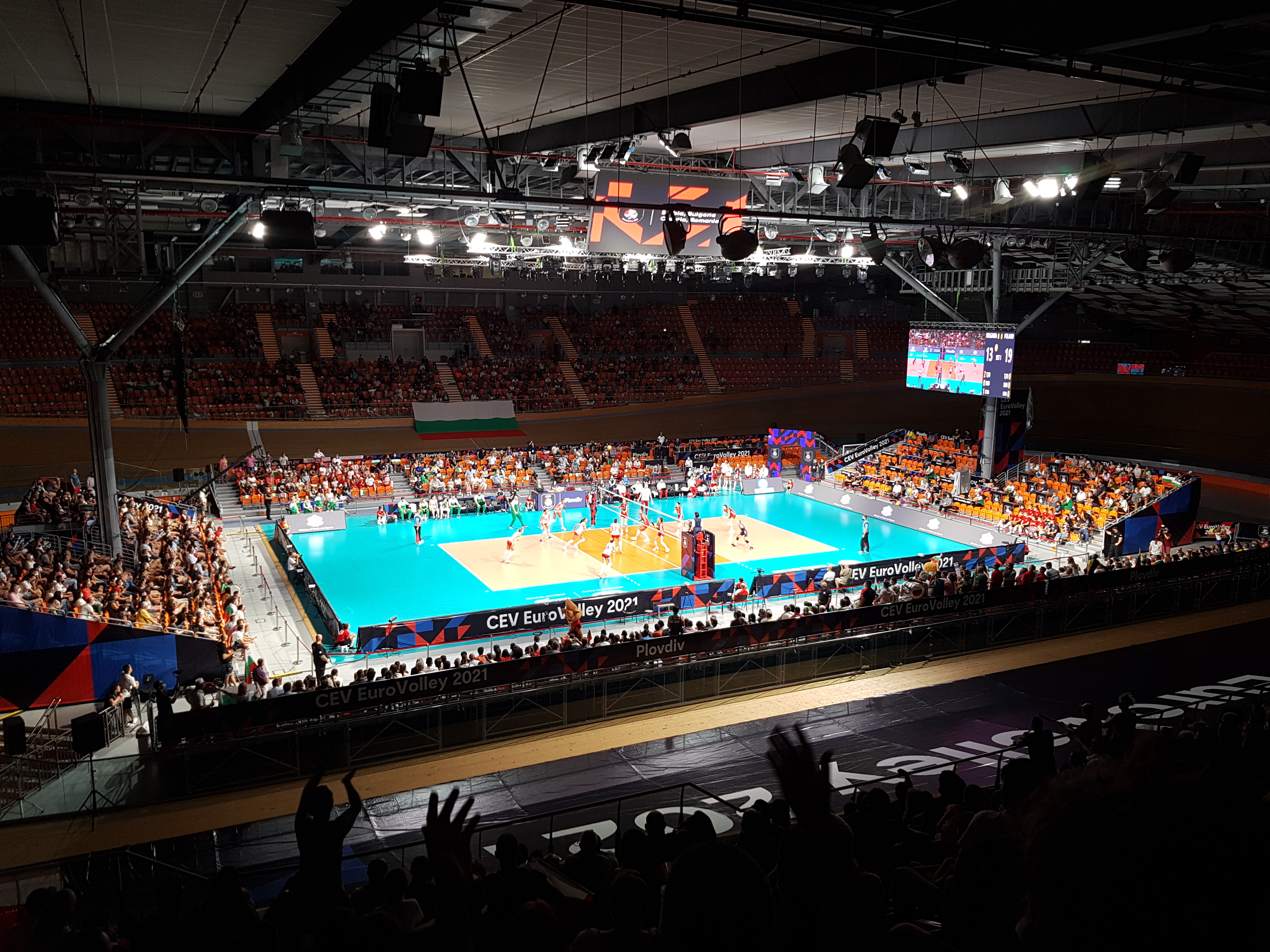
Bulgaria vs. Poland

Pos	Team	Pld	W	L	Pts	SW	SL	SR	SPW	SPL	SPR	Qualification
1	Bulgaria	5	4	1	13	14	4	3.500	423	350	1.209	Final round
2	Poland	5	4	1	12	13	5	2.600	433	355	1.220	Final round
3	Germany	5	4	1	11	13	6	2.167	434	404	1.074	Final round
4	Czech Republic	5	2	3	6	8	10	0.800	402	418	0.962	Final round
5	Spain	5	1	4	2	4	14	0.286	339	424	0.800	
6	Greece	5	0	5	1	2	15	0.133	335	415	0.807	

Source: CEV
- All times are Eastern European Summer Time (UTC+03:00).

Date	Time		Score		Set 1	Set 2	Set 3	Set 4	Set 5	Total	Report
18 Aug	20:30	Bulgaria	3–0	Greece	25–20	25–15	25–19			75–54	Report
19 Aug	17:30	Spain	1–3	Czech Republic	25–22	20–25	22–25	20–25		87–97	Report
19 Aug	20:30	Germany	1–3	Poland	22–25	25–23	21–25	22–25		90–98	Report
20 Aug	17:30	Czech Republic	1–3	Germany	23–25	25–20	23–25	21–25		92–95	Report
20 Aug	20:30	Greece	0–3	Poland	16–25	20–25	19–25			55–75	Report
21 Aug	17:30	Czech Republic	1–3	Poland	25–20	15–25	21–25	18–25		79–95	Report
21 Aug	20:30	Bulgaria	3–0	Spain	25–12	25–19	25–21			75–52	Report
22 Aug	16:00	Greece	2–3	Spain	22–25	26–24	16–25	25–22	13–15	102–111	Report
22 Aug	19:00	Germany	3–2	Bulgaria	25–23	16–25	25–21	18–25	15–10	99–104	Report
23 Aug	17:30	Greece	0–3	Czech Republic	24–26	26–28	15–25			65–79	Report
23 Aug	20:30	Poland	3–0	Spain	25–15	25–15	25–8			75–38	Report
24 Aug	17:30	Germany	3–0	Greece	25–20	25–17	25–22			75–59	Report
24 Aug	20:30	Bulgaria	3–0	Czech Republic	26–24	25–12	25–19			76–55	Report
25 Aug	17:30	Spain	0–3	Germany	13–25	17–25	21–25			51–75	Report
25 Aug	20:30	Bulgaria	3–1	Poland	18–25	25–21	25–21	25–23		93–90	Report

=== Pool C ===
Pos	Team	Pld	W	L	Pts	SW	SL	SR	SPW	SPL	SPR	Qualification
1	Italy	5	5	0	15	15	1	15.000	402	297	1.354	Final round
2	Croatia	5	4	1	12	12	4	3.000	373	322	1.158	Final round
3	Belarus	5	3	2	7	9	10	0.900	396	417	0.950	Final round
4	Hungary	5	1	4	5	8	13	0.615	439	470	0.934	Final round
5	Slovakia	5	1	4	4	7	13	0.538	424	461	0.920	
6	Switzerland	5	1	4	2	4	14	0.286	367	434	0.846	

Source: CEV
- All times are Central European Summer Time (UTC+02:00).

Date	Time		Score		Set 1	Set 2	Set 3	Set 4	Set 5	Total	Report
19 Aug	17:00	Croatia	3–0	Switzerland	25–20	25–19	25–21			75–60	Report
20 Aug	17:15	Italy	3–0	Belarus	25–20	25–18	25–16			75–54	Report
20 Aug	20:15	Hungary	3–1	Slovakia	25–20	25–23	20–25	25–18		95–86	Report
21 Aug	17:00	Belarus	0–3	Croatia	19–25	23–25	15–25			57–75	Report
21 Aug	20:00	Hungary	2–3	Switzerland	25–22	23–25	27–29	25–23	11–15	111–114	Report
22 Aug	17:00	Croatia	3–0	Slovakia	25–21	25–14	25–13			75–48	Report
22 Aug	20:00	Italy	3–0	Hungary	25–16	25–15	25–19			75–50	Report
23 Aug	17:15	Slovakia	1–3	Italy	19–25	18–25	27–25	17–25		81–100	Report
23 Aug	20:15	Switzerland	0–3	Belarus	23–25	15–25	15–25			53–75	Report
24 Aug	17:00	Hungary	1–3	Croatia	19–25	25–21	17–25	21–25		82–96	Report
24 Aug	20:00	Switzerland	1–3	Slovakia	25–21	14–25	19–25	22–25		80–96	Report
25 Aug	18:00	Belarus	3–2	Hungary	20–25	14–25	25–16	25–23	15–12	99–101	Report
25 Aug	21:00	Croatia	0–3	Italy	15–25	23–25	14–25			52–75	Report
26 Aug	17:00	Slovakia	2–3	Belarus	25–18	25–23	23–25	28–30	12–15	113–111	Report
26 Aug	20:00	Italy	3–0	Switzerland	25–17	25–18	27–25			77–60	Report

=== Pool D ===
Pos	Team	Pld	W	L	Pts	SW	SL	SR	SPW	SPL	SPR	Qualification
1	Turkey	5	5	0	15	15	1	15.000	405	298	1.359	Final round
2	Netherlands	5	4	1	12	12	4	3.000	387	288	1.344	Final round
3	Ukraine	5	3	2	9	9	7	1.286	359	346	1.038	Final round
4	Sweden	5	2	3	5	6	11	0.545	358	393	0.911	Final round
5	Finland	5	1	4	4	6	13	0.462	377	450	0.838	
6	Romania	5	0	5	0	3	15	0.200	330	441	0.748	

Source: CEV
- All times are Eastern European Summer Time (UTC+03:00).

Date	Time		Score		Set 1	Set 2	Set 3	Set 4	Set 5	Total	Report
18 Aug	20:30	Romania	1–3	Turkey	25–23	10–25	20–25	17–25		72–98	Report
19 Aug	16:00	Sweden	3–2	Finland	24–26	17–25	25–19	27–25	15–13	108–108	Report
19 Aug	19:00	Netherlands	3–0	Ukraine	25–17	25–12	25–22			75–51	Report
20 Aug	17:30	Finland	0–3	Netherlands	10–25	10–25	18–25			38–75	Report
20 Aug	20:30	Turkey	3–0	Ukraine	25–14	25–19	26–24			76–57	Report
21 Aug	17:30	Finland	1–3	Ukraine	19–25	23–25	28–26	22–25		92–101	Report
21 Aug	20:30	Romania	0–3	Sweden	21–25	17–25	16–25			54–75	Report
22 Aug	17:30	Turkey	3–0	Sweden	31–29	25–21	25–11			81–61	Report
22 Aug	20:30	Netherlands	3–1	Romania	25–12	25–27	25–17	25–14		100–70	Report
23 Aug	17:30	Ukraine	3–0	Sweden	25–23	25–17	25–20			75–60	Report
23 Aug	20:30	Turkey	3–0	Finland	25–19	25–12	25–15			75–46	Report
24 Aug	17:30	Netherlands	0–3	Turkey	21–25	21–25	20–25			62–75	Report
24 Aug	20:30	Romania	1–3	Finland	25–18	22–25	22–25	22–25		91–93	Report
25 Aug	17:30	Sweden	0–3	Netherlands	21–25	20–25	13–25			54–75	Report
25 Aug	20:30	Romania	0–3	Ukraine	15–25	17–25	11–25			43–75	Report

== Final round ==
Round of 16
29 August–Plovdiv
Turkey	3
Czech Republic	1
29 August–Plovdiv
Poland	3
Ukraine	1
29 August–Belgrade
Serbia	3
Hungary	0
29 August–Belgrade
Croatia	2
France	3
28 August–Plovdiv
Bulgaria	2
Sweden	3
28 August–Plovdiv
Netherlands	3
Germany	1
30 August–Belgrade
Italy	3
Belgium	1
30 August–Belgrade
Russia	3
Belarus	1

Quarterfinals
31 August–Plovdiv
Turkey	3
Poland	0
1 September–Belgrade
Serbia	3
France	1
31 August–Plovdiv
Sweden	0
Netherlands	3
1 September–Belgrade
Italy	3
Russia	0

Semifinals
3 September–Belgrade
Turkey	1
Serbia	3
3 September–Belgrade
Netherlands	1
Italy	3

Final
4 September–Belgrade
Serbia	1
Italy	3
3rd place match
4 September–Belgrade
Turkey	3
Netherlands	0

- All times in Belgrade are Central European Summer Time (UTC+02:00).
- All times in Plovdiv are Eastern European Summer Time (UTC+03:00).

=== Round of 16 ===
Date	Time		Score		Set 1	Set 2	Set 3	Set 4	Set 5	Total	Report
28 Aug	17:30	Netherlands	3–1	Germany	25–22	23–25	25–19	25–23		98–89	Report
28 Aug	20:30	Bulgaria	2–3	Sweden	25–12	21–25	22–25	25–14	17–19	110–95	Report
29 Aug	17:30	Turkey	3–1	Czech Republic	25–13	22–25	25–14	25–13		97–65	Report
29 Aug	17:00	Croatia	2–3	France	25–16	21–25	25–22	22–25	12–15	105–103	Report
29 Aug	20:30	Poland	3–1	Ukraine	21–25	25–21	25–22	25–17		96–85	Report
29 Aug	20:00	Serbia	3–0	Hungary	25–20	25–19	25–17			75–56	Report
30 Aug	17:00	Italy	3–1	Belgium	25–14	23–25	25–17	25–12		98–68	Report
30 Aug	20:00	Russia	3–1	Belarus	27–25	25–20	19–25	25–23		96–93	Report

=== Quarterfinals ===
Date	Time		Score		Set 1	Set 2	Set 3	Set 4	Set 5	Total	Report
31 Aug	17:30	Sweden	0–3	Netherlands	25–27	16–25	19–25			60–77	Report
31 Aug	20:30	Turkey	3–0	Poland	25–18	25–14	25–23			75–55	Report
1 Sep	17:00	Italy	3–0	Russia	25–20	25–8	25–15			75–43	Report
1 Sep	20:00	Serbia	3–1	France	22–25	25–18	25–7	25–20		97–70	Report

=== Semifinals ===
Date	Time		Score		Set 1	Set 2	Set 3	Set 4	Set 5	Total	Report
3 Sep	17:00	Turkey	1–3	Serbia	34–32	26–28	23–25	13–25		96–110	Report
3 Sep	20:00	Netherlands	1–3	Italy	19–25	17–25	25–16	18–25		79–91	Report

=== 3rd place match ===
Date	Time		Score		Set 1	Set 2	Set 3	Set 4	Set 5	Total	Report
4 Sep	18:00	Turkey	3–0	Netherlands	25–20	25–19	25–23			75–62	Report

=== Final ===
Date	Time		Score		Set 1	Set 2	Set 3	Set 4	Set 5	Total	Report
4 Sep	21:00	Serbia	1–3	Italy	26–24	22–25	19–25	11–25		78–99	Report

== Final standing ==
Rank	Team
1st place, gold medalist(s)	Italy
2nd place, silver medalist(s)	Serbia
3rd place, bronze medalist(s)	Turkey
4	Netherlands
5	Poland
6	Russia
7	France
8	Sweden
9	Bulgaria
10	Croatia
11	Germany
12	Ukraine
13	Belgium
14	Belarus
15	Czech Republic
16	Hungary
17	Slovakia
18	Finland
19	Bosnia and Herzegovina
20	Spain
21	Switzerland
22	Greece
23	Romania
24	Azerbaijan

Qualified for the 2022 World Championship
Already qualified for the 2022 World Championship as defending champions
Qualified for the 2022 World Championship as co-hosts
Qualified for the 2022 World Championship as world ranked non-qualified teams (Russia later disqualified, replaced by Croatia)

2021 Women's Volleyball European champions

Italy
3rd title

14–woman roster
Alessia Gennari, Sara Bonifacio, Ofelia Malinov, Monica De Gennaro, Alessia Orro, Cristina Chirichella, Anna Danesi, Elena Pietrini, Sylvia Nwakalor, Miriam Sylla, Paola Egonu, Beatrice Parrocchiale, Alessia Mazzaro, Sofia D'Odorico
Head coach
Davide Mazzanti

== All Star Team ==
- MVP
  (Italy) Paola Egonu
- Best setter
  (Italy) Alessia Orro
- Best outside hitters
  (Italy) Miriam Sylla
  (Italy) Elena Pietrini
- Best middle blockers
  (Turkey) Eda Erdem Dündar
  (Italy) Anna Danesi
- Best Opposite
  (Serbia) Tijana Bošković
- Best libero
  (Italy) Monica De Gennaro

== See also ==
- 2021 Men's European Volleyball Championship
