= Iranian Women's Volleyball League =

Iranian Volleyball Premier League
- Current season, competition or edition: 2024–25 Iranian Women's Volleyball Premier League
- Sport: Volleyball
- Founded: 1975 officially 2001 with current format
- No. of teams: 14
- Country: Iran
- Most recent champion: Paykan Tehran (3rd title)
- Most titles: Zob Ahan Isfahan (6 titles)
- Website: Volleyball.ir

The Iranian Women's Volleyball Premier League (Persian: لیگ والیبال زنان ایران) is the highest level of professional women's volleyball league in Iran. The highest level of weome's club league in Iran was founded in 1975 as the Shahbanu Cup which was continued until 1979, but after the Iranian Revolution it was renamed to the First Division. In 2001 the league system was revamped and the Iranian Women's Volleyball Premier League was established.

== History ==
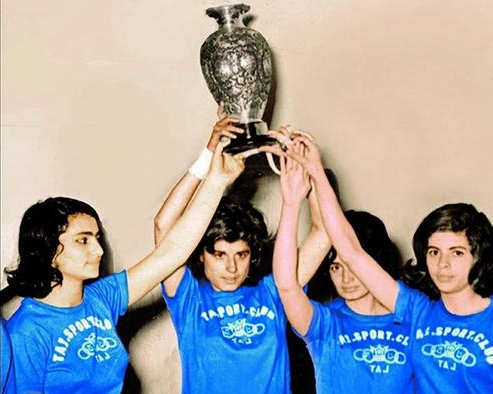
The women's volleyball championship cup of Tehran clubs in 1962 in the hands of Ashraf Vahidian, the captain of the Taj Club, and her teammates.

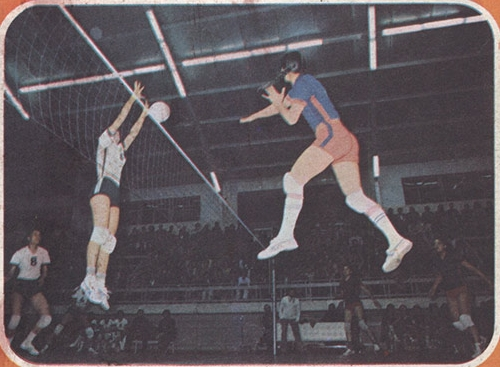
A scene from the pass game against Taj. The last game of the 1978 Tehran Clubs Championship Cup. PAS Tehran (in blue) won against Taj (in white) and became the runner-up in the tournament.

Women volleyball competitions started before 1950s in Iran. The early competitions were held in academic levels and early clubs such as Taj Tehran, Homa Tehran and PAS Tehran were competing in Women's volleyball league of Tehran province since 1950s. At the same time, championship volleyball matches were also held in Iran, in which the representatives of the provinces faced each other. At the end of the Pahlavi era, in 1975, the women's volleyball club cup at the national level started to be held under the name of the Shahbanu Cup. After the revolution, the cup was renamed to the First Division and later to Premier League.

== Current clubs ==
- Paykan Tehran
- Saipa Tehran
- U20 National Team
- Mes Rafsanjan
- Hooran Yazd
- Madakam Net
- Foolad Mobarakeh Sepahan
- Naft Omidiyeh
- Moghavemat Shahrdari Tabriz

== League champions ==
=== Shahbanu Cup ===
Season	Champion	Runner-up	Third place
1975	Homa Tehran	PAS Tehran	Taj Tehran
1976	Taj Tehran	PAS Tehran	Oghab
1977			

=== First Division ===
Season	Champion	Runner-up	Third place
1992			
1993			
1994			
1995	Homa Tehran		
1996	Kashi Isfahan	Estandard Tehran	Persepolis VC
1997			
1998			
1999			
2000	Homa Tehran	Sadra Shiraz	Hejabe Tehran

=== Premier League ===
Season	Champion	Runner-up	Third place
2001	Homa Tehran	PAS Tehran	
2002	Azad University		
2002–03	Homa Tehran	Zob Ahan Isfahan	Azad University
2003–04	Homa Tehran		
2005–06	Zob Ahan Isfahan	Homa Tehran	Naft Tehran
2006–07	Zob Ahan Isfahan	Homa Tehran	Bargh Tehran
2007–08	Zob Ahan Isfahan	Saipa Tehran	Azad University
2008–09	Zob Ahan Isfahan	Saipa Tehran	Azad University
2009–10	Zob Ahan Isfahan	Persepolis	Amol Hijab
2010–11	Persepolis	Zob Ahan Isfahan	Gas Tehran
2011–12	Giti Pasand Isfahan	Tehran Gas	Zob Ahan Isfahan
2012–13	Giti Pasand Isfahan	Zob Ahan Isfahan	Gas Tehran
2013–14	Gas Tehran	Zob Ahan Isfahan	Azad University
2014–15	Azad University	Zob Ahan Isfahan	Gas Tehran
2015–16	Gas Tehran	Azad University	Zob Ahan Isfahan
2016–17	Sarmayeh Bank Tehran	Zob Ahan Isfahan	Azad University
2017–18	Paykan Tehran	Zob Ahan Isfahan	Bahnemir Mazandaran
2018–19	Zob Ahan Isfahan	Paykan Tehran	Namino Isfahan
2019–20	Cancelled due to COVID-19 pandemic		
2020–21	Saipa Tehran	Zob Ahan Isfahan	Paykan Tehran
2021–22	Barij Essence Kashan	Saipa Tehran	Zob Ahan Isfahan
2022–23	Paykan Tehran	Serik Gonbad	Saipa Tehran; Zob Ahan Isfahan
2023–24	Saipa Tehran	Mehrsan Tehran	Foolad Mobarakeh Sepahan; Zob Ahan Isfahan
2024–25	Saipa Tehran	Paykan Tehran	Foolad Mobarakeh Sepahan; U20 National Team

== Titles by club ==
Team	Winners	Runners-Up	Years won	Years runner-up
Zob Ahan Isfahan	6	8	2005–06, 2006–07, 2007–08, 2008–09, 2009–10, 2018–19	2002–03, 2010–11, 2012–13, 2013–14, 2014–15, 2016–17, 2017–18, 2020–21
Homa Tehran	3	2	2001, 2002–03, 2003–04	2005–06, 2006–07
Saipa Tehran	3	1	2020–21, 2023–24, 2024–25	2021–22
Paykan Tehran	2	2	2017–18, 2022–23	2018–19, 2024–25
Azad University	2	1	2002, 2014–15	2015–16
Gas Tehran	2	1	2013–14, 2015–16	2011–12
Giti Pasand Isfahan	2	0	2011–12, 2012–13	—
Persepolis	1	1	2010–11	2009–10
Barij Essence Kashan	1	0	2021–22	—
PAS Tehran	0	1	—	2001
Serik Gonbad	0	1	—	2022–23
Mehrsan Tehran	0	1	—	2023–24

== See also ==
- Iranian Volleyball Super League
