= 2023 Women's European Volleyball Championship =

Tournament details
- Host countries: Belgium; Estonia; Germany; Italy
- Dates: 15 August – 3 September
- Teams: 24
- Venue: 8 (in 8 host cities)

Final positions
- Champions: Turkey (1st title)

Tournament awards
- MVP: (Turkey) Melissa Vargas

Tournament statistics
- Matches played: 76
- Attendance: 193,864 (2,551 per match)

The 2023 Women's European Volleyball Championship was the 33rd edition of the Women's European Volleyball Championship, organised by Europe's governing volleyball body, the Confédération Européenne de Volleyball. For the third consecutive time, it was held in four countries: Belgium, Estonia, Germany and Italy. The top three teams of the tournament qualified for the 2025 FIVB Volleyball Women's World Championship as the CEV representative, except Serbia who had already qualified as the defending world champions.

== Qualification ==
Means of qualification	Qualifier	Means of qualification		Qualifier
Host Countries	Belgium	Qualification	Pool A	Romania
Host Countries	Italy	Qualification	Pool A	Croatia
Host Countries	Estonia	Qualification	Pool B	Czech Republic
Host Countries	Germany	Qualification	Pool B	Finland
2021 European Championship	Serbia	Qualification	Pool C	Ukraine
2021 European Championship	Turkey	Qualification	Pool C	Hungary
2021 European Championship	Netherlands	Qualification	Pool D	Slovenia
2021 European Championship	Poland	Qualification	Pool D	Azerbaijan
2021 European Championship	France	Qualification	Pool E	Slovakia
2021 European Championship	Sweden	Qualification	Pool E	Spain
2021 European Championship	Bulgaria	Qualification	Pool F	Bosnia and Herzegovina
Reallocation	Switzerland	Qualification	Pool F	Greece
Total 24

== Pools composition ==
The drawing of lots was combined with a seeding of National Federations and performed as follows:

1. The four organizers were seeded in Preliminary pools. Belgium in Pool A, Italy in Pool B, Germany in Pool C and Estonia in Pool D.
2. The finalists from the previous edition were drawn in different Preliminary pools, meaning that Italy could not be paired with Serbia.
3. The organizers could select one team to join their pools, as a result, Slovenia joined Belgium in Pool A, Romania joined Italy in Pool B, Azerbaijan joined Germany in Pool C and Finland joined Estonia in Pool D.
4. According to the CEV National Team ranking list, the 16 remaining teams were seeded by descending order in a number of cups that equals the number of Preliminary pools.

Pot 1	Pot 2	Pot 3	Pot 4
Serbia; Turkey; Netherlands; Bulgaria	Poland; Croatia; Czech Republic; France	Ukraine; Slovakia; Bosnia and Herzegovina; Sweden	Greece; Spain; Hungary; Switzerland

Draw

The drawing of lots was held on 16 November 2022 in Naples, Italy.

Pool A	Pool B	Pool C	Pool D
Belgium	Italy	Germany	Estonia
Slovenia	Romania	Azerbaijan	Finland
Serbia	Bulgaria	Turkey	Netherlands
Poland	Croatia	Czech Republic	France
Ukraine	Bosnia and Herzegovina	Sweden	Slovakia
Hungary	Switzerland	Greece	Spain

== Venues ==
(Belgium) Ghent (Pool A)	(Belgium) Brussels (All knockout rounds)	(Estonia) Tallinn (Pool D)	(Germany) Düsseldorf (Pool C)
Flanders Sports Arena	Palais 12	Unibet Arena	Castello Düsseldorf
Capacity: 4,500	Capacity: 8,600	Capacity: 4,900	Capacity: 3,163
2023 Women's European Volleyball Championship is located in Europe
(Italy) Verona (Pool B) (15 August)	(Italy) Monza (Pool B) (16-19 August)	(Italy) Turin (Pool B) (21-23 August)	(Italy) Florence (Round of 16 and Quarterfinals)
Verona Arena	Monza Arena	PalaRuffini	Palazzo Wanny
Capacity: 10,000	Capacity: 6,000	Capacity: 6,000	Capacity: 6,000

== Pool standing procedure ==
1. Number of matches won
2. Match points
3. Sets ratio
4. Points ratio
5. If the tie continues as per the point ratio between two teams, the priority will be given to the team which won the match between them. When the tie in points ratio is between three or more teams, a new classification of these teams in the terms of points 1, 2, 3 and 4 will be made taking into consideration only the matches in which they were opposed to each other.

Match won 3–0 or 3–1: 3 match points for the winner, 0 match points for the loser
Match won 3–2: 2 match points for the winner, 1 match point for the loser

== Preliminary round ==
- All times are local.
- The top four teams in each pool will qualify for the final round.

=== Pool A ===
Pos	Team	Pld	W	L	Pts	SW	SL	SR	SPW	SPL	SPR	Qualification
1	Serbia	5	5	0	15	15	2	7.500	414	285	1.453	Final round
2	Poland	5	4	1	12	13	5	2.600	422	362	1.166	Final round
3	Ukraine	5	3	2	9	10	7	1.429	371	383	0.969	Final round
4	Belgium (H)	5	2	3	6	6	10	0.600	355	370	0.959	Final round
5	Slovenia	5	1	4	3	5	12	0.417	357	403	0.886	
6	Hungary	5	0	5	0	2	15	0.133	302	418	0.722	

Source: CEV
(H) Host

Date	Time		Score		Set 1	Set 2	Set 3	Set 4	Set 5	Total	Report
17 Aug	20:00	Hungary	0–3	Belgium	16–25	15–25	19–25			50–75	Report
18 Aug	17:00	Serbia	3–0	Ukraine	25–14	25–19	25–16			75–49	Report
18 Aug	20:00	Slovenia	0–3	Poland	19–25	14–25	19–25			52–75	Report
19 Aug	17:00	Ukraine	3–0	Hungary	25–17	26–24	25–17			76–58	Report
19 Aug	20:00	Slovenia	1–3	Belgium	18–25	20–25	25–21	32–34		95–105	Report
20 Aug	17:00	Serbia	3–0	Slovenia	25–20	25–11	25–15			75–46	Report
20 Aug	20:00	Hungary	1–3	Poland	22–25	12–25	25–21	16–25		75–96	Report
21 Aug	17:00	Poland	1–3	Serbia	25–18	13–25	23–25	18–25		79–93	Report
21 Aug	20:00	Belgium	0–3	Ukraine	18–25	23–25	23–25			64–75	Report
22 Aug	17:00	Slovenia	3–0	Hungary	25–19	25–18	25–16			75–53	Report
22 Aug	20:00	Belgium	0–3	Poland	22–25	23–25	21–25			66–75	Report
23 Aug	17:00	Ukraine	3–1	Slovenia	19–25	25–23	26–24	25–17		95–89	Report
23 Aug	20:00	Hungary	1–3	Serbia	25–21	12–25	14–25	15–25		66–96	Report
24 Aug	17:00	Poland	3–1	Ukraine	25–17	22–25	25–17	25–17		97–76	Report
24 Aug	20:00	Serbia	3–0	Belgium	25–13	25–13	25–19			75–45	Report

=== Pool B ===
Pos	Team	Pld	W	L	Pts	SW	SL	SR	SPW	SPL	SPR	Qualification
1	Italy (H)	5	5	0	15	15	0	MAX	375	261	1.437	Final round
2	Bulgaria	5	4	1	11	12	8	1.500	440	424	1.038	Final round
3	Romania	5	2	3	7	10	12	0.833	458	478	0.958	Final round
4	Switzerland	5	2	3	6	9	12	0.750	417	472	0.883	Final round
5	Bosnia and Herzegovina	5	2	3	5	9	13	0.692	456	463	0.985	
6	Croatia	5	0	5	1	5	15	0.333	420	468	0.897	

Source: CEV
(H) Host

Date	Time		Score		Set 1	Set 2	Set 3	Set 4	Set 5	Total	Report
15 Aug	20:00	Italy	3–0	Romania	25–19	25–19	25–15			75–53	Report
16 Aug	18:00	Switzerland	2–3	Bosnia and Herzegovina	25–16	15–25	25–23	17–25	15–17	97–106	Report
16 Aug	21:00	Bulgaria	3–1	Croatia	23–25	25–23	25–20	25–18		98–86	Report
17 Aug	18:00	Bosnia and Herzegovina	1–3	Bulgaria	20–25	19–25	25–19	18–25		82–94	Report
17 Aug	21:00	Romania	3–1	Croatia	25–22	25–21	23–25	25–19		98–87	Report
18 Aug	18:00	Bosnia and Herzegovina	3–2	Croatia	19–25	25–18	20–25	26–24	15–6	105–98	Report
18 Aug	21:15	Italy	3–0	Switzerland	25–14	25–19	25–13			75–46	Report
19 Aug	18:00	Romania	2–3	Switzerland	21–25	25–18	25–27	25–19	9–15	105–104	Report
19 Aug	21:00	Bulgaria	0–3	Italy	16–25	17–25	13–25			46–75	Report
21 Aug	18:00	Bosnia and Herzegovina	2–3	Romania	25–12	24–26	21–25	25–21	11–15	106–99	Report
21 Aug	21:00	Croatia	1–3	Switzerland	19–25	25–16	22–25	24–26		90–92	Report
22 Aug	18:00	Bulgaria	3–2	Romania	26–24	18–25	25–17	22–25	15–12	106–103	Report
22 Aug	21:15	Italy	3–0	Bosnia and Herzegovina	25–21	25–17	25–19			75–57	Report
23 Aug	18:00	Switzerland	1–3	Bulgaria	25–21	23–25	17–25	13–25		78–96	Report
23 Aug	21:00	Italy	3–0	Croatia	25–23	25–19	25–17			75–59	Report

=== Pool C ===
Pos	Team	Pld	W	L	Pts	SW	SL	SR	SPW	SPL	SPR	Qualification
1	Turkey	5	5	0	15	15	1	15.000	402	304	1.322	Final round
2	Czech Republic	5	3	2	8	10	8	1.250	395	405	0.975	Final round
3	Germany (H)	5	2	3	7	9	10	0.900	414	421	0.983	Final round
4	Sweden	5	2	3	6	7	11	0.636	393	404	0.973	Final round
5	Azerbaijan	5	2	3	5	8	11	0.727	383	403	0.950	
6	Greece	5	1	4	4	5	13	0.385	392	442	0.887	

Source: CEV
(H) Host

Date	Time		Score		Set 1	Set 2	Set 3	Set 4	Set 5	Total	Report
17 Aug	20:00	Greece	0–3	Germany	19–25	21–25	27–29			67–79	Report
18 Aug	17:00	Turkey	3–0	Sweden	25–22	25–18	25–13			75–53	Report
18 Aug	20:00	Azerbaijan	3–0	Czech Republic	25–21	25–10	25–15			75–46	Report
19 Aug	17:00	Sweden	1–3	Greece	23–25	25–19	25–27	22–25		95–96	Report
19 Aug	20:00	Azerbaijan	1–3	Germany	13–25	22–25	25–12	14–25		74–87	Report
20 Aug	17:00	Greece	0–3	Czech Republic	21–25	22–25	17–25			60–75	Report
20 Aug	20:00	Turkey	3–0	Azerbaijan	25–13	25–13	25–13			75–39	Report
21 Aug	17:00	Czech Republic	1–3	Turkey	23–25	20–25	25–20	17–25		85–95	Report
21 Aug	20:00	Germany	1–3	Sweden	25–13	16–25	18–25	18–25		77–88	Report
22 Aug	17:00	Azerbaijan	3–2	Greece	22–25	25–19	27–29	25–18	15–12	114–103	Report
22 Aug	20:00	Germany	2–3	Czech Republic	25–22	25–23	24–26	20–25	16–18	110–114	Report
23 Aug	17:00	Greece	0–3	Turkey	24–26	16–25	26–28			66–79	Report
23 Aug	20:00	Sweden	3–1	Azerbaijan	25–17	17–25	25–21	25–18		92–81	Report
24 Aug	17:00	Czech Republic	3–0	Sweden	25–23	25–20	25–22			75–65	Report
24 Aug	20:00	Turkey	3–0	Germany	25–15	25–20	28–26			78–61	Report

=== Pool D ===
Pos	Team	Pld	W	L	Pts	SW	SL	SR	SPW	SPL	SPR	Qualification
1	Netherlands	5	5	0	15	15	1	15.000	401	326	1.230	Final round
2	France	5	4	1	11	13	5	2.600	432	352	1.227	Final round
3	Slovakia	5	3	2	9	9	7	1.286	361	346	1.043	Final round
4	Spain	5	2	3	7	8	11	0.727	410	435	0.943	Final round
5	Finland	5	1	4	2	4	14	0.286	373	429	0.869	
6	Estonia (H)	5	0	5	1	4	15	0.267	363	452	0.803	

Source: CEV
(H) Host

Date	Time		Score		Set 1	Set 2	Set 3	Set 4	Set 5	Total	Report
16 Aug	20:00	Estonia	0–3	France	8–25	19–25	21–25			48–75	Report
17 Aug	17:00	Finland	0–3	Slovakia	20–25	23–25	16–25			59–75	Report
17 Aug	20:00	Netherlands	3–0	Spain	25–23	25–19	25–21			75–63	Report
18 Aug	17:00	Slovakia	0–3	Netherlands	20–25	19–25	19–25			58–75	Report
18 Aug	20:00	France	3–2	Spain	22–25	25–18	23–25	25–17	15–10	110–95	Report
19 Aug	16:00	Slovakia	3–0	Spain	25–17	26–24	25–19			76–60	Report
19 Aug	19:00	Estonia	2–3	Finland	25–21	20–25	25–23	20–25	13–15	103–109	Report
20 Aug	16:00	France	3–0	Finland	25–22	25–22	25–14			75–58	Report
20 Aug	19:00	Netherlands	3–0	Estonia	25–8	27–25	25–19			77–52	Report
21 Aug	17:00	France	3–0	Slovakia	25–21	25–19	25–12			75–52	Report
21 Aug	20:00	Spain	3–1	Finland	25–17	24–26	26–24	26–24		101–91	Report
22 Aug	17:00	Netherlands	3–1	France	25–23	27–25	21–25	26–24		99–97	Report
22 Aug	20:00	Estonia	1–3	Slovakia	26–24	24–26	9–25	18–25		77–100	Report
23 Aug	17:00	Finland	0–3	Netherlands	18–25	21–25	17–25			56–75	Report
23 Aug	20:00	Estonia	1–3	Spain	25–16	21–25	20–25	17–25		83–91	Report

== Final round ==
- All times are Central European Summer Time (UTC+02:00).

Round of 16
28 August – Brussels
Serbia	3
Sweden	0
28 August – Brussels
Czech Republic	3
Ukraine	2
27 August – Florence
Netherlands	3
Switzerland	0
27 August – Florence
Bulgaria	3
Slovakia	2
27 August – Brussels
Turkey	3
Belgium	1
27 August – Brussels
Poland	3
Germany	0
26 August – Florence
Italy	3
Spain	0
26 August – Florence
France	3
Romania	1

Quarterfinals
30 August – Brussels
Serbia	3
Czech Republic	1
29 August – Florence
Netherlands	3
Bulgaria	0
30 August – Brussels
Turkey	3
Poland	0
29 August – Florence
Italy	3
France	0

Semifinals
1 September – Brussels
Serbia	3
Netherlands	1
1 September – Brussels
Turkey	3
Italy	2

Final
3 September – Brussels
Serbia	2
Turkey	3
3rd place match
3 September – Brussels
Netherlands	3
Italy	0

=== Round of 16 ===
Date	Time		Score		Set 1	Set 2	Set 3	Set 4	Set 5	Total	Report
26 Aug	18:00	France	3–1	Romania	25–23	25–16	21–25	25–23		96–87	Report
26 Aug	21:15	Italy	3–0	Spain	25–23	25–22	25–19			75–64	Report
27 Aug	17:00	Turkey	3–1	Belgium	25–22	16–25	25–15	32–30		98–92	Report
27 Aug	18:00	Netherlands	3–0	Switzerland	25–17	25–19	25–12			75–48	Report
27 Aug	20:00	Poland	3–0	Germany	25–22	25–20	26–24			76–66	Report
27 Aug	21:00	Bulgaria	3–2	Slovakia	16–25	17–25	25–19	25–20	15–9	98–98	Report
28 Aug	17:00	Serbia	3–0	Sweden	25–17	25–13	25–16			75–46	Report
28 Aug	20:00	Czech Republic	3–2	Ukraine	25–22	25–22	20–25	10–25	15–12	95–106	Report

=== Quarterfinals ===
Date	Time		Score		Set 1	Set 2	Set 3	Set 4	Set 5	Total	Report
29 Aug	18:00	Netherlands	3–0	Bulgaria	25–11	25–13	25–19			75–43	Report
29 Aug	21:15	Italy	3–0	France	25–14	29–27	25–13			79–54	Report
30 Aug	17:00	Turkey	3–0	Poland	25–23	25–22	25–18			75–63	Report
30 Aug	20:00	Serbia	3–1	Czech Republic	24–26	25–17	25–11	25–14		99–68	Report

=== Semifinals ===
Date	Time		Score		Set 1	Set 2	Set 3	Set 4	Set 5	Total	Report
1 Sep	17:00	Turkey	3–2	Italy	18–25	25–23	15–25	25–22	15–6	98–101	Report
1 Sep	20:30	Serbia	3–1	Netherlands	25–21	15–25	25–22	25–21		90–89	Report

=== 3rd place match ===
Date	Time		Score		Set 1	Set 2	Set 3	Set 4	Set 5	Total	Report
3 Sep	16:30	Netherlands	3–0	Italy	25–23	28–26	25–20			78–69	Report

=== Final ===
Date	Time		Score		Set 1	Set 2	Set 3	Set 4	Set 5	Total	Report
3 Sep	20:00	Serbia	2–3	Turkey	27–25	21–25	25–22	22–25	13–15	108–112	Report

== Final standing ==
Rank	Team
1st place, gold medalist(s)	Turkey
2nd place, silver medalist(s)	Serbia
3rd place, bronze medalist(s)	Netherlands
4	Italy
5	Poland
6	France
7	Bulgaria
8	Czech Republic
9	Ukraine
10	Slovakia
11	Romania
12	Germany
13	Spain
14	Switzerland
15	Belgium
16	Sweden
17	Azerbaijan
18	Bosnia and Herzegovina
19	Greece
20	Slovenia
21	Finland
22	Croatia
23	Estonia
24	Hungary

Qualified for the 2025 World Championship
Qualified for the 2025 World Championship as defending champions
Qualified for the 2025 World Championship via FIVB World Ranking

2023 Women's Volleyball European champions

Turkey
1st title

14–woman roster
Gizem Örge, Simge Şebnem Aköz, Cansu Özbay, Melissa Vargas, Ayça Aykaç, Kübra Akman, Hande Baladın, Derya Cebecioğlu, Elif Şahin, Eda Erdem (C), Zehra Güneş, Aslı Kalaç, İlkin Aydın, Ebrar Karakurt
Head coach
Daniele Santarelli

== See also ==
- 2023 Men's European Volleyball Championship
