= Kazakhstani women's volleyball league =

Women's volleyball league

Kazakh Volleyball League
- Current season, competition or edition: 2020–21 Kazakh Volleyball Women's League
- Sport: Volleyball
- Founded: 1992
- First season: 1993
- Administrator: ФВРК
- No. of teams: 8 (2020–21)
- Country: Kazakhstan
- Continent: Asia
- Most recent champion: Altay VC (5th title)
- Most titles: VC Zhetysu(9 titles)
- Level on pyramid: 1 Level
- Relegation to: 2nd League
- Domestic cups: Kazakh Cup; Kazakh Super Cup
- International cup: AVC Club Championship

The Kazakhstan Women's Volleyball League is an annual competition for women's volleyball clubs in Kazakhstan . It has been held since the 1992/93 season.

Competitions are held in three divisions : the National League and the major leagues "A" and "B".

== History ==
8 teams took part in the National League 2020/21: Altai (Ust-Kamenogorsk), Zhetysu (Taldykorgan), Kuanysh (Petropavlovsk), Almaty, Karaganda, Irtysh-Kazkhrom (Pavlodar), "Altai" -2 (Ust-Kamenogorsk), "Aru-Astana" (Nur-Sultan). The title was won by Altai, who won the final series beating Zhetysu 2-0 (3: 2, 3: 1). 3rd place was taken by "Kuanysh".

=== List of champions ===
Years	Champions	Runners up	Third place
1993	Azia-ADK Alma-Ata		
1994	ADK Alma-Ata		
1995	Pouls Pavlodar		
1996	Bazis-ADK Alma-Ata		
1997	Irtych Pavlodar		
1998	Irtych Pavlodar		
1999	Alma-Dinamo Alma-Ata		
2000	Astana-Kanaty Astana		
2001	Rakhat Alma-Ata		
2002	Rakhat Alma-Ata		
2003	Rakhat Alma-Ata		
2004	Rakhat Alma-Ata	Jetysou Taldykorgan	
2005	Rakhat Alma-Ata	Jetysou Taldykorgan	
2006	Rakhat Alma-Ata	Jetysou Taldykorgan	
2007	Rakhat Alma-Ata	Jetysou Taldykorgan	
2008	Rakhat Alma-Ata		
2009	Jetysou Taldykorgan		
2010	Jetysou Taldykorgan	Irtych-Kazkhrom	
2011	Jetysou Taldykorgan	Irtych-Kazkhrom	VK Karaganda
2012	Jetysou Taldykorgan	VK Astana	Irtych-Kazkhrom
2013	Jetysou Taldykorgan	VK Astana	Irtych-Kazkhrom
2014	Jetysou Taldykorgan	Irtych-Kazkhrom	VK Almaty
2015	Jetysou Taldykorgan	Irtych-Kazkhrom	VK Almaty
2016	Altay VC	Jetysou Taldykorgan	Irtych-Kazkhrom
2017	Altay VC	Irtych-Kazkhrom	Jetysou Taldykorgan
2018	Altay VC	Jetysou Taldykorgan	Irtych-Kazkhrom
2019	Altay VC	Jetysou Taldykorgan	Irtych-Kazkhrom
2020	Jetysou Taldykorgan	Altay VC	Irtych-Kazkhrom
