= 2014 FIVB World Grand Prix squads =

This article show all participating team squads at the 2014 FIVB Volleyball World Grand Prix, played by twelve countries with the final round held in

== Algeria ==
- Head Coach:

The following is the Algeria roster in the 2014 FIVB World Grand Prix.

#	Name	Date of birth	Height	Weight	Spike	Block	Club
1	Dallal Merwa Achour	3 November 1994	176 cm (5 ft 9 in)	60 kg (130 lb)	275 cm (9 ft 0 in)	262 cm (8 ft 7 in)	Asv Blida
2	Nawel Hammouche	25 April 1997	185 cm (6 ft 1 in)	62 kg (137 lb)	275 cm (9 ft 0 in)	265 cm (8 ft 8 in)	Ncbejaia
3	Salima Hammouche	17 January 1984	158 cm (5 ft 2 in)	54 kg (119 lb)	270 cm (8 ft 10 in)	265 cm (8 ft 8 in)	G.S.Petroliers
4	Nadira Ait Oumghar	9 October 1994	185 cm (6 ft 1 in)	77 kg (170 lb)	281 cm (9 ft 3 in)	263 cm (8 ft 8 in)	Seddouk Volleyball
5	Yasmine Abderrahim	16 April 1999	175 cm (5 ft 9 in)	56 kg (123 lb)	270 cm (8 ft 10 in)	265 cm (8 ft 8 in)	ASWBEJAIA
6	Silya Magnana	16 March 1991	181 cm (5 ft 11 in)	68 kg (150 lb)	274 cm (9 ft 0 in)	261 cm (8 ft 7 in)	Mb Bejaia
7	Yasmine Ousalah	4 July 1993	174 cm (5 ft 9 in)	60 kg (130 lb)	270 cm (8 ft 10 in)	268 cm (8 ft 10 in)	Asw Bejaia
8	Louiza Bayou	25 May 1994	172 cm (5 ft 8 in)	60 kg (130 lb)	285 cm (9 ft 4 in)	279 cm (9 ft 2 in)	ASWBEJAIA
9	Celia Bourihane	22 January 1995	178 cm (5 ft 10 in)	56 kg (123 lb)	277 cm (9 ft 1 in)	255 cm (8 ft 4 in)	Ncbejaia
10	Fatima Zahra Oukazi	18 January 1984	175 cm (5 ft 9 in)	67 kg (148 lb)	295 cm (9 ft 8 in)	283 cm (9 ft 3 in)	G.S.Petroliers
11	Mouni Abderrahim	19 November 1985	171 cm (5 ft 7 in)	60 kg (130 lb)	305 cm (10 ft 0 in)	293 cm (9 ft 7 in)	Mb Bejaia
12	Safia Boukhima	10 January 1991	176 cm (5 ft 9 in)	64 kg (141 lb)	294 cm (9 ft 8 in)	284 cm (9 ft 4 in)	G.S.Petroliers
13	Nawal Mansouri	1 August 1985	174 cm (5 ft 9 in)	64 kg (141 lb)	291 cm (9 ft 7 in)	281 cm (9 ft 3 in)	Mb Bejaia
14	Chettout Kahina	20 May 1992	168 cm (5 ft 6 in)	60 kg (130 lb)	260 cm (8 ft 6 in)	255 cm (8 ft 4 in)	NR CHLEF
15	Aicha Mezemate	6 June 1991	187 cm (6 ft 2 in)	75 kg (165 lb)	300 cm (9 ft 10 in)	285 cm (9 ft 4 in)	G.S.Petroliers
16	Siham Saoud	18 July 1993	174 cm (5 ft 9 in)	62 kg (137 lb)	295 cm (9 ft 8 in)	280 cm (9 ft 2 in)	Asw Bejaia
17	Lydia Oulmou	2 February 1986	181 cm (5 ft 11 in)	59 kg (130 lb)	291 cm (9 ft 7 in)	284 cm (9 ft 4 in)	Hainaut Volley
18	Tassadit Aissou	19 June 1989	184 cm (6 ft 0 in)	80 kg (180 lb)	295 cm (9 ft 8 in)	285 cm (9 ft 4 in)	Nedjmet Chlef
19	Kahina Arbouche	4 September 1993	175 cm (5 ft 9 in)	60 kg (130 lb)	295 cm (9 ft 8 in)	280 cm (9 ft 2 in)	Asw Bejaia
20	Rayhana Miloud Hocine	3 January 1996	162 cm (5 ft 4 in)	52 kg (115 lb)	257 cm (8 ft 5 in)	249 cm (8 ft 2 in)	WOChlef
21	Redouani Amina	9 September 1984	180 cm (5 ft 11 in)	60 kg (130 lb)	300 cm (9 ft 10 in)	290 cm (9 ft 6 in)	ROMANS VOLLEYBALL
22	Zaidi Amel	3 March 1995	175 cm (5 ft 9 in)	58 kg (128 lb)	278 cm (9 ft 1 in)	260 cm (8 ft 6 in)	R.C.BEJAIA

== Argentina ==
- Head Coach:

The following is the Argentina roster in the 2014 FIVB World Grand Prix.

#	Name	Date of birth	Height	Weight	Spike	Block	Club
1	Lucia Gaido	19 January 1988	164 cm (5 ft 5 in)	53 kg (117 lb)	245 cm (8 ft 0 in)	244 cm (8 ft 0 in)	Stiinta Bacau
2	Tanya Acosta	11 March 1991	182 cm (6 ft 0 in)	70 kg (150 lb)	287 cm (9 ft 5 in)	280 cm (9 ft 2 in)	GELP
3	Paula Yamila Nizetich	27 January 1989	181 cm (5 ft 11 in)	74 kg (163 lb)	305 cm (10 ft 0 in)	295 cm (9 ft 8 in)	NIlufer
4	Patricia Oillataguerre	7 June 1988	197 cm (6 ft 6 in)	80 kg (180 lb)	310 cm (10 ft 2 in)	295 cm (9 ft 8 in)	San Lorenzo
5	Lucia Fresco	14 May 1991	195 cm (6 ft 5 in)	92 kg (203 lb)	304 cm (10 ft 0 in)	290 cm (9 ft 6 in)	Urbino
6	Elina Rodriguez	11 February 1997	189 cm (6 ft 2 in)	72 kg (159 lb)	300 cm (9 ft 10 in)	284 cm (9 ft 4 in)	San Lorenzo
7	Natalia Aispurua	20 December 1991	192 cm (6 ft 4 in)	78 kg (172 lb)	310 cm (10 ft 2 in)	293 cm (9 ft 7 in)	Boca Juniors
8	Sol Piccolo	11 September 1996	184 cm (6 ft 0 in)	74 kg (163 lb)	294 cm (9 ft 8 in)	282 cm (9 ft 3 in)	Velez Sarsfield
9	Karina Suligoy	14 December 1988	172 cm (5 ft 8 in)	68 kg (150 lb)	289 cm (9 ft 6 in)	270 cm (8 ft 10 in)	Villa Dora
10	Emilce Sosa	11 September 1987	177 cm (5 ft 10 in)	72 kg (159 lb)	305 cm (10 ft 0 in)	295 cm (9 ft 8 in)	Rio Do Soul
11	Julieta Constanza Lazcano	25 July 1989	190 cm (6 ft 3 in)	74 kg (163 lb)	312 cm (10 ft 3 in)	293 cm (9 ft 7 in)	Istres
12	Tatiana Soledad Rizzo	30 December 1986	178 cm (5 ft 10 in)	64 kg (141 lb)	280 cm (9 ft 2 in)	268 cm (8 ft 10 in)	Boca Juniors
13	Leticia Boscacci	8 November 1985	186 cm (6 ft 1 in)	70 kg (150 lb)	302 cm (9 ft 11 in)	284 cm (9 ft 4 in)	VC Kanti
14	Josefina Fernandez	17 August 1991	175 cm (5 ft 9 in)	72 kg (159 lb)	294 cm (9 ft 8 in)	284 cm (9 ft 4 in)	Hotel VFM
16	Florencia Natasha Busquets Reyes	27 June 1989	192 cm (6 ft 4 in)	68 kg (150 lb)	305 cm (10 ft 0 in)	290 cm (9 ft 6 in)	Hotel VFM
17	Antonela Ayelen Curatola	23 October 1991	175 cm (5 ft 9 in)	71 kg (157 lb)	290 cm (9 ft 6 in)	280 cm (9 ft 2 in)	Velez Sarsfield
18	Yael Castiglione	27 September 1985	184 cm (6 ft 0 in)	75 kg (165 lb)	295 cm (9 ft 8 in)	281 cm (9 ft 3 in)	Rio Do Soul
19	Barbara Frangella	17 February 1996	179 cm (5 ft 10 in)	68 kg (150 lb)	289 cm (9 ft 6 in)	280 cm (9 ft 2 in)	Boca Juniors
20	Micaela Fabiani	13 June 1995	177 cm (5 ft 10 in)	70 kg (150 lb)	297 cm (9 ft 9 in)	290 cm (9 ft 6 in)	Boca Juniors
21	Morena Martinez Franchi	19 February 1993	164 cm (5 ft 5 in)	62 kg (137 lb)	285 cm (9 ft 4 in)	264 cm (8 ft 8 in)	Velez Sarsfield
22	Eugenia Nosach	31 March 1993	175 cm (5 ft 9 in)	66 kg (146 lb)	290 cm (9 ft 6 in)	277 cm (9 ft 1 in)	Boca Juniors

== Australia ==
- Head Coach:

The following is the Australia roster in the 2014 FIVB World Grand Prix.

#	Name	Date of birth	Height	Weight	Spike	Block	Club
1	Katarina Osadchuk	18 November 1991	191 cm (6 ft 3 in)	80 kg (180 lb)	320 cm (10 ft 6 in)	310 cm (10 ft 2 in)	Sulechow
2	Sophie Paine	1 September 1992	176 cm (5 ft 9 in)	65 kg (143 lb)	287 cm (9 ft 5 in)	276 cm (9 ft 1 in)	University of Houston
3	Nikala Cunningham	7 August 1994	177 cm (5 ft 10 in)	68 kg (150 lb)	285 cm (9 ft 4 in)	274 cm (9 ft 0 in)	Queensland Pirates
4	Sophie Godfrey	2 December 1987	186 cm (6 ft 1 in)	73 kg (161 lb)	295 cm (9 ft 8 in)	284 cm (9 ft 4 in)	Ostrowiec
5	Tara West	29 November 1985	183 cm (6 ft 0 in)	78 kg (172 lb)	307 cm (10 ft 1 in)	292 cm (9 ft 7 in)	WA Pearls
6	Olivia Orchard	4 February 1984	171 cm (5 ft 7 in)	62 kg (137 lb)	290 cm (9 ft 6 in)	282 cm (9 ft 3 in)	University Blues
7	Satasha Savea	28 May 1989	180 cm (5 ft 11 in)	70 kg (150 lb)	297 cm (9 ft 9 in)	282 cm (9 ft 3 in)	UTSSU
8	Jennifer Margery Day	27 December 1984	185 cm (6 ft 1 in)	68 kg (150 lb)	297 cm (9 ft 9 in)	288 cm (9 ft 5 in)	WA Pearls
9	Rachel Rourke	1 October 1988	192 cm (6 ft 4 in)	85 kg (187 lb)	315 cm (10 ft 4 in)	300 cm (9 ft 10 in)	Incheon Pink Spiders
10	Lauren Bertolacci	26 January 1985	171 cm (5 ft 7 in)	68 kg (150 lb)	283 cm (9 ft 3 in)	278 cm (9 ft 1 in)	FC Luzern
11	Rebecca Walter	10 August 1987	173 cm (5 ft 8 in)	75 kg (165 lb)	288 cm (9 ft 5 in)	257 cm (8 ft 5 in)	University Blues
12	Agnieszka Kudziela	26 March 1996	183 cm (6 ft 0 in)	70 kg (150 lb)	299 cm (9 ft 10 in)	288 cm (9 ft 5 in)	Queensland
13	Beth Carey	28 September 1990	190 cm (6 ft 3 in)	78 kg (172 lb)	300 cm (9 ft 10 in)	290 cm (9 ft 6 in)	South Australia
14	Rebecca Reeve	23 May 1994	181 cm (5 ft 11 in)	69 kg (152 lb)	294 cm (9 ft 8 in)	283 cm (9 ft 3 in)	Blinn College
15	Eliza Hynes	29 January 1992	183 cm (6 ft 0 in)	70 kg (150 lb)	305 cm (10 ft 0 in)	292 cm (9 ft 7 in)	Victoria Volleyball Academy
16	Sarah Choat	14 June 1984	176 cm (5 ft 9 in)	72 kg (159 lb)	284 cm (9 ft 4 in)	269 cm (8 ft 10 in)	South Australia
17	Jessica Ryder	18 May 1992	178 cm (5 ft 10 in)	68 kg (150 lb)	295 cm (9 ft 8 in)	286 cm (9 ft 5 in)	Queensland Pirates
18	Taylor Donovan	5 May 1992	193 cm (6 ft 4 in)	78 kg (172 lb)	312 cm (10 ft 3 in)	300 cm (9 ft 10 in)	Queensland
19	Monique Stojanovic	27 April 1992	188 cm (6 ft 2 in)	72 kg (159 lb)	298 cm (9 ft 9 in)	290 cm (9 ft 6 in)	Victoria Volleyball Academy

== Belgium ==
- Head Coach:

The following is the Belgium roster in the 2014 FIVB World Grand Prix.

#	Name	Date of birth	Height	Weight	Spike	Block	Club
1	Angie Bland	26 April 1984	187 cm (6 ft 2 in)	65 kg (143 lb)	306 cm (10 ft 0 in)	298 cm (9 ft 9 in)	Nantes
2	Jasmien Biebauw	24 September 1990	180 cm (5 ft 11 in)	81 kg (179 lb)	295 cm (9 ft 8 in)	274 cm (9 ft 0 in)	Asterix Kieldrecht
3	Frauke Dirickx	3 January 1980	186 cm (6 ft 1 in)	75 kg (165 lb)	308 cm (10 ft 1 in)	303 cm (9 ft 11 in)	Piacenza
4	Nina Coolman	25 January 1991	180 cm (5 ft 11 in)	70 kg (150 lb)	305 cm (10 ft 0 in)	293 cm (9 ft 7 in)	Paris-St-Cloud
5	Laura Heyrman	17 May 1993	186 cm (6 ft 1 in)	74 kg (163 lb)	310 cm (10 ft 2 in)	280 cm (9 ft 2 in)	MODENA
6	Charlotte Leys	18 March 1989	184 cm (6 ft 0 in)	78 kg (172 lb)	305 cm (10 ft 0 in)	293 cm (9 ft 7 in)	SOPOT
7	Valerie Courtois	1 November 1990	171 cm (5 ft 7 in)	66 kg (146 lb)	280 cm (9 ft 2 in)	275 cm (9 ft 0 in)	Lodz
8	Kaja Grobelna	4 January 1995	188 cm (6 ft 2 in)	73 kg (161 lb)	318 cm (10 ft 5 in)	289 cm (9 ft 6 in)	Asterix Kieldrecht
9	Freya Aelbrecht	10 February 1990	187 cm (6 ft 2 in)	81 kg (179 lb)	312 cm (10 ft 3 in)	295 cm (9 ft 8 in)	Busto Arsizio
10	Lise Van Hecke	1 July 1992	188 cm (6 ft 2 in)	75 kg (165 lb)	299 cm (9 ft 10 in)	281 cm (9 ft 3 in)	PIACENZA
11	Els Vandesteene	30 May 1987	184 cm (6 ft 0 in)	70 kg (150 lb)	305 cm (10 ft 0 in)	290 cm (9 ft 6 in)	NANTES
12	Dominika Strumilo	26 December 1996	187 cm (6 ft 2 in)	63 kg (139 lb)	311 cm (10 ft 2 in)	292 cm (9 ft 7 in)	Asterix Kieldrecht
13	Nathalie Lemmens	12 March 1995	192 cm (6 ft 4 in)	85 kg (187 lb)	311 cm (10 ft 2 in)	288 cm (9 ft 5 in)	Asterix Kieldrecht
14	Helene Rousseaux	25 September 1991	188 cm (6 ft 2 in)	72 kg (159 lb)	322 cm (10 ft 7 in)	300 cm (9 ft 10 in)	Modena
15	Lore Gillis	29 November 1988	188 cm (6 ft 2 in)	72 kg (159 lb)	305 cm (10 ft 0 in)	295 cm (9 ft 8 in)	VC Oudegem
16	Karolina Goliat	25 October 1996	190 cm (6 ft 3 in)	79 kg (174 lb)	308 cm (10 ft 1 in)	295 cm (9 ft 8 in)	VDK Gent
17	Maud Catry	4 September 1990	189 cm (6 ft 2 in)	82 kg (181 lb)	311 cm (10 ft 2 in)	304 cm (10 ft 0 in)	Paris St.-Cloud
18	Britt Ruysschaert	27 May 1994	174 cm (5 ft 9 in)	60 kg (130 lb)	302 cm (9 ft 11 in)	281 cm (9 ft 3 in)	Asterix Kieldrecht
19	Sarah Cools	14 April 1997	188 cm (6 ft 2 in)	67 kg (148 lb)	316 cm (10 ft 4 in)	291 cm (9 ft 7 in)	Asterix Kieldrecht
20	Ilka Van de Vyver	26 January 1993	179 cm (5 ft 10 in)	79 kg (174 lb)	296 cm (9 ft 9 in)	273 cm (8 ft 11 in)	Cannes
21	Yana De Leeuw	6 September 1990	172 cm (5 ft 8 in)	68 kg (150 lb)	290 cm (9 ft 6 in)	265 cm (8 ft 8 in)	Hermes Oostende
22	Lisa Neyt	2 September 1993	176 cm (5 ft 9 in)	71 kg (157 lb)	0 cm (0 in)	0 cm (0 in)	VC Oudegem

== Brazil ==
- Head Coach:

The following is the Brazil roster in the 2014 FIVB World Grand Prix.

#	Name	Date of birth	Height	Weight	Spike	Block	Club
1	Fabiana Claudino	24 January 1985	193 cm (6 ft 4 in)	76 kg (168 lb)	314 cm (10 ft 4 in)	293 cm (9 ft 7 in)	SESI - SP
2	Juciely Cristina Barreto	18 December 1980	184 cm (6 ft 0 in)	71 kg (157 lb)	312 cm (10 ft 3 in)	289 cm (9 ft 6 in)	Rexona-Ades
3	Danielle Lins	5 January 1985	181 cm (5 ft 11 in)	68 kg (150 lb)	290 cm (9 ft 6 in)	276 cm (9 ft 1 in)	Molico/Nestlé
4	Ana Carolina da Silva	8 April 1991	183 cm (6 ft 0 in)	73 kg (161 lb)	290 cm (9 ft 6 in)	290 cm (9 ft 6 in)	Rexona-Ades
5	Adenizia da Silva	18 December 1986	185 cm (6 ft 1 in)	63 kg (139 lb)	312 cm (10 ft 3 in)	290 cm (9 ft 6 in)	Molico/Nestlé
6	Thaisa Menezes	15 May 1987	196 cm (6 ft 5 in)	79 kg (174 lb)	316 cm (10 ft 4 in)	301 cm (9 ft 11 in)	Molico/Nestlé
7	Andreia Laurence	26 April 1983	183 cm (6 ft 0 in)	76 kg (168 lb)	298 cm (9 ft 9 in)	288 cm (9 ft 5 in)	Unilever
8	Jaqueline Carvalho	31 December 1983	186 cm (6 ft 1 in)	70 kg (150 lb)	302 cm (9 ft 11 in)	286 cm (9 ft 5 in)	Minas Tênis Clube
9	Michelle Pavão	31 October 1986	178 cm (5 ft 10 in)	62 kg (137 lb)	295 cm (9 ft 8 in)	283 cm (9 ft 3 in)	BRASÍLIA VÔLEI
10	Gabriela Guimaraes	19 May 1994	176 cm (5 ft 9 in)	59 kg (130 lb)	295 cm (9 ft 8 in)	274 cm (9 ft 0 in)	Rexona-Ades
11	Tandara Caixeta	30 October 1988	184 cm (6 ft 0 in)	87 kg (192 lb)	305 cm (10 ft 0 in)	297 cm (9 ft 9 in)	BANANA BOAT/PRAIA CLUBE
12	Natalia Pereira	4 April 1989	183 cm (6 ft 0 in)	76 kg (168 lb)	300 cm (9 ft 10 in)	288 cm (9 ft 5 in)	Rexona-Ades
13	Sheilla Castro	1 July 1983	185 cm (6 ft 1 in)	64 kg (141 lb)	302 cm (9 ft 11 in)	284 cm (9 ft 4 in)	Vakifbank
14	Ana Tiemi	26 October 1987	187 cm (6 ft 2 in)	74 kg (163 lb)	295 cm (9 ft 8 in)	284 cm (9 ft 4 in)	Bursa B.B. SK
15	Monique Pavao	31 October 1986	178 cm (5 ft 10 in)	67 kg (148 lb)	294 cm (9 ft 8 in)	285 cm (9 ft 4 in)	SESI
16	Fernanda Garay	10 May 1986	179 cm (5 ft 10 in)	74 kg (163 lb)	308 cm (10 ft 1 in)	288 cm (9 ft 5 in)	Dinamo Krasnodar
17	Fabiola de Sousa	3 February 1983	184 cm (6 ft 0 in)	70 kg (150 lb)	300 cm (9 ft 10 in)	285 cm (9 ft 4 in)	Dinamo Krasnodar
18	Camila Brait	28 October 1988	170 cm (5 ft 7 in)	58 kg (128 lb)	271 cm (8 ft 11 in)	256 cm (8 ft 5 in)	Molico/Nestlé
19	Léia Silva	1 March 1985	169 cm (5 ft 7 in)	58 kg (128 lb)	268 cm (8 ft 10 in)	254 cm (8 ft 4 in)	Esporte Clube Pinheiros
20	Suelen Pinto	4 October 1987	166 cm (5 ft 5 in)	81 kg (179 lb)	256 cm (8 ft 5 in)	238 cm (7 ft 10 in)	SESI - SP
21	Angelica Malinverno	5 July 1989	189 cm (6 ft 2 in)	78 kg (172 lb)	295 cm (9 ft 8 in)	290 cm (9 ft 6 in)	BRASÍLIA VÔLEI
22	Suelle Oliveira	29 April 1987	187 cm (6 ft 2 in)	72 kg (159 lb)	291 cm (9 ft 7 in)	278 cm (9 ft 1 in)	SESI - SP

== Bulgaria ==
- Head Coach:

The following is the Bulgaria roster in the 2014 FIVB World Grand Prix.

#	Name	Date of birth	Height	Weight	Spike	Block	Club
1	Diana Nenova	16 April 1985	178 cm (5 ft 10 in)	70 kg (150 lb)	294 cm (9 ft 8 in)	298 cm (9 ft 9 in)	Schweriner
2	Desislava Nikolova	21 December 1991	184 cm (6 ft 0 in)	70 kg (150 lb)	290 cm (9 ft 6 in)	285 cm (9 ft 4 in)	Halkbank
3	Silvana Chausheva	19 May 1995	188 cm (6 ft 2 in)	75 kg (165 lb)	305 cm (10 ft 0 in)	290 cm (9 ft 6 in)	Maritza
4	Lora Kitipova	19 May 1991	184 cm (6 ft 0 in)	66 kg (146 lb)	290 cm (9 ft 6 in)	283 cm (9 ft 3 in)	Azeryol
5	Dobriana Rabadzhieva	14 June 1991	194 cm (6 ft 4 in)	72 kg (159 lb)	305 cm (10 ft 0 in)	285 cm (9 ft 4 in)	Volero
6	Tsvetelina Zarkova	18 December 1986	187 cm (6 ft 2 in)	69 kg (152 lb)	298 cm (9 ft 9 in)	289 cm (9 ft 6 in)	VC Dinamo Romprest
7	Tsvetelina Nikolova	23 September 1990	178 cm (5 ft 10 in)	62 kg (137 lb)	290 cm (9 ft 6 in)	285 cm (9 ft 4 in)	VC Vandoeuvre
8	Eva Yaneva	31 July 1985	186 cm (6 ft 1 in)	75 kg (165 lb)	298 cm (9 ft 9 in)	290 cm (9 ft 6 in)	C.S.M. Bucurest
9	Petya Barakova	18 June 1994	180 cm (5 ft 11 in)	76 kg (168 lb)	283 cm (9 ft 3 in)	271 cm (8 ft 11 in)	Levski
10	Kremena Kamenova	21 May 1988	185 cm (6 ft 1 in)	64 kg (141 lb)	304 cm (10 ft 0 in)	299 cm (9 ft 10 in)	VC Dorozhnik
11	Hristina Ruseva	1 October 1991	190 cm (6 ft 3 in)	77 kg (170 lb)	305 cm (10 ft 0 in)	290 cm (9 ft 6 in)	Nilufer Belediye
12	Viktoriya Grigorova	25 July 1990	189 cm (6 ft 2 in)	68 kg (150 lb)	296 cm (9 ft 9 in)	290 cm (9 ft 6 in)	Levski
13	Ivelina Monova	17 January 1986	173 cm (5 ft 8 in)	58 kg (128 lb)	285 cm (9 ft 4 in)	280 cm (9 ft 2 in)	VC Maritza
14	Slavina Koleva	22 November 1986	184 cm (6 ft 0 in)	57 kg (126 lb)	302 cm (9 ft 11 in)	297 cm (9 ft 9 in)	VC Karsiyaka
15	Nasya Dimitrova	6 November 1992	190 cm (6 ft 3 in)	70 kg (150 lb)	305 cm (10 ft 0 in)	290 cm (9 ft 6 in)	Azerrail
16	Elitsa Vasileva	13 May 1990	190 cm (6 ft 3 in)	73 kg (161 lb)	302 cm (9 ft 11 in)	290 cm (9 ft 6 in)	VakifBank
17	Strashimira Filipova	18 August 1985	195 cm (6 ft 5 in)	78 kg (172 lb)	307 cm (10 ft 1 in)	300 cm (9 ft 10 in)	VC Fakel
18	Emiliya Nikolova	26 December 1991	185 cm (6 ft 1 in)	59 kg (130 lb)	302 cm (9 ft 11 in)	287 cm (9 ft 5 in)	Imoco Volley SRL
19	Gabriela Tsvetanova	11 April 1991	185 cm (6 ft 1 in)	72 kg (159 lb)	295 cm (9 ft 8 in)	290 cm (9 ft 6 in)	CSU Targu Mures
20	Gergana Petrova	1 March 1990	183 cm (6 ft 0 in)	65 kg (143 lb)	290 cm (9 ft 6 in)	285 cm (9 ft 4 in)	VC Levski
21	Mira Todorova	12 April 1994	187 cm (6 ft 2 in)	70 kg (150 lb)	312 cm (10 ft 3 in)	300 cm (9 ft 10 in)	Sm'Aesch
22	Milena Dimova	7 May 1994	189 cm (6 ft 2 in)	61 kg (134 lb)	306 cm (10 ft 0 in)	295 cm (9 ft 8 in)	VC Maritza

== Canada ==
- Head Coach:

The following is the Canada roster in the 2014 FIVB World Grand Prix.

#	Name	Date of birth	Height	Weight	Spike	Block	Club
1	Janie Guimond	11 April 1984	165 cm (5 ft 5 in)	62 kg (137 lb)	288 cm (9 ft 5 in)	288 cm (9 ft 5 in)	Team Canada
2	Lisa Barclay	7 June 1992	188 cm (6 ft 2 in)	84 kg (185 lb)	316 cm (10 ft 4 in)	297 cm (9 ft 9 in)	University of British Columbia
3	Brittney Page	4 February 1984	184 cm (6 ft 0 in)	77 kg (170 lb)	309 cm (10 ft 2 in)	292 cm (9 ft 7 in)	Sichuan
4	Kyla Richey	20 June 1989	188 cm (6 ft 2 in)	83 kg (183 lb)	309 cm (10 ft 2 in)	292 cm (9 ft 7 in)	Azeryol Baku
5	Danielle Smith	29 April 1990	178 cm (5 ft 10 in)	68 kg (150 lb)	291 cm (9 ft 7 in)	277 cm (9 ft 1 in)	Sliedrecht Sport
6	Kelci French	28 January 1990	183 cm (6 ft 0 in)	73 kg (161 lb)	298 cm (9 ft 9 in)	279 cm (9 ft 2 in)	AEK Larnaca
7	Marie-Pier Murray-Methot	23 March 1986	185 cm (6 ft 1 in)	86 kg (190 lb)	307 cm (10 ft 1 in)	291 cm (9 ft 7 in)	VBC Val-de-Travers
8	Jaimie Thibeault	23 September 1989	188 cm (6 ft 2 in)	79 kg (174 lb)	302 cm (9 ft 11 in)	286 cm (9 ft 5 in)	Futura Volley S.S.D.R.L
9	Tabitha Love	11 September 1991	196 cm (6 ft 5 in)	85 kg (187 lb)	323 cm (10 ft 7 in)	307 cm (10 ft 1 in)	Azeryol Baku
10	Marisa Field	10 July 1987	189 cm (6 ft 2 in)	71 kg (157 lb)	312 cm (10 ft 3 in)	297 cm (9 ft 9 in)	Sagres NUC
11	Tesca Andrew-Wasylik	11 August 1990	173 cm (5 ft 8 in)	59 kg (130 lb)	292 cm (9 ft 7 in)	277 cm (9 ft 1 in)	STIINTA Bacau
13	Marie-Sophie Nadeau	10 October 1989	184 cm (6 ft 0 in)	84 kg (185 lb)	307 cm (10 ft 1 in)	292 cm (9 ft 7 in)	University of Montreal
14	Lucille Charuk	13 August 1989	188 cm (6 ft 2 in)	88 kg (194 lb)	315 cm (10 ft 4 in)	296 cm (9 ft 9 in)	VT Aurubis
15	Rebecca Pavan	17 April 1990	192 cm (6 ft 4 in)	67 kg (148 lb)	314 cm (10 ft 4 in)	300 cm (9 ft 10 in)	MKS Dabrowa Gornicza
16	Kelly Nyhof	26 June 1991	180 cm (5 ft 11 in)	81 kg (179 lb)	306 cm (10 ft 0 in)	292 cm (9 ft 7 in)	Team Canada
17	Megan Cyr	1 June 1990	182 cm (6 ft 0 in)	75 kg (165 lb)	297 cm (9 ft 9 in)	282 cm (9 ft 3 in)	Sagres NUC
18	Shanice Marcelle	28 May 1990	180 cm (5 ft 11 in)	67 kg (148 lb)	306 cm (10 ft 0 in)	286 cm (9 ft 5 in)	Volleyball Nantes
19	Jennifer Lundquist	9 October 1991	178 cm (5 ft 10 in)	76 kg (168 lb)	300 cm (9 ft 10 in)	284 cm (9 ft 4 in)	Team Canada
20	Dana Cranston	5 December 1991	191 cm (6 ft 3 in)	73 kg (161 lb)	317 cm (10 ft 5 in)	308 cm (10 ft 1 in)	VT Aurubis
21	Jennifer Cross	4 July 1992	195 cm (6 ft 5 in)	81 kg (179 lb)	315 cm (10 ft 4 in)	296 cm (9 ft 9 in)	Engelholms VS

== China ==
The following is the China roster in the 2014 FIVB World Grand Prix.

#	Name	Date of birth	Height	Weight	Spike	Block	Club
1	Yuan Xinyue	21 December 1996	199 cm (6 ft 6 in)	78 kg (172 lb)	317 cm (10 ft 5 in)	311 cm (10 ft 2 in)	Army
2	Zhu Ting	29 November 1994	195 cm (6 ft 5 in)	78 kg (172 lb)	327 cm (10 ft 9 in)	300 cm (9 ft 10 in)	Henan
3	Yang Fangxu	6 October 1994	190 cm (6 ft 3 in)	71 kg (157 lb)	308 cm (10 ft 1 in)	300 cm (9 ft 10 in)	Shandong
4	Yang Zhou	21 April 1992	187 cm (6 ft 2 in)	71 kg (157 lb)	308 cm (10 ft 1 in)	295 cm (9 ft 8 in)	Zhejiang
5	Shen Jingsi	3 May 1989	186 cm (6 ft 1 in)	75 kg (165 lb)	305 cm (10 ft 0 in)	294 cm (9 ft 8 in)	Army
6	Yang Junjing	15 May 1989	190 cm (6 ft 3 in)	70 kg (150 lb)	308 cm (10 ft 1 in)	300 cm (9 ft 10 in)	Army
7	Wei Qiuyue	26 September 1988	182 cm (6 ft 0 in)	65 kg (143 lb)	305 cm (10 ft 0 in)	300 cm (9 ft 10 in)	Tianjin
8	Zeng Chunlei	3 November 1989	187 cm (6 ft 2 in)	67 kg (148 lb)	315 cm (10 ft 4 in)	315 cm (10 ft 4 in)	Beijing
9	Liu Xiaotong	16 February 1990	188 cm (6 ft 2 in)	70 kg (150 lb)	312 cm (10 ft 3 in)	300 cm (9 ft 10 in)	Beijing
10	Shan Danna	8 October 1991	168 cm (5 ft 6 in)	60 kg (130 lb)	290 cm (9 ft 6 in)	285 cm (9 ft 4 in)	Zhejiang
11	Xu Yunli	2 August 1987	195 cm (6 ft 5 in)	75 kg (165 lb)	325 cm (10 ft 8 in)	306 cm (10 ft 0 in)	Fujian
12	Hui Ruoqi	4 March 1991	192 cm (6 ft 4 in)	78 kg (172 lb)	315 cm (10 ft 4 in)	305 cm (10 ft 0 in)	Jiangsu Volleyball Club
13	Yao Di	15 August 1992	182 cm (6 ft 0 in)	65 kg (143 lb)	306 cm (10 ft 0 in)	298 cm (9 ft 9 in)	Tianjin
14	Qiao Ting	2 March 1992	189 cm (6 ft 2 in)	66 kg (146 lb)	315 cm (10 ft 4 in)	315 cm (10 ft 4 in)	Beijing
15	Chen Zhan	11 October 1990	180 cm (5 ft 11 in)	65 kg (143 lb)	300 cm (9 ft 10 in)	295 cm (9 ft 8 in)	Jiangsu
16	Wang Huimin	11 November 1992	184 cm (6 ft 0 in)	65 kg (143 lb)	305 cm (10 ft 0 in)	298 cm (9 ft 9 in)	Zhejiang
17	Wang Na	25 February 1990	178 cm (5 ft 10 in)	63 kg (139 lb)	305 cm (10 ft 0 in)	295 cm (9 ft 8 in)	Zhejiang
18	Ding Xia	13 January 1990	180 cm (5 ft 11 in)	61 kg (134 lb)	305 cm (10 ft 0 in)	300 cm (9 ft 10 in)	Liaoning
19	Li Jing	9 August 1991	186 cm (6 ft 1 in)	73 kg (161 lb)	310 cm (10 ft 2 in)	295 cm (9 ft 8 in)	Zhejiang
20	Liu Yanhan	19 January 1993	188 cm (6 ft 2 in)	75 kg (165 lb)	315 cm (10 ft 4 in)	305 cm (10 ft 0 in)	Army
21	Zhu Linfen	8 November 1989	181 cm (5 ft 11 in)	65 kg (143 lb)	305 cm (10 ft 0 in)	294 cm (9 ft 8 in)	Army

== Croatia ==
- Head Coach:

The following is the Croatia roster in the 2014 FIVB World Grand Prix.

#	Name	Date of birth	Height	Weight	Spike	Block	Club
1	Senna Ušic Jogunica	14 May 1986	191 cm (6 ft 3 in)	78 kg (172 lb)	302 cm (9 ft 11 in)	292 cm (9 ft 7 in)	Eczacibasi Vitra (TUR)
2	Ana Grbac	23 March 1988	186 cm (6 ft 1 in)	64 kg (141 lb)	302 cm (9 ft 11 in)	288 cm (9 ft 5 in)	Volero Zürich
3	Nikolina Božičević	14 January 1995	160 cm (5 ft 3 in)	60 kg (130 lb)	265 cm (8 ft 8 in)	260 cm (8 ft 6 in)	HAOK Mladost Zagreb (CRO)
4	Nikolina Jelić	9 November 1991	188 cm (6 ft 2 in)	69 kg (152 lb)	254 cm (8 ft 4 in)	250 cm (8 ft 2 in)	SC Potsdam (GER)
5	Antonija Kaleb	2 April 1986	188 cm (6 ft 2 in)	71 kg (157 lb)	305 cm (10 ft 0 in)	289 cm (9 ft 6 in)	Jakarta BNI 46 (INA)
6	Mira Topić	2 June 1983	184 cm (6 ft 0 in)	72 kg (159 lb)	300 cm (9 ft 10 in)	284 cm (9 ft 4 in)	Tyumen (RUS)
7	Bernarda Ćutuk	22 December 1990	186 cm (6 ft 1 in)	76 kg (168 lb)	317 cm (10 ft 5 in)	300 cm (9 ft 10 in)	SC Potsdam (GER)
8	Mia Jerkov	5 December 1982	192 cm (6 ft 4 in)	68 kg (150 lb)	310 cm (10 ft 2 in)	295 cm (9 ft 8 in)	Bursa Buyuksehir (TUR)
9	Matea Ikić	25 May 1989	185 cm (6 ft 1 in)	79 kg (174 lb)	290 cm (9 ft 6 in)	278 cm (9 ft 1 in)	Pallavolo Ornavasso (ITA)
10	Ivana Miloš	7 March 1986	187 cm (6 ft 2 in)	70 kg (150 lb)	312 cm (10 ft 3 in)	296 cm (9 ft 9 in)	Agil Volley (ITA)
11	Sanja Popović	31 May 1984	186 cm (6 ft 1 in)	76 kg (168 lb)	291 cm (9 ft 7 in)	283 cm (9 ft 3 in)	Dinamo Moscow (RUS)
12	Iva Jurišić	24 March 1994	186 cm (6 ft 1 in)	69 kg (152 lb)	300 cm (9 ft 10 in)	290 cm (9 ft 6 in)	HAOK Mladost Zagreb (CRO)
13	Samanta Fabris	8 February 1992	188 cm (6 ft 2 in)	79 kg (174 lb)	322 cm (10 ft 7 in)	306 cm (10 ft 0 in)	Liu Jo Volley (ITA)
14	Karla Klarić	5 September 1994	188 cm (6 ft 2 in)	86 kg (190 lb)	310 cm (10 ft 2 in)	300 cm (9 ft 10 in)	Volero Zürich (SUI)
15	Bernarda Brčić	12 May 1991	192 cm (6 ft 4 in)	81 kg (179 lb)	305 cm (10 ft 0 in)	297 cm (9 ft 9 in)	Robur Tiboni Volley (ITA)
16	Nikolina Kovačić	30 April 1986	180 cm (5 ft 11 in)	74 kg (163 lb)	310 cm (10 ft 2 in)	293 cm (9 ft 7 in)	Rota Koleji (TUR)
17	Jelena Alajbeg	1 October 1989	183 cm (6 ft 0 in)	75 kg (165 lb)	310 cm (10 ft 2 in)	300 cm (9 ft 10 in)	Iller Bankasi (TUR)
18	Maja Poljak	2 May 1983	194 cm (6 ft 4 in)	80 kg (180 lb)	305 cm (10 ft 0 in)	300 cm (9 ft 10 in)	Eczacibasi VitrA Istanbul
19	Lucija Mlinar	6 May 1995	180 cm (5 ft 11 in)	65 kg (143 lb)	290 cm (9 ft 6 in)	284 cm (9 ft 4 in)	HAOK Mladost Zagreb (CRO)
20	Tamara Sušić	28 November 1990	192 cm (6 ft 4 in)	76 kg (168 lb)	305 cm (10 ft 0 in)	300 cm (9 ft 10 in)	HAOK Mladost Zagreb (CRO)
21	Marija Ušić	5 February 1992	185 cm (6 ft 1 in)	67 kg (148 lb)	292 cm (9 ft 7 in)	278 cm (9 ft 1 in)	Amiens (FRA)
22	Biljana Gligorović	31 January 1982	183 cm (6 ft 0 in)	68 kg (150 lb)	298 cm (9 ft 9 in)	292 cm (9 ft 7 in)	Vrilission (GRE)

== Czech Republic ==
- Head Coach:

The following is the Czech Republic roster in the 2014 FIVB World Grand Prix.

#	Name	Date of birth	Height	Weight	Spike	Block	Club
1	Andrea Kossanyiova	6 August 1993	186 cm (6 ft 1 in)	72 kg (159 lb)	310 cm (10 ft 2 in)	300 cm (9 ft 10 in)	VK Prostejov
2	Eva Hodanova	18 December 1993	189 cm (6 ft 2 in)	75 kg (165 lb)	306 cm (10 ft 0 in)	298 cm (9 ft 9 in)	PVK Olymp Praha
3	Veronika Trnkova	13 October 1995	188 cm (6 ft 2 in)	88 kg (194 lb)	314 cm (10 ft 4 in)	300 cm (9 ft 10 in)	PVK Olymp Praha
4	Aneta Havlickova	3 July 1987	190 cm (6 ft 3 in)	96 kg (212 lb)	316 cm (10 ft 4 in)	300 cm (9 ft 10 in)	Lokomotiv Baku
5	Klara Vyklicka	3 June 1993	184 cm (6 ft 0 in)	67 kg (148 lb)	310 cm (10 ft 2 in)	300 cm (9 ft 10 in)	VK Kralovo Pole
6	Lucie Smutna	14 April 1991	180 cm (5 ft 11 in)	75 kg (165 lb)	307 cm (10 ft 1 in)	285 cm (9 ft 4 in)	Ass. Volley Soverato
7	Marketa Chlumska	10 February 1982	177 cm (5 ft 10 in)	62 kg (137 lb)	295 cm (9 ft 8 in)	279 cm (9 ft 2 in)	VK Kralovo Pole
8	Michaela Mlejnkova	26 July 1996	184 cm (6 ft 0 in)	70 kg (150 lb)	305 cm (10 ft 0 in)	298 cm (9 ft 9 in)	PVK Olymp Praha
9	Eva Rutarova	14 September 1989	198 cm (6 ft 6 in)	93 kg (205 lb)	317 cm (10 ft 5 in)	305 cm (10 ft 0 in)	SK UP Olomouc
10	Michala Kvapilova	8 February 1990	183 cm (6 ft 0 in)	65 kg (143 lb)	308 cm (10 ft 1 in)	299 cm (9 ft 10 in)	PVK Olymp Praha
11	Veronika Dostalova	7 April 1992	170 cm (5 ft 7 in)	67 kg (148 lb)	278 cm (9 ft 1 in)	269 cm (8 ft 10 in)	PVK Olymp Praha
12	Iveta Halbichova	19 December 1989	178 cm (5 ft 10 in)	67 kg (148 lb)	285 cm (9 ft 4 in)	280 cm (9 ft 2 in)	PVK Olymp Praha
13	Tereza Vanzurova	4 April 1991	184 cm (6 ft 0 in)	76 kg (168 lb)	300 cm (9 ft 10 in)	269 cm (8 ft 10 in)	Pallavolo Scandicci-SDB SSDRL
14	Nikol Sajdova	20 July 1988	185 cm (6 ft 1 in)	79 kg (174 lb)	298 cm (9 ft 9 in)	295 cm (9 ft 8 in)	Rote Raben Vilsbiburg
15	Marie Kurkova	20 May 1996	181 cm (5 ft 11 in)	75 kg (165 lb)	290 cm (9 ft 6 in)	284 cm (9 ft 4 in)	PVK Olymp Praha
16	Helena Havelkova	25 July 1988	186 cm (6 ft 1 in)	70 kg (150 lb)	320 cm (10 ft 6 in)	300 cm (9 ft 10 in)	Yamamay Busto Arsizio
17	Kamila Spacilova	9 October 1988	174 cm (5 ft 9 in)	63 kg (139 lb)	276 cm (9 ft 1 in)	276 cm (9 ft 1 in)	TJ Sokol Frydek-Mistek
18	Pavla Vincourova	12 November 1992	180 cm (5 ft 11 in)	68 kg (150 lb)	297 cm (9 ft 9 in)	290 cm (9 ft 6 in)	Pallavolo Scandicci-SDB SSDRL
19	Sona Mikyskova	2 May 1989	189 cm (6 ft 2 in)	79 kg (174 lb)	305 cm (10 ft 0 in)	300 cm (9 ft 10 in)	Pays D´aix Venelles VB
20	Ivana Cebakova	7 August 1986	176 cm (5 ft 9 in)	67 kg (148 lb)	295 cm (9 ft 8 in)	260 cm (8 ft 6 in)	VK Kralovo Pole
22	Zuzana Mudrova	30 January 1993	186 cm (6 ft 1 in)	80 kg (180 lb)	303 cm (9 ft 11 in)	300 cm (9 ft 10 in)	PVK Olymp Praha

== Cuba ==
- Head Coach:

The following is the Cuba roster in the 2014 FIVB World Grand Prix.

#	Name	Date of birth	Height	Weight	Spike	Block	Club
1	Mercedes Alvarez Fernandez	15 May 1996	187 cm (6 ft 2 in)	79 kg (174 lb)	315 cm (10 ft 4 in)	300 cm (9 ft 10 in)	S.Cuba
2	Regla Rainierys Gracia Gonzalez	28 May 1993	177 cm (5 ft 10 in)	67 kg (148 lb)	301 cm (9 ft 11 in)	282 cm (9 ft 3 in)	Camaguey
3	Alena Rojas Orta	9 August 1992	186 cm (6 ft 1 in)	76 kg (168 lb)	320 cm (10 ft 6 in)	305 cm (10 ft 0 in)	Habana
4	Melissa Teresa Vargas Abreu	16 October 1999	184 cm (6 ft 0 in)	78 kg (172 lb)	244 cm (8 ft 0 in)	242 cm (7 ft 11 in)	Cienfuegos
5	Yamila Hernandez Santas	8 November 1992	182 cm (6 ft 0 in)	69 kg (152 lb)	301 cm (9 ft 11 in)	285 cm (9 ft 4 in)	La Habana
6	Daymara Lescay Cajigal	5 September 1992	184 cm (6 ft 0 in)	72 kg (159 lb)	308 cm (10 ft 1 in)	290 cm (9 ft 6 in)	Guantanamo
7	Claudia Hernandez Aguila	9 January 1997	181 cm (5 ft 11 in)	78 kg (172 lb)	225 cm (7 ft 5 in)	223 cm (7 ft 4 in)	La Habana
8	Sonia Beatriz Romero Espinosa	2 August 1997	183 cm (6 ft 0 in)	70 kg (150 lb)	301 cm (9 ft 11 in)	288 cm (9 ft 5 in)	La Habana
9	Dayessi Luis Ruiz	23 October 1996	170 cm (5 ft 7 in)	60 kg (130 lb)	288 cm (9 ft 5 in)	248 cm (8 ft 2 in)	Camaguey
10	Emily Borrell Cruz	19 February 1992	167 cm (5 ft 6 in)	55 kg (121 lb)	270 cm (8 ft 10 in)	260 cm (8 ft 6 in)	Villa Clara
11	Gretell Elena Moreno Borrero	30 January 1998	183 cm (6 ft 0 in)	68 kg (150 lb)	287 cm (9 ft 5 in)	280 cm (9 ft 2 in)	Granma
12	Dairilys Margarita Cruz Perez	12 September 1990	183 cm (6 ft 0 in)	65 kg (143 lb)	310 cm (10 ft 2 in)	305 cm (10 ft 0 in)	Villa Clara
13	Rosanna Giel Ramos	10 June 1992	187 cm (6 ft 2 in)	62 kg (137 lb)	320 cm (10 ft 6 in)	315 cm (10 ft 4 in)	Ciego de Avila
14	Dayami Sanchez Savon	14 March 1994	188 cm (6 ft 2 in)	64 kg (141 lb)	314 cm (10 ft 4 in)	302 cm (9 ft 11 in)	Ciudad Habana
15	Beatriz Vilches Santana	29 January 1995	182 cm (6 ft 0 in)	68 kg (150 lb)	288 cm (9 ft 5 in)	277 cm (9 ft 1 in)	Cienfuegos
16	Yelennis Diaz Cairo	14 October 1995	189 cm (6 ft 2 in)	71 kg (157 lb)	300 cm (9 ft 10 in)	298 cm (9 ft 9 in)	Villa Clara
17	Heidy Casanova Alvarez	6 November 1998	184 cm (6 ft 0 in)	78 kg (172 lb)	244 cm (8 ft 0 in)	240 cm (7 ft 10 in)	La Habana
18	Sulian Caridad Matienzo Linares	14 December 1994	178 cm (5 ft 10 in)	75 kg (165 lb)	232 cm (7 ft 7 in)	230 cm (7 ft 7 in)	La Habana
19	Jennifer Yanet Alvarez Hernandez	19 November 1993	184 cm (6 ft 0 in)	72 kg (159 lb)	310 cm (10 ft 2 in)	294 cm (9 ft 8 in)	Cienfuegos
20	Heidy Margarita Rodriguez Lopez	24 June 1993	187 cm (6 ft 2 in)	66 kg (146 lb)	312 cm (10 ft 3 in)	308 cm (10 ft 1 in)	Villa Clara

== Dominican Republic ==
- Head Coach: (Brazil) Marcos Kwiek

The following is the Dominican Republic roster in the 2014 FIVB World Grand Prix.

#	Name	Date of birth	Height	Weight	Spike	Block	Club
1	Annerys Victoria Vargas Valdez	7 August 1981	196 cm (6 ft 5 in)	70 kg (150 lb)	327 cm (10 ft 9 in)	320 cm (10 ft 6 in)	Seleccion Nacional
2	Winifer Maria Fernandez Perez	6 January 1995	169 cm (5 ft 7 in)	62 kg (137 lb)	270 cm (8 ft 10 in)	265 cm (8 ft 8 in)	Cien Fuego
3	Camil Inmaculada Dominguez Martinez	7 December 1991	176 cm (5 ft 9 in)	75 kg (165 lb)	232 cm (7 ft 7 in)	275 cm (9 ft 0 in)	Mirador
4	Marianne Fersola Norberto	16 January 1992	191 cm (6 ft 3 in)	60 kg (130 lb)	315 cm (10 ft 4 in)	310 cm (10 ft 2 in)	Mirador
5	Brenda Castillo	5 June 1992	167 cm (5 ft 6 in)	55 kg (121 lb)	245 cm (8 ft 0 in)	230 cm (7 ft 7 in)	San Cristobal
6	Gaila Ceneida Gonzalez Lopez	25 June 1997	188 cm (6 ft 2 in)	73 kg (161 lb)	304 cm (10 ft 0 in)	276 cm (9 ft 1 in)	Mirador
7	Niverka Dharlenis Marte Frica	19 October 1990	178 cm (5 ft 10 in)	71 kg (157 lb)	295 cm (9 ft 8 in)	283 cm (9 ft 3 in)	Deportivo Nacional
8	Candida Estefany Arias Perez	11 March 1992	194 cm (6 ft 4 in)	68 kg (150 lb)	320 cm (10 ft 6 in)	315 cm (10 ft 4 in)	San Cristobal
9	Sidarka De Los Milagros Nuñez	25 June 1984	185 cm (6 ft 1 in)	62 kg (137 lb)	330 cm (10 ft 10 in)	320 cm (10 ft 6 in)	Club Malanga
10	Pamela Marie Soriano Olivo	30 June 1995	175 cm (5 ft 9 in)	64 kg (141 lb)	290 cm (9 ft 6 in)	287 cm (9 ft 5 in)	Mirador
11	Marifranchi Rodriguez	29 August 1990	184 cm (6 ft 0 in)	68 kg (150 lb)	310 cm (10 ft 2 in)	300 cm (9 ft 10 in)	Mirador
12	Rosalin Angeles Rojas	23 July 1985	189 cm (6 ft 2 in)	61 kg (134 lb)	310 cm (10 ft 2 in)	300 cm (9 ft 10 in)	Deportivo Nacional
13	Erasma Moreno Martinez	25 November 1991	183 cm (6 ft 0 in)	75 kg (165 lb)	289 cm (9 ft 6 in)	304 cm (10 ft 0 in)	Monte Plata
14	Prisilla Rivera Brens	29 December 1984	183 cm (6 ft 0 in)	67 kg (148 lb)	309 cm (10 ft 2 in)	305 cm (10 ft 0 in)	San Pedro
15	Celenia Toribio De Leon	17 July 1994	181 cm (5 ft 11 in)	69 kg (152 lb)	290 cm (9 ft 6 in)	286 cm (9 ft 5 in)	Cien Fuego
16	Yonkaira Paola Peña Isabel	10 May 1993	190 cm (6 ft 3 in)	70 kg (150 lb)	320 cm (10 ft 6 in)	310 cm (10 ft 2 in)	Mirador
17	Gina Altagracia Mambru Casilla	21 January 1986	182 cm (6 ft 0 in)	65 kg (143 lb)	330 cm (10 ft 10 in)	315 cm (10 ft 4 in)	Los Cachorros
18	Bethania De La Cruz De Peña	13 May 1987	188 cm (6 ft 2 in)	70 kg (150 lb)	330 cm (10 ft 10 in)	320 cm (10 ft 6 in)	Deportivo Nacional
19	Ana Yorkira Binet Stephens	9 February 1992	174 cm (5 ft 9 in)	58 kg (128 lb)	280 cm (9 ft 2 in)	260 cm (8 ft 6 in)	Samana
20	Brayelin Elizabeth Martinez	11 September 1996	201 cm (6 ft 7 in)	83 kg (183 lb)	330 cm (10 ft 10 in)	320 cm (10 ft 6 in)	Deportivo Nacional

== Germany ==
- Head Coach:

The following is the Germany roster in the 2014 FIVB World Grand Prix.

#	Name	Date of birth	Height	Weight	Spike	Block	Club
1	Lenka Dürr	10 December 1990	171 cm (5 ft 7 in)	59 kg (130 lb)	280 cm (9 ft 2 in)	270 cm (8 ft 10 in)	Azeryol Baku
2	Kathleen Weiß	2 February 1984	171 cm (5 ft 7 in)	66 kg (146 lb)	290 cm (9 ft 6 in)	273 cm (8 ft 11 in)	Agel Prostejov
3	Louisa Lippmann	23 September 1994	191 cm (6 ft 3 in)	78 kg (172 lb)	319 cm (10 ft 6 in)	312 cm (10 ft 3 in)	Dresdner SC
4	Maren Brinker	10 July 1986	184 cm (6 ft 0 in)	68 kg (150 lb)	303 cm (9 ft 11 in)	295 cm (9 ft 8 in)	Montichiari Volley
5	Leonie Schwertmann	12 January 1994	190 cm (6 ft 3 in)	80 kg (180 lb)	300 cm (9 ft 10 in)	290 cm (9 ft 6 in)	USC Münster
6	Jennifer Geerties	5 April 1994	184 cm (6 ft 0 in)	58 kg (128 lb)	298 cm (9 ft 9 in)	288 cm (9 ft 5 in)	Schweriner SC
7	Jana Franziska Poll	7 May 1988	185 cm (6 ft 1 in)	69 kg (152 lb)	310 cm (10 ft 2 in)	290 cm (9 ft 6 in)	Schweriner SC
8	Berit Kauffeldt	8 July 1990	190 cm (6 ft 3 in)	75 kg (165 lb)	311 cm (10 ft 2 in)	294 cm (9 ft 8 in)	Impel Wroclaw/POL
9	Stefanie Karg	22 October 1986	189 cm (6 ft 2 in)	71 kg (157 lb)	314 cm (10 ft 4 in)	299 cm (9 ft 10 in)	Agel Prostejov
10	Lena Stigrot	20 December 1994	184 cm (6 ft 0 in)	68 kg (150 lb)	303 cm (9 ft 11 in)	295 cm (9 ft 8 in)	Rote Raben Vilsbiburg
11	Christiane Fürst	29 March 1985	193 cm (6 ft 4 in)	80 kg (180 lb)	323 cm (10 ft 7 in)	307 cm (10 ft 1 in)	Eczasibasi Istanbul
12	Heike Beier	9 December 1983	184 cm (6 ft 0 in)	73 kg (161 lb)	305 cm (10 ft 0 in)	293 cm (9 ft 7 in)	BKF Aluprof Bielsko Biala
13	Jennifer Pettke	29 May 1989	187 cm (6 ft 2 in)	71 kg (157 lb)	302 cm (9 ft 11 in)	290 cm (9 ft 6 in)	VC Wiesbaden
14	Margareta Kozuch	30 October 1986	187 cm (6 ft 2 in)	70 kg (150 lb)	309 cm (10 ft 2 in)	297 cm (9 ft 9 in)	RebecchiNordameccanica Piacenz
15	Lisa Thomsen	20 August 1985	172 cm (5 ft 8 in)	68 kg (150 lb)	290 cm (9 ft 6 in)	285 cm (9 ft 4 in)	Lokomotiv Baku
16	Lena Möllers	6 January 1990	188 cm (6 ft 2 in)	74 kg (163 lb)	312 cm (10 ft 3 in)	297 cm (9 ft 9 in)	Neruda Volley Bolzano
17	Carina Aulenbrock	22 September 1994	190 cm (6 ft 3 in)	80 kg (180 lb)	310 cm (10 ft 2 in)	291 cm (9 ft 7 in)	Schweriner SC
18	Wiebke Silge	16 July 1996	190 cm (6 ft 3 in)	75 kg (165 lb)	302 cm (9 ft 11 in)	291 cm (9 ft 7 in)	USC Münster
19	Laura Weihenmaier	4 April 1991	180 cm (5 ft 11 in)	70 kg (150 lb)	297 cm (9 ft 9 in)	286 cm (9 ft 5 in)	Schweriner SC
20	Mareen Apitz	26 March 1987	183 cm (6 ft 0 in)	73 kg (161 lb)	295 cm (9 ft 8 in)	284 cm (9 ft 4 in)	RC Cannes
21	Lisa Izquierdo	29 August 1994	178 cm (5 ft 10 in)	78 kg (172 lb)	309 cm (10 ft 2 in)	294 cm (9 ft 8 in)	Dresdner SC
22	Anja Brandt	15 February 1990	195 cm (6 ft 5 in)	77 kg (170 lb)	310 cm (10 ft 2 in)	295 cm (9 ft 8 in)	Schweriner SC

== Italy ==
- Head Coach:

The following is the Italy roster in the 2014 FIVB World Grand Prix.

#	Name	Date of birth	Height	Weight	Spike	Block	Club
1	Indre Sorokaite	2 July 1988	188 cm (6 ft 2 in)	80 kg (180 lb)	300 cm (9 ft 10 in)	280 cm (9 ft 2 in)	Fenerbahce Istanbul
2	Sara Loda	22 August 1990	178 cm (5 ft 10 in)	75 kg (165 lb)	308 cm (10 ft 1 in)	287 cm (9 ft 5 in)	Foppapedretti Bergamo
3	Noemi Signorile	15 February 1990	182 cm (6 ft 0 in)	70 kg (150 lb)	294 cm (9 ft 8 in)	290 cm (9 ft 6 in)	Igor Volley Novara
4	Sara Bonifacio	3 July 1996	188 cm (6 ft 2 in)	76 kg (168 lb)	320 cm (10 ft 6 in)	300 cm (9 ft 10 in)	Igor Volley Novara
5	Valentina Fiorin	9 October 1984	184 cm (6 ft 0 in)	82 kg (181 lb)	320 cm (10 ft 6 in)	310 cm (10 ft 2 in)	Imoco Volley Conegliano
6	Monica De Gennaro	8 January 1987	174 cm (5 ft 9 in)	67 kg (148 lb)	292 cm (9 ft 7 in)	270 cm (8 ft 10 in)	Imoco Conegliano
7	Raphaela Folie	7 March 1991	186 cm (6 ft 1 in)	82 kg (181 lb)	307 cm (10 ft 1 in)	283 cm (9 ft 3 in)	Liu Jo Modena
8	Enrica Merlo	28 December 1988	170 cm (5 ft 7 in)	60 kg (130 lb)	281 cm (9 ft 3 in)	262 cm (8 ft 7 in)	Foppapedretti Bergamo
9	Nadia Centoni	19 June 1981	182 cm (6 ft 0 in)	63 kg (139 lb)	307 cm (10 ft 1 in)	291 cm (9 ft 7 in)	Galatasaray Istanbul
10	Francesca Ferretti	15 February 1984	180 cm (5 ft 11 in)	70 kg (150 lb)	296 cm (9 ft 9 in)	280 cm (9 ft 2 in)	Rabita Baku
11	Cristina Chirichella	10 February 1994	195 cm (6 ft 5 in)	73 kg (161 lb)	314 cm (10 ft 4 in)	296 cm (9 ft 9 in)	Igor Volley Novara
12	Francesca Piccinini	10 January 1979	184 cm (6 ft 0 in)	71 kg (157 lb)	304 cm (10 ft 0 in)	279 cm (9 ft 2 in)	Liu Jo Modena
13	Valentina Arrighetti	26 January 1985	185 cm (6 ft 1 in)	72 kg (159 lb)	318 cm (10 ft 5 in)	310 cm (10 ft 2 in)	Lokomotiv Baku
14	Caterina Bosetti	2 February 1994	179 cm (5 ft 10 in)	59 kg (130 lb)	299 cm (9 ft 10 in)	281 cm (9 ft 3 in)	Galatasaray Istanbul
15	Antonella Del Core	5 November 1980	180 cm (5 ft 11 in)	75 kg (165 lb)	302 cm (9 ft 11 in)	278 cm (9 ft 1 in)	Dinamo-Kazan
16	Lucia Bosetti	9 July 1989	175 cm (5 ft 9 in)	65 kg (143 lb)	316 cm (10 ft 4 in)	286 cm (9 ft 5 in)	Nordmeccanica Piacenza
17	Valentina Diouf	10 January 1993	202 cm (6 ft 8 in)	94 kg (207 lb)	320 cm (10 ft 6 in)	303 cm (9 ft 11 in)	Yamamay Busto Arsizio
18	Floriana Bertone	19 November 1992	202 cm (6 ft 8 in)	80 kg (180 lb)	316 cm (10 ft 4 in)	300 cm (9 ft 10 in)	Il Bisonte San Casciano
19	Ofelia Malinov	29 February 1996	183 cm (6 ft 0 in)	70 kg (150 lb)	301 cm (9 ft 11 in)	282 cm (9 ft 3 in)	Brunopremi.Com Bassano
20	Stefania Sansonna	1 November 1982	175 cm (5 ft 9 in)	68 kg (150 lb)	298 cm (9 ft 9 in)	276 cm (9 ft 1 in)	Igor Volley Novara
21	Taismary Aguero	5 March 1977	177 cm (5 ft 10 in)	69 kg (152 lb)	322 cm (10 ft 7 in)	300 cm (9 ft 10 in)	MG Carnaghi Villa Cortese
22	Serena Ortolani	7 January 1987	187 cm (6 ft 2 in)	63 kg (139 lb)	308 cm (10 ft 1 in)	288 cm (9 ft 5 in)	Pomì Casalmaggiore

== Japan ==
- Head Coach: (Japan) Masayoshi Manabe

#	Name	Date of birth	Height	Weight	Spike	Block	Club
1	Miyu Nagaoka	25/7/1991	179	65	310	295	Hisamitsu Springs
2	Hitomi Nakamichi	18/9/1985	159	53	270	256	Toray Arrows
3	Saori Kimura	19/8/1986	185	65	304	293	Toray Arrows
4	Arisa Takada	17/2/1987	175	64	290	275	Toray Arrows
5	Arisa Sato	18/7/1989	164	53	275	268	Hitachi Rivale
6	Yuko Sano	26/7/1979	159	54	260	250	Denso Airybees
7	Mai Yamaguchi	3/7/1983	176	62	302	290	Okayama Seagulls
8	Riho Ōtake	23/12/1993	183	65	306	290	Denso Airybees
9	Mizuho Ishida	22/1/1988	174	67	301	280	Denso Airybees
10	Nana Iwasaka	3/7/1990	187	72	300	285	Hisamitsu Springs
11	Yūka Imamura	2/9/1993	177	70	296	286	Aoyama Gakuin University
12	Yuki Ishii	8/5/1991	180	68	303	286	Hisamitsu Springs
13	Risa Shinnabe	11/7/1990	173	66	295	268	Hisamitsu Springs
14	Yukiko Ebata	7/11/1989	176	67	305	298	RC Cannes
15	Natsumi Fujita	5/8/1991	166	50	277	268	Toyota Auto Body Queenseis
16	Saori Sakoda	18/12/1987	175	64	305	279	Toray Arrows
17	Kana Ōno	30/6/1992	180	70	297	283	NEC Red Rockets
18	Sayaka Tsutsui	29/9/1992	157	54	260	250	Hisamitsu Springs
19	Haruka Miyashita	1/9/1994	177	61	298	272	Okayama Seagulls
20	Mami Uchiseto	25/10/1991	170	69	296	285	Hitachi Rivale
21	Arisa Inoue	8/5/1995	178	65	297	287	University of Tsukuba
22	Miyuki Hiramatsu	22/11/1991	181	66	297	287	Toyota Auto Body Queenseis

== Kazakhstan ==
- Head Coach:

The following is the Kazakhstan roster in the 2014 FIVB World Grand Prix.

#	Name	Date of birth	Height	Weight	Spike	Block	Club
1	Tatyana Mudritskaya	17 January 1985	195 cm (6 ft 5 in)	77 kg (170 lb)	310 cm (10 ft 2 in)	300 cm (9 ft 10 in)	Apollon Limassoll
2	Lyudmila Issayeva	26 September 1989	184 cm (6 ft 0 in)	70 kg (150 lb)	295 cm (9 ft 8 in)	280 cm (9 ft 2 in)	ALMATY
3	Sana Anarkulova	21 July 1989	188 cm (6 ft 2 in)	77 kg (170 lb)	300 cm (9 ft 10 in)	280 cm (9 ft 2 in)	ALMATY
4	Lyudmila Anarbayeva	12 November 1983	192 cm (6 ft 4 in)	72 kg (159 lb)	305 cm (10 ft 0 in)	299 cm (9 ft 10 in)	Zhetyssu
5	Olga Nassedkina	28 December 1982	190 cm (6 ft 3 in)	75 kg (165 lb)	305 cm (10 ft 0 in)	255 cm (8 ft 4 in)	ZHETYSSU
6	Natalya Akilova	31 May 1993	183 cm (6 ft 0 in)	62 kg (137 lb)	295 cm (9 ft 8 in)	275 cm (9 ft 0 in)	KARAGANDA
7	Alena Ivanova	19 June 1989	195 cm (6 ft 5 in)	78 kg (172 lb)	310 cm (10 ft 2 in)	300 cm (9 ft 10 in)	Zhetyssu
8	Korinna Ishimtseva	8 February 1984	187 cm (6 ft 2 in)	69 kg (152 lb)	300 cm (9 ft 10 in)	280 cm (9 ft 2 in)	Zhetyssu
9	Irina Lukomskaya	19 March 1991	176 cm (5 ft 9 in)	66 kg (146 lb)	280 cm (9 ft 2 in)	270 cm (8 ft 10 in)	Voronezh
10	Irina Shenberger	20 February 1992	180 cm (5 ft 11 in)	73 kg (161 lb)	290 cm (9 ft 6 in)	280 cm (9 ft 2 in)	Astana
11	Marina Storozhenko	6 June 1985	175 cm (5 ft 9 in)	57 kg (126 lb)	290 cm (9 ft 6 in)	280 cm (9 ft 2 in)	Zhetyssu
12	Inna German	17 January 1983	182 cm (6 ft 0 in)	75 kg (165 lb)	300 cm (9 ft 10 in)	280 cm (9 ft 2 in)	Karaganda
13	Radmila Beresneva	6 June 1983	185 cm (6 ft 1 in)	70 kg (150 lb)	300 cm (9 ft 10 in)	295 cm (9 ft 8 in)	Irtysh-Kazchrom
14	Yana Yagodina	24 January 1993	182 cm (6 ft 0 in)	69 kg (152 lb)	300 cm (9 ft 10 in)	285 cm (9 ft 4 in)	Almaty
15	Anastassiya Rostovchshikova	17 April 1994	180 cm (5 ft 11 in)	64 kg (141 lb)	280 cm (9 ft 2 in)	260 cm (8 ft 6 in)	KOSTANAY
16	Inna Matveyeva	12 October 1978	186 cm (6 ft 1 in)	70 kg (150 lb)	303 cm (9 ft 11 in)	294 cm (9 ft 8 in)	Irtysh-Kazchrom
17	Yekaterina Razorenkova	3 June 1993	185 cm (6 ft 1 in)	69 kg (152 lb)	283 cm (9 ft 3 in)	280 cm (9 ft 2 in)	Almaty
18	Yelena Gordeyeva	23 November 1988	178 cm (5 ft 10 in)	72 kg (159 lb)	280 cm (9 ft 2 in)	275 cm (9 ft 0 in)	Almaty
19	Zarina Sitkazinova	20 March 1993	182 cm (6 ft 0 in)	70 kg (150 lb)	295 cm (9 ft 8 in)	280 cm (9 ft 2 in)	Astana
20	Tatyana Fendrikova	23 February 1990	169 cm (5 ft 7 in)	55 kg (121 lb)	280 cm (9 ft 2 in)	275 cm (9 ft 0 in)	Almaty
21	Katerina Tatko	15 December 1992	182 cm (6 ft 0 in)	70 kg (150 lb)	285 cm (9 ft 4 in)	275 cm (9 ft 0 in)	ZHETYSSU
22	Irina Chumak	26 January 1994	185 cm (6 ft 1 in)	67 kg (148 lb)	285 cm (9 ft 4 in)	270 cm (8 ft 10 in)	ALMATY

== Kenya ==
- Head Coach:

The following is the Kenya roster in the 2014 FIVB World Grand Prix.

#	Name	Date of birth	Height	Weight	Spike	Block	Club
1	Jane Wairimu	24 March 1985	174 cm (5 ft 9 in)	60 kg (130 lb)	300 cm (9 ft 10 in)	285 cm (9 ft 4 in)	Kenya Prisons
2	Everlyne Makuto	25 August 1990	181 cm (5 ft 11 in)	64 kg (141 lb)	328 cm (10 ft 9 in)	308 cm (10 ft 1 in)	Kenya Prisons
3	Triza Atuka	14 April 1992	188 cm (6 ft 2 in)	65 kg (143 lb)	298 cm (9 ft 9 in)	293 cm (9 ft 7 in)	Kenya Pipeline company
4	Esther Wangeci	22 November 1990	180 cm (5 ft 11 in)	73 kg (161 lb)	302 cm (9 ft 11 in)	296 cm (9 ft 9 in)	Kenya Pipeline Company
5	Diana Khisa	26 May 1987	180 cm (5 ft 11 in)	72 kg (159 lb)	305 cm (10 ft 0 in)	300 cm (9 ft 10 in)	Kenya Prisons
6	Ruth Jepngetich	9 April 1990	186 cm (6 ft 1 in)	74 kg (163 lb)	194 cm (6 ft 4 in)	199 cm (6 ft 6 in)	Kenya Pipeline Company
7	Jannet Wanja	24 February 1984	175 cm (5 ft 9 in)	59 kg (130 lb)	299 cm (9 ft 10 in)	287 cm (9 ft 5 in)	Kenya Pipeline Company
8	Violet Makuto	12 March 1992	167 cm (5 ft 6 in)	65 kg (143 lb)	298 cm (9 ft 9 in)	290 cm (9 ft 6 in)	Kenya Pipeline Company
9	Elizabeth Wanyama	27 May 1987	174 cm (5 ft 9 in)	68 kg (150 lb)	270 cm (8 ft 10 in)	260 cm (8 ft 6 in)	Kenya Prisons
10	Noel Murambi	29 January 1989	178 cm (5 ft 10 in)	68 kg (150 lb)	190 cm (6 ft 3 in)	194 cm (6 ft 4 in)	Kenya Pipeline
11	Esther Mwombe	12 May 1987	173 cm (5 ft 8 in)	67 kg (148 lb)	300 cm (9 ft 10 in)	285 cm (9 ft 4 in)	Kenya Prisons
12	Lydia Maiyo	3 November 1988	185 cm (6 ft 1 in)	75 kg (165 lb)	325 cm (10 ft 8 in)	315 cm (10 ft 4 in)	Kenya Prisons
13	Joan Kibor	30 September 1989	175 cm (5 ft 9 in)	62 kg (137 lb)	302 cm (9 ft 11 in)	299 cm (9 ft 10 in)	KENYA PRISONS
14	Mercy Moim	1 January 1989	183 cm (6 ft 0 in)	72 kg (159 lb)	320 cm (10 ft 6 in)	308 cm (10 ft 1 in)	Kenya Prisons
15	Brackcides Khadambi	14 May 1984	180 cm (5 ft 11 in)	70 kg (150 lb)	310 cm (10 ft 2 in)	306 cm (10 ft 0 in)	Kenya Prisons
16	Agripina Kundu	24 April 1993	165 cm (5 ft 5 in)	66 kg (146 lb)	294 cm (9 ft 8 in)	288 cm (9 ft 5 in)	Kenya Pipeline Company
17	Gaudencia Makokha	15 November 1992	187 cm (6 ft 2 in)	68 kg (150 lb)	280 cm (9 ft 2 in)	270 cm (8 ft 10 in)	Kenya Pipeline company
18	Monica Biama	24 March 1988	176 cm (5 ft 9 in)	59 kg (130 lb)	300 cm (9 ft 10 in)	270 cm (8 ft 10 in)	Kenya Pipeline Company
19	Edith Mukuvilani	20 July 1994	184 cm (6 ft 0 in)	73 kg (161 lb)	305 cm (10 ft 0 in)	298 cm (9 ft 9 in)	Kenya Prisons
20	Joy Lusenaka	25 February 1991	180 cm (5 ft 11 in)	62 kg (137 lb)	302 cm (9 ft 11 in)	290 cm (9 ft 6 in)	Kenya Prisons
21	Leonida Kasaya	10 October 1993	168 cm (5 ft 6 in)	67 kg (148 lb)	297 cm (9 ft 9 in)	292 cm (9 ft 7 in)	Kenya Pipeline company

== South Korea ==
- Head coach:

The following is the South Korea roster in the 2014 FIVB World Grand Prix.

#	Name	Date of birth	Height	Weight	Spike	Block	Club
1	Lee So-young	17 October 1994	176 cm (5 ft 9 in)	69 kg (152 lb)	280 cm (9 ft 2 in)	265 cm (8 ft 8 in)	GS Caltex
2	Baek Mok-hwa	30 August 1989	177 cm (5 ft 10 in)	61 kg (134 lb)	280 cm (9 ft 2 in)	277 cm (9 ft 1 in)	Korea Ginseng Corporation
3	Lee Hyo-hee	9 September 1980	173 cm (5 ft 8 in)	60 kg (130 lb)	280 cm (9 ft 2 in)	271 cm (8 ft 11 in)	Korea Expressway Corporation
4	Hwang Youn-joo	13 August 1986	177 cm (5 ft 10 in)	68 kg (150 lb)	303 cm (9 ft 11 in)	294 cm (9 ft 8 in)	Hyundai Construction
5	Kim Hae-ran	16 March 1984	168 cm (5 ft 6 in)	60 kg (130 lb)	280 cm (9 ft 2 in)	270 cm (8 ft 10 in)	Korea Expressway
6	Kim Su-ji	11 July 1987	186 cm (6 ft 1 in)	68 kg (150 lb)	303 cm (9 ft 11 in)	294 cm (9 ft 8 in)	Heungkuk Life Insurance
7	Kim Hye-jin	17 February 1989	180 cm (5 ft 11 in)	62 kg (137 lb)	284 cm (9 ft 4 in)	274 cm (9 ft 0 in)	Heungkuk Life Insurance
8	Nam Jie-youn	25 May 1983	172 cm (5 ft 8 in)	63 kg (139 lb)	285 cm (9 ft 4 in)	273 cm (8 ft 11 in)	IBK
9	Jung Ji-youn	28 June 1980	178 cm (5 ft 10 in)	64 kg (141 lb)	295 cm (9 ft 8 in)	284 cm (9 ft 4 in)	GS Caltex
10	Kim Yeon-koung	26 February 1988	192 cm (6 ft 4 in)	73 kg (161 lb)	307 cm (10 ft 1 in)	299 cm (9 ft 10 in)	FENERBAHCE
11	Park Jeong-ah	26 March 1993	185 cm (6 ft 1 in)	68 kg (150 lb)	300 cm (9 ft 10 in)	290 cm (9 ft 6 in)	IBK
12	Han Song-yi	5 September 1984	186 cm (6 ft 1 in)	65 kg (143 lb)	305 cm (10 ft 0 in)	298 cm (9 ft 9 in)	GS Caltex
13	Ha Joon-eem	26 December 1989	189 cm (6 ft 2 in)	74 kg (163 lb)	287 cm (9 ft 5 in)	281 cm (9 ft 3 in)	Korea Expressway Corporation
14	Na Hyun-jung	10 March 1990	163 cm (5 ft 4 in)	54 kg (119 lb)	257 cm (8 ft 5 in)	250 cm (8 ft 2 in)	GS Caltex
15	Yeum Hye-seon	3 February 1991	177 cm (5 ft 10 in)	65 kg (143 lb)	302 cm (9 ft 11 in)	291 cm (9 ft 7 in)	Hyundai Construction
16	Bae Yoo-na	30 November 1989	180 cm (5 ft 11 in)	67 kg (148 lb)	303 cm (9 ft 11 in)	294 cm (9 ft 8 in)	GS Caltex
17	Yang Hyo-jin	14 December 1989	190 cm (6 ft 3 in)	72 kg (159 lb)	287 cm (9 ft 5 in)	280 cm (9 ft 2 in)	Hyundai Construction
18	Pyo Seung-ju	7 August 1992	181 cm (5 ft 11 in)	72 kg (159 lb)	290 cm (9 ft 6 in)	270 cm (8 ft 10 in)	GS Caltex
19	Kim Hee-jin	29 April 1991	185 cm (6 ft 1 in)	77 kg (170 lb)	300 cm (9 ft 10 in)	295 cm (9 ft 8 in)	IBK
20	Go Ye-rim	12 June 1994	177 cm (5 ft 10 in)	64 kg (141 lb)	0 cm (0 in)	0 cm (0 in)	Korea Expressway Corporation
21	Lee Jae-yeong	15 October 1996	179 cm (5 ft 10 in)	66 kg (146 lb)	282 cm (9 ft 3 in)	263 cm (8 ft 8 in)	Heungkuk Life Insurance
22	Lee Da-yeong	15 October 1996	179 cm (5 ft 10 in)	63 kg (139 lb)	282 cm (9 ft 3 in)	263 cm (8 ft 8 in)	Hyundai Construction

== Mexico ==
- Head Coach:

The following is the Mexico roster in the 2014 FIVB World Grand Prix.

#	Name	Date of birth	Height	Weight	Spike	Block	Club
1	Gema Leon	11 March 1991	181 cm (5 ft 11 in)	63 kg (139 lb)	292 cm (9 ft 7 in)	275 cm (9 ft 0 in)	NUEVO LEON
2	Lizeth Lopez	14 May 1990	164 cm (5 ft 5 in)	62 kg (137 lb)	277 cm (9 ft 1 in)	252 cm (8 ft 3 in)	BAJA CALIFORNIA
3	Claudia Lizbeth Resendiz Lopez	21 May 1994	172 cm (5 ft 8 in)	72 kg (159 lb)	268 cm (8 ft 10 in)	260 cm (8 ft 6 in)	JALISCO
4	Selena Barajas	22 January 1982	182 cm (6 ft 0 in)	72 kg (159 lb)	296 cm (9 ft 9 in)	275 cm (9 ft 0 in)	UANL
5	Andrea Rangel	19 May 1993	180 cm (5 ft 11 in)	57 kg (126 lb)	297 cm (9 ft 9 in)	289 cm (9 ft 6 in)	NUEVO LEON
6	Freda Maria Lopez Olmos	17 June 1988	164 cm (5 ft 5 in)	64 kg (141 lb)	235 cm (7 ft 9 in)	230 cm (7 ft 7 in)	OAXACA
7	Alejandra Perales	11 August 1992	170 cm (5 ft 7 in)	57 kg (126 lb)	263 cm (8 ft 8 in)	250 cm (8 ft 2 in)	NUEVO LEON
8	Dulce Carranza	29 June 1990	178 cm (5 ft 10 in)	83 kg (183 lb)	275 cm (9 ft 0 in)	252 cm (8 ft 3 in)	NUEVO LEON
9	Alejandra Patricia Segura Maldonado	9 November 1993	177 cm (5 ft 10 in)	69 kg (152 lb)	291 cm (9 ft 7 in)	283 cm (9 ft 3 in)	NUEVO LEON
10	Lizbeth Sainz	14 December 1995	178 cm (5 ft 10 in)	55 kg (121 lb)	295 cm (9 ft 8 in)	285 cm (9 ft 4 in)	BAJA CALIFORNIA
11	Alejandra Isiordia	17 April 1994	184 cm (6 ft 0 in)	72 kg (159 lb)	283 cm (9 ft 3 in)	274 cm (9 ft 0 in)	BAJA CALIFORNIA
12	Montserrat Castro Narvaez	12 December 1996	199 cm (6 ft 6 in)	85 kg (187 lb)	270 cm (8 ft 10 in)	268 cm (8 ft 10 in)	UNAM
13	Marion Frias	19 January 1982	191 cm (6 ft 3 in)	105 kg (231 lb)	305 cm (10 ft 0 in)	296 cm (9 ft 9 in)	DISTRITO FEDERAL
14	Claudia Rios	22 September 1992	178 cm (5 ft 10 in)	64 kg (141 lb)	282 cm (9 ft 3 in)	262 cm (8 ft 7 in)	TAMAULIPAS
15	Jocelyn Urias	16 February 1996	190 cm (6 ft 3 in)	65 kg (143 lb)	296 cm (9 ft 9 in)	284 cm (9 ft 4 in)	BAJA CALIFORNIA
16	Karla Sainz	22 July 1993	184 cm (6 ft 0 in)	75 kg (165 lb)	282 cm (9 ft 3 in)	272 cm (8 ft 11 in)	BAJA CALIFORNIA
17	Zaira Orellana	3 May 1989	183 cm (6 ft 0 in)	63 kg (139 lb)	295 cm (9 ft 8 in)	287 cm (9 ft 5 in)	JALISCO
18	Jazmin Hernandez	18 September 1989	175 cm (5 ft 9 in)	70 kg (150 lb)	295 cm (9 ft 8 in)	287 cm (9 ft 5 in)	NUEVO LEON
19	Fernanda Guitron	7 March 1996	183 cm (6 ft 0 in)	78 kg (172 lb)	295 cm (9 ft 8 in)	288 cm (9 ft 5 in)	JALISCO
20	Ana Valle	31 May 1996	194 cm (6 ft 4 in)	89 kg (196 lb)	310 cm (10 ft 2 in)	297 cm (9 ft 9 in)	DISTRITO FEDERAL
21	Kaomi Solis	6 August 1994	160 cm (5 ft 3 in)	56 kg (123 lb)	250 cm (8 ft 2 in)	240 cm (7 ft 10 in)	COLIMA
22	Gabriela Leyva Olvera	5 March 1994	183 cm (6 ft 0 in)	98 kg (216 lb)	0 cm (0 in)	0 cm (0 in)	0

== Netherlands ==
- Head Coach:

The following is the Netherlands roster in the 2014 FIVB World Grand Prix.

#	Name	Date of birth	Height	Weight	Spike	Block	Club
1	Britt Bongaerts	3 November 1996	185 cm (6 ft 1 in)	68 kg (150 lb)	296 cm (9 ft 9 in)	284 cm (9 ft 4 in)	Eurosped TVT
2	Femke Stoltenborg	30 July 1991	189 cm (6 ft 2 in)	81 kg (179 lb)	303 cm (9 ft 11 in)	299 cm (9 ft 10 in)	MTV Stuttgart
3	Yvon Belien	28 December 1993	188 cm (6 ft 2 in)	73 kg (161 lb)	307 cm (10 ft 1 in)	303 cm (9 ft 11 in)	Piacenza
4	Celeste Plak	26 October 1995	190 cm (6 ft 3 in)	87 kg (192 lb)	314 cm (10 ft 4 in)	302 cm (9 ft 11 in)	Volley Bergamo
5	Robin De Kruijf	5 May 1991	192 cm (6 ft 4 in)	81 kg (179 lb)	313 cm (10 ft 3 in)	300 cm (9 ft 10 in)	VakifBank Istanbul
6	Celia Diemkoudre	30 July 1992	182 cm (6 ft 0 in)	66 kg (146 lb)	300 cm (9 ft 10 in)	290 cm (9 ft 6 in)	Sliedrecht Sport
7	Quinta Steenbergen	2 April 1985	189 cm (6 ft 2 in)	75 kg (165 lb)	309 cm (10 ft 2 in)	300 cm (9 ft 10 in)	VK Agel Prostejov
8	Judith Pietersen	3 July 1989	188 cm (6 ft 2 in)	73 kg (161 lb)	306 cm (10 ft 0 in)	296 cm (9 ft 9 in)	Scandicci
9	Myrthe Schoot	29 August 1988	182 cm (6 ft 0 in)	70 kg (150 lb)	298 cm (9 ft 9 in)	286 cm (9 ft 5 in)	Dresdner SC
10	Lonneke Slöetjes	15 November 1990	191 cm (6 ft 3 in)	76 kg (168 lb)	322 cm (10 ft 7 in)	315 cm (10 ft 4 in)	Vakifbank Istanbul
11	Anne Buijs	2 December 1991	191 cm (6 ft 3 in)	73 kg (161 lb)	317 cm (10 ft 5 in)	299 cm (9 ft 10 in)	Vakifbank Istanbul
12	Manon Nummerdor-Flier	8 February 1984	192 cm (6 ft 4 in)	71 kg (157 lb)	315 cm (10 ft 4 in)	301 cm (9 ft 11 in)	Zhengrong Fujian
13	Flore Gravesteijn	26 April 1987	189 cm (6 ft 2 in)	68 kg (150 lb)	303 cm (9 ft 11 in)	291 cm (9 ft 7 in)	Saint-Cloud Paris SF
14	Laura Dijkema	18 February 1990	184 cm (6 ft 0 in)	70 kg (150 lb)	293 cm (9 ft 7 in)	279 cm (9 ft 2 in)	Dresdner SC
16	Kirsten Knip	14 September 1992	175 cm (5 ft 9 in)	70 kg (150 lb)	281 cm (9 ft 3 in)	275 cm (9 ft 0 in)	Rote Raben Vilsbiburg
17	Carlijn Jans	24 July 1987	192 cm (6 ft 4 in)	77 kg (170 lb)	310 cm (10 ft 2 in)	301 cm (9 ft 11 in)	VC Sneek
18	Lynn Thijssen	22 August 1992	187 cm (6 ft 2 in)	73 kg (161 lb)	298 cm (9 ft 9 in)	284 cm (9 ft 4 in)	Sliedrecht Sport
19	Karine Muijlwijk	16 February 1988	182 cm (6 ft 0 in)	75 kg (165 lb)	309 cm (10 ft 2 in)	299 cm (9 ft 10 in)	VC Wiesbaden
20	Quirine Oosterveld	5 March 1990	181 cm (5 ft 11 in)	70 kg (150 lb)	296 cm (9 ft 9 in)	288 cm (9 ft 5 in)	Rote Raben Vilsbiburg
21	Esther Van Berkel	31 August 1990	176 cm (5 ft 9 in)	68 kg (150 lb)	301 cm (9 ft 11 in)	287 cm (9 ft 5 in)	Saint-Cloud Paris SF
22	Nicole Koolhaas	31 January 1991	198 cm (6 ft 6 in)	77 kg (170 lb)	310 cm (10 ft 2 in)	300 cm (9 ft 10 in)	VFM Volley Franches-Montagnes

== Peru ==
- Head Coach: Natalia Málaga

#	Name	Shirt Name	Date of birth	Height	Weight	Spike	Block	Club
1	Hilary Palma	PALMA	5/1/1997	169	65	268	261	Sporting Cristal
2	Katherinne Olemar	OLEMAR	10/5/1993	174	65	293	280	Universidad César Vallejo
3	Carla Rueda	RUEDA	19/04/1990	184	70	312	306	Deportivo Géminis
4	Daniela Uribe	URIBE	11/12/1993	185	63	302	292	Univ. San Martín de Porres
5	Shiamara Almeida	ALMEIDA	19/02/1996	172	62	286	275	Sporting Cristal
6	Alexandra Muñoz	MUÑOZ	16/08/1992	180	63	287	281	Universidad César Vallejo
7	Andrea Urrutia	URRUTIA	31/05/1997	185	65	288	285	Univ. San Martín de Porres
8	Maguilaura Frias	FRIAS	28/05/1997	184	71	291	280	Univ. San Martín de Porres
9	Raffaella Camet	CAMET	14/09/1992	184	67	289	285	Sporting Cristal
10	Grecia Herrada	HERRADA	13/03/1993	177	65	295	285	Deportivo Géminis
11	Clarivet Yllescas	YLLESCAS	11/08/1993	187	63	305	295	Universidad César Vallejo
12	Angela Leyva	LEYVA	22/11/1996	182	70	310	298	Univ. San Martín de Porres
13	Yomira Villacorta	VILLACORTA	11/01/1996	164	61	265	250	Club Deportivo Wanka
14	Luciana Del Valle	DEL VALLE	30/10/1996	180	59	275	266	Regatas Lima
15	Karla Ortiz	ORTIZ	20/10/1991	182	60	300	290	Sporting Cristal
16	Maria De Fatima Acosta	ACOSTA	25/05/1992	154	56	275	270	Deportivo Géminis
17	Barbara Briceño	BRICEÑO	14/05/1996	174	83	285	278	Universidad César Vallejo
18	Coraima Gomez	GOMEZ	09/08/1996	180	70	280	275	Alianza Lima
19	Susan Egoavil	EGOAVIL	16/01/1988	162	52	265	251	Sporting Cristal

== Poland ==
- Head Coach: Piotr Makowski

The following is the Poland roster in the 2014 FIVB World Grand Prix.

#	Name	Date of birth	Height	Weight	Spike	Block	Club
1	Tamara Kaliszuk	20 March 1990	181 cm (5 ft 11 in)	73 kg (161 lb)	296 cm (9 ft 9 in)	281 cm (9 ft 3 in)	MKS SA
2	Emilia Kajzer	10 March 1992	181 cm (5 ft 11 in)	62 kg (137 lb)	284 cm (9 ft 4 in)	271 cm (8 ft 11 in)	PGNiG Nafta
3	Katarzyna Polec	13 February 1989	190 cm (6 ft 3 in)	77 kg (170 lb)	305 cm (10 ft 0 in)	271 cm (8 ft 11 in)	KS Palac
4	Izabela Belcik	29 November 1980	185 cm (6 ft 1 in)	65 kg (143 lb)	304 cm (10 ft 0 in)	292 cm (9 ft 7 in)	Atom Trefl
5	Agnieszka Kakolewska	17 October 1994	197 cm (6 ft 6 in)	75 kg (165 lb)	309 cm (10 ft 2 in)	295 cm (9 ft 8 in)	Impel
6	Zuzanna Efimienko	8 August 1989	197 cm (6 ft 6 in)	72 kg (159 lb)	318 cm (10 ft 5 in)	303 cm (9 ft 11 in)	Atom Trefl
7	Julia Twardowska	4 May 1995	185 cm (6 ft 1 in)	66 kg (146 lb)	297 cm (9 ft 9 in)	283 cm (9 ft 3 in)	KS Palac
8	Katarzyna Zaroslinska	3 February 1987	187 cm (6 ft 2 in)	72 kg (159 lb)	312 cm (10 ft 3 in)	290 cm (9 ft 6 in)	Atom Trefl
9	Maja Tokarska	22 February 1991	193 cm (6 ft 4 in)	72 kg (159 lb)	303 cm (9 ft 11 in)	292 cm (9 ft 7 in)	Atom Trefl
10	Daria Paszek	30 August 1991	185 cm (6 ft 1 in)	76 kg (168 lb)	303 cm (9 ft 11 in)	280 cm (9 ft 2 in)	Legionovia SA
11	Dorota Medynska	25 April 1993	168 cm (5 ft 6 in)	60 kg (130 lb)	280 cm (9 ft 2 in)	261 cm (8 ft 7 in)	Impel
12	Izabela Kowalinska	23 February 1985	186 cm (6 ft 1 in)	77 kg (170 lb)	300 cm (9 ft 10 in)	283 cm (9 ft 3 in)	KPS Chemik
13	Agata Durajczyk	19 August 1989	170 cm (5 ft 7 in)	63 kg (139 lb)	280 cm (9 ft 2 in)	275 cm (9 ft 0 in)	Atom Trefl
14	Joanna Wolosz	7 April 1990	181 cm (5 ft 11 in)	65 kg (143 lb)	303 cm (9 ft 11 in)	281 cm (9 ft 3 in)	Yamamay Busto Arsizio
15	Natalia Kurnikowska	13 January 1992	183 cm (6 ft 0 in)	73 kg (161 lb)	305 cm (10 ft 0 in)	287 cm (9 ft 5 in)	Polski Cukier Muszynianka Fakr
16	Elzbieta Skowronska	6 July 1983	183 cm (6 ft 0 in)	71 kg (157 lb)	305 cm (10 ft 0 in)	280 cm (9 ft 2 in)	Canakkale
17	Klaudia Kaczorowska	20 December 1988	184 cm (6 ft 0 in)	68 kg (150 lb)	303 cm (9 ft 11 in)	281 cm (9 ft 3 in)	Atom Trefl
18	Aleksandra Wojcik	3 January 1994	184 cm (6 ft 0 in)	76 kg (168 lb)	297 cm (9 ft 9 in)	279 cm (9 ft 2 in)	Legionovia SA
19	Anna Korabiec	11 January 1995	172 cm (5 ft 8 in)	63 kg (139 lb)	282 cm (9 ft 3 in)	265 cm (8 ft 8 in)	KS Palac
20	Gabriela Jasinska	14 July 1992	181 cm (5 ft 11 in)	64 kg (141 lb)	295 cm (9 ft 8 in)	281 cm (9 ft 3 in)	Polski Cukier Muszynianka Fakr
21	Aleksandra Sikorska	28 April 1993	185 cm (6 ft 1 in)	67 kg (148 lb)	306 cm (10 ft 0 in)	286 cm (9 ft 5 in)	Budowlani
22	Malwina Smarzek	3 June 1996	191 cm (6 ft 3 in)	80 kg (180 lb)	318 cm (10 ft 5 in)	292 cm (9 ft 7 in)	Legionovia SA

== Puerto Rico ==
- Head Coach:

The following is the Puerto Rico roster in the 2014 FIVB World Grand Prix.

#	Name	Date of birth	Height	Weight	Spike	Block	Club
1	Debora Seilhamer	4 October 1985	166 cm (5 ft 5 in)	61 kg (134 lb)	245 cm (8 ft 0 in)	240 cm (7 ft 10 in)	Cataño
2	Shara Venegas	18 September 1992	172 cm (5 ft 8 in)	58 kg (128 lb)	280 cm (9 ft 2 in)	270 cm (8 ft 10 in)	Toa Baja
3	Vilmarie Mojica	13 August 1985	180 cm (5 ft 11 in)	63 kg (139 lb)	295 cm (9 ft 8 in)	288 cm (9 ft 5 in)	Caguas
4	Raymariely Santos	13 April 1992	183 cm (6 ft 0 in)	72 kg (159 lb)	290 cm (9 ft 6 in)	288 cm (9 ft 5 in)	Ponce
5	Patricia Montero	22 August 1997	178 cm (5 ft 10 in)	58 kg (128 lb)	225 cm (7 ft 5 in)	224 cm (7 ft 4 in)	National Team
6	Yarimar Rosa	20 June 1988	178 cm (5 ft 10 in)	62 kg (137 lb)	295 cm (9 ft 8 in)	285 cm (9 ft 4 in)	Mayaguez
7	Stephanie Enright	15 December 1990	179 cm (5 ft 10 in)	56 kg (123 lb)	300 cm (9 ft 10 in)	292 cm (9 ft 7 in)	Caguas
8	Shirley Ferrer	23 June 1991	180 cm (5 ft 11 in)	63 kg (139 lb)	290 cm (9 ft 6 in)	293 cm (9 ft 7 in)	Humacao
9	Aurea Cruz	10 January 1982	180 cm (5 ft 11 in)	63 kg (139 lb)	310 cm (10 ft 2 in)	290 cm (9 ft 6 in)	Carolina
10	Genesis Collazo	4 October 1992	185 cm (6 ft 1 in)	74 kg (163 lb)	301 cm (9 ft 11 in)	296 cm (9 ft 9 in)	Caguas
11	Karina Ocasio	1 August 1985	192 cm (6 ft 4 in)	76 kg (168 lb)	298 cm (9 ft 9 in)	288 cm (9 ft 5 in)	Caguas
12	Jennifer Nogueras	1 August 1991	185 cm (6 ft 1 in)	88 kg (194 lb)	299 cm (9 ft 10 in)	292 cm (9 ft 7 in)	National Team
13	Janeliss Torres	9 July 1991	166 cm (5 ft 5 in)	62 kg (137 lb)	305 cm (10 ft 0 in)	296 cm (9 ft 9 in)	Ponce
14	Natalia Valentin	12 September 1989	170 cm (5 ft 7 in)	61 kg (134 lb)	244 cm (8 ft 0 in)	240 cm (7 ft 10 in)	Ponce
15	Daly Santana	19 February 1995	185 cm (6 ft 1 in)	65 kg (143 lb)	300 cm (9 ft 10 in)	274 cm (9 ft 0 in)	National Team
16	Alexandra Oquendo	3 February 1984	189 cm (6 ft 2 in)	75 kg (165 lb)	297 cm (9 ft 9 in)	284 cm (9 ft 4 in)	Caguas
17	Sheila Ocasio	17 November 1982	195 cm (6 ft 5 in)	74 kg (163 lb)	310 cm (10 ft 2 in)	292 cm (9 ft 7 in)	Juncos
18	Lynda Morales	20 May 1988	188 cm (6 ft 2 in)	74 kg (163 lb)	302 cm (9 ft 11 in)	296 cm (9 ft 9 in)	Guaynabo
19	Legna Hernandez	18 July 1991	178 cm (5 ft 10 in)	66 kg (146 lb)	278 cm (9 ft 1 in)	272 cm (8 ft 11 in)	Ponce
20	Vanesa Velez	29 August 1989	180 cm (5 ft 11 in)	68 kg (150 lb)	292 cm (9 ft 7 in)	280 cm (9 ft 2 in)	Carolina
21	Amanda Vazquez	30 March 1984	185 cm (6 ft 1 in)	94 kg (207 lb)	302 cm (9 ft 11 in)	297 cm (9 ft 9 in)	Mayaguez
22	Nayka Benitez	2 August 1989	180 cm (5 ft 11 in)	66 kg (146 lb)	246 cm (8 ft 1 in)	240 cm (7 ft 10 in)	Guaynabo

== Russia ==
- Head Coach:

The following is the Russia roster in the 2014 FIVB World Grand Prix.

#	Name	Date of birth	Height	Weight	Spike	Block	Club
1	Yana Shcherban	6 September 1989	185 cm (6 ft 1 in)	71 kg (157 lb)	298 cm (9 ft 9 in)	294 cm (9 ft 8 in)	Dinamo-Krasnodar
2	Anna Matienko	12 July 1981	182 cm (6 ft 0 in)	68 kg (150 lb)	298 cm (9 ft 9 in)	292 cm (9 ft 7 in)	Uralochka
3	Anastasia Bavykina	6 July 1992	188 cm (6 ft 2 in)	73 kg (161 lb)	313 cm (10 ft 3 in)	300 cm (9 ft 10 in)	Zarechie Odintsovo
4	Irina Zaryazhko	4 October 1991	196 cm (6 ft 5 in)	78 kg (172 lb)	305 cm (10 ft 0 in)	290 cm (9 ft 6 in)	Uralochka
5	Alexandra Pasynkova	14 April 1987	190 cm (6 ft 3 in)	75 kg (165 lb)	313 cm (10 ft 3 in)	305 cm (10 ft 0 in)	Dinamo Krasnodar
6	Iuliia Kutiukova	30 March 1989	183 cm (6 ft 0 in)	74 kg (163 lb)	0 cm (0 in)	299 cm (9 ft 10 in)	Omichka Omsk
7	Svetlana Kryuchkova	21 February 1985	174 cm (5 ft 9 in)	63 kg (139 lb)	290 cm (9 ft 6 in)	286 cm (9 ft 5 in)	Dinamo Krasnodar
8	Nataliya Goncharova	1 June 1989	194 cm (6 ft 4 in)	75 kg (165 lb)	315 cm (10 ft 4 in)	306 cm (10 ft 0 in)	Dinamo Moscow
9	Anastasia Markova	16 October 1987	189 cm (6 ft 2 in)	71 kg (157 lb)	305 cm (10 ft 0 in)	300 cm (9 ft 10 in)	Dinamo Moscow
10	Ekaterina Kosianenko	2 February 1990	178 cm (5 ft 10 in)	64 kg (141 lb)	290 cm (9 ft 6 in)	285 cm (9 ft 4 in)	Zarechie-Odinzovo
11	Iuliia Morozova	8 January 1985	192 cm (6 ft 4 in)	79 kg (174 lb)	305 cm (10 ft 0 in)	301 cm (9 ft 11 in)	Dinamo Moscow
12	Nelli Alisheva	20 December 1983	204 cm (6 ft 8 in)	82 kg (181 lb)	317 cm (10 ft 5 in)	308 cm (10 ft 1 in)	Proton
13	Evgeniya Startseva	12 February 1989	185 cm (6 ft 1 in)	68 kg (150 lb)	294 cm (9 ft 8 in)	290 cm (9 ft 6 in)	Dinamo-Kazan
14	Irina Fetisova	7 September 1994	190 cm (6 ft 3 in)	76 kg (168 lb)	307 cm (10 ft 1 in)	286 cm (9 ft 5 in)	Zarechie Odintsovo
15	Tatiana Kosheleva	23 December 1988	191 cm (6 ft 3 in)	67 kg (148 lb)	315 cm (10 ft 4 in)	305 cm (10 ft 0 in)	Dinamo Krasnodar
16	Yuliya Podskalnaya	18 April 1989	190 cm (6 ft 3 in)	75 kg (165 lb)	306 cm (10 ft 0 in)	295 cm (9 ft 8 in)	Dinamo Krasnodar
17	Natalia Malykh	8 December 1993	187 cm (6 ft 2 in)	65 kg (143 lb)	308 cm (10 ft 1 in)	297 cm (9 ft 9 in)	Zarechie-Odinzovo
18	Ekaterina Chernova	26 January 1986	178 cm (5 ft 10 in)	68 kg (150 lb)	292 cm (9 ft 7 in)	290 cm (9 ft 6 in)	Uralochka
19	Anna Malova	16 April 1990	175 cm (5 ft 9 in)	59 kg (130 lb)	286 cm (9 ft 5 in)	290 cm (9 ft 6 in)	Dinamo Moscow
20	Anastasia Shlyakhovaya	5 October 1990	192 cm (6 ft 4 in)	69 kg (152 lb)	313 cm (10 ft 3 in)	307 cm (10 ft 1 in)	Omichka Omsk
21	Natalia Guskova	10 May 1996	176 cm (5 ft 9 in)	69 kg (152 lb)	275 cm (9 ft 0 in)	270 cm (8 ft 10 in)	Zarechie

== Serbia ==
- Head Coach: (Serbia) Zoran Terzić

The following is the Serbia roster in the 2014 FIVB World Grand Prix.

#	Name	Date of birth	Height	Weight	Spike	Block	Club
1	Maja Savic	14 August 1993	189 cm (6 ft 2 in)	70 kg (150 lb)	305 cm (10 ft 0 in)	294 cm (9 ft 8 in)	VIZURA Beograd (SRB)
2	Jovana Brakocevic	5 March 1988	196 cm (6 ft 5 in)	82 kg (181 lb)	309 cm (10 ft 2 in)	295 cm (9 ft 8 in)	VAKIFBANK Istanbul (TUR)
3	Sanja Malagurski	8 June 1990	193 cm (6 ft 4 in)	74 kg (163 lb)	305 cm (10 ft 0 in)	295 cm (9 ft 8 in)	OSASCO VC (BRA)
4	Bojana Zivkovic	29 March 1988	186 cm (6 ft 1 in)	72 kg (159 lb)	292 cm (9 ft 7 in)	284 cm (9 ft 4 in)	ILLER Bankasi Istanbul (TUR)
5	Natasa Krsmanovic	19 June 1985	188 cm (6 ft 2 in)	73 kg (161 lb)	305 cm (10 ft 0 in)	285 cm (9 ft 4 in)	RABITA Baku (AZE)
6	Tijana Malesevic	18 March 1991	184 cm (6 ft 0 in)	73 kg (161 lb)	289 cm (9 ft 6 in)	288 cm (9 ft 5 in)	VK PROSTEJOV (CZE)
7	Brizitka Molnar	28 July 1985	182 cm (6 ft 0 in)	69 kg (152 lb)	304 cm (10 ft 0 in)	290 cm (9 ft 6 in)	ATOM TREFL (POL)
8	Danica Radenkovic	9 October 1992	185 cm (6 ft 1 in)	70 kg (150 lb)	300 cm (9 ft 10 in)	294 cm (9 ft 8 in)	SCHWERINER DC (GER)
9	Brankica Mihajlovic	13 April 1991	190 cm (6 ft 3 in)	83 kg (183 lb)	282 cm (9 ft 3 in)	264 cm (8 ft 8 in)	Hisamitsu Seiyaku Springs
10	Maja Ognjenovic (C)	6 August 1984	183 cm (6 ft 0 in)	67 kg (148 lb)	290 cm (9 ft 6 in)	270 cm (8 ft 10 in)	CHEMIC Police SA (POL)
11	Stefana Veljkovic	9 January 1990	190 cm (6 ft 3 in)	76 kg (168 lb)	320 cm (10 ft 6 in)	305 cm (10 ft 0 in)	GALATASARAY Istanbul (TUR)
12	Jelena Nikolic	13 April 1982	194 cm (6 ft 4 in)	79 kg (174 lb)	315 cm (10 ft 4 in)	300 cm (9 ft 10 in)	VAKIFBANK Istanbul (TUR)
13	Ana Bjelica	3 April 1992	190 cm (6 ft 3 in)	78 kg (172 lb)	310 cm (10 ft 2 in)	305 cm (10 ft 0 in)	CHEMIC Police SA (POL)
14	Nadja Ninkovic	1 November 1991	192 cm (6 ft 4 in)	77 kg (170 lb)	307 cm (10 ft 1 in)	298 cm (9 ft 9 in)	Volero Zürich
15	Jovana Stevanovic	30 June 1992	192 cm (6 ft 4 in)	72 kg (159 lb)	308 cm (10 ft 1 in)	295 cm (9 ft 8 in)	VBC Pallavollo Rosa ssdrl (ITA
16	Milena Rasic	25 October 1990	191 cm (6 ft 3 in)	72 kg (159 lb)	303 cm (9 ft 11 in)	293 cm (9 ft 7 in)	RC CANNES Cannes (FRA)
17	Silvija Popovic	15 March 1986	178 cm (5 ft 10 in)	65 kg (143 lb)	276 cm (9 ft 1 in)	266 cm (8 ft 9 in)	Volero Zürich (SUI)
18	Suzana Cebic	9 November 1984	167 cm (5 ft 6 in)	60 kg (130 lb)	279 cm (9 ft 2 in)	255 cm (8 ft 4 in)	LOKOMOTIV Baku (AZE)
19	Tijana Bošković	8 March 1997	193 cm (6 ft 4 in)	82 kg (181 lb)	303 cm (9 ft 11 in)	295 cm (9 ft 8 in)	VIZURA Beograd (SRB)
20	Sladjana Mirkovic	7 October 1995	185 cm (6 ft 1 in)	78 kg (172 lb)	293 cm (9 ft 7 in)	282 cm (9 ft 3 in)	VIZURA Beograd (SRB)
21	Bianka Busa	25 July 1994	187 cm (6 ft 2 in)	74 kg (163 lb)	293 cm (9 ft 7 in)	282 cm (9 ft 3 in)	VIZURA Beograd (SRB)

== Thailand ==
- Head Coach: (Thailand) Kiattipong Radchatagriengkai

The following is the Thailand roster in the 2014 FIVB World Grand Prix.

#	Name	Date of birth	Height	Weight	Spike	Block	Club
1	Wanna Buakaew	2 January 1981	172 cm (5 ft 8 in)	54 kg (119 lb)	292 cm (9 ft 7 in)	277 cm (9 ft 1 in)	Idea khonkaen VC
2	Piyanut Pannoy	10 November 1989	171 cm (5 ft 7 in)	68 kg (150 lb)	280 cm (9 ft 2 in)	275 cm (9 ft 0 in)	Supreme VC
3	Em-Orn Phanusit	25 March 1988	177 cm (5 ft 10 in)	70 kg (150 lb)	302 cm (9 ft 11 in)	291 cm (9 ft 7 in)	Idea Khonkaen VC
4	Thatdao Nuekjang	3 February 1994	183 cm (6 ft 0 in)	66 kg (146 lb)	305 cm (10 ft 0 in)	287 cm (9 ft 5 in)	Idea-Khonkaen VC
5	Pleumjit Thinkaow	9 November 1983	180 cm (5 ft 11 in)	63 kg (139 lb)	298 cm (9 ft 9 in)	281 cm (9 ft 3 in)	Bangkok Glass VC
6	Onuma Sittirak	13 June 1986	175 cm (5 ft 9 in)	72 kg (159 lb)	304 cm (10 ft 0 in)	285 cm (9 ft 4 in)	JT Marvelous
7	Hattaya Bamrungsuk	12 August 1993	178 cm (5 ft 10 in)	70 kg (150 lb)	290 cm (9 ft 6 in)	280 cm (9 ft 2 in)	Nakhonratchasima VC
8	Sineenat Phocharoen	19 May 1995	173 cm (5 ft 8 in)	53 kg (117 lb)	287 cm (9 ft 5 in)	270 cm (8 ft 10 in)	Sisaket VC
9	Chatchu-On Moksri	6 November 1999	175 cm (5 ft 9 in)	63 kg (139 lb)	285 cm (9 ft 4 in)	275 cm (9 ft 0 in)	Ayutthaya A.T.C.C
10	Wilavan Apinyapong	6 June 1984	174 cm (5 ft 9 in)	68 kg (150 lb)	294 cm (9 ft 8 in)	282 cm (9 ft 3 in)	Nakornratchasima VC
11	Jutarat Montripila	2 October 1986	175 cm (5 ft 9 in)	60 kg (130 lb)	290 cm (9 ft 6 in)	280 cm (9 ft 2 in)	Udonthani VC
12	Tapaphaipun Chaisri	29 November 1989	168 cm (5 ft 6 in)	60 kg (130 lb)	295 cm (9 ft 8 in)	276 cm (9 ft 1 in)	Sisaket VC
13	Nootsara Tomkom	7 July 1985	169 cm (5 ft 7 in)	57 kg (126 lb)	289 cm (9 ft 6 in)	278 cm (9 ft 1 in)	Rabita Baku
14	Jarasporn Bundasak	1 March 1993	180 cm (5 ft 11 in)	66 kg (146 lb)	290 cm (9 ft 6 in)	280 cm (9 ft 2 in)	Bangkok Glass VC
15	Malika Kanthong	8 January 1987	177 cm (5 ft 10 in)	63 kg (139 lb)	292 cm (9 ft 7 in)	278 cm (9 ft 1 in)	Nakhonnon-3BB VC
16	Pornpun Guedpard	5 May 1993	170 cm (5 ft 7 in)	63 kg (139 lb)	270 cm (8 ft 10 in)	267 cm (8 ft 9 in)	Bangkok Glass VC
17	Kaewkalaya Kamulthala	7 August 1994	178 cm (5 ft 10 in)	66 kg (146 lb)	298 cm (9 ft 9 in)	281 cm (9 ft 3 in)	Idea Khonkaen VC
18	Ajcharaporn Kongyot	18 June 1995	180 cm (5 ft 11 in)	66 kg (146 lb)	290 cm (9 ft 6 in)	284 cm (9 ft 4 in)	Supreme VC
19	Kannika Thipachot	3 May 1993	167 cm (5 ft 6 in)	67 kg (148 lb)	285 cm (9 ft 4 in)	273 cm (8 ft 11 in)	Ayutthaya A.T.C.C
20	Soraya Phomla	6 August 1992	169 cm (5 ft 7 in)	60 kg (130 lb)	280 cm (9 ft 2 in)	270 cm (8 ft 10 in)	Ayutthaya A.T.C.C
21	Wanida Kotruang	29 June 1990	170 cm (5 ft 7 in)	61 kg (134 lb)	283 cm (9 ft 3 in)	272 cm (8 ft 11 in)	Nakhonratchasima
22	Tikamporn Changkeaw	12 December 1984	168 cm (5 ft 6 in)	62 kg (137 lb)	260 cm (8 ft 6 in)	252 cm (8 ft 3 in)	Sisaket VC

== Turkey ==
- Head Coach: (Italy) Massimo Barbolini

#	Name	Date of birth	Height	Weight	Spike	Block	Club
1	Güldeniz Önal	25/3/1986	182	75	296	290	VakifBank
2	Gözde Kırdar Sonsırma	26/6/1985	183	72	297	292	VakifBank
3	Gizem Güreşen	14/1/1987	178	60	285	250	VakifBank
4	Gamze Alikaya	1/1/1993	179	68	292	295	Galatasaray
5	Kübra Akman	13/10/1994	197	89	310	300	VakifBank
6	Ceylan Arisan	1/1/1994	193	79	317	310	Sarıyer Belediyesi
7	Seda Tokatlıoğlu	25/6/1986	192	80	312	304	Fenerbahce
8	Bahar Toksoy	6/2/1988	190	75	302	254	VakifBank
9	Merve Dalbeler	27/6/1987	182	73	310	300	Fenerbahce
10	Yeliz Başa	13/8/1987	188	79	305	301	Hyundai Hillstate
11	Naz Aydemir	14/8/1990	186	75	290	249	VakifBank
12	Gözde Yılmaz	9/9/1991	195	82	316	300	Eczacıbaşı VitrA
13	Neriman Özsoy	13/7/1988	188	76	310	291	Imoco Volley
14	Meliha İsmailoğlu	17/9/1993	188	70	300	297	Fenerbahce
15	Şeyma Ercan	5/7/1994	187	75	300	295	Eczacıbaşı VitrA
16	Büşra Cansu	16/7/1990	188	84	296	285	Eczacıbaşı VitrA
17	Neslihan Demir	9/12/1983	187	72	307	300	Eczacıbaşı VitrA
18	Asuman Karakoyun	16/7/1990	180	72	300	290	Eczacıbaşı VitrA
19	Aslı Kalaç	13/12/1995	183	73	296	289	Galatasaray
20	Çağla Akın	19/1/1995	177	70	285	275	VakifBank
21	Özgenur Yurtdagülen	6/8/1993	193	67	290	280	Bakirkoy Belediye Yesilyurt
22	Hatice Gizem Örge	26/4/1993	170	59	270	260	VakifBank

== United States ==
- Head Coach: (United States) Karch Kiraly

The following is the United States roster in the 2014 FIVB World Grand Prix.

#	Name	Date of birth	Height	Weight	Spike	Block	Club
1	Alisha Glass	5 April 1988	184 cm (6 ft 0 in)	72 kg (159 lb)	305 cm (10 ft 0 in)	300 cm (9 ft 10 in)	Imoco Volley
2	Kayla Banwarth	21 January 1989	178 cm (5 ft 10 in)	75 kg (165 lb)	295 cm (9 ft 8 in)	283 cm (9 ft 3 in)	USA Volleyball Team
3	Courtney Thompson	4 November 1984	170 cm (5 ft 7 in)	66 kg (146 lb)	276 cm (9 ft 1 in)	263 cm (8 ft 8 in)	Rio de Janeiro Volei Clube
4	Lauren Paolini	22 August 1987	193 cm (6 ft 4 in)	73 kg (161 lb)	317 cm (10 ft 5 in)	299 cm (9 ft 10 in)	Hitachi Automotive Systems
5	Tamari Miyashiro	8 July 1987	170 cm (5 ft 7 in)	70 kg (150 lb)	284 cm (9 ft 4 in)	266 cm (8 ft 9 in)	Allianz Volley Stuttgart
6	Nicole Davis	24 April 1982	167 cm (5 ft 6 in)	73 kg (161 lb)	284 cm (9 ft 4 in)	266 cm (8 ft 9 in)	E.S. Cannet Rocheville VB
7	Cassidy Lichtman	25 May 1989	185 cm (6 ft 1 in)	68 kg (150 lb)	299 cm (9 ft 10 in)	279 cm (9 ft 2 in)	Sichuan Women's Volleyball
8	Lauren Gibbemeyer	8 September 1988	187 cm (6 ft 2 in)	71 kg (157 lb)	307 cm (10 ft 1 in)	293 cm (9 ft 7 in)	VBC Pallavolo Rosa
9	Kristin Lynn Hildebrand	30 June 1985	185 cm (6 ft 1 in)	68 kg (150 lb)	300 cm (9 ft 10 in)	284 cm (9 ft 4 in)	Impel Volleyball S.A.
10	Jordan Larson-Burbach	16 October 1986	188 cm (6 ft 2 in)	75 kg (165 lb)	302 cm (9 ft 11 in)	295 cm (9 ft 8 in)	Eczacibasi Vitra Istanbul
11	Carli Lloyd	6 August 1989	180 cm (5 ft 11 in)	75 kg (165 lb)	313 cm (10 ft 3 in)	295 cm (9 ft 8 in)	VBC Pallavolo Rosa
12	Kelly Murphy	20 October 1989	188 cm (6 ft 2 in)	79 kg (174 lb)	315 cm (10 ft 4 in)	307 cm (10 ft 1 in)	Ageo Medics
13	Christa Harmotto Dietzen	12 October 1986	188 cm (6 ft 2 in)	79 kg (174 lb)	322 cm (10 ft 7 in)	300 cm (9 ft 10 in)	Fenerbahce SK
14	Nicole Fawcett	16 December 1986	191 cm (6 ft 3 in)	82 kg (181 lb)	310 cm (10 ft 2 in)	291 cm (9 ft 7 in)	Fujian Yango Women's VB Club
15	Kimberly Hill	30 November 1989	193 cm (6 ft 4 in)	72 kg (159 lb)	320 cm (10 ft 6 in)	310 cm (10 ft 2 in)	Vakifbank Istanbul
16	Foluke Akinradewo	5 October 1987	191 cm (6 ft 3 in)	79 kg (174 lb)	331 cm (10 ft 10 in)	300 cm (9 ft 10 in)	Volero Zurich
17	Alexandra Klineman	30 December 1989	194 cm (6 ft 4 in)	73 kg (161 lb)	322 cm (10 ft 7 in)	299 cm (9 ft 10 in)	Agil Volley SSD A RL
18	Bailey Webster	21 July 1991	191 cm (6 ft 3 in)	84 kg (185 lb)	306 cm (10 ft 0 in)	298 cm (9 ft 9 in)	University of Texas
19	Kelsey Robinson	25 June 1992	188 cm (6 ft 2 in)	75 kg (165 lb)	306 cm (10 ft 0 in)	300 cm (9 ft 10 in)	Imoco Volley
20	Jenna Hagglund	28 May 1989	178 cm (5 ft 10 in)	68 kg (150 lb)	292 cm (9 ft 7 in)	290 cm (9 ft 6 in)	Futura Volley
21	Tetori Dixon	4 August 1992	191 cm (6 ft 3 in)	83 kg (183 lb)	306 cm (10 ft 0 in)	295 cm (9 ft 8 in)	Toray Arrows
22	Rachael Adams	3 June 1990	188 cm (6 ft 2 in)	81 kg (179 lb)	318 cm (10 ft 5 in)	307 cm (10 ft 1 in)	Imoco Volley
