= Choat =

Choat is a surname. Notable people with the surname include:

- Adrian Choat (born 1997), New Zealand rugby union player
- Sandra Choat, English footballer
- Sarah Choat (born 1984), Australian volleyball player
- Sean Choat (born 1970), Australian politician

== See also ==
- Tony Hunter-Choat (1936–2012), British soldier who served in the French Foreign Legion, the British Army, including in the Special Air Service, and as the commander of the Sultan of Oman's special forces
