= Mudrov =

Mudrov (Russian: Мудров) is a Slavic masculine surname, its feminine counterpart is Mudrova. Notable people with the surname include:

- Sergey Mudrov (born 1990), Russian high jumper
- Zuzana Mudrová (born 1993), Czech volleyball player
