= Tsvetelin =

Tsvetelin (Bulgarian: Цветелин) is a Bulgarian masculine given name, its feminine counterpart is Tsvetelina. It may refer to

- Tsvetelin Chunchukov (born 1994), Bulgarian footballer
- Tsvetelin Radev (born 1988), Bulgarian footballer
- Tsvetelin Tonev (born 1992), Bulgarian footballer
- Tsvetelina Abrasheva (born 1977), Bulgarian figure skater
- Tsvetelina Kirilova (born 1977), Bulgarian runner
- Tsvetelina Naydenova (born 1994), Bulgarian rhythmic gymnast
- Tsvetelina Nikolova (born 1990), Bulgarian volleyball player
- Tsvetelina Stoyanova (born 1994), Bulgarian rhythmic gymnast
- Tsvetelina Zarkova (born 1986), Bulgarian volleyball player
