= Jessica Ryder =

Australian volleyball player (born 1992)

Personal information
- Nationality: Australian
- Born: 18 May 1992 (age 34); Nambour
- Hometown: Coorparoo
- Height: 178 cm (70 in)
- Weight: 68 kg (150 lb)
- Spike: 295 cm (116 in)
- Block: 286 cm (113 in)

Volleyball information
- Number: 17 (national team)

Career
Years	Teams
2010-Current	Queensland Pirates

National team
2014	Australia

Jessica Ryder (born 18 May 1992) is an Australian female volleyball player. She is part of the Australia women's national volleyball team.

She participated in the 2014 FIVB Volleyball World Grand Prix. On club level she played for Queensland Pirates in 2014.
