= Ivana Cebáková =

Czech volleyball player (born 1986)

Ivana Cebakova

Personal information
- Nationality: Czech
- Born: 7 August 1986 (age 40)
- Height: 176 cm (69 in)
- Weight: 67 kg (148 lb)
- Spike: 295 cm (116 in)
- Block: 260 cm (102 in)

Volleyball information
- Number: 20 (national team)

Career
Years	Teams
2014	VK Kralovo Pole

National team
2014	Czech Republic

Ivana Cebakova (born 7 August 1986) is a Czech female volleyball player. She is part of the Czech Republic women's national volleyball team.

She participated in the 2014 FIVB Volleyball World Grand Prix. On club level she played for VK Kralovo Pole in 2014.
