= Sophie Paine =

Australian volleyball player (born 1992)

Personal information
- Nationality: Australian
- Born: 1 September 1992 (age 34)
- Height: 176 cm (69 in)
- Weight: 65 kg (143 lb)
- Spike: 287 cm (113 in)
- Block: 276 cm (109 in)

Volleyball information
- Current club: University Blues
- Number: 2 (national team)

Career
Years	Teams
2014	University of Houston

National team
2014–present	Australia

Sophie Paine (born 1 September 1992) is an Australian female volleyball player. She is part of the Australia women's national volleyball team.

She participated in the 2014 FIVB Volleyball World Grand Prix. On club level she played for University of Houston in 2014.
