= Celia Diemkoudre =

Dutch volleyball player (born 1992)

Personal information
- Nationality: Dutch
- Born: 30 July 1992 (age 34); Niamey, Niger
- Height: 182 cm (72 in)
- Weight: 66 kg (146 lb)
- Spike: 300 cm (118 in)
- Block: 290 cm (114 in)

Volleyball information
- Number: 6 (national team)

Career
Years	Teams
2014	Sliedrecht Sport

National team
2014-	Netherlands

Celia Diemkoudre (born 30 July 1992) is a Dutch female volleyball player. She is part of the Netherlands women's national volleyball team.

She participated in the 2014 FIVB Volleyball World Grand Prix. On club level she played for Sliedrecht Sport in 2014.

== Life ==
Diemkoudre was born in Niger, as the daughter of Alidou Diemkoudre from Niger and the Dutch aid worker Sylvia Dorland. The family moved to the Netherlands in 2001.
