= Viktoriya Grigorova =

Bulgarian volleyball player (born 1990)

Personal information
- Nationality: Bulgarian
- Born: 25 July 1990 (age 36)
- Height: 189 cm (74 in)
- Weight: 68 kg (150 lb)
- Spike: 296 cm (117 in)
- Block: 290 cm (114 in)

Volleyball information
- Number: 12 (national team)

Career
- Years: Team
- 2014: Levski

National team
- Years: Team
- 2014: Bulgaria

Viktoriya Grigorova (Bulgarian: Виктория Григорова) (born 25 July 1990) is a Bulgarian female volleyball player. She is part of the Bulgaria women's national volleyball team. On club level she played for Levski in 2014.

== Television appearances ==
2022 - participated in the fourth season of Desafio Bulgaria, where he finished in the honorable fifth
