= Rebecca Walter =

Australian volleyball player (born 1987)

Personal information
- Nationality: Australian
- Born: 10 August 1987 (age 39)
- Height: 173 cm (68 in)
- Weight: 75 kg (165 lb)
- Spike: 288 cm (113 in)
- Block: 257 cm (101 in)

Volleyball information
- Number: 11 (national team)

Career
Years	Teams
2014	University Blues

National team
2014	Australia

Rebecca Walter (born 10 August 1987) is an Australian female volleyball player. She is part of the Australia women's national volleyball team.

She participated in the 2014 FIVB Volleyball World Grand Prix. On club level she played for University Blues in 2014.
