= Nikala Cunningham =

Australian volleyball player (born 1994)

Personal information
- Nationality: Australian
- Born: 7 August 1994 (age 32)
- Height: 177 cm (70 in)
- Weight: 68 kg (150 lb)
- Spike: 285 cm (112 in)
- Block: 274 cm (108 in)

Volleyball information
- Number: 3 (national team)

Career
Years	Teams
2014	Queensland Pirates

National team
2014	Australia

Nikala Cunningham (born 7 August 1994) is an Australian female volleyball player. She is part of the Australia women's national volleyball team.

She participated in the 2014 FIVB Volleyball World Grand Prix. On club level she played for Queensland Pirates in 2014.
