= Satasha Savea =

Australian volleyball player (born 1989)

Personal information
- Nationality: Australian
- Born: 28 May 1989 (age 37)
- Height: 180 cm (71 in)
- Weight: 70 kg (154 lb)
- Spike: 297 cm (117 in)
- Block: 282 cm (111 in)

Volleyball information
- Number: 7 (national team)

Career
Years	Teams
2014	UTSSU

National team
2014	Australia

Satasha Savea (born 28 May 1989) is an Australian female volleyball player. She is part of the Australia women's national volleyball team.

She participated in the 2014 FIVB Volleyball World Grand Prix. On club level she played for UTSSU in 2014.
