= Gabriela Leyva =

Mexican volleyball player (born 1994)

Gabriela Leyva Olvera

Personal information
- Nationality: Mexican
- Born: 5 March 1994 (age 32)
- Height: 183 cm (6 ft 0 in)
- Weight: 98 kg (216 lb)

National team
2014	Mexico

Gabriela Leyva Olvera (born 5 March 1994) is a Mexican female volleyball player.

She participated in the 2014 FIVB Volleyball World Grand Prix. She is part of the Mexico women's national volleyball team.
