= Katarina Osadchuk =

Australian volleyball player (born 1991)

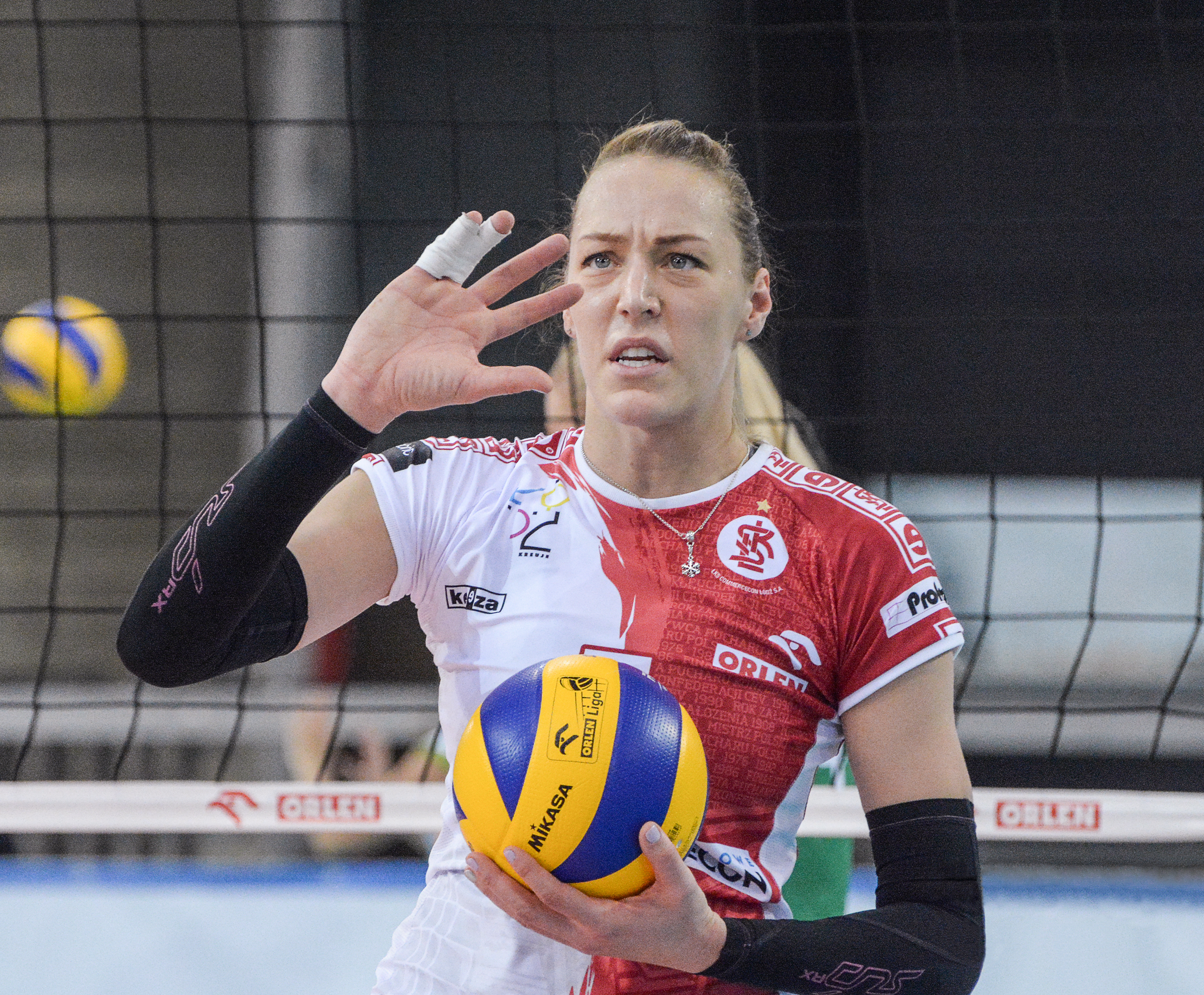

Personal information
- Nationality: Australian
- Born: 18 November 1991 (age 34)p Lviv, Ukraine
- Height: 191 cm (75 in)
- Weight: 80 kg (176 lb)
- Spike: 320 cm (126 in)
- Block: 310 cm (122 in)

Volleyball information
- Position: Middle Blocker
- Current club: ŁKS commercecon Łódź
- Number: 1 (national team)

Career
Years	Teams
2014	Orebro Volley
2015	Sulechow
2016	ŁKS Commercecon Łódź
2017	Vfb Thuringien Suhl
2018	AZS Politechnika Śląska Gliwice
2019	7r Solna Wieliczka
2020	ŁKS Commercecon Łódż
2021

National team
2011 – present	Australia

Katarina Osadchuk (born 18 November 1991) is an Australian female volleyball player. She is part of the Australia women's national volleyball team.

She participated in the 2014 FIVB Volleyball World Grand Prix. On club level she played for ŁKS Łódź in 2015.
