= Iveta Halbichová =

Czech volleyball player (born 1989)

Iveta Halbichova

Personal information
- Nationality: Czech
- Born: 19 December 1989 (age 36)
- Height: 178 cm (70 in)
- Weight: 67 kg (148 lb)
- Spike: 285 cm (112 in)
- Block: 280 cm (110 in)

Volleyball information
- Number: 12 (national team)

Career
Years	Teams
2014	PVK Olymp Praha

National team
2014	Czech Republic

Iveta Halbichova (born 19 December 1989) is a Czech female volleyball player. She is part of the Czech Republic women's national volleyball team.

She participated in the 2014 FIVB Volleyball World Grand Prix. On the club level, she played for PVK Olymp Praha in 2014.
