= Olivia Orchard =

Australian volleyball player (born 1984)

Personal information
- Nationality: Australian
- Born: 4 February 1984 (age 42)
- Height: 171 cm (67 in)
- Weight: 62 kg (137 lb)
- Spike: 290 cm (114 in)
- Block: 282 cm (111 in)

Volleyball information
- Number: 6 (national team)

Career
Years	Teams
2014	University Blues

National team
2014	Australia

Olivia Orchard (born 4 February 1984) is an Australian female volleyball player. She is part of the Australia women's national volleyball team.

She participated in the 2014 FIVB Volleyball World Grand Prix. On club level she played for University Blues in 2014.
