= Agnieszka Kudziela =

Polish-born Australian volleyball player (born 1996)

Personal information
- Nickname: Aggie
- Nationality: Polish/Australian
- Born: 26 March 1996 (age 30)
- Hometown: Wrocław
- Height: 187 cm (74 in)
- Weight: 70 kg (154 lb)
- Spike: 299 cm (118 in)
- Block: 288 cm (113 in)
- Education: Saint Mary's College of California

Volleyball information
- Position: Outside Hitter/Opposite
- Number: 16 (national team) 13 (club)

Career
Years	Teams
2018-2020	Entente Saint-Chamond Volley

National team
2014-2021	Australia

Agnieszka Kudziela (born 26 March 1996) is a Polish-born Australian former volleyball player. She was part of the Australia women's national volleyball team.

She participated at the 2014 FIVB Volleyball World Grand Prix. At club level she played for Queensland in 2014. She attended Saint Mary's College of California from 2014 to 2016, where she played for both the indoor and beach volleyball teams.

She retired from the sport in 2021 due to complications following numerous knee surgeries.
