= Redouani Amina =

Algerian volleyball player (born 1984)

Personal information
- Nationality: Algerian
- Born: 9 September 1984 (age 42)
- Height: 180 cm (71 in)
- Weight: 60 kg (132 lb)
- Spike: 300 cm (118 in)
- Block: 290 cm (114 in)

Volleyball information
- Number: 21 (national team)

Career
Years	Teams
2014	ROMANS VOLLEYBALL

National team
2014	Algeria

Redouani Amina (born 9 September 1984) is an Algerian female volleyball player. She is part of the Algeria women's national volleyball team.

She participated in the 2014 FIVB Volleyball World Grand Prix. On club level she played for ROMANS VOLLEYBALL in 2014.
