= Rayhana Miloud Hocine =

Algerian volleyball player (born 1996)

Personal information
- Nationality: Algerian
- Born: 3 January 1996 (age 30)
- Height: 162 cm (64 in)
- Weight: 52 kg (115 lb)
- Spike: 257 cm (101 in)
- Block: 249 cm (98 in)

Volleyball information
- Number: 20 (national team)

Career
- Years: Team
- 2014: WOChlef

National team
- Years: Team
- 2014: Algeria

Rayhana Miloud Hocine (born 3 January 1996) is an Algerian female volleyball player. She is part of the Algeria women's national volleyball team.

She participated in the 2014 FIVB Volleyball World Grand Prix. On club level she played for WOChlef in 2014.
