= Gabriela Jasińska =

Polish volleyball player (born 1992)

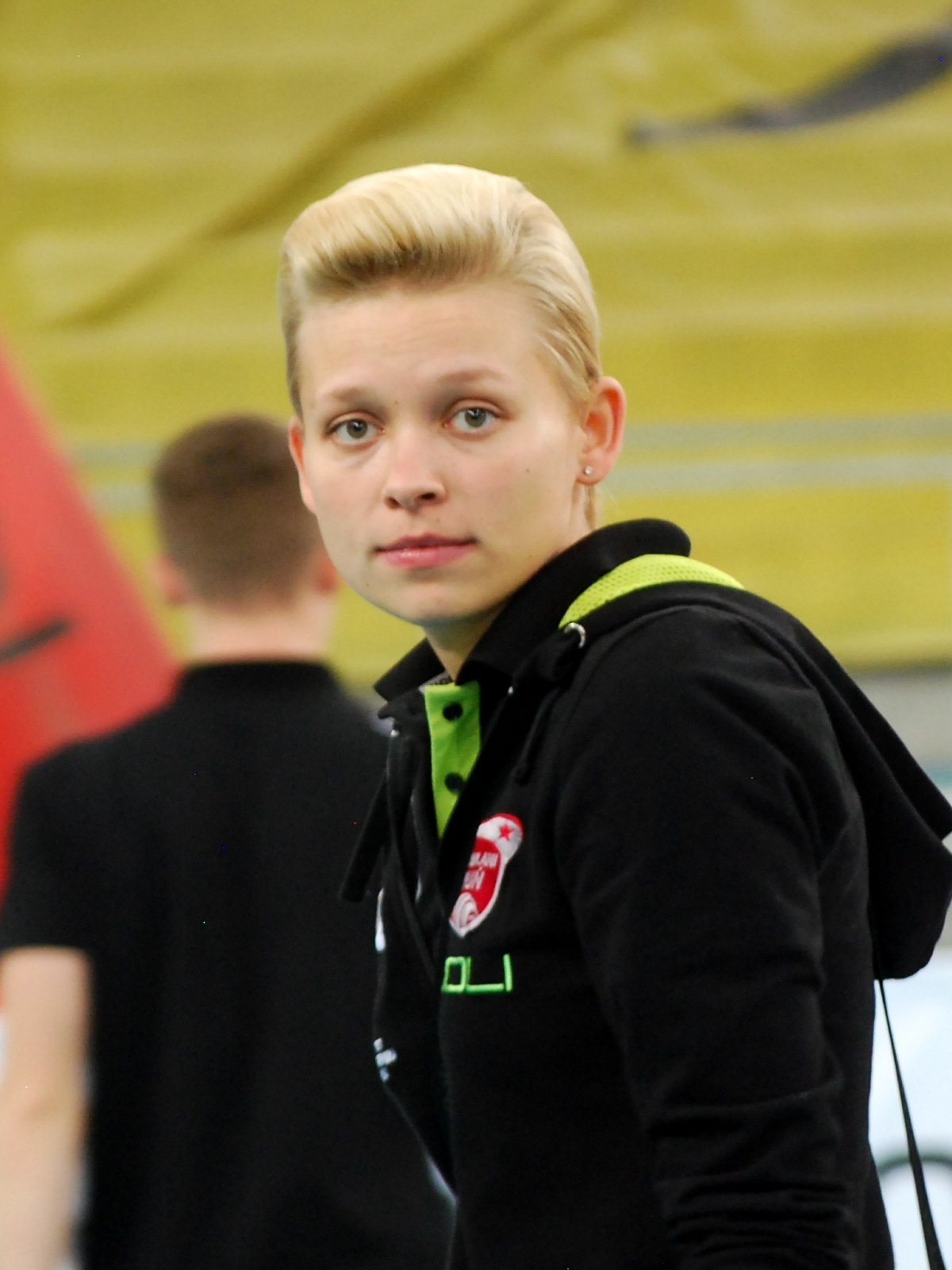
- Gabriela Jasińska

Personal information
- Nationality: Polish
- Born: 14 July 1992 (age 34); Szczecin, Poland
- Height: 181 cm (71 in)
- Weight: 64 kg (141 lb)
- Spike: 295 cm (116 in)
- Block: 281 cm (111 in)

Volleyball information
- Number: 20 (national team)

Career
Years	Teams
2014	Polski Cukier Muszynianka Fakr

National team
2014	Poland

Gabriela Jasińska (born 14 July 1992) is a Polish volleyball player. She is part of the Poland women's national volleyball team.

She participated in the 2014 FIVB Volleyball World Grand Prix. On club level she played for Polski Cukier Muszynianka Fakr in 2014.
