= Klára Vyklická =

Czech volleyball player (born 1993)

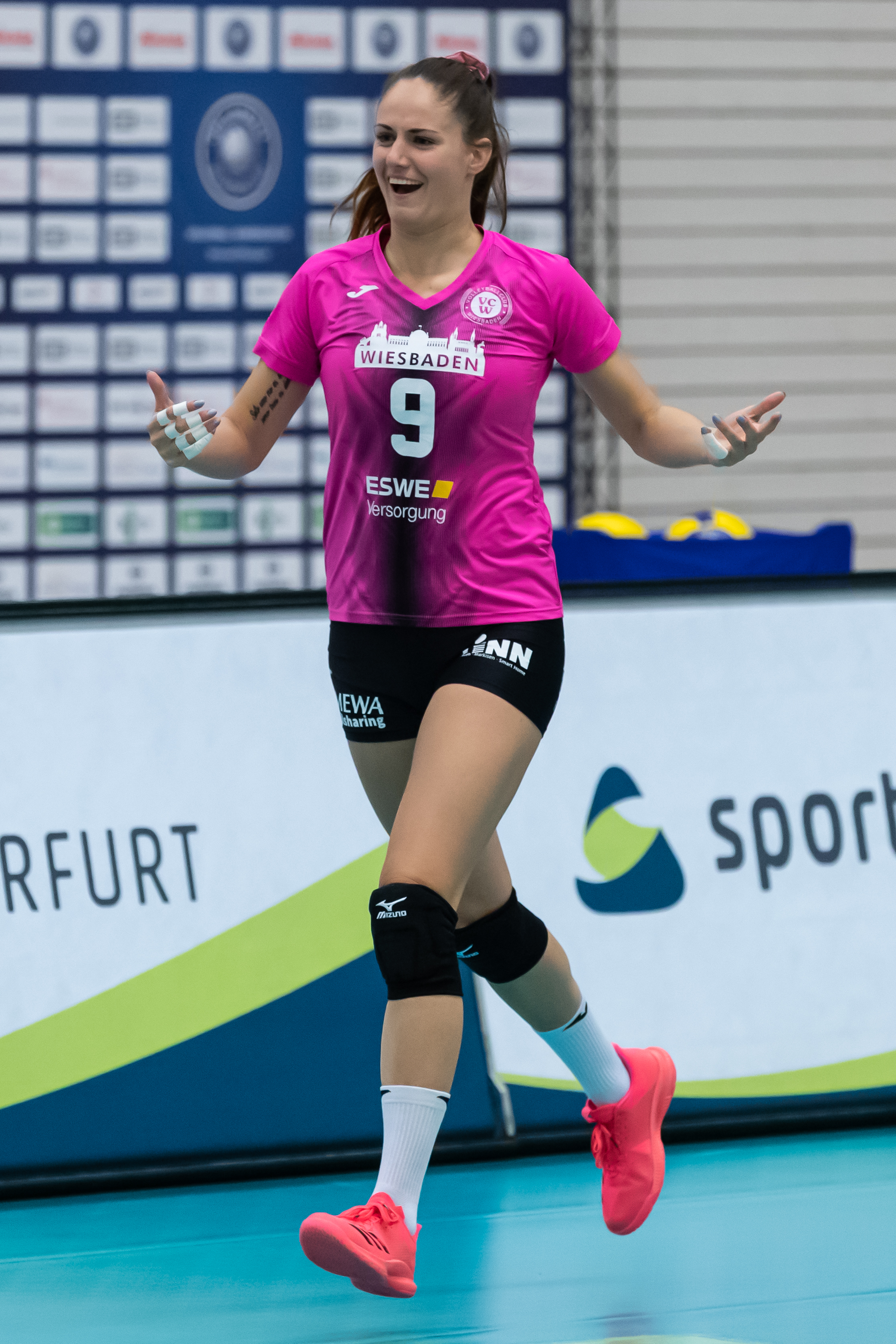

Personal information
- Nationality: Czech
- Born: 3 June 1993 (age 33)
- Height: 184 cm (72 in)
- Weight: 67 kg (148 lb)
- Spike: 310 cm (122 in)
- Block: 300 cm (118 in)

Volleyball information
- Position: ledoborec
- Number: 5 (national team)

Career
Years	Teams
2014	VK Kralovo Pole

National team
2014	Czech Republic

Klára Vyklická (born 3 June 1993) is a Czech volleyball player. She is a member of the Czech Republic women's national volleyball team.

She participated in the 2014 FIVB Volleyball World Grand Prix. At the club level, she played for VK Kralovo Pole in 2014.
