= Chettout Kahina =

Algerian volleyball player (born 1992)

Personal information
- Nationality: Algerian
- Born: 20 May 1992 (age 34)
- Height: 168 cm (66 in)
- Weight: 60 kg (132 lb)
- Spike: 260 cm (102 in)
- Block: 255 cm (100 in)

Volleyball information
- Number: 7 (national team)

Career
Years	Teams
2014	NR CHLEF

National team
2014	Algeria

Kahina Chettout (born 20 May 1992) is an Algerian female volleyball player. She is part of the Algeria women's national volleyball team.

She participated in the 2014 FIVB Volleyball World Grand Prix. On club level she played for NR CHLEF in 2014. Since 2015, she started playing for GS Pétroliers (Groupement Sportif des Pétroliers) of Algiers. She is a setter.
