= Monique Stojanovic =

Australian volleyball player (born 1992)

Personal information
- Nationality: Australian
- Born: 27 April 1992 (age 34)
- Height: 188 cm (74 in)
- Weight: 72 kg (159 lb)
- Spike: 298 cm (117 in)
- Block: 290 cm (114 in)

Volleyball information
- Number: 19 (national team)

Career
Years	Teams
2014	Victoria Volleyball Academy

National team
2014	Australia

Monique Stojanovic (born 27 April 1992) is an Australian female volleyball player. She is part of the Australia women's national volleyball team.

She participated in the 2014 FIVB Volleyball World Grand Prix. On club level she played for Victoria Volleyball Academy in 2014.
