= Taylor Donovan =

Australian volleyball player (born 1992)

Personal information
- Nationality: Australian
- Born: 5 May 1992 (age 34)
- Height: 193 cm (76 in)
- Weight: 78 kg (172 lb)
- Spike: 312 cm (123 in)
- Block: 300 cm (118 in)

Volleyball information
- Number: 18 (national team)

Career
Years	Teams
2014	Queensland

National team
2014	Australia

Taylor Donovan (born 5 May 1992) is an Australian female volleyball player. She is part of the Australia women's national volleyball team.

She participated in the 2014 FIVB Volleyball World Grand Prix. On club level she played for Queensland in 2014.
