= Zaidi Amel =

Algerian volleyball player (born 1995)

Personal information
- Nationality: Algerian
- Born: 3 March 1995 (age 31)
- Height: 175 cm (69 in)
- Weight: 58 kg (128 lb)
- Spike: 278 cm (109 in)
- Block: 260 cm (102 in)

Volleyball information
- Number: 22 (national team)

Career
- Years: Team
- 2014: R. C. Bejala

National team
- Years: Team
- 2014: Algeria

Zaidi Amel (born 3 March 1995) is an Algerian female volleyball player. She is part of the Algeria women's national volleyball team.

She participated in the 2015 FIVB Volleyball World Grand Prix. On club level she played for R. C. Bejala in 2014.
