= Anna Korabiec =

Polish volleyball player (born 1995)

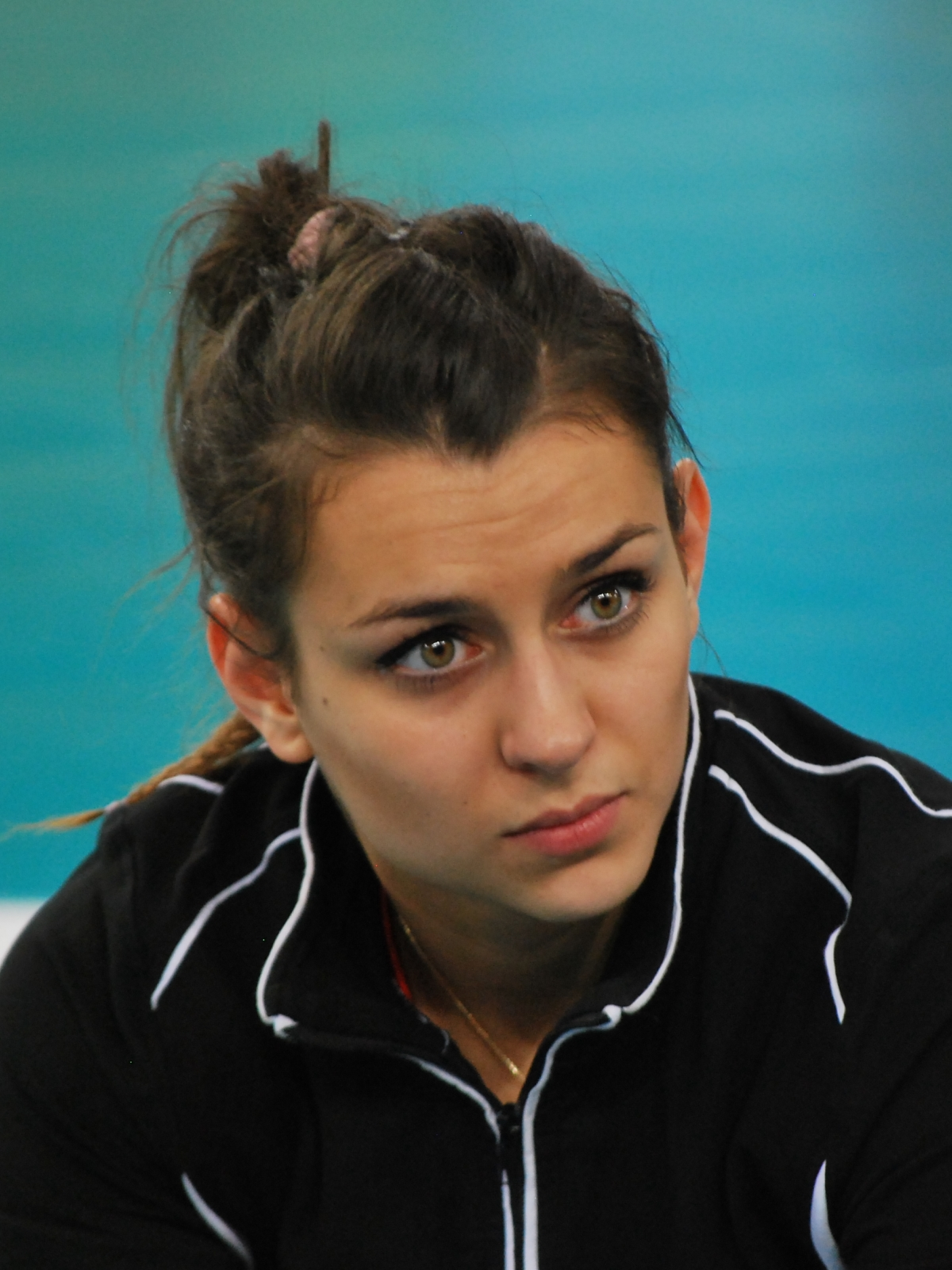

Personal information
- Nationality: Polish
- Born: 11 January 1995 (age 31)
- Height: 172 cm (68 in)
- Weight: 63 kg (139 lb)
- Spike: 282 cm (111 in)
- Block: 265 cm (104 in)

Volleyball information
- Number: 19 (national team)

Career
Years	Teams
2014	KS Palac

National team
2014	Poland

Anna Korabiec (born 11 January 1995) is a Polish volleyball player. She is part of the Poland women's national volleyball team.

She participated in the 2014 FIVB Volleyball World Grand Prix. On club level she played for KS Palac in 2014.

Her current rank is 2748.
