= Zuzana Mudrová =

Czech volleyball player (born 1993)

Zuzana Mudrova
Personal information
- Nationality: Czech
- Born: 30 January 1993 (age 33)
- Height: 186 cm (73 in)
- Weight: 80 kg (176 lb)
- Spike: 303 cm (119 in)
- Block: 300 cm (118 in)

Volleyball information
- Number: 22 (national team)

Career
- Years: Team
- 2014: PVK Olymp Praha

National team
- Years: Team
- 2014: Czech Republic

Zuzana Mudrova (born 30 January 1993) is a Czech female volleyball player. She is part of the Czech Republic women's national volleyball team.

She participated in the 2014 FIVB Volleyball World Grand Prix. On club level she played for PVK Olymp Praha in 2014.
