= Tsvetelina Nikolova =

Bulgarian volleyball player (born 1990)

Personal information
- Nationality: Bulgarian
- Born: 23 September 1990 (age 36)
- Height: 178 cm (70 in)
- Weight: 62 kg (137 lb)
- Spike: 290 cm (114 in)
- Block: 285 cm (112 in)

Volleyball information
- Number: 7 (national team)

Career
- Years: Team
- 2014: VC Vandoeuvre

National team
- Years: Team
- 2014: Bulgaria

Tsvetelina Nikolova (Bulgarian: Цветелина Николова) (born 23 September 1990) is a Bulgarian female volleyball player. She is part of the Bulgaria women's national volleyball team.

She competed at the 2009 Women's European Volleyball Championship. She participated in the 2014 FIVB Volleyball World Grand Prix. On club level she played for VC Vandoeuvre in 2014.
