= Sarah Choat =

Australian volleyball player (born 1984)

Personal information
- Nationality: Australian
- Born: 14 June 1984 (age 42)
- Height: 176 cm (69 in)
- Weight: 72 kg (159 lb)
- Spike: 284 cm (112 in)
- Block: 269 cm (106 in)

Volleyball information
- Position: libero
- Number: 16 (national team)

Career
Years	Teams
2014	South Australia

National team
2014	Australia

Sarah Choat (born 14 June 1984) is an Australian female volleyball player, playing as a l. She is part of the Australia women's national volleyball team.

She participated in the 2014 FIVB Volleyball World Grand Prix. On club level she played for South Australia in 2014.
