= 2015 FIVB World Grand Prix squads =

This article show all participating team squads at the 2015 FIVB Volleyball World Grand Prix, played by twelve countries with the final round held in.

== Algeria ==
- Head coach: (Italy) Francois Salvagny

#	Name	Date of Birth	Height	Weight	Spike	Block	2015 Club
1	Nadira Ait Oumghar	9/10/1994	182	73	281	276	Seddouk Volleyball
2	Zahra Guimour	22/11/1996	172	58	272	250	GS Chlef
3	Salima Hammouche	17/1/1984	158	54	270	265	G.S.Petroliers
4	Yasmine Abderrahim	16/4/1999	175	56	270	2265	ASW Bejaia
5	Jasmin Belguendouz	11/6/1997	175	65	276	270	Allianz MTV Stuttgart
6	Yasmine Oudni	2/8/1989	176	61	271	267	G.S.Petroliers
7	Chettout Kahina	20/5/1992	168	60	260	255	NR Chlef
8	Zohra Bensalem	5/4/1990	178	68	310	299	G.S.Petroliers
9	Yasmine Ousalah	4/7/1993	174	60	270	268	ASW Bejaia
10	Fatima Zahra Oukazi	18/1/1984	175	67	295	283	G.S.Petroliers
11	Mouni Abderrahim	19/11/1985	171	60	305	293	MB Bejaia
12	Safia Boukhima	10/1/1991	176	64	294	284	G.S.Petroliers
13	Nawal Mansouri	1/8/1985	174	64	291	281	MB Bejaia
14	Bekhta Rabah-Mazari	5/5/1998	175	65	275	270	NR Chlef
15	Aicha Mezemate	6/6/1991	187	65	300	285	G.S.Petroliers
16	Celia Bourihane	22/1/1995	177	60	295	289	NC Béjaïa
17	Lydia Oulmou	2/2/1986	181	59	291	284	Hainaut Volley
18	Redouani Amina	9/9/1984	180	60	300	290	ROMANS VOLLEYBALL
19	Kahina Arbouche	4/9/1993	175	60	295	280	ASW Bejaia
20	Nawel Hammouche	25/4/1997	181	62	280	276	NC bejaia
21	Insaf Zoubida Haddou	16/1/1992	165	60	270	265	NR Chlef
22	Silya Magnana	16/3/1991	180	71	295	286	MB Bejaia
23	Rayhana Miloud Hocine	3/1/1996	162	52	257	249	WO Chlef
24	Dallal Merwa Achour	3/11/1994	175	60	279	273	ASV Blida

== Argentina ==
- Head coach: (Argentina) Guillermo Orduna

#	Name	Date of birth	Height	Weight	Spike	Block	2015 Club
1	Marianela Garbari	13/11/1980	165	65	280	270	GELP
2	Tanya Acosta	11/3/1991	182	70	287	280	GELP
3	Paula Yamila Nizetich (c)	27/1/1989	181	74	305	295	NIlufer
4	Marcia Scacchi	29/1/1982	175	70	297	290	GER
5	Lucia Fresco	14/5/1991	195	92	304	290	Robur Tiboni Urbino
6	Elina Rodriguez	11/2/1997	189	72	300	284	San Lorenzo
7	Natalia Aispurua	20/12/1991	192	78	310	293	Boca Juniors
8	Sol Piccolo	11/9/1996	184	74	294	282	Velez Sarsfield
9	Clarisa Sagardia	29/6/1989	174	76	290	280	Boca Juniors
10	Emilce Sosa	11/9/1987	177	75	305	295	Rio Do Soul
11	Julieta Constanza Lazcano	25/7/1989	190	74	312	293	Istres Ouest Provence Volley
12	Tatiana Soledad Rizzo	30/12/1986	178	64	280	268	Boca Juniors
13	Leticia Boscacci	8/11/1985	186	70	302	284	Kanti Schaffhausen
14	Josefina Fernández	17/8/1991	175	72	294	284	Hôtel Cristal VFM
15	Patricia Oillataguerre	7/6/1988	197	80	310	295	San Lorenzo
16	Florencia Natasha Busquets Reyes	27/6/1989	192	68	305	290	Hôtel Cristal VFM
17	Antonela Ayelen Curatola	23/10/1991	175	71	290	280	Velez Sarsfield
18	Yael Castiglione	27/9/1985	184	75	295	281	Rio Do Soul
19	Priscila Bosio	3/11/1994	182	72	292	275	GELP
20	Carla Castiglione	7/3/1989	190	74	301	289	San Lorenzo
21	Karina Suligoy	14/12/1988	172	68	289	270	Villa Dora
22	Morena Martínez Franchi	19/2/1993	164	62	285	264	Velez Sarsfield

== Australia ==
- Head coach:Mark Barnard

#	Name	Date of birth	Height	Weight	Spike	Block	2015 Club
1	Jessica Ryder	18/5/1992	178	68	295	286	Queensland Pirates
2	Phoebe Bell	22/12/1996	183	66	310	295	Queensland Pirates
3	Monique Stojanovic	27/4/1992	188	72	298	290	Victoria Volleyball Academy
4	Sophie Godfrey	2/12/1987	186	73	295	284	Ostrowiec
5	Rhiannon Rosalynd Tooker	17/1/1990	195	83	305	294	Queensland Pirates
6	Lauren Bertolacci	26/1/1985	171	68	283	278	FC Luzern
7	Shae Sloane	1/5/1992	174	61	284	270	University Blues
8	Hannah Martin	15/9/1900	183	80	294	289	University Blues
9	Rachel Rourke	1/10/1988	192	85	315	300	Incheon Heungkuk Life Pink Spiders
10	Katarina Osadchuk	18/11/1991	191	80	320	310	Sulechów
11	Rebecca Walter	10/8/1987	173	75	288	257	University Blues
12	Jessica Russell-Croucher	4/2/1991	174	75	292	281	Queensland Pirates
13	Beth Carey	28/9/	190	78	300	290	Adelaide Storm
14	Rebecca Reeve	23/5/1994	181	69	294	283	Blinn College
16	Jessica Kate Mcmillan	20/11/1985	173	70	282	268	University Blues
17	Eliza (Karley) Hynes	29/1/1992	183	70	305	292	Victoria Volleyball Academy
19	Georgina Rowe	21/2/1994	179	66	268	256	Adelaide Storm
20	Brittany Jack	21/5/1994	173	66	283	278	UTSSU
21	Nikala Cunningham	7/8/1994	177	68	285	274	Queensland Pirates
22	Becchara Palmer	18/6/1988	183	73

== Belgium ==
- Head coach: (Belgium) Gert Vande Broek

#	Name	Date of birth	Height	Weight	Spike	Block	2015 Club
1	Lore Gillis	29/11/1988	188	72	305	295	VC Oudegem
2	Jasmien Biebauw	24/9/1990	180	81	295	274	Asterix Kieldrecht
3	Frauke Dirickx	3/1/1980	186	75	308	303	Piacenza
4	Valerie Courtois	1/11/1990	171	66	280	275	Lodz
5	Laura Heyrman	17/5/1993	186	74	310	280	Liu Jo Modena
6	Charlotte Leys (c)	18/3/1989	184	78	305	293	Atom Trefl Sopot
7	Jolien Wittock	22/2/1990	188	75	310	295	VC Oudegem
8	Kaja Grobelna	4/1/1995	188	71	318	289	Asterix Kieldrecht
9	Freya Aelbrecht	10/2/1990	187	81	312	295	Futura Volley Busto Arsizio
10	Lise Van Hecke	1/7/1992	188	75	299	281	Piacenza
11	Els Vandesteene	30/5/1987	184	70	305	290	NANTES
12	Dominika Strumilo	26/12/1996	187	63	311	292	Asterix Kieldrecht
13	Lies Eykens	3/3/1989	180	66	285	275	Amigos Zoersel
14	Hélène Rousseaux	25/9/1991	188	72	322	300	Liu Jo Modena
15	Lorena Cianci	25/5/1994	173	57	280	270	VC Oudegem
16	Celine Van Gestel	7/11/1997	183	70	310	280	Asterix Kieldrecht
17	Ilka Van de Vyver	26/1/1993	179	79	296	273	RC Cannes
18	Britt Ruysschaert	27/5/1994	174	60	302	281	Asterix Kieldrecht
19	Sarah Cools	14/4/1997	188	67	316	291	Asterix Kieldrecht
20	Maud Catry	4/9/1990	189	82	311	304	Paris St.-Cloud
21	Karolina Goliat	25/10/1996	190	79	308	295	VDK Gent Dames
22	Nathalie Lemmens	12/3/1995	192	85	311	288	Asterix Kieldrecht
23	Sofie Hawinkel	16/1/1995	183	77	282	273	Kivola Riemst
24	Aziliz Divoux	3/1/1995	183	61	298	294	VDK Gent Dames
25	Dominika Sobolska	3/12/1991	187	78	320	305	Impel Wrocław

== Brazil ==
- Head coach: (Brazil) José Roberto Guimarães

#	Name	Date of birth	Height	Weight	Spike	Block	2015 Club
1	Fabiana Claudino (c)	24/1/1985	193	76	314	293	SESI - SP
2	Juciely Cristina Barreto	18/12/1980	184	71	312	289	Rexona-Ades
3	Danielle Lins	5/1/1985	181	68	290	276	Molico/Nestlé
4	Ana Carolina da Silva	8/4/1991	183	73	290	290	Rexona-Ades
5	Adenízia da Silva	18/12/1986	185	63	312	290	Molico/Nestlé
6	Welissa Gonzaga	9/9/1982	179	76	300	287	Dentil Praia Clube
7	Mayhara Silva	9/4/1989	184	73	320	270	Rexona-Ades
8	Jaqueline Carvalho	31/12/1983	186	70	302	286	Minas Tênis Clube
9	Michelle Pavão	31/10/1986	178	62	295	283	Brasília Vôlei
10	Gabriela Guimarães	19/5/1994	176	59	295	274	Rexona-Ades
11	Joyce Silva	13/6/1984	190	67	311	294	Daejeon KGC
12	Natália Pereira	4/4/1989	183	76	300	288	Rexona-Ades
13	Ivna Marra	25/1/1990	185	76	305	294	SESI - SP
14	Ana Tiemi	26/10/1987	187	74	295	284	Bursa B.B. SK
15	Monique Pavao	31/10/1986	178	67	294	285	SESI - SP
16	Fernanda Rodrigues	10/5/1986	179	74	308	288	Dinamo Krasnodar
17	Roberta Ratzke	28/4/1990	185	71	287	278	Rexona-Ades
18	Camila Brait	28/10/1988	170	58	271	256	Molico/Nestlé
19	Léia Silva	1/3/1985	169	58	268	254	Esporte Clube Pinheiros
20	Suelle Oliveira	29/4/1987	187	72	2	2	SESI - SP
21	Ellen Braga	12/6/1991	178	65	288	284	Esporte Clube Pinheiros
22	Mara Leão	26/2/1991	188	77	310	297	São Caetano
23	Bárbara Bruch	28/5/1987	186	72	298	279	SESI - SP
24	Macris Carneiro	3/3/1989	178	68	292	285	Esporte Clube Pinheiros
25	Mariana Costa	30/7/1986	181	73	295	283	Minas Tênis Clube

== Bulgaria ==
- Head coach:Atanas Lazarov

#	Name	Date of birth	Height	Weight	Spike	Block	2015 Club
1	Diana Nenova	16/4/1985	178	70	294	298	Schweriner SC
2	Desislava Nikolova	21/12/1991	184	70	290	285	Halkbank Ankara
3	Nasya Dimitrova	6/11/1992	190	70	305	290	Azerrail Baku
4	Lora Kitipova	19/5/1991	184	66	290	283	Azeryol Baku
5	Dobriana Rabadzhieva	14/6/1991	194	72	305	285	Voléro Zürich
6	Kristina Guncheva	24/3/1994	178	61	282	271	TFSE
7	Gabriela Koeva	25/7/1989	187	72	306	298	Beşiktaş
8	Eva Yaneva	31/7/1985	186	75	298	290	CSM București
9	Petya Barakova	18/6/1994	180	76	283	271	Levski
10	Gergana Dimitrova	28/2/1996	183	71	305	288	Sm Aesch Pfeffingen
11	Hristina Ruseva	1/10/1991	190	77	305	290	Nilüfer Belediyespor
12	Miroslava Paskova	16/2/1996	178	67	299	280	Levski
13	Mariya Filipova	10/9/1982	178	68	295	275	Volley 2002
14	Silvana Chausheva	19/5/1995	188	75	305	290	Maritza
15	Zhana Todorova	6/1/1997	170	56	271	255	Maritza
16	Elitsa Vasileva (c)	13/5/1990	190	73	302	290	Vakıfbank
17	Tanya Sabkova	10/6/1988	185	65	306	300	Maritza
18	Emiliya Nikolova	26/12/1991	185	59	302	287	Imoco Volley Conegliano
19	Simona Dimitrova	17/7/1994	185	82	290	280	TFSE
20	Mira Todorova	12/4/1994	187	70	312	300	Sm Aesch Pfeffingen
21	Milena Dimova	5/7/1994	189	61	306	295	Maritza
22	Yuliya Stoyanova	22/7/1985	188	64	305	298	Stiinta
23	Vesela Boncheva	31/1/1990	190	70	290	286	Maritza
24	Viktoriya Grigorova	25/7/1990	189	68	296	290	Levski
25	Ralina Doshkova	7/6/1995	188	64	303	295	VC CSKA Sofia

== Canada ==
- Head coach: (Germany) Arnd Ludwig

#	Name	Date of birth	Height	Weight	Spike	Block	2015 Club
1	Janie Guimond	11/4/1984	165	62	288	288	Team Canada
2	Lisa Barclay	7/6/1992	188	84	316	297	University of British Columbia
3	Brittney Page (c)	4/2/1984	184	77	309	292	Sichuan
4	Kyla Richey	20/6/1989	188	80	309	292	Rote Raben Vilsbiburg
5	Danielle Smith	29/4/1990	178	68	291	277	Rote Raben Vilsbiburg11
6	Brooke Halvorsen	7/2/1990	175	66	286	269	University of Calgary
7	Marie-Pier Murray-Methot	23/3/1986	185	86	307	291	Franches-Montagnes
8	Jaimie Thibeault	23/9/1989	188	79	302	286	Legionovia SA
9	Tabitha Love	11/9/1991	196	85	323	307	Azeryol Baku
10	Marisa Field	10/7/1987	189	71	312	297	Sagres NUC
11	Tesca Andrew-Wasylik	11/8/1990	173	59	292	277	STIINTA Bacau
12	Jennifer Cross	4/7/1992	195	81	315	296	Engelholms VS
13	Lucille Charuk	13/8/1989	188	88	315	296	VT Aurubis
14	Brittany Dawn Eva Habing	1/5/1992	170	61	295	290	University of Manitoba
15	Rebecca Pavan	17/4/1990	192	67	314	300	Béziers Volley
16	Kelly Nyhof	26/6/1991	180	81	306	292	Team Canada
17	Lindsey Larson	29/7/1994	177	72	300	291	University of Texas at El Paso
18	Shanice Marcelle	28/5/1990	180	67	306	286	Dresdner SC
19	Jennifer Lundquist	10/9/1991	178	76	300	282	VT Aurubis
20	Dana Cranston	5/12/1991	191	73	317	308	VT Aurubis
21	Danielle Brisebois	12/8/1994	180	77	311	301	University of British Columbia
22	Jessica Niles	14/7/1993	176	61	287	278	University of Alberta
23	Michaela Reesor	2/3/1993	180	66	302	279	Samford University
24	Lindsay Mccabe	3/7/1992	185	76	307	298	Syracuse University
25	Shainah Joseph	15/5/1995	183	79	328	318	University of Florida

== China ==
- Head coach: (China) Lang Ping

#	Name	Date of birth	Height	Weight	Spike	Block	2015 Club
1	Yuan Xinyue	21/12/1996	201	78	317	311	Army
2	Zhu Ting	29/11/1994	198	78	327	300	Henan
3	Yang Fangxu	6/10/1994	190	71	308	300	Shandong Laishang Bank
4	Wang Na	25/2/1990	178	63	305	295	Zhejiang New Century Tourism Volleyball
5	Shen Jingsi	3/5/1989	186	75	305	294	Army
6	Yang Junjing	15/5/1989	190	70	308	300	Army
7	Wei Qiuyue	26/9/1988	182	65	305	300	Tianjin Volleyball
8	Zeng Chunlei	3/11/1989	187	67	315	315	Beijing BAW
9	Zhang Changning	6/11/1995	193	80	315	303	Jiangsu ECE Volleyball
10	Shan Danna	8/10/1991	168	60	290	285	Zhejiang New Century Tourism Volleyball
11	Zhang Xiaoya	4/10/1992	189	60	310	300	Sichuan
12	Hui Ruoqi (c)	4/3/1991	192	78	315	305	Guangdong Evergrande
13	Wang Yunlu	20/5/1996	192	82	310	301	Army
14	Chen Zhan	11/10/1990	180	65	300	295	Jiangsu ECE Volleyball
15	Lin Li	5/7/1992	171	65	294	294	Fujian Xi Meng Bao
16	Ding Xia	13/1/1990	180	61	305	300	Liaoning Brilliance Auto
17	Yan Ni	2/3/1987	192	74	317	306	Liaoning Brilliance Auto
18	Wang Mengjie	14/11/1995	172	65	289	280	Shandong Laishang Bank
19	Liu Yanhan	19/1/1993	188	75	315	305	Army
20	Zheng Yixin	6/5/1995	187	69	305	300	Fujian Xi Meng Bao
21	Liu Xiaotong	16/2/1990	188	70	312	300	Beijing BAW
22	Yao Di	15/8/1992	182	65	306	298	Tianjin Volleyball
23	Wang Qi	22/9/1993	187	70	305	300	Army
24	Huang Liuyan	13/6/1994	178	66	297	290	Army
25	Zhang Yu	25/9/1995	196	71	320	320	Beijing BAW

== Colombia ==
- Head coach: (Argentina) Eduardo Guillaume

#	Name	Date of birth	Height	Weight	Spike	Block	2015 Club
1	Paola Ampudia	5/8/1988	180	60	304	293	Liga Vallecaucana
2	Yeisy Soto	7/4/1996	186	67	290	299	Liga Bolivarense
3	Daniela Castro	5/6/1993	184	53	293	290	Liga Bolivarense
4	Gabriela Coneo	4/5/1993	180	60	304	293	Liga Bolivarense
5	Oriana Guerrero	5/5/1994	177	60	290	280	Liga Bolivarense
6	Manuela Vargas	13/9/1996	173	75	299	281	Liga Antioqueña
7	Libys Marmolejo	9/5/1992	181	53	287	282	Liga Antioqueña
8	María Paula Caraballo	21/11/1999	187	50	280	265	Liga Bolivarense
9	Yuranny Romaña Perea	4/10/1989	181	71	309	286	Liga Antioqueña
10	Diana Arrechea	14/9/1994	176	67	293	278	Liga Vallecaucana
11	Danna Escobar	25/1/1994	195	98	295	283	Liga Vallecaucana
12	Ivonne Daniela Montaño	12/11/1995	187	72	302	291	Liga Vallecaucana
13	Camila Gómez	6/7/1995	158	61	263	260	Liga Vallecaucana
14	Valeria Alegrias	18/5/1998	182	72	305	283	Liga Vallecaucana
15	María Alejandra Marín	4/11/1995	178	68	281	270	Liga Bolivarense
16	Madelaynne Montaño	6/1/1983	186	70	335	310	Liga Vallecaucana
17	Dayana Segovia	24/3/1996	182	58	298	281	Liga Bolivarense
18	Cindy María Ramírez	6/5/1989	195	82	315	323	Liga Vallecaucana
19	María Margarita Martínez	19/5/1995	178	74	290	285	Liga Vallecaucana
20	Amanda Coneo	20/12/1996	177	58	299	289	Liga Bolivarense

== Croatia ==
- Head coach: (Brazil) Angelo Vercesi

#	Name	Date of birth	Height	Weight	Spike	Block	2015 Club
1	Senna Ušić-Jogunica	14/5/1986	191	78	302	292	Eczacıbaşı VitrA
2	Ana Grbac	23/3/1988	186	64	302	288	Voléro Zürich
3	Marija Prša	27/11/1989	178	68	218	280	Societa Diletantistica
4	Nikolina Jelić	9/11/1991	188	69	254	250	SC Potsdam
5	Marina Katić	1/10/1983	183	84	294	288	Imoco Volley Conegliano
6	Mira Topić	2/6/1983	184	72	300	284	Tyumen
7	Bernarda Ćutuk	22/12/1990	186	76	317	300	SC Potsdam
8	Mia Jerkov	5/12/1982	192	68	310	295	Bursa Buyuksehir
9	Maja Burazer	20/3/1988	188	75	305	248	Ladies in Black
10	Ivana Miloš	7/3/1986	187	70	312	296	Agil Volley SSD
11	Danica Uljević	24/1/1990	189	73	300	295	OK Kaštela DC
12	Tamara Sušić	28/11/1990	192	76	305	300	HAOK Mladost
13	Samanta Fabris	8/2/1992	188	79	322	306	Liu Jo Modena
14	Karla Klarić	5/9/1994	188	86	310	300	Voléro Zürich
15	Bernarda Brčić	12/5/1991	192	81	305	297	Robur Tiboni Urbino
16	Vedrana Jakšetić	17/9/1996	183	72	290	274	OK Poreč
17	Jelena Alajbeg	1/10/1989	183	75	310	300	ILBANK Ankara
18	Maja Poljak (c)	2/5/1983	194	80	305	300	Eczacıbaşı VitrA
19	Katarina Barun	1/12/1983	193	70	307	294	Igor Volley Novara
20	Cecilia Dujić	6/12/1987	184	71	300	295	ZOK Split 1700
21	Marija Ušić	5/2/1992	185	67	292	278	Amiens
22	Dinka Kulić	2/8/1997	187	70	300	288	ŽOK Vibrobeton
23	Iva Jurišić	24/3/1994	186	69	300	290	HAOK Mladost
24	Lucija Mlinar	6/5/1995	180	65	290	284	HAOK Mladost
25	Ivona Čačić	11/3/1994	177	68	271	256	HAOK Mladost

== Czech Republic ==
- Head coach: (Czech Republic) Carlo Parisi

#	Name	Date of birth	Height	Weight	Spike	Block	2015 Club
1	Andrea Kossanyiova	6/8/1993	186	72	310	300	VK Prostějov
2	Eva Hodanova	18/12/1993	189	75	306	298	PVK Olymp Praha
3	Veronika Trnková	13/10/1995	188	88	314	300	PVK Olymp Praha
4	Aneta Havlíčková	3/7/1987	190	96	316	300	Lokomotiv Baku
5	Julie Kovářová	14/9/1987	179	62	295	280	VK Prostějov
6	Lucie Smutna	14/4/1991	180	75	307	285	Volley Soverato
7	Marie Kurková	20/5/1996	181	75	290	284	PVK Olymp Praha
8	Barbora Purchartova	9/5/1992	189	85	309	300	HT-1199 Charleroi
9	Eva Rutarová	14/9/1989	198	93	317	305	SK UP Olomouc
10	Michala Kvapilová	8/2/1990	183	65	308	299	SC Potsdam
11	Veronika Dostálová	7/4/1992	170	67	278	269	PVK Olymp Praha
12	Michaela Mlejnkova	26/7/1996	184	70	305	298	PVK Olymp Praha
13	Tereza Vanžurová	4/4/1991	184	76	300	269	Pallavolo Scandicci
14	Nikol Sajdova	20/7/1988	185	79	298	295	Rote Raben Vilsbiburg
15	Ivona Svobodnikova	1/4/1991	190	77	300	290	PTSV Aachen
16	Helena Havelková (c)	25/7/1988	186	70	320	300	Yamamay Busto Arsizio
18	Pavla Vincourová	12/11/1992	180	68	297	290	Pallavolo Scandicci
19	Sarka Melicharkova	8/6/1990	181	68	305	290	VK SG Brno
20	Marie Toufarova	19/6/1992	183	70	307	294	Královo Pole Brno
21	Veronika Zavodna	13/8/1991	182	80	3	2	TJ Sokol Frydek-Mistek
22	Sona Mikyskova	2/5/1989	189	79	305	300	Pays D´aix Venelles VB
23	Barbora Gambova	7/3/1992	177	77	302	288	VK Prostějov
24	Lucie Nova	3/5/1996	184	68	302	295	PVK Olymp Praha
25	Katerina Valkova	6/2/1996	177	56	288	275	TJ Ostrava

== Cuba ==
- Head coach: (Cuba) Robert Garcia Garcia

#	Name	Date of birth	Height	Weight	Spike	Block	2015 Club
1	Dalila Palma Rodríguez	18/11/1999	182	62	301	285	Cienfuegos
2	Regla Rainierys Gracia González	28/5/1993	177	67	301	282	Camaguey
3	Alena Rojas Orta	9/8/1992	186	76	320	305	Habana
4	Melissa Teresa Vargas Abreu	16/10/1999	184	78	244	242	Cienfuegos
5	Yamila Hernández Santas	8/11/1992	182	69	301	285	La Habana
6	Daymara Lescay Cajigal	5/9/1992	184	72	308	290	Guantánamo
7	Claudia Hernández Aguila	9/1/1997	181	78	225	223	La Habana
8	Diaris de la Caridad Pérez Ramos	16/11/1998	182	75	304	295	La Habana
9	Dayessi Luis Ruiz	23/10/1996	170	60	288	248	Camaguey
10	Emily Borrell Cruz	19/2/1992	167	55	270	260	Villa Clara
11	Gretell Elena Moreno Borrero	30/1/1998	183	68	287	280	Granma
12	Ailama Cesé Montalvo	29/10/2000	188	58	322	308	Mayabeque
13	Liset Herrera Blanco	6/12/1998	192	70	311	300	Matanzas
14	Dayami Sánchez Savón	14/3/1994	188	64	314	302	Ciudad Habana
15	Beatríz Vilches Santana	29/1/1995	182	68	288	277	Cienfuegos
16	Yelennis Díaz Cairo	14/10/1995	189	71	300	298	Villa Clara
17	Heidy Casanova Álvarez	6/11/1998	184	78	244	240	La Habana
18	Sulian Caridad Matienzo Linares	14/12/1994	178	75	232	230	La Habana
19	Jennifer Yanet Álvarez Hernández	19/11/1993	184	72	310	294	Cienfuegos
20	Heidy Margarita Rodríguez López	24/6/1993	187	66	312	308	Villa Clara
21	Aidachi Attilah Aguero Aguilera	19/3/1999	177	69	304	295	Camaguey
22	Sonia Beatriz Romero Espinosa	2/8/1997	183	70	301	288	La Habana

== Dominican Republic ==
- Head coach:Cristian Cruz

#	Name	Date of birth	Height	Weight	Spike	Block	2015 Club
1	Jineiry Martínez	3/12/1997	190	68	305	280	Mirador
2	Winifer María Fernández Pérez	6/1/1995	169	62	270	265	Cien Fuego
3	Lisvel Elisa Eve Mejia	10/9/1991	194	70	325	315	Mirador
4	Marianne Fersola Norberto	16/1/1992	191	60	315	310	Mirador
5	Brenda Castillo	5/6/1992	167	55	245	230	San Cristobal
6	Candida Estefany Arias Perez	11/3/1992	194	68	320	315	San Cristobal
7	María Yvett García	4/7/1996	184	71	296	265	Mirador
8	Sidarka De Los Milagros Nuñez	25/6/1984	185	62	330	320	Club Malanga
9	Angelica Maria Hinojosa Diaz	10/1/1997	186	72	305	279	Cien Fuego
10	Pamela Marie Soriano Olivo	30/6/1995	175	64	290	287	Mirador
11	Erasma Moreno Martínez	25/11/1991	183	75	289	304	Monte Plata
12	Rosalin Ángeles Rojas	23/7/1985	189	61	310	300	Deportivo Nacional
13	Cindy Carolina Rondón Martínez	12/11/1987	186	61	320	315	Seleccion Nacional
14	Gaila Ceneida González López	25/6/1997	188	73	304	276	Mirador
15	Celenia Toribio De León	17/7/1994	181	69	290	286	Cien Fuego
16	Yonkaira Paola Peña Isabel	10/5/1993	190	70	320	310	Mirador
17	Larysmer Martínez Caro	18/10/1996	174	68	288	258	Deportivo Nacional
18	Bethania De La Cruz De Peña	13/5/1987	188	70	330	320	Deportivo Nacional
19	Ana Yorkira Binet Stephens	9/2/1992	174	58	280	260	Samana
20	Marifranchi Rodríguez	29/8/1990	184	68	310	300	Mirador
21	Camil Inmaculada Domínguez Martínez	7/12/1991	176	75	232	275	Mirador
22	Gina Altagracia Mambru Casilla	21/1/1986	182	65	330	315	Los Cachorros
23	Niverka Dharlenis Marte Frica	19/10/1990	178	71	295	283	Mirador
24	Brayelin Elizabeth Martínez	11/9/1996	201	83	330	320	Deportivo Nacional
25	Natalia Martínez	25/11/2000	186	71	300	275	Mirador

== Germany ==
- Head coach: (Italy) Luciano Pedullà

#	Name	Date of birth	Height	Weight	Spike	Block	2015 Club
1	Lenka Dürr	10/12/1990	171	59	280	270	Azeryol Baku
2	Kathleen Weiß	2/2/1984	171	66	290	273	Agel Prostejov
3	Denise Hanke	31/8/1989	179	58	282	272	Impel Wrocław
4	Maren Brinker	10/7/1986	184	68	303	295	Montichiari Volley
5	Jana Franziska Poll	7/5/1988	185	69	310	290	Schweriner SC
6	Jennifer Geerties	5/4/1994	184	58	298	288	Schweriner SC
7	Jennifer Pettke	29/5/1989	187	71	302	290	VC Wiesbaden
8	Linda Dörendahl	20/7/1984	176	60	292	276	USC Münster
9	Leonie Schwertmann	12/1/1994	190	80	300	290	USC Münster
10	Lena Stigrot	20/12/1994	184	68	303	295	Rote Raben Vilsbiburg
11	Louisa Lippmann	23/9/1994	191	78	319	312	Dresdner SC
12	Heike Beier	9/12/1983	184	73	305	293	BKF Aluprof Bielsko Biala
13	Saskia Hippe	16/1/1991	185	67	315	292	Schweriner SC
14	Margareta Kozuch (c)	30/10/1986	187	70	309	297	RebecchiNordameccanica Piacenz
15	Lisa Thomsen	20/8/1985	172	68	290	285	Lokomotiv Baku
16	Anja Brandt	15/2/1990	195	77	310	295	Schweriner SC
17	Lisa Izquierdo	29/8/1994	178	78	309	294	Dresdner SC
18	Wiebke Silge	16/7/1996	190	75	302	291	USC Münster
19	Laura Weihenmaier	4/4/1991	180	70	297	286	Schweriner SC
20	Mareen Apitz	26/3/1987	183	73	295	284	RC Cannes
21	Julia Schaefer	3/7/1996	187	73	309	292	USC Münster
22	Marie Schölzel	1/8/1997	188	66	307	299	VCO Berlin
23	Janine Völker	19/9/1991	178	69	301	290	Schweriner SC
24	Juliane Langgemach	6/11/1994	188	73	295	285	Dresdner SC
25	Mareike Hindriksen	14/11/1987	182	62	295	270	Volley Allianz Stuttgart

== Italy ==
- Head coach: (Italy) Marco Bonitta

#	Name	Date of birth	Height	Weight	Spike	Block	2015 Club
1	Indre Sorokaite(it)	2/7/1988	188	84	300	280	Fenerbahçe
2	Ofelia Malinov	29/2/1996	183	70	301	282	Club Italia
3	Noemi Signorile	15/2/1990	182	74	294	290	AGIL Volley Novara
4	Sara Loda(it)	22/8/1990	178	75	308	287	Volley Bergamo
5	Caterina Bosetti	2/2/1994	179	59	299	281	Galatasaray S.K.
6	Monica De Gennaro	8/1/1987	174	67	292	270	Imoco Volley Conegliano
7	Martina Guiggi	1/5/1984	183	69	315	290	AGIL Volley Novara
8	Alessia Gennari(it)	3/11/1991	184	68	302	284	Volleyball Casalmaggiore
9	Raphaela Folie	7/3/1991	186	82	307	283	Liu Jo Modena
10	Raffaella Calloni	4/5/1983	184	70	302	283	Azzurra Volley San Casciano
11	Cristina Chirichella	10/2/1994	195	73	314	296	AGIL Volley Novara
12	Stefania Sansonna	1/11/1982	175	68	298	276	AGIL Volley Novara
13	Valentina Arrighetti (c)	26/1/1985	185	72	318	310	Lokomotiv Baku
14	Valentina Tirozzi	26/3/1986	181	69	296	277	Volleyball Casalmaggiore
15	Miriam Fatime Sylla	8/1/1995	181	80	314	287	Volley Bergamo
16	Lucia Bosetti	9/7/1989	175	65	316	286	Fenerbahçe
17	Valentina Diouf	10/1/1993	202	94	320	303	Futura Volley Busto Arsizio
18	Paola Egonu	18/12/1998	189	70	330	315	Club Italia
19	Letizia Camera	1/10/1992	175	62	285	270	Futura Volley Busto Arsizio
20	Giulia Pisani	4/6/1992	184	69	313	298	Futura Volley Busto Arsizio
21	Ilaria Spirito	20/2/1994	174	56	250	243	Club Italia
22	Anastasia Guerra	15/10/1996	187	80	300	286	Club Italia
23	Beatrice Parrocchiale	26/12/1995	168	59	286	258	Azzurra Volley San Casciano
24	Sofia D'odorico	6/1/1997	187	78	306	289	Club Italia
25	Alessia Orro	18/7/1998	183	74	276	270	Club Italia

== Japan ==
- Head coach: (Japan) Masayoshi Manabe

#	Name	Date of birth	Height	Weight	Spike	Block	2015 Club
1	Miyu Nagaoka	25/7/1991	179	65	310	295	Hisamitsu Springs
2	Kotoki Zayasu	11/1/1990	159	57	272	262	Hisamitsu Springs
3	Saori Kimura (c)	19/8/1986	185	65	304	293	Toray Arrows
4	Arisa Takada	17/2/1987	175	64	290	275	Toray Arrows
5	Chizuru Kotō (ja)	8/10/1982	171	65	295	279	Hisamitsu Springs
6	Nozomi Tsuchida (ja)	19/8/1986	167	59	283	283	Ageo Medics
7	Mai Yamaguchi	3/7/1983	176	62	302	290	Okayama Seagulls
8	Sarina Koga	21/5/1996	180	66	305	290	NEC Red Rockets
9	Haruyo Shimamura	4/3/1992	182	78	299	287	NEC Red Rockets
10	Sayaka Iwasaki (ja)	18/7/1990	158	52	269	252	NEC Red Rockets
11	Erika Araki	3/8/1984	186	78	304	301	Ageo Medics
12	Yuki Ishii	8/5/1991	180	68	303	286	Hisamitsu Springs
13	Mio Satō (ja)	12/2/1993	158	52	250	245	Toyota Auto Body Queenseis
14	Yukiko Ebata	7/11/1989	176	67	305	298	PFU BlueCats
15	Mami Uchiseto (ja)	25/10/1991	170	70	296	281	Hitachi Rivale
16	Saori Sakoda	18/12/1987	175	64	305	279	Toray Arrows
17	Kana Ōno	30/6/1992	180	70	297	283	NEC Red Rockets
18	Airi Miyabe (ja)	29/7/1998	181	63	309	290	Kinrankai Senior Highschool
19	Haruka Miyashita	1/9/1994	177	61	298	272	Okayama Seagulls
20	Natsumi Fujita	5/8/1991	166	50	277	268	Toyota Auto Body Queenseis
21	Riho Ōtake	23/12/1993	183	65	306	290	Denso Airybees
22	Yurie Nabeya (ja)	15/12/1993	176	58	302	288	Denso Airybees
23	Mizuho Ishida	22/1/1988	174	67	301	280	Denso Airybees
24	Risa Shiragaki (ja)	30/7/1991	179	64	304	290	NEC Red Rockets
25	Sayaka Tsutsui	29/9/1992	157	54	260	250	Hisamitsu Springs

== Kazakhstan ==
- Head coach: (Ukraine) Oleksandr Gutor

#	Name	Date of birth	Height	Weight	Spike	Block	2015 Club
1	Tatyana Mudritskaya	17/1/1985	195	77	310	300	Apollon Limassoll
2	Lyudmila Issayeva	26/9/1989	184	70	295	280	Zhetysu Almaty
3	Sana Anarkulova	21/7/1989	188	77	300	280	Zhetysu Almaty
4	Lyudmila Anarbayeva	12/11/1983	192	72	305	299	Zhetysu Almaty
5	Olga Nassedkina	28/12/1982	190	75	305	255	Zhetysu Almaty
6	Zarina Sitkazinova	20/3/1993	182	70	295	280	Astana
7	Anastassiya Rostovchshikova	17/4/1994	180	64	280	260	Kostanay
8	Korinna Ishimtseva (c)	8/2/1984	187	69	300	280	Zhetysu Almaty
9	Irina Lukomskaya	19/3/1991	176	66	280	270	VC Voronezh
10	Irina Shenberger	20/2/1992	180	73	290	280	Astana
11	Diana Kavtorina	30/12/1992	167	56	270	275	Irtysh Kazchrome
12	Yekaterina Razorenkova	3/6/1993	185	69	283	280	Zhetysu Almaty
13	Yana Yagodina	24/1/1993	182	69	300	285	Zhetysu Almaty
14	Antonina Rubtsova	30/12/1984	184	67	302	275	Irtysh Kazchrome
15	Alena Popova	21/3/1997	182	66	291	275	Karaganda
16	Katerina Tatko	15/12/1992	182	70	285	275	Zhetysu Almaty
17	Tatyana Gubaidullina	3/3/1996	187	65	278	260	Kostanay
18	Ardak Maratova	3/6/1994	183	76	275	265	Zhetysu Almaty
19	Yekaterina Zhdanova	28/5/1992	183	65	280	270	Karaganda
20	Valeriya Rylova	22/11/1987	179	72	280	270	Karaganda
21	Ainagul Aizharikhova	4/9/1994	186	65	320	305	Astana
22	Natalya Akilova	31/5/1993	183	62	295	275	Karaganda
23	Aliya Batkuldina	17/11/1995	181	74	273	264	Astana
24	Irina Chumak	26/1/1994	185	67	285	270	Zhetysu Almaty
25	Valeriya Chumak	20/9/1994	186	65	278	265	Kostanay

== Kenya ==
- Head coach: (Kenya) David Lung'aho

#	Name	Date of birth	Height	Weight	Spike	Block	2015 Club
1	Jane Wairimu	24/3/1985	174	60	300	285	Kenya Prisons
2	Everlyne Makuto	25/8/1990	181	64	328	308	Kenya Prisons
3	Joan Kibor	30/9/1989	181	68	303	299	Kenya Prisons
4	Esther Wangeshi	22/11/1990	180	73	302	296	Kenya Pipeline Company
7	Jannet Wanja	24/2/1984	175	59	299	287	Kenya Pipeline Company
8	Triza Atuka	14/4/1992	188	65	298	293	Kenya Pipeline Company
9	Elizabeth Wanyama	27/5/1987	174	68	270	260	Kenya Prisons
10	Noel Murambi	29/1/1989	178	68	290	294	Kenya Pipeline
11	Joy Lusenaka	25/2/1991	180	62	302	290	Kenya Prisons
12	Lydia Maiyo	3/11/1988	185	75	325	315	Kenya Prisons
14	Mercy Moim	1/1/1989	183	72	320	308	Kenya Prisons
15	Brackcides Khadambi	14/5/1984	180	70	310	306	Kenya Prisons
16	Ruth Jepngetich	9/4/1990	186	74	294	299	Kenya Pipeline Company
17	Gaudencia Makokha	15/11/1992	187	68	280	270	Kenya Pipeline Company
18	Monica Biama	23/8/1988	176	59	300	270	Kenya Pipeline Company
19	Edith Mukuvilani	20/7/1994	184	73	305	298	Kenya Prisons

== Mexico ==
- Head coach:Jorge Azair

#	Name	Date of birth	Height	Weight	Spike	Block	2015 Club
1	Gema León	11/3/1991	181	63	292	275	Nuevo León
2	Lizeth López	14/5/1990	164	62	277	252	Nuevo León
3	Grecia Rivera	8/6/1992	178	61	291	283	Chihuahua
4	Fernanda Bañuelos	19/3/1997	186	70	303	285	Baja California
5	Andrea Rangel	19/5/1993	180	57	297	289	Nuevo León
6	Freda María López Olmos	17/6/1988	164	64	235	230	Oaxaca
7	Karina Angelica Flores Gamez	16/8/1998	188	72	299	285	Nuevo León
8	Dulce Carranza	29/6/1990	178	83	275	252	Nuevo León
9	Alejandra Patricia Segura Maldonado	9/11/1993	177	69	291	283	Nuevo León
10	Lizbeth Sainz	14/12/1995	178	55	295	285	Baja California
11	Xitlali Herrera	2/1/1992	183	75	294	275	Chihuahua
12	Montserrat Castro Narvaez	12/12/1996	199	85	270	268	UNAM
13	Mónica Moreno Hernández	27/4/1995	185	83	292	289	Nuevo León
14	Claudia Ríos	22/9/1992	174	54	282	262	Tamaulipas
15	Jocelyn Urias	16/2/1996	190	65	296	285	Baja California
16	Karla Sainz	22/7/1993	184	75	282	272	Baja California
17	Zaira Orellana	3/5/1989	183	63	295	287	Jalisco
18	Jazmin Hernández	18/9/1989	175	70	295	287	Nuevo León
19	María Fernanda Rodríguez Gómez	23/6/1997	185	80	287	280	Nuevo León
20	Ana Valle	31/5/1996	194	89	310	297	Distrito Federal
21	Kaomi Solis	6/8/1994	160	56	250	240	Colima
22	Gabriela Chávez	30/9/1994	174	70	265	254	Nuevo León
23	Paula López	4/1/1991	173	60	284	258	Coahuila
24	Mireya Núñez	31/8/1995	175	63	303	285	Nuevo León
25	Sanay Sashiko	13/5/1995	170	63	305	298	Baja California

== Netherlands ==
- Head coach: (Italy) Giovanni Guidetti

#	Name	Date of birth	Height	Weight	Spike	Block	2015 Club
1	Kirsten Knip	14/9/1992	179	70	281	275	Istres Ouest Provence Volley
2	Femke Stoltenborg	30/7/1991	190	81	303	299	Volley 2002 Forlì
3	Yvon Belien	28/12/1993	188	73	307	303	Schweriner SC
4	Celeste Plak	26/10/1995	190	87	314	302	Volley Bergamo
5	Robin de Kruijf (c)	5/5/1991	193	81	313	300	Vakıfbank
6	Maret Balkestein-Grothues	16/9/1988	180	68	304	285	RC Cannes
7	Quinta Steenbergen	2/4/1985	189	75	309	300	Lokomotiv Baku
8	Judith Pietersen	3/0/1989	188	73	306	296	Trabzonspor
9	Myrthe Schoot	29/8/1988	182	70	298	286	Dresdner SC
10	Lonneke Slöetjes	15/11/1990	192	76	322	315	Schweriner SC
11	Anne Buijs	2/12/1991	191	73	317	299	Lokomotiv Baku
12	Manon Nummerdor-Flier	8/2/1984	192	71	315	301	Zhengrong Fujian
13	Celia Diemkoudre	30/7/1992	182	66	300	290	Sliedrecht Sport
14	Laura Dijkema	18/2/1990	184	70	293	279	Dresdner SC
16	Debby Stam-Pilon	24/7/1984	184	69	303	281
17	Kim Renkema	28/6/1987	179	67	295	282	Allianz MTV Stuttgart
18	Klaske Sikkes	7/4/1993	188	74	299	286	VC Sneek
19	Britt Bongaerts	11/3/1996	185	68	296	284	Eurosped Tvt Almelo
20	Quirine Oosterveld	5/3/1990	181	70	296	288	Rote Raben Vilsbiburg
21	Esther Van Berkel	31/8/1990	176	68	301	287	Saint-Cloud Paris SF
22	Nicole Koolhaas	31/1/1991	198	77	310	300	Vfm Franches Montagnes
23	Inge Molendijk	9/12/1992	186	76	287	284	Istres Ouest Provence Volley
24	Tessa Polder	10/10/1997	189	73	297	286	National Sports Centre Papendal
25	Fleur Savelkoel	22/8/1995	184	77	300	287	New Nexus Apps/Lycurgus

== Peru ==
- Head coach: (Brazil) Mauro Marasciulo

#	Name	Date of birth	Height	Weight	Spike	Block	2015 Club
1	Cristina Cuba	4/6/1996	176	65	280	275	Regatas Lima
2	Mirtha Uribe (c)	12/3/1985	182	67	297	286	Alianza Lima
3	Carla Rueda	19/4/1990	184	70	312	306	Club Cultural Deportivo Géminis
4	Daniela Uribe	11/12/1993	185	63	302	292	Club Deportivo Universidad de San Martín de Porres
5	Shiamara Almeida Chavez	19/2/1996	172	62	286	275	Sporting Cristal
6	Alexandra Muñoz	16/8/1992	177	63	287	281	Club Deportivo Universidad César Vallejo
7	Susan Egoavil	16/1/1988	162	52	265	251	Sporting Cristal
8	Maguilaura Frias	28/5/1997	186	71	291	280	Club Deportivo Universidad de San Martín de Porres
9	Raffaella Camet	14/9/1992	184	67	289	285	Sporting Cristal
10	Katherinne Olemar	10/5/1993	174	65	293	280	Sporting Cristal
11	Clarivett Yllescas	11/8/1993	185	63	305	295	Club Deportivo Universidad César Vallejo
12	Angela Leyva	22/11/1996	181	70	310	289	Club Deportivo Universidad de San Martín de Porres
13	Ginna López	28/5/1994	189	66	310	298	Alianza Lima
14	Andrea Urrutia	31/5/1997	185	65	278	275	Club Deportivo Universidad de San Martín de Porres
15	Karla Ortiz	20/10/1991	182	60	300	290	Sporting Cristal
16	María de Fatima Acosta	25/5/1992	164	56	275	270	Club Cultural Deportivo Géminis
17	Janice Torres	8/11/1989	166	55	258	261	Club Deportivo Universidad de San Martín de Porres
18	Coraima Gomez	9/8/1996	177	70	280	275	Alianza Lima
19	Zoila La Rosa	31/5/1990	176	57	285	280	Club Deportivo Universidad de San Martín de Porres

== Poland ==
- Head coach: (Poland) Jacek Nawrocki

#	Name	Date of birth	Height	Weight	Spike	Block	2015 Club
1	Aleksandra Krzos	23/6/1989	181	71	275	260	KPS Chemik Police
2	Maja Tokarska	22/2/1991	193	72	303	292	Atom Trefl Sopot
3	Zuzanna Efimienko	8/8/1989	197	72	318	303	Atom Trefl Sopot
4	Izabela Bełcik	29/11/1980	185	65	304	292	Atom Trefl Sopot
5	Agnieszka Kakolewska	17/10/1994	197	75	309	295	Impel Wrocław
6	Aleksandra Trojan	6/6/1991	193	68	306	293	BKS SA
7	Gabriela Polanska	27/11/1988	202	81	308	299	Budowlani Łódź
8	Katarzyna Zaroślinska	3/2/1987	187	72	312	290	Atom Trefl Sopot
9	Agata Sawicka	17/1/1985	180	64	295	277	Impel Wrocław
10	Klaudia Kaczorowska	20/12/1988	184	68	303	281	Atom Trefl Sopot
11	Daria Paszek	30/8/1991	185	76	303	280	Legionovia SA
12	Izabela Kowalińska	23/2/1985	186	77	300	283	KPS Chemik Police
13	Agata Durajczyk	19/8/1989	170	63	280	275	Atom Trefl Sopot
14	Joanna Wolosz (c)	7/4/1990	181	65	303	281	Yamamay Busto Arsizio
15	Natalia Kurnikowska	13/1/1992	185	71	304	275	MKS Muszyna
16	Elżbieta Skowrońska	6/7/1983	183	71	305	280	Canakkale
17	Katarzyna Skowrońska-Dolata	30/6/1983	189	75	314	296	Rabita Baku
18	Aleksandra Wójcik	3/1/1994	184	76	297	279	Legionovia SA
19	Ewelina Sieczka	26/1/1988	182	68	308	280	Budowlani Łódź
20	Natalia Piekarczyk	2/5/1988	179	65	296	280	MKS Muszyna
21	Tamara Kaliszuk	20/3/1990	181	73	296	281	MKS Muszyna
22	Malwina Smarzek	3/6/1996	191	80	318	292	Legionovia SA
23	Ewelina Tobiasz	6/2/1994	177	67	293	276	KSZO Ostrowiec
24	Aleksandra Sikorska	28/4/1993	185	67	306	286	Budowlani Łódź
25	Anna Grejman	8/6/1993	183	67	302	283	Impel Wrocław

== Puerto Rico ==
- Head coach:José Mieles

#	Name	Date of birth	Height	Weight	Spike	Block	2015 Club
1	Debora Seilhamer	4/10/1985	166	61	3	2	Cataño
2	Shara Venegas	18/9/1992	173	68	280	272	Caguas
3	Vilmarie Mojica	13/8/1985	180	63	295	288	Caguas
4	Raymariely Santos	13/4/1992	183	72	290	288	Ponce
5	Sarai Alvarez	3/4/1986	183	61	295	286	Mayagüez
6	Yarimar Rosa (c)	20/6/1988	178	62	295	285	Mayagüez
7	Stephanie Enright	15/12/1990	179	56	300	292	Caguas
8	Jennifer Nogueras	1/8/1991	185	88	299	292	National Team
9	Aurea Cruz	10/1/1982	180	63	310	290	Carolina
10	Genesis Collazo	4/10/1992	185	74	301	296	Caguas
11	Karina Ocasio	1/08/1985	192	76	298	288	Caguas
12	Jetzabel Del Valle	19/12/1979	185	73	305	292	Humacao
13	Shirley Ferrer	23/6/1991	180	63	290	293	Humacao
14	Natalia Valentin	12/9/1989	170	61	244	240	Ponce
15	Daly Santana	19/2/1995	185	65	300	274	National Team
16	Alexandra Oquendo	3/2/1984	189	75	297	284	Caguas
17	Sheila Ocasio	17/11/1982	195	74	310	292	Juncos
18	Lynda Morales	20/5/1988	188	94	302	296	Guaynabo
19	Janeliss Torres	9/7/1991	166	62	305	296	Ponce
20	Vanesa Velez	29/8/1989	180	68	292	280	Carolina
21	Diana Reyes	29/4/1993	191	80	303	299	Caguas
22	Genesis Miranda	5/6/1996	180	56	288	283	National Team
23	Pilar Marie Victoria	11/10/1995	182	53	301	268	National Team
24	Nayka Benitez	2/8/1989	180	66	246	240	Guaynabo
25	Jessica Candelario	2/11/1987	180	76	302	295	Corozal

== Russia ==
- Head coach: (Russia) Yuri Marichev

#	Name	Date of birth	Height	Weight	Spike	Block	2015 Club
1	Yana Shcherban	6/9/1989	185	71	298	294	Dinamo Krasnodar
2	Anna Matienko	12/7/1981	182	68	298	292	Uralochka
3	Anastasia Bavykina	6/7/1992	188	73	313	300	VC Zarechie Odintsovo
4	Irina Zaryazhko	4/10/1991	196	78	305	290	Uralochka
5	Aleksandra Pasynkova	14/4/1987	190	75	313	305	Dinamo Krasnodar
6	Olga Efimova	6/1/1990	181	68	292	273	VC Zarechie Odintsovo
7	Ekaterina Lyubushkina	2/1/1990	188	81	305	301	Busto Arsizio
8	Nataliya Goncharova	1/6/1989	194	75	315	306	Dynamo Moscow
9	Daria Pisarenko	22/04/1991	190	71	305	290	Uralochka
10	Ekaterina Kosianenko (c)	2/2/1990	178	64	290	285	VC Zarechie Odintsovo
11	Yekaterina Gamova	17/10/1980	205	80	321	310	Dynamo Kazan
12	Ekaterina Orlova	21/10/1987	193	77	307	301	Omichka Omsk
13	Yevgeniya Startseva	12/2/1989	185	68	294	290	Dynamo Kazan
14	Irina Fetisova	7/9/1994	190	76	307	286	VC Zarechie Odintsovo
15	Tatiana Kosheleva	23/12/1988	191	67	315	305	Dinamo Krasnodar
16	Irina Malkova	23/3/1989	192	80	306	294	Dynamo Kazan
17	Natalia Malykh	8/12/1993	187	65	308	297	VC Zarechie Odintsovo
18	Kseniia Ilchenko	31/10/1994	183	64	300	286	Uralochka
19	Anna Malova	16/4/1990	175	59	286	290	Dynamo Moscow
20	Anastasia Shlyakhovaya	5/10/1990	192	69	313	307	Omichka Omsk
21	Ekaterina Ulanova	5/8/1986	172	61	298	290	Dynamo Kazan
22	Ksenia Kravchenko	5/2/1991	184	79	298	278	VC Voronezh
23	Ekaterina Efimova	3/7/1993	192	70	305	295	LUCH
24	Liubov Shashkova	4/12/1977	192	72	315	307	Dinamo Krasnodar
25	Olga Biryukova	19/9/1994	193	74	300	283	Dynamo Kazan

== Serbia ==
- Head coach: (Serbia) Zoran Terzić

#	Name	Date of birth	Height	Weight	Spike	Block	2015 Club
1	Maja Savić	14/8/1993	189	70	305	295	Vizura Beograd
2	Marta Drpa	20/4/1989	192	73	304	292	NIS Spartak Subotica
3	Sanja Malagurski	8/6/1990	193	74	305	295	KPS Chemik Police
4	Bojana Živković	29/3/1988	186	72	300	292	ILBANK Ankara
5	Mina Popović	16/9/1994	187	73	315	305	OK Crvena Zvezda
6	Tijana Malešević	18/3/1991	185	78	300	286	Sarıyer Belediyespor
7	Brižitka Molnar	28/7/1985	182	69	304	290	Bokai Bank Tianjin
8	Danica Radenković	9/10/1992	185	70	300	294	Polski Cukier Muszynianka
9	Brankica Mihajlović	13/4/1991	190	83	302	290	Hisamitsu Springs
10	Maja Ognjenović (c)	6/8/1984	183	66	300	293	KPS Chemik Police
11	Stefana Veljković	9/1/1990	190	76	320	305	KPS Chemik Police
12	Jelena Nikolić	13/4/1982	194	79	315	300	Azerrail Baku
13	Ana Bjelica	3/4/1992	190	78	310	305	KPS Chemik Police
14	Ljiljana Rankovic	8/4/1993	181	72	295	280	Vizura Beograd
15	Jovana Stevanović	30/6/1992	192	72	308	295	Pomi Casalmaggiore
16	Milena Rašić	25/10/1990	191	72	315	310	Vakıfbank Istanbul
17	Silvija Popović	15/3/1986	178	65	286	276	Voléro Zürich
18	Suzana Ćebić	9/11/1984	167	60	279	255	Univerzitatea Tirgoviste
19	Tijana Bošković	8/3/1997	193	82	315	307	Vizura Beograd
20	Sladjana Mirković	7/10/1995	185	78	293	282	Vizura Beograd
21	Bianka Buša	25/7/1994	187	74	293	282	Vizura Beograd
22	Aleksandra Stepanović	1/2/1994	170	67	255	240	Vizura Beograd
23	Aleksandra Crnčević	30/5/1987	184	76	304	294	Lokomotiv Baku
24	Aleksandra Cvetićanin	5/4/1993	186	69	290	278	NIS Spartak Subotica
25	Adela Helić	24/2/1990	185	78	310	300	OK Crvena Zvezda

== Thailand ==
- Head coach: (Thailand) Kiattipong Radchatagriengkai

#	Name	Date of birth	Height	Weight	Spike	Block	2015 Club
1	Wanna Buakaew	2/1/1981	172	54	292	277	Idea khonkaen VC
2	Piyanut Pannoy	10/11/1989	171	68	280	275	Supreme VC
3	Wipawee Srithong	28/1/1999	171	63	288	266	Supreme VC
4	Thatdao Nuekjang	3/2/1994	183	66	305	287	Idea khonkaen VC
5	Pleumjit Thinkaow	9/11/1983	180	63	298	281	Bangkok Glass VC
6	Onuma Sittirak	13/6/1986	175	72	304	285	JT Marvelous
7	Hattaya Bamrungsuk	12/8/1993	178	70	290	280	Nakhon Ratchasima
8	Pimpichaya Kokram	16/6/1998	175	57	291	281	Nakhonnon-3BB VC
9	Chatchu-on Moksri	6/11/1999	175	63	285	275	Ayutthaya A.T.C.C
10	Wilavan Apinyapong (c)	6/6/1984	174	68	294	282	Nakhon Ratchasima
11	Pornpun Guedpard	5/5/1993	170	63	270	267	Bangkok Glass VC
12	Tapaphaipun Chaisri	29/11/1989	168	60	295	276	Sisaket VC
13	Nootsara Tomkom	7/7/1985	169	57	289	278	Rabita Baku
14	Wanitchaya Luangtonglang	8/10/1992	177	60	300	275	Nakhon Ratchasima
15	Malika Kanthong	8/1/1987	177	63	292	278	Nakhonnon-3BB VC
16	Jarasporn Bundasak	1/3/1993	180	66	290	280	Bangkok Glass VC
17	Tichaya Boonlert	14/2/1997	178	64	275	271	Nakhonnon-3BB VC
18	Ajcharaporn Kongyot	18/6/1995	180	66	290	284	Supreme VC
19	Parinya Pankaew	27/12/1995	170	59	281	269	Supreme VC
20	Sineenat Phocharoen	19/5/1995	173	53	287	270	Sisaket VC
21	Khatthalee Pinsuwan	30/10/1994	170	70	294	271	Idea khonkaen VC
22	Kaewkalaya Kamulthala	7/8/1994	178	66	298	281	Idea khonkaen VC
23	Kannika Thipachot	3/5/1993	167	67	285	273	Ayutthaya A.T.C.C
24	Yupa Sanitklang	14/8/1991	166	60	275	260	Ayutthaya A.T.C.C
25	Soraya Phomla	6/8/1992	169	60	280	270	Ayutthaya A.T.C.C

== Turkey ==
- Head coach: (Turkey) Ferhat Akbaş

#	Name	Date of birth	Height	Weight	Spike	Block	2015 Club
1	Hatice Gizem Örge	26/4/1993	170	59	270	260	Vakifbank
2	Seniye Merve Dalbeler	27/6/1987	182	73	284	277	Fenerbahçe
3	Gizem Karadayi	14/1/1987	178	60	290	285	Vakifbank
4	Dicle Nur Babat	15/9/1992	190	78	296	289	Fenerbahçe
5	Kübra Akman	13/10/1994	197	89	314	305	Vakifbank
6	Polen Uslupehlivan	27/8/1990	193	65	305	298	Fenerbahçe
7	Seda Aslanyurek	25/5/1986	192	70	310	303	Beijing BAW
8	Asuman Karakoyun	16/7/1990	180	72	293	289	Eczacıbaşı VitrA
9	Büşra Cansu	16/7/1990	188	84	297	291	Eczacıbaşı VitrA
10	Güldeniz Önal (c)	25/3/1986	183	75	302	293	Vakifbank
11	Naz Aydemir Akyol	14/8/1990	186	68	300	290	Vakifbank
12	Meryem Boz	3/2/1988	194	63	301	293	Bursa Buyuksehir
13	Neriman Özsoy	13/7/1988	188	76	309	302	Imoco Volley Conegliano
14	Gözde Yılmaz	9/9/1991	195	82	306	299	Eczacıbaşı VitrA
15	Yeliz Başa	13/8/1987	187	75	306	297	NEC Red Rockets
16	Meliha İsmailoğlu	17/9/1993	188	70	304	301	Fenerbahçe
17	Şeyma Ercan	5/7/1994	187	75	302	295	Eczacıbaşı VitrA
18	Asli Kalac	13/12/1995	183	73	300	290	Galatasaray S.K.
19	Ezgi Dilik	12/6/1995	170	60	300	310	Fenerbahçe
20	Çağla Akın	19/1/1995	177	70	287	280	Vakifbank
21	Özgenur Yurtdagülen	6/8/1993	190	67	307	298	Galatasaray S.K.
22	Ceylan Arisan	1/1/1994	193	79	306	297	Eczacıbaşı VitrA
23	Nilay Ozdemir	24/10/1985	179	67	286	280	Eczacıbaşı VitrA
24	Ezgi Dagdelenler	3/11/1993	184	69	290	269	ILBANK
25	Dilara Bagci	2/2/1994	165	62	270	260	Eczacıbaşı VitrA

== United States ==
- Head coach: (United States) Karch Kiraly

#	Name	Date of birth	Height	Weight	Spike	Block	2015 Club
1	Alisha Glass	5/4/1988	184	72	305	300	Imoco Volley Conegliano
2	Kayla Banwarth	21/1/1989	178	75	295	283	USA Volleyball Team
3	Courtney Thompson	4/11/1984	170	66	276	263	Voléro Zürich
4	Lauren Paolini	22/8/1987	193	73	317	299	Hitachi Rivale
5	Tamari Miyashiro	8/7/1987	170	70	284	266	Allianz Volley Stuttgart
6	Nicole Davis	24/4/1982	167	73	284	266	E.S. Cannet Rocheville VB
7	Cassidy Lichtman	25/5/1989	185	68	299	279	E.S. Cannet Rocheville VB
8	Lauren Gibbemeyer	8/9/1988	187	71	307	293	VBC Pallavolo Rosa SSDRL
9	Kristin Hildebrand	30/6/1985	185	68	300	284	Fenerbahçe
10	Jordan Quinn Larson-Burbach	16/10/1986	188	75	302	295	Eczacıbaşı VitrA
11	Megan Easy	15/10/1988	191	80	320	297	USA Volleyball Team
12	Kelly Murphy	20/10/1989	188	79	315	307	Ageo Medics
13	Christa Harmotto Dietzen (c)	12/10/1986	188	79	322	300	USA Volleyball Team
14	Nicole Fawcett	16/12/1986	191	82	310	291	Gimcheon Korea Expressway Corporation Hi-pass
15	Kimberly Hill	30/11/1989	193	72	320	310	Vakıfbank
16	Foluke Akinradewo	5/10/1987	191	79	331	300	Rabita Baku
17	Alexandra Klineman	30/12/1989	194	73	322	299	Agil Volley SSD
18	Molly Kreklow	17/2/1992	181	64	291	281	Dresdner SC
19	Michelle Bartsch	12/2/1990	190	78	305	296	Dresdner SC
20	Cursty Jackson	11/9/1990	188	71	320	310	Dresdner SC
21	TeTori Dixon	4/8/1992	191	83	306	295	Rabita Baku
22	Rachael Adams	3/6/1990	188	81	318	307	Imoco Volley Conegliano
23	Kelsey Robinson	25/6/1992	188	75	306	300	Beijing BAW
24	Krista Vansant	31/3/1993	188	75	310	300	USA Volleyball Team
25	Karsta Lowe	2/2/1993	196	75	315	300	Naranjito Las Changas
