= 2015 Montreux Volley Masters squads =

This article shows the rosters of all participating teams at the 2015 Montreux Volley Masters in Switzerland.

== Pool A ==
=== Netherlands ===
The following is the Dutch roster in the 2015 Montreux Volley Masters.

Head coach: Giovanni Guidetti

No.	Name	Date of birth	Height	Weight	Spike	Block	2015 club
2	Femke Stoltenborg	30 July 1991	1.90 m (6 ft 3 in)	79 kg (174 lb)	303 cm (119 in)	299 cm (118 in)	(Italy) Forlì
3	Yvon Belien	28 December 1993	1.88 m (6 ft 2 in)	73 kg (161 lb)	307 cm (121 in)	303 cm (119 in)	(Germany) Schweriner SC
4	Celeste Plak	26 October 1995	1.90 m (6 ft 3 in)	84 kg (185 lb)	314 cm (124 in)	302 cm (119 in)	(Italy) Volley Bergamo
5	Robin de Kruijf	5 May 1991	1.93 m (6 ft 4 in)	79 kg (174 lb)	313 cm (123 in)	300 cm (120 in)	(Turkey) VakifBank Istanbul
6	Maret Grothues (C)	16 September 1988	1.80 m (5 ft 11 in)	68 kg (150 lb)	304 cm (120 in)	285 cm (112 in)	(France) RC Cannes
7	Quinta Steenbergen	2 April 1985	1.89 m (6 ft 2 in)	74 kg (163 lb)	309 cm (122 in)	300 cm (120 in)	(Azerbaijan) Lokomotiv Baku
8	Judith Pietersen	3 July 1989	1.88 m (6 ft 2 in)	73 kg (161 lb)	306 cm (120 in)	296 cm (117 in)	(Turkey) Trabzon İdmanocağı
9	Myrthe Schoot	29 August 1988	1.84 m (6 ft 0 in)	69 kg (152 lb)	298 cm (117 in)	286 cm (113 in)	(Germany) Dresdner SC
10	Lonneke Slöetjes	15 November 1990	1.92 m (6 ft 4 in)	76 kg (168 lb)	322 cm (127 in)	315 cm (124 in)	(Germany) Schweriner SC
11	Anne Buijs	2 December 1991	1.91 m (6 ft 3 in)	75 kg (165 lb)	317 cm (125 in)	299 cm (118 in)	(Azerbaijan) Lokomotiv Baku
12	Manon Flier	8 February 1984	1.92 m (6 ft 4 in)	70 kg (150 lb)	315 cm (124 in)	301 cm (119 in)	(China) Zhengrong Fujian
14	Laura Dijkema	18 February 1990	1.84 m (6 ft 0 in)	70 kg (150 lb)	293 cm (115 in)	279 cm (110 in)	(Germany) Dresdner SC
16	Debby Stam	24 July 1984	1.84 m (6 ft 0 in)	69 kg (152 lb)	303 cm (119 in)	281 cm (111 in)	
17	Nicole Luttikhuis	26 December 1997	1.91 m (6 ft 3 in)	74 kg (163 lb)	298 cm (117 in)	287 cm (113 in)	(Netherlands) Talent Team Papendal
22	Nicole Koolhaas	31 January 1991	1.98 m (6 ft 6 in)	77 kg (170 lb)	310 cm (120 in)	300 cm (120 in)	(Switzerland) VFM Volley Franches-Montagnes

=== Russia ===
The following is the Russian roster in the 2015 Montreux Volley Masters.

Head coach: Vadim Pankov

No.	Name	Date of birth	Height	Weight	Spike	Block	2015 club
3	Anastasia Bavykina	6 July 1992	1.88 m (6 ft 2 in)	73 kg (161 lb)	313 cm (123 in)	300 cm (120 in)	(Russia) Zarechie Odintsovo
7	Ekaterina Romanenko	23 December 1993	1.70 m (5 ft 7 in)	62 kg (137 lb)	289 cm (114 in)	285 cm (112 in)	(Russia) Zarechie Odintsovo
8	Daria Pisarenko	22 April 1991	1.90 m (6 ft 3 in)	71 kg (157 lb)	305 cm (120 in)	190 cm (75 in)	(Russia) Uralochka
9	Daria Isaeva	29 March 1990	1.86 m (6 ft 1 in)	75 kg (165 lb)	310 cm (120 in)	304 cm (120 in)	(Russia) Omichka Omsk
11	Anna Matienko (C)	12 July 1981	1.82 m (6 ft 0 in)	68 kg (150 lb)	298 cm (117 in)	292 cm (115 in)	(Russia) Uralochka
12	Irina Zaryazhko	4 October 1991	1.96 m (6 ft 5 in)	78 kg (172 lb)	305 cm (120 in)	290 cm (110 in)	(Russia) Uralochka
14	Irina Filishtinskaia	14 June 1990	1.70 m (5 ft 7 in)	65 kg (143 lb)	285 cm (112 in)	275 cm (108 in)	(Russia) Dinamo Krasnodar
16	Yuliya Podskalnaya	18 April 1989	1.90 m (6 ft 3 in)	75 kg (165 lb)	306 cm (120 in)	295 cm (116 in)	(Russia) Dinamo Krasnodar
18	Irina Malkova	23 March 1989	1.92 m (6 ft 4 in)	80 kg (180 lb)	306 cm (120 in)	294 cm (116 in)	(Russia) Dinamo Kazan
19	Irina Voronkova	20 October 1995	1.90 m (6 ft 3 in)	84 kg (185 lb)	305 cm (120 in)	290 cm (110 in)	(Russia) Zarechie Odintsovo
20	Olesya Nikolaeva	18 March 1994	1.87 m (6 ft 2 in)	66 kg (146 lb)	301 cm (119 in)	284 cm (112 in)	(Russia) Dinamo Kazan
22	Ksenia Kravchenko	5 February 1991	1.84 m (6 ft 0 in)	79 kg (174 lb)	298 cm (117 in)	278 cm (109 in)	(Russia) Voronezh

=== China ===
The following is the Chinese roster in the 2015 Montreux Volley Masters.

Head coach: Xu Jiande

No.	Name	Date of birth	Height	Weight	Spike	Block	2015 club
1	Zhang Yu	25 September 1995	1.96 m (6 ft 5 in)	71 kg (157 lb)	320 cm (130 in)	320 cm (130 in)	(China) Beijing
2	Chen Xintong	8 April 1994	1.78 m (5 ft 10 in)	69 kg (152 lb)	297 cm (117 in)	290 cm (110 in)	(China) Beijing
3	Wang Jiamin	11 February 1995	1.86 m (6 ft 1 in)	75 kg (165 lb)	309 cm (122 in)	302 cm (119 in)	(China) Tianjin
4	Xu Jiujing	13 July 1995	1.89 m (6 ft 2 in)	73 kg (161 lb)	316 cm (124 in)	305 cm (120 in)	(China) Shanghai
5	Qin Siyu	2 May 1994	1.84 m (6 ft 0 in)	65 kg (143 lb)	305 cm (120 in)	300 cm (120 in)	(China) Shanghai
6	Wang Weiyi	20 June 1995	1.75 m (5 ft 9 in)	75 kg (165 lb)	286 cm (113 in)	270 cm (110 in)	(China) Shanghai
7	Cheng Long	10 January 1995	1.85 m (6 ft 1 in)	75 kg (165 lb)	305 cm (120 in)	295 cm (116 in)	(China) Shandong
8	Song Meili	23 February 1995	1.86 m (6 ft 1 in)	75 kg (165 lb)	310 cm (120 in)	300 cm (120 in)	(China) Shandong
9	Duan Fang	26 December 1994	1.86 m (6 ft 1 in)	73 kg (161 lb)	301 cm (119 in)	296 cm (117 in)	(China) Liaoning
10	Zheng Yixin	6 May 1995	1.87 m (6 ft 2 in)	66 kg (146 lb)	309 cm (122 in)	290 cm (110 in)	(China) Fujian
11	Liu Yanhan (C)	19 January 1993	1.88 m (6 ft 2 in)	75 kg (165 lb)	315 cm (124 in)	305 cm (120 in)	(China) Army
14	Huang Liuyan	13 June 1994	1.78 m (5 ft 10 in)	66 kg (146 lb)	297 cm (117 in)	290 cm (110 in)	(China) Army
15	Gong Xiangyu	21 April 1997	1.85 m (6 ft 1 in)	64 kg (141 lb)	313 cm (123 in)	306 cm (120 in)	(China) Jiangsu
18	Wang Mengjie	14 November 1995	1.72 m (5 ft 8 in)	65 kg (143 lb)	289 cm (114 in)	280 cm (110 in)	(China) Shandong

=== Dominican Republic ===
The following is the Dominican roster in the 2015 Montreux Volley Masters.

Head coach: (Brazil) Marcos Kwiek

No.	Name	Date of birth	Height	Weight	Spike	Block	2015 club
1	Jineiry Martínez	3 December 1997	1.90 m (6 ft 3 in)	68 kg (150 lb)	305 cm (120 in)	280 cm (110 in)	(Dominican Republic) Mirador
2	Winifer Fernández	6 January 1995	1.69 m (5 ft 7 in)	62 kg (137 lb)	270 cm (110 in)	265 cm (104 in)	(Dominican Republic) Cienfuegos
3	Lisvel Eve	10 September 1991	1.94 m (6 ft 4 in)	70 kg (150 lb)	325 cm (128 in)	315 cm (124 in)	(Dominican Republic) Mirador
4	Marianne Fersola	16 January 1992	1.91 m (6 ft 3 in)	60 kg (130 lb)	315 cm (124 in)	310 cm (120 in)	(Dominican Republic) Mirador
5	Brenda Castillo	5 June 1992	1.67 m (5 ft 6 in)	55 kg (121 lb)	245 cm (96 in)	230 cm (91 in)	(Dominican Republic) San Cristóbal
6	Camil Domínguez	7 December 1991	1.76 m (5 ft 9 in)	75 kg (165 lb)	232 cm (91 in)	275 cm (108 in)	(Dominican Republic) Mirador
7	Niverka Marte	19 October 1990	1.78 m (5 ft 10 in)	71 kg (157 lb)	295 cm (116 in)	283 cm (111 in)	(Dominican Republic) Mirador
8	Cándida Arias	11 March 1992	1.94 m (6 ft 4 in)	68 kg (150 lb)	320 cm (130 in)	315 cm (124 in)	(Dominican Republic) San Cristóbal
13	Erasma Moreno	25 November 1991	1.83 m (6 ft 0 in)	75 kg (165 lb)	289 cm (114 in)	304 cm (120 in)	(Dominican Republic) Monte Plata
14	Prisilla Rivera (C)	29 December 1984	1.83 m (6 ft 0 in)	67 kg (148 lb)	309 cm (122 in)	305 cm (120 in)	(Dominican Republic) San Pedro
16	Yonkaira Peña	10 May 1993	1.90 m (6 ft 3 in)	70 kg (150 lb)	320 cm (130 in)	310 cm (120 in)	(Dominican Republic) Mirador
17	Gina Mambrú	21 January 1986	1.82 m (6 ft 0 in)	65 kg (143 lb)	330 cm (130 in)	315 cm (124 in)	(Dominican Republic) Los Cachorros
19	Ana Yorkira Binet	9 February 1992	1.74 m (5 ft 9 in)	58 kg (128 lb)	280 cm (110 in)	260 cm (100 in)	(Dominican Republic) Samaná
20	Brayelin Martínez	11 September 1996	2.00 m (6 ft 7 in)	72 kg (159 lb)	330 cm (130 in)	320 cm (130 in)	(Dominican Republic) Mirador

== Pool B ==
=== Japan ===
The following is the Japanese roster in the 2015 Montreux Volley Masters.

Head coach: Masayoshi Manabe

No.	Name	Date of birth	Height	Weight	Spike	Block	2015 club
2	Kotoki Zayasu	11 January 1990	1.59 m (5 ft 3 in)	57 kg (126 lb)	270 cm (110 in)	255 cm (100 in)	(Japan) Hisamitsu Springs
3	Saori Kimura	16 August 1986	1.85 m (6 ft 1 in)	65 kg (143 lb)	304 cm (120 in)	293 cm (115 in)	(Japan) Toray Arrows
4	Arisa Takada	17 February 1987	1.75 m (5 ft 9 in)	64 kg (141 lb)	290 cm (110 in)	275 cm (108 in)	(Japan) Toray Arrows
5	Chizuru Kotō	8 October 1982	1.71 m (5 ft 7 in)	65 kg (143 lb)	295 cm (116 in)	282 cm (111 in)	(Japan) Hisamitsu Springs
7	Mai Yamaguchi	3 July 1983	1.76 m (5 ft 9 in)	62 kg (137 lb)	302 cm (119 in)	290 cm (110 in)	(Japan) Okayama Seagulls
8	Sarina Koga	21 May 1996	1.80 m (5 ft 11 in)	66 kg (146 lb)	305 cm (120 in)	290 cm (110 in)	(Japan) NEC Red Rockets
10	Sayaka Iwasaki	18 July 1990	1.58 m (5 ft 2 in)	52 kg (115 lb)	268 cm (106 in)	250 cm (98 in)	(Japan) NEC Red Rockets
12	Yuki Ishii	8 May 1991	1.80 m (5 ft 11 in)	68 kg (150 lb)	303 cm (119 in)	286 cm (113 in)	(Japan) Hisamitsu Springs
14	Yukiko Ebata	7 November 1989	1.76 m (5 ft 9 in)	67 kg (148 lb)	305 cm (120 in)	298 cm (117 in)	(France) RC Cannes
17	Kana Ōno	30 June 1992	1.80 m (5 ft 11 in)	70 kg (150 lb)	297 cm (117 in)	283 cm (111 in)	(Japan) NEC Red Rockets
19	Haruka Miyashita	1 September 1994	1.77 m (5 ft 10 in)	61 kg (134 lb)	298 cm (117 in)	272 cm (107 in)	(Japan) Okayama Seagulls
20	Natsumi Fujita	5 August 1991	1.67 m (5 ft 6 in)	50 kg (110 lb)	282 cm (111 in)	270 cm (110 in)	(Japan) Toyota Auto Body Queenseis
21	Riho Otake	23 December 1993	1.82 m (6 ft 0 in)	68 kg (150 lb)	306 cm (120 in)	296 cm (117 in)	(Japan) Denso Airybees
22	Yurie Nabeya	15 December 1993	1.76 m (5 ft 9 in)	58 kg (128 lb)	302 cm (119 in)	285 cm (112 in)	(Japan) Denso Airybees

=== Turkey ===
The following is the Turkish roster in the 2015 Montreux Volley Masters.

Head coach: Ferhat Akbas

No.	Name	Date of birth	Height	Weight	Spike	Block	2015 club
2	Merve Dalbeler	27 June 1987	1.82 m (6 ft 0 in)	73 kg (161 lb)	310 cm (120 in)	300 cm (120 in)	(Turkey) Fenerbahçe
3	Gizem Karadayı	14 January 1987	1.78 m (5 ft 10 in)	60 kg (130 lb)	290 cm (110 in)	285 cm (112 in)	(Turkey) Vakıfbank
4	Dicle Nur Babat	15 September 1992	1.90 m (6 ft 3 in)	78 kg (172 lb)	296 cm (117 in)	289 cm (114 in)	(Turkey) Fenerbahçe
5	Kübra Akman	13 October 1994	1.97 m (6 ft 6 in)	89 kg (196 lb)	314 cm (124 in)	305 cm (120 in)	(Turkey) Vakıfbank
6	Polen Uslupehlivan	27 August 1990	1.93 m (6 ft 4 in)	65 kg (143 lb)	305 cm (120 in)	298 cm (117 in)	(Turkey) Fenerbahçe
7	Seda Aslanyurek	25 June 1986	1.92 m (6 ft 4 in)	70 kg (150 lb)	310 cm (120 in)	303 cm (119 in)	(China) Beijing BAW
9	Büşra Cansu	16 July 1990	1.88 m (6 ft 2 in)	84 kg (185 lb)	297 cm (117 in)	291 cm (115 in)	(Turkey) Eczacıbaşı
10	Güldeniz Önal (C)	25 March 1986	1.83 m (6 ft 0 in)	75 kg (165 lb)	302 cm (119 in)	293 cm (115 in)	(Turkey) Vakıfbank
11	Naz Aydemir	14 August 1990	1.86 m (6 ft 1 in)	75 kg (165 lb)	290 cm (110 in)	249 cm (98 in)	(Turkey) Vakıfbank
13	Neriman Özsoy	13 July 1988	1.88 m (6 ft 2 in)	76 kg (168 lb)	310 cm (120 in)	291 cm (115 in)	(Italy) Imoco Volley Conegliano
14	Gözde Yılmaz	9 September 1991	1.95 m (6 ft 5 in)	82 kg (181 lb)	306 cm (120 in)	299 cm (118 in)	(Turkey) Eczacıbaşı
16	Meliha İsmailoğlu	17 September 1993	1.88 m (6 ft 2 in)	70 kg (150 lb)	304 cm (120 in)	301 cm (119 in)	(Turkey) Fenerbahçe
18	Asli Kalac	13 December 1995	1.83 m (6 ft 0 in)	73 kg (161 lb)	300 cm (120 in)	290 cm (110 in)	(Turkey) Galatasaray
20	Çağla Akın	19 January 1995	1.77 m (5 ft 10 in)	70 kg (150 lb)	287 cm (113 in)	280 cm (110 in)	(Turkey) Vakıfbank
21	Ezgi Dagdelenler	3 November 1993	1.83 m (6 ft 0 in)	73 kg (161 lb)	305 cm (120 in)	295 cm (116 in)	(Turkey) Elbank

=== Germany ===
The following is the German roster in the 2015 Montreux Volley Masters.

Head coach: (Italy) Luciano Pedullà

No.	Name	Date of birth	Height	Weight	Spike	Block	2015 club
1	Lenka Dürr	10 December 1990	1.71 m (5 ft 7 in)	59 kg (130 lb)	280 cm (110 in)	270 cm (110 in)	(Azerbaijan) Azeryol Baku
3	Denise Hanke	31 August 1989	1.79 m (5 ft 10 in)	58 kg (128 lb)	284 cm (112 in)	272 cm (107 in)	(Poland) Impel Wroclaw
5	Jana Franziska Poll	7 May 1988	1.85 m (6 ft 1 in)	69 kg (152 lb)	310 cm (120 in)	290 cm (110 in)	(Germany) Schweriner SC
6	Jennifer Geerties	5 April 1994	1.84 m (6 ft 0 in)	58 kg (128 lb)	298 cm (117 in)	288 cm (113 in)	(Germany) Schweriner SC
8	Linda Dörendahl	20 July 1984	1.76 m (5 ft 9 in)	60 kg (130 lb)	292 cm (115 in)	276 cm (109 in)	(Germany) USC Münster
11	Louisa Lippmann	23 September 1984	1.91 m (6 ft 3 in)	78 kg (172 lb)	319 cm (126 in)	312 cm (123 in)	(Germany) Dresdner SC
13	Saskia Hippe	16 January 1991	1.85 m (6 ft 1 in)	67 kg (148 lb)	315 cm (124 in)	292 cm (115 in)	(Germany) Schweriner SC
16	Anja Brandt	15 February 1990	1.95 m (6 ft 5 in)	77 kg (170 lb)	310 cm (120 in)	295 cm (116 in)	(Germany) Schweriner SC
18	Wiebke Silge	16 July 1996	1.90 m (6 ft 3 in)	75 kg (165 lb)	302 cm (119 in)	291 cm (115 in)	(Germany) USC Münster
19	Laura Weihenmaier	4 April 1991	1.80 m (5 ft 11 in)	70 kg (150 lb)	297 cm (117 in)	286 cm (113 in)	(Germany) Schweriner SC
20	Mareen Apitz (C)	26 March 1987	1.83 m (6 ft 0 in)	73 kg (161 lb)	295 cm (116 in)	284 cm (112 in)	(France) RC Cannes
22	Marie Schölzel	1 August 1997	1.88 m (6 ft 2 in)	66 kg (146 lb)	307 cm (121 in)	299 cm (118 in)	(Germany) VCO Berlin

=== Italy ===
The following is the Italian roster in the 2015 Montreux Volley Masters.

Head coach: Marco Bonitta

No.	Name	Date of birth	Height	Weight	Spike	Block	2015 club
1	Indre Sorokaite	2 July 1988	1.88 m (6 ft 2 in)	84 kg (185 lb)	300 cm (120 in)	280 cm (110 in)	(Turkey) Fenerbahçe Istanbul
2	Sara Loda	22 August 1990	1.78 m (5 ft 10 in)	75 kg (165 lb)	308 cm (121 in)	287 cm (113 in)	(Italy) Foppapedretti Bergamo
4	Raffaella Calloni (C)	4 May 1983	1.84 m (6 ft 0 in)	70 kg (150 lb)	302 cm (119 in)	283 cm (111 in)	(Italy) Il Bisonte Firenze
5	Ofelia Malinov	29 February 1996	1.83 m (6 ft 0 in)	70 kg (150 lb)	301 cm (119 in)	282 cm (111 in)	(Italy) Brunopremi.com Bassano
7	Raphaela Folie	7 March 1991	1.86 m (6 ft 1 in)	82 kg (181 lb)	307 cm (121 in)	283 cm (111 in)	(Italy) Liu Jo Modena
9	Letizia Camera	1 October 1992	1.75 m (5 ft 9 in)	62 kg (137 lb)	285 cm (112 in)	270 cm (110 in)	(Italy) Imoco Volley Conegliano
10	Beatrice Parrocchiale	26 December 1995	1.68 m (5 ft 6 in)	59 kg (130 lb)	286 cm (113 in)	258 cm (102 in)	(Italy) Atletica Amatori Orago
11	Miriam Fatime Sylla	8 January 1995	1.81 m (5 ft 11 in)	80 kg (180 lb)	314 cm (124 in)	287 cm (113 in)	(Italy) Villa Cortese
12	Anastasia Guerra	15 October 1996	1.87 m (6 ft 2 in)	80 kg (180 lb)	300 cm (120 in)	286 cm (113 in)	(Italy) Bruel Volley Bassano
14	Paola Egonu	18 December 1998	1.89 m (6 ft 2 in)	70 kg (150 lb)	330 cm (130 in)	315 cm (124 in)	(Italy) Club Italia
16	Laura Melandri	31 January 1995	1.84 m (6 ft 0 in)	60 kg (130 lb)	305 cm (120 in)	280 cm (110 in)	(Italy) Volley Bergamo
17	Giulia Pisani	4 June 1992	1.84 m (6 ft 0 in)	69 kg (152 lb)	313 cm (123 in)	298 cm (117 in)	(Italy) Unendo Yamamay Busto Arsizio
19	Elena Perinelli	27 June 1995	1.82 m (6 ft 0 in)	66 kg (146 lb)	299 cm (118 in)	277 cm (109 in)	(Italy) Villa Cortese
20	Ilaria Spirito	20 February 1994	1.74 m (5 ft 9 in)	56 kg (123 lb)	250 cm (98 in)	243 cm (96 in)	
