= Tooker =

Tooker is a surname. Notable people with the surname include:

- Ernest Sidney Tooker (1888–1960), American aviator
- Gabriel Mead Tooker (1839–1905), American lawyer and clubman
- Gary L. Tooker, American businessman
- George Tooker (1920–2011), American painter
- Giles Tooker (c. 1565–1623), English lawyer and politician
- Rhiannon Tooker (born 1990), Australian volleyball player
- William Tooker (1557 or 1558–1621), English churchman and theological writer
- William H. Tooker (1869–1936), American actor
