= Gabriela Chávez =

Gabriela Chávez may refer to:

- Gabriela Chávez (footballer) (born 1989), Argentine footballer
- Gabriela Chávez (volleyball) (born 1994), Mexican volleyball player
