= Zhang Yu =

Zhang Yu may refer to:

- Zhang Yu (Nanhe) (張裕; died 219), courtesy name Nanhe, official serving under the Eastern Han dynasty warlord Liu Bei
- Zhang Yu (general) (張玉; 1343–1401), Ming dynasty general
- Zhang Yu (actress) (张瑜; born 1957), Chinese film actress
- Zhang Yu (hurdler) (张瑜; born 1971), Chinese hurdler
- Zhang Yu (tennis) (born 1976), Chinese tennis player
- Zhang Yu (actor) (章宇, born 1982)
- Zhang Yu (basketball) (张瑜; born 1986), Chinese basketball player
- Zhang Yu (voice actress) (张昱; born 1988), Chinese voice actress known for Overwatch
- Zhang Yu (footballer, born 1994) (张瑀), Chinese footballer
- Zhang Yu (volleyball) (张宇; born 1995), Chinese volleyball player
- Zhang Yu (sport shooter) (born 2000), Chinese sports shooter
- Zhang Yu (footballer, born 2001) (张禹), Chinese footballer

== See also ==
- Phil Chang (張宇; born 1967), Taiwanese singer-songwriter
- Yu Chang (張育成; born 1995), Taiwanese baseball player
- Chang Yu (disambiguation)
