= Tico Sportswear =

Polish sportswear company

Tico (Sportswear)
- Industry: Sportswear
- Founded: 1991; 35 years ago
- Headquarters: Łódź, Poland
- Area served: Poland, Europe
- Number of employees: 20+
- Website: www.tico.com.pl

Tico (Sportswear) (often known as Tico and stylised as TICO) is a Polish sportswear company which provides clothing and equipment for football, volleyball, basketball, handball, tennis, boxing, and wrestling.

Tico held various sponsorships with relatively large clubs in Poland during the early to mid 2000's, sponsoring football teams in Poland's top two divisions such as; Odra Wodzisław, Polonia Warsaw, GKS Bełchatów, Jagiellonia Białystok, Korona Kielce, Wisła Płock, Górnik Łęczna, Legia Warsaw II, and Lechia-Polonia Gdańsk. Since the 2010s Tico has struggled with larger manufacturing brands who can offer clubs more money to wear their kits. As a result, the company's focus was directed more towards sponsorships of high performing teams in other sports, and football teams further down the footballing pyramid.

Tico's most notable sponsorships were with the Poland national football team for the 2002 World Cup Qualifiers and for the Poland Paralympic team at the London 2012 Summer Paralympics Games.

== Sponsorships ==
=== Former sponsorships ===
Football

==== National teams ====
- Poland

==== Club teams ====
- (Poland) GKS Bełchatów
- (Poland) Górnik Łęczna
- (Poland) Jagiellonia Białystok
- (Poland) Korona Kielce
- (Poland) Lechia-Polonia Gdańsk
- (Poland) Legia Warsaw II
- (Poland) Odra Wodzisław
- (Poland) Polonia Warsaw

Volleyball

- (Poland) AZS Częstochowa
- (Poland) Bielsko-Biała
- (Poland) Dąbrowa Górnicza
- (Poland) Jastrzębski Węgiel
- (Poland) KPS Kielce
- (Poland) Murowana Goślina
- (Poland) Trefl Gdańsk

Handball

- (Poland) Wisła Płock
- (Poland) MKS Lublin

Paralympics

- Poland Paralympic team
