= Chang Yu =

Chang Yu may refer to:

- Chang Yu (常玉; 1901–1966), commonly known as Sanyu (painter), Chinese-French painter
- Chang Yu (tennis) (born 1988), Chinese tennis player
- Zhang Yu (disambiguation) (spelled Chang Yü in Wade–Giles), multiple people
- Yu Chang (張育成; born 1995), Taiwanese baseball player
