= Tatyana Mudritskaya =

Kazakhstani volleyball player (born 1985)

Personal information
- Nationality: Kazakhstan
- Born: 17 January 1985 (age 41) Mogilev-Podolskiy, Ukraine
- Height: 1.95 m (6 ft 5 in)
- Weight: 77 kg (170 lb)
- Spike: 310 cm (120 in)
- Block: 300 cm (120 in)

Volleyball information
- Position: Opposite spiker
- Number: 1

National team
- Years: Team
- 2014-: Kazakhstan

Tatyana Mudritskaya (born 17 January 1985 in Mogilev-Podolskiy, Ukraine) is a Kazakhstani female volleyball player. She is a member of the Kazakhstan women's national volleyball team, and played for Schweriner SC in 2014. She was part of the Kazakhstani national team at the 2014 FIVB Volleyball Women's World Championship in Italy.

== Clubs ==
- 1999-2005 (Ukraine) Khimvolokno
- 2005-2007 Galatasaray, Turkey.
- 2007-2008 Rakhat, Kazakhstan.
- 2009 AEL, Limassol, Cyprus
- 2011-2013 Anorthosis, Cyprus
- 2014 (Germany) Schweriner SC
