= Freda López =

Mexican volleyball player (born 1988)

Personal information
- Full name: Freda María López Olmos
- Nationality: Mexican
- Born: 17 June 1988 (age 38)
- Height: 164 cm (65 in)
- Weight: 64 kg (141 lb)
- Spike: 235 cm (93 in)
- Block: 230 cm (91 in)

Volleyball information
- Number: 6 (national team)

Career
Years	Teams
2014	OAXACA

National team
2014	Mexico

Freda María López Olmos (born 17 June 1988) is a Mexican female volleyball player. She is part of the Mexico women's national volleyball team.

She participated in the 2014 FIVB Volleyball World Grand Prix. On club level she played for Oaxaca in 2014.
