= Dinka Kulić =

Croatian volleyball player (born 1997)

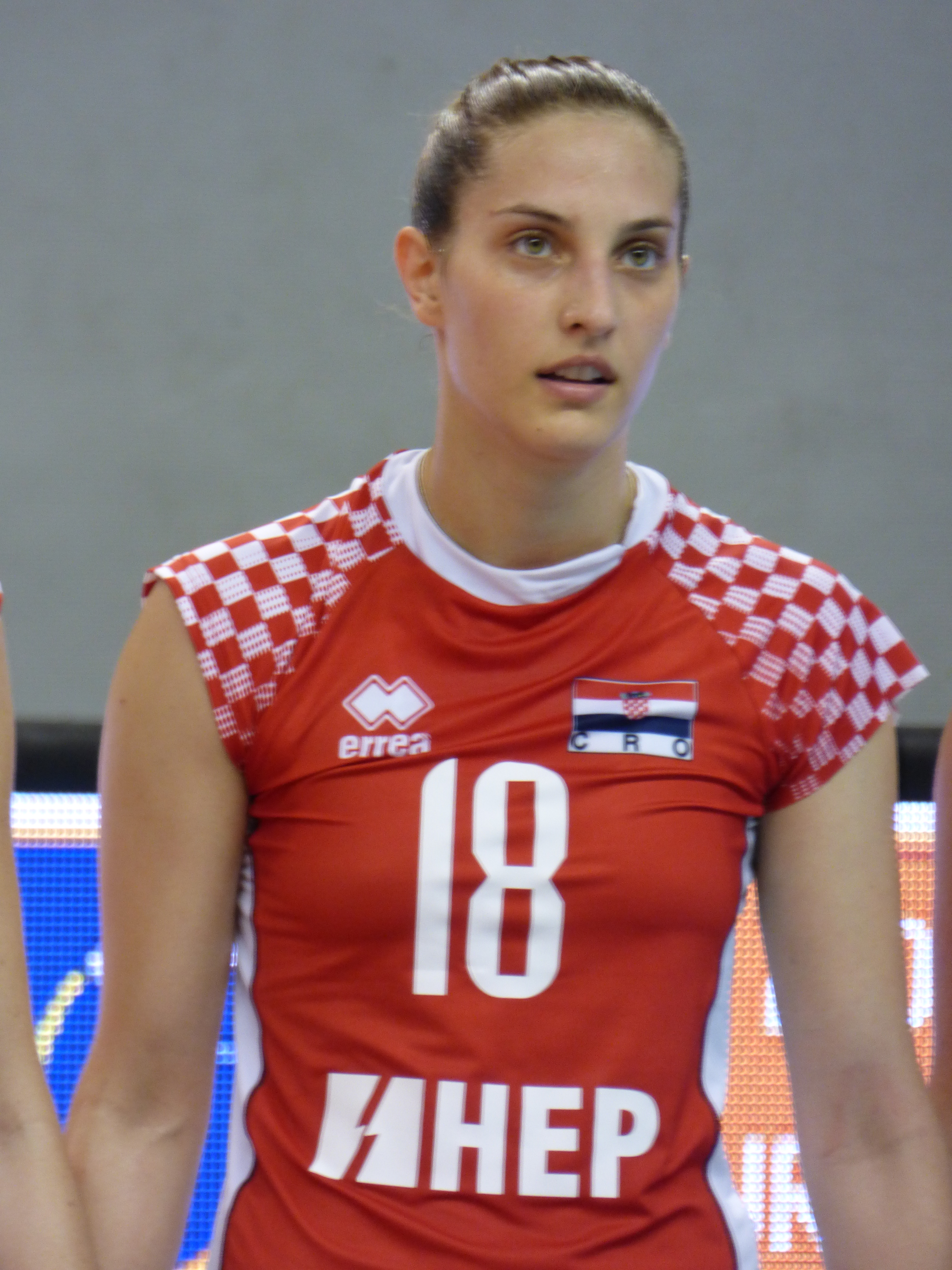

Personal information
- Nationality: Croatian
- Born: 2 August 1997 (age 29)
- Height: 1.87 m (6 ft 2 in)
- Weight: 70 kg (150 lb)
- Spike: 300 cm (120 in)
- Block: 288 cm (113 in)

National team
| 2015 | Croatia |

Dinka Kulić (born 2 August 1997) is a Croatian volleyball player. She is a member of the Croatia women's national volleyball team.

== Career ==
She was part of the Croatian national team at the 2015 FIVB World Grand Prix at the 2015 European Games in Baku. and at the 2021 Women's European Volleyball League, winning a silver medal.

At club level she played for Zok Vibrobeton in 2015, and HAOK Mladost Zagreb from 2016 to 2021.
