= Lindsey Larson =

Canadian volleyball player (born 1994)

Personal information
- Full name: Lindsey Nicole Larson
- Nationality: Canadian
- Born: 29 July 1994 (age 32)
- Hometown: Humboldt, Saskatchewan
- Height: 177 cm (5 ft 10 in)
- Spike: 300 cm (118 in)
- Block: 291 cm (115 in)
- Education: University of Texas at El Paso

Volleyball information
- Position: Setter
- Current club: University of Texas at El Paso
- Number: 16

Career
Years	Teams
2012–	University of Texas at El Paso

National team
2015	Canada

Lindsey Larson (born 29 July 1994) is a Canadian volleyball player. She is part of the Canada women's national volleyball team.

She participated in the 2015 FIVB Volleyball World Grand Prix. On club level she has played for University of Texas at El Paso since 2012.
