= Aleksandra Stepanović =

Serbian volleyball player (born 1994)

Personal information
- Nationality: Serbian
- Born: 1 February 1994 (age 32)
- Height: 170 cm (5 ft 7 in)
- Weight: 67 kg (148 lb)
- Spike: 255 cm (100 in)
- Block: 240 cm (94 in)

Volleyball information
- Number: 22 (national team)

Career
- Years: Team
- 2015: Vizura Beograd

National team
- Years: Team
- 2015: Serbia

Aleksandra Stepanović (born 1 February 1994) is a Serbian volleyball player. She is part of the Serbia women's national volleyball team.

She participated in the 2015 FIVB Volleyball World Grand Prix. On club level she played for Vizura Beograd in 2015.
