= Carla Castiglione =

Argentine female volleyball player

Personal information
- Nationality: Argentine
- Born: 7 March 1989 (age 37)
- Height: 190 cm (75 in)
- Weight: 74 kg (163 lb)
- Spike: 301 cm (119 in)
- Block: 289 cm (114 in)

Volleyball information
- Number: 20 (national team)

Career
Years	Teams
2015	San Lorenzo

National team
2015	Argentina

Carla Castiglione (born 7 March 1989) is an Argentine female volleyball player. She is part of the Argentina women's national volleyball team.

She participated in the 2015 FIVB Volleyball World Grand Prix. At club level she played for San Lorenzo in 2015.
