= Brooke Halvorsen =

Canadian volleyball player (born 1990)

Personal information
- Nationality: Canadian
- Born: 7 February 1990 (age 36)
- Hometown: Surrey, British Columbia
- Height: 175 cm (69 in)
- Spike: 286 cm (113 in)
- Block: 269 cm (106 in)

Volleyball information
- Number: 6 (national team)

Career
Years	Teams
2015	University of Calgary

National team
2015	Canada

Brooke Halvorsen (born 7 February 1990) is a Canadian female volleyball player. She is part of the Canada women's national volleyball team.

She participated in the 2015 FIVB Volleyball World Grand Prix. On club level she played for University of Calgary in 2015.
