= Lindsay McCabe =

Canadian volleyball player (born 1992)

Lindsay Mccabe

Personal information
- Nationality: Canadian
- Born: 3 July 1992 (age 34); Georgetown, Ontario
- Height: 185 cm (73 in)
- Spike: 307 cm (121 in)
- Block: 298 cm (117 in)

Volleyball information
- Number: 24 (national team)

Career
Years	Teams
2015	Syracuse University

National team
2015	Canada

Lindsay Mccabe (born 3 July 1992) is a Canadian female volleyball player. She is part of the Canada women's national volleyball team.

She participated in the 2015 FIVB Volleyball World Grand Prix. On club level she played for Syracuse University in 2015.
