= Libys Marmolejo =

Colombian volleyball player (born 1992)

Personal information
- Nationality: Colombian
- Born: 9 May 1992 (age 34)
- Height: 181 cm (5 ft 11 in)
- Weight: 53 kg (117 lb)
- Spike: 287 cm (113 in)
- Block: 282 cm (111 in)

Career
Years	Teams
2015	Liga Antioqueña

National team
2015	Colombia

Libys Marmolejo (born 9 May 1992) is a Colombian volleyball player. She is part of the Colombia women's national volleyball team.

She participated in the 2015 FIVB Volleyball World Grand Prix. On club level she played for Liga Antioqueña in 2015.
