= Anja Brandt =

German volleyball player (born 1990)

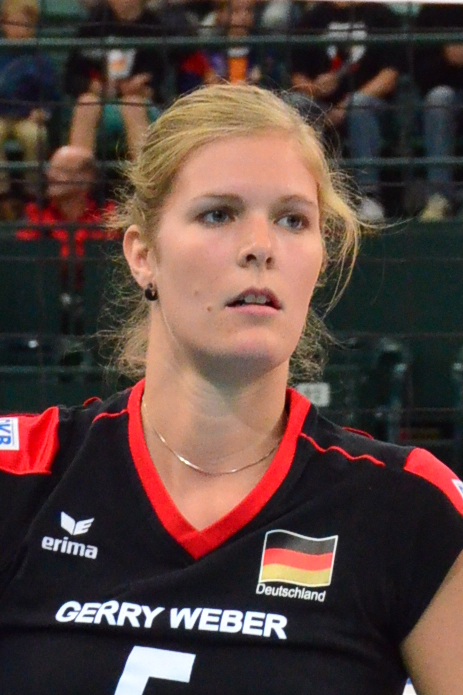
- Brandt in 2013

Personal information
- Nationality: German
- Born: 15 February 1990 (age 36); Hamburg, Germany
- Height: 1.95 m (6 ft 5 in)
- Weight: 77 kg (170 lb)
- Spike: 310 cm (122 in)
- Block: 295 cm (116 in)

Volleyball information
- Position: middle blocker
- Number: 16

Career
Years	Teams
2015	(Germany) Schweriner SC

National team
2010	Germany
Medal record
Women's volleyball
Representing Germany
European Championship
Silver medal – second place	2013 Germany	Team

Anja Brandt (born 15 February 1990) is a retired German female volleyball player. She was part of the Germany women's national volleyball team.

She participated in the 2010 FIVB Volleyball Women's World Championship. She played with Schweriner SC.

== Clubs ==
- (Germany) VG Elmshorn (2005–2006)
- (Germany) VC Olympia Berlin (2006–2009)
- (Germany) Schweriner SC (2009–Present)
