= Ljiljana Ranković =

Serbian volleyball player (born 1993)

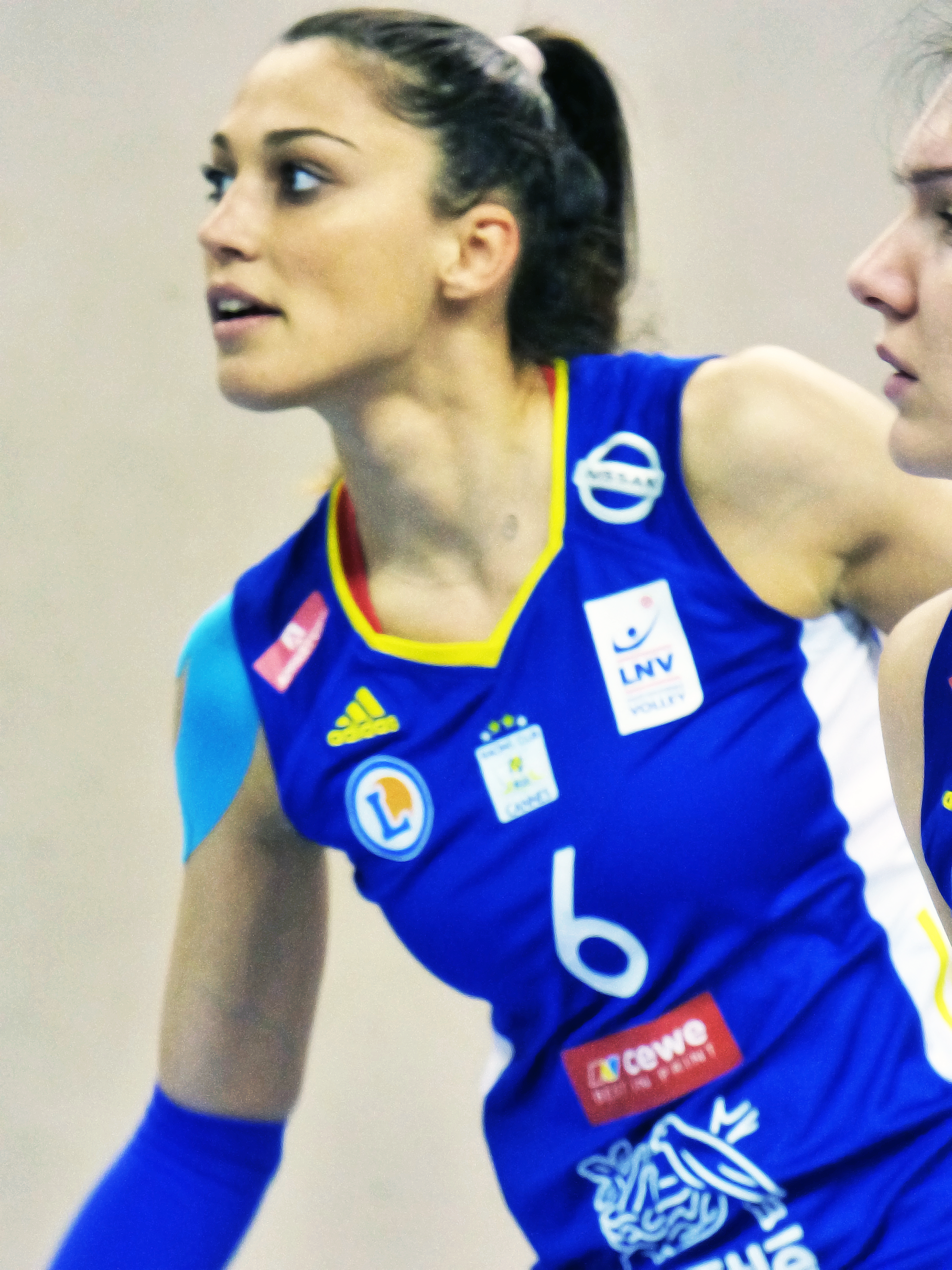

Personal information
- Nationality: Serbian
- Born: 8 April 1993 (age 33); Valjevo, FR Yugoslavia
- Height: 181 cm (71 in)
- Weight: 72 kg (159 lb)
- Spike: 295 cm (116 in)
- Block: 280 cm (110 in)

Career
Years	Teams
2007–2016	(Serbia) OK Vizura Belgrade
2016–2017	(France) ESCR Le Cannet
2017–2020	(France) RC Cannes
2021-	(Serbia) ŽOK Ub

National team
2015	Serbia

Ljiljana Ranković (born 8 April 1993 in Valjevo) is a Serbian volleyball player. She played for the Serbia women's national volleyball team.

Ranković joined the OK Vizura Belgrade when she was only 14, and has won three national titles with the club. She only spent the 2014/15 season on a loan with the Smeč 5 from Kragujevac, recovering from an injury and helping them establish themselves in the national league. She stayed with Vizura until 2016. As the team captain, she led Vizura in the 2016 victory in the national cup and was named MVP of the season for the 2015/16 season. For the 2016/17 season, she signed for French side ESCR from Le Cannet where she finished the 2016-2017 season as runner-up in the French championship. For the 2017/18 season, she signed for RC Cannes.

In the junior national teams, Ranković has won a silver at both Cadet and Junior European Championships, as well as a silver on the World Junior Championships in Thailand, won by Brazil. She played for the national team at the 2015 World Grand Prix.

== Sporting achievements ==
=== Clubs ===
==== National championships ====
- 2015/2016 Serbian Championship, with Vizura Beograd
- 2016/2017 French Championship, with ESCR Le Cannet
- 2017/2018 French Cup, with RC Cannes
- 2017/2018 French Championship, with RC Cannes

=== National team ===
- Cadet European Championship
- Junior European Championship
- World Junior Championships
