= Brittany Jack =

Australian volleyball player (born 1994)

Personal information
- Nationality: Australian
- Born: 21 May 1994 (age 32)
- Height: 168 cm (66 in)
- Weight: 66 kg (146 lb)
- Spike: 283 cm (111 in)
- Block: 278 cm (109 in)

Volleyball information
- Number: 20 (national team)

Career
Years	Teams
2015	UTSSU

National team
2015	Australia

Brittany Jack (born 21 May 1994) is an Australian female volleyball player. She is part of the Australia women's national volleyball team.

She participated in the 2015 FIVB Volleyball World Grand Prix. On club level she played for UTSSU in 2015.
