= Adela Helić =

Serbian volleyball player (born 1990)

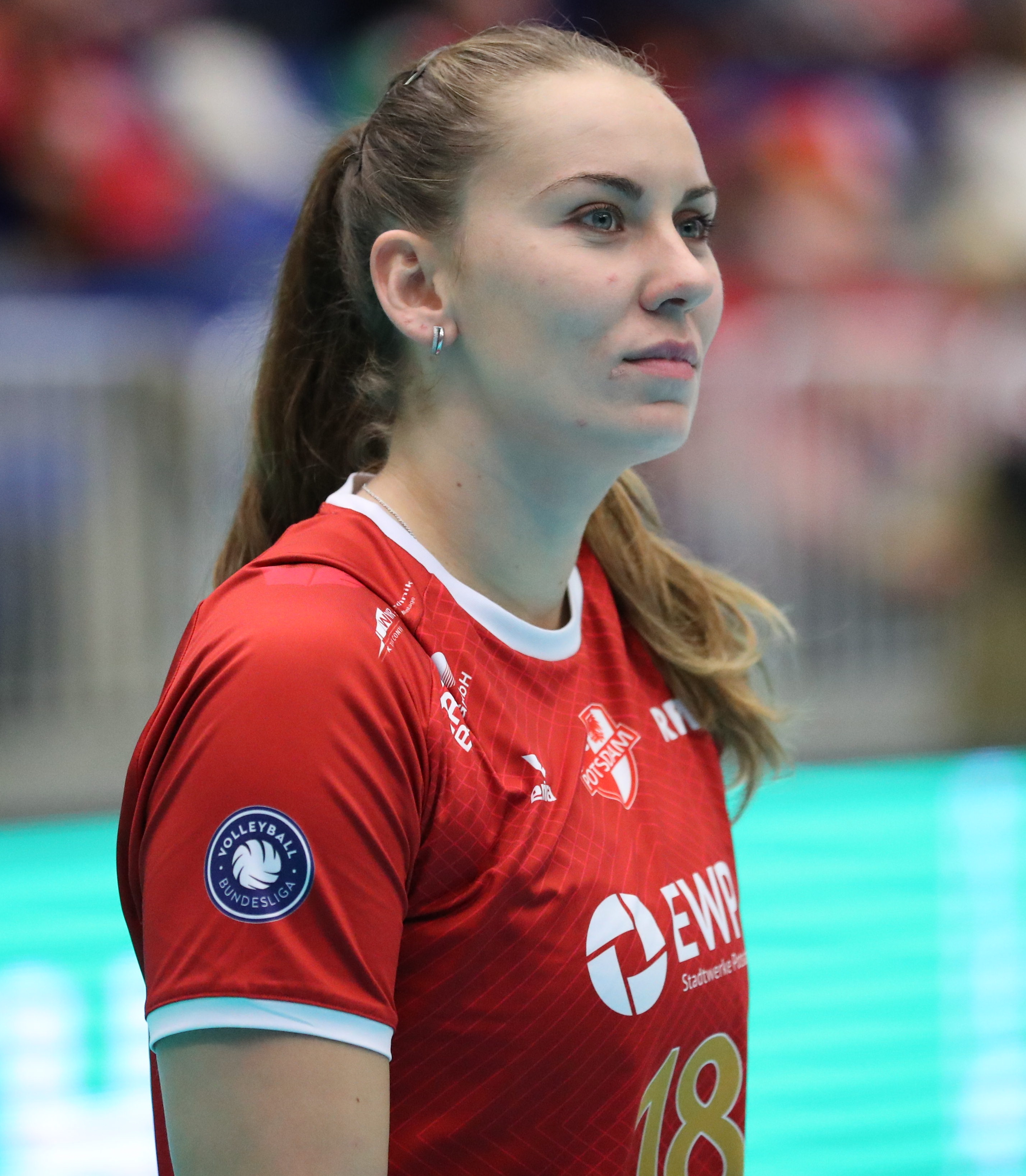

Personal information
- Nationality: Serbian
- Born: 24 February 1990 (age 36)
- Height: 185 cm (6 ft 1 in)
- Weight: 78 kg (172 lb)
- Spike: 310 cm (122 in)
- Block: 300 cm (118 in)

Volleyball information
- Number: 25 (national team)

Career
- Years: Team
- 2015: OK Crvena Zvezda

National team
- Years: Team
- 2015: Serbia

Adela Helić (born 24 February 1990) is a Serbian volleyball player. She was part of the Serbia women's national volleyball team.

She participated in the 2015 FIVB Volleyball World Grand Prix. On club level she played for OK Crvena Zvezda in 2015.
