= Aleksandra Cvetićanin =

Serbian volleyball player (born 1993)

Personal information
- Nationality: Serbian
- Born: 5 April 1993 (age 33) Zrenjanin
- Home town: Žitište
- Height: 186 cm (6 ft 1 in)
- Weight: 74 kg (163 lb)
- Spike: 290 cm (114 in)
- Block: 278 cm (109 in)

Volleyball information
- Position: receiver
- Current club: Jászberényi RK
- Number: 24 (national team)

Career
- Years: Team
- 2015: NIS Spartak Subotica

National team
- Years: Team
- 2015: Serbia

Aleksandra Cvetićanin (born 5 April 1993) is a Serbian volleyball player. She is part of the Serbia women's national volleyball team.

She participated in the 2015 FIVB Volleyball World Grand Prix. On club level she played for NIS Spartak Subotica in 2015.
