= Marija Prša =

Croatian volleyball player

Personal information
- Nationality: Croatian
- Born: 27 November 1989 (age 36); Sisak
- Height: 1.78 m (5 ft 10 in)
- Weight: 68 kg (150 lb)
- Spike: 218 cm (86 in)
- Block: 280 cm (110 in)
- Education: Florida International University

National team
2015	Croatia

Marija Prša (born Sisak, 27 November 1989) is a Croatian volleyball player. She is a member of the Croatia women's national volleyball team and played for Volley 2002 Forlì in 2014.

== Career ==
She was part of the Croatian national team at the 2015 FIVB World Grand Prix.

She played for Florida International University.

== Clubs ==
Club	From	To
Croatia OK Sisak	2004-2005	2005-2006
Croatia ŽOK Azena Velika Gorica	2006-2007	2008-2009
United States Florida International University	2009-2010	2011-2012
Croatia Mladost Zagreb	January 2013	May 2013
Greece ASP Iones	September 2013	December 2013
Italy Pallavolo Ornavasso	February 2014	May 2014
Italy Volley 2002 Forlì	2014-2015	2014-2015
