= Risa Shiragaki =

Japanese volleyball player (born 1991)

Personal information
- Nationality: Japanese
- Born: 30 July 1991 (age 35); Kumamoto, Kumamoto, Japan
- Height: 179 cm (70 in)
- Weight: 64 kg (141 lb)
- Spike: 304 cm (120 in)
- Block: 290 cm (114 in)

Volleyball information
- Number: 24 (national team)

Career
Years	Teams
2015	NEC Red Rockets

National team
2015	Japan

Risa Shiragaki (born 30 July 1991) is a Japanese female volleyball player. She is part of the Japan women's national volleyball team.

She participated in the 2015 FIVB Volleyball World Grand Prix. On club level she played for NEC Red Rockets in 2015.
