= KS Piecobiogaz Murowana Goślina =

KS Murowana Goślina
- Full name: Klub Sportowy Murowana Goślina
- Founded: 2009
- Ground: Hala widowiskowo-sportowa, Murowana Goślina, Poland (Capacity: 436)
- Chairman: Andrzej Piontek
- League: II Liga Kobiet
- Website: Club home page

Uniforms
Home	Away

KS Murowana Goślina is a Polish women's volleyball club based in Murowana Goślina and plays in the women's II Liga (third division).

== Previous names ==
Due to sponsorship, the club have competed under the following names:

- KS Murowana Goślina (2009–2010)
- KS Piecobiogaz Murowana Goślina (2010–2013)
- KS Murowana Goślina (2013–present)

== History ==
Although only formed in 2009, the club's origin dates back to 1992 when sport classes in Murowana Goślina schools were established and in order to develop the players skills the Uczniowski Klub Sportowy "Zielone Wzgórza" (Student Sports Club "Green Hills" in English) was formed in 1994. The opportunity have a team playing in the national league came in 2009, when the city of Murowana Goślina received the right to play in the women's II Liga (third division) from club AZS AWF Poznań under an agreement signed on 6 April 2009, effectively creating Klub Sportowy Murowana Goślina. In its first season (2009–10) the club won promotion to the women's I Liga (second division). Ahead of the 2016–17 season, due to financial issues, the club entered the women's II Liga after conceding its right to play in the women's I Liga to MKS Kalisz.

== Team ==
Season 2015–2016.

Number	Player	Position	Height (m)	Weight (kg)	Birth date
1	(Poland) Justyna Zemlik	Opposite	1.87		30 November 1995 (age 29)
2	(Poland) Sylwia Kucharska	Setter	1.78		8 November 1995 (age 29)
3	(Poland) Judyta Szulc	Setter	1.75		10 August 1986 (age 38)
5	(Poland) Paulina Stroiwąs	Middle blocker	1.97		17 May 1994 (age 30)
6	(Poland) Dominika Żółtańska	Outside hitter	1.80		29 January 1987 (age 38)
7	(Poland) Katarzyna Kiestrzyńska	Outside hitter	1.81		19 January 1995 (age 30)
9	(Poland) Patrycja Grocholewska	Middle blocker	1.88		18 August 1995 (age 29)
10	(Poland) Paulina Majkowska	Middle blocker	1.85		6 February 1995 (age 30)
11	(Poland) Edyta Mazurczak	Outside hitter	1.78		9 October 1996 (age 28)
12	(Poland) Aleksandra Elko	Libero	1.75		12 November 1995 (age 29)
13	(Poland) Katarzyna Siwek	Outside hitter	1.77		3 February 1992 (age 33)
16	(Poland) Martyna Tracz	Libero	1.70		16 April 1992 (age 32)
Coach: (Poland) Piotr Sobolewski

2010–2011 Team
Number	Player	Position	Height (cm)
1.	(Poland) Katarzyna Walawender	Wing Spiker	1.79
2.	(Poland) Aleksandra Trojan	Middle Blocker	1.95
3.	(Poland) Magdalena Fedorów	Middle Blocker	1.82
4.	(Poland) Natalia Gałązka	Setter	1.71
5.	(Poland) Paulina Dutkiewicz-Raś	Middle Blocker	1.92
6.	(Poland) Małgorzata Jeromin	Setter	1.79
7.	(Poland) Patrycja Wyrwa	Wing Spiker	1.82
9.	(Poland) Beata Strządała	Wing Spiker	1.90
10.	(Poland) Paulina Chojnacka	Opposite	1.84
11.	(Poland) Natalia Narożna	Libero	1.66
12.	(Belarus) (Poland) Olga Ovczynnikova	Setter	1.81
14.	(Poland) Dominika Nowakowska	Wing Spiker / Libero	1.81
15.	(Poland) Alicja Malinowska	Opposite	1.86
16.	(Poland) Małgorzata Lubera	Middle Blocker	1.86
Coach: (Poland) Jacek Skrok
