= Gabriela Coneo =

Colombian volleyball player (born 1993)

Personal information
- Nationality: Colombian
- Born: 4 May 1993 (age 33); Cartagena, Colombia
- Height: 180 cm (5 ft 11 in)
- Weight: 60 kg (132 lb)
- Spike: 304 cm (120 in)
- Block: 293 cm (115 in)

Career
Years	Teams
2010-2015	Liga Bolivarense

National team
2015	Colombia

Gabriela Coneo (born 4 May 1993) is a Colombian volleyball player. She is part of the Colombia women's national volleyball team.

== Career ==
With Bolivar, she won the 2010 National Championship. She won the silver medal in the 2011 Colombia Junior Championship, representing Bolivar.

She won the 2013 Colombian Championship in the senior category with Bolivar. She won the 2014 U22 South American Championship silver medal and Best Outside Hitter award She helped her national team to end up in the sixth place in the volleyball tournament held in the 2014 Central American and Caribbean Games in Veracruz, Mexico.

She participated in the 2015 FIVB Volleyball World Grand Prix. On club level she played for Liga Bolivarense in 2015. Coneo partnered with Paula Martínez to win the silver medal of the 2016 King of Kings Beach Volleyball Tournament.
