= Rebecca Reeve =

Australian volleyball player (born 1994)

Personal information
- Nationality: Australia
- Born: 23 May 1994 (age 32); Adelaide, Australia
- Height: 183 cm (6 ft 0 in)
- Weight: 69 kg (152 lb)
- Spike: 294 cm (116 in)
- Block: 283 cm (111 in)
- Education: Blinn College; University of Tulsa

Volleyball information
- Position: Outside hitter

Career
Years	Teams
2013–2014	(United States) Blinn College
2015–2016	(United States) University of Tulsa

National team
2014	Australia

Rebecca Reeve (born 23 May 1994) is an Australian female volleyball player. She is part of the Australia women's national volleyball team.

She participated in the 2014 FIVB Volleyball World Grand Prix. On club level she played for Blinn College in 2014.
