= Paula López =

Mexican volleyball player (born 1991)

Personal information
- Nationality: Mexican
- Born: 4 January 1991 (age 35)
- Height: 173 cm (5 ft 8 in)
- Weight: 60 kg (132 lb)
- Spike: 284 cm (112 in)
- Block: 258 cm (102 in)

Career
Years	Teams
2015	Coahuila

National team
2015	Mexico

Paula López (born 4 January 1991) is a Mexican female volleyball player. She is part of the Mexico women's national volleyball team.

She participated in the 2015 FIVB Volleyball World Grand Prix. On club level she played for Coahuila in 2015.
