= Alena Popova =

Kazakhstani volleyball player (born 1997)

Personal information
- Nationality: Kazakhstani
- Born: 21 March 1997 (age 29)
- Height: 182 cm (72 in)
- Weight: 66 kg (146 lb)
- Spike: 291 cm (115 in)
- Block: 275 cm (108 in)

Volleyball information
- Number: 15 (national team)

Career
- Years: Team
- 2015: Karaganda

National team
- Years: Team
- 2015: Kazakhstan

Alena Popova (born 21 March 1997) is a Kazakhstani female volleyball player. She is part of the Kazakhstan women's national volleyball team.

She participated in the 2015 FIVB Volleyball World Grand Prix. On club level she played for Karaganda in 2015.
