= Aleksandra Trojan =

Polish volleyball player (born 1991)

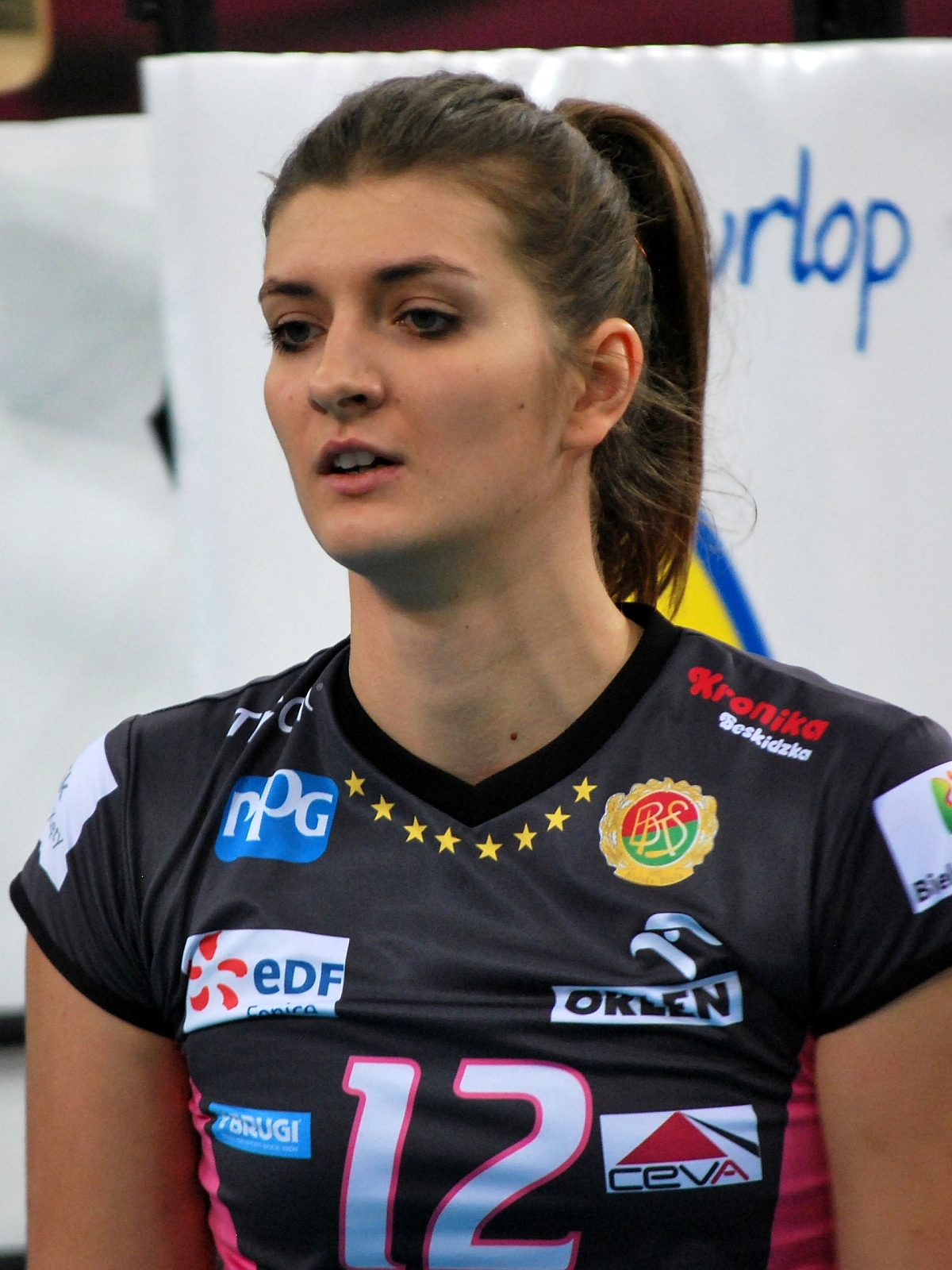

Personal information
- Nationality: Polish
- Born: 6 June 1991 (age 35); Dobczyce, Poland
- Height: 193 cm (76 in)
- Weight: 68 kg (150 lb)
- Spike: 306 cm (120 in)
- Block: 293 cm (115 in)

Volleyball information
- Number: 6 (national team)

Career
Years	Teams
2015	BKS SA

National team
2015	Poland

Aleksandra Trojan (born 6 June 1991) is a Polish volleyball player. She is part of the Poland women's national volleyball team.

She participated in the 2015 FIVB Volleyball World Grand Prix. On club level she played for BKS SA in 2015.
