= Natsumi Fujita =

Japanese volleyball player (born 1991)

Personal information
- Full name: Natsumi Fujita
- Nickname: Natsu
- Born: August 5, 1991 (age 35); Tagajo, Miyagi, Japan
- Height: 1.66 m (5 ft 5 in)
- Weight: 50 kg (110 lb)
- Spike: 270 cm (106 in)
- Block: 261 cm (103 in)

Volleyball information
- Position: Setter
- Current club: Toyota Auto Body Queenseis
- Number: 4

National team
Japan 2013-

Natsumi Fujita (藤田 夏未 Fujita Natsumi, born August 5, 1991) is a Japanese volleyball player who plays for Toyota Auto Body Queenseis. She also plays for the All-Japan women's volleyball team.

Fujita played for the All-Japan team for the first time at the Montreux Volley Masters in May 2013.

== Clubs ==
- (Japan) Takasaki Junior High
- (Japan) Furukawa Gakuen Highschool
- (Japan) Toyota Auto Body Queenseis (2010-)

== Awards ==
=== Individual ===
- 2014 63rd Kurowashiki All Japan Volleyball Tournament Best6

=== Clubs ===
- 2011 Empress's Cup - Runner-Up, with Toyota Auto Body.
- 2014 63rd Kurowashiki All Japan Volleyball Tournament Champion, with Toyota Auto body.
