= Denise Hanke =

German volleyball player (born 1989)

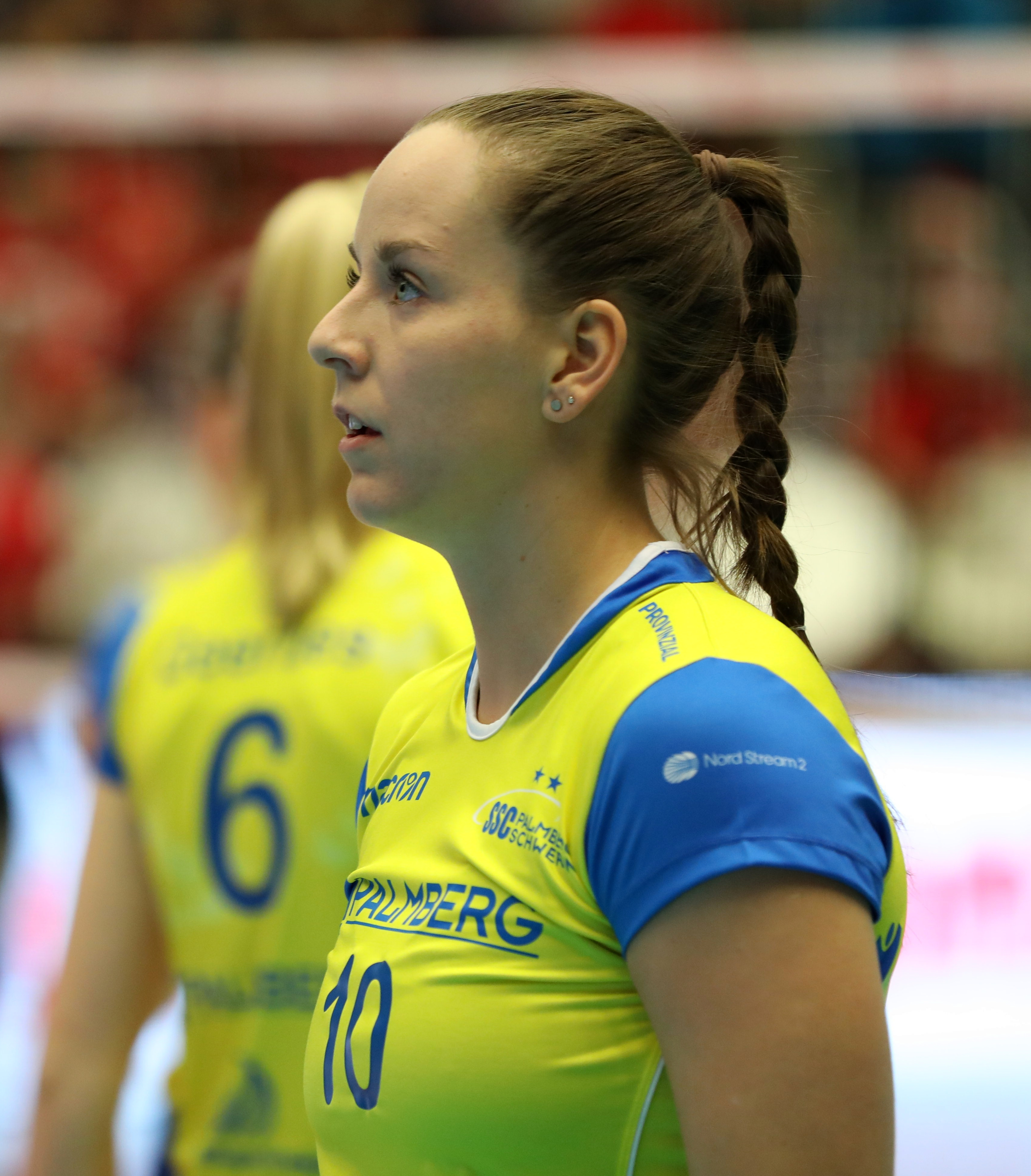

Personal information
- Nationality: German
- Born: 31 August 1989 (age 37); Berlin, Germany
- Height: 1.80 m (5 ft 11 in)
- Weight: 58 kg (128 lb)
- Spike: 284 cm (112 in)
- Block: 272 cm (107 in)

Volleyball information
- Position: Setter
- Number: 3

Career
Teams
	(Germany) Schweriner SC

National team
?-2020	Germany
Medal record
Women's volleyball
Representing Germany
European Championship
Silver medal – second place	2013 Germany	Team
FIVB Grand Prix
Bronze medal – third place	2009 Tokyo	Team

Denise Hanke (born 31 August 1989) is a German volleyball player. She is a member of the Germany women's national volleyball team and is playing for Schweriner SC.

On 29 April 2020 Denise announced her retirement from volleyball.
