= Kana Ōno =

Japanese volleyball player

Personal information
- Nickname: sawa
- Nationality: Japan
- Born: 30 June 1992 (age 34); Misawa, Aomori, Japan
- Height: 1.80 m (5 ft 11 in)
- Weight: 70 kg (150 lb)
- Spike: 297 cm (117 in)
- Block: 283 cm (111 in)

Volleyball information
- Position: Middle Blocker
- Current club: NEC Red Rockets
- Number: 12

National team
2013-	Japan

Kana Ōno (大野 果奈, Ōno Kana, born 30 June 1992) is a female volleyball player from Japan. Kana plays for NEC Red Rockets and also plays for Japan women's national volleyball team as Middle Blocker.

== Career ==
Kana was born in Misawa, Aomori Prefecture as a twin sister. Her elder sister is Kaho Ōno who plays now for Toray Arrows. Kaho and Kana are called "Ōno Twins"(大野ツインズ). Ōno Twins became volleyball players at 7 years old. While attending the Furukawagakuen Highschool, Ōno Twins and their volleyball team won the 2010 Inter-highschool championships and the National Sports Festival of Japan (highschool department), and also won a silver medal at the Inter-highschool Tournament.

On 11 January 2011 NEC Red Rockets announced Kana's joining next season.

In 2011-12 V.Premier League Kana played as regular middle blocker, and won the first place in the regular season. She won the silver medal at the 2013 Kurowashiki All Japan Volleyball Tournament. In April 2013 Kana was selected to the national team.

In 2014 Kana competed at 2014 Montreux Volley Masters and won the silver medal at 2014 FIVB World Grand Prix.

== Anti-doping rule violation ==
In 2015 Kana was suspended for 2 months after a sample of hers was found positive for Tulobuterol.

== Awards ==
=== Team ===
- 2013 Kurowashiki All Japan Volleyball Tournament - Runner-Up, with NEC Red Rockets

=== National team ===
- 2014 FIVB World Grand Prix - Silver medal

== Clubs ==
- (Japan) Sabishiro volleyball club
- (Japan) Municipal Misawa secondary Junior High (2005-)
- (Japan) Furukawagakuen Senior High (2008-)
- (Japan) NEC Red Rockets (2011-)
