= Schweriner SC =

SSC Palmberg Schwerin
- Full name: Schweriner SC
- Founded: 1957
- Ground: Palmberg Arena (Capacity: 2,200)
- Manager: Felix Koslowski
- League: German Volleyball League
- 2016–17: 1st
- Website: Club home page

Uniforms
Home	Away

Schweriner SC, also known as SSC Schwerin, is a German professional sports club based in Schwerin, Mecklenburg-Vorpommern. It is mostly known for its women's volleyball department which plays in the German Volleyball League having won it many times.

== Women's volleyball ==
The team has won many titles including the National Championship and Cup of East Germany, the National Championship (Bundesliga) and Cup of Germany, the CEV Champions League and the CEV Cup Winners Cup (now called CEV Cup).

=== Previous names ===
Due to sponsorship, the club have competed under the following names:

- SC Traktor Schwerin (1957–1991)
- Schweriner SC and SSC Schwerin (1991–2016)
- SSC Palmberg Schwerin (2016–present)

=== Honours ===
==== National competitions ====
- East German Championship: 7

1976, 1977, 1980, 1981, 1982, 1983, 1984

- East German Cup: 4

1981, 1982, 1988, 1990

- German Championship: 11

1995, 1998, 2000, 2001, 2002, 2006, 2009, 2011, 2012, 2013, 2017

- German Cup: 5

2001, 2006, 2007, 2012, 2013

==== International competitions ====
- CEV Champions League: 1

1977–78

- Cup Winners Cup: 1

1974–75

=== Team squad ===
Season 2018–2019, as of May 2019.

Number	Player	Position	Height (m)	Weight (kg)	Birth date
1	(Hungary) Gréta Szakmáry	Outside Hitter	1.86	71	31 December 1991 (age 34)
2	(Germany) Maren Fromm	Outside Hitter	1.84	68	10 July 1986 (age 39)
3	(Bulgaria) Ralina Doshkova	Opposite	1.88	69	7 June 1995 (age 30)
4	(Germany) Anna Pogany	Libero	1.68	61	21 July 1994 (age 31)
5	(Netherlands) Tessa Polder	Middle Blocker	1.89	76	10 October 1997 (age 28)
6	(Germany) Jennifer Geerties	Outside Hitter	1.86	66	5 April 1994 (age 31)
7	(Netherlands) Britt Bongaerts	Setter	1.85	68	3 November 1996 (age 29)
8	(Germany) Kimberly Drewniok	Opposite	1.88	73	11 August 1997 (age 28)
9	(Japan) Nanaka Sakamoto	Outside Hitter	1.76	62	6 September 1996 (age 29)
10	(Germany) Denise Hanke	Setter	1.83	76	31 August 1989 (age 36)
11	(Croatia) Beta Dumancic	Middle Blocker	1.90	80	26 March 1991 (age 34)
12	(United States) Lauren Barfield	Middle Blocker	1.96	89	15 March 1990 (age 35)
13	(United States) Adams McKenzie	Outside Spiker	1.90	78	13 February 1992 (age 34)
14	(Germany) Elisa Lohmann	Libero	1.75	61	22 July 1998 (age 27)
16	(Germany) Marie Schölzel	Middle Blocker	1.93	70	1 August 1997 (age 28)
18	(Germany) Lea Ambrosius	Middle Blocker	1.89	79	22 May 2000 (age 25)
19	(Thailand) Pimpichaya Kokram	Opposite spiker	1.80	62	16 June 1998 (age 27)
Coach: (Germany) Felix Koslowski

== Players ==
- Lucia Hatinova
- Vendula Adlerova
- Laetitia Moma Bassoko
- Pauliina Vilponen
- Kaisa Alanko
- Patricia Llabres Herrera

== See also ==
- Germany women's national volleyball team
