= Arisa Takada =

Japanese volleyball player (born 1987)

Personal information
- Full name: Arisa Takada
- Nickname: Arisa
- Born: February 17, 1987 (age 39); Isahaya, Nagasaki, Japan
- Height: 1.75 m (5 ft 9 in)
- Weight: 67 kg (148 lb)
- Spike: 285 cm (112 in)
- Block: 278 cm (109 in)

Volleyball information
- Position: Wing Spiker
- Current club: Toray Arrows
- Number: 4

Arisa Takada (高田ありさ Takada Arisa, born February 17, 1987) is a Japanese volleyball player who plays for Toray Arrows.

== Clubs ==
- (Japan) Kyushubunka high school
- (Japan) Toray Arrows (2005-)

== Awards ==
=== Team ===
- 2007 Domestic Sports Festival (Volleyball) - Champion, with Toray Arrows.
- 2007-2008 Empress's Cup - Champion, with Toray Arrows.
- 2007-2008 V.Premier League - Champion, with Toray Arrows.
- 2008 Domestic Sports Festival - Runner-Up, with Toray Arrows.
- 2008-2009 V.Premier League - Champion, with Toray Arrows.
- 2009 Kurowashiki All Japan Volleyball Championship - Champion, with Toray Arrows.
- 2009-2010 V.Premier League - Champion, with Toray Arrows.
- 2010 Kurowashiki All Japan Volleyball Championship - Champion, with Toray Arrows.
- 2010-11 V.Premier League - Runner-up, with Toray Arrows.

=== National team ===
- 2014 FIVB World Grand Prix - Silver medal
