= Tessa Polder =

Dutch volleyball player

Personal information
- Nationality: Dutch
- Born: 10 October 1997 (age 29); Capelle aan den IJssel, Netherlands
- Height: 1.89 m (6 ft 2 in)
- Weight: 76 kg (168 lb)
- Spike: 301 cm (119 in)
- Block: 293 cm (115 in)

Volleyball information
- Position: Middle-blocker
- Current club: Ladies in Black Aachen
- Number: 5

National team
| Netherlands |
Honours
European Championship
| Silver medal – second place | 2017 Azerbaijan/Georgia |

Tessa Polder (born 10 October 1997) is a Dutch volleyball player for ASPTT Mulhouse and the Dutch national team.

She participated at the 2017 Women's European Volleyball Championship.
