= Ralina Doshkova =

Bulgarian volleyball player (born 1995)

Personal information
- Nationality: Bulgarian
- Born: 7 June 1995 (age 31)
- Height: 188 cm (74 in)
- Weight: 64 kg (141 lb)
- Spike: 303 cm (119 in)
- Block: 295 cm (116 in)

Volleyball information
- Number: 25 (national team)

Career
Years	Teams
2015	VC CSKA Sofia

National team
2015	Bulgaria

Ralina Doshkova (Bulgarian: Ралина Дошкова) (born 7 June 1995) is a Bulgarian female volleyball player. She is part of the Bulgaria women's national volleyball team.

She participated in the 2015 FIVB Volleyball World Grand Prix. On club level she played for VC CSKA Sofia in 2015.
