= Anna Matiyenko =

Russian volleyball player (born 1981)

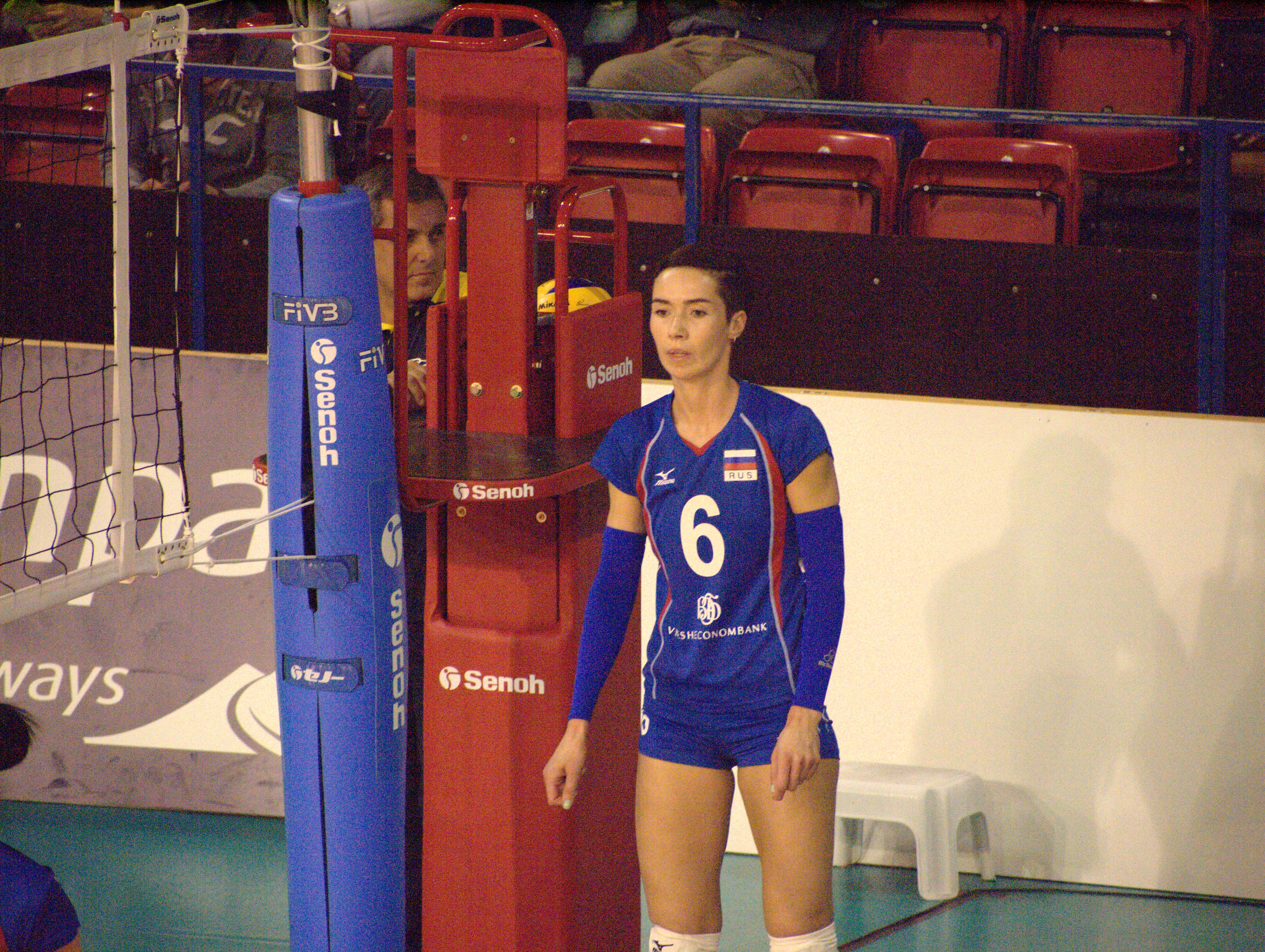

Personal information
- Born: July 12, 1981 (age 45); Prokhladny, Kabardino-Balkarian Republic
- Height: 182 cm (6 ft 0 in)
- Weight: 68 kg (150 lb)

Volleyball information
- Current club: Leningradka Saint Petersburg
- Number: 6

Anna Matiyenko (born 12 July 1981 in Prokhladny, Kabardino-Balkarian Republic) is a Russian volleyball player. At the 2012 Summer Olympics, she competed for the Russia women's national volleyball team in the women's event.
