= Rhiannon Tooker =

Australian volleyball player (born 1990)

Rhiannon Rosalynd Tooker

Personal information
- Nationality: Australian
- Born: 17 January 1990 (age 36)
- Height: 195 cm (77 in)
- Weight: 83 kg (183 lb)
- Spike: 305 cm (120 in)
- Block: 294 cm (116 in)

Volleyball information
- Number: 5 (national team)

Career
| Years | Teams |
|---|---|
| 2015 | Queensland Pirates |

National team
| 2015 | Australia |

Rhiannon Rosalynd Tooker (born 17 January 1990) is an Australian female volleyball player. She is part of the Australia women's national volleyball team.

She participated in the 2015 FIVB Volleyball World Grand Prix. On club level she played for Queensland Pirates in 2015.
