= Linda Dörendahl =

German volleyball player (born 1984)

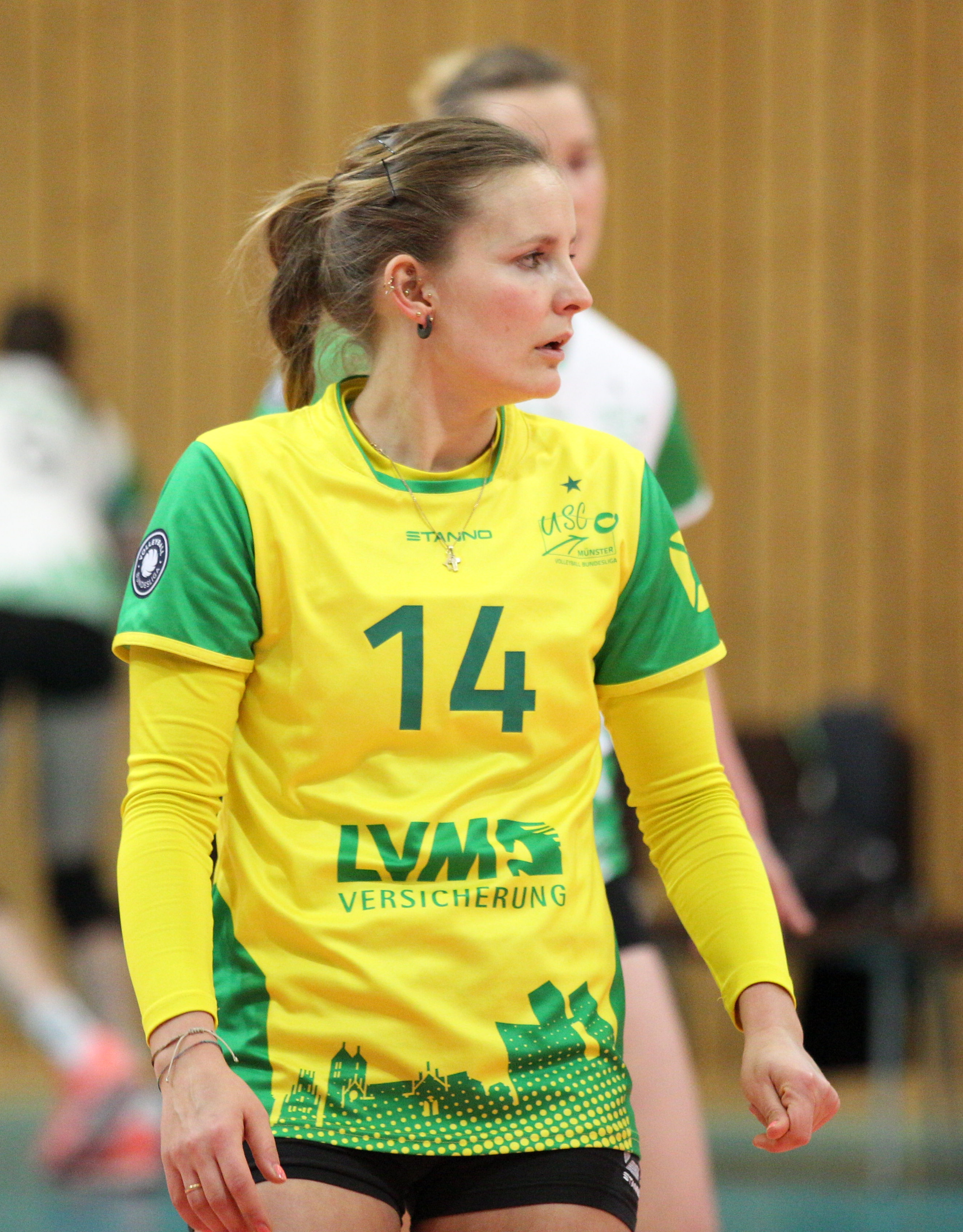
- Linda Dörendahl (2017)

Personal information
- Nationality: German
- Born: 20 July 1984 (age 42)
- Height: 176 cm (69 in)
- Weight: 60 kg (132 lb)
- Spike: 292 cm (115 in)
- Block: 276 cm (109 in)

Volleyball information
- Number: 8 (national team)

Career
Years	Teams
2015	USC Münster

National team
2015	Germany

Linda Dörendahl (born 20 July 1984) is a German female volleyball player. She is part of the Germany women's national volleyball team.

She participated in the 2015 FIVB Volleyball World Grand Prix. On club level she played for USC Münster in 2015.
