= Gabriela Chávez (volleyball) =

Mexican volleyball player (born 1994)

Personal information
- Nationality: Mexican
- Born: 30 September 1994 (age 32)
- Height: 174 cm (5 ft 9 in)
- Weight: 70 kg (154 lb)
- Spike: 265 cm (104 in)
- Block: 254 cm (100 in)

Career
Years	Teams
2015	Nuevo León

National team
2015	Mexico

Gabriela Chávez (born 30 September 1994) is a Mexican female volleyball player. She is part of the Mexico women's national volleyball team.

She participated in the 2015 FIVB Volleyball World Grand Prix. On club level she played for Nuevo León in 2015.
