= Zhang Yu (volleyball) =

Chinese volleyball player (born 1995)

Personal information
- Nationality: Chinese
- Born: 25 September 1995 (age 31)
- Height: 1.96 m (6 ft 5 in)
- Weight: 71 kg (157 lb)
- Spike: 320 cm (130 in)
- Block: 320 cm (130 in)

Volleyball information
- Number: 25

National team
- Years: Team
- –: China
Honours
Representing China
Chinese name
Simplified Chinese	张宇
Traditional Chinese	張宇
Hanyu Pinyin	Zhāng Yǔ

Zhang Yu (born 25 September 1995) is a Chinese female volleyball player. She is part of the China women's national volleyball team. She participated in the 2015 FIVB Volleyball World Grand Prix. On club level she played for Beijing BAW in 2015.

== Clubs ==
- (China) Beijing BAW
