= 2016 FIVB World Grand Prix squads =

This article shows the roster of all participating teams at the 2016 FIVB Volleyball World Grand Prix.

== Group 1 ==
=== Belgium ===
Head coach:	Gert Vande Broek
Assistant coach:	Kris Vansnick
Doctor(s):	Leonie Geukens
	Stijn Bogaerts
Physiotherapist:	Bert Heremans

N°	Name	Date of birth	Height	Weight	Spike	Block	2016 Club
1	Angie Bland	26 April 1984 (age 42)	182	65	306	298	VB Nantes
2	Jasmien Biebauw	24 September 1990 (age 36)	180	78	295	274	Asterix Kieldrecht
3	Britt Herbots	24 September 1999 (age 27)	182	63	310	283	Asterix Kieldrecht
4	Valerie Courtois	1 November 1990 (age 36)	171	67	280	270	Dresdner SC
5	Laura Heyrman	17 May 1993 (age 33)	186	74	310	280	Lui-Jo Modena
6	Charlotte Leys (C)	18 March 1989 (age 37)	186	77	305	293	Galatasaray
7	Aziliz Divoux	3 January 1995 (age 31)	184	61	298	294	St Cloud Paris
8	Kaja Grobelna	4 January 1995 (age 31)	188	72	318	289	Allianz Stuttgart
9	Freya Aelbrecht	10 February 1990 (age 36)	186	82	308	282	Foppadretti Bergamo
10	Lise Van Hecke	1 July 1992 (age 34)	185	79	299	281	Nestlé São Paulo
11	Els Vandesteene	30 May 1987 (age 39)	186	74	308	291	VB Nantes
12	Dominika Strumilo	26 December 1996 (age 29)	187	63	311	292	Asterix Kieldrecht
13	Marlies Janssens	4 June 1997 (age 29)	193	79	312	299	VC Oudegem
14	Helene Rousseaux	25 September 1991 (age 35)	188	72	322	300	Busto Arsizio
15	Nathalie Lemmens	12 March 1995 (age 31)	192	85	311	288	Asterix Kieldrecht
16	Celine Van Gestel	7 November 1997 (age 28)	183	70	310	280	Asterix Kieldrecht
17	Ilka Van de Vyver	26 January 1993 (age 33)	170	79	296	273	Calcit Ljubljana
18	Britt Ruysschaert	27 May 1994 (age 32)	174	60	302	281	Asterix Kieldrecht
19	Amber De Tant	22 March 1998 (age 28)	177	66	303	280	Asterix Kieldrecht
20	Jodie Guilliams	26 April 1997 (age 29)	180	73	305	289	VC Oudegem
21	Karolina Goliat	25 October 1996 (age 30)	190	79	308	295	Vicenza

=== Brazil ===
Head coach:	José Roberto Guimarães
Assistant coach:	Paulo do Rego Barros Junior
Doctor(s):	Júlio Cesar de Carvalho Nardelli
Physiotherapist:	Alexandre Lopes Ramos

N°	Name	Date of birth	Height	Weight	Spike	Block	2016 Club
1	Fabiana Claudino (C)	24 January 1985 (age 41)	193	76	314	293	Praia Clube
2	Juciely Cristina Silva	18 December 1980 (age 45)	184	71	312	289	Rexona-Ades
3	Dani Lins	5 January 1985 (age 41)	181	68	290	276	Molico/Nestlé
4	Ana Carolina da Silva	8 April 1991 (age 35)	183	73	290	290	Rexona-Ades
5	Adenízia da Silva	18 December 1986 (age 39)	185	63	312	290	Savino Del Bene Volley
6	Thaísa Menezes	15 May 1987 (age 39)	196	79	316	301	Eczacıbaşı VitrA
7	Naiane Rios	29 November 1994 (age 31)	179	63	276	281	Minas Tênis Clube
8	Jaqueline Carvalho	31 December 1983 (age 42)	186	70	302	286	-
9	Roberta Ratzke	28 April 1990 (age 36)	185	71	287	278	Rexona-Ades
10	Gabriela Guimarães	19 May 1994 (age 32)	176	59	295	274	Rexona-Ades
11	Tandara Caixeta	30 October 1988 (age 38)	184	87	305	297	Molico/Nestlé
12	Natália Pereira	4 April 1989 (age 37)	183	76	300	288	Fenerbahce
13	Sheilla Castro	1 July 1983 (age 43)	185	64	302	284	Vakıfbank
14	Mariana Costa	30 July 1986 (age 40)	181	73	295	283	Minas Tênis Clube
15	Monique Pavão	31 October 1986 (age 40)	178	67	294	285	Rexona-Ades
16	Fernanda Garay	10 May 1986 (age 40)	179	74	308	288	Dynamo Moscow
17	Fabíola de Souza	3 February 1983 (age 43)	184	70	300	285	Volero Zurich
18	Camila Brait	28 October 1988 (age 38)	170	58	271	256	Molico/Nestlé
19	Léia Silva	3 January 1985 (age 41)	168	60	268	254	Minas Tênis Clube

=== China ===
Head coach:	Lang Ping
Assistant coach:	Yawen Lai
Doctor(s):	Yongji Wei
	Kai Wang
Physiotherapist:	Daniel Mar Chong

N°	Name	Date of birth	Height	Weight	Spike	Block	2016 Club
1	Yuan Xinyue	21 December 1996 (age 29)	199	78	317	311	Bayi Army
2	Zhu Ting	29 November 1994 (age 31)	195	78	327	300	Vakıfbank
3	Yang Fangxu	6 October 1994 (age 32)	190	71	308	300	Shandong
4	Liu Xiaotong	16 February 1990 (age 36)	188	70	312	300	Beijing
5	Shen Jingsi	3 May 1989 (age 37)	186	75	305	294	Bayi Army
6	Yang Junjing	15 May 1989 (age 37)	190	70	308	300	Bayi Army
7	Wei Qiuyue	26 September 1988 (age 38)	182	65	305	300	Tianjin
8	Zeng Chunlei (C)	3 November 1989 (age 37)	187	67	315	315	Beijing
9	Zhang Changning	6 November 1995 (age 30)	193	80	315	303	Jiangsu
10	Yao Di	15 August 1992 (age 34)	182	65	306	298	Tianjin
11	Xu Yunli	2 August 1987 (age 39)	195	75	325	306	Fujian
12	Hui Ruoqi	4 March 1991 (age 35)	192	78	315	305	Jiangsu
13	Zhang Xiaoya	4 October 1992 (age 34)	189	60	310	300	Sichuan
14	Gong Xiangyu	21 April 1997 (age 29)	186	72	313	302	Jiangsu
15	Lin Li	5 July 1992 (age 34)	171	65	294	294	Fujian
16	Ding Xia	13 January 1990 (age 36)	180	61	305	300	Liaoning
17	Yan Ni	2 March 1987 (age 39)	192	74	317	306	Liaoning
18	Wang Mengjie	14 November 1995 (age 30)	172	65	289	280	Shandong
19	Liu Yanhan	19 January 1993 (age 33)	188	75	315	305	Bayi Army
21	Wang Ning	14 May 1994 (age 32)	189	60	312	303	Tianjin
22	Chen Zhan	11 October 1990 (age 36)	180	65	300	295	Jiangsu ECE Volleyball

=== Germany ===
Head coach:	Luciano Pedullà
Assistant coach:
Doctor(s):
Physiotherapist:

N°	Name	Date of birth	Height	Weight	Spike	Block	2016 Club
1	Lenka Dürr	10 December 1990 (age 35)	171	59	280	270	Impel Wroclaw
2	Mareike Hindriksen	14 November 1987 (age 38)	182	62	295	270	Dresdner SC
3	Denise Hanke	31 August 1989 (age 37)	179	58	284	272	Schweriner SC
4	Sophie Dreblow	9 July 1998 (age 28)	167	65	270	260	SC Potsdam
5	Jana Franziska Poll	7 May 1988 (age 38)	185	69	310	290	VT Aurubis Hamburg
6	Saskia Hippe	16 January 1991 (age 35)	185	67	315	292	SC Potsdam
7	Jennifer Pettke	29 May 1989 (age 37)	187	71	302	290	VC Wiesbaden
8	Berit Kauffeldt	8 July 1990 (age 36)	190	75	311	294	Lokomotiv Baku
9	Kimberly Drewniok	11 August 1997 (age 29)	188	73	311	298	VC Olympia Berlin
10	Lena Stigrot	20 December 1994 (age 31)	184	68	303	295	Rote Raben Vilsbiburg
11	Louisa Lippmann	23 September 1994 (age 32)	191	78	319	312	Dresdner SC
12	Hanna Orthmann	3 October 1998 (age 28)	185	69	302	291	USC Münster
13	Lisa Izquierdo	29 August 1994 (age 32)	178	78	309	294	Dresdner SC
14	Marie Schölzel	1 August 1997 (age 29)	188	66	307	299	Schweriner SC
15	Lena Möllers	6 January 1990 (age 36)	188	74	312	297	Béziers Volley
16	Katharina Schwabe	29 April 1993 (age 33)	179	74	297	287	Dresdner SC
17	Anna Pogany	21 July 1994 (age 32)	168	70	280	270	Köpenicker SC
18	Wiebke Silge	16 July 1996 (age 30)	190	75	302	291	SC Potsdam
19	Annegret Hölzig	29 May 1997 (age 29)	186	70	308	296	SC Potsdam
20	Leonie Schwertmann	12 January 1994 (age 32)	190	80	300	290	USC Münster
21	Denise Imoudu	14 December 1995 (age 30)	180	67	290	280	VT Aurubis Hamburg

=== Italy ===
Head coach:	Marco Bonitta
Assistant coach:	Fabio Soli
Doctor(s):	Roberto Vannicelli
Physiotherapist:	Daniele Dailianis

N°	Name	Date of birth	Height	Weight	Spike	Block	2016 Club
1	Serena Ortolani	7 January 1987 (age 39)	187	63	308	288	Pomì Casalmaggiore
2	Ofelia Malinov	29 February 1996 (age 30)	183	70	301	282	Brunopremi.Com Bassano
3	Noemi Signorile	15 February 1990 (age 36)	182	70	294	290	Igor Volley Novara
4	Alessia Orro	18 July 1998 (age 28)	183	74	276	260	Club Italia
5	Sara Loda	22 August 1990 (age 36)	178	75	308	287	Foppapedretti Bergamo
6	Monica De Gennaro	8 January 1987 (age 39)	174	67	292	270	Imoco Conegliano
7	Martina Guiggi	1 May 1984 (age 42)	187	80	317	290	Guandong Evergrande
8	Alessia Gennari (C)	3 November 1991 (age 35)	184	68	302	284	Duck Farm Chieri Torino
9	Nadia Centoni	19 June 1981 (age 45)	182	63	307	291	Galatasaray
10	Ilaria Spirito	20 February 1994 (age 32)	174	56	250	243	Club Italia
11	Cristina Chirichella	10 February 1994 (age 32)	195	73	320	251	Igor Volley Novara
12	Francesca Piccinini	10 January 1979 (age 47)	184	71	310	238	Pomì Casalmaggiore
13	Carlotta Cambi	28 May 1996 (age 30)	177	66	302	292	Bakery Piacenza
14	Anastasia Guerra	15 October 1996 (age 30)	187	80	300	286	Club Italia
15	Antonella Del Core	5 November 1980 (age 46)	180	75	302	278	Dynamo Kazan
16	Miriam Sylla	8 January 1995 (age 31)	184	80	320	240	Foppapedretti Bergamo
17	Valentina Diouf	10 January 1993 (age 33)	202	94	320	303	Busto Arsizio
18	Paola Egonu	18 December 1998 (age 27)	189	70	330	315	Club Italia
19	Immacolata Sirressi	19 May 1990 (age 36)	175	62	290	220	Pomì Casalmaggiore
20	Anna Danesi	20 April 1996 (age 30)	193	75	301	284	Club Italia
21	Laura Melandri	31 January 1995 (age 31)	184	60	305	236	Bakery Piacenza

=== Japan ===
Head coach:	Masayoshi Manabe
Assistant coach:	Gen Kawakita
Doctor(s):	Daisuke Araki
Physiotherapist:	Keiko Miyaguchi

N°	Name	Date of birth	Height	Weight	Spike	Block	2016 Club
1	Miyu Nagaoka	25 July 1991 (age 35)	179	68	310	298	Hisamitsu Springs
2	Haruka Miyashita	1 September 1994 (age 32)	177	61	298	272	Okayama Seagulls
3	Saori Kimura	19 August 1986 (age 40)	185	65	304	293	Toray Arrows
4	Riho Ōtake	23 December 1993 (age 32)	182	68	306	296	Denso Airybees
5	Arisa Satō	18 July 1989 (age 37)	164	52	275	266	Hitachi Rivale
6	Yurie Nabeya	15 December 1993 (age 32)	176	58	302	285	Denso Airybees
7	Mai Yamaguchi	3 July 1983 (age 43)	176	62	304	292	Okayama Seagulls
8	Sarina Koga	21 May 1996 (age 30)	180	66	305	290	NEC Red Rockets
9	Haruyo Shimamura	4 March 1992 (age 34)	182	79	299	290	NEC Red Rockets
10	Aki Maruyama	6 October 1990 (age 36)	159	55	255	255	Okayama Seagulls
11	Erika Araki (C)	3 August 1984 (age 42)	186	78	304	301	Ageo Medics
12	Yuki Ishii	8 May 1991 (age 35)	180	68	302	286	Hisamitsu Springs
13	Miya Sato	7 March 1990 (age 36)	175	63	284	280	Hitachi Rivale
14	Yukiko Ebata	7 November 1989 (age 36)	176	67	305	298	PFU BlueCats
15	Mami Uchiseto	25 October 1991 (age 35)	170	70	296	285	Hitachi Rivale
16	Saori Sakoda	18 December 1987 (age 38)	175	63	305	279	Toray Arrows
17	Mizuki Tanaka	28 January 1996 (age 30)	170	66	298	286	JT Marvelous
18	Kotoki Zayasu	11 January 1990 (age 36)	159	57	270	255	Hisamitsu Springs
19	Arisa Inoue	8 May 1995 (age 31)	180	67	300	289	University of Tsukuba
20	Kanami Tashiro	25 March 1991 (age 35)	173	66	283	273	Toray Arrows
21	Mai Okumura	31 October 1990 (age 36)	177	66	297	286	JT Marvelous

=== Netherlands ===
Head coach:	Giovanni Guidetti
Assistant coach:	Saskia Van Hintum
Doctor(s):	Ingrid Paul
Physiotherapist:	Rinke Van Den Brink

N°	Name	Date of birth	Height	Weight	Spike	Block	2016 Club
1	Kirsten Knip	14 September 1992 (age 34)	175	70	281	275	Rote Raben Vilsbiburg
2	Femke Stoltenborg	30 July 1991 (age 35)	189	81	303	299	Allianz MTV Stuttgart
3	Yvon Beliën	28 December 1993 (age 32)	188	73	307	303	Nordmeccanica Piacenza
4	Celeste Plak	26 October 1995 (age 31)	190	87	314	302	Foppapedretti Bergamo
5	Robin De Kruijf	5 May 1991 (age 35)	192	81	313	300	Vakıfbank
6	Maret Balkestein-Grothues (C)	16 September 1988 (age 38)	180	68	304	285	PGE Atom
7	Quinta Steenbergen	2 April 1985 (age 41)	189	75	309	300	VK Prostějov
8	Judith Pietersen	3 July 1989 (age 37)	188	73	306	296	Scandicci
9	Myrthe Schoot	29 August 1988 (age 38)	182	70	298	286	Dresdner SC
10	Lonneke Slöetjes	15 November 1990 (age 35)	191	76	322	315	Vakıfbank
11	Anne Buijs	2 December 1991 (age 34)	191	73	317	299	Vakıfbank
12	Celia Diemkoudre	30 July 1992 (age 34)	182	66	300	290	Sliedrecht Sport
14	Laura Dijkema	18 February 1990 (age 36)	184	70	293	279	Dresdner SC
16	Debby Stam-Pilon	24 July 1984 (age 42)	184	69	303	281	Le Cannet
17	Nicole Oude Luttikhuis	26 December 1997 (age 28)	191	74	298	287	Eurosped TVT
18	Britt Bongaerts	3 November 1996 (age 30)	185	68	296	284	Ladies in Black Aachen
19	Nika Daalderop	29 November 1998 (age 27)	187	67	303	289	Talent Team Papendal
20	Marlies Wagendorp	11 October 1993 (age 33)	193	90	312	308	Sliedrecht Sport
21	Juliet Lohuis	10 September 1996 (age 30)	190	77	305	295	Coolen Alterno Dames
22	Nicole Koolhaas	31 January 1991 (age 35)	198	77	310	300	Volley Franches-Montagnes
23	Tessa Polder	10 October 1997 (age 29)	189	73	297	286	Sliedrecht Sport

=== Russia ===
Head coach:	Yuri Marichev
Assistant coach:	Igor Kurnosov
Doctor(s):	Sergei Rasskazov
Physiotherapist:	Nikolai Semenychev

N°	Name	Date of birth	Height	Weight	Spike	Block	2016 Club
1	Yana Shcherban	6 September 1989 (age 37)	187	71	298	294	Dynamo Moscow
2	Ekaterina Ulanova	5 August 1986 (age 40)	172	61	298	290	Dinamo Kazan
3	Elena Ezhova	14 August 1977 (age 49)	178	69	288	282	Dinamo Kazan
4	Irina Zaryazhko	4 October 1991 (age 35)	196	78	305	290	Uralochka Ekaterinburg
5	Liubov Shashkova	4 December 1977 (age 48)	192	72	315	307	Dinamo Krasnodar
6	Daria Malygina	4 April 1994 (age 32)	202	82	317	305	Zarechie Odintzovo
7	Ekaterina Lyubushkina	2 January 1990 (age 36)	188	81	300	285	Dynamo Moscow
8	Nataliya Goncharova	1 June 1989 (age 37)	196	75	315	306	Dynamo Moscow
9	Daria Ievtoukhova	22 April 1991 (age 35)	190	71	305	296	Uralochka Ekaterinburg
10	Ekaterina Kosianenko C	2 February 1990 (age 36)	175	74	290	285	Dynamo Moscow
11	Ekaterina Gamova	17 October 1980 (age 46)	205	80	321	310	Dinamo Kazan
12	Marina Babeshina	26 June 1985 (age 41)	181	62	291	289	Uralochka Ekaterinburg
13	Evgeniya Startseva	12 February 1989 (age 37)	185	68	294	290	Dinamo Kazan
14	Irina Fetisova	7 September 1994 (age 32)	190	76	307	286	Dynamo Moscow
15	Tatiana Kosheleva	23 December 1988 (age 37)	191	72	315	305	Dinamo Krasnodar
16	Irina Voronkova	20 October 1995 (age 31)	194	84	305	290	Zarechie-Odintsovo
17	Natalia Malykh	8 December 1993 (age 32)	187	65	308	297	Dinamo Krasnodar
18	Kseniia Ilchenko	31 October 1994 (age 32)	183	64	300	286	Uralochka Ekaterinburg
19	Anna Malova	16 April 1990 (age 36)	175	59	286	290	Dynamo Moscow
20	Anastasia Shlyakhovaya	5 October 1990 (age 36)	192	69	313	307	Dinamo Krasnodar
21	Ekaterina Efimova	3 July 1993 (age 33)	192	70	305	295	Dinamo Krasnodar

=== Serbia ===
Head coach:	Zoran Terzić
Assistant coach:	Aleksandar Vladisavljev
Physiotherapist:	Sinisa Mladenovic

N°	Name	Date of birth	Height	Weight	Spike	Block	2016 Club
1	Bianka Busa	25 July 1994 (age 32)	187	74	293	282	CSM Targoviste
2	Jovana Brakocevic	5 March 1988 (age 38)	196	82	309	295	Vakıfbank
3	Sanja Malagurski	8 June 1990 (age 36)	193	74	305	295	Trabzon İdmanocağı
4	Bojana Zivkovic	29 March 1988 (age 38)	186	72	300	292	Voléro Zürich
5	Mina Popovic	16 September 1994 (age 32)	187	73	315	305	Obiettivo Vicenza
6	Tijana Malesevic	18 March 1991 (age 35)	185	78	300	286	Igor Gorgonzola Novara
7	Brizitka Molnar	28 July 1985 (age 41)	182	69	304	290	AO Panathinaikos
8	Danica Radenkovic	9 October 1992 (age 34)	185	70	300	294	Atom Trefl Sopot
9	Brankica Mihajlovic	13 April 1991 (age 35)	190	83	302	290	Fenerbahçe
10	Maja Ognjenovic (C)	6 August 1984 (age 42)	183	67	300	293	Nordmeccanica Piacenza
11	Stefana Veljkovic	9 January 1990 (age 36)	190	76	320	305	Chemik Police
12	Jelena Nikolic	13 April 1982 (age 44)	194	79	315	300	Bursa Buyuksehir
13	Ana Bjelica	3 April 1992 (age 34)	190	78	310	305	Salihli Belediyespor
14	Jovana Kocic	24 February 1998 (age 28)	190	85	290	285	Vizura Beograd
15	Jovana Stevanovic	30 June 1992 (age 34)	192	72	308	295	Pomi Casalmaggiore
16	Milena Rasic	25 October 1990 (age 36)	191	72	315	310	Vakıfbank
17	Silvija Popovic	15 March 1986 (age 40)	178	65	286	276	Voléro Zürich
18	Suzana Cebic	9 November 1984 (age 41)	167	60	279	255	CSM Targoviste
19	Tijana Bošković	8 March 1997 (age 29)	193	82	310	300	Eczacıbaşı VitrA
20	Ivana Djerisilo	8 August 1983 (age 43)	188	68	277	252	Atom Trefl Sopot
21	Jovana Vesovic	21 June 1987 (age 39)	182	68	283	268	CSV Alba

=== Thailand ===
Head coach:	Kiattipong Radchatagriengkai
Assistant coach:	Nataphon Srisamutnak
Doctor(s):	Ead Lorprayoon
Physiotherapist:	Tibparat Kaewsai

N°	Name	Date of birth	Height	Weight	Spike	Block	2016 Club
1	Wanna Buakaew	2 January 1981 (age 45)	172	54	292	277	Azerrail Baku
2	Piyanut Pannoy	10 November 1989 (age 36)	171	68	280	275	Supreme
3	Pornpun Guedpard	5 May 1993 (age 33)	170	63	270	267	Bangkok Glass
4	Thatdao Nuekjang	3 February 1994 (age 32)	183	66	305	287	Idea Khonkaen
5	Pleumjit Thinkaow (C)	9 November 1983 (age 42)	180	63	298	281	Bangkok Glass
6	Onuma Sittirak	13 June 1986 (age 40)	175	72	304	285	JT Marvelous
7	Hattaya Bamrungsuk	12 August 1993 (age 33)	178	70	290	280	Nakhon Ratchasima
8	Yupa Sanitklang	14 August 1991 (age 35)	166	60	275	260	Idea Khonkaen
9	Jarasporn Bundasak	1 March 1993 (age 33)	180	66	290	280	Bangkok Glass
10	Wilavan Apinyapong	6 June 1984 (age 42)	174	68	294	282	Supreme
11	Wanitchaya Luangtonglang	8 October 1992 (age 34)	177	60	300	275	Nakhon Ratchasima
12	Pimpichaya Kokram	16 June 1998 (age 28)	175	57	291	281	3BB Nakhonnont
13	Nootsara Tomkom	7 July 1985 (age 41)	169	57	289	278	Fenerbahce
14	Kanittha Juangjan	16 January 1998 (age 28)	173	64	288	274	Thai-Denmark Nongrua
15	Malika Kanthong	8 January 1987 (age 39)	177	63	292	278	Azeryol Baku
16	Wipawee Srithong	28 January 1999 (age 27)	173	64	288	266	Supreme
17	Kaewkalaya Kamulthala	7 August 1994 (age 32)	178	66	298	281	Idea Khonkaen
18	Ajcharaporn Kongyot	18 June 1995 (age 31)	180	66	290	284	Supreme
19	Chatchu-On Moksri	6 November 1999 (age 26)	175	63	285	275	3BB Nakhonnont
20	Soraya Phomla	6 August 1992 (age 34)	169	60	280	270	Idea Khonkaen
21	Tapaphaipun Chaisri	29 November 1989 (age 36)	168	60	295	276	Thai-Denmark Nongrua

=== Turkey ===
Head coach:	Ferhat Akbaş
Assistant coach:	Dehri Can Dehrioğlu
Doctor(s):	Melda Pelin Yargıç
Physiotherapist:	Serkan Usgu

N°	Name	Date of birth	Height	Weight	Spike	Block	2016 Club
1	Hatice Gizem Örge	26 April 1993 (age 33)	170	59	270	260	Vakıfbank
2	Merve Dalbeler	27 June 1987 (age 39)	182	73	284	277	Fenerbahçe Grundig
3	Gizem Karadayı	14 January 1987 (age 39)	178	60	290	285	Fenerbahçe Grundig
4	Tutku Burcu Yüzgenç	15 January 1999 (age 27)	188	61	298	295	Halkbank
5	Kübra Akman	13 October 1994 (age 32)	197	89	314	305	Vakıfbank
6	Polen Uslupehlivan	27 August 1990 (age 36)	193	65	305	298	Fenerbahçe Grundig
7	Hande Baladın	1 September 1997 (age 29)	189	71	295	293	Eczacıbaşı VitrA
8	Meliha İsmailoğlu	17 September 1993 (age 33)	188	70	304	301	Fenerbahçe Grundig
9	Aslı Kalaç	13 December 1995 (age 30)	183	73	300	290	Galatasaray Daikin
10	Güldeniz Önal (C)	25 March 1986 (age 40)	183	75	302	293	Galatasaray Daikin
11	Naz Aydemir Akyol	14 August 1990 (age 36)	186	68	300	290	Vakıfbank
12	Melis Durul	21 October 1993 (age 33)	178	53	280	275	Sarıyer
14	Eda Erdem Dündar	22 June 1987 (age 39)	188	73	311	305	Fenerbahçe Grundig
15	Arelya Karasoy	14 December 1996 (age 29)	181	73	287	280	Sarıyer
16	Ceylan Arısan	1 January 1994 (age 32)	193	79	306	297	Beşiktaş
17	Nursevil Aydınlar	28 November 1995 (age 30)	187	64	293	285	Galatasaray Daikin
18	Zehra Güneş	7 July 1999 (age 27)	194	82	309	255	Vakıfbank
19	Ezgi Dilik	12 June 1995 (age 31)	170	60	300	310	Fenerbahçe Grundig
20	Gözde Yılmaz	9 September 1991 (age 35)	195	78	306	299	Busto Arsizio
21	Özge Nur Yurtdagülen	6 August 1993 (age 33)	190	67	307	298	Sarıyer
25	Fatma Yıldırım	3 January 1990 (age 36)	179	65	288	280	Halkbank

=== United States ===
Head coach:	Karch Kiraly
Assistant coach:	Jamie Morrison
Doctor(s):	Eugene Yim
Physiotherapist:	Jill Wosmek

No.	Name	Date of birth	Height	Weight	Spike	Block	2016 Club
	Karsta Lowe	2 February 1993 (aged 23)	193	75	315	305	Busto Arsizio
1	Alisha Glass	5 April 1988 (aged 28)	184	72	305	300	Imoco Volley
2	Kayla Banwarth	21 January 1989 (aged 27)	178	75	295	283	USA Volleyball Team
3	Courtney Thompson	4 November 1984 (aged 31)	170	66	276	263	Rio de Janeiro Volei Clube
4	Lauren Paolini	22 August 1987 (aged 28)	193	73	317	299	Hitachi Rivale
5	Rachael Adams	3 June 1990 (aged 26)	188	81	318	307	Imoco Volley
6	Carli Lloyd	6 August 1989 (aged 26)	180	75	313	295	Pomì Casalmaggiore
7	Cassidy Lichtman	25 May 1989 (aged 27)	185	68	299	279	Sichuan
8	Lauren Gibbemeyer	8 September 1988 (aged 27)	187	71	307	293	Pomì Casalmaggiore
9	Kristin Lynn Hildebrand	30 June 1985 (aged 30)	185	68	300	284	Impel Wrocław
10	Jordan Larson-Burbach	16 October 1986 (aged 29)	188	75	302	295	Eczacıbaşı VitrA
11	Megan Easy	15 October 1988 (aged 27)	191	80	320	297	Imoco Volley
12	Kelly Murphy	20 October 1989 (aged 26)	188	79	315	307	Ageo Medics
13	Christa Harmotto Dietzen (C)	12 October 1986 (aged 29)	188	79	322	300	Fenerbahçe
14	Nicole Fawcett	16 December 1986 (aged 29)	191	82	310	291	AGIL Volley
15	Kimberly Hill	30 November 1989 (aged 26)	193	72	320	310	Vakıfbank
16	Foluke Akinradewo	5 October 1987 (aged 28)	191	79	331	300	Volero Zurich
17	Natalie Hagglund	1 July 1992 (aged 23)	178	68	292	290	Volero Zurich
18	Molly Kreklow	17 February 1992 (aged 24)	181	64	291	281	Eczacıbaşı VitrA
20	Alexis Crimes	12 June 1986 (aged 29)	191	68	325	300	Sarıyer
23	Kelsey Robinson	25 June 1992 (aged 23)	188	75	306	300	Imoco Volley
24	Krista Vansant	31 March 1993 (aged 23)	188	75	310	300	Volero Zurich

== Group 2 ==
=== Argentina ===
Head coach:	Guillermo Orduna
Assistant coach:	Guillermo Caceres
Doctor(s):	Arnoldo Albero
Physiotherapist:	Maximo Fiorucci

N°	Name	Date of birth	Height	Weight	Spike	Block	2016 Club
1	Viviana Dominko	3 October 1982 (age 44)	172	68	289	270	Banfield
2	Tanya Acosta	11 March 1991 (age 35)	182	70	287	280	GELP
3	Paula Yamila Nizetich	27 January 1989 (age 37)	181	74	305	295	Nilüfer
4	Sabrina Segui	12 May 1978 (age 48)	180	68	298	285	Palma Volley
5	Lucia Fresco	14 May 1991 (age 35)	195	92	304	290	Robur Tiboni Urbino
6	Elina Rodriguez	11 February 1997 (age 29)	189	72	300	284	San Lorenzo
7	Natalia Aispurua	20 December 1991 (age 34)	192	78	310	293	Boca Juniors
8	Sol Piccolo	11 September 1996 (age 30)	184	74	294	282	Velez Sarsfield
9	Clarisa Sagardia	29 June 1989 (age 37)	174	67	290	280	Boca Juniors
10	Emilce Sosa	11 September 1987 (age 39)	177	72	305	295	Rio Do Soul
11	Julieta Constanza Lazcano	25 July 1989 (age 37)	190	74	312	293	Istres
12	Tatiana Soledad Rizzo	30 December 1986 (age 39)	178	64	280	268	Boca Juniors
13	Leticia Boscacci	8 November 1985 (age 40)	186	70	302	284	VC Kanti
14	Josefina Fernandez	17 August 1991 (age 35)	175	72	294	284	Franches-Montagnes
15	Antonela Fortuna	10 May 1995 (age 31)	175	61	285	275	Central San Carlos
16	Florencia Busquets	27 June 1989 (age 37)	192	68	305	290	Franches-Montagnes
17	Helena Vidal	6 January 1989 (age 37)	186	71
18	Yael Castiglione	27 September 1985 (age 41)	184	75	295	281	Rio Do Soul
19	Morena Martinez Franchi	19 February 1993 (age 33)	164	62	285	264	Velez Sarsfield
20	Carla Castiglione	7 March 1989 (age 37)	190	74	301	289	San Lorenzo
21	Candelaria Herrera	28 January 1999 (age 27)	182	71	290	275	UNIVERSIDAD DE SAN JUAN

=== Bulgaria ===
Head coach:	Ivan Dimitrov
Assistant coach:	Antonina Zetova
Doctor(s):	Anna Nikolova
Physiotherapist:	Maxim Mihaylov

N°	Name	Date of birth	Height	Weight	Spike	Block	2016 Club
1	Gergana Dimitrova	28 February 1996 (age 30)	184	71	305	288	RC Cannes
2	Desislava Nikolova	21 December 1991 (age 34)	184	70	290	285	Seramiksan
3	Nasya Dimitrova	6 November 1992 (age 33)	190	70	305	290	Levski Volley
4	Lora Kitipova	19 May 1991 (age 35)	184	66	290	283	Obiettivo Risarcimento
5	Miroslava Paskova	16 February 1996 (age 30)	180	67	299	280	Levski Volley
6	Tsvetelina Zarkova	18 December 1986 (age 39)	187	69	298	289	Dinamo București
7	Gabriela Tsvetanova	11 April 1991 (age 35)	185	72	295	290	Olympiacos
8	Eva Yaneva	31 July 1985 (age 41)	186	75	298	290	İller Bankası
9	Petya Barakova	18 June 1994 (age 32)	180	76	283	271	Volero Zurich
10	Viktoriya Grigorova	25 July 1990 (age 36)	189	68	296	290	Maritza
11	Mira Todorova	12 April 1994 (age 32)	187	70	312	300	Le Cannet-Rocheville
12	Mariya Dancheva	4 December 1995 (age 30)	195	73	314	302	Maritza
13	Mariya Filipova	10 September 1982 (age 44)	178	68	295	275	Telekom Baku
14	Emiliya Nikolova	26 December 1991 (age 34)	185	59	302	287	Savino Del Bene
15	Kremena Kamenova	21 May 1988 (age 38)	185	64	304	299	VC Dorozhnik
16	Elitsa Vasileva (C)	13 May 1990 (age 36)	194	73	302	290	Dynamo Kazan
17	Yuliya Stoyanova	22 July 1985 (age 41)	185	64	305	298	Nancy
18	Silvana Chausheva	19 May 1995 (age 31)	188	75	305	290	Maritza
19	Veronika Bezhandolska	24 August 1992 (age 34)	190	72	300	281	Levski Volley
20	Yoanna Atanasova	29 January 1998 (age 28)	189	70	296	285	Rakovski
21	Veselina Grigorova	6 September 1995 (age 31)	194	80	303	292	Kazanlak Volley

=== Canada ===
Head coach:	Arnd Ludwig
Assistant coach:	Ryan Ratushniak
Physiotherapist:	Byron Bahniuk

N°	Name	Date of birth	Height	Weight	Spike	Block	2016 Club
1	Jessica Niles	14 July 1993 (age 33)	176	61	287	278	University of Alberta
2	Danielle Brisebois	12 August 1994 (age 32)	180	77	311	301	University of British Columbia
3	Marie-Sophie Nadeau	10 October 1989 (age 37)	184	84	307	292	Team Canada
4	Michaela Reesor	2 March 1993 (age 33)	180	66	302	279	University of Alabama
5	Danielle Smith	29 April 1990 (age 36)	178	68	291	277	Sliedrecht Sport
6	Kim Robitaille	16 October 1991 (age 35)	179	59	292	279	University of Sherbrooke
7	Sophie Carpentier	7 February 1994 (age 32)	185	73	297	282	Trinity Western University
8	Alicia Ogoms	2 April 1994 (age 32)	194	82	315	305	Univ of Southern California
9	Tabitha Love	11 September 1991 (age 35)	196	85	323	307	Schweriner SC
10	Marisa Field	10 July 1987 (age 39)	189	71	312	297	EVS
11	Alison Mckay	28 August 1995 (age 31)	166	63	286	276	Simon Fraser University
12	Jennifer Cross	4 July 1992 (age 34)	195	81	315	296	Dresdner SC
13	Lucille Charuk (C)	13 August 1989 (age 37)	188	88	315	296	Rote Raben Vilsbiburg
14	Elizabeth Wendel	15 December 1993 (age 32)	185	81	310	300	Trinity Western University
15	Katia Forcier	16 October 1991 (age 35)	178	68	296	280	University of Montreal
16	Shainah Joseph	15 May 1995 (age 31)	183	79	328	318	University of Florida
17	Kristen Moncks	31 July 1992 (age 34)	173	66	290	274	Team Canada
18	Shanice Marcelle	28 May 1990 (age 36)	180	67	306	286	Volleyball Nantes
19	Marie-Alex Bélanger	13 April 1993 (age 33)	186	75	315	295	Université de Montréal
20	Alicia Perrin	1 June 1992 (age 34)	188	84	305	286	Pannaxiakos
22	Megan Cyr	1 June 1990 (age 36)	182	75	297	282	Viteos NUC

=== Czech Republic ===
Head coach:	Alexander Waibel
Assistant coach:	Zdenek Pommer
Doctor(s):	Zdenek Cech
Physiotherapist:	Zdenek Zitka

N°	Name	Date of birth	Height	Weight	Spike	Block	2016 Club
1	Andrea Kossanyiova	6 August 1993 (age 33)	186	72	310	300	Impel Wrocław
2	Eva Hodanova	18 December 1993 (age 32)	189	75	306	298	PVK Olymp Praha
3	Veronika Trnkova	13 October 1995 (age 31)	188	88	314	300	VfB 91 Suhl e.V.
4	Klara Vyklicka	3 June 1993 (age 33)	184	73	305	295	PVK Olymp Praha
5	Barbora Gambova	7 March 1992 (age 34)	177	77	302	288	VK Prostejov
6	Lucie Smutna	14 April 1991 (age 35)	180	75	307	285	Halkbank
7	Iva Nachmilnerova	20 September 1988 (age 38)	191	83	310	299	TJ Ostrava
8	Barbora Purchartova	9 May 1992 (age 34)	189	81	309	300	NawaRo Straubing
9	Eva Rutarova	14 September 1989 (age 37)	198	89	317	305	Köpenicker SC
10	Helena Kojdová	12 May 1991 (age 35)	180	65	300	292	TJ Ostrava
11	Veronika Dostalova	7 April 1992 (age 34)	170	66	278	269	PVK Olymp Praha
12	Michaela Mlejnkova	26 July 1996 (age 30)	185	75	305	298	MTV Stuttgart
13	Karolína Bednárová	20 July 1986 (age 40)	183	67	304	285	Irmato VC Weert
14	Tereza Rossi (C)	3 December 1982 (age 43)	191	81	310	285	Pomi Casalmaggiore
15	Ivona Svobodnikova	1 April 1991 (age 35)	190	77	300	290	Post-Telekom-Sportverein Aache
17	Monika Smidova	13 January 1992 (age 34)	183	63	301	287	American University
18	Pavla Vincourova	12 November 1992 (age 33)	180	68	297	290	Budowlani Lodz
19	Petra Kojdova	23 September 1993 (age 33)	183	68	304	298	TJ Ostrava
20	Marie Toufarova	19 June 1992 (age 34)	184	70	304	294	TJ Ostrava
21	Katerina Valkova	6 February 1996 (age 30)	177	59	288	275	TJ Ostrava
22	Sona Mikyskova	2 May 1989 (age 37)	189	79	305	300	Pays D´aix Venelles

=== Dominican Republic ===
Head coach:	Marcos Kwiek
Assistant coach:	Wagner Pacheco
Physiotherapist:	Cesar Villalona

N°	Name	Date of birth	Height	Weight	Spike	Block	2016 Club
1	Annerys Vargas	7 August 1981 (age 45)	196	70	327	320	Seleccion Nacional
2	Winifer Fernández	6 January 1995 (age 31)	169	62	270	265	Cien Fuego
3	Lisvel Elisa Eve Mejia	10 September 1991 (age 35)	194	70	325	315	Mirador
4	Marianne Fersola Norberto	16 January 1992 (age 34)	191	60	315	310	Mirador
5	Brenda Castillo	5 June 1992 (age 34)	167	55	245	230	San Cristobal
6	Camil Domínguez	7 December 1991 (age 34)	176	75	232	275	Mirador
7	Niverka Dharlenis Marte Frica	19 October 1990 (age 36)	178	71	295	283	Deportivo Nacional
8	Candida Estefany Arias Perez	11 March 1992 (age 34)	194	68	320	315	San Cristobal
9	Angelica Maria Hinojosa Diaz	10 January 1997 (age 29)	186	72	305	279	Cien Fuego
10	Yokaty Perez Flores	6 August 1998 (age 28)	178	79	291	257	Los Cachorros
11	Cindy Rondón	12 November 1987 (age 38)	186	61	320	315	Seleccion Nacional
12	Gaila Ceneida Gonzalez Lopez	25 June 1997 (age 29)	188	73	304	276	Mirador
13	Erasma Moreno Martinez	25 November 1991 (age 34)	183	75	289	304	Monte Plata
14	Prisilla Rivera Brens	29 December 1984 (age 41)	183	67	309	305	San Pedro
15	Larysmer Martinez Caro	18 October 1996 (age 30)	174	68	288	258	Deportivo Nacional
16	Yonkaira Paola Peña Isabel	10 May 1993 (age 33)	190	70	320	310	Mirador
17	Gina Altagracia Mambru Casilla	21 January 1986 (age 40)	182	65	330	315	Los Cachorros
18	Bethania De La Cruz De Peña	13 May 1987 (age 39)	188	70	330	320	Deportivo Nacional
19	Ana Yorkira Binet Stephens	9 February 1992 (age 34)	174	58	280	260	Samana
20	Brayelin Elizabeth Martinez	11 September 1996 (age 30)	201	83	330	320	Deportivo Nacional
21	Jineiry Martinez	3 December 1997 (age 28)	190	68	305	280	Mirador

=== Kenya ===
Head coach:	David Lung'aho
Assistant coach:	Japheth Munala
Physiotherapist:	Charles Maina

N°	Name	Date of birth	Height	Weight	Spike	Block	2016 Club
1	Jane Wairimu	24 March 1985 (age 41)	174	60	300	285	Kenya Prisons
2	Everlyne Makuto	25 August 1990 (age 36)	181	64	328	308	Kenya Prisons
3	Violet Makuto	12 March 1992 (age 34)	167	65	298	290	Kenya Pipelines
4	Esther Wangeci	22 November 1990 (age 35)	180	73	302	296	Kenya Pipelines
5	Anne Lowem	1 August 1996 (age 30)
6	Chemtai Ndiema	3 June 1991 (age 35)	183	75	299	271	Nairobi Water
7	Jannet Wanja	24 February 1984 (age 42)	175	59	299	287	Kenya Pipelines
8	Triza Atuka	14 April 1992 (age 34)	188	65	298	293	Kenya Pipelines
9	Elizabeth Wanyama	27 May 1987 (age 39)	174	68	270	260	Kenya Prisons
10	Noel Murambi	29 January 1989 (age 37)	178	68	302	297	Kenya Pipelines
12	Lydia Maiyo	3 November 1988 (age 38)	185	75	325	315	Kenya Prisons
14	Mercy Moim (C)	1 January 1989 (age 37)	183	72	320	308	Kenya Prisons
15	Brackcides Khadambi	14 May 1984 (age 42)	180	70	310	306	Kenya Prisons
16	Agripina Kundu	24 April 1993 (age 33)	165	66	294	288	Kenya Pipelines
17	Gaudencia Makokha	15 November 1992 (age 33)	187	68	280	270	Kenya Pipelines
18	Monica Biama	24 March 1988 (age 38)	176	59	300	270	Kenya Pipelines
19	Edith Mukuvilani	20 July 1994 (age 32)	184	73	305	298	Kenya Prisons
20	Joan Kibor	30 September 1989 (age 37)	181	68	303	299	Kenya Prisons

=== Poland ===
Head coach:	Jacek Nawrocki
Assistant coach:	Waldemar Kawka
Doctor(s):	Krzysztof Zajac
Physiotherapist:	Lukasz Witczak

N°	Name	Date of birth	Height	Weight	Spike	Block	2016 Club
1	Agnieszka Kakolewska	17 October 1994 (age 32)	197	75	309	295	Impel Wrocław
2	Gabriela Polanska	27 November 1988 (age 37)	202	81	308	299	Budowlani Łódź
3	Kamila Ganszczyk	2 December 1991 (age 34)	191	76	310	301	MKS SA
4	Agata Sawicka	17 January 1985 (age 41)	180	64	295	277	Impel Wrocław
5	Ewelina Tobiasz	6 February 1994 (age 32)	177	67	293	276	Budowlani Łódź
6	Anna Grejman	8 June 1993 (age 33)	183	67	302	283	MKS Muszyna
7	Berenika Tomsia	18 March 1988 (age 38)	188	72	310	302	Metalleghe Sanitars
8	Katarzyna Zaroslinska	3 February 1987 (age 39)	187	72	312	290	Atom Trefl
9	Aleksandra Krzos	23 June 1989 (age 37)	181	71	275	260	MKS Muszyna
10	Zuzanna Efimienko	8 August 1989 (age 37)	197	72	318	303	Atom Trefl
11	Tamara Kaliszuk	20 March 1990 (age 36)	181	73	296	281	MKS SA
12	Julia Twardowska	4 May 1995 (age 31)	185	66	297	283	Budowlani Łódź
13	Agata Durajczyk	12 August 1989 (age 37)	170	63	280	275	Atom Trefl
14	Joanna Wolosz (C)	7 April 1990 (age 36)	181	65	303	281	Chemik
15	Martyna Grajber	28 March 1995 (age 31)	180	67	293	276	Budowlani Łódź
16	Magdalena Hawryla	1 January 1989 (age 37)	190	72	315	305	KS DevelopRes
17	Malwina Smarzek	3 June 1996 (age 30)	191	80	318	292	Legionovia SA
18	Emilia Mucha	7 December 1993 (age 32)	186	78	300	283	BKS SA
19	Alicja Grabka	9 May 1998 (age 28)	178	62	290	280	Legionovia SA
20	Marlena Plesnierowicz	9 January 1992 (age 34)	176	61	295	281	KS Palac
21	Agata Skiba	24 February 1991 (age 35)	184	74	303	290	KS DevelopRes

=== Puerto Rico ===
Head coach:	Juan Carlos Nunez
Assistant coach:	Xiomara Molero
Doctor(s):	Juan F. Garcia Troncoso
Physiotherapist:	Victor Correa

N°	Name	Date of birth	Height	Weight	Spike	Block	2016 Club
1	Debora Seilhamer	4 October 1985 (age 41)	166	61	245	240	Lancheras de Cataño
2	Shara Venegas	18 September 1992 (age 34)	173	68	280	272	Criollas de Caguas
3	Vilmarie Mojica	13 August 1985 (age 41)	180	63	295	288	Valencianas de Juncos
4	Ana Sofia Jusino	5 January 1994 (age 32)	189	65	310	294	National Team
5	Odemaris Diaz	15 March 1982 (age 44)	188	78	289	283	Gigantes de Carolina
6	Yarimar Rosa (C)	20 June 1988 (age 38)	178	62	295	285	Valencianas de Juncos
7	Stephanie Enright	15 December 1990 (age 35)	179	56	300	292	Criollas de Caguas
8	Xaimara Colon	11 September 1988 (age 38)	176	62	255	246	Valencianas de Juncos
9	Aurea Cruz	10 January 1982 (age 44)	180	63	310	290	Carolina
10	Diana Reyes	29 April 1993 (age 33)	191	80	303	299	Criollas de Caguas
11	Karina Ocasio	1 August 1985 (age 41)	192	76	298	288	Criollas de Caguas
12	Jennifer Nogueras	1 August 1991 (age 35)	185	88	299	292	Criollas de Caguas
13	Shirley Ferrer	23 June 1991 (age 35)	180	63	290	293	Lancheras de Cataño
14	Natalia Valentin	12 September 1989 (age 37)	170	61	244	240	Leonas de Ponce
15	Daly Santana	19 February 1995 (age 31)	185	65	300	274	Capitalinas de San Juan
16	Alexandra Oquendo	3 February 1984 (age 42)	189	75	297	284	Lancheras de Cataño
17	Noami Santos	29 November 1993 (age 32)	192	63	309	300	National Team
18	Lynda Morales	20 May 1988 (age 38)	188	74	302	296	Criollas de Caguas
19	Paulina Prieto	25 January 1994 (age 32)	185	72	262	254	National Team
20	Raymariely Santos	13 April 1992 (age 34)	183	72	290	288	Leonas de Ponce
21	Pilar Marie Victoria	11 October 1995 (age 31)	182	53	301	268	National Team

== Group 3 ==
=== Algeria ===
Head coach:	Belacel Mohamed Amine
Assistant coach:	Mouzaia Madjid
Doctor(s):	Abdelli Youcef
Physiotherapist:	Harbouche Fatma Zohra

N°	Name	Date of birth	Height	Weight	Spike	Block	2016 Club
1	Chahla Benmokhtar	30 December 1997 (age 28)	179	53	282	270	SEDDOUK.VB
2	Jasmin Belguendouz	11 June 1997 (age 29)	175	65	276	270	MTV Stuttgart
3	Salima Hammouche	17 January 1984 (age 42)	158	54	270	265	G.S.Petroliers
4	Hanan Abbaz	10 May 1994 (age 32)	170	65	275	260	Asnières Volley 92
5	Fahima Brahmi	2 March 1993 (age 33)	180	68	302	290	CRR TOUDJA
6	Zahra Guimour	22 November 1996 (age 29)	172	58	272	250	G.S. Chlef
7	Chettout Kahina	20 May 1992 (age 34)	168	60	260	255	G.S.Petroliers
8	Dallal Merwa Achour	3 November 1994 (age 32)	176	60	275	262	G.S. Chlef
9	Chanez Ayadi	8 February 1994 (age 32)	173	59	271	254	NC Béjaïa
10	Safia Imadali	15 June 1997 (age 29)	178	60	272	260	OEFly
11	Yasmine Abderrahim	16 April 1999 (age 27)	175	56	270	265	ASW Béjaïa
12	Safia Boukhima (C)	10 January 1991 (age 35)	176	64	294	284	G.S.Petroliers
13	Silya Magnana	16 March 1991 (age 35)	181	68	274	261	MB Béjaïa
14	Melissa Kasri	13 February 1998 (age 28)	182	59	280	270	NC Béjaïa
15	Aicha Mezemate	6 June 1991 (age 35)	187	75	300	285	G.S.Petroliers
16	Wissem Dali	1 September 1995 (age 31)	174	58	266	260	MB Béjaïa
17	Lydia Oulmou	2 February 1986 (age 40)	181	59	291	284	PAYS D'AIX VENELLES
18	Kahina Messaoudene	15 July 1992 (age 34)	183	56	299	290	ASW Béjaïa
19	Kahina Arbouche	4 September 1993 (age 33)	175	60	295	280	ASW Béjaïa
20	Yasmine Oudni	2 August 1989 (age 37)	181	63	281	280	G.S.Petroliers
21	Amira Sadi	10 September 1994 (age 32)	187	70	280	273	RUBA

=== Australia ===
Head coach:	Shannon Winzer
Assistant coach:	Lauren Bertolacci
Physiotherapist:	Henry Tram

N°	Name	Date of birth	Height	Weight	Spike	Block	2016 Club
1	Rhiannon Watt	8 December 1987 (age 38)	186	73	301	290	University Blues
2	Kylee White	2 April 1998 (age 28)	178	69	285	262	Queensland Pirates
3	Eliza Smith	10 November 1992 (age 33)	191	76	302	297	University Blues
4	Sophie Godfrey	2 December 1987 (age 38)	186	73	295	284	WA Pearls
5	Rhiannon Rosalynd Tooker	17 January 1990 (age 36)	195	83	305	294	Liiga Ploki
6	Alice De Innocentiis	4 June 1984 (age 42)	167	66	278	247	UTS Sydney
7	Shae Sloane (C)	1 May 1992 (age 34)	174	61	284	270	University Blues
8	Hannah Martin	15 September 1990 (age 36)	183	80	294	289	University Blues
9	Jamie-Lee Morrow	16 November 1992 (age 33)	177	77	290	260	University Blues
10	Buddhima Sharmaine Fernando	2 October 1995 (age 31)	155	54	270	244	UTS Sydney
11	Rebecca Walter	10 August 1987 (age 39)	173	75	288	257	University Blues
12	Caitlin Bettenay	3 September 1998 (age 28)	180	74	301	270	Queensland Pirates
13	Beth Carey	28 September 1990 (age 36)	190	78	300	290	Adelaide Storm
14	Rebecca Reeve	23 May 1994 (age 32)	181	69	294	283	Adelaide Storm
15	Danusia Weronika Sipa Borgeaud	1 March 1997 (age 29)	173	66	288	280	Canberra Heat
16	Elizabeth Borger	11 January 1995 (age 31)	172	64	285	270	UTS Sydney
17	Katrina Janssen	12 May 1995 (age 31)	190	80	300	285	University Blues
18	Jennifer Aliss Sadler	18 March 1993 (age 33)	185	69	302	291	WA Pearls
20	Jessica Russell-Croucher	4 February 1991 (age 35)	174	75	292	281	Queensland Pirates
21	Sophie Paine	1 September 1992 (age 34)	176	65	287	276	University Blues
22	Eliza Hynes	29 January 1992 (age 34)	183	70	305	292	University Blues

=== Colombia ===
Head coach:	Eduardo Guillaume
Assistant coach:	Horacio Bastit
Physiotherapist:	Lina Trejos

N°	Name	Date of birth	Height	Weight	Spike	Block	2016 Club
1	Paola Ampudia	5 August 1988 (age 38)	183	72	310	2900	Liga Vallecaucana
2	Yeisy Soto	17 April 1996 (age 30)	186	67	290	299	LIGA BOLIVARENSE
3	Kenny Moreno	6 January 1979 (age 47)	185	68	300	291
4	Dayana Segovia	24 March 1996 (age 30)	182	58	298	281	Liga Bolivarense
5	Angie Velasquez	13 June 2000 (age 26)	170	55	270	280	CUNDINAMARCA
6	Lorena Zuleta Garcia	16 January 1981 (age 45)	192	77	315	310	Astana Vc
7	Madelaynne Montaño	6 January 1983 (age 43)	186	70	335	310	Liga Vallecaucana
8	Mery Felisa Mancilla	4 May 1984 (age 42)	186	72	300	306	Santiago de Cali
9	Juliana Toro	29 January 1995 (age 31)	159	62	268	256	LIGA ANTIOQUEÑA
10	Diana Arrechea	14 September 1994 (age 32)	176	67	293	278	Liga Vallecaucana
11	Libys Marmolejo	9 May 1992 (age 34)	181	53	287	282	Liga Antioqueña
12	Ivonne Daniela Montaño	12 November 1995 (age 30)	187	72	302	291	Liga Vallecaucana
13	Camila Gomez	6 July 1995 (age 31)	158	61	263	260	Liga Vallecaucana
15	Maria Alejandra Marin (C)	4 November 1995 (age 31)	178	68	281	270	LIGA BOLIVARENSE
16	Melissa Rangel	16 October 1994 (age 32)
17	Daniela Castro	5 June 1993 (age 33)	184	53	293	290	Liga Bolivarense
19	Maria Martinez	19 May 1995 (age 31)	178	71	293	281	LIGA VALLECAUCANA
20	Amanda Coneo	20 December 1996 (age 29)	177	60	295	280

=== Croatia ===
Head coach:	Aksentijevic Miroslav
Assistant coach:	Bojan Mirkovic
Physiotherapist:	Francesco D'altri

N°	Name	Date of birth	Height	Weight	Spike	Block	2016 Club
1	Rene Sain	23 April 1997 (age 29)	167	56	240	281
2	Ana Grbac	23 March 1988 (age 38)	186	64	302	288	Volero Zurich
3	Ema Strunjak	24 September 1999 (age 27)	178	68	259	291
4	Nikolina Jelić	9 November 1991 (age 34)	188	69	310	294	KS DevelopRes Rzeszów
5	Iva Jurišić	24 March 1994 (age 32)	186	69	300	290	HAOK Mladost
6	Mira Topić	2 June 1983 (age 43)	184	72	300	284	VC Tyumen
7	Amanda Gaši	13 May 1998 (age 28)	162	56	279	250	HAOK Mladost
8	Mia Jerkov (C)	5 December 1982 (age 43)	192	68	310	295	Bursa Buyuksehir
9	Bruna Ana Vranković	26 July 1998 (age 28)	187	81	292	287
10	Klara Perić	30 March 1998 (age 28)	180	72	289	273
11	Beta Dumančić	26 March 1991 (age 35)	189	75	301	293	ŽOK Pivovara Osijek
12	Tamara Sušić	28 November 1990 (age 35)	192	76	305	300	HAOK Mladost
13	Samanta Fabris	8 February 1992 (age 34)	188	79	322	306	Liu Jo Volley
14	Karla Klarić	5 September 1994 (age 32)	188	86	310	300	Volero Zurich
15	Bernarda Brčić	12 May 1991 (age 35)	192	81	305	297	Robur Tiboni Urbino
16	Vedrana Jakšetić	17 September 1996 (age 30)	183	72	290	274	OK Poreč
17	Jelena Alajbeg	1 October 1989 (age 37)	183	75	310	300	İller Bankası
18	Katarina Luketić	28 September 1998 (age 28)	192	78	320	304
19	Lucija Mlinar	6 May 1995 (age 31)	180	65	290	284	HAOK Mladost
20	Matea Rajković	28 April 1991 (age 35)	175	68	294	264
21	Lea Cvetnić	2 February 1999 (age 27)	188	76	301	291	HAOK Mladost

=== Cuba ===
Head coach:	Roberto Garcia Garcia
Assistant coach:	Luis G Oviedo Bonilla
Doctor(s):	Ramses Raymond Yañes
Physiotherapist:	Tarik Valdez Torrens

N°	Name	Date of birth	Height	Weight	Spike	Block	2016 Club
1	Dalila Palma Rodriguez	18 November 1999 (age 26)	182	62	301	285	Cienfuegos
2	Regla Gracia	28 May 1993 (age 33)	177	67	301	282	Camaguey
3	Alena Rojas Orta	9 August 1992 (age 34)	186	76	320	305	Habana
4	Melissa Teresa Vargas Abreu	16 October 1999 (age 27)	184	78	326	315	Cienfuegos
5	Yamila Hernandez Santas	8 November 1992 (age 33)	182	69	301	285	La Habana
6	Daymara Lescay	5 September 1992 (age 34)	184	72	310	305	Guantanamo
7	Claudia Hernandez Aguila	9 January 1997 (age 29)	181	78	225	223	La Habana
8	Diaris Pérez	16 November 1998 (age 27)	182	75	304	295	La Habana
9	Dayessi Luis Ruiz	23 October 1996 (age 30)	170	60	288	248	Camaguey
10	Emily Borrell Cruz	19 February 1992 (age 34)	167	55	270	260	Villa Clara
11	Gretell Elena Moreno Borrero	30 January 1998 (age 28)	183	68	287	280	Granma
12	Ailama Cese Montalvo	29 October 2000 (age 26)	188	58	322	308	Mayabeque
14	Dayami Sanchez Savon	14 March 1994 (age 32)	188	64	314	302	Ciudad Habana
15	Carmela Massip Mursuli	17 January 1998 (age 28)	181	65	304	295	Sancti Spiritus
16	Yelennis Diaz Cairo	14 October 1995 (age 31)	189	71	300	298	Villa Clara
17	Heidy Casanova Alvarez	6 November 1998 (age 27)	184	78	244	240	La Habana
18	Sulian Matienzo (C)	14 December 1994 (age 31)	178	75	232	230	La Habana
19	Jennifer Álvarez	19 November 1993 (age 32)	184	72	310	294	Cienfuegos
20	Heidy Rodriguez	24 June 1993 (age 33)	187	66	312	308	Villa Clara
21	Aidachi Attilah Aguero Aguilera	19 March 1999 (age 27)	177	69	304	295	Camaguey
22	Marilin Pages	5 November 1994 (age 32)	186	80	305	300	Villa Clara

=== Kazakhstan ===
Head coach:	Vyacheslav Shapran
Assistant coach:	Valeriy Shindov
Doctor(s):	Grigoriy Topkin
Physiotherapist:	Sergey Volchkov

N°	Name	Date of birth	Height	Weight	Spike	Block	2016 Club
1	Tatyana Fendrikova	23 February 1990 (age 36)	169	55	280	275	Almaty
2	Lyudmila Issayeva	26 September 1989 (age 37)	184	70	295	280	Almaty
3	Diana Kavtorina	30 December 1992 (age 33)	167	56	270	275	Irtysh-Kazchrome
4	Yekaterina Zhdanova	28 May 1992 (age 34)	183	65	280	270	Karaganda
5	Olga Nassedkina	28 December 1982 (age 43)	190	75	305	295	Zhetyssu
6	Natalya Akilova	31 May 1993 (age 33)	183	62	295	275	Karaganda
7	Zarina Sitkazinova	20 March 1993 (age 33)	182	70	295	280	Astana
8	Inna German	17 January 1983 (age 43)	182	75	300	280	Karaganda
9	Irina Lukomskaya	19 March 1991 (age 35)	176	66	280	270	Altay
10	Irina Shenberger	20 February 1992 (age 34)	180	73	290	280	Astana
11	Katerina Tatko	15 December 1992 (age 33)	182	70	285	275	Zhetyssu
12	Evgeniia Ilina	14 August 1991 (age 35)	187	78	295	285	Altay
13	Radmila Beresneva (C)	6 June 1983 (age 43)	185	70	300	295	Irtysh-Kazchrome
14	Antonina Rubtsova	30 December 1984 (age 41)	184	67	302	275	Irtysh Kazchrome
15	Ardak Maratova	3 June 1994 (age 32)	183	76	275	265	Almaty
16	Aliya Batkuldina	17 November 1995 (age 30)	181	74	273	264	Zhetyssu
17	Alla Bogdashkina	22 August 1985 (age 41)	185	65	275	270	Irtysh-Kazchrome
18	Kristina Anikonova	5 January 1991 (age 35)	183	73	295	285	Altay
19	Lyudmila Anarbayeva	12 November 1983 (age 42)	192	72	305	299	Zhetyssu
20	Yekaterina Razorenkova	3 June 1993 (age 33)	185	69	283	280	Almaty
21	Ainagul Aizharikhova	4 September 1994 (age 32)	186	65	295	285	Zhetyssu

=== Mexico ===
Head coach:	Ricardo Naranjo Ponce
Assistant coach:	Leon Lopez
Doctor(s):	Campos Chavelas
	Andrea Magdalena
Physiotherapist:	Mariana Mendez Vega

N°	Name	Date of birth	Height	Weight	Spike	Block	2016 Club
1	Gema Leon	11 March 1991 (age 35)	181	63	292	275	Nuevo León
2	Lizette Lopez Robles	14 May 1990 (age 36)	164	65	275	245	Nuevo León
3	Claudia Reséndiz	21 May 1994 (age 32)	172	72	268	260	Jalisco
4	Kathya Garcia	6 March 1998 (age 28)	175	68	286	275	Chihuahua
5	Andrea Rangel	19 May 1993 (age 33)	180	57	297	289	Nuevo León
6	Freda Maria Lopez Olmos	17 June 1988 (age 38)	164	64	235	230	Oaxaca
7	Bibiana Candelas	2 December 1983 (age 42)	194	75	310	294	Coahuila
8	Dulce Carranza (C)	29 June 1990 (age 36)	178	83	275	252	Nuevo León
9	Alejandra Segura	9 November 1993 (age 32)	177	69	291	283	Nuevo León
10	Lizbeth Sainz	14 December 1995 (age 30)	178	55	295	285	Baja California
11	Miranda Oroz Bojorquez	30 November 1996 (age 29)	182	70			Jalisco
12	Fernanda Bañuelos	19 March 1997 (age 29)	186	70	303	285	Baja California
13	Mónica Moreno	27 April 1995 (age 31)	185	83	292	289	Nuevo León
14	Montserrat Castro Narvaez	12 December 1996 (age 29)	199	85	270	268	Unam
15	Karen Paola Rivera Herrera	22 May 1999 (age 27)	163	56	212	207	Chihuahua
16	Karla Daniela Mireles Valdez	5 January 2000 (age 26)	178	60	270	250	Nuevo León
17	Karina Flores	16 August 1998 (age 28)	188	72	299	285	Nuevo León
18	Alondra Amaro Rodriguez	9 June 1998 (age 28)	188	69	275	250	Durango
19	María Fernanda Rodríguez	23 June 1997 (age 29)	185	80	287	280	Nuevo León
20	Gabriela Pérez Caro	17 May 1998 (age 28)	182	75	284	279	Distrito Federal
21	Jocelyn Urias	16 February 1996 (age 30)	190	65	296	284	Baja California

=== Peru ===
Head coach:	Mauro Marasciulo
Assistant coach:	Marco Queiroga
Doctor(s):	Julio Echevarria
Physiotherapist:	Filipe Galdino

N°	Name	Date of birth	Height	Weight	Spike	Block	2016 Club
1	Diana De La Peña	7 June 1999 (age 27)	187	60	294	295	Club Deportivo Geminis
2	Mirtha Uribe (C)	12 March 1985 (age 41)	184	67	297	286	Club Deportivo Jaamsa
3	Carla Rueda	19 April 1990 (age 36)	184	70	312	306	Club Deportivo Géminis
4	Alexandra Machado	28 February 1995 (age 31)	178	65	293	284	Club Regatas Lima
5	Vanessa Palacios	3 July 1984 (age 42)	167	66	275	260	Club Cesar Vallejo
6	Alexandra Muñoz	16 August 1992 (age 34)	180	63	287	281	Club Deportivo Geminis
7	Susan Egoavil	16 January 1988 (age 38)	162	52	265	251	Club Sporting Cristal
8	Maguilaura Frias	28 May 1997 (age 29)	186	71	291	280	San Martin De Porres
9	Katherine Regalado	11 March 1998 (age 28)	190	66	296	287	Club Alianza Lima
10	Katherinne Olemar	10 May 1993 (age 33)	176	65	293	280	Club Sporting Cristal
11	Clarivett Yllescas	11 August 1993 (age 33)	185	63	305	295	Club Cesar Vallejo
12	Angela Leyva	22 November 1996 (age 29)	184	70	312	291	San Martín de Porres
13	Shiamara Almeida Chavez	19 February 1996 (age 30)	172	62	286	275	Club Sporting Cristal
14	Andrea Urrutia	31 May 1997 (age 29)	185	65	278	275	San Martin De Porres
15	Hilary Palma	5 January 1997 (age 29)	169	65	268	261	Club Sporting Cristal
16	Nathalie Andrea Sandoval Padilla	14 June 1989 (age 37)	178	65	293	284	Club Deportivo Géminis
17	Diana Magallanes	1 September 1998 (age 28)	181	75	283	278	Club Sporting Cristal
18	Coraima Gomez	9 August 1996 (age 30)	179	70	300	285	Club Alianza Lima
19	Esmeralda Sanchez	1 September 1998 (age 28)	162	60	263	252	Club Alianza Lima
20	Miriam Patiño	28 March 1990 (age 36)	167	67	275	260	Club Regatas Lima
