= 2015 FIVB Volleyball Women's World Cup squads =

This article shows the rosters of all participating teams at the 2015 FIVB Volleyball Women's World Cup in Japan.

== Algeria ==
The following is the Algerian roster in the 2015 FIVB Volleyball Women's World Cup.

Head coach: Henni Abdelhalim

No.	Name	Date of birth	Height	Weight	Spike	Block	2015 club
1	Nadira Ait Oumghar	9 October 1994	1.85 m (6 ft 1 in)	77 kg (170 lb)	281 cm (111 in)	263 cm (104 in)	(Algeria) Seddouk Volleyball
4	Zaidi Amel	3 March 1995	1.75 m (5 ft 9 in)	58 kg (128 lb)	278 cm (109 in)	260 cm (100 in)	(Algeria) R.C. Béjaïa
5	Chanez Ayadi	8 February 1994	1.73 m (5 ft 8 in)	59 kg (130 lb)	271 cm (107 in)	254 cm (100 in)	(Algeria) NC Béjaïa
7	Nawel Hammouche	25 April 1997	1.85 m (6 ft 1 in)	62 kg (137 lb)	275 cm (108 in)	265 cm (104 in)	(Algeria) NC Béjaïa
8	Safia Imadali	15 June 1997	1.78 m (5 ft 10 in)	60 kg (130 lb)	272 cm (107 in)	260 cm (100 in)	(Algeria) OEFly
9	Silya Magnana (c)	16 March 1991	1.81 m (5 ft 11 in)	68 kg (150 lb)	274 cm (108 in)	261 cm (103 in)	(Algeria) MB Béjaïa
12	Melissa Kasri	13 February 1998	1.82 m (6 ft 0 in)	59 kg (130 lb)	280 cm (110 in)	270 cm (110 in)	(Algeria) NC Béjaïa
13	Ryma Mebarki	28 January 1994	1.66 m (5 ft 5 in)	63 kg (139 lb)	260 cm (100 in)	245 cm (96 in)	(Algeria) MB Béjaïa
15	Amira Sadi	10 September 1994	1.87 m (6 ft 2 in)	70 kg (150 lb)	280 cm (110 in)	273 cm (107 in)	(Algeria) RIJA
17	Sarra Belhocine	18 September 1994	1.79 m (5 ft 10 in)	62 kg (137 lb)	272 cm (107 in)	260 cm (100 in)	(Algeria) GS Pétroliers
19	Chahla Benmokhtar	30 December 1997	1.79 m (5 ft 10 in)	53 kg (117 lb)	282 cm (111 in)	270 cm (110 in)	(Algeria) Seddouk VB
20	Nour El Houda Bouregua	7 May 1992	1.78 m (5 ft 10 in)	56 kg (123 lb)	276 cm (109 in)	260 cm (100 in)	(Algeria) WOC

== Argentina ==
The following is the Argentine roster in the 2015 FIVB Volleyball Women's World Cup.

Head coach: Guillermo Orduna

No.	Name	Date of birth	Height	Weight	Spike	Block	2015 club
2	Tanya Acosta	11 March 1991	1.82 m (6 ft 0 in)	70 kg (150 lb)	287 cm (113 in)	280 cm (110 in)	(Argentina) Gimnasia y Esgrima (LP)
4	Marcia Scacchi	29 January 1982	1.75 m (5 ft 9 in)	70 kg (150 lb)	297 cm (117 in)	290 cm (110 in)	(Argentina) GER
5	Lucía Fresco	14 May 1991	1.95 m (6 ft 5 in)	92 kg (203 lb)	304 cm (120 in)	290 cm (110 in)	(Italy) Robur Tiboni Urbino Volley
7	Natalia Aispurua	20 December 1991	1.92 m (6 ft 4 in)	78 kg (172 lb)	310 cm (120 in)	293 cm (115 in)	(Argentina) Boca Juniors
8	Sol Piccolo	11 September 1996	1.84 m (6 ft 0 in)	74 kg (163 lb)	294 cm (116 in)	282 cm (111 in)	(Argentina) Vélez Sarsfield
9	Clarisa Sagardia	29 June 1989	1.74 m (5 ft 9 in)	67 kg (148 lb)	290 cm (110 in)	280 cm (110 in)	(Argentina) Boca Juniors
10	Emilce Sosa (c)	11 September 1987	1.77 m (5 ft 10 in)	75 kg (165 lb)	305 cm (120 in)	295 cm (116 in)	(Brazil) Rio do Sul
11	Julieta Lazcano	25 July 1989	1.90 m (6 ft 3 in)	74 kg (163 lb)	312 cm (123 in)	293 cm (115 in)	(France) Istres Volley-Ball
12	Tatiana Rizzo	30 December 1986	1.78 m (5 ft 10 in)	64 kg (141 lb)	280 cm (110 in)	268 cm (106 in)	(Argentina) Boca Juniors
13	Leticia Boscacci	8 November 1985	1.86 m (6 ft 1 in)	70 kg (150 lb)	302 cm (119 in)	284 cm (112 in)	(Switzerland) Kanti Schaffhausen
14	Josefina Fernández	17 August 1991	1.75 m (5 ft 9 in)	72 kg (159 lb)	294 cm (116 in)	284 cm (112 in)	(Switzerland) Volleyball Franches-Montagnes
18	Yael Castiglione	27 September 1985	1.84 m (6 ft 0 in)	75 kg (165 lb)	295 cm (116 in)	281 cm (111 in)	(Brazil) Rio do Sul

== China ==
The following is the Chinese roster in the 2015 FIVB Volleyball Women's World Cup.

Head coach: Lang Ping

No.	Name	Date of birth	Height	Weight	Spike	Block	2015 club
1	Yuan Xinyue	21 December 1996	1.99 m (6 ft 6 in)	78 kg (172 lb)	317 cm (125 in)	311 cm (122 in)	(China) Army
2	Zhu Ting	29 November 1994	1.95 m (6 ft 5 in)	78 kg (172 lb)	327 cm (129 in)	300 cm (120 in)	(China) Henan
5	Shen Jingsi	3 May 1989	1.86 m (6 ft 1 in)	75 kg (165 lb)	305 cm (120 in)	294 cm (116 in)	(China) Army
6	Yang Junjing	15 May 1989	1.90 m (6 ft 3 in)	70 kg (150 lb)	308 cm (121 in)	300 cm (120 in)	(China) Army
7	Wei Qiuyue	26 September 1988	1.82 m (6 ft 0 in)	65 kg (143 lb)	305 cm (120 in)	300 cm (120 in)	(China) Tianjin
8	Zeng Chunlei (c)	3 November 1989	1.87 m (6 ft 2 in)	67 kg (148 lb)	315 cm (124 in)	315 cm (124 in)	(China) Beijing
9	Zhang Changning	6 November 1995	1.93 m (6 ft 4 in)	80 kg (180 lb)	315 cm (124 in)	303 cm (119 in)	(China) Jiangsu
11	Zhang Xiaoya	4 October 1992	1.89 m (6 ft 2 in)	60 kg (130 lb)	310 cm (120 in)	300 cm (120 in)	(China) Sichuan
15	Lin Li	5 July 1992	1.71 m (5 ft 7 in)	65 kg (143 lb)	294 cm (116 in)	294 cm (116 in)	(China) Fujian
16	Ding Xia	13 January 1990	1.80 m (5 ft 11 in)	61 kg (134 lb)	305 cm (120 in)	300 cm (120 in)	(China) Liaoning
17	Yan Ni	2 March 1987	1.92 m (6 ft 4 in)	74 kg (163 lb)	317 cm (125 in)	306 cm (120 in)	(China) Liaoning
18	Wang Mengjie	14 November 1995	1.72 m (5 ft 8 in)	65 kg (143 lb)	289 cm (114 in)	280 cm (110 in)	(China) Shandong
19	Liu Yanhan	19 January 1993	1.88 m (6 ft 2 in)	75 kg (165 lb)	315 cm (124 in)	305 cm (120 in)	(China) Army
21	Liu Xiaotong	16 February 1990	1.88 m (6 ft 2 in)	70 kg (150 lb)	312 cm (123 in)	300 cm (120 in)	(China) Beijing

== Cuba ==
The following is the Cuban roster in the 2015 FIVB Volleyball Women's World Cup.

Head coach: Juan Carlos Gala

No.	Name	Date of birth	Height	Weight	Spike	Block	2015 club
2	Regla Gracia	28 May 1993	1.77 m (5 ft 10 in)	67 kg (148 lb)	301 cm (119 in)	282 cm (111 in)	(Cuba) Camagüey
3	Alena Rojas	9 August 1992	1.86 m (6 ft 1 in)	76 kg (168 lb)	320 cm (130 in)	305 cm (120 in)	(Cuba) La Habana
4	Melissa Vargas	16 October 1999	1.84 m (6 ft 0 in)	78 kg (172 lb)	244 cm (96 in)	242 cm (95 in)	(Cuba) Cienfuegos
5	Yamila Hernández	8 November 1992	1.82 m (6 ft 0 in)	69 kg (152 lb)	301 cm (119 in)	285 cm (112 in)	(Cuba) La Habana
6	Daymara Lescay	5 September 1992	1.84 m (6 ft 0 in)	72 kg (159 lb)	308 cm (121 in)	290 cm (110 in)	(Cuba) Guantanamo
9	Dayessi Luis	23 October 1996	1.70 m (5 ft 7 in)	60 kg (130 lb)	288 cm (113 in)	248 cm (98 in)	(Cuba) Camagüey
10	Emily Borrell	19 February 1992	1.67 m (5 ft 6 in)	55 kg (121 lb)	270 cm (110 in)	260 cm (100 in)	(Cuba) Villa Clara
11	Gretell Moreno	30 January 1998	1.83 m (6 ft 0 in)	68 kg (150 lb)	287 cm (113 in)	280 cm (110 in)	(Cuba) Granma
17	Heidy Casanova	6 November 1998	1.84 m (6 ft 0 in)	78 kg (172 lb)	244 cm (96 in)	240 cm (94 in)	(Cuba) La Habana
18	Sulian Matienzo (c)	14 December 1994	1.78 m (5 ft 10 in)	75 kg (165 lb)	232 cm (91 in)	230 cm (91 in)	(Cuba) La Habana
19	Jennifer Álvarez	19 November 1993	1.84 m (6 ft 0 in)	72 kg (159 lb)	310 cm (120 in)	294 cm (116 in)	(Cuba) Cienfuegos
20	Heidy Rodríguez	24 June 1993	1.87 m (6 ft 2 in)	66 kg (146 lb)	312 cm (123 in)	308 cm (121 in)	(Cuba) Villa Clara

== Dominican Republic ==
The following is the Dominican roster in the 2015 FIVB Volleyball Women's World Cup.

Head coach: Marcos Kwiek

No.	Name	Date of birth	Height	Weight	Spike	Block	2015 club
1	Annerys Vargas	7 August 1981	1.96 m (6 ft 5 in)	70 kg (150 lb)	327 cm (129 in)	320 cm (130 in)	(Dominican Republic) Seleccion Nacional
4	Marianne Fersola	16 January 1992	1.91 m (6 ft 3 in)	60 kg (130 lb)	315 cm (124 in)	310 cm (120 in)	(Dominican Republic) Mirador
5	Brenda Castillo	5 June 1992	1.67 m (5 ft 6 in)	55 kg (121 lb)	245 cm (96 in)	230 cm (91 in)	(Dominican Republic) San Cristóbal
6	Camil Domínguez	7 December 1991	1.76 m (5 ft 9 in)	75 kg (165 lb)	232 cm (91 in)	275 cm (108 in)	(Dominican Republic) Mirador
7	Niverka Marte	19 October 1990	1.78 m (5 ft 10 in)	71 kg (157 lb)	295 cm (116 in)	283 cm (111 in)	(Dominican Republic) Deportivo Nacional
13	Erasma Moreno	25 November 1991	1.83 m (6 ft 0 in)	75 kg (165 lb)	289 cm (114 in)	304 cm (120 in)	(Dominican Republic) Monte Plata
14	Prisilla Rivera (c)	29 December 1984	1.83 m (6 ft 0 in)	67 kg (148 lb)	309 cm (122 in)	305 cm (120 in)	(Dominican Republic) San Pedro
16	Yonkaira Peña	10 May 1993	1.90 m (6 ft 3 in)	70 kg (150 lb)	320 cm (130 in)	310 cm (120 in)	(Dominican Republic) Mirador
17	Gina Mambrú	21 January 1986	1.82 m (6 ft 0 in)	65 kg (143 lb)	330 cm (130 in)	315 cm (124 in)	(Dominican Republic) Los Cachorros
19	Ana Yorkira Binet	9 February 1992	1.74 m (5 ft 9 in)	58 kg (128 lb)	280 cm (110 in)	260 cm (100 in)	(Dominican Republic) Samaná
20	Brayelin Martínez	11 September 1996	2.00 m (6 ft 7 in)	72 kg (159 lb)	330 cm (130 in)	320 cm (130 in)	(Dominican Republic) Mirador
21	Jineiry Martínez	3 December 1997	1.90 m (6 ft 3 in)	68 kg (150 lb)	305 cm (120 in)	280 cm (110 in)	(Dominican Republic) Mirador

== Japan ==
The following is the Japanese roster in the 2015 FIVB Volleyball Women's World Cup.

Head coach: Masayoshi Manabe

No.	Name	Date of birth	Height	Weight	Spike	Block	2015 club
1	Miyu Nagaoka	27 July 1991	1.81 m (5 ft 11 in)	65 kg (143 lb)	310 cm (120 in)	295 cm (116 in)	(Japan) Hisamitsu Springs
2	Kotoki Zayasu	11 January 1990	1.61 m (5 ft 3 in)	59 kg (130 lb)	270 cm (110 in)	255 cm (100 in)	(Japan) Hisamitsu Springs
3	Saori Kimura (c)	16 August 1986	1.87 m (6 ft 2 in)	68 kg (150 lb)	304 cm (120 in)	293 cm (115 in)	(Japan) Toray Arrows
5	Chizuru Kotō	8 October 1982	1.73 m (5 ft 8 in)	67 kg (148 lb)	295 cm (116 in)	282 cm (111 in)	(Japan) Hisamitsu Springs
7	Mai Yamaguchi	3 July 1983	1.78 m (5 ft 10 in)	64 kg (141 lb)	302 cm (119 in)	290 cm (110 in)	(Japan) Okayama Seagulls
8	Sarina Koga	21 May 1996	1.82 m (6 ft 0 in)	68 kg (150 lb)	305 cm (120 in)	290 cm (110 in)	(Japan) NEC Red Rockets
9	Haruyo Shimamura	4 March 1992	1.85 m (6 ft 1 in)	80 kg (180 lb)	299 cm (118 in)	290 cm (110 in)	(Japan) NEC Red Rockets
12	Yuki Ishii	8 May 1991	1.82 m (6 ft 0 in)	70 kg (150 lb)	303 cm (119 in)	286 cm (113 in)	(Japan) Hisamitsu Springs
13	Mio Satō	12 February 1993	1.55 m (5 ft 1 in)	54 kg (119 lb)	250 cm (98 in)	240 cm (94 in)	(Japan) Toyota Auto Body Queenseis
15	Mami Uchiseto	25 October 1991	1.72 m (5 ft 8 in)	72 kg (159 lb)	296 cm (117 in)	285 cm (112 in)	(Japan) Hitachi Rivale
16	Saori Sakoda	18 December 1987	1.78 m (5 ft 10 in)	66 kg (146 lb)	305 cm (120 in)	279 cm (110 in)	(Japan) Toray Arrows
19	Haruka Miyashita	1 September 1994	1.79 m (5 ft 10 in)	63 kg (139 lb)	298 cm (117 in)	272 cm (107 in)	(Japan) Okayama Seagulls
21	Riho Otake	23 December 1993	1.84 m (6 ft 0 in)	70 kg (150 lb)	306 cm (120 in)	296 cm (117 in)	(Japan) Denso Airybees
22	Yurie Nabeya	15 December 1993	1.78 m (5 ft 10 in)	60 kg (130 lb)	302 cm (119 in)	285 cm (112 in)	(Japan) Denso Airybees

== Kenya ==
The following is the Kenyan roster in the 2015 FIVB Volleyball Women's World Cup.

Head coach: David Lung'aho

No.	Name	Date of birth	Height	Weight	Spike	Block	2015 club
1	Jane Wairimu	24 March 1985	1.74 m (5 ft 9 in)	60 kg (130 lb)	300 cm (120 in)	285 cm (112 in)	Kenya Prisons
2	Everlyne Makuto	25 August 1990	1.81 m (5 ft 11 in)	64 kg (141 lb)	328 cm (129 in)	308 cm (121 in)	Kenya Prisons
4	Esther Wangeci (c)	22 November 1990	1.80 m (5 ft 11 in)	73 kg (161 lb)	302 cm (119 in)	296 cm (117 in)	Kenya Pipelines
7	Jannet Wanja	24 February 1984	1.75 m (5 ft 9 in)	59 kg (130 lb)	299 cm (118 in)	287 cm (113 in)	Kenya Pipelines
8	Triza Atuka	14 April 1992	1.88 m (6 ft 2 in)	65 kg (143 lb)	298 cm (117 in)	293 cm (115 in)	Kenya Pipelines
9	Elizabeth Wanyama	27 May 1987	1.74 m (5 ft 9 in)	68 kg (150 lb)	270 cm (110 in)	260 cm (100 in)	Kenya Prisons
10	Noel Murambi	29 January 1989	1.78 m (5 ft 10 in)	68 kg (150 lb)	302 cm (119 in)	297 cm (117 in)	Kenya Pipelines
12	Lydia Maiyo	3 November 1988	1.85 m (6 ft 1 in)	75 kg (165 lb)	325 cm (128 in)	315 cm (124 in)	Kenya Prisons
14	Mercy Moim	1 January 1989	1.83 m (6 ft 0 in)	72 kg (159 lb)	320 cm (130 in)	308 cm (121 in)	Kenya Prisons
15	Brackcides Khadambi	14 May 1984	1.80 m (5 ft 11 in)	70 kg (150 lb)	310 cm (120 in)	306 cm (120 in)	Kenya Prisons
16	Ruth Jepngetich	9 April 1990	1.86 m (6 ft 1 in)	74 kg (163 lb)	315 cm (124 in)	300 cm (120 in)	Kenya Pipelines
18	Monica Biama	24 March 1988	1.76 m (5 ft 9 in)	59 kg (130 lb)	300 cm (120 in)	270 cm (110 in)	Kenya Pipelines

== Peru ==
The following is the Peruvian roster in the 2015 FIVB Volleyball Women's World Cup.

Head coach: Mauro Marasciulo

No.	Name	Date of birth	Height	Weight	Spike	Block	2015 club
1	Diana De La Peña	7 June 1999	1.87 m (6 ft 2 in)	60 kg (130 lb)	294 cm (116 in)	295 cm (116 in)	(Peru) Deportivo Géminis
2	Mirtha Uribe (c)	12 March 1985	1.84 m (6 ft 0 in)	67 kg (148 lb)	297 cm (117 in)	286 cm (113 in)	(Peru) Deportivo Wanka
3	Carla Rueda	19 April 1990	1.84 m (6 ft 0 in)	70 kg (150 lb)	312 cm (123 in)	306 cm (120 in)	(Peru) Deportivo Géminis
4	Maricarmen Guerrero	17 January 1999	1.81 m (5 ft 11 in)	70 kg (150 lb)	290 cm (110 in)	280 cm (110 in)	(Peru) Túpac Amaru
6	Alexandra Muñoz	16 August 1992	1.80 m (5 ft 11 in)	63 kg (139 lb)	287 cm (113 in)	281 cm (111 in)	(Peru) Universidad César Vallejo
7	Susan Egoavil	16 January 1988	1.62 m (5 ft 4 in)	52 kg (115 lb)	265 cm (104 in)	251 cm (99 in)	(Peru) Sporting Cristal
9	Katherine Regalado	11 March 1998	1.88 m (6 ft 2 in)	66 kg (146 lb)	291 cm (115 in)	284 cm (112 in)	(Peru) Alianza Lima
10	Zoila La Rosa	31 May 1990	1.76 m (5 ft 9 in)	57 kg (126 lb)	285 cm (112 in)	280 cm (110 in)	(Peru) Universidad San Martin
11	Clarivett Yllescas	11 August 1993	1.85 m (6 ft 1 in)	63 kg (139 lb)	305 cm (120 in)	295 cm (116 in)	(Peru) Universidad César Vallejo
13	Katherinne Olemar	10 May 1993	1.76 m (5 ft 9 in)	65 kg (143 lb)	293 cm (115 in)	280 cm (110 in)	(Peru) Sporting Cristal
15	Karla Ortiz	20 October 1991	1.82 m (6 ft 0 in)	60 kg (130 lb)	300 cm (120 in)	290 cm (110 in)	(Peru) Sporting Cristal

== Russia ==
The following is the Russian roster in the 2015 FIVB Volleyball Women's World Cup.

Head coach: Yuri Marichev

№	Name	Date of birth	Height	Weight	Spike	Block	2015 club
1	Yana Shcherban	6 September 1989	1.85 m (6 ft 1 in)	71 kg (157 lb)	298 cm (117 in)	294 cm (116 in)	(Russia) Dinamo Krasnodar
2	Victoria Kuzyakina	1 June 1985	1.75 m (5 ft 9 in)	70 kg (150 lb)	290 cm (110 in)	287 cm (113 in)	(Russia) Omichka Omsk
5	Aleksandra Pasynkova	14 April 1987	1.90 m (6 ft 3 in)	75 kg (165 lb)	313 cm (123 in)	305 cm (120 in)	(Russia) Dinamo Krasnodar
7	Ekaterina Lyubushkina	2 January 1990	1.88 m (6 ft 2 in)	81 kg (179 lb)	305 cm (120 in)	301 cm (119 in)	(Italy) Busto Arsizio
8	Nataliya Goncharova	1 June 1989	1.94 m (6 ft 4 in)	75 kg (165 lb)	315 cm (124 in)	306 cm (120 in)	(Russia) Dinamo Moscow
9	Daria Isaeva	29 March 1990	1.86 m (6 ft 1 in)	75 kg (165 lb)	310 cm (120 in)	304 cm (120 in)	(Russia) Omichka Omsk
10	Ekaterina Kosianenko (c)	2 February 1990	1.78 m (5 ft 10 in)	64 kg (141 lb)	290 cm (110 in)	285 cm (112 in)	(Russia) Zarechie Odintsovo
12	Ekaterina Orlova	21 October 1987	1.93 m (6 ft 4 in)	77 kg (170 lb)	307 cm (121 in)	301 cm (119 in)	(Russia) Omichka Omsk
13	Evgeniya Startseva	12 February 1989	1.85 m (6 ft 1 in)	68 kg (150 lb)	294 cm (116 in)	290 cm (110 in)	(Russia) Dinamo Kazan
14	Irina Fetisova	7 September 1994	1.90 m (6 ft 3 in)	76 kg (168 lb)	307 cm (121 in)	286 cm (113 in)	(Russia) Zarechie Odintsovo
15	Tatiana Kosheleva	23 December 1988	1.91 m (6 ft 3 in)	67 kg (148 lb)	315 cm (124 in)	305 cm (120 in)	(Russia) Dinamo Moscow
17	Natalia Malykh	8 December 1993	1.87 m (6 ft 2 in)	65 kg (143 lb)	308 cm (121 in)	297 cm (117 in)	(Russia) Zarechie Odintsovo
18	Kseniia Ilchenko	31 October 1994	1.83 m (6 ft 0 in)	64 kg (141 lb)	300 cm (120 in)	286 cm (113 in)	(Russia) Uralochka Yekaterinburg
19	Anna Malova	16 April 1990	1.75 m (5 ft 9 in)	59 kg (130 lb)	286 cm (113 in)	290 cm (110 in)	(Russia) Dinamo Moscow

== Serbia ==
The following is the Serbian roster in the 2015 FIVB Volleyball Women's World Cup.

Head coach: Zoran Terzić

№	Name	Date of birth	Height	Weight	Spike	Block	2015 club
3	Bianka Buša	25 July 1994	1.67 m (5 ft 6 in)	74 kg (163 lb)	293 cm (115 in)	282 cm (111 in)	(Serbia) Vizura Beograd
4	Bojana Živković	29 March 1988	1.85 m (6 ft 1 in)	70 kg (150 lb)	292 cm (115 in)	284 cm (112 in)	(Turkey) İlbank
5	Mina Popović	16 September 1994	1.87 m (6 ft 2 in)	73 kg (161 lb)	315 cm (124 in)	305 cm (120 in)	(Serbia) Crvena Zvezda
6	Tijana Malešević	18 March 1991	1.84 m (6 ft 0 in)	73 kg (161 lb)	289 cm (114 in)	288 cm (113 in)	(Czech Republic) VK Prostějov
9	Brankica Mihajlović	13 April 1991	1.89 m (6 ft 2 in)	64 kg (141 lb)	282 cm (111 in)	264 cm (104 in)	(Turkey) Fenerbahçe
10	Maja Ognjenović (c)	6 August 1984	1.83 m (6 ft 0 in)	68 kg (150 lb)	290 cm (110 in)	270 cm (110 in)	(Poland) Chemik Police
11	Stefana Veljković	9 January 1990	1.90 m (6 ft 3 in)	76 kg (168 lb)	320 cm (130 in)	305 cm (120 in)	(Poland) Chemik Police
12	Jelena Nikolić	13 April 1982	1.94 m (6 ft 4 in)	79 kg (174 lb)	315 cm (124 in)	310 cm (120 in)	(Azerbaijan) Azerrail Baku
13	Ana Bjelica	3 April 1992	1.90 m (6 ft 3 in)	78 kg (172 lb)	310 cm (120 in)	305 cm (120 in)	(Poland) Chemik Police
15	Jovana Stevanović	30 June 1992	1.92 m (6 ft 4 in)	72 kg (159 lb)	308 cm (121 in)	295 cm (116 in)	(Italy) Pomi Casalmaggiore
16	Milena Rašić	25 October 1990	1.93 m (6 ft 4 in)	75 kg (165 lb)	303 cm (119 in)	293 cm (115 in)	(Turkey) VakifBank Istanbul
17	Silvija Popović (L)	15 March 1986	1.78 m (5 ft 10 in)	65 kg (143 lb)	236 cm (93 in)	226 cm (89 in)	(Switzerland) Voléro Zürich
18	Suzana Ćebić (L)	11 September 1984	1.67 m (5 ft 6 in)	60 kg (130 lb)	279 cm (110 in)	255 cm (100 in)	(Romania) Univerzitatea Tirgoviste
19	Tijana Bošković	8 March 1997	1.91 m (6 ft 3 in)	71 kg (157 lb)	303 cm (119 in)	295 cm (116 in)	(Serbia) Vizura Beograd

== South Korea ==
The following is the Korean roster in the 2015 FIVB Volleyball Women's World Cup.

Head coach: Lee Jung-chul

№	Name	Date of birth	Height	Weight	Spike	Block	2015 club
1	Lee So-young	17 October 1994	1.76 m (5 ft 9 in)	69 kg (152 lb)	280 cm (110 in)	265 cm (104 in)	(South Korea) GS Caltex
4	Kim Hee-jin	29 April 1991	1.85 m (6 ft 1 in)	77 kg (170 lb)	300 cm (120 in)	295 cm (116 in)	(South Korea) IBK Altos
5	Na Hyun-jung	10 March 1990	1.63 m (5 ft 4 in)	54 kg (119 lb)	257 cm (101 in)	250 cm (98 in)	(South Korea) GS Caltex
6	Hwang Youn-joo	13 August 1986	1.77 m (5 ft 10 in)	68 kg (150 lb)	303 cm (119 in)	294 cm (116 in)	(South Korea) Hyundai E&C
7	Lee Jae-yeong	15 October 1996	1.79 m (5 ft 10 in)	66 kg (146 lb)	282 cm (111 in)	263 cm (104 in)	(South Korea) Heungkuk Life
10	Kim Yeon-koung (c)	26 February 1988	1.92 m (6 ft 4 in)	73 kg (161 lb)	307 cm (121 in)	299 cm (118 in)	(Turkey) Fenerbahçe
11	Kim Su-ji	11 July 1987	1.86 m (6 ft 1 in)	68 kg (150 lb)	303 cm (119 in)	294 cm (116 in)	(South Korea) Heungkuk Life
13	Park Jeong-ah	26 March 1993	1.85 m (6 ft 1 in)	68 kg (150 lb)	300 cm (120 in)	290 cm (110 in)	(South Korea) IBK Altos
14	Yang Hyo-jin	14 December 1989	1.90 m (6 ft 3 in)	72 kg (159 lb)	287 cm (113 in)	280 cm (110 in)	(South Korea) Hyundai E&C
17	Chae Seon-ah	8 June 1992	1.75 m (5 ft 9 in)	68 kg (150 lb)	280 cm (110 in)	262 cm (103 in)	(South Korea) IBK Altos
18	Lee Da-yeong	15 October 1996	1.79 m (5 ft 10 in)	63 kg (139 lb)	282 cm (111 in)	263 cm (104 in)	(South Korea) Hyundai E&C
19	Cho Song-hwa	12 March 1993	1.76 m (5 ft 9 in)	68 kg (150 lb)	280 cm (110 in)	260 cm (100 in)	(South Korea) Heungkuk Life
20	Yim Myung-Ok	5 May 1986	1.76 m (5 ft 9 in)	65 kg (143 lb)	278 cm (109 in)	266 cm (105 in)	(South Korea) Korea Expressway Corporation

== United States ==
The following is the American roster in the 2015 FIVB Volleyball Women's World Cup.

Head coach: Karch Kiraly

No.	Name	Date of birth	Height	Weight	Spike	Block	2015 club
1	Alisha Glass	5 April 1988	1.84 m (6 ft 0 in)	72 kg (159 lb)	305 cm (120 in)	300 cm (120 in)	(Italy) Imoco Volley
2	Kayla Banwarth	21 January 1989	1.78 m (5 ft 10 in)	75 kg (165 lb)	295 cm (116 in)	283 cm (111 in)	(United States) Usa Volleyball Team
8	Lauren Gibbemeyer	8 September 1988	1.87 m (6 ft 2 in)	71 kg (157 lb)	307 cm (121 in)	293 cm (115 in)	(Italy) Volleyball Casalmaggiore
10	Jordan Larson-Burbach	16 October 1986	1.88 m (6 ft 2 in)	75 kg (165 lb)	302 cm (119 in)	295 cm (116 in)	(Turkey) Eczacıbaşı Istanbul
11	Megan Easy	15 October 1988	1.91 m (6 ft 3 in)	80 kg (180 lb)	320 cm (130 in)	297 cm (117 in)	(United States) Usa Volleyball Team
13	Christa Harmotto Dietzen (c)	12 October 1986	1.88 m (6 ft 2 in)	79 kg (174 lb)	322 cm (127 in)	300 cm (120 in)	(United States) Usa Volleyball Team
14	Nicole Fawcett	16 December 1986	1.91 m (6 ft 3 in)	82 kg (181 lb)	310 cm (120 in)	291 cm (115 in)	(South Korea) Korea Expressway Corporation
15	Kimberly Hill	30 November 1989	1.93 m (6 ft 4 in)	72 kg (159 lb)	320 cm (130 in)	310 cm (120 in)	(Italy) AGIL Volley Novara
16	Foluke Akinradewo	5 October 1987	1.91 m (6 ft 3 in)	79 kg (174 lb)	331 cm (130 in)	300 cm (120 in)	(Azerbaijan) Rabita Baku
17	Natalie Hagglund	1 July 1992	1.78 m (5 ft 10 in)	68 kg (150 lb)	292 cm (115 in)	290 cm (110 in)	(Switzerland) Voléro Zürich
18	Molly Kreklow	17 February 1992	1.81 m (5 ft 11 in)	64 kg (141 lb)	291 cm (115 in)	281 cm (111 in)	(Germany) Dresdner SC
21	TeTori Dixon	4 August 1992	1.91 m (6 ft 3 in)	83 kg (183 lb)	306 cm (120 in)	295 cm (116 in)	(Azerbaijan) Rabita Baku
23	Kelsey Robinson	25 June 1992	1.88 m (6 ft 2 in)	75 kg (165 lb)	306 cm (120 in)	300 cm (120 in)	(China) Beijing BAW
25	Karsta Lowe	2 February 1993	1.93 m (6 ft 4 in)	75 kg (165 lb)	315 cm (124 in)	305 cm (120 in)	(Puerto Rico) Naranjito Las Changas

== See also ==
- 2015 FIVB Volleyball Men's World Cup squads
