= Jibbigo =

Offline language translation application

Jibbigo was a mobile offline language translation application that was developed by Mobile Technologies, LLC and Dr. Alex Waibel, a professor at Carnegie Mellon. Jibbigo is an offline voice translator and does not need phone or data connectivity to function. Spanish-English Jibbigo was released in September, 2009 as the first offline Speech Translation application. The company has since expanded its offerings to include ten language pairs sold on both Apple's App Store and Google Play.

In Jibbigo, the user holds down a record button and says a phrase. The phrase then appears as text in both languages and is spoken aloud in the target language. The app also includes an add name function, a background dictionary, and other features. On iOS, it is compatible with VoiceOver for vision impaired users.

Jibbigo was featured on an episode of "Popular Science - Future Of" by the Science Channel in early 2010 and the PBS Nova episode "The Smartest Machine on Earth" in 2011. In August 2013, it was announced that Facebook was acquiring the company.
