= Alex Waibel =

American computer scientist

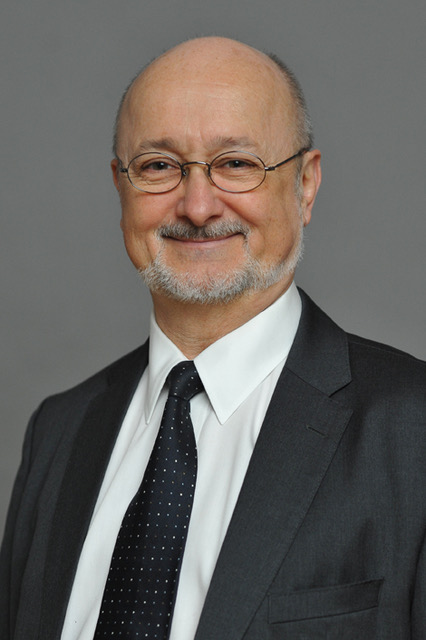
- Waibel in 2018
- Born: 2 May 1956 (age 70); Heidelberg, Germany

Academic background
- Education: Massachusetts Institute of Technology (BS), Carnegie Mellon University (MS, PhD)
- Doctoral advisor: Raj Reddy

Academic work
- Discipline: Computer Science
- Sub-discipline: Artificial Intelligence, Machine Learning, Deep Learning
- Institutions: Carnegie Mellon University, Karlsruhe Institute of Technology
- Notable students: Laurence Devillers

Alexander Waibel (born 2 May 1956) is a professor of Computer Science at Carnegie Mellon University and Karlsruhe Institute of Technology (KIT). Waibel's research focuses on automatic speech recognition, translation and human-machine interaction. His work has introduced cross-lingual communication systems, such as consecutive and simultaneous interpreting systems on a variety of platforms. In fundamental research on machine learning, he is known for the Time Delay Neural Network (TDNN), the first Convolutional Neural Network (CNN) trained by gradient descent, using backpropagation. Alex Waibel introduced the TDNN in 1987 at ATR in Japan.

== Early life and education ==
Waibel spent part of his schooling in Barcelona, before entering the humanistisches Gymnasium in Ludwigshafen. From 1976 to 1979, he studied electrical engineering and computer science at the Massachusetts Institute of Technology. He was presented with the Guillamin Award for the best undergraduate thesis in 1979. In the same year, he joined Carnegie Mellon University, where he received an MS degree in 1980 and PhD degrees in computer science and cognitive science in 1986.

== Academic career and research ==
Waibel is the director of interACT, the International Center for Advanced Communication Technologies at Karlsruhe Institute of Technology. He was one of the founders of C-STAR, an international consortium for speech translation research, and served as its chairman from 1998 to 2000. In 2003, C-STAR evolved into IWSLT, the International Conference on Spoken Language Translation. Waibel has been chairman of its steering committee since its inception. He directed and coordinated several multisite research programs in Europe and the US, including the CHIL program (FP-6 Integrated Project on multimodality) in Europe and NSF-ITR project STR-DUST (the first domain independent speech translation project) in the U.S. He was project coordinator of the IP EU-BRIDGE, funded by the EC (2012-2014).

In C-STAR, his team developed the JANUS speech translation system, the first American and European Speech Translation system, and in 2005, the first real-time simultaneous speech translation system for lectures. He developed with his lab several multimodal systems including face tracking, lip reading, emotion recognition from speech, perceptual meeting rooms, meeting recognizers, meeting browsers, and multimodal dialog systems for humanoid robots. In the early 2020s, the team proposed low-latency simultaneous interpretation algorithms that are able to deliver full end-to-end speech interpretation predictively and in real-time. The systems could deliver super-human performance at low-latency. Waibel and his team established that large neural architectures can deliver multilingual performance in speech recognition and translation, and could add new languages incrementally. Waibel demonstrated the first automatic interpreting services at the European Parliament in 2012.

From 2019 to 2023, he directed OML (Organic Machine Learning) funded by the Federal Ministry of Education and Research (Germany), a fundamental research project to develop incremental and interactive machine learning, aiming to help AI better handle surprise in language and robotics.

== Entrepreneurship ==
In the areas of speech, speech translation, and multimodal interfaces Waibel holds several patents and has founded and co-founded successful commercial ventures. He was the founder and chairman of Mobile Technologies, LLC, maker of the Jibbigo mobile speech-to-speech app to translate speech on a phone.

In 2005, Waibel unveiled the world's first automatic simultaneous translation service at a press conference at KIT and at Carnegie Mellon University stating that "the lecture translator automatically records, transcribes and translates the speech of a lecturer in real-time, and students can follow the lecture in their language on their PC or mobile phone." Deployed in 2012, it serves foreign students as the pioneering service of its kind.

In 2013, Jibbigo was acquired by Facebook Inc. and Waibel joined the company to start the Language Technology Group which became part of Facebook's broader Applied Machine Learning efforts. He was co-founder and director of MultiModal Technologies, Inc. and M*Modal, specializing in medical records, which merged with 3M in 2019.

In 2015, he cofounded KITES GmbH, to deploy simultaneous speech translation services to Universities and to the European Parliament. KITES was acquired by Zoom in 2021 and now delivers automatic subtitling and simultaneous translation during Zoom video conferencing calls. Waibel serves as Research Fellow at Zoom and on Advisory Boards in related enterprises.

== Libel case against Wikimedia Foundation ==
In October 2018, Waibel closed out a successful legal case against Wikimedia Foundation citing German libel laws. The Wikipedia article's content was ruled defamatory because the link supporting its claims was no longer active, a phenomenon known as link rot. According to the press release from the legal firm that represented Waibel, Raue LLP, German Wikipedia entry contained the incorrect claim that Waibel research was tied to American secret services, as reported by the German media (FAKT of Mitteldeutscher Rundfunk). At that time, Mitteldeutscher Rundfunk was also engaged in legal proceedings, claiming they stand by their reporting.

== Awards and honours ==
Alex Waibel is a recipient of the IEEE Senior Best Paper Award for work on the TDNN (1990). He was awarded the Alcatel-SEL "Forschungspreis Technische Kommunikation" in 1994 for his work on computer speech translation systems. In 2002, he received the Allen Newell Award for Research Excellence and the Meta Prize in 2011 with Jibbigo Mobile Translators for outstanding mobile voice translators bringing speech translation to mobile devices. In 2014, he was the recipient of the Antonio Zampolli Prize for "outstanding contributions to the advancement of Language Resources and Language Technology Evaluation within Human Language Technology", LREC. With InterACT, he was awarded a second Meta Prize in 2016. He received the Sustained Accomplishment Award of the ACM-ICMI for his work on multimodal interfaces (2019). In 2023, he became the 21st honoree to receive the IEEE James L. Flanagan Speech and Audio Processing Award for "pioneering work on speech translation and supporting technologies".

Waibel has been a Life Fellow of the IEEE, a Fellow of the International Speech Communication Association (ISCA) and a Member of the National Academy of Sciences of Germany, Leopoldina since 2017. In 2023, Waibel was inducted as Fellow into the Explorers Club citing aviation expeditions and deep sea exploration.
