= Chae Seon-ah =

South Korean volleyball player (born 1992)

Chae Seon-Ah
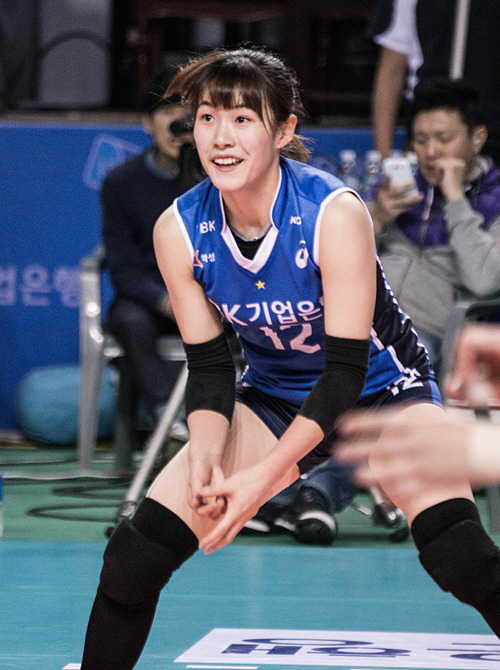

Personal information
- Nationality: South Korean
- Born: 8 June 1992 (age 34)
- Height: 175 cm (69 in)
- Weight: 68 kg (150 lb)
- Spike: 280 cm (110 in)
- Block: 262 cm (103 in)

Volleyball information
- Position: Outside hitter
- Number: 11 (club)

Career
Years	Teams
2011-2017	Hwaseong IBK Altos
2017-2023	Daejeon KGC
2023-present	Gwangju AI Peppers

National team
2015	South Korea

Chae Seon-Ah (Korean: 채선아; Hanja: 蔡善雅; born 8 June 1992) is a South Korean female volleyball player. She was part of the South Korea women's national volleyball team.

She participated in the 2015 FIVB Volleyball Women's World Cup. On club level she played for IBK in 2015.
