= Ivan Dimitrov (volleyball) =

Bulgarian volleyball player (born 1952)

Personal information
- Nationality: Bulgarian
- Born: 21 January 1952 (age 73)

Sport
- Sport: Volleyball

Ivan Dimitrov (born 21 January 1952) is a Bulgarian volleyball player. He competed in the men's tournament at the 1972 Summer Olympics.
