= Nour El Houda Bouregua =

Algerian volleyball player (born 1992)

Personal information
- Nationality: Algeria
- Born: 7 May 1992 (age 34); Algiers, Algeria
- Height: 178 cm (70 in)
- Weight: 56 kg (123 lb)
- Spike: 276 cm (109 in)
- Block: 260 cm (102 in)

Volleyball information
- Number: 20 (national team)

Career
Years	Teams
2015	WOC

National team
2015	Algeria

Nour El Houda Bouregua (born 7 May 1992) is an Algerian female volleyball player. She was part of the Algeria women's national volleyball team.

She participated in the 2015 FIVB Volleyball World Grand Prix. On club level she played for WOC in 2015.
