= Katarina Luketić =

Croatian volleyball player (born 1998)

Personal information
- Born: 28 September 1998 (age 28); Zagreb, Croatia
- Height: 1.90 m (6 ft 3 in)
- Weight: 70 kg (150 lb)
- Spike: 315 cm (124 in)
- Block: 305 cm (120 in)

Volleyball information
- Position: Opposite spiker

Career
Years	Teams
2013–2015; 2015; 2015–2018; 2018; 2019; 2019–2020; 2020–2021; 2022–	HAOK Mladost; Volero Le Cannet; HAOK Mladost; Texas Longhorns; HAOK Mladost; Exacer Montale; Zanetti Bergamo; HAOK Mladost

National team
Croatia

Katarina Luketić (born 28 September 1998) is a Croatian volleyball player. She plays as opposite spiker for Croatian club HAOK Mladost.

== International career ==
She is a member of the Croatia women's national volleyball team. She competed at the 2017 FIVB Volleyball World Grand Prix, and 2021 Women's European Volleyball League.
