= Molly Kreklow =

American volleyball player

Personal information
- Born: February 17, 1992 (age 34); St. Louis Park, Minnesota, U.S.
- Hometown: Delano, Minnesota, U.S.
- Height: 1.83 m (6 ft 0 in)

Volleyball information
- Position: Setter
- Current club: Liu Jo Nordmeccanica Modena

National team
2014–2016	United States
Medal record
Representing United States
World Cup
Bronze medal – third place	2015 Japan	Team
FIVB World Grand Prix
Gold medal – first place	2015 Omaha	Team

Molly Kreklow (born February 17, 1992) is an American indoor volleyball player who plays for Eczacıbaşı VitrA. Kreklow is a current member of the United States women's national volleyball team. Kreklow attended the University of Missouri for four years where she became a first team All-American.

== Career ==
She played college women's volleyball at the University of Missouri.

Kreklow was part of the USA national team that won the 2015 FIVB World Grand Prix gold medal and a Best Setter award.

Awards
Preceded by (Brazil) Dani Lins	Best Setter of FIVB World Grand Prix; 2015	Succeeded by (Thailand) Nootsara Tomkom
