= Rene Sain =

Croatian volleyball player (born 1997)

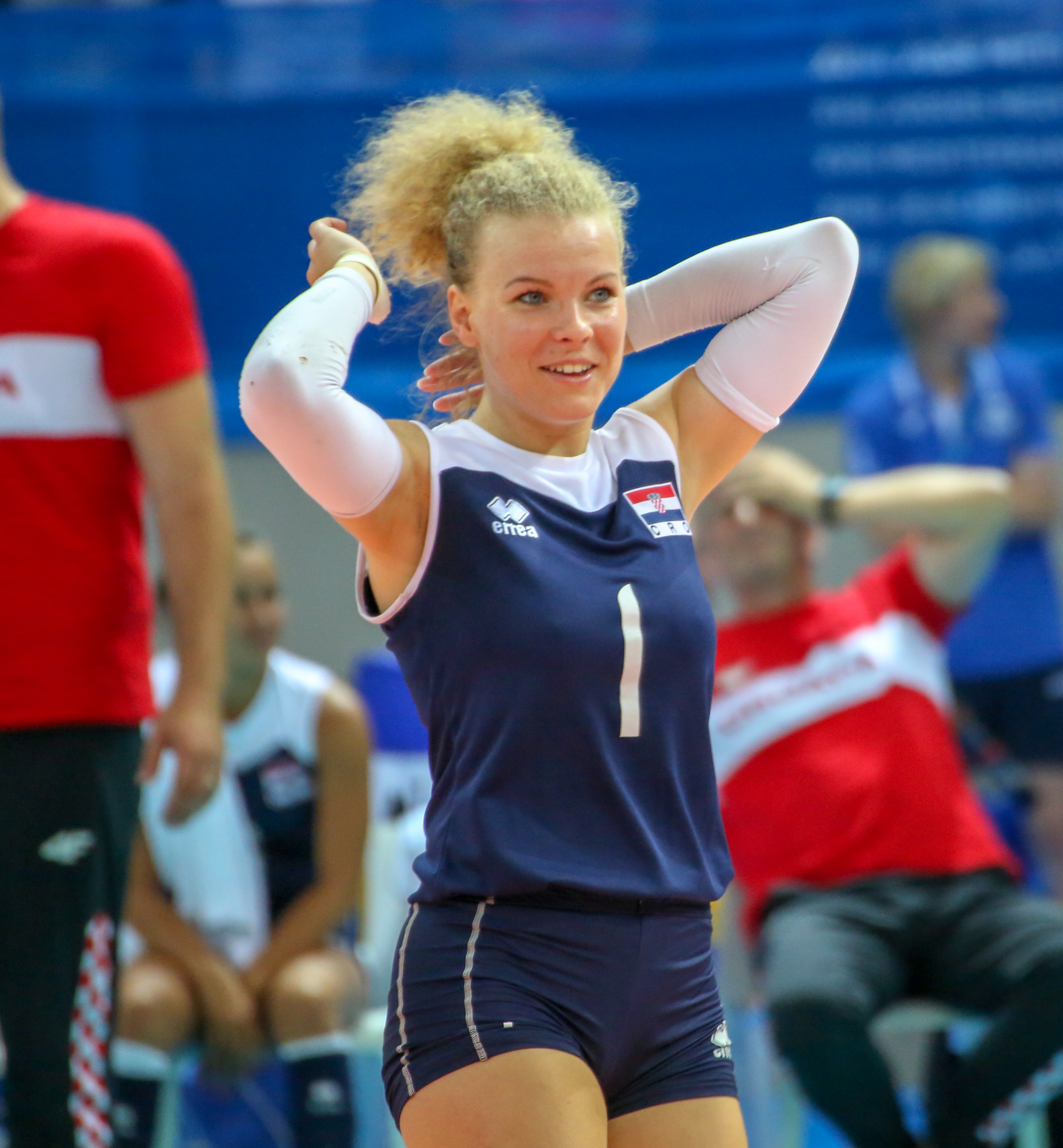
- Sain in 2018

Personal information
- Born: 23 April 1997 (age 29); Pula, Croatia
- Height: 1.63 m (5 ft 4 in)
- Weight: 54 kg (119 lb)
- Spike: 271 cm (107 in)
- Block: 251 cm (99 in)

Volleyball information
- Position: Libero
- Current club: VC Wiesbaden

Career
Years	Teams
2013–2016; 2016–2018; 2018–2019; 2019–2020; 2020–2021; 2021–2022; 2022–	OK Poreč; VK UP Olomouc; VfB Suhl Lotto Thüringen; CS Știința Bacău; RC Cannes; OK Marina Kaštela; VC Wiesbaden

National team
Croatia
Honours
Women's volleyball
Representing Croatia
Mediterranean Games
Gold medal – first place	2018 Tarragona
European League
Silver medal – second place	2021 Ruse
Silver medal – second place	2019 Varaždin

Rene Sain (born 23 April 1997) is a Croatian volleyball player. She plays as libero for German club VC Wiesbaden.

== International career ==
She is a member of the Croatia women's national volleyball team. She competed at the 2017 FIVB Volleyball World Grand Prix, and 2021 Women's European Volleyball League, winning a silver medal.
