= Safia Imadali =

Algerian volleyball player (born 1997)

Personal information
- Nationality: Algerian
- Born: 15 June 1997 (age 29)
- Height: 178 cm (70 in)
- Weight: 60 kg (132 lb)
- Spike: 272 cm (107 in)
- Block: 260 cm (102 in)

Volleyball information
- Number: 8 (national team)

Career
Years	Teams
2015	Oefly

National team
2015	Algeria

Safia Imadali (born 15 June 1997) is an Algerian female volleyball player. She was part of the Algeria women's national volleyball team.

She participated in the 2015 FIVB Volleyball World Grand Prix. On club level she played for Oefly in 2015.
