= Heidy Casanova =

Cuban volleyball player

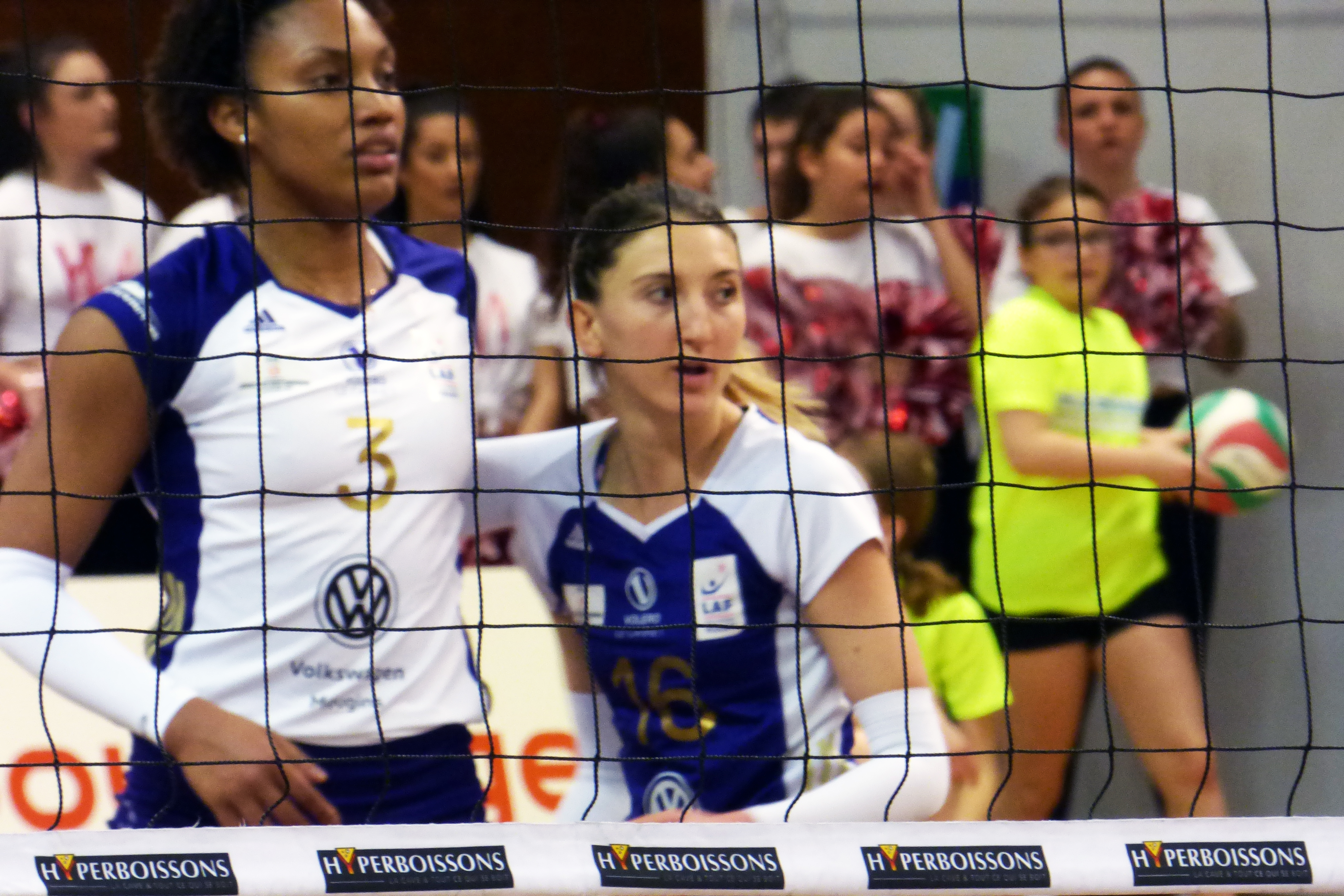

Personal information
- Full name: Heidy Casanova Álvarez
- Nationality: Cuban
- Born: 6 November 1998 (age 27)
- Height: 1.84 m (6 ft 0 in)
- Weight: 78 kg (172 lb)
- Spike: 325 cm (128 in)
- Block: 310 cm (122 in)

Career
Years	Teams
2014	Osasco Voleibol Clube

Heidy Casanova (born 6 November 1998) is a Cuban female volleyball player. She is a member of the Cuba women's national volleyball team and played for La Habana in 2014. She was part of the Cuban national team at the 2014 FIVB Volleyball Women's World Championship in Italy.

== Clubs ==
- (Cuba) La Habana (2014-2017)
- (France) Volero Le Cannet (2017-2019)
- (Brazil) Osasco Voleibol Clube (2019-2020)
- (Romania) CSM Târgoviște (2020-2021)
- (Ukraine) SC Prometey (2021-2022)
- (France) Volero Le Cannet (2021-2022)
- (China) Beijing BAIC Motor (2022-2023)
- (Turkey) Bolu Bld. (2023)
- (Romania) CSO Voluntari (2023-2024)
- (United States) Athletes Unlimited (2024)
- (United States) LOVB Salt Lake (2024-)
