= Chahla Benmokhtar =

Algerian volleyball player (born 1997)

Personal information
- Nationality: Algerian
- Born: 30 December 1997 (age 28)
- Height: 179 cm (70 in)
- Weight: 53 kg (117 lb)
- Spike: 282 cm (111 in)
- Block: 270 cm (106 in)

Volleyball information
- Number: 19 (national team)

Career
Years	Teams
2015	Seddouk. VB

National team
2015	Algeria

Chahla Benmokhtar (born 30 December 1997) is an Algerian female volleyball player. She was part of the Algeria women's national volleyball team.

She participated in the 2015 FIVB Volleyball World Grand Prix. On club level she played for Seddouk. VB in 2015.
