= Everlyne Makuto =

Kenyan volleyball player (born 1990)

Personal information
- Nationality: Kenyan
- Born: 25 August 1990 (age 36)
- Height: 1.81 m (5 ft 11 in)
- Weight: 75 kg (165 lb)
- Spike: 305 cm (120 in)
- Block: 275 cm (108 in)

Volleyball information
- Current club: (France) VBC Chamalières
- Number: 2

Career
- Years: Team
- 2010: Kenya Prisons

National team
- Years: Team
- 2010: Kenya

Everlyne Makuto (born 25 August 1990) is a Kenyan female volleyball player. She was part of the Kenya women's national volleyball team, but she was not named for the African Games in 2019.

She participated in the 2010 FIVB Volleyball Women's World Championship. and 2015 FIVB World Grand Prix.

She plays with VBC Chamalières.

== Clubs ==
- Kenya Prisons (2010)
- (France) VBC Chamalières (2015–2016)
- Kenya Prisons (2017)
