= Amira Sadi =

Algerian volleyball player (born 1994)

Personal information
- Nationality: Algerian
- Born: 10 September 1994 (age 32)
- Height: 187 cm (74 in)
- Weight: 70 kg (154 lb)
- Spike: 280 cm (110 in)
- Block: 273 cm (107 in)

Volleyball information
- Number: 15 (national team)

Career
Years	Teams
2015	RIJA

National team
2015	Algeria

Amira Sadi (born 10 September 1994) is an Algerian female volleyball player. She was part of the Algeria women's national volleyball team.

She participated in the 2015 FIVB Volleyball World Grand Prix. On club level she played for RIJA in 2015.
