= Melissa Kasri =

Algerian volleyball player (born 1998)

Personal information
- Nationality: Algerian
- Born: 13 February 1998 (age 28)
- Height: 182 cm (72 in)
- Weight: 59 kg (130 lb)
- Spike: 280 cm (110 in)
- Block: 270 cm (106 in)

Volleyball information
- Number: 12 (national team)

Career
Years	Teams
2015	NCB

National team
2015	Algeria

Melissa Kasri (born 13 February 1998) is an Algerian female volleyball player. She was part of the Algeria women's national volleyball team.

She participated in the 2015 FIVB Volleyball World Grand Prix. On club level she played for NCB in 2015.
