= Susan Egoavil =

Peruvian volleyball player (born 1988)

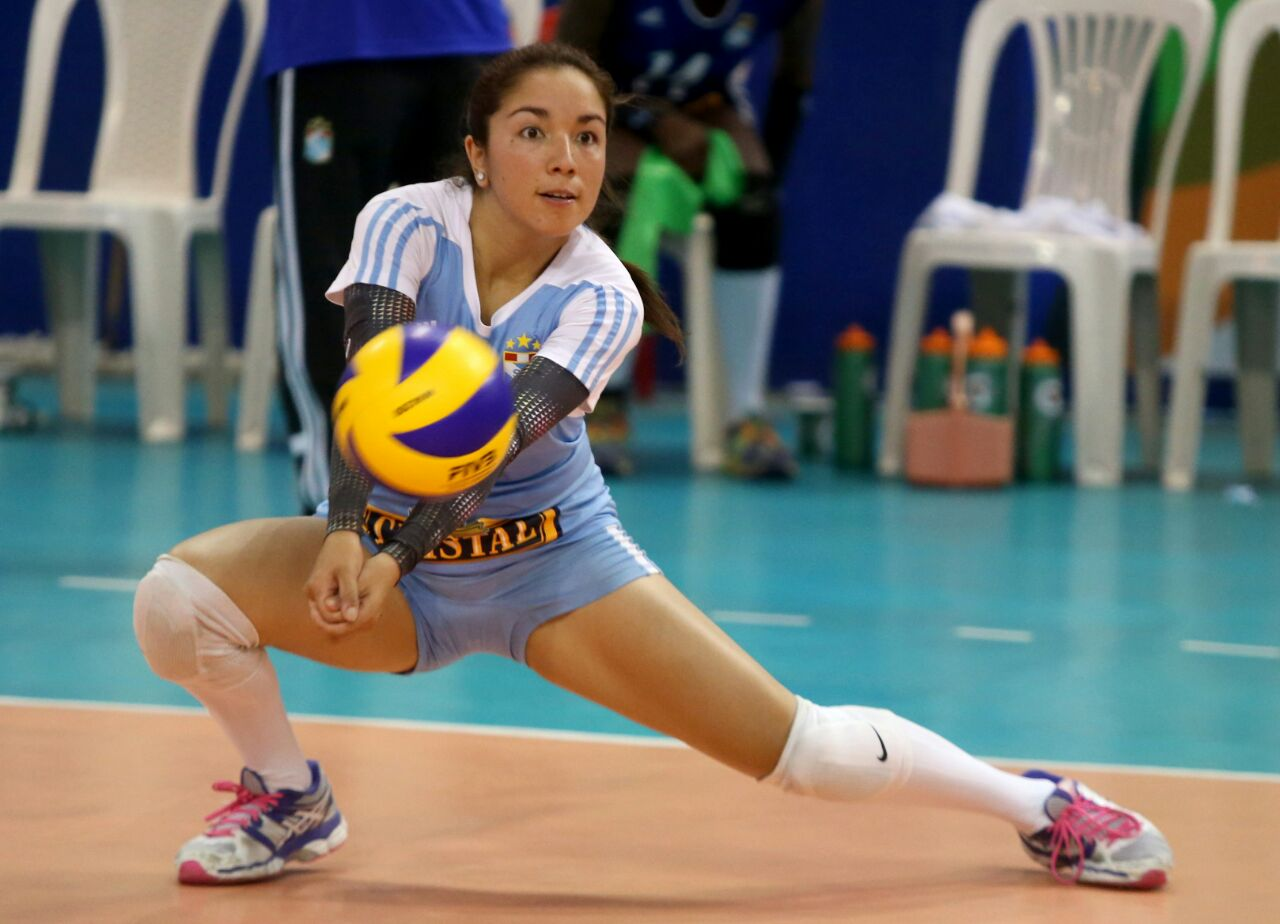

Personal information
- Nationality: Peruvian
- Born: 16 January 1988 (age 38)
- Height: 162 cm (64 in)
- Weight: 52 kg (115 lb)
- Spike: 265 cm (104 in)
- Block: 251 cm (99 in)

Volleyball information
- Position: libero
- Number: 19

Career
Years	Teams
2014	Sporting Cristal

National team
2014	Peru

Susan Egoavil (born 16 January 1988) is a Peruvian female volleyball player, playing as a libero. She is part of the Peru women's national volleyball team.

She participated in the 2015 FIVB Volleyball World Grand Prix. On club level she played for Sporting Cristal in 2014.
