= Yamila Hernández =

Cuban volleyball player (born 1992)

Personal information
- Full name: Yamila Hernández Santas
- Nationality: Cuban
- Born: 8 November 1992 (age 33)
- Height: 1.82 m (6 ft 0 in)
- Weight: 69 kg (152 lb)
- Spike: 301 cm (119 in)
- Block: 285 cm (112 in)

Volleyball information

Career
- Years: Team
- 2014: La Habana

Yamila Hernández (born 8 November 1992) is a Cuban female volleyball player. She is a member of the Cuba women's national volleyball team and played for La Habana in 2014. She was part of the Cuban national team at the 2014 FIVB Volleyball Women's World Championship in Italy.

== Clubs ==
- (Cuba) La Habana (2014)
