= Natalia Aispurúa =

Argentine volleyball player (born 1991)

Natalia Aispurua

Personal information
- Nationality: Argentine
- Born: 20 December 1991 (age 34)
- Height: 192 cm (76 in)
- Weight: 78 kg (172 lb)
- Spike: 310 cm (122 in)
- Block: 293 cm (115 in)

Volleyball information
- Number: 7 (national team)

Career
Years	Teams
2014	Boca Juniors

National team
2014	Argentina

Natalia Aispurua (born 20 December 1991) is an Argentine female volleyball player. She is part of the Argentina women's national volleyball team.

She participated in the 2014 FIVB Volleyball World Grand Prix, and 2015 FIVB Volleyball World Grand Prix. At club level she played for Boca Juniors in 2014.

== Awards ==
=== Individuals ===
- 2017 Pan-American Cup "2nd Best Middle Blocker"
