= Sol Piccolo =

Argentine volleyball player (born 1996)

Personal information
- Nationality: Argentine
- Born: 11 September 1996 (age 30)
- Height: 1.88 m (6 ft 2 in)
- Weight: 74 kg (163 lb)
- Spike: 294 cm (116 in)
- Block: 282 cm (111 in)

Volleyball information
- Number: 8

Career
Years	Teams
2014	Vélez Sarsfield

National team
Argentina

Sol Piccolo (born 11 September 1996) is an Argentine volleyball player who participated with the Argentina national team.

She participated at the 2014 FIVB Volleyball Women's World Championship in Italy, and in the 2015 FIVB Volleyball World Grand Prix. She played for Vélez Sarsfield in 2014.

== Clubs ==
- (Argentina) Vélez Sarsfield (2014) (Equipo descendido)
