= Clarisa Sagardía =

Argentine female volleyball player (born 1989)

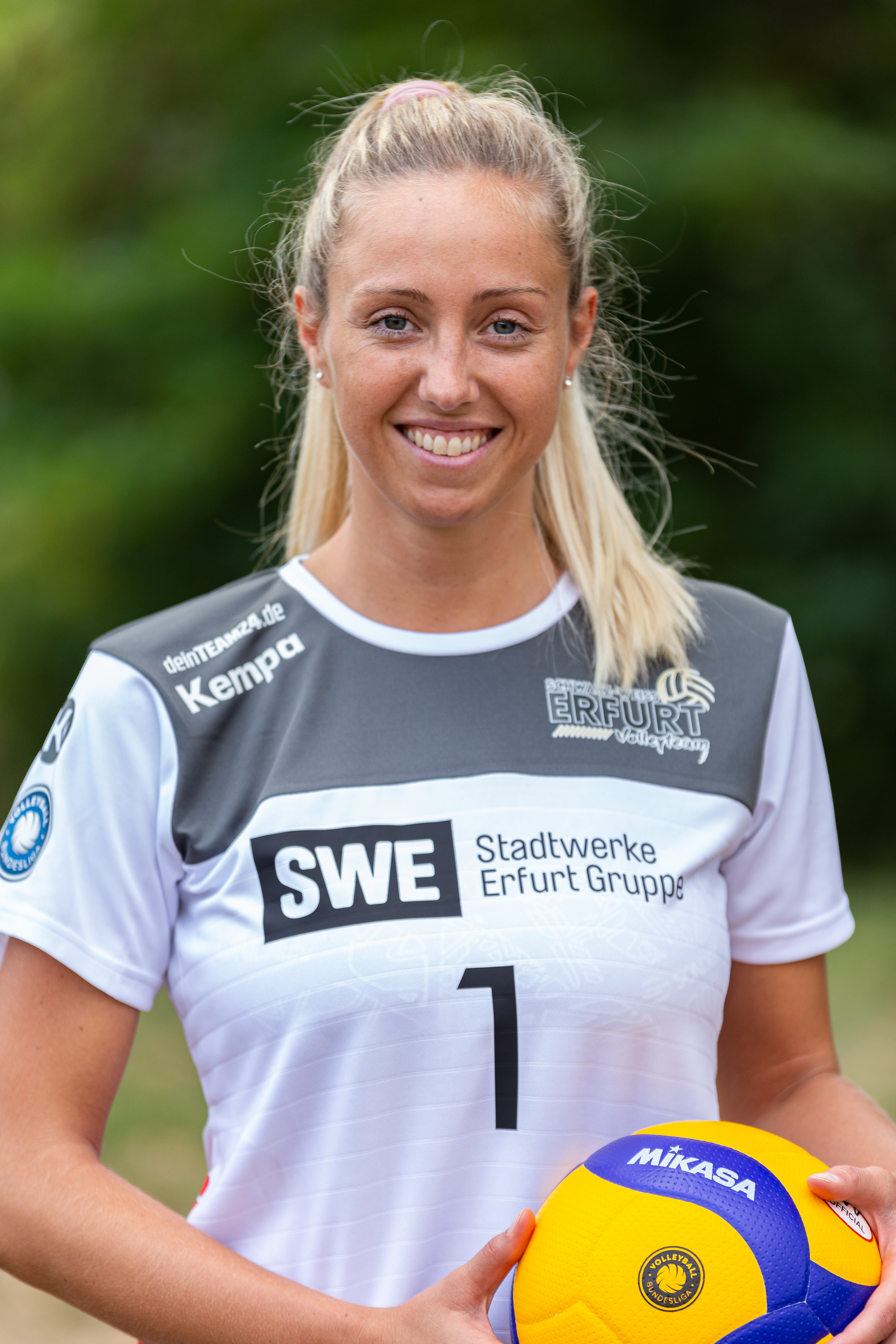
- Clarisa Sagardía in 2019

Personal information
- Nickname: Clari
- Nationality: Argentina
- Born: 29 June 1989 (age 37); Buenos Aires, Argentina
- Height: 174 cm (5 ft 9 in)
- Weight: 67 kg (148 lb)
- Spike: 290 cm (114 in)
- Block: 280 cm (110 in)

Volleyball information
- Position: Setter
- Current club: Germany Schwarz-Weis Erfurt
- Number: 9 (national team)

National team
2006–	Argentina
- Last updated: 10 January 2017

Clarisa Sagardía (born 29 June 1989 in Buenos Aires) is an Argentine volleyball player. She is part of the Argentina women's national volleyball team, having played the Women's Pan-American Volleyball Cup (in 2006, 2015, 2016), the FIVB Volleyball World Grand Prix (in 2011, 2012, 2015, 2016), the 2015 FIVB Volleyball Women's World Cup in Japan 2018 FIVB Volleyball Women's World Championship, and the 2016 Summer Olympics in Brazil.

She has also played at junior level for the Argentine national team.

At club level she played for Vélez Sarsfield, Boca Juniors, Infinita Cantabria and Club Olimpo (Bahía Blanca) before moving to Makedones Axios in September 2016.

== Clubs ==
- (Argentina) Vélez Sarsfield (2004–2006)
- (Argentina) Boca Juniors (2006–2009)
- (Spain) Infinita Cantabria (2009–2010)
- (Argentina) Boca Juniors (2010–2014)
- (Argentina) Olimpo de Bahía Blanca (2014–2015)
- (Argentina) Boca Juniors (2015–2016)
- (Greece) Makedones Axios (2016–2017)
