= Katherinne Olemar =

Peruvian volleyball player (born 1993)

Personal information
- Nationality: Peruvian
- Born: 10 May 1993 (age 33)
- Height: 176 cm (5 ft 9 in)
- Weight: 65 kg (143 lb)
- Spike: 293 cm (115 in)
- Block: 280 cm (110 in)

Career
Years	Teams
2014	Club Sporting Cristal

National team
2014	Peru

Katherinne Olemar (born 10 May 1993) is a Peruvian female volleyball player. She is part of the Peru women's national volleyball team.

She participated in the 2014 FIVB Volleyball World Grand Prix. On club level she played for Club Sporting Cristal in 2014.
