= 2017 FIVB Volleyball World Grand Prix squads =

This article shows the roster of all participating teams at the 2017 FIVB Volleyball World Grand Prix.

== Group 1 ==
=== Belgium ===
The following is the Belgian roster in the 2017 World Grand Prix.

Head coach: Gert Vande Broek

No.	Name	Date of birth	Height	Weight	Spike	Block	2016–17 club
2	Jasmien Biebauw	24 September 1990	1.80 m (5 ft 11 in)	78 kg (172 lb)	295 cm (116 in)	274 cm (108 in)	(Belgium) Asterix Kieldrecht
3	Britt Herbots	24 September 1999	1.82 m (6 ft 0 in)	63 kg (139 lb)	310 cm (120 in)	290 cm (110 in)	(Belgium) Asterix Kieldrecht
4	Valérie Courtois (L)	1 November 1990	1.71 m (5 ft 7 in)	67 kg (148 lb)	280 cm (110 in)	270 cm (110 in)	(Germany) Dresdner SC
5	Laura Heyrman	17 May 1993	1.86 m (6 ft 1 in)	74 kg (163 lb)	310 cm (120 in)	280 cm (110 in)	(Italy) Liu Jo Nordmeccanica Modena
6	Charlotte Leys (c)	18 March 1989	1.86 m (6 ft 1 in)	77 kg (170 lb)	305 cm (120 in)	293 cm (115 in)	(Turkey) Galatasaray S.K.
7	Celine Van Gestel	7 November 1997	1.83 m (6 ft 0 in)	70 kg (150 lb)	310 cm (120 in)	280 cm (110 in)	(Belgium) Asterix Kieldrecht
8	Kaja Grobelina	4 January 1995	1.88 m (6 ft 2 in)	72 kg (159 lb)	318 cm (125 in)	289 cm (114 in)	(Poland) Budowlani Łódź
9	Freya Aelbrecht	10 February 1990	1.86 m (6 ft 1 in)	82 kg (181 lb)	308 cm (121 in)	282 cm (111 in)	(Italy) Saugella Team Monza
12	Dominika Strumilo	26 December 1996	1.87 m (6 ft 2 in)	82 kg (181 lb)	308 cm (121 in)	282 cm (111 in)	(Germany) Dresdner SC
13	Marlies Janssens	4 June 1997	1.93 m (6 ft 4 in)	79 kg (174 lb)	312 cm (123 in)	299 cm (118 in)	(Belgium) VC Oudegem
14	Hélène Rousseaux	25 September 1991	1.88 m (6 ft 2 in)	72 kg (159 lb)	322 cm (127 in)	300 cm (120 in)	(Turkey) Beşiktaş
15	Margo Voets (L)	10 September 1995	1.67 m (5 ft 6 in)	68 kg (150 lb)	259 cm (102 in)	244 cm (96 in)	(Belgium) VC Oudegem
16	Elise Van Sas	1 August 1997	1.88 m (6 ft 2 in)	74 kg (163 lb)	296 cm (117 in)	281 cm (111 in)	(Belgium) VC Oudegem
17	Ilka Van de Vyver	26 January 1993	1.70 m (5 ft 7 in)	79 kg (174 lb)	296 cm (117 in)	273 cm (107 in)	(Slovenia) Calcit Ljubljana
19	Nathalie Lemmens	12 March 1995	1.92 m (6 ft 4 in)	85 kg (187 lb)	311 cm (122 in)	288 cm (113 in)	(Belgium) Asterix Kieldrecht
20	Jodie Guilliams	26 April 1997	1.80 m (5 ft 11 in)	73 kg (161 lb)	305 cm (120 in)	289 cm (114 in)	(Belgium) VC Oudegem
21	Amber De Tant	22 March 1998	1.77 m (5 ft 10 in)	66 kg (146 lb)	296 cm (117 in)	280 cm (110 in)	(Belgium) Asterix Kieldrecht
22	Lisa Neyt (L)	2 September 1993	1.75 m (5 ft 9 in)	71 kg (157 lb)	277 cm (109 in)	265 cm (104 in)	(Belgium) VDK Gent Dames
23	Iris Vandewiele	7 March 1994	1.89 m (6 ft 2 in)	71 kg (157 lb)	295 cm (116 in)	286 cm (113 in)	(Belgium) VDK Gent Dames
24	Silke Van Avermaet	2 June 1999	1.96 m (6 ft 5 in)	76 kg (168 lb)	311 cm (122 in)	290 cm (110 in)	(Belgium) Asterix Kieldrecht
27	Karolina Goliat	25 October 1996	1.90 m (6 ft 3 in)	79 kg (174 lb)	308 cm (121 in)	295 cm (116 in)	(Poland) Atom Trefl Sopot

=== Brazil ===
The following is the Brazilian roster in the 2017 World Grand Prix.

Head coach: José Roberto Guimarães

No.	Name	Date of birth	Height	Weight	Spike	Block	2016–17 club
1	Mara Leão	26 July 1991	1.88 m (6 ft 2 in)	77 kg (170 lb)	310 cm (120 in)	297 cm (117 in)	(Brazil) Camponesa Minas
2	Macris Carneiro	3 March 1989	1.78 m (5 ft 10 in)	68 kg (150 lb)	292 cm (115 in)	285 cm (112 in)	(Brazil) Terracap Brasília
3	Naiane Rios	29 November 1994	1.79 m (5 ft 10 in)	63 kg (139 lb)	276 cm (109 in)	281 cm (111 in)	(Brazil) Camponesa Minas
4	Ana Carolina da Silva	8 April 1991	1.83 m (6 ft 0 in)	73 kg (161 lb)	290 cm (110 in)	290 cm (110 in)	(Brazil) Rexona-Sesc
5	Adenízia da Silva	18 December 1986	1.85 m (6 ft 1 in)	63 kg (139 lb)	312 cm (123 in)	290 cm (110 in)	(Italy) Savino Del Bene Scandicci
6	Edinara Brancher	1 February 1996	1.86 m (6 ft 1 in)	80 kg (180 lb)	295 cm (116 in)	285 cm (112 in)	(Brazil) São Cristovão/São Caetano
7	Rosamaria Montibeller	9 April 1994	1.85 m (6 ft 1 in)	76 kg (168 lb)	291 cm (115 in)	285 cm (112 in)	(Brazil) Camponesa Minas
8	Fernanda Tomé	8 July 1989	1.95 m (6 ft 5 in)	78 kg (172 lb)	295 cm (116 in)	291 cm (115 in)	(Brazil) São Cristovão/São Caetano
9	Roberta Ratzke	28 April 1990	1.85 m (6 ft 1 in)	71 kg (157 lb)	287 cm (113 in)	278 cm (109 in)	(Brazil) Rexona-Sesc
11	Tandara Caixeta	30 October 1988	1.84 m (6 ft 0 in)	87 kg (192 lb)	305 cm (120 in)	297 cm (117 in)	(Brazil) Vôlei Nestlé
12	Natália Pereira (c)	4 April 1989	1.83 m (6 ft 0 in)	76 kg (168 lb)	300 cm (120 in)	288 cm (113 in)	(Turkey) Fenerbahçe
13	Amanda Francisco	16 August 1988	1.80 m (5 ft 11 in)	62 kg (137 lb)	304 cm (120 in)	286 cm (113 in)	(Brazil) Terracap Brasília
14	Gabriella Souza (L)	14 December 1993	1.75 m (5 ft 9 in)	69 kg (152 lb)	296 cm (117 in)	273 cm (107 in)	(Brazil) Vôlei Nestlé
15	Saraelen Lima	16 April 1994	1.84 m (6 ft 0 in)	76 kg (168 lb)	302 cm (119 in)	282 cm (111 in)	(Brazil) Vôlei Nestlé
16	Drussyla Costa	1 July 1996	1.82 m (6 ft 0 in)	73 kg (161 lb)	304 cm (120 in)	286 cm (113 in)	(Brazil) Rexona-Sesc
17	Suelen Pinto (L)	4 October 1987	1.66 m (5 ft 5 in)	81 kg (179 lb)	256 cm (101 in)	238 cm (94 in)	(Italy) Foppapedretti Bergamo
18	Juma da Silva	17 January 1993	1.79 m (5 ft 10 in)	65 kg (143 lb)	0 cm (0 in)	0 cm (0 in)	(Brazil) Vôlei Bauru
19	Léia Silva (L)	1 March 1985	1.68 m (5 ft 6 in)	60 kg (130 lb)	0 cm (0 in)	0 cm (0 in)	(Brazil) Camponesa Minas
20	Ana Beatriz Corrêa	7 February 1992	1.87 m (6 ft 2 in)	70 kg (150 lb)	298 cm (117 in)	292 cm (115 in)	(Brazil) Vôlei Nestlé
21	Monique Pavão	31 October 1986	1.78 m (5 ft 10 in)	67 kg (148 lb)	294 cm (116 in)	285 cm (112 in)	(Brazil) Rexona-Sesc
22	Valquíria Carboni	19 August 1994	1.88 m (6 ft 2 in)	72 kg (159 lb)	288 cm (113 in)	281 cm (111 in)	(Brazil) Vôlei Bauru

=== China ===
The following is the Chinese roster in the 2017 World Grand Prix.

Head coach: An Jiajie

No.	Name	Date of birth	Height	Weight	Spike	Block	2016–17 club
1	Yuan Xinyue	21 December 1996	2.01 m (6 ft 7 in)	78 kg (172 lb)	317 cm (125 in)	311 cm (122 in)	(China) Army
2	Zhu Ting (c)	29 November 1994	1.98 m (6 ft 6 in)	78 kg (172 lb)	327 cm (129 in)	300 cm (120 in)	(Turkey) Vakıfbank Sports Club
3	Li Jing	9 August 1991	1.86 m (6 ft 1 in)	73 kg (161 lb)	310 cm (120 in)	295 cm (116 in)	(China) Zhejiang
4	Qian Jingwen	11 May 1998	1.86 m (6 ft 1 in)	70 kg (150 lb)	305 cm (120 in)	297 cm (117 in)	(China) Shandong
5	Gao Yi	22 July 1998	1.93 m (6 ft 4 in)	66 kg (146 lb)	304 cm (120 in)	298 cm (117 in)	(China) Army
6	Gong Xiangyu	21 April 1997	1.86 m (6 ft 1 in)	72 kg (159 lb)	313 cm (123 in)	302 cm (119 in)	(China) Jiangsu
7	Diao Linyu	7 April 1994	1.82 m (6 ft 0 in)	69 kg (152 lb)	309 cm (122 in)	303 cm (119 in)	(China) Jiangsu
8	Yao Di	15 August 1992	1.82 m (6 ft 0 in)	65 kg (143 lb)	306 cm (120 in)	298 cm (117 in)	(China) Tianjin
9	Zhang Changning	6 November 1995	1.93 m (6 ft 4 in)	80 kg (180 lb)	315 cm (124 in)	303 cm (119 in)	(China) Jiangsu
10	Liu Xiaotong	16 February 1990	1.88 m (6 ft 2 in)	80 kg (180 lb)	312 cm (123 in)	300 cm (120 in)	(China) Beijing BAW
11	Xu Yunli	2 August 1987	1.95 m (6 ft 5 in)	85 kg (187 lb)	325 cm (128 in)	306 cm (120 in)	(China) Fujian Xi Meng Bao
12	Zheng Yixin	6 May 1995	1.87 m (6 ft 2 in)	69 kg (152 lb)	305 cm (120 in)	300 cm (120 in)	(China) Fujian Xi Meng Bao
13	Li Yingying	19 February 2000	1.92 m (6 ft 4 in)	71 kg (157 lb)	302 cm (119 in)	294 cm (116 in)	(China) Tianjin
14	Wang Chenyue	22 August 1995	1.93 m (6 ft 4 in)	75 kg (165 lb)	305 cm (120 in)	295 cm (116 in)	(China) Jiangsu
15	Lin Li (L)	5 July 1992	1.71 m (5 ft 7 in)	65 kg (143 lb)	294 cm (116 in)	294 cm (116 in)	(China) Fujian Xi Meng Bao
16	Ding Xia	13 January 1990	1.80 m (5 ft 11 in)	67 kg (148 lb)	305 cm (120 in)	300 cm (120 in)	(China) Liaoning
17	Wang Yuanyuan	14 July 1997	1.95 m (6 ft 5 in)	75 kg (165 lb)	312 cm (123 in)	300 cm (120 in)	(China) Tianjin
18	Wang Mengjie (L)	14 November 1995	1.72 m (5 ft 8 in)	65 kg (143 lb)	289 cm (114 in)	280 cm (110 in)	(China) Shandong
19	Liu Yanhan	19 January 1993	1.88 m (6 ft 2 in)	75 kg (165 lb)	315 cm (124 in)	305 cm (120 in)	(China) Army
20	Gong Meizi	17 April 1995	1.75 m (5 ft 9 in)	75 kg (165 lb)	280 cm (110 in)	270 cm (110 in)	(China) Liaoning
21	Wang Yunlu	20 May 1996	1.92 m (6 ft 4 in)	82 kg (181 lb)	310 cm (120 in)	301 cm (119 in)	(China) Army

=== Dominican Republic ===
The following is the Brazilian roster in the 2017 World Grand Prix.

Head coach: Marcos Kwiek

No.	Name	Date of birth	Height	Weight	Spike	Block	2016–17 club
1	Annerys Vargas	7 August 1981	1.96 m (6 ft 5 in)	70 kg (150 lb)	327 cm (129 in)	320 cm (130 in)	(Dominican Republic) National Team
2	Winifer Fernández (L)	6 January 1995	1.69 m (5 ft 7 in)	62 kg (137 lb)	270 cm (110 in)	265 cm (104 in)	(Dominican Republic) Cienfuegos
4	Marianne Fersola	16 January 1992	1.91 m (6 ft 3 in)	60 kg (130 lb)	315 cm (124 in)	310 cm (120 in)	(Dominican Republic) Mirador Volleyball
5	Brenda Castillo (L)	5 June 1992	1.67 m (5 ft 6 in)	55 kg (121 lb)	245 cm (96 in)	230 cm (91 in)	(Brazil) Vôlei Bauru
6	Camil Domínguez	7 December 1991	1.76 m (5 ft 9 in)	75 kg (165 lb)	232 cm (91 in)	275 cm (108 in)	(Dominican Republic) Mirador Volleyball
7	Niverka Marte	19 October 1990	1.78 m (5 ft 10 in)	71 kg (157 lb)	295 cm (116 in)	283 cm (111 in)	(Dominican Republic) Deportivo Nacional
9	Angélica Hinojosa	10 January 1997	1.86 m (6 ft 1 in)	72 kg (159 lb)	305 cm (120 in)	279 cm (110 in)	(Dominican Republic) Cienfuegos
11	Jeoselyna Rodríguez	9 December 1991	1.87 m (6 ft 2 in)	61 kg (134 lb)	320 cm (130 in)	315 cm (124 in)	(Dominican Republic) Mirador Volleyball
12	Cindy Rondón	12 November 1987	1.86 m (6 ft 1 in)	61 kg (134 lb)	320 cm (130 in)	315 cm (124 in)	(Dominican Republic) National Team
13	Erasma Moreno	25 November 1991	1.83 m (6 ft 0 in)	75 kg (165 lb)	304 cm (120 in)	289 cm (114 in)	(Puerto Rico) Capitalinas de San Juan
14	Prisilla Rivera	29 December 1984	1.83 m (6 ft 0 in)	67 kg (148 lb)	309 cm (122 in)	305 cm (120 in)	(Brazil) Vôlei Bauru
16	Yonkaira Peña	10 May 1993	1.90 m (6 ft 3 in)	70 kg (150 lb)	320 cm (130 in)	310 cm (120 in)	(Dominican Republic) Mirador Volleyball
17	Gina Mambrú	21 January 1986	1.82 m (6 ft 0 in)	65 kg (143 lb)	330 cm (130 in)	315 cm (124 in)	(Dominican Republic) Los Cachorros
18	Bethania de la Cruz (c)	13 May 1987	1.88 m (6 ft 2 in)	70 kg (150 lb)	330 cm (130 in)	320 cm (130 in)	(Russia) Dinamo Moscow
19	Ana Binet (L)	9 February 1992	1.74 m (5 ft 9 in)	58 kg (128 lb)	280 cm (110 in)	260 cm (100 in)	(Dominican Republic) Samana
20	Brayelin Martínez	11 September 1996	2.01 m (6 ft 7 in)	83 kg (183 lb)	330 cm (130 in)	320 cm (130 in)	(Italy) Busto Arsizio
21	Jineiry Martínez	3 December 1997	1.90 m (6 ft 3 in)	68 kg (150 lb)	305 cm (120 in)	280 cm (110 in)	(Dominican Republic) Mirador Volleyball
22	Gaila González	25 June 1997	1.88 m (6 ft 2 in)	73 kg (161 lb)	304 cm (120 in)	276 cm (109 in)	(Dominican Republic) Mirador Volleyball
23	Marifranchi Rodríguez	29 August 1990	1.84 m (6 ft 0 in)	68 kg (150 lb)	310 cm (120 in)	300 cm (120 in)	(Dominican Republic) Mirador Volleyball
24	Vielka Peralta	13 April 1999	1.76 m (5 ft 9 in)	56 kg (123 lb)	275 cm (108 in)	242 cm (95 in)	(Dominican Republic) Deportivo Nacional
25	Yokaty Pérez	6 August 1998	1.78 m (5 ft 10 in)	79 kg (174 lb)	291 cm (115 in)	257 cm (101 in)	(Dominican Republic) Los Cachorros

=== Italy ===
The following is the Italian roster in the 2017 World Grand Prix.

Head coach: Davide Mazzanti

No.	Name	Date of birth	Height	Weight	Spike	Block	2016–17 club
1	Indre Sorokaite	2 July 1988	1.88 m (6 ft 2 in)	80 kg (180 lb)	303 cm (119 in)	280 cm (110 in)	(Italy) Il Bisonte Firenze
2	Serena Ortolani	7 January 1987	1.87 m (6 ft 2 in)	63 kg (139 lb)	320 cm (130 in)	240 cm (94 in)	(Italy) Imoco Volley Conegliano
3	Sara Loda	22 August 1990	1.78 m (5 ft 10 in)	75 kg (165 lb)	308 cm (121 in)	287 cm (113 in)	(Italy) Savino Del Bene Scandicci
4	Sara Bonifacio	3 July 1996	1.88 m (6 ft 2 in)	76 kg (168 lb)	320 cm (130 in)	300 cm (120 in)	(Italy) Igor Gorgonzola Novara
5	Ofelia Malinov	29 February 1996	1.83 m (6 ft 0 in)	76 kg (168 lb)	306 cm (120 in)	233 cm (92 in)	(Italy) Imoco Volley Conegliano
6	Monica De Gennaro (L)	8 January 1987	1.74 m (5 ft 9 in)	67 kg (148 lb)	292 cm (115 in)	217 cm (85 in)	(Italy) Imoco Volley Conegliano
7	Raphaela Folie	7 March 1991	1.86 m (6 ft 1 in)	82 kg (181 lb)	327 cm (129 in)	237 cm (93 in)	(Italy) Imoco Volley Conegliano
8	Alessia Orro	18 July 1998	1.80 m (5 ft 11 in)	74 kg (163 lb)	308 cm (121 in)	231 cm (91 in)	(Italy) Club Italia
9	Caterina Bosetti	2 February 1994	1.79 m (5 ft 10 in)	59 kg (130 lb)	299 cm (118 in)	281 cm (111 in)	(Italy) Liu Jo Nordmeccanica Modena
10	Cristina Chirichella (c)	10 February 1994	1.95 m (6 ft 5 in)	73 kg (161 lb)	320 cm (130 in)	251 cm (99 in)	(Italy) Igor Gorgonzola Novara
11	Anna Danesi	20 April 1996	1.95 m (6 ft 5 in)	75 kg (165 lb)	312 cm (123 in)	246 cm (97 in)	(Italy) Imoco Volley Conegliano
12	Anastasia Guerra	15 October 1996	1.87 m (6 ft 2 in)	80 kg (180 lb)	314 cm (124 in)	239 cm (94 in)	(Italy) Pomì Casalmaggiore
13	Miriam Sylla	8 January 1995	1.84 m (6 ft 0 in)	80 kg (180 lb)	320 cm (130 in)	240 cm (94 in)	(Italy) Foppapedretti Bergamo
14	Valentina Tirozzi	26 March 1986	1.81 m (5 ft 11 in)	69 kg (152 lb)	304 cm (120 in)	292 cm (115 in)	(Italy) Pomì Casalmaggiore
15	Chiara De Bortolo	28 July 1997	1.80 m (5 ft 11 in)	68 kg (150 lb)	302 cm (119 in)	286 cm (113 in)	(Italy) Club Italia
16	Lucia Bosetti	9 July 1989	1.75 m (5 ft 9 in)	65 kg (143 lb)	316 cm (124 in)	286 cm (113 in)	(Italy) Pomì Casalmaggiore
17	Valentina Diouf	10 January 1993	2.02 m (6 ft 8 in)	94 kg (207 lb)	330 cm (130 in)	261 cm (103 in)	(Italy) Busto Arsizio
18	Paola Egonu	18 December 1998	1.90 m (6 ft 3 in)	70 kg (150 lb)	336 cm (132 in)	256 cm (101 in)	(Italy) Club Italia
19	Federica Stufi	22 March 1988	1.86 m (6 ft 1 in)	70 kg (150 lb)	305 cm (120 in)	278 cm (109 in)	(Italy) Busto Arsizio
20	Beatrice Parrocchiale	26 December 1995	1.68 m (5 ft 6 in)	59 kg (130 lb)	286 cm (113 in)	258 cm (102 in)	(Italy) Il Bisonte Firenze
21	Carlotta Cambi	28 May 1996	1.77 m (5 ft 10 in)	66 kg (146 lb)	302 cm (119 in)	292 cm (115 in)	(Italy) Igor Gorgonzola Novara

=== Japan ===
The following is the Japanese roster in the 2017 World Grand Prix.

Head coach: Kumi Nakada

No.	Name	Date of birth	Height	Weight	Spike	Block	2016–17 club
2	Sarina Koga	21 May 1996	1.80 m (5 ft 11 in)	66 kg (146 lb)	307 cm (121 in)	290 cm (110 in)	(Japan) NEC Red Rockets
3	Nana Iwasaka (c)	3 July 1990	1.87 m (6 ft 2 in)	76 kg (168 lb)	298 cm (117 in)	293 cm (115 in)	(Japan) Hisamitsu Springs
4	Risa Shinnabe	11 July 1990	1.73 m (5 ft 8 in)	64 kg (141 lb)	293 cm (115 in)	285 cm (112 in)	(Japan) Hisamitsu Springs
6	Haruka Miyashita	1 September 1994	1.77 m (5 ft 10 in)	61 kg (134 lb)	298 cm (117 in)	272 cm (107 in)	(Japan) Okayama Seagulls
7	Yuki Ishii	8 May 1991	1.80 m (5 ft 11 in)	68 kg (150 lb)	302 cm (119 in)	287 cm (113 in)	(Japan) Hisamitsu Springs
8	Arisa Satō (L)	18 July 1989	1.66 m (5 ft 5 in)	53 kg (117 lb)	275 cm (108 in)	266 cm (105 in)	(Japan) Hitachi Rivale
9	Haruyo Shimamura	4 March 1992	1.82 m (6 ft 0 in)	77 kg (170 lb)	305 cm (120 in)	280 cm (110 in)	(Japan) NEC Red Rockets
10	Koyomi Tominaga	1 May 1989	1.76 m (5 ft 9 in)	67 kg (148 lb)	305 cm (120 in)	280 cm (110 in)	(Japan) Ageo Medics
11	Yurie Nabeya	15 December 1993	1.76 m (5 ft 9 in)	57 kg (126 lb)	302 cm (119 in)	292 cm (115 in)	(Japan) Denso Airybees
12	Miya Sato	7 March 1990	1.74 m (5 ft 9 in)	61 kg (134 lb)	284 cm (112 in)	280 cm (110 in)	(Japan) Hitachi Rivale
13	Mai Okumura	31 October 1990	1.77 m (5 ft 10 in)	66 kg (146 lb)	297 cm (117 in)	285 cm (112 in)	(Japan) JT Marvelous
14	Ayaka Matsumoto	26 December 1988	1.88 m (6 ft 2 in)	71 kg (157 lb)	316 cm (124 in)	302 cm (119 in)	(Japan) Ageo Medics
16	Risa Ishii	19 May 1990	1.79 m (5 ft 10 in)	65 kg (143 lb)	305 cm (120 in)	277 cm (109 in)	(Japan) Denso Airybees
17	Misaki Tanaka	28 December 1991	1.73 m (5 ft 8 in)	61 kg (134 lb)	282 cm (111 in)	272 cm (107 in)	(Japan) JT Marvelous
18	Mami Uchiseto	25 October 1991	1.71 m (5 ft 7 in)	70 kg (150 lb)	296 cm (117 in)	285 cm (112 in)	(Japan) Hitachi Rivale
19	Mari Horikawa	3 May 1992	1.83 m (6 ft 0 in)	70 kg (150 lb)	302 cm (119 in)	288 cm (113 in)	(Japan) Toray Arrows
20	Mako Kobata (L)	15 August 1992	1.64 m (5 ft 5 in)	55 kg (121 lb)	284 cm (112 in)	274 cm (108 in)	(Japan) JT Marvelous
21	Kotoe Inoue (L)	15 February 1990	1.62 m (5 ft 4 in)	53 kg (117 lb)	287 cm (113 in)	275 cm (108 in)	(Japan) JT Marvelous
23	Rika Nomoto	21 September 1991	1.80 m (5 ft 11 in)	73 kg (161 lb)	310 cm (120 in)	291 cm (115 in)	(Japan) Hisamitsu Springs
24	Mizuki Tanaka	28 January 1996	1.70 m (5 ft 7 in)	73 kg (161 lb)	296 cm (117 in)	285 cm (112 in)	(Japan) JT Marvelous
25	Saori Takahashi	9 December 1992	1.77 m (5 ft 10 in)	67 kg (148 lb)	310 cm (120 in)	290 cm (110 in)	(Japan) Toyota Auto Body Queenseis

=== Netherlands ===
The following is the Dutch roster in the 2017 World Grand Prix.

Head coach: Jamie Morrison

No.	Name	Date of birth	Height	Weight	Spike	Block	2016–17 club
1	Kirsten Knip	14 September 1992	1.75 m (5 ft 9 in)	70 kg (150 lb)	281 cm (111 in)	275 cm (108 in)	(Germany) Ladies in Black Aachen
2	Femke Stoltenborg	30 July 1991	1.89 m (6 ft 2 in)	81 kg (179 lb)	303 cm (119 in)	299 cm (118 in)	(Germany) Ladies in Black Aachen
3	Yvon Beliën	28 December 1993	1.88 m (6 ft 2 in)	81 kg (179 lb)	307 cm (121 in)	303 cm (119 in)	(Italy) Liu Jo Nordmeccanica Modena
4	Celeste Plak	26 October 1995	1.90 m (6 ft 3 in)	87 kg (192 lb)	314 cm (124 in)	302 cm (119 in)	(Italy) Igor Gorgonzola Novara
5	Robin de Kruijf	26 May 1991	1.90 m (6 ft 3 in)	87 kg (192 lb)	314 cm (124 in)	302 cm (119 in)	(Italy) Imoco Volley Conegliano
6	Maret Balkestein-Grothues (c)	16 September 1988	1.80 m (5 ft 11 in)	68 kg (150 lb)	304 cm (120 in)	285 cm (112 in)	(Turkey) Fenerbahçe
7	Jeanine Stoeten	20 November 1991	1.95 m (6 ft 5 in)	75 kg (165 lb)	308 cm (121 in)	301 cm (119 in)	(Germany) Ladies in Black Aachen
9	Myrthe Schoot (L)	29 August 1988	1.82 m (6 ft 0 in)	70 kg (150 lb)	298 cm (117 in)	286 cm (113 in)	(Germany) Dresdner SC
10	Lonneke Slöetjes	15 November 1990	1.91 m (6 ft 3 in)	76 kg (168 lb)	322 cm (127 in)	315 cm (124 in)	(Turkey) Vakıfbank Sports Club
11	Anne Buijs	2 December 1991	1.91 m (6 ft 3 in)	73 kg (161 lb)	317 cm (125 in)	299 cm (118 in)	(Brazil) Rexona-Sesc
12	Britt Bongaerts	3 November 1996	1.85 m (6 ft 1 in)	68 kg (150 lb)	296 cm (117 in)	284 cm (112 in)	(Germany) USC Münster
13	Sarah Van Aalen	21 January 2000	1.83 m (6 ft 0 in)	68 kg (150 lb)	300 cm (120 in)	293 cm (115 in)	(Netherlands) Talent Team Papendal/Arnhem
14	Laura Dijkema	8 January 1995	1.84 m (6 ft 0 in)	70 kg (150 lb)	293 cm (115 in)	279 cm (110 in)	(Italy) Igor Gorgonzola Novara
16	Debby Stam (L)	24 July 1984	1.84 m (6 ft 0 in)	69 kg (152 lb)	303 cm (119 in)	281 cm (111 in)	
17	Nicole Oude Luttikhuis	26 December 1997	1.91 m (6 ft 3 in)	74 kg (163 lb)	298 cm (117 in)	287 cm (113 in)	(Germany) Ladies in Black Aachen
18	Marrit Jasper	28 February 1996	1.80 m (5 ft 11 in)	75 kg (165 lb)	300 cm (120 in)	285 cm (112 in)	(Germany) VfB Suhl
19	Nika Daalderop	29 November 1998	1.89 m (6 ft 2 in)	72 kg (159 lb)	317 cm (125 in)	308 cm (121 in)	(Germany) Ladies in Black Aachen
20	Tessa Polder	10 October 1997	1.89 m (6 ft 2 in)	76 kg (168 lb)	301 cm (119 in)	293 cm (115 in)	(Germany) Ladies in Black Aachen
21	Laura De Zwart	19 March 1999	1.98 m (6 ft 6 in)	84 kg (185 lb)	325 cm (128 in)	314 cm (124 in)	(Netherlands) Talent Team Papendal/Arnhem
22	Nicole Koolhaas	31 January 1991	1.98 m (6 ft 6 in)	77 kg (170 lb)	310 cm (120 in)	300 cm (120 in)	(Romania) CSM București
26	Dagmar Boom	1 May 2000	1.81 m (5 ft 11 in)	69 kg (152 lb)	296 cm (117 in)	291 cm (115 in)	(Netherlands) Talent Team Papendal/Arnhem

=== Russia ===
The following is the Russian roster in the 2017 World Grand Prix.

Head coach: Vladimir Kuziutkin

No.	Name	Date of birth	Height	Weight	Spike	Block	2016–17 club
1	Yana Shcherban	6 September 1989	1.85 m (6 ft 1 in)	71 kg (157 lb)	298 cm (117 in)	294 cm (116 in)	(Russia) Dinamo Moscow
2	Mariia Frolova	1 November 1986	1.78 m (5 ft 10 in)	62 kg (137 lb)	297 cm (117 in)	289 cm (114 in)	(Russia) VC Yenisey Krasnoyarsk
3	Irina Filishtinskaia	14 June 1990	1.70 m (5 ft 7 in)	65 kg (143 lb)	285 cm (112 in)	275 cm (108 in)	(Russia) Dinamo Kazan
4	Daria Malygina	4 April 1994	2.02 m (6 ft 8 in)	82 kg (181 lb)	317 cm (125 in)	305 cm (120 in)	(Russia) VC Zarechie Odintsovo
5	Julia Kutyukova	30 March 1989	1.83 m (6 ft 0 in)	74 kg (163 lb)	0 cm (0 in)	299 cm (118 in)	(Russia) Leningradka Saint Petersburg
6	Irina Zaryazhko	4 October 1991	1.96 m (6 ft 5 in)	78 kg (172 lb)	305 cm (120 in)	290 cm (110 in)	(Russia) Dinamo Kazan
7	Anna Lazareva	31 January 1997	1.90 m (6 ft 3 in)	67 kg (148 lb)	315 cm (124 in)	300 cm (120 in)	(Russia) Dinamo Moscow
9	Vera Ulyakina	21 August 1986	1.80 m (5 ft 11 in)	73 kg (161 lb)	298 cm (117 in)	293 cm (115 in)	(Russia) Dinamo Moscow
10	Ekaterina Petrova	27 November 1993	1.91 m (6 ft 3 in)	72 kg (159 lb)	312 cm (123 in)	305 cm (120 in)	(Russia) Leningradka Saint Petersburg
11	Ekaterina Tretyakova	19 October 1984	1.76 m (5 ft 9 in)	65 kg (143 lb)	301 cm (119 in)	292 cm (115 in)	(Russia) Leningradka Saint Petersburg
12	Alla Galkina (L)	15 April 1992	1.78 m (5 ft 10 in)	65 kg (143 lb)	295 cm (116 in)	290 cm (110 in)	(Russia) VC Yenisey Krasnoyarsk
13	Yevgeniya Startseva (c)	12 February 1989	1.85 m (6 ft 1 in)	68 kg (150 lb)	294 cm (116 in)	290 cm (110 in)	(Russia) Dinamo Kazan
14	Irina Fetisova	7 September 1994	1.90 m (6 ft 3 in)	76 kg (168 lb)	307 cm (121 in)	286 cm (113 in)	(Russia) Dinamo Moscow
16	Irina Voronkova	20 October 1995	1.90 m (6 ft 3 in)	84 kg (185 lb)	305 cm (120 in)	290 cm (110 in)	(Russia) Dinamo Kazan
17	Ekaterina Polyakova	6 February 1987	1.95 m (6 ft 5 in)	70 kg (150 lb)	303 cm (119 in)	297 cm (117 in)	(Russia) Leningradka Saint Petersburg
18	Kseniia Ilchenko	31 October 1994	1.83 m (6 ft 0 in)	64 kg (141 lb)	300 cm (120 in)	286 cm (113 in)	(Russia) VC Uralochka-NTMK
19	Ekaterina Evdokimova	10 September 1994	1.90 m (6 ft 3 in)	73 kg (161 lb)	306 cm (120 in)	285 cm (112 in)	(Russia) VC Uralochka-NTMK
20	Angelina Sperskaite	11 February 1997	1.88 m (6 ft 2 in)	72 kg (159 lb)	305 cm (120 in)	295 cm (116 in)	(Russia) VC Zarechie Odintsovo
21	Ekaterina Efimova	3 July 1993	1.92 m (6 ft 4 in)	70 kg (150 lb)	305 cm (120 in)	295 cm (116 in)	(Russia) VC Yenisey Krasnoyarsk
22	Tatiana Romanova	9 September 1994	1.78 m (5 ft 10 in)	64 kg (141 lb)	292 cm (115 in)	285 cm (112 in)	(Russia) VC Zarechie Odintsovo

=== Serbia ===
The following is the Serbian roster in the 2017 World Grand Prix.

Head coach: Zoran Terzić

No.	Name	Date of birth	Height	Weight	Spike	Block	2016–17 club
1	Bianka Buša	25 July 1994	1.87 m (6 ft 2 in)	74 kg (163 lb)	293 cm (115 in)	282 cm (111 in)	(Italy) Metalleghe Montichiari
2	Sara Lozo	29 April 1997	1.86 m (6 ft 1 in)	61 kg (134 lb)	295 cm (116 in)	290 cm (110 in)	(Serbia) OK Vizura
3	Sanja Malagurski	8 June 1990	1.93 m (6 ft 4 in)	74 kg (163 lb)	305 cm (120 in)	295 cm (116 in)	(Italy) Metalleghe Montichiari
4	Bojana Živković	29 March 1988	1.86 m (6 ft 1 in)	72 kg (159 lb)	300 cm (120 in)	292 cm (115 in)	(Switzerland) Voléro Zürich
5	Mina Popović	16 September 1994	1.87 m (6 ft 2 in)	73 kg (161 lb)	315 cm (124 in)	305 cm (120 in)	(Italy) Foppapedretti Bergamo
6	Tijana Malešević	18 March 1991	1.85 m (6 ft 1 in)	78 kg (172 lb)	300 cm (120 in)	286 cm (113 in)	(Brazil) Vôlei Nestlé
7	Ana Antonijević	26 August 1987	1.85 m (6 ft 1 in)	71 kg (157 lb)	282 cm (111 in)	269 cm (106 in)	(Romania) CS Volei Alba-Blaj
8	Danica Radenković	9 October 1992	1.85 m (6 ft 1 in)	70 kg (150 lb)	300 cm (120 in)	294 cm (116 in)	(Azerbaijan) Azerrail Baku
9	Brankica Mihajlović	8 October 1991	1.90 m (6 ft 3 in)	83 kg (183 lb)	302 cm (119 in)	290 cm (110 in)	(China) Tianjin Volleyball
10	Slađana Mirković	8 October 1995	1.85 m (6 ft 1 in)	78 kg (172 lb)	293 cm (115 in)	282 cm (111 in)	(Serbia) Dinamo Pančevo
11	Stefana Veljković	9 January 1990	1.90 m (6 ft 3 in)	76 kg (168 lb)	320 cm (130 in)	305 cm (120 in)	(Poland) KPS Chemik Police
12	Teodora Pušić (L)	12 March 1993	1.70 m (5 ft 7 in)	58 kg (128 lb)	270 cm (110 in)	260 cm (100 in)	(Serbia) OK Vizura
13	Ana Bjelica	3 April 1992	1.90 m (6 ft 3 in)	78 kg (172 lb)	310 cm (120 in)	305 cm (120 in)	(Brazil) Vôlei Nestlé
14	Nađa Ninković	1 November 1991	1.93 m (6 ft 4 in)	77 kg (170 lb)	307 cm (121 in)	298 cm (117 in)	(Romania) CS Volei Alba-Blaj
15	Jovana Stevanović	30 June 1992	1.92 m (6 ft 4 in)	72 kg (159 lb)	308 cm (121 in)	295 cm (116 in)	(Italy) Pomi Casalmaggiore
16	Milena Rašić (c)	25 October 1990	1.91 m (6 ft 3 in)	72 kg (159 lb)	315 cm (124 in)	310 cm (120 in)	(Turkey) Vakıfbank Sports Club
17	Silvija Popović (L)	15 March 1986	1.78 m (5 ft 10 in)	65 kg (143 lb)	286 cm (113 in)	276 cm (109 in)	(Switzerland) Voléro Zürich
18	Tijana Bošković	8 March 1997	1.93 m (6 ft 4 in)	82 kg (181 lb)	310 cm (120 in)	300 cm (120 in)	(Turkey) Eczacıbaşı VitrA
19	Bojana Milenković	6 March 1997	1.85 m (6 ft 1 in)	70 kg (150 lb)	294 cm (116 in)	288 cm (113 in)	(Serbia) OK Crvena Zvezda
20	Jelena Blagojević	1 December 1988	1.81 m (5 ft 11 in)	68 kg (150 lb)	267 cm (105 in)	242 cm (95 in)	(Poland) KPS Chemik Police
21	Ana Lazarević	4 July 1991	1.86 m (6 ft 1 in)	74 kg (163 lb)	280 cm (110 in)	268 cm (106 in)	(Greece) Olympiakos

=== Thailand ===
The following is the Thai roster in the 2017 World Grand Prix.

Head coach: Danai Sriwatcharamethakul

No.	Name	Date of birth	Height	Weight	Spike	Block	2016–17 club
1	Wipawee Srithong	28 January 1999	1.74 m (5 ft 9 in)	65 kg (143 lb)	288 cm (9 ft 5 in)	266 cm (8 ft 9 in)	(Thailand) Supreme Chonburi
2	Piyanut Pannoy	10 November 1989	1.71 m (5 ft 7 in)	62 kg (137 lb)	280 cm (9 ft 2 in)	275 cm (9 ft 0 in)	(Thailand) Supreme Chonburi
3	Pornpun Guedpard	5 May 1993	1.70 m (5 ft 7 in)	63 kg (139 lb)	288 cm (9 ft 5 in)	279 cm (9 ft 2 in)	(Thailand) Bangkok Glass
4	Thatdao Nuekjang	3 February 1994	1.84 m (6 ft 0 in)	72 kg (159 lb)	308 cm (10 ft 1 in)	296 cm (9 ft 9 in)	(Thailand) Khonkaen Star
5	Pleumjit Thinkaow (c)	9 November 1983	1.80 m (5 ft 11 in)	67 kg (148 lb)	303 cm (9 ft 11 in)	283 cm (9 ft 3 in)	(Thailand) Bangkok Glass
6	Onuma Sittirak	13 June 1986	1.75 m (5 ft 9 in)	72 kg (159 lb)	304 cm (10 ft 0 in)	285 cm (9 ft 4 in)	(Japan) JT Marvelous
7	Hattaya Bamrungsuk	12 August 1993	1.80 m (5 ft 11 in)	71 kg (157 lb)	292 cm (9 ft 7 in)	282 cm (9 ft 3 in)	(Thailand) Nakhon Ratchasima
8	Yupa Sanitklang	14 August 1991	1.66 m (5 ft 5 in)	55 kg (121 lb)	275 cm (9 ft 0 in)	260 cm (8 ft 6 in)	(Thailand) Nakhon Ratchasima
9	Jarasporn Bundasak	1 March 1993	1.81 m (5 ft 11 in)	65 kg (143 lb)	291 cm (9 ft 7 in)	283 cm (9 ft 3 in)	(Thailand) Bangkok Glass
10	Wilavan Apinyapong	6 June 1984	1.74 m (5 ft 9 in)	70 kg (150 lb)	294 cm (9 ft 8 in)	282 cm (9 ft 3 in)	(Thailand) Supreme Chonburi
11	Soraya Phomla	6 August 1992	1.69 m (5 ft 7 in)	60 kg (130 lb)	280 cm (9 ft 2 in)	270 cm (8 ft 10 in)	(Thailand) Supreme Chonburi
12	Tapaphaipun Chaisri	29 November 1989	1.68 m (5 ft 6 in)	70 kg (150 lb)	295 cm (9 ft 8 in)	276 cm (9 ft 1 in)	(Thailand) Thai-Denmark Nongrua
13	Nootsara Tomkom	7 July 1985	1.69 m (5 ft 7 in)	57 kg (126 lb)	289 cm (9 ft 6 in)	278 cm (9 ft 1 in)	(Turkey) Fenerbahçe
14	Chitaporn Kamlangmak	17 March 1996	1.84 m (6 ft 0 in)	74 kg (163 lb)	290 cm (9 ft 6 in)	282 cm (9 ft 3 in)	(Thailand) Khonkaen Star
15	Malika Kanthong	8 January 1987	1.78 m (5 ft 10 in)	65 kg (143 lb)	292 cm (9 ft 7 in)	278 cm (9 ft 1 in)	(Azerbaijan) Azerrail Baku
16	Pimpichaya Kokram	16 June 1998	1.78 m (5 ft 10 in)	62 kg (137 lb)	293 cm (9 ft 7 in)	283 cm (9 ft 3 in)	(Thailand) 3BB Nakornnont
17	Tichaya Boonlert	14 February 1997	1.79 m (5 ft 10 in)	64 kg (141 lb)	293 cm (9 ft 7 in)	284 cm (9 ft 4 in)	(Thailand) 3BB Nakornnont
18	Ajcharaporn Kongyot	18 June 1995	1.78 m (5 ft 10 in)	65 kg (143 lb)	298 cm (9 ft 9 in)	287 cm (9 ft 5 in)	(Thailand) Supreme Chonburi
19	Chatchu-on Moksri	6 November 1999	1.78 m (5 ft 10 in)	58 kg (128 lb)	298 cm (9 ft 9 in)	290 cm (9 ft 6 in)	(Thailand) Nakhon Ratchasima
20	Supattra Pairoj	27 June 1990	1.60 m (5 ft 3 in)	58 kg (128 lb)	275 cm (9 ft 0 in)	265 cm (8 ft 8 in)	(Thailand) Supreme Chonburi
21	Hathairat Jarat	9 February 1996	1.82 m (6 ft 0 in)	65 kg (143 lb)	286 cm (9 ft 5 in)	277 cm (9 ft 1 in)	(Thailand) Thai-Denmark Nongrua

=== Turkey ===
The following is the Turkish roster in the 2017 World Grand Prix.

Head coach: Giovanni Guidetti

No.	Name	Date of birth	Height	Weight	Spike	Block	2016–17 club
1	Hatice Gizem Örge (L)	26 April 1993	1.70 m (5 ft 7 in)	59 kg (130 lb)	270 cm (110 in)	260 cm (100 in)	(Turkey) Vakıfbank Sports Club
2	Simge Şebnem Aköz	23 April 1991	1.68 m (5 ft 6 in)	55 kg (121 lb)	250 cm (98 in)	245 cm (96 in)	(Turkey) Eczacıbaşı VitrA
3	Şeyma Ercan	5 July 1994	1.87 m (6 ft 2 in)	75 kg (165 lb)	302 cm (119 in)	295 cm (116 in)	(Turkey) Fenerbahçe
4	Gamze Alikaya	1 January 1993	1.79 m (5 ft 10 in)	68 kg (150 lb)	300 cm (120 in)	280 cm (110 in)	(Turkey) Galatasaray S.K.
5	Kübra Akman	13 October 1994	1.97 m (6 ft 6 in)	89 kg (196 lb)	310 cm (120 in)	300 cm (120 in)	(Turkey) Vakıfbank Sports Club
6	Polen Uslupehlivan	27 August 1990	1.93 m (6 ft 4 in)	65 kg (143 lb)	320 cm (130 in)	310 cm (120 in)	(Turkey) Fenerbahçe
7	Aslı Kalaç	13 December 1995	1.83 m (6 ft 0 in)	73 kg (161 lb)	310 cm (120 in)	300 cm (120 in)	(Turkey) Galatasaray S.K.
8	Bahar Toksoy	6 February 1988	1.90 m (6 ft 3 in)	80 kg (180 lb)	315 cm (124 in)	310 cm (120 in)	(Turkey) Fenerbahçe
9	Meliha İsmailoğlu	17 September 1993	1.88 m (6 ft 2 in)	70 kg (150 lb)	310 cm (120 in)	301 cm (119 in)	(Turkey) Fenerbahçe
10	Ezgi Dilik	12 June 1995	1.70 m (5 ft 7 in)	60 kg (130 lb)	282 cm (111 in)	287 cm (113 in)	(Turkey) Fenerbahçe
11	Melis Yılmaz (L)	28 June 1997	1.65 m (5 ft 5 in)	52 kg (115 lb)	260 cm (100 in)	259 cm (102 in)	(Turkey) Fenerbahçe
12	Gözde Yılmaz	9 September 1991	1.95 m (6 ft 5 in)	82 kg (181 lb)	315 cm (124 in)	310 cm (120 in)	(Turkey) Eczacıbaşı VitrA
13	Melis Durul	21 October 1993	1.85 m (6 ft 1 in)	74 kg (163 lb)	310 cm (120 in)	300 cm (120 in)	(Turkey) Vakıfbank Sports Club
14	Özgenur Yurtdagülen	6 August 1993	1.93 m (6 ft 4 in)	67 kg (148 lb)	320 cm (130 in)	310 cm (120 in)	(Turkey) Vakıfbank Sports Club
15	Hande Baladın	1 September 1997	1.89 m (6 ft 2 in)	71 kg (157 lb)	310 cm (120 in)	300 cm (120 in)	(Turkey) Eczacıbaşı VitrA
16	Çağla Akın	19 January 1995	1.77 m (5 ft 10 in)	70 kg (150 lb)	300 cm (120 in)	280 cm (110 in)	(Turkey) Beşiktaş
17	Beyza Arıcı	27 July 1995	1.92 m (6 ft 4 in)	82 kg (181 lb)	302 cm (119 in)	293 cm (115 in)	(Turkey) Eczacıbaşı VitrA
18	Dicle Nur Babat	15 September 1992	1.90 m (6 ft 3 in)	78 kg (172 lb)	300 cm (120 in)	290 cm (110 in)	(Turkey) Fenerbahçe
19	Fatma Yıldırım (c)	3 January 1990	1.79 m (5 ft 10 in)	65 kg (143 lb)	288 cm (113 in)	280 cm (110 in)	(Turkey) Bursa BB
20	Cansu Çetin	26 May 1993	1.82 m (6 ft 0 in)	70 kg (150 lb)	299 cm (118 in)	292 cm (115 in)	(Turkey) Vakıfbank Sports Club
21	Meryem Çalık	3 February 1988	1.94 m (6 ft 4 in)	63 kg (139 lb)	315 cm (124 in)	310 cm (120 in)	(Turkey) Seramiksan SK

=== United States ===
The following is the American roster in the 2017 World Grand Prix.

Head coach: Karch Kiraly

No.	Name	Date of birth	Height	Weight	Spike	Block	2016–17 club
1	Micha Hancock	10 November 1992	1.80 m (5 ft 11 in)	76 kg (168 lb)	305 cm (120 in)	297 cm (117 in)	(Poland) Impel Wrocław
2	Kristen Hahn	19 January 1992	1.65 m (5 ft 5 in)	56 kg (123 lb)	236 cm (93 in)	236 cm (93 in)	(United States) National Team
3	Carli Lloyd (c)	6 August 1989	1.80 m (5 ft 11 in)	75 kg (165 lb)	313 cm (123 in)	295 cm (116 in)	(Italy) Pomì Casalmaggiore
4	Justine Wong-Orantes	6 October 1995	1.68 m (5 ft 6 in)	66 kg (146 lb)	282 cm (111 in)	277 cm (109 in)	(United States) National Team
5	Sarah Wilhite	30 July 1995	1.85 m (6 ft 1 in)	75 kg (165 lb)	305 cm (120 in)	300 cm (120 in)	(United States) National Team
6	TeTori Dixon	4 August 1992	1.91 m (6 ft 3 in)	83 kg (183 lb)	306 cm (120 in)	295 cm (116 in)	(United States) National Team
7	Lauren Carlini	28 February 1995	1.85 m (6 ft 1 in)	77 kg (170 lb)	302 cm (119 in)	295 cm (116 in)	(United States) National Team
8	Lauren Gibbemeyer	8 September 1988	1.87 m (6 ft 2 in)	71 kg (157 lb)	307 cm (121 in)	293 cm (115 in)	(Italy) Pomì Casalmaggiore
9	Madison Kingdon	20 April 1993	1.83 m (6 ft 0 in)	78 kg (172 lb)	307 cm (121 in)	293 cm (115 in)	(South Korea) Hwaseong IBK Altos
11	Andrea Drews	25 December 1993	1.91 m (6 ft 3 in)	77 kg (170 lb)	312 cm (123 in)	312 cm (123 in)	(Puerto Rico) Criollas de Caguas
12	Kelly Murphy	6 August 1989	1.88 m (6 ft 2 in)	79 kg (174 lb)	315 cm (124 in)	307 cm (121 in)	(China) Henan VB Club
14	Michelle Bartsch-Hackley	12 February 1988	1.90 m (6 ft 3 in)	78 kg (172 lb)	305 cm (120 in)	296 cm (117 in)	(Italy) Südtirol Bolzano
16	Molly McCage	2 February 1994	1.91 m (6 ft 3 in)	75 kg (165 lb)	321 cm (126 in)	304 cm (120 in)	(Germany) VC Wiesbaden
17	Megan Courtney	27 October 1993	1.85 m (6 ft 1 in)	61 kg (134 lb)	315 cm (124 in)	300 cm (120 in)	(Poland) Impel Wrocław
18	Sonja Newcombe	7 March 1988	1.82 m (6 ft 0 in)	70 kg (150 lb)	305 cm (120 in)	300 cm (120 in)	(China) Sichuan
19	Hannah Tapp	21 June 1995	1.91 m (6 ft 3 in)	77 kg (170 lb)	297 cm (117 in)	290 cm (110 in)	(Germany) Schweriner SC
20	Amanda Benson (L)	1 March 1995	1.69 m (5 ft 7 in)	63 kg (139 lb)	265 cm (104 in)	257 cm (101 in)	(United States) National Team
21	Paige Tapp	21 June 1995	1.92 m (6 ft 4 in)	77 kg (170 lb)	295 cm (116 in)	280 cm (110 in)	(Puerto Rico) Valencianas de Juncos
22	Alexa Dannemiller	9 June 1993	1.80 m (5 ft 11 in)	77 kg (170 lb)	295 cm (116 in)	280 cm (110 in)	(Germany) Schweriner SC
23	Elizabeth McMahon	27 February 1993	1.97 m (6 ft 6 in)	70 kg (150 lb)	308 cm (121 in)	295 cm (116 in)	(Germany) Dresdner SC
26	Amber Rolfzen	25 August 1994	1.91 m (6 ft 3 in)	73 kg (161 lb)	296 cm (117 in)	290 cm (110 in)	(Germany) Dresdner SC

== Group 2 ==
=== Argentina ===
The following is the Argentine roster in the 2017 World Grand Prix.

Head coach: Guillermo Orduna

No.	Name	Date of birth	Height	Weight	Spike	Block	2016–17 club
1	Priscila Bosio	11 March 1994	1.82 m (6 ft 0 in)	72 kg (159 lb)	292 cm (115 in)	275 cm (108 in)	(Argentina) GELP
2	Tanya Acosta	11 March 1991	1.82 m (6 ft 0 in)	70 kg (150 lb)	287 cm (113 in)	280 cm (110 in)	(Brazil) Esporte Clube Pinheiros
3	Yamila Nizetich	27 January 1989	1.81 m (5 ft 11 in)	74 kg (163 lb)	305 cm (120 in)	295 cm (116 in)	(Turkey) Nilüfer
4	Martina Guastavino	18 July 1995	1.80 m (5 ft 11 in)	70 kg (150 lb)	285 cm (112 in)	275 cm (108 in)	(Argentina) River Plate
5	Lucía Fresco	14 May 1995	1.95 m (6 ft 5 in)	92 kg (203 lb)	304 cm (120 in)	290 cm (110 in)	(Greece) Pannaxiakos V.C.
6	Elina Rodríguez	11 February 1997	1.89 m (6 ft 2 in)	72 kg (159 lb)	300 cm (120 in)	284 cm (112 in)	(Argentina) San Lorenzo de Almagro
7	Natalia Aispurúa	20 December 1991	1.92 m (6 ft 4 in)	78 kg (172 lb)	310 cm (120 in)	293 cm (115 in)	(Argentina) River Plate
8	Sol Piccolo	11 September 1996	1.84 m (6 ft 0 in)	74 kg (163 lb)	294 cm (116 in)	282 cm (111 in)	(Argentina) Club Atlético Vélez Sarsfield
9	Clarisa Sagardía	29 June 1989	1.74 m (5 ft 9 in)	67 kg (148 lb)	290 cm (110 in)	280 cm (110 in)	(Argentina) Boca Juniors
10	Emilce Sosa (c)	11 September 1987	1.77 m (5 ft 10 in)	72 kg (159 lb)	305 cm (120 in)	295 cm (116 in)	(Brazil) Esporte Clube Pinheiros
11	Julieta Lazcano	25 June 1989	1.90 m (6 ft 3 in)	74 kg (163 lb)	312 cm (123 in)	293 cm (115 in)	(France) Saint-Cloud Paris Stade
12	Tatiana Rizzo (L)	30 December 1986	1.78 m (5 ft 10 in)	64 kg (141 lb)	280 cm (110 in)	268 cm (106 in)	(Brazil) Rio do Sul
13	Sofía Bulgarella	30 June 1993	1.70 m (5 ft 7 in)	68 kg (150 lb)	289 cm (114 in)	270 cm (110 in)	(Argentina) Estudiantes de La Plata
14	Florencia Giorgi	10 October 1995	1.80 m (5 ft 11 in)	65 kg (143 lb)	290 cm (110 in)	278 cm (109 in)	(Argentina) Union Oncativo
15	Antonela Fortuna (L)	10 May 1995	1.75 m (5 ft 9 in)	61 kg (134 lb)	285 cm (112 in)	275 cm (108 in)	(Argentina) Central San Carlos
17	Helena Vidal	6 January 1989	1.86 m (6 ft 1 in)	71 kg (157 lb)	300 cm (120 in)	293 cm (115 in)	(Italy) Pavia Volley
18	Barbara Frangella	17 February 1996	1.79 m (5 ft 10 in)	68 kg (150 lb)	289 cm (114 in)	280 cm (110 in)	(Argentina) Boca Juniors
19	Morena Martínez Franchi (L)	19 February 1993	1.64 m (5 ft 5 in)	62 kg (137 lb)	285 cm (112 in)	264 cm (104 in)	(Argentina) Club Atlético Vélez Sarsfield
20	Mariana Moriondo	2 December 1995	1.73 m (5 ft 8 in)	69 kg (152 lb)	268 cm (106 in)	260 cm (100 in)	(Argentina) San Lorenzo de Almagro
21	Karina Suligoy	14 December 1988	1.72 m (5 ft 8 in)	67 kg (148 lb)	294 cm (116 in)	285 cm (112 in)	(Argentina) Club Atlético Villa Dora
22	Camila Hiruela Tapia	1 February 1997	1.76 m (5 ft 9 in)	77 kg (170 lb)	287 cm (113 in)	280 cm (110 in)	(Argentina) Sociedad Española

=== Bulgaria ===
The following is the Bulgarian roster in the 2017 World Grand Prix.

Head coach: Ivan Dimitrov

No.	Name	Date of birth	Height	Weight	Spike	Block	2016–17 club
1	Gergana Dimitrova	28 February 1996	1.84 m (6 ft 0 in)	71 kg (157 lb)	305 cm (120 in)	288 cm (113 in)	(France) RC Cannes
2	Yuliya Stoyanova	22 July 1985	1.85 m (6 ft 1 in)	64 kg (141 lb)	305 cm (120 in)	288 cm (113 in)	(France) Vandœuvre Nancy Volley-Ball
3	Rusena Slancheva	23 August 1986	1.84 m (6 ft 0 in)	62 kg (137 lb)	295 cm (116 in)	287 cm (113 in)	(France) Vandœuvre Nancy Volley-Ball
4	Nasya Dimitrova	6 November 1992	1.90 m (6 ft 3 in)	70 kg (150 lb)	305 cm (120 in)	290 cm (110 in)	(Bulgaria) Maritza Plovdiv VC
5	Dobriana Rabadžieva (c)	14 June 1991	1.94 m (6 ft 4 in)	72 kg (159 lb)	305 cm (120 in)	285 cm (112 in)	(Switzerland) Voléro Zürich
6	Miroslava Paskova	16 February 1996	1.80 m (5 ft 11 in)	67 kg (148 lb)	299 cm (118 in)	280 cm (110 in)	(Poland) KS Developres Rzeszów
7	Slavina Koleva	22 November 1986	1.84 m (6 ft 0 in)	57 kg (126 lb)	302 cm (119 in)	297 cm (117 in)	(Turkey) Karşıyaka
8	Mariya Karakasheva	27 October 1988	1.82 m (6 ft 0 in)	68 kg (150 lb)	295 cm (116 in)	290 cm (110 in)	(Bulgaria) VC CSKA Sofia
9	Petya Barakova	18 June 1994	1.80 m (5 ft 11 in)	76 kg (168 lb)	283 cm (111 in)	271 cm (107 in)	(France) Le Cannet-Rocheville
10	Elitsa Barakova	11 March 1997	1.84 m (6 ft 0 in)	60 kg (130 lb)	290 cm (110 in)	280 cm (110 in)	(France) Kazanlak Volley
11	Hristina Ruseva	1 October 1991	1.90 m (6 ft 3 in)	77 kg (170 lb)	305 cm (120 in)	290 cm (110 in)	(Turkey) Galatasaray S.K
12	Mariya Dancheva	4 December 1995	1.95 m (6 ft 5 in)	73 kg (161 lb)	314 cm (124 in)	302 cm (119 in)	(Bulgaria) Maritza Plovdiv VC
13	Mihaela Mihaylova	22 May 1999	0 m (0 in)	0 kg (0 lb)	0 cm (0 in)	0 cm (0 in)	(Bulgaria) VC CSKA Sofia
15	Kathryn Dimitrova	27 November 1999	1.90 m (6 ft 3 in)	73 kg (161 lb)	303 cm (119 in)	296 cm (117 in)	(Bulgaria) Levski Volley
16	Elitsa Vasileva	13 May 1990	1.90 m (6 ft 3 in)	73 kg (161 lb)	302 cm (119 in)	290 cm (110 in)	(Russia) Dinamo Kazan
18	Veselina Grigorova	6 September 1995	1.94 m (6 ft 4 in)	80 kg (180 lb)	303 cm (119 in)	292 cm (115 in)	(Romania) Penicilina Iași
19	Polina Neykova	7 October 1998	1.82 m (6 ft 0 in)	73 kg (161 lb)	287 cm (113 in)	280 cm (110 in)	(Bulgaria) VC CSKA Sofia
20	Kristina Guncheva	24 March 1994	1.78 m (5 ft 10 in)	61 kg (134 lb)	282 cm (111 in)	271 cm (107 in)	(Switzerland) Volley Köniz

=== Canada ===
The following is the Canadian roster in the 2017 World Grand Prix.

Head coach: Marcello Abbondanza

No.	Name	Date of birth	Height	Weight	Spike	Block	2016–17 club
2	Danielle Brisebois	12 August 1994	1.80 m (5 ft 11 in)	77 kg (170 lb)	311 cm (122 in)	301 cm (119 in)	(Canada) University of British Columbia
4	Kyla Richey	20 June 1989	1.88 m (6 ft 2 in)	83 kg (183 lb)	309 cm (122 in)	292 cm (115 in)	(Azerbaijan) Azeryol Baku
5	Danielle Smith	29 April 1990	1.78 m (5 ft 10 in)	68 kg (150 lb)	291 cm (115 in)	277 cm (109 in)	(Netherlands) Sliedrecht Sport
6	Alissa Coulter	27 October 1993	1.84 m (6 ft 0 in)	74 kg (163 lb)	301 cm (119 in)	288 cm (113 in)	(Canada) University of British Columbia
7	Brianna Beamish	4 September 1993	1.79 m (5 ft 10 in)	69 kg (152 lb)	300 cm (120 in)	286 cm (113 in)	(Canada) UBCO
8	Alicia Ogoms	2 April 1994	1.94 m (6 ft 4 in)	82 kg (181 lb)	315 cm (124 in)	305 cm (120 in)	(United States) University of Southern California
9	Alexa Lea Gray	7 August 1994	1.85 m (6 ft 1 in)	75 kg (165 lb)	323 cm (127 in)	215 cm (85 in)	(Canada) University of Calgary
10	Marisa Field	10 July 1987	1.89 m (6 ft 2 in)	71 kg (157 lb)	312 cm (123 in)	297 cm (117 in)	(Greece) Panathinaikos
11	Anna Feore	23 November 1996	1.75 m (5 ft 9 in)	63 kg (139 lb)	299 cm (118 in)	290 cm (110 in)	(Canada) University of Toronto
12	Jennifer Cross	4 July 1992	1.95 m (6 ft 5 in)	81 kg (179 lb)	315 cm (124 in)	296 cm (117 in)	(Germany) Dresdner SC
13	Lucille Charuk (c)	13 August 1989	1.88 m (6 ft 2 in)	88 kg (194 lb)	315 cm (124 in)	296 cm (117 in)	(Germany) Rote Raben Vilsbiburg
14	Elizabeth Wendel	15 December 1993	1.85 m (6 ft 1 in)	81 kg (179 lb)	310 cm (120 in)	300 cm (120 in)	(Canada) Trinity Western University
15	Sarah Chase	8 October 1997	1.85 m (6 ft 1 in)	70 kg (150 lb)	302 cm (119 in)	276 cm (109 in)	(United States) Saint Mary's Gaels
16	Shainah Joseph	15 May 1995	1.83 m (6 ft 0 in)	79 kg (174 lb)	328 cm (129 in)	318 cm (125 in)	(United States) University of Florida
17	Kristen Moncks	31 July 1992	1.73 m (5 ft 8 in)	66 kg (146 lb)	290 cm (110 in)	274 cm (108 in)	(Canada) National team
19	Marie-Alex Bélanger	13 April 1993	1.86 m (6 ft 1 in)	75 kg (165 lb)	315 cm (124 in)	295 cm (116 in)	(Canada) Université de Montréal
20	Alicia Perrin	1 June 1992	1.88 m (6 ft 2 in)	84 kg (185 lb)	305 cm (120 in)	286 cm (113 in)	(Greece) Pannaxiakos V.C.
21	Courtney Baker	14 July 1997	1.80 m (5 ft 11 in)	68 kg (150 lb)	309 cm (122 in)	290 cm (110 in)	(Canada) Dalhousie University
22	Megan Cyr	1 June 1990	1.82 m (6 ft 0 in)	75 kg (165 lb)	297 cm (117 in)	282 cm (111 in)	(Switzerland) Viteos NUC
23	Michaela Reesor	2 March 1993	1.80 m (5 ft 11 in)	66 kg (146 lb)	302 cm (119 in)	279 cm (110 in)	(Canada) National team
24	Leah Shevkenek	8 June 1995	1.79 m (5 ft 10 in)	72 kg (159 lb)	297 cm (117 in)	279 cm (110 in)	(Canada) University of Calgary

=== Colombia ===
The following is the Colombian roster in the 2017 World Grand Prix.

Head coach: Antônio Rizola Neto

No.	Name	Date of birth	Height	Weight	Spike	Block	2016–17 club
1	Paola Ampudia	5 August 1988	1.85 m (6 ft 1 in)	72 kg (159 lb)	308 cm (121 in)	303 cm (119 in)	(Colombia) Liga Vallecaucana
2	Yeisy Soto	7 April 1996	1.86 m (6 ft 1 in)	55 kg (121 lb)	295 cm (116 in)	273 cm (107 in)	(Colombia) Liga Bolivarense
3	Dayana Segovia	24 March 1996	1.84 m (6 ft 0 in)	58 kg (128 lb)	298 cm (117 in)	281 cm (111 in)	(Colombia) Liga Bolivarense
4	Melissa Montero	11 March 1997	1.72 m (5 ft 8 in)	64 kg (141 lb)	265 cm (104 in)	2,260 cm (890 in)	(Colombia) Liga Bolivarense
5	Ana Karina Olaya	13 September 2002	1.87 m (6 ft 2 in)	78 kg (172 lb)	312 cm (123 in)	297 cm (117 in)	(Colombia) Liga Vallecaucana
6	Lorena Zuleta	16 January 1981	1.92 m (6 ft 4 in)	77 kg (170 lb)	315 cm (124 in)	310 cm (120 in)	(Kazakhstan) ZHETYSU Almaty Club
7	Madelaynne Montaño	6 January 1983	1.88 m (6 ft 2 in)	70 kg (150 lb)	335 cm (132 in)	310 cm (120 in)	(Poland) KPS Chemik Police
8	Emelys Martínez	8 May 2000	1.82 m (6 ft 0 in)	60 kg (130 lb)	270 cm (110 in)	265 cm (104 in)	(Colombia) Bolívar
9	Juliana Toro	29 January 1995	1.66 m (5 ft 5 in)	65 kg (143 lb)	257 cm (101 in)	246 cm (97 in)	(Colombia) Liga Antioqueña
10	Valerin Carabalí	25 October 2000	1.83 m (6 ft 0 in)	67 kg (148 lb)	301 cm (119 in)	286 cm (113 in)	(Colombia) Liga Vallecaucana
11	Giselle Pérez	8 July 1997	1.82 m (6 ft 0 in)	65 kg (143 lb)	280 cm (110 in)	275 cm (108 in)	(Colombia) Liga Bolivarense
12	Libys Marmolejo	9 May 1992	1.86 m (6 ft 1 in)	64 kg (141 lb)	310 cm (120 in)	289 cm (114 in)	(Colombia) Liga Antioqueña
13	Camila Gómez (L)	6 July 1995	1.60 m (5 ft 3 in)	61 kg (134 lb)	263 cm (104 in)	260 cm (100 in)	(Colombia) Liga Vallecaucana
14	Angie Velásquez	13 June 2000	1.71 m (5 ft 7 in)	58 kg (128 lb)	275 cm (108 in)	264 cm (104 in)	(Colombia) Cundinamarca
15	María Alejandra Marín (c)	4 November 1995	1.80 m (5 ft 11 in)	65 kg (143 lb)	290 cm (110 in)	283 cm (111 in)	(Colombia) Liga Bolivarense
16	Melissa Rangel	16 October 1994	1.93 m (6 ft 4 in)	70 kg (150 lb)	305 cm (120 in)	300 cm (120 in)	(Colombia) Liga Bolivarense
17	María Sarmiento (L)	30 March 2000	1.65 m (5 ft 5 in)	56 kg (123 lb)	273 cm (107 in)	270 cm (110 in)	(Colombia) Liga Vallecaucana
18	María Margarita Martínez	19 May 1995	1.80 m (5 ft 11 in)	77 kg (170 lb)	305 cm (120 in)	300 cm (120 in)	(Colombia) Liga Vallecaucana
19	Amanda Coneo	20 December 1996	1.77 m (5 ft 10 in)	58 kg (128 lb)	295 cm (116 in)	280 cm (110 in)	(Italy) Sab Grima Legnano
20	Verónica Pasos	15 June 1996	1.79 m (5 ft 10 in)	71 kg (157 lb)	294 cm (116 in)	277 cm (109 in)	(Colombia) Liga Antioqueña
22	María Caraballo	21 November 1999	1.90 m (6 ft 3 in)	50 kg (110 lb)	280 cm (110 in)	265 cm (104 in)	(Colombia) Liga Bolivarense

=== Croatia ===
The following is the Croatian roster in the 2017 World Grand Prix.

Head coach: Miroslav Aksentijević

No.	Name	Date of birth	Height	Weight	Spike	Block	2016–17 club
1	Rene Sain (L)	23 April 1997	1.60 m (5 ft 3 in)	55 kg (121 lb)	271 cm (107 in)	251 cm (99 in)	(Czech Republic) VKP Olomouc
2	Ana Grbac	23 March 1988	1.86 m (6 ft 1 in)	64 kg (141 lb)	302 cm (119 in)	288 cm (113 in)	(Romania) CS Volei Alba-Blaj
3	Nikolina Božičević (L)	14 January 1995	1.60 m (5 ft 3 in)	62 kg (137 lb)	282 cm (111 in)	273 cm (107 in)	(Croatia) OK Marina Kaštela
4	Božana Butigan	19 August 2000	1.90 m (6 ft 3 in)	78 kg (172 lb)	303 cm (119 in)	294 cm (116 in)	(Croatia) HAOK Mladost
5	Astrid Popić	24 July 1998	1.87 m (6 ft 2 in)	76 kg (168 lb)	300 cm (120 in)	289 cm (114 in)	
6	Lara Štimac	18 August 2000	1.80 m (5 ft 11 in)	63 kg (139 lb)	295 cm (116 in)	285 cm (112 in)	
7	Ema Strunjak	24 September 1999	1.88 m (6 ft 2 in)	74 kg (163 lb)	301 cm (119 in)	294 cm (116 in)	
8	Katarina Pavičić	17 May 1999	1.80 m (5 ft 11 in)	63 kg (139 lb)	294 cm (116 in)	284 cm (112 in)	(Croatia) ŽOK Osijek
9	Lara Dežulović	23 April 1998	1.85 m (6 ft 1 in)	65 kg (143 lb)	305 cm (120 in)	290 cm (110 in)	
10	Ivana Miloš	7 March 1986	1.87 m (6 ft 2 in)	70 kg (150 lb)	317 cm (125 in)	305 cm (120 in)	
12	Jelena Šunjić	4 January 1994	1.89 m (6 ft 2 in)	75 kg (165 lb)	312 cm (123 in)	300 cm (120 in)	
13	Samanta Fabris (c)	8 February 1992	1.90 m (6 ft 3 in)	83 kg (183 lb)	325 cm (128 in)	306 cm (120 in)	(Italy) Pomi Casalmaggiore
15	Natalia Tomić	30 June 2002	1.84 m (6 ft 0 in)	60 kg (130 lb)	295 cm (116 in)	289 cm (114 in)	(Croatia) ŽOK Rijeka
16	Matea Ćurak	19 September 1995	1.86 m (6 ft 1 in)	73 kg (161 lb)	303 cm (119 in)	296 cm (117 in)	(Croatia) OK Marina Kaštela
17	Lara Vukasović	10 November 1994	1.96 m (6 ft 5 in)	84 kg (185 lb)	300 cm (120 in)	295 cm (116 in)	(United States) California Golden Bears
18	Ana Matić (L)	8 September 2000	1.65 m (5 ft 5 in)	55 kg (121 lb)	275 cm (108 in)	270 cm (110 in)	
19	Lucija Mlinar	6 May 1995	1.80 m (5 ft 11 in)	70 kg (150 lb)	308 cm (121 in)	287 cm (113 in)	(Croatia) HAOK Mladost
20	Katarina Luketić	28 September 1998	1.90 m (6 ft 3 in)	70 kg (150 lb)	310 cm (120 in)	299 cm (118 in)	
21	Lea Cvetnić	2 February 1999	1.86 m (6 ft 1 in)	71 kg (157 lb)	300 cm (120 in)	290 cm (110 in)	(Croatia) HAOK Mladost
22	Tea Jurić	29 April 1993	1.85 m (6 ft 1 in)	76 kg (168 lb)	300 cm (120 in)	288 cm (113 in)	
23	Dinka Kulić	2 August 1997	1.87 m (6 ft 2 in)	70 kg (150 lb)	300 cm (120 in)	288 cm (113 in)	(Croatia) ŽOK Vibrobeton

=== Czech Republic ===
The following is the Czech roster in the 2017 World Grand Prix.

Head coach: Zdeněk Pommer

No.	Name	Date of birth	Height	Weight	Spike	Block	2016–17 club
1	Andrea Kossanyiová	6 August 1993	1.86 m (6 ft 1 in)	72 kg (159 lb)	310 cm (120 in)	300 cm (120 in)	(Poland) Impel Wrocław
2	Lucie Nová	3 May 1996	1.84 m (6 ft 0 in)	68 kg (150 lb)	302 cm (119 in)	295 cm (116 in)	(Czech Republic) VK Prostějov
3	Kateřina Kohoutová	30 June 1992	1.82 m (6 ft 0 in)	66 kg (146 lb)	305 cm (120 in)	292 cm (115 in)	(Czech Republic) Volejbal Přerov
4	Aneta Havlíčková (c)	3 July 1987	1.90 m (6 ft 3 in)	96 kg (212 lb)	316 cm (124 in)	300 cm (120 in)	(Italy) Pallavolo Scandicci
6	Lucie Smutná	14 April 1991	1.80 m (5 ft 11 in)	75 kg (165 lb)	307 cm (121 in)	285 cm (112 in)	(Germany) Dresdner SC
7	Iva Nachmilnerová	20 September 1988	1.91 m (6 ft 3 in)	83 kg (183 lb)	310 cm (120 in)	299 cm (118 in)	(Czech Republic) TJ Ostrava
8	Barbora Purchartová	9 May 1992	1.89 m (6 ft 2 in)	81 kg (179 lb)	309 cm (122 in)	300 cm (120 in)	(Germany) Dresdner SC
9	Gabriela Kopacová	24 June 1998	1.85 m (6 ft 1 in)	70 kg (150 lb)	310 cm (120 in)	303 cm (119 in)	(Czech Republic) VK Královo Pole
10	Klára Mikelová	3 April 1998	1.82 m (6 ft 0 in)	76 kg (168 lb)	293 cm (115 in)	285 cm (112 in)	(Czech Republic) VK Královo Pole
11	Veronika Dostálová (L)	7 April 1992	1.70 m (5 ft 7 in)	66 kg (146 lb)	278 cm (109 in)	269 cm (106 in)	(Czech Republic) PVK Olymp Praha
12	Michaela Mlejnková	26 July 1996	1.85 m (6 ft 1 in)	75 kg (165 lb)	305 cm (120 in)	298 cm (117 in)	(Germany) Allianz MTV Stuttgart
13	Karolína Bednářová	20 July 1986	1.83 m (6 ft 0 in)	67 kg (148 lb)	304 cm (120 in)	285 cm (112 in)	(Germany) 1. VC Wiesbaden
14	Klára Vyklická	30 June 1993	1.84 m (6 ft 0 in)	73 kg (161 lb)	305 cm (120 in)	295 cm (116 in)	(Czech Republic) PVK Olymp Praha
15	Veronika Strusková	13 August 1991	1.82 m (6 ft 0 in)	80 kg (180 lb)	298 cm (117 in)	289 cm (114 in)	(Czech Republic) VK UP Olomouc
16	Helena Havelková	25 July 1988	1.86 m (6 ft 1 in)	70 kg (150 lb)	287 cm (113 in)	275 cm (108 in)	(China) Shanghai
17	Nikola Vanková (L)	7 January 1998	1.70 m (5 ft 7 in)	70 kg (150 lb)	287 cm (113 in)	275 cm (108 in)	(Czech Republic) VK Kralovo Pole
18	Pavla Vincourová	12 November 1992	1.80 m (5 ft 11 in)	68 kg (150 lb)	297 cm (117 in)	290 cm (110 in)	(Poland) Budowlani Łódź
19	Petra Kojdová	23 September 1993	1.83 m (6 ft 0 in)	68 kg (150 lb)	304 cm (120 in)	294 cm (116 in)	(Czech Republic) TJ Ostrava
20	Marie Toufarová	19 June 1992	1.84 m (6 ft 0 in)	70 kg (150 lb)	304 cm (120 in)	294 cm (116 in)	(Czech Republic) TJ Ostrava
21	Kateřina Valková	6 February 1996	1.77 m (5 ft 10 in)	59 kg (130 lb)	288 cm (113 in)	275 cm (108 in)	(Czech Republic) TJ Ostrava
22	Soňa Mikysková	2 May 1989	1.89 m (6 ft 2 in)	79 kg (174 lb)	305 cm (120 in)	300 cm (120 in)	(Poland) BKS Bielsko-Biała

=== Germany ===
The following is the German roster in the 2017 FIVB Volleyball World Grand Prix.

Head coach: Koslowski Felix

No.	Name	Date of birth	Height	Weight	Spike	Block	2016–17 club
1	Lenka Dürr (L)	10 December 1990	1.71 m (5 ft 7 in)	59 kg (130 lb)	280 cm (110 in)	270 cm (110 in)	(Germany) Schweriner SC
2	Irina Kemmsies	14 May 1996	1.81 m (5 ft 11 in)	65 kg (143 lb)	299 cm (118 in)	286 cm (113 in)	(Germany) VC Wiesbaden
3	Denise Hanke	31 August 1989	1.79 m (5 ft 10 in)	58 kg (128 lb)	284 cm (112 in)	272 cm (107 in)	(Germany) Schweriner SC
4	Maren Brinker (c)	10 July 1986	1.84 m (6 ft 0 in)	68 kg (150 lb)	303 cm (119 in)	295 cm (116 in)	(Germany) Schweriner SC
5	Jana Franziska Poll	7 May 1988	1.85 m (6 ft 1 in)	69 kg (152 lb)	310 cm (120 in)	290 cm (110 in)	(Greece) Panathinaikos
6	Jennifer Geerties	5 April 1994	1.84 m (6 ft 0 in)	58 kg (128 lb)	298 cm (117 in)	288 cm (113 in)	(Germany) Schweriner SC
7	Jennifer Pettke	29 May 1989	1.87 m (6 ft 2 in)	71 kg (157 lb)	302 cm (119 in)	290 cm (110 in)	(Germany) Allianz MTV Stuttgart
8	Berit Kauffeldt	8 July 1990	1.90 m (6 ft 3 in)	75 kg (165 lb)	311 cm (122 in)	294 cm (116 in)	(France) Béziers Volley
9	Kimberly Drewniok	11 August 1997	1.88 m (6 ft 2 in)	73 kg (161 lb)	311 cm (122 in)	298 cm (117 in)	(Germany) SS Potsdam
10	Lena Stigrot	20 December 1994	1.84 m (6 ft 0 in)	68 kg (150 lb)	303 cm (119 in)	295 cm (116 in)	(Germany) Rote Raben Vilsbiburg
11	Louisa Lippmann	23 September 1994	1.91 m (6 ft 3 in)	78 kg (172 lb)	319 cm (126 in)	312 cm (123 in)	(Germany) Schweriner SC
12	Aisha Skinner	16 April 1999	1.83 m (6 ft 0 in)	64 kg (141 lb)	300 cm (120 in)	290 cm (110 in)	(Germany) VCO Berlin
13	Lisa Izquierdo	29 August 1994	1.78 m (5 ft 10 in)	78 kg (172 lb)	309 cm (122 in)	294 cm (116 in)	(Turkey) Samsun Anakent
14	Marie Schölzel	1 August 1997	1.88 m (6 ft 2 in)	66 kg (146 lb)	307 cm (121 in)	299 cm (118 in)	(Germany) Schweriner SC
15	Lena Möllers	6 January 1990	1.88 m (6 ft 2 in)	74 kg (163 lb)	312 cm (123 in)	297 cm (117 in)	(France) Béziers Volley
16	Juliane Langgemach	6 November 1994	1.88 m (6 ft 2 in)	73 kg (161 lb)	295 cm (116 in)	285 cm (112 in)	(Germany) USC Münster
17	Anna Pogany (L)	21 July 1994	1.68 m (5 ft 6 in)	70 kg (150 lb)	280 cm (110 in)	270 cm (110 in)	(Germany) Köpenicker SC
18	Dora Grozer	21 November 1995	1.82 m (6 ft 0 in)	65 kg (143 lb)	302 cm (119 in)	297 cm (117 in)	(Germany) VC Wiesbaden
19	Tanja Großer	27 November 1993	1.77 m (5 ft 10 in)	60 kg (130 lb)	286 cm (113 in)	286 cm (113 in)	(Germany) VC Wiesbaden
20	Leonie Schwertmann	12 January 1994	1.90 m (6 ft 3 in)	80 kg (180 lb)	300 cm (120 in)	290 cm (110 in)	(Germany) USC Münster
21	Barbara Roxana Wezorke	12 April 1993	1.85 m (6 ft 1 in)	75 kg (165 lb)	305 cm (120 in)	290 cm (110 in)	(Germany) Rote Raben Vilsbiburg

=== Kazakhstan ===
The following is the Kazakhstani roster in the 2017 World Grand Prix.

Head coach: Shapran Vyacheslav

No.	Name	Date of birth	Height	Weight	Spike	Block	2016–17 club
1	Tatyana Mudritskaya	17 January 1985	1.95 m (6 ft 5 in)	77 kg (170 lb)	310 cm (120 in)	300 cm (120 in)	(Cyprus) Apollon Limassol
2	Lyudmila Issayeva	26 September 1989	1.84 m (6 ft 0 in)	70 kg (150 lb)	295 cm (116 in)	280 cm (110 in)	(Kazakhstan) Almaty VC
3	Sana Anarkulova	21 July 1989	1.88 m (6 ft 2 in)	77 kg (170 lb)	300 cm (120 in)	280 cm (110 in)	(Kazakhstan) Altay VC
4	Yekaterina Zhdanova	28 May 1992	1.83 m (6 ft 0 in)	65 kg (143 lb)	280 cm (110 in)	270 cm (110 in)	(Kazakhstan) Zhetyssu VC
5	Diana Kempa (L)	28 December 1992	1.67 m (5 ft 6 in)	56 kg (123 lb)	270 cm (110 in)	275 cm (108 in)	(Kazakhstan) Pavlodar VC
6	Natalya Akilova	31 May 1993	1.83 m (6 ft 0 in)	62 kg (137 lb)	295 cm (116 in)	275 cm (108 in)	(Kazakhstan) Zhetyssu VC
7	Inna Yakovleva	4 March 1988	1.77 m (5 ft 10 in)	65 kg (143 lb)	208 cm (82 in)	217 cm (85 in)	(Kazakhstan) Almaty VC
8	Korinna Ishimtseva	8 February 1984	1.87 m (6 ft 2 in)	69 kg (152 lb)	300 cm (120 in)	290 cm (110 in)	(Kazakhstan) Zhetyssu VC
9	Viktoriia Lokhmanchuk	9 May 2001	1.93 m (6 ft 4 in)	70 kg (150 lb)	0 cm (0 in)	0 cm (0 in)	(Kazakhstan) Altay VC
10	Irina Kenzhebaeva	15 December 1992	1.80 m (5 ft 11 in)	73 kg (161 lb)	290 cm (110 in)	280 cm (110 in)	(Kazakhstan) VC Astana
11	Katerina Tatko	15 December 1992	1.82 m (6 ft 0 in)	70 kg (150 lb)	285 cm (112 in)	275 cm (108 in)	(Kazakhstan) Zhetyssu VC
12	Ainagul Aizharikhova	4 September 1994	1.86 m (6 ft 1 in)	65 kg (143 lb)	295 cm (116 in)	285 cm (112 in)	(Kazakhstan) Altay VC
13	Radmila Beresneva (c)	6 June 1983	1.85 m (6 ft 1 in)	70 kg (150 lb)	300 cm (120 in)	295 cm (116 in)	(Kazakhstan) Irtysh-Kazchrome
14	Antonina Rubtsova	30 December 1984	1.90 m (6 ft 3 in)	73 kg (161 lb)	303 cm (119 in)	296 cm (117 in)	(Kazakhstan) Zhetyssu VC
15	Aliya Batkuldina	18 November 1995	1.81 m (5 ft 11 in)	74 kg (163 lb)	273 cm (107 in)	264 cm (104 in)	(Kazakhstan) Almaty VC
16	Inna Matveyeva	12 October 1978	1.86 m (6 ft 1 in)	70 kg (150 lb)	303 cm (119 in)	294 cm (116 in)	(Kazakhstan) Altay VC
17	Alla Bogdashkina	22 August 1985	1.85 m (6 ft 1 in)	65 kg (143 lb)	275 cm (108 in)	270 cm (110 in)	(Kazakhstan) Irtysh-Kazchrome
18	Kristina Anikonova	5 January 1991	1.83 m (6 ft 0 in)	73 kg (161 lb)	295 cm (116 in)	285 cm (112 in)	(Kazakhstan) Altay VC
19	Alessya Safronova	10 February 1986	1.92 m (6 ft 4 in)	70 kg (150 lb)	290 cm (110 in)	280 cm (110 in)	(Kazakhstan) Altay VC
20	Tatyana Fendrikova	23 February 1990	1.69 m (5 ft 7 in)	55 kg (121 lb)	280 cm (110 in)	275 cm (108 in)	(Kazakhstan) Almaty VC
21	Valeriya Rylova (L)	22 November 1987	1.79 m (5 ft 10 in)	72 kg (159 lb)	280 cm (110 in)	270 cm (110 in)	(Kazakhstan) Irtysh-Kazchrome

=== Peru ===
The following is the Peruvian roster in the 2017 World Grand Prix.

Head coach: (Brazil) Luizomar de Moura

No.	Name	Date of birth	Height	Weight	Spike	Block	2016–17 club
1	Raffaella Camet	14 September 1992	1.85 m (6 ft 1 in)	67 kg (148 lb)	289 cm (114 in)	285 cm (112 in)	(Peru) Club Sporting Cristal
2	Mirtha Uribe (c)	12 March 1985	1.84 m (6 ft 0 in)	67 kg (148 lb)	297 cm (117 in)	286 cm (113 in)	(Peru) Deportivo Jaamsa
3	Brenda Uribe	11 December 1993	1.85 m (6 ft 1 in)	63 kg (139 lb)	302 cm (119 in)	292 cm (115 in)	(Peru) Club Alianza Lima Vóley
4	Patricia Soto	10 February 1980	1.79 m (5 ft 10 in)	67 kg (148 lb)	300 cm (120 in)	295 cm (116 in)	(Peru) Deportivo Geminis Voley
5	Shiamara Almeida	19 February 1996	1.72 m (5 ft 8 in)	62 kg (137 lb)	286 cm (113 in)	275 cm (108 in)	(Peru) Club Alianza Lima Vóley
6	Alexandra Muñoz	16 August 1992	1.80 m (5 ft 11 in)	63 kg (139 lb)	287 cm (113 in)	281 cm (111 in)	(Peru) Deportivo Geminis Voley
7	Andrea Urrutia	31 May 1997	1.85 m (6 ft 1 in)	65 kg (143 lb)	278 cm (109 in)	275 cm (108 in)	(Peru) CV Universidad de San Martín de Porres
8	Maguilaura Frias	28 May 1997	1.86 m (6 ft 1 in)	71 kg (157 lb)	291 cm (115 in)	280 cm (110 in)	(Peru) CV Universidad de San Martín de Porres
9	Janice Torres (L)	8 November 1989	1.66 m (5 ft 5 in)	55 kg (121 lb)	258 cm (102 in)	261 cm (103 in)	(Peru) CV Universidad de San Martín de Porres
10	Mirian Patiño (L)	28 March 1990	1.68 m (5 ft 6 in)	67 kg (148 lb)	275 cm (108 in)	270 cm (110 in)	(Peru) Regatas Lima Vóley
11	Clarivett Yllescas	11 August 1993	1.85 m (6 ft 1 in)	63 kg (139 lb)	305 cm (120 in)	295 cm (116 in)	(Peru) Circolo Sportivo Italiano Vóley
12	Ángela Leyva	22 November 1996	1.84 m (6 ft 0 in)	70 kg (150 lb)	312 cm (123 in)	291 cm (115 in)	(Peru) CV Universidad de San Martín de Porres
13	Mabel Olemar	10 May 1993	1.76 m (5 ft 9 in)	65 kg (143 lb)	293 cm (115 in)	280 cm (110 in)	(Peru) Jaamsa Voleibol Club
14	Alexandra Machado	28 February 1995	1.78 m (5 ft 10 in)	65 kg (143 lb)	293 cm (115 in)	284 cm (112 in)	(Peru) Regatas Lima Vóley
15	Jessenia Uceda	14 August 1981	1.78 m (5 ft 10 in)	69 kg (152 lb)	304 cm (120 in)	294 cm (116 in)	(Peru) Regatas Lima Vóley
16	Vanessa Palacios (L)	3 July 1984	1.70 m (5 ft 7 in)	61 kg (134 lb)	275 cm (108 in)	260 cm (100 in)	(Peru) CV Universidad Cesar Vallejo
17	Nathalie Sandoval	14 June 1989	1.78 m (5 ft 10 in)	65 kg (143 lb)	293 cm (115 in)	284 cm (112 in)	(Peru) Jaamsa Voleibol Club
18	Coraima Gómez	9 August 1996	1.79 m (5 ft 10 in)	70 kg (150 lb)	300 cm (120 in)	285 cm (112 in)	(Peru) Club Alianza Lima Vóley
19	Zoila La Rosa	31 May 1990	1.76 m (5 ft 9 in)	57 kg (126 lb)	285 cm (112 in)	280 cm (110 in)	(Peru) CV Universidad de San Martín de Porres
20	Carla Rueda	19 April 1990	1.84 m (6 ft 0 in)	70 kg (150 lb)	312 cm (123 in)	306 cm (120 in)	(Peru) Deportivo Geminis Voley

=== Poland ===
The following is the Polish roster in the 2017 World Grand Prix.

Head coach: Jacek Nawrocki

No.	Name	Date of birth	Height	Weight	Spike	Block	2016–17 club
3	Klaudia Alagierska	2 January 1996	1.90 m (6 ft 3 in)	76 kg (168 lb)	297 cm (117 in)	290 cm (110 in)	(Poland) Legionovia Legionowo
4	Patrycja Polak	23 February 1991	1.83 m (6 ft 0 in)	62 kg (137 lb)	301 cm (119 in)	279 cm (110 in)	(Poland) Dąbrowa Górnicza
5	Agnieszka Kąkolewska	17 October 1994	1.97 m (6 ft 6 in)	75 kg (165 lb)	309 cm (122 in)	295 cm (116 in)	(Poland) Budowlani Łódź
6	Ewelina Tobiasz	6 February 1994	1.77 m (5 ft 10 in)	67 kg (148 lb)	293 cm (115 in)	276 cm (109 in)	(Poland) Dąbrowa Górnicza
7	Berenika Tomsia	18 March 1988	1.88 m (6 ft 2 in)	72 kg (159 lb)	310 cm (120 in)	302 cm (119 in)	(Italy) Lardini Filottrano
8	Ewelina Polak	17 April 1993	1.76 m (5 ft 9 in)	67 kg (148 lb)	282 cm (111 in)	276 cm (109 in)	(Poland) Budowlani Łódź
9	Aleksandra Krzos	23 June 1989	1.81 m (5 ft 11 in)	71 kg (157 lb)	275 cm (108 in)	260 cm (100 in)	(Poland) Chemik Police
10	Zuzanna Efimienko	8 August 1989	1.97 m (6 ft 6 in)	72 kg (159 lb)	318 cm (125 in)	303 cm (119 in)	(Poland) ŁKS Łódź
12	Monika Bociek	6 April 1996	1.85 m (6 ft 1 in)	70 kg (150 lb)	302 cm (119 in)	287 cm (113 in)	(Poland) Muszynianka Muszyna
13	Agata Witkowska (L)	19 August 1989	1.70 m (5 ft 7 in)	63 kg (139 lb)	280 cm (110 in)	275 cm (108 in)	(Poland) Budowlani Łódź
14	Joanna Wołosz (c)	7 April 1990	1.81 m (5 ft 11 in)	65 kg (143 lb)	303 cm (119 in)	281 cm (111 in)	(Italy) Imoco Conegliano
15	Martyna Grajber	28 March 1995	1.80 m (5 ft 11 in)	67 kg (148 lb)	293 cm (115 in)	276 cm (109 in)	(Poland) Budowlani Łódź
16	Natalia Mędrzyk	13 January 1992	1.83 m (6 ft 0 in)	73 kg (161 lb)	305 cm (120 in)	287 cm (113 in)	(Poland) Chemik Police
17	Malwina Smarzek	3 June 1996	1.91 m (6 ft 3 in)	80 kg (180 lb)	318 cm (125 in)	292 cm (115 in)	(Poland) Chemik Police
18	Maria Stenzel	25 November 1998	1.68 m (5 ft 6 in)	53 kg (117 lb)	273 cm (107 in)	261 cm (103 in)	(Poland) Impel Wrocław
20	Marlena Pleśnierowicz	9 January 1992	1.76 m (5 ft 9 in)	61 kg (134 lb)	295 cm (116 in)	281 cm (111 in)	(Poland) Bielsko-Biała
21	Olivia Rozanski	5 June 1997	1.85 m (6 ft 1 in)	74 kg (163 lb)	305 cm (120 in)	286 cm (113 in)	(Poland) PZPS Szczyrk
22	Roksana Brzóska	2 September 1993	1.80 m (5 ft 11 in)	75 kg (165 lb)	300 cm (120 in)	289 cm (114 in)	(Poland) Muszynianka Muszyna
23	Julia Twardowska	4 May 1995	1.85 m (6 ft 1 in)	66 kg (146 lb)	297 cm (117 in)	283 cm (111 in)	(Poland) Budowlani Łódź
24	Aleksandra Sikorska	28 April 1993	1.85 m (6 ft 1 in)	67 kg (148 lb)	306 cm (120 in)	286 cm (113 in)	(Poland) Dąbrowa Górnicza
25	Małgorzata Jasek	14 March 1995	1.91 m (6 ft 3 in)	78 kg (172 lb)	300 cm (120 in)	240 cm (94 in)	(Poland) AZS-AWF Warszawa

=== Puerto Rico ===
The following is the Puerto Rican roster in the 2017 World Grand Prix.

Head coach: Javier Gaspar

No.	Name	Date of birth	Height	Weight	Spike	Block	2016–17 club
1	Daly Santana	19 February 1995	1.82 m (6 ft 0 in)	72 kg (159 lb)	243 cm (96 in)	219 cm (86 in)	(Italy) Il Bisonte Firenze
2	Shara Venegas (L)	18 September 1992	1.73 m (5 ft 8 in)	68 kg (150 lb)	280 cm (110 in)	272 cm (107 in)	(Puerto Rico) Criollas de Caguas
3	Valeria León (L)	21 May 1995	1.66 m (5 ft 5 in)	67 kg (148 lb)	280 cm (110 in)		(Puerto Rico) Leonas de Ponce
4	Raymariely Santos	13 April 1992	1.83 m (6 ft 0 in)	73 kg (161 lb)	290 cm (110 in)	288 cm (113 in)	(Puerto Rico) Indias de Mayagüez
5	Katherine Santiago (L)	10 December 1993	1.63 m (5 ft 4 in)	66 kg (146 lb)	232 cm (91 in)	224 cm (88 in)	(Puerto Rico) Orientales de Humacao
6	Jocelyn Kuilan	8 December 1997	1.79 m (5 ft 10 in)	72 kg (159 lb)	240 cm (94 in)	232 cm (91 in)	(United States) Towson Tigers
7	Stephanie Enright	15 December 1990	1.79 m (5 ft 10 in)	56 kg (123 lb)	300 cm (120 in)	292 cm (115 in)	(Italy) Igor Gorgonzola Novara
8	Jennifer Nogueras	1 August 1991	1.85 m (6 ft 1 in)	88 kg (194 lb)	299 cm (118 in)	292 cm (115 in)	(Puerto Rico) Criollas de Caguas
9	Janeliss Torres	9 July 1995	1.78 m (5 ft 10 in)	63 kg (139 lb)	243 cm (96 in)	219 cm (86 in)	(Puerto Rico) Leonas de Ponce
10	Jennifer Quesada	22 February 1992	1.88 m (6 ft 2 in)	71 kg (157 lb)	299 cm (118 in)	295 cm (116 in)	(Puerto Rico) Orientales de Humacao
11	Karina Ocasio	1 August 1985	1.92 m (6 ft 4 in)	76 kg (168 lb)	298 cm (117 in)	288 cm (113 in)	(Puerto Rico) Criollas de Caguas
12	Genesis Miranda	5 June 1995	1.76 m (5 ft 9 in)	59 kg (130 lb)	233 cm (92 in)	231 cm (91 in)	(United States) Ohio State Buckeyes
13	Shirley Ferrer	23 June 1995	1.80 m (5 ft 11 in)	63 kg (139 lb)	290 cm (110 in)	293 cm (115 in)	(France) Pays d'Aix Venelles
14	Natalia Valentín (c)	12 September 1989	1.70 m (5 ft 7 in)	61 kg (134 lb)	244 cm (96 in)	240 cm (94 in)	(France) St-Raphaël Var Volley Ball
15	Genesis Collazo	4 October 1995	1.85 m (6 ft 1 in)	74 kg (163 lb)	301 cm (119 in)	296 cm (117 in)	(Puerto Rico) Criollas de Caguas
16	Yeaneska Matos	29 April 1996	1.86 m (6 ft 1 in)	68 kg (150 lb)	302 cm (119 in)	297 cm (117 in)	(Puerto Rico) Gigantes de Carolina
17	Noami Santos	29 November 1995	1.92 m (6 ft 4 in)	63 kg (139 lb)	309 cm (122 in)	300 cm (120 in)	(Puerto Rico) Capitalinas de San Juan
18	Alba Hernández	3 October 1995	2.07 m (6 ft 9 in)	87 kg (192 lb)	305 cm (120 in)	293 cm (115 in)	(Puerto Rico) Changas de Naranjito
19	Ana Sofía Jusino	5 January 1995	1.89 m (6 ft 2 in)	65 kg (143 lb)	310 cm (120 in)	294 cm (116 in)	(Puerto Rico) Criollas de Caguas
20	Stephany Salas	17 January 1992	1.74 m (5 ft 9 in)	78 kg (172 lb)	236 cm (93 in)	230 cm (91 in)	(Puerto Rico) Changas de Naranjito
22	Adriana Vinas Joy	1 March 1994	1.78 m (5 ft 10 in)	74 kg (163 lb)	245 cm (96 in)	237 cm (93 in)	(Puerto Rico) Gigantes de Carolina

=== South Korea ===
The following is the Korean roster in the 2017 World Grand Prix.

Head coach: Hong Sung-jin

No.	Name	Date of birth	Height	Weight	Spike	Block	2016–17 club
1	Lee So-young	17 October 1994	1.76 m (5 ft 9 in)	66 kg (146 lb)	280 cm (110 in)	265 cm (104 in)	(South Korea) GS Caltex Seoul KIXX
2	Kim Yeong-gyeon	1 December 1993	1.62 m (5 ft 4 in)	48 kg (106 lb)	250 cm (98 in)	240 cm (94 in)	(South Korea) Suwon Hyundai Engineering & Construction
3	Yeum Hye-seon	3 February 1991	1.77 m (5 ft 10 in)	65 kg (143 lb)	278 cm (109 in)	263 cm (104 in)	(South Korea) Hwaseong IBK Altos
4	Kim Hee-jin	29 April 1991	1.85 m (6 ft 1 in)	75 kg (165 lb)	300 cm (120 in)	295 cm (116 in)	(South Korea) Hwaseong IBK Altos
5	Kim Hae-ran (L)	16 March 1984	1.68 m (5 ft 6 in)	57 kg (126 lb)	280 cm (110 in)	270 cm (110 in)	(South Korea) Incheon Heungkuk Life Pink Spiders
6	Lee So-ra	1 September 1987	1.77 m (5 ft 10 in)	62 kg (137 lb)	295 cm (116 in)	285 cm (112 in)	(South Korea) Daejeon KGC
7	Lee Jae-yeong	15 October 1996	1.79 m (5 ft 10 in)	63 kg (139 lb)	286 cm (113 in)	267 cm (105 in)	(South Korea) Incheon Heungkuk Life Pink Spiders
8	Na Hyun-jung (L)	10 March 1990	1.63 m (5 ft 4 in)	54 kg (119 lb)	257 cm (101 in)	250 cm (98 in)	(South Korea) GS Caltex Seoul KIXX
9	Han Soo-ji	1 February 1989	1.82 m (6 ft 0 in)	78 kg (172 lb)	305 cm (120 in)	296 cm (117 in)	(South Korea) Daejeon KGC
10	Kim Yeon-koung (c)	26 February 1988	1.92 m (6 ft 4 in)	73 kg (161 lb)	310 cm (120 in)	300 cm (120 in)	(Turkey) Fenerbahçe
11	Kim Su-ji	11 July 1987	1.86 m (6 ft 1 in)	68 kg (150 lb)	303 cm (119 in)	294 cm (116 in)	(South Korea) Hwaseong IBK Altos
12	Bae Yoo-na	30 November 1989	1.82 m (6 ft 0 in)	66 kg (146 lb)	288 cm (113 in)	280 cm (110 in)	(South Korea) Korea Expressway Corporation Hi-Pass
13	Park Jeong-ah	26 March 1993	1.87 m (6 ft 2 in)	73 kg (161 lb)	300 cm (120 in)	290 cm (110 in)	(South Korea) Korea Expressway Corporation Hi-Pass
14	Yang Hyo-jin	14 December 1989	1.90 m (6 ft 3 in)	72 kg (159 lb)	308 cm (121 in)	301 cm (119 in)	(South Korea) Suwon Hyundai Engineering & Construction
15	Kang So-hwi	18 July 1997	1.80 m (5 ft 11 in)	65 kg (143 lb)	295 cm (116 in)	282 cm (111 in)	(South Korea) GS Caltex Seoul KIXX
16	An Hye-jin	16 February 1998	1.75 m (5 ft 9 in)	60 kg (130 lb)	290 cm (110 in)	280 cm (110 in)	(South Korea) GS Caltex Seoul KIXX
17	Kim Mi-youn	5 March 1993	1.78 m (5 ft 10 in)	62 kg (137 lb)	290 cm (110 in)	280 cm (110 in)	(South Korea) Hwaseong IBK Altos
18	Hwang Min-kyoung	2 June 1990	1.74 m (5 ft 9 in)	64 kg (141 lb)	290 cm (110 in)	282 cm (111 in)	(South Korea) Suwon Hyundai Engineering & Construction
19	Cho Song-hwa	12 March 1993	1.76 m (5 ft 9 in)	68 kg (150 lb)	280 cm (110 in)	260 cm (100 in)	(South Korea) Incheon Heungkuk Life Pink Spiders
20	Moon Myoung-hwa	4 September 1995	1.90 m (6 ft 3 in)	73 kg (161 lb)	280 cm (110 in)	287 cm (113 in)	(South Korea) GS Caltex Seoul KIXX
21	Go Ye-rim	12 June 1994	1.77 m (5 ft 10 in)	64 kg (141 lb)	290 cm (110 in)	280 cm (110 in)	(South Korea) Hwaseong IBK Altos

== Group 3 ==
=== Algeria ===
The following is the Algerian roster in the 2017 World Grand Prix.

Head coach: Nabil Tennoun

No.	Name	Date of birth	Height	Weight	Spike	Block	2016–17 club
4	Nawel Hammouche	25 April 1997	1.85 m (6 ft 1 in)	66 kg (146 lb)	270 cm (110 in)	265 cm (104 in)	(Algeria) NC Bejaia
6	Zahra Guimour	22 November 1996	1.71 m (5 ft 7 in)	58 kg (128 lb)	272 cm (107 in)	250 cm (98 in)	(Algeria) NR Chlef
7	Chettout Kahina (c)	20 May 1992	1.68 m (5 ft 6 in)	60 kg (130 lb)	260 cm (100 in)	255 cm (100 in)	(Algeria) GS Pétroliers
8	Bekhta Rabah-Mazari	5 May 1998	1.76 m (5 ft 9 in)	60 kg (130 lb)	275 cm (108 in)	270 cm (110 in)	(Algeria) NR Chlef
9	Chanez Ayadi	8 February 1994	1.73 m (5 ft 8 in)	59 kg (130 lb)	271 cm (107 in)	254 cm (100 in)	(Algeria) NC Bejaia
10	Celia Bourihane	22 January 1995	1.78 m (5 ft 10 in)	56 kg (123 lb)	277 cm (109 in)	255 cm (100 in)	(Algeria) NC Bejaia
11	Yasmine Abderrahim	16 April 1999	1.82 m (6 ft 0 in)	62 kg (137 lb)	290 cm (110 in)	283 cm (111 in)	(Algeria) ASW Bejaia
12	Melissa Kasri	13 February 1998	1.82 m (6 ft 0 in)	59 kg (130 lb)	280 cm (110 in)	270 cm (110 in)	(Algeria) NC Bejaia
13	Kahina Bounser	22 July 1998	1.71 m (5 ft 7 in)	58 kg (128 lb)	272 cm (107 in)	250 cm (98 in)	(Algeria) ASW Bejaia
15	Aicha Mezemate	6 June 1991	1.87 m (6 ft 2 in)	75 kg (165 lb)	300 cm (120 in)	285 cm (112 in)	(Algeria) GS Pétroliers
18	Dallal Merwa Achour	3 November 1994	1.76 m (5 ft 9 in)	60 kg (130 lb)	275 cm (108 in)	262 cm (103 in)	(Algeria) NR Chlef
21	Amira Sadi	10 September 1994	1.87 m (6 ft 2 in)	70 kg (150 lb)	280 cm (110 in)	273 cm (107 in)	(Algeria) RUBA

=== Australia ===
The following is the Australian roster in the 2017 World Grand Prix.

Head coach: Shannon Winzer

No.	Name	Date of birth	Height	Weight	Spike	Block	2016–17 club
1	Jennifer Tait	4 January 1995	1.91 m (6 ft 3 in)	80 kg (180 lb)	306 cm (120 in)	291 cm (115 in)	(Australia) VA Centre of Excellence
3	Sophie Paine	1 September 1992	1.76 m (5 ft 9 in)	65 kg (143 lb)	287 cm (113 in)	276 cm (109 in)	(Australia) University Blues
4	Sophie Godfrey	2 December 1987	1.86 m (6 ft 1 in)	73 kg (161 lb)	295 cm (116 in)	284 cm (112 in)	(Australia) WA Pearls
6	Alice De Innocentiis (L)	4 June 1984	1.67 m (5 ft 6 in)	66 kg (146 lb)	278 cm (109 in)	247 cm (97 in)	(Australia) UTSSU Sydney
8	Hannah Martin	15 September 1990	1.83 m (6 ft 0 in)	80 kg (180 lb)	294 cm (116 in)	289 cm (114 in)	(Indonesia) Club BVN Volleyball Bekasi
9	Jamie-Lee Morrow	16 November 1992	1.82 m (6 ft 0 in)	77 kg (170 lb)	290 cm (110 in)	287 cm (113 in)	(Australia) VA Centre of Excellence
10	Katarina Osadchuk	18 November 1991	1.91 m (6 ft 3 in)	75 kg (165 lb)	320 cm (130 in)	310 cm (120 in)	(Germany) VFB 91 Suhl
11	Jennifer Sadler	18 March 1993	1.85 m (6 ft 1 in)	69 kg (152 lb)	302 cm (119 in)	291 cm (115 in)	(Australia) WA Pearls
12	Kathryn Chen (L)	27 September 1990	1.65 m (5 ft 5 in)	66 kg (146 lb)	262 cm (103 in)	255 cm (100 in)	(Australia) VA Centre of Excellence
13	Beth Carey (c)	28 September 1990	1.90 m (6 ft 3 in)	78 kg (172 lb)	300 cm (120 in)	290 cm (110 in)	(Australia) Adelaide Storm
14	Rebecca Reeve (L)	23 May 1994	1.79 m (5 ft 10 in)	69 kg (152 lb)	294 cm (116 in)	283 cm (111 in)	(Australia) Adelaide Storm
19	Kelly Lean	19 July 1995	1.75 m (5 ft 9 in)	70 kg (150 lb)	281 cm (111 in)	269 cm (106 in)	(Australia) Melbourne Vipers
20	Rachel Rourke	11 October 1988	1.93 m (6 ft 4 in)	80 kg (180 lb)	315 cm (124 in)	303 cm (119 in)	(China) Beijing BAIC Motors
22	Eliza Karley Hynes	29 January 1992	1.83 m (6 ft 0 in)	70 kg (150 lb)	305 cm (120 in)	292 cm (115 in)	(Germany) 1.VC Wiesbaden

=== Cameroon ===
The following is the Cameroonian roster in the 2017 World Grand Prix.

Head coach: Jean-René Akono

No.	Name	Date of birth	Height	Weight	Spike	Block	2016–17 club
1	Stéphanie Fotso Mogoung	25 September 1987	1.87 m (6 ft 2 in)	78 kg (172 lb)	301 cm (119 in)	275 cm (108 in)	(France) Volleyball Club Harnes
2	Christelle Tchoudjang Nana (c)	7 July 1989	1.84 m (6 ft 0 in)	80 kg (180 lb)	308 cm (121 in)	285 cm (112 in)	(France) VBC Chamalières
4	Raïssa Nasser (L)	19 August 1994	1.73 m (5 ft 8 in)	73 kg (161 lb)	284 cm (112 in)	270 cm (110 in)	(France) La Rochelle
6	Laetitia Moma Bassoko	9 October 1993	1.84 m (6 ft 0 in)	81 kg (179 lb)	301 cm (119 in)	281 cm (111 in)	(France) ASPTT Mulhouse VB
7	Henriette Nadege Koulla	14 September 1992	1.71 m (5 ft 7 in)	67 kg (148 lb)	280 cm (110 in)	264 cm (104 in)	(France)
10	Berthrade Simone Flore Bikatal	23 July 1992	1.83 m (6 ft 0 in)	76 kg (168 lb)	297 cm (117 in)	253 cm (100 in)	(France) Bordeaux Mérignac
11	Victoire L'or Ngon Ntame	31 December 1985	1.77 m (5 ft 10 in)	79 kg (174 lb)	288 cm (113 in)	253 cm (100 in)	(Cameroon) INJS VB
12	Abdoulkarim Fawziya	1 March 1989	1.80 m (5 ft 11 in)	67 kg (148 lb)	292 cm (115 in)	275 cm (108 in)	(France) Sens Olympique Club VB
14	Yolande Amana Guigolo	15 September 1997	1.84 m (6 ft 0 in)	78 kg (172 lb)	292 cm (115 in)	275 cm (108 in)	(France) VBC Chamalières
15	Emelda Piata Zessi	8 April 1997	1.90 m (6 ft 3 in)	65 kg (143 lb)	295 cm (116 in)	281 cm (111 in)	(France) Nantes VBC
16	Estelle Adiana	14 May 1997	1.82 m (6 ft 0 in)	85 kg (187 lb)	295 cm (116 in)	256 cm (101 in)	(Cameroon) Nyong-et-Kéllé VB
18	Odette Ahirnidi Menkred (L)	5 November 1999	1.74 m (5 ft 9 in)	68 kg (150 lb)	270 cm (110 in)	250 cm (98 in)	(Cameroon) INJS VB

=== France ===
The following is the French roster in the 2017 World Grand Prix.

Head coach: Félix Andre

No.	Name	Date of birth	Height	Weight	Spike	Block	2016–17 club
6	Marie-France Garreau Djé	10 April 1992	1.81 m (5 ft 11 in)	75 kg (165 lb)	305 cm (120 in)	290 cm (110 in)	(France) Entente sportive Le Cannet
7	Silvana Dascalu	14 May 1994	1.92 m (6 ft 4 in)	70 kg (150 lb)	290 cm (110 in)	281 cm (111 in)	(France) Saint-Cloud Paris SF
8	Lucille Gicquel	13 November 1997	1.89 m (6 ft 2 in)	72 kg (159 lb)	305 cm (120 in)	290 cm (110 in)	(France)
9	Odette Ndoye	25 August 1992	1.81 m (5 ft 11 in)	73 kg (161 lb)	293 cm (115 in)	279 cm (110 in)	(France) Saint-Cloud Paris SF
10	Bruna Pezelj	15 January 1999			295 cm (116 in)	275 cm (108 in)	Association sportive de Monaco
15	Oriane Amalric	11 October 1990	1.72 m (5 ft 8 in)	58 kg (128 lb)	275 cm (108 in)	267 cm (105 in)	(France) Evreux Volley-Ball
16	Juliette Fidon (c)	28 October 1996	1.84 m (6 ft 0 in)	86 kg (190 lb)	297 cm (117 in)	297 cm (117 in)	(France) Evreux Volley-Ball
17	Alexandra Dascalu	17 April 1991	1.84 m (6 ft 0 in)	71 kg (157 lb)	294 cm (116 in)	283 cm (111 in)	(France) Saint-Cloud Paris SF
18	Alexandra Rochelle (L)	14 December 1983	1.68 m (5 ft 6 in)	69 kg (152 lb)	292 cm (115 in)	280 cm (110 in)	(France) Béziers VB
19	Nina Stojiljković	1 September 1996	1.80 m (5 ft 11 in)	68 kg (150 lb)	285 cm (112 in)	274 cm (108 in)	(France)
22	Safiatou Zongo	14 March 1994	1.82 m (6 ft 0 in)	75 kg (165 lb)	292 cm (115 in)	272 cm (107 in)	(France) Béziers VB

=== Hungary ===
The following is the Hungarian roster in the 2017 World Grand Prix.

Head coach: Alberto Salomoni

No.	Name	Date of birth	Height	Weight	Spike	Block	2016–17 club
1	Gréta Szakmáry	31 December 1991	1.86 m (6 ft 1 in)	72 kg (159 lb)	306 cm (120 in)	290 cm (110 in)	(Hungary) Linamar - Békéscsabai RSE
3	Renáta Szpin (L)	30 April 1996	1.72 m (5 ft 8 in)	62 kg (137 lb)	280 cm (110 in)	268 cm (106 in)	(Hungary) Linamar - Békéscsabai RSE
8	Zsuzsanna Tálas (c)	9 July 1993	1.74 m (5 ft 9 in)	66 kg (146 lb)	290 cm (110 in)	270 cm (110 in)	(Hungary) Linamar - Békéscsabai RSE
9	Bernadett Dékány	30 June 1992	1.87 m (6 ft 2 in)	76 kg (168 lb)	301 cm (119 in)	290 cm (110 in)	(Romania) CSM București
11	Nikolett Soós	17 October 1988	1.85 m (6 ft 1 in)	76 kg (168 lb)	297 cm (117 in)	275 cm (108 in)	(Hungary) Linamar - Békéscsabai RSE
12	Dóra Kötél (L)	16 June 1988	1.75 m (5 ft 9 in)	61 kg (134 lb)	273 cm (107 in)	263 cm (104 in)	(Hungary) UTE
13	Lilla Villám	3 June 1997	1.84 m (6 ft 0 in)	79 kg (174 lb)	290 cm (110 in)	275 cm (108 in)	(Hungary) Fatum – Nyíregyháza
14	Edina Dobi	22 October 1987	1.90 m (6 ft 3 in)	70 kg (150 lb)	308 cm (121 in)	299 cm (118 in)	(Azerbaijan) Azerrail Baku
16	Eszter Nagy	1 November 1991	1.86 m (6 ft 1 in)	81 kg (179 lb)	304 cm (120 in)	288 cm (113 in)	(Germany) VC Wiesbaden
17	Réka Bleicher	15 October 1995	1.87 m (6 ft 2 in)	70 kg (150 lb)	293 cm (115 in)	280 cm (110 in)	(Germany) Jászberényi RK
18	Ágnes Pallag	2 September 1993	1.78 m (5 ft 10 in)	69 kg (152 lb)	298 cm (117 in)	271 cm (107 in)	(France) Vandœuvre Nancy Volley-Ball
21	Kata Török	26 May 1998	1.82 m (6 ft 0 in)	67 kg (148 lb)	290 cm (110 in)	279 cm (110 in)	(Hungary) Vasas Óbuda
23	Eszter Pekárik	8 December 1996	1.90 m (6 ft 3 in)	80 kg (180 lb)	293 cm (115 in)	285 cm (112 in)	(Hungary) Vasas Óbuda

=== Mexico ===
The following is the Mexican roster in the 2017 World Grand Prix.

Head coach: Ricardo de Jesús Naranjo Ponce

No.	Name	Date of birth	Height	Weight	Spike	Block	2016–17 club
1	Karla Sainz	22 July 1993	1.84 m (6 ft 0 in)	75 kg (165 lb)	282 cm (111 in)	272 cm (107 in)	(Mexico) Baja California
3	Sashiko Sanay	13 May 1995	1.70 m (5 ft 7 in)	63 kg (139 lb)	280 cm (110 in)	258 cm (102 in)	(Mexico) Baja California
4	Andrea Maldonado	8 September 1991	1.79 m (5 ft 10 in)	78 kg (172 lb)	292 cm (115 in)	294 cm (116 in)	(Mexico) Guanajuato
6	Freda López	17 June 1988	1.64 m (5 ft 5 in)	64 kg (141 lb)	235 cm (93 in)	230 cm (91 in)	(Mexico) Oaxaca
7	Renata López	15 February 2001	1.85 m (6 ft 1 in)	74 kg (163 lb)	291 cm (115 in)	283 cm (111 in)	(Mexico) Jalisco
8	Dulce Carranza	29 June 1990	1.78 m (5 ft 10 in)	83 kg (183 lb)	275 cm (108 in)	252 cm (99 in)	(Mexico) Nuevo León
9	Alejandra Segura	9 November 1993	1.77 m (5 ft 10 in)	69 kg (152 lb)	291 cm (115 in)	283 cm (111 in)	(Mexico) Nuevo León
12	Fernanda Banuelos	19 March 1997	1.86 m (6 ft 1 in)	70 kg (150 lb)	303 cm (119 in)	285 cm (112 in)	(Mexico) Baja California
14	Claudia Rios	22 September 1992	1.78 m (5 ft 10 in)	64 kg (141 lb)	282 cm (111 in)	262 cm (103 in)	(Mexico) Tamaulipas
16	Rosa Vallejo	30 May 1987					
18	Fernanda Rodriguez	23 June 1997	1.85 m (6 ft 1 in)	80 kg (180 lb)	287 cm (113 in)	280 cm (110 in)	(Mexico) Nuevo León
20	Natalie Nizeth Nava Minjarez	19 October 2000	1.80 m (5 ft 11 in)	76 kg (168 lb)	295 cm (116 in)	288 cm (113 in)	(Mexico) Baja California

=== Trinidad and Tobago ===
The following is the Trinidadian roster in the 2017 World Grand Prix.

Head coach: Francisco Cruz Jiménez

No.	Name	Date of birth	Height	Weight	Spike	Block	2016–17 club
2	Jalicia Ross	26 July 1984	1.85 m (6 ft 1 in)	72 kg (159 lb)	308 cm (121 in)	270 cm (110 in)	(Trinidad and Tobago) Glamorgan
3	Channon Thompson	29 March 1994	1.81 m (5 ft 11 in)	72 kg (159 lb)	289 cm (114 in)	277 cm (109 in)	(Trinidad and Tobago) UTT
4	Delicia Pierre	11 October 1991	1.80 m (5 ft 11 in)	79 kg (174 lb)	301 cm (119 in)	285 cm (112 in)	(Trinidad and Tobago) West Side Stars
6	Sinead Jack	8 November 1993	1.98 m (6 ft 6 in)	82 kg (181 lb)	310 cm (120 in)	304 cm (120 in)	(Trinidad and Tobago) Technocrats
7	Malika Davidson	6 March 1996	1.75 m (5 ft 9 in)	65 kg (143 lb)	225 cm (89 in)	189 cm (74 in)	(Trinidad and Tobago) West Side Stars
8	Darlene Ramdin	5 August 1989	1.87 m (6 ft 2 in)	89 kg (196 lb)	286 cm (113 in)	281 cm (111 in)	(Trinidad and Tobago) Glamorgan
9	Nya Steele	2 April 2000	1.65 m (5 ft 5 in)	60 kg (130 lb)	285 cm (112 in)	260 cm (100 in)	(Trinidad and Tobago) La Cura
11	Afesha Olton	22 May 1992	1.65 m (5 ft 5 in)	60 kg (130 lb)	200 cm (79 in)	185 cm (73 in)	(Trinidad and Tobago) UTT
12	Renele Forde (c)	6 August 1990	1.90 m (6 ft 3 in)	82 kg (181 lb)	304 cm (120 in)	295 cm (116 in)	(Trinidad and Tobago) Technocrats
14	Rejeanne Wallace	14 May 1996	1.76 m (5 ft 9 in)	76 kg (168 lb)	307 cm (121 in)	301 cm (119 in)	(Trinidad and Tobago) UTT
16	Krystle Esdelle	1 August 1984	1.86 m (6 ft 1 in)	67 kg (148 lb)	329 cm (130 in)	299 cm (118 in)	(Trinidad and Tobago) UTT
19	Kerdisha Sutherland	7 August 1995	1.90 m (6 ft 3 in)	77 kg (170 lb)	294 cm (116 in)	290 cm (110 in)	(Trinidad and Tobago) UTT

=== Venezuela ===
The following is the Venezuelan roster in the 2017 World Grand Prix.

Head coach: Ihosvanny Chambers

No.	Name	Date of birth	Height	Weight	Spike	Block	2016–17 club
1	Yessica Maria Paz Hidalgo	7 October 1989	1.92 m (6 ft 4 in)	72 kg (159 lb)	304 cm (120 in)	300 cm (120 in)	(Venezuela) Aragua
2	Luz Maguy Delfines Melendez	17 May 1991	1.93 m (6 ft 4 in)	75 kg (165 lb)	305 cm (120 in)	301 cm (119 in)	(Venezuela) Zulia
4	Winderlys Gisel Medina Chacoa	2 April 1998	1.85 m (6 ft 1 in)	60 kg (130 lb)	298 cm (117 in)	265 cm (104 in)	
7	Soriana Del Pilar Pacheco Veloz	3 June 1987	1.78 m (5 ft 10 in)	65 kg (143 lb)			
8	Leyna Josefina Morillo Chirinos	12 June 1983	1.83 m (6 ft 0 in)	71 kg (157 lb)	302 cm (119 in)	298 cm (117 in)	(Venezuela) Aragua
9	Sharlin Bidean	19 January 1992	1.88 m (6 ft 2 in)	75 kg (165 lb)	308 cm (121 in)	303 cm (119 in)	(Venezuela) Miranda
10	Desiree Glod (c)	28 September 1982	1.76 m (5 ft 9 in)	64 kg (141 lb)	305 cm (120 in)	301 cm (119 in)	(Venezuela) Miranda
11	Meriyen Serrano	14 December 1997	1.92 m (6 ft 4 in)	66 kg (146 lb)	312 cm (123 in)	305 cm (120 in)	
12	Gheraldine Quijada Teran	31 January 1988	1.79 m (5 ft 10 in)	65 kg (143 lb)	286 cm (113 in)	282 cm (111 in)	(Venezuela) D.C.
13	Shirley Florián	21 July 1991	1.91 m (6 ft 3 in)	67 kg (148 lb)	305 cm (120 in)	301 cm (119 in)	(Venezuela) Zulia
14	Aleoscar Blanco Iriarte	18 July 1987	1.89 m (6 ft 2 in)	75 kg (165 lb)	300 cm (120 in)	296 cm (117 in)	(Venezuela) Vargas
15	Maria Jose Perez Gonzalez	18 March 1988	1.88 m (6 ft 2 in)	69 kg (152 lb)	300 cm (120 in)	296 cm (117 in)	
19	Karyanlys Jose Segura Ramirez	23 September 1999	1.67 m (5 ft 6 in)	58 kg (128 lb)			Lara
21	Lady Yuslemy Urbina Bandres	17 November 1997	1.70 m (5 ft 7 in)	54 kg (119 lb)			(Venezuela) D.C.
