= Feore =

Feore is a surname. Notable people with the surname include:

- Anna Feore (born 1996), Canadian volleyball player
- Colm Feore (born 1958), Canadian actor
- Donna Feore (born 1963), Canadian choreographer and theatre director
