= Dagmar Boom =

Dutch volleyball player

Personal information
- Nationality: Dutch
- Born: 1 May 2000 (age 26); Venray, Netherlands
- Height: 1.84 m (6 ft 0 in)
- Weight: 68 kg (150 lb)
- Spike: 306 cm (120 in)
- Block: 297 cm (117 in)

Volleyball information
- Position: Outside hitter
- Current club: EuroSped
- Number: 6

Career
Years	Teams
2019	Talent Team Papendal

National team
Netherlands
Honours
Women's volleyball
Representing the Netherlands

Dagmar Boom (born 1 May 2000) is a Dutch volleyball player, who plays as a receiver/libero. She is a member of the Women's National Team. She plays for Talent Team Papendal.

She participated in the 2017 Montreux Volley Masters, and 2018 FIVB Volleyball Women's World Championship.
