= Julia Kutyukova =

Russian volleyball player

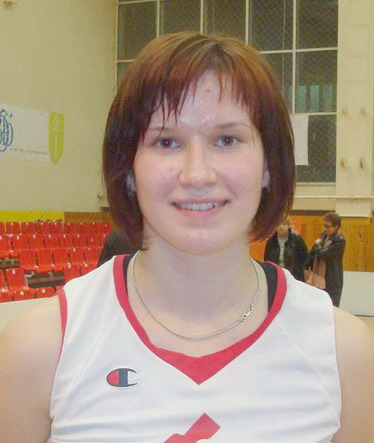

Julia Sergeyevna Kutyukova (Russian: Ю́лия Серге́евна Кутюко́ва; born March 30, 1989, in Lipetsk) is a Russian volleyball player and the attacking Captain VC of Leningradka.

Julia Kutyukova was born and started to practice volleyball in Lipetsk. Julia's mother, Marina Kutyukova, advocated the volleyball team Indesit Lipetsk from 1995 to 2001.

She has performed for the first team since 2008. In the years 2003–2010, Julia Kutyukova was played as VC Stinol (a.k.a. Indesit).

In 2010–2012 she played in Fakel (Novy Urengoy), in 2012–2013 – Severstal (Cherepovets), 2013–2015 – Omichka (Omsk). In 2015, she signed a contract with Leningradka from St. Petersburg.

She was also a bronze medalist in 2014, a silver medalist at the Cup of Russia in 2014 (top scorer of the final round of the draw).

In 2014, she made her debut in the national team of Russia. Its composition took part in two international tournaments -Montreux Volley Masters (3rd place) and Boris Yeltsin Cup (2nd place).
