= Lara Vukasović =

Croatian volleyball player (born 1994)

Personal information
- Born: 10 November 1994 (age 31)
- Height: 1.97 m (6 ft 6 in)
- Spike: 300 cm (120 in)
- Block: 295 cm (116 in)

Volleyball information
- Position: Opposite
- Current club: Hà Phú Thanh Hóa

Career
Years	Teams
2010–2011; 2011–2015; 2016–2017; 2017–2019; 2019–2020; 2020; 2020–2021; 2021–2022; 2022–	HAOK Mladost; California Golden Bears; HAOK Mladost; Paris Saint Cloud; Volleyball Casalmaggiore; HAOK Mladost; CSU Galați; Ladies in Black Aachen; Hà Phú Thanh Hóa

National team
Croatia

Lara Vukasović (born 10 November 1994) is a Croatian volleyball player. She plays as opposite for Vietnamese club Hà Phú Thanh Hóa.
