= Talent Team Papendal =

Dutch volleyball club

TT Papendal / Arnhem
- Full name: Talent Team Papendal Arnhem
- Short name: TTPA
- Ground: National Sports Centre Papendal, Arnhem, Netherlands
- League: Eredivisie Heren (men's); Eredivisie Dames (women's)
- Website: Club home page

Talent Team Papendal (TTPA) is a Dutch volleyball club based in Arnhem. It has men's and women's teams, both playing in the Eredivisie (highest league in the Netherlands).

== History ==
Using the facilities of the Dutch Olympic Committee*Dutch Sports Federation (NOC*NSF) at the National Sports Centre Papendal, the Telent Team Papendal Arnhem was created as men's and women's volleyball teams, both composed of players aged between 14 and 18 years old, who train, study and live in the National Centre. Competing in the country's highest professional league allows the players the opportunity to develop their talents.
