= Anna Feore =

Canadian female volleyball player

Personal information
- Nationality: Canada
- Born: 23 November 1996 (age 29)
- Hometown: Stratford, Ontario
- Height: 1.75 m (5 ft 9 in)
- Spike: 299 cm (118 in)
- Block: 290 cm (110 in)
- Education: Toronto Varsity Blues

Volleyball information
- Position: Libero

National team
2017 – present	Canada
- Last updated: September 20, 2023

Anna Feore (born 23 November 1996) is a Canadian female volleyball player. She was part of the Canada women's national volleyball team and participated at the 2018 FIVB Volleyball Women's World Championship.

She played U Sports volleyball for the University of Toronto Varsity Blues for five seasons from 2014 to 2019 where she was a member of the 2016 national championship team.
