= Lauren Barfield =

American volleyball player

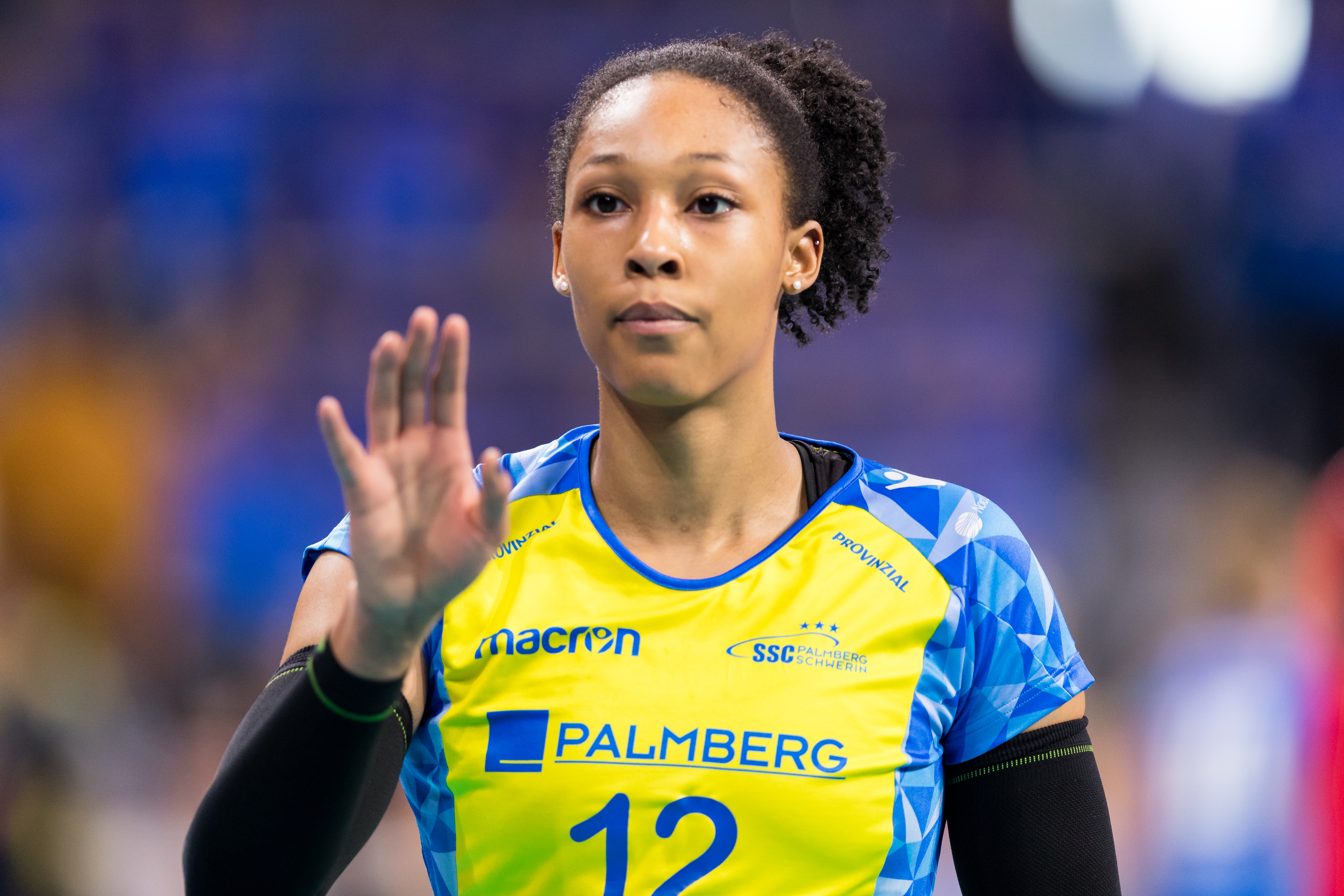
- Barfield in 2019

Personal information
- Nationality: American
- Born: March 15, 1990 (age 36); Tacoma, Washington
- Hometown: Bellevue, WA
- Height: 195 cm (6 ft 5 in)
- Weight: 67 kg (148 lb)
- Spike: 318 cm (125 in)
- Block: 302 cm (119 in)
- Education: University of Washington

Volleyball information
- Position: Middle blocker
- Current club: (Germany) Schweriner SC
- Number: 12

Career
Years	Teams
2008-2011; 2012-2013; 2013-2014; 2014-2016; 2016-	(United States) University of Washington (Austria) ASKÖ Linz-Steg (Poland) LTS Legionovia Legionowo (Germany) Köpenicker SC (Germany) Schweriner SC

Lauren Barfield (born March 15, 1990) is an American volleyball player, a member of the club Schweriner SC.

== Sporting achievements ==
=== Clubs ===
Austrian Championship:

- 2013

German Championship:

- 2017, 2018
- 2019

German SuperCup:

- 2017, 2018

German Cup:

- 2019
