= 2017 Women's European Volleyball Championship squads =

This article shows the rosters of all participating teams at the Women's European Championship 2017 in Baku and Ganja, Azerbaijan and Tbilisi, Georgia.

== Overview ==
Each of the 16 teams submitted a preliminary 'long list' with a maximum of 22 players, for the final tournament a maximum of 14 players from the 'long list' were eligible to compete.

== Key ==
Player positions

- LB – Libero
- MB – Middle Blocker
- OP – Opposite
- OS – Outside Hitter / Spiker
- ST – Setter

== Pool A ==
=== Azerbaijan ===
The following is the Azerbaijan roster in the 2017 Women's European Volleyball Championship. Only the players in bold took part in the final tournament (see 'Overview' section).

Head coach: Faig Garayev

No.	Name	Date of birth	Pos*	Height	Weight	Spike	Block	2016–2017 club
**1**	**Jeyran Aliyeva**	**3 January 1995**	**LB**	**1.65 m (5 ft 5 in)**	**61 kg (134 lb)**	**250 cm (98 in)**	**242 cm (95 in)**	**(Azerbaijan) Azerrail Baku**
**2**	**Kseniya Poznyak**	**21 November 1986**	**MB**	**1.90 m (6 ft 3 in)**	**86 kg (190 lb)**	**305 cm (120 in)**	**300 cm (120 in)**	**(Turkey) Beşiktaş Istanbul**
3	Anastasiya Gurbanova	4 December 1989	OP	1.90 m (6 ft 3 in)	80 kg (180 lb)	305 cm (120 in)	300 cm (120 in)	(Azerbaijan) Azerrail Baku
**5**	**Odina Bayramova (C)**	**22 May 1990**	**OS**	**1.86 m (6 ft 1 in)**	**83 kg (183 lb)**	**315 cm (124 in)**	**303 cm (119 in)**	**(Italy) Il Bisonte Firenze**
**6**	**Ayshan Abdulazimova**	**11 April 1993**	**MB**	**1.84 m (6 ft 0 in)**	**65 kg (143 lb)**	**290 cm (110 in)**	**285 cm (112 in)**	**(Azerbaijan) Azerrail Baku**
**7**	**Olena Hasanova**	**25 November 1995**	**MB**	**1.88 m (6 ft 2 in)**	**72 kg (159 lb)**	**305 cm (120 in)**	**294 cm (116 in)**	**(Azerbaijan) Telekom Baku**
**8**	**Yelyzaveta Samadova**	**3 March 1995**	**OS**	**1.85 m (6 ft 1 in)**	**71 kg (157 lb)**	**310 cm (120 in)**	**295 cm (116 in)**	**(Azerbaijan) Telekom Baku**
**9**	**Natalya Mammadova**	**2 December 1984**	**OS**	**1.96 m (6 ft 5 in)**	**68 kg (150 lb)**	**319 cm (126 in)**	**290 cm (110 in)**	**(Switzerland) Voléro Zürich**
**10**	**Jana Kulan**	**7 July 1987**	**OS**	**1.98 m (6 ft 6 in)**	**87 kg (192 lb)**	**318 cm (125 in)**	**303 cm (119 in)**	**(Turkey) Çanakkale BK**
**11**	**Katerina Zhidkova**	**28 September 1989**	**OP**	**1.87 m (6 ft 2 in)**	**72 kg (159 lb)**	**300 cm (120 in)**	**293 cm (115 in)**	**(Azerbaijan) Azerrail Baku**
**12**	**Valeriya Mammadova**	**29 January 1984**	**LB**	**1.74 m (5 ft 9 in)**	**68 kg (150 lb)**	**286 cm (113 in)**	**280 cm (110 in)**	**(Azerbaijan) Azerrail Baku**
**14**	**Krystsina Yagubova**	**13 February 1996**	**ST**	**1.85 m (6 ft 1 in)**	**72 kg (159 lb)**	**295 cm (116 in)**	**287 cm (113 in)**	**(Azerbaijan) Azerrail Baku**
**15**	**Aynur Karimova**	**7 December 1988**	**MB**	**1.86 m (6 ft 1 in)**	**71 kg (157 lb)**	**295 cm (116 in)**	**290 cm (110 in)**	**(Azerbaijan) Azerrail Baku**
16	Oksana Kiselyova	30 May 1992	LB	1.76 m (5 ft 9 in)	72 kg (159 lb)	280 cm (110 in)	277 cm (109 in)	(Azerbaijan) Lokomotiv Baku
**17**	**Polina Rahimova**	**5 June 1990**	**OP**	**1.98 m (6 ft 6 in)**	**87 kg (192 lb)**	**318 cm (125 in)**	**308 cm (121 in)**	**(Japan) Toyota Auto Body Queenseis**
**18**	**Shafagat Habibova**	**3 August 1991**	**ST**	**1.80 m (5 ft 11 in)**	**74 kg (163 lb)**	**287 cm (113 in)**	**282 cm (111 in)**	**(Azerbaijan) Azerrail Baku**
22	Iuliia Karimova	7 February 1988	OP	1.68 m (5 ft 6 in)	67 kg (148 lb)	250 cm (98 in)	247 cm (97 in)	(Azerbaijan) Bakı Baku

* For players positions, see 'Key' section.

=== Germany ===
The following is the German roster in the 2017 Women's European Volleyball Championship. Only the players in bold took part in the final tournament (see 'Overview' section).

Head coach: Felix Koslowski

No.	Name	Date of birth	Pos*	Height	Weight	Spike	Block	2017–2018 club
**1**	**Lenka Dürr**	**10 December 1990**	**LB**	**1.71 m (5 ft 7 in)**	**59 kg (130 lb)**	**280 cm (110 in)**	**270 cm (110 in)**	**(Romania) CSM Târgoviște**
**2**	**Irina Kemmsies**	**14 May 1996**	**ST**	**1.81 m (5 ft 11 in)**	**65 kg (143 lb)**	**299 cm (118 in)**	**286 cm (113 in)**	**(Germany) VC Wiesbaden**
**3**	**Denise Hanke**	**31 August 1989**	**ST**	**1.79 m (5 ft 10 in)**	**58 kg (128 lb)**	**284 cm (112 in)**	**272 cm (107 in)**	**(Germany) SSC Palmberg Schwerin**
**4**	**Maren Fromm (C)**	**10 July 1986**	**OS**	**1.84 m (6 ft 0 in)**	**68 kg (150 lb)**	**303 cm (119 in)**	**295 cm (116 in)**	**(Turkey) Çanakkale BK**
**5**	**Jana Franziska Poll**	**7 May 1988**	**OS**	**1.85 m (6 ft 1 in)**	**69 kg (152 lb)**	**310 cm (120 in)**	**290 cm (110 in)**	**(Greece) Olympiacos Piraeus**
**6**	**Jennifer Geerties**	**5 April 1994**	**OS**	**1.84 m (6 ft 0 in)**	**58 kg (128 lb)**	**298 cm (117 in)**	**288 cm (113 in)**	**(Germany) SSC Palmberg Schwerin**
**7**	**Jennifer Pettke**	**29 May 1989**	**MB**	**1.87 m (6 ft 2 in)**	**71 kg (157 lb)**	**302 cm (119 in)**	**290 cm (110 in)**	**(Germany) Rote Raben Vilsbiburg**
8	Berit Kauffeldt	8 July 1990	MB	1.90 m (6 ft 3 in)	75 kg (165 lb)	311 cm (122 in)	294 cm (116 in)	(France) Nantes VB
9	Kimberly Drewniok	11 August 1997	OP	1.88 m (6 ft 2 in)	73 kg (161 lb)	311 cm (122 in)	298 cm (117 in)	(Germany) VC Wiesbaden
**10**	**Lena Stigrot**	**20 December 1994**	**OS**	**1.84 m (6 ft 0 in)**	**68 kg (150 lb)**	**303 cm (119 in)**	**295 cm (116 in)**	**(Germany) Rote Raben Vilsbiburg**
**11**	**Louisa Lippmann**	**23 September 1994**	**OP**	**1.91 m (6 ft 3 in)**	**78 kg (172 lb)**	**319 cm (126 in)**	**312 cm (123 in)**	**(Germany) SSC Palmberg Schwerin**
12	Frauke Neuhaus	20 April 1993	OP	1.85 m (6 ft 1 in)	70 kg (150 lb)	300 cm (120 in)	292 cm (115 in)	(Germany) Ladies in Black Aachen
13	Lisa Izquierdo	29 August 1994	OS	1.78 m (5 ft 10 in)	73 kg (161 lb)	309 cm (122 in)	294 cm (116 in)	(Romania) CS Volei Alba-Blaj
**14**	**Marie Schölzel**	**1 August 1997**	**MB**	**1.88 m (6 ft 2 in)**	**66 kg (146 lb)**	**307 cm (121 in)**	**299 cm (118 in)**	**(Germany) SSC Palmberg Schwerin**
15	Lena Möllers	6 January 1990	ST	1.88 m (6 ft 2 in)	74 kg (163 lb)	312 cm (123 in)	297 cm (117 in)	(Romania) CS Volei Alba-Blaj
16	Juliane Langgemach	6 November 1994	MB	1.86 m (6 ft 1 in)	73 kg (161 lb)	295 cm (116 in)	285 cm (112 in)	(Germany) USC Münster
**17**	**Anna Pogany**	**21 July 1994**	**LB**	**1.70 m (5 ft 7 in)**	**60 kg (130 lb)**	**280 cm (110 in)**	**270 cm (110 in)**	**(Switzerland) Sm'Aesch Pfeffingen**
18	Dora Grozer	21 November 1995	OS	1.82 m (6 ft 0 in)	65 kg (143 lb)	302 cm (119 in)	297 cm (117 in)	(Germany) VC Wiesbaden
**19**	**Tanja Großer**	**27 November 1993**	**OS**	**1.78 m (5 ft 10 in)**	**66 kg (146 lb)**	**296 cm (117 in)**	**286 cm (113 in)**	**(Germany) VC Wiesbaden**
**20**	**Leonie Schwertmann**	**12 January 1994**	**MB**	**1.90 m (6 ft 3 in)**	**80 kg (180 lb)**	**300 cm (120 in)**	**290 cm (110 in)**	**(Germany) Rote Raben Vilsbiburg**
21	Barbara Wezorke	12 April 1993	MB	1.85 m (6 ft 1 in)	75 kg (165 lb)	305 cm (120 in)	290 cm (110 in)	(Germany) Dresdner SC
**22**	**Lisa Gründing**	**2 December 1991**	**MB**	**1.85 m (6 ft 1 in)**	**75 kg (165 lb)**	**302 cm (119 in)**	**294 cm (116 in)**	**(Germany) SC Potsdam**

* For players positions, see 'Key' section.

=== Hungary ===
The following is the Hungarian roster in the 2017 Women's European Volleyball Championship. Only the players in bold took part in the final tournament (see 'Overview' section).

Head coach: (Italy) Alberto Salomoni

No.	Name	Date of birth	Pos*	Height	Weight	Spike	Block	2016–2017 club
**1**	**Gréta Szakmáry**	**31 December 1991**	**OS**	**1.85 m (6 ft 1 in)**	**77 kg (170 lb)**	**302 cm (119 in)**	**185 cm (73 in)**	**(Hungary) Linamar-Békéscsabai RSE**
**2**	**Fruzsina Tóth**	**30 December 1999**	**LB**	**1.64 m (5 ft 5 in)**	**61 kg (134 lb)**	**240 cm (94 in)**	**230 cm (91 in)**	**(Hungary) Fatum-Nyíregyháza**
**3**	**Renáta Szpin**	**30 April 1996**	**LB**	**1.72 m (5 ft 8 in)**	**62 kg (137 lb)**	**272 cm (107 in)**	**248 cm (98 in)**	**(Hungary) Linamar-Békéscsabai RSE**
4	Panni Petőváry	12 November 1997	OP	1.86 m (6 ft 1 in)	78 kg (172 lb)	290 cm (110 in)	281 cm (111 in)	(Hungary) MTK Budapest
**5**	**Kata Czina**	**28 April 1994**	**MB**	**1.85 m (6 ft 1 in)**	**76 kg (168 lb)**	**283 cm (111 in)**	**274 cm (108 in)**	**(Hungary) Penta Gödöllői**
6	Réka Szedmák	8 September 2001	MB	1.86 m (6 ft 1 in)	75 kg (165 lb)	287 cm (113 in)	265 cm (104 in)	(Hungary) Vasas SC
7	Brigitta Petrenkó	15 May 2000	ST	1.83 m (6 ft 0 in)	72 kg (159 lb)	280 cm (110 in)	268 cm (106 in)	(Hungary) Linamar-Békéscsabai RSE
**8**	**Zsuzsanna Tálas**	**9 July 1993**	**ST**	**1.74 m (5 ft 9 in)**	**66 kg (146 lb)**	**285 cm (112 in)**	**270 cm (110 in)**	**(Hungary) Linamar-Békéscsabai RSE**
**9**	**Bernadett Dékány**	**30 June 1992**	**OS**	**1.87 m (6 ft 2 in)**	**76 kg (168 lb)**	**301 cm (119 in)**	**280 cm (110 in)**	**(Romania) CSM București**
10	Renáta Sándor	15 December 1990	OS	1.82 m (6 ft 0 in)	72 kg (159 lb)	302 cm (119 in)	290 cm (110 in)	(Germany) Allianz MTV Stuttgart
**11**	**Nikolett Soós**	**17 October 1988**	**OS**	**1.85 m (6 ft 1 in)**	**76 kg (168 lb)**	**292 cm (115 in)**	**273 cm (107 in)**	**(Hungary) Linamar-Békéscsabai RSE**
12	Dóra Kötél	16 June 1988	LB	1.75 m (5 ft 9 in)	61 kg (134 lb)	273 cm (107 in)	264 cm (104 in)	(Hungary) Újpesti TE Budapest
**13**	**Lilla Villám**	**3 June 1997**	**OS**	**1.84 m (6 ft 0 in)**	**79 kg (174 lb)**	**290 cm (110 in)**	**280 cm (110 in)**	**(Hungary) Fatum-Nyíregyháza**
**14**	**Edina Dobi**	**22 October 1987**	**MB**	**1.90 m (6 ft 3 in)**	**70 kg (150 lb)**	**308 cm (121 in)**	**299 cm (118 in)**	**(Azerbaijan) Azerrail Baku**
**15**	**Rita Liliom (C)**	**23 May 1986**	**OS**	**1.84 m (6 ft 0 in)**	**73 kg (161 lb)**	**305 cm (120 in)**	**295 cm (116 in)**	**(France) Béziers VB**
**16**	**Eszter Nagy**	**1 November 1991**	**MB**	**1.86 m (6 ft 1 in)**	**81 kg (179 lb)**	**304 cm (120 in)**	**288 cm (113 in)**	**(Germany) VC Wiesbaden**
**17**	**Réka Bleicher**	**15 October 1995**	**ST**	**1.87 m (6 ft 2 in)**	**70 kg (150 lb)**	**293 cm (115 in)**	**280 cm (110 in)**	**(Hungary) Jászberényi RK**
18	Réka Ludmán	15 January 1997	MB	1.87 m (6 ft 2 in)	75 kg (165 lb)	283 cm (111 in)	265 cm (104 in)	(Hungary) Linamar-Békéscsabai RSE
19	Viktória Nagy	10 May 1996	MB	1.84 m (6 ft 0 in)	70 kg (150 lb)	284 cm (112 in)	259 cm (102 in)	(Hungary) Újpesti TE Budapest
20	Zsanett Kötél	15 July 1986	ST	1.74 m (5 ft 9 in)	70 kg (150 lb)	274 cm (108 in)	264 cm (104 in)	(Hungary) Penta Gödöllői
**21**	**Kata Török**	**26 May 1998**	**OS**	**1.82 m (6 ft 0 in)**	**67 kg (148 lb)**	**287 cm (113 in)**	**261 cm (103 in)**	**(Hungary) Vasas SC**
23	Eszter Anna Pekárik	8 December 1996	MB	1.90 m (6 ft 3 in)	80 kg (180 lb)	280 cm (110 in)	262 cm (103 in)	(Hungary) Vasas SC

* For players positions, see 'Key' section.

=== Poland ===
The following is the Polish roster in the 2017 Women's European Volleyball Championship. Only the players in bold took part in the final tournament (see 'Overview' section).

Head coach: Jacek Nawrocki

No.	Name	Date of birth	Pos*	Height	Weight	Spike	Block	2016–2017 club
**1**	**Maja Tokarska**	**22 February 1991**	**MB**	**1.93 m (6 ft 4 in)**	**72 kg (159 lb)**	**325 cm (128 in)**	**293 cm (115 in)**	**(Japan) Hisamitsu Springs**
2	Gabriela Polańska	27 November 1988	MB	2.02 m (6 ft 8 in)	81 kg (179 lb)	324 cm (128 in)	307 cm (121 in)	(Poland) Grot Budowlani Łódź
3	Klaudia Alagierska	2 January 1996	MB	1.90 m (6 ft 3 in)	76 kg (168 lb)	297 cm (117 in)	290 cm (110 in)	(Poland) Legionovia Legionowo
**4**	**Patrycja Polak**	**23 February 1991**	**OS**	**1.83 m (6 ft 0 in)**	**82 kg (181 lb)**	**307 cm (121 in)**	**295 cm (116 in)**	**(Poland) Giacomini Budowlani Toruń**
**5**	**Agnieszka Kąkolewska**	**17 October 1994**	**MB**	**1.99 m (6 ft 6 in)**	**75 kg (165 lb)**	**309 cm (122 in)**	**295 cm (116 in)**	**(Poland) Impel Wrocław**
6	Alicja Grabka	9 May 1998	ST	1.78 m (5 ft 10 in)	62 kg (137 lb)	290 cm (110 in)	275 cm (108 in)	(Poland) Legionovia Legionowo
**7**	**Natalia Murek**	**8 September 1999**	**OS**	**1.80 m (5 ft 11 in)**	**67 kg (148 lb)**	**302 cm (119 in)**	**290 cm (110 in)**	**(Poland) Pałac Bydgoszcz (Junior)**
8	Maria Stenzel	25 November 1998	LB	1.68 m (5 ft 6 in)	54 kg (119 lb)	286 cm (113 in)	275 cm (108 in)	(Poland) UKS ZSMS Poznań
**9**	**Aleksandra Krzos**	**23 June 1989**	**LB**	**1.71 m (5 ft 7 in)**	**71 kg (157 lb)**	**275 cm (108 in)**	**260 cm (100 in)**	**(Poland) Chemik Police**
**10**	**Zuzanna Efimienko**	**8 August 1989**	**MB**	**1.97 m (6 ft 6 in)**	**72 kg (159 lb)**	**318 cm (125 in)**	**303 cm (119 in)**	**(Italy) Metalleghe Montichiari**
11	Tamara Kaliszuk	20 March 1990	OS	1.81 m (5 ft 11 in)	73 kg (161 lb)	296 cm (117 in)	281 cm (111 in)	(Poland) Tauron MKS Dąbrowa Górnicza
**12**	**Monika Bociek**	**6 April 1996**	**OP**	**1.88 m (6 ft 2 in)**	**74 kg (163 lb)**	**306 cm (120 in)**	**290 cm (110 in)**	**(Poland) Legionovia Legionowo**
**13**	**Agata Witkowska**	**19 August 1989**	**LB**	**1.70 m (5 ft 7 in)**	**62 kg (137 lb)**	**288 cm (113 in)**	**270 cm (110 in)**	**(Italy) Yamamay Busto Arsizio**
**14**	**Joanna Wołosz (C)**	**7 April 1990**	**ST**	**1.81 m (5 ft 11 in)**	**71 kg (157 lb)**	**303 cm (119 in)**	**295 cm (116 in)**	**(Poland) Chemik Police**
**15**	**Martyna Grajber**	**28 March 1995**	**OS**	**1.82 m (6 ft 0 in)**	**70 kg (150 lb)**	**305 cm (120 in)**	**292 cm (115 in)**	**(Poland) Grot Budowlani Łódź**
16	Małgorzata Jasek	14 March 1995	OP	1.91 m (6 ft 3 in)	78 kg (172 lb)	300 cm (120 in)	283 cm (111 in)	(Poland) AZS-AWF Warszawa
**17**	**Malwina Smarzek**	**3 June 1996**	**OP**	**1.91 m (6 ft 3 in)**	**80 kg (180 lb)**	**318 cm (125 in)**	**300 cm (120 in)**	**(Poland) Chemik Police**
**18**	**Julia Twardowska**	**4 May 1995**	**OS**	**1.88 m (6 ft 2 in)**	**75 kg (165 lb)**	**301 cm (119 in)**	**290 cm (110 in)**	**(Poland) Grot Budowlani Łódź**
19	Martyna Łukasik	26 November 1999	OP	1.85 m (6 ft 1 in)	62 kg (137 lb)	300 cm (120 in)	290 cm (110 in)	(Poland) Atom Trefl Sopot
**20**	**Marlena Pleśnierowicz**	**9 January 1992**	**ST**	**1.76 m (5 ft 9 in)**	**61 kg (134 lb)**	**295 cm (116 in)**	**280 cm (110 in)**	**(Poland) Pałac Bydgoszcz**
21	Olivia Różański	5 June 1997	OP	1.84 m (6 ft 0 in)	70 kg (150 lb)	298 cm (117 in)	290 cm (110 in)	(Poland) SMS PZPS Szczyrk
**22**	**Roksana Brzóska**	**2 September 1993**	**OS**	**1.85 m (6 ft 1 in)**	**70 kg (150 lb)**	**300 cm (120 in)**	**290 cm (110 in)**	**(Poland) KSZO Ostrowiec**

* For players positions, see 'Key' section.

== Pool B ==
=== Belarus ===
The following is the Belarusian roster in the 2017 Women's European Volleyball Championship. Only the players in bold took part in the final tournament (see 'Overview' section).

Head coach: Piotr Khilko

No.	Name	Date of birth	Pos*	Height	Weight	Spike	Block	2016–2017 club
**1**	**Aksana Kavalchuk (C)**	**23 November 1979**	**OP**	**1.86 m (6 ft 1 in)**	**78 kg (172 lb)**	**310 cm (120 in)**	**295 cm (116 in)**	**(Belarus) Minchanka Minsk**
**2**	**Volha Palcheuskaya**	**6 December 1984**	**ST**	**1.85 m (6 ft 1 in)**	**64 kg (141 lb)**	**295 cm (116 in)**	**290 cm (110 in)**	**(Belarus) Atlant Baranovichi**
**3**	**Nadzeya Smirnova**	**14 December 1990**	**OS**	**1.80 m (5 ft 11 in)**	**70 kg (150 lb)**	**300 cm (120 in)**	**290 cm (110 in)**	**(Greece) Olympiacos Piraeus**
**4**	**Hanna Kalinouskaya-Güngör**	**17 May 1985**	**MB**	**1.90 m (6 ft 3 in)**	**75 kg (165 lb)**	**318 cm (125 in)**	**305 cm (120 in)**	**(Germany) Ladies in Black Aachen**
5	Vera Klimovich	29 April 1988	MB	1.85 m (6 ft 1 in)	76 kg (168 lb)	300 cm (120 in)	295 cm (116 in)	(Finland) LP Salo
**6**	**Anastasiya Harelik**	**20 March 1991**	**OS**	**1.84 m (6 ft 0 in)**	**74 kg (163 lb)**	**300 cm (120 in)**	**290 cm (110 in)**	**(Russia) Yenisey Krasnoyarsk**
**7**	**Alena Fedarynchyk**	**3 July 1993**	**LB**	**1.78 m (5 ft 10 in)**	**65 kg (143 lb)**	**290 cm (110 in)**	**285 cm (112 in)**	**(Belarus) Minchanka Minsk**
**8**	**Maryna Paulava**	**21 January 1989**	**OS**	**1.80 m (5 ft 11 in)**	**70 kg (150 lb)**	**295 cm (116 in)**	**290 cm (110 in)**	**(Poland) Giacomini Budowlani Toruń**
9	Anastasiya Kananovich	1 May 1993	ST	1.78 m (5 ft 10 in)	73 kg (161 lb)	285 cm (112 in)	280 cm (110 in)	(Belarus) Minchanka Minsk
**10**	**Volha Pauliukouskaya**	**13 July 1988**	**LB**	**1.74 m (5 ft 9 in)**	**63 kg (139 lb)**	**280 cm (110 in)**	**275 cm (108 in)**	**(Poland) KSZO Ostrowiec**
**11**	**Tatsiana Seryk**	**24 September 1992**	**OS**	**1.74 m (5 ft 9 in)**	**63 kg (139 lb)**	**295 cm (116 in)**	**290 cm (110 in)**	**(Belarus) Minchanka Minsk**
**12**	**Hanna Jaafar**	**21 May 1988**	**ST**	**1.73 m (5 ft 8 in)**	**68 kg (150 lb)**	**280 cm (110 in)**	**275 cm (108 in)**	**(Belarus) Zhemchuzhina Polesia Mazyr**
**13**	**Darya Valadzko**	**29 August 1989**	**MB**	**1.86 m (6 ft 1 in)**	**76 kg (168 lb)**	**295 cm (116 in)**	**290 cm (110 in)**	**(Belarus) Zhemchuzhina Polesia Mazyr**
14	Nadzeya Stoliar	11 January 1996	MB	1.82 m (6 ft 0 in)	75 kg (165 lb)	295 cm (116 in)	290 cm (110 in)	(Belarus) Minchanka Minsk
**15**	**Tatsiana Markevich**	**25 March 1988**	**OS**	**1.85 m (6 ft 1 in)**	**64 kg (141 lb)**	**295 cm (116 in)**	**290 cm (110 in)**	**(Romania) CS Volei Alba-Blaj**
**16**	**Anzhelika Barysevich**	**20 July 1995**	**MB**	**1.92 m (6 ft 4 in)**	**83 kg (183 lb)**	**305 cm (120 in)**	**295 cm (116 in)**	**(Belarus) Neman Grodno**
**17**	**Hanna Klimets**	**4 March 1998**	**OP**	**1.85 m (6 ft 1 in)**	**75 kg (165 lb)**	**310 cm (120 in)**	**300 cm (120 in)**	**(Russia) Uralochka-NTMK**
18	Nadzeya Vladyka	2 January 1992	MB	1.90 m (6 ft 3 in)	75 kg (165 lb)	310 cm (120 in)	300 cm (120 in)	(Belarus) Minchanka Minsk
19	Vera Kastsiuchyk	27 September 2000	OP	1.90 m (6 ft 3 in)	69 kg (152 lb)	292 cm (115 in)	275 cm (108 in)	(Belarus) Pribuzhie Brest
20	Kristina Kicka	26 March 1992	OP	1.87 m (6 ft 2 in)	78 kg (172 lb)	300 cm (120 in)	295 cm (116 in)	(Turkey) Trabzon İdmanocağı
21	Hanna Hryshkevich	8 February 2000	OS	1.85 m (6 ft 1 in)	72 kg (159 lb)	285 cm (112 in)	270 cm (110 in)	(Belarus) Minchanka Minsk
22	Yuliya Miniuk	23 May 2000	MB	1.89 m (6 ft 2 in)	75 kg (165 lb)	280 cm (110 in)	232 cm (91 in)	(Belarus) Pribuzhie Brest

* For players positions, see 'Key' section.

=== Croatia ===
The following is the Croatian roster in the 2017 Women's European Volleyball Championship. Only the players in bold took part in the final tournament (see 'Overview' section).

Head coach: Miroslav Aksentijević / Igor Lovrinov

No.	Name	Date of birth	Pos*	Height	Weight	Spike	Block	2016–2017 club
**1**	**Rene Sain**	**23 April 1997**	**LB**	**1.63 m (5 ft 4 in)**	**54 kg (119 lb)**	**264 cm (104 in)**	**235 cm (93 in)**	**(Czech Republic) VK UP Olomouc**
**2**	**Ana Grbac**	**23 March 1988**	**ST**	**1.86 m (6 ft 1 in)**	**82 kg (181 lb)**	**302 cm (119 in)**	**288 cm (113 in)**	**(Romania) CS Volei Alba-Blaj**
**3**	**Nikolina Božičević**	**14 January 1995**	**LB**	**1.67 m (5 ft 6 in)**	**56 kg (123 lb)**	**287 cm (113 in)**	**255 cm (100 in)**	**(Croatia) Marina Kaštela**
4	Božana Butigan	19 August 2000	MB	1.90 m (6 ft 3 in)	78 kg (172 lb)	310 cm (120 in)	303 cm (119 in)	(Croatia) Mladost Zagreb
**5**	**Matea Ikić**	**25 May 1989**	**OS**	**1.86 m (6 ft 1 in)**	**70 kg (150 lb)**	**310 cm (120 in)**	**300 cm (120 in)**	**(Romania) CSM Târgoviște**
6	Katarina Pavičić	17 May 1999	OS	1.80 m (5 ft 11 in)	63 kg (139 lb)	294 cm (116 in)	285 cm (112 in)	(Croatia) ŽOK Osijek
**7**	**Ema Strunjak**	**24 September 1999**	**OP**	**1.88 m (6 ft 2 in)**	**74 kg (163 lb)**	**301 cm (119 in)**	**296 cm (117 in)**	**(Croatia) Mladost Zagreb**
8	Nikolina Jelić	9 November 1991	OS	1.87 m (6 ft 2 in)	63 kg (139 lb)	292 cm (115 in)	285 cm (112 in)	(France) Quimper Volley
**9**	**Marcella Šaini**	**3 October 1992**	**ST**	**1.82 m (6 ft 0 in)**	**72 kg (159 lb)**	**291 cm (115 in)**	**287 cm (113 in)**	**(Belgium) Dauphines Charleroi**
**10**	**Ivana Miloš Prokopić**	**7 March 1986**	**MB**	**1.88 m (6 ft 2 in)**	**73 kg (161 lb)**	**322 cm (127 in)**	**306 cm (120 in)**	**(Turkey) Bursa BBSK**
**11**	**Katarina Barun Šušnjar**	**1 December 1983**	**OP**	**1.94 m (6 ft 4 in)**	**70 kg (150 lb)**	**310 cm (120 in)**	**304 cm (120 in)**	**(Italy) Igor Gorgonzola Novara**
**12**	**Beta Dumančić**	**26 March 1991**	**OS**	**1.90 m (6 ft 3 in)**	**78 kg (172 lb)**	**308 cm (121 in)**	**290 cm (110 in)**	**(Poland) Enea PTPS Piła**
**13**	**Samanta Fabris (C)**	**8 February 1992**	**OP**	**1.90 m (6 ft 3 in)**	**80 kg (180 lb)**	**322 cm (127 in)**	**308 cm (121 in)**	**(Italy) Pomì Casalmaggiore**
**14**	**Nika Stanović**	**2 October 1993**	**OS**	**1.80 m (5 ft 11 in)**	**63 kg (139 lb)**	**295 cm (116 in)**	**290 cm (110 in)**	**(Croatia) OK Kaštela DC**
15	Hana Čutura	10 March 1988	OS	1.90 m (6 ft 3 in)	80 kg (180 lb)	315 cm (124 in)	305 cm (120 in)	(France) Nantes VB
16	Matea Ćurak	19 September 1995	ST	1.86 m (6 ft 1 in)	73 kg (161 lb)	292 cm (115 in)	290 cm (110 in)	(Croatia) Marina Kaštela
**17**	**Bernarda Ćutuk**	**22 December 1990**	**OS**	**1.90 m (6 ft 3 in)**	**75 kg (165 lb)**	**299 cm (118 in)**	**285 cm (112 in)**	**(Czech Republic) VK UP Olomouc**
18	Lea Cvetnić	2 February 1999	OS	1.84 m (6 ft 0 in)	70 kg (150 lb)	305 cm (120 in)	300 cm (120 in)	(Croatia) Marina Kaštela
**19**	**Lucija Mlinar**	**6 May 1995**	**OS**	**1.80 m (5 ft 11 in)**	**71 kg (157 lb)**	**289 cm (114 in)**	**273 cm (107 in)**	**(Belgium) Dauphines Charleroi**
**20**	**Katarina Luketić**	**28 September 1998**	**MB**	**1.90 m (6 ft 3 in)**	**70 kg (150 lb)**	**310 cm (120 in)**	**300 cm (120 in)**	**(Croatia) Mladost Zagreb**
21	Lara Štimac	18 August 2000	ST	1.80 m (5 ft 11 in)	63 kg (139 lb)	295 cm (116 in)	285 cm (112 in)	(Croatia) Mladost Zagreb
22	Ana Matić	8 September 2000	LB	1.68 m (5 ft 6 in)	59 kg (130 lb)	275 cm (108 in)	265 cm (104 in)	(Croatia) Mladost Zagreb

* For players positions, see 'Key' section.

=== Georgia ===
The following is the Georgian roster in the 2017 Women's European Volleyball Championship. Only the players in bold took part in the final tournament (see 'Overview' section).

Head coach: Paata Ulumbelashvili

No.	Name	Date of birth	Pos*	Height	Weight	Spike	Block	2016–2017 club
**1**	**Miriam Gaprindashvili**	**26 April 1998**	**MB**	**1.84 m (6 ft 0 in)**	**66 kg (146 lb)**	**296 cm (117 in)**	**290 cm (110 in)**	**(Poland) Politechniki Śląskiej Gliwice**
**2**	**Nino Koraevi**	**27 June 1998**	**LB**	**1.66 m (5 ft 5 in)**	**63 kg (139 lb)**	**280 cm (110 in)**	**260 cm (100 in)**	**(Georgia (country)) VC Tbilisi**
**3**	**Ana Batsatsashvili**	**2 September 2001**	**OS**	**1.87 m (6 ft 2 in)**	**75 kg (165 lb)**	**305 cm (120 in)**	**290 cm (110 in)**	**(Georgia (country)) VC Tbilisi**
**4**	**Maria Tsarenko**	**12 August 1976**	**MB**	**1.89 m (6 ft 2 in)**	**68 kg (150 lb)**	**310 cm (120 in)**	**300 cm (120 in)**	**(Georgia (country)) VC Tbilisi**
**5**	**Ana Mariam Kipshidze**	**12 May 1990**	**ST**	**1.78 m (5 ft 10 in)**	**73 kg (161 lb)**	**280 cm (110 in)**	**260 cm (100 in)**	**(Georgia (country)) VC Tbilisi**
**6**	**Mariam Beriashvili**	**31 December 2001**	**LB**	**1.89 m (6 ft 2 in)**	**73 kg (161 lb)**	**300 cm (120 in)**	**285 cm (112 in)**	**(Georgia (country)) VC Tbilisi**
**7**	**Gvantsa Ulumbelashvili**	**12 November 1999**	**OS**	**1.89 m (6 ft 2 in)**	**64 kg (141 lb)**	**295 cm (116 in)**	**285 cm (112 in)**	**(Poland) ŁKS Łódź**
**8**	**Julieta Sanadze**	**11 June 1996**	**OS**	**1.75 m (5 ft 9 in)**	**66 kg (146 lb)**	**280 cm (110 in)**	**275 cm (108 in)**	**(Georgia (country)) VC Jiko**
9	Sopio Chomakhidze	25 November 2000	OS	1.85 m (6 ft 1 in)	75 kg (165 lb)	300 cm (120 in)	290 cm (110 in)	(Georgia (country)) VC Jiko
**10**	**Irina Chelidze**	**17 January 1994**	**OS**	**1.79 m (5 ft 10 in)**	**64 kg (141 lb)**	**285 cm (112 in)**	**275 cm (108 in)**	**(Georgia (country)) VC Jiko**
**11**	**Svetlana Sosnovskaya**	**9 February 1995**	**OP**	**1.84 m (6 ft 0 in)**	**64 kg (141 lb)**	**310 cm (120 in)**	**300 cm (120 in)**	**(Georgia (country)) VC Tbilisi**
12	Ketevan Bluashvili	11 September 1999	ST	1.84 m (6 ft 0 in)	75 kg (165 lb)	295 cm (116 in)	280 cm (110 in)	(Georgia (country)) VC Tbilisi
**13**	**Ann Kalandadze**	**10 December 1998**	**OS**	**1.86 m (6 ft 1 in)**	**75 kg (165 lb)**	**310 cm (120 in)**	**300 cm (120 in)**	**(Turkey) Numune DSİ Ankara**
**14**	**Gvantsa Markarashvili**	**14 January 1998**	**ST**	**1.83 m (6 ft 0 in)**	**65 kg (143 lb)**	**290 cm (110 in)**	**280 cm (110 in)**	**(Poland) ŁKS Łódź**
15	Mzia Vashakidze	20 December 1998	OP	1.82 m (6 ft 0 in)	74 kg (163 lb)	290 cm (110 in)	280 cm (110 in)	(Georgia (country)) Sports school (Didi Gikhaishi)
16	Sopio Papiashvili	12 March 1998	LB	1.70 m (5 ft 7 in)	67 kg (148 lb)	265 cm (104 in)	250 cm (98 in)	(Georgia (country)) VC Bolnisi
**17**	**Tinatin Tchautchidze (C)**	**6 December 1991**	**MB**	**1.88 m (6 ft 2 in)**	**74 kg (163 lb)**	**310 cm (120 in)**	**300 cm (120 in)**	**(Georgia (country)) VC Tbilisi**
18	Guranda Kvernadze	5 January 1999	OP	1.87 m (6 ft 2 in)	73 kg (161 lb)	290 cm (110 in)	280 cm (110 in)	(Georgia (country)) VC Batumi
19	Irina Kakhadze	14 October 1990	MB	1.87 m (6 ft 2 in)	79 kg (174 lb)	295 cm (116 in)	285 cm (112 in)	(Georgia (country)) VC Jiko
20	Sopiko Dzidziguri	29 October 1998	OP	1.87 m (6 ft 2 in)	75 kg (165 lb)	295 cm (116 in)	285 cm (112 in)	(Georgia (country)) VC Tbilisi

* For players positions, see 'Key' section.

=== Italy ===
The following is the Italian roster in the 2017 Women's European Volleyball Championship. Only the players in bold took part in the final tournament (see 'Overview' section).

Head coach: Davide Mazzanti

No.	Name	Date of birth	Pos*	Height	Weight	Spike	Block	2016–2017 club
**1**	**Indre Sorokaite**	**2 July 1988**	**OP**	**1.86 m (6 ft 1 in)**	**81 kg (179 lb)**	**310 cm (120 in)**	**238 cm (94 in)**	**(Italy) Il Bisonte Firenze**
2	Serena Ortolani	7 January 1987	OS	1.87 m (6 ft 2 in)	70 kg (150 lb)	312 cm (123 in)	239 cm (94 in)	(Italy) Imoco Volley Conegliano
**3**	**Sara Loda**	**22 August 1990**	**OS**	**1.84 m (6 ft 0 in)**	**74 kg (163 lb)**	**316 cm (124 in)**	**236 cm (93 in)**	**(Italy) Savino Del Bene Scandicci**
**4**	**Sara Bonifacio**	**3 July 1996**	**MB**	**1.86 m (6 ft 1 in)**	**75 kg (165 lb)**	**324 cm (128 in)**	**244 cm (96 in)**	**(Italy) Igor Gorgonzola Novara**
5	Ofelia Malinov	29 February 1996	ST	1.84 m (6 ft 0 in)	67 kg (148 lb)	306 cm (120 in)	233 cm (92 in)	(Italy) Imoco Volley Conegliano
**6**	**Monica De Gennaro**	**8 January 1987**	**LB**	**1.72 m (5 ft 8 in)**	**62 kg (137 lb)**	**298 cm (117 in)**	**215 cm (85 in)**	**(Italy) Imoco Volley Conegliano**
**7**	**Raphaela Folie**	**7 March 1991**	**MB**	**1.85 m (6 ft 1 in)**	**69 kg (152 lb)**	**327 cm (129 in)**	**237 cm (93 in)**	**(Italy) Imoco Volley Conegliano**
**8**	**Alessia Orro**	**18 July 1998**	**ST**	**1.80 m (5 ft 11 in)**	**70 kg (150 lb)**	**308 cm (121 in)**	**231 cm (91 in)**	**(Italy) Club Italia**
**9**	**Caterina Bosetti**	**2 February 1994**	**OS**	**1.77 m (5 ft 10 in)**	**66 kg (146 lb)**	**315 cm (124 in)**	**231 cm (91 in)**	**(Italy) Liu Jo Nordmeccanica Modena**
**10**	**Cristina Chirichella (C)**	**10 February 1994**	**MB**	**1.95 m (6 ft 5 in)**	**76 kg (168 lb)**	**320 cm (130 in)**	**251 cm (99 in)**	**(Italy) Igor Gorgonzola Novara**
**11**	**Anna Danesi**	**20 April 1996**	**MB**	**1.95 m (6 ft 5 in)**	**77 kg (170 lb)**	**315 cm (124 in)**	**246 cm (97 in)**	**(Italy) Imoco Volley Conegliano**
12	Anastasia Guerra	15 October 1996	OS	1.86 m (6 ft 1 in)	73 kg (161 lb)	318 cm (125 in)	238 cm (94 in)	(Italy) Pomì Casalmaggiore
13	Miriam Sylla	8 January 1995	OS	1.84 m (6 ft 0 in)	78 kg (172 lb)	320 cm (130 in)	239 cm (94 in)	(Italy) Foppapedretti Bergamo
**14**	**Valentina Tirozzi**	**26 March 1986**	**OS**	**1.80 m (5 ft 11 in)**	**69 kg (152 lb)**	**309 cm (122 in)**	**229 cm (90 in)**	**(Italy) Pomì Casalmaggiore**
15	Beatrice Berti	12 January 1996	MB	1.93 m (6 ft 4 in)	85 kg (187 lb)	318 cm (125 in)	249 cm (98 in)	(Italy) Yamamay Busto Arsizio
**16**	**Lucia Bosetti**	**9 July 1989**	**OS**	**1.75 m (5 ft 9 in)**	**61 kg (134 lb)**	**319 cm (126 in)**	**225 cm (89 in)**	**(Italy) Pomì Casalmaggiore**
17	Valentina Diouf	10 January 1993	OP	2.02 m (6 ft 8 in)	94 kg (207 lb)	330 cm (130 in)	261 cm (103 in)	(Italy) Yamamay Busto Arsizio
**18**	**Paola Egonu**	**18 December 1998**	**OP**	**1.90 m (6 ft 3 in)**	**79 kg (174 lb)**	**336 cm (132 in)**	**251 cm (99 in)**	**(Italy) Club Italia**
19	Federica Stufi	22 March 1988	MB	1.85 m (6 ft 1 in)	70 kg (150 lb)	321 cm (126 in)	239 cm (94 in)	(Italy) Yamamay Busto Arsizio
**20**	**Beatrice Parrocchiale**	**26 December 1995**	**LB**	**1.67 m (5 ft 6 in)**	**60 kg (130 lb)**	**296 cm (117 in)**	**213 cm (84 in)**	**(Italy) Il Bisonte Firenze**
**21**	**Carlotta Cambi**	**28 May 1996**	**ST**	**1.76 m (5 ft 9 in)**	**67 kg (148 lb)**	**295 cm (116 in)**	**219 cm (86 in)**	**(Italy) Igor Gorgonzola Novara**
22	Chiara De Bortoli	28 July 1997	LB	1.80 m (5 ft 11 in)	68 kg (150 lb)	310 cm (120 in)	225 cm (89 in)	(Italy) Club Italia

* For players positions, see 'Key' section.

== Pool C ==
=== Bulgaria ===
The following is the Bulgarian roster in the 2017 Women's European Volleyball Championship. Only the players in bold took part in the final tournament (see 'Overview' section).

Head coach: Ivan Dimitrov

No.	Name	Date of birth	Pos*	Height	Weight	Spike	Block	2016–2017 club
**1**	**Diana Nenova**	**16 April 1985**	**ST**	**1.82 m (6 ft 0 in)**	**56 kg (123 lb)**	**289 cm (114 in)**	**280 cm (110 in)**	**(Bulgaria) CSKA Sofia**
2	Slavina Koleva	22 November 1986	OS	1.84 m (6 ft 0 in)	63 kg (139 lb)	296 cm (117 in)	288 cm (113 in)	(Slovenia) Calcit Ljubljana
3	Rusena Slancheva	23 August 1986	OS	1.83 m (6 ft 0 in)	62 kg (137 lb)	296 cm (117 in)	284 cm (112 in)	(France) Vandoeuvre Nancy
**4**	**Nasya Dimitrova**	**6 November 1992**	**MB**	**1.89 m (6 ft 2 in)**	**70 kg (150 lb)**	**305 cm (120 in)**	**297 cm (117 in)**	**(Bulgaria) Maritza Plovdiv**
**5**	**Dobriana Rabadžieva**	**14 June 1991**	**OS**	**1.90 m (6 ft 3 in)**	**72 kg (159 lb)**	**304 cm (120 in)**	**293 cm (115 in)**	**(Switzerland) Voléro Zürich**
**6**	**Miroslava Paskova**	**16 February 1996**	**OS**	**1.82 m (6 ft 0 in)**	**66 kg (146 lb)**	**297 cm (117 in)**	**289 cm (114 in)**	**(Bulgaria) Levski Sofia**
**7**	**Lora Kitipova**	**19 May 1991**	**ST**	**1.82 m (6 ft 0 in)**	**63 kg (139 lb)**	**299 cm (118 in)**	**288 cm (113 in)**	**(Russia) Proton Balakovo**
**8**	**Eva Yaneva**	**31 July 1985**	**OS**	**1.86 m (6 ft 1 in)**	**74 kg (163 lb)**	**298 cm (117 in)**	**290 cm (110 in)**	**(Turkey) Sarıyer BSK Istanbul**
9	Petya Barakova	18 June 1994	ST	1.78 m (5 ft 10 in)	75 kg (165 lb)	291 cm (115 in)	283 cm (111 in)	(France) Le Cannet-Rocheville
**10**	**Gergana Dimitrova**	**28 February 1996**	**OS**	**1.85 m (6 ft 1 in)**	**70 kg (150 lb)**	**300 cm (120 in)**	**291 cm (115 in)**	**(France) RC Cannes**
**11**	**Hristina Ruseva**	**1 October 1991**	**MB**	**1.90 m (6 ft 3 in)**	**73 kg (161 lb)**	**300 cm (120 in)**	**291 cm (115 in)**	**(Turkey) Galatasaray Istanbul**
**12**	**Mariya Dancheva**	**4 December 1995**	**MB**	**1.91 m (6 ft 3 in)**	**70 kg (150 lb)**	**306 cm (120 in)**	**295 cm (116 in)**	**(Bulgaria) Maritza Plovdiv**
**13**	**Mariya Filipova**	**10 September 1982**	**LB**	**1.78 m (5 ft 10 in)**	**65 kg (143 lb)**	**290 cm (110 in)**	**282 cm (111 in)**	**(Azerbaijan) Telekom Baku**
**14**	**Emiliya Dimitrova**	**26 December 1991**	**OP**	**1.85 m (6 ft 1 in)**	**59 kg (130 lb)**	**299 cm (118 in)**	**280 cm (110 in)**	**(Japan) NEC Red Rockets**
**15**	**Zhana Todorova**	**6 January 1997**	**LB**	**1.76 m (5 ft 9 in)**	**53 kg (117 lb)**	**278 cm (109 in)**	**269 cm (106 in)**	**(Bulgaria) Maritza Plovdiv**
**16**	**Elitsa Vasileva (C)**	**13 May 1990**	**OS**	**1.90 m (6 ft 3 in)**	**73 kg (161 lb)**	**307 cm (121 in)**	**298 cm (117 in)**	**(Russia) Dinamo Kazan**
**17**	**Strashimira Simeonova**	**18 August 1985**	**MB**	**1.95 m (6 ft 5 in)**	**70 kg (150 lb)**	**306 cm (120 in)**	**297 cm (117 in)**	**(Bulgaria) Slavia Sofia**
18	Kathryn Dimitrova	27 November 1999	OP	1.91 m (6 ft 3 in)	73 kg (161 lb)	299 cm (118 in)	289 cm (114 in)	(Bulgaria) Levski Sofia
19	Silvana Chausheva	19 May 1995	OP	1.88 m (6 ft 2 in)	74 kg (163 lb)	299 cm (118 in)	291 cm (115 in)	(Bulgaria) Maritza Plovdiv
20	Kristina Guncheva	24 March 1994	ST	1.78 m (5 ft 10 in)	63 kg (139 lb)	280 cm (110 in)	275 cm (108 in)	(Switzerland) Volley Köniz
21	Iveta Stanchulova	11 August 1997	MB	1.87 m (6 ft 2 in)	67 kg (148 lb)	296 cm (117 in)	288 cm (113 in)	(Bulgaria) CSKA Sofia
22	Elitsa Barakova	11 March 1997	MB	1.85 m (6 ft 1 in)	63 kg (139 lb)	292 cm (115 in)	285 cm (112 in)	(Bulgaria) Kazanlak Volley

* For players positions, see 'Key' section.

=== Russia ===
The following is the Russian roster in the 2017 Women's European Volleyball Championship. Only the players in bold took part in the final tournament (see 'Overview' section).

Head coach: Vladimir Kuzyutkin / Konstantin Ushakov

No.	Name	Date of birth	Pos*	Height	Weight	Spike	Block	2016–2017 club
**1**	**Yana Shcherban**	**6 September 1989**	**OS**	**1.85 m (6 ft 1 in)**	**71 kg (157 lb)**	**298 cm (117 in)**	**294 cm (116 in)**	**(Russia) Dinamo Moscow**
**2**	**Maria Frolova**	**1 November 1986**	**OS**	**1.78 m (5 ft 10 in)**	**62 kg (137 lb)**	**297 cm (117 in)**	**289 cm (114 in)**	**(Russia) Yenisey Krasnoyarsk**
**3**	**Irina Filishtinskaya**	**14 June 1990**	**ST**	**1.70 m (5 ft 7 in)**	**65 kg (143 lb)**	**285 cm (112 in)**	**275 cm (108 in)**	**(Russia) Dinamo Kazan**
**4**	**Svetlana Kryuchkova**	**21 February 1985**	**LB**	**1.74 m (5 ft 9 in)**	**63 kg (139 lb)**	**290 cm (110 in)**	**286 cm (113 in)**	**(Russia) Yenisey Krasnoyarsk**
5	Yulia Kutyukova	30 March 1989	OS	1.83 m (6 ft 0 in)	74 kg (163 lb)	305 cm (120 in)	299 cm (118 in)	(Russia) Leningradka Saint Petersburg
**6**	**Irina Zaryazhko**	**4 October 1991**	**MB**	**1.96 m (6 ft 5 in)**	**78 kg (172 lb)**	**305 cm (120 in)**	**290 cm (110 in)**	**(Russia) Dinamo Kazan**
7	Anna Lazareva	31 January 1997	OS	1.90 m (6 ft 3 in)	67 kg (148 lb)	315 cm (124 in)	300 cm (120 in)	(Russia) Yenisey Krasnoyarsk
**8**	**Nataliya Goncharova**	**1 June 1989**	**OP**	**1.94 m (6 ft 4 in)**	**75 kg (165 lb)**	**315 cm (124 in)**	**306 cm (120 in)**	**(Russia) Dinamo Moscow**
9	Ekaterina Karpol	15 January 1994	LB	1.75 m (5 ft 9 in)	62 kg (137 lb)	287 cm (113 in)	270 cm (110 in)	(Russia) Uralochka-NTMK
**10**	**Ekaterina Pankova (C)**	**2 February 1990**	**ST**	**1.78 m (5 ft 10 in)**	**64 kg (141 lb)**	**290 cm (110 in)**	**285 cm (112 in)**	**(Russia) Dinamo Moscow**
**11**	**Ekaterina Tretyakova**	**19 October 1984**	**LB**	**1.76 m (5 ft 9 in)**	**65 kg (143 lb)**	**301 cm (119 in)**	**292 cm (115 in)**	**(Russia) Dinamo Krasnodar**
12	Alla Galkina	15 April 1992	LB	1.78 m (5 ft 10 in)	65 kg (143 lb)	295 cm (116 in)	290 cm (110 in)	(Russia) Yenisey Krasnoyarsk
13	Anna Kotikova	13 October 1999	OS	1.86 m (6 ft 1 in)	65 kg (143 lb)	296 cm (117 in)	287 cm (113 in)	(Russia) Dinamo Kazan
**14**	**Irina Fetisova**	**7 September 1994**	**MB**	**1.90 m (6 ft 3 in)**	**76 kg (168 lb)**	**307 cm (121 in)**	**286 cm (113 in)**	**(Russia) Dinamo Moscow**
**15**	**Tatiana Kosheleva**	**23 December 1988**	**OP**	**1.91 m (6 ft 3 in)**	**67 kg (148 lb)**	**315 cm (124 in)**	**305 cm (120 in)**	**(Turkey) Eczacibasi VitrA Istanbul**
**16**	**Irina Voronkova**	**20 October 1995**	**OP**	**1.90 m (6 ft 3 in)**	**84 kg (185 lb)**	**305 cm (120 in)**	**290 cm (110 in)**	**(Russia) Dinamo Kazan**
17	Ekaterina Polyakova	6 February 1987	MB	1.95 m (6 ft 5 in)	70 kg (150 lb)	308 cm (121 in)	302 cm (119 in)	(Russia) Leningradka Saint Petersburg
**18**	**Ksenia Parubets**	**31 October 1994**	**OS**	**1.83 m (6 ft 0 in)**	**64 kg (141 lb)**	**300 cm (120 in)**	**286 cm (113 in)**	**(Russia) Uralochka-NTMK**
**19**	**Ekaterina Evdokimova**	**10 September 1994**	**MB**	**1.90 m (6 ft 3 in)**	**73 kg (161 lb)**	**306 cm (120 in)**	**285 cm (112 in)**	**(Russia) Uralochka-NTMK**
20	Angelina Sperskaite	11 February 1997	OS	1.88 m (6 ft 2 in)	72 kg (159 lb)	305 cm (120 in)	295 cm (116 in)	(Russia) Zarechie Odintsovo
**21**	**Ekaterina Efimova**	**3 July 1993**	**MB**	**1.92 m (6 ft 4 in)**	**70 kg (150 lb)**	**305 cm (120 in)**	**295 cm (116 in)**	**(Russia) Yenisey Krasnoyarsk**
22	Tatiana Romanova	9 September 1994	ST	1.78 m (5 ft 10 in)	64 kg (141 lb)	292 cm (115 in)	285 cm (112 in)	(Russia) Zarechie Odintsovo

* For players positions, see 'Key' section.

=== Turkey ===
The following is the Turkish roster in the 2017 Women's European Volleyball Championship. Only the players in bold took part in the final tournament (see 'Overview' section).

Head coach: (Italy) Giovanni Guidetti

No.	Name	Date of birth	Pos*	Height	Weight	Spike	Block	2016–2017 club
**1**	**Hatice Gizem Örge**	**26 April 1993**	**LB**	**1.70 m (5 ft 7 in)**	**59 kg (130 lb)**	**270 cm (110 in)**	**260 cm (100 in)**	**(Turkey) Vakıfbank Istanbul**
**2**	**Gözde Kırdar**	**26 June 1985**	**OS**	**1.83 m (6 ft 0 in)**	**70 kg (150 lb)**	**309 cm (122 in)**	**300 cm (120 in)**	**(Turkey) Vakıfbank Istanbul**
**3**	**Kübra Akman Çalışkan**	**13 October 1994**	**MB**	**1.97 m (6 ft 6 in)**	**89 kg (196 lb)**	**320 cm (130 in)**	**310 cm (120 in)**	**(Turkey) Vakıfbank Istanbul**
4	Çağla Akın	19 January 1995	ST	1.77 m (5 ft 10 in)	70 kg (150 lb)	300 cm (120 in)	280 cm (110 in)	(Turkey) Beşiktaş Istanbul
5	Melis Durul	21 October 1993	OP	1.85 m (6 ft 1 in)	74 kg (163 lb)	306 cm (120 in)	299 cm (118 in)	(Turkey) Vakıfbank Istanbul
**6**	**Simge Şebnem Aköz**	**23 April 1991**	**LB**	**1.68 m (5 ft 6 in)**	**55 kg (121 lb)**	**250 cm (98 in)**	**245 cm (96 in)**	**(Turkey) Eczacıbaşı VitrA Istanbul**
7	Tuğba Şenoğlu	2 February 1998	OS	1.84 m (6 ft 0 in)	64 kg (141 lb)	275 cm (108 in)	270 cm (110 in)	(Turkey) Beşiktaş Istanbul
**8**	**Bahar Toksoy Guidetti**	**6 February 1988**	**MB**	**1.90 m (6 ft 3 in)**	**75 kg (165 lb)**	**316 cm (124 in)**	**308 cm (121 in)**	**(Turkey) Fenerbahçe Istanbul**
9	Dicle Nur Babat	15 September 1992	MB	1.90 m (6 ft 3 in)	78 kg (172 lb)	310 cm (120 in)	300 cm (120 in)	(Turkey) Fenerbahçe Istanbul
**10**	**Güldeniz Önal**	**25 March 1986**	**OS**	**1.83 m (6 ft 0 in)**	**75 kg (165 lb)**	**303 cm (119 in)**	**295 cm (116 in)**	**(Turkey) Galatasaray Istanbul**
**11**	**Naz Aydemir Akyol**	**14 August 1990**	**ST**	**1.90 m (6 ft 3 in)**	**70 kg (150 lb)**	**303 cm (119 in)**	**298 cm (117 in)**	**(Turkey) Vakıfbank Istanbul**
**12**	**Merve Dalbeler**	**27 June 1987**	**LB**	**1.65 m (5 ft 5 in)**	**60 kg (130 lb)**	**280 cm (110 in)**	**270 cm (110 in)**	**(Turkey) Fenerbahçe Istanbul**
**13**	**Neriman Özsoy**	**13 July 1988**	**OS**	**1.88 m (6 ft 2 in)**	**76 kg (168 lb)**	**311 cm (122 in)**	**306 cm (120 in)**	**(Italy) Liu Jo Nordmeccanica Modena**
**14**	**Eda Erdem Dündar (C)**	**22 June 1987**	**MB**	**1.88 m (6 ft 2 in)**	**73 kg (161 lb)**	**299 cm (118 in)**	**292 cm (115 in)**	**(Turkey) Fenerbahçe Istanbul**
**15**	**Hande Baladın**	**1 September 1997**	**OS**	**1.89 m (6 ft 2 in)**	**71 kg (157 lb)**	**310 cm (120 in)**	**300 cm (120 in)**	**(Turkey) Eczacıbaşı VitrA Istanbul**
**16**	**Polen Uslupehlivan**	**27 August 1990**	**OP**	**1.93 m (6 ft 4 in)**	**65 kg (143 lb)**	**311 cm (122 in)**	**301 cm (119 in)**	**(Turkey) Fenerbahçe Istanbul**
17	Neslihan Demir Güler	9 December 1983	OP	1.87 m (6 ft 2 in)	72 kg (159 lb)	309 cm (122 in)	300 cm (120 in)	(Turkey) Galatasaray Istanbul
**18**	**Gamze Alikaya**	**1 January 1993**	**ST**	**1.79 m (5 ft 10 in)**	**68 kg (150 lb)**	**300 cm (120 in)**	**280 cm (110 in)**	**(Turkey) Galatasaray Istanbul**
19	Meliha İsmailoğlu	17 September 1993	OS	1.88 m (6 ft 2 in)	70 kg (150 lb)	301 cm (119 in)	294 cm (116 in)	(Turkey) Fenerbahçe Istanbul
20	Cansu Özbay	17 October 1996	ST	1.82 m (6 ft 0 in)	75 kg (165 lb)	285 cm (112 in)	284 cm (112 in)	(Turkey) Vakıfbank Istanbul
**21**	**Meryem Boz**	**3 February 1988**	**OS**	**1.94 m (6 ft 4 in)**	**63 kg (139 lb)**	**318 cm (125 in)**	**310 cm (120 in)**	**(Turkey) Seramiksan Turgutlu**
22	Beyza Arıcı	27 July 1995	MB	1.92 m (6 ft 4 in)	82 kg (181 lb)	299 cm (118 in)	289 cm (114 in)	(Turkey) Çanakkale BK

* For players positions, see 'Key' section.

=== Ukraine ===
The following is the Ukrainian roster in the 2017 Women's European Volleyball Championship. Only the players in bold took part in the final tournament (see 'Overview' section).

Head coach: Gariy Yegiazarov

No.	Name	Date of birth	Pos*	Height	Weight	Spike	Block	2016–2017 club
1	Kateryna Dudnyk	30 December 1995	OS	1.88 m (6 ft 2 in)	75 kg (165 lb)	310 cm (120 in)	285 cm (112 in)	(Ukraine) Khimik Yuzhny
2	Maryna Degtiarova	22 November 1993	ST	1.85 m (6 ft 1 in)	67 kg (148 lb)	305 cm (120 in)	295 cm (116 in)	(Israel) Maccabi Ironi Hadera
**3**	**Iryna Trushkina**	**3 December 1986**	**MB**	**1.88 m (6 ft 2 in)**	**67 kg (148 lb)**	**307 cm (121 in)**	**298 cm (117 in)**	**(Turkey) Nilüfer Bursa**
**4**	**Tetyana Kozlova**	**25 September 1984**	**OS**	**1.85 m (6 ft 1 in)**	**67 kg (148 lb)**	**310 cm (120 in)**	**300 cm (120 in)**	**(Turkey) Nilüfer Bursa**
**5**	**Karyna Denysova**	**28 December 1997**	**OP**	**1.84 m (6 ft 0 in)**	**72 kg (159 lb)**	**305 cm (120 in)**	**281 cm (111 in)**	**(Ukraine) Severodonchanka Severodonetsk**
**6**	**Viktoriya Delros**	**12 May 1993**	**LB**	**1.72 m (5 ft 8 in)**	**60 kg (130 lb)**	**275 cm (108 in)**	**265 cm (104 in)**	**(France) Le Cannet-Rocheville**
**7**	**Inna Molodtsova**	**8 May 1986**	**MB**	**1.86 m (6 ft 1 in)**	**74 kg (163 lb)**	**310 cm (120 in)**	**300 cm (120 in)**	**(Ukraine) Khimik Yuzhny**
**8**	**Anastasiia Chernukha**	**15 April 1995**	**OP**	**1.93 m (6 ft 4 in)**	**75 kg (165 lb)**	**305 cm (120 in)**	**300 cm (120 in)**	**(Ukraine) Khimik Yuzhny**
**9**	**Yuliya Gerasymova**	**15 September 1989**	**MB**	**1.85 m (6 ft 1 in)**	**76 kg (168 lb)**	**290 cm (110 in)**	**275 cm (108 in)**	**(Turkey) TED Kolejliler Ankara**
**10**	**Hanna Kyrychenko**	**26 February 1991**	**OS**	**1.87 m (6 ft 2 in)**	**83 kg (183 lb)**	**305 cm (120 in)**	**296 cm (117 in)**	**(Israel) Maccabi XT Haifa**
**11**	**Anna Stepaniuk**	**31 October 1992**	**OS**	**1.80 m (5 ft 11 in)**	**70 kg (150 lb)**	**300 cm (120 in)**	**280 cm (110 in)**	**(Indonesia) Jakarta Pertamina Energi**
**12**	**Alina Stepanchuk**	**1 October 1991**	**LB**	**1.75 m (5 ft 9 in)**	**64 kg (141 lb)**	**276 cm (109 in)**	**266 cm (105 in)**	**(Ukraine) Khimik Yuzhny**
**13**	**Olena Novgorodchenko**	**5 February 1988**	**ST**	**1.80 m (5 ft 11 in)**	**73 kg (161 lb)**	**292 cm (115 in)**	**283 cm (111 in)**	**(Poland) Wisła Warszawa**
14	Krystyna Niemtseva	15 June 1998	LB	1.64 m (5 ft 5 in)	57 kg (126 lb)	265 cm (104 in)	250 cm (98 in)	(Ukraine) Khimik Yuzhny
**16**	**Nadiia Kodola (C)**	**29 September 1988**	**OS**	**1.84 m (6 ft 0 in)**	**73 kg (161 lb)**	**299 cm (118 in)**	**289 cm (114 in)**	**(France) RC Cannes**
**17**	**Svitlana Dorsman**	**11 December 1993**	**MB**	**1.84 m (6 ft 0 in)**	**71 kg (157 lb)**	**300 cm (120 in)**	**290 cm (110 in)**	**(Azerbaijan) Azeryol Baku**
**18**	**Oleksandra Peretiatko**	**11 April 1984**	**ST**	**1.82 m (6 ft 0 in)**	**65 kg (143 lb)**	**275 cm (108 in)**	**260 cm (100 in)**	**(Russia) Yenisey Krasnoyarsk**
19	Diana Karpets	6 August 1996	MB	1.89 m (6 ft 2 in)	75 kg (165 lb)	310 cm (120 in)	295 cm (116 in)	(Ukraine) Khimik Yuzhny
21	Olesia Rykhliuk	11 December 1987	OP	1.94 m (6 ft 4 in)	78 kg (172 lb)	310 cm (120 in)	300 cm (120 in)	(Switzerland) Voléro Zürich
22	Alla Politanska	27 September 1988	ST	1.84 m (6 ft 0 in)	63 kg (139 lb)	277 cm (109 in)	265 cm (104 in)	(Ukraine) Khimik Yuzhny

* For players positions, see 'Key' section.

== Pool D ==
=== Belgium ===
The following is the Belgian roster in the 2017 Women's European Volleyball Championship. Only the players in bold took part in the final tournament (see 'Overview' section).

Head coach: Gert Vande Broek

No.	Name	Date of birth	Pos*	Height	Weight	Spike	Block	2016–2017 club
1	Laure Flament	18 June 1998	OS	1.82 m (6 ft 0 in)	76 kg (168 lb)	295 cm (116 in)	282 cm (111 in)	(Belgium) VDK Gent Dames
**2**	**Jasmien Biebauw**	**24 September 1990**	**ST**	**1.80 m (5 ft 11 in)**	**80 kg (180 lb)**	**301 cm (119 in)**	**282 cm (111 in)**	**(Belgium) Asterix Avo Beveren**
**3**	**Britt Herbots**	**24 September 1999**	**OP**	**1.84 m (6 ft 0 in)**	**64 kg (141 lb)**	**310 cm (120 in)**	**290 cm (110 in)**	**(Belgium) Asterix Avo Beveren**
**4**	**Valérie Courtois**	**1 November 1990**	**LB**	**1.71 m (5 ft 7 in)**	**68 kg (150 lb)**	**282 cm (111 in)**	**271 cm (107 in)**	**(Germany) Dresdner SC**
**5**	**Laura Heyrman**	**17 May 1993**	**MB**	**1.89 m (6 ft 2 in)**	**72 kg (159 lb)**	**311 cm (122 in)**	**293 cm (115 in)**	**(Italy) Liu Jo Nordmeccanica Modena**
**6**	**Charlotte Leys (C)**	**18 March 1989**	**OS**	**1.86 m (6 ft 1 in)**	**77 kg (170 lb)**	**303 cm (119 in)**	**285 cm (112 in)**	**(Turkey) Galatasaray Istanbul**
**7**	**Celine Van Gestel**	**7 November 1997**	**OS**	**1.83 m (6 ft 0 in)**	**74 kg (163 lb)**	**304 cm (120 in)**	**284 cm (112 in)**	**(Belgium) Asterix Avo Beveren**
**8**	**Kaja Grobelna**	**4 January 1995**	**OP**	**1.88 m (6 ft 2 in)**	**71 kg (157 lb)**	**318 cm (125 in)**	**295 cm (116 in)**	**(Poland) Grot Budowlani Łódź**
**9**	**Freya Aelbrecht**	**10 February 1990**	**MB**	**1.86 m (6 ft 1 in)**	**82 kg (181 lb)**	**311 cm (122 in)**	**294 cm (116 in)**	**(Italy) Saugella Team Monza**
**10**	**Lise Van Hecke**	**1 July 1992**	**OP**	**1.85 m (6 ft 1 in)**	**79 kg (174 lb)**	**305 cm (120 in)**	**289 cm (114 in)**	**(Turkey) Beşiktaş Istanbul**
11	Els Vandesteene	30 May 1987	OS	1.86 m (6 ft 1 in)	74 kg (163 lb)	301 cm (119 in)	285 cm (112 in)	(France) Nantes VB
12	Dominika Strumilo	26 December 1996	OS	1.87 m (6 ft 2 in)	69 kg (152 lb)	311 cm (122 in)	292 cm (115 in)	(Germany) Dresdner SC
**13**	**Marlies Janssens**	**4 June 1997**	**MB**	**1.93 m (6 ft 4 in)**	**79 kg (174 lb)**	**312 cm (123 in)**	**299 cm (118 in)**	**(Belgium) VC Oudegem**
14	Hélène Rousseaux	25 September 1991	OS	1.89 m (6 ft 2 in)	74 kg (163 lb)	311 cm (122 in)	290 cm (110 in)	(Turkey) Beşiktaş Istanbul
15	Margo Voets	10 September 1995	LB	1.67 m (5 ft 6 in)	71 kg (157 lb)	290 cm (110 in)	282 cm (111 in)	(Belgium) VC Oudegem
16	Elise Van Sas	1 August 1997	ST	1.88 m (6 ft 2 in)	74 kg (163 lb)	296 cm (117 in)	281 cm (111 in)	(Belgium) VC Oudegem
**17**	**Ilka Van de Vyver**	**26 January 1993**	**ST**	**1.70 m (5 ft 7 in)**	**79 kg (174 lb)**	**294 cm (116 in)**	**278 cm (109 in)**	**(Slovenia) Calcit Ljubljana**
18	Iris Vandewiele	7 March 1994	MB	1.90 m (6 ft 3 in)	72 kg (159 lb)	309 cm (122 in)	290 cm (110 in)	(Belgium) VDK Gent Dames
**19**	**Nathalie Lemmens**	**12 March 1995**	**MB**	**1.92 m (6 ft 4 in)**	**78 kg (172 lb)**	**311 cm (122 in)**	**290 cm (110 in)**	**(Belgium) Asterix Avo Beveren**
**20**	**Jodie Guilliams**	**26 April 1997**	**OS**	**1.80 m (5 ft 11 in)**	**73 kg (161 lb)**	**305 cm (120 in)**	**289 cm (114 in)**	**(Belgium) VC Oudegem**
**21**	**Amber De Tant**	**22 March 1998**	**LB**	**1.77 m (5 ft 10 in)**	**66 kg (146 lb)**	**296 cm (117 in)**	**280 cm (110 in)**	**(Belgium) Asterix Avo Beveren**
22	Lisa Neyt	2 September 1993	LB	1.75 m (5 ft 9 in)	71 kg (157 lb)	282 cm (111 in)	271 cm (107 in)	(Belgium) VDK Gent Dames

* For players positions, see 'Key' section.

=== Czech Republic ===
The following is the Czech roster in the 2017 Women's European Volleyball Championship. Only the players in bold took part in the final tournament (see 'Overview' section).

Head coach: Zdeněk Pommer

No.	Name	Date of birth	Pos*	Height	Weight	Spike	Block	2016–2017 club
**1**	**Andrea Kossanyiová**	**6 August 1993**	**OS**	**1.86 m (6 ft 1 in)**	**72 kg (159 lb)**	**310 cm (120 in)**	**300 cm (120 in)**	**(Poland) Impel Wrocław**
2	Helena Kojdová	12 May 1991	OS	1.80 m (5 ft 11 in)	65 kg (143 lb)	300 cm (120 in)	292 cm (115 in)	(Switzerland) TS Volley Düdingen
**3**	**Kateřina Kohoutová**	**30 June 1992**	**MB**	**1.82 m (6 ft 0 in)**	**66 kg (146 lb)**	**305 cm (120 in)**	**292 cm (115 in)**	**(Czech Republic) Volejbal Přerov**
**4**	**Aneta Havlíčková (C)**	**3 July 1987**	**OP**	**1.90 m (6 ft 3 in)**	**96 kg (212 lb)**	**316 cm (124 in)**	**300 cm (120 in)**	**(Italy) Savino Del Bene Scandicci**
5	Julie Kovářová	14 September 1987	LB	1.79 m (5 ft 10 in)	62 kg (137 lb)	290 cm (110 in)	278 cm (109 in)	(Czech Republic) Agel Prostějov
6	Lucie Smutná	14 April 1991	ST	1.80 m (5 ft 11 in)	75 kg (165 lb)	307 cm (121 in)	285 cm (112 in)	(Germany) Dresdner SC
**7**	**Iva Nachmilnerová**	**20 September 1988**	**MB**	**1.91 m (6 ft 3 in)**	**83 kg (183 lb)**	**312 cm (123 in)**	**301 cm (119 in)**	**(Czech Republic) TJ Ostrava**
**8**	**Barbora Purchartová**	**9 May 1992**	**MB**	**1.89 m (6 ft 2 in)**	**81 kg (179 lb)**	**310 cm (120 in)**	**300 cm (120 in)**	**(Germany) Dresdner SC**
9	Gabriela Kopáčová	24 June 1998	OP	1.85 m (6 ft 1 in)	78 kg (172 lb)	320 cm (130 in)	300 cm (120 in)	(Czech Republic) Královo Pole Brno
**10**	**Kateřina Valková**	**6 February 1996**	**ST**	**1.77 m (5 ft 10 in)**	**56 kg (123 lb)**	**288 cm (113 in)**	**275 cm (108 in)**	**(Czech Republic) TJ Ostrava**
**11**	**Veronika Dostálová**	**7 April 1992**	**LB**	**1.70 m (5 ft 7 in)**	**66 kg (146 lb)**	**278 cm (109 in)**	**269 cm (106 in)**	**(Czech Republic) Olymp Prague**
**12**	**Michaela Mlejnková**	**26 July 1996**	**OS**	**1.85 m (6 ft 1 in)**	**75 kg (165 lb)**	**305 cm (120 in)**	**298 cm (117 in)**	**(Germany) Allianz MTV Stuttgart**
13	Karolína Bednářová	20 July 1986	OS	1.81 m (5 ft 11 in)	67 kg (148 lb)	303 cm (119 in)	290 cm (110 in)	(Germany) VC Wiesbaden
14	Klára Vyklická	3 June 1993	MB	1.84 m (6 ft 0 in)	73 kg (161 lb)	305 cm (120 in)	295 cm (116 in)	(Czech Republic) Olymp Prague
**15**	**Veronika Strušková**	**13 August 1991**	**MB**	**1.82 m (6 ft 0 in)**	**78 kg (172 lb)**	**303 cm (119 in)**	**291 cm (115 in)**	**(Czech Republic) VK UP Olomouc**
**16**	**Helena Havelková**	**25 July 1988**	**OS**	**1.86 m (6 ft 1 in)**	**70 kg (150 lb)**	**320 cm (130 in)**	**300 cm (120 in)**	**(China) Shanghai**
**17**	**Nikola Vaňková**	**7 January 1998**	**LB**	**1.69 m (5 ft 7 in)**	**65 kg (143 lb)**	**290 cm (110 in)**	**275 cm (108 in)**	**(Czech Republic) Královo Pole Brno**
**18**	**Pavla Vincourová**	**12 November 1992**	**ST**	**1.80 m (5 ft 11 in)**	**68 kg (150 lb)**	**297 cm (117 in)**	**290 cm (110 in)**	**(Poland) Grot Budowlani Łódź**
**19**	**Petra Kojdová**	**23 September 1993**	**OS**	**1.83 m (6 ft 0 in)**	**68 kg (150 lb)**	**304 cm (120 in)**	**298 cm (117 in)**	**(Czech Republic) TJ Ostrava**
**20**	**Marie Toufarová**	**19 June 1992**	**OP**	**1.84 m (6 ft 0 in)**	**70 kg (150 lb)**	**304 cm (120 in)**	**294 cm (116 in)**	**(Czech Republic) TJ Ostrava**
21	Lucie Nová	3 May 1996	OS	1.85 m (6 ft 1 in)	70 kg (150 lb)	307 cm (121 in)	292 cm (115 in)	(Czech Republic) Agel Prostějov
22	Veronika Trnková	13 October 1995	MB	1.88 m (6 ft 2 in)	88 kg (194 lb)	314 cm (124 in)	300 cm (120 in)	(Czech Republic) Agel Prostějov

* For players positions, see 'Key' section.

=== Netherlands ===
The following is the Dutch roster in the 2017 Women's European Volleyball Championship. Only the players in bold took part in the final tournament (see 'Overview' section).

Head coach: (United States) Jamie Morrison

No.	Name	Date of birth	Pos*	Height	Weight	Spike	Block	2016–2017 club
**1**	**Kirsten Knip**	**14 September 1992**	**LB**	**1.76 m (5 ft 9 in)**	**73 kg (161 lb)**	**281 cm (111 in)**	**275 cm (108 in)**	**(Germany) Ladies in Black Aachen**
**2**	**Femke Stoltenborg**	**30 July 1991**	**ST**	**1.90 m (6 ft 3 in)**	**81 kg (179 lb)**	**303 cm (119 in)**	**299 cm (118 in)**	**(Germany) Ladies in Black Aachen**
**3**	**Yvon Beliën**	**28 December 1993**	**MB**	**1.88 m (6 ft 2 in)**	**73 kg (161 lb)**	**307 cm (121 in)**	**303 cm (119 in)**	**(Italy) Liu Jo Nordmeccanica Modena**
**4**	**Celeste Plak**	**26 October 1995**	**OP**	**1.90 m (6 ft 3 in)**	**84 kg (185 lb)**	**314 cm (124 in)**	**302 cm (119 in)**	**(Italy) Igor Gorgonzola Novara**
**5**	**Robin de Kruijf**	**5 May 1991**	**MB**	**1.93 m (6 ft 4 in)**	**79 kg (174 lb)**	**313 cm (123 in)**	**300 cm (120 in)**	**(Italy) Imoco Volley Conegliano**
**6**	**Maret Balkestein-Grothues (C)**	**16 September 1988**	**OS**	**1.80 m (5 ft 11 in)**	**68 kg (150 lb)**	**304 cm (120 in)**	**285 cm (112 in)**	**(Turkey) Fenerbahçe Istanbul**
8	Judith Pietersen	3 July 1989	OS	1.88 m (6 ft 2 in)	73 kg (161 lb)	306 cm (120 in)	296 cm (117 in)	(Italy) Igor Gorgonzola Novara
**9**	**Myrthe Schoot**	**29 August 1988**	**LB**	**1.84 m (6 ft 0 in)**	**69 kg (152 lb)**	**298 cm (117 in)**	**286 cm (113 in)**	**(Germany) Dresdner SC**
**10**	**Lonneke Slöetjes**	**15 November 1990**	**OP**	**1.92 m (6 ft 4 in)**	**76 kg (168 lb)**	**322 cm (127 in)**	**315 cm (124 in)**	**(Turkey) Vakıfbank Istanbul**
**11**	**Anne Buijs**	**2 December 1991**	**OS**	**1.91 m (6 ft 3 in)**	**75 kg (165 lb)**	**317 cm (125 in)**	**299 cm (118 in)**	**(Brazil) Rexona-Sesc**
12	Britt Bongaerts	3 November 1996	ST	1.85 m (6 ft 1 in)	68 kg (150 lb)	296 cm (117 in)	284 cm (112 in)	(Germany) USC Münster
13	Sarah van Aalen	21 January 2000	ST	1.83 m (6 ft 0 in)	68 kg (150 lb)	300 cm (120 in)	293 cm (115 in)	(Netherlands) TT Papendal-Arnhem
**14**	**Laura Dijkema**	**18 February 1990**	**ST**	**1.84 m (6 ft 0 in)**	**70 kg (150 lb)**	**297 cm (117 in)**	**278 cm (109 in)**	**(Italy) Igor Gorgonzola Novara**
16	Debby Stam-Pilon	24 July 1984	LB	1.84 m (6 ft 0 in)	68 kg (150 lb)	303 cm (119 in)	281 cm (111 in)	unattached
17	Nicole Oude Luttikhuis	26 December 1997	OS	1.91 m (6 ft 3 in)	74 kg (163 lb)	309 cm (122 in)	299 cm (118 in)	(Germany) Ladies in Black Aachen
**18**	**Marrit Jasper**	**28 February 1996**	**OS**	**1.80 m (5 ft 11 in)**	**75 kg (165 lb)**	**300 cm (120 in)**	**285 cm (112 in)**	**(Germany) VfB Suhl**
**19**	**Nika Daalderop**	**29 November 1998**	**OS**	**1.90 m (6 ft 3 in)**	**72 kg (159 lb)**	**309 cm (122 in)**	**292 cm (115 in)**	**(Germany) Ladies in Black Aachen**
**20**	**Tessa Polder**	**10 October 1997**	**MB**	**1.89 m (6 ft 2 in)**	**76 kg (168 lb)**	**301 cm (119 in)**	**293 cm (115 in)**	**(Germany) Ladies in Black Aachen**
21	Laura de Zwart	19 March 1999	MB	1.98 m (6 ft 6 in)	84 kg (185 lb)	325 cm (128 in)	314 cm (124 in)	(Netherlands) TT Papendal-Arnhem
**22**	**Nicole Koolhaas**	**31 January 1991**	**MB**	**1.98 m (6 ft 6 in)**	**77 kg (170 lb)**	**310 cm (120 in)**	**300 cm (120 in)**	**(Romania) CSM București**
23	Marlies Wagendorp	10 November 1993	MB	1.93 m (6 ft 4 in)	90 kg (200 lb)	312 cm (123 in)	308 cm (121 in)	(Germany) Rote Raben Vilsbiburg
26	Dagmar Boom	1 May 2000	LB	1.81 m (5 ft 11 in)	67 kg (148 lb)	298 cm (117 in)	294 cm (116 in)	(Netherlands) TT Papendal-Arnhem

* For players positions, see 'Key' section.

=== Serbia ===
The following is the Serbian roster in the 2017 Women's European Volleyball Championship. Only the players in bold took part in the final tournament (see 'Overview' section).

Head coach: Zoran Terzić

No.	Name	Date of birth	Pos*	Height	Weight	Spike	Block	2016–2017 club
**1**	**Bianka Buša**	**25 July 1994**	**OS**	**1.87 m (6 ft 2 in)**	**74 kg (163 lb)**	**293 cm (115 in)**	**282 cm (111 in)**	**(Italy) Metalleghe Montichiari**
2	Katarina Lazović	12 September 1999	OS	1.82 m (6 ft 0 in)	65 kg (143 lb)	285 cm (112 in)	275 cm (108 in)	(Serbia) Vizura Belgrade
3	Sanja Malagurski	8 June 1990	OP	1.93 m (6 ft 4 in)	74 kg (163 lb)	305 cm (120 in)	295 cm (116 in)	(Italy) Metalleghe Montichiari
**4**	**Bojana Živković**	**29 March 1988**	**ST**	**1.86 m (6 ft 1 in)**	**72 kg (159 lb)**	**300 cm (120 in)**	**292 cm (115 in)**	**(Switzerland) Voléro Zürich**
**5**	**Mina Popović**	**16 September 1994**	**MB**	**1.87 m (6 ft 2 in)**	**73 kg (161 lb)**	**315 cm (124 in)**	**305 cm (120 in)**	**(Italy) Foppapedretti Bergamo**
**6**	**Tijana Malešević**	**18 March 1991**	**OS**	**1.85 m (6 ft 1 in)**	**78 kg (172 lb)**	**300 cm (120 in)**	**286 cm (113 in)**	**(Brazil) Vôlei Nestlé Osasco**
7	Ana Antonijević	26 August 1987	ST	1.85 m (6 ft 1 in)	71 kg (157 lb)	282 cm (111 in)	269 cm (106 in)	(Romania) CS Volei Alba-Blaj
8	Danica Radenković	9 October 1992	ST	1.85 m (6 ft 1 in)	70 kg (150 lb)	300 cm (120 in)	294 cm (116 in)	(Azerbaijan) Azerrail Baku
**9**	**Brankica Mihajlović**	**13 April 1991**	**OS**	**1.90 m (6 ft 3 in)**	**83 kg (183 lb)**	**302 cm (119 in)**	**290 cm (110 in)**	**(China) Bohai Bank Tianjin**
**10**	**Slađana Mirković**	**7 October 1995**	**ST**	**1.85 m (6 ft 1 in)**	**78 kg (172 lb)**	**293 cm (115 in)**	**282 cm (111 in)**	**(Azerbaijan) Telekom Baku**
**11**	**Stefana Veljković**	**9 January 1990**	**MB**	**1.90 m (6 ft 3 in)**	**76 kg (168 lb)**	**320 cm (130 in)**	**305 cm (120 in)**	**(Poland) Chemik Police**
**12**	**Teodora Pušić**	**12 March 1993**	**LB**	**1.70 m (5 ft 7 in)**	**58 kg (128 lb)**	**270 cm (110 in)**	**260 cm (100 in)**	**(Serbia) Vizura Belgrade**
**13**	**Ana Bjelica**	**3 April 1992**	**OP**	**1.90 m (6 ft 3 in)**	**78 kg (172 lb)**	**310 cm (120 in)**	**305 cm (120 in)**	**(Brazil) Vôlei Nestlé Osasco**
14	Jovana Kocić	24 February 1998	MB	1.90 m (6 ft 3 in)	85 kg (187 lb)	290 cm (110 in)	285 cm (112 in)	(Serbia) Vizura Belgrade
**15**	**Jovana Stevanović**	**30 June 1992**	**MB**	**1.92 m (6 ft 4 in)**	**72 kg (159 lb)**	**308 cm (121 in)**	**295 cm (116 in)**	**(Italy) Pomì Casalmaggiore**
**16**	**Milena Rašić (C)**	**25 October 1990**	**MB**	**1.91 m (6 ft 3 in)**	**72 kg (159 lb)**	**315 cm (124 in)**	**310 cm (120 in)**	**(Turkey) Vakıfbank Istanbul**
17	Silvija Popović	15 March 1986	LB	1.78 m (5 ft 10 in)	65 kg (143 lb)	286 cm (113 in)	276 cm (109 in)	(Switzerland) Voléro Zürich
**18**	**Tijana Bošković**	**8 March 1997**	**OP**	**1.93 m (6 ft 4 in)**	**82 kg (181 lb)**	**310 cm (120 in)**	**300 cm (120 in)**	**(Turkey) Eczacıbaşı VitrA Istanbul**
**19**	**Bojana Milenković**	**6 March 1997**	**OS**	**1.85 m (6 ft 1 in)**	**70 kg (150 lb)**	**294 cm (116 in)**	**288 cm (113 in)**	**(Serbia) Red Star Belgrade**
**20**	**Jelena Blagojević**	**1 December 1988**	**LB**	**1.81 m (5 ft 11 in)**	**68 kg (150 lb)**	**267 cm (105 in)**	**242 cm (95 in)**	**(Poland) Chemik Police**
21	Ana Lazarević	4 July 1991	OS	1.86 m (6 ft 1 in)	74 kg (163 lb)	280 cm (110 in)	268 cm (106 in)	(Greece) Olympiacos Piraeus
22	Sara Lozo	29 April 1997	OS	1.86 m (6 ft 1 in)	61 kg (134 lb)	295 cm (116 in)	290 cm (110 in)	(Serbia) Vizura Belgrade

* For players positions, see 'Key' section.

== See also ==
- 2017 Men's European Volleyball Championship squads
