= 2022 FIVB Women's Volleyball Challenger Cup squads =

This article shows the rosters of all the participating teams at the 2022 FIVB Women's Volleyball Challenger Cup in Zadar.

== Rosters ==
=== Belgium ===
The following is the Belgian roster in the 2022 Women's Volleyball Challenger Cup.

- Head coach: Gert Vande Broek

No.	Name	Date of birth	Height	Position	2021–22 club
2	Elise Van Sas	1 December 1997 (aged 24)	1.88 m (6 ft 2 in)	Setter	(Belgium) VC Oudegem
3	Britt Herbots	24 September 1999 (aged 22)	1.88 m (6 ft 2 in)	Outside spiker	(Italy) AGIL Volley
4	Nathalie Lemmens	12 March 1995 (aged 27)	1.92 m (6 ft 4 in)	Middle blocker	(Hungary) 1. MCM-Diamant Kaposvár
5	Jodie Guilliams	26 April 1997 (aged 25)	1.80 m (5 ft 11 in)	Outside spiker	(Germany) Rote Raben Vilsbiburg
7	Celine Van Gestel	7 November 1997 (aged 24)	1.82 m (6 ft 0 in)	Outside spiker	(Italy) Azzurra Volley San Casciano
9	Nel Demeyer	21 March 2001 (aged 21)	1.75 m (5 ft 9 in)	Libero	(Belgium) VC Oudegem
10	Pauline Martin	9 April 2002 (aged 20)	1.85 m (6 ft 1 in)	Opposite hitter	(Belgium) Dauphines Charleroi
12	Charlotte Krenicky	29 June 2000 (aged 22)	1.86 m (6 ft 1 in)	Setter	(Belgium) Jaraco LVL Genk
13	Marlies Janssens	4 June 1997 (aged 25)	1.93 m (6 ft 4 in)	Middle blocker	(Belgium) VDK Bank Gent
15	Jutta Van de Vyver	11 June 1996 (aged 26)	1.75 m (5 ft 9 in)	Setter	(Belgium) Asterix Kieldrecht
18	Britt Rampelberg	5 June 2000 (aged 22)	1.65 m (5 ft 5 in)	Libero	(Belgium) Asterix Kieldrecht
19	Silke Van Avermaet	2 June 1999 (aged 23)	1.92 m (6 ft 4 in)	Middle blocker	(France) ASPTT Mulhouse
21	Manon Stragier	12 March 1999 (aged 23)	1.82 m (6 ft 0 in)	Opposite hitter	(Belgium) Asterix Kieldrecht
22	Anna Koulberg	17 August 2004 (aged 17)	1.87 m (6 ft 2 in)	Middle blocker	(Belgium) Asterix Kieldrecht

=== Croatia ===
The following is the Belgian roster in the 2022 Women's Volleyball Challenger Cup.

- Head coach: Ferhat Akbaş

No.	Name	Date of birth	Height	Position	2021–22 club
2	Mika Grbavica	8 December 2001 (aged 20)	1.91 m (6 ft 3 in)	Opposite hitter	(Croatia) HAOK Mladost
3	Ema Strunjak	24 September 1999 (aged 22)	1.88 m (6 ft 2 in)	Middle blocker	(Hungary) Békéscsabai RSE
4	Božana Butigan	19 August 2000 (aged 21)	1.92 m (6 ft 4 in)	Middle blocker	(Italy) Volley Bergamo
6	Klara Perić	30 March 1998 (aged 24)	1.85 m (6 ft 1 in)	Setter	(Croatia) HAOK Mladost
7	Laura Miloš	20 October 1994 (aged 27)	1.78 m (5 ft 10 in)	Outside spiker	(France) Saint-Raphael Var Volley-Ball
9	Lucija Mlinar	6 May 1995 (aged 27)	1.80 m (5 ft 11 in)	Outside spiker	(Turkey) Çukurova Belediyespor
10	Dijana Karatović	23 July 2003 (aged 19)	1.75 m (5 ft 9 in)	Outside spiker	(Croatia) OK Kaštela
11	Beta Dumančić	26 March 1991 (aged 31)	1.90 m (6 ft 3 in)	Middle blocker	(Germany) Rote Raben Vilsbiburg
12	Josipa Marković	25 January 2001 (aged 21)	1.85 m (6 ft 1 in)	Outside spiker	(Croatia) HAOK Mladost
13	Samanta Fabris	8 February 1992 (aged 30)	1.90 m (6 ft 3 in)	Opposite hitter	(Russia) WVC Dynamo Kazan
14	Martina Šamadan	11 September 1993 (aged 28)	1.93 m (6 ft 4 in)	Middle blocker	(Croatia) HAOK Mladost
16	Lea Deak	27 April 2000 (aged 22)	1.77 m (5 ft 10 in)	Setter	(Switzerland) Volero Zürich
19	Izabela Štimac	12 November 2000 (aged 21)	1.71 m (5 ft 7 in)	Libero	(Croatia) HAOK Mladost
20	Natalia Tomić	4 January 2002 (aged 20)	1.88 m (6 ft 2 in)	Outside spiker	(Croatia) HAOK Mladost
