= Caroline Laforge =

Belgian volleyball player (born 1991)

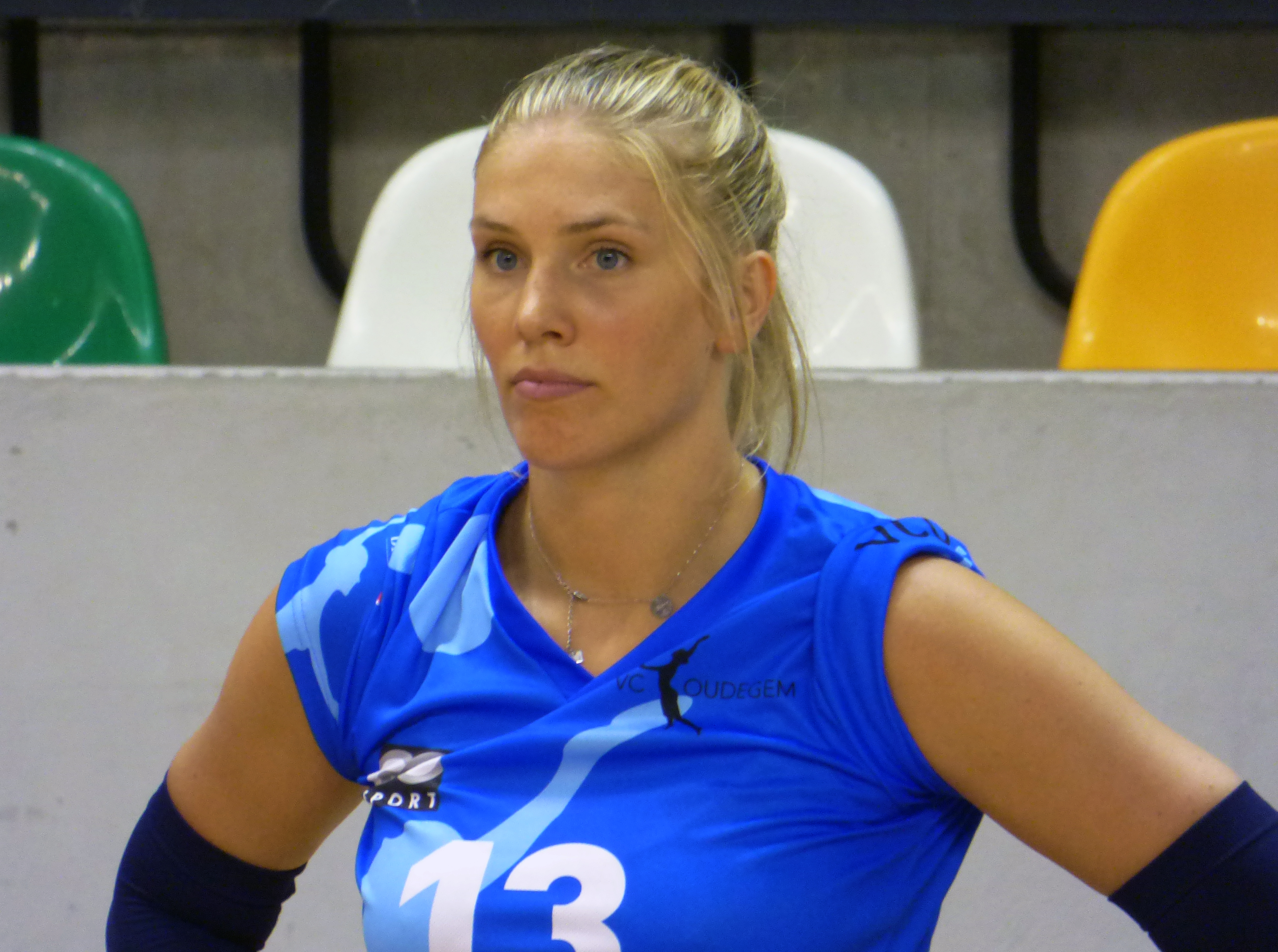

Personal information
- Born: 28 April 1991 (age 35)
- Height: 1.74 m (5 ft 9 in)
- Weight: 70 kg (150 lb)
- Spike: 280 cm (110 in)
- Block: 265 cm (104 in)

Volleyball information
- Position: Outside hitter

Career
Years	Teams
2005–2010; 2012–2016; 2016–2018; 2018–2019	ASVC Chapelle; Dauphines Charleroi; VC Oudegem; VC Lessines

National team
Belgium

Caroline Laforge (born 28 April 1991) is a retired Belgian volleyball player. She last played as outside hitter for Belgian club VC Lessines. Caroline is the sister of former Belgium women's national volleyball team member and Dauphines Charleroi setter Celine Laforge.
