= VDK Gent Dames =

Belgian volleyball club

- Ground: Bourgoyen; Mariakerke; Belgium
- Chairman: (Belgium) Notte Kurt
- League: Liga A
- 2016–17: 6th
- Website: Club home page

Uniforms
Home	Away

VDK Gent Damesvolleybalteam is a volleyball team from Ghent, Belgium.

VDK Gent-Heusden was founded in 1990, after a merger between VDK Wondelgem, Nova Smash Sint-Amandsberg and VBK Heusden. The new club had men's and women's teams. In 1993, White Star Sint-Amandsberg and VOM Gentbrugge joined, and the name of the club was shortened to VDK Gent. The activities of Gent were split up in 1997. The women's teams became active under VDK Gent Damesvolleybalteam, the men's compartiment was named VDK Gent Herenvolleyteam.

The women's A squad currently plays in Liga A. They achieved promotion to the highest level for the first time in their history in 1995. It has won the Liga A, the Belgium Cup and the Supercup.

The team has also played several times in European competitions such as the Challenge Cup, CEV Cup and the CEV Champions League.

== Honours ==
=== National competitions ===
- Belgian Championship: 1

2012–13

- Belgian Cup: 1

2008–09

- Belgian Supercup: 4

2009, 2011, 2013, 2015

== Squad ==
Season 2016–2017, as of January 2017.

Number	Player	Position	Height (m)	Weight (kg)	Birth date
1	(Belgium) Lisa Neyt	Libero	1.75	69	2 September 1993 (age 32)
2	(Belgium) Paulien Neyt	Opposite	1.83	70	22 November 1990 (age 35)
3	(Belgium) Yente Ghillebert	Libero	1.65	50	13 March 2000 (age 26)
4	(Belgium) Hanne De Schrijver	Setter	1.76	71	27 August 1996 (age 29)
5	(Belgium) Lise De Valkeneer	Outside hitter	1.77	76	16 January 1990 (age 36)
6	(Belgium) Kaat De Boeck	Opposite	1.87	68	24 June 1998 (age 27)
7	(Curaçao) Christine Anthony	Outside hitter	1.72	66	14 February 1991 (age 35)
8	(Belgium) Laure Flament	Outside hitter	1.82	76	18 June 1998 (age 27)
9	(Belgium) Lotte De Quick	Setter	1.72	53	11 January 1998 (age 28)
10	(Belgium) Céline Jacquemyn	Middle blocker	1.85	69	21 November 1997 (age 28)
11	(Belgium) Iris Vandewiele	Middle blocker	1.89	71	7 March 1994 (age 32)
12	(Belgium) Gwendoline Horemans	Middle blocker	1.88	68	16 September 1987 (age 38)
Coach: (Belgium) Nico De Clercq

2013–2014 Team
#	Nationality	Name
1	Belgium	Karolina Goliat
2	Belgium	Aziliz Divoux
3	Belgium	Renée Verhulst
4	Belgium	Laura De Schrijver
5	Belgium	Lise De Valkeneer
6	Belgium	Maud Catry
7	Belgium	Marlies De Smet
8	Belgium	Adeline Lemey
9	Belgium	Karolien Verstrepen
10	Belgium	Lize Van Cleemputte
11	Belgium	Birthe Wittock
13	Belgium	Brenda Taga
Coach: (Belgium) Stijn Morand

2012–2013 Team
#	Nationality	Name
1	Belgium	Lisa Neyt
2	Belgium	Aziliz Divoux
3	Belgium	Delfien Brugman
4	Belgium	Birthe Wittock
5	Belgium	Lise De Valkeneer
6	Belgium	Maud Catry
7	Belgium	Marlies De Smet
8	Netherlands	Flore Gravesteijn
9	Belgium	Elies Goos
10	Belgium	Bieke Huyst
12	Belgium	Gwendoline Horemans
13	Croatia	Isabel Kovacic
Coach: (Belgium) Stijn Morand

2011–2012 Team
#	Nationality	Name
1	Belgium	Lisa Neyt
2	Belgium	Arianne Horemans
3	Belgium	Els Vandesteene
4	Belgium	Valerie Courtois
5	Belgium	Lise De Valkeneer
6	Belgium	Maud Catry
7	Belgium	Marlies De Smet
8	Belgium	Adeline Lemey
9	Belgium	Elies Goos
10	Belgium	Laura De Schrijver
12	Belgium	Gwendoline Horemans
13	Belgium	Lore Gillis
Coach: (Belgium) Stijn Morand

2010–2011 Team
#	Nationality	Name
1	Belgium	Lisa Neyt
2	Belgium	Jasmien Biebauw
3	Belgium	Els Vandesteene
4	Belgium	Valerie Courtois
5	Belgium	Lise De Valkeneer
6	Belgium	Maud Catry
7	Belgium	Marlies De Smet
8	Belgium	Adeline Lemey
9	Belgium	Elies Goos
10	Belgium	Laura De Schrijver
13	Belgium	Lore Gillis
14	Belgium	Elien Ruysschaert
Coach: (Belgium) Stijn Morand

2009–2010 Team
#	Nationality	Name
1	Belgium	Valerie Courtois
2	Belgium	Jasmien Biebauw
3	Belgium	Els Vandesteene
4	Belgium	Paulien Neyt
5	Belgium	Lise De Valkeneer
6	Belgium	Maud Catry
7	Belgium	Karolien Verstrepen
8	Belgium	Adeline Lemey
9	Belgium	Elies Goos
10	Belgium	Laura De Schrijver
11	Belgium	Dauphine Vanderschelden
12	Belgium	Amber Van Haecke
13	Belgium	Lore Gillis
14	Belgium	Marlies De Smet
Coach: (Belgium) Stijn Morand
