= Aziliz Divoux =

Belgian volleyball player (born 1995)

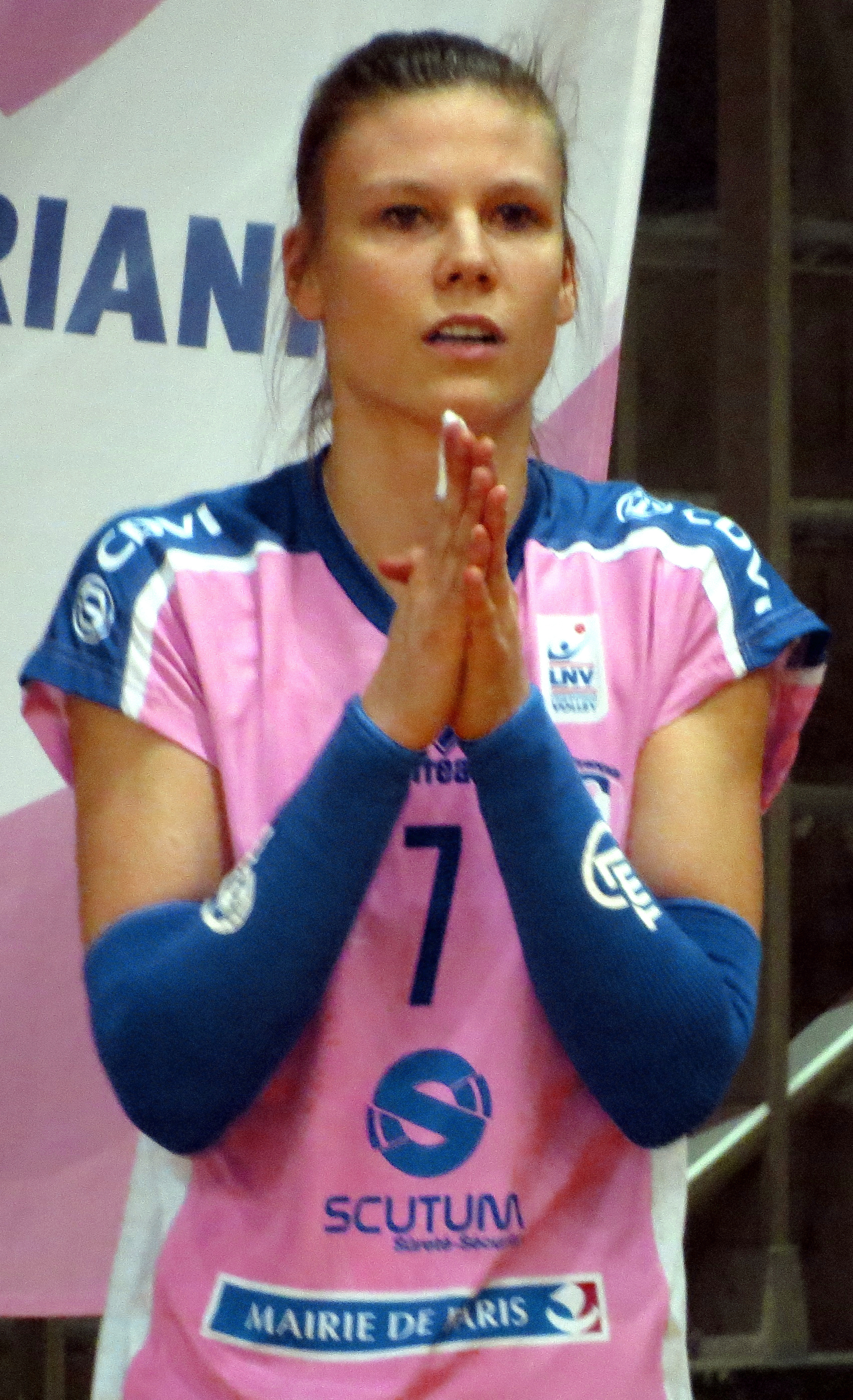

Personal information
- Nationality: Belgium / France
- Born: 3 January 1995 (age 31); Uccle, Belgium
- Hometown: Affligem
- Height: 183 cm (6 ft 0 in)
- Weight: 61 kg (134 lb)
- Spike: 298 cm (117 in)
- Block: 294 cm (116 in)

Volleyball information
- Position: Setter
- Current club: VDK Gent Dames
- Number: 24 (national team)

Career
Years	Teams
2015	VDK Gent Dames
2015-2017	Stade Français - Paris Saint Cloud
2017-2018	ASPTT Mulhouse
2018-2020	Ladies in Black Aachen
2020-2022	VC Marcq-en-Barœul
2022-present	VDK Gent Dames

National team
2015	Belgium

Aziliz Divoux (born 3 January 1995) is a Belgian-French female volleyball player. She was part of the Belgium women's national volleyball team.

She participated in the 2015 FIVB Volleyball World Grand Prix, and in the 2016 FIVB Volleyball World Grand Prix. On club level she played for VDK Gent Dames in 2015.
