= Karolina Goliat =

Belgian volleyball player

Personal information
- Nationality: Belgium
- Born: 25 October 1996 (age 30); Sint-Niklaas
- Height: 1.90 m (6 ft 3 in)
- Weight: 79 kg (174 lb)
- Spike: 308 cm (121 in)
- Block: 295 cm (116 in)

Career
Years	Teams
2015	Saint-Raphael

Karolina Goliat (born 25 October 1996) is a Belgian female volleyball player. She is a member of the Belgium women's national volleyball team.

She was part of the Belgian national team at the 2015 FIVB World Grand Prix,

She is of Polish descent. Her father Wiesław Goliat was a Polish national handball team player, her mother Jadwiga Wojciechowska was a Polish national volleyball team player.

== Clubs ==
Club	From	To
Belgium Asterix Kieldrecht	2010-2011	2011-2012
Belgium Topsportschool Volleybal	2012-2013	2012-2013
Belgium VDK Gent Dames	2013-2014	2014-2015
Italy Volley Towers	2015-2016	2015-2016
Poland Atom Trefl Sopot	2016-2017	2016-2017
France AS Saint-Raphaël	2017-2018	…
