= Els Vandesteene =

Belgian volleyball player

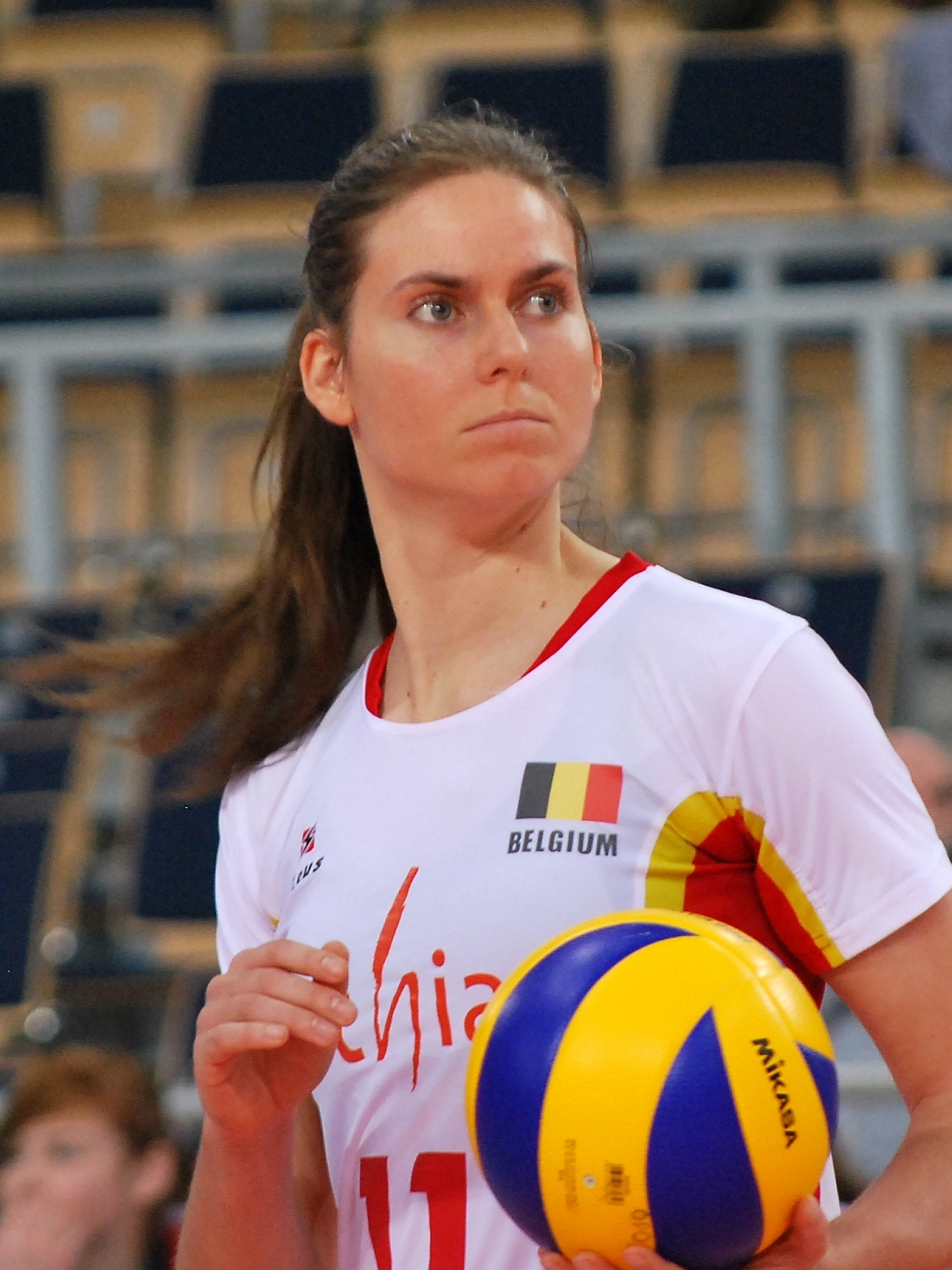

Personal information
- Nationality: Belgium
- Born: 30 May 1987 (age 39)
- Height: 1.84 m (6 ft 0 in)
- Weight: 70 kg (154 lb)
- Spike: 308 cm (121 in)
- Block: 291 cm (115 in)

Volleyball information
- Number: 11

Career
Years	Teams
2015	(France) Volley-Ball Nantes
Honours
Women's volleyball
Representing Belgium
European Championships
Bronze medal – third place	2013 Germany	Team

Els Vandesteene (born 30 May 1987) is a Belgian female volleyball player. She is a member of the Belgium women's national volleyball team and played for Volley-Ball Nantes in 2014. She was part of the Belgian national team at the 2014 FIVB Volleyball Women's World Championship in Italy.

== Clubs ==
- (Belgium) VDK Gent Dames (2002–2012)
- (Germany) VT Aurubis Hamburg (2012–2013)
- (France) Volley-Ball Nantes (2013–2016)
