= Oriane Moulin =

Belgian volleyball player (born 2000)

Personal information
- Nickname: Lizzy
- Nationality: Belgian
- Born: 18 February 2000 (age 26)
- Hometown: Bellem
- Height: 181 cm (71 in)
- Weight: 63 kg (139 lb)
- Spike: 303 cm (119 in)
- Block: 387 cm (152 in)

Volleyball information
- Position: Libero
- Current club: Tchalou Volley
- Number: 18 (national team and club team)

National team
2018	Belgium

Oriane Moulin (born 18 February 2000) is a Belgian female volleyball player. She is part of the Belgium women's national volleyball team.

She participated in the 2018 FIVB Volleyball Women's Nations League. On club level she played for Tchalou Volley.
