= Celine Laforge =

Belgian volleyball player (born 1985)

Personal information
- Nationality: Belgian
- Born: 13 May 1985 (age 41)

Volleyball information
- Position: setter
- Number: 13 (national team)

National team
2007	Belgium

Celine Laforge (born 13 May 1985) is a Belgian female former volleyball player, playing as a setter. She was part of the Belgium women's national volleyball team.

She competed at the 2011 Women's European Volleyball Championship.
