= Valérie Courtois =

Belgian volleyball player (born 1990)

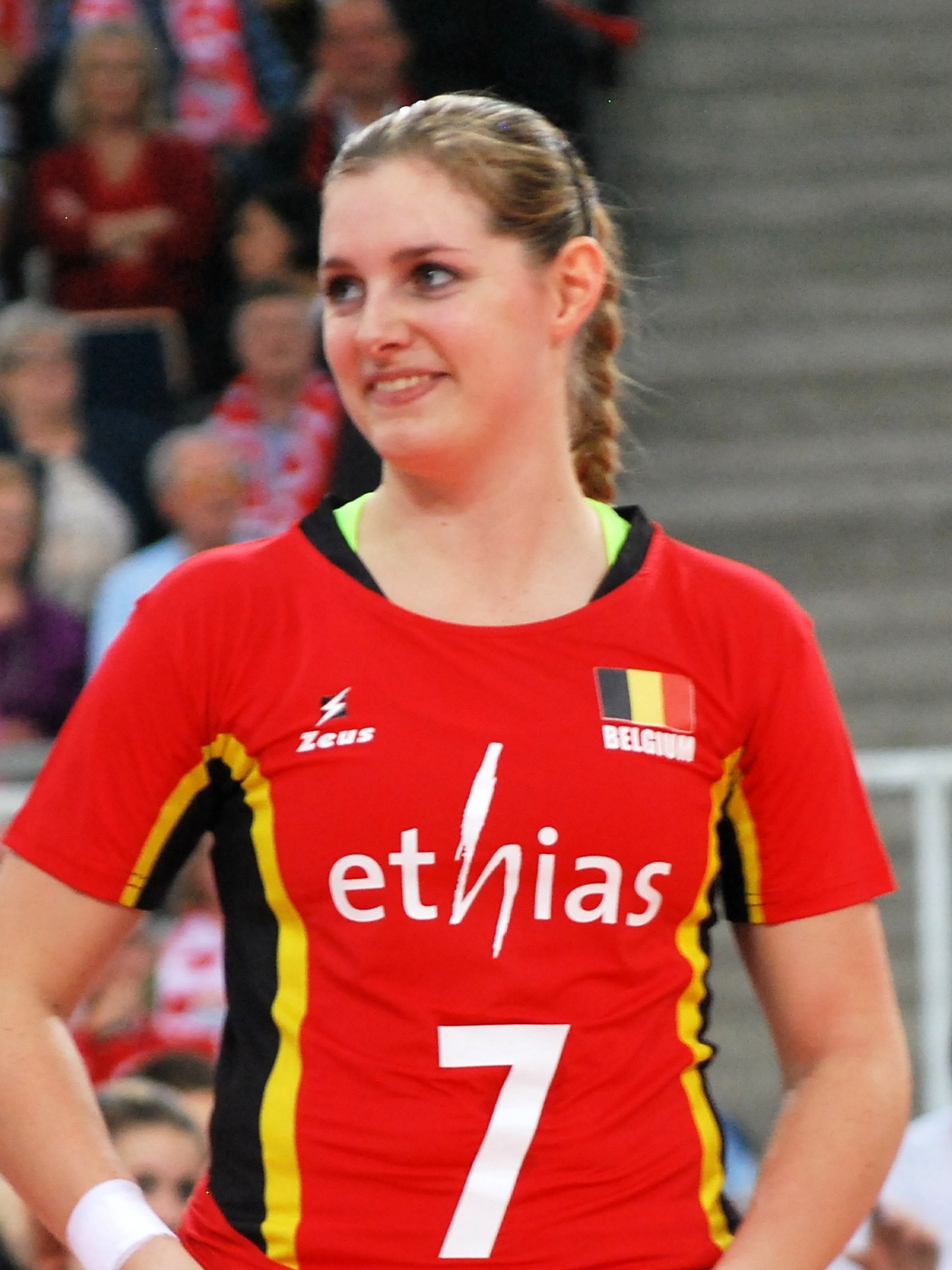
- Courtois playing for Belgium in 2014

Personal information
- Born: 1 November 1990 (age 35) Bilzen, Belgium
- Height: 1.71 m (5 ft 7 1/2 in)
- Weight: 67 kg (148 lb)
- Spike: 280 cm (110 in)
- Block: 270 cm (110 in)

Volleyball information
- Position: Libero
- Current club: Stade Français Paris Saint Cloud
- Number: 4

Career
- Years: Team
- 2008–2012 2012–2013 2014–2015 2015–2017 2017–2019: VDK Gent Dames; VC Oudegem; Budowlani Łódź; Dresdner SC; Stade Français Paris Saint Cloud
Honours
Women's volleyball
Representing Belgium
European Championships
Bronze medal – third place	2013 Germany	Team
Women's European Volleyball League
Silver medal – second place	2013 Bulgaria	Team

Valérie Courtois (French pronunciation: [valeʁi kuʁtwa]; born 1 November 1990) is a Belgian volleyball player who played as a libero for Stade Français Paris Saint Cloud.

In 2013, she was named Best Libero of the European Championships.

Her brother, Thibaut is a professional football player.

== Clubs ==
- (Belgium) VDK Gent Dames (2008–2012)
- (Belgium) VC Oudegem (2012–2013)
- (Poland) Budowlani Łódź (2014–2015)
- (Germany) Dresdner SC (2015–2017)
- (France) Stade Français Paris Saint Cloud (2017–2019)
