= Lore Gillis =

Belgian volleyball player (born 1988)

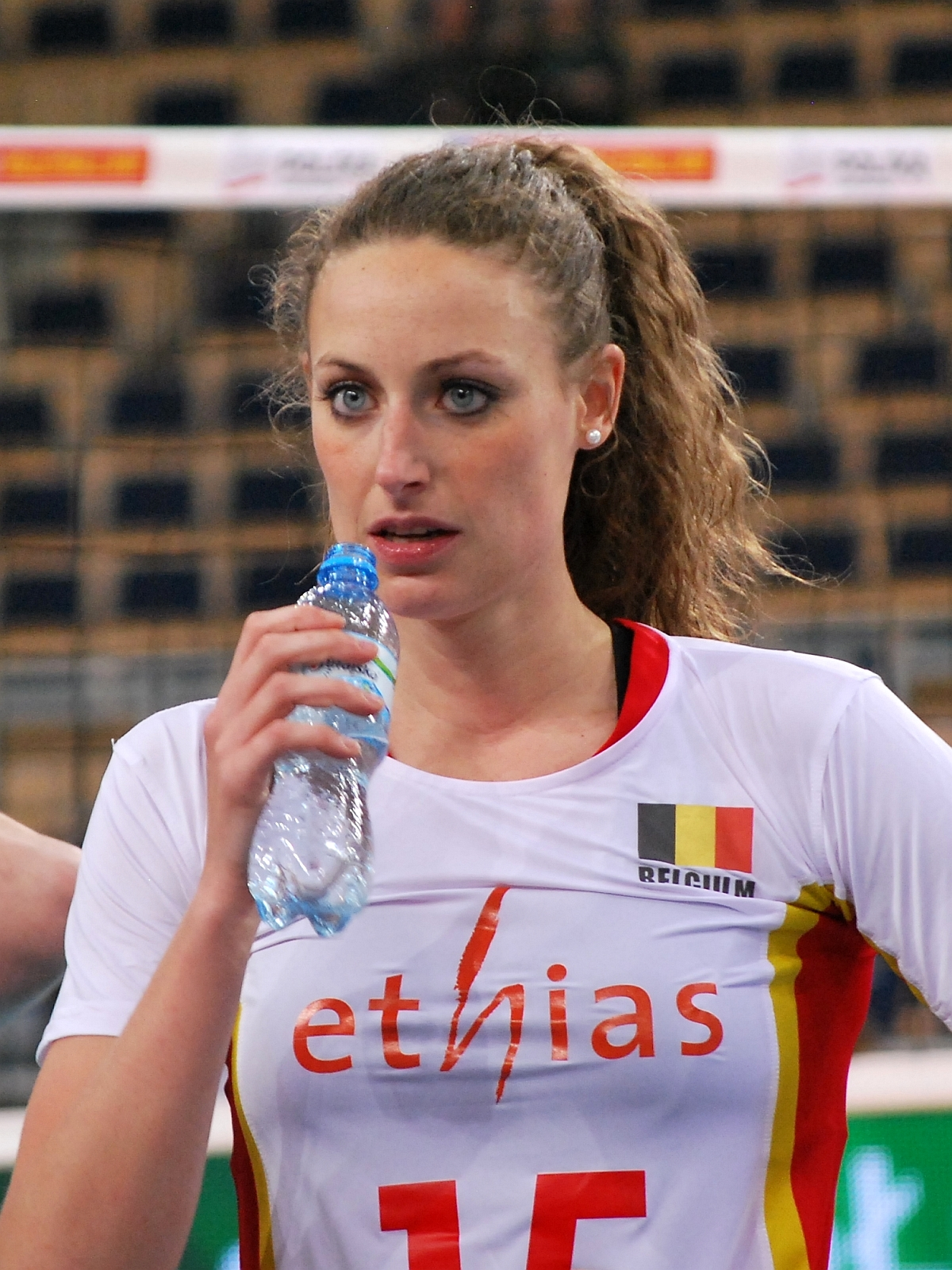

Personal information
- Nationality: Belgian
- Born: 29 November 1988 (age 37)
- Height: 188 cm (74 in)

Volleyball information
- Position: outside hitter
- Number: 19 (national team)

Career
Years	Teams
2013	VC Oudegem

National team
2007-2013	Belgium
Honours
Women's volleyball
Representing (Belgium)
European Championships
Bronze medal – third place	2013 Germany	Team

Lore Gillis (born 29 November 1988) is a Belgian female former volleyball player, playing as an outside hitter. She was part of the Belgium women's national volleyball team.

She competed at the 2007 and 2013 Women's European Volleyball Championship. On club level she played for VC Oudegem.
