= Jasmien Biebauw =

Belgian volleyball player (born 1990)

Personal information
- Nationality: Belgian
- Born: 24 September 1990 (age 36)
- Height: 180 cm (71 in)
- Weight: 81 kg (179 lb)
- Spike: 295 cm (116 in)
- Block: 274 cm (108 in)

Volleyball information
- Position: Setter
- Number: 2 (national team)

Career
Years	Teams
2015	Asterix Kieldrecht

National team
2015	Belgium
Honours
Women's volleyball
Representing Belgium
European Championships
Bronze medal – third place	2013 Germany	Team

Jasmien Biebauw (born 24 September 1990) is a Belgian female volleyball player, playing as a setter. She is part of the Belgium women's national volleyball team.

She competed at the 2015 European Games and 2015 Women's European Volleyball Championship. On club level she plays for Asterix Kieldrecht.
