= Nika Stanović =

Croatian volleyball player (born 1993)

Personal information
- Born: 2 October 1993 (age 33); Dubrovnik, Croatia
- Height: 1.80 m (5 ft 11 in)
- Weight: 65 kg (143 lb)
- Spike: 290 cm (110 in)
- Block: 280 cm (110 in)

Volleyball information
- Position: Outside hitter
- Current club: ŽOK Kaštela
- Number: 2

Career
Years	Teams
2010–	ŽOK Kaštela

National team
Croatia
Honours
Women's volleyball
Representing Croatia
European League
Silver medal – second place	2019 Varaždin

Nika Stanović (born 2 October 1993) is a Croatian volleyball player. She plays as outside hitter for Croatian club ŽOK Kaštela.
