= Manon Stragier =

Belgian volleyball player (born 1999)

Personal information
- Nationality: Belgian
- Born: 12 March 1999 (age 27); Kortrijk, Belgium
- Height: 182 cm (72 in)
- Weight: 69 kg (152 lb)
- Spike: 308 cm (121 in)
- Block: 283 cm (111 in)

Volleyball information
- Current club: Asterix AVO Beveren
- Number: 21 (national team)

National team
2018	Belgium

Manon Stragier (born 12 March 1999) is a Belgian volleyball player. She is part of the Belgium women's national volleyball team.

She competed at the 2018 FIVB Volleyball Women's Nations League. On club level she plays for Asterix Kieldrecht.
