= Jodie Guilliams =

Belgian volleyball player (born 1997)

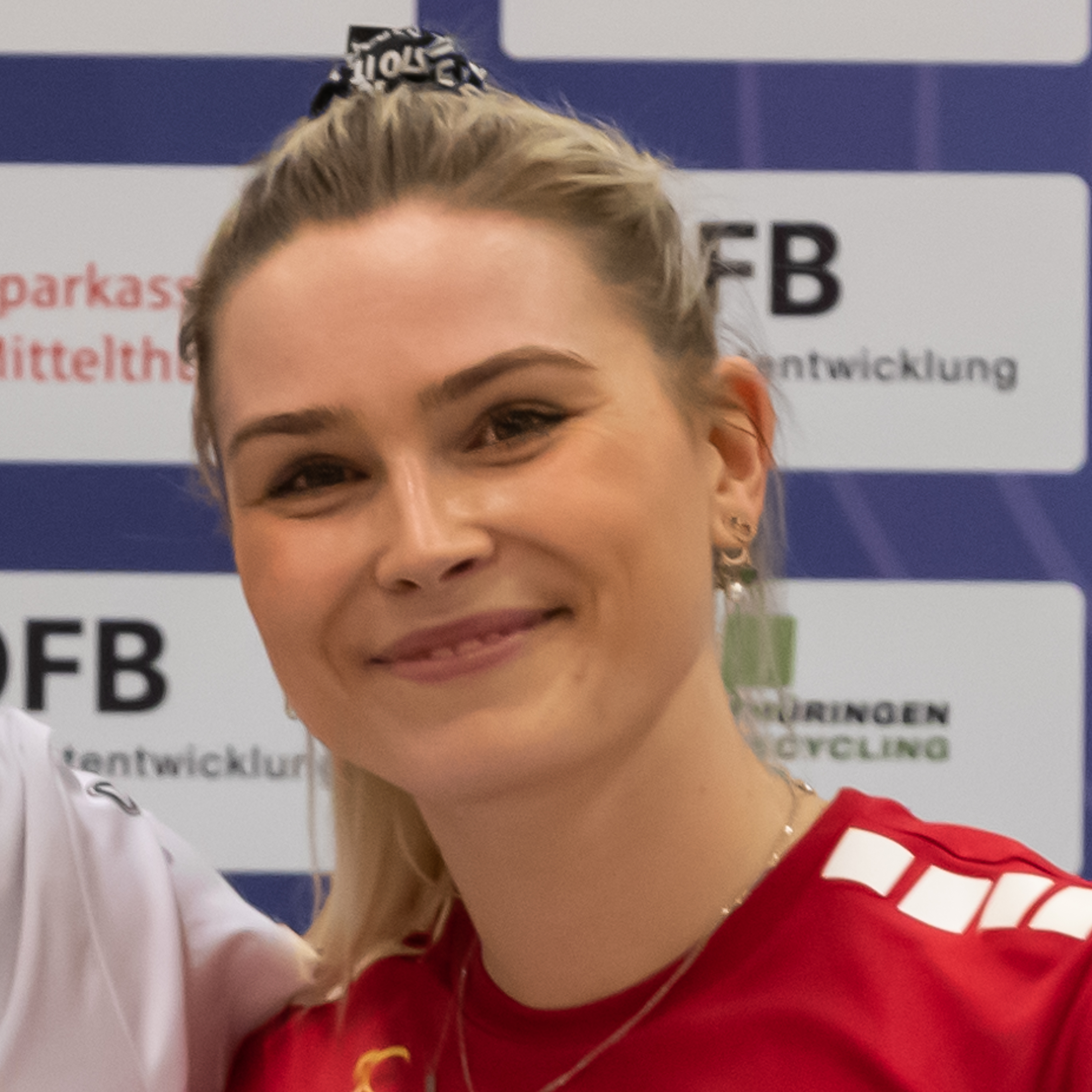

Personal information
- Nationality: Belgian
- Born: 26 April 1997 (age 29)
- Height: 180 cm (71 in)
- Weight: 70 kg (154 lb)
- Spike: 305 cm (120 in)
- Block: 289 cm (114 in)

Volleyball information
- Current club: Rote Raben Vilsbiburg
- Number: 5 / 20 (national team)

Career
Years	Teams
2017	VC Oudegem

National team
2017	Belgium

Jodie Guilliams (born 26 April 1997) is a Belgian volleyball player. She plays as an outside hitter.

== Career ==
In her youth, Jodie Guilliams played from childhood with Landen SV, and from 2010 with the Lizards Lubbeek. She attended the volleyball school program of the Topsportschool in Vilvoorde, where she changed from her usual opposite position to reception corner player. Jodie Guilliams made her debut at VC Oudegem in 2014, played in the CEV Challenge Cup and moved after three seasons and after becoming vice-champion with her team to Asterix Avo Beveren where she won the double title of champion and cup. In 2018, Jodie Guilliams went internationally to Germany when she started at Ladies in Black Aachen where she reached the semifinals in both the DVV-Pokal and the Playoffs of the Bundesliga. Since 2019/20 she has been playing for Rote Raben Vilsbiburg in Germany.

In 2013 Jodie Guilliams played for the national junior team in the European qualifications of the World Cup, trained by Julien Van de Vijver. In 2014 she played with the Young Yellow Tigers at the U19 European Championship. Jodie Guilliams made her debut in the Belgian national team in 2017 during the FIVB Volleyball World Grand Prix and was part of the team at the 2018 FIVB Nations League Women and 2019 FIVB Nations League Women.

== Clubs ==
- 2014 - 2017: (Belgium) VC Oudegem
- 2017 - 2018: (Belgium) Asterix Avo Beveren
- 2018 - 2019: (Germany) Ladies in Black Aachen
- 2019 - 2022: (Germany) Rote Raben Vilsbiburg
- 2022 - 2023: (Germany) Wiesbaden
- 2023 - 2024: (Belgium) VDK Gent
