= Celine Van Gestel =

Belgian volleyball player (born 1997)

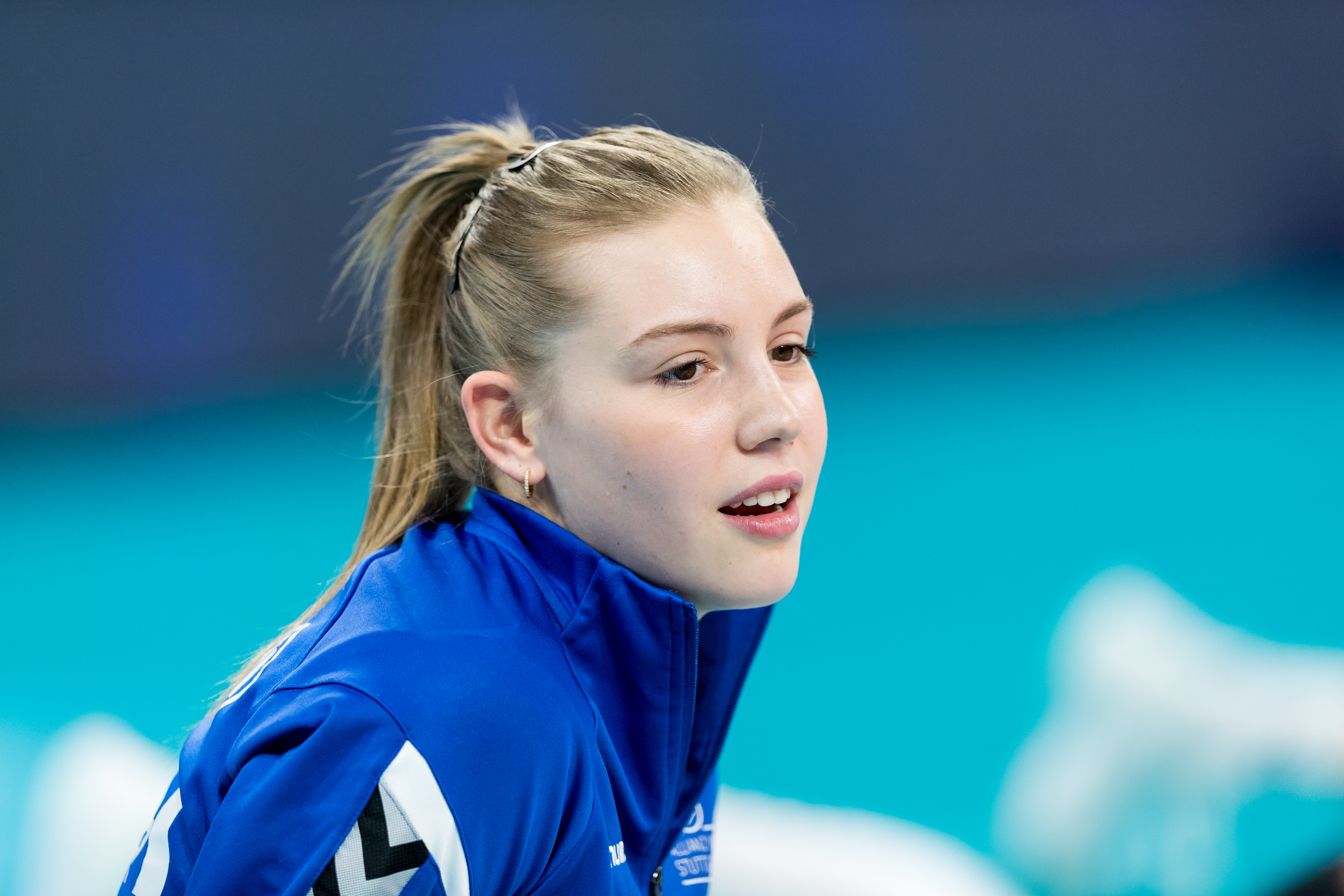
- Van Gestel in 2020

Personal information
- Nationality: Belgian
- Born: 7 November 1997 (age 28)
- Hometown: Dessel
- Height: 183 cm (72 in)
- Weight: 70 kg (154 lb)
- Spike: 310 cm (122 in)
- Block: 280 cm (110 in)

Volleyball information
- Position: Outside-spiker
- Current club: Il Bisonte Firenze - Actually
- Number: 7 (national team)

Career
Years	Teams
2015–2019	Asterix Kieldrecht
2019–2020	Stuttgart
2021-Actually	Il Bisonte Firenze

National team
2015–	Belgium

Celine Van Gestel (born 7 November 1997) is a former Belgian volleyball player, playing as an outside-spiker.

She is part of the Belgium women's national volleyball team. She competed at the 2022 FIVB Volleyball Women's World Championship.

She competed at the 2015 Women's European Volleyball Championship. On club level she played for Asterix Kieldrecht, Allianz MTV Stuttgart, and Il Bisonte Firenze.
