= Lisa Neyt =

Belgian volleyball player (born 1993)

Personal information
- Nickname: Lizzy
- Nationality: Belgian
- Born: 2 September 1993 (age 33); Deinze
- Hometown: Bellem
- Height: 176 cm (69 in)
- Weight: 71 kg (157 lb)
- Spike: 0 cm (0 in)
- Block: 0 cm (0 in)

Volleyball information
- Position: Libero
- Current club: Volley Saturnus Michelbeke
- Number: 1 (national team and club team)

Career
Years	Teams
2014	VC Oudegem

National team
2014	Belgium

Lisa Neyt (Deinze, 2 September 1993) is a Belgian female volleyball player and also a teacher. She is part of the Belgium women's national volleyball team.

She participated in the 2014 FIVB Volleyball World Grand Prix, 2017 FIVB Volleyball World Grand Prix, and 2018 FIVB Volleyball Women's Nations League. On club level she played for VDK Gent. With this club Neyt won the national volleyball title in 2012–2013.
