= VC Oudegem =

Belgian volleyball club

- Ground: Ouburg; Dendermonde; Belgium
- Chairman: (Belgium) Gerdi De Kimpe
- League: Ere Divisie Dames
- 2016–17: 2nd
- Website: Club home page

Uniforms
Home	Away

VC Oudegem is a women's volleyball team based in Oudegem, a town in the municipality of Dendermonde, Belgium. The club was founded in 1978.

Since the 2010–11 season, the women's A squad plays in Ere Divisie, the highest level of the Belgian volleyball league pyramid. Their first Ere Divisie season started in 2008, in which the team did quite well and almost managed to avoid relegation playoffs. The relegation playoff itself went quite disastrous however, and Oudegem were relegated directly. They returned to the highest level immediately, after becoming champions.

VC Oudegem has a B team playing in Eerste Divisie, the third tier of Belgian women's volleyball.

== Honours ==
=== National competitions ===
- Belgian Cup: 1

2012–13

== Team squad ==
Season 2016–2017, as of January 2017.

Number	Player	Position	Height (m)	Weight (kg)	Birth date
2	(Belgium) Elise Van Sas	Setter	1.88	74	1 August 1997 (age 28)
3	(Belgium) Marlies Janssens	Middle blocker	1.93	83	4 June 1997 (age 28)
4	(Belgium) Lana Mees	Outside hitter	1.75	78	26 July 1993 (age 32)
5	(Belgium) Jodie Guilliams	Outside hitter	1.81	72	26 April 1997 (age 29)
6	(Belgium) Jutta Van De Vyver	Setter	1.75	74	11 June 1996 (age 29)
7	(Belgium) Lorena Cianci	Outside hitter	1.74	58	25 May 1994 (age 31)
8	(Belgium) Julie Smeets	Middle blocker	1.86	76	10 April 1997 (age 29)
9	(Belgium) Lore Gillis	Opposite	1.87	70	29 November 1988 (age 37)
10	(Belgium) Alixe Degelin	Outside hitter	1.80	69	29 March 2000 (age 26)
11	(Belgium) Margo Voets	Libero	1.67	68	10 September 1995 (age 30)
12	(Belgium) Linde Hervent	Opposite	1.89	75	8 May 1994 (age 31)
13	(Belgium) Caroline Laforge	Outside hitter	1.73	70	28 April 1991 (age 35)
14	(Belgium) Rebecca Michiels	Outside hitter	1.77	60	25 January 2000 (age 26)
15	(Belgium) Margot Van De Voorde	Middle blocker	1.83	70	15 February 1997 (age 29)
16	(Belgium) Elien Peeters	Middle blocker	1.81	73	26 April 1999 (age 27)
Coach: (Belgium) Sacha Koulberg

2010–2011 Team
#	Nationality	Name
1	Belgium	Annelore Schaut
2	Belgium	Karen Van Renterghem
3	Belgium	Maaike Van Isterdael
4	Belgium	Anke Allemeersch
5	Belgium	Fien Callens
6	Belgium	Griet Depaepe
7	Belgium	Tasha Moens
8	Belgium	Julie Claeys
9	Belgium	Stéphanie Van Bree
11	Belgium	Imke Emmery
12	Belgium	Ans Devreese
13	Belgium	Tinne Verbeyst
Coach: (Belgium) Anja Duyck
