= Belgium women's national volleyball team =

Belgium
- Nickname(s): Yellow Tigers
- Association: Royal Belgian Volleyball Federation
- Confederation: CEV
- Head coach: Gert Van de Broek
- FIVB ranking: 14 (24 May 2026)

Uniforms
Home	Away

World Championship
- Appearances: 5 (First in 1956)
- Best result: 9th place (2022)

European Championship
- Appearances: 13 (First in 1967)
- Best result: (bronze) (2013)
- Top Volley Belgium

Belgium women's national volleyball team
Medal record

European Championship
Bronze medal – third place	2013 Germany/Switzerland	

European League
Silver medal – second place	2013 Varna	
Bronze medal – third place	2023 Piatra Neamt / Lund	
Bronze medal – third place	2024 Ostrava	

Challenger Cup
Silver medal – second place	2022 Zadar	

The Belgium women's national volleyball team represents Belgium in international women's volleyball competitions and friendly matches.

Their nickname is Yellow Tigers.

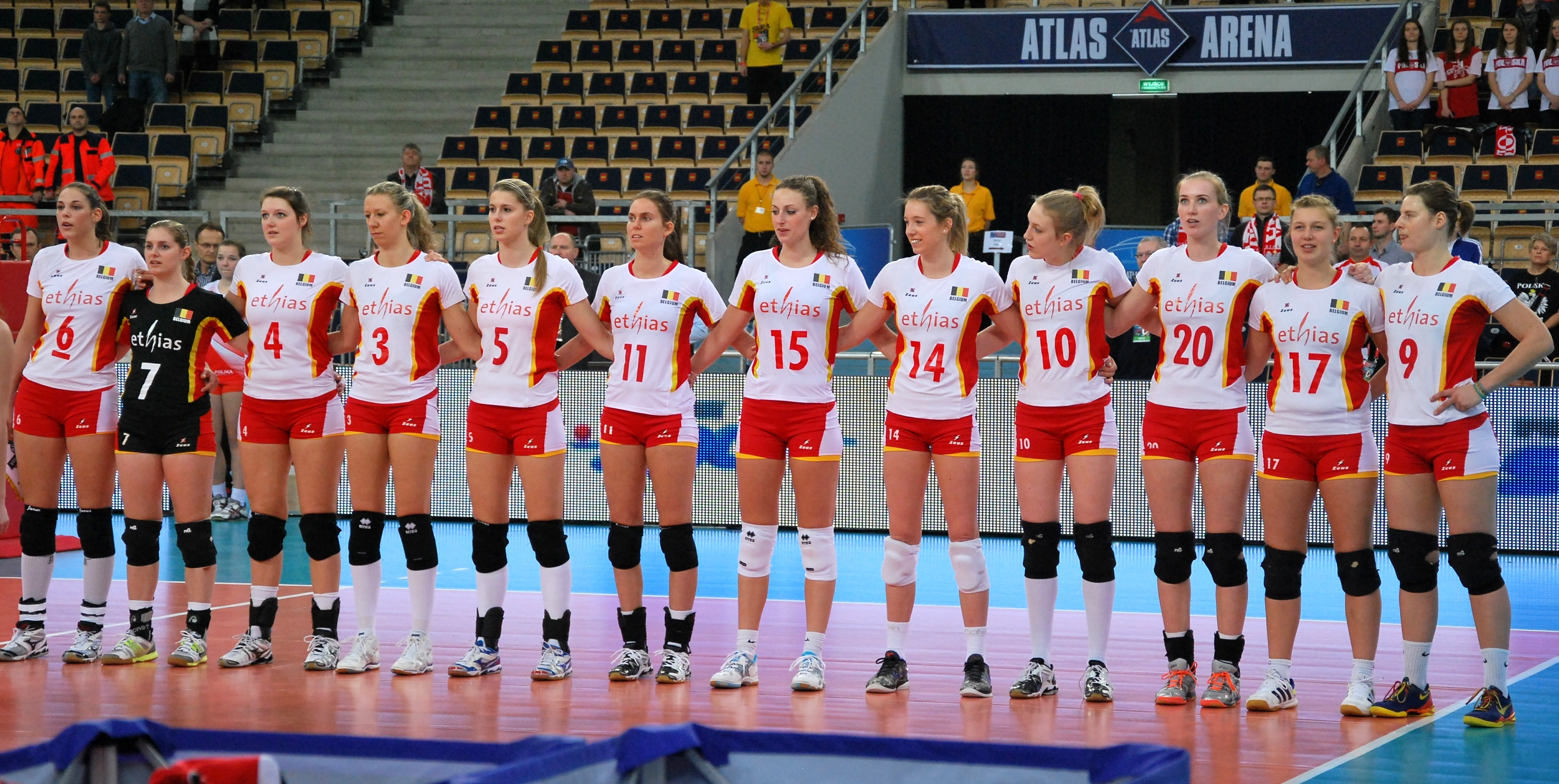
The Belgium women's national volleyball team in 2014

== Competitive record ==
=== World Championship ===
Champions Runners-up Third place Fourth place

World Championship record
Year	Round	Position	Pld	W	L	SW	SL
(Soviet Union) 1952	did not participate						
(France) 1956	Group stage	13th	2	0	2	0	6
(Brazil) 1960	did not participate						
(Soviet Union) 1962	did not participate						
(Japan) 1967	did not participate						
(Bulgaria) 1970	did not qualify						
(Mexico) 1974	did not qualify						
(Soviet Union) 1978	Group stage	22nd	3	0	3	0	9
(Peru) 1982	did not qualify						
(Czechoslovakia) 1986	did not qualify						
(China) 1990	did not qualify						
(Brazil) 1994	did not qualify						
(Japan) 1998	did not qualify						
(Germany) 2002	did not qualify						
(Japan) 2006	did not qualify						
(Japan) 2010	did not qualify						
(Italy) 2014	Second round	11th place	9	4	5	15	16
(Japan) 2018	did not qualify						
(Netherlands) / (Poland) 2022	Second round	9th place	9	5	4	18	13
(Thailand) 2025	Round of 16	11th place	4	2	2	9	6
(Canada) / (United States) 2027	To be determined						
(Philippines) 2029	To be determined						
Total	0 titles	5/22	27	11	16	42	50

=== European Championship ===
Champions Runners-up Third place Fourth place

European Championship record
Year	Round	Position	Pld	W	L	SW	SL
(Czechoslovakia) 1949	did not participate						
(Bulgaria) 1950	did not participate						
(France) 1951	did not participate						
(Romania) 1955	did not participate						
(Czechoslovakia) 1958	did not participate						
(Romania) 1963	did not participate						
(Turkey) 1967	Group stage	14th	3	0	3	0	9
(Italy) 1971	did not participate						
(Socialist Federal Republic of Yugoslavia) 1975	Group stage	12th	3	0	3	1	9
(Finland) 1977	did not qualify						
(France) 1979	Group stage	12th	3	0	3	0	9
(Bulgaria) 1981	did not qualify						
(East Germany) 1983	did not qualify						
(Netherlands) 1985	did not qualify						
(Belgium) 1987	Group stage	12th	5	0	5	0	15
(West Germany) 1989	did not qualify						
(Italy) 1991	did not qualify						
(Czech Republic) 1993	did not qualify						
(Netherlands) 1995	did not qualify						
(Czech Republic) 1997	did not qualify						
(Italy) 1999	did not qualify						
(Bulgaria) 2001	did not qualify						
(Turkey) 2003	did not qualify						
(Croatia) 2005	did not qualify						
(Belgium) / (Luxembourg) 2007	Group stage	7th	3	1	2	6	6
(Poland) 2009	Group stage	11th	3	1	2	7	7
(Italy) / (Serbia) 2011	did not qualify						
(Germany) / (Switzerland) 2013	Semi-final	3rd	5	4	1	17	9
(Belgium) / (Netherlands) 2015	Quarterfinals	6th	5	3	2	9	7
(Azerbaijan) / (Georgia (country)) 2017	Group stage	14th	3	0	3	3	9
(Hungary) / (Poland) / (Slovakia) / (Turkey) 2019	Round of 16	9th	6	4	2	13	9
(Serbia) / (Bulgaria) / (Croatia) / (Romania) 2021	Round of 16	13th	6	3	3	11	11
(Belgium) / (Italy) / (Germany) / (Estonia) 2023	Round of 16	15th	6	2	4	7	13
(Azerbaijan) / (Czech Republic) / (Sweden) / (Turkey) 2026	Round of 16	9th	6	5	1	17	7
(Slovakia) / (Spain) / (N/A) / (N/A) 2028	To be determined						
Total	0 titles	12/35	57	23	34	74	113

=== World Grand Prix ===
Year	Position	W	L
(Japan) 2014	13th	8	8
(United States) 2015	10th	2	7
(Thailand) 2016	11th	1	8
(China) 2017	12th	0	9
Total	4/25	11	32

=== FIVB Nations League ===
Champions Runners-up Third place Fourth place

Nations League record
Year	Round	Position	GP	MW	ML	SW	SL	Squad
(China) 2018	Preliminary Round	13th	15	4	11	18	36	Squad
(China) 2019	Preliminary Round	7th	15	8	7	28	29	Squad
(Italy) 2021	Preliminary Round	9th	15	8	7	27	34	Squad
(Turkey) 2022	Relegated	15th	12	4	8	18	32	Squad
(United States) 2023	Did not qualify							
(Thailand) 2024	Did not qualify							
(Poland) 2025	Preliminary Round	14th	12	4	8	15	29	Squad
(Macau) 2026	Preliminary Round	13th	12	4	8	17	32	Squad
(N/A) 2027	qualified							
Total	0 Titles	7/9	81	32	49	123	192	—

== Current squad ==
The following is the Belgian roster in the 2018 FIVB Volleyball Women's Nations League squads.

Head coach: Gert Vande Broek

No.	Name	Date of birth	Height	Weight	Spike	Block	2017–18 club
1	Lisa Neyt	2 September 1993	1.75 m (5 ft 9 in)	71 kg (157 lb)	277 cm (109 in)	265 cm (104 in)	(Belgium) Gent
2	Elise Van Sas	1 August 1997	1.88 m (6 ft 2 in)	74 kg (163 lb)	296 cm (117 in)	281 cm (111 in)	(Belgium) Oudegem
3	Britt Herbots	24 September 1999	1.82 m (6 ft 0 in)	63 kg (139 lb)	310 cm (120 in)	290 cm (110 in)	(France) Mulhouse
4	Nathalie Lemmens	12 March 1995	1.92 m (6 ft 4 in)	85 kg (187 lb)	311 cm (122 in)	288 cm (113 in)	(Belgium) Asterix Kieldrecht
6	Laure Flament	18 June 1998	1.82 m (6 ft 0 in)	76 kg (168 lb)	295 cm (116 in)	288 cm (113 in)	(Belgium) Gent
7	Celine Van Gestel	7 November 1997	1.83 m (6 ft 0 in)	70 kg (150 lb)	310 cm (120 in)	280 cm (110 in)	(Belgium) Asterix Kieldrecht
8	Kaja Grobelna	4 January 1995	1.88 m (6 ft 2 in)	72 kg (159 lb)	318 cm (125 in)	299 cm (118 in)	(Poland) Budowlani Łódź
11	Iris Vandewiele	7 March 1994	1.89 m (6 ft 2 in)	71 kg (157 lb)	295 cm (116 in)	286 cm (113 in)	(Belgium) Gent
12	Dominika Strumilo	26 December 1996	1.87 m (6 ft 2 in)	63 kg (139 lb)	311 cm (122 in)	292 cm (115 in)	(Germany) Dresdner
13	Marlies Janssens	4 June 1997	1.93 m (6 ft 4 in)	79 kg (174 lb)	312 cm (123 in)	299 cm (118 in)	(Belgium) Asterix Kieldrecht
14	Lotte Vandendriessche	5 April 1997	1.79 m (5 ft 10 in)	79 kg (174 lb)	293 cm (115 in)	280 cm (110 in)	(Belgium) Oudegem
16	Karolina Goliat	25 October 1996	1.90 m (6 ft 3 in)	79 kg (174 lb)	308 cm (121 in)	295 cm (116 in)	(France) Saint-Raphaël
17	Ilka Van de Vyver (c)	26 January 1993	1.70 m (5 ft 7 in)	79 kg (174 lb)	296 cm (117 in)	273 cm (107 in)	(Germany) Vilsbiburg
18	Oriane Moulin	18 February 2000	1.81 m (5 ft 11 in)	63 kg (139 lb)	303 cm (119 in)	287 cm (113 in)	(Belgium) Tchalou
19	Silke Van Avermaet	2 June 1999	1.92 m (6 ft 4 in)	76 kg (168 lb)	311 cm (122 in)	290 cm (110 in)	(Belgium) Asterix Kieldrecht
20	Jodie Guilliams	26 April 1997	1.80 m (5 ft 11 in)	73 kg (161 lb)	305 cm (120 in)	289 cm (114 in)	(Belgium) Asterix Kieldrecht
21	Manon Stragier	12 March 1999	1.82 m (6 ft 0 in)	69 kg (152 lb)	308 cm (121 in)	283 cm (111 in)	(Belgium) Richa Michelbeke
22	Anna Valkenborg	4 January 1998	1.74 m (5 ft 9 in)	59 kg (130 lb)	290 cm (110 in)	270 cm (110 in)	(Belgium) Datovoc Tongeren
23	Bieke Kindt	11 February 2000	1.91 m (6 ft 3 in)	74 kg (163 lb)	302 cm (119 in)	284 cm (112 in)	(Belgium) Oudegem
25	Britt Rampelberg	5 June 2000	1.65 m (5 ft 5 in)	58 kg (128 lb)	283 cm (111 in)	269 cm (106 in)	(Belgium) Vilvoorde
28	Lara Nagels	3 June 1997	1.80 m (5 ft 11 in)	65 kg (143 lb)	290 cm (110 in)	274 cm (108 in)	(Belgium) Oudegem

Squad for 2023 European championship

2 Elise Van Sas S

3 Britt Herbots OH

4 Nathalie Lemmens MB

7 Celine Van Gestel OH

9 Nel Demeyer L

10 Pauline Martin OP

13 Marlies Janssens MB

15 Jutta Van de Vyver S

18 Britt Rampelberg L

19 Silke Van Avermaet MB

21 Manon Stragier OH

23 Noor Debouck OH
