= 2016 Montreux Volley Masters squads =

== Pool A ==
=== Belgium ===
The following is the Belgian roster in the 2016 Montreux Volley Masters.

Head coach: Gert Vande Broek

| No. | Name | Date of birth | Height | Weight | Spike | Block | 2017 club |
|---|---|---|---|---|---|---|---|
| 2 | Jasmien Biebauw | 24 September 1990 | 1.8 m (5 ft 11 in) | 78 kg (172 lb) | 295 cm (116 in) | 274 cm (108 in) | (Belgium) Asterix Kieldrecht |
| 3 | Britt Herbots | 24 September 1999 | 1.82 m (6 ft 0 in) | 63 kg (139 lb) | 310 cm (120 in) | 283 cm (111 in) | (Belgium) Asterix Kieldrecht |
| 4 | Valerie Courtois | 1 November 1990 Bilzen | 1.71 m (5 ft 7 in) | 67 kg (148 lb) | 280 cm (110 in) | 270 cm (110 in) | (Germany) Dresden |
| 5 | Laura Heyrman | 17 May 1993 Beveren-waas | 1.86 m (6 ft 1 in) | 74 kg (163 lb) | 310 cm (120 in) | 280 cm (110 in) | (Italy) Lui-Jo Modena |
| 6 | Charlotte Leys | 18 March 1989 Poperinge | 1.86 m (6 ft 1 in) | 77 kg (170 lb) | 305 cm (120 in) | 293 cm (115 in) | (Turkey) Galatasaray S.K. |
| | Kaja Grobelna | 4 January 1995 Radom | 1.88 m (6 ft 2 in) | 72 kg (159 lb) | 318 cm (125 in) | 289 cm (114 in) | (Germany) Allianz MTV Stuttgart |
| | Freya Aelbrecht | 10 February 1990 Genk | 1.86 m (6 ft 1 in) | 82 kg (181 lb) | 308 cm (121 in) | 282 cm (111 in) | (Italy) Foppadretti Bergamo |
| 10 | Lise Van Hecke | 1 July 1992 Sint Niklaas | 1.85 m (6 ft 1 in) | 79 kg (174 lb) | 299 cm (118 in) | 281 cm (111 in) | (Brazil) Nestlé Sao Paulo |
| 11 | Dominika Sobolska | 3 December 1991 Menen - Belgium | 1.87 m (6 ft 2 in) | 80 kg (180 lb) | 315 cm (124 in) | 285 cm (112 in) | (Poland) Dabrowa |
| 12 | Dominika Strumilo | 26 December 1996 | 1.87 m (6 ft 2 in) | 63 kg (139 lb) | 311 cm (122 in) | 292 cm (115 in) | (Belgium) Asterix Kieldrecht |
| 16 | Celine Van Gestel | 7 November 1997 | 1.83 m (6 ft 0 in) | 70 kg (150 lb) | 310 cm (120 in) | 280 cm (110 in) | (Belgium) Asterix Kieldrecht |
| 17 | Ilka Van de Vyver | 26 January 1993 | 1.7 m (5 ft 7 in) | 79 kg (174 lb) | 296 cm (117 in) | 273 cm (107 in) | (Slovenia) Calcit Ljubljana |
| 18 | Britt Ruysschaert | 27 May 1994 | 1.74 m (5 ft 9 in) | 60 kg (130 lb) | 302 cm (119 in) | 281 cm (111 in) | (Belgium) Asterix Kieldrecht |
| 19 | Amber De Tant | 22 March 1998 | 1.77 m (5 ft 10 in) | 66 kg (146 lb) | 303 cm (119 in) | 280 cm (110 in) | (Belgium) Asterix Kieldrecht |

=== Brazil ===
The following is the Brazilian roster in the 2016 Montreux Volley Masters.

Head coach: Wagner Luiz Coppini Fernandes

| No. | Name | Date of birth | Height | Weight | Spike | Block | 2017 club |
|---|---|---|---|---|---|---|---|
| 1 | Drussyla Costa | 1 July 1996 | 1.82 m (6 ft 0 in) | 73 kg (161 lb) | 304 cm (120 in) | 286 cm (113 in) | (Brazil) Rexona-Ades |
| 2 | Lyara Medeiros | 19 September 1996 | 1.84 m (6 ft 0 in) | 67 kg (148 lb) | 297 cm (117 in) | 285 cm (112 in) | (Brazil) Bradesco |
| 3 | Francynne Jacintho | 16 July 1992 | 1.9 m (6 ft 3 in) | 66 kg (146 lb) | 304 cm (120 in) | 293 cm (115 in) | (Brazil) Rexona-Sesc |
| 4 | Mara Leão | 26 July 1991 | 1.88 m (6 ft 2 in) | 77 kg (170 lb) | 310 cm (120 in) | 297 cm (117 in) | (Brazil) Fluminense F.C. |
| 5 | Juma Silva | 17 January 1993 | 1.79 m (5 ft 10 in) | 65 kg (143 lb) | | | |
| 6 | Saraelen Lima | 16 April 1994 | 1.84 m (6 ft 0 in) | 76 kg (168 lb) | 302 cm (119 in) | 282 cm (111 in) | São Caetano |
| 7 | Lays Freitas | 13 October 1995 | 1.85 m (6 ft 1 in) | 75 kg (165 lb) | | | |
| 8 | Ana Paula da Cruz | 20 October 1993 | 1.87 m (6 ft 2 in) | 76 kg (168 lb) | 305 cm (120 in) | 295 cm (116 in) | (Brazil) São Caetano |
| 9 | Michelle Pavão | 31 October 1986 | 1.78 m (5 ft 10 in) | 62 kg (137 lb) | 295 cm (116 in) | 283 cm (111 in) | (Brazil) Brasília Vôlei |
| 10 | Rosamaria Montibeller (C) | 9 April 1994 | 1.85 m (6 ft 1 in) | 76 kg (168 lb) | 300 cm (120 in) | 288 cm (113 in) | (Brazil) AMIL |
| 11 | Lorenne Teixeira | 8 January 1996 | 1.87 m (6 ft 2 in) | 72 kg (159 lb) | 306 cm (120 in) | 289 cm (114 in) | (Brazil) Rexona-Ades |
| 12 | Gabriella Souza | 14 December 1993 | 1.75 m (5 ft 9 in) | 70 kg (150 lb) | | | |
| 13 | Lais Vasques | 12 February 1996 | 1.71 m (5 ft 7 in) | 70 kg (150 lb) | 275 cm (108 in) | 274 cm (108 in) | (Brazil) Minas T.C. |
| 14 | Naiane Rios | 29 November 1994 | 1.79 m (5 ft 10 in) | 63 kg (139 lb) | 276 cm (109 in) | 281 cm (111 in) | (Brazil) E.C. Pinheiros |
| 15 | Maira Claro | 7 March 1995 | 1.87 m (6 ft 2 in) | 62 kg (137 lb) | 300 cm (120 in) | 278 cm (109 in) | (Brazil) E.C. Pinheiros |
| 16 | Heloiza Pereira | 2 November 1990 | 1.87 m (6 ft 2 in) | 77 kg (170 lb) | 305 cm (120 in) | 288 cm (113 in) | (Brazil) Sollys/Nestlé |
| 18 | Érica Lima | 21 May 1996 | 1.65 m (5 ft 5 in) | 66 kg (146 lb) | 224 cm (88 in) | 214 cm (84 in) | (Brazil) Bradesco |

=== China ===
The following is the Chinese roster in the 2016 Montreux Volley Masters.

Head coach:

| No. | Name | Date of birth | Height | Weight | Spike | Block | 2017 club |
|---|---|---|---|---|---|---|---|
| 1 | Zhan Chen | 11 October 1990 | 1.80 m (5 ft 11 in) | 65 kg (143 lb) | 300 cm (120 in) | 295 cm (116 in) | (China) Jiangsu |
| 2 | Xia Ding | 13 January 1990 | 1.8 m (5 ft 11 in) | 61 kg (134 lb) | 305 cm (120 in) | 300 cm (120 in) | (China) Liaoning |
| 3 | Qian Zhang | 20 February 1997 | 1.93 m (6 ft 4 in) | 70 kg (150 lb) | 313 cm (123 in) | 302 cm (119 in) | (China) Shandong |
| 4 | Xiaotong Liu | 16 February 1990 | 1.88 m (6 ft 2 in) | 70 kg (150 lb) | 312 cm (123 in) | 300 cm (120 in) | (China) Beijing |
| 6 | Junjing Yang | 15 May 1989 | 1.9 m (6 ft 3 in) | 70 kg (150 lb) | 308 cm (121 in) | 300 cm (120 in) | (China) Army |
| 7 | Qiuyue Wei | 26 September 1988 | 1.82 m (6 ft 0 in) | 65 kg (143 lb) | 305 cm (120 in) | 300 cm (120 in) | (China) Tianjin |
| 10 | Di Yao | 15 August 1992 | 1.82 m (6 ft 0 in) | 65 kg (143 lb) | 306 cm (120 in) | 298 cm (117 in) | (China) Tianjin |
| 12 | Ruoqi Hui (C) | 4 March 1991 | 1.92 m (6 ft 4 in) | 87 kg (192 lb) | 315 cm (124 in) | 305 cm (120 in) | (China) Jiangsu Volleyball Club |
| 13 | Xiaoya Zhang | 4 October 1992 | 1.89 m (6 ft 2 in) | 60 kg (130 lb) | 310 cm (120 in) | 300 cm (120 in) | (China) Sichuan |
| 14 | Xiangyu Gong | 21 April 1997 | 1.86 m (6 ft 1 in) | 72 kg (159 lb) | 313 cm (123 in) | 302 cm (119 in) | (China) Jiangsu |
| 16 | Danna Shan | 8 October 1991 | 1.68 m (5 ft 6 in) | 60 kg (130 lb) | 290 cm (110 in) | 285 cm (112 in) | (China) Zhejiang |
| 18 | Mengjie Wang | 14 November 1995 | 1.72 m (5 ft 8 in) | 65 kg (143 lb) | 289 cm (114 in) | 280 cm (110 in) | (China) Shandong |
| 19 | Yanhan Liu | 19 January 1993 | 1.88 m (6 ft 2 in) | 75 kg (165 lb) | 315 cm (124 in) | 305 cm (120 in) | (China) Army |
| 20 | Yixin Zheng | 6 May 1995 | 1.87 m (6 ft 2 in) | 69 kg (152 lb) | 305 cm (120 in) | 300 cm (120 in) | (China) Fujian |
| 21 | Ning Wang | 14 May 1994 | 1.89 m (6 ft 2 in) | 60 kg (130 lb) | 312 cm (123 in) | 303 cm (119 in) | (China) Tianjin |
| 22 | Siyu Qin | 2 May 1994 | 1.84 m (6 ft 0 in) | 65 kg (143 lb) | 305 cm (120 in) | 300 cm (120 in) | (China) Shanghai |
| 23 | Liyi Chen | 27 April 1989 | 1.84 m (6 ft 0 in) | 75 kg (165 lb) | 302 cm (119 in) | 290 cm (110 in) | (China) Tianjin |
| 24 | Yunlu Wang | 20 May 1996 | 1.92 m (6 ft 4 in) | 82 kg (181 lb) | 310 cm (120 in) | 301 cm (119 in) | (China) Army |
| 25 | Na Wang | 25 February 1990 | 1.78 m (5 ft 10 in) | 63 kg (139 lb) | 305 cm (120 in) | 295 cm (116 in) | (China) Zhejiang |

=== Turkey ===
The following is the Turkish roster in the 2016 Montreux Volley Masters.

Head coach: Ferhat Akbas

| No. | Name | Date of birth | Height | Weight | Spike | Block | 2015 club |
|---|---|---|---|---|---|---|---|
| 1 | Hatice Gizem Orge | 26 April 1993 | 1.7 m (5 ft 7 in) | 59 kg (130 lb) | 270 cm (110 in) | 260 cm (100 in) | (Turkey) VakıfBank |
| 2 | Seniye Merve Dalbeler | 27 June 1987 | 1.82 m (6 ft 0 in) | 73 kg (161 lb) | 310 cm (120 in) | 300 cm (120 in) | (Turkey) Fenerbahçe |
| 3 | Gizem Karadayı | 14 January 1987 | 1.78 m (5 ft 10 in) | 60 kg (130 lb) | 290 cm (110 in) | 285 cm (112 in) | (Turkey) VakıfBank |
| 4 | Tutku Burcu Yuzgenc | 15 January 1999 | 1.88 m (6 ft 2 in) | 61 kg (134 lb) | 298 cm (117 in) | 295 cm (116 in) | (Turkey) Halkbank |
| 5 | Kübra Akman | 13 October 1994 | 1.97 m (6 ft 6 in) | 89 kg (196 lb) | 314 cm (124 in) | 305 cm (120 in) | (Turkey) VakıfBank |
| 6 | Polen Uslupehlivan | 27 August 1990 | 1.93 m (6 ft 4 in) | 65 kg (143 lb) | 305 cm (120 in) | 298 cm (117 in) | (Turkey) Fenerbahçe |
| 7 | Hande Baladin | 1 September 1997 | 1.89 m (6 ft 2 in) | 71 kg (157 lb) | 295 cm (116 in) | 293 cm (115 in) | (Turkey) Eczacibasi |
| 8 | Meliha Ismailoglu | 17 September 1993 | 1.88 m (6 ft 2 in) | 70 kg (150 lb) | 304 cm (120 in) | 301 cm (119 in) | (Turkey) Fenerbahce Grundig |
| 9 | Asli Kalac | 13 December 1995 | 1.83 m (6 ft 0 in) | 73 kg (161 lb) | 300 cm (120 in) | 290 cm (110 in) | (Turkey) Galatasaray Daikin |
| 10 | Güldeniz Onal (C) | 25 March 1986 | 1.83 m (6 ft 0 in) | 75 kg (165 lb) | 302 cm (119 in) | 293 cm (115 in) | (Turkey) VakıfBank |
| 11 | Naz Aydemir Akyol | 14 August 1990 | 1.86 m (6 ft 1 in) | 75 kg (165 lb) | 290 cm (110 in) | 249 cm (98 in) | (Turkey) VakıfBank |
| 12 | Melis Durul | 21 October 1993 | 1.78 m (5 ft 10 in) | 53 kg (117 lb) | 280 cm (110 in) | 275 cm (108 in) | (Turkey) Sariyer |
| 13 | Melike Neziha Yilmaz | 19 January 1995 | 1.85 m (6 ft 1 in) | 70 kg (150 lb) | 295 cm (116 in) | 285 cm (112 in) | (Turkey) Sariyer |
| 14 | Eda Erdem Dündar | 22 June 1987 | 1.88 m (6 ft 2 in) | 73 kg (161 lb) | 311 cm (122 in) | 305 cm (120 in) | (Turkey) Fenerbahce Grundig |
| 15 | Arelya Karasoy | 14 December 1996 | 1.81 m (5 ft 11 in) | 73 kg (161 lb) | 287 cm (113 in) | 280 cm (110 in) | (Turkey) Sariyer |
| 16 | Ceylan Arisan | 1 January 1994 | 1.93 m (6 ft 4 in) | 79 kg (174 lb) | 306 cm (120 in) | 297 cm (117 in) | (Turkey) Besiktas |
| 17 | Nursevil Aydinlar | 28 November 1995 | 1.87 m (6 ft 2 in) | 64 kg (141 lb) | 293 cm (115 in) | 285 cm (112 in) | (Turkey) Galatasaray Daikin |
| 18 | Zehra Gunes | 7 July 1999 | 1.94 m (6 ft 4 in) | 82 kg (181 lb) | 309 cm (122 in) | 255 cm (100 in) | (Turkey) VakıfBank |
| 19 | Ezgi Dilik | 13 December 1995 | 1.83 m (6 ft 0 in) | 73 kg (161 lb) | 300 cm (120 in) | 290 cm (110 in) | (Turkey) Galatasaray |
| 20 | Gözde Yilmaz | 9 September 1991 | 1.95 m (6 ft 5 in) | 78 kg (172 lb) | 306 cm (120 in) | 299 cm (118 in) | (Turkey) Futura Volley s.s.d.r.l |
| 21 | Özge Nur Yurtdagülen | 6 August 1993 | 1.90 m (6 ft 3 in) | 67 kg (148 lb) | 307 cm (121 in) | 298 cm (117 in) | (Turkey) Sariyer |
| 25 | Fatma Yildirim | 3 January 1990 | 1.79 m (5 ft 10 in) | 65 kg (143 lb) | 288 cm (113 in) | 280 cm (110 in) | (Turkey) Halkbank |

== Pool B ==
=== Netherlands ===
The following is the Thai roster in the 2016 Montreux Volley Masters.

| No. | Name | Date of birth | Height | Weight | Spike | Block | 2015 club |
|---|---|---|---|---|---|---|---|
| 1 | Kirsten Knip | 14 September 1992 | 1.75 m (5 ft 9 in) | 70 kg (150 lb) | 281 cm (111 in) | 275 cm (108 in) | (Germany) Rote Raben Vilsbiburg |
| 2 | Femke Stoltenborg | 30 July 1991 | 1.89 m (6 ft 2 in) | 81 kg (179 lb) | 303 cm (119 in) | 299 cm (118 in) | (Germany) MTV Stuttgart |
| 3 | Yvon Belien | 28 December 1993 | 1.88 m (6 ft 2 in) | 73 kg (161 lb) | 307 cm (121 in) | 303 cm (119 in) | (Italy) Piacenza |
| 4 | Celeste Plak | 26 October 1995 | 1.90 m (6 ft 3 in) | 87 kg (192 lb) | 314 cm (124 in) | 302 cm (119 in) | (Italy) Volley Bergamo |
| 5 | Robin De Kruijf | 5 May 1991 | 1.92 m (6 ft 4 in) | 81 kg (179 lb) | 313 cm (123 in) | 300 cm (120 in) | (Turkey) VakıfBank |
| 6 | Maret Balkestein-Grothues | 16 September 1988 | 1.80 m (5 ft 11 in) | 68 kg (150 lb) | 304 cm (120 in) | 285 cm (112 in) | (Poland) PGE Atom |
| 7 | Quinta Steenbergen | 2 April 1985 | 1.89 m (6 ft 2 in) | 75 kg (165 lb) | 309 cm (122 in) | 300 cm (120 in) | (Czechoslovakia) VK Prostějov |
| 8 | Judith Pietersen (C) | 3 July 1989 | 1.88 m (6 ft 2 in) | 73 kg (161 lb) | 306 cm (120 in) | 296 cm (117 in) | (Italy) Scandicci |
| 9 | Myrthe Schoot | 29 August 1988 | 1.82 m (6 ft 0 in) | 70 kg (150 lb) | 292 cm (115 in) | 286 cm (113 in) | (Germany) Dresdner SC |
| 10 | Lonneke Slöetjes | 15 November 1990 | 1.91 m (6 ft 3 in) | 76 kg (168 lb) | 322 cm (127 in) | 315 cm (124 in) | (Turkey) VakıfBank |
| 11 | Anne Buijs | 2 December 1991 | 1.91 m (6 ft 3 in) | 73 kg (161 lb) | 317 cm (125 in) | 299 cm (118 in) | (Turkey) VakıfBank |
| 12 | Celia Diemkoudre | 30 July 1992 | 1.82 m (6 ft 0 in) | 66 kg (146 lb) | 300 cm (120 in) | 290 cm (110 in) | (Netherlands) Sliedrecht Sport |
| 13 | Britt Bongaerts | 3 November 1996 | 1.85 m (6 ft 1 in) | 68 kg (150 lb) | 296 cm (117 in) | 284 cm (112 in) | (Germany) Ladies in Black Aachen |
| 14 | Laura Dijkema | 18 February 1990 | 1.84 m (6 ft 0 in) | 70 kg (150 lb) | 293 cm (115 in) | 279 cm (110 in) | (Germany) Dresdner SC |
| 16 | Debby Stam-Pilon | 24 July 1984 | 1.84 m (6 ft 0 in) | 69 kg (152 lb) | 303 cm (119 in) | 281 cm (111 in) | (France) Volero Le Cannet |
| 17 | Nicole Oude Luttikhuis | 26 December 1997 | 1.91 m (6 ft 3 in) | 74 kg (163 lb) | 298 cm (117 in) | 287 cm (113 in) | (Netherlands) Eurosped TVT |
| 18 | Marlies Wagendorp | 10 November 1993 | 1.93 m (6 ft 4 in) | 90 kg (200 lb) | 312 cm (123 in) | 308 cm (121 in) | (Netherlands) Sliedrecht Sport |
| 19 | Nika Daalderop | 29 November 1998 | 1.874 m (6 ft 2 in) | 67 kg (148 lb) | 303 cm (119 in) | 289 cm (114 in) | (Netherlands) Talent Team Papendal |
| 20 | Klaske Sikkes | 7 April 1993 | 1.88 m (6 ft 2 in) | 74 kg (163 lb) | 299 cm (118 in) | 286 cm (113 in) | (Netherlands) VC Sneek |
| 21 | Tessa Polder | 10 October 1997 | 1.89 m (6 ft 2 in) | 73 kg (161 lb) | 297 cm (117 in) | 286 cm (113 in) | (Netherlands) Sliedrecht Sport |
| 22 | Nicole Koolhaas | 31 January 1991 | 1.98 m (6 ft 6 in) | 77 kg (170 lb) | 3,107 cm (1,223 in) | 300 cm (120 in) | (Switzerland) VFM Volley Franches-Montagnes |
| 23 | Juliet Lohuis | 10 September 1996 | 1.9 m (6 ft 3 in) | 77 kg (170 lb) | 305 cm (120 in) | 295 cm (116 in) | (Netherlands) Alterno |

=== Serbia ===
The following is the Thai roster in the 2016 Montreux Volley Masters.

Head Coach: Terzic Zoran

| No. | Name | Date of birth | Height | Weight | Spike | Block | 2016 club |
|---|---|---|---|---|---|---|---|
| 1 | Bianka Busa | 25 July 1994 | 1.87 m (6 ft 2 in) | 74 kg (163 lb) | 293 cm (9 ft 7 in) | 282 cm (9 ft 3 in) | (Romania) CSM Targoviste |
| 2 | Slađana Mirković | 8 October 1995 | 1.85 m (6 ft 1 in) | 70 kg (150 lb) | 293 cm (9 ft 7 in) | 282 cm (9 ft 3 in) | (Serbia) Dinamo Pancevo |
| 3 | Sanja Malagurski | 8 June 1990 | 1.93 m (6 ft 4 in) | 74 kg (163 lb) | 305 cm (10 ft 0 in) | 295 cm (9 ft 8 in) | (Turkey) Trabzon Idman Ocagi |
| 4 | Bojana Živković | 29 March 1988 | 1.86 m (6 ft 1 in) | 72 kg (159 lb) | 300 cm (9 ft 10 in) | 292 cm (9 ft 7 in) | (Switzerland) Volero Zurich |
| 5 | Mina Popović | 16 September 1994 | 1.87 m (6 ft 2 in) | 73 kg (161 lb) | 315 cm (10 ft 4 in) | 305 cm (10 ft 0 in) | (Italy) Obiettivo Vicenza |
| 6 | Tijana Malešević | 18 March 19,916 | 1.85 m (6 ft 1 in) | 78 kg (172 lb) | 300 cm (9 ft 10 in) | 286 cm (9 ft 5 in) | (Italy) Igor Gorgonzola Novara |
| 7 | Brižitka Molnar | 28 July 1985 | 1.82 m (6 ft 0 in) | 69 kg (152 lb) | 304 cm (10 ft 0 in) | 290 cm (9 ft 6 in) | (Greece) Panathinaikos Athens |
| 8 | Danica Radenković (C) | 9 October 1992 | 1.85 m (6 ft 1 in) | 70 kg (150 lb) | 300 cm (9 ft 10 in) | 294 cm (9 ft 8 in) | (Poland) Atom Trefl Sopot |
| 9 | Brankica Mihajlović | 13 April 1991 | 1.90 m (6 ft 3 in) | 83 kg (183 lb) | 302 cm (9 ft 11 in) | 290 cm (9 ft 6 in) | (Turkey) Fenerbahce SK Istanbul |
| 10 | Maja Ognjenović (C) | 6 August 1984 | 1.83 m (6 ft 0 in) | 67 kg (148 lb) | 300 cm (9 ft 10 in) | 293 cm (9 ft 7 in) | (Italy) Nordmeccanica Piacenza |
| 11 | Stefana Veljković | 9 January 1990 | 1.9 m (6 ft 3 in) | 76 kg (168 lb) | 320 cm (10 ft 6 in) | 305 cm (10 ft 0 in) | (Poland) Chemic Police SA |
| 12 | Jelena Nikolić | 13 April 1982 | 1.94 m (6 ft 4 in) | 79 kg (174 lb) | 315 cm (10 ft 4 in) | 300 cm (9 ft 10 in) | (Turkey) Bursa Buyuksehir |
| 13 | Ana Bjelica | 3 April 1992 | 1.9 m (6 ft 3 in) | 70 kg (150 lb) | 310 cm (10 ft 2 in) | 305 cm (10 ft 0 in) | (Turkey) Salihli Belediyespor |
| 14 | Maja Savić | 14 August 1993 | 1.89 m (6 ft 2 in) | 70 kg (150 lb) | 305 cm (10 ft 0 in) | 295 cm (9 ft 8 in) | (Poland) MKS Muszyna |
| 15 | Jovana Stevanović | 30 June 1992 | 1.92 m (6 ft 4 in) | 72 kg (159 lb) | 300 cm (9 ft 10 in) | 295 cm (9 ft 8 in) | (Italy) Pomi Casalmaggiore |
| 16 | Milena Rašić | 25 October 1998 | 1.91 m (6 ft 3 in) | 72 kg (159 lb) | 315 cm (10 ft 4 in) | 310 cm (10 ft 2 in) | (Turkey) VakıfBank |
| 17 | Silvija Popović | 15 March 1986 | 1.78 m (5 ft 10 in) | 65 kg (143 lb) | 286 cm (9 ft 5 in) | 276 cm (9 ft 1 in) | (Switzerland) Volero Zürich |
| 18 | Suzana Ćebić | 9 November 1984 | 1.67 m (5 ft 6 in) | 60 kg (130 lb) | 279 cm (9 ft 2 in) | 255 cm (8 ft 4 in) | (Romania) CSM Targoviste |
| 19 | Tijana Bošković | 8 March 1997 | 1.88 m (6 ft 2 in) | 68 kg (150 lb) | 310 cm (10 ft 2 in) | 300 cm (9 ft 10 in) | (Turkey) Eczacibasi Istanbul |
| 20 | Ivana Đerisilo | 8 August 1983 | 1.88 m (6 ft 2 in) | 68 kg (150 lb) | 277 cm (9 ft 1 in) | 252 cm (8 ft 3 in) | (Poland) Atom Trefl Sopot |
| 21 | Jovana Vesović | 21 June 1987 | 1.82 m (6 ft 0 in) | 68 kg (150 lb) | 283 cm (9 ft 3 in) | 268 cm (8 ft 10 in) | (Romania) CSV Alba |
| 22 | Maja Aleksić | 6 June 1997 | 1.88 m (6 ft 2 in) | 72 kg (159 lb) | 298 cm (9 ft 9 in) | 285 cm (9 ft 4 in) | (Serbia) Vizura Beograd |

=== Switzerland ===
The following is the Thai roster in the 2016 Montreux Volley Masters.

| No. | Name | Date of birth | Height | Weight | Spike | Block | 2016 club |
|---|---|---|---|---|---|---|---|
| 1 | Zora Widmer | 12 April 1994 | 1.72 m (5 ft 8 in) | 60 kg (130 lb) | 270 cm (8 ft 10 in) | 268 cm (8 ft 10 in) | (Switzerland) VC Kanti Schaffhausen |
| 2 | Manon Bulliard | 30 July 1994 | 1.84 m (6 ft 0 in) | 70 kg (150 lb) | 280 cm (9 ft 2 in) | 270 cm (8 ft 10 in) | (Switzerland) Viteos NUC |
| 3 | Simona Belotti | 3 August 1993 | 1.69 m (5 ft 7 in) | 61 kg (134 lb) | 280 cm (9 ft 2 in) | 264 cm (8 ft 8 in) | (Switzerland) Volley Köniz |
| 4 | Gabi Schottroff | 8 February 1997 | 1.92 m (6 ft 4 in) | 78 kg (172 lb) | 302 cm (9 ft 11 in) | 285 cm (9 ft 4 in) | (Switzerland) Volley Top Luzern |
| 5 | Martina Halter | 9 May 1994 | 1.92 m (6 ft 4 in) | 78 kg (172 lb) | 300 cm (9 ft 10 in) | 278 cm (9 ft 1 in) | (Switzerland) Viteos NUC |
| 6 | Madlaina Matter | 19 October 1996 | 1.84 m (6 ft 0 in) | 61 kg (134 lb) | 309 cm (10 ft 2 in) | 290 cm (9 ft 6 in) | (Switzerland) Sm'Aesch Pfeffingen |
| 7 | Dijana Radulovic | 31 March 1998 | 1.80 m (5 ft 11 in) | 63 kg (139 lb) | 294 cm (9 ft 8 in) | 290 cm (9 ft 6 in) | (Switzerland) Volley Top Luzern |
| 8 | Maja Storck | 8 October 1998 | 1.84 m (6 ft 0 in) | 72 kg (159 lb) | 310 cm (10 ft 2 in) | 298 cm (9 ft 9 in) | (Switzerland) Sm'Aesch Pfeffingen |
| 9 | Tabea Dalliard | 18 July 1994 | 1.69 m (5 ft 7 in) | 63 kg (139 lb) | 274 cm (9 ft 0 in) | 265 cm (8 ft 8 in) | (Switzerland) Viteos NUC |
| 10 | Oriane Hämmerli | 18 June 1996 | 1.72 m (5 ft 8 in) | 68 kg (150 lb) | 272 cm (8 ft 11 in) | 263 cm (8 ft 8 in) | (Switzerland) VBC Cheseaux |
| 11 | Sarah Trösch | 28 September 1994 | 1.76 m (5 ft 9 in) | 70 kg (150 lb) | 280 cm (9 ft 2 in) | 270 cm (8 ft 10 in) | (Switzerland) Volley Köniz |
| 12 | Julie Lengweiler | 6 November 1998 | 1.88 m (6 ft 2 in) | 69 kg (152 lb) | 305 cm (10 ft 0 in) | 300 cm (9 ft 10 in) | (Switzerland) Volero Zürich |
| 13 | Elise Boillat | 30 April 1998 | 1.78 m (5 ft 10 in) | 64 kg (141 lb) | 293 cm (9 ft 7 in) | 280 cm (9 ft 2 in) | (Switzerland) Volley Franches Montagnes |
| 14 | Laura Künzler (C) | 25 December 1996 | 1.89 m (6 ft 2 in) | 69 kg (152 lb) | 298 cm (9 ft 9 in) | 287 cm (9 ft 5 in) | (Switzerland) Sm'Aesch Pfeffingen |
| 15 | Ségolène Girard | 18 November 1995 | 1.8 m (5 ft 11 in) | 66 kg (146 lb) | 280 cm (9 ft 2 in) | 275 cm (9 ft 0 in) | (Switzerland) Viteos NUC |
| 16 | Olivia Wassner | 22 March 1999 | 1.85 m (6 ft 1 in) | 70 kg (150 lb) | 297 cm (9 ft 9 in) | 290 cm (9 ft 6 in) | (Switzerland) Volley Top Luzern |
| 18 | Léa Montavon | 4 April 1996 | 1.89 m (6 ft 2 in) | 72 kg (159 lb) | 296 cm (9 ft 9 in) | 294 cm (9 ft 8 in) | (Switzerland) Volley Top Luzern |
| 19 | Thays Deprati | 14 April 1992 | 1.72 m (5 ft 8 in) | 65 kg (143 lb) | 266 cm (8 ft 9 in) | 253 cm (8 ft 4 in) | (Switzerland) Sm'Aesch Pfeffingen |
| 21 | Korina Perkovac | 7 July 1999 | 1.84 m (6 ft 0 in) | 64 kg (141 lb) | 293 cm (9 ft 7 in) | 250 cm (8 ft 2 in) | (Switzerland) Volley Nachwuchs Luzern |
| 22 | Patricia Schauss | 14 May 1988 | 1.88 m (6 ft 2 in) | 77 kg (170 lb) | 294 cm (9 ft 8 in) | 275 cm (9 ft 0 in) | (Switzerland) Volley Köniz |

=== Thailand ===
The following is the Thai roster in the 2016 Montreux Volley Masters.

Head Coach: Danai Sriwatcharamethakul

| No. | Name | Date of birth | Height | Weight | Spike | Block | 2016 club |
|---|---|---|---|---|---|---|---|
| 2 | Piyanut Pannoy | 10 November 1989 | 1.71 m (5 ft 7 in) | 68 kg (150 lb) | 280 cm (9 ft 2 in) | 275 cm (9 ft 0 in) | (Thailand) Supreme |
| 3 | Pornpun Guedpard | 5 May 1993 | 1.72 m (5 ft 8 in) | 63 kg (139 lb) | 294 cm (9 ft 8 in) | 290 cm (9 ft 6 in) | (Thailand) Bangkok Glass |
| 4 | Thatdao Nuekjang | 3 February 1994 | 1.83 m (6 ft 0 in) | 66 kg (146 lb) | 310 cm (10 ft 2 in) | 303 cm (9 ft 11 in) | (Thailand) Khonkaen Star |
| 5 | Pleumjit Thinkaow (C) | 9 November 1993 | 1.80 m (5 ft 11 in) | 63 kg (139 lb) | 302 cm (9 ft 11 in) | 290 cm (9 ft 6 in) | (Thailand) Bangkok Glass |
| 6 | Onuma Sittirak | 13 June 1990 | 1.75 m (5 ft 9 in) | 72 kg (159 lb) | 304 cm (10 ft 0 in) | 285 cm (9 ft 4 in) | (Japan) JT Marvelous |
| 7 | Hattaya Bamrungsuk | 12 August 1993 | 1.80 m (5 ft 11 in) | 70 kg (150 lb) | 300 cm (9 ft 10 in) | 282 cm (9 ft 3 in) | (Thailand) Nakhon Ratchasima |
| 8 | Yupa Sanitklang | 14 August 1991 | 1.66 m (5 ft 5 in) | 60 kg (130 lb) | 275 cm (9 ft 0 in) | 260 cm (8 ft 6 in) | (Thailand) Nakhon Ratchasima |
| 12 | Pimpichaya Kokram | 16 June 1998 | 1.77 m (5 ft 10 in) | 57 kg (126 lb) | 302 cm (9 ft 11 in) | 293 cm (9 ft 7 in) | (Thailand) 3BB Nakornnont |
| 13 | Nootsara Tomkom | 7 July 1989 | 1.69 m (5 ft 7 in) | 57 kg (126 lb) | 289 cm (9 ft 6 in) | 278 cm (9 ft 1 in) | (Turkey) Fenerbahçe |
| 15 | Malika Kanthong | 8 January 1991 | 1.77 m (5 ft 10 in) | 63 kg (139 lb) | 292 cm (9 ft 7 in) | 278 cm (9 ft 1 in) | (Azerbaijan) Azerrail Baku |
| 18 | Ajcharaporn Kongyot | 18 June 1995 | 1.80 m (5 ft 11 in) | 66 kg (146 lb) | 308 cm (10 ft 1 in) | 294 cm (9 ft 8 in) | (Thailand) Supreme |
| 19 | Chatchu-on Moksri | 6 November 1999 | 1.79 m (5 ft 10 in) | 63 kg (139 lb) | 303 cm (9 ft 11 in) | 298 cm (9 ft 9 in) | (Thailand) Nakhon Ratchasima |
