= 2017 Montreux Volley Masters squads =

This article shows the rosters of all participating teams at the 2017 Montreux Volley Masters in Switzerland.

== Pool A ==
=== Argentina ===
The following is the Argentine roster in the 2017 Montreux Volley Masters.

Head coach: Guillermo Orduna

| No. | Name | Date of birth | Height | Weight | Spike | Block | 2017 club |
|---|---|---|---|---|---|---|---|
| 1 | Priscila Bosio | 11 March 1994 | 1.82 m (6 ft 0 in) | 72 kg (159 lb) | 292 cm (115 in) | 275 cm (108 in) | (Argentina) GELP |
| 2 | Tanya Acosta | 11 March 1991 | 1.82 m (6 ft 0 in) | 70 kg (150 lb) | 287 cm (113 in) | 280 cm (110 in) | (Brazil) EC Pinheiros |
| 3 | Yamila Nizetich (C) | 27 January 1989 | 1.81 m (5 ft 11 in) | 74 kg (163 lb) | 305 cm (120 in) | 292 cm (115 in) | (Turkey) Seramiksan |
| 5 | Lucía Fresco | 14 May 1991 | 1.95 m (6 ft 5 in) | 92 kg (203 lb) | 304 cm (120 in) | 290 cm (110 in) | (Greece) Pannaxiakos |
| 6 | Elina Rodríguez | 11 February 1997 | 1.89 m (6 ft 2 in) | 72 kg (159 lb) | 300 cm (120 in) | 284 cm (112 in) | (Argentina) San Lorenzo |
| 7 | Natalia Aispurúa | 20 December 1991 | 1.92 m (6 ft 4 in) | 78 kg (172 lb) | 310 cm (120 in) | 293 cm (115 in) | (Argentina) Boca Juniors |
| 8 | Sol Piccolo | 11 September 1996 | 1.84 m (6 ft 0 in) | 74 kg (163 lb) | 294 cm (116 in) | 282 cm (111 in) | (Argentina) Vélez Sarsfield |
| 9 | Clarisa Sagardía | 29 June 1989 | 1.74 m (5 ft 9 in) | 67 kg (148 lb) | 290 cm (110 in) | 280 cm (110 in) | (Greece) Makedones Axios |
| 10 | Emilce Sosa | 11 September 1987 | 1.77 m (5 ft 10 in) | 72 kg (159 lb) | 305 cm (120 in) | 295 cm (116 in) | (Brazil) EC Pinheiros |
| 12 | Tatiana Rizzo | 30 December 1986 | 1.78 m (5 ft 10 in) | 64 kg (141 lb) | 280 cm (110 in) | 268 cm (106 in) | (Brazil) Rio do Sul |
| 14 | Florencia Giorgi | 10 October 1995 | 1.80 m (5 ft 11 in) | 65 kg (143 lb) | 290 cm (110 in) | 278 cm (109 in) | (Argentina) Unión Oncativo |
| 15 | Antonela Fortuna | 10 May 1995 | 1.75 m (5 ft 9 in) | 61 kg (134 lb) | 285 cm (112 in) | 275 cm (108 in) | (Argentina) Central San Carlos |
| 17 | Helena Vidal | 6 January 1989 | 1.86 m (6 ft 1 in) | 71 kg (157 lb) | 300 cm (120 in) | 293 cm (115 in) | (Italy) Pavia |
| 19 | Morena Franchi | 19 February 1993 | 1.64 m (5 ft 5 in) | 62 kg (137 lb) | 285 cm (112 in) | 264 cm (104 in) | (Poland) Budowlani Toruń |

=== China ===
The following is the Chinese roster in the 2017 Montreux Volley Masters.

Head coach: An Jiajie

| No. | Name | Date of birth | Height | Weight | Spike | Block | 2017 club |
|---|---|---|---|---|---|---|---|
| 2 | Qian Jingwen | 11 May 1998 | 1.86 m (6 ft 1 in) | 70 kg (150 lb) | 305 cm (120 in) | 297 cm (117 in) | (China) Shandong |
| 3 | Li Jing | 9 August 1991 | 1.86 m (6 ft 1 in) | 73 kg (161 lb) | 310 cm (120 in) | 295 cm (116 in) | (China) Zhejiang |
| 4 | Wang Huimin | 11 November 1992 | 1.84 m (6 ft 0 in) | 65 kg (143 lb) | 305 cm (120 in) | 298 cm (117 in) | (China) Zhejiang |
| 5 | Gao Yi | 22 July 1998 | 1.93 m (6 ft 4 in) | 66 kg (146 lb) | 304 cm (120 in) | 298 cm (117 in) | (China) Bayi |
| 6 | Gong Xiangyu | 21 April 1997 | 1.86 m (6 ft 1 in) | 72 kg (159 lb) | 313 cm (123 in) | 302 cm (119 in) | (China) Jiangsu |
| 7 | Diao Linyu | 7 April 1994 | 1.82 m (6 ft 0 in) | 69 kg (152 lb) | 309 cm (122 in) | 303 cm (119 in) | (China) Jiangsu |
| 9 | Yao Di | 15 August 1992 | 1.82 m (6 ft 0 in) | 65 kg (143 lb) | 306 cm (120 in) | 298 cm (117 in) | (China) Tianjin |
| 10 | Liu Xiaotong (C) | 16 February 1990 | 1.88 m (6 ft 2 in) | 80 kg (180 lb) | 312 cm (123 in) | 300 cm (120 in) | (China) Beijing |
| 12 | Zheng Yixin | 6 May 1995 | 1.87 m (6 ft 2 in) | 69 kg (152 lb) | 305 cm (120 in) | 300 cm (120 in) | (China) Fujian |
| 13 | Wang Chenyue | 22 August 1995 | 1.93 m (6 ft 4 in) | 75 kg (165 lb) | 305 cm (120 in) | 295 cm (116 in) | (China) Jiangsu |
| 15 | Lin Li | 5 July 1992 | 1.71 m (5 ft 7 in) | 65 kg (143 lb) | 294 cm (116 in) | 294 cm (116 in) | (China) Fujian |
| 17 | Wang Yuanyuan | 14 July 1997 | 1.95 m (6 ft 5 in) | 75 kg (165 lb) | 312 cm (123 in) | 300 cm (120 in) | (China) Tianjin |
| 18 | Wang Mengjie | 14 November 1995 | 1.72 m (5 ft 8 in) | 65 kg (143 lb) | 289 cm (114 in) | 280 cm (110 in) | (China) Shandong |
| 19 | Xu Ruoya | 1 March 1994 | 1.91 m (6 ft 3 in) | 91 kg (201 lb) | 307 cm (121 in) | 302 cm (119 in) | (China) Jiangsu |

=== Netherlands ===
The following is the Dutch roster in the 2017 Montreux Volley Masters.

Head coach: Jamie Morrison

| No. | Name | Date of birth | Height | Weight | Spike | Block | 2017 club |
|---|---|---|---|---|---|---|---|
| 1 | Kirsten Knip | 14 September 1992 | 1.75 m (5 ft 9 in) | 70 kg (150 lb) | 281 cm (111 in) | 275 cm (108 in) | (Germany) Ladies in Black Aachen |
| 2 | Femke Stoltenborg (C) | 30 July 1991 | 1.89 m (6 ft 2 in) | 81 kg (179 lb) | 303 cm (119 in) | 299 cm (118 in) | (Germany) Ladies in Black Aachen |
| 3 | Yvon Beliën | 28 December 1993 | 1.88 m (6 ft 2 in) | 73 kg (161 lb) | 307 cm (121 in) | 303 cm (119 in) | (Turkey) Bursa BB |
| 4 | Celeste Plak | 26 October 1995 | 1.90 m (6 ft 3 in) | 87 kg (192 lb) | 314 cm (124 in) | 302 cm (119 in) | (Italy) AGIL Novara |
| 7 | Jeanine Stoeten | 20 November 1991 | 1.95 m (6 ft 5 in) | 75 kg (165 lb) | 308 cm (121 in) | 301 cm (119 in) | (Germany) Ladies in Black Aachen |
| 12 | Britt Bongaerts | 3 November 1996 | 1.85 m (6 ft 1 in) | 68 kg (150 lb) | 296 cm (117 in) | 284 cm (112 in) | (Germany) USC Münster |
| 17 | Nicole Oude Luttikhuis | 26 December 1997 | 1.91 m (6 ft 3 in) | 74 kg (163 lb) | 298 cm (117 in) | 287 cm (113 in) | (Germany) Ladies in Black Aachen |
| 18 | Marrit Jasper | 28 February 1996 | 1.80 m (5 ft 11 in) | 75 kg (165 lb) | 300 cm (120 in) | 285 cm (112 in) | (Germany) VfB Suhl |
| 19 | Nika Daalderop | 29 November 1998 | 1.89 m (6 ft 2 in) | 72 kg (159 lb) | 317 cm (125 in) | 308 cm (121 in) | (Germany) Ladies in Black Aachen |
| 20 | Tessa Polder | 10 October 1997 | 1.89 m (6 ft 2 in) | 76 kg (168 lb) | 301 cm (119 in) | 293 cm (115 in) | (Germany) Ladies in Black Aachen |
| 22 | Nicole Koolhaas | 31 January 1991 | 1.98 m (6 ft 6 in) | 77 kg (170 lb) | 310 cm (120 in) | 300 cm (120 in) | (Romania) CSM București |
| 26 | Dagmar Boom | 1 May 2000 | 1.81 m (5 ft 11 in) | 69 kg (152 lb) | 296 cm (117 in) | 291 cm (115 in) | (Netherlands) Talent Team Papendal/Arnhem |

=== Switzerland ===
The following is the Swiss roster in the 2017 Montreux Volley Masters.

Head coach: Timo Lippuner

| No. | Name | Date of birth | Height | Weight | Spike | Block | 2017 club |
|---|---|---|---|---|---|---|---|
| 2 | Linda Kronenberg | 6 October 1990 | 1.72 m (5 ft 8 in) | 65 kg (143 lb) | 290 cm (110 in) | 280 cm (110 in) | (Switzerland) VFM Franches-Montagnes |
| 5 | Martina Halter | 9 May 1994 | 1.92 m (6 ft 4 in) | 78 kg (172 lb) | 300 cm (120 in) | 278 cm (109 in) | (Switzerland) Viteos NUC |
| 6 | Madlaina Matter | 19 October 1996 | 1.84 m (6 ft 0 in) | 61 kg (134 lb) | 309 cm (122 in) | 290 cm (110 in) | (Switzerland) Sm'Aesch Pfeffingen |
| 8 | Maja Storck | 8 October 1998 | 1.84 m (6 ft 0 in) | 72 kg (159 lb) | 310 cm (120 in) | 298 cm (117 in) | (Switzerland) Sm'Aesch Pfeffingen |
| 9 | Tabea Dalliard | 18 July 1994 | 1.69 m (5 ft 7 in) | 63 kg (139 lb) | 274 cm (108 in) | 265 cm (104 in) | (Switzerland) Viteos NUC |
| 11 | Sarah Trösch | 28 September 1994 | 1.76 m (5 ft 9 in) | 70 kg (150 lb) | 280 cm (110 in) | 270 cm (110 in) | (Switzerland) Volley Top Luzern |
| 12 | Julie Lengweiler | 6 November 1998 | 1.88 m (6 ft 2 in) | 69 kg (152 lb) | 305 cm (120 in) | 300 cm (120 in) | (Switzerland) Voléro Zürich |
| 13 | Elise Boillat | 30 April 1998 | 1.78 m (5 ft 10 in) | 64 kg (141 lb) | 293 cm (115 in) | 280 cm (110 in) | (Switzerland) Kanti Schaffhouse |
| 14 | Laura Künzler (C) | 25 December 1996 | 1.89 m (6 ft 2 in) | 69 kg (152 lb) | 298 cm (117 in) | 287 cm (113 in) | (Switzerland) Sm'Aesch Pfeffingen |
| 17 | Méline Pierret | 18 January 1999 | 1.75 m (5 ft 9 in) | 61 kg (134 lb) | 287 cm (113 in) | 275 cm (108 in) | (Switzerland) VBC Fribourg |
| 19 | Thays Deprati | 14 April 1992 | 1.72 m (5 ft 8 in) | 65 kg (143 lb) | 266 cm (105 in) | 253 cm (100 in) | (Switzerland) Sm'Aesch Pfeffingen |
| 20 | Alexandra Lorenz | 4 July 1999 | 1.70 m (5 ft 7 in) | 54 kg (119 lb) | 262 cm (103 in) | 207 cm (81 in) | (Switzerland) Sm'Aesch Pfeffingen |
| 21 | Francine Marx | 18 April 1998 | 1.84 m (6 ft 0 in) | 74 kg (163 lb) | 289 cm (114 in) | 275 cm (108 in) | (Switzerland) VBC Fribourg |
| 22 | Samira Sulser | 22 December 1995 | 1.87 m (6 ft 2 in) | 70 kg (150 lb) | 0 cm (0 in) | 305 cm (120 in) | (Switzerland) Sm'Aesch Pfeffingen |

== Pool B ==
=== Brazil ===
The following is the Brazilian roster in the 2017 Montreux Volley Masters.

Head coach: José Roberto Guimarães

| No. | Name | Date of birth | Height | Weight | Spike | Block | 2017 club |
|---|---|---|---|---|---|---|---|
| 1 | Mara Leão | 26 July 1991 | 1.88 m (6 ft 2 in) | 77 kg (170 lb) | 310 cm (120 in) | 297 cm (117 in) | (Brazil) Minas TC |
| 3 | Naiane Rios | 29 November 1994 | 1.79 m (5 ft 10 in) | 63 kg (139 lb) | 276 cm (109 in) | 281 cm (111 in) | (Brazil) Minas TC |
| 4 | Ana Carolina da Silva | 8 April 1991 | 1.83 m (6 ft 0 in) | 73 kg (161 lb) | 290 cm (110 in) | 290 cm (110 in) | (Brazil) Rexona-Sesc |
| 5 | Adenízia da Silva | 18 December 1986 | 1.85 m (6 ft 1 in) | 63 kg (139 lb) | 312 cm (123 in) | 290 cm (110 in) | (Italy) Scandicci |
| 6 | Edinara Brancher | 1 February 1996 | 1.86 m (6 ft 1 in) | 80 kg (180 lb) | 295 cm (116 in) | 285 cm (112 in) | (Brazil) São Caetano |
| 7 | Rosamaria Montibeller | 9 April 1994 | 1.85 m (6 ft 1 in) | 76 kg (168 lb) | 291 cm (115 in) | 285 cm (112 in) | (Brazil) Minas TC |
| 8 | Fernanda Tomé | 10 December 1989 | 1.95 m (6 ft 5 in) | 78 kg (172 lb) | 295 cm (116 in) | 291 cm (115 in) | (Brazil) São Caetano |
| 9 | Roberta Ratzke | 28 April 1990 | 1.85 m (6 ft 1 in) | 71 kg (157 lb) | 287 cm (113 in) | 278 cm (109 in) | (Brazil) Rexona-Sesc |
| 11 | Tandara Caixeta | 30 October 1988 | 1.84 m (6 ft 0 in) | 87 kg (192 lb) | 305 cm (120 in) | 297 cm (117 in) | (Brazil) Vôlei Nestlé |
| 12 | Natália Pereira (C) | 4 April 1989 | 1.83 m (6 ft 0 in) | 76 kg (168 lb) | 300 cm (120 in) | 288 cm (113 in) | (Turkey) Fenerbahçe |
| 13 | Amanda Francisco | 16 August 1988 | 1.80 m (5 ft 11 in) | 62 kg (137 lb) | 304 cm (120 in) | 286 cm (113 in) | (Brazil) Brasília Vôlei |
| 14 | Gabriella Souza | 14 December 1993 | 1.75 m (5 ft 9 in) | 69 kg (152 lb) | 296 cm (117 in) | 273 cm (107 in) | (Brazil) Vôlei Nestlé |
| 16 | Drussyla Costa | 1 July 1996 | 1.82 m (6 ft 0 in) | 73 kg (161 lb) | 304 cm (120 in) | 286 cm (113 in) | (Brazil) Rexona-Sesc |
| 17 | Suelen Pinto | 4 October 1987 | 1.66 m (5 ft 5 in) | 81 kg (179 lb) | 256 cm (101 in) | 238 cm (94 in) | (Italy) Foppapedretti Bergamo |

=== Germany ===
The following is the German roster in the 2017 Montreux Volley Masters.

Head coach: Felix Koslowski

| No. | Name | Date of birth | Height | Weight | Spike | Block | 2017 club |
|---|---|---|---|---|---|---|---|
| 1 | Lenka Dürr | 10 December 1990 | 1.71 m (5 ft 7 in) | 59 kg (130 lb) | 280 cm (110 in) | 270 cm (110 in) | (Germany) Schweriner SC |
| 2 | Irina Kemmsies | 14 May 1996 | 1.81 m (5 ft 11 in) | 65 kg (143 lb) | 299 cm (118 in) | 286 cm (113 in) | (Germany) VC Wiesbaden |
| 4 | Maren Brinker (C) | 10 July 1986 | 1.84 m (6 ft 0 in) | 68 kg (150 lb) | 303 cm (119 in) | 295 cm (116 in) | (Germany) Schweriner SC |
| 6 | Jennifer Geerties | 5 April 1994 | 1.84 m (6 ft 0 in) | 58 kg (128 lb) | 298 cm (117 in) | 288 cm (113 in) | (Germany) Schweriner SC |
| 10 | Lena Stigrot | 20 December 1994 | 1.84 m (6 ft 0 in) | 68 kg (150 lb) | 303 cm (119 in) | 295 cm (116 in) | (Germany) Rote Raben Vilsbiburg |
| 11 | Louisa Lippmann | 23 September 1994 | 1.91 m (6 ft 3 in) | 78 kg (172 lb) | 319 cm (126 in) | 312 cm (123 in) | (Germany) Schweriner SC |
| 14 | Marie Schölzel | 1 August 1997 | 1.88 m (6 ft 2 in) | 66 kg (146 lb) | 307 cm (121 in) | 299 cm (118 in) | (Germany) Schweriner SC |
| 15 | Lena Möllers | 6 January 1990 | 1.88 m (6 ft 2 in) | 74 kg (163 lb) | 312 cm (123 in) | 297 cm (117 in) | (France) Béziers Volley |
| 16 | Juliane Langgemach | 6 November 1994 | 1.88 m (6 ft 2 in) | 73 kg (161 lb) | 295 cm (116 in) | 285 cm (112 in) | (Germany) USC Münster |
| 17 | Anna Pogany | 21 July 1994 | 1.68 m (5 ft 6 in) | 70 kg (150 lb) | 280 cm (110 in) | 270 cm (110 in) | (Germany) Köpenicker SC |
| 18 | Dora Grozer | 21 November 1995 | 1.82 m (6 ft 0 in) | 65 kg (143 lb) | 302 cm (119 in) | 297 cm (117 in) | (Germany) VC Wiesbaden |
| 19 | Tanja Großer | 27 November 1993 | 1.77 m (5 ft 10 in) | 60 kg (130 lb) | 296 cm (117 in) | 286 cm (113 in) | (Germany) VC Wiesbaden |
| 20 | Leonie Schwertmann | 12 January 1994 | 1.90 m (6 ft 3 in) | 80 kg (180 lb) | 300 cm (120 in) | 290 cm (110 in) | (Germany) USC Münster |
| 21 | Barbara Roxana Wezorke | 12 April 1993 | 1.85 m (6 ft 1 in) | 75 kg (165 lb) | 305 cm (120 in) | 290 cm (110 in) | (Germany) Dresdner SC |

=== Poland ===
The following is the Polish roster in the 2017 Montreux Volley Masters.

Head coach: Jacek Nawrocki

| No. | Name | Date of birth | Height | Weight | Spike | Block | 2017 club |
|---|---|---|---|---|---|---|---|
| 3 | Klaudia Alagierska | 2 January 1996 | 1.90 m (6 ft 3 in) | 76 kg (168 lb) | 297 cm (117 in) | 290 cm (110 in) | (Poland) Legionovia Legionowo |
| 4 | Patrycja Polak | 23 February 1991 | 1.83 m (6 ft 0 in) | 62 kg (137 lb) | 301 cm (119 in) | 279 cm (110 in) | (Poland) Budowlani Toruń |
| 5 | Agnieszka Kąkolewska | 17 October 1994 | 1.97 m (6 ft 6 in) | 75 kg (165 lb) | 309 cm (122 in) | 295 cm (116 in) | (Poland) Impel Wrocław |
| 9 | Aleksandra Krzos | 23 June 1989 | 1.81 m (5 ft 11 in) | 71 kg (157 lb) | 275 cm (108 in) | 260 cm (100 in) | (Poland) Chemik Police |
| 10 | Zuzanna Efimienko | 8 August 1989 | 1.97 m (6 ft 6 in) | 72 kg (159 lb) | 318 cm (125 in) | 303 cm (119 in) | (Poland) ŁKS Łódź |
| 12 | Monika Bociek | 6 April 1996 | 1.85 m (6 ft 1 in) | 70 kg (150 lb) | 302 cm (119 in) | 287 cm (113 in) | (Poland) MKS Muszyna |
| 13 | Agata Witkowska | 19 August 1989 | 1.70 m (5 ft 7 in) | 63 kg (139 lb) | 280 cm (110 in) | 275 cm (108 in) | (Poland) Budowlani Łódź |
| 14 | Joanna Wołosz (C) | 7 April 1990 | 1.81 m (5 ft 11 in) | 65 kg (143 lb) | 303 cm (119 in) | 281 cm (111 in) | (Italy) Imoco Conegliano |
| 15 | Martyna Grajber | 28 March 1995 | 1.80 m (5 ft 11 in) | 67 kg (148 lb) | 293 cm (115 in) | 276 cm (109 in) | (Poland) Budowlani Łódź |
| 16 | Natalia Mędrzyk | 13 January 1992 | 1.83 m (6 ft 0 in) | 73 kg (161 lb) | 305 cm (120 in) | 287 cm (113 in) | (Poland) Impel Wrocław |
| 17 | Malwina Smarzek | 3 June 1996 | 1.91 m (6 ft 3 in) | 80 kg (180 lb) | 318 cm (125 in) | 292 cm (115 in) | (Poland) Chemik Police |
| 20 | Marlena Pleśnierowicz | 9 January 1992 | 1.76 m (5 ft 9 in) | 61 kg (134 lb) | 295 cm (116 in) | 281 cm (111 in) | (Poland) Pałac Bydgoszcz |
| 22 | Roksana Brzóska | 2 September 1993 | 1.80 m (5 ft 11 in) | 75 kg (165 lb) | 300 cm (120 in) | 289 cm (114 in) | (Poland) MKS Muszyna |
| 25 | Małgorzata Jasek | 14 March 1995 | 1.91 m (6 ft 3 in) | 78 kg (172 lb) | 300 cm (120 in) | 240 cm (94 in) | (Poland) AZS-AWF Warszawa |

=== Thailand ===
The following is the Thai roster in the 2017 Montreux Volley Masters.

Head coach: Danai Sriwatcharamethakul

| No. | Name | Date of birth | Height | Weight | Spike | Block | 2017 club |
|---|---|---|---|---|---|---|---|
| 2 | Piyanut Pannoy | 10 November 1989 | 1.71 m (5 ft 7 in) | 62 kg (137 lb) | 280 cm (110 in) | 275 cm (108 in) | (Thailand) Supreme Chonburi |
| 3 | Pornpun Guedpard | 5 May 1993 | 1.70 m (5 ft 7 in) | 63 kg (139 lb) | 288 cm (113 in) | 279 cm (110 in) | (Thailand) Bangkok Glass |
| 4 | Thatdao Nuekjang | 3 February 1994 | 1.84 m (6 ft 0 in) | 72 kg (159 lb) | 308 cm (121 in) | 296 cm (117 in) | (Thailand) Khonkaen Star |
| 5 | Pleumjit Thinkaow (C) | 9 November 1993 | 1.80 m (5 ft 11 in) | 67 kg (148 lb) | 303 cm (119 in) | 283 cm (111 in) | (Thailand) Bangkok Glass |
| 7 | Hattaya Bamrungsuk | 12 August 1993 | 1.80 m (5 ft 11 in) | 71 kg (157 lb) | 292 cm (115 in) | 282 cm (111 in) | (Thailand) Nakhon Ratchasima The Mall |
| 8 | Yupa Sanitklang | 14 August 1991 | 1.66 m (5 ft 5 in) | 55 kg (121 lb) | 275 cm (108 in) | 260 cm (100 in) | (Thailand) Nakhon Ratchasima The Mall |
| 9 | Jarasporn Bundasak | 1 March 1993 | 1.81 m (5 ft 11 in) | 65 kg (143 lb) | 291 cm (115 in) | 283 cm (111 in) | (Thailand) Bangkok Glass |
| 10 | Wilavan Apinyapong | 6 June 1988 | 1.74 m (5 ft 9 in) | 70 kg (150 lb) | 294 cm (116 in) | 282 cm (111 in) | (Thailand) Supreme Chonburi |
| 11 | Soraya Phomla | 6 August 1992 | 1.69 m (5 ft 7 in) | 60 kg (130 lb) | 280 cm (110 in) | 270 cm (110 in) | (Thailand) Supreme Chonburi |
| 12 | Tapaphaipun Chaisri | 29 November 1989 | 1.68 m (5 ft 6 in) | 70 kg (150 lb) | 295 cm (116 in) | 276 cm (109 in) | (Thailand) Thai-Denmark Nongrua |
| 16 | Pimpichaya Kokram | 16 June 1998 | 1.78 m (5 ft 10 in) | 62 kg (137 lb) | 293 cm (115 in) | 283 cm (111 in) | (Thailand) 3BB Nakornnont |
| 17 | Tichaya Boonlert | 14 February 1997 | 1.79 m (5 ft 10 in) | 64 kg (141 lb) | 293 cm (115 in) | 284 cm (112 in) | (Thailand) 3BB Nakornnont |
| 18 | Ajcharaporn Kongyot | 18 June 1995 | 1.78 m (5 ft 10 in) | 65 kg (143 lb) | 298 cm (117 in) | 287 cm (113 in) | (Thailand) Supreme Chonburi |
| 19 | Chatchu-on Moksri | 6 November 1999 | 1.78 m (5 ft 10 in) | 58 kg (128 lb) | 298 cm (117 in) | 290 cm (110 in) | (Thailand) Nakhon Ratchasima The Mall |
