= Wang Mengjie =

Chinese volleyball player (born 1995)

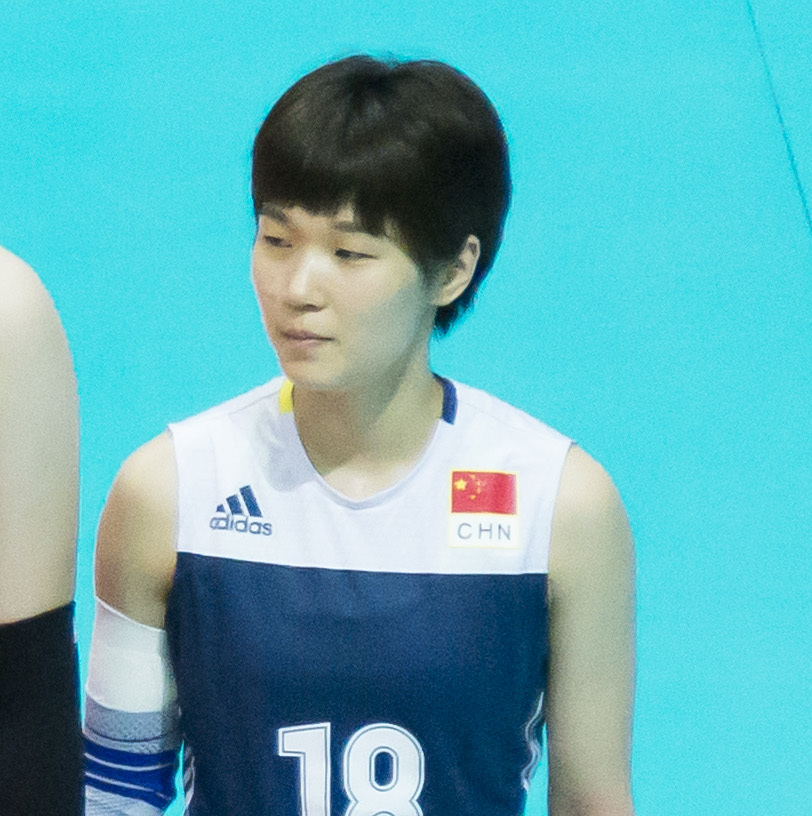
- 2017

Personal information
- Nationality: Chinese
- Born: 14 November 1995 (age 30) Jinan, Shandong, China
- Height: 1.72 m (5 ft 8 in)
- Weight: 65 kg (143 lb)
- Spike: 289 cm (114 in)
- Block: 280 cm (110 in)

Volleyball information
- Position: Libero
- Current club: (United States) San Francisco Signal
- Number: 18 (NT) 10 (Club)

National team
- Years: Team
- 2015 – present: China
Honours
Representing China
World Championship
Bronze medal – third place	2018 Japan	Team
World Cup
Gold medal – first place	2019 Japan	Team
Gold medal – first place	2015 Japan	Team
World Grand Champions Cup
Gold medal – first place	2017 Japan	Team
Volleyball Nations League
Silver medal – second place	2023 Arlington	Team
Bronze medal – third place	2018 Nanjing	Team
Asian Games
Gold medal – first place	2018 Jakarta-Palembang
Gold medal – first place	2022 Hangzhou	Team
Montreux Volley Masters
Gold medal – first place	2016 Switzerland
Bronze medal – third place	2017 Switzerland	Team

Wang Mengjie (Chinese: 王梦洁; pinyin: Wang Mengjie; born 14 November 1995) is a Chinese volleyball player. She is part of the China women's national volleyball team. On club level she played for Shandong in 2015.

She was part of the China team in 2017 who took part in the FIVB Volleyball World Grand Prix in Macao. The team who included Zhu Ting, Qian Jingwen, Zheng Yixin, Wang Yunlu played against the USA, Turkey and Italy. The final part of the competition was in Nanjing in China where the team came fourth.

== Awards ==
=== Individuals ===
- 2026 AVC Continental Championship – "Best libero"

== Clubs ==
- (China) Shandong (2013–2016)
- (China) Sichuan (2016–2017) (loaned)
- (China) Beijing BAIC Moto (2017–2019) (loaned)
- (China) Zhejiang (2018) (loaned)
- (China) Shandong Rizhao Steel (2019–2024
- (China) Beijing BAIC Moto (2024–2025)
- (China) Shandong Rizhao Steel (2025–2026)
- (United States) San Francisco Signal (2027)

Awards
Preceded by (Netherlands) Janneke van Tienen	Best Libero of Montreux Volley Masters; 2013	Succeeded by (Germany) Lenka Dürr
Preceded by (Dominican Republic) Brenda Castillo	Best Libero of FIVB World Cup; 2019	Succeeded by Incumbent
