= Lena Stigrot =

German volleyball player (born 1994)

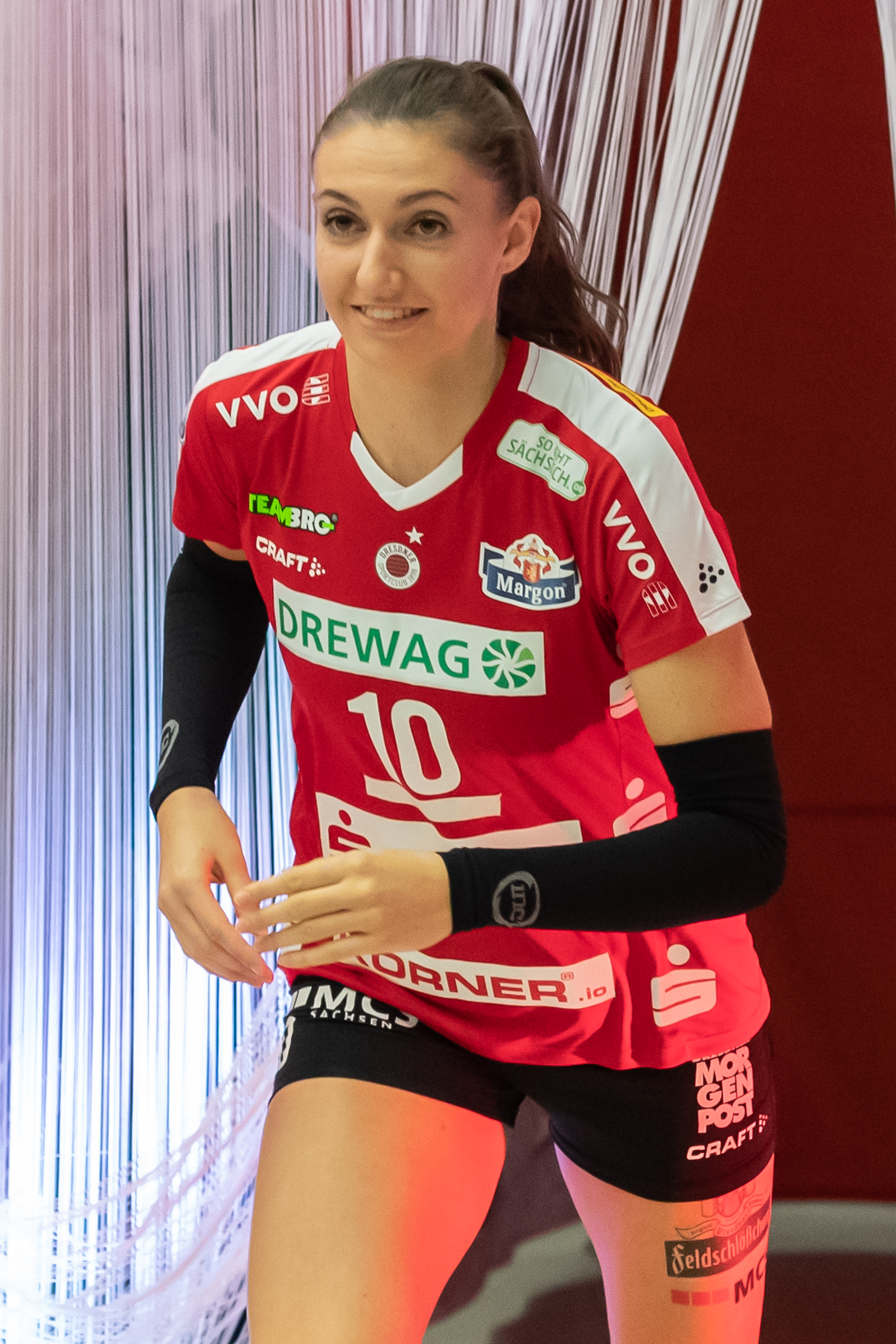
- Lena Stigrot (2019)

Personal information
- Nationality: German
- Born: 21 December 1994 (age 31); Bad Tölz, Germany
- Height: 184 cm (72 in)
- Weight: 68 kg (150 lb)
- Spike: 311 cm (122 in)
- Block: 295 cm (116 in)

Volleyball information
- Position: Outside-spiker
- Number: 10 (national team)

Career
Years	Teams
2015	Raben Vilsbiburg

National team
2015	Germany
Honours
Representing Germany
Montreux Volley Masters
Silver medal – second place	2017 Switzerland	Team

Lena Stigrot (born 21 December 1994) is a German volleyball player, playing as an outside-spiker. She is part of the Germany women's national volleyball team.

She competed at the 2015 FIVB Volleyball World Grand Prix, and at the 2015 European Games, 2015 Women's European Volleyball Championship. and 2019 Montreux Volley Masters. On club level she plays for Raben Vilsbiburg.
