= Ségolène =

French-language name

Ségolène, also Sigolène or Sigolina, is a French name, now solely feminine but previously, in the forms Ségolène, Sigolin or Sigolinus, also occasionally masculine. It is derived from a diminutive of Siga, a mediaeval hypocoristic (diminutive form) of Germanic names having the first element Sig- (meaning "victory"). The rarer masculine form of the name was derived in the same way from the masculine hypocoristic Sigo. An alternative explanation of the feminine name is that it is the equivalent of the German name Sieglinde. The form of the name was apparently influenced by the similar Gaulish element Sego- ("victory" or "strength").

== People ==
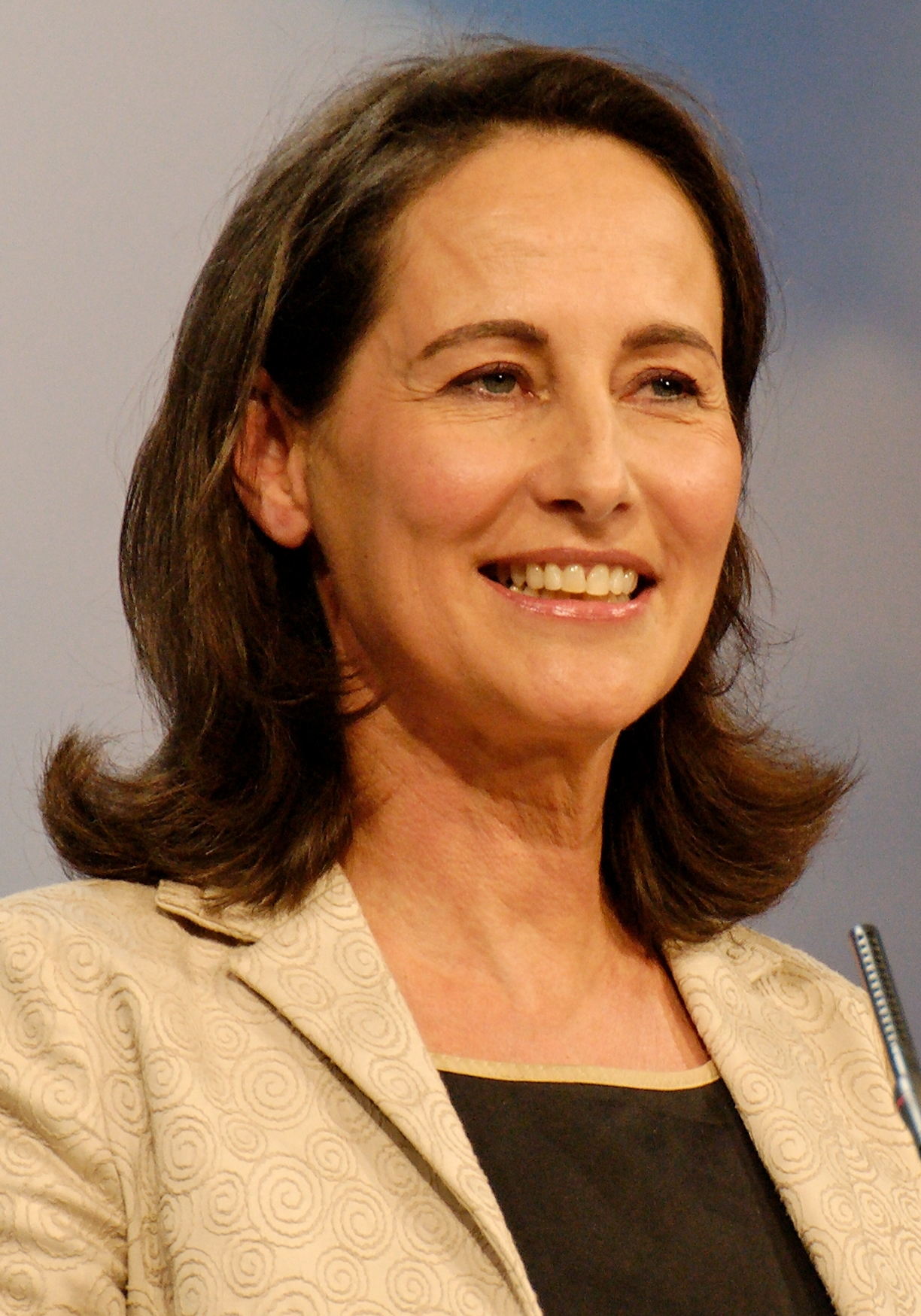
French politician and former Presidential candidate Ségolène Royal

=== Female ===
- Saint Segolena of Troclar otherwise Sigolena of Albi (7th century), French abbess and saint
- Ségolène Amiot (born 1986), French politician
- Ségolène Berger (born 1978), French tennis player
- Ségolène Girard (born 1995), Swiss volleyball player
- Ségolène Lefebvre (born 1993), French boxer
- Ségolène Royal (born 1953), French politician, partner of François Hollande
- Sigolène Vinson (born 1974), French writer and journalist, survivor of the Charlie Hebdo killings

=== Male ===
- Saint Sigolin of Stavelot (7th century), abbot of Stavelot Abbey

== Places ==
- Sainte-Sigolène, commune in the Haute-Loire department, France
