= Lena Möllers =

German volleyball player (born 1990)

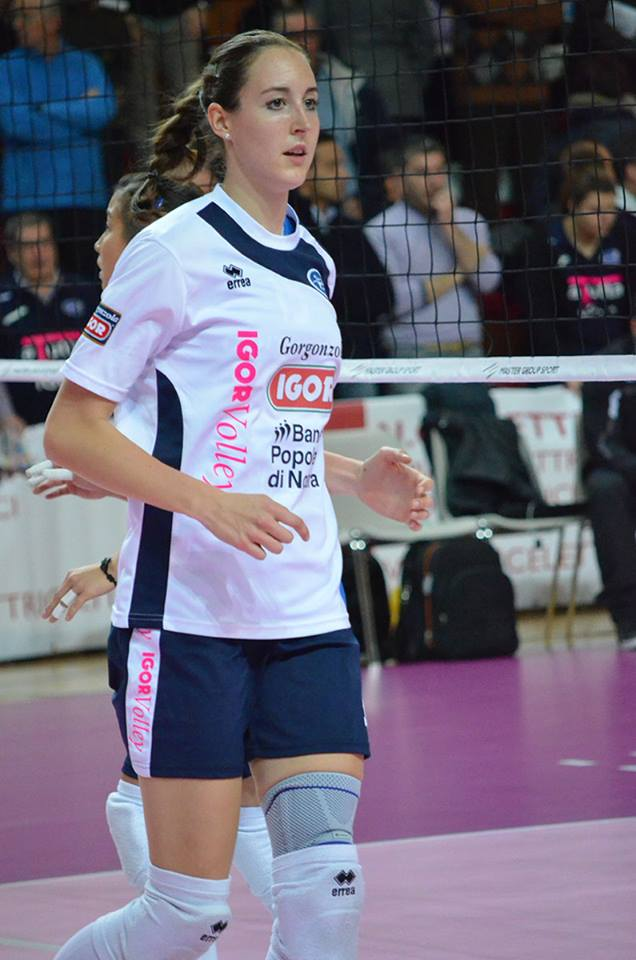

Personal information
- Nationality: German
- Born: 6 January 1990 (age 36)
- Height: 1.88 m (6 ft 2 in)
- Weight: 78 kg (172 lb)
- Spike: 312 cm (123 in)
- Block: 297 cm (117 in)

Volleyball information
- Position: Spiker
- Current club: (France) Béziers Volley
- Number: 5

Career
Years	Teams
2010	(Germany) Rote Raben Vilsiburg

National team
2010–	Germany
Honours
Women's volleyball
Representing Germany
Montreux Volley Masters
Silver medal – second place	2017 Switzerland	Team

Lena Mollers (born 6 January 1990) is a German female volleyball player. She is part of the Germany women's national volleyball team.

She participated in the 2010 FIVB Volleyball Women's World Championship. She played with Rote Raben Vilsiburg.

== Clubs ==
- (Germany) Rote Raben Vilsiburg (2010)

== Awards ==
=== Clubs ===
- 2017–18 CEV Champions League - Runner-Up, with CSM Volei Alba Blaj
