= Leonie Schwertmann =

German volleyball player (born 1994)

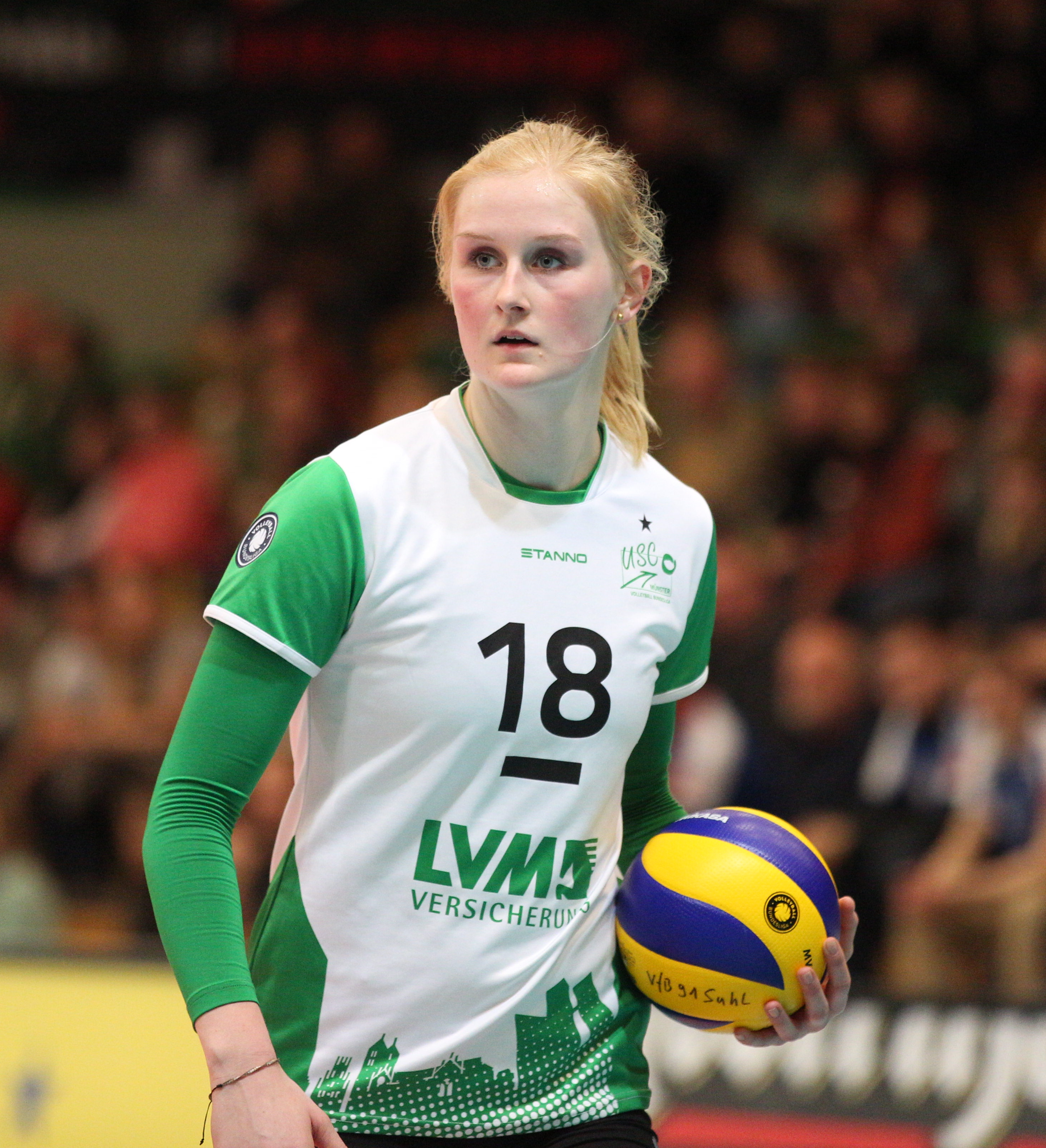
- Schwertmann with USC Münster in 2017

Personal information
- Nationality: German
- Born: 12 February 1994 (age 32)
- Height: 1.90 m (75 in)
- Weight: 80 kg (176 lb)
- Spike: 314 cm (124 in)
- Block: 307 cm (121 in)

Volleyball information
- Position: Middle-blocker
- Number: 9 (national team)

Career
| Years | Teams |
|---|---|
| 2015 | USC Münster |

National team
| 2015 | Germany |
Honours
Representing Germany
Montreux Volley Masters
| Silver medal – second place | 2017 Switzerland | Team |

Leonie Schwertmann (born 12 February 1994) is a German female volleyball player, playing as a middle-blocker. She is part of the Germany women's national volleyball team.

She competed at the 2015 European Games in Baku. At club level she played for USC Münster in 2015. She participated in the 2016 FIVB Volleyball World Grand Prix.
