= Laura Sirucek =

Swiss volleyball player (born 1990)

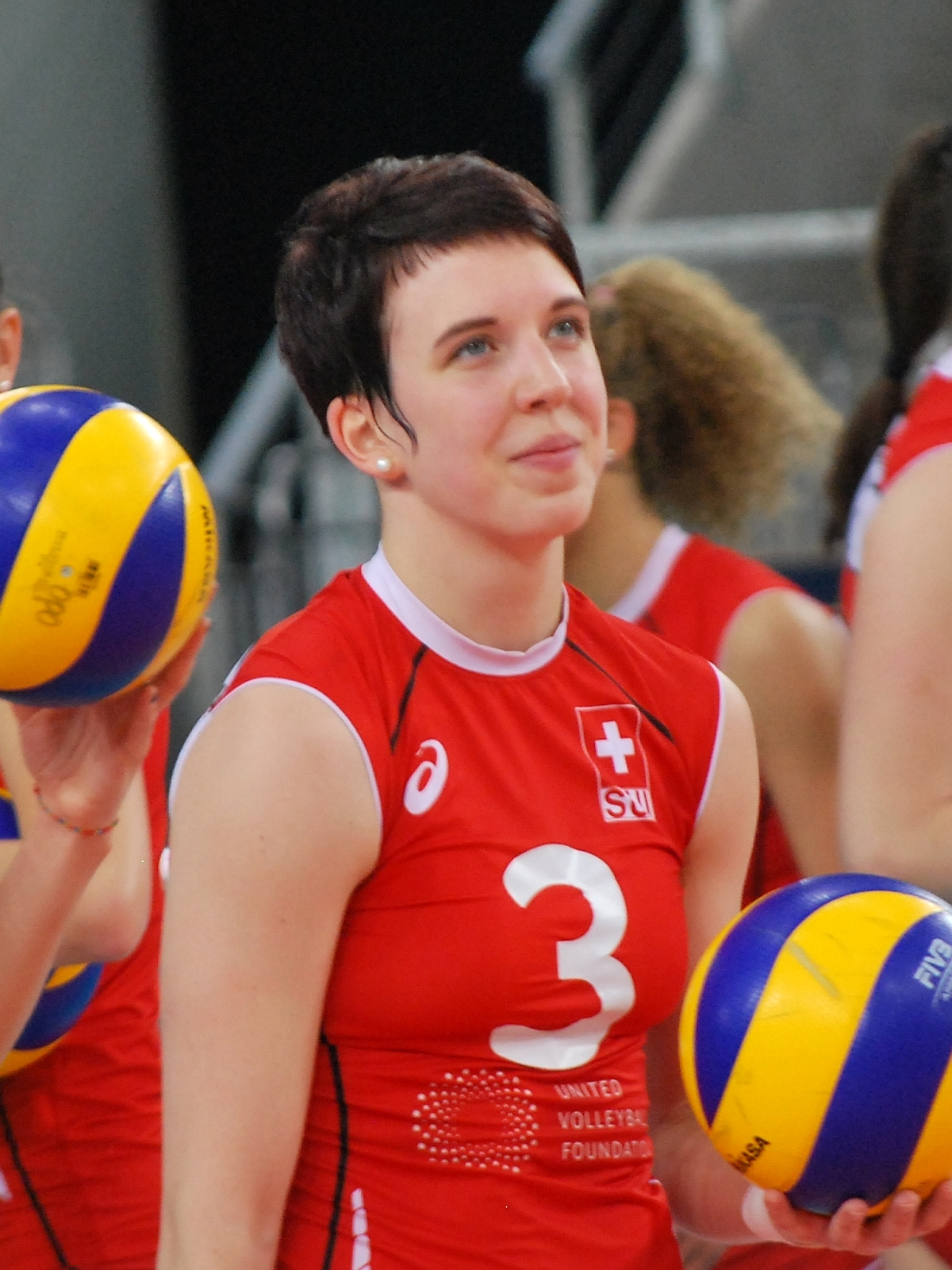
- A portrait of Laura Sirucek

Personal information
- Nationality: Swiss
- Born: 5 April 1990 (age 36)
- Height: 177 cm (70 in)
- Weight: 70 kg (154 lb)

Volleyball information
- Position: right side hitter
- Number: 3 (national team)

Career
Years	Teams
2013	(Switzerland) Kanti Sciaffusa

National team
2013	Switzerland

Laura Sirucek (born 5 April 1990) is a Swiss female former volleyball player, playing as a right side hitter. She was part of the Switzerland women's national volleyball team.

She competed at the 2013 Women's European Volleyball Championship. On club level she played for Kanti Sciaffusa.
