= Florencia Giorgi =

Argentine volleyball player (born 1995)

Personal information
- Nationality: Argentine
- Born: 10 October 1995 (age 31)
- Height: 180 cm (71 in)
- Weight: 65 kg (143 lb)
- Spike: 290 cm (114 in)
- Block: 278 cm (109 in)

Volleyball information
- Number: 14 (national team)

Career
Years	Teams
2011	Union Oncativo

National team
2011-	Argentina

Florencia Giorgi (born 10 October 1995) is an Argentine volleyball player. She is part of the Argentina women's national volleyball team.

She participated in the 2011 FIVB Volleyball Girls' U18 World Championship, 2017 FIVB Volleyball World Grand Prix, and 2017 Montreux Volley Masters. At club level she played for Union Oncativo in 2017.
