= Xu Ruoya =

Chinese volleyball player (born 1994)

Personal information
- Nationality: Chinese
- Born: 1 March 1994 (age 32)
- Height: 191 cm (75 in)
- Weight: 91 kg (201 lb)
- Spike: 307 cm (121 in)
- Block: 302 cm (119 in)

Volleyball information
- Position: Wing spiker

Career
- Years: Team
- 2011 - present: Jiangsu

National team
- Years: Team
- 2011 - present: China

Xu Ruoya (born 1 March 1994) is a Chinese female volleyball player. She is part of the China women's national volleyball team.

She participated in the 2011 FIVB Volleyball Girls' U18 World Championship, the 2017 Montreux Volley Masters. On club level she played for Shandong in 2017.
