= 1967 Women's European Volleyball Championship =

Tournament details
- Host country: Turkey
- Dates: 26 October – 8 November
- Teams: 15
- Venue: Various (in 4 host cities)

Final positions
- Champions: Soviet Union (6th title)

The 1967 Women's European Volleyball Championship was the seventh edition of the event, organised by Europe's governing volleyball body, the Confédération Européenne de Volleyball. It was hosted in several cities in Turkey from 22 October to 8 November 1967, with the final round held in İzmir.

== Participating teams ==
- Belgium
- Bulgaria
- Czechoslovakia
- East Germany
- Hungary
- Israel
- Italy
- Netherlands
- Poland
- Romania
- Soviet Union
- Sweden
- Switzerland
- Turkey
- West Germany

== Format ==
The tournament was played in two different stages. In the first stage, the fifteen participants were divided into four groups (three groups of four teams and one group of three teams). In the second stage, two groups were formed, one containing the winners and runners-up from all first stage groups (eight teams in total) to contest the tournament title. A second group was formed by the remaining seven teams which played for position places (9th to 15th). All groups in both stages played a single round-robin format.

== Pools composition ==
Pool A	Pool B	Pool C	Pool D
East Germany	Bulgaria	Belgium	Netherlands
Hungary	Israel	Czechoslovakia	Soviet Union
Italy	Sweden	Poland	Switzerland
Romania	Turkey	West Germany	Switzerland

== Venues ==
Pool A and 9th–15th pool	Pool B	Tournament host cities
Ankara	Istanbul	Tournament host cities
Pool C	Pool D and Final pool	Tournament host cities
Adana	İzmir	Tournament host cities

== Preliminary round ==
=== Pool A ===
- venue location: Ankara, Turkey

Pos	Team	Pld	W	L	Pts	SW	SL	SR	SPW	SPL	SPR	Qualification
1	East Germany	3	2	1	5	6	3	2.000	126	88	1.432	Final pool
2	Hungary	3	2	1	5	6	3	2.000	115	91	1.264	Final pool
3	Romania	3	2	1	5	6	3	2.000	119	103	1.155	9th–15th pool
4	Italy	3	0	3	3	0	0	—	57	135	0.422	9th–15th pool

Date		Score		Set 1	Set 2	Set 3	Set 4	Set 5	Total	Report
26 Oct	East Germany	3–0	Hungary	15–12	15–8	15–5			45–25	Report
26 Oct	Romania	3–0	Italy	15–8	15–7	15–7			45–22	Report
27 Oct	Hungary	3–0	Romania	15–12	15–10	15–6			45–28	Report
27 Oct	East Germany	3–0	Italy	15–13	15–1	15–3			45–17	Report
28 Oct	Hungary	3–0	Italy	15–9	15–2	15–7			45–18	Report
28 Oct	Romania	3–0	East Germany	16–14	15–13	15–9			46–36	Report

=== Pool B ===
- venue location: Istanbul, Turkey

Pos	Team	Pld	W	L	Pts	SW	SL	SR	SPW	SPL	SPR	Qualification
1	Bulgaria	3	3	0	6	9	0	MAX	135	32	4.219	Final pool
2	Israel	3	2	1	5	6	4	1.500	107	102	1.049	Final pool
3	Turkey	3	1	2	4	4	6	0.667	107	126	0.849	9th–15th pool
4	Sweden	3	0	3	3	0	9	0.000	46	135	0.341	9th–15th pool

Date		Score		Set 1	Set 2	Set 3	Set 4	Set 5	Total	Report
26 Oct	Turkey	3–0	Sweden	15–7	15–10	15–9			45–26	Report
26 Oct	Bulgaria	3–0	Israel	15–0	15–1	15–6			45–7	Report
27 Oct	Bulgaria	3–0	Turkey	15–3	15–5	15–8			45–16	Report
27 Oct	Israel	3–0	Sweden	15–1	15–8	15–2			45–11	Report
28 Oct	Israel	3–1	Turkey	15–11	15–12	10–15	15–8		55–46	Report
28 Oct	Bulgaria	3–0	Sweden	15–2	15–3	15–4			45–9	Report

=== Pool C ===
- venue location: Adana, Turkey

Pos	Team	Pld	W	L	Pts	SW	SL	SR	SPW	SPL	SPR	Qualification
1	Poland	3	3	0	6	9	2	4.500	150	66	2.273	Final pool
2	Czechoslovakia	3	2	1	5	8	3	2.667	145	70	2.071	Final pool
3	West Germany	3	1	2	4	3	6	0.500	56	120	0.467	9th–15th pool
4	Belgium	3	0	3	3	0	9	0.000	40	135	0.296	9th–15th pool

Date		Score		Set 1	Set 2	Set 3	Set 4	Set 5	Total	Report
26 Oct	Czechoslovakia	3–0	Belgium	15–1	15–0	15–3			45–4	Report
26 Oct	Poland	3–0	West Germany	15–0	15–3	15–2			45–5	Report
27 Oct	West Germany	3–0	Belgium	15–8	15–9	15–13			45–30	Report
27 Oct	Poland	3–2	Czechoslovakia	15–9	15–10	5–15	10–15	15–6	60–55	Report
28 Oct	Czechoslovakia	3–0	West Germany	15–0	15–4	15–2			45–6	Report
28 Oct	Poland	3–0	Belgium	15–3	15–0	15–3			45–6	Report

=== Pool D ===
- venue location: İzmir, Turkey

Pos	Team	Pld	W	L	Pts	SW	SL	SR	SPW	SPL	SPR	Qualification
1	Soviet Union	2	2	0	4	6	0	MAX	90	28	3.214	Final pool
2	Netherlands	2	1	1	3	3	3	1.000	66	53	1.245	Final pool
3	Switzerland	2	0	2	2	0	6	0.000	15	90	0.167	9th–15th pool

Date		Score		Set 1	Set 2	Set 3	Set 4	Set 5	Total	Report
26 Oct	Netherlands	3–0	Switzerland	15–1	15–5	15–2			45–8	Report
27 Oct	Soviet Union	3–0	Switzerland	15–2	15–3	15–2			45–7	Report
28 Oct	Soviet Union	3–0	Netherlands	15–10	15–7	15–4			45–21	Report

== Final round ==
=== 9th–15th pool ===
- venue location: Ankara, Turkey

Pos	Team	Pld	W	L	Pts	SW	SL	SR	SPW	SPL	SPR
1	Romania	6	6	0	12	18	0	MAX	270	47	5.745
2	West Germany	6	5	1	11	15	5	3.000	254	201	1.264
3	Italy	6	4	2	10	12	8	1.500	260	197	1.320
4	Turkey	6	3	3	9	12	10	1.200	243	263	0.924
5	Switzerland	6	2	4	8	8	15	0.533	219	302	0.725
6	Belgium	6	1	5	7	5	15	0.333	180	257	0.700
7	Sweden	6	0	6	6	1	18	0.056	122	281	0.434

Date		Score		Set 1	Set 2	Set 3	Set 4	Set 5	Total	Report
1 Nov	Romania	3–0	Italy	15–8	15–7	15–7			45–22	Report
1 Nov	Turkey	3–0	Sweden	15–7	15–10	15–9			45–26	Report
1 Nov	West Germany	3–0	Belgium	15–8	15–9	15–13			45–30	Report
2 Nov	Romania	3–0	Belgium	15–0	15–0	15–3			45–3	Report
2 Nov	Italy	3–0	Sweden	15–3	15–3	15–0			45–6	Report
2 Nov	West Germany	3–0	Switzerland	15–5	15–6	15–12			45–23	Report
3 Nov	West Germany	3–0	Italy	16–14	15–8	15–8			46–30	Report
3 Nov	Turkey	3–1	Switzerland	15–8	10–15	15–12	15–7		55–42	Report
3 Nov	Belgium	3–0	Sweden	15–6	15–9	15–6			45–21	Report
4 Nov	Italy	3–1	Turkey	15–10	15–12	13–15	15–1		58–38	Report
4 Nov	West Germany	3–0	Sweden	15–5	15–8	15–3			45–16	Report
4 Nov	Romania	3–0	Switzerland	15–1	15–1	15–3			45–5	Report
6 Nov	West Germany	3–2	Turkey	15–8	15–7	9–15	12–15	15–12	66–57	Report
6 Nov	Romania	3–0	Sweden	15–3	15–0	15–4			45–7	Report
6 Nov	Switzerland	3–2	Belgium	15–8	6–15	5–15	15–6	15–7	56–51	Report
7 Nov	Italy	3–1	Switzerland	15–11	15–6	15–17	15–3		60–37	Report
7 Nov	Turkey	3–0	Belgium	15–9	15–9	15–8			45–26	Report
7 Nov	Romania	3–0	West Germany	15–1	15–2	15–4			45–7	Report
8 Nov	Romania	3–0	Turkey	15–1	15–0	15–2			45–3	Report
8 Nov	Italy	3–0	Belgium	15–7	15–10	15–8			45–25	Report
8 Nov	Switzerland	3–1	Sweden	15–11	15–9	11–15	15–11		56–46	Report

=== Final pool ===
- venue location: İzmir, Turkey

Pos	Team	Pld	W	L	Pts	SW	SL	SR	SPW	SPL	SPR
1	Soviet Union	7	7	0	14	21	0	MAX	315	91	3.462
2	Poland	7	6	1	13	18	7	2.571	332	248	1.339
3	Czechoslovakia	7	5	2	12	17	7	2.429	307	221	1.389
4	East Germany	7	4	3	11	13	10	1.300	276	255	1.082
5	Hungary	7	3	4	10	11	13	0.846	262	271	0.967
6	Bulgaria	7	2	5	9	6	16	0.375	228	269	0.848
7	Netherlands	7	1	6	8	6	18	0.333	200	329	0.608
8	Israel	7	0	7	7	0	21	0.000	79	315	0.251

Date		Score		Set 1	Set 2	Set 3	Set 4	Set 5	Total	Report
1 Nov	Hungary	3–0	Israel	15–7	15–5	15–4			45–16	Report
1 Nov	Czechoslovakia	3–0	Netherlands	15–1	15–6	15–8			45–15	Report
1 Nov	Soviet Union	3–0	Bulgaria	15–5	15–3	15–0			45–8	Report
1 Nov	Poland	3–1	East Germany	15–11	17–15	13–15	15–10		60–51	Report
2 Nov	Netherlands	3–0	Israel	15–10	15–10	15–6			45–26	Report
2 Nov	Czechoslovakia	3–0	Bulgaria	15–6	15–9	15–10			45–25	Report
2 Nov	Poland	3–1	Hungary	15–8	3–15	17–15	15–10		50–48	Report
2 Nov	Soviet Union	3–0	East Germany	15–1	15–3	15–2			45–6	Report
3 Nov	Czechoslovakia	3–0	Israel	15–4	15–1	15–2			45–7	Report
3 Nov	Poland	3–0	Netherlands	15–3	15–10	15–3			45–16	Report
3 Nov	East Germany	3–0	Bulgaria	15–10	15–13	15–11			45–34	Report
3 Nov	Soviet Union	3–0	Hungary	15–2	15–0	15–0			45–2	Report
5 Nov	Poland	3–0	Israel	15–2	15–2	15–4			45–8	Report
5 Nov	East Germany	3–1	Netherlands	15–5	17–15	8–15	15–5		55–40	Report
5 Nov	Hungary	3–0	Bulgaria	15–12	15–12	15–11			45–35	Report
5 Nov	Soviet Union	3–0	Czechoslovakia	15–4	15–10	15–4			45–18	Report
6 Nov	Soviet Union	3–0	Israel	15–7	15–1	15–1			45–9	Report
6 Nov	Hungary	3–1	Netherlands	15–2	15–4	12–15	15–5		57–26	Report
6 Nov	Poland	3–0	Bulgaria	15–6	15–10	15–9			45–25	Report
6 Nov	Czechoslovakia	3–0	East Germany	15–9	15–13	15–7			45–29	Report
7 Nov	Soviet Union	3–0	Poland	15–7	15–10	15–10			45–27	Report
7 Nov	East Germany	3–0	Israel	15–2	15–2	15–2			45–6	Report
7 Nov	Bulgaria	3–1	Netherlands	15–8	11–15	15–4	15–10		56–37	Report
7 Nov	Czechoslovakia	3–1	Hungary	15–11	15–8	9–15	15–6		54–40	Report
8 Nov	East Germany	3–0	Hungary	15–12	15–8	15–5			45–25	Report
8 Nov	Bulgaria	3–0	Israel	15–0	15–1	15–6			45–7	Report
8 Nov	Poland	3–2	Czechoslovakia	15–9	15–10	5–15	10–15	15–6	60–55	Report
8 Nov	Soviet Union	3–0	Netherlands	15–10	15–7	15–4			45–21	Report

== Final ranking ==
Place	Team
1st place, gold medalist(s)	Soviet Union
2nd place, silver medalist(s)	Poland
3rd place, bronze medalist(s)	Czechoslovakia
4.	East Germany
5.	Hungary
6.	Bulgaria
7.	Netherlands
8.	Israel
9.	Romania
10.	West Germany
11.	Italy
12.	Turkey
13.	Switzerland
14.	Belgium
15.	Sweden

Qualified for the 1968 Olympic Games

1967 Women's European champions

Soviet Union
Sixth title
