= Liu Xiaotong =

Chinese volleyball player (born 1990)

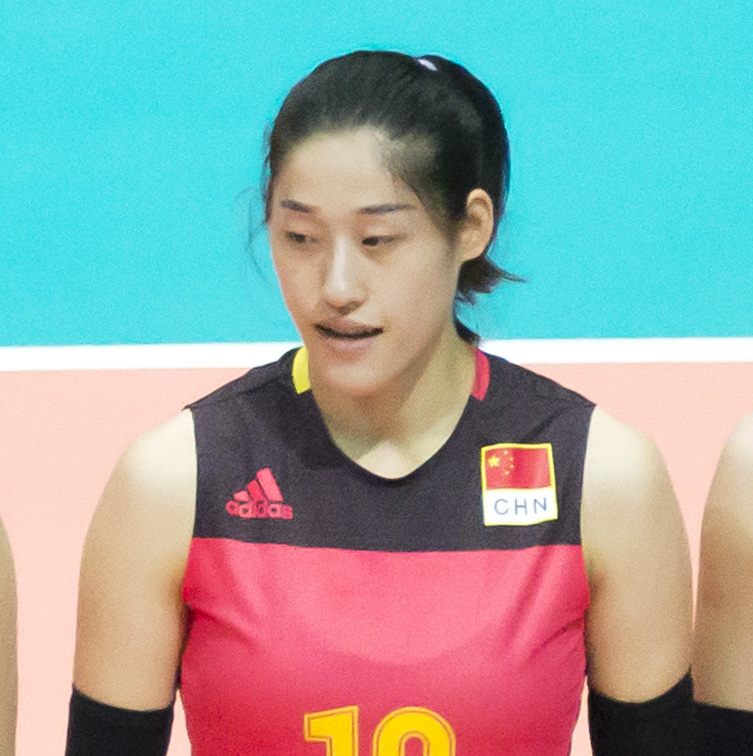

Personal information
- Nationality: Chinese
- Born: 16 February 1990 (age 36); Jilin, China
- Hometown: Jilin, China
- Height: 1.88 m (6 ft 2 in)
- Weight: 70 kg (154 lb)
- Spike: 321 cm (126 in)
- Block: 312 cm (123 in)

Volleyball information
- Position: Wing spiker
- Current club: Retired
- Number: 10

National team
2013–2021	China
Honours
Volleyball
Olympic Games
Gold medal – first place	2016 Rio de Janeiro	Team
World Championship
Silver medal – second place	2014 Italy	Team
Bronze medal – third place	2018 Japan	Team
FIVB World Cup
Gold medal – first place	2019 Japan	Team
Gold medal – first place	2015 Japan	Team
World Grand Champions Cup
Gold medal – first place	2017 Japan	Team
Volleyball Nations League
Bronze medal – third place	2018 Nanjing	Team
Bronze medal – third place	2019 Nanjing	Team
Asian Games
Gold medal – first place	2018 Jakarta-Palembang
Montreux Volley Masters
Gold medal – first place	2016 Switzerland
Bronze medal – third place	2017 Switzerland	Team

Liu Xiaotong (Chinese: 刘晓彤; pinyin: Liú Xiǎotóng; born 16 February 1990) is a Chinese retired volleyball player.

She participated at the 2014 FIVB Volleyball World Grand Prix, 2014 Montreux Volley Masters, 2016 Montreux Volley Masters, 2017 Montreux Volley Masters, 2018 Montreux Volley Masters, 2019 Montreux Volley Masters, and the 2018 FIVB Volleyball Women's Nations League. On club level, she plays for Beijing.

== Clubs ==
- (China) Beijing (2006 - 2021)
- Temporary transfer to Tianjin 2017-2018 Season Final stage

== Awards ==
- 2014 FIVB World Grand Prix "1st Best Outside Spiker"
- 2018–19 Chinese Volleyball League "Best outside spiker"

Awards
Preceded by (Serbia) Brankica Mihajlović and (China) Zhu Ting	Best Outside Spiker of FIVB World Grand Prix; 2014 (with (Japan) Miyu Nagaoka)	Succeeded by (Brazil) Natália Pereira and (United States) Kelsey Robinson
