= Sarah Trösch =

Swiss volleyball player

Personal information
- Nationality: Swiss
- Born: 28 September 1994 (age 32)
- Hometown: Solothurn
- Height: 1.76 m (5 ft 9 1/2 in)
- Weight: 70 kg (150 lb)

Volleyball information
- Position: Setter
- Current club: (Switzerland) NUC VOLLEYBALL
- Number: 13
Honours
Women's volleyball
Representing Switzerland

Sarah Trösch (born 28 September 1994) is a Swiss volleyball player. She is a member of the Women's National Team. She participated at the 2017 Montreux Volley Masters. She plays for NUC VOLLEYBALL.

== Clubs ==
- (Switzerland) Viteos Neuchatel Université (2017)
- (Switzerland) Volley Lugano (2018–)
