= Zheng Yixin =

Chinese volleyball player

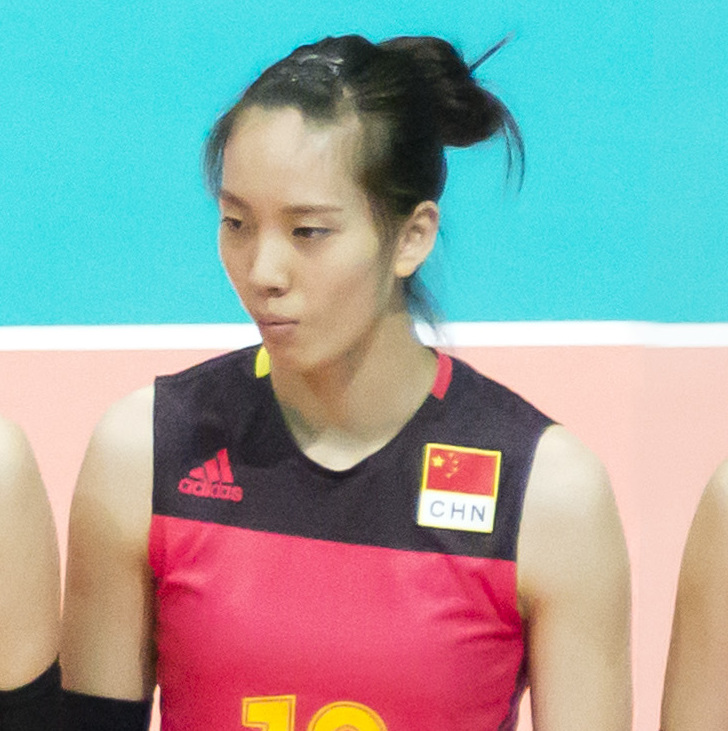
- in the China team for Volleyball

Personal information
- Full name: Zheng Yixin (郑益昕)
- Nickname: Xiao Qing Xin (小清新)
- Nationality: Chinese
- Born: 6 May 1995 Zhangzhou, Fujian, China
- Home town: Zhangzhou, Fujian, China
- Height: 1.88 m (6 ft 2 in)
- Weight: 69 kg (152 lb)
- Spike: 315 cm (124 in)
- Block: 305 cm (120 in)

Volleyball information
- Position: Middle Blocker / Opposite Spiker
- Number: 16

Career
- Years: Team
- 2019 – present: Guangdong

National team
- Years: Team
- 2012 - 2013 2015 2015 - 2019 , 2022–2024: China U20; China U23; China
Honours
Representing China
World Grand Champions Cup
Gold medal – first place	2017 Japan	Team
Nations League
Bronze medal – third place	2019 Nanjing	Team
Asian Cup Championship
Gold medal – first place	2016 Vinh Phuc	Team
Gold medal – first place	2018 Nakhon Ratchasima	Team
Montreux Volley Masters
Gold medal – first place	2016 Switzerland	Team
Bronze medal – third place	2017 Switzerland	Team
Asian Games
Gold medal – first place	2022 Hangzhou	Team

Zheng Yixin (Chinese: 郑益昕; born 6 May 1995 in Zhangzhou, Fujian) is a Chinese volleyball player. She is the Middle Blocker of China women's national volleyball team. She played at 2015 FIVB Volleyball World Grand Prix Final round, which was held in Omaha, Nebraska.

She was part of the China team in 2017 who took part in the FIVB Volleyball World Grand Prix in Macao. The team who included Zhu Ting, Qian Jingwen, Wang Yunlu played against the US, Turkey and Italy. The final part of the competition was in Nanjing in China where the team came fourth.

== Personal ==
Zheng Yixin plays for the Fujian Yango Women's Volleyball Club. Her father was a high jumper.

== Clubs ==
- (China) Fujian Yango Women's Volleyball Club (2014-)
- (Thailand) Diamond Food (2020)
