= Qian Zhang =

Qian Zhang (Chinese: 張黔) is a Chinese computer scientist, the Tencent Professor of Engineering and Chair Professor in the Department of Computer Science and Engineering at Hong Kong University of Science and Technology. She was named Fellow of the Institute of Electrical and Electronics Engineers (IEEE) in 2012 for contributions to the mobility and spectrum management of wireless networks and mobile communications.
