= Laura Künzler =

Swiss volleyball player

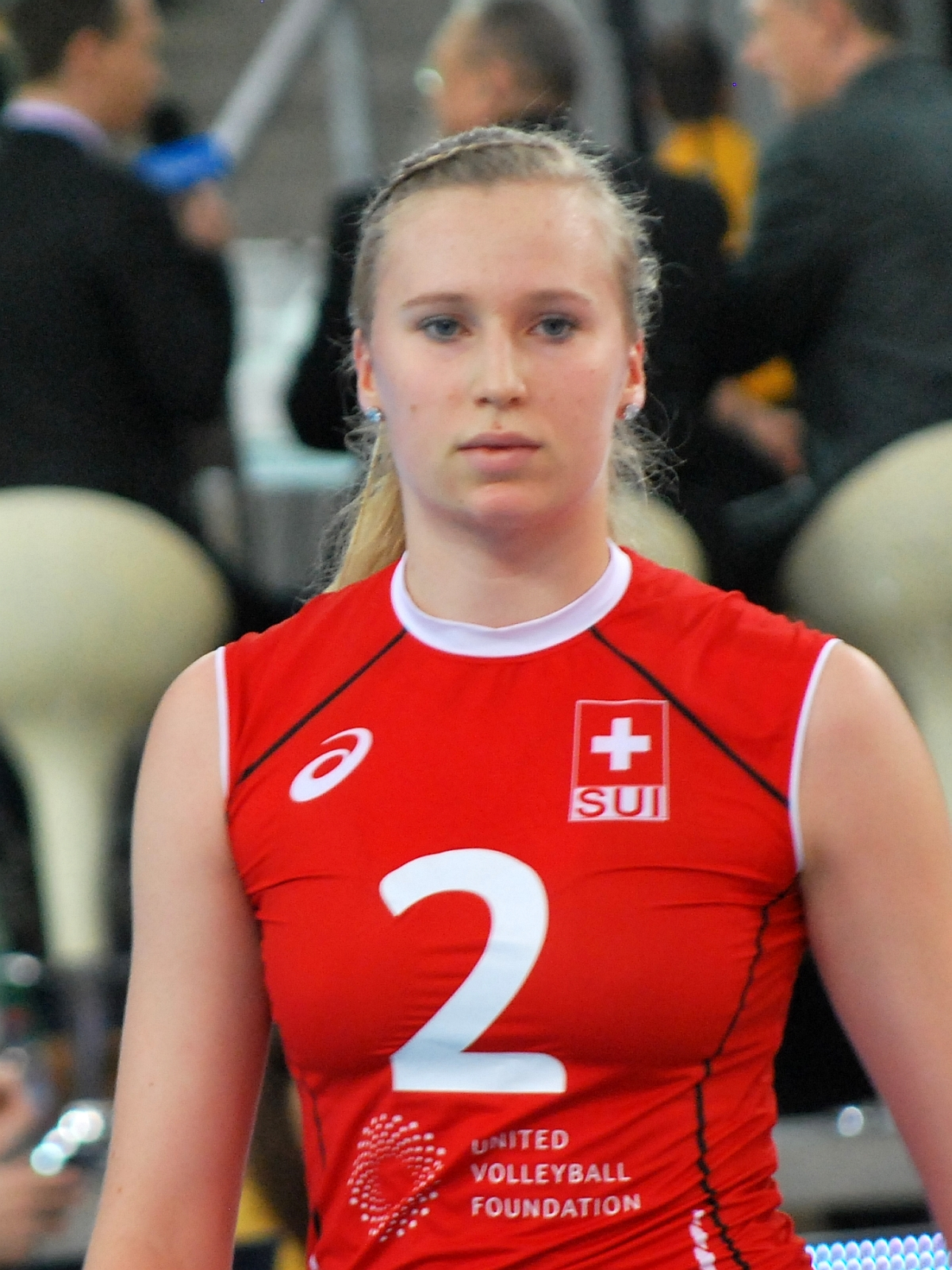

Personal information
- Nationality: Swiss
- Born: 25 December 1996 (age 29) Berkeley, California, U.S.
- Height: 1.89 m (6 ft 2 1/2 in)
- Weight: 69 kg (152 lb)
- Spike: 298 cm (117 in)
- Block: 287 cm (113 in)

Volleyball information
- Position: Outside hitter
- Current club: (Italy) UYBA Volley
- Number: 14

Career
- Years: Team
- –2012: (Switzerland) Volley Neuenhof
- 2012–2014: (Switzerland) VBC Kanti Baden
- 2014–2017: (Switzerland) Sm’Aesch Pfeffingen
- 2017–2019: (Germany) Rote Raben Vilsbiburg
- 2019–2020: (France) ASPTT Mulhouse
- 2020–2021: (France) Pays d'Aix Venelles
- 2021–2022: (Germany) VC Wiesbaden
- 2022–2023: (Germany) Allianz MTV Stuttgart
- 2023–2024: (Turkey) Nilüfer Belediyespor
- 2024–: (Italy) UYBA Volley

National team
- Years: Team
- 2013–: Switzerland

Laura Künzler (born 25 December 1996 Berkeley, California) is a Swiss volleyball player and a member of the Swiss national team. She participated at the 2017 Montreux Volley Masters, and 2018 Montreux Volley Masters.
