= Tabea Dalliard =

Swiss volleyball player (born 1994)

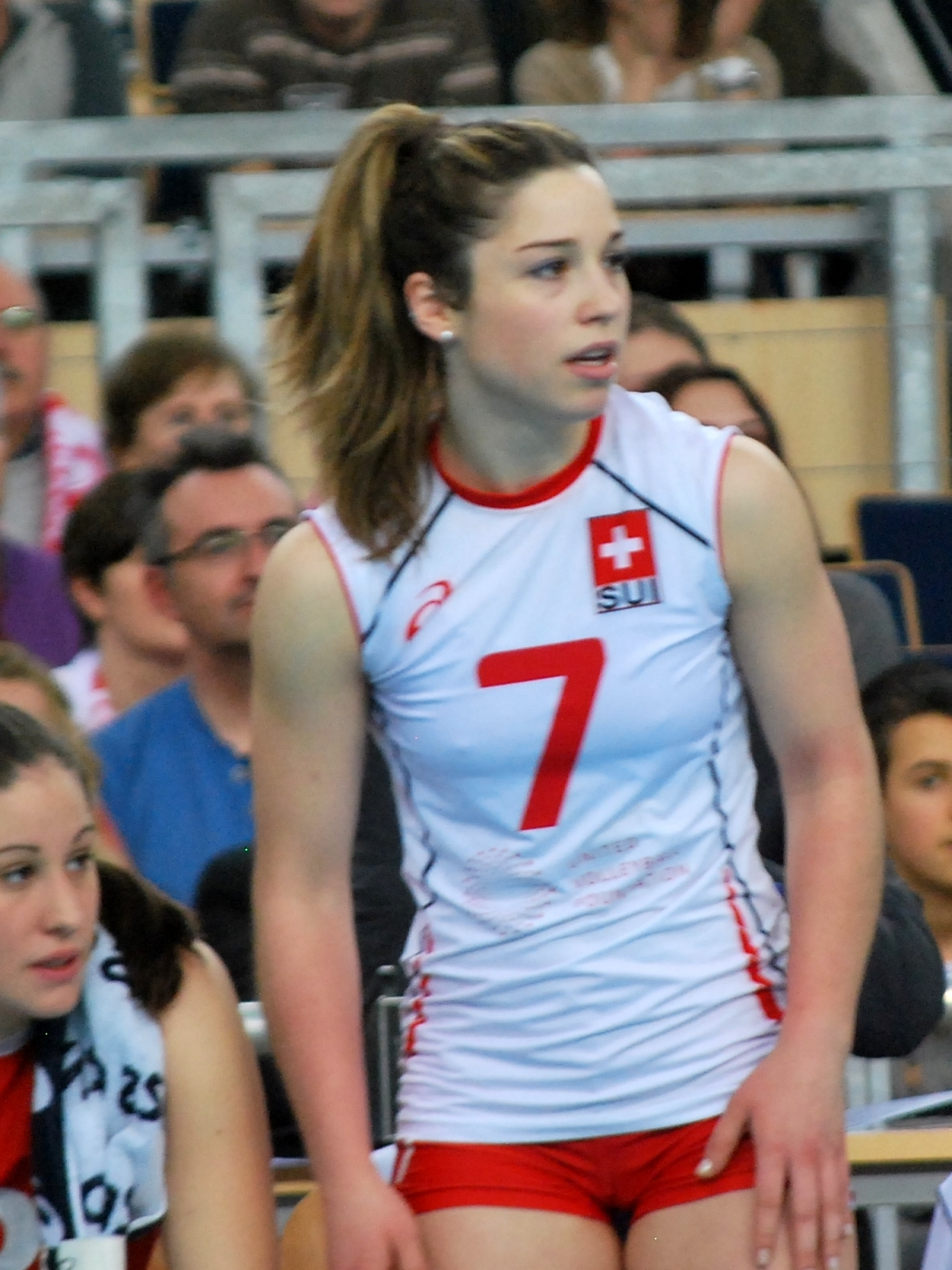

Personal information
- Nationality: Swiss
- Born: 18 July 1994 (age 32)
- Hometown: Morel-Filet, Switzerland
- Height: 1.69 m (5 ft 6 1/2 in)
- Weight: 63 kg (139 lb)
- Spike: 274 cm (108 in)
- Block: 265 cm (104 in)
- Education: Point Park University

Volleyball information
- Position: Libero
- Current club: (Switzerland) Viteos NUC
- Number: 5
Honours
Women's volleyball
Representing Switzerland

Tabea Dalliard (born 18 July 1994) is a Swiss volleyball player. She is a member of the Women's National Team. She participated at the 2013 Women's European Volleyball Championship, and 2017 Montreux Volley Masters. She played for Point Park University. She plays for Viteos NUC.

== Clubs ==
- (Switzerland) Viteos Neuchatel Université 2016-2019
- (Switzerland) Viteos NUC (2017–)
