= Patricia Schauss =

Swiss volleyball player (born 1988)

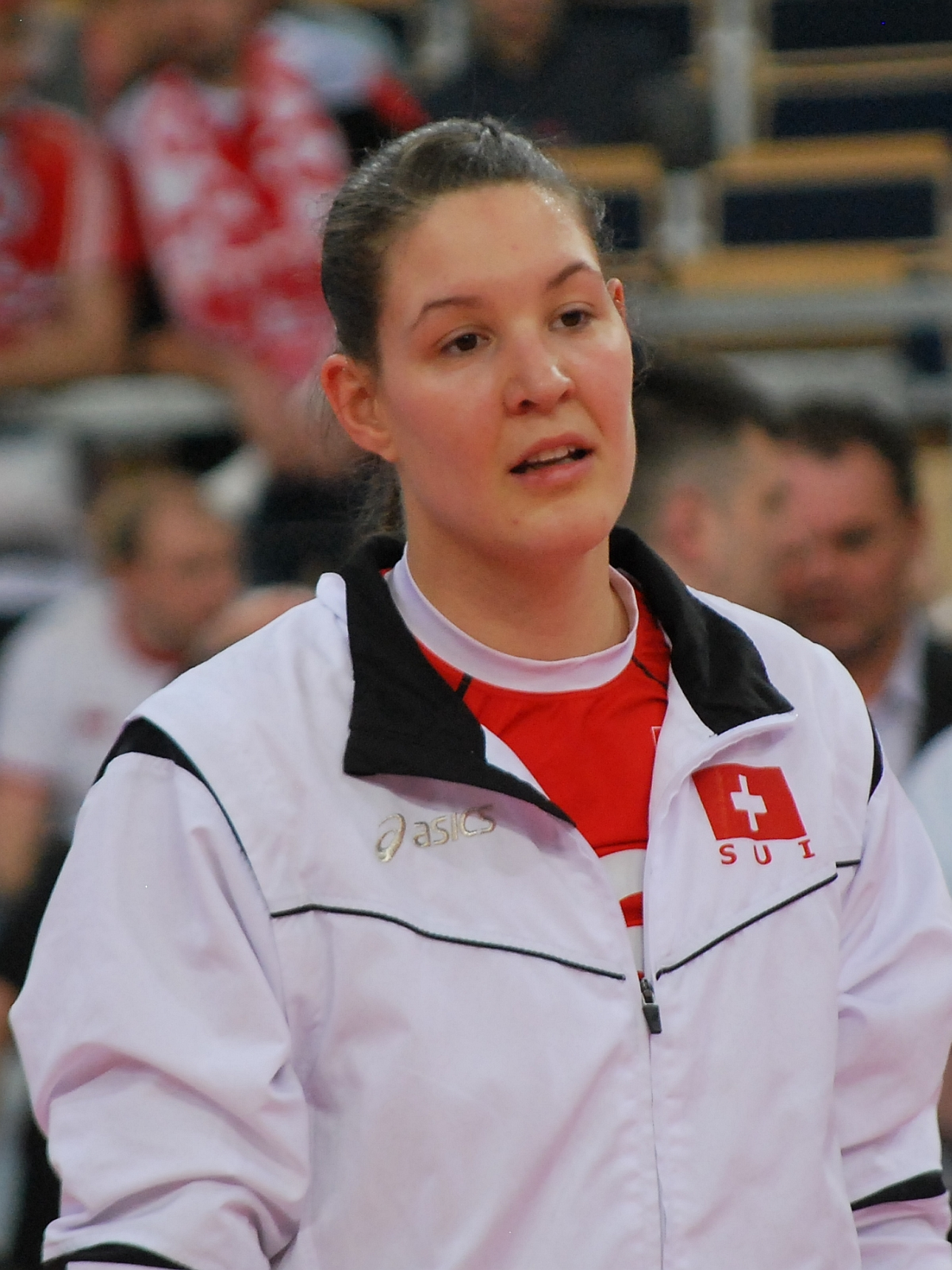
- Patricia Schauss in 2014

Personal information
- Nationality: Swiss
- Born: 14 May 1988 (age 38)
- Height: 188 cm (74 in)
- Weight: 77 kg (170 lb)

Volleyball information
- Position: central
- Number: 6 (national team)

Career
Years	Teams
2013	(Switzerland) Volero Zurigo

National team
2013	Switzerland

Patricia Schauss (born 14 May 1988) is a Swiss female former volleyball player, playing as a central. She was part of the Switzerland women's national volleyball team.

She competed at the 2013 Women's European Volleyball Championship. On club level she played for Volero Zurigo.
