= Martina Halter =

Swiss volleyball player (born 1994)

Personal information
- Nationality: Swiss
- Born: 5 September 1994 (age 32)
- Height: 1.92 m (6 ft 3 1/2 in)
- Weight: 78 kg (172 lb)
- Spike: 300 cm (120 in)
- Block: 278 cm (109 in)

Volleyball information
- Position: Middle blocker
- Current club: (Switzerland) Viteos NUC
- Number: 3
Honours
Women's volleyball
Representing Switzerland

Martina Halter (born 5 September 1994) is a Swiss volleyball player. She is a member of the Women's National Team. She participated at the 2013 Women's European Volleyball Championship, and 2017 Montreux Volley Masters. She plays for Viteos NUC.

== Clubs ==
- (Switzerland) Viteos Neuchatel Université
- (Switzerland) Viteos NUC (2017–)
