= Lenka Dürr =

German volleyball player

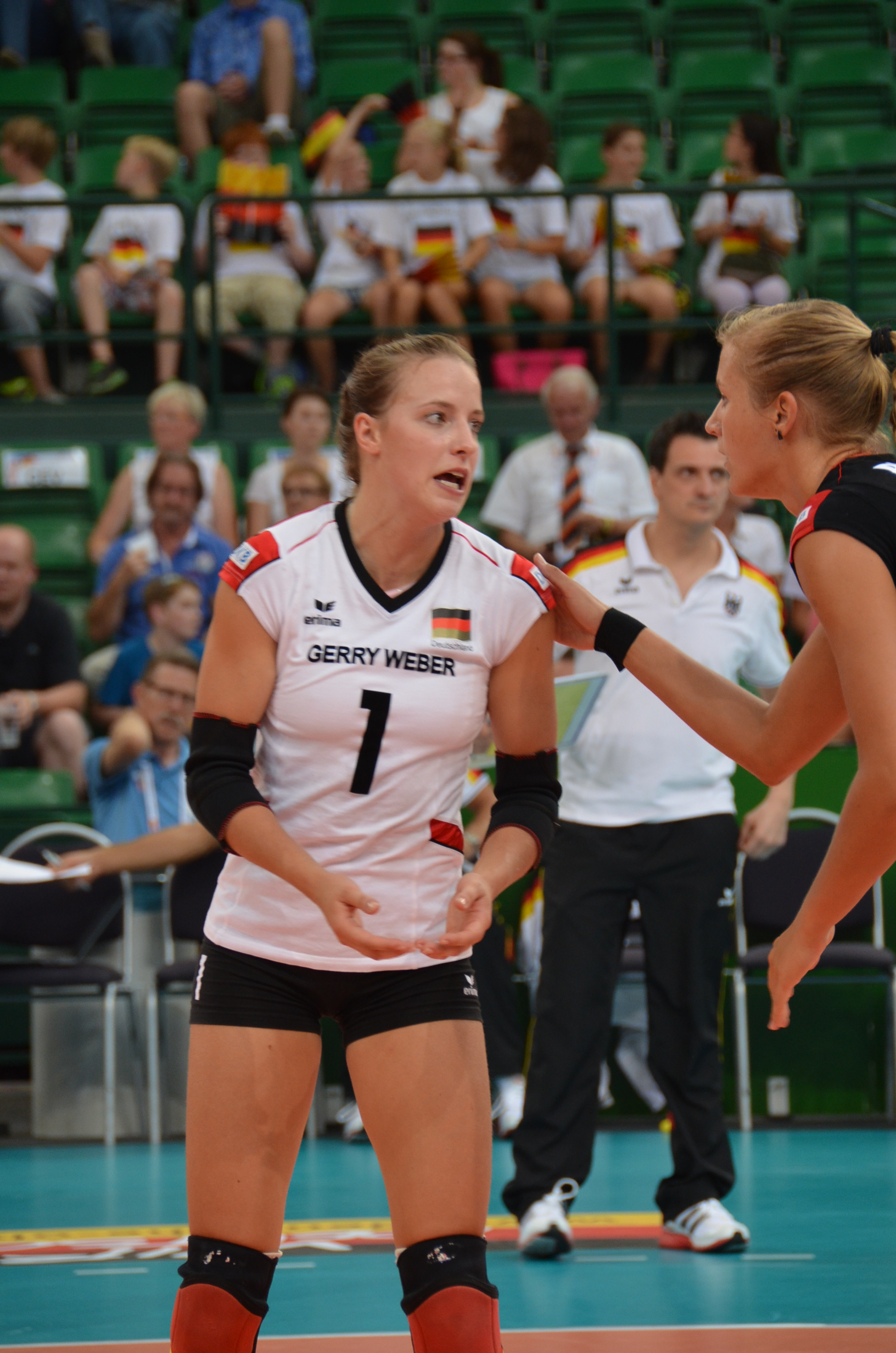

Personal information
- Full name: Lenka Dürr
- Nationality: German
- Born: 10 December 1990 (age 35); Memmingen, Germany
- Height: 1.71 m (5 ft 7 1/2 in)
- Weight: 59 kg (130 lb)
- Spike: 280 cm (110 in)
- Block: 270 cm (110 in)

Volleyball information
- Position: Libero
Medal record
Women's volleyball
Representing Germany
European Championship
Silver medal – second place	2011 Italy/Serbia	Team
Silver medal – second place	2013 Germany	Team
FIVB Grand Prix
Bronze medal – third place	2009 Tokyo	Team
Montreux Volley Masters
Gold medal – first place	2014 Switzerland	Team
Silver medal – second place	2017 Switzerland	Team

Lenka Dürr (born 10 December 1990 in Memmingen) is a former German volleyball player, who played as a libero. She was a member of the Germany national team.

She participated at the 2017 FIVB Volleyball World Grand Prix, 2018 FIVB Volleyball Women's Nations League, 2011 Montreux Volley Masters, and 2019 Montreux Volley Masters.

== Clubs ==
- (Germany) FTSV Straubing (2005–2006)
- (Germany) Rote Raben Vilsbiburg (2006–2013)
- (Azerbaijan) Igtisadchi Baku (2013–2014)
- (Azerbaijan) Azeryol Baku (2014–2015)
- (Poland) Impel Wrocław (2015–2016)
- (Germany) Schweriner SC (2016–2017)
- (Romania) CSM Târgoviște (2017–2018)
- (Germany) Rote Raben Vilsbiburg (2018–2019)
- (Germany) Dresdner SC (2019–2021)

== Awards ==
=== Individuals ===
- 2014 Montreux Volley Masters "Best Libero"
- 2017 Montreux Volley Masters "Best Libero"
