= Ségolène Girard =

Swiss volleyball player

Personal information
- Nationality: Swiss
- Born: 18 November 1995 (age 30)
- Height: 1.80 m (5 ft 11 in)
- Weight: 66 kg (146 lb)
- Spike: 280 cm (110 in)
- Block: 2,750 cm (1,080 in)

Volleyball information
- Position: Middle blocker
- Current club: (Switzerland) Vitéos Neuchatel
- Number: 15
Honours
Women's volleyball
Representing Switzerland

Ségolène Girard (born 18 November 1995) is a Swiss volleyball player. She is a member of the Women's National Team. She participated at the 2016 Montreux Volley Masters. She plays for Vitéos Neuchatel.
