= Femke Stoltenborg =

Dutch volleyball player

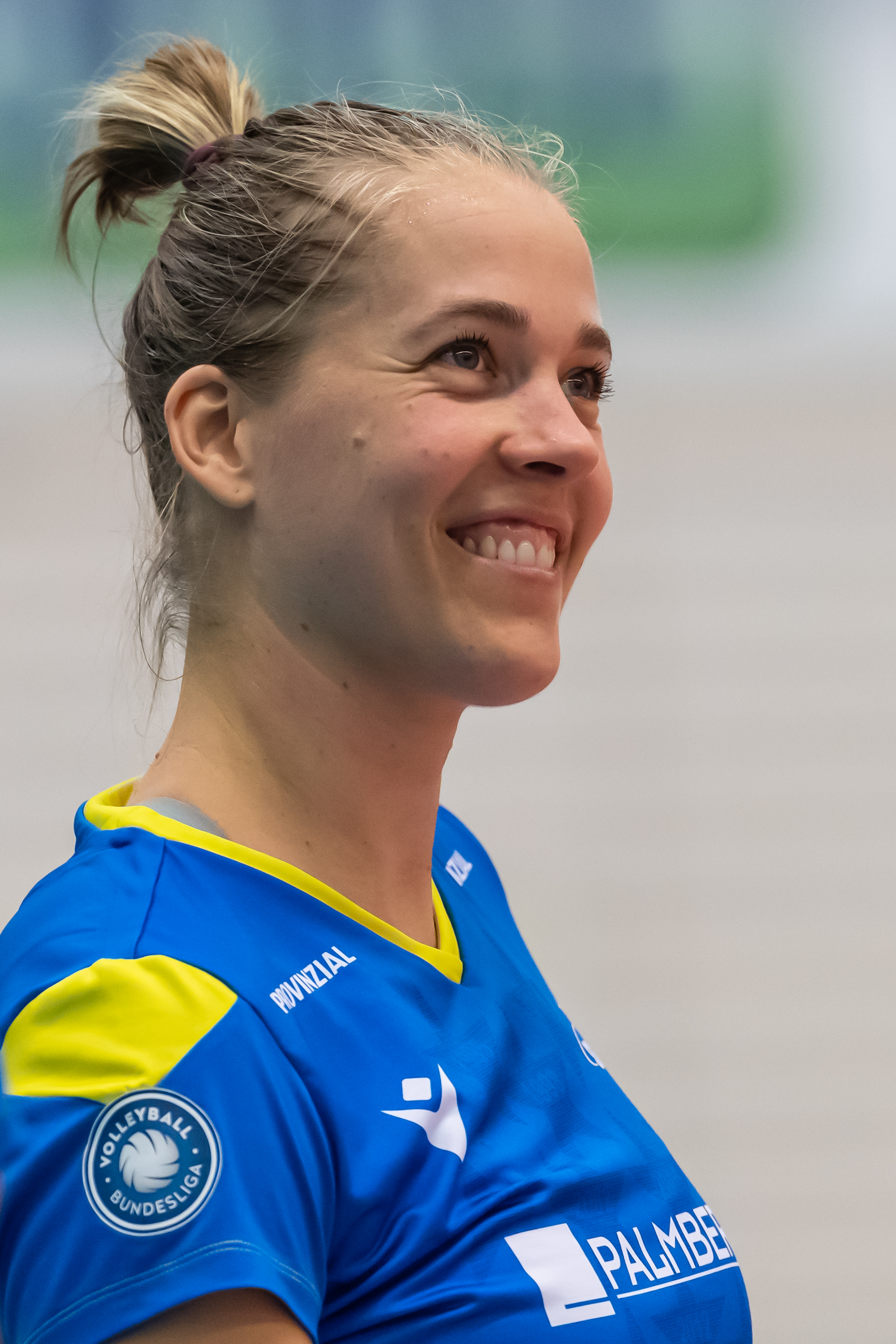
- Stoltenborg in 2021

Personal information
- Nationality: Dutch
- Born: 30 July 1991 (age 35); Winterswijk, Netherlands
- Height: 1.89 m (6 ft 2 in)
- Weight: 81 kg (179 lb)
- Spike: 303 cm (119 in)
- Block: 299 cm (118 in)

Volleyball information
- Position: Setter
- Current club: Allianz MTV Stuttgart
- Number: 2

Career
Years	Teams
2007–2009; 2009–2010; 2010–2011; 2011–2012; 2012–2013; 2013–2014; 2014–2015; 2015–2016; 2016–2017; 2017–	Longa '59 Lichtenvoorde; HAN Volleybal; TVC Amstelveen; Dresdner SC; VT Aurubis Hamburg; Ladies in Black Aachen; Volley 2002 Forlì; Allianz MTV Stuttgart; Ladies in Black Aachen; Allianz MTV Stuttgart

National team
Netherlands
Honours
Women's volleyball
Representing the Netherlands
World Grand Prix
Bronze medal – third place	2016 Bangkok
European Championship
Silver medal – second place	2015 Belgium/Netherlands
Silver medal – second place	2017 Azerbaijan/Georgia

Femke Stoltenborg (pronounced [ˈfɛmkə ˈstɔltə(m)ˌbɔr(ə)x]; born 30 July 1991) is a Dutch volleyball player, who plays as a setter. She is a member of the Netherlands Women's National Team. She participated at the 2010 FIVB Volleyball World Grand Prix, and 2017 FIVB Volleyball World Grand Prix.

On the club level, she plays for Ladies in Black Aachen.
