= Maja Storck =

Swiss volleyball player (born 1998)

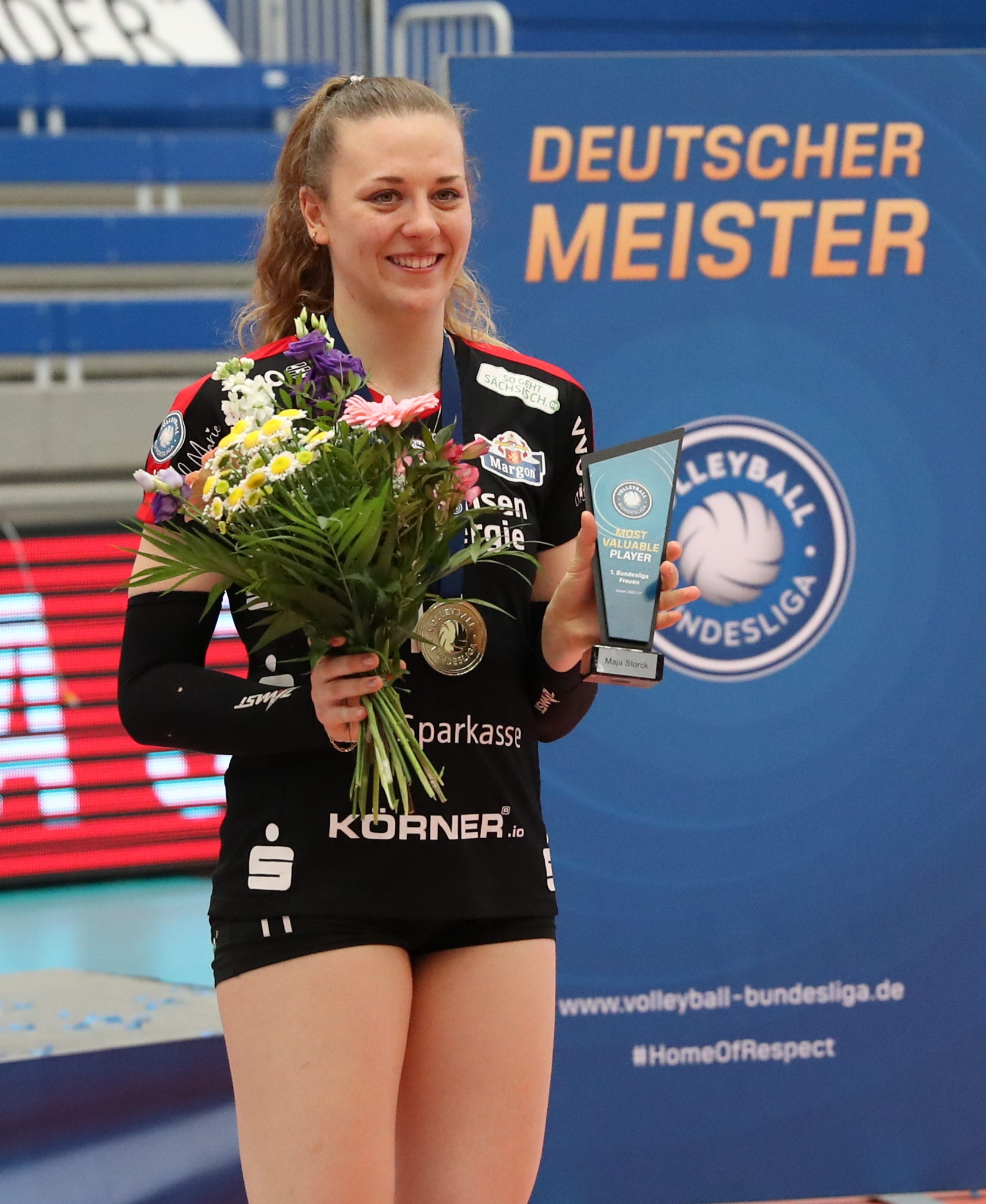

Personal information
- Nationality: Swiss
- Born: 8 October 1998 (age 28); Münchenstein, Switzerland
- Height: 1.84 m (6 ft 1/2 in)
- Weight: 72 kg (159 lb)
- Spike: 310 cm (120 in)
- Block: 298 cm (117 in)

Volleyball information
- Position: Wing spiker
- Current club: (Germany) Dresdner SC
- Number: 3
Honours
Women's volleyball
Representing Switzerland

Maja Storck (born 8 November 1998) is a Swiss volleyball player. She is a member of the Women's National Team. She participated at the 2018 Montreux Volley Masters. She plays for Dresdner SC.
