= Switzerland women's national volleyball team =

Women's national volleyball team representing Switzerland

Switzerland
- Association: Swiss Volley (SV)
- Confederation: CEV
- Head coach: Lauren Bertolacci
- FIVB ranking: 33 ▼1 (24 May 2026)

Uniforms
Home

World Championship
- Appearances: 1 (First in 2027)

European Championship
- Appearances: 6 (First in 1967)
- Best result: 12th (1971)
- www.volleyball.ch/

The Switzerland women's national volleyball team is the national team of Switzerland. It takes part in international volleyball competitions.

== Results ==
=== World Cup ===
World Cup record
Year	Round	Position	Pld	W	L	SW	SL	Squad
(United States) (Canada) 2027	Qualified							
Total	0 titles	1/21	0	0	0	0	0	—

=== European Championship ===
Champions Runners-up Third place Fourth place

European Championship record
Year	Round	Position	Pld	W	L	SW	SL	Squad
(Czechoslovakia) 1949	Did not participate or qualify							
(Bulgaria) 1950	Did not participate or qualify							
(France) 1951	Did not participate or qualify							
(Romania) 1955	Did not participate or qualify							
(Czechoslovakia) 1958	Did not participate or qualify							
(Romania) 1963	Did not participate or qualify							
(Turkey) 1967	Final round	13th	8	2	6	8	21	Squad
(Italy) 1971	Final round	12th	7	1	6	3	19	Squad
(Socialist Federal Republic of Yugoslavia) 1975	Did not participate or qualify							
(Finland) 1977	Did not participate or qualify							
(France) 1979	Did not participate or qualify							
(Bulgaria) 1981	Did not participate or qualify							
(East Germany) 1983	Did not participate or qualify							
(Netherlands) 1985	Did not participate or qualify							
(Belgium) 1987	Did not participate or qualify							
(West Germany) 1989	Did not participate or qualify							
(Italy) 1991	Did not participate or qualify							
(Czech Republic) 1993	Did not participate or qualify							
(Netherlands) 1995	Did not participate or qualify							
(Czech Republic) 1997	Did not participate or qualify							
(Italy) 1999	Did not participate or qualify							
(Bulgaria) 2001	Did not participate or qualify							
(Turkey) 2003	Did not participate or qualify							
(Croatia) 2005	Did not participate or qualify							
(Belgium) / (Luxembourg) 2007	Did not participate or qualify							
(Poland) 2009	Did not participate or qualify							
(Italy) / (Serbia) 2011	Did not participate or qualify							
(Germany) / (Switzerland) 2013	Group stage	14th	3	0	3	2	9	Squad
(Netherlands) 2015	Did not qualify							
(Azerbaijan) (Georgia (country)) 2017	Did not qualify							
(Slovakia) / (Hungary) / (Poland) / (Turkey) 2019	Group stage	19th	5	1	4	5	13	
(Serbia) / (Bulgaria) / (Croatia) / (Romania) 2021	Group stage	21st	5	1	4	4	14	
(Belgium) / (Italy) / (Estonia) / (Germany) 2023	Round of 16	14th	6	2	4	9	15	
(Azerbaijan) / (Czech Republic) / (Sweden) / (Turkey) 2026	Did not qualify							
(Slovakia) / (Spain) / (N/A) / (N/A) 2028	Qualified							
Total	0 titles	6/35	34	7	27	31	91	—

=== European Volleyball League ===
Champions Runners-up Third place Fourth place

European League record
Year	Round	Position	Pld	W	L	SW	SL	Squad
2009	Did not participate							
2010	Did not participate							
2011	Did not participate							
2012	Group stage	11th	12	0	12	3	36	Squad
2013	Did not participate							
2014	Did not participate							
2015	Did not participate							
2016	Did not participate							
2017	Did not participate							
2018	Group stage	17th	6	3	3	12	11	Squad
2019	Did not participate							
2021	Did not participate							
2022	Did not participate							
2023	Did not participate							
2024	Did not participate							
2025	Silver League champions	13th	8	7	1	23	3	Squad
2026	League round	5th	6	5	1	17	5	Squad
Total	0 titles	4/17	32	15	17	55	55	—

== Team ==
=== Current squad ===
The following is the Switzerland roster in the 2023 Women's European Volleyball Championship

Head coach: Lauren Bertolacci

No.	Name	Date of birth	Height	Weight	2022 Club
11	Maja Storck				Chieri
14	Laura Künzler				Stuttgart

The following was the squad who represented Switzerland in the 2013 Women's European Volleyball Championship.

No.	Name	Date of birth	Height	Weight	2013 club
1	Kristel Marbach	14 November 1988	180 cm (5 ft 11 in)	70 kg (154 lb)	Volero Zurigo
3	Laura Sirucek	5 April 1990	177 cm (5 ft 10 in)	70 kg (154 lb)	Kanti Sciaffusa
4	Elena Steinemann	8 December 1994	178 cm (5 ft 10 in)	68 kg (150 lb)	Kanti Sciaffusa
5	Martina Halter	9 May 1994	190 cm (6 ft 3 in)	78 kg (172 lb)	FC Lucerna
6	Patricia Schauss	14 May 1988	188 cm (6 ft 2 in)	77 kg (170 lb)	Volero Zurigo
7	Tabea Dalliard	18 July 1994	167 cm (5 ft 6 in)	62 kg (137 lb)	VB Franches-Mont.
8	Sandra Stocker	26 December 1987	186 cm (6 ft 1 in)	80 kg (176 lb)	Neuchâtel UCV
9	Nadine Jenny	13 June 1990	174 cm (5 ft 9 in)	60 kg (132 lb)	Volero Zurigo
10	Stéphanie Bannwart	11 January 1991	184 cm (6 ft 0 in)	80 kg (176 lb)	Sm'Aesch Pfeffingen
11	Mandy Wigger	4 May 1987	191 cm (6 ft 3 in)	97 kg (214 lb)	Volleyball Köniz
12	Mélanie Pauli	5 May 1980	162 cm (5 ft 4 in)	60 kg (132 lb)	Volleyball Köniz
13	Inès Granvorka	13 August 1991	177 cm (5 ft 10 in)	70 kg (154 lb)	Volero Zurigo
16	Marina Kühner	26 April 1991	181 cm (5 ft 11 in)	65 kg (143 lb)	Volleyball Köniz
17	Laura Unternährer	11 July 1993	177 cm (5 ft 10 in)	68 kg (150 lb)	Volero Zurigo

== See also ==
- Switzerland men's national volleyball team
