= 2017 Montreux Volley Masters =

Women's volleyball tournament

Tournament details
- Host country: Switzerland
- Dates: 6–11 June 2017
- Teams: 8
- Venue: 1 (in 1 host city)

Final positions
- Champions: Brazil (7th title)

Tournament awards
- MVP: Ana Carolina da Silva (BRA)

The 2017 Montreux Volley Masters is a women's volleyball competition set in Montreux, Switzerland.

== Participating teams ==
Pool A	Pool B
China (Defending champion); Netherlands; Argentina; Switzerland	Brazil; Germany; Thailand; Poland

== Group stage ==
=== Group A ===
Pos	Team	Pld	W	L	Pts	SW	SL	SR	SPW	SPL	SPR	Qualification
1	Argentina	3	3	0	7	9	4	2.250	285	274	1.040	Semifinals
2	China	3	2	1	6	8	5	1.600	288	254	1.134	Semifinals
3	Netherlands	3	1	2	5	7	7	1.000	305	288	1.059	
4	Switzerland	3	0	3	0	1	9	0.111	186	248	0.750	

Date	Time		Score		Set 1	Set 2	Set 3	Set 4	Set 5	Total	Report
6 June	16:30	China	3–0	Switzerland	25–15	25–16	25–16			75–47	P2 P3
6 June	21:15	Netherlands	2–3	Argentina	22–25	25–27	25–14	25–23	9–15	106–104	P2 P3
7 June	18:45	China	3–2	Netherlands	25–27	25–22	25–16	17–25	15–11	107–101	P2 P3
8 June	16:30	Netherlands	3–1	Switzerland	23–25	25–14	25–18	25–20		98–77	P2 P3
8 June	21:15	Argentina	3–2	China	25–20	18–25	23–25	25–23	15–13	106–106	P2 P3
9 June	21:15	Switzerland	0–3	Argentina	21–25	21–25	20–25			62–75	P2 P3

=== Group B ===
Pos	Team	Pld	W	L	Pts	SW	SL	SR	SPW	SPL	SPR	Qualification
1	Brazil	3	2	1	7	8	5	1.600	298	273	1.092	Semifinals
2	Germany	3	2	1	6	8	6	1.333	295	294	1.003	Semifinals
3	Poland	3	2	1	5	7	6	1.167	297	276	1.076	
4	Thailand	3	0	3	0	3	9	0.333	249	296	0.841	

Date	Time		Score		Set 1	Set 2	Set 3	Set 4	Set 5	Total	Report
6 June	18:45	Brazil	3–1	Poland	25–20	21–25	25–23	26–24		97–92	P2 P3
7 June	16:30	Thailand	1–3	Poland	17–25	25–22	23–25	25–27		90–99	P2 P3
7 June	21:15	Brazil	2–3	Germany	17–25	25–20	22–25	25–23	13–15	102–108	P2 P3
8 June	18:45	Germany	3–1	Thailand	25–22	23–25	25–19	25–20		98–86	P2 P3
9 June	16:30	Germany	2–3	Poland	25–21	25–20	19–25	12–25	8–15	89–106	P2 P3
9 June	18:45	Thailand	1–3	Brazil	16–25	26–24	17–25	14–25		73–99	P2 P3

== Classification round ==
Date	Time		Score		Set 1	Set 2	Set 3	Set 4	Set 5	Total	Report
10 June	13:00	Netherlands	3–1	Thailand	25–22	25–18	22–25	25–8		97–73	P2 P3
10 June	15:30	Poland	3–0	Switzerland	25–16	25–16	25–16			75–48	P2 P3

== Final round ==
Semifinal
10 June
Argentina	1
Germany	3
10 June
Brazil	3
China	1

Final
11 June
Germany	0
Brazil	3
Third place match
11 June
Argentina	1
China	3

=== Semifinal ===
Date	Time		Score		Set 1	Set 2	Set 3	Set 4	Set 5	Total	Report
10 June	18.30	Argentina	1–3	Germany	27–25	19–25	25–27	19–25		90–102	P2 P3
10 June	21.00	Brazil	3–1	China	25–17	25–22	27–29	25–16		102–84	P2 P3

=== 3rd place ===
Date	Time		Score		Set 1	Set 2	Set 3	Set 4	Set 5	Total	Report
11 June	13:30	Argentina	1–3	China	21–25	12–25	25–20	19–25		77–95	P2 P3

=== Final ===
Date	Time		Score		Set 1	Set 2	Set 3	Set 4	Set 5	Total	Report
11 June	16:00	Germany	0–3	Brazil	21–25	18–25	20–25			59–75	P2 P3

== Final standings ==
Rank	Team
1st place, gold medalist(s)	Brazil
2nd place, silver medalist(s)	Germany
3rd place, bronze medalist(s)	China
4	Argentina
5	Poland
5	Netherlands
7	Switzerland
7	Thailand

== Awards ==
- Most valuable player
  (Brazil) Ana Carolina da Silva
- Best outside spikers
  (Brazil) Natália Pereira
  (Argentina) Yamila Nizetich
- Best libero
  (Germany) Lenka Dürr
- Best middle blockers
  (Brazil) Ana Carolina da Silva
  (Germany) Marie Schölzel
- Best setter
  (Brazil) Roberta Ratzke
- Best opposite spiker
  (China) Gong Xiangyu
- Special awards Crowd favorite
  (Thailand) Pimpichaya Kokram
