= 2015 Women's European Volleyball Championship squads =

This article shows all participating team squads at the 2015 Women's European Volleyball Championship, held in the Netherlands and Belgium from 26 September to 4 October 2015.

== Pool A ==
=== Italy ===
- Head Coach: Marco Bonitta

Players
#	Name	Position	Birth Year	Height	Weight	Spike	Block
1	Indre Sorokaite	Opposite	1988	185 m (606 ft 11 in)	82 kg (181 lb)	310 m (1,017 ft 1 in)	235 m (771 ft 0 in)
2	Ofelia Malinov	Setter	1996	184 m (603 ft 8 in)	67 kg (148 lb)	306 m (1,003 ft 11 in)	230 m (754 ft 7 in)
5	Caterina Bosetti	Outside-spiker	1994	177 m (580 ft 9 in)	63 kg (139 lb)	318 m (1,043 ft 4 in)	232 m (761 ft 2 in)
6	Monica De Gennaro	Libero	1987	172 m (564 ft 4 in)	61 kg (134 lb)	280 m (918 ft 8 in)	215 m (705 ft 5 in)
7	Martina Guiggi	Middle-blocker	1984	187 m (613 ft 6 in)	81 kg (179 lb)	317 m (1,040 ft 0 in)	240 m (787 ft 5 in)
9	Nadia Centoni	Opposite	1981	185 m (606 ft 11 in)	68 kg (150 lb)	315 m (1,033 ft 6 in)	238 m (780 ft 10 in)
11	Cristina Chirichella	Middle-blocker	1994	195 m (639 ft 9 in)	76 kg (168 lb)	320 m (1,049 ft 10 in)	250 m (820 ft 3 in)
12	Stefania Sansonna	Libero	1982	175 m (574 ft 2 in)	67 kg (148 lb)	285 m (935 ft 0 in)	220 m (721 ft 9 in)
13	Valentina Arrighetti	Middle-blocker	1985	184 m (603 ft 8 in)	71 kg (157 lb)	318 m (1,043 ft 4 in)	240 m (787 ft 5 in)
14	Eleonora Lo Bianco	Setter	1979	171 m (561 ft 0 in)	65 kg (143 lb)	285 m (935 ft 0 in)	220 m (721 ft 9 in)
15	Antonella Del Core	Outside-spiker	1980	182 m (597 ft 1 in)	70 kg (150 lb)	310 m (1,017 ft 1 in)	230 m (754 ft 7 in)
16	Lucia Bosetti	Outside-spiker	1989	175 m (574 ft 2 in)	61 kg (134 lb)	318 m (1,043 ft 4 in)	224 m (734 ft 11 in)
17	Valentina Diouf	Opposite	1993	202 m (662 ft 9 in)	93 kg (205 lb)	330 m (1,082 ft 8 in)	255 m (836 ft 7 in)
19	Valentina Tirozzi	Outside-spiker	1986	180 m (590 ft 7 in)	68 kg (150 lb)	305 m (1,000 ft 8 in)	225 m (738 ft 2 in)

=== Netherlands ===
- Head Coach: Giovanni Guidetti

Players
#	Name	Position	Birth Year	Height	Weight	Spike	Block
1	Kirsten Knip	Libero	1992	176 m (577 ft 5 in)	73 kg (161 lb)	281 m (921 ft 11 in)	275 m (902 ft 3 in)
2	Femke Stoltenborg	Setter	1991	190 m (623 ft 4 in)	81 kg (179 lb)	303 m (994 ft 1 in)	299 m (981 ft 0 in)
3	Yvon Belien	Middle-blocker	1993	188 m (616 ft 10 in)	73 kg (161 lb)	307 m (1,007 ft 3 in)	303 m (994 ft 1 in)
4	Celeste Plak	Outside-spiker	1995	190 m (623 ft 4 in)	84 kg (185 lb)	314 m (1,030 ft 2 in)	302 m (990 ft 10 in)
5	Robin de Kruijf	Middle-blocker	1991	193 m (633 ft 2 in)	79 kg (174 lb)	313 m (1,026 ft 11 in)	300 m (984 ft 3 in)
6	Maret Balkestein-Grothues	Outside-spiker	1988	180 m (590 ft 7 in)	68 kg (150 lb)	304 m (997 ft 5 in)	285 m (935 ft 0 in)
7	Quinta Steenbergen	Middle-blocker	1985	189 m (620 ft 1 in)	74 kg (163 lb)	309 m (1,013 ft 9 in)	300 m (984 ft 3 in)
8	Judith Pietersen	Outside-spiker	1989	188 m (616 ft 10 in)	73 kg (161 lb)	306 m (1,003 ft 11 in)	296 m (971 ft 2 in)
9	Myrthe Schoot	Libero	1988	184 m (603 ft 8 in)	69 kg (152 lb)	298 m (977 ft 8 in)	286 m (938 ft 4 in)
10	Lonneke Slöetjes	Opposite	1990	192 m (629 ft 11 in)	76 kg (168 lb)	322 m (1,056 ft 5 in)	315 m (1,033 ft 6 in)
11	Anne Buijs	Outside-spiker	1991	191 m (626 ft 8 in)	75 kg (165 lb)	317 m (1,040 ft 0 in)	299 m (981 ft 0 in)
12	Manon Nummerdor-Flier	Opposite	1984	192 m (629 ft 11 in)	70 kg (150 lb)	315 m (1,033 ft 6 in)	301 m (987 ft 6 in)
14	Laura Dijkema	Setter	1990	184 m (603 ft 8 in)	70 kg (150 lb)	297 m (974 ft 5 in)	279 m (915 ft 4 in)
16	Debby Stam-Pilon	Libero	1984	184 m (603 ft 8 in)	68 kg (150 lb)	203 m (666 ft 0 in)	281 m (921 ft 11 in)

=== Poland ===
- Head Coach: Jacek Nawrocki

Players
#	Name	Position	Birth Year	Height	Weight	Spike	Block
1	Anna Werblinska	Outside-spiker	1984	178 m (584 ft 0 in)	69 kg (152 lb)	306 m (1,003 ft 11 in)	295 m (967 ft 10 in)
3	Zuzanna Efimienko	Middle-blocker	1989	196 m (643 ft 1 in)	78 kg (172 lb)	325 m (1,066 ft 3 in)	305 m (1,000 ft 8 in)
4	Izabela Belcik	Setter	1980	186 m (610 ft 3 in)	70 kg (150 lb)	305 m (1,000 ft 8 in)	292 m (958 ft 0 in)
5	Anna Grejman	Outside-spiker	1993	183 m (600 ft 5 in)	63 kg (139 lb)	308 m (1,010 ft 6 in)	293 m (961 ft 3 in)
6	Agnieszka Bednarek-Kasza	Middle-blocker	1986	185 m (606 ft 11 in)	69 kg (152 lb)	310 m (1,017 ft 1 in)	295 m (967 ft 10 in)
10	Agata Durajczyk	Libero	1989	170 m (557 ft 9 in)	63 kg (139 lb)	280 m (918 ft 8 in)	260 m (853 ft 0 in)
11	Sylwia Pycia	Middle-blocker	1981	190 m (623 ft 4 in)	78 kg (172 lb)	307 m (1,007 ft 3 in)	299 m (981 ft 0 in)
12	Izabela Kowalinska	Opposite	1985	189 m (620 ft 1 in)	84 kg (185 lb)	312 m (1,023 ft 7 in)	291 m (954 ft 9 in)
13	Paulina Maj-Erwardt	Libero	1987	166 m (544 ft 7 in)	58 kg (128 lb)	300 m (984 ft 3 in)	280 m (918 ft 8 in)
14	Joanna Wołosz	Setter	1990	181 m (593 ft 10 in)	66 kg (146 lb)	303 m (994 ft 1 in)	280 m (918 ft 8 in)
15	Natalia Kurnikowska	Outside-spiker	1992	184 m (603 ft 8 in)	70 kg (150 lb)	305 m (1,000 ft 8 in)	290 m (951 ft 5 in)
16	Klaudia Kaczorowska	Outside-spiker	1988	183 m (600 ft 5 in)	68 kg (150 lb)	307 m (1,007 ft 3 in)	281 m (921 ft 11 in)
17	Katarzyna Skowrońska-Dolata	Opposite	1983	189 m (620 ft 1 in)	75 kg (165 lb)	314 m (1,030 ft 2 in)	296 m (971 ft 2 in)
18	Kamila Ganszczyk	Middle-blocker	1991	191 m (626 ft 8 in)	77 kg (170 lb)	315 m (1,033 ft 6 in)	305 m (1,000 ft 8 in)

=== Slovenia ===
- Head Coach: Bruno Najdic

Players
#	Name	Position	Birth Year	Height	Weight	Spike	Block
1	Eva Mori	Setter	1996	188 m (616 ft 10 in)	70 kg (150 lb)	285 m (935 ft 0 in)	270 m (885 ft 10 in)
2	Sara Hutinski	Middle-blocker	1991	188 m (616 ft 10 in)	75 kg (165 lb)	300 m (984 ft 3 in)	282 m (925 ft 2 in)
3	Mojca Bozic	Setter	1992	176 m (577 ft 5 in)	71 kg (157 lb)	278 m (912 ft 1 in)	262 m (859 ft 7 in)
6	Katja Medved	Libero	1986	162 m (531 ft 6 in)	55 kg (121 lb)	264 m (866 ft 2 in)	251 m (823 ft 6 in)
8	Anja Zdovc	Outside-spiker	1987	183 m (600 ft 5 in)	70 kg (150 lb)	290 m (951 ft 5 in)	274 m (898 ft 11 in)
9	Iza Mlakar	Opposite	1995	183 m (600 ft 5 in)	69 kg (152 lb)	299 m (981 ft 0 in)	274 m (898 ft 11 in)
11	Ziva Recek	Outside-spiker	1993	182 m (597 ft 1 in)	69 kg (152 lb)	288 m (944 ft 11 in)	268 m (879 ft 3 in)
13	Sara Najdić	Setter	1994	170 m (557 ft 9 in)	57 kg (126 lb)	270 m (885 ft 10 in)	252 m (826 ft 9 in)
14	Lana Scuka	Outside-spiker	1996	186 m (610 ft 3 in)	71 kg (157 lb)	286 m (938 ft 4 in)	268 m (879 ft 3 in)
15	Marina Cvetanovic	Opposite	1986	188 m (616 ft 10 in)	76 kg (168 lb)	295 m (967 ft 10 in)	280 m (918 ft 8 in)
16	Monika Potokar	Outside-spiker	1987	177 m (580 ft 9 in)	66 kg (146 lb)	280 m (918 ft 8 in)	261 m (856 ft 4 in)
18	Saša Planinšec	Middle-blocker	1995	180 m (590 ft 7 in)	65 kg (143 lb)	288 m (944 ft 11 in)	269 m (882 ft 7 in)
19	Valentina Zaloznik	Middle-blocker	1992	190 m (623 ft 4 in)	63 kg (139 lb)	300 m (984 ft 3 in)	281 m (921 ft 11 in)
20	Anita Sobočan	Outside-spiker	1997	175 m (574 ft 2 in)	60 kg (130 lb)	287 m (941 ft 7 in)	260 m (853 ft 0 in)

== Pool B ==
=== Azerbaijan ===
- Head Coach: Bülent Karslioglu

Players
#	Name	Position	Birth Year	Height	Weight	Spike	Block
1	Jeyran Aliyeva	Libero	1995	165 m (541 ft 4 in)	51 kg (112 lb)	250 m (820 ft 3 in)	242 m (794 ft 0 in)
2	Kseniya Poznyak	Middle-blocker	1986	190 m (623 ft 4 in)	86 kg (190 lb)	310 m (1,017 ft 1 in)	286 m (938 ft 4 in)
4	Oksana Kurt	Setter	1984	184 m (603 ft 8 in)	80 kg (180 lb)	295 m (967 ft 10 in)	286 m (938 ft 4 in)
5	Odina Bayramova	Outside-spiker	1990	186 m (610 ft 3 in)	88 kg (194 lb)	315 m (1,033 ft 6 in)	295 m (967 ft 10 in)
6	Ayshan Abdulazimova	Middle-blocker	1993	184 m (603 ft 8 in)	66 kg (146 lb)	292 m (958 ft 0 in)	280 m (918 ft 8 in)
11	Katerina Zhidkova	Outside-spiker	1989	187 m (613 ft 6 in)	68 kg (150 lb)	298 m (977 ft 8 in)	285 m (935 ft 0 in)
12	Valeriya Mammadova	Libero	1984	174 m (570 ft 10 in)	65 kg (143 lb)	286 m (938 ft 4 in)	272 m (892 ft 5 in)
14	Krystsina Yagubova	Setter	1996	184 m (603 ft 8 in)	69 kg (152 lb)	295 m (967 ft 10 in)	285 m (935 ft 0 in)
15	Aynur Karimova	Libero	1988	168 m (551 ft 2 in)	62 kg (137 lb)	250 m (820 ft 3 in)	242 m (794 ft 0 in)
16	Oksana Kiselyova	Libero	1992	176 m (577 ft 5 in)	64 kg (141 lb)	280 m (918 ft 8 in)	275 m (902 ft 3 in)
17	Polina Rahimova	Opposite	1990	198 m (649 ft 7 in)	87 kg (192 lb)	318 m (1,043 ft 4 in)	302 m (990 ft 10 in)
20	Margarita Stepanenko	Opposite	1993	186 m (610 ft 3 in)	73 kg (161 lb)	308 m (1,010 ft 6 in)	289 m (948 ft 2 in)

=== Belgium ===
- Head Coach: Gert Vande Broek

Players
#	Name	Position	Birth Year	Height	Weight	Spike	Block
2	Jasmien Biebauw	Setter	1990	180 m (590 ft 7 in)	81 kg (179 lb)	295 m (967 ft 10 in)	274 m (898 ft 11 in)
3	Frauke Dirickx	Setter	1980	185 m (606 ft 11 in)	74 kg (163 lb)	305 m (1,000 ft 8 in)	302 m (990 ft 10 in)
4	Valerie Courtois	Libero	1990	171 m (561 ft 0 in)	67 kg (148 lb)	280 m (918 ft 8 in)	270 m (885 ft 10 in)
5	Laura Heyrman	Middle-blocker	1993	186 m (610 ft 3 in)	74 kg (163 lb)	310 m (1,017 ft 1 in)	280 m (918 ft 8 in)
6	Charlotte Leys	Outside-spiker	1989	186 m (610 ft 3 in)	77 kg (170 lb)	305 m (1,000 ft 8 in)	293 m (961 ft 3 in)
8	Kaja Grobelna	Opposite	1995	188 m (616 ft 10 in)	71 kg (157 lb)	318 m (1,043 ft 4 in)	289 m (948 ft 2 in)
9	Freya Aelbrecht	Middle-blocker	1990	186 m (610 ft 3 in)	82 kg (181 lb)	308 m (1,010 ft 6 in)	310 m (1,017 ft 1 in)
10	Lise Van Hecke	Opposite	1992	185 m (606 ft 11 in)	79 kg (174 lb)	299 m (981 ft 0 in)	281 m (921 ft 11 in)
11	Els Vandesteene	Outside-spiker	1987	186 m (610 ft 3 in)	74 kg (163 lb)	308 m (1,010 ft 6 in)	291 m (954 ft 9 in)
15	Lorena Cianci	Outside-spiker	1994	174 m (570 ft 10 in)	59 kg (130 lb)	293 m (961 ft 3 in)	280 m (918 ft 8 in)
16	Celine Van Gestel	Outside-spiker	1997	183 m (600 ft 5 in)	70 kg (150 lb)	310 m (1,017 ft 1 in)	280 m (918 ft 8 in)
17	Ilka Van de Vyver	Setter	1993	179 m (587 ft 3 in)	79 kg (174 lb)	296 m (971 ft 2 in)	273 m (895 ft 8 in)
18	Britt Ruysschaert	Libero	1994	174 m (570 ft 10 in)	60 kg (130 lb)	302 m (990 ft 10 in)	281 m (921 ft 11 in)
20	Maud Catry	Middle-blocker	1990	189 m (620 ft 1 in)	78 kg (172 lb)	307 m (1,007 ft 3 in)	302 m (990 ft 10 in)

=== Hungary ===
- Head Coach: Jan José De Brandt

Players
#	Name	Position	Birth Year	Height	Weight	Spike	Block
1	Gréta Szakmáry	Outside-spiker	1991	185 m (606 ft 11 in)	75 kg (165 lb)	295 m (967 ft 10 in)	280 m (918 ft 8 in)
2	Zsanett Kötél	Setter	1986	174 m (570 ft 10 in)	70 kg (150 lb)	280 m (918 ft 8 in)	265 m (869 ft 5 in)
6	Evelin Vacsi	Middle-blocker	1993	177 m (580 ft 9 in)	68 kg (150 lb)	280 m (918 ft 8 in)	270 m (885 ft 10 in)
7	Renáta Sándor	Outside-spiker	1990	182 m (597 ft 1 in)	72 kg (159 lb)	302 m (990 ft 10 in)	290 m (951 ft 5 in)
8	Zsuzsanna Tálas	Setter	1993	174 m (570 ft 10 in)	66 kg (146 lb)	285 m (935 ft 0 in)	270 m (885 ft 10 in)
9	Vivien Lévai	Libero	1992	164 m (538 ft 1 in)	57 kg (126 lb)	270 m (885 ft 10 in)	260 m (853 ft 0 in)
12	Dora Kötél	Libero	1988	175 m (574 ft 2 in)	61 kg (134 lb)	285 m (935 ft 0 in)	270 m (885 ft 10 in)
13	Petra Széles	Middle-blocker	1988	176 m (577 ft 5 in)	67 kg (148 lb)	300 m (984 ft 3 in)	285 m (935 ft 0 in)
14	Edina Dobi	Middle-blocker	1987	190 m (623 ft 4 in)	70 kg (150 lb)	301 m (987 ft 6 in)	290 m (951 ft 5 in)
15	Rita Liliom	Outside-spiker	1986	184 m (603 ft 8 in)	73 kg (161 lb)	305 m (1,000 ft 8 in)	290 m (951 ft 5 in)
16	Agnes Pallag	Outside-spiker	1993	178 m (584 ft 0 in)	69 kg (152 lb)	290 m (951 ft 5 in)	275 m (902 ft 3 in)
18	Dóra Horváth	Outside-spiker	1988	187 m (613 ft 6 in)	78 kg (172 lb)	305 m (1,000 ft 8 in)	295 m (967 ft 10 in)
19	Szandra Szombathelyi	Outside-spiker	1989	179 m (587 ft 3 in)	69 kg (152 lb)	290 m (951 ft 5 in)	275 m (902 ft 3 in)

=== Turkey ===
- Head Coach: Ferhat Akbaş

Players
#	Name	Position	Birth Year	Height	Weight	Spike	Block
1	Nilay Özdemir	Setter	1985	179 m (587 ft 3 in)	67 kg (148 lb)	286 m (938 ft 4 in)	280 m (918 ft 8 in)
2	Gözde Kırdar	Outside-spiker	1985	183 m (600 ft 5 in)	72 kg (159 lb)	297 m (974 ft 5 in)	243 m (797 ft 3 in)
3	Gizem Karadayı	Libero	1987	178 m (584 ft 0 in)	60 kg (130 lb)	285 m (935 ft 0 in)	235 m (771 ft 0 in)
4	Merve Dalbeler	Libero	1987	180 m (590 ft 7 in)	73 kg (161 lb)	295 m (967 ft 10 in)	282 m (925 ft 2 in)
5	Kübra Akman	Middle-blocker	1994	197 m (646 ft 4 in)	89 kg (196 lb)	300 m (984 ft 3 in)	270 m (885 ft 10 in)
6	Polen Uslupehlivan	Outside-spiker	1990	192 m (629 ft 11 in)	72 kg (159 lb)	300 m (984 ft 3 in)	262 m (859 ft 7 in)
7	Meliha İsmailoğlu	Outside-spiker	1993	189 m (620 ft 1 in)	60 kg (130 lb)	297 m (974 ft 5 in)	277 m (908 ft 10 in)
9	Büşra Kilicli	Middle-blocker	1990	188 m (616 ft 10 in)	84 kg (185 lb)	313 m (1,026 ft 11 in)	305 m (1,000 ft 8 in)
10	Güldeniz Önal	Outside-spiker	1986	182 m (597 ft 1 in)	75 kg (165 lb)	290 m (951 ft 5 in)	240 m (787 ft 5 in)
11	Naz Aydemir	Setter	1990	186 m (610 ft 3 in)	75 kg (165 lb)	290 m (951 ft 5 in)	249 m (816 ft 11 in)
12	Gözde Yılmaz	Outside-spiker	1991	195 m (639 ft 9 in)	82 kg (181 lb)	315 m (1,033 ft 6 in)	312 m (1,023 ft 7 in)
13	Neriman Özsoy	Outside-spiker	1988	188 m (616 ft 10 in)	76 kg (168 lb)	291 m (954 ft 9 in)	310 m (1,017 ft 1 in)
14	Eda Erdem Dündar	Middle-blocker	1987	188 m (616 ft 10 in)	73 kg (161 lb)	311 m (1,020 ft 4 in)	305 m (1,000 ft 8 in)
19	Hande Baladın	Opposite	1997	189 m (620 ft 1 in)	71 kg (157 lb)	295 m (967 ft 10 in)	293 m (961 ft 3 in)

== Pool C ==
=== Bulgaria ===
- Head Coach: Dragan Nešić

Players
#	Name	Position	Birth Year	Height	Weight	Spike	Block
2	Desislava Nikolova	Outside-spiker	1991	180 m (590 ft 7 in)	72 kg (159 lb)	290 m (951 ft 5 in)	285 m (935 ft 0 in)
3	Nasya Dimitrova	Middle-blocker	1992	189 m (620 ft 1 in)	70 kg (150 lb)	305 m (1,000 ft 8 in)	299 m (981 ft 0 in)
4	Lora Kitipova	Setter	1991	182 m (597 ft 1 in)	63 kg (139 lb)	299 m (981 ft 0 in)	288 m (944 ft 11 in)
5	Dobriana Rabadzhieva	Outside-spiker	1991	190 m (623 ft 4 in)	72 kg (159 lb)	304 m (997 ft 5 in)	293 m (961 ft 3 in)
7	Gabriela Koeva	Middle-blocker	1989	185 m (606 ft 11 in)	66 kg (146 lb)	297 m (974 ft 5 in)	293 m (961 ft 3 in)
8	Eva Yaneva	Outside-spiker	1985	186 m (610 ft 3 in)	75 kg (165 lb)	298 m (977 ft 8 in)	290 m (951 ft 5 in)
9	Petya Barakova	Setter	1994	178 m (584 ft 0 in)	75 kg (165 lb)	280 m (918 ft 8 in)	265 m (869 ft 5 in)
11	Hristina Ruseva	Middle-blocker	1991	190 m (623 ft 4 in)	77 kg (170 lb)	305 m (1,000 ft 8 in)	290 m (951 ft 5 in)
13	Mariya Filipova	Libero	1982	179 m (587 ft 3 in)	67 kg (148 lb)	289 m (948 ft 2 in)	280 m (918 ft 8 in)
14	Silvana Chausheva	Opposite	1995	188 m (616 ft 10 in)	74 kg (163 lb)	305 m (1,000 ft 8 in)	290 m (951 ft 5 in)
16	Elitsa Vasileva	Outside-spiker	1990	190 m (623 ft 4 in)	73 kg (161 lb)	303 m (994 ft 1 in)	295 m (967 ft 10 in)
18	Emiliya Nikolova	Opposite	1991	185 m (606 ft 11 in)	59 kg (130 lb)	297 m (974 ft 5 in)	280 m (918 ft 8 in)
20	Mira Todorova	Middle-blocker	1994	187 m (613 ft 6 in)	69 kg (152 lb)	308 m (1,010 ft 6 in)	300 m (984 ft 3 in)
22	Yuliya Stoyanova	Outside-spiker	1985	185 m (606 ft 11 in)	65 kg (143 lb)	300 m (984 ft 3 in)	290 m (951 ft 5 in)

=== Belarus ===
- Head Coach: Petr Khilko

Players
#	Name	Position	Birth Year	Height	Weight	Spike	Block
1	Aksana Kavalchuk	Opposite	1979	186 m (610 ft 3 in)	78 kg (172 lb)	310 m (1,017 ft 1 in)	295 m (967 ft 10 in)
2	Viktoryia Hurava	Setter	1984	182 m (597 ft 1 in)	74 kg (163 lb)	294 m (964 ft 7 in)	285 m (935 ft 0 in)
3	Nadzeya Malasai	Outside-spiker	1990	180 m (590 ft 7 in)	70 kg (150 lb)	300 m (984 ft 3 in)	290 m (951 ft 5 in)
4	Hanna Kalinouskaya-Guengoer	Middle-blocker	1985	190 m (623 ft 4 in)	75 kg (165 lb)	318 m (1,043 ft 4 in)	305 m (1,000 ft 8 in)
5	Vera Klimovich	Middle-blocker	1988	185 m (606 ft 11 in)	76 kg (168 lb)	300 m (984 ft 3 in)	295 m (967 ft 10 in)
6	Anastasiya Harelik	Outside-spiker	1991	184 m (603 ft 8 in)	74 kg (163 lb)	300 m (984 ft 3 in)	290 m (951 ft 5 in)
10	Volha Pauliukouskaya	Libero	1988	174 m (570 ft 10 in)	63 kg (139 lb)	280 m (918 ft 8 in)	275 m (902 ft 3 in)
11	Maryna Paulava	Outside-spiker	1989	180 m (590 ft 7 in)	65 kg (143 lb)	295 m (967 ft 10 in)	290 m (951 ft 5 in)
12	Hanna Kapko	Setter	1988	173 m (567 ft 7 in)	68 kg (150 lb)	280 m (918 ft 8 in)	275 m (902 ft 3 in)
13	Darya Ionava	Middle-blocker	1989	186 m (610 ft 3 in)	76 kg (168 lb)	295 m (967 ft 10 in)	290 m (951 ft 5 in)
14	Alena Fedarynchyk	Libero	1993	178 m (584 ft 0 in)	65 kg (143 lb)	290 m (951 ft 5 in)	285 m (935 ft 0 in)
15	Tatsiana Markevich	Outside-spiker	1988	185 m (606 ft 11 in)	64 kg (141 lb)	295 m (967 ft 10 in)	290 m (951 ft 5 in)
16	Anzhelika Barysevich	Middle-blocker	1995	194 m (636 ft 6 in)	87 kg (192 lb)	310 m (1,017 ft 1 in)	305 m (1,000 ft 8 in)
17	Kristina Mikhailenko	Opposite	1992	187 m (613 ft 6 in)	78 kg (172 lb)	300 m (984 ft 3 in)	295 m (967 ft 10 in)

=== Croatia ===
- Head Coach: Angelo Vercesi

Players
#	Name	Position	Birth Year	Height	Weight	Spike	Block
1	Senna Ušić-Jogunica	Outside-spiker	1986	188 m (616 ft 10 in)	76 kg (168 lb)	320 m (1,049 ft 10 in)	303 m (994 ft 1 in)
2	Ana Grbac	Setter	1988	186 m (610 ft 3 in)	82 kg (181 lb)	302 m (990 ft 10 in)	288 m (944 ft 11 in)
3	Nikolina Božičević	Libero	1995	167 m (547 ft 11 in)	56 kg (123 lb)	287 m (941 ft 7 in)	255 m (836 ft 7 in)
6	Mira Topić	Outside-spiker	1983	189 m (620 ft 1 in)	75 kg (165 lb)	322 m (1,056 ft 5 in)	303 m (994 ft 1 in)
7	Bernarda Ćutuk	Middle-blocker	1990	188 m (616 ft 10 in)	80 kg (180 lb)	317 m (1,040 ft 0 in)	300 m (984 ft 3 in)
9	Maja Burazer	Opposite	1988	188 m (616 ft 10 in)	75 kg (165 lb)	315 m (1,033 ft 6 in)	301 m (987 ft 6 in)
10	Ivana Miloš	Middle-blocker	1986	188 m (616 ft 10 in)	71 kg (157 lb)	322 m (1,056 ft 5 in)	305 m (1,000 ft 8 in)
11	Katarina Barun-Šušnjar	Opposite	1983	192 m (629 ft 11 in)	78 kg (172 lb)	320 m (1,049 ft 10 in)	304 m (997 ft 5 in)
13	Samanta Fabris	Middle-blocker	1992	190 m (623 ft 4 in)	80 kg (180 lb)	322 m (1,056 ft 5 in)	306 m (1,003 ft 11 in)
14	Karla Klarić	Outside-spiker	1994	189 m (620 ft 1 in)	80 kg (180 lb)	317 m (1,040 ft 0 in)	302 m (990 ft 10 in)
15	Bernarda Brčić	Setter	1991	190 m (623 ft 4 in)	78 kg (172 lb)	310 m (1,017 ft 1 in)	295 m (967 ft 10 in)
18	Maja Poljak	Middle-blocker	1983	192 m (629 ft 11 in)	82 kg (181 lb)	325 m (1,066 ft 3 in)	305 m (1,000 ft 8 in)

=== Russia ===
- Head Coach: Yuri Marichev

Players
#	Name	Position	Birth Year	Height	Weight	Spike	Block
1	Yana Shcherban	Outside-spiker	1989	185 m (606 ft 11 in)	71 kg (157 lb)	298 m (977 ft 8 in)	294 m (964 ft 7 in)
2	Victoria Kuzyakina	Libero	1985	175 m (574 ft 2 in)	70 kg (150 lb)	290 m (951 ft 5 in)	287 m (941 ft 7 in)
5	Aleksandra Pasynkova	Outside-spiker	1987	190 m (623 ft 4 in)	75 kg (165 lb)	313 m (1,026 ft 11 in)	305 m (1,000 ft 8 in)
7	Ekaterina Lyubushkina	Middle-blocker	1990	188 m (616 ft 10 in)	81 kg (179 lb)	305 m (1,000 ft 8 in)	301 m (987 ft 6 in)
8	Nataliya Obmochaeva	Opposite	1989	194 m (636 ft 6 in)	77 kg (170 lb)	315 m (1,033 ft 6 in)	306 m (1,003 ft 11 in)
10	Ekaterina Kosianenko	Setter	1990	178 m (584 ft 0 in)	64 kg (141 lb)	290 m (951 ft 5 in)	285 m (935 ft 0 in)
12	Ekaterina Orlova	Middle-blocker	1987	193 m (633 ft 2 in)	77 kg (170 lb)	307 m (1,007 ft 3 in)	301 m (987 ft 6 in)
13	Evgeniya Startseva	Setter	1989	185 m (606 ft 11 in)	68 kg (150 lb)	294 m (964 ft 7 in)	290 m (951 ft 5 in)
14	Irina Fetisova	Middle-blocker	1994	190 m (623 ft 4 in)	76 kg (168 lb)	307 m (1,007 ft 3 in)	286 m (938 ft 4 in)
15	Tatiana Kosheleva	Outside-spiker	1988	191 m (626 ft 8 in)	67 kg (148 lb)	315 m (1,033 ft 6 in)	305 m (1,000 ft 8 in)
16	Irina Zaryazhko	Middle-blocker	1991	196 m (643 ft 1 in)	78 kg (172 lb)	305 m (1,000 ft 8 in)	290 m (951 ft 5 in)
17	Natalia Malykh	Opposite	1993	187 m (613 ft 6 in)	65 kg (143 lb)	308 m (1,010 ft 6 in)	297 m (974 ft 5 in)
18	Kseniia Ilchenko	Outside-spiker	1994	183 m (600 ft 5 in)	64 kg (141 lb)	300 m (984 ft 3 in)	286 m (938 ft 4 in)
19	Anna Malova	Libero	1990	175 m (574 ft 2 in)	59 kg (130 lb)	290 m (951 ft 5 in)	284 m (931 ft 9 in)

== Pool D ==
=== Czech Republic ===
- Head Coach: Carlo Parisi

Players
#	Name	Position	Birth Year	Height	Weight	Spike	Block
1	Andrea Kossanyiová	Outside-spiker	1993	185 m (606 ft 11 in)	72 kg (159 lb)	310 m (1,017 ft 1 in)	300 m (984 ft 3 in)
2	Eva Hodanová	Outside-spiker	1993	189 m (620 ft 1 in)	75 kg (165 lb)	306 m (1,003 ft 11 in)	298 m (977 ft 8 in)
3	Veronika Trnková	Middle-blocker	1995	184 m (603 ft 8 in)	90 kg (200 lb)	302 m (990 ft 10 in)	299 m (981 ft 0 in)
4	Aneta Havlíčková	Opposite	1987	191 m (626 ft 8 in)	96 kg (212 lb)	316 m (1,036 ft 9 in)	300 m (984 ft 3 in)
5	Julie Kovářová	Libero	1987	178 m (584 ft 0 in)	64 kg (141 lb)	290 m (951 ft 5 in)	279 m (915 ft 4 in)
6	Lucie Smutná	Setter	1991	181 m (593 ft 10 in)	75 kg (165 lb)	307 m (1,007 ft 3 in)	285 m (935 ft 0 in)
8	Barbora Purchartová	Middle-blocker	1992	189 m (620 ft 1 in)	85 kg (187 lb)	309 m (1,013 ft 9 in)	300 m (984 ft 3 in)
11	Veronika Dostálová	Libero	1992	170 m (557 ft 9 in)	67 kg (148 lb)	278 m (912 ft 1 in)	269 m (882 ft 7 in)
12	Michaela Mlejnková	Outside-spiker	1996	184 m (603 ft 8 in)	70 kg (150 lb)	305 m (1,000 ft 8 in)	298 m (977 ft 8 in)
13	Tereza Vanžurová	Opposite	1991	184 m (603 ft 8 in)	76 kg (168 lb)	300 m (984 ft 3 in)	290 m (951 ft 5 in)
14	Nikol Sajdová	Middle-blocker	1988	185 m (606 ft 11 in)	79 kg (174 lb)	298 m (977 ft 8 in)	295 m (967 ft 10 in)
16	Helena Havelková	Outside-spiker	1988	186 m (610 ft 3 in)	70 kg (150 lb)	320 m (1,049 ft 10 in)	305 m (1,000 ft 8 in)
18	Pavla Vincourová	Setter	1992	180 m (590 ft 7 in)	68 kg (150 lb)	297 m (974 ft 5 in)	290 m (951 ft 5 in)
20	Marie Toufarová	Outside-spiker	1992	183 m (600 ft 5 in)	70 kg (150 lb)	307 m (1,007 ft 3 in)	294 m (964 ft 7 in)

=== Germany ===
- Head Coach: Luciano Pedulla

Players
#	Name	Position	Birth Year	Height	Weight	Spike	Block
1	Lenka Dürr	Libero	1990	171 m (561 ft 0 in)	59 kg (130 lb)	280 m (918 ft 8 in)	270 m (885 ft 10 in)
2	Kathleen Weiß	Setter	1984	171 m (561 ft 0 in)	66 kg (146 lb)	290 m (951 ft 5 in)	273 m (895 ft 8 in)
4	Maren Brinker	Outside-spiker	1986	184 m (603 ft 8 in)	64 kg (141 lb)	303 m (994 ft 1 in)	295 m (967 ft 10 in)
6	Jennifer Geerties	Outside-spiker	1994	184 m (603 ft 8 in)	58 kg (128 lb)	298 m (977 ft 8 in)	288 m (944 ft 11 in)
7	Jennifer Pettke	Middle-blocker	1989	187 m (613 ft 6 in)	71 kg (157 lb)	302 m (990 ft 10 in)	290 m (951 ft 5 in)
8	Berit Kauffeldt	Middle-blocker	1990	190 m (623 ft 4 in)	75 kg (165 lb)	308 m (1,010 ft 6 in)	294 m (964 ft 7 in)
10	Lena Stigrot	Outside-spiker	1994	184 m (603 ft 8 in)	68 kg (150 lb)	303 m (994 ft 1 in)	295 m (967 ft 10 in)
12	Heike Beier	Outside-spiker	1983	184 m (603 ft 8 in)	73 kg (161 lb)	305 m (1,000 ft 8 in)	293 m (961 ft 3 in)
14	Margareta Kozuch	Outside-spiker	1986	187 m (613 ft 6 in)	70 kg (150 lb)	309 m (1,013 ft 9 in)	297 m (974 ft 5 in)
15	Lisa Thomsen	Libero	1985	172 m (564 ft 4 in)	68 kg (150 lb)	290 m (951 ft 5 in)	285 m (935 ft 0 in)
16	Anja Brandt	Middle-blocker	1990	195 m (639 ft 9 in)	77 kg (170 lb)	312 m (1,023 ft 7 in)	295 m (967 ft 10 in)
18	Wiebke Silge	Middle-blocker	1996	190 m (623 ft 4 in)	75 kg (165 lb)	302 m (990 ft 10 in)	291 m (954 ft 9 in)
19	Laura Weihenmaier	Outside-spiker	1991	180 m (590 ft 7 in)	70 kg (150 lb)	297 m (974 ft 5 in)	286 m (938 ft 4 in)
20	Mareen Apitz	Setter	1987	183 m (600 ft 5 in)	73 kg (161 lb)	295 m (967 ft 10 in)	284 m (931 ft 9 in)

=== Romania ===
- Head Coach: Guillermo Gallardo

No.	Name	Date of birth	2015 club
1	Ioana Baciu	4 January 1990	(Romania) CS Știința Bacău
2	Denisa Rogojinaru	16 May 1985	(Romania) CS Știința Bacău
3	Roxana Iosef	19 August 1988	(Romania) CSM Bucarest
4	Ana-Maria Berdilă	8 August 1993	(Romania) Penicilina Iași
5	Andreea Ispas	5 March 1990	(Romania) CSU Târgu Mureș
6	Mihaela Albu	1 January 1994	(Romania) CS Știința Bacău
8	Florina Chirilov	28 March 1988	(Romania) SCMU Craiova
10	Alexandra Sobo	25 April 1987	(Romania) CS Știința Bacău
11	Ioana Nemțanu	1 January 1989	(Romania) CSV Alba-Blaj
12	Adina Salaoru	5 August 1989	(Romania) CSV Alba-Blaj
13	Sabina Miclea	4 December 1990	(Romania) CS Știința Bacău
15	Georgiana Fales	4 February 1986	(Romania) CSM Bucarest
18	Nneka Onyejekwe	18 August 1989	(France) RC Cannes

=== Serbia ===
Head coach: Zoran Terzić

№	Name	Date of birth	Height	Weight	Spike	Block	2015 club
3	Bianka Buša	25 July 1994	1.87 m (6 ft 2 in)	74 kg (163 lb)	293 cm (115 in)	282 cm (111 in)	(Serbia) Vizura Beograd
4	Bojana Živković	29 March 1988	1.85 m (6 ft 1 in)	70 kg (150 lb)	292 cm (115 in)	284 cm (112 in)	(Turkey) Iller Bankasi Ankara
5	Mina Popović	16 September 1994	1.87 m (6 ft 2 in)	73 kg (161 lb)	315 cm (124 in)	305 cm (120 in)	(Serbia) Crvena Zvezda
6	Tijana Malešević	18 March 1991	1.84 m (6 ft 0 in)	73 kg (161 lb)	289 cm (114 in)	288 cm (113 in)	(Czech Republic) VK Prostějov
9	Brankica Mihajlović	13 April 1991	1.89 m (6 ft 2 in)	64 kg (141 lb)	282 cm (111 in)	264 cm (104 in)	(Japan) Hisamitsu Springs
10	Maja Ognjenović (C)	6 August 1984	1.83 m (6 ft 0 in)	68 kg (150 lb)	290 cm (110 in)	270 cm (110 in)	(Poland) Chemik Police
11	Stefana Veljković	9 January 1990	1.90 m (6 ft 3 in)	76 kg (168 lb)	320 cm (130 in)	305 cm (120 in)	(Poland) Chemik Police
12	Jelena Nikolić	13 April 1982	1.94 m (6 ft 4 in)	79 kg (174 lb)	315 cm (124 in)	310 cm (120 in)	(Azerbaijan) Azerrail Baku
13	Ana Bjelica	3 April 1992	1.90 m (6 ft 3 in)	78 kg (172 lb)	310 cm (120 in)	305 cm (120 in)	(Poland) Chemik Police
15	Jovana Stevanović	30 June 1992	1.92 m (6 ft 4 in)	72 kg (159 lb)	308 cm (121 in)	295 cm (116 in)	(Italy) Pomi Casalmaggiore
16	Milena Rašić	25 October 1990	1.93 m (6 ft 4 in)	75 kg (165 lb)	303 cm (119 in)	293 cm (115 in)	(Turkey) VakifBank Istanbul
17	Silvija Popović (L)	15 March 1986	1.78 m (5 ft 10 in)	65 kg (143 lb)	236 cm (93 in)	226 cm (89 in)	(Switzerland) Voléro Zürich
18	Suzana Ćebić (L)	11 September 1984	1.67 m (5 ft 6 in)	60 kg (130 lb)	279 cm (110 in)	255 cm (100 in)	(Romania) CSM Târgoviște
19	Tijana Bošković	8 March 1997	1.91 m (6 ft 3 in)	71 kg (157 lb)	303 cm (119 in)	295 cm (116 in)	(Serbia) Vizura Beograd
