= Dora Kötél =

Hungarian volleyball player (born 1988)

Dóra Kötél

Personal information
- Nationality: Hungarian
- Born: 16 May 1988 (age 38)
- Height: 175 cm (69 in)
- Weight: 61 kg (134 lb)
- Spike: 285 cm (112 in)
- Block: 270 cm (106 in)

Volleyball information
- Position: Libero
- Number: 12 (national team)

Career
Years	Teams
2015	ELTE Budapest

National team
2015	Hungary

Dóra Kötél (born 16 May 1988) is a Hungarian female volleyball player, playing as a libero. She is part of the Hungary women's national volleyball team.

She competed at the 2015 Women's European Volleyball Championship. On club level she plays for ELTE Budapest.
