= Gigantes de Carolina (women's volleyball) squads =

This article shows past squads from the Puerto Rican professional volleyball team Gigantes de Carolina from the Liga de Voleibol Superior Femenino.

== 2010 ==
- Head Coach: (Puerto Rico) Arcángel Ruíz
- Assistant coach: (Puerto Rico) Felipe Ralat

Number	Player	Position
1	(Puerto Rico) Daniela Bertrán	Wing Spiker
2	(Puerto Rico) Lourdes Isern	Libero
3	(Puerto Rico) Xaimara Colón	Libero
4	(Puerto Rico) Tatiana Encarnación	Wing Spiker
5	(Puerto Rico) Carolina García	Wing Spiker
7	(Puerto Rico) Madeline Gonzalez	Setter
9	(Puerto Rico) Monica Morales	Middle Blocker
10	(Dominican Republic) Karla Echenique	Setter
11	(United States) Jessica Jones	Middle Blocker
12	(United States) Lilly Denoon	Middle Blocker
13	(Puerto Rico) Grace Salado	Middle Blocker/Opposite
14	(United States) Kaitlin Sather	Opposite

=== Release or Transfer ===
Number	Player	Position
14	(United States) Katie Olsovsky	Wing Spiker
5	(Puerto Rico) Vanessa Vélez	Wing Spiker

== 2009 ==
- Head Coach: (Puerto Rico) Javier Gaspar
- Assistant coach: (Puerto Rico) Angel Peña

Number	Player	Position
2	(Puerto Rico) Grace Salado	Middle Blocker
3	(Puerto Rico) Xaimara Colón	Libero
5	(Puerto Rico) Angie Lastra	Libero
6	(Puerto Rico) Jessenia Resto	Wing Spiker
7	(Cuba) Yasary Castrodad	Middle Blocker
8	(United States) Rachel Hartmann	Setter
9	(United States) Kylie Atherstone	Opposite
10	(Puerto Rico) Yarleen Santiago	Wing Spiker
12	(United States) Diane Copenhagen	Wing Spiker
13	(Puerto Rico) Monica Morales	Opposite
15	(United States) Erica Short	Middle Blocker
17	(Puerto Rico) Geraldy Miranda	Setter

=== Release or Transfer ===
Number	Player	Position
1	(Hungary) Rita Liliom	Wing Spiker
1	(United States) Nicole Fawcett	Wing Spiker

== 2007 ==
- Head Coach: (Puerto Rico) Luis E. Ruiz
- Assistant coach: (Puerto Rico) Steven Fenosic

Number	Player	Position
1	(Puerto Rico) Suheil Medina	Setter
3	(Puerto Rico) Xaimara Colón	Libero
4	(Puerto Rico) Tatiana Encarnación	Wing Spiker
7	(Cuba) Yasary Castrodad	Middle Blocker
8	(United States) Michelle Piantadosi	Wing Spiker/Opposite
9	(Puerto Rico) Miosotys Santiago	Libero
10	(Puerto Rico) María Teresa Ramos	Wing Spiker
11	(Puerto Rico) Glorimar Ortega	Setter
12	(United States) Lilly Denoon	Middle Blocker
13	(Puerto Rico) Monica Morales	Opposite
17	(Puerto Rico) Loany Torres	Wing Spiker

=== Release or Transfer ===
Number	Player	Position
	(United States) Amy Morris	Wing Spiker
15	(Puerto Rico) Leyre Santaella	Wing Spiker
16	(United States) Ashley Pederson	Wing Spiker
