= Anastasiya Harelik =

Belarusian volleyball player (born 1991)

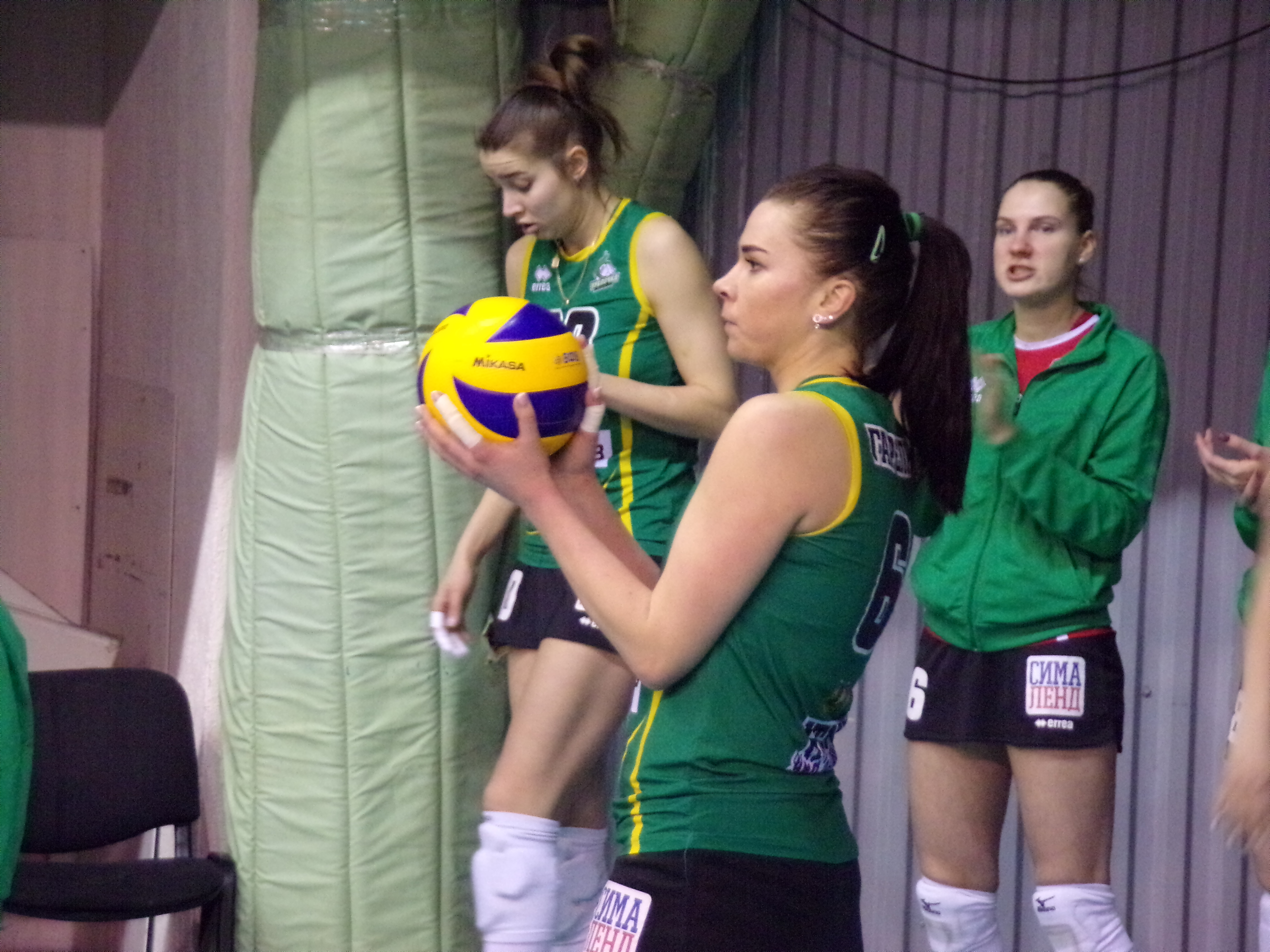

Personal information
- Nationality: Belarusian
- Born: 20 March 1991 (age 35)
- Height: 184 cm (72 in)
- Weight: 74 kg (163 lb)
- Spike: 300 cm (118 in)
- Block: 290 cm (114 in)

Volleyball information
- Position: Outside-spiker
- Number: 6 (national team)

Career
Years	Teams
2017-2018	Uralochka-NTMK

National team
2011-2015	Belarus

Anastasiya Harelik (born 20 March 1991) is a Belarusian volleyball player, playing as an outside-spiker. She is part of the Belarus women's national volleyball team.

She competed at the 2011, 2013 and 2015 Women's European Volleyball Championship. On club level she plays for CS Știința Bacău.
