= Alena Fedarynchyk =

Belarusian volleyball player (born 1993)

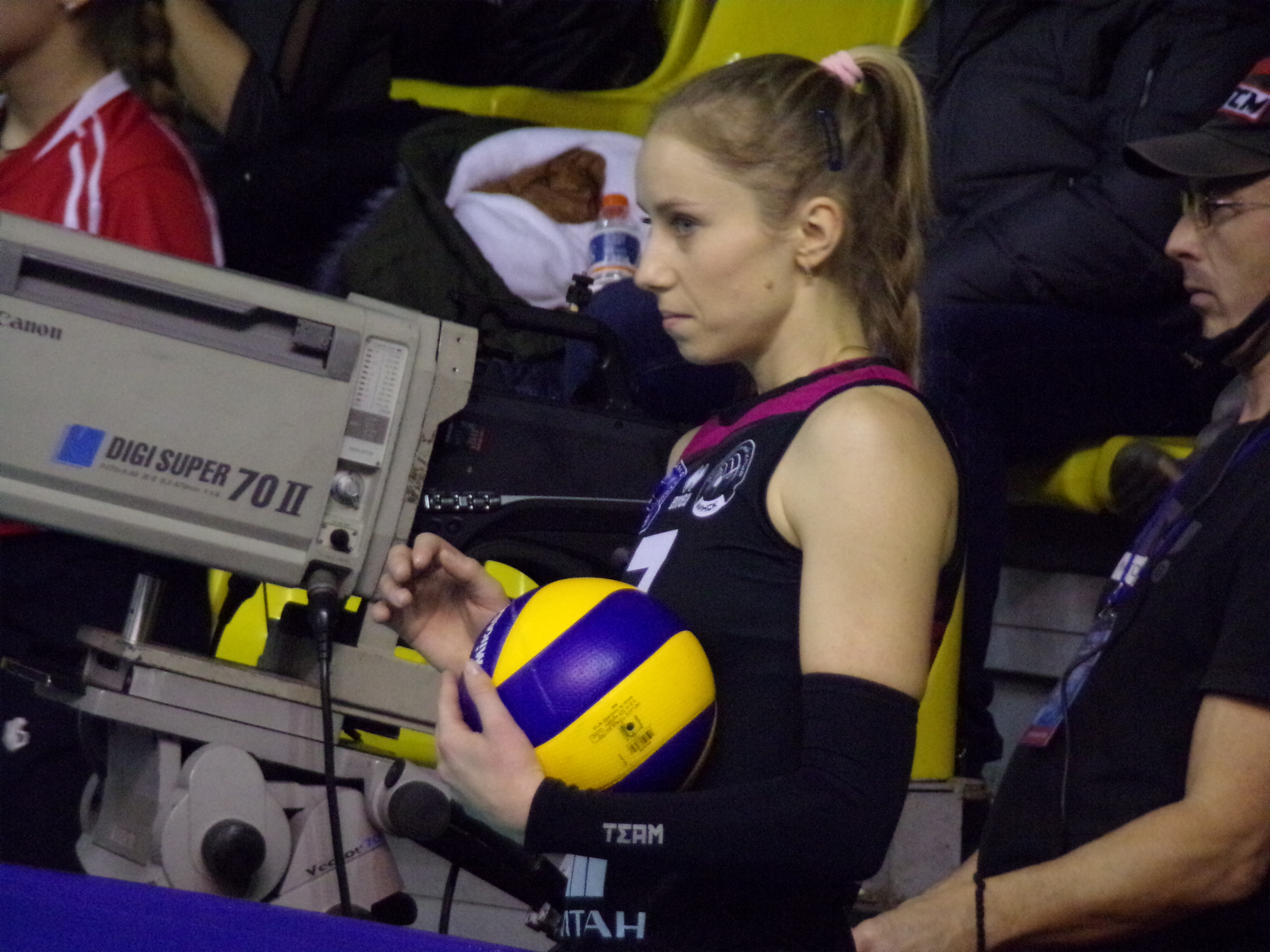

Personal information
- Nationality: Belarusian
- Born: 3 July 1993 (age 33)
- Height: 178 cm (70 in)
- Weight: 65 kg (143 lb)
- Spike: 290 cm (114 in)
- Block: 285 cm (112 in)

Volleyball information
- Position: Libero
- Number: 14 (national team)

National team
2015	Belarus

Alena Fedarynchyk (née Burak, born 3 July 1993) is a Belarusian volleyball player, playing as a libero. She is part of the Belarus women's national volleyball team.

She competed at the 2015 Women's European Volleyball Championship.
