= Jan De Brandt =

Belgian volleyball player and coach

Personal information
- Full name: Jan José De Brandt
- Born: 20 January 1959 (age 67); Belgium

Coaching information
- Current team: Fenerbahçe
Previous teams coached
Years	Teams
2001–05; 2005–07; 2007–08; 2008–10; 2010–11; 2013; 2014; 2014–2017; 2014–2015; 2015; 2015–2016; 2016–2017; 2017–2018; 2023–	Datovoc Tongeren; Belgium Women's; CV Tenerife; Fenerbahçe Acıbadem; Igtisadchi Baku; Voléro Zürich; Datovoc Tongeren; Hungary women's Rote Raben Vilsbiburg; Zeta System Urbino; VDK Gent Dames; Bursa BBSK; Fenerbahçe; Nepal Women's

Medal record

Coach for Women's Volleyball

Fenerbahçe Acıbadem

Women's CEV Champions League
Silver medal – second place	Cannes 2010	Team

Women's CEV Top Teams Cup
Bronze medal – third place	Novara 2009	Team

Jan José De Brandt (born 20 January 1959) is a Belgian former volleyball player and current coach. He last coached for Fenerbahçe for 2017–18 season, before getting fired during playoffs. He also coached Fenerbahçe Acıbadem between mid of 2008–09 season to 2009–2010 season end, and led to win Women's Volleyball League and Volleyball Super Cup. He played volleyball between years 1967–1978 as a professional player and formerly coached CV Tenerife and Belgian national teams. He is married and has a son and a daughter who both also play volleyball. He speaks fluently Dutch, French, German and English.

== Honours ==
- Women's European Volleyball League:
  - Winner (1): 2015
- Women's CEV Champions League:
  - Second (1): 2009–10
- Women's CEV Top Teams Cup:
  - Third (1): 2008–09
- Turkish Women's Volleyball League:
  - Winners (2): 2008–09, 2009–10
- Turkish Cup:
  - Winner (1): 2009–10
- Turkish Super Cup:
  - Winner (1): 2009
