= Edina Dobi =

Hungarian volleyball player (born 1987)

Personal information
- Nationality: Hungarian
- Born: 22 October 1987 (age 39); Eger, Hungarian People's Republic
- Height: 190 cm (75 in)
- Weight: 70 kg (154 lb)
- Spike: 312 cm (123 in)
- Block: 300 cm (118 in)
- Education: University of New Orleans

Volleyball information
- Position: Middle-blocker
- Current club: Azeryol Baku
- Number: 14 (national team)

Career
Years	Teams
2015	Raben Vilsbiburg

National team
2015	Hungary

Edina Dobi (born 22 October 1987) is a Hungarian female volleyball player, playing as a middle-blocker. She is part of the Hungary women's national volleyball team.

She competed at the 2015 Women's European Volleyball Championship. On club level she plays for Raben Vilsbiburg.
