= Ágnes Pallag =

Hungarian volleyball player (born 1993)

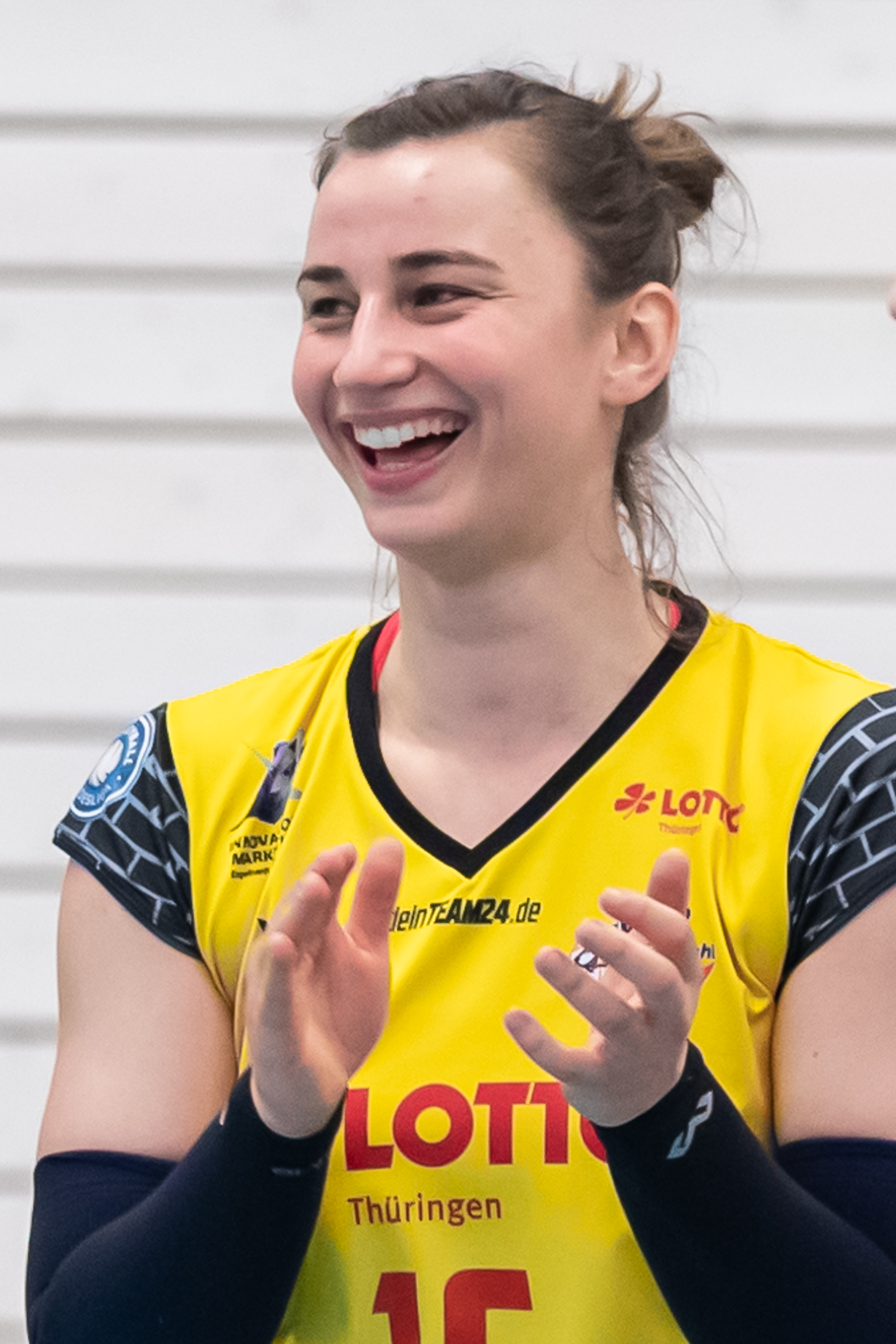

Personal information
- Nationality: Hungarian
- Born: 2 September 1993 (age 33)
- Height: 182 cm (6 ft 0 in)
- Weight: 74 kg (163 lb)
- Spike: 308 cm (121 in)
- Block: 275 cm (108 in)

Volleyball information
- Position: Outside-spiker

National team
- Years: Team
- 2015-: Hungary (85)

Ágnes Pallag (born 2 September 1993) is a Hungarian female volleyball player, playing as an outside-spiker. She is part of the Hungary women's national volleyball team.

She competed at the 2015 Women's European Volleyball Championship, and 2021 Women's European Volleyball Championship.

On club level she played for Békéscsabai Röplabda SE, Vandœuvre Nancy Volley-Ball, RC Cannes, and VfB Suhl Lotto Thüringen.
