= Vivien Lévai =

Hungarian volleyball player (born 1992)

Personal information
- Nationality: Hungarian
- Born: 12 May 1992 (age 34)
- Height: 164 cm (65 in)
- Weight: 57 kg (126 lb)
- Spike: 270 cm (106 in)
- Block: 260 cm (102 in)

Volleyball information
- Position: Libero
- Number: 9 (national team)

Career
- Years: Team
- 2015: Vasas SC Budapest

National team
- Years: Team
- 2015: Hungary

Vivien Lévai (born 12 May 1992) is a Hungarian female volleyball player, playing as a libero. She is part of the Hungary women's national volleyball team.

She competed at the 2015 Women's European Volleyball Championship. On club level she plays for Vasas SC Budapest.
