= Petra Széles =

Hungarian volleyball player (born 1988)

Personal information
- Nationality: Hungarian
- Born: 27 January 1988 (age 38)
- Height: 176 cm (69 in)
- Weight: 67 kg (148 lb)
- Spike: 300 cm (118 in)
- Block: 285 cm (112 in)

Volleyball information
- Position: Middle-blocker
- Number: 13 (national team)

Career
| Years | Teams |
|---|---|
| 2015 | Gödöllõ Clu |

National team
| 2015 | Hungary |

Petra Széles (born 27 January 1988) is a Hungarian female volleyball player, playing as a middle-blocker. She is part of the Hungary women's national volleyball team.

She competed at the 2015 Women's European Volleyball Championship. On club level she plays for Gödöllõ Clu.
