= Anzhelika Barysevich =

Belarusian volleyball player (born 1995)

Personal information
- Nationality: Belarusian
- Born: 20 July 1995 (age 31); Grodno, Belarus
- Height: 194 cm (76 in)
- Weight: 87 kg (192 lb)
- Spike: 310 cm (122 in)
- Block: 305 cm (120 in)

Volleyball information
- Position: Middle-blocker
- Number: 16 (national team)

Career
Years	Teams
2015	Minchanka Minsk

National team
2015	Belarus

Anzhelika Barysevich (born 20 July 1995) is a Belarusian volleyball player, playing as a middle-blocker. She is part of the Belarus women's national volleyball team.

She competed at the 2015 Women's European Volleyball Championship. On club level she plays for Minchanka Minsk.
