= Zsuzsanna Király-Tálas =

Hungarian volleyball player (born 1993)

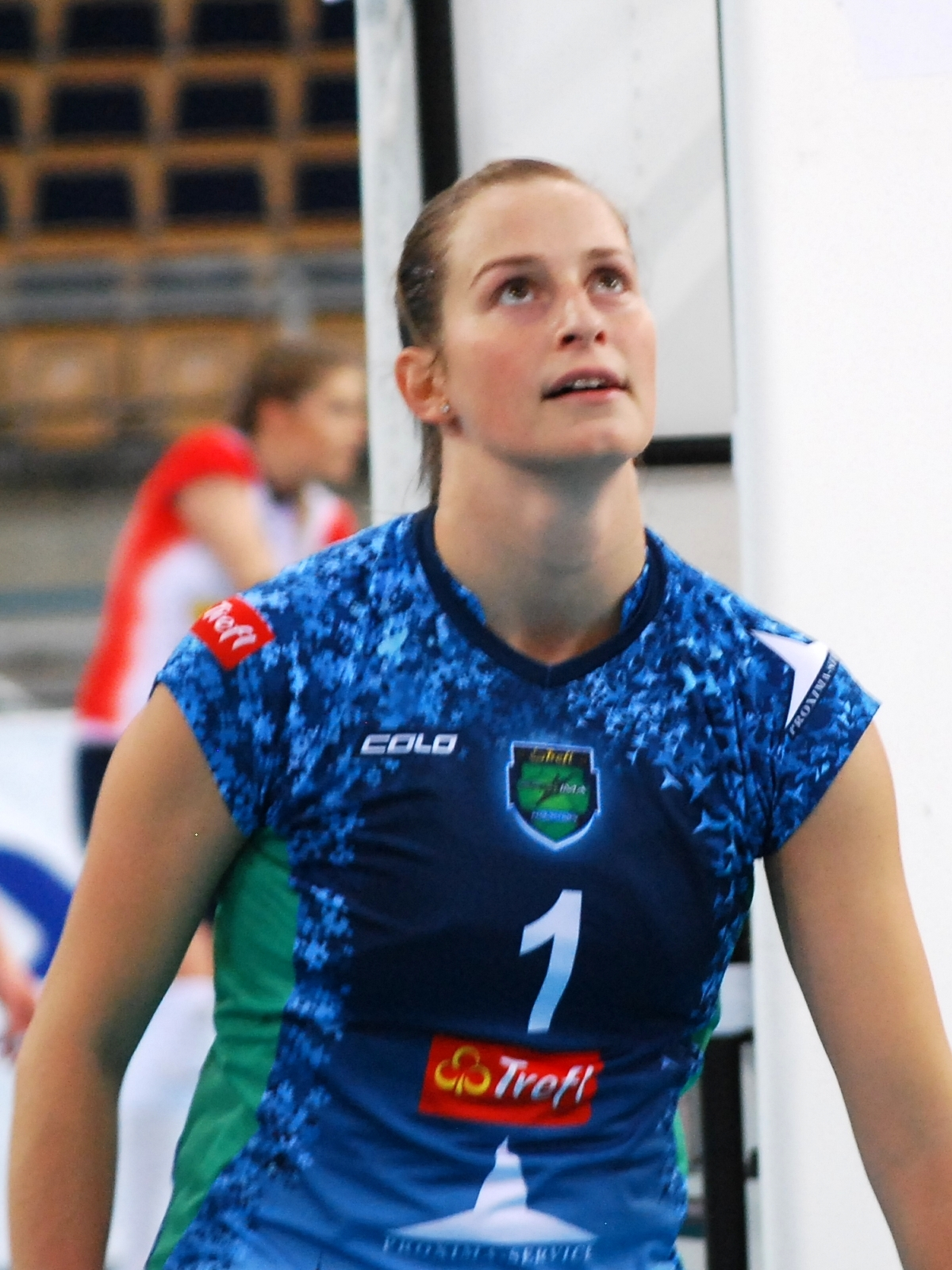

Personal information
- Nationality: Hungarian
- Born: Zsuzsanna Tálas; 9 July 1993 (age 33) Székesfehérvár, Hungary
- Height: 174 cm (69 in)
- Weight: 66 kg (146 lb)
- Spike: 285 cm (112 in)
- Block: 270 cm (106 in)

Volleyball information
- Position: Setter
- Current club: (Hungary) Linamar BRSE
- Number: 8 (national team)

Career
- Years: Team
- 2015: (Hungary) Vasas SC Budapest
- 2015-2017: (Hungary) BRSE Békéscsaba
- 2017-2018: (Poland) Trefl Proxima Kraków

National team
- Years: Team
- 2015: Hungary

Zsuzsanna Király-Tálas (born 9 July 1993) is a Hungarian female volleyball player, playing as a setter. She is part of the Hungary women's national volleyball team.

She competed at the 2015 Women's European Volleyball Championship. On club level she used to play

-2015: Vasas SC Budapest.

2015 - 2017: BRSE Békéscsaba

2017 - 2018 : Trefl Proxima Kraków

2018 - : Linamar BRSE Békéscsaba
