= Aksana Kavalchuk =

Belarusian volleyball player (born 1979)

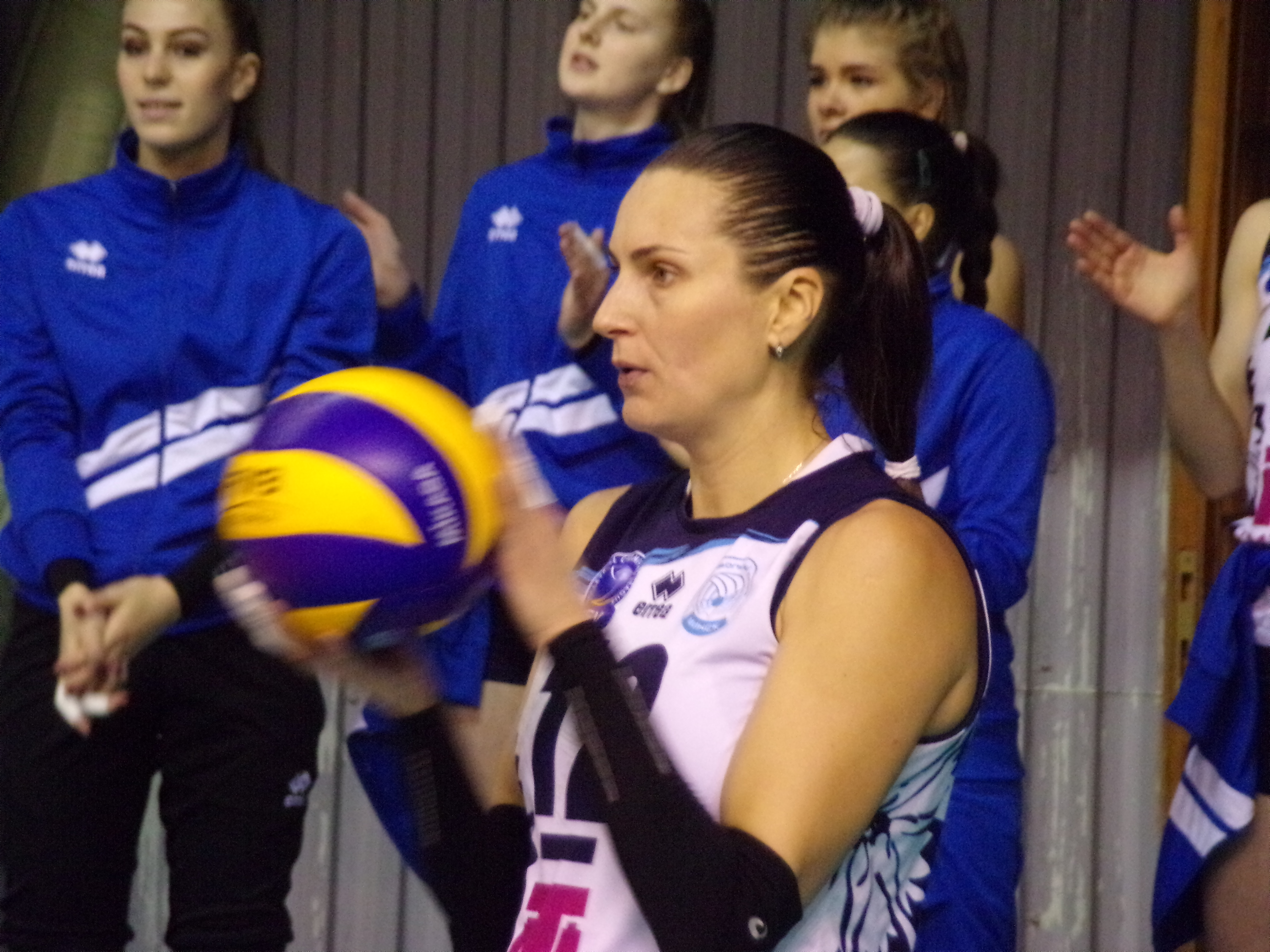

Personal information
- Full name: Aksana Alekseevna Kavalchuk
- Nationality: Belarusian
- Born: 23 November 1979 (age 46)
- Height: 186 cm (73 in)
- Weight: 78 kg (172 lb)
- Spike: 310 cm (122 in)
- Block: 295 cm (116 in)

Volleyball information
- Position: Opposite
- Number: 12 (national team)

Career
Years	Teams
2009	Indezit Lipeck

National team
2009	Belarus

Aksana Alekseevna Kavalchuk (born 23 November 1979) is a Belarusian former volleyball player, playing as an outside-spiker. She was part of the Belarus women's national volleyball team.

She competed at the 2009 Women's European Volleyball Championship. On club level she played for Indezit Lipeck in 2009. She competed in the 2015 Women's European Volleyball Championship.
