= Zsanett Kötél =

Hungarian volleyball player (born 1986)

Personal information
- Nationality: Hungarian
- Born: 15 July 1986 (age 40)
- Height: 174 cm (69 in)
- Weight: 70 kg (154 lb)
- Spike: 280 cm (110 in)
- Block: 265 cm (104 in)

Volleyball information
- Position: Setter
- Number: 2 (national team)

Career
- Years: Team
- 2015: Amiens Longueau

National team
- Years: Team
- 2015: Hungary

Zsanett Kötél (born 15 July 1986) is a Hungarian female volleyball player, playing as a setter. She is part of the Hungary women's national volleyball team.

She competed at the 2015 Women's European Volleyball Championship. On club level she plays for Amiens Longueau.
