= 2013 Women's European Volleyball League =

European volleyball tournament

Tournament details
- Host country: Bulgaria
- Dates: 13 June – 6 July (qualification); 13–14 July (final round)
- Teams: 8
- Venue: 1 (in 1 host city)

Final positions
- Champions: Germany (1st title)

Tournament awards
- MVP: (Belgium) Charlotte Leys

The 2013 Women's European Volleyball League was the fifth edition of the annual Women's European Volleyball League, which featured women's national volleyball teams from eight European countries. A preliminary league round was played from June 13 to July 6, and the final four tournament, which was held in Bulgaria on July 11–12, 2013.

For this years edition, the first four sets were played over 21 points.

Germany defeated Belgium 3–2 in the final.

== Teams ==
- Belgium
- Bulgaria
- Germany
- Hungary
- Israel
- Romania
- Serbia
- Turkey

== League round ==
=== Pool A ===
| Pos | Team | Pld | W | L | Pts | SW | SL | SR | SPW | SPL | SPR | Qualification |
|---|---|---|---|---|---|---|---|---|---|---|---|---|
| 1 | Bulgaria | 12 | 8 | 4 | 27 | 32 | 19 | 1.684 | 970 | 842 | 1.152 | Semifinals |
| 2 | Romania | 12 | 8 | 4 | 20 | 28 | 23 | 1.217 | 925 | 893 | 1.036 | Semifinals |
| 3 | Turkey | 12 | 6 | 6 | 16 | 23 | 26 | 0.885 | 883 | 889 | 0.993 | |
| 4 | Hungary | 12 | 2 | 10 | 9 | 16 | 31 | 0.516 | 760 | 914 | 0.832 | |

==== Leg 1 ====
The tournament was played at Cengiz Göllü Volleyball Hall, Bursa, Turkey.

| Date | Time | | Score | | Set 1 | Set 2 | Set 3 | Set 4 | Set 5 | Total | Report |
|---|---|---|---|---|---|---|---|---|---|---|---|
| 14 Jun | 15:30 | Romania | 3–2 | Bulgaria | 19–21 | 21–16 | 21–19 | 14–21 | 15–12 | 90–89 | Report |
| 14 Jun | 18:00 | Turkey | 3–2 | Hungary | 20–22 | 21–14 | 15–21 | 21–13 | 15–6 | 92–76 | Report |
| 15 Jun | 15:30 | Romania | 1–3 | Turkey | 11–21 | 19–21 | 21–14 | 10–21 | | 61–77 | Report |
| 15 Jun | 18:00 | Bulgaria | 3–0 | Hungary | 21–10 | 21–16 | 21–17 | | | 63–43 | Report |
| 16 Jun | 15:30 | Hungary | 3–1 | Romania | 21–18 | 21–17 | 13–21 | 21–17 | | 76–73 | Report |
| 16 Jun | 18:00 | Turkey | 3–2 | Bulgaria | 7–21 | 13–21 | 26–24 | 21–18 | 15–6 | 82–90 | Report |

==== Leg 2 ====
The tournament was played at Messzi István Sportcsarnok, Kecskemét, Hungary.

| Date | Time | | Score | | Set 1 | Set 2 | Set 3 | Set 4 | Set 5 | Total | Report |
|---|---|---|---|---|---|---|---|---|---|---|---|
| 21 Jun | 15:30 | Turkey | 0–3 | Romania | 15–21 | 18–21 | 16–21 | | | 49–63 | Report |
| 21 Jun | 18:00 | Hungary | 1–3 | Bulgaria | 11–21 | 25–23 | 15–21 | 7–21 | | 58–86 | Report |
| 22 Jun | 15:30 | Romania | 2–3 | Bulgaria | 21–18 | 15–21 | 22–24 | 21–15 | 11–15 | 90–93 | Report |
| 22 Jun | 18:00 | Hungary | 3–0 | Turkey | 21–17 | 21–16 | 21–16 | | | 63–49 | Report |
| 23 Jun | 15:30 | Bulgaria | 3–1 | Turkey | 12–21 | 21–15 | 21–17 | 21–14 | | 75–67 | Report |
| 23 Jun | 18:00 | Romania | 3–2 | Hungary | 19–21 | 21–15 | 17–21 | 21–11 | 15–10 | 93–78 | Report |

==== Leg 3 ====
The tournament was played in Sala Polivalentă Oltenia, Craiova, Romania.

| Date | Time | | Score | | Set 1 | Set 2 | Set 3 | Set 4 | Set 5 | Total | Report |
|---|---|---|---|---|---|---|---|---|---|---|---|
| 28 Jun | 17:00 | Bulgaria | 2–3 | Turkey | 21–19 | 21–13 | 18–21 | 15–21 | 10–15 | 85–89 | Report |
| 28 Jun | 19:30 | Romania | 3–0 | Hungary | 21–14 | 21–16 | 21–9 | | | 63–39 | Report |
| 29 Jun | 17:00 | Turkey | 3–1 | Hungary | 15–21 | 21–17 | 21–15 | 21–18 | | 78–71 | Report |
| 29 Jun | 19:30 | Bulgaria | 2–3 | Romania | 13–21 | 21–16 | 21–17 | 17–21 | 10–15 | 82–90 | Report |
| 30 Jun | 17:00 | Hungary | 1–3 | Bulgaria | 15–21 | 16–21 | 21–17 | 17–21 | | 69–80 | Report |
| 30 Jun | 19:30 | Romania | 3–1 | Turkey | 21–17 | 19–21 | 23–21 | 21–19 | | 84–78 | Report |

==== Leg 4 ====
The tournament was played in Palace of Culture and Sports, Varna, Bulgaria.

| Date | Time | | Score | | Set 1 | Set 2 | Set 3 | Set 4 | Set 5 | Total | Report |
|---|---|---|---|---|---|---|---|---|---|---|---|
| 4 Jul | 15:30 | Hungary | 0–3 | Turkey | 18–21 | 14–21 | 16–21 | | | 48–63 | Report |
| 4 Jul | 18:00 | Romania | 0–3 | Bulgaria | 11–21 | 9–21 | 15–21 | | | 35–63 | Report |
| 5 Jul | 15:30 | Turkey | 2–3 | Romania | 21–14 | 23–21 | 18–21 | 15–21 | 13–15 | 90–92 | Report |
| 5 Jul | 18:00 | Hungary | 1–3 | Bulgaria | 12–21 | 12–21 | 22–20 | 14–21 | | 60–83 | Report |
| 6 Jul | 15:30 | Romania | 3–2 | Hungary | 13–21 | 21–12 | 21–23 | 21–11 | 15–12 | 91–79 | Report |
| 6 Jul | 18:00 | Bulgaria | 3–1 | Turkey | 21–17 | 21–17 | 18–21 | 21–14 | | 81–69 | Report |

=== Pool B ===
| Pos | Team | Pld | W | L | Pts | SW | SL | SR | SPW | SPL | SPR | Qualification |
|---|---|---|---|---|---|---|---|---|---|---|---|---|
| 1 | Belgium | 12 | 10 | 2 | 29 | 32 | 11 | 2.909 | 843 | 701 | 1.203 | Semifinals |
| 2 | Germany | 12 | 8 | 4 | 26 | 30 | 17 | 1.765 | 898 | 772 | 1.163 | Semifinals |
| 3 | Serbia | 12 | 6 | 6 | 17 | 22 | 23 | 0.957 | 790 | 829 | 0.953 | |
| 4 | Israel | 12 | 0 | 12 | 0 | 3 | 36 | 0.083 | 583 | 812 | 0.718 | |

==== Leg 1 ====
The tournament was played at Sport Oase, Leuven, Belgium.

| Date | Time | | Score | | Set 1 | Set 2 | Set 3 | Set 4 | Set 5 | Total | Report |
|---|---|---|---|---|---|---|---|---|---|---|---|
| 14 Jun | 17:00 | Germany | 3–0 | Israel | 21–14 | 21–13 | 25–23 | | | 67–50 | Report |
| 14 Jun | 20:00 | Serbia | 1–3 | Belgium | 22–20 | 8–21 | 11–21 | 18–21 | | 59–83 | Report |
| 15 Jun | 17:00 | Israel | 0–3 | Serbia | 15–21 | 18–21 | 19–21 | | | 52–63 | Report |
| 15 Jun | 20:00 | Germany | 2–3 | Belgium | 21–15 | 17–21 | 19–21 | 21–16 | 9–15 | 87–88 | Report |
| 16 Jun | 15:00 | Serbia | 3–2 | Germany | 21–19 | 21–16 | 12–21 | 15–21 | 15–12 | 84–89 | Report |
| 16 Jun | 18:00 | Belgium | 3–0 | Israel | 21–6 | 21–12 | 22–20 | | | 64–38 | Report |

==== Leg 2 ====
The tournament was played at Hala Sportova "Dudova Suma", Subotica, Serbia.

| Date | Time | | Score | | Set 1 | Set 2 | Set 3 | Set 4 | Set 5 | Total | Report |
|---|---|---|---|---|---|---|---|---|---|---|---|
| 21 Jun | 17:30 | Israel | 0–3 | Germany | 13–21 | 10–21 | 16–21 | | | 39–63 | Report |
| 21 Jun | 20:15 | Belgium | 3–0 | Serbia | 21–12 | 22–20 | 21–18 | | | 64–50 | Report |
| 22 Jun | 17:30 | Germany | 0–3 | Belgium | 17–21 | 17–21 | 17–21 | | | 51–63 | Report |
| 22 Jun | 20:15 | Serbia | 3–0 | Israel | 21–18 | 24–22 | 21–15 | | | 66–55 | Report |
| 23 Jun | 17:30 | Belgium | 3–0 | Israel | 21–12 | 21–17 | 21–15 | | | 63–44 | Report |
| 23 Jun | 20:15 | Germany | 3–0 | Serbia | 21–7 | 21–16 | 21–9 | | | 63–32 | Report |

==== Leg 3 ====
The tournament was played in CU Arena, Hamburg, Germany.

| Date | Time | | Score | | Set 1 | Set 2 | Set 3 | Set 4 | Set 5 | Total | Report |
|---|---|---|---|---|---|---|---|---|---|---|---|
| 28 Jun | 17:00 | Belgium | 3–2 | Serbia | 21–18 | 18–21 | 18–21 | 21–14 | 15–13 | 93–87 | Report |
| 28 Jun | 20:00 | Israel | 1–3 | Germany | 12–21 | 11–21 | 21–17 | 16–21 | | 60–80 | Report |
| 29 Jun | 17:00 | Serbia | 3–0 | Israel | 21–16 | 21–14 | 21–12 | | | 63–42 | Report |
| 29 Jun | 20:00 | Germany | 3–2 | Belgium | 21–13 | 18–21 | 18–21 | 21–19 | 15–12 | 93–86 | Report |
| 30 Jun | 15:00 | Israel | 0–3 | Belgium | 13–21 | 10–21 | 15–21 | | | 38–63 | Report |
| 30 Jun | 18:00 | Germany | 3–1 | Serbia | 21–10 | 17–21 | 21–19 | 21–18 | | 80–68 | Report |

==== Leg 4 ====
The tournament was played in Metrowest Sport Palace, Ra'anana, Israel.

| Date | Time | | Score | | Set 1 | Set 2 | Set 3 | Set 4 | Set 5 | Total | Report |
|---|---|---|---|---|---|---|---|---|---|---|---|
| 4 Jul | 17:00 | Israel | 1–3 | Serbia | 21–14 | 12–21 | 16–21 | 12–21 | | 61–77 | Report |
| 4 Jul | 19:30 | Belgium | 0–3 | Germany | 15–21 | 14–21 | 19–21 | | | 48–63 | Report |
| 5 Jul | 17:00 | Serbia | 3–2 | Germany | 18–21 | 21–16 | 19–21 | 21–19 | 15–7 | 94–84 | Report |
| 5 Jul | 19:30 | Israel | 0–3 | Belgium | 21–23 | 16–21 | 7–21 | | | 44–65 | Report |
| 6 Jul | 17:00 | Serbia | 0–3 | Belgium | 12–21 | 16–21 | 19–21 | | | 47–63 | Report |
| 6 Jul | 19:30 | Germany | 3–1 | Israel | 21–11 | 21–15 | 15–21 | 21–13 | | 78–60 | Report |

== Final four ==
The final four was held in at the Palace of Culture and Sports in Varna, Bulgaria from July 13 to 14, 2013.

Qualified teams

- Belgium
- Bulgaria (host)
- Germany
- Romania

=== Bracket ===
Semi-finals
13 July
Belgium | 3
Romania | 0
13 July
Bulgaria | 0
Germany | 3

Final
14 July
Belgium | 2
Germany | 3
Third place
14 July
Romania | 0
Bulgaria | 3

=== Semifinals ===
| Date | Time | | Score | | Set 1 | Set 2 | Set 3 | Set 4 | Set 5 | Total | Report |
|---|---|---|---|---|---|---|---|---|---|---|---|
| 13 Jul | 14:00 | Belgium | 3–0 | Romania | 21–16 | 22–20 | 21–15 | | | 64–51 | Report |
| 13 Jul | 17:00 | Bulgaria | 0–3 | Germany | 17–21 | 10–21 | 19–21 | | | 46–63 | Report |

=== Third place game ===
| Date | Time | | Score | | Set 1 | Set 2 | Set 3 | Set 4 | Set 5 | Total | Report |
|---|---|---|---|---|---|---|---|---|---|---|---|
| 14 Jul | 15:00 | Romania | 0–3 | Bulgaria | 16–21 | 14–21 | 14–21 | | | 44–63 | Report |

=== Final ===
| Date | Time | | Score | | Set 1 | Set 2 | Set 3 | Set 4 | Set 5 | Total | Report |
|---|---|---|---|---|---|---|---|---|---|---|---|
| 14 Jul | 18:00 | Belgium | 2–3 | Germany | 21–14 | 16–21 | 21–15 | 14–21 | 7–15 | 79–86 | Report |

== Final standing ==
| Rank | Team |
|---|---|
| 1st place, gold medalist(s) | Germany |
| 2nd place, silver medalist(s) | Belgium |
| 3rd place, bronze medalist(s) | Bulgaria |
| 4 | Romania |
| 5 | Serbia |
| 6 | Turkey |
| 7 | Hungary |
| 8 | Israel |

== Awards ==
- MVP: (Belgium) Charlotte Leys
- Best scorer: (Germany) Margareta Kozuch
- Best spiker: (Germany) Margareta Kozuch
- Best blocker: (Belgium) Freya Aelbrecht
- Best server: (Germany) Denise Hanke
- Best setter: (Belgium) Frauke Dirickx
- Best receiver: (Bulgaria) Mariya Karakasheva
- Best libero: (Belgium) Valérie Courtois
