= 2015 Women's European Volleyball League =

European volleyball tournament

Tournament details
- Host country: None
- Dates: 30 July – 13 September
- Teams: 6
- Venues: 8 (in 8 host cities)

Final positions
- Champions: Hungary (1st title)

Tournament awards
- MVP: (Hungary) Renáta Sándor

The 2015 Women's European Volleyball League was the seventh edition of the annual Women's European Volleyball League and featured women's national volleyball teams from six European countries.

Hungary won their first title after defeating Turkey 15–13 in the golden set. Renáta Sándor from the winning team was named Most Valuable Player.

== Teams ==
- Georgia
- Greece
- Hungary
- Israel
- Poland
- Turkey

== Results ==
- All times are local.

=== Standings ===
Pos	Team	Pld	W	L	Pts	SW	SL	SR	SPW	SPL	SPR	Qualification
1	Turkey	10	8	2	25	27	7	3.857	828	625	1.325	Final round
2	Hungary	10	7	3	20	22	13	1.692	785	658	1.193	Final round
3	Greece	10	6	4	20	23	15	1.533	871	777	1.121	Final round
4	Israel	10	5	5	13	19	21	0.905	830	884	0.939	Final round
5	Poland	10	4	6	10	15	23	0.652	766	851	0.900	
6	Georgia	10	0	10	1	3	30	0.100	523	808	0.647	

=== Leg 1 ===
Date	Time		Score		Set 1	Set 2	Set 3	Set 4	Set 5	Total	Report
30 Jul	18:00	Greece	0–3	Turkey	22–25	23–25	21–25			66–75	Report
31 Jul	14:30	Israel	2–3	Poland	25–20	21–25	25–22	25–27	10–15	106–109	Report
31 Jul	18:00	Greece	3–1	Turkey	27–25	23–25	25–22	26–24		101–96	Report
1 Aug	17:00	Israel	3–0	Poland	25–23	25–23	25–19			75–65	Report
1 Aug	20:30	Hungary	3–0	Georgia	25–12	25–15	25–12			75–39	Report
2 Aug	18:30	Hungary	3–0	Georgia	25–11	25–12	25–11			75–34	Report

=== Leg 2 ===
Date	Time		Score		Set 1	Set 2	Set 3	Set 4	Set 5	Total	Report
7 Aug	18:00	Turkey	3–0	Hungary	25–14	25–14	25–21			75–49	Report
7 Aug	20:00	Poland	3–2	Greece	12–25	25–18	19–25	25–22	15–13	96–103	Report
8 Aug	17:00	Georgia	0–3	Israel	21–25	17–25	20–25			58–75	Report
8 Aug	18:00	Turkey	3–0	Hungary	26–24	25–15	25–10			76–49	Report
8 Aug	20:00	Poland	1–3	Greece	11–25	23–25	25–19	18–25		77–94	Report
9 Aug	17:00	Georgia	2–3	Israel	27–29	25–21	16–25	25–23	10–15	103–113	Report

=== Leg 3 ===
Date	Time		Score		Set 1	Set 2	Set 3	Set 4	Set 5	Total	Report
14 Aug	17:00	Israel	3–2	Turkey	21–25	25–22	20–25	25–23	15–13	106–108	Report
15 Aug	17:00	Georgia	0–3	Poland	22–25	19–25	22–25			63–75	Report
15 Aug	19:30	Israel	0–3	Turkey	14–25	21–25	22–25			57–75	Report
15 Aug	20:30	Hungary	1–3	Greece	25–21	19–25	23–25	21–25		88–96	Report
16 Aug	17:00	Georgia	1–3	Poland	14–25	23–25	25–20	10–25		72–95	Report
16 Aug	18:30	Hungary	3–1	Greece	25–15	25–17	22–25	26–24		98–81	Report

=== Leg 4 ===
Date	Time		Score		Set 1	Set 2	Set 3	Set 4	Set 5	Total	Report
21 Aug	19:00	Greece	3–0	Georgia	25–12	25–16	25–11			75–39	Report
22 Aug	19:00	Turkey	3–0	Poland	25–19	25–13	25–18			75–50	Report
22 Aug	20:30	Hungary	3–0	Israel	25–16	25–11	25–15			75–42	Report
22 Aug	18:00	Greece	3–0	Georgia	25–14	25–17	25–9			75–40	Report
23 Aug	18:30	Hungary	3–2	Israel	25–15	21–25	25–14	25–27	15–7	111–88	Report
23 Aug	19:00	Turkey	3–1	Poland	25–21	23–25	25–12	25–14		98–72	Report

=== Leg 5 ===
Date	Time		Score		Set 1	Set 2	Set 3	Set 4	Set 5	Total	Report
28 Aug	17:00	Israel	0–3	Greece	20–25	20–25	20–25			60–75	Report
28 Aug	20:00	Poland	0–3	Hungary	13–25	21–25	18–25			52–75	Report
29 Aug	19:00	Turkey	3–0	Georgia	25–8	25–14	25–17			75–39	Report
29 Aug	19:30	Israel	3–2	Greece	25–21	23–25	26–24	19–25	15–10	108–105	Report
29 Aug	20:00	Poland	1–3	Hungary	19–25	25–15	13–25	18–25		75–90	Report
30 Aug	19:00	Turkey	3–0	Georgia	25–13	25–11	25–12			75–36	Report

== Final round ==
- All times are local.

Semifinals
1	Turkey	3	3	6
4	Israel	0	0	0
3	Greece	2	1	1
2	Hungary	3	3	5

Final
Turkey	0	3	3 (13)
Hungary	3	1	3 (15)

=== Semifinals ===
Date	Time		Score		Set 1	Set 2	Set 3	Set 4	Set 5	Total	Report
3 Sep	19:00	Israel	0–3	Turkey	15–25	18–25	20–25			53–75	Report
3 Sep	19:00	Greece	2–3	Hungary	24–26	19–25	25–22	25–23	11–15	104–111	Report
6 Sep	19:00	Turkey	3–0	Israel	25–10	25–21	25–19			75–50	Report
6 Sep	18:30	Hungary	3–1	Greece	22–25	25–19	25–11	25–17		97–72	Report

=== Final ===
Date	Time		Score		Set 1	Set 2	Set 3	Set 4	Set 5	Total	Report
10 Sep	18:30	Hungary	3–0	Turkey	25–23	25–23	25–21			75–67	Report
13 Sep	18:00	Turkey	3–1	Hungary	23–25	25–21	25–21	25–18		98–85	Report

== Final standings ==
Rank	Team
1st place, gold medalist(s)	Hungary
2nd place, silver medalist(s)	Turkey
3rd place, bronze medalist(s)	Greece
3rd place, bronze medalist(s)	Israel
5	Poland
6	Georgia

2015 Women's European League winners

Hungary
First title

== Awards ==
- MVP: (Hungary) Renáta Sándor
