= Yuliya Stoyanova =

Bulgarian volleyball player (born 1985)

Personal information
- Nationality: Bulgaria
- Born: 22 July 1985 (age 41)
- Education: University of Tennessee
- Height: 1.85 m (6 ft 1 in)
- Weight: 64 kg (141 lb)
- Spike: 305 cm (120 in)
- Block: 298 cm (117 in)

Volleyball information
- Current club: Vandoeuvre Nancy

Yuliya Plamenova Stoyanova (Bulgarian: Юлия Стоянова, born 22 July 1985) is a Bulgarian female volleyball player, playing as an outside-spiker. She is part of the Bulgaria women's national volleyball team. She competed at the 2015 Women's European Volleyball Championship, 2015 FIVB World Grand Prix, and 2017 FIVB World Grand Prix.

On the University level she played for University of Tennessee.

== Clubs ==
- France Istres Ouest Provence Volley-Ball 2014-2015
- France Vandoeuvre Nancy 2016 - 2017
