= Szandra Szombathelyi =

Hungarian volleyball player (born 1989)

Personal information
- Nationality: Hungarian
- Born: 2 August 1989 (age 37)
- Height: 179 cm (70 in)
- Weight: 69 kg (152 lb)
- Spike: 290 cm (114 in)
- Block: 275 cm (108 in)

Volleyball information
- Position: Outside-spiker
- Number: 19 (national team)

Career
Years	Teams
2015	Vasas SC Budapest

National team
2015	Hungary

Szandra Szombathelyi (born 2 August 1989) is a Hungarian female volleyball player, playing as an outside-spiker. She is part of the Hungary women's national volleyball team.

She competed at the 2015 Women's European Volleyball Championship. On club level she plays for Vasas SC Budapest.
