= Mojca Božič =

Slovenian volleyball player (born 1992)

Personal information
- Nationality: Slovenian
- Born: 30 March 1992 (age 34); Celje, SFR Yugoslavia
- Height: 1.86 m (6 ft 1 in)
- Weight: 71 kg (157 lb)
- Spike: 310 cm (122 in)
- Block: 300 cm (118 in)

Volleyball information
- Position: setter

Career
Years	Teams
2016–2017	OK Kamnik

National team
Slovenia

Mojca Božič (born 30 March 1992) is a Slovenian volleyball player, playing as a middle blocker. She is part of the Slovenia women's national volleyball team.

She competed at the 2015 Women's European Volleyball Championship. At club level, she plays for OK Kamnik.
