= Evelin Vacsi =

Hungarian volleyball player (born 1993)

Personal information
- Nationality: Hungarian
- Born: 28 October 1993 (age 33); Mór, Fejér County, Hungary
- Height: 177 cm (70 in)
- Weight: 66 kg (146 lb)
- Spike: 296 cm (117 in)
- Block: 286 cm (113 in)

Volleyball information
- Position: Middle-blocker
- Current club: Fatum-Nyíregyháza
- Number: 6 (national team)

Career
Years	Teams
2012-2016	Vasas SC

National team
2014-	Hungary

Evelin Vacsi (born 28 October 1993) is a Hungarian female volleyball player, playing as a middle-blocker. She is part of the Hungary women's national volleyball team.

She competed at the 2015 Women's European Volleyball Championship. On club level she plays for Fatum-Nyíregyháza.
