= Kamila Ganszczyk =

Polish volleyball player (born 1991)

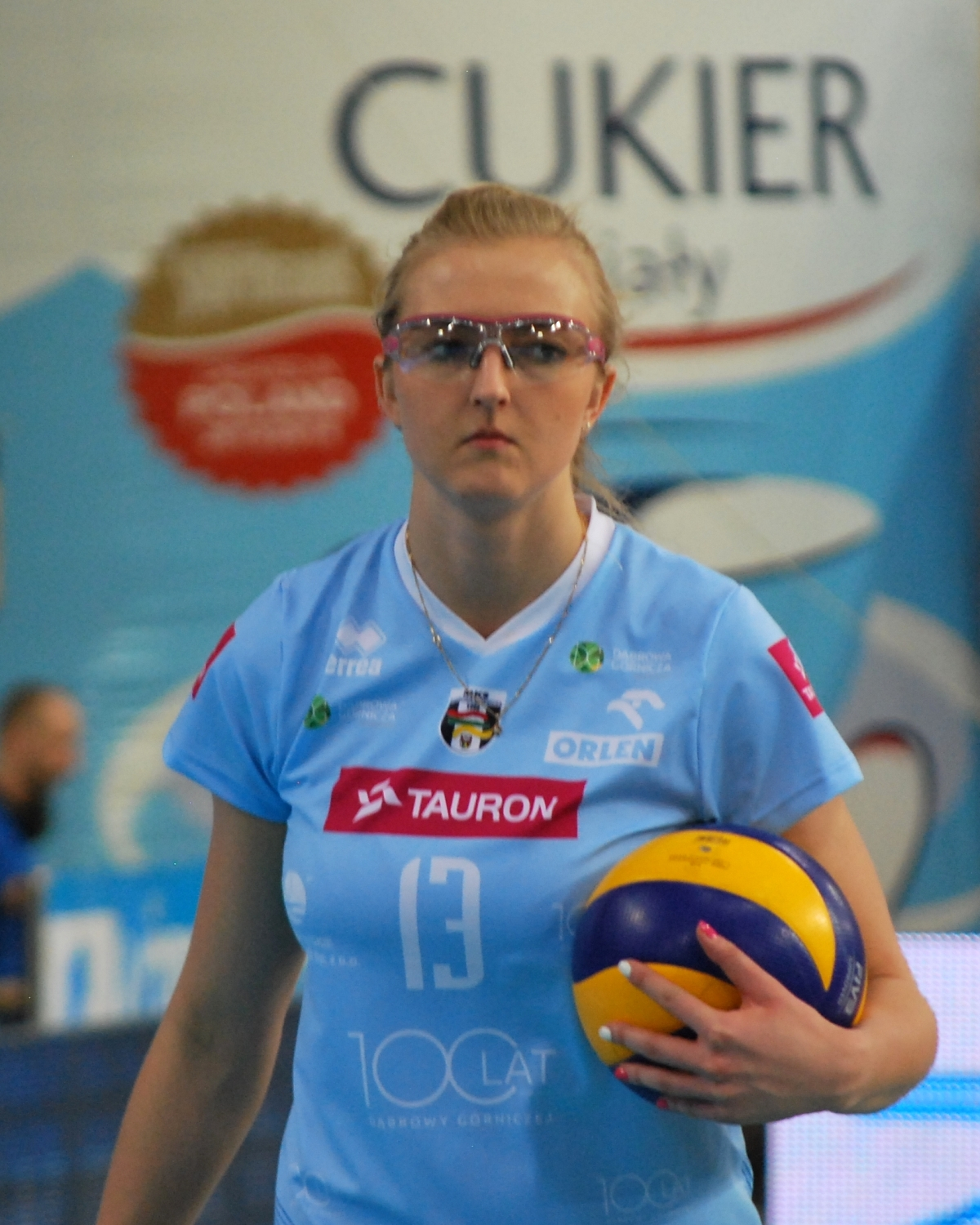

Personal information
- Nationality: Polish
- Born: 2 December 1991 (age 34)
- Height: 191 cm (75 in)
- Weight: 77 kg (170 lb)
- Spike: 315 cm (124 in)
- Block: 305 cm (120 in)

Volleyball information
- Number: 18 (national team)

Career
Teams
	KSZO Ostrowiec Św

National team
Poland

Kamila Ganszczyk (born 2 December 1991) is a Polish volleyball player, playing as a middle-blocker.

She is part of the Poland women's national volleyball team. She competed at the 2015 Women's European Volleyball Championship, and the 2016 FIVB Volleyball World Grand Prix. On club level she plays for KSZO Ostrowiec Św. In 2025 she was suspended for eight months for anti-doping rule violation.
