= Florina Chirilov =

Romanian volleyball player (born 1988)

Personal information
- Nationality: Romanian
- Born: 28 March 1988 (age 38)

Volleyball information
- Number: 8 (national team)

Career
Years	Teams
2015	SCM CSU Craiova

National team
2015	Romania

Florina Chirilov (born 28 March 1988) is a Romanian female volleyball player. She is part of the Romania women's national volleyball team.

She competed at the 2015 Women's European Volleyball Championship. On club level she plays for SCMU Craiova.
