= Yuri Marichev =

Russian volleyball player and coach

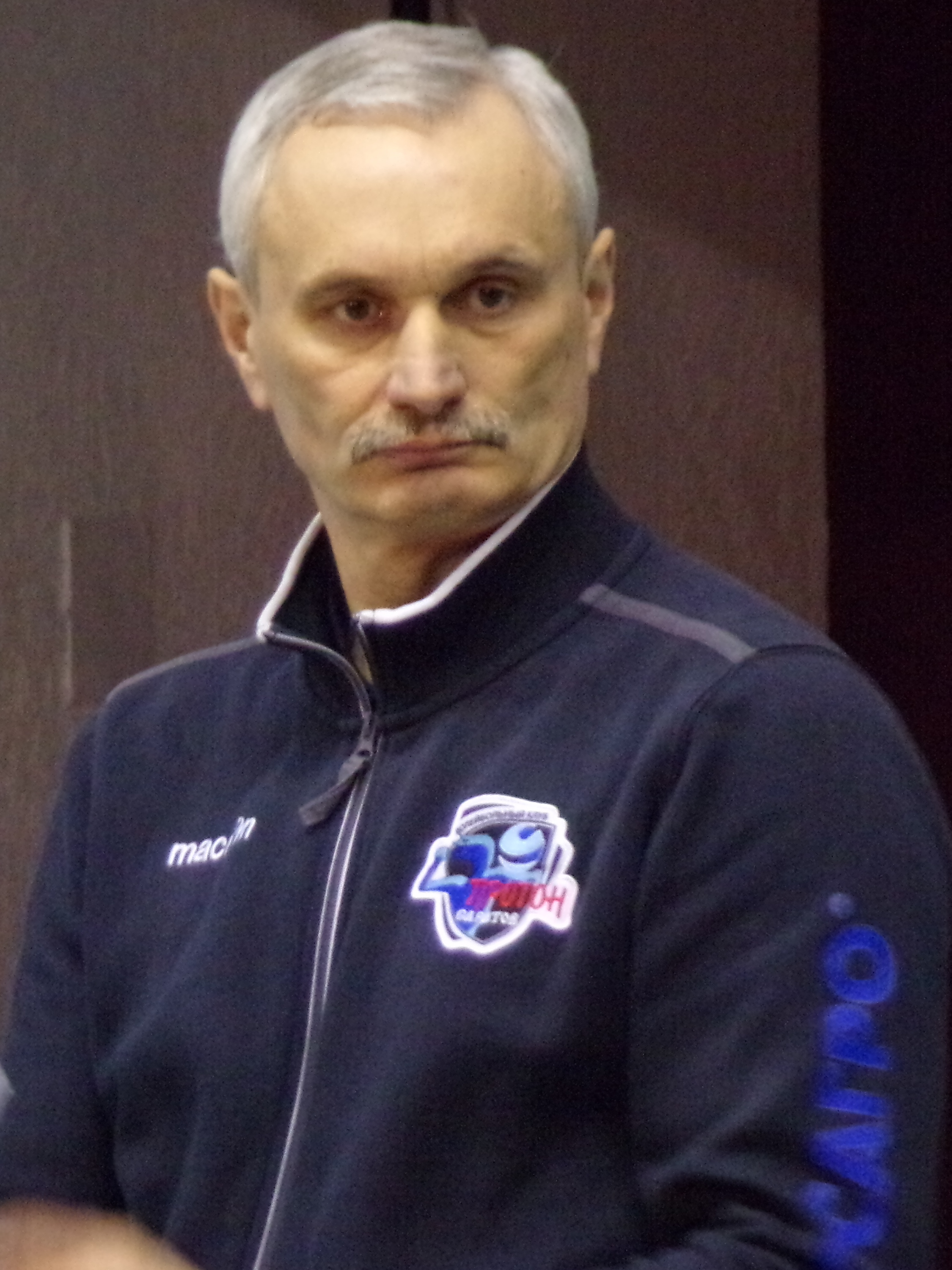

Personal information
- Nationality: Russian
- Born: 17 November 1960 (age 65) Tula, RSFSR, Soviet Union (now Russia)

Volleyball information
- Position: Head coach
Honours
Coach for Women's volleyball
Representing Russia
European Championship
Gold medal – first place	2013 Germany / Switzerland
Gold medal – first place	2015 Belgium / Netherlands

Yuri Nikolaevich Marichev (Russian: Юрий Николаевич Маричев; born 17 November 1960) is a former volleyball player and the coach of the Russian women's national volleyball team 2013—2016.

== Playing career ==
In 1991, Marichev won the gold medal in the Soviet Volleyball League. Also in 1991, he won the Turkish League, the European Cup and the European Super Cup, all with the Turkish team.

== Coaching ==
Marichev became a coach of the national women's volleyball team in January 2013 after the death of Coach Sergei Ovchinnikov. In 2005, he won the gold medal at FIVB Men's World Junior Championship with the Russian men's team. In 2013, he won the gold medal at the CEV European Championship in Germany and Switzerland. In 2014, he won the bronze medal at the World Grand Prix and took 5th place at the FIVB Volleyball Women's World Championship in Italy. In 2015, he won the bronze medal at the World Grand Prix and won the gold medal at the CEV European Championship in the Netherlands and Belgium.
