= Ksenia Parubets =

Russian volleyball player (born 1994)

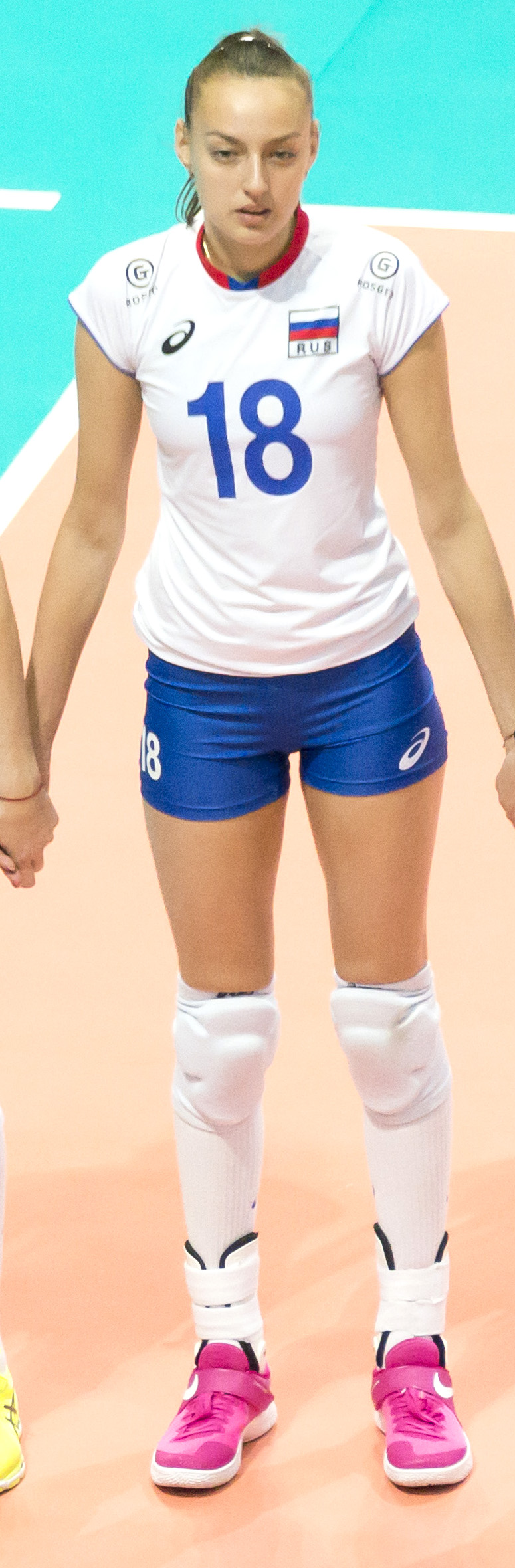

Personal information
- Nationality: Russian
- Born: October 31, 1994 (age 31); Yekaterinburg, Russia
- Height: 183 cm (6 ft 0 in)
- Weight: 64 kg (141 lb)
- Spike: 300 cm (118 in)
- Block: 286 cm (113 in)

Volleyball information
- Position: Outside-spiker
- Current club: VC Uralochka-NTMK
- Number: 13

Career
Years	Teams
2015 -	VC Uralochka-NTMK

National team
2015 -	Russia
Honours
Women's volleyball
Representing Russia
World Cup
Bronze medal – third place	2019 Japan
World Grand Prix
Silver medal – second place	2015 USA
European Championship
Gold medal – first place	2015 Netherlands/Belgium

Ksenia Alexandrovna Parubets (Russian: Ксения Александровна Парубец, née Ilchenko; born 31 October 1994) is a Russian volleyball player, playing as an outside-spiker. She is part of the Russia women's national volleyball team.

She participated in the 2015 FIVB Volleyball World Grand Prix. She won the gold medal at the 2015 Women's European Volleyball Championship. On club level she plays for VC Uralochka-NTMK.

On 7 May 2016, then-Ilchenko married Ruslan Parubets.

== National team ==
- 2015 FIVB World Grand Prix - Silver (with Russia)
- 2015 Women's European Volleyball Championship - Gold (with Russia)
- 2019 FIVB Volleyball Women's World Cup - Bronze (with Russia)
