= Nikolina Božičević =

Croatian volleyball player (born 1995)

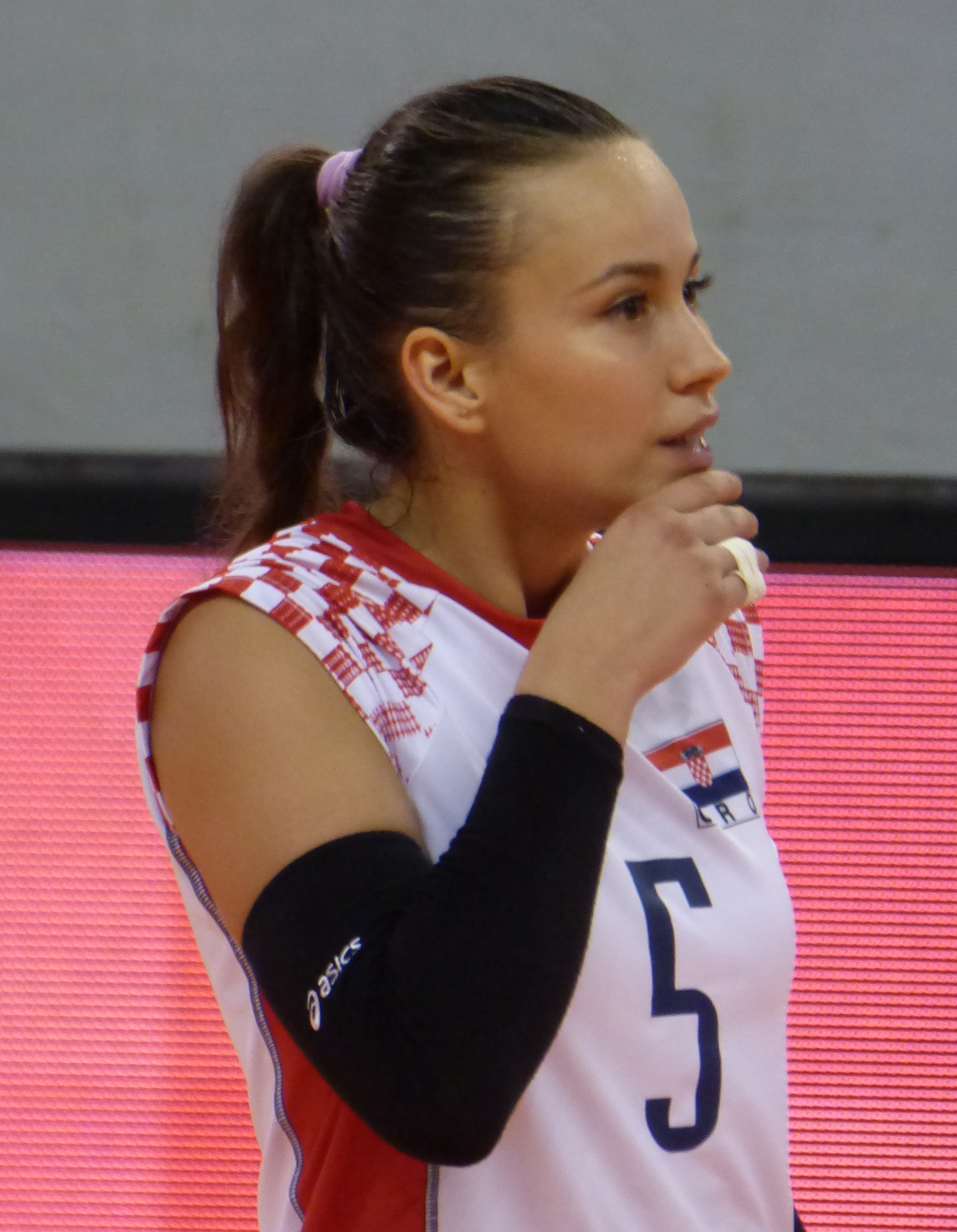

Personal information
- Born: 14 January 1995 (age 31); Zagreb, Croatia
- Height: 1.65 m (5 ft 5 in)
- Weight: 54 kg (119 lb)
- Spike: 215 cm (85 in)
- Block: 210 cm (83 in)

Volleyball information
- Position: Libero

Career
Years	Teams
2008–2016; 2016–2018; 2018–2019; 2019–2020; 2020–2021; 2021–2023	HAOK Mladost; OK Kaštela; Vasas SC; Pölkky Kuusamo; CSU Galați; CSM Târgoviște

National team
Croatia
Honours
Women's volleyball
Representing Croatia
Mediterranean Games
Gold medal – first place	2018 Tarragona
European League
Silver medal – second place	2021 Ruse
Silver medal – second place	2019 Varaždin

Nikolina Božičević (born 14 January 1995) is a Croatian volleyball player. She last played as libero for Romanian club CSM Târgoviște.

== International career ==
She is a member of the Croatia women's national volleyball team. She competed at the 2017 FIVB Volleyball World Grand Prix, and 2021 Women's European Volleyball League, winning a silver medal.
