= Renáta Sándor =

Hungarian volleyball player (born 1990)

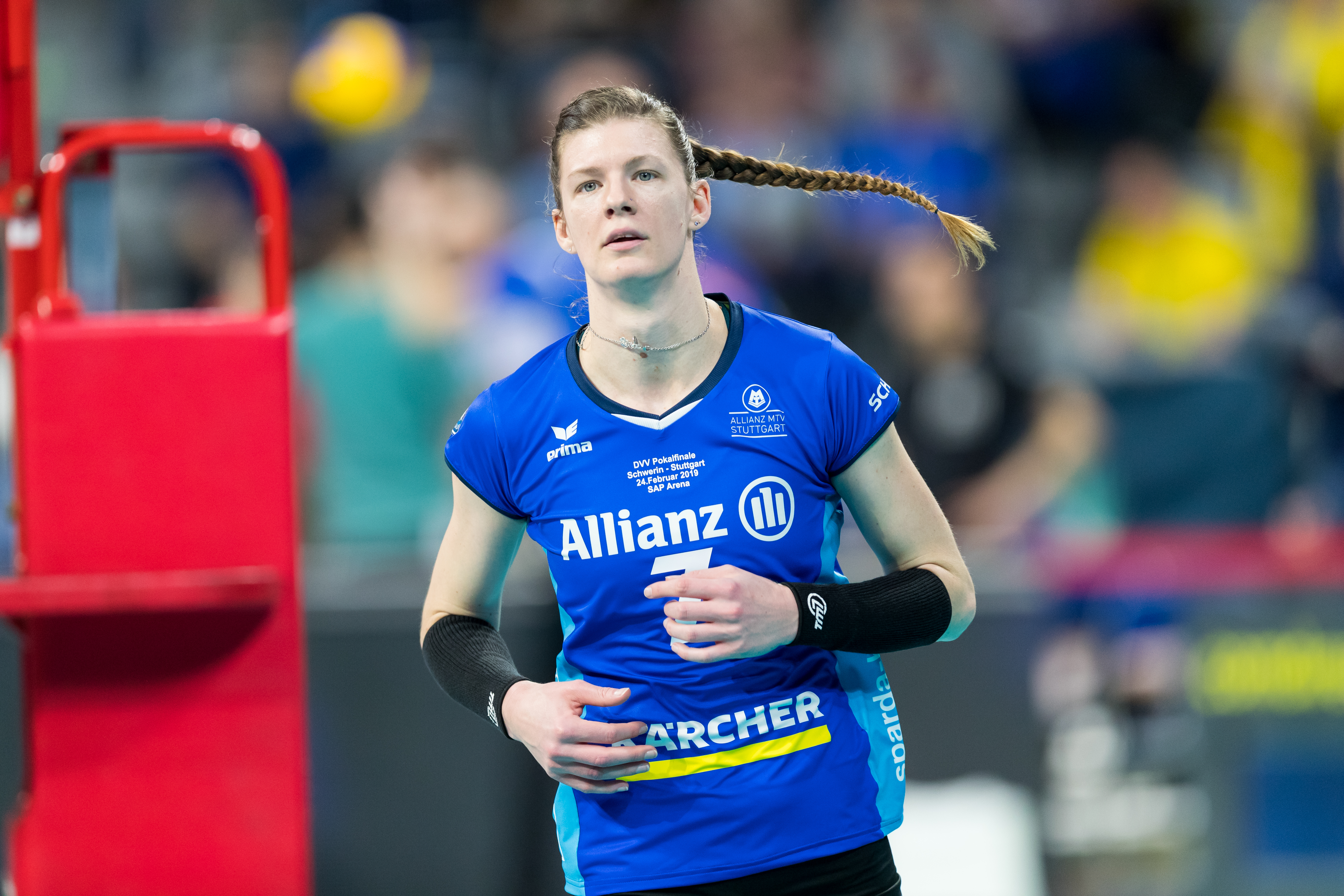
- Sándor in 2019

Personal information
- Nationality: Hungarian
- Born: 15 December 1990 (age 35); Jászberény, Hungary
- Height: 182 cm (72 in)
- Weight: 72 kg (159 lb)
- Spike: 302 cm (119 in)
- Block: 290 cm (114 in)

Volleyball information
- Position: Outside-spiker

Career
Years	Teams
2015–2019	Allianz MTV Stuttgart

National team
2015	Hungary

Renáta Sándor (born 15 December 1990) is a Hungarian volleyball player, playing as an outside-spiker. She is part of the Hungary women's national volleyball team.

She competed at the 2015 Women's European Volleyball Championship. On club level she plays for MTV Stoccarda.
