= Rita Liliom =

Hungarian volleyball player (born 1986)

Rita Bokorné Liliom
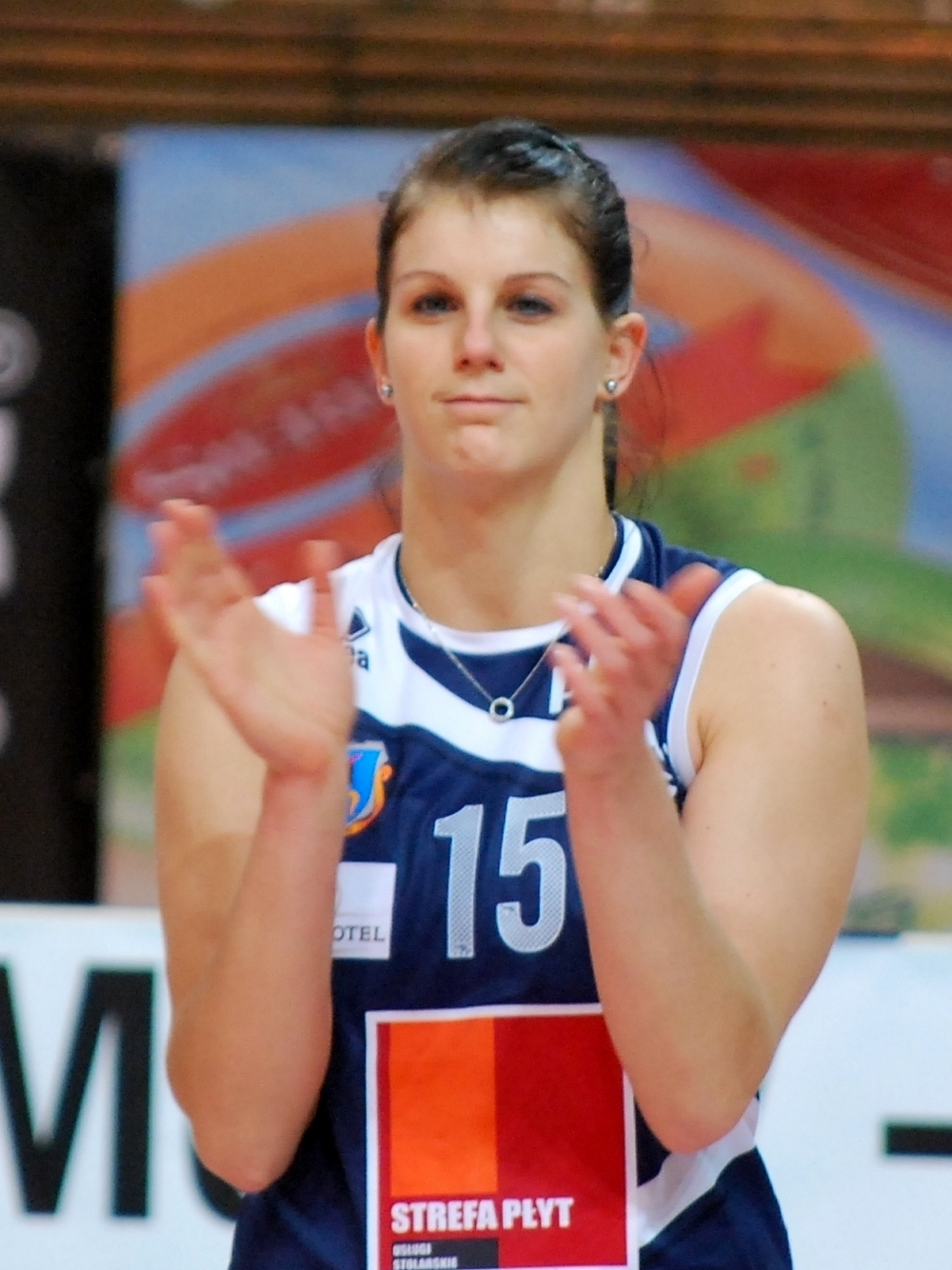
- Liliom in 2011

Personal information
- Nationality: Hungarian
- Born: 23 May 1986 (age 40)
- Height: 184 cm (72 in)
- Weight: 73 kg (161 lb)
- Spike: 305 cm (120 in)
- Block: 290 cm (114 in)

Volleyball information
- Position: Outside-spiker
- Number: 15 (national team)

Career
| Years | Teams |
|---|---|
| 2015 | Azzurra S. Casciano |

National team
| 2015 | Hungary |

Rita Bokorné Liliom (born 23 May 1986) is a Hungarian female volleyball player, playing as an outside-spiker. She is part of the Hungary women's national volleyball team.

She competed at the 2015 Women's European Volleyball Championship. On club level she plays for Azzurra S. Casciano.
