= Hungary women's national volleyball team =

Women's national volleyball team representing Hungary

Hungary
- Association: Magyar Röplabda Szövetség
- Confederation: CEV
- Head coach: Jan De Brandt
- FIVB ranking: 34 ▼5 (2 October 2026)

Uniforms
Home	Away

Summer Olympics
- Appearances: 3 (First in 1972)
- Best result: 4th (1976, 1980)

World Championship
- Appearances: 6 (First in 1952)
- Best result: 4th (1970)

World Cup
- Appearances: 1 (First in 1977)
- Best result: 6th (1977)

European Championship
- Appearances: 18 (First in 1949)
- Best result: 2nd (1975)
- www.hunvolley.hu

Hungary women's national volleyball team
Medal record

European Championship
Silver medal – second place	1975 Belgrade	
Bronze medal – third place	1977 Helsinki	
Bronze medal – third place	1981 Varna	
Bronze medal – third place	1983 East Berlin	

European League
Gold medal – first place	2015 Hungary/Turkey	
Silver medal – second place	2018 Hungary	
Silver medal – second place	2025 Sweden	
Bronze medal – third place	2026 Slovenia/Sweden	

The Hungary women's national volleyball team is the national volleyball team of Hungary. It is governed by the Magyar Röplabda Szövetség and takes part in international volleyball competitions.

== Results ==
=== Olympic Games ===
- 1972 — 5th place
- 1976 — 4th place
- 1980 — 4th place

=== World Championship ===
- 1952 — 6th place
- 1962 — 11th place
- 1970 — 4th place
- 1974 — 6th place
- 1978 — 13th place
- 1982 — 10th place

=== World Grand Prix ===
- 2017 — 25th place

=== Challenger Cup ===
- 2018 — 5th place

=== European Championship ===
- 1949 — 6th place
- 1950 — 6th place
- 1955 — 6th place
- 1958 — 6th place
- 1963 — 7th place
- 1967 — 5th place
- 1971 — 5th place
- 1975 — (silver)
- 1977 — (bronze)
- 1979 — 4th place
- 1981 — (bronze)
- 1983 — (bronze)
- 1985 — 9th place
- 1987 — 10th place
- 2015 — 12th place
- 2017 — 15th place
- 2019 — 20th place
- 2021 — 16th place
- 2023 — 24th place
- 2026 — 23rd place
- 2028 — Qualified

=== European Volleyball League ===
- 2011 — 9th place
- 2012 — 12th place
- 2013 — 7th place
- 2015 — Gold Medal
- 2016 — 10th place
- 2018 — Silver Medal
- 2019 — 5th place
- 2021 — 9th place
- 2022 — 7th place
- 2023 — 8th place
- 2024 — 15th place
- 2025 — Silver Medal
- 2026 — Bronze Medal

== Current squad ==
Head coach: Jan de Brandt (2014–2015)

No.	Name	Date of birth	Height	Weight	Spike	Block
1	Gréta Szakmáry	31 December 1991	1.85 m (6 ft 1 in)	77 kg (170 lb)	292 cm (115 in)	276 cm (109 in)
2	Zsanett Kötél	15 July 1986	1.74 m (5 ft 9 in)	70 kg (150 lb)	274 cm (108 in)	264 cm (104 in)
4	Bernadett Dékány	30 June 1992	1.87 m (6 ft 2 in)	76 kg (168 lb)	301 cm (119 in)	290 cm (110 in)
5	Adrienn Szabó	25 October 1995	1.77 m (5 ft 10 in)	61 kg (134 lb)	297 cm (117 in)	280 cm (110 in)
6	Evelin Vacsi	28 October 1993	1.77 m (5 ft 10 in)	68 kg (150 lb)	290 cm (110 in)	275 cm (108 in)
7	Renáta Sándor	15 December 1990	1.82 m (6 ft 0 in)	68 kg (150 lb)	310 cm (120 in)	290 cm (110 in)
8	Zsuzsanna Tálas	9 July 1993	1.74 m (5 ft 9 in)	66 kg (146 lb)	285 cm (112 in)	270 cm (110 in)
9	Vivien Lévai	12 May 1992	1.64 m (5 ft 5 in)	57 kg (126 lb)	264 cm (104 in)	250 cm (98 in)
10	Zsanett Miklai	16 February 1992	1.88 m (6 ft 2 in)	81 kg (179 lb)	298 cm (117 in)	288 cm (113 in)
11	Dóra Kötél	16 June 1988	1.75 m (5 ft 9 in)	61 kg (134 lb)	273 cm (107 in)	263 cm (104 in)
12	Dorottya Bodnár	31 August 1995	1.83 m (6 ft 0 in)	65 kg (143 lb)	298 cm (117 in)	280 cm (110 in)
13	Petra Széles	27 January 1988	1.76 m (5 ft 9 in)	67 kg (148 lb)	299 cm (118 in)	279 cm (110 in)
14	Edina Dobi	22 October 1987	1.90 m (6 ft 3 in)	70 kg (150 lb)	308 cm (121 in)	299 cm (118 in)
15	Rita Liliom	23 May 1986	1.84 m (6 ft 0 in)	73 kg (161 lb)	305 cm (120 in)	295 cm (116 in)
17	Ágnes Pallag	2 September 1993	1.78 m (5 ft 10 in)	69 kg (152 lb)	290 cm (110 in)	287 cm (113 in)
18	Dóra Horváth	4 March 1988	1.87 m (6 ft 2 in)	78 kg (172 lb)	305 cm (120 in)	295 cm (116 in)
19	Szandra Szombathelyi	2 August 1989	1.79 m (5 ft 10 in)	69 kg (152 lb)	288 cm (113 in)	278 cm (109 in)
20	Petra Csengeri	1 January 1990	1.87 m (6 ft 2 in)	68 kg (150 lb)	300 cm (120 in)	280 cm (110 in)
