= 2015 Women's European Volleyball Championship =

Tournament details
- Host countries: Netherlands; Belgium
- Dates: 26 September – 4 October
- Teams: 16
- Venue: 5 (in 4 host cities)

Final positions
- Champions: Russia (19th title)

Tournament awards
- MVP: (Russia) Tatiana Kosheleva

Tournament statistics
- Matches played: 36

The 2015 Women's European Volleyball Championship was the 29th edition of the European Volleyball Championship, organised by Europe's governing volleyball body, the Confédération Européenne de Volleyball. It was hosted by Netherlands and Belgium from 26 September to 4 October 2015. The championship managers were the Dutch Olympic gold volleyball medalist Peter Blange and the former Belgian volleyball player Virginie De Carne. Russia defeated Netherlands 3–0 in the final to capture their 19th title, while Tatiana Kosheleva was elected most valuable player back to back.

== Qualification ==
Team	Method of qualification
Azerbaijan	Qualification Third round play-off winners
Belarus	Qualification Third round play-off winners
Belgium	Hosts
Bulgaria	Qualification Second round group D winners
Croatia	2013 edition fifth place
Czech Republic	Qualification Second round group C winners
Germany	2013 edition second place
Hungary	Qualification Second round group E winners
Italy	2013 edition sixth place
Netherlands	Hosts
Poland	Qualification Second round group B winners
Romania	Qualification Second round group F winners
Russia	2013 edition first place
Serbia	2013 edition fourth place
Slovenia	Qualification Third round play-off winners
Turkey	Qualification Second round group A winners

== Format ==
The tournament was played in two different stages. In the first stage, the sixteen participants were divided in four groups of four teams each. A single round-robin format was played within each group to determine the teams group position (as per criteria below). The three best teams of each group (total of 12 teams) progressed to the second stage, with group winners advancing to the quarterfinals while second and third placed advanced to the playoffs.

=== Pool standing criteria ===
1. Number of matches won
2. Result points (3 points for 3–0 or 3–1 win; 2 points for 3–2 win; 1 point for 2–3 loss)
3. Sets ratio
4. Points ratio
5. Result of the last match between the tied teams

The second stage of the tournament consisted of a single-elimination, with winners advancing to the next round. A playoff was played (involving group second and third places) to determine which teams joined the group winners in the quarterfinals, followed by semifinals, 3rd place match and final.

== Pools composition ==
The drawing of lots was held in Antwerp, Belgium on 12 November 2014. First, the hosts and the team which was chosen by the hosts were seeded at the top of each pool. Then the next 4 teams which ranked highest in the previous edition were drawn. Finally, the other teams were drawn. Numbers in brackets denote the European ranking as of 25 September 2015.

Pool A	Pool B	Pool C	Pool D
Netherlands (7)	Belgium (8)	Russia (2)	Serbia (3)
Italy (1)	Turkey (4)	Croatia (9)	Germany (5)
Poland (6)	Hungary (18)	Bulgaria (10)	Romania (13)
Slovenia (25)	Azerbaijan (10)	Belarus (19)	Czech Republic (12)

== Venues ==
Pool A	Pool C	Championship round
Apeldoorn, Netherlands	Rotterdam, Netherlands	
Omnisport Apeldoorn	Topsportcentrum Rotterdam	Rotterdam Ahoy
Capacity: 6,000	Capacity: 2,500	Capacity: 14,000
Pool B and Championship round	Tournament host cities	Pool D
Antwerp, Belgium	Tournament host cities	Eindhoven, Netherlands
Lotto Arena	Tournament host cities	Indoor-Sportcentrum Eindhoven
Capacity: 5,200	Tournament host cities	Capacity: 4,000

== Preliminary round ==
All times are Central European Summer Time (UTC+02:00).

=== Pool A ===
- venue: Omnisport, Apeldoorn, Netherlands

Pos	Team	Pld	W	L	Pts	SW	SL	SR	SPW	SPL	SPR	Qualification
1	Netherlands (H)	3	3	0	9	9	1	9.000	244	172	1.419	Quarterfinals
2	Italy	3	2	1	6	6	5	1.200	250	211	1.185	Playoffs
3	Poland	3	1	2	3	5	6	0.833	222	248	0.895	Playoffs
4	Slovenia	3	0	3	0	1	9	0.111	164	249	0.659	

Source: CEV
(H) Host

Date	Time		Score		Set 1	Set 2	Set 3	Set 4	Set 5	Total	Report
26 Sep	15:30	Slovenia	0–3	Netherlands	12–25	14–25	22–25			48–75	Report
26 Sep	18:30	Italy	3–1	Poland	25–20	21–25	25–17	25–16		96–78	Report
27 Sep	15:30	Netherlands	3–1	Poland	25–15	25–11	19–25	25–18		94–69	Report
27 Sep	18:30	Slovenia	1–3	Italy	9–25	12–25	26–24	11–25		58–99	Report
28 Sep	17:00	Poland	3–0	Slovenia	25–18	25–19	25–21			75–58	Report
28 Sep	20:00	Netherlands	3–0	Italy	25–15	25–18	25–22			75–55	Report

=== Pool B ===
- venue: Lotto Arena, Antwerp, Belgium

Pos	Team	Pld	W	L	Pts	SW	SL	SR	SPW	SPL	SPR	Qualification
1	Turkey	3	3	0	9	9	0	MAX	228	165	1.382	Quarterfinals
2	Belgium (H)	3	2	1	6	6	3	2.000	203	178	1.140	Playoffs
3	Hungary	3	1	2	3	3	7	0.429	196	232	0.845	Playoffs
4	Azerbaijan	3	0	3	0	1	9	0.111	204	256	0.797	

Source: CEV
(H) Host

Date	Time		Score		Set 1	Set 2	Set 3	Set 4	Set 5	Total	Report
26 Sep	17:30	Hungary	0–3	Belgium	15–25	8–25	18–25			41–75	Report
26 Sep	20:30	Turkey	3–0	Azerbaijan	25–21	28–26	25–13			78–60	Report
27 Sep	16:00	Belgium	3–0	Azerbaijan	25–17	25–20	27–25			77–62	Report
27 Sep	19:00	Hungary	0–3	Turkey	20–25	20–25	14–25			54–75	Report
28 Sep	17:00	Azerbaijan	1–3	Hungary	16–25	28–26	22–25	16–25		82–101	Report
28 Sep	20:00	Belgium	0–3	Turkey	18–25	17–25	16–25			51–75	Report

=== Pool C ===
- venue: Topsportcentrum, Rotterdam, Netherlands

Pos	Team	Pld	W	L	Pts	SW	SL	SR	SPW	SPL	SPR	Qualification
1	Russia	3	2	1	6	6	3	2.000	221	177	1.249	Quarterfinals
2	Belarus	3	2	1	5	6	5	1.200	230	241	0.954	Playoffs
3	Croatia	3	2	1	5	6	5	1.200	239	253	0.945	Playoffs
4	Bulgaria	3	0	3	2	4	9	0.444	258	277	0.931	

Source: CEV

Date	Time		Score		Set 1	Set 2	Set 3	Set 4	Set 5	Total	Report
26 Sep	15:00	Bulgaria	0–3	Russia	6–25	14–25	25–27			45–77	Report
26 Sep	18:00	Croatia	0–3	Belarus	19–25	18–25	24–26			61–76	Report
27 Sep	15:00	Russia	3–0	Belarus	25–18	25–16	25–21			75–55	Report
27 Sep	18:00	Bulgaria	2–3	Croatia	23–25	25–22	25–14	22–25	13–15	108–101	Report
28 Sep	17:00	Belarus	3–2	Bulgaria	25–21	25–23	14–25	20–25	15–11	99–105	Report
28 Sep	20:00	Russia	0–3	Croatia	21–25	24–26	24–26			69–77	Report

=== Pool D ===
- venue: Indoor-Sportcentrum, Eindhoven, Netherlands

Pos	Team	Pld	W	L	Pts	SW	SL	SR	SPW	SPL	SPR	Qualification
1	Serbia	3	3	0	9	9	0	MAX	225	169	1.331	Quarterfinals
2	Germany	3	2	1	6	6	4	1.500	233	206	1.131	Playoffs
3	Czech Republic	3	1	2	3	3	6	0.500	193	196	0.985	Playoffs
4	Romania	3	0	3	0	1	9	0.111	169	249	0.679	

Source: CEV

Date	Time		Score		Set 1	Set 2	Set 3	Set 4	Set 5	Total	Report
26 Sep	15:00	Czech Republic	3–0	Romania	25–13	25–18	25–15			75–46	Report
26 Sep	18:00	Serbia	3–0	Germany	25–18	25–22	25–19			75–59	Report
27 Sep	15:00	Romania	1–3	Germany	14–25	26–24	15–25	19–25		74–99	Report
27 Sep	18:00	Czech Republic	0–3	Serbia	20–25	23–25	18–25			61–75	Report
28 Sep	17:00	Germany	3–0	Czech Republic	25–17	25–23	25–17			75–57	Report
28 Sep	20:00	Romania	0–3	Serbia	20–25	14–25	15–25			49–75	Report

== Championship round ==
All times are Central European Summer Time (UTC+02:00).

- venues:

Lotto Arena, Antwerp, Belgium
Ahoy, Rotterdam, Netherlands

Playoffs; 30 September
Belarus	2
Poland	3
Germany	3
Hungary	0
Italy	3
Croatia	0
Belgium	3
Czech Republic	1

Quarterfinals; 1 October
Netherlands	3
Poland	1
Turkey	3
Germany	2
Russia	3
Italy	1
Serbia	3
Belgium	1

Semifinals; 3 October
Netherlands	3
Turkey	0
Russia	3
Serbia	1

Final; 4 October
Netherlands	0
Russia	3
Third place
Turkey	0
Serbia	3

=== Playoffs ===
Date	Time		Score		Set 1	Set 2	Set 3	Set 4	Set 5	Total	Report
30 Sep	17:00	Italy	3–0	Croatia	25–22	25–21	25–20			75–63	Report
30 Sep	17:30	Germany	3–0	Hungary	25–18	25–17	25–14			75–49	Report
30 Sep	20:00	Belarus	2–3	Poland	17–25	13–25	25–22	25–20	12–15	92–107	Report
30 Sep	20:30	Belgium	3–1	Czech Republic	25–12	23–25	25–21	25–9		98–67	Report

=== Quarterfinals ===
Date	Time		Score		Set 1	Set 2	Set 3	Set 4	Set 5	Total	Report
1 Oct	17:00	Russia	3–1	Italy	30–28	20–25	25–23	25–20		100–96	Report
1 Oct	17:30	Turkey	3–2	Germany	25–20	21–25	20–25	25–23	15–12	106–105	Report
1 Oct	20:00	Netherlands	3–1	Poland	25–16	23–25	25–16	25–16		98–73	Report
1 Oct	20:30	Serbia	3–1	Belgium	19–25	29–27	25–11	25–18		98–81	Report

=== Semifinals ===
Date	Time		Score		Set 1	Set 2	Set 3	Set 4	Set 5	Total	Report
3 Oct	15:30	Netherlands	3–0	Turkey	25–22	25–18	28–26			78–66	Report
3 Oct	18:30	Russia	3–1	Serbia	25–23	25–23	21–25	25–22		96–93	Report

=== Bronze medal match ===
Date	Time		Score		Set 1	Set 2	Set 3	Set 4	Set 5	Total	Report
4 Oct	14:00	Turkey	0–3	Serbia	19–25	17–25	18–25			54–75	Report

=== Final ===
Date	Time		Score		Set 1	Set 2	Set 3	Set 4	Set 5	Total	Report
4 Oct	17:00	Netherlands	0–3	Russia	14–25	20–25	20–25			54–75	Report

== Final standing ==
Rank	Team
1st place, gold medalist(s)	Russia
2nd place, silver medalist(s)	Netherlands
3rd place, bronze medalist(s)	Serbia
4	Turkey
5	Germany
6	Belgium
7	Italy
8	Poland
9	Belarus
10	Croatia
11	Czech Republic
12	Hungary
13	Bulgaria
14	Azerbaijan
15	Romania
16	Slovenia

2015 Women's European Championship

Russia
19th title

14–woman roster
Nataliya Obmochaeva, Tatiana Kosheleva, Yana Shcherban, Aleksandra Pasynkova, Anna Malova, Victoria Kuzyakina, Evgeniya Startseva, Ekaterina Kosianenko, Ekaterina Lyubushkina, Ekaterina Orlova, Irina Fetisova, Irina Zaryazhko, Natalia Malykh, Kseniia Ilchenko
Head coach
Yuri Marichev

== Individual awards ==
- Most valuable player

Tatiana Kosheleva (RUS)

- Best setter

Maja Ognjenović (SRB)

- Best outside spikers

Tatiana Kosheleva (RUS)
Anne Buijs (NED)

- Best middle blockers

Irina Zaryazhko (RUS)
Eda Erdem Dündar (TUR)

- Best opposite spiker

Lonneke Slöetjes (NED)

- Best libero

Anna Malova (RUS)

- Fair play award

Hans Nieukerke (NED)
