= 2018 Montreux Volley Masters squads =

This article shows the rosters of all participating teams at the 2018 Montreux Volley Masters in Switzerland.

== Brazil ==
The Brazilian roster in the 2018 Montreux Volley Masters:

Head coach: José Roberto Lages Guimarães

No.	Name	Date of birth	Height	Weight	Spike	Block	2017 club
1	Gabriella Souza	14 December 1993	1.75 m (5 ft 9 in)	69 kg (152 lb)	296 cm (117 in)	273 cm (107 in)	(Brazil) Molico/Nestlé
3	Danielle Lins	5 January 1995	1.81 m (5 ft 11 in)	68 kg (150 lb)	290 cm (110 in)	276 cm (109 in)	(Brazil) Osasco Voleibol Clube
4	Ana Carolina Da Silva	1 April 1991	1.83 m (6 ft 0 in)	73 kg (161 lb)	290 cm (110 in)	290 cm (110 in)	(Brazil) Rexona-Sesc
5	Adenizia Da Silva	18 December 1986	1.85 m (6 ft 1 in)	63 kg (139 lb)	312 cm (123 in)	290 cm (110 in)	(Brazil) Molico/Nestlé
6	Thaisa Daher De Menezes	15 May 1987	1.96 m (6 ft 5 in)	79 kg (174 lb)	316 cm (124 in)	301 cm (119 in)	(Turkey) Eczacibasi VitrA Istanbul
7	Rosamaria Montibeller	9 April 1994	1.85 m (6 ft 1 in)	76 kg (168 lb)	291 cm (115 in)	285 cm (112 in)	(Brazil) AMIL
9	Roberta Silva Ratzke	8 October 1998	1.85 m (6 ft 1 in)	71 kg (157 lb)	287 cm (113 in)	278 cm (109 in)	(Brazil) Rexona-Sesc
10	Gabriela Braga Guimaraes	28 April 1990	1.8 m (5 ft 11 in)	65 kg (143 lb)	305 cm (120 in)	289 cm (114 in)	(Brazil) Minas Tenis Clube
12	Natalia Pereira (C)	4 April 1989	1.86 m (6 ft 1 in)	83 kg (183 lb)	311 cm (122 in)	295 cm (116 in)	(Brazil) Minas Tenis Clube
13	Amanda Francisco	16 August 1988	1.80 m (5 ft 11 in)	62 kg (137 lb)	304 cm (120 in)	286 cm (113 in)	(Brazil) Rexona-Ades
14	Drussyla Costa	1 July 1996	1.82 m (6 ft 0 in)	73 kg (161 lb)	304 cm (120 in)	286 cm (113 in)	(Brazil) Rexona-Ades
15	Monique Marinho Pavao	31 October 1986	1.78 m (5 ft 10 in)	67 kg (148 lb)	294 cm (116 in)	285 cm (112 in)	(Brazil) Rexona-Sesc
16	Fernanda Rodrigues	10 May 1986	1.79 m (5 ft 10 in)	74 kg (163 lb)	308 cm (121 in)	288 cm (113 in)	(Russia) Dinamo Krasnodar
17	Suelen Pinto	4 October 1987	1.66 m (5 ft 5 in)	81 kg (179 lb)	256 cm (101 in)	238 cm (94 in)	(Brazil) SESI - SP

== China ==
The Chinese roster in the 2018 Montreux Volley Masters:

Head coach: An Jiajie

No.	Name	Date of birth	Height	Weight	Spike	Block	2015 club
2	Han Wu	23 April 1998	1.83 m (6 ft 0 in)	64 kg (141 lb)	294 cm (116 in)	284 cm (112 in)	(China) Jiangsu
4	Hanyu Yang	12 October 1999	1.92 m (6 ft 4 in)	72 kg (159 lb)	317 cm (125 in)	311 cm (122 in)	Shandong
5	Yi Gao	22 July 1998	1.93 m (6 ft 4 in)	66 kg (146 lb)	304 cm (120 in)	298 cm (117 in)	Bayi
6	Xiangyu Gong	21 April 1997	1.86 m (6 ft 1 in)	72 kg (159 lb)	313 cm (123 in)	302 cm (119 in)	(China) Jiangsu
10	Xiaotong Liu (C)	16 February 1990	1.88 m (6 ft 2 in)	80 kg (180 lb)	312 cm (123 in)	300 cm (120 in)	Beijing
13	Linyu Diao	7 April 1994	1.82 m (6 ft 0 in)	69 kg (152 lb)	309 cm (122 in)	303 cm (119 in)	Jiangsu
15	Li Lin	5 July 1992	1.71 m (5 ft 7 in)	65 kg (143 lb)	294 cm (116 in)	294 cm (116 in)	Fujian
19	Yanhan Liu	19 January 1993	1.88 m (6 ft 2 in)	75 kg (165 lb)	315 cm (124 in)	305 cm (120 in)	Bayi
20	Fang Duan	26 December 1994	1.86 m (6 ft 1 in)	73 kg (161 lb)	301 cm (119 in)	296 cm (117 in)	Liaoning
24	Haiping Sun	23 May 1996	1.80 m (5 ft 11 in)	65 kg (143 lb)	300 cm (120 in)	292 cm (115 in)	Liaoning
25	Mingyuan Hu	17 May 1996	1.87 m (6 ft 2 in)	69 kg (152 lb)	305 cm (120 in)	297 cm (117 in)	Liaoning
26	Zixuan Meng	18 November 1996	1.80 m (5 ft 11 in)	62 kg (137 lb)	298 cm (117 in)	290 cm (110 in)	Tianjin

== Cameroon ==
The Cameroon roster in the 2018 Montreux Volley Masters:

Head coach: Akono Jean Rene Bekono

No.	Name	Date of birth	Height	Weight	Spike	Block	2015 club
1	Stephanie Fotso Mogoung	25 September 1987	1.87 m (6 ft 2 in)	78 kg (172 lb)	301 cm (119 in)	275 cm (108 in)	VOLLEYBALL CLUB HARNES
2	Christelle Tchoudjang Nana (C)	7 July 1989	1.84 m (6 ft 0 in)	80 kg (180 lb)	308 cm (121 in)	285 cm (112 in)	VBC CHAMALIERES
3	Théorine Christelle Aboa Mbeza	25 August 1992	1.82 m (6 ft 0 in)	78 kg (172 lb)	294 cm (116 in)	275 cm (108 in)	FAP VB
6	Laetitia Crescence Moma Bassoko	9 October 1993	1.84 m (6 ft 0 in)	81 kg (179 lb)	301 cm (119 in)	281 cm (111 in)	MARCQ EN BAROEUIL VB
7	Henriette Nadege Koulla	14 September 1992	1.71 m (5 ft 7 in)	67 kg (148 lb)	280 cm (110 in)	264 cm (104 in)	TREMBLAY
9	Honorine Djakao Gamkoua	27 February 1992	1.72 m (5 ft 8 in)	65 kg (143 lb)	280 cm (110 in)	270 cm (110 in)	FAP
10	Berthrade Simone Flore Bikatal	23 July 1992	1.83 m (6 ft 0 in)	76 kg (168 lb)	297 cm (117 in)	253 cm (100 in)	POITIER SAINT BENOIT
11	Victoire Pauline L'or Ngon Ntame	31 December 1985	1.77 m (5 ft 10 in)	79 kg (174 lb)	288 cm (113 in)	253 cm (100 in)	INJS VB
12	Abdoulkarim Fawziya	1 March 1989	1.80 m (5 ft 11 in)	67 kg (148 lb)	292 cm (115 in)	275 cm (108 in)	SENS OLYMPIQUE CLUB VOLLEYBALL
14	Yolande Juliana Amana Guigolo	15 September 1997	1.84 m (6 ft 0 in)	78 kg (172 lb)	292 cm (115 in)	275 cm (108 in)	BAFIA VOLLEYBALL EVOLUTION
15	Emelda Piata Zessi	8 April 1997	1.90 m (6 ft 3 in)	65 kg (143 lb)	295 cm (116 in)	281 cm (111 in)	BAFIA VOLLEY EVOLUTION
16	Estelle Adiana	14 May 1997	1.82 m (6 ft 0 in)	85 kg (187 lb)	285 cm (112 in)	256 cm (101 in)	NYONG EKELLE
19	Reine Ngameni Mbopda Davina	14 November 2002	1.68 m (5 ft 6 in)	65 kg (143 lb)	250 cm (98 in)	240 cm (94 in)	BAFIA VOLLEYBALL EVOLUTION
20	Ruth Manuela Marie Bibinbe	23 April 2002	1.88 m (6 ft 2 in)	81 kg (179 lb)	296 cm (117 in)	278 cm (109 in)	BAFIA VOLLEYBALL EVOLUTION

== Italy ==
The Italian roster in the 2018 Montreux Volley Masters:

Head coach: Mazzanti Davide

No.	Name	Date of birth	Height	Weight	Spike	Block	2015 club
1	Serena Ortolani	7 January 1987	1.87 m (6 ft 2 in)	63 kg (139 lb)	320 cm (130 in)	240 cm (94 in)	Pro Victoria Pallavolo SRL
3	Carlotta Cambi	28 May 1996	1.77 m (5 ft 10 in)	66 kg (146 lb)	302 cm (119 in)	292 cm (115 in)	Robursport SRL
5	Ofelia Malinov	29 February 1996	1.85 m (6 ft 1 in)	70 kg (150 lb)	304 cm (120 in)	285 cm (112 in)	Volley Bergamo SRL
6	Monica De Gennaro	8 January 1987	1.74 m (5 ft 9 in)	67 kg (148 lb)	292 cm (115 in)	217 cm (85 in)	Imoco Volley SRL SSD
7	Sylvia Chinelo Nwakalor	12 August 1999	1.80 m (5 ft 11 in)	70 kg (150 lb)	330 cm (130 in)	312 cm (123 in)	Cub Italia
9	Laura Melandri	31 January 1995	1.84 m (6 ft 0 in)	60 kg (130 lb)	305 cm (120 in)	236 cm (93 in)	Imoco Volley SRL SSD
10	Cristina Chirichella (C)	10 February 1994	1.94 m (6 ft 4 in)	79 kg (174 lb)	322 cm (127 in)	306 cm (120 in)	Agil Volley SSDARL
11	Anna Danesi	20 April 1996	1.98 m (6 ft 6 in)	78 kg (172 lb)	312 cm (123 in)	294 cm (116 in)	Imoco Volley SRL SSD
12	Anastasia Guerra	15 October 1996	1.87 m (6 ft 2 in)	69 kg (152 lb)	312 cm (123 in)	294 cm (116 in)	VBC Pallavolo Rosa SSDRL
15	Marina Lubian	11 April 2000	1.95 m (6 ft 5 in)	73 kg (161 lb)	318 cm (125 in)	300 cm (120 in)	Club Italia
16	Lucia Bosetti	9 July 1989	1.78 m (5 ft 10 in)	63 kg (139 lb)	310 cm (120 in)	292 cm (115 in)	Pallavolo Scandicci SDB SSDRL
17	Miryam Fatime Sylla	8 January 1995	1.84 m (6 ft 0 in)	80 kg (180 lb)	320 cm (130 in)	240 cm (94 in)	Volley Bergamo SRL
18	Paola Ogechi Egonu	18 December 1998	1.93 m (6 ft 4 in)	80 kg (180 lb)	344 cm (135 in)	321 cm (126 in)	Agil Volley SSDARL
20	Beatrice Parrocchiale	26 December 1995	1.68 m (5 ft 6 in)	59 kg (130 lb)	286 cm (113 in)	258 cm (102 in)	Azzurra Volley San Casciano SSD

== Poland ==
The Polish roster in the 2018 Montreux Volley Masters:

No.	Name	Date of birth	Height	Weight	Spike	Block	2015 club
1	Julia Nowicka	21 October 1998	1.74 m (5 ft 9 in)	58 kg (128 lb)	295 cm (116 in)	278 cm (109 in)	BKS Profi Credit Bielsko Biala
3	Klaudia Alagierska	2 January 1996	1.90 m (6 ft 3 in)	76 kg (168 lb)	297 cm (117 in)	290 cm (110 in)	LKS Commercecon Lódz
4	Marlena Plesnierowicz	9 January 1992	1.76 m (5 ft 9 in)	61 kg (134 lb)	295 cm (116 in)	281 cm (111 in)	Chemik Police
5	Agnieszka Kakolewska C	17 October 1994	1.97 m (6 ft 6 in)	75 kg (165 lb)	309 cm (122 in)	295 cm (116 in)	Pomi Volleyball Casalmaggiore
6	Justyna Lukasik	27 January 1993	1.87 m (6 ft 2 in)	77 kg (170 lb)	301 cm (119 in)	285 cm (112 in)	Trefl Proxima Krakow
8	Maria Stenzel	25 November 1998	1.68 m (5 ft 6 in)	53 kg (117 lb)	278 cm (109 in)	262 cm (103 in)	Grot Budowlani Lódz
10	Zuzanna Efimienko-Mlotkowska	8 August 1989	1.97 m (6 ft 6 in)	72 kg (159 lb)	318 cm (125 in)	303 cm (119 in)	LKS Commercecon Lódz
14	Martyna Lukasik	26 November 1999	1.89 m (6 ft 2 in)	75 kg (165 lb)	315 cm (124 in)	288 cm (113 in)	Chemik Police
15	Martyna Grajber	28 March 1995	1.80 m (5 ft 11 in)	67 kg (148 lb)	293 cm (115 in)	276 cm (109 in)	Chemik Police
17	Malwina Smarzek	3 June 1996	1.91 m (6 ft 3 in)	80 kg (180 lb)	318 cm (125 in)	292 cm (115 in)	Zanetti Volley Bergamo
19	Magdalena Damaske	19 February 1996	1.85 m (6 ft 1 in)	65 kg (143 lb)	312 cm (123 in)	281 cm (111 in)	Legionovia Legionowo
22	Natalia Murek	8 September 1999	1.80 m (5 ft 11 in)	70 kg (150 lb)	302 cm (119 in)	283 cm (111 in)	Impel Wroclaw
23	Julia Twardowska	4 May 1995	1.85 m (6 ft 1 in)	66 kg (146 lb)	297 cm (117 in)	283 cm (111 in)	Grot Budowlani Lodz
24	Justyna Lysiak	20 January 1999	1.73 m (5 ft 8 in)	58 kg (128 lb)	275 cm (108 in)	264 cm (104 in)	Chemik Police

== Russia ==
The Russian roster in the 2018 Montreux Volley Masters:

No.	Name	Date of birth	Height	Weight	Spike	Block	2015 club
2	Daria Talysheva	16 October 1991	1.82 m (6 ft 0 in)	67 kg (148 lb)	295 cm (116 in)	288 cm (113 in)	Dinamo Moscow
3	Ekaterina Efimova	3 July 1993	1.92 m (6 ft 4 in)	70 kg (150 lb)	305 cm (120 in)	295 cm (116 in)	Enisey Krasnoyarsk
4	Natalia Krotkova	1 July 1992	1.85 m (6 ft 1 in)	65 kg (143 lb)	305 cm (120 in)	295 cm (116 in)	Dinamo Moscow
6	Irina Koroleva	4 October 1991	1.96 m (6 ft 5 in)	78 kg (172 lb)	305 cm (120 in)	290 cm (110 in)	Dinamo-Kazan
7	Tatiana Romanova	9 September 1994	1.78 m (5 ft 10 in)	64 kg (141 lb)	292 cm (115 in)	285 cm (112 in)	Uralochka Ekaterinburg
8	Nataliya Goncharova	1 June 1989	1.94 m (6 ft 4 in)	75 kg (165 lb)	315 cm (124 in)	306 cm (120 in)	Dinamo Moscow
9	Alla Galkina	15 April 1992	1.78 m (5 ft 10 in)	65 kg (143 lb)	295 cm (116 in)	290 cm (110 in)	Proton – Saratov Reg.
11	Ekaterina Lyubushkina	2 January 1990	1.88 m (6 ft 2 in)	81 kg (179 lb)	305 cm (120 in)	301 cm (119 in)	Dinamo Moscow
13	Evgeniya Startseva C	12 February 1989	1.85 m (6 ft 1 in)	68 kg (150 lb)	294 cm (116 in)	290 cm (110 in)	Dinamo-Kazan
14	Irina Fetisova	7 September 1994	1.90 m (6 ft 3 in)	76 kg (168 lb)	307 cm (121 in)	286 cm (113 in)	Dinamo Moscow
16	Irina Voronkova	20 October 1995	1.90 m (6 ft 3 in)	84 kg (185 lb)	305 cm (120 in)	290 cm (110 in)	Dinamo Kazan
18	Ksenia Parubets	31 October 1994	1.83 m (6 ft 0 in)	64 kg (141 lb)	300 cm (120 in)	286 cm (113 in)	Uralochka – Ekaterinburg
20	Daria Malygina	4 April 1994	2.02 m (6 ft 8 in)	82 kg (181 lb)	317 cm (125 in)	305 cm (120 in)	Dinamo Kazan
21	Anna Kotikova	13 October 1999	1.85 m (6 ft 1 in)	71 kg (157 lb)	306 cm (120 in)	300 cm (120 in)	Dinamo Kazan

== Switzerland ==
The Swiss roster in the 2018 Montreux Volley Masters:

Head coach: Timo Lippuner

No.	Name	Date of birth	Height	Weight	Spike	Block	2017 club
2	Linda Kronenberg	6 October 1990	1.72 m (5 ft 8 in)	65 kg (143 lb)	290 cm (110 in)	280 cm (110 in)	(Switzerland) VFM Franches-Montagnes
3	Livia Zaugg	29 January 1996	1.80 m (5 ft 11 in)	65 kg (143 lb)	295 cm (116 in)	285 cm (112 in)	(Switzerland) Sm'Aesch Pfeffingen
4	Gabi Schottroff	8 February 1997	1.92 m (6 ft 4 in)	78 kg (172 lb)	302 cm (119 in)	285 cm (112 in)	(Switzerland) Volero Zürich
5	Korina Perkovac	7 July 1999	1.84 m (6 ft 0 in)	64 kg (141 lb)	293 cm (115 in)	250 cm (98 in)	(Switzerland) NVolley Nachwuchs Luzern
6	Madlaina Matter	19 October 1996	1.84 m (6 ft 0 in)	61 kg (134 lb)	309 cm (122 in)	290 cm (110 in)	(Switzerland) Sm'Aesch Pfeffingen
7	Méline Pierret	18 January 1999	1.75 m (5 ft 9 in)	61 kg (134 lb)	287 cm (113 in)	275 cm (108 in)	(Switzerland) Viteos NUC
8	Maja Storck	8 October 1998	1.84 m (6 ft 0 in)	72 kg (159 lb)	310 cm (120 in)	298 cm (117 in)	(Switzerland) Sm'Aesch Pfeffingen
13	Xenia Staffelbach	16 March 1998	1.85 m (6 ft 1 in)	72 kg (159 lb)	293 cm (115 in)	287 cm (113 in)	(Switzerland) Viteos NUC
14	Laura Künzler (C)	25 December 1996	1.89 m (6 ft 2 in)	69 kg (152 lb)	298 cm (117 in)	287 cm (113 in)	(Switzerland) Sm'Aesch Pfeffingen
16	Anika Schwörer	1 June 1996	1.80 m (5 ft 11 in)	78 kg (172 lb)	298 cm (117 in)	285 cm (112 in)	(Switzerland) Volley Smash 05
17	Annalea Maeder	1 March 1999	1.86 m (6 ft 1 in)	61 kg (134 lb)	294 cm (116 in)	282 cm (111 in)	(Switzerland) Volley Köniz
19	Thays Deprati	14 April 1992	1.72 m (5 ft 8 in)	65 kg (143 lb)	266 cm (105 in)	253 cm (100 in)	(Switzerland) Sm'Aesch Pfeffingen
21	Mathilde Engel	10 January 2002	1.66 m (5 ft 5 in)	61 kg (134 lb)	270 cm (110 in)	255 cm (100 in)	(Switzerland) VBC NUC
22	Samira Sulser	22 December 1995	1.87 m (6 ft 2 in)	70 kg (150 lb)	0 cm (0 in)	305 cm (120 in)	(Switzerland) Sm'Aesch Pfeffingen

== Turkey ==
The Turkish roster in the 2018 Montreux Volley Masters:

No.	Name	Date of birth	Height	Weight	Spike	Block	2015 club
1	Hatice Gizem Orge	26 April 1993	1.70 m (5 ft 7 in)	59 kg (130 lb)	270 cm (110 in)	260 cm (100 in)	Vakifbank
2	Simge Sebnem Akoz	23 April 1991	1.68 m (5 ft 6 in)	55 kg (121 lb)	250 cm (98 in)	245 cm (96 in)	Eczacibasi VitrA Istanbul
3	Cansu Ozbay	17 October 1996	1.82 m (6 ft 0 in)	75 kg (165 lb)	285 cm (112 in)	284 cm (112 in)	Vakifbank
4	Beyza Arici	27 July 1995	1.92 m (6 ft 4 in)	82 kg (181 lb)	302 cm (119 in)	293 cm (115 in)	Eczacibasi VitrA Istanbul
5	Seyma Ercan	5 July 1994	1.87 m (6 ft 2 in)	75 kg (165 lb)	302 cm (119 in)	295 cm (116 in)	T.H.Y.
7	Hande Baladin	1 September 1997	1.89 m (6 ft 2 in)	71 kg (157 lb)	310 cm (120 in)	300 cm (120 in)	Galatasaray
9	Meliha Ismailoglu	17 September 1993	1.88 m (6 ft 2 in)	70 kg (150 lb)	310 cm (120 in)	301 cm (119 in)	Eczacibasi
10	Çagla Akin	19 January 1995	1.77 m (5 ft 10 in)	70 kg (150 lb)	300 cm (120 in)	280 cm (110 in)	Vakifbank
13	Meryem Boz	3 February 1988	1.94 m (6 ft 4 in)	63 kg (139 lb)	315 cm (124 in)	310 cm (120 in)	Galatasaray
14	Eda Erdem Dündar C	22 June 1987	1.88 m (6 ft 2 in)	73 kg (161 lb)	311 cm (122 in)	305 cm (120 in)	Fenerbahce
15	Ebrar Karakurt	17 January 2000	1.94 m (6 ft 4 in)	72 kg (159 lb)	307 cm (121 in)	305 cm (120 in)	Vakifbank
18	Zehra Gunes	7 July 1999	1.94 m (6 ft 4 in)	82 kg (181 lb)	309 cm (122 in)	255 cm (100 in)	Vakifbank
20	Aylin Sarioglu	21 July 1995	1.68 m (5 ft 6 in)	67 kg (148 lb)	300 cm (120 in)	290 cm (110 in)	Nilüfer Belediye
