= 2019 Women's European Volleyball Championship squads =

This article shows all participating team squads at the 2019 Women's European Volleyball Championship, held in Hungary, Poland, Turkey and Slovakia from 23 August to 8 September 2019.

== Pool A ==
=== Finland ===
The following is the Finnish roster in the 2019 European Championship.

- Head coach: Tapio Kangasniemi

No.	Name	Date of birth	Height	Weight	Spike	Block	2019 club
1	Roosa Koskelo	20 August 1991 (aged 28)	1.65 m (5 ft 5 in)	59 kg (130 lb)	279 cm (110 in)	264 cm (104 in)	(Germany) Allianz MTV Stuttgart
3	Saara Esko	31 May 1980 (aged 39)	1.79 m (5 ft 10 in)	68 kg (150 lb)	310 cm (120 in)	290 cm (110 in)	—
4	Noora Kosonen	25 September 1993 (aged 25)	1.82 m (6 ft 0 in)	70 kg (150 lb)	307 cm (121 in)	292 cm (115 in)	(Finland) LP Viesti
5	Suvi Kokkonen	1 February 2000 (aged 19)	1.82 m (6 ft 0 in)	75 kg (165 lb)	302 cm (119 in)	287 cm (113 in)	(Finland) HPK Hämeenlinna
6	Krista Bjerregard-Madsen	28 December 1993 (aged 25)	1.83 m (6 ft 0 in)	79 kg (174 lb)	300 cm (120 in)	285 cm (112 in)	—
7	Emmi Riikilä	17 June 1999 (aged 20)	1.75 m (5 ft 9 in)	60 kg (130 lb)	285 cm (112 in)	265 cm (104 in)	(Finland) HPK Hämeenlinna
8	Kaisa Alanko	3 January 1993 (aged 26)	1.74 m (5 ft 9 in)	69 kg (152 lb)	288 cm (113 in)	273 cm (107 in)	(France) Volley-Ball Nantes
9	Katja Kylmäaho	21 April 1994 (aged 25)	1.72 m (5 ft 8 in)	65 kg (143 lb)	280 cm (110 in)	265 cm (104 in)	(Switzerland) Volley Lugano
10	Laura Pihlajamäki	15 August 1990 (aged 29)	1.94 m (6 ft 4 in)	82 kg (181 lb)	308 cm (121 in)	293 cm (115 in)	(Germany) VC Wiesbaden
11	Salla Karhu	9 April 1994 (aged 25)	1.78 m (5 ft 10 in)	74 kg (163 lb)	297 cm (117 in)	282 cm (111 in)	(France) Quimper Volley 29
12	Piia Korhonen	12 January 1997 (aged 22)	1.87 m (6 ft 2 in)	80 kg (180 lb)	311 cm (122 in)	296 cm (117 in)	(Germany) Dresdner SC
13	Anna Czakan	19 July 1996 (aged 23)	1.83 m (6 ft 0 in)	72 kg (159 lb)	300 cm (120 in)	285 cm (112 in)	(Finland) LP Viesti
14	Roosa Laakkonen	4 June 1994 (aged 25)	1.93 m (6 ft 4 in)	82 kg (181 lb)	314 cm (124 in)	299 cm (118 in)	(France) Évreux Volley-ball
16	Tiiamari Sievänen	19 July 1994 (aged 25)	1.68 m (5 ft 6 in)	62 kg (137 lb)	275 cm (108 in)	260 cm (100 in)	(Finland) LP Kangasala

=== Serbia ===
The following is the Serbian roster in the 2019 European Championship.

- Head coach: Zoran Terzić

No.	Name	Date of birth	Height	Weight	Spike	Block	2019 club
1	Bianka Buša	25 July 1994 (aged 25)	1.87 m (6 ft 2 in)	74 kg (163 lb)	312 cm (123 in)	298 cm (117 in)	(Poland) KPS Chemik Police
2	Katarina Lazović	12 September 1999 (aged 19)	1.83 m (6 ft 0 in)	66 kg (146 lb)	297 cm (117 in)	280 cm (110 in)	(Serbia) Vizura
5	Mina Popović	16 September 1994 (aged 24)	1.87 m (6 ft 2 in)	73 kg (161 lb)	315 cm (124 in)	305 cm (120 in)	(Italy) II Bisonte Firenze
8	Slađana Mirković	7 October 1995 (aged 23)	1.85 m (6 ft 1 in)	78 kg (172 lb)	293 cm (115 in)	283 cm (111 in)	(Poland) KPS Chemik Police
9	Brankica Mihajlović	13 April 1991 (aged 28)	1.90 m (6 ft 3 in)	83 kg (183 lb)	302 cm (119 in)	290 cm (110 in)	(Japan) JT Marvelous
10	Maja Ognjenović	6 August 1984 (aged 35)	1.83 m (6 ft 0 in)	67 kg (148 lb)	300 cm (120 in)	293 cm (115 in)	(Russia) Dynamo Moscow
11	Stefana Veljković	9 January 1990 (aged 29)	1.90 m (6 ft 3 in)	76 kg (168 lb)	325 cm (128 in)	310 cm (120 in)	(Italy) Igor Gorgonzola Novara
12	Teodora Pušić	12 March 1993 (aged 26)	1.70 m (5 ft 7 in)	58 kg (128 lb)	270 cm (110 in)	260 cm (100 in)	(Romania) UVT Agroland Timișoara
13	Ana Bjelica	3 April 1992 (aged 27)	1.90 m (6 ft 3 in)	78 kg (172 lb)	310 cm (120 in)	305 cm (120 in)	(France) Volero Le Cannet
14	Maja Aleksić	6 June 1997 (aged 22)	1.88 m (6 ft 2 in)	76 kg (168 lb)	302 cm (119 in)	290 cm (110 in)	(Romania) CSM Volei Alba Blaj
17	Silvija Popović	15 March 1986 (aged 33)	1.78 m (5 ft 10 in)	65 kg (143 lb)	286 cm (113 in)	276 cm (109 in)	(Kazakhstan) Altay VC
18	Tijana Bošković	8 March 1997 (aged 22)	1.94 m (6 ft 4 in)	84 kg (185 lb)	329 cm (130 in)	310 cm (120 in)	(Turkey) Eczacıbaşı VitrA
19	Bojana Milenković	6 March 1997 (aged 22)	1.85 m (6 ft 1 in)	70 kg (150 lb)	294 cm (116 in)	288 cm (113 in)	(Italy) Savino Del Bene Scandicci
20	Jelena Blagojević	1 December 1988 (aged 30)	1.81 m (5 ft 11 in)	67 kg (148 lb)	302 cm (119 in)	284 cm (112 in)	(Poland) Developres SkyRes Rzeszów

=== Turkey ===
The following is the Turkish roster in the 2019 European Championship.

- Head coach: (Italy) Giovanni Guidetti

No.	Name	Date of birth	Height	Weight	Spike	Block	2019 club
2	Simge Şebnem Aköz	23 April 1991 (aged 28)	1.68 m (5 ft 6 in)	56 kg (123 lb)	250 cm (98 in)	245 cm (96 in)	(Turkey) Eczacıbaşı VitrA
3	Cansu Özbay	17 October 1996 (aged 22)	1.82 m (6 ft 0 in)	78 kg (172 lb)	298 cm (117 in)	290 cm (110 in)	(Turkey) Vakıfbank Istanbul
5	Şeyma Ercan	5 July 1994 (aged 25)	1.87 m (6 ft 2 in)	73 kg (161 lb)	305 cm (120 in)	294 cm (116 in)	(Turkey) Beşiktaş JK
6	Kübra Akman	13 October 1994 (aged 24)	1.98 m (6 ft 6 in)	86 kg (190 lb)	310 cm (120 in)	310 cm (120 in)	(Turkey) Vakıfbank Istanbul
7	Hande Baladın	1 September 1997 (aged 21)	1.90 m (6 ft 3 in)	81 kg (179 lb)	309 cm (122 in)	300 cm (120 in)	(Turkey) Galatasaray S.K.
9	Meliha İsmailoğlu	17 September 1993 (aged 25)	1.88 m (6 ft 2 in)	73 kg (161 lb)	303 cm (119 in)	291 cm (115 in)	(Turkey) Eczacıbaşı VitrA
11	Naz Aydemir Akyol	14 August 1990 (aged 29)	1.86 m (6 ft 1 in)	67 kg (148 lb)	304 cm (120 in)	300 cm (120 in)	—
12	Gözde Yılmaz	9 September 1991 (aged 27)	1.94 m (6 ft 4 in)	79 kg (174 lb)	316 cm (124 in)	306 cm (120 in)	(Turkey) Eczacıbaşı VitrA
13	Meryem Boz	2 March 1988 (aged 31)	1.90 m (6 ft 3 in)	68 kg (150 lb)	323 cm (127 in)	313 cm (123 in)	(Turkey) Galatasaray S.K.
14	Eda Erdem Dündar	22 June 1987 (aged 32)	1.88 m (6 ft 2 in)	74 kg (163 lb)	307 cm (121 in)	297 cm (117 in)	(Turkey) Fenerbahçe
18	Zehra Güneş	7 July 1999 (aged 20)	1.97 m (6 ft 6 in)	88 kg (194 lb)	319 cm (126 in)	310 cm (120 in)	(Turkey) Vakıfbank Istanbul
20	Aylin Sarıoğlu	21 July 1995 (aged 24)	1.69 m (5 ft 7 in)	68 kg (150 lb)	300 cm (120 in)	290 cm (110 in)	(Turkey) Nilüfer Belediyespor
21	Fatma Yıldırım	3 January 1990 (aged 29)	1.80 m (5 ft 11 in)	64 kg (141 lb)	304 cm (120 in)	292 cm (115 in)	(Turkey) Fenerbahçe
99	Ebrar Karakurt	17 January 2000 (aged 19)	1.86 m (6 ft 1 in)	73 kg (161 lb)	315 cm (124 in)	304 cm (120 in)	(Turkey) Vakıfbank Istanbul

=== Bulgaria ===
The following is the Bulgarian roster in the 2019 European Championship.

- Head coach: Ivan Petkov

No.	Name	Date of birth	Height	Weight	Spike	Block	2019 club
1	Gergana Dimitrova	28 February 1996 (aged 23)	1.84 m (6 ft 0 in)	71 kg (157 lb)	305 cm (120 in)	288 cm (113 in)	(France) Volero Le Cannet
2	Nasya Dimitrova	6 November 1992 (aged 26)	1.89 m (6 ft 2 in)	70 kg (150 lb)	305 cm (120 in)	297 cm (117 in)	(Bulgaria) Maritza Plovdiv
3	Kristiana Petrova	13 July 1997 (aged 22)	1.80 m (5 ft 11 in)	60 kg (130 lb)	295 cm (116 in)	285 cm (112 in)	(Bulgaria) Levski Sofia
6	Miroslava Paskova	16 February 1996 (aged 23)	1.82 m (6 ft 0 in)	66 kg (146 lb)	297 cm (117 in)	289 cm (114 in)	(Bulgaria) Maritza Plovdiv
7	Lora Kitipova	19 May 1991 (aged 28)	1.82 m (6 ft 0 in)	69 kg (152 lb)	280 cm (110 in)	275 cm (108 in)	(Romania) CSM Volei Alba Blaj
8	Petya Barakova	18 June 1994 (aged 25)	1.78 m (5 ft 10 in)	71 kg (157 lb)	291 cm (115 in)	280 cm (110 in)	(Poland) Developres SkyRes Rzeszów
10	Mira Todorova	12 April 1994 (aged 25)	1.88 m (6 ft 2 in)	70 kg (150 lb)	299 cm (118 in)	291 cm (115 in)	(France) Volero Le Cannet
12	Mariya Karakasheva	27 October 1988 (aged 30)	1.82 m (6 ft 0 in)	67 kg (148 lb)	290 cm (110 in)	282 cm (111 in)	(Romania) CSM Volei Alba Blaj
14	Aleksandra Milanova	4 July 2001 (aged 18)	1.80 m (5 ft 11 in)	72 kg (159 lb)	290 cm (110 in)	281 cm (111 in)	(Bulgaria) Maritza Plovdiv
15	Zhana Todorova	6 January 1997 (aged 22)	1.70 m (5 ft 7 in)	55 kg (121 lb)	260 cm (100 in)	235 cm (93 in)	(Bulgaria) Maritza Plovdiv
16	Elitsa Vasileva	13 May 1990 (aged 29)	1.92 m (6 ft 4 in)	73 kg (161 lb)	305 cm (120 in)	295 cm (116 in)	(Italy) Savino Del Bene Scandicci
17	Elena Becheva	30 May 1998 (aged 21)	1.84 m (6 ft 0 in)	67 kg (148 lb)	298 cm (117 in)	289 cm (114 in)	(Bulgaria) Levski Sofia
20	Mariya Krivoshiyska	6 September 2001 (aged 17)	1.87 m (6 ft 2 in)	76 kg (168 lb)	295 cm (116 in)	285 cm (112 in)	(Bulgaria) Beroe Stara Zagora
23	Vangeliya Rachkovska	19 July 1997 (aged 22)	1.85 m (6 ft 1 in)	62 kg (137 lb)	300 cm (120 in)	280 cm (110 in)	(Bulgaria) Levski Sofia

=== Greece ===
The following is the Greek roster in the 2019 European Championship.

- Head coach: (Spain) Guillermo Naranjo Hernández

No.	Name	Date of birth	Height	Weight	Spike	Block	2019 club
2	Maria-Eleni Artakianou	21 May 1994 (aged 25)	1.70 m (5 ft 7 in)	62 kg (137 lb)	272 cm (107 in)	266 cm (105 in)	(Greece) A.O. Thiras
5	Maria Oikonomidou	18 August 1992 (aged 27)	1.83 m (6 ft 0 in)	73 kg (161 lb)	285 cm (112 in)	275 cm (108 in)	(Greece) Panathinaikos
6	Panagiota Dioti	13 November 1992 (aged 26)	1.85 m (6 ft 1 in)	69 kg (152 lb)	283 cm (111 in)	274 cm (108 in)	(Hungary) Vasas Óbuda
7	Tzina Lamprousi	27 January 1993 (aged 26)	1.85 m (6 ft 1 in)	65 kg (143 lb)	287 cm (113 in)	279 cm (110 in)	(Greece) Olympiacos
8	Areta Konomi	31 January 1989 (aged 30)	1.64 m (5 ft 5 in)	58 kg (128 lb)	245 cm (96 in)	238 cm (94 in)	(Greece) Olympiacos
9	Olga Strantzali	12 January 1996 (aged 23)	1.85 m (6 ft 1 in)	71 kg (157 lb)	298 cm (117 in)	275 cm (108 in)	(Poland) Enea PTPS Piła
10	Evangelia Merteki	29 April 1991 (aged 28)	1.90 m (6 ft 3 in)	75 kg (165 lb)	284 cm (112 in)	280 cm (110 in)	(Greece) A.O. Thiras
11	Anthí Vasilantonáki	9 April 1996 (aged 23)	1.96 m (6 ft 5 in)	80 kg (180 lb)	305 cm (120 in)	285 cm (112 in)	(Italy) Lardini Filottrano
12	Athina Papafotiou	23 August 1989 (aged 30)	1.81 m (5 ft 11 in)	67 kg (148 lb)	278 cm (109 in)	266 cm (105 in)	(France) ASPTT Mulhouse
13	Athanasia Totsidou	18 June 1989 (aged 30)	1.80 m (5 ft 11 in)	70 kg (150 lb)	286 cm (113 in)	280 cm (110 in)	(Greece) AEK
14	Stella Christodoulou	19 July 1991 (aged 28)	1.84 m (6 ft 0 in)	75 kg (165 lb)	285 cm (112 in)	280 cm (110 in)	(Greece) Olympiacos
16	Anna Kalantatze	13 August 1997 (aged 22)	1.80 m (5 ft 11 in)	62 kg (137 lb)	286 cm (113 in)	280 cm (110 in)	(Greece) A.O. Thiras
18	Melina Emmanouilidou	18 September 1994 (aged 24)	1.87 m (6 ft 2 in)	76 kg (168 lb)	283 cm (111 in)	275 cm (108 in)	(Greece) A.O. Thiras
20	Konstantina Vlachaki	18 May 1995 (aged 24)	1.79 m (5 ft 10 in)	66 kg (146 lb)	275 cm (108 in)	265 cm (104 in)	(Greece) Olympiacos

=== France ===
The following is the French roster in the 2019 European Championship.

- Head coach: Emile Rousseaux

No.	Name	Date of birth	Height	Weight	Spike	Block	2019 club
1	Héléna Cazaute	17 December 1997 (aged 21)	1.84 m (6 ft 0 in)	76 kg (168 lb)	305 cm (120 in)	285 cm (112 in)	(France) RC Cannes
3	Amandine Giardino	30 March 1995 (aged 24)	1.72 m (5 ft 8 in)	58 kg (128 lb)	275 cm (108 in)	260 cm (100 in)	(France) Volero Le Cannet
4	Christina Bauer	1 January 1988 (aged 31)	1.96 m (6 ft 5 in)	88 kg (194 lb)	323 cm (127 in)	308 cm (121 in)	(France) RC Cannes
5	Pauline Martin	20 October 1995 (aged 23)	1.88 m (6 ft 2 in)	69 kg (152 lb)	304 cm (120 in)	291 cm (115 in)	(Finland) HPK Hameenlinna
9	Nina Stojiljkovic	1 September 1996 (aged 22)	1.80 m (5 ft 11 in)	68 kg (150 lb)	285 cm (112 in)	274 cm (108 in)	(France) Quimper Volley 29
11	Lucille Gicquel	13 November 1997 (aged 21)	1.89 m (6 ft 2 in)	72 kg (159 lb)	305 cm (120 in)	290 cm (110 in)	(France) Volley-Ball Nantes
15	Amandha Marine Sylves	29 December 2000 (aged 18)	1.92 m (6 ft 4 in)	73 kg (161 lb)	321 cm (126 in)	295 cm (116 in)	France Avenir 2024
16	Juliette Fidon Leblou	28 October 1996 (aged 22)	1.85 m (6 ft 1 in)	86 kg (190 lb)	297 cm (117 in)	290 cm (110 in)	(France) Béziers Volley
17	Alexandra Dascalu	17 April 1991 (aged 28)	1.83 m (6 ft 0 in)	70 kg (150 lb)	294 cm (116 in)	283 cm (111 in)	(Italy) P2P Smilers Baronissi
22	Manon Moreels	22 March 2001 (aged 18)	1.78 m (5 ft 10 in)	70 kg (150 lb)	297 cm (117 in)	282 cm (111 in)	France Avenir 2024
23	Leandra Olinga-Andela	12 August 1997 (aged 22)	1.85 m (6 ft 1 in)	88 kg (194 lb)	307 cm (121 in)	300 cm (120 in)	(France) ASPTT Mulhouse
45	Odette Ndoye	25 August 1992 (aged 26)	1.78 m (5 ft 10 in)	70 kg (150 lb)	293 cm (115 in)	279 cm (110 in)	(France) Volley-Ball Nantes
59	Mallory Steux-Caleyron	24 October 1988 (aged 30)	1.71 m (5 ft 7 in)	62 kg (137 lb)	285 cm (112 in)	270 cm (110 in)	(France) Paris Saint-Cloud
99	Juliette Gelin	12 September 2000 (aged 18)	1.66 m (5 ft 5 in)	62 kg (137 lb)	288 cm (113 in)	273 cm (107 in)	France Avenir 2024

== Pool B ==
=== Ukraine ===
The following is the Ukrainian roster in the 2019 European Championship.

- Head coach: Gariy Yegiazarov

No.	Name	Date of birth	Height	Weight	Spike	Block	2019 club
2	Diana Karpets	6 August 1996 (aged 23)	1.89 m (6 ft 2 in)	60 kg (130 lb)	290 cm (110 in)	290 cm (110 in)	(Ukraine) Khimik Yuzhny
3	Iryna Trushkina	3 December 1986 (aged 32)	1.88 m (6 ft 2 in)	67 kg (148 lb)	285 cm (112 in)	290 cm (110 in)	(Romania) CSM București
4	Alla Politanska	27 September 1988 (aged 30)	1.85 m (6 ft 1 in)	74 kg (163 lb)	280 cm (110 in)	280 cm (110 in)	(Kazakhstan) Altay VC
5	Karyna Denysova	28 December 1997 (aged 21)	1.84 m (6 ft 0 in)	72 kg (159 lb)	290 cm (110 in)	300 cm (120 in)	(Slovakia) Strabag VC FTVŠ UK Bratislava
7	Svitlana Dorsman	11 December 1993 (aged 25)	1.84 m (6 ft 0 in)	65 kg (143 lb)	300 cm (120 in)	300 cm (120 in)	(Poland) KSZO Ostrowiec Świętokrzyski
8	Anastasiya Kraiduba	15 April 1995 (aged 24)	1.94 m (6 ft 4 in)	78 kg (172 lb)	220 cm (87 in)	219 cm (86 in)	(Russia) Yenisey Krasnoyarsk
9	Yuliya Gerasymova	15 September 1989 (aged 29)	1.88 m (6 ft 2 in)	70 kg (150 lb)	290 cm (110 in)	300 cm (120 in)	(Turkey) Karayolları Genel Müdürlüğü
11	Anna Stepaniuk	31 October 1992 (aged 26)	1.80 m (5 ft 11 in)	70 kg (150 lb)	275 cm (108 in)	280 cm (110 in)	(Indonesia) Jakarta Pertamina Energi
12	Anastasiya Karasova	21 January 1997 (aged 22)	1.75 m (5 ft 9 in)	57 kg (126 lb)	280 cm (110 in)	280 cm (110 in)	(Ukraine) Kontynium Volyn Lutsk
16	Nadiya Kodola	29 September 1988 (aged 30)	1.84 m (6 ft 0 in)	73 kg (161 lb)	290 cm (110 in)	290 cm (110 in)	(Romania) CSM București
17	Oleksandra Peretiatko	11 April 1984 (aged 35)	1.82 m (6 ft 0 in)	65 kg (143 lb)	275 cm (108 in)	275 cm (108 in)	(Russia) Yenisey Krasnoyarsk
18	Daria Velykokon	11 April 2002 (aged 17)	1.87 m (6 ft 2 in)	60 kg (130 lb)	280 cm (110 in)	280 cm (110 in)	(Ukraine) Khimik Yuzhny
21	Olesia Rykhliuk	11 December 1987 (aged 31)	1.96 m (6 ft 5 in)	68 kg (150 lb)	280 cm (110 in)	280 cm (110 in)	(Turkey) Beşiktaş JK
22	Viktoriya Nikolaichuk	12 September 2000 (aged 18)	1.82 m (6 ft 0 in)	65 kg (143 lb)	270 cm (110 in)	280 cm (110 in)	(Ukraine) Orbita ZTMC-ZNU Zaporozhye

=== Italy ===
The following is the Italian roster in the 2019 European Championship.

- Head coach: Davide Mazzanti

No.	Name	Date of birth	Height	Weight	Spike	Block	2019 club
1	Indre Sorokaite	2 July 1988 (aged 31)	1.86 m (6 ft 1 in)	81 kg (179 lb)	310 cm (120 in)	290 cm (110 in)	(Italy) Il Bisonte Firenze
5	Ofelia Malinov	29 February 1996 (aged 23)	1.84 m (6 ft 0 in)	67 kg (148 lb)	306 cm (120 in)	284 cm (112 in)	(Italy) Savino Del Bene Scandicci
6	Monica De Gennaro	8 January 1987 (aged 32)	1.72 m (5 ft 8 in)	62 kg (137 lb)	295 cm (116 in)	217 cm (85 in)	(Italy) Imoco Volley Conegliano
7	Raphaela Folie	7 March 1991 (aged 28)	1.85 m (6 ft 1 in)	69 kg (152 lb)	327 cm (129 in)	238 cm (94 in)	(Italy) Imoco Volley Conegliano
8	Alessia Orro	18 July 1998 (aged 21)	1.80 m (5 ft 11 in)	73 kg (161 lb)	305 cm (120 in)	279 cm (110 in)	(Italy) Unet E-Work Busto Arsizio
10	Cristina Chirichella	10 February 1994 (aged 25)	1.95 m (6 ft 5 in)	76 kg (168 lb)	320 cm (130 in)	301 cm (119 in)	(Italy) Igor Gorgonzola Novara
11	Anna Danesi	20 April 1996 (aged 23)	1.95 m (6 ft 5 in)	77 kg (170 lb)	312 cm (123 in)	246 cm (97 in)	(Italy) Imoco Volley Conegliano
13	Sarah Luisa Fahr	12 September 2001 (aged 17)	1.91 m (6 ft 3 in)	81 kg (179 lb)	314 cm (124 in)	302 cm (119 in)	(Italy) Club Italia Crai
15	Sylvia Chinelo Nwakalor	12 August 1999 (aged 20)	1.77 m (5 ft 10 in)	71 kg (157 lb)	318 cm (125 in)	296 cm (117 in)	(Italy) Club Italia Crai
16	Lucia Bosetti	9 July 1989 (aged 30)	1.76 m (5 ft 9 in)	61 kg (134 lb)	318 cm (125 in)	296 cm (117 in)	(Italy) Savino Del Bene Scandicci
17	Miriam Sylla	8 January 1995 (aged 24)	1.84 m (6 ft 0 in)	75 kg (165 lb)	320 cm (130 in)	239 cm (94 in)	(Italy) Imoco Volley Conegliano
18	Paola Egonu	18 December 1998 (aged 20)	1.90 m (6 ft 3 in)	79 kg (174 lb)	336 cm (132 in)	281 cm (111 in)	(Italy) Igor Gorgonzola Novara
20	Beatrice Parrocchiale	26 December 1995 (aged 23)	1.67 m (5 ft 6 in)	60 kg (130 lb)	290 cm (110 in)	272 cm (107 in)	(Italy) Il Bisonte Firenze
21	Terry Enweonwu	12 May 2000 (aged 19)	1.85 m (6 ft 1 in)	75 kg (165 lb)	326 cm (128 in)	304 cm (120 in)	(Italy) Club Italia Crai

=== Belgium ===
The following is the Belgian roster in the 2019 European Championship.

- Head coach: Gert Van de Broek

No.	Name	Date of birth	Height	Weight	Spike	Block	2019 club
2	Elise Van Sas	1 August 1997 (aged 22)	1.88 m (6 ft 2 in)	74 kg (163 lb)	296 cm (117 in)	281 cm (111 in)	(Belgium) VC Oudegem
3	Britt Herbots	24 September 1999 (aged 19)	1.82 m (6 ft 0 in)	63 kg (139 lb)	310 cm (120 in)	290 cm (110 in)	(Italy) Unet E-Work Busto Arsizio
4	Nathalie Lemmens	12 March 1995 (aged 24)	1.92 m (6 ft 4 in)	85 kg (187 lb)	311 cm (122 in)	288 cm (113 in)	(Germany) VC Wiesbaden
7	Celine Van Gestel	7 November 1997 (aged 21)	1.83 m (6 ft 0 in)	70 kg (150 lb)	310 cm (120 in)	280 cm (110 in)	(Belgium) Asterix Avo Beveren
8	Kaja Grobelna	4 January 1995 (aged 24)	1.88 m (6 ft 2 in)	72 kg (159 lb)	318 cm (125 in)	299 cm (118 in)	(Italy) Unet E-Work Busto Arsizio
10	Dominika Sobolska	3 December 1991 (aged 27)	1.87 m (6 ft 2 in)	83 kg (183 lb)	309 cm (122 in)	292 cm (115 in)	(Turkey) Çanakkale Belediyespor
11	Britt Ruysschaert	27 May 1994 (aged 25)	1.80 m (5 ft 11 in)	60 kg (130 lb)	302 cm (119 in)	281 cm (111 in)	(Belgium) Interfreight Antwerp
12	Dominika Strumilo	26 December 1996 (aged 22)	1.87 m (6 ft 2 in)	63 kg (139 lb)	311 cm (122 in)	292 cm (115 in)	(France) Vandœuvre Nancy Volley-Ball
13	Marlies Janssens	4 June 1997 (aged 22)	1.93 m (6 ft 4 in)	79 kg (174 lb)	312 cm (123 in)	299 cm (118 in)	(Belgium) Asterix Avo Beveren
16	Karolina Goliat	25 October 1996 (aged 22)	1.89 m (6 ft 2 in)	79 kg (174 lb)	308 cm (121 in)	295 cm (116 in)	(France) Saint-Raphael Var Volley-Ball
17	Ilka Van de Vyver	26 January 1993 (aged 26)	1.70 m (5 ft 7 in)	79 kg (174 lb)	296 cm (117 in)	273 cm (107 in)	(Germany) Rote Raben Vilsbiburg
19	Silke Van Avermaet	2 June 1999 (aged 20)	1.92 m (6 ft 4 in)	76 kg (168 lb)	311 cm (122 in)	290 cm (110 in)	(Belgium) Asterix Avo Beveren
20	Jodie Guilliams	26 April 1997 (aged 22)	1.80 m (5 ft 11 in)	73 kg (161 lb)	305 cm (120 in)	289 cm (114 in)	(Germany) Ladies in Black Aachen
21	Manon Stragier	12 March 1999 (aged 20)	1.82 m (6 ft 0 in)	69 kg (152 lb)	308 cm (121 in)	283 cm (111 in)	(Belgium) VDK Gent Dames

=== Portugal ===
The following is the Portuguese roster in the 2019 European Championship.

- Head coach: (Brazil) José Francisco Santos

No.	Name	Date of birth	Height	Weight	Spike	Block	2019 club
1	Amanda Cavalcanti	20 January 2002 (aged 17)	1.83 m (6 ft 0 in)	62 kg (137 lb)	284 cm (112 in)	260 cm (100 in)	(Portugal) AE Pedro Eanes Lobato
2	Eduarda Duarte	28 July 1993 (aged 26)	1.91 m (6 ft 3 in)	79 kg (174 lb)	310 cm (120 in)	295 cm (116 in)	(Portugal) Leixões SC
3	Maria Lopes	3 April 2002 (aged 17)	1.87 m (6 ft 2 in)	73 kg (161 lb)	260 cm (100 in)	250 cm (98 in)	(Portugal) Ala Nun'Alvares Gondomar
6	Helena Monteiro	7 February 1998 (aged 21)	1.81 m (5 ft 11 in)	70 kg (150 lb)	262 cm (103 in)	280 cm (110 in)	(Portugal) Castelo Maia DC
7	Eliana Durão	1 January 1997 (aged 22)	1.74 m (5 ft 9 in)	65 kg (143 lb)	275 cm (108 in)	270 cm (110 in)	(Portugal) Castelo Maia DC
8	Vanessa Rodrigues	28 December 1987 (aged 31)	1.82 m (6 ft 0 in)	70 kg (150 lb)	278 cm (109 in)	262 cm (103 in)	(Portugal) AVC Famalicão
10	Marta Hurst	7 July 1992 (aged 27)	1.84 m (6 ft 0 in)	78 kg (172 lb)	304 cm (120 in)	295 cm (116 in)	(Italy) Hermaea Olbia
11	Joana Resende	23 February 1991 (aged 28)	1.75 m (5 ft 9 in)	70 kg (150 lb)	295 cm (116 in)	285 cm (112 in)	(Portugal) AVC Famalicão
12	Beatriz Basto	31 August 2001 (aged 17)	1.59 m (5 ft 3 in)	55 kg (121 lb)	235 cm (93 in)	215 cm (85 in)	(Portugal) Leixões SC
14	Aline Rodrigues	5 September 1988 (aged 30)	1.92 m (6 ft 4 in)	78 kg (172 lb)	304 cm (120 in)	297 cm (117 in)	(Portugal) AVC Famalicão
15	Júlia Kavalenka	2 March 1999 (aged 20)	1.93 m (6 ft 4 in)	88 kg (194 lb)	290 cm (110 in)	285 cm (112 in)	(Italy) Bosca San Bernardo Cuneo
16	Maria Maio	17 May 1993 (aged 26)	1.90 m (6 ft 3 in)	83 kg (183 lb)	290 cm (110 in)	280 cm (110 in)	(Portugal) CF Belenenses
17	Bárbara Gomes	10 March 1996 (aged 23)	1.72 m (5 ft 8 in)	64 kg (141 lb)	275 cm (108 in)	270 cm (110 in)	(Portugal) AVC Famalicão
18	Ana Vale	14 January 2001 (aged 18)	1.84 m (6 ft 0 in)	68 kg (150 lb)	280 cm (110 in)	255 cm (100 in)	(Portugal) Ala Nun'Alvares Gondomar

=== Slovenia ===
The following is the Slovene roster in the 2019 European Championship.

- Head coach: (Italy) Alessandro Chiappini

No.	Name	Date of birth	Height	Weight	Spike	Block	2019 club
1	Eva Mori	13 March 1996 (aged 23)	1.87 m (6 ft 2 in)	74 kg (163 lb)	300 cm (120 in)	280 cm (110 in)	(France) Volero Le Cannet
2	Tina Grudina	3 December 1995 (aged 23)	1.82 m (6 ft 0 in)	74 kg (163 lb)	300 cm (120 in)	281 cm (111 in)	(Slovenia) Gen-I Volley Nova Gorica
3	Ana Marija Vovk	29 March 1998 (aged 21)	1.85 m (6 ft 1 in)	71 kg (157 lb)	299 cm (118 in)	279 cm (110 in)	(Slovenia) Formula Formis Rogoza
4	Leja Janežič	7 March 1993 (aged 26)	1.69 m (5 ft 7 in)	64 kg (141 lb)	260 cm (100 in)	250 cm (98 in)	(Slovenia) Calcit Kamnik
6	Zana Zdovc Sporer	22 March 2002 (aged 17)	1.88 m (6 ft 2 in)	65 kg (143 lb)	300 cm (120 in)	281 cm (111 in)	(Slovenia) Formula Formis Rogoza
7	Veronika Mikl	18 November 1999 (aged 19)	1.73 m (5 ft 8 in)	62 kg (137 lb)	269 cm (106 in)	254 cm (100 in)	(Slovenia) ŽOK Roto-Kema Puconci
8	Eva Zatkovič	2 August 2001 (aged 18)	1.92 m (6 ft 4 in)	75 kg (165 lb)	290 cm (110 in)	273 cm (107 in)	(Slovenia) Calcit Kamnik
9	Iza Mlakar	14 November 1995 (aged 23)	1.84 m (6 ft 0 in)	70 kg (150 lb)	301 cm (119 in)	283 cm (111 in)	(Slovenia) OK Nova KBM Branik
10	Sara Najdič	17 December 1994 (aged 24)	1.74 m (5 ft 9 in)	63 kg (139 lb)	280 cm (110 in)	258 cm (102 in)	(Slovenia) OK Nova KBM Branik
11	Ela Pintar	11 January 1996 (aged 23)	1.82 m (6 ft 0 in)	60 kg (130 lb)	293 cm (115 in)	278 cm (109 in)	(Slovenia) OK Nova KBM Branik
12	Lana Ščuka	6 October 1996 (aged 22)	1.86 m (6 ft 1 in)	70 kg (150 lb)	302 cm (119 in)	282 cm (111 in)	(Slovenia) Gen-I Volley Nova Gorica
16	Darja Eržen	20 June 1997 (aged 22)	1.88 m (6 ft 2 in)	78 kg (172 lb)	300 cm (120 in)	278 cm (109 in)	(Hungary) Vasas-Óbuda
18	Saša Planinšec	2 June 1995 (aged 24)	1.82 m (6 ft 0 in)	74 kg (163 lb)	302 cm (119 in)	280 cm (110 in)	(Germany) Dresdner SC
20	Monika Potokar	18 December 1987 (aged 31)	1.80 m (5 ft 11 in)	76 kg (168 lb)	300 cm (120 in)	275 cm (108 in)	(Poland) #VolleyWrocław

=== Poland ===
The following is the Polish roster in the 2019 European Championship.

- Head coach: Jacek Nawrocki

No.	Name	Date of birth	Height	Weight	Spike	Block	2019 club
2	Martyna Grajber	28 March 1995 (aged 24)	1.81 m (5 ft 11 in)	72 kg (159 lb)	284 cm (112 in)	305 cm (120 in)	(Poland) Chemik Police
3	Klaudia Alagierska	2 January 1996 (aged 23)	1.90 m (6 ft 3 in)	76 kg (168 lb)	297 cm (117 in)	285 cm (112 in)	(Poland) ŁKS Commercecon Łódź
5	Agnieszka Kąkolewska	17 October 1994 (aged 24)	1.99 m (6 ft 6 in)	85 kg (187 lb)	328 cm (129 in)	309 cm (122 in)	(Italy) Pomì Casalmaggiore
6	Martyna Łukasik	26 November 1999 (aged 19)	1.89 m (6 ft 2 in)	75 kg (165 lb)	305 cm (120 in)	288 cm (113 in)	(Poland) Chemik Police
8	Maria Stenzel	25 November 1998 (aged 20)	1.67 m (5 ft 6 in)	61 kg (134 lb)	275 cm (108 in)	264 cm (104 in)	(Poland) Grot Budowlani Łódź
9	Magdalena Stysiak	3 December 2000 (aged 18)	2.03 m (6 ft 8 in)	88 kg (194 lb)	308 cm (121 in)	300 cm (120 in)	(Poland) Chemik Police
10	Zuzanna Efimienko–Mlotkowska	8 August 1989 (aged 30)	1.97 m (6 ft 6 in)	72 kg (159 lb)	325 cm (128 in)	303 cm (119 in)	(Poland) ŁKS Commercecon Łódź
13	Paulina Maj-Erwardt	22 March 1987 (aged 32)	1.66 m (5 ft 5 in)	58 kg (128 lb)	277 cm (109 in)	255 cm (100 in)	(Poland) BKS Bielsko-Biała
14	Joanna Wołosz	7 April 1990 (aged 29)	1.81 m (5 ft 11 in)	65 kg (143 lb)	303 cm (119 in)	281 cm (111 in)	(Italy) Imoco Volley Conegliano
15	Aleksandra Wójcik	3 January 1994 (aged 25)	1.85 m (6 ft 1 in)	74 kg (163 lb)	305 cm (120 in)	290 cm (110 in)	(Poland) ŁKS Commercecon Łódź
16	Natalia Mędrzyk	13 January 1992 (aged 27)	1.84 m (6 ft 0 in)	74 kg (163 lb)	306 cm (120 in)	296 cm (117 in)	(Poland) Chemik Police
17	Malwina Smarzek	3 June 1996 (aged 23)	1.91 m (6 ft 3 in)	79 kg (174 lb)	318 cm (125 in)	305 cm (120 in)	(Italy) Zanetti Bergamo
18	Katarzyna Zaroślińska-Król	3 February 1987 (aged 32)	1.87 m (6 ft 2 in)	82 kg (181 lb)	322 cm (127 in)	300 cm (120 in)	(Poland) Developres SkyRes Rzeszów
20	Marlena Kowalewska	9 January 1992 (aged 27)	1.76 m (5 ft 9 in)	61 kg (134 lb)	291 cm (115 in)	285 cm (112 in)	(Poland) Chemik Police

== Pool C ==
=== Croatia ===
The following is the Croatian roster in the 2019 European Championship.

- Head coach: Daniele Santarelli

No.	Name	Date of birth	Height	Weight	Spike	Block	2019 club
1	Rene Sain	23 April 1997 (aged 22)	1.63 m (5 ft 4 in)	54 kg (119 lb)	264 cm (104 in)	250 cm (98 in)	(Germany) VfB Suhl Lotto Thüringen
2	Nika Stanović	2 October 1993 (aged 25)	1.80 m (5 ft 11 in)	65 kg (143 lb)	290 cm (110 in)	280 cm (110 in)	(Croatia) OK Kaštela
4	Božana Butigan	19 August 2000 (aged 19)	1.89 m (6 ft 2 in)	75 kg (165 lb)	305 cm (120 in)	280 cm (110 in)	(Croatia) HAOK Mladost
5	Nikolina Božičević	14 January 1995 (aged 24)	1.63 m (5 ft 4 in)	54 kg (119 lb)	215 cm (85 in)	210 cm (83 in)	(Finland) Pölkky Kuusamo
9	Lucija Mlinar	6 May 1995 (aged 24)	1.80 m (5 ft 11 in)	70 kg (150 lb)	295 cm (116 in)	280 cm (110 in)	(Germany) Dresdner SC
10	Matea Ikić	25 May 1989 (aged 30)	1.85 m (6 ft 1 in)	74 kg (163 lb)	305 cm (120 in)	295 cm (116 in)	(Kazakhstan) Altay VC
11	Sanja Popović	31 May 1984 (aged 35)	1.86 m (6 ft 1 in)	84 kg (185 lb)	325 cm (128 in)	310 cm (120 in)	(Romania) CSM Volei Alba Blaj
12	Beta Dumančić	26 March 1991 (aged 28)	1.90 m (6 ft 3 in)	80 kg (180 lb)	308 cm (121 in)	299 cm (118 in)	(Germany) Schweriner SC
13	Samanta Fabris	8 February 1992 (aged 27)	1.90 m (6 ft 3 in)	80 kg (180 lb)	318 cm (125 in)	304 cm (120 in)	(Russia) WVC Dynamo Kazan
14	Martina Šamadan	11 September 1993 (aged 25)	1.93 m (6 ft 4 in)	80 kg (180 lb)	310 cm (120 in)	305 cm (120 in)	(Germany) Allianz MTV Stuttgart
15	Bernarda Brčić	12 May 1991 (aged 28)	1.92 m (6 ft 4 in)	78 kg (172 lb)	305 cm (120 in)	300 cm (120 in)	(France) ASPTT Mulhouse
17	Lea Deak	27 April 2000 (aged 19)	1.78 m (5 ft 10 in)	62 kg (137 lb)	268 cm (106 in)	255 cm (100 in)	(Croatia) OK Olimpik
18	Karla Klarić	5 September 1994 (aged 24)	1.90 m (6 ft 3 in)	82 kg (181 lb)	308 cm (121 in)	300 cm (120 in)	(Hungary) Békéscsabai RSE

=== Hungary ===
The following is the Hungarian roster in the 2019 European Championship.

- Head coach: (Belgium) Jan De Brandt

No.	Name	Date of birth	Height	Weight	Spike	Block	2019 club
1	Gréta Szakmáry	31 December 1991 (aged 27)	1.86 m (6 ft 1 in)	71 kg (157 lb)	301 cm (119 in)	290 cm (110 in)	(Germany) SSC Palmberg Schwerin
2	Fruzsina Tóth	30 December 1999 (aged 19)	1.64 m (5 ft 5 in)	62 kg (137 lb)	250 cm (98 in)	240 cm (94 in)	(Hungary) Fatum Nyíregyháza
5	Rita Molcsányi	1 November 1993 (aged 25)	1.70 m (5 ft 7 in)	60 kg (130 lb)	275 cm (108 in)	260 cm (100 in)	(Hungary) Békéscsabai RSE
6	Zsófia Gyimes	14 August 1996 (aged 23)	1.82 m (6 ft 0 in)	64 kg (141 lb)	296 m (11,700 in)	288 cm (113 in)	(United States) Kansas State University
7	Renáta Sándor	15 December 1990 (aged 28)	1.83 m (6 ft 0 in)	69 kg (152 lb)	305 cm (120 in)	292 cm (115 in)	(Germany) Allianz MTV Stuttgart
8	Zsuzsanna Tálas	9 July 1993 (aged 26)	1.75 m (5 ft 9 in)	68 kg (150 lb)	289 cm (114 in)	275 cm (108 in)	(Hungary) Békéscsabai RSE
9	Bernadett Dékány	30 June 1992 (aged 27)	1.87 m (6 ft 2 in)	76 kg (168 lb)	301 cm (119 in)	280 cm (110 in)	(Hungary) Vasas Óbuda
11	Kata Török	26 May 1998 (aged 21)	1.82 m (6 ft 0 in)	66 kg (146 lb)	302 cm (119 in)	290 cm (110 in)	(Hungary) Vasas Óbuda
14	Anett Németh	13 December 1999 (aged 19)	1.86 m (6 ft 1 in)	73 kg (161 lb)	296 cm (117 in)	287 cm (113 in)	(United States) Coastal Carolina University
15	Rita Liliom Rita Liliom	23 May 1986 (aged 33)	1.84 m (6 ft 0 in)	73 kg (161 lb)	295 cm (116 in)	280 cm (110 in)	(Hungary) Újpesti TE
16	Eszter Nagy	1 November 1991 (aged 27)	1.87 m (6 ft 2 in)	84 kg (185 lb)	305 cm (120 in)	288 cm (113 in)	(Germany) Rote Raben Vilsbiburg
17	Réka Bleicher	15 October 1995 (aged 23)	1.87 m (6 ft 2 in)	68 kg (150 lb)	299 cm (118 in)	286 cm (113 in)	(Hungary) Újpesti TE
18	Eszter Anna Pekárik	8 December 1996 (aged 22)	1.90 m (6 ft 3 in)	85 kg (187 lb)	300 cm (120 in)	290 cm (110 in)	(Hungary) Békéscsabai RSE
22	Zsanett Miklai	16 February 1992 (aged 27)	1.88 m (6 ft 2 in)	81 kg (179 lb)	298 cm (117 in)	288 cm (113 in)	(Hungary) MCM-Diamant KE

=== Estonia ===
The following is the Estonian roster in the 2019 European Championship.

- Head coach: Andrei Ojamets

No.	Name	Date of birth	Height	Weight	Spike	Block	2019 club
1	Nette Peit	27 March 1992 (aged 27)	1.77 m (5 ft 10 in)	69 kg (152 lb)	300 cm (120 in)	275 cm (108 in)	(Finland) LP Kangasala
2	Kaisa Bahmatsev	30 July 1994 (aged 25)	1.74 m (5 ft 9 in)	81 kg (179 lb)	273 cm (107 in)	260 cm (100 in)	(Belgium) Oxyjeunes Farciennes
3	Julija Mõnnakmäe	7 November 1990 (aged 28)	1.77 m (5 ft 10 in)	62 kg (137 lb)	295 cm (116 in)	275 cm (108 in)	(France) Vandoeuvre Nancy Volley-Ball
4	Kristiine Miilen	4 December 1996 (aged 22)	1.83 m (6 ft 0 in)	75 kg (165 lb)	308 cm (121 in)	296 cm (117 in)	(France) Terville Florange OC
5	Liis Kullerkann	2 May 1991 (aged 28)	1.91 m (6 ft 3 in)	76 kg (168 lb)	316 cm (124 in)	298 cm (117 in)	(France) Vandoeuvre Nancy Volley-Ball
7	Eliise Hollas	29 December 1993 (aged 25)	1.85 m (6 ft 1 in)	78 kg (172 lb)	302 cm (119 in)	290 cm (110 in)	(France) Terville Florange OC
8	Eliisa Peit	27 March 1991 (aged 28)	1.82 m (6 ft 0 in)	65 kg (143 lb)	295 cm (116 in)	280 cm (110 in)	(Finland) LP Vampula
9	Anu Ennok	25 January 1991 (aged 28)	1.75 m (5 ft 9 in)	76 kg (168 lb)	302 cm (119 in)	290 cm (110 in)	(France) Vandoeuvre Nancy Volley-Ball
10	Hanna Pajula	12 June 1998 (aged 21)	1.78 m (5 ft 10 in)	75 kg (165 lb)	289 cm (114 in)	273 cm (107 in)	(Belgium) Oxyjeunes Farciennes
11	Kertu Laak	21 February 1998 (aged 21)	1.88 m (6 ft 2 in)	82 kg (181 lb)	305 cm (120 in)	293 cm (115 in)	(Finland) LP Viesti
12	Kristi Nõlvak	30 May 1989 (aged 30)	1.71 m (5 ft 7 in)	64 kg (141 lb)	275 cm (108 in)	262 cm (103 in)	(Estonia) TalTech/Tradehouse
14	Ingrid Kiisk	9 February 1998 (aged 21)	1.82 m (6 ft 0 in)	69 kg (152 lb)	282 cm (111 in)	270 cm (110 in)	(Estonia) Tartu Ülikool/Bigbank
15	Kristel Moor	20 February 1994 (aged 25)	1.88 m (6 ft 2 in)	82 kg (181 lb)	305 cm (120 in)	295 cm (116 in)	(France) Terville Florange OC
17	Nathalie Anett Haidla	1 September 2001 (aged 17)	1.63 m (5 ft 4 in)	55 kg (121 lb)	264 cm (104 in)	255 cm (100 in)	(Estonia) Tallina Ülikool

=== Romania ===
The following is the Romanian roster in the 2019 European Championship.

- Head coach: (Italy) Luciano Pedullà

No.	Name	Date of birth	Height	Weight	Spike	Block	2019 club
1	Ioana Baciu	4 January 1990 (aged 29)	1.84 m (6 ft 0 in)	69 kg (152 lb)	305 cm (120 in)	295 cm (116 in)	(Romania) CSM Volei Alba Blaj
2	Denisa Rogojinaru	16 May 1985 (aged 34)	1.85 m (6 ft 1 in)	73 kg (161 lb)	300 cm (120 in)	290 cm (110 in)	(Romania) CS Știința Bacău
3	Rodica Buterez	25 July 1999 (aged 20)	1.86 m (6 ft 1 in)	70 kg (150 lb)	294 cm (116 in)	280 cm (110 in)	(Romania) CSM Târgoviște
4	Diana Balintoni	19 April 1988 (aged 31)	1.73 m (5 ft 8 in)	63 kg (139 lb)	278 cm (109 in)	260 cm (100 in)	(Romania) CSM Lugoj
5	Ramona Rus	8 October 1996 (aged 22)	1.80 m (5 ft 11 in)	73 kg (161 lb)	297 cm (117 in)	291 cm (115 in)	(Romania) CSM Volei Alba Blaj
6	Mihaela Albu	1 January 1994 (aged 25)	1.68 m (5 ft 6 in)	52 kg (115 lb)	264 cm (104 in)	258 cm (102 in)	(Romania) CS Medgidia
7	Roxana Iancu	14 August 1993 (aged 26)	1.85 m (6 ft 1 in)	60 kg (130 lb)	296 cm (117 in)	285 cm (112 in)	(Romania) CS Dinamo București
8	Adelina Budăi-Ungureanu	29 July 2000 (aged 19)	1.87 m (6 ft 2 in)	73 kg (161 lb)	307 cm (121 in)	290 cm (110 in)	(Romania) CSM București
9	Diana Calotă	24 May 1986 (aged 33)	1.79 m (5 ft 10 in)	63 kg (139 lb)	290 cm (110 in)	280 cm (110 in)	(Romania) CSM Târgoviște
10	Alexandra Trică	21 October 1985 (aged 33)	1.83 m (6 ft 0 in)	70 kg (150 lb)	300 cm (120 in)	285 cm (112 in)	(Romania) CSM Târgoviște
11	Roxana Tucmeanu	21 April 1998 (aged 21)	1.64 m (5 ft 5 in)	65 kg (143 lb)	264 cm (104 in)	250 cm (98 in)	(Romania) CS Dinamo București
12	Georgiana Faleș	4 February 1986 (aged 33)	1.86 m (6 ft 1 in)	75 kg (165 lb)	305 cm (120 in)	290 cm (110 in)	(Romania) CS Știința Bacău
15	Alexandra Ciucu	13 November 1995 (aged 23)	1.65 m (5 ft 5 in)	55 kg (121 lb)	260 cm (100 in)	250 cm (98 in)	(Romania) CS Știința Bacău
18	Nneka Onyejekwe	18 August 1989 (aged 30)	1.88 m (6 ft 2 in)	74 kg (163 lb)	319 cm (126 in)	301 cm (119 in)	(Romania) CSM Volei Alba Blaj

=== Azerbaijan ===
The following is the Azerbaijan roster in the 2019 European Championship.

- Head coach: (Italy) Giovanni Caprara

No.	Name	Date of birth	Height	Weight	Spike	Block	2019 club
2	Yana Azimova	5 July 1994 (aged 25)	1.75 m (5 ft 9 in)	63 kg (139 lb)	295 cm (116 in)	285 cm (112 in)	(Azerbaijan) Azerrail Baku
5	Odina Aliyeva	22 May 1990 (aged 29)	1.84 m (6 ft 0 in)	80 kg (180 lb)	317 cm (125 in)	305 cm (120 in)	(Italy) Fenera Chieri
6	Ayshan Abdulazimova	11 April 1993 (aged 26)	1.85 m (6 ft 1 in)	62 kg (137 lb)	315 cm (124 in)	305 cm (120 in)	(Hungary) Vasas SC
7	Olena Hasanova	25 November 1995 (aged 23)	1.88 m (6 ft 2 in)	72 kg (159 lb)	305 cm (120 in)	285 cm (112 in)	(France) Volero Le Cannet
8	Yelyzaveta Samadova	3 March 1995 (aged 24)	1.84 m (6 ft 0 in)	68 kg (150 lb)	318 cm (125 in)	305 cm (120 in)	(Russia) Leningradka Saint Petersburg
9	Anastasiya Bezsonova	21 December 1999 (aged 19)	1.87 m (6 ft 2 in)	71 kg (157 lb)	303 cm (119 in)	286 cm (113 in)	(Slovenia) OK Nova KBM Branik
14	Krystsina Yagubova	13 February 1996 (aged 23)	1.84 m (6 ft 0 in)	69 kg (152 lb)	300 cm (120 in)	295 cm (116 in)	(Finland) LP Viesti
17	Polina Rahimova	5 June 1990 (aged 29)	1.98 m (6 ft 6 in)	87 kg (192 lb)	330 cm (130 in)	305 cm (120 in)	(Turkey) Türk Hava Yolları SK
18	Shafagat Alishanova	3 August 1991 (aged 28)	1.78 m (5 ft 10 in)	70 kg (150 lb)	305 cm (120 in)	300 cm (120 in)	(Poland) E.Leclerc Radomka Radom
19	Bayaz Aliyeva	9 June 1990 (aged 29)	1.78 m (5 ft 10 in)	65 kg (143 lb)	293 cm (115 in)	297 cm (117 in)	(Azerbaijan) Azerrail Baku
20	Margarita Stepanenko	25 April 1993 (aged 26)	1.87 m (6 ft 2 in)	70 kg (150 lb)	315 cm (124 in)	300 cm (120 in)	(Poland) Enea PTPS Piła
22	Mariya Kirilyuk	16 February 1995 (aged 24)	1.95 m (6 ft 5 in)	80 kg (180 lb)	309 cm (122 in)	300 cm (120 in)	(Azerbaijan) Azerrail Baku

=== Netherlands ===
The following is the Dutch roster in the 2019 European Championship.

- Head coach: (United States) Jamie Morrison

No.	Name	Date of birth	Height	Weight	Spike	Block	2019 club
1	Kirsten Knip	14 September 1992 (aged 26)	1.76 m (5 ft 9 in)	73 kg (161 lb)	281 cm (111 in)	275 cm (108 in)	(Germany) Ladies in Black Aachen
3	Yvon Beliën	28 December 1993 (aged 25)	1.88 m (6 ft 2 in)	70 kg (150 lb)	310 cm (120 in)	300 cm (120 in)	(Turkey) Beşiktaş JK
4	Celeste Plak	26 October 1995 (aged 23)	1.90 m (6 ft 3 in)	84 kg (185 lb)	314 cm (124 in)	302 cm (119 in)	(Italy) Igor Gorgonzola Novara
5	Robin de Kruijf	5 May 1991 (aged 28)	1.93 m (6 ft 4 in)	79 kg (174 lb)	313 cm (123 in)	300 cm (120 in)	(Italy) Imoco Volley Conegliano
6	Maret Balkestein-Grothues	16 September 1988 (aged 30)	1.84 m (6 ft 0 in)	74 kg (163 lb)	290 cm (110 in)	280 cm (110 in)	(Romania) CSM București
7	Juliët Lohuis	10 September 1996 (aged 22)	1.90 m (6 ft 3 in)	77 kg (170 lb)	305 cm (120 in)	295 cm (116 in)	(Germany) USC Münster
9	Myrthe Schoot	29 August 1988 (aged 30)	1.83 m (6 ft 0 in)	70 kg (150 lb)	298 cm (117 in)	286 cm (113 in)	(Germany) Rote Raben Vilsbiburg
10	Lonneke Slöetjes	15 November 1990 (aged 28)	1.92 m (6 ft 4 in)	76 kg (168 lb)	322 cm (127 in)	315 cm (124 in)	(Turkey) Vakıfbank Istanbul
11	Anne Buijs	2 December 1991 (aged 27)	1.91 m (6 ft 3 in)	75 kg (165 lb)	317 cm (125 in)	299 cm (118 in)	(Italy) Saugella Team Monza
12	Britt Bongaerts	3 November 1996 (aged 22)	1.85 m (6 ft 1 in)	68 kg (150 lb)	296 cm (117 in)	284 cm (112 in)	(Germany) Palmberg Schwerin
14	Laura Dijkema	18 February 1990 (aged 29)	1.84 m (6 ft 0 in)	70 kg (150 lb)	297 cm (117 in)	279 cm (110 in)	(Italy) Il Bisonte Firenze
18	Marrit Jasper	28 February 1996 (aged 23)	1.79 m (5 ft 10 in)	75 kg (165 lb)	300 cm (120 in)	292 cm (115 in)	(Germany) Ladies in Black Aachen
19	Nika Daalderop	29 November 1998 (aged 20)	1.89 m (6 ft 2 in)	72 kg (159 lb)	317 cm (125 in)	308 cm (121 in)	(Italy) Il Bisonte Firenze
22	Nicole Koolhaas	31 January 1991 (aged 28)	1.98 m (6 ft 6 in)	77 kg (170 lb)	310 cm (120 in)	300 cm (120 in)	(Romania) CSM București

== Pool D ==
=== Slovakia ===
The following is the Slovak roster in the 2019 European Championship.

- Head coach: (Italy) Marco Fenoglio

No.	Name	Date of birth	Height	Weight	Spike	Block	2019 club
2	Barbora Koseková	22 November 1994 (aged 24)	1.78 m (5 ft 10 in)	71 kg (157 lb)	280 cm (110 in)	268 cm (106 in)	(Slovakia) Pezinok
3	Romana Hudecová	21 September 1993 (aged 25)	1.78 m (5 ft 10 in)	63 kg (139 lb)	310 cm (120 in)	294 cm (116 in)	(Slovakia) BVK Bratislava
4	Veronika Hrončeková	2 January 1990 (aged 29)	1.92 m (6 ft 4 in)	71 kg (157 lb)	315 cm (124 in)	295 cm (116 in)	(Slovakia) BVK Bratislava
6	Karin Palgutová	12 February 1993 (aged 26)	1.86 m (6 ft 1 in)	79 kg (174 lb)	303 cm (119 in)	292 cm (115 in)	(France) Quimper Volley 29
7	Michaela Španková	1 August 1999 (aged 20)	1.69 m (5 ft 7 in)	63 kg (139 lb)	281 cm (111 in)	262 cm (103 in)	(Slovakia) BVK Bratislava
8	Miroslava Kijaková	5 May 1988 (aged 31)	1.80 m (5 ft 11 in)	69 kg (152 lb)	305 cm (120 in)	295 cm (116 in)	(Cyprus) Anorthosis Famagusta
9	Jaroslava Pencová	24 June 1990 (aged 29)	1.91 m (6 ft 3 in)	81 kg (179 lb)	308 cm (121 in)	295 cm (116 in)	(Poland) Budowlani Łódź
10	Nina Herelová	30 July 1993 (aged 26)	1.84 m (6 ft 0 in)	70 kg (150 lb)	296 cm (117 in)	286 cm (113 in)	(Poland) Bielsko-Biała
12	Nikola Radosová	3 May 1992 (aged 27)	1.86 m (6 ft 1 in)	66 kg (146 lb)	310 cm (120 in)	295 cm (116 in)	(Germany) Dresdner SC
13	Lenka Ovečková	16 November 1995 (aged 23)	1.75 m (5 ft 9 in)	69 kg (152 lb)	291 cm (115 in)	280 cm (110 in)	(Slovakia) BVK Bratislava
14	Sandra Szabóová	22 July 1996 (aged 23)	1.90 m (6 ft 3 in)	71 kg (157 lb)	300 cm (120 in)	288 cm (113 in)	(Germany) Potsdam
15	Karolína Fričová	29 April 2000 (aged 19)	1.79 m (5 ft 10 in)	67 kg (148 lb)	297 cm (117 in)	282 cm (111 in)	(Slovakia) Slávia Bratislava
16	Skarleta Jančová	16 January 1997 (aged 22)	1.67 m (5 ft 6 in)	58 kg (128 lb)	279 cm (110 in)	258 cm (102 in)	(Slovakia) BVK Bratislava
22	Mária Kostelanská	8 January 1993 (aged 26)	1.75 m (5 ft 9 in)	68 kg (150 lb)	287 cm (113 in)	280 cm (110 in)	(Hungary) Vasas Budapest

=== Germany ===
The following is the German roster in the 2019 European Championship.

- Head coach: Felix Koslowski

No.	Name	Date of birth	Height	Weight	Spike	Block	2019 club
2	Pia Kästner	29 June 1998 (aged 21)	1.82 m (6 ft 0 in)	68 kg (150 lb)	297 cm (117 in)	286 cm (113 in)	(Germany) Stuttgart
3	Denise Hanke	31 August 1989 (aged 29)	1.79 m (5 ft 10 in)	58 kg (128 lb)	284 cm (112 in)	272 cm (107 in)	(Germany) SSC Palmberg Schwerin
5	Jana Franziska Poll	7 May 1988 (aged 31)	1.85 m (6 ft 1 in)	69 kg (152 lb)	310 cm (120 in)	290 cm (110 in)	(Germany) Allianz MTV Stuttgart
6	Jennifer Geerties	5 April 1994 (aged 25)	1.84 m (6 ft 0 in)	58 kg (128 lb)	298 cm (117 in)	288 cm (113 in)	(Germany) SSC Palmberg Schwerin
8	Kimberly Drewniok	11 August 1997 (aged 22)	1.88 m (6 ft 2 in)	73 kg (161 lb)	311 cm (122 in)	298 cm (117 in)	(Germany) Wiesbaden
9	Lina Alsmeier	29 June 2000 (aged 19)	1.89 m (6 ft 2 in)	70 kg (150 lb)	305 cm (120 in)	290 cm (110 in)	(Germany) USC Münster
10	Lena Stigrot	20 December 1994 (aged 24)	1.84 m (6 ft 0 in)	68 kg (150 lb)	303 cm (119 in)	295 cm (116 in)	(Germany) Rote Raben Vilsbiburg
11	Louisa Lippmann	23 September 1994 (aged 24)	1.91 m (6 ft 3 in)	78 kg (172 lb)	319 cm (126 in)	312 cm (123 in)	(Germany) SSC Palmberg Schwerin
14	Marie Schölzel	1 August 1997 (aged 22)	1.88 m (6 ft 2 in)	66 kg (146 lb)	307 cm (121 in)	299 cm (118 in)	(Germany) SSC Palmberg Schwerin
16	Linda Bock	27 May 2000 (aged 19)	1.72 m (5 ft 8 in)	60 kg (130 lb)	278 cm (109 in)	270 cm (110 in)	(Germany) USC Münster
17	Anna Pogany	21 July 1994 (aged 25)	1.70 m (5 ft 7 in)	60 kg (130 lb)	280 cm (110 in)	270 cm (110 in)	(Germany) SSC Palmberg Schwerin
19	Ivana Vanjak	30 May 1995 (aged 24)	1.90 m (6 ft 3 in)	70 kg (150 lb)	315 cm (124 in)	306 cm (120 in)	(Germany) Münster
21	Camilla Weitzel	11 June 2000 (aged 19)	1.95 m (6 ft 5 in)	82 kg (181 lb)	305 cm (120 in)	289 cm (114 in)	(Germany) Dresdner SC
22	Lisa Gründing	2 December 1991 (aged 27)	1.85 m (6 ft 1 in)	75 kg (165 lb)	302 cm (119 in)	294 cm (116 in)	(Germany) SC Potsdam

=== Switzerland ===
The following is the Swiss roster in the 2019 European Championship.

- Head coach: Timothy Lippuner

No.	Name	Date of birth	Height	Weight	Spike	Block	2019 club
1	Julie Lengweiler	6 November 1998 (aged 20)	1.86 m (6 ft 1 in)	70 kg (150 lb)	302 cm (119 in)	285 cm (112 in)	(Switzerland) Viteos NUC
3	Livia Zaugg	29 January 1996 (aged 23)	1.80 m (5 ft 11 in)	65 kg (143 lb)	295 cm (116 in)	285 cm (112 in)	(Switzerland) Sm'Aesch Pfeffingen
4	Gabi Schottroff	8 February 1997 (aged 22)	1.92 m (6 ft 4 in)	78 kg (172 lb)	302 cm (119 in)	285 cm (112 in)	(Switzerland) Sm'Aesch Pfeffingen
5	Thays Deprati	14 April 1992 (aged 27)	1.72 m (5 ft 8 in)	65 kg (143 lb)	266 m (10,500 in)	253 cm (100 in)	(Switzerland) TSV Düdingen
6	Madlaina Matter	19 October 1996 (aged 22)	1.83 m (6 ft 0 in)	61 kg (134 lb)	309 cm (122 in)	290 cm (110 in)	(Switzerland) Sm'Aesch Pfeffingen
7	Méline Pierret	18 January 1999 (aged 20)	1.75 m (5 ft 9 in)	61 kg (134 lb)	287 cm (113 in)	275 cm (108 in)	(Switzerland) Viteos NUC
8	Maja Storck	8 October 1998 (aged 20)	1.84 m (6 ft 0 in)	72 kg (159 lb)	310 cm (120 in)	298 cm (117 in)	(Germany) Ladies in Black Aachen
9	Sarina Brunner	8 July 1997 (aged 22)	1.78 m (5 ft 10 in)	64 kg (141 lb)	298 cm (117 in)	285 cm (112 in)	(Switzerland) TSV Düdingen
10	Samira Sulser	22 December 1995 (aged 23)	1.87 m (6 ft 2 in)	70 kg (150 lb)	290 cm (110 in)	305 cm (120 in)	(Switzerland) TSV Düdingen
11	Sarah Trösch	28 September 1994 (aged 24)	1.76 m (5 ft 9 in)	70 kg (150 lb)	280 cm (110 in)	270 cm (110 in)	(Switzerland) Viteos NUC
13	Xenia Staffelbach	16 March 1998 (aged 21)	1.89 m (6 ft 2 in)	72 kg (159 lb)	293 cm (115 in)	287 cm (113 in)	(Switzerland) Viteos NUC
14	Laura Künzler	25 December 1996 (aged 22)	1.89 m (6 ft 2 in)	69 kg (152 lb)	305 cm (120 in)	292 cm (115 in)	(Germany) Rote Raben Vilsbiburg
20	Olivia Wassner	22 March 1999 (aged 20)	1.86 m (6 ft 1 in)	70 kg (150 lb)	297 cm (117 in)	290 cm (110 in)	(United States) American University
21	Mathilde Engel	10 January 2002 (aged 17)	1.66 m (5 ft 5 in)	61 kg (134 lb)	270 cm (110 in)	255 cm (100 in)	—

=== Russia ===
The following is the Russian roster in the 2019 European Championship.

- Head coach: Vadim Pankov

No.	Name	Date of birth	Height	Weight	Spike	Block	2019 club
1	Angelina Lazarenko	13 April 1998 (aged 21)	1.92 m (6 ft 4 in)	76 kg (168 lb)	320 cm (130 in)	305 cm (120 in)	(France) Volero Le Cannet
3	Ekaterina Efimova	3 July 1993 (aged 26)	1.92 m (6 ft 4 in)	70 kg (150 lb)	305 cm (120 in)	295 cm (116 in)	(Russia) Dynamo Moscow
4	Daria Chikrizova	9 June 1990 (aged 29)	1.76 m (5 ft 9 in)	70 kg (150 lb)	283 cm (111 in)	280 cm (110 in)	(Russia) Dynamo-Metar Chelyabinsk
6	Irina Koroleva	10 April 1991 (aged 28)	1.96 m (6 ft 5 in)	78 kg (172 lb)	315 cm (124 in)	305 cm (120 in)	(Russia) Dynamo Kazan
7	Tatiana Romanova	9 September 1994 (aged 24)	1.83 m (6 ft 0 in)	73 kg (161 lb)	290 cm (110 in)	285 cm (112 in)	(Russia) Uralochka-NTMK
8	Nataliya Goncharova	1 June 1989 (aged 30)	1.96 m (6 ft 5 in)	73 kg (161 lb)	312 cm (123 in)	308 cm (121 in)	(Russia) Dynamo Moscow
9	Alla Galkina	15 April 1992 (aged 27)	1.78 m (5 ft 10 in)	60 kg (130 lb)	292 cm (115 in)	285 cm (112 in)	(Russia) Lokomotiv Kaliningrad
11	Margarita Kurilo	21 June 1993 (aged 26)	1.86 m (6 ft 1 in)	75 kg (165 lb)	300 cm (120 in)	290 cm (110 in)	(Russia) Yenisey Krasnoyarsk
13	Yevgeniya Startseva	12 February 1989 (aged 30)	1.85 m (6 ft 1 in)	65 kg (143 lb)	295 cm (116 in)	290 cm (110 in)	(Russia) Dynamo Kazan
14	Irina Fetisova	7 September 1994 (aged 24)	1.90 m (6 ft 3 in)	76 kg (168 lb)	304 cm (120 in)	300 cm (120 in)	(Russia) Dynamo Moscow
16	Irina Voronkova	20 October 1995 (aged 23)	1.94 m (6 ft 4 in)	86 kg (190 lb)	310 cm (120 in)	300 cm (120 in)	(Russia) Lokomotiv Kaliningrad
18	Ksenia Parubets	31 October 1994 (aged 24)	1.83 m (6 ft 0 in)	67 kg (148 lb)	300 cm (120 in)	286 cm (113 in)	(Russia) Uralochka-NTMK
19	Maria Khaletskayia	31 July 1994 (aged 25)	1.95 m (6 ft 5 in)	78 kg (172 lb)	315 cm (124 in)	305 cm (120 in)	(Russia) Dinamo Krasnodar
26	Anna Lazareva	31 January 1997 (aged 22)	1.90 m (6 ft 3 in)	70 kg (150 lb)	307 cm (121 in)	303 cm (119 in)	(Russia) Dynamo Moscow

=== Spain ===
The following is the Spanish roster in the 2019 European Championship.

- Head coach: Pascual Saurin

No.	Name	Date of birth	Height	Weight	Spike	Block	2019 club
1	Aina Berbel	14 June 1999 (aged 20)	1.87 m (6 ft 2 in)	70 kg (150 lb)	297 cm (117 in)	280 cm (110 in)	(Spain) SV Sant Cugat
2	Maria José Corral	1 January 1991 (aged 28)	1.77 m (5 ft 10 in)	68 kg (150 lb)	275 cm (108 in)	265 cm (104 in)	(Portugal) AJM/FC Porto
4	Jessica Rivero	15 March 1995 (aged 24)	1.80 m (5 ft 11 in)	82 kg (181 lb)	295 cm (116 in)	285 cm (112 in)	(Italy) Banca Valsabbina Millenium Brescia
5	Alba María Sánchez	9 September 1991 (aged 27)	1.78 m (5 ft 10 in)	66 kg (146 lb)	280 m (11,000 in)	270 cm (110 in)	(Spain) May Deco Logroño
6	Alicia de Blas	7 May 1995 (aged 24)	1.81 m (5 ft 11 in)	66 kg (146 lb)	275 cm (108 in)	260 cm (100 in)	—
7	Sofía Elízaga	5 October 1995 (aged 23)	1.80 m (5 ft 11 in)	65 kg (143 lb)	298 cm (117 in)	265 cm (104 in)	(Spain) Feel Volley Alcobendas
10	Lucrecia Castellano	18 June 2000 (aged 19)	1.83 m (6 ft 0 in)	73 kg (161 lb)	305 cm (120 in)	290 cm (110 in)	(Spain) CV CCO 7 Palmas Gran Canaria
11	Mabel Caro	13 March 1991 (aged 28)	1.84 m (6 ft 0 in)	75 kg (165 lb)	295 cm (116 in)	285 cm (112 in)	(Spain) CV Barcelona
13	Helia González	29 August 1985 (aged 33)	1.79 m (5 ft 10 in)	77 kg (170 lb)	285 cm (112 in)	275 cm (108 in)	(Spain) May Deco Logroño
14	Ariadna Priante	20 April 2002 (aged 17)	1.80 m (5 ft 11 in)	61 kg (134 lb)	295 cm (116 in)	276 cm (109 in)	(Spain) CAEP Soria
16	María Segura	10 June 1992 (aged 27)	1.83 m (6 ft 0 in)	71 kg (157 lb)	288 cm (113 in)	270 cm (110 in)	(Germany) Dresdner SC
17	Ana Escamilla	10 July 1998 (aged 21)	1.83 m (6 ft 0 in)	71 kg (157 lb)	302 cm (119 in)	285 cm (112 in)	(Spain) CV Barcelona
18	Patricia Llabrés	15 April 1996 (aged 23)	1.68 m (5 ft 6 in)	64 kg (141 lb)	254 cm (100 in)	243 cm (96 in)	(Spain) May Deco Logroño
20	Raquel Montoro	25 November 2002 (aged 16)	1.83 m (6 ft 0 in)	66 kg (146 lb)	295 cm (116 in)	280 cm (110 in)	(Spain) CAEP Soria

=== Belarus ===
The following is the Belarusian roster in the 2019 European Championship.

- Head coach: Piotr Khilko

No.	Name	Date of birth	Height	Weight	Spike	Block	2019 club
1	Vera Kastsiuchyk	27 September 2000 (aged 18)	1.91 m (6 ft 3 in)	71 kg (157 lb)	300 cm (120 in)	270 cm (110 in)	(Russia) Proton Saratov
3	Nadzeya Stoliar	1 January 1996 (aged 23)	1.83 m (6 ft 0 in)	75 kg (165 lb)	295 cm (116 in)	290 cm (110 in)	(Belarus) Minchanka Minsk
4	Hanna Kalinouskaya	17 May 1985 (aged 34)	1.90 m (6 ft 3 in)	75 kg (165 lb)	310 cm (120 in)	305 cm (120 in)	(Belarus) Minchanka Minsk
5	Vera Klimovich	29 April 1988 (aged 31)	1.85 m (6 ft 1 in)	76 kg (168 lb)	300 m (12,000 in)	295 cm (116 in)	(Israel) Maccabi XT Haifa
6	Anastasiya Harelik	20 March 1991 (aged 28)	1.85 m (6 ft 1 in)	74 kg (163 lb)	300 cm (120 in)	295 cm (116 in)	(Russia) VC Uralochka-NTMK
7	Alena Fedarynchyk	3 July 1993 (aged 26)	1.78 m (5 ft 10 in)	65 kg (143 lb)	290 cm (110 in)	285 cm (112 in)	(Belarus) Minchanka Minsk
8	Katsiaryna Sakolchyk	27 July 1993 (aged 26)	1.83 m (6 ft 0 in)	77 kg (170 lb)	295 cm (116 in)	290 cm (110 in)	(Belarus) Minchanka Minsk
9	Alina Ilyuta	4 May 1991 (aged 28)	1.84 m (6 ft 0 in)	70 kg (150 lb)	300 cm (120 in)	295 cm (116 in)	(Belarus) Pribuzhie Brest
10	Volha Pauliukouskaya	13 July 1988 (aged 31)	1.74 m (5 ft 9 in)	63 kg (139 lb)	269 cm (106 in)	250 cm (98 in)	(Poland) KSZO Ostrowiec Świętokrzyski
11	Hanna Klimets	4 March 1998 (aged 21)	1.86 m (6 ft 1 in)	75 kg (165 lb)	310 cm (120 in)	300 cm (120 in)	(Russia) VC Uralochka-NTMK
14	Anastasiya Kananovich	1 May 1993 (aged 26)	1.78 m (5 ft 10 in)	78 kg (172 lb)	285 cm (112 in)	280 cm (110 in)	(Russia) YuZGU-Atom Kursk
15	Tatsiana Markevich	25 March 1988 (aged 31)	1.83 m (6 ft 0 in)	64 kg (141 lb)	295 cm (116 in)	290 cm (110 in)	(Romania) CSM București
17	Anastasiya Shash	6 June 1996 (aged 23)	1.90 m (6 ft 3 in)	73 kg (161 lb)	298 cm (117 in)	286 cm (113 in)	(Poland) KSZO Ostrowiec Świętokrzyski
18	Yuliya Miniuk	23 May 2000 (aged 19)	1.89 m (6 ft 2 in)	83 kg (183 lb)	290 cm (110 in)	275 cm (108 in)	(Italy) Banca Valsabbina Millenium Brescia

== See also ==
- 2019 Men's European Volleyball Championship squads
