= Anika Schwörer =

Swiss volleyball player (born 2001)

Personal information
- Nationality: Swiss
- Born: 1 June 2001 (age 25)
- Hometown: Möhlin
- Height: 1.80 m (5 ft 11 in)
- Weight: 78 kg (172 lb)
- Spike: 298 cm (117 in)
- Block: 285 cm (112 in)

Volleyball information
- Position: Opposite spiker
- Current club: (Switzerland) Sm’Aesch Pfeffingen
- Number: 13
Honours
Women's volleyball
Representing Switzerland

Anika Schwörer (born 1 June 2001) is a Swiss volleyball player. She is a member of the Women's National Team. She participated at the 2018 Montreux Volley Masters. She plays for Sm’Aesch Pfeffingen.

== Clubs ==
- (Switzerland) Volley Smash 05 (2018)
- (Switzerland) Sm’Aesch Pfeffingen (2019)
