= Zaugg =

Zaugg is a surname. Notable people with the surname include:

- Adrian Zaugg (born 1986), South African racing driver
- Ernst Zaugg (1934–2016), Swiss sprinter
- Hans-Peter Zaugg (born 1952), Swiss football manager and former player
- Livia Zaugg (born 1996), Swiss volleyball player
- Oliver Zaugg (born 1981), Swiss cyclist
- Rémy Zaugg (1943–2005), Swiss painter
- Rosa Zaugg (born 1956), Swiss para table tennis player
- Wolfgang Zaugg (born 1953), Swedish-German murderer

== See also ==
- Jinelle Zaugg-Siergiej (born 1986), American ice hockey player
