= Goran Perkovac =

Croatian handball player (born 1962)

Personal information
- Full name: Goran Perkovac
- Nationality: Croatian
- Born: 16 September 1962 (age 64) Slatina, PR Croatia, FPR Yugoslavia

Sport
- Sport: Handball
- Position: Left back

Youth career
- Years: Team
- –: RK Slatina

Senior clubs
- Years: Team
- 1979–1989: RK Medveščak
- 1989–1996: BSV BORBA Luzern
- 1996–2001: TV Suhr
- 2001–2003: Pfadi Winterthur
National team
Years	Team		
1988–1990	Yugoslavia		
1992–2000	Croatia	192	(300)

Teams managed
- 2000–2001: TV Suhr
- 2001–2003: Pfadi Winterthur
- 2003–2007: Kadetten Schaffhausen
- 2007–2008: Greece
- 2008–2013: Switzerland
- 2013–2015: GWD Minden
- 2015–2016: TuS Nettelstedt-Lübbecke
- 2018–2022: HC Kriens-Luzern
- 2023–2024: Croatia
Medal record
Men's handball
Representing Yugoslavia
Olympic Games
Bronze medal – third place	1988 Seoul	Team
Representing Croatia
Olympic Games
Gold medal – first place	1996 Atlanta	Team
World Championship
Silver medal – second place	1995 Iceland	Team
European Championship
Bronze medal – third place	1994 Portugal	Team
Mediterranean Games
Gold medal – first place	1993 Languedoc-Roussillon	Team
Gold medal – first place	1997 Bari	Team

Goran Perkovac (born 16 September 1962) is a Croatian handball coach and former player who is the most recently head coach of the Croatia national team.

Perkovac competed in the 1988 Summer Olympics and in the 1996 Summer Olympics for Yugoslavia and Croatia respectively.

Perkovac's daughter Korina is a volleyball player who has played for the Switzerland women's national volleyball team.

== Playing career ==
In 1988, he was part of the Yugoslavia national team which won the bronze medal at the Olympics. He played five matches and scored four goals.

Eight years later he won the gold medal with the Croatia national team. He played all seven matches and scored 17 goals.

== Managerial career ==
From 2008 until 2013, he managed the Switzerland national team. On 9 July 2013, he signed a two-year contract with GWD Minden.

On 1 February 2023, Perkovac was named the new head coach of the Croatia men's national handball team, following the unsuccessful World Championship tournament and dismissal of Hrvoje Horvat.

== Honours ==
Player
RK Medveščak

- Yugoslav Cup (4): 1981, 1986, 1987, 1989

Borba

- Swiss First League (1): 1992–93

TV Suhr

- Swiss First League (2): 1998–99, 1999–00
- Swiss Super Cup (1): 1999

Player/Coach
Pfadi Winterthur

- Swiss First League (2): 2001–02, 2002–03
- Swiss Cup (1): 2003

Coach

- Swiss First League (3): 2004–05, 2005–06, 2006–07
- Swiss Cup (3): 2004, 2005, 2007

Individual

- Franjo Bučar State Award for Sport: 1996

Sporting positions
Preceded by Alvaro Načinović; 2	Captain of Croatia; 1996–1998	Succeeded by Patrik Ćavar; 4
