= Romana Hudecová =

Slovak volleyball player (born 1993)

Personal information
- Nationality: Slovakia
- Born: 21 September 1993 (age 33) Slovakia
- Height: 1.78 m (5 ft 10 in)
- Weight: 63 kg (139 lb)
- Spike: 310 cm (122 in)
- Block: 294 cm (116 in)

Volleyball information
- Position: Outside hitter

Career
- Years: Team
- 2012–2013 2013–2016 2016–2019 2019–2020 2020 2020–2021: (Slovakia) COP Nitra (Slovakia) Slávia Bratislava (Slovakia) Strabag Bratislava (Turkey) Astor Voleybol (Albania) Partizani Tirana (Greece) Panathinaikos

National team
- Years: Team
- 2010 2013-: Slovakia U18; Slovakia
- Updated on 22 August 2020

Romana Hudecová (born 21 September 1993) is a Slovak professional volleyball player, who has been a member of the country's U18 and senior national teams.

== Sporting achievements ==
=== National championships ===
- 2014–15 Slovak League, with Slávia Bratislava
- 2015–16 Slovak League, with Slávia Bratislava
- 2017–18 Slovak League, with Strabag Bratislava

=== National cups ===
- 2014–15 Slovak Cup, with Slávia Bratislava
- 2015–16 Slovak Cup, with Slávia Bratislava

=== Individuals ===
- 2018 Slovak Cup: Best Spiker
