= Julia Twardowska =

Polish volleyball player (born 1995)

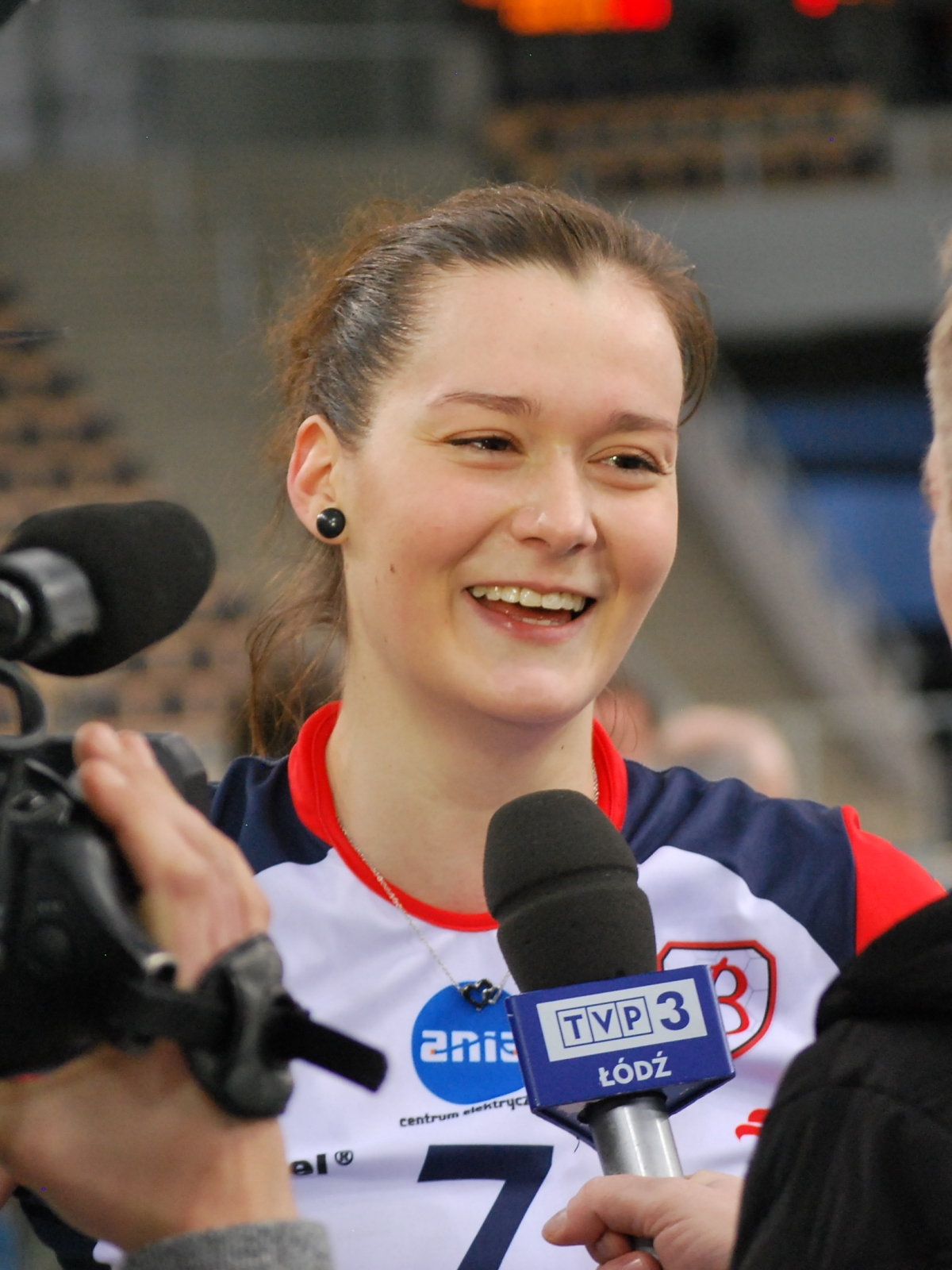

Personal information
- Nationality: Polish
- Born: 4 May 1995 (age 31); Sroda Wlkp.
- Height: 185 cm (73 in)
- Weight: 66 kg (146 lb)
- Spike: 297 cm (117 in)
- Block: 283 cm (111 in)

Volleyball information
- Position: Wing spiker
- Current club: Joker Świecie currentnumber=23 (national team)

Career
Years	Teams
2015	Budowlani Łódź

National team
2008-	Poland

Julia Twardowska (born 4 May 1995 in Środa Wielkopolska) is a Polish volleyball player. She is part of the Poland women's national volleyball team.

She participated in the 2018 Montreux Volley Masters, and 2018 FIVB Volleyball Women's Nations League. At the club level she played for Budowlani Łódź in 2018.
