= Korina Perkovac =

Swiss volleyball player (born 1999)

Personal information
- Nationality: Swiss
- Born: 7 July 1999 (age 27); Kilchberg, Switzerland
- Height: 1.84 m (6 ft 1/2 in)
- Weight: 64 kg (141 lb)
- Spike: 293 cm (115 in)
- Block: 250 cm (98 in)

Volleyball information
- Position: Wing spiker
- Current club: (Switzerland) Volley Nachwuchs Luzern
- Number: 3
Honours
Women's volleyball
Representing Switzerland

Korina Perkovac (born 7 July 1999) is a Swiss volleyball player. She is a member of the women's national team. She participated at the 2018 Montreux Volley Masters. She plays for Volley Nachwuchs Luzern. She is the daughter of Goran Perkovac.
