= Livia Zaugg =

Swiss volleyball player (born 1996)

Personal information
- Nationality: Swiss
- Born: 29 January 1996 (age 30); Kilchberg, Zürich, Switzerland
- Height: 1.80 m (5 ft 11 in)
- Weight: 65 kg (143 lb)
- Spike: 295 cm (116 in)
- Block: 285 cm (112 in)

Volleyball information
- Position: Wing spiker
- Current club: (Switzerland) Sm'Aesch Pfeffingen
- Number: 3
Honours
Women's volleyball
Representing Switzerland

Livia Zaugg (born 29 January 1996) is a Swiss volleyball player. She is a member of the Women's National Team. She participated at the 2018 Montreux Volley Masters. She plays for Sm'Aesch Pfeffingen.
