= Xenia Staffelbach =

Swiss volleyball player (born 1998)

Personal information
- Nationality: Swiss
- Born: 16 March 1998 (age 28)
- Height: 1.85 m (6 ft 1 in)
- Weight: 72 kg (159 lb)
- Spike: 293 cm (115 in)
- Block: 287 cm (113 in)

Volleyball information
- Position: Middle blocker
- Current club: (Switzerland) Viteos NUC
- Number: 13
Honours
Women's volleyball
Representing Switzerland

Xenia Staffelbach (born 16 March 1998) is a Swiss volleyball player. She participated at the 2017 Montreux Volley Masters, 2018 Montreux Volley Masters. She plays for Viteos NUC .

== Clubs ==
- (Switzerland) Viteos NUC (2017-2021)
