= Slovak Women's Volleyball League =

Extraliga ženy
- Current season, competition or edition: 2019–20 Volleyball Extraliga ženy
- Sport: Volleyball
- Founded: 1992
- First season: 1992
- Administrator: SVF
- No. of teams: 8 (2019–20)
- Country: Slovakia
- Continent: Europe
- Most recent champion: VK Slávia EU Bratislava (18th title)
- Most titles: VK Slávia EU Bratislava (18 titles)
- Level on pyramid: 1
- Relegation to: 2nd League
- Domestic cups: Slovak Cup; Slovak Super Cup
- International cups: CEV Champions League; CEV Cup; CEV Challenge Cup
- Website: http://www.svf.sk/

The Slovak Women's Volleyball League is a women's volleyball competition organized by the Slovak Volleyball Federation (Slovenská volejbalová federácia, SVF). It was created in 1992, just after the dissolution of Czechoslovakia.

== History ==
The league was created just after the dissolution of Czechoslovakia, Many teams have participated in the league since, most of them especially from the city of Bratislava, which has two strong teams which dominated the league, Slavia Bratislava first with a total of 18 titles, then in second spot BVK Bratislava with five titles.

After the final rankings two teams will represent the country in the European volleyball competitions.

== List of champions ==
Years	(gold) Gold	(silver) Silver	(bronze) Bronze
1993	Slávia UK Bratislava	Milanotrade Banská Bystrica	Slovakoturist Bratislava
1994	Slávia UK Bratislava	SPASA Žilina	
1995	Slávia UK Bratislava	SPASA Žilina	VK Spartak Trnava
1996	SPASA Žilina	UK Artmedia Bratislava	VTC Pezinok
1997	SPASA Žilina	UK Artmedia Bratislava	VTC Pezinok
1998	Slávia UK AJ OZAP Bratislava	OMS SH Senica	VK Slavia ŽU Žilina
1999	Slávia UK AJ OZAP Bratislava	VK Slavia ŽU Žilina	OMS SH Senica
2000	Slávia UK AJ OZAP Bratislava	OMS SH Senica	VK Doprastav Bratislava
2001	Slávia UK AJ OZAP Bratislava	OMS SH Senica	VK MŠK Žiar nad Hronom
2002	Slávia UK Bratislava	OMS SH Senica	Slavia Bratislava II
2003	Slávia UK Bratislava	OMS SH Senica	Slavia Bratislava II
2004	Slávia UK Bratislava	ŠK ŽU Žilina	VK MŠK Žiar nad Hronom
2005	OMS SH Senica	Slávia UK SS Bratislava	VK Doprastav Bratislava
2006	OMS Senica	Slávia UK SS Bratislava	VK MŠK Žiar nad Hronom
2007	OMS Senica	Slávia UK Bratislava	VTC Pezinok
2008	Slávia UK Kúpele Dudince Bratislava	UKF Nitra	VK Doprastav Bratislava
2009	VK Doprastav Bratislava	Slávia UK Kúpele Bratislava	VK Senica
2010	Slávia UK Bratislava	VK Senica	VK Doprastav Bratislava
2011	Slávia EU Bratislava	VK Doprastav Bratislava	VTC Pezinok
2012	VK Doprastav Bratislava	Slávia EU Bratislava	VISTA real Pezinok
2013	Slávia EU Bratislava	VK Doprastav Bratislava	VŠK Paneurópa Bratislava
2014	VK Doprastav Bratislava	Slávia EU Bratislava	VISTA real Pezinok
2015	Slávia EU Bratislava	VK Spišská Nová Ves	VTC Pezinok
2016	Slávia EU Bratislava	KV MŠK Oktan Kežmarok	BVK Bratislava
2017	Slávia EU Bratislava	BVK Bratislava	VK Eperia Prešov
2018	Strabag VC FTVŠ UK Bratislava	VK Slávia EU Bratislava	Volley project UKF Nitra
2019	VK Slávia EU Bratislava	Strabag VC FTVŠ UK Bratislava	VTC Pezinok
2020	League was stopped		

=== Table by club ===
rk.	Club	Titles	City	Years won
1	VK Slávia EU Bratislava	18	Bratislava	(1993—1995), (1998—2004), 2008, (2010—2011), 2013, (2015—2017), 2019
2	VK Doprastav Bratislava	4	Bratislava	2009, 2012, 2014, 2018
3	VK Senica	3	Senica	(2005—2007)
4	AC Uniza Žilina	2	Žilina	(1996—1997)
