= Klaudia Alagierska =

Polish volleyball player (born 1996)

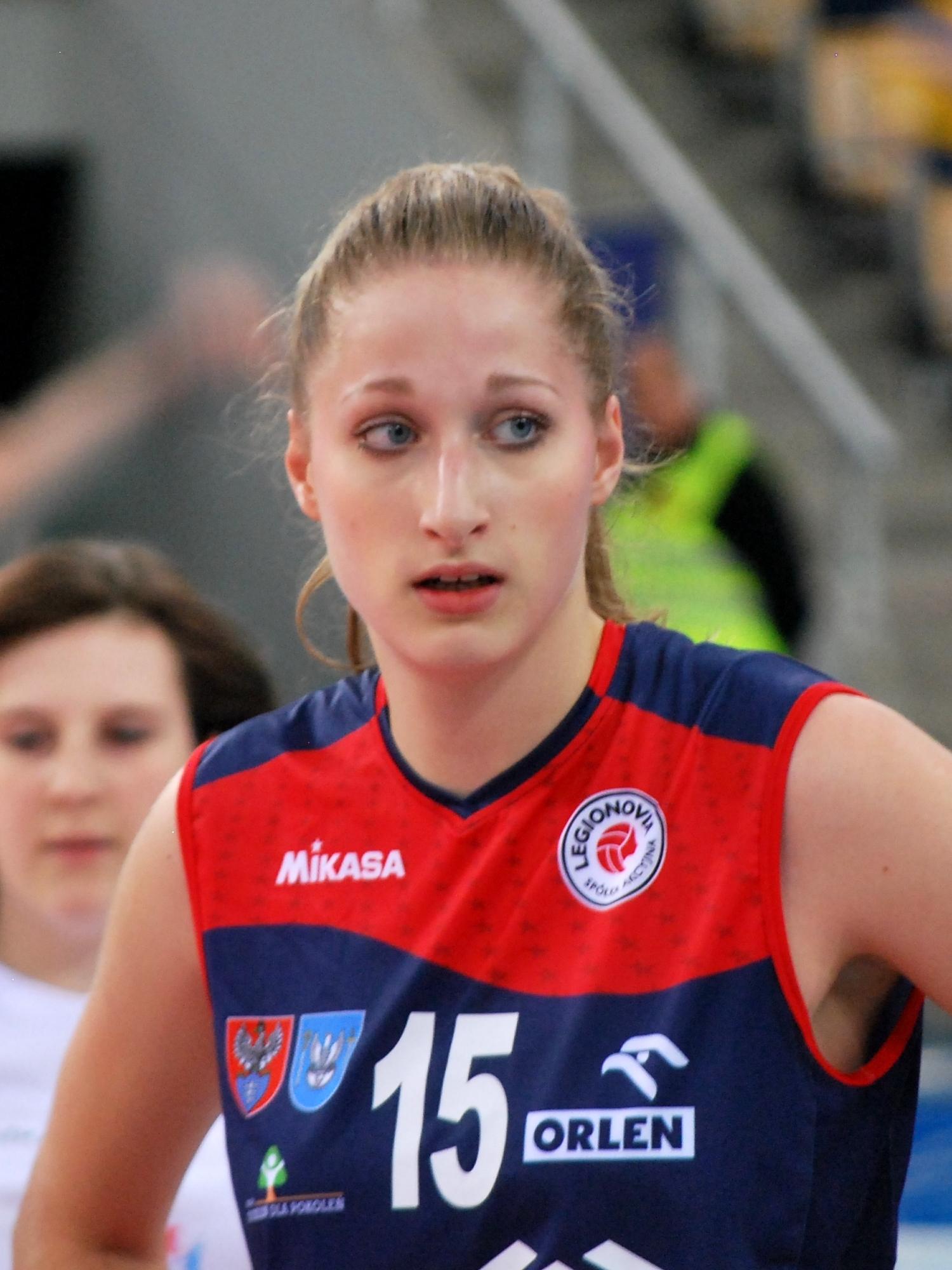
- Alagierska in 2014

Personal information
- Nationality: Polish
- Born: 2 January 1996 (age 30); Milanówek, Poland
- Height: 190 cm (6 ft 3 in)
- Weight: 76 kg (168 lb)
- Spike: 297 cm (117 in)
- Block: 290 cm (114 in)

Volleyball information
- Position: Middle blocker
- Number: 3 (national team)

Career
Years	Teams
2018-	ŁKS Commercecon Łódź

National team
2015-	Poland

Klaudia Alagierska (born 2 January 1996) is a Polish volleyball player. She is part of the Poland women's national volleyball team.

She participated in the 2017 FIVB Volleyball World Grand Prix, 2018 Montreux Volley Masters, and 2018 FIVB Volleyball Women's Nations League. On club level she played for ŁKS Commercecon Łódź.
