= Yvon Beliën =

Dutch volleyball player (born 1993)

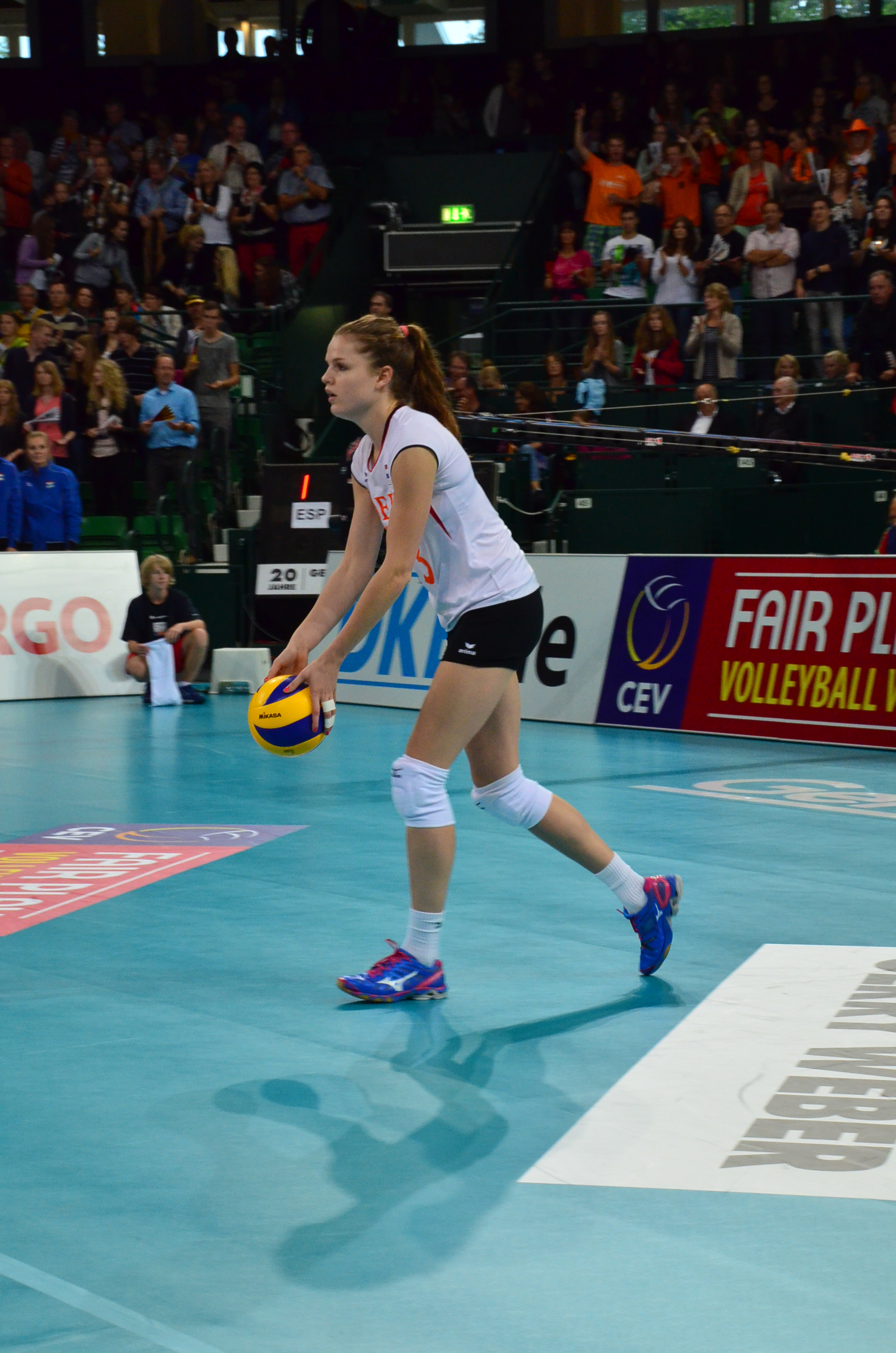

Personal information
- Nationality: Dutch
- Born: 28 December 1993 (age 32) Budel, Netherlands
- Height: 1.90 m (6 ft 3 in)
- Weight: 73 kg (161 lb)
- Spike: 307 cm (121 in)
- Block: 303 cm (119 in)

Volleyball information
- Position: Middle blocker
- Current club: Bursa BB
- Number: 9

Career
- Years: Team
- 2008–2009 2009–2010 2011–2013 2013–2014 2014–2015 2015–2017 2017–2018 2018–2019 2019-2020 2020-2021: Ledûb Volleybal; VV Peelpush; VC Weert; Ladies in Black Aachen; Schweriner SC; River Volley Piacenza; Bursa BB; Beşiktaş; Galatasaray; Firenze

National team
- Years: Team
- Netherlands
Honours
Women's volleyball
Representing the Netherlands
World Grand Prix
Bronze medal – third place	2016 Bangkok
European Championship
Silver medal – second place	2015 Belgium/Netherlands
Silver medal – second place	2017 Azerbaijan/Georgia

Yvon Beliën (born 28 December 1993) was a Dutch volleyball player, who plays as a Center. She played for River Volley Piacenza. In 2015, she played with the Dutch National Team at the 2015 European Games in Baku, Azerbaijan. In 2016, she helped the Netherlands reach their first Olympic semifinals at the 2016 Summer Olympics, finishing fourth.

In 2023, Beliën decided to retire her volleyball career.

== Personal ==
Beliën has a sister Rian, who is 2.5 years older.

== Awards ==
=== Individuals ===
- 2015 Montreux Volley Masters "Best Middle Blockers"
