= Méline Pierret =

Swiss volleyball player (born 1999)

Personal information
- Nationality: Swiss
- Born: 18 January 1999 (age 27); Fribourg
- Hometown: Fribourg
- Height: 1.75 m (5 ft 9 in)
- Weight: 61 kg (134 lb)
- Spike: 287 cm (113 in)
- Block: 275 cm (108 in)

Volleyball information
- Position: Setter
- Number: 7

Career
Years	Teams
2017, 2021–2022; 2022–	TS Volley Düdingen Power Cats; Sm’Aesch Pfeffingen
Honours
Women's volleyball
Representing Switzerland

Méline Pierret (born 18 January 1999) is a Swiss volleyball player. She is a member of the Women's National Team. She participated at the 2018 Montreux Volley Masters.

She plays for Sm’Aesch Pfeffingen.

In the past, she played for TS Volley Düdingen Power Cats.
