= Beatrice Parrocchiale =

Italian volleyball player (born 1995)

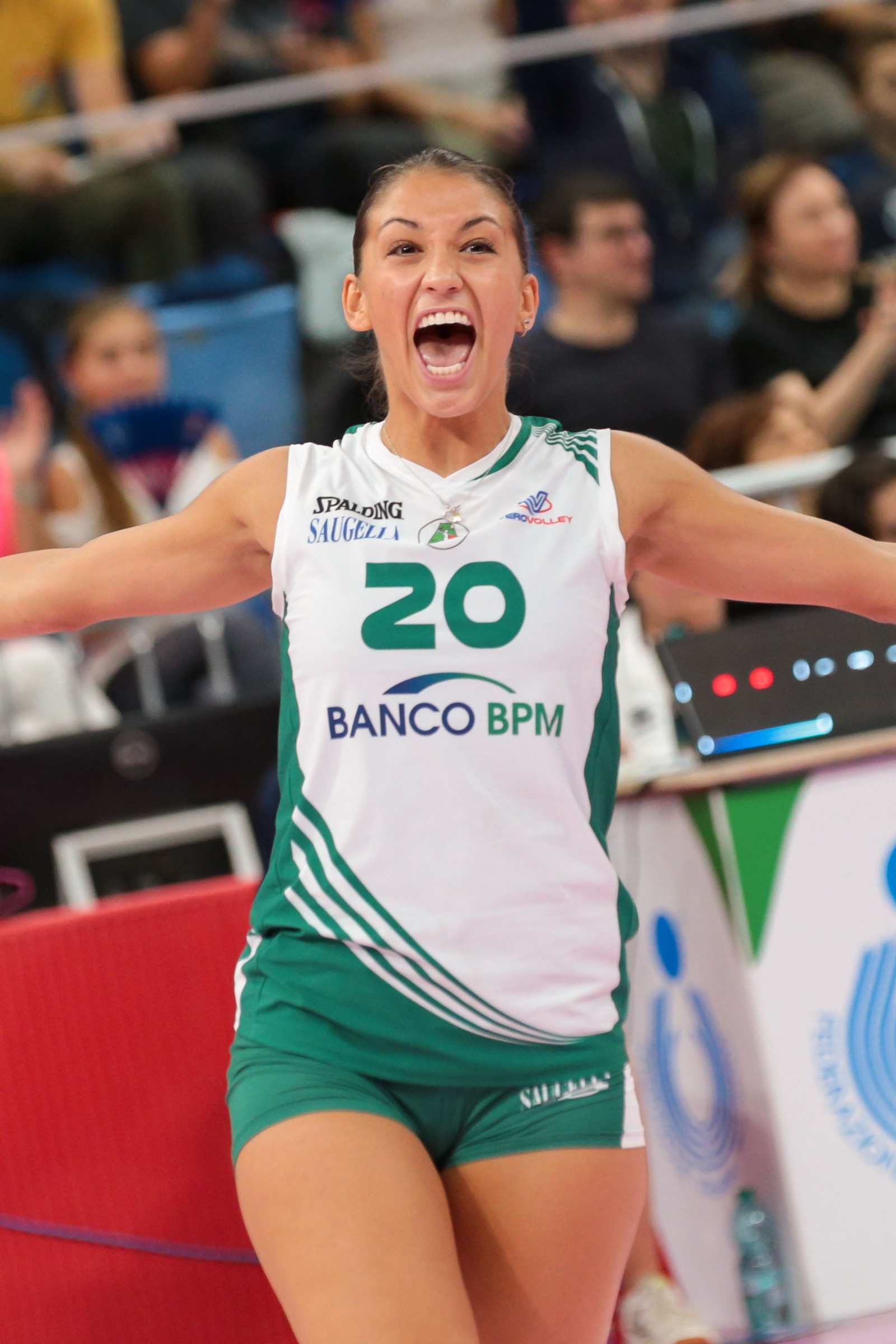
- Parrocchiale with Pro Victoria Monza in 2019

Personal information
- Nationality: Italian
- Born: 26 December 1995 (age 30); Milan, Italy
- Height: 1.67 m (5 ft 6 in)
- Weight: 60 kg (132 lb)
- Spike: 296 cm (117 in)
- Block: 213 cm (84 in)

Volleyball information
- Position: Libero
- Current club: Savino Del Bene
- Number: 10

Career
Years	Teams
2012–2013	Villa Cortese
2013–2019	San Casciano
2019–2023	Pro Victoria Monza
2023–	Savino Del Bene

National team
2015–	Italy
Honours
Women's volleyball
Representing Italy
World Championship
Silver medal – second place	2018 Japan	Team
FIVB Nations League
Gold medal – first place	2024 Bangkok	Team
European Championship
Gold medal – first place	2021 Serbia/Bulgaria/Croatia/Romania	Team
Bronze medal – third place	2019 Turkey	Team
FIVB World Grand Prix
Silver medal – second place	2017 Nanjing
Montreux Volley Masters
Bronze medal – third place	2019 Montreux	Team

Beatrice Parrocchiale (born 26 December 1995) is an Italian volleyball player, playing as a libero. She is part of the Italy women's national volleyball team.

== Career ==
Parrocchiale won the A2 Italian Cup with San Casciano.

She competed at the 2015 European Games in Baku. She participated in the 2015 FIVB Volleyball World Grand Prix, and 2019 Montreux Volley Masters.

She won the 2017 FIVB World Grand Prix silver medal and later played the 2017 European Championship with her national team, reaching the fifth place.

On club level she played for Atletica Amatori Orago in 2015.

She was selected to play the Italian League All-Star game in 2017.

== Awards ==
=== Clubs ===
- 2014 Italian Cup A2 – Champion, with San Casciano
