= Sm'Aesch Pfeffingen =

Swiss women's volleyball team

- Nickname: Ladys in Pink
- Founded: 7 January 2000
- Ground: Mehrzweckhalle Löhrenacker
- Manager: Timo Lippuner
- League: Swiss Women's Volleyball League
- Website: smaeschpfeffingen.ch

Uniforms
Home	Away

Sm'Aesch Pfeffingen is a Swiss women's professional volleyball team based in Pfeffingen, Basel-Landschaft.

The team plays in the Swiss Women's Volleyball League.

== Titles ==
- Swiss Supercup
  - 2020

== Notable players ==
To appear in this section a player must have either:

– Set a club record or won an individual award as a professional player.
– Played at least one official international match for his senior national team at any time.

- (Switzerland) Méline Pierret
- (Croatia) Luna Bečić
