= 2018 Montreux Volley Masters =

Women's volleyball tournament

Tournament details
- Host country: Switzerland
- Dates: 4–9 September
- Teams: 8
- Venue: 1 (in 1 host city)

Final positions
- Champions: Italy (2nd title)

Tournament awards
- MVP: Paola Egonu (ITA)

The 2018 Montreux Volley Masters is the 33rd edition of the women's volleyball competition set in Montreux, Switzerland.

== Participating teams ==
Pool A	Pool B
China; Italy; Switzerland; Turkey	Brazil; Cameroon; Poland; Russia

== Group stage ==
The first 2 teams of each group qualify for the final round.

- All times are Central European Summer Time (UTC+02:00).

=== Group A ===
Pos	Team	Pld	W	L	Pts	SW	SL	SR	SPW	SPL	SPR	Qualification
1	Turkey	3	3	0	9	9	1	9.000	249	206	1.209	Semifinals
2	Italy	3	2	1	6	6	3	2.000	213	177	1.203	Semifinals
3	China	3	1	2	3	4	6	0.667	206	218	0.945	
4	Switzerland	3	0	3	0	0	9	0.000	158	225	0.702	

Date	Time		Score		Set 1	Set 2	Set 3	Set 4	Set 5	Total	Report
4 Sep	16:30	China	3–0	Switzerland	25–21	25–14	25–10			75–45	P2
4 Sep	21:15	Italy	0–3	Turkey	18–25	24–26	21–25			63–76	P2
5 Sep	18:45	China	0–3	Italy	20–25	13–25	13–25			46–75	P2
6 Sep	16:30	Italy	3–0	Switzerland	25–15	25–18	25–22			75–55	P2
6 Sep	18:45	China	1–3	Turkey	19–25	18–25	25–23	23–25		85–98	P2
7 Sep	16:30	Switzerland	0–3	Turkey	21–25	15–25	22–25			58–75	P2

=== Group B ===
Pos	Team	Pld	W	L	Pts	SW	SL	SR	SPW	SPL	SPR	Qualification
1	Brazil	3	2	1	7	8	4	2.000	278	238	1.168	Semifinals
2	Russia	3	2	1	6	7	3	2.333	243	203	1.197	Semifinals
3	Poland	3	2	1	5	6	5	1.200	242	244	0.992	
4	Cameroon	3	0	3	0	0	9	0.000	147	225	0.653	

Date	Time		Score		Set 1	Set 2	Set 3	Set 4	Set 5	Total	Report
4 Sep	18:45	Brazil	3–1	Russia	24–26	25–21	25–21	25–23		99–91	P2
5 Sep	16:30	Cameroon	0–3	Russia	15–25	17–25	13–25			45–75	P2
5 Sep	21:15	Brazil	2–3	Poland	20–25	25–21	25–22	22–25	12–15	104–108	P2
6 Sep	21:15	Cameroon	0–3	Poland	19–25	22–25	22–25			63–75	P2
7 Sep	18:45	Russia	3–0	Poland	25–16	27–25	25–18			77–59	P2
7 Sep	21:15	Brazil	3–0	Cameroon	25–11	25–15	25–13			75–39	P2

== Classification round ==
Date	Time		Score		Set 1	Set 2	Set 3	Set 4	Set 5	Total	Report
8 Sep	13:00	China	3–1	Poland	25–23	28–26	21–25	25–23		99–97	P2
8 Sep	15:30	Cameroon	3–2	Switzerland	18–25	25–20	11–25	28–26	15–1	97–97	P2

== Final round ==
Semifinal
8 September
Brazil	2
Italy	3
8 September
Turkey	1
Russia	3

Final
9 September
Italy	3
Russia	0
Third place match
9 September
Brazil	2
Turkey	3

=== Semifinal ===
Date	Time		Score		Set 1	Set 2	Set 3	Set 4	Set 5	Total	Report
8 Sep	18:30	Brazil	2–3	Italy	25–19	18–25	25–22	17–25	12–15	97–106	P2
8 Sep	21:00	Turkey	1–3	Russia	17–25	25–20	15–25	21–25		78–95	P2

=== 3rd place ===
Date	Time		Score		Set 1	Set 2	Set 3	Set 4	Set 5	Total	Report
9 Sep	13:30	Brazil	2–3	Turkey	16–25	18–25	25–23	25–20	13–15	97–108	P2

=== Final ===
Date	Time		Score		Set 1	Set 2	Set 3	Set 4	Set 5	Total	Report
9 Sep	16:00	Italy	3–0	Russia	25–21	30–28	26–24			81–73	P2

== Final standings ==
Rank	Team
1st place, gold medalist(s)	Italy
2nd place, silver medalist(s)	Russia
3rd place, bronze medalist(s)	Turkey
4	Brazil
5	China
6	Poland
7	Cameroon
8	Switzerland

== Awards ==
- Most Valuable Player

(Italy) Paola Egonu

- Team MVPs

(Brazil) Gabriela Guimarães
(China) Lin Li
(Cameroon) Fotso Mogoung
(Italy) Lucia Bosetti
(Poland) Agnieszka Kąkolewska
(Russia) Nataliya Goncharova
(Switzerland) Thays Deprati
(Turkey) Cansu Özbay
