= Veronika Hrončeková =

Slovak volleyball player

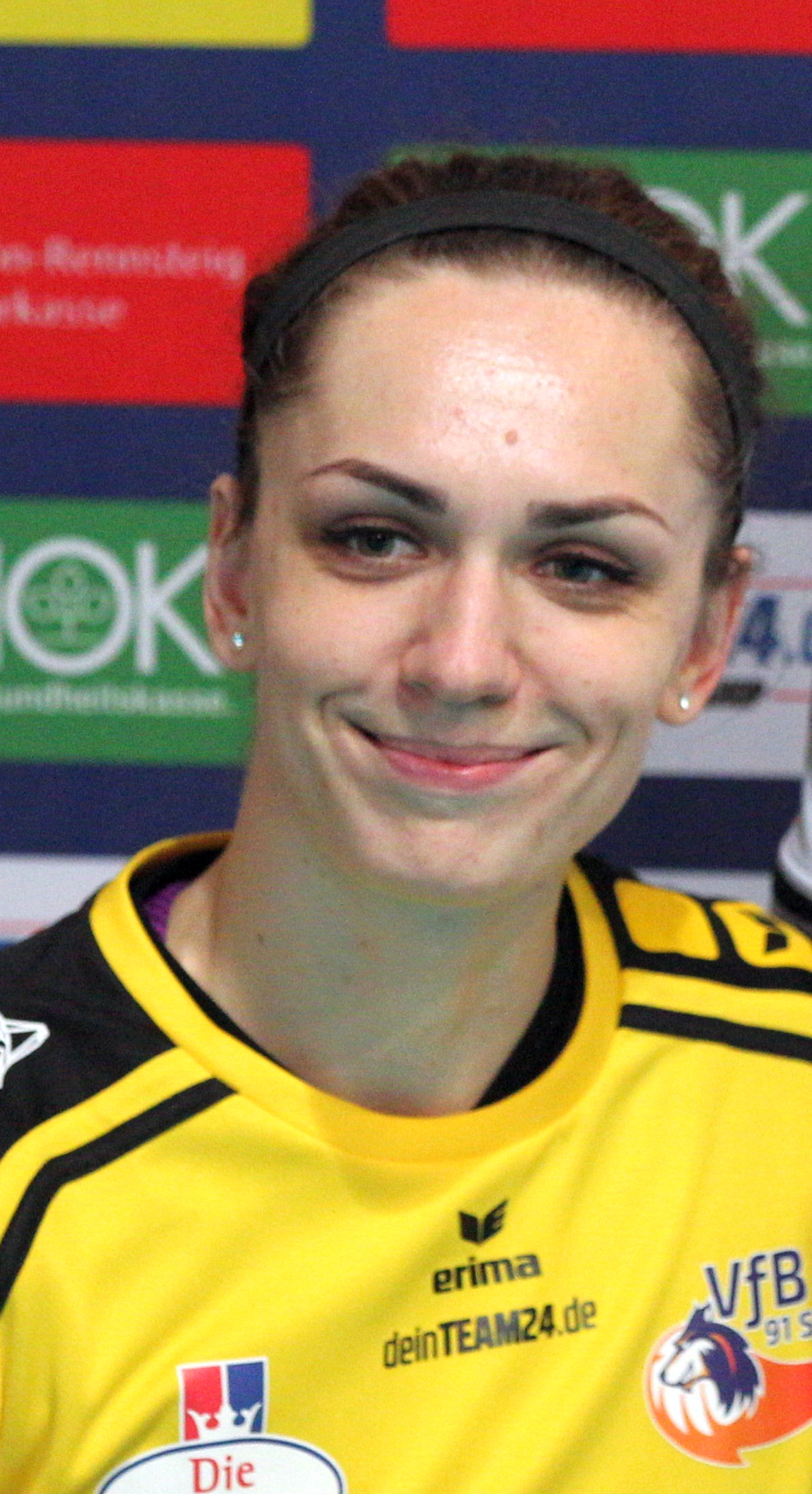

Personal information
- Nationality: Slovak
- Born: 2 January 1990 (age 36) Zvolen, Czechoslovakia
- Height: 1.92 m (6 ft 3 1/2 in)
- Weight: 71 kg (157 lb)
- Spike: 315 cm (124 in)
- Block: 295 cm (116 in)

Volleyball information
- Position: Middle-blocker
- Current club: (Israel) Hapoel Kfar Saba

Career
- Years: Team
- 2019–current: Hapoel Kfar Saba

National team
- Years: Team
- 2007–2019: Slovakia
Honours
Women's volleyball
Representing Slovakia
European League
Bronze medal – third place	2017 Finland/Ukraine

Veronika Hrončeková (born 2 January 1990) is a Slovak female volleyball player. She is part of the Slovakia women's national volleyball team. She competed at the 2007 Women's European Volleyball Championship, 2009 Women's European Volleyball Championship, 2019 Women's European Volleyball Championship.

== Clubs ==
- (Slovakia) Zvolen (none–2004)
- (Slovakia) Slávia UK Bratislava (2004–2010)
- (Czech Republic) VK Agel Prostejov (2010–2013)
- (Germany) Schweriner SC (2013–2016)
- (Germany) VfB 91 Suhl (2016–2017)
- (Romania) CSM Târgoviște (2017–2018)
- (Slovakia) Strabag VC FTVŠ UK Bratislava (2018–2019)
- (Israel) Hapoel Kfar Saba (2019–present)
