= 2023 Women's European Volleyball Championship squads =

This article shows all participating team squads at the 2023 Women's European Volleyball Championship, held in Belgium, Estonia, Germany and Italy from 15 August to 3 September 2023.

== Pool A ==
=== Belgium ===
The following is the Belgian roster in the 2023 European Championship.

- Head coach: Kris Vansnick
- 2 Elise Van Sas S
- 3 Britt Herbots OS
- 4 Nathalie Lemmens MB
- 7 Celine Van Gestel OS
- 9 Nel Demeyer L
- 10 Pauline Martin OP
- 12 Charlotte Krenicky S
- 13 Marlies Janssens MB
- 15 Jutta Van de Vyver S
- 18 Britt Rampelberg L
- 19 Silke Van Avermaet MB
- 21 Manon Stragier OS
- 22 Anna Koulberg MB
- 23 Noor Debouck OS

=== Hungary ===
The following is the Hungarian roster in the 2023 European Championship.

- Head coach: (Italy) Alessandro Chiappini
- 2 Adrienn Vezsenyi OP
- 3 Fruzsina Tóth L
- 5 Alíz Kump MB
- 6 Zóra Glemboczki OS
- 7 Kata Török OS
- 8 Eszter Pekárik MB
- 10 Liliána Berkó S
- 13 Anett Németh OP
- 14 Gréta Kiss OS
- 16 Panni Petőváry L
- 19 Andrea Pintér MB
- 21 Ágnes Boskó S
- 22 Petra Kertész L
- 23 Alexandra Lászlop MB

=== Poland ===
The following is the Polish roster in the 2023 European Championship.

- Head coach: (Italy) Stefano Lavarini
- 1 Maria Stenzel L
- 5 Agnieszka Kąkolewska MB
- 6 Kamila Ganszczyk MB
- 7 Monika Gałkowska OP
- 9 Magdalena Stysiak OS
- 10 Monika Fedusio OS
- 11 Martyna Łukasik OP
- 12 Aleksandra Szczygłowska L
- 14 Joanna Wołosz S
- 22 Weronika Szlagowska OS
- 26 Katarzyna Wenerska S
- 27 Joanna Pacak MB
- 30 Olivia Różański OS
- 95 Magdalena Jurczyk MB

=== Serbia ===
The following is the Serbian roster in the 2023 European Championship.

- Head coach: (Italy) Giovanni Guidetti
- 1 Bianka Buša OS
- 2 Katarina Lazović OS
- 4 Bojana Drča S
- 5 Mina Popović MB
- 9 Aleksandra Uzelac OS
- 10 Maja Ognjenović S
- 11 Hena Kurtagić MB
- 12 Teodora Pušić L
- 13 Ana Bjelica OP
- 14 Maja Aleksić MB
- 15 Jovana Stevanović MB
- 16 Aleksandra Jegdić L
- 18 Tijana Bošković OP
- 22 Sara Lozo OS

=== Slovenia ===
The following is the Slovenian roster in the 2023 European Championship.

- Head coach: (Italy) Marco Bonitta
- 1 Iza Mlakar OP
- 3 Eva Pogačar S
- 4 Maša Pucelj OS
- 5 Lorena Lorber Fijok OS
- 8 Eva Zatković OP
- 9 Mija Šiftar OS
- 10 Sara Najdič OP
- 11 Mirta Velikonja Grbac MB
- 13 Nika Milošič MB
- 14 Naja Boisa OS
- 15 Anja Mazej L
- 18 Saša Planinšec MB
- 20 Katja Banko L
- 27 Isa Ramić OP

=== Ukraine ===
The following is the Ukrainian roster in the 2023 European Championship.

- Head coach: (Bulgaria) Ivan Petkov
- 1 Oleksandra Milenko OS
- 2 Diana Meliushkyna MB
- 4 Alika Lutsenko L
- 5 Krystyna Niemtseva L
- 7 Svitlana Dorsman MB
- 9 Viktoriia Oliinyk S
- 14 Daria Sharhorodska S
- 16 Anastasiia Maievska MB
- 17 Yevheniia Khober OS
- 19 Viktoriia Danchak OP
- 23 Yuliia Dymar OS
- 24 Anastasiia Kraiduba OP
- 26 Ulyana Kotar MB
- 29 Nadiia Kodola OS

== Pool B ==
=== Bosnia and Herzegovina ===
The following is the Bosnia and Herzegovinan roster in the 2023 European Championship.

- Head coach: (Serbia) Stevan Ljubičić
- 1 Ajla Paradžik MB
- 2 Ana Zekić OS
- 3 Milana Božić S
- 4 Dora Brašnić L
- 5 Iman Isanović OS
- 7 Anđelka Radišković OS
- 9 Edina Begić OS
- 10 Maja Lasic MB
- 11 Edina Selimović MB
- 12 Milica Ivković L
- 13 Jovana Biberdžić OS
- 17 Dajana Bošković OP
- 18 Dragana Stevanović S
- 22 Nina Dukić OP

=== Bulgaria ===
The following is the Bulgarian roster in the 2022 European Championship.

- Head coach: (Italy) Lorenzo Micelli
- 1 Iveta Stanchulova S
- 2 Vangeliya Rachkovska OS
- 5 Maria Yordanova OS
- 6 Miroslava Paskova OS
- 8 Petya Barakova S
- 9 Elena Becheva OS
- 10 Mira Todorova MB
- 11 Mariya Krivoshiyska MB
- 13 Mila Pashkuleva L
- 14 Borislava Saykova MB
- 16 Mirela Shahpazova S
- 17 Radostina Marinova OS
- 23 Galina Karabasheva L
- 28 Merelin Nikolova OS

=== Croatia ===
The following is the Croatian roster in the 2023 European Championship.

- Head coach: (Turkey) Ferhat Akbaş
- 1 Karla Antunović S
- 2 Andrea Mihaljević OP
- 3 Ema Strunjak MB
- 4 Božana Butigan MB
- 6 Lea Deak S
- 9 Lucija Mlinar OS
- 10 Dijana Karatović OS
- 11 Nina Strize OP
- 12 Josipa Marković OS
- 14 Martina Šamadan MB
- 15 Viktoria Ana Trcol MB
- 17 Tia Kovčo L
- 19 Izabela Štimac L
- 22 Mirta Freund MB

=== Italy ===
The following is the Italian roster in the 2023 European Championship.

- Head coach: Davide Mazzanti
- 1 Marina Lubian MB
- 2 Alice Degradi OS
- 4 Francesca Bosio S
- 7 Eleonora Fersino L
- 8 Alessia Orro S
- 11 Anna Danesi MB
- 14 Elena Pietrini OS
- 15 Sylvia Nwakalor OP
- 17 Miriam Sylla OS
- 18 Paola Egonu OP
- 19 Federica Squarcini MB
- 20 Beatrice Parrocchiale L
- 21 Loveth Omorouyi OS
- 24 Ekaterina Antropova OP

=== Romania ===
The following is the Romanian roster in the 2023 European Championship.

- Head coach: (Spain) Guillermo Naranjo Hernandez
- 1 Diana Ariton MB
- 2 Diana-Teodora Vereș L
- 3 Rodica Buterez OS
- 5 Raisa-Laura Ioan MB
- 6 Mihaela Albu L
- 7 Elizabet Lenke MB
- 8 Ana-Marisa Radu S
- 9 Iarina-Luana Axinte S
- 11 Maria Matei OS
- 14 Roxana Roman MB
- 15 Sorina Miclaus OS
- 18 Dalia Vîrlan MB
- 19 Adelina Budai-Ungureanu OP
- 21 Iuna Zadorojnai OP

=== Switzerland ===
The following is the Swiss roster in the 2023 European Championship.

- Head coach: (Australia) Lauren Bertolacci
- 4 Alix De Micheli MB
- 5 Chiara Petitat OS
- 6 Madlaina Matter MB
- 7 Méline Pierret S
- 8 Samira Sulser MB
- 11 Maja Storck OP
- 14 Laura Künzler OS
- 15 Tabea Eichler OP
- 16 Fabiana Mottis L
- 17 Julie Lengweiler OS
- 18 Olivia Wassner S
- 19 Sindi Mico OS
- 21 Mathilde Engel L
- 22 Julia Künzler OS

== Pool C ==
=== Azerbaijan ===
The following is the Azerbaijani roster in the 2023 European Championship.

- Head coach: (Turkey) Ataman Güneyligil
- 2 Yana Doroshenko S
- 3 Yelyzaveta Ruban OS
- 5 Odina Aliyeva OS
- 6 Ayshan Abdulazimova MB
- 7 Olena Kharchenko MB
- 9 Nikalina Bashnakova OS
- 10 Anastasiia Mertsalova MB
- 11 Aynur Imanova MB
- 14 Kristina Besman S
- 16 Yuliya Karimova L
- 17 Polina Rahimova OP
- 19 Bayaz Guluyeva L
- 20 Margarita Stepanenko OP
- 22 Maria Kirilyuk MB

=== Czech Republic ===
The following is the Czech roster in the 2023 European Championship.

- Head coach: (Greece) Ioannis Athanasopoulos
- 2 Eva Hodanová OS
- 3 Elen Jedličková MB
- 4 Silvie Pavlová MB
- 7 Magdalena Bukovksa OS
- 8 Ela Koulisiani MB
- 9 Daniela Digrinová L
- 10 Kateřina Valková S
- 11 Veronika Dostálová L
- 15 Magdalena Jehlárová MB
- 16 Michaela Mlejnková OS
- 19 Katerina Pelikanova S
- 22 Gabriela Orvošová OP
- 25 Monika Brancuská MB
- 61 Helena Havelková OS

=== Germany ===
The following is the German roster in the 2023 European Championship.

- Head coach: (Belgium) Vital Heynen
- 2 Pia Kästner S
- 3 Annie Cesar L
- 4 Anna Pogany L
- 5 Corina Glaab S
- 6 Antonia Stautz OS
- 9 Lina Alsmeier OS
- 10 Lena Stigrot OS
- 12 Hanna Orthmann OS
- 14 Marie Schölzel MB
- 16 Anastasia Cekulaev MB
- 17 Laura Weihenmaier OS
- 21 Camilla Weitzel MB
- 22 Monique Strubbe MB
- 25 Rica Maase OP

=== Greece ===
The following is the Greek roster in the 2023 European Championship.

- Head coach: (Turkey) Yunus Öçal
- 1 Martha Anthouli OP
- 2 Maria-Eleni Artakianou L
- 3 Aristea Tontai MB
- 4 Anna Maria Spanou OS
- 5 Asimina Nikologianni OS
- 7 Tzina Lamprousi MB
- 8 Anna Kalantatze MB
- 9 Xeni Kakouratou L
- 11 Lamprini Konstantinidou S
- 12 Olga Strantzali OS
- 14 Kiriaki Terzoglou MB
- 15 Eleni Baka OS
- 18 Panagiota Xanthopoulou S
- 21 Maria Tsitsigianni OP

=== Sweden ===
The following is the Swedish roster in the 2023 European Championship.

- Head coach: (Finland) Jukka Lehtonen
- 1 Elsa Arrestad MB
- 3 Linda Andersson MB
- 4 Jonna Wasserfaller MB
- 9 Rebecka Lazić OS
- 10 Isabelle Haak OP
- 11 Alexandra Lazić OS
- 12 Hilda Gustafsson S
- 13 Filippa Brink L
- 14 Hanna Hellvig OS
- 16 Vilma Julevik S
- 17 Anna Haak OS
- 18 Julia Nilsson MB
- 21 Elin Larsson OP
- 25 Emmy Andersson L

=== Turkey ===
The following is the Turkish roster in the 2023 European Championship.

- Head coach: (Italy) Daniele Santarelli
- 1 Gizem Örge L
- 2 Simge Şebnem Aköz L
- 3 Cansu Özbay S
- 4 Melissa Vargas OP
- 5 Ayça Aykaç L
- 6 Kübra Akman MB
- 7 Hande Baladın OS
- 11 Derya Cebecioğlu OS
- 12 Elif Şahin S
- 14 Eda Erdem Dündar MB
- 18 Zehra Güneş MB
- 19 Aslı Kalaç MB
- 22 İlkin Aydın OS
- 99 Ebrar Karakurt OP

== Pool D ==
=== Estonia ===
The following is the Estonian roster in the 2023 European Championship.

- Head coach: (Italy) Alessandro Orefice
- 1 Eliisa Peit MB
- 4 Kristiine Miilen OS
- 5 Liis Kiviloo MB
- 7 Eliise Hollas MB
- 8 Salme Adeele Hollas OP
- 11 Kertu Laak OP
- 12 Janelle Leenurm L
- 13 Silvia Pertens OS
- 14 Meriliin Paalo L
- 16 Karolina Kibbermann S
- 17 Häli Vahula S
- 19 Kadi Kullerkann OP
- 20 Kätriin Põld MB
- 21 Kadri Kangro L

=== Finland ===
The following is the Finnish roster in the 2023 European Championship.

- Head coach: (Switzerland) Nikolas Buser
- 3 Netta Rekola MB
- 5 Suvi Kokkonen OS
- 8 Kaisa Alanko S
- 9 Ada Aronen OS
- 10 Sanna Häkkinen L
- 11 Iida Pöllänen OS
- 12 Piia Korhonen OP
- 13 Emilia Kääntä OS
- 14 Roosa Laakkonen MB
- 15 Daniela Öhman MB
- 16 Netta Laaksonen L
- 17 Saana Lindgren OP
- 19 Sofia Lehto S
- 20 Rosa Bjärregård-Madsen OP

=== France ===
The following is the French roster in the 2023 European Championship.

- Head coach: Emile Rousseaux
- 1 Héléna Cazaute OS
- 2 Nawelle Chouikh-Barbez OS
- 3 Amandine Giardino L
- 4 Christina Bauer MB
- 9 Nina Stojiljković S
- 11 Lucille Gicquel OP
- 15 Amandha Sylves MB
- 21 Eva Elouga MB
- 23 Léandra Olinga-Andela MB
- 63 Emilie Respaut S
- 75 Guewe Diouf OP
- 88 Amélie Rotar OS
- 91 Halimatou Bah OS
- 99 Juliette Gelin L

=== Netherlands ===
The following is the Dutch roster in the 2023 European Championship.

- Head coach: (Germany) Felix Koslowski
- 1 Kirsten Knip L
- 4 Celeste Plak OP
- 5 Jolien Knollema OS
- 7 Juliet Lohuis MB
- 10 Sarah van Aalen S
- 12 Britt Bongaerts S
- 14 Laura Dijkema S
- 16 Indy Baijens MB
- 18 Marrit Jasper OS
- 19 Nika Daalderop OS
- 23 Eline Timmerman MB
- 25 Florien Reesink L
- 26 Elles Dambrink OP
- 33 Nova Marring OS

=== Slovakia ===
The following is the Slovakian roster in the 2023 European Championship.

- Head coach: Michal Mašek
- 1 Michaela Abrhámová MB
- 2 Barbora Koseková S
- 6 Karin Palgutová OS
- 7 Michaela Pallová L
- 10 Nina Herelová MB
- 13 Lenka Ovečková S
- 14 Tereza Hrušecká MB
- 15 Karolína Fričová OS
- 18 Karin Šunderlíková OP
- 19 Katarína Körmendyová MB
- 20 Zuzana Šepeľová OS
- 21 Diana Návratová OP
- 22 Mária Žernovič OS
- 24 Ema Magdinová L

=== Spain ===
The following is the Spanish roster in the 2023 European Championship.

- Head coach: Pascual Saurin
- 1 Ariadna Priante S
- 2 Zoi Mavrommatis OS
- 5 Paola Martínez OP
- 7 Margalida Pizà L
- 8 Carlota García MB
- 9 Patricia Aranda S
- 11 Júlia de Paula OP
- 12 Lucia Varela MB
- 13 Patricia Llabrés L
- 15 Lucía Prol OS
- 16 María Priscilla Schlegel OS
- 18 Carla Jiménez Ruiz MB
- 22 Raquel Lázaro S
- 28 Carolina Camino OS

== See also ==
- 2023 Men's European Volleyball Championship squads
