= Sandra Szabóová =

Slovak volleyball player (born 1993)

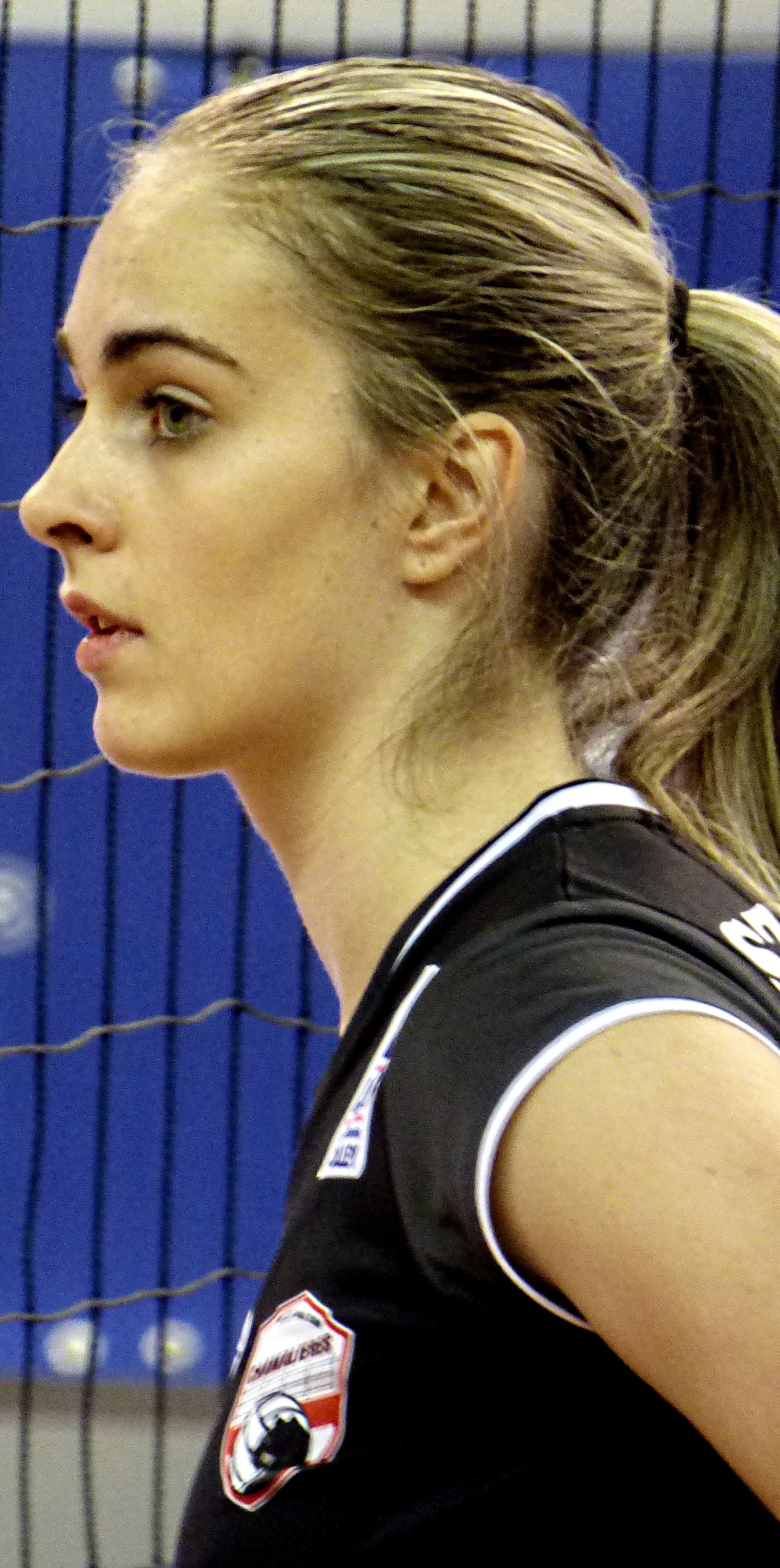

Personal information
- Nationality: Slovak
- Born: 22 July 1996 (age 30); Komárno, Slovakia
- Height: 1.90 m (6 ft 3 in)
- Weight: 71 kg (157 lb)
- Spike: 300 cm (120 in)
- Block: 288 cm (113 in)

Volleyball information
- Position: Middle blocker
- Current club: (France) Volley-Ball Club Chamaliéres

Career
Years	Teams
2019–current	Volley-Ball Club Chamaliéres

National team
2017–present	Slovakia
Honours
Women's volleyball
Representing Slovakia
European League
Silver medal – second place	2016 Slovakia/Azerbaijan
Bronze medal – third place	2017 Finland/Ukraine

Sandra Szabóová (born 22 July 1996) is a Slovak female volleyball player. She is part of the Slovakia women's national volleyball team. She competed at the 2019 Women's European Volleyball Championship.

== Clubs ==
- (Slovakia) VK Komárno (none–2013)
- (Slovakia) Slávia EU Bratislava (2013–2018)
- (Germany) SC Potsdam (2018–2019)
- (France) Volley-Ball Club Chamaliéres (2019–present)
