= Jaroslava Pencová =

Slovak volleyball player (born 1990)

Jaroslava Pencová now Adamcová

Personal information
- Nationality: Slovak
- Born: 24 June 1990 (age 36); Bratislava, Czechoslovakia
- Height: 1.91 m (6 ft 3 in)
- Weight: 81 kg (179 lb)
- Spike: 308 cm (121 in)
- Block: 295 cm (116 in)

Volleyball information
- Position: Middle-blocker
- Current club: (Poland) Grot Budowlani Lodž

Career
Years	Teams
2018–current	Grot Budowlani Lodž

National team
2009–present	Slovakia
Honours
Women's volleyball
Representing Slovakia
European League
Silver medal – second place	2016 Slovakia/Azerbaijan
Bronze medal – third place	2017 Finland/Ukraine

Jaroslava Pencová (born 24 June 1990) is a Slovak female volleyball player. She is part of the Slovakia women's national volleyball team. She competed at the 2019 Women's European Volleyball Championship.

== Clubs ==
- (Slovakia) ŠŠK Bilíkova Bratislava (none–2006)
- (Slovakia) Doprastav Bratislava (2006–2013)
- (Germany) Dresdner SC (2013–2015)
- (Azerbaijan) Lokomotiv Baku (2015–2016)
- (Poland) BKS Bielsko-Biala (2017–2017)
- (Italy) SAB Volley Legnano (2017–2018)
- (Poland) Grot Budowlani Lodž (2018–present)
