= Barbora Koseková =

Slovak volleyball player

Personal information
- Nationality: Slovak
- Born: 22 November 1994 (age 31); Bratislava, Slovakia
- Height: 1.78 m (5 ft 10 in)
- Weight: 71 kg (157 lb)
- Spike: 280 cm (110 in)
- Block: 268 cm (106 in)

Volleyball information
- Position: Setter
- Current club: (Hungary) Fatum Nyíregyháza

Career
Years	Teams
2019–current	Fatum Nyíregyháza

National team
2015–present	Slovakia
Honours
Women's volleyball
Representing Slovakia
European League
Silver medal – second place	2016 Slovakia/Azerbaijan
Bronze medal – third place	2017 Finland/Ukraine

Barbora Koseková (born 22 November 1994) is a Slovak female volleyball player. She is part of the Slovakia women's national volleyball team. She competed at the 2019 Women's European Volleyball Championship.

== Clubs ==
- (Germany) VVG Grimma (2004–2006)
- (Slovakia) ŠŠK Bilíková Bratislava (2006–2011)
- (Slovakia) VK Slávia EU Bratislava (2011–2016)
- (Czech Republic) VK KP Brno (2016–2017)
- (Hungary) Linamar Békescsaba (2017–2018)
- (Romania) UVT Agroland Timișoara (2018–2018)
- (Slovakia) VTC Pezinok-Bilíkova (2019–2019)
- (Hungary) Fatum Nyíregyháza (2019–present)
