= Michaela Španková =

Slovak volleyball player (born 1999)

Personal information
- Nationality: Slovak
- Born: 1 August 1999 (age 27); Liptovský Mikuláš, Slovakia
- Height: 1.69 m (5 ft 6 1/2 in)
- Weight: 63 kg (139 lb)
- Spike: 281 cm (111 in)
- Block: 262 cm (103 in)

Volleyball information
- Position: Libero
- Current club: (Slovakia) Strabag VC FTVŠ UK Bratislava

Career
Years	Teams
2018–current	Strabag VC FTVŠ UK Bratislava

National team
2017–present	Slovakia
Honours
Women's volleyball
Representing Slovakia
European League
Bronze medal – third place	2017 Finland/Ukraine

Michaela Španková (born 1 August 1999) is a Slovak female volleyball player. She is part of the Slovakia women's national volleyball team. She competed at the 2019 Women's European Volleyball Championship.

== Clubs ==
- (Slovakia) VKM Piešťany (2010–2014)
- (Slovakia) COP NITRA (2014–2016)
- (Slovakia) Volley project UKF Nitra (2016–2018)
- (Slovakia) Strabag VC FTVŠ UK Bratislava (2018–2019)
