= Slovakia women's national volleyball team =

Women's national volleyball team representing Slovakia

Slovakia
- Nickname(s): Repre
- Association: SVF
- Confederation: CEV
- Head coach: (Slovakia) Michal Mašek
- FIVB ranking: 34 ▼1 (24 May 2026)

Uniforms
Home	Away

First international
- Slovakia - Switzerland 3:2 (23 April 1993)

Summer Olympics
- Appearances: none

World Championship
- Appearances: 1 (First in 2025)
- Best result: 30th place (2025)

World Cup
- Appearances: none

European Championship
- Appearances: 7 (First in 2003)
- Best result: 9th place (2003)
- www.svf.sk (in Slovak)
Honours
European League
Silver medal – second place	2016 Slovakia/Azerbaijan
Bronze medal – third place	2017 Finland/Ukraine

The Slovakia women's national volleyball team represents Slovakia in international women's volleyball competitions and friendly matches.

== Competition record ==
=== World Championship ===
Champions Runners-up Third place Fourth place

World Championship record
Year	Round	Position	Pld	W	L	SW	SL	Squad
(Thailand) 2025	Preliminary Round	30th	3	0	3	1	9	Squad
(Canada) (United States) 2027	To be determined							
(Philippines) 2029	To be determined							
Total	0 Titles	1/22	3	0	3	1	9	—

=== European Championship ===
Champions Runners-up Third place Fourth place

European Championship record
Year	Round	Position	Pld	W	L	SW	SL	Squad	
(Netherlands) 1995	Did not qualify								
(Czech Republic) 1997	Did not qualify								
(Italy) 1999	Did not qualify								
(Bulgaria) 2001	Did not qualify								
(Turkey) 2003	Preliminary round	9th	5	0	5	2	15	Squad	
(Croatia) 2005	Did not qualify								
(Belgium) / (Luxembourg) 2007	Preliminary round	13th	3	1	2	3	8	Squad	
(Poland) 2009	Preliminary round	13th	3	1	2	5	8	Squad	
(Italy) / (Serbia) 2011	Did not qualify								
(Germany) / (Switzerland) 2013	Did not qualify								
(Netherlands) / (Belgium) 2015	Did not qualify								
(Azerbaijan) / (Georgia (country)) 2017	Did not qualify								
(Slovakia) / (Hungary) / (Poland) / (Turkey) 2019	Round of 16	12th	6	3	3	10	11	Squad	
(Serbia) / (Bulgaria) / (Croatia) / (Romania) 2021	Preliminary round	17th	5	1	4	7	13	Squad	
(Belgium) / (Italy) / (Estonia) / (Germany) 2023	Round of 16	10th	6	3	3	11	10	Squad	
(Turkey) / (Czech Republic) / (Sweden) / (Azerbaijan) 2026	Preliminary round	18th	5	1	4	7	12	Squad	
(Slovakia) / (Spain) / (N/A) / (N/A) 2028	Qualified as co-host								
Total	Qualified		8/17	33	10	23	45	77	—

=== European League ===
Champions Runners-up Third place Fourth place

European League record
Year	Round	Position	Pld	W	L	SW	SL	Squad
(Turkey) 2009	Did not compete							
(Turkey) 2010	Did not compete							
(Turkey) 2011	Did not compete							
(Czech Republic) 2012	Did not compete							
(Bulgaria) 2013	Did not compete							
(European Union) 2014	Did not compete							
(European Union) 2015	Did not compete							
(European Union) 2016	Final	2nd place, silver medalist(s)	10	7	3	23	19	Squad
(European Union) 2017	Semifinals	3rd place, bronze medalist(s)	8	4	4	13	12	Squad
(Hungary) 2018	League Round	9th	6	2	4	9	15	Squad
(Croatia) 2019	League Round	7th	6	4	2	13	10	Squad
(Bulgaria) 2021	League Round	6th	4	1	3	5	10	Squad
(France) 2022	League Round	9th	4	0	4	4	12	Squad
(European Union) 2023	League Round	6th	4	2	2	7	8	Squad
(Czech Republic) 2024	League Round	7th	6	3	3	9	11	Squad
(Sweden) 2025	League Round	6th	6	3	3	9	10	Squad
(European Union) 2026	Semifinals	4th	8	6	2	18	8	Squad
Total	Competed: 10/17		62	32	30	110	115	—

== Team ==
=== Current squad ===
The following is the Slovak roster in the 2019 European Championship.

Head coach: Martino Volpini

Assistant coach: Andrea Carasi

No.	Name	Date of birth	Height	Weight	Spike	Block	2018–19 club
2	Barbora Koseková	22 November 1994	1.78 m (5 ft 10 in)	71 kg (157 lb)	280 cm (110 in)	268 cm (106 in)	(Slovakia) Pezinok
3	Romana Hudecová	21 September 1993	1.78 m (5 ft 10 in)	63 kg (139 lb)	310 cm (120 in)	294 cm (116 in)	(Slovakia) BVK Bratislava
4	Veronika Hrončeková	2 January 1990	1.92 m (6 ft 4 in)	71 kg (157 lb)	315 cm (124 in)	295 cm (116 in)	(Slovakia) BVK Bratislava
6	Karin Palgutová	12 February 1993	1.86 m (6 ft 1 in)	79 kg (174 lb)	303 cm (119 in)	292 cm (115 in)	(France) Quimper Volley 29
7	Michaela Španková	1 August 1999	1.69 m (5 ft 7 in)	63 kg (139 lb)	281 cm (111 in)	262 cm (103 in)	(Slovakia) BVK Bratislava
8	Miroslava Kijaková	5 May 1988	1.80 m (5 ft 11 in)	69 kg (152 lb)	305 cm (120 in)	295 cm (116 in)	(Cyprus) Anorthosis Famagusta
9	Jaroslava Pencová	24 June 1990	1.91 m (6 ft 3 in)	81 kg (179 lb)	308 cm (121 in)	295 cm (116 in)	(Poland) Budowlani Łódź
10	Nina Herelová	30 July 1993	1.84 m (6 ft 0 in)	70 kg (150 lb)	296 cm (117 in)	286 cm (113 in)	(Poland) Bielsko-Biała
12	Nikola Radosová	3 May 1992	1.86 m (6 ft 1 in)	66 kg (146 lb)	310 cm (120 in)	295 cm (116 in)	(Germany) Dresdner SC
13	Lenka Ovečková	16 November 1995	1.75 m (5 ft 9 in)	69 kg (152 lb)	291 cm (115 in)	280 cm (110 in)	(Slovakia) BVK Bratislava
14	Sandra Szabóová	22 July 1996	1.90 m (6 ft 3 in)	71 kg (157 lb)	300 cm (120 in)	288 cm (113 in)	(Germany) Potsdam
15	Karolína Fričová	29 April 2000	1.79 m (5 ft 10 in)	67 kg (148 lb)	297 cm (117 in)	282 cm (111 in)	(Slovakia) Slávia Bratislava
16	Skarleta Jančová	16 January 1997	1.67 m (5 ft 6 in)	58 kg (128 lb)	279 cm (110 in)	258 cm (102 in)	(Slovakia) BVK Bratislava
22	Mária Kostelanská	8 January 1993	1.75 m (5 ft 9 in)	68 kg (150 lb)	287 cm (113 in)	280 cm (110 in)	(Hungary) Vasas Budapest

=== Former squads ===
- 2003 Women's European Volleyball Championship — 9th place
  Petronela Biksadská, Lucia Bognarová, Danica Hanzelová, Lucia Hatinová, Simona Kleskenová, Renata Kolenaková, Petra Maleková, Adriana Marceková, Andrea Pavelková, Alica Székelyová, Gabriela Tomaseková, and Martina Viestová.
- 2007 Women's European Volleyball Championship — 13th place
  Petronela Biksadská, Ivana Bramborová, Jana Gogolová, Daniela Gonciová, Lucia Hatinová, Veronika Hrončeková, Simona Kleskeňová, Veronika Krajčová, Paula Kubová, Martina Noseková, Alica Székelyová, and Martina Viestová. Head Coach: Miroslav Cada.

== See also ==
- Czechoslovakia women's national volleyball team
- Slovakia men's national volleyball team
