= Paula Kubová =

Slovak volleyball player (born 1986)

Personal information
- Nationality: Slovakia
- Born: 28 May 1986 (age 40); Liptovský Mikuláš, Czechoslovakia
- Height: 1.83 m (6 ft 0 in)
- Weight: 76 kg (168 lb)
- Spike: 293 cm (115 in)
- Block: 276 cm (109 in)

Volleyball information
- Position: Opposite
- Current club: SG VB NÖ Sokol/Post
- Number: 16 (national team); 10 (club)

National team
2007–	Slovakia
Honours
Women's volleyball
Representing Slovakia
European League
Silver medal – second place	2016	Team
- Last updated: 27 April 2017

Paula Kubová (born 28 May 1986 in Liptovský Mikuláš) is a Slovak female volleyball player. She has been part of the Slovakia women's national volleyball team since 2007, having played in the 2007 Women's European Volleyball Championship and won a silver medal at the 2016 Women's European Volleyball League.

At club level she plays for Austrian club SG VB NÖ Sokol/Post.

== Clubs ==
- (Slovakia) VK SKM Liptovský Hrádok (?–?)
- (Slovakia) VTC Pezinok (2005–2006)
- (Slovakia) Doprastav Bratislava (2006–2010)
- (Czech Republic) TJ Sokol Frýdek-Místek (2010–2011)
- (Slovakia) VK Spišská Nová Ves (2011–2013)
- (Czech Republic) TJ Sokol Frýdek-Místek (2013–2015)
- (Czech Republic) VK UP Olomouc (2015–2016)
- (Austria) SG VB NÖ Sokol/Post (2016–present)

== Awards ==
=== National team ===
- 2016 Women's European Volleyball League — Silver medal

=== Club ===
- 2005–06 Slovak Cup — Silver medal (with VTC Pezinok)
- 2007–08 Slovak Cup — Gold medal (with Doprastav Bratislava)
- 2007–08 Slovak Championship — Bronze medal (with Doprastav Bratislava)
- 2008–09 Slovak Cup — Gold medal (with Doprastav Bratislava)
- 2008–09 Slovak Championship — Gold medal (with Doprastav Bratislava)
- 2009–10 Slovak Cup — Silver medal (with Doprastav Bratislava)
- 2009–10 Slovak Championship — Bronze medal (with Doprastav Bratislava)
- 2014–15 Czech Championship — Bronze medal (with TJ Sokol Frýdek-Místek)
- 2015–16 Czech Championship — Silver medal (with VK UP Olomouc)
- 2016–17 Austrian Championship — Gold medal (with VB NÖ Sokol/Post)
