= Lenka Ovečková =

Slovak volleyball player

Personal information
- Nationality: Slovak
- Born: 16 November 1995 (age 30); Bratislava, Slovakia
- Height: 1.75 m (5 ft 9 in)
- Weight: 69 kg (152 lb)
- Spike: 291 cm (115 in)
- Block: 280 cm (110 in)

Volleyball information
- Position: Setter
- Current club: (Czech Republic) PVK Olymp Praha
- Number: 13

Career
Years	Teams
2019–current	PVK Olymp Praha

National team
2016–present	Slovakia
Honours
Women's volleyball
Representing Slovakia
European League
Silver medal – second place	2016 Slovakia/Azerbaijan
Bronze medal – third place	2017 Finland/Ukraine

Lenka Ovečková (born 16 November 1995) is a Slovak female volleyball player. She is part of the Slovakia women's national volleyball team. She competed at the 2019 Women's European Volleyball Championship.

== Clubs ==
- (Slovakia) ŠŠK Bilíkova Bratislava (none–2012)
- (Slovakia) VISTA real Pezinok (2012–2013)
- (Slovakia) Doprastav Bratislava (2012–2014)
- (Slovakia) BVK Bratislava (2014–2017)
- (Slovakia) Strabag VC FTVŠ UK Bratislava (2017–2019)
- (Czech Republic) PVK Olymp Praha (2019–present)
