= Karin Palgutová =

Slovak volleyball player

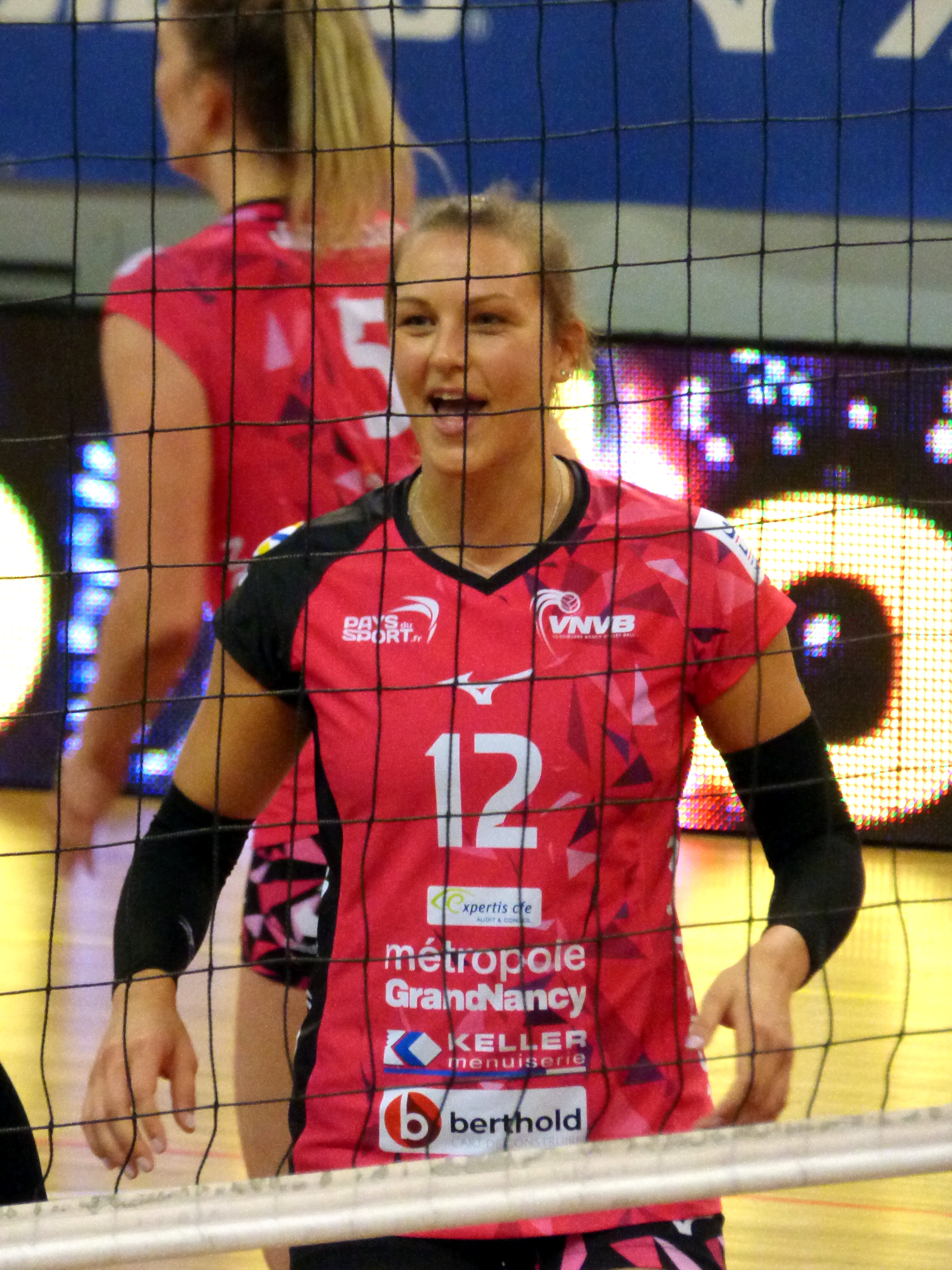

Personal information
- Nationality: Slovak
- Born: 12 February 1993 (age 33); Bratislava, Slovakia
- Height: 1.86 m (6 ft 1 in)
- Weight: 79 kg (174 lb)
- Spike: 303 cm (119 in)
- Block: 292 cm (115 in)

Volleyball information
- Position: Opposite
- Current club: (France) Vandoeuvre Nancy Volley-Ball
- Number: 10

Career
| Years | Teams |
|---|---|
| 2019–current | Vandoeuvre Nancy Volley-Ball |

National team
| 2009–present | Slovakia |
Honours
Women's volleyball
Representing Slovakia
European League
| Silver medal – second place | 2016 Slovakia/Azerbaijan |
| Bronze medal – third place | 2017 Finland/Ukraine |

Karin Palgutová (born 12 February 1993) is a Slovak female volleyball player. She is part of the Slovakia women's national volleyball team. She competed at the 2019 Women's European Volleyball Championship.

== Clubs ==
- (Slovakia) ŠŠK Bilíkova Bratislava (2006–2009)
- (Slovakia) Doprastav Bratislava (2009–2012)
- (United States) St. John's University (2012–2016)
- (Switzerland) Volley Lugano (2016–2017)
- (France) Quimper Volley 29 (2017–2019)
- (France) Vandoeuvre Nancy Volley-Ball (2019–present)
