= Nikola Radosová =

Slovak volleyball player (born 1992)

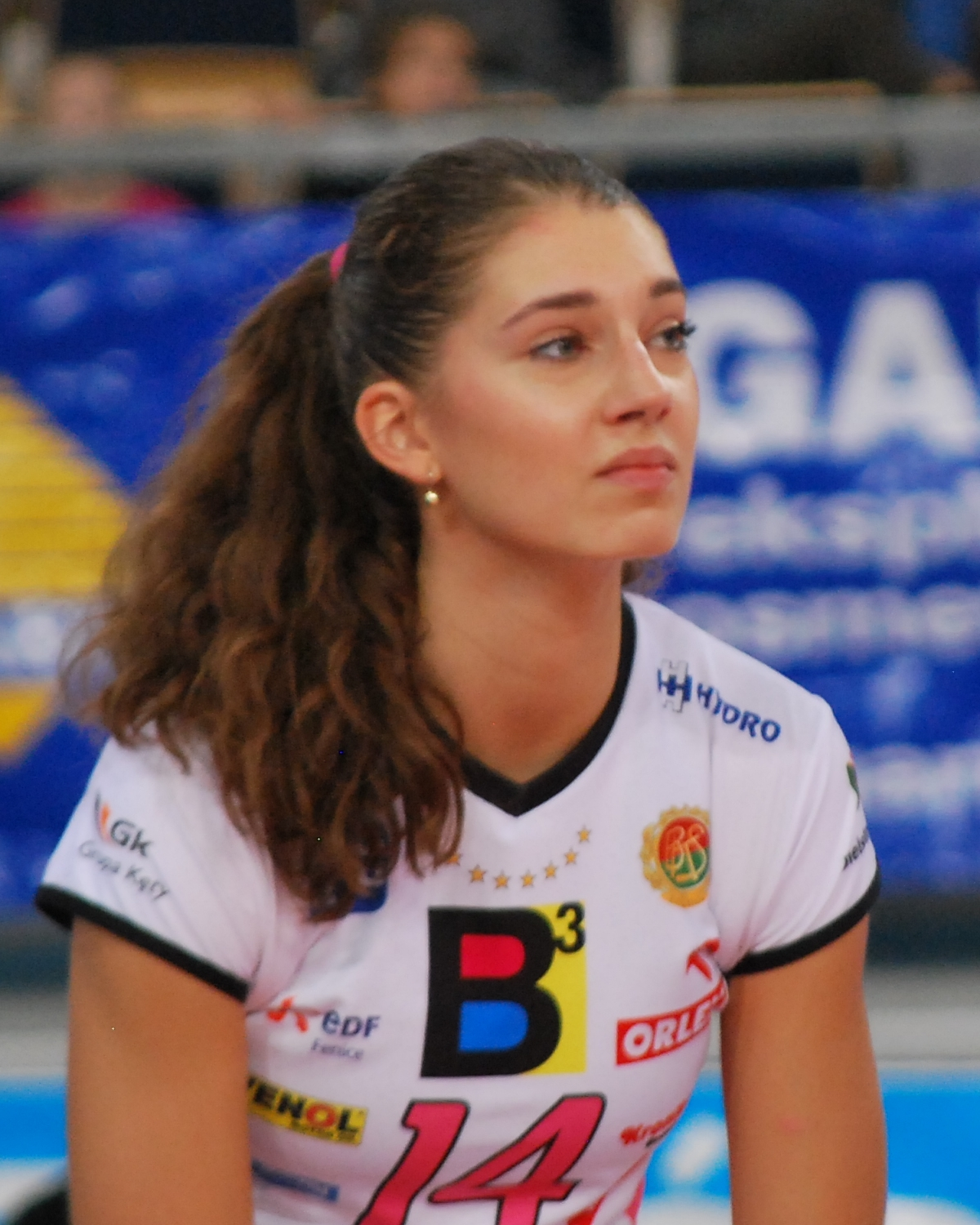

Personal information
- Nationality: Slovak
- Born: 3 May 1992 (age 34); Bojnice, Czechoslovakia
- Height: 1.86 m (6 ft 1 in)
- Weight: 66 kg (146 lb)
- Spike: 310 cm (120 in)
- Block: 295 cm (116 in)

Volleyball information
- Position: Outside-spiker
- Current club: (Germany) Dresdner SC
- Number: 14

Career
Years	Teams
2018-current	Futam-Nyíregyháza

National team
2012–present	Slovakia
Honours
Women's volleyball
Representing Slovakia
European League
Silver medal – second place	2016 Slovakia/Azerbaijan

Nikola Radosová (born 3 May 1992) is a Slovak female volleyball player. She is part of the Slovakia women's national volleyball team. She competed at the 2019 Women's European Volleyball Championship.

== Clubs ==
- (Slovakia) VK Prievidza (2002–2007)
- (Slovakia) COP Nitra (2007–2008)
- (Austria) SVS Post Schwechat (2008–2013)
- (Germany) SC Potsdam (2013–2015)
- (Poland) BKS Bielsko-Biała (2015–2016)
- (Romania) CSM București (2016–2018)
- (Germany) Dresdner SC (2018–present)
