= Nina Herelová =

Slovak volleyball player (born 1993)

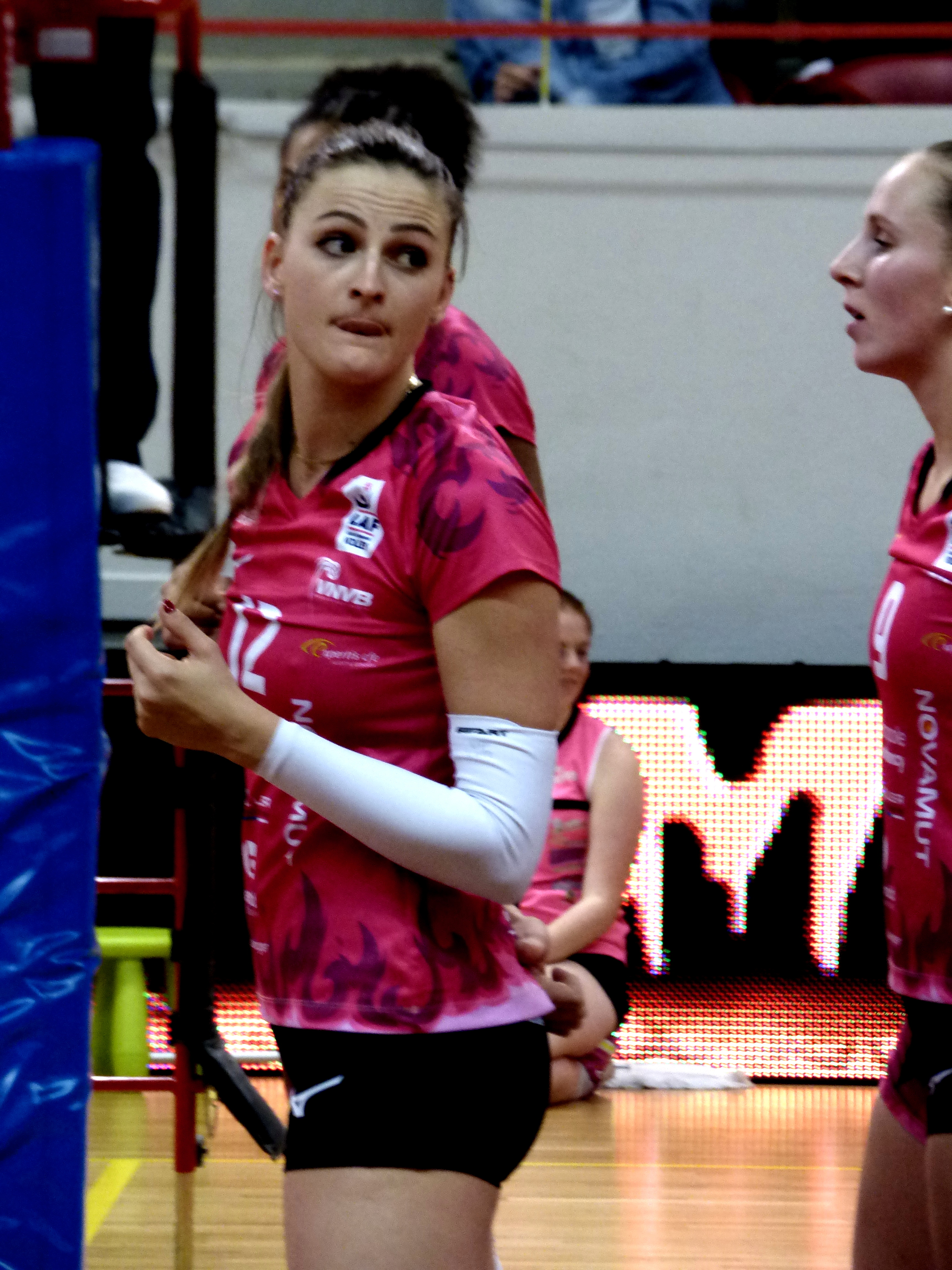
- Herelová in 2019

Personal information
- Nationality: Slovak
- Born: 30 July 1993 (age 33); Bojnice, Slovakia
- Height: 1.85 m (6 ft 1 in)
- Weight: 70 kg (154 lb)
- Spike: 296 cm (117 in)
- Block: 286 cm (113 in)

Volleyball information
- Position: Middle blocker
- Number: 10

National team
2013–present	Slovakia
Honours
Women's volleyball
Representing Slovakia
European League
Bronze medal – third place	2017 Finland/Ukraine

Nina Herelová (born 30 July 1993) is a Slovak female volleyball player. She is part of the Slovakia women's national volleyball team. She competed at the 2019 Women's European Volleyball Championship.

== Clubs ==
- (Slovakia) VK Prievidza (2005–2008)
- (Slovakia) COP Nitra (2008–2010)
- (Slovakia) Slávia UK Bratislava (2010–2013)
- (Austria) SVS Post Schwechat (2013–2015)
- (Czech Republic) VK Prostějov (2015–2018)
- (Poland) BKS Bielsko-Biała (2018–2019)
- (France) Vandeuvre Nancy Volley-Ball (2019–present)
