= Alica Székelyová =

Slovak volleyball player (born 1981)

Personal information
- Full name: Alica Székelyová Sokolov
- Nickname: Elis
- Nationality: Slovak
- Born: 5 January 1981 (age 45); Prešov
- Height: 184 cm (6 ft 0 in)
- Weight: 70 kg (154 lb)
- Spike: 307 cm (121 in)
- Block: 292 cm (115 in)

Volleyball information
- Position: setter
- Number: 14 (national team)

Career
Years	Teams
1995-2003	Slávia UK Bratislava (Slovakia)
2003-2004	ICOT Forli (Italy)
2004-2005	Terra Sarda Tortolì (Italy)
2005-2006	Santeramo in Colle (Italy)
2006-2007	Universidad de Burgos (Spain)
2007-2008	Stinol Lipetsk (Russia)
2008-2010	Dinamo Bucharest (Romania)
2010-2011	TED Koleji Ankara (Turkey)
2011-2012	Ilbank Ankara (Turkey)

National team
2007	Slovakia

Alica Székelyová (born 5 January 1981) was a Slovak female volleyball player, playing as a setter. She was part of the Slovakia women's national volleyball team.

She competed at the 2006 FIVB Volleyball Women's World Championship qualifications, and 2007 Women's European Volleyball Championship. On club level she played for Diego Porcelos in 2007.
