= Janco =

Janco (feminine: Jancová) and Jančo (feminine: Jančová) are Slovak surnames. Jancó is a Portuguese surname. Janco also appears as a given name. Notable people with the name include:

== Surname ==
- Denis Jančo (born 1997), Slovak footballer
- Rebeka Jančová (born 2003), Slovak alpine ski racer
- Skarleta Jančová (born 1997), Slovak volleyball player
- Tereza Jančová (born 1999), Slovak alpine ski racer
- Wilson Jancó (born 1994), Portuguese footballer

== Given name ==
- Janco Venter (born 1994), Namibian rugby union player

== Alternative name ==
- Marcel Janco, common rendition of Marcel Hermann Iancu (1895–1984), Romanian-Israeli visual artist and architect
- Tania Janco, pseudonym of Taťána Jandová-Vácová (born 1955), Czech-Mexican artist

== See also ==
- Ianco
