= Jančová =

Jančová or Jancová is a feminine surname. It may be:

- The feminine form of the Czech surname Janča
  - Monika Jančová (born 1992), Czech slalom canoeist
- The feminine form of the surname Janca
- The feminine form of the surname Janec
- The feminine form of the Slovak surname Jančo
