= Martina Noseková =

Slovak volleyball player (born 1985)

Personal information
- Nationality: Slovak
- Born: 1 April 1985 (age 41)

Volleyball information
- Position: Opposite

Career
Years	Teams
2011-2012	Olympiacos

National team
Slovakia

Martina Noseková (born 1 April 1985) is a Slovak female volleyball player, playing as an opposite. She was part of the Slovakia women's national volleyball team. She competed at the 2009 Women's European Volleyball Championship.
