= Ivana Bramborová =

Slovak volleyball player (born 1985)

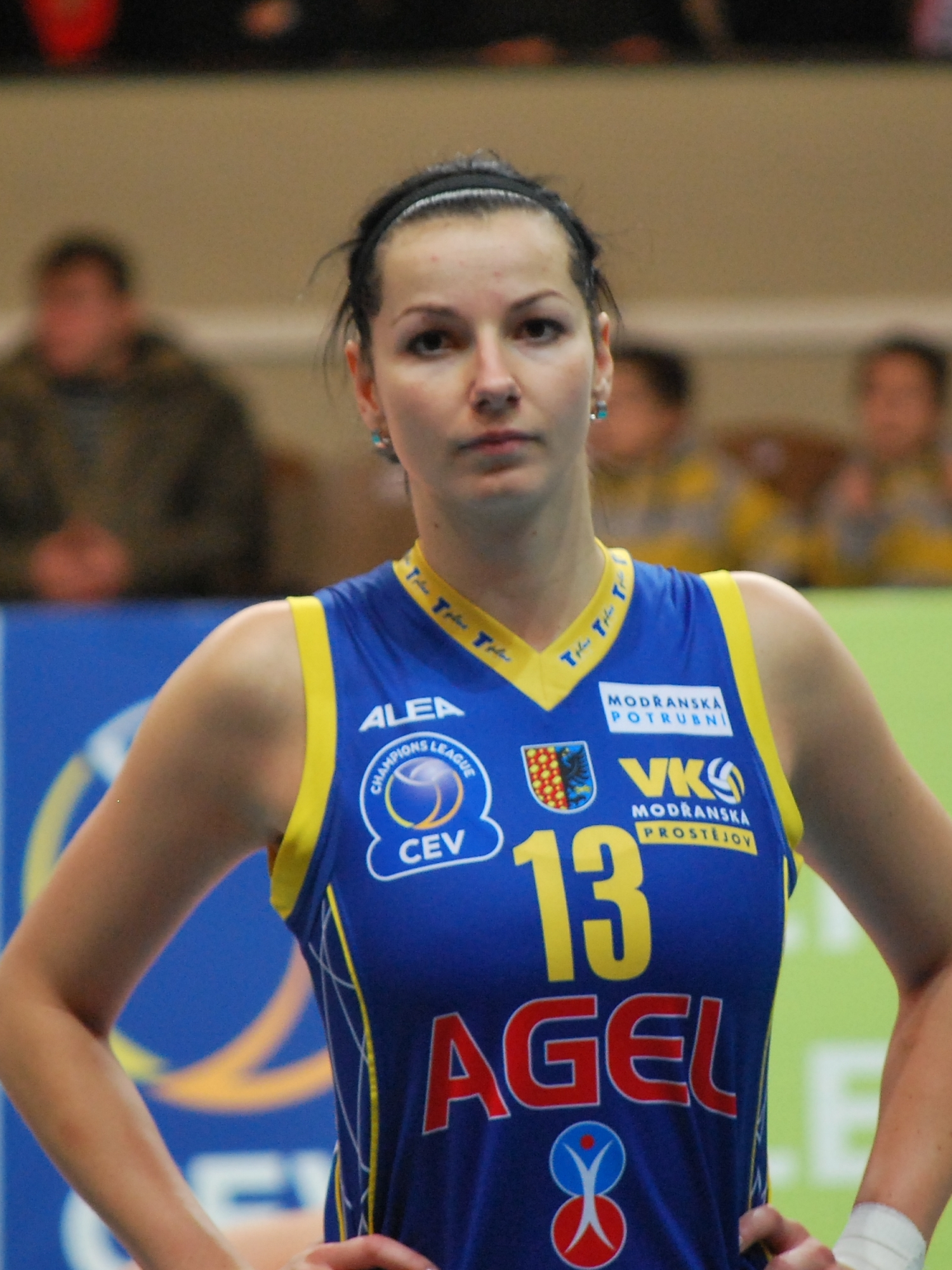

Personal information
- Nationality: Slovak
- Born: 11 April 1985 (age 41)

Volleyball information
- Position: Outside-spiker

Career
Years	Teams
2009	Vk Prostějov

National team
Slovakia

Ivana Bramborová (born 11 April 1985) is a Slovak female former volleyball player, playing as an outside-spiker. She was part of the Slovakia women's national volleyball team. She competed at the 2009 Women's European Volleyball Championship.
