= Mária Žernovič =

Slovak volleyball player (born 1993)

Mária Žernovič (Kostelanská)

Personal information
- Nationality: Slovak
- Born: 8 January 1993 (age 33); Považská Bystrica, Slovakia
- Height: 1.75 m (5 ft 9 in)
- Weight: 68 kg (150 lb)
- Spike: 287 cm (113 in)
- Block: 280 cm (110 in)

Volleyball information
- Position: Outside-spiker
- Current club: (Hungary) Vasas Budapest
- Number: 6

Career
Years	Teams
2017–current	Vasas Budapest

National team
2018–present	Slovakia

Mária Žernovič (née Kostelanská; born 8 January 1993) is a Slovak female volleyball player. She is part of the Slovakia women's national volleyball team. She competed at the 2019 Women's European Volleyball Championship.

== Clubs ==
- (Slovakia) ŠŠK OA Považská Bystrica (none–2012)
- (Slovakia) VTC Pezinok (2012–2016)
- (Slovakia) Hit UCM Trnava (2016–2017)
- (Hungary) Vasas Budapest (2017–present)
