= Skarleta Jančová =

Slovak volleyball player

Personal information
- Nationality: Slovak
- Born: 16 January 1997 (age 29); Levice, Slovakia
- Height: 1.67 m (5 ft 5 1/2 in)
- Weight: 58 kg (128 lb)
- Spike: 279 cm (110 in)
- Block: 258 cm (102 in)

Volleyball information
- Position: Libero
- Current club: (Slovakia) Strabag VC FTVŠ UK Bratislava

Career
Years	Teams
2017–current	Strabag VC FTVŠ UK Bratislava

National team
2018–present	Slovakia

Skarleta Jančová (born 16 January 1997) is a Slovak volleyball player. She is part of the Slovakia women's national volleyball team. She competed at the 2019 Women's European Volleyball Championship.

== Clubs ==
- (Slovakia) Palas VK Levice (none–2014)
- (Slovakia) COP Nitra (2014–2015)
- (Slovakia) Strabag VC FTVŠ UK Bratislava (2016–2018)
