= Ianco =

Ianco is a Romanian language surname. Notable people with the name include:

- Josine Ianco-Starrels (1926–2019), Romanian-born American art curator
- Marcel Ianco (1895–1984), Romanian and Israeli visual artist, architect and art theorist

== See also ==
- Janco
