= Simge Şebnem Aköz =

Turkish volleyball player

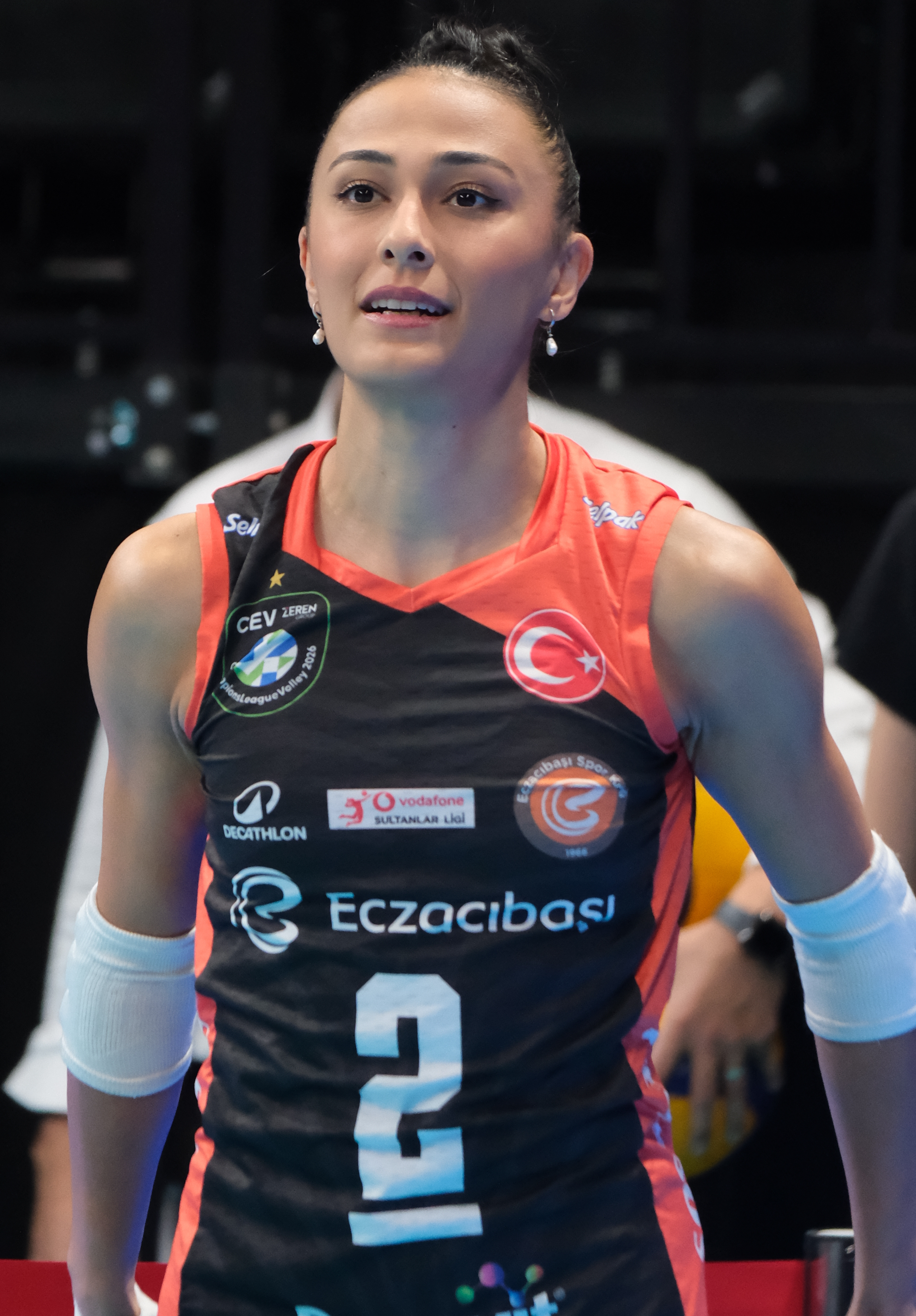

Personal information
- Nickname: Atom Ant
- Nationality: Turkish
- Born: 23 April 1991 (age 35); Samsun, Turkey
- Height: 1.68 m (5 ft 6 in)
- Weight: 55 kg (121 lb)
- Spike: 250 cm (98 in)
- Block: 245 cm (96 in)

Volleyball information
- Position: Libero
- Current club: Eczacıbaşı VitrA
- Number: 2

National team
Turkey
Honours
Representing Turkey
European Championship
Gold medal – first place	2023 Belgium/Italy/Estonia/Germany	Team
Silver medal – second place	2019 Turkey	Team
Bronze medal – third place	2017 Azerbaijan/Georgia	Team
Bronze medal – third place	2021 Serbia/Bulgaria/Croatia/Romania	Team
FIVB Nations League
Gold medal – first place	2023 Arlington	Team
Silver medal – second place	2018 Nanjing	Team
Bronze medal – third place	2021 Rimini	Team

Simge Şebnem Aköz (born 23 April 1991) is a Turkish professional volleyball player for Eczacıbaşı VitrA and the Turkish national team.

She participated at the 2017 Women's European Volleyball Championship, and 2018 FIVB Volleyball Women's Nations League.

Aköz was named to the 2020 (Held in 2021) Tokyo Olympic roster where her team finished 6th.

== Awards ==
=== Club ===
- 2016 Club World Championship - Champion, with Eczacibasi Vitra
- 2016-17 CEV champion League - Bronze Medal, with Eczacibasi Vitra
- 2017-18 CEV Cup - Champion, with Eczacibasi Vitra
- 2017-18 Turkish Cup - Runner-Up, with Eczacibasi Vitra
- 2017-18 Turkish League - Runner-Up, with Eczacibasi
- 2018 Spor Toto Champion's Cup (Turkish Super Cup) - Champion, with Eczacibasi Vitra
- 2018 Club world Championship - Bronze Medal, with Eczacibasi Vitra
- 2019 AXA Insurance Cup Championship (Turkish Cup) - Champion, with Eczacibasi Vitra
- 2018-19 Turkish League - Runner-Up, with Eczacibasi Vitra
- 2019 Spor Toto Champion's Cup (Turkish Super Cup) - Champion, with Eczacibasi Vitra
- 2019 Club world Championship - Runner-Up, with Eczacibasi Vitra
- 2020 AXA Sigorta Champions Cup (Turkish Super Cup) - Champion, with Eczacibasi Vitra
- 2021-22 CEV Cup - Champion, with Eczacibasi Dynavit

=== Individuals ===
- 2019 European Championship "Best Libero"
- 2019 FIVB Volleyball Women's Club World Championship "Best Libero"

=== National team ===
- 2017 European Championship - Bronze Medal
- 2018 Nations League - Silver Medal
- 2019 European Championship - Silver Medal
- 2021 Nations League - Bronze Medal
- 2021 European Championship - Bronze Medal
- 2023 Nations League - Gold Medal
- 2023 European Championship – Gold Medal
- 2023 World Cup – Gold Medal
