= Petronela Biksadská =

Slovak volleyball player (born 1982)

Petronela Biksadska (born October 4, 1982) is a Slovak former volleyball player. She is 185 cm tall and plays as an outside hitter. She was named the best Slovak player of the years 2007 and 2008.

She represented Slovakia at the 2003 and 2007 editions of the European Championships, but missed the event in 2009 due to a shoulder injury.

Biksadská began to play volleyball in primary school, then for the Senica (SVK), Olomouc (CZE), Dyo Karsiyaka Izmir (TUR) teams. She signed a contract with Czech club VK Prostějov (which played Champions League that season and next seasons) in 2009, but the club cancelled the contract as her shoulder injury had adversely affected her play.

Biksadská then moved to Senica, recovered from the injury and started to play again after a three-month break. She was the best player in the 2010 semifinal, and the team made it to the final for the first time since 2007 - but lost to Slavia UK.

After the 2010 season VK Senica had financial problems and ended the professional activity, and despite offers from other clubs, Biksadská decided to end her volleyball career.
