= Tania Janco =

Czech and Mexican artist (born 1955)

- Taťána Jandová-Vácová
- Born: 4 October 1955 (age 70); Prague, Czechoslovakia
- Website: https://www.facebook.com/tania.janco

Tania Janco (born Taťána Jandová-Vácová 4 October 1955) is a Czech-Mexican artist, known for her painting and print work, especially in the illustration of children's books. Her work has been recognized the Caravelle D’ora Prize in Italy and membership in the Salón de la Plástica Mexicana.

== Biography ==
Janco was born Taťána Jandová-Vácová on 4 October 1955 in Prague (then Czechoslovakia). She began her studies in fine arts and design in high school in Prague and eventually obtained her master's degree in graphic arts at the Academy of San Carlos in Mexico City.

Her shown in various countries such as the Czech Republic, Slovakia, Russia, the United States, Mexico, South Korea, Spain and England. Individual exhibitions include those at the state legislature of the State of Mexico, (2005), Magical World, Czech Republic (2002), Coordinación General de los Asuntos Metropolitanos, State of Mexico (2001), Centro Deportivo Israelita, Mexico City (2001), Universidad Iberoamericana (1994, 1999), Sheraton Hotel, Mexico City (1999), Casa Foro Cultural de Magdalena Contreras, Mexico City (1994), A Negra Gallery, Coyoacán, Mexico City (1993), Embassy of the Czech Republic in Mexico (1992) and the Benar Cultural Center, Czech Republic.(1984) . In addition her work has appeared in collective shows in venues such as the Palacio de Bellas Artes, Universidad Iberoamericana, the international exhibition of the Consejo Nacional de Artistas Visuales in Tlaxcala, galleries in San Francisco and others.

She has worked extensively with publishers in Mexico and the Czech Republic, and has worked as a set and costume designer for various theatrical productionsin the Czech Republic.

She was the art director for the film Otaola o La República del Exilio (2001), directed by Raúl Busteros in Mexico.

Since 1993 she has been a professor of art at the Universidad Iberoamericana, and in 1994 she founded the Bohemia Taller Libre de Grabado Artístico in Mexico.

Her work has won awards in Mexico, Cuba and the Czech Republic in the fields of print, illustrations for children's books and painting. From 1981 to 2001, she won various awards at art completions such as the International Children and Youth Book Fair in Mexico and the Caravelle D’ora in Italy. Janco was inducted into the Salón de la Plástica Mexicana in 2005.
