= 2009 Women's European Volleyball Championship =

Tournament details
- Host country: Poland
- Dates: 25 September – 4 October
- Teams: 16
- Venue: 4 (in 4 host cities)

Final positions
- Champions: Italy (2nd title)

Tournament awards
- MVP: (Netherlands) Manon Flier

The 2009 Women's European Volleyball Championship was the 26th edition of the European Volleyball Championship, organised by Europe's governing volleyball body, the Confédération Européenne de Volleyball. The cities that hosted matches were Bydgoszcz, Łódź, Katowice and Wrocław in Poland, from 25 September to 4 October 2009.

== Qualification ==
| Team | Method of qualification |
|---|---|
| Azerbaijan | Qualification play-offs |
| Belarus | Qualification play-offs |
| Belgium | 2007 edition seventh place |
| Bulgaria | Qualification group E winners |
| Croatia | Qualification play-offs |
| Czech Republic | Qualification group B winners |
| France | Qualification group D winners |
| Germany | 2007 edition sixth place |
| Italy | 2007 edition first place |
| Netherlands | 2007 edition fifth place |
| Poland | Hosts |
| Russia | 2007 edition third place |
| Serbia | 2007 edition second place |
| Slovakia | Qualification group A winners |
| Spain | Qualification group C winners |
| Turkey | Qualification group F winners |

== Format ==
The tournament was played in three different stages. In the first stage, the sixteen participants were divided in four groups (A, B, C and D) of four teams each. A single round-robin format was played within each group to determine the teams group position, the three best teams of each group (total of 12 teams) progressed to the second stage.

The second stage of the tournament consisted of two groups of six teams each. As the first stage match results amongst the teams which advanced to this stage also counted, the two groups have been predetermined, one group formed by groups A and C teams while the other was formed by groups B and D teams. In each of the two groups, the teams played once against every opponent they haven not faced in the tournament (total of three matches each), adding that to the results obtained against the other two teams who also advanced from the first stage same group. The two group winners and two runners-up from this second stage advanced the third stage.

The third and final stage of the tournament was composed of the semifinals, third place match and final. A drawing of lots decided which winner played which runner-up in the semifinals.

== Pools composition ==
| Pool A | Pool B | Pool C | Pool D |
|---|---|---|---|
| Croatia | France | Belarus | Azerbaijan |
| Netherlands | Germany | Belgium | Czech Republic |
| Poland | Italy | Bulgaria | Serbia |
| Spain | Turkey | Russia | Slovakia |

== Venues ==
The tournament was played at four venues in four cities throughout Poland. Each city hosted a group stage. Łódź and Katowice hosted the two Playoff Rounds. Łódź also concluded the Championship with the Semifinals & Final.

| Pools A, E and Final round | Pool B | Host cities of the tournament |
| Łódź | Wrocław | Host cities of the tournament |
| Atlas Arena | Hala Stulecia | Host cities of the tournament |
| Capacity: 13,500 | Capacity: 7,000 | Host cities of the tournament |
| Pool C | Pools D and F | Host cities of the tournament |
| Bydgoszcz | Katowice | Host cities of the tournament |
| Łuczniczka | Spodek | Host cities of the tournament |
| Capacity: 8,000 | Capacity: 11,500 | Host cities of the tournament |

== Preliminary round ==
- All times are Central European Summer Time (UTC+02:00).

=== Pool A ===
- venue: Arena Łódź, Łódź

| Pos | Team | Pld | W | L | Pts | SW | SL | SR | SPW | SPL | SPR | Qualification |
|---|---|---|---|---|---|---|---|---|---|---|---|---|
| 1 | Netherlands | 3 | 3 | 0 | 6 | 9 | 0 | MAX | 225 | 140 | 1.607 | Pool E |
| 2 | Poland | 3 | 2 | 1 | 5 | 6 | 5 | 1.200 | 236 | 218 | 1.083 | Pool E |
| 3 | Spain | 3 | 1 | 2 | 4 | 5 | 8 | 0.625 | 243 | 282 | 0.862 | Pool E |
| 4 | Croatia | 3 | 0 | 3 | 3 | 2 | 9 | 0.222 | 188 | 252 | 0.746 | |

| Date | Time | | Score | | Set 1 | Set 2 | Set 3 | Set 4 | Set 5 | Total | Report |
|---|---|---|---|---|---|---|---|---|---|---|---|
| 25 Sep | 17:30 | Netherlands | 3–0 | Croatia | 25–11 | 25–18 | 25–12 | | | 75–41 | Report |
| 25 Sep | 20:00 | Spain | 2–3 | Poland | 15–25 | 20–25 | 25–19 | 25–23 | 11–15 | 96–107 | Report |
| 26 Sep | 17:30 | Poland | 3–0 | Croatia | 25–18 | 25–13 | 25–16 | | | 75–47 | Report |
| 26 Sep | 20:00 | Spain | 0–3 | Netherlands | 17–25 | 13–25 | 15–25 | | | 45–75 | Report |
| 27 Sep | 17:00 | Poland | 0–3 | Netherlands | 18–25 | 13–25 | 23–25 | | | 54–75 | Report |
| 27 Sep | 20:00 | Croatia | 2–3 | Spain | 25–15 | 22–25 | 15–25 | 25–22 | 13–15 | 100–102 | Report |

=== Pool B ===
- venue: Centennial Hall, Wrocław

| Pos | Team | Pld | W | L | Pts | SW | SL | SR | SPW | SPL | SPR | Qualification |
|---|---|---|---|---|---|---|---|---|---|---|---|---|
| 1 | Italy | 3 | 3 | 0 | 6 | 9 | 1 | 9.000 | 248 | 193 | 1.285 | Pool F |
| 2 | Germany | 3 | 2 | 1 | 5 | 6 | 6 | 1.000 | 262 | 265 | 0.989 | Pool F |
| 3 | Turkey | 3 | 1 | 2 | 4 | 5 | 6 | 0.833 | 228 | 227 | 1.004 | Pool F |
| 4 | France | 3 | 0 | 3 | 3 | 2 | 9 | 0.222 | 217 | 270 | 0.804 | |

| Date | Time | | Score | | Set 1 | Set 2 | Set 3 | Set 4 | Set 5 | Total | Report |
|---|---|---|---|---|---|---|---|---|---|---|---|
| 25 Sep | 15:00 | Turkey | 3–0 | France | 25–22 | 25–9 | 25–15 | | | 75–46 | Report |
| 25 Sep | 17:30 | Italy | 3–0 | Germany | 25–15 | 25–22 | 25–22 | | | 75–59 | Report |
| 26 Sep | 15:00 | Italy | 3–0 | Turkey | 25–20 | 25–16 | 25–14 | | | 75–50 | Report |
| 26 Sep | 17:30 | Germany | 3–1 | France | 25–19 | 25–17 | 19–25 | 28–26 | | 97–87 | Report |
| 27 Sep | 15:00 | France | 1–3 | Italy | 22–25 | 22–25 | 25–23 | 15–25 | | 84–98 | Report |
| 27 Sep | 17:30 | Germany | 3–2 | Turkey | 25–23 | 23–25 | 18–25 | 25–21 | 15–9 | 106–103 | Report |

=== Pool C ===
- venue: Łuczniczka, Bydgoszcz

| Pos | Team | Pld | W | L | Pts | SW | SL | SR | SPW | SPL | SPR | Qualification |
|---|---|---|---|---|---|---|---|---|---|---|---|---|
| 1 | Russia | 3 | 3 | 0 | 6 | 9 | 2 | 4.500 | 253 | 178 | 1.421 | Pool E |
| 2 | Bulgaria | 3 | 2 | 1 | 5 | 6 | 6 | 1.000 | 240 | 251 | 0.956 | Pool E |
| 3 | Belgium | 3 | 1 | 2 | 4 | 7 | 7 | 1.000 | 293 | 304 | 0.964 | Pool E |
| 4 | Belarus | 3 | 0 | 3 | 3 | 2 | 9 | 0.222 | 217 | 270 | 0.804 | |

| Date | Time | | Score | | Set 1 | Set 2 | Set 3 | Set 4 | Set 5 | Total | Report |
|---|---|---|---|---|---|---|---|---|---|---|---|
| 25 Sep | 17:30 | Belgium | 3–1 | Belarus | 26–28 | 25–20 | 27–25 | 25–22 | | 103–95 | Report |
| 25 Sep | 20:00 | Bulgaria | 0–3 | Russia | 19–25 | 9–25 | 14–25 | | | 42–75 | Report |
| 26 Sep | 17:30 | Bulgaria | 3–2 | Belgium | 24–26 | 25–22 | 17–25 | 25–21 | 15–6 | 106–100 | Report |
| 26 Sep | 20:00 | Russia | 3–0 | Belarus | 25–19 | 25–12 | 25–15 | | | 75–46 | Report |
| 27 Sep | 17:30 | Belarus | 1–3 | Bulgaria | 25–17 | 20–25 | 11–25 | 20–25 | | 76–92 | Report |
| 27 Sep | 20:00 | Russia | 3–2 | Belgium | 25–13 | 18–25 | 20–25 | 25–18 | 15–9 | 103–90 | Report |

=== Pool D ===
- venue: Spodek, Katowice

| Pos | Team | Pld | W | L | Pts | SW | SL | SR | SPW | SPL | SPR | Qualification |
|---|---|---|---|---|---|---|---|---|---|---|---|---|
| 1 | Serbia | 3 | 3 | 0 | 6 | 9 | 0 | MAX | 225 | 160 | 1.406 | Pool F |
| 2 | Azerbaijan | 3 | 1 | 2 | 4 | 5 | 8 | 0.625 | 264 | 272 | 0.971 | Pool F |
| 3 | Czech Republic | 3 | 1 | 2 | 4 | 5 | 8 | 0.625 | 269 | 282 | 0.954 | Pool F |
| 4 | Slovakia | 3 | 1 | 2 | 4 | 5 | 8 | 0.625 | 244 | 288 | 0.847 | |

| Date | Time | | Score | | Set 1 | Set 2 | Set 3 | Set 4 | Set 5 | Total | Report |
|---|---|---|---|---|---|---|---|---|---|---|---|
| 25 Sep | 15:00 | Azerbaijan | 0–3 | Serbia | 12–25 | 21–25 | 19–25 | | | 52–75 | Report |
| 25 Sep | 17:30 | Slovakia | 3–2 | Czech Republic | 25–21 | 17–25 | 19–25 | 25–23 | 15–13 | 101–107 | Report |
| 26 Sep | 15:00 | Slovakia | 2–3 | Azerbaijan | 13–25 | 25–19 | 18–25 | 25–22 | 12–15 | 93–106 | Report |
| 26 Sep | 17:30 | Czech Republic | 0–3 | Serbia | 19–25 | 21–25 | 18–25 | | | 58–75 | Report |
| 27 Sep | 15:00 | Serbia | 3–0 | Slovakia | 25–19 | 25–15 | 25–16 | | | 75–50 | Report |
| 27 Sep | 17:30 | Czech Republic | 3–2 | Azerbaijan | 21–25 | 18–25 | 25–23 | 25–20 | 15–13 | 104–106 | Report |

== Playoff round ==
- All times are Central European Summer Time (UTC+02:00).

=== Pool E ===
- venue: Arena Łódź, Łódź

| Pos | Team | Pld | W | L | Pts | SW | SL | SR | SPW | SPL | SPR | Qualification |
|---|---|---|---|---|---|---|---|---|---|---|---|---|
| 1 | Netherlands | 5 | 5 | 0 | 10 | 15 | 2 | 7.500 | 407 | 312 | 1.304 | Semifinals |
| 2 | Poland | 5 | 4 | 1 | 9 | 12 | 8 | 1.500 | 449 | 424 | 1.059 | Semifinals |
| 3 | Russia | 5 | 3 | 2 | 8 | 12 | 9 | 1.333 | 465 | 428 | 1.086 | |
| 4 | Bulgaria | 5 | 2 | 3 | 7 | 7 | 12 | 0.583 | 390 | 422 | 0.924 | |
| 5 | Spain | 5 | 1 | 4 | 6 | 7 | 14 | 0.500 | 419 | 478 | 0.877 | |
| 6 | Belgium | 5 | 0 | 5 | 5 | 7 | 15 | 0.467 | 423 | 489 | 0.865 | |

| Date | Time | | Score | | Set 1 | Set 2 | Set 3 | Set 4 | Set 5 | Total | Report |
|---|---|---|---|---|---|---|---|---|---|---|---|
| 29 Sep | 15:00 | Spain | 1–3 | Russia | 21–25 | 24–26 | 25–19 | 20–25 | | 90–95 | Report |
| 29 Sep | 17:30 | Netherlands | 3–0 | Bulgaria | 25–19 | 25–20 | 25–18 | | | 75–57 | Report |
| 29 Sep | 20:00 | Poland | 3–1 | Belgium | 25–16 | 21–25 | 25–19 | 25–12 | | 96–72 | Report |
| 30 Sep | 15:00 | Bulgaria | 3–1 | Spain | 25–20 | 25–16 | 21–25 | 25–18 | | 96–79 | Report |
| 30 Sep | 17:30 | Russia | 1–3 | Poland | 26–24 | 22–25 | 22–25 | 22–25 | | 92–99 | Report |
| 30 Sep | 20:00 | Belgium | 0–3 | Netherlands | 17–25 | 19–25 | 20–25 | | | 56–75 | Report |
| 01 Oct | 15:00 | Spain | 3–2 | Belgium | 23–25 | 25–19 | 21–25 | 25–23 | 15–13 | 109–105 | Report |
| 1 Oct | 17:30 | Netherlands | 3–2 | Russia | 25–19 | 19–25 | 23–25 | 25–19 | 15–12 | 107–100 | Report |
| 1 Oct | 20:00 | Poland | 3–1 | Bulgaria | 18–25 | 25–20 | 25–21 | 25–23 | | 93–89 | Report |

The following Preliminary round matches are also valid for the pool standings:

| Date | Time | | Score | | Set 1 | Set 2 | Set 3 | Set 4 | Set 5 | Total | Report |
|---|---|---|---|---|---|---|---|---|---|---|---|
| 25 Sep | 20:00 | Spain | 2–3 | Poland | 15–25 | 20–25 | 25–19 | 25–23 | 11–15 | 96–107 | Report |
| 25 Sep | 20:00 | Bulgaria | 0–3 | Russia | 19–25 | 9–25 | 14–25 | | | 42–75 | Report |
| 26 Sep | 17:30 | Bulgaria | 3–2 | Belgium | 24–26 | 25–22 | 17–25 | 25–21 | 15–6 | 106–100 | Report |
| 26 Sep | 20:00 | Spain | 0–3 | Netherlands | 17–25 | 13–25 | 15–25 | | | 45–75 | Report |
| 27 Sep | 17:00 | Poland | 0–3 | Netherlands | 18–25 | 13–25 | 23–25 | | | 54–75 | Report |
| 27 Sep | 20:00 | Russia | 3–2 | Belgium | 25–13 | 18–25 | 20–25 | 25–18 | 15–9 | 103–90 | Report |

=== Pool F ===
- venue: Spodek, Katowice

| Pos | Team | Pld | W | L | Pts | SW | SL | SR | SPW | SPL | SPR | Qualification |
|---|---|---|---|---|---|---|---|---|---|---|---|---|
| 1 | Italy | 5 | 5 | 0 | 10 | 15 | 0 | MAX | 379 | 290 | 1.307 | Semifinals |
| 2 | Germany | 5 | 4 | 1 | 9 | 12 | 7 | 1.714 | 431 | 359 | 1.201 | Semifinals |
| 3 | Turkey | 5 | 3 | 2 | 8 | 11 | 8 | 1.375 | 419 | 408 | 1.027 | |
| 4 | Serbia | 5 | 2 | 3 | 7 | 9 | 9 | 1.000 | 379 | 397 | 0.955 | |
| 5 | Czech Republic | 5 | 1 | 4 | 6 | 3 | 14 | 0.214 | 333 | 409 | 0.814 | |
| 6 | Azerbaijan | 5 | 0 | 5 | 5 | 3 | 15 | 0.200 | 347 | 425 | 0.816 | |

| Date | Time | | Score | | Set 1 | Set 2 | Set 3 | Set 4 | Set 5 | Total | Report |
|---|---|---|---|---|---|---|---|---|---|---|---|
| 29 Sep | 15:00 | Italy | 3–0 | Azerbaijan | 29–27 | 25–23 | 25–13 | | | 79–63 | Report |
| 29 Sep | 17:30 | Germany | 3–0 | Czech Republic | 28–26 | 25–12 | 25–15 | | | 78–53 | Report |
| 29 Sep | 20:00 | Turkey | 3–1 | Serbia | 24–26 | 25–16 | 25–23 | 25–19 | | 99–84 | Report |
| 30 Sep | 15:00 | Czech Republic | 0–3 | Italy | 16–25 | 20–25 | 23–25 | | | 59–75 | Report |
| 30 Sep | 17:30 | Serbia | 2–3 | Germany | 9–25 | 25–23 | 27–25 | 17–25 | 8–15 | 86–113 | Report |
| 30 Sep | 20:00 | Azerbaijan | 1–3 | Turkey | 23–25 | 19–25 | 25–17 | 17–25 | | 84–92 | Report |
| 01 Oct | 15:00 | Italy | 3–0 | Serbia | 25–19 | 25–18 | 25–22 | | | 75–59 | Report |
| 01 Oct | 17:30 | Germany | 3–0 | Azerbaijan | 25–17 | 25–13 | 25–12 | | | 75–42 | Report |
| 01 Oct | 20:00 | Turkey | 3–0 | Czech Republic | 25–16 | 25–20 | 25–23 | | | 75–59 | Report |

The following Preliminary round matches are also valid for the pool standings:

| Date | Time | | Score | | Set 1 | Set 2 | Set 3 | Set 4 | Set 5 | Total | Report |
|---|---|---|---|---|---|---|---|---|---|---|---|
| 25 Sep | 15:00 | Azerbaijan | 0–3 | Serbia | 12–25 | 21–25 | 19–25 | | | 52–75 | Report |
| 25 Sep | 17:30 | Italy | 3–0 | Germany | 25–15 | 25–22 | 25–22 | | | 75–59 | Report |
| 26 Sep | 15:00 | Italy | 3–0 | Turkey | 25–20 | 25–16 | 25–14 | | | 75–50 | Report |
| 26 Sep | 17:30 | Czech Republic | 0–3 | Serbia | 19–25 | 21–25 | 18–25 | | | 58–75 | Report |
| 27 Sep | 17:30 | Germany | 3–2 | Turkey | 25–23 | 23–25 | 18–25 | 25–21 | 15–9 | 106–103 | Report |
| 27 Sep | 17:30 | Czech Republic | 3–2 | Azerbaijan | 21–25 | 18–25 | 25–23 | 25–20 | 15–13 | 104–106 | Report |

== Final round ==
- venue: Arena Łódź, Łódź
- All times are Central European Summer Time (UTC+02:00).

A drawing of lots determined, which group-winner plays which runner-up in the semifinals.

Semifinals
3 Oct
Netherlands | 3
Poland | 1
3 Oct
Italy | 3
Germany | 1

Final
4 Oct
Netherlands | 0
Italy | 3
3rd place
4 Oct
Poland | 3
Germany | 0

=== Semifinals ===
| Date | Time | | Score | | Set 1 | Set 2 | Set 3 | Set 4 | Set 5 | Total | Report |
|---|---|---|---|---|---|---|---|---|---|---|---|
| 3 Oct | 17:00 | Netherlands | 3–1 | Poland | 25–11 | 25–15 | 20–25 | 25–20 | | 95–71 | Report |
| 3 Oct | 20:00 | Italy | 3–1 | Germany | 25–10 | 22–25 | 25–12 | 25–22 | | 97–69 | Report |

=== Bronze medal match ===
| Date | Time | | Score | | Set 1 | Set 2 | Set 3 | Set 4 | Set 5 | Total | Report |
|---|---|---|---|---|---|---|---|---|---|---|---|
| 4 Oct | 17:00 | Poland | 3–0 | Germany | 25–16 | 25–19 | 25–23 | | | 75–58 | Report |

=== Final ===
| Date | Time | | Score | | Set 1 | Set 2 | Set 3 | Set 4 | Set 5 | Total | Report |
|---|---|---|---|---|---|---|---|---|---|---|---|
| 4 Oct | 20:00 | Netherlands | 0–3 | Italy | 16–25 | 19–25 | 20–25 | | | 55–75 | Report |

== Final standing ==
| Place | Team |
|---|---|
| 1st place, gold medalist(s) | Italy |
| 2nd place, silver medalist(s) | Netherlands |
| 3rd place, bronze medalist(s) | Poland |
| 4 | Germany |
| 5 | Turkey |
| 6 | Russia |
| 7 | Serbia |
| 8 | Bulgaria |
| 9 | Spain |
| 10 | Czech Republic |
| 11 | Belgium |
| 12 | Azerbaijan |
| 13 | Slovakia |
| 14 | Belarus |
| 14 | France |
| 16 | Croatia |

2009 Women's European champions

Italy
Second title

Team Roster:
Giulia Rondon · Enrica Merlo · Jenny Barazza · Manuela Secolo · Paola Cardullo · Serena Ortolani · Francesca Piccinini · Valentina Arrighetti · Eleonora Lo Bianco · Antonella Del Core · Lucia Bosetti · Simona Gioli · Taismary Agüero · Lucia Crisanti
Head coach: Massimo Barbolini

== Individual awards ==
- MVP: Manon Flier (NED)
- Best scorer: Margareta Kozuch (GER)
- Best spiker: Simona Gioli (ITA)
- Best blocker: Christiane Fürst (GER)
- Best server: Agnieszka Bednarek-Kasza (POL)
- Best setter: Eleonora Lo Bianco (ITA)
- Best receiver: Kerstin Tzscherlich (GER)
- Best libero: Paola Cardullo (ITA)
