= Belarus women's national volleyball team =

Women's national volleyball team representing Belarus

Belarus
- Association: Volleyball Federation of the Republic of Belarus
- Confederation: CEV
- Head coach: Piotr Khilko
- FIVB ranking: NR (24 May 2026)

Uniforms
Home

European Championship
- Appearances: 10 (First in 1993)
- Best result: 7th (2017)

The Belarus women's national volleyball team represented Belarus in international women's volleyball competitions and friendly matches. After the dissolution of the Soviet Union the team first competed on the highest level under its own flag at the 1993 European Championship, finishing in eighth place.

In light of the 2022 Russian invasion of Ukraine, the European Volleyball Confederation (CEV) banned all Belarusian national teams, clubs, and officials from participating in European competition, and suspended all members of Belarus from their respective functions in CEV organs.

== European Championship record ==
- 1993 — 8th place
- 1995 — 8th place
- 1997 — 9th place
- 2007 — 16th place
- 2009 — 14th place
- 2013 — 12th place
- 2015 — 9th place
- 2017 — 7th place
- 2019 — 22nd place
- 2021 — 14th place

== See also ==
- Belarus women's national under-21 volleyball team
- Belarus women's national under-19 volleyball team
