= 2007 Women's European Volleyball Championship =

Tournament details
- Host countries: Belgium; Luxembourg
- Dates: 20 – 30 September
- Teams: 16
- Venue: 3 (in 3 host cities)

Final positions
- Champions: Italy (1st title)

Tournament awards
- MVP: (Italy) Taismary Agüero

The 2007 Women's European Volleyball Championship was the 25th edition of the event, organised by Europe's governing volleyball body, the Confédération Européenne de Volleyball. It was hosted in Charleroi and Hasselt of Belgium and Luxembourg City of Luxembourg from 20 to 30 September 2007.

== Participating teams ==
Team	Method of qualification
Azerbaijan	2005 edition fourth place
Belarus	Qualification play-offs
Belgium	Hosts
Bulgaria	Qualification group D winners
Croatia	Qualification group F winners
Czech Republic	Qualification group B winners
France	Qualification play-offs
Germany	Qualification group C winners
Italy	2005 edition second place
Netherlands	2005 edition fifth place
Poland	2005 edition first place
Russia	2005 edition third place
Serbia (Note: Started the qualification campaign as Serbia and Montenegro.)	Qualification group E winners
Slovakia	Qualification play-offs
Spain	Qualification group A winners
Turkey	2005 edition sixth place

== Format ==
The tournament was played in three different stages. In the first stage, the sixteen participants were divided in four groups (A, B, C and D) of four teams each. A single round-robin format was played within each group to determine the teams' group position; the three best teams of each group (total of 12 teams) progressed to the second stage.

The second stage of the tournament consisted of two groups of six teams each. As the first stage match results amongst the teams which advanced to this stage also counted, the two groups had been predetermined, one group formed by groups A and C teams while the other was formed by groups B and D teams. In each of the two groups, the teams played once against every opponent they had not faced in the tournament (total of three matches each), adding that to the results obtained against the other two teams who also advanced from the first stage same group. The two group winners and two runners-up from this second stage advanced to the third stage.

The third and final stage of the tournament was composed of the semifinals, third place match and final. Each of the semifinals was played between the winner and the runner-up of the same second stage group.

== Pools composition ==
Pool A	Pool B	Pool C	Pool D
Azerbaijan	Bulgaria	Croatia	Belgium
Belarus	Czech Republic	France	Netherlands
Germany	Poland	Russia	Serbia
Italy	Spain	Turkey	Slovakia

== Venues ==
The tournament was played at three venues in three cities, of which two were in Belgium and one in Luxembourg. Group stages were held in Belgium and Luxembourg hosted the final round.

Host cities in Belgium		Host cities in Luxembourg
Pools A, C and E	Pools B, D and F	Final round
Charleroi, Belgium	Hasselt, Belgium	Luxembourg City, Luxembourg
Spiroudome	Sporthal Alverberg	d'Coque
Capacity: 6,300	Capacity: 1,700	Capacity: 8,300

== Preliminary round ==
- All times are Central European Summer Time (UTC+02:00).

=== Pool A ===
- venue: Spiroudome, Charleroi, Belgium

Pos	Team	Pld	W	L	Pts	SW	SL	SR	SPW	SPL	SPR	Qualification
1	Italy	3	3	0	6	9	1	9.000	249	193	1.290	Pool E
2	Germany	3	2	1	5	6	4	1.500	236	202	1.168	Pool E
3	Azerbaijan	3	1	2	4	3	6	0.500	179	201	0.891	Pool E
4	Belarus	3	0	3	3	2	9	0.222	202	270	0.748	

Date	Time		Score		Set 1	Set 2	Set 3	Set 4	Set 5	Total	Report
20 Sep	15:00	Azerbaijan	3–0	Belarus	25–15	25–23	25–13			75–51	Report
20 Sep	20:00	Germany	0–3	Italy	22–25	12–25	27–29			61–79	Report
21 Sep	17:30	Germany	3–0	Azerbaijan	25–13	25–22	25–16			75–51	Report
22 Sep	15:00	Belarus	1–3	Germany	10–25	18–25	27–25	17–25		72–100	Report
22 Sep	20:00	Italy	3–0	Azerbaijan	25–23	25–14	25–16			75–53	Report
23 Sep	17:30	Belarus	1–3	Italy	16–25	22–25	25–20	16–25		79–95	Report

=== Pool B ===
- venue: Sporthal Alverberg, Hasselt, Belgium

Pos	Team	Pld	W	L	Pts	SW	SL	SR	SPW	SPL	SPR	Qualification
1	Poland	3	3	0	6	9	3	3.000	286	259	1.104	Pool F
2	Czech Republic	3	2	1	5	7	5	1.400	279	258	1.081	Pool F
3	Bulgaria	3	1	2	4	7	8	0.875	321	342	0.939	Pool F
4	Spain	3	0	3	3	2	9	0.222	237	264	0.898	

Date	Time		Score		Set 1	Set 2	Set 3	Set 4	Set 5	Total	Report
20 Sep	17:30	Spain	2–3	Bulgaria	28–26	25–15	31–33	14–25	13–15	111–114	Report
21 Sep	15:00	Bulgaria	2–3	Czech Republic	10–25	25–22	22–25	25–23	18–20	100–115	Report
21 Sep	20:00	Poland	3–0	Spain	25–21	25–22	25–20			75–63	Report
22 Sep	17:30	Czech Republic	1–3	Poland	17–25	25–27	25–18	22–25		89–95	Report
23 Sep	15:00	Czech Republic	3–0	Spain	25–19	25–23	25–21			75–63	Report
23 Sep	17:30	Bulgaria	2–3	Poland	25–20	25–27	31–29	13–25	13–15	107–116	Report

=== Pool C ===
- venue: Spiroudome, Charleroi, Belgium

Pos	Team	Pld	W	L	Pts	SW	SL	SR	SPW	SPL	SPR	Qualification
1	Russia	3	3	0	6	9	0	MAX	228	185	1.232	Pool E
2	France	3	2	1	5	6	4	1.500	231	223	1.036	Pool E
3	Turkey	3	1	2	4	3	8	0.375	236	251	0.940	Pool E
4	Croatia	3	0	3	3	3	9	0.333	248	284	0.873	

Date	Time		Score		Set 1	Set 2	Set 3	Set 4	Set 5	Total	Report
20 Sep	17:30	Russia	3–0	Croatia	25–23	25–23	25–14			75–60	Report
21 Sep	15:00	Croatia	1–3	France	21–25	26–28	25–22	18–25		90–100	Report
21 Sep	20:00	Turkey	0–3	Russia	21–25	26–28	22–25			69–78	Report
22 Sep	17:30	France	3–0	Turkey	25–19	25–16	25–23			75–58	Report
23 Sep	15:00	France	0–3	Russia	19–25	17–25	20–25			56–75	Report
23 Sep	20:00	Croatia	2–3	Turkey	25–22	25–22	22–25	20–25	6–15	98–109	Report

=== Pool D ===
- venue: Sporthal Alverberg, Hasselt, Belgium

Pos	Team	Pld	W	L	Pts	SW	SL	SR	SPW	SPL	SPR	Qualification
1	Netherlands	3	2	1	5	8	4	2.000	270	235	1.149	Pool F
2	Serbia	3	2	1	5	8	7	1.143	328	298	1.101	Pool F
3	Belgium	3	1	2	4	6	6	1.000	251	259	0.969	Pool F
4	Slovakia	3	1	2	4	3	8	0.375	196	253	0.775	

Date	Time		Score		Set 1	Set 2	Set 3	Set 4	Set 5	Total	Report
20 Sep	15:00	Slovakia	3–2	Serbia	14–25	25–21	25–20	21–25	15–11	100–102	Report
20 Sep	20:30	Netherlands	3–1	Belgium	25–19	18–25	25–23	25–12		93–79	Report
21 Sep	17:30	Netherlands	3–0	Slovakia	25–16	25–12	25–16			75–44	Report
22 Sep	15:00	Serbia	3–2	Netherlands	25–18	17–25	25–14	30–32	15–13	112–102	Report
22 Sep	20:00	Belgium	3–0	Slovakia	25–14	25–14	26–24			76–52	Report
23 Sep	20:00	Serbia	3–2	Belgium	22–25	25–20	27–29	25–17	15–5	114–96	Report

== Playoff round ==
- All times are Central European Summer Time (UTC+02:00).

=== Pool E ===
- venue: Spiroudome, Charleroi, Belgium

Pos	Team	Pld	W	L	Pts	SW	SL	SR	SPW	SPL	SPR	Qualification
1	Italy	5	5	0	10	15	1	15.000	403	301	1.339	Semifinals
2	Russia	5	4	1	9	12	3	4.000	359	312	1.151	Semifinals
3	Germany	5	3	2	8	9	6	1.500	351	327	1.073	
4	France	5	2	3	7	7	10	0.700	351	384	0.914	
5	Turkey	5	1	4	6	3	12	0.250	333	369	0.902	
6	Azerbaijan	5	0	5	5	1	15	0.067	294	398	0.739	

Date	Time		Score		Set 1	Set 2	Set 3	Set 4	Set 5	Total	Report
25 Sep	15:00	Italy	3–1	France	24–26	25–17	25–10	25–19		99–72	Report
25 Sep	17:30	Germany	3–0	Turkey	25–21	25–21	32–30			82–72	Report
25 Sep	20:00	Azerbaijan	0–3	Russia	23–25	14–25	17–25			54–75	Report
26 Sep	15:00	Italy	3–0	Turkey	25–23	25–14	25–22			75–59	Report
26 Sep	17:30	Germany	0–3	Russia	12–25	23–25	23–25			58–75	Report
26 Sep	20:00	Azerbaijan	1–3	France	14–25	25–23	17–25	21–25		77–98	Report
27 Sep	15:00	Italy	3–0	Russia	25–15	25–22	25–19			75–56	Report
27 Sep	17:30	Germany	3–0	France	25–22	25–13	25–15			75–50	Report
27 Sep	20:00	Azerbaijan	0–3	Turkey	18–25	19–25	22–25			59–75	Report

The following Preliminary round matches are also valid for the pool standings:

Date	Time		Score		Set 1	Set 2	Set 3	Set 4	Set 5	Total	Report
20 Sep	20:00	Germany	0–3	Italy	22–25	12–25	27–29			61–79	Report
21 Sep	17:30	Germany	3–0	Azerbaijan	25–13	25–22	25–16			75–51	Report
21 Sep	20:00	Turkey	0–3	Russia	21–25	26–28	22–25			69–78	Report
22 Sep	20:00	Italy	3–0	Azerbaijan	25–23	25–14	25–16			75–53	Report
22 Sep	17:30	France	3–0	Turkey	25–19	25–16	25–23			75–58	Report
23 Sep	15:00	France	0–3	Russia	19–25	17–25	20–25			56–75	Report

=== Pool F ===
- venue: Sporthal Alverberg, Hasselt, Belgium

Pos	Team	Pld	W	L	Pts	SW	SL	SR	SPW	SPL	SPR	Qualification
1	Poland	5	5	0	10	15	4	3.750	458	391	1.171	Semifinals
2	Serbia	5	4	1	9	12	8	1.500	453	417	1.086	Semifinals
3	Netherlands	5	3	2	8	12	7	1.714	431	407	1.059	
4	Belgium	5	2	3	7	9	11	0.818	430	450	0.956	
5	Czech Republic	5	1	4	6	5	14	0.357	396	438	0.904	
6	Bulgaria	5	0	5	5	6	15	0.400	446	511	0.873	

Date	Time		Score		Set 1	Set 2	Set 3	Set 4	Set 5	Total	Report
25 Sep	15:00	Bulgaria	0–3	Netherlands	20–25	23–25	19–25			62–75	Report
25 Sep	17:30	Poland	3–0	Serbia	25–18	25–20	25–14			75–52	Report
25 Sep	20:00	Czech Republic	1–3	Belgium	16–25	25–18	17–25	21–25		79–93	Report
26 Sep	15:00	Bulgaria	1–3	Serbia	25–20	16–25	19–25	28–30		88–100	Report
26 Sep	17:30	Czech Republic	0–3	Netherlands	18–25	17–25	22–25			57–75	Report
26 Sep	20:00	Poland	3–0	Belgium	25–18	25–20	25–19			75–57	Report
27 Sep	15:00	Czech Republic	0–3	Serbia	18–25	21–25	17–25			56–75	Report
27 Sep	17:30	Poland	3–1	Netherlands	25–22	25–18	22–25	25–21		97–86	Report
27 Sep	20:00	Bulgaria	1–3	Belgium	16–25	19–25	32–30	22–25		89–105	Report

The following Preliminary round matches are also valid for the pool standings:

Date	Time		Score		Set 1	Set 2	Set 3	Set 4	Set 5	Total	Report
20 Sep	20:30	Netherlands	3–1	Belgium	25–19	18–25	25–23	25–12		93–79	Report
21 Sep	15:00	Bulgaria	2–3	Czech Republic	10–25	25–22	22–25	25–23	18–20	100–115	Report
22 Sep	15:00	Serbia	3–2	Netherlands	25–18	17–25	25–14	30–32	15–13	112–102	Report
22 Sep	17:30	Czech Republic	1–3	Poland	17–25	25–27	25–18	22–25		89–95	Report
23 Sep	17:30	Bulgaria	2–3	Poland	25–20	25–27	31–29	13–25	13–15	107–116	Report
23 Sep	20:00	Serbia	3–2	Belgium	22–25	25–20	27–29	25–17	15–5	114–96	Report

== Final round ==
- venue: d'Coque, Luxembourg City, Luxembourg
- All times are Central European Summer Time (UTC+02:00).

Semifinals
29 Sep
Italy	3
Russia	0
29 Sep
Serbia	3
Poland	0

Final
30 Sep
Italy	3
Serbia	0
3rd place
30 Sep
Russia	3
Poland	1

=== Semifinals ===
Date	Time		Score		Set 1	Set 2	Set 3	Set 4	Set 5	Total	Report
29 Sep	16:30	Italy	3–0	Russia	25–21	25–22	25–13			75–56	Report
29 Sep	19:30	Serbia	3–0	Poland	27–25	25–21	25–21			77–67	Report

=== 3rd place match ===
Date	Time		Score		Set 1	Set 2	Set 3	Set 4	Set 5	Total	Report
30 Sep	15:30	Russia	3–1	Poland	21–25	25–22	25–14	25–20		96–81	Report

=== Final ===
Date	Time		Score		Set 1	Set 2	Set 3	Set 4	Set 5	Total	Report
30 Sep	18:30	Italy	3–0	Serbia	26–24	25–18	25–21			76–63	Report

== Ranking and statistics ==
=== Final ranking ===
Place	Team
1st place, gold medalist(s)	Italy
2nd place, silver medalist(s)	Serbia
3rd place, bronze medalist(s)	Russia
4	Poland
5	Netherlands
6	Germany
7	Belgium
8	France
9	Czech Republic
10	Turkey
11	Bulgaria
12	Azerbaijan
13	Slovakia
14	Croatia
15	Spain
16	Belarus

2007 Women's European champions

Italy
First title

Team Roster:
Simona Gioli, Paola Croce, Valentina Fiorin, Martina Guiggi, Jenny Barazza, Manuela Secolo, Taismary Agüero, Francesca Ferretti, Eleonora Lo Bianco, Antonella Del Core and Paola Cardullo.
Head coach: Massimo Barbolini.

=== Individual awards ===
- MVP: Taismary Agüero (ITA)
- Best scorer: Ekaterina Gamova (RUS)
- Best spiker: Małgorzata Glinka (POL)
- Best blocker: Jenny Barazza (ITA)
- Best server: Jovana Brakočević (SRB)
- Best libero: Paola Cardullo (ITA)
- Best setter: Maja Ognjenović (SRB)
- Best receiver: Liubov Shashkova (RUS)
