= 2017 Women's European Volleyball League =

European volleyball tournament

2017 Women's European League
- Dates: 9 June – 2 July
- Teams: 12

Final positions
- Champions: Ukraine (1st title)
- Runners-up: Finland

Tournament awards
- MVP: (Ukraine) Anna Stepaniuk

The 2017 Women's European Volleyball League was the ninth edition of the annual Women's European Volleyball League, which features women's national volleyball teams from twelve European countries.

In their first appearance in the competition, Ukraine won the title after defeating Finland in the final.

== Teams ==
Pool A	Pool B	Pool C
Albania	France	Spain
Austria	Georgia	Portugal
Belarus	Montenegro	Slovakia
Finland	Ukraine	Sweden

== League round ==
- All times are local.

=== Pool A ===
Pos	Team	Pld	W	L	Pts	SW	SL	SR	SPW	SPL	SPR	Qualification
1	Finland	6	6	0	18	18	0	MAX	452	358	1.263	Final Four
2	Belarus	6	3	3	9	10	9	1.111	438	389	1.126	
3	Albania	6	2	4	6	7	14	0.500	449	496	0.905	
4	Austria	6	1	5	3	4	16	0.250	379	475	0.798	

==== Week 1 ====
- Venue: Tirana Olympic Park, Tirana, Albania

Date	Time		Score		Set 1	Set 2	Set 3	Set 4	Set 5	Total	Report
9 Jun	15:00	Austria	0–3	Belarus	12–25	13–25	22–25			47–75	
9 Jun	18:00	Albania	0–3	Finland	15–25	20–25	22–25			57–75	Report
10 Jun	15:00	Belarus	0–3	Finland	20–25	15–25	15–25			50–75	Report
10 Jun	18:00	Austria	1–3	Albania	18–25	25–20	19–25	22–25		84–95	Report
11 Jun	15:00	Finland	3–0	Austria	25–17	25–19	25–20			75–56	Report
11 Jun	18:00	Belarus	1–3	Albania	25–22	22–25	24–26	23–25		94–98	Report

==== Week 2 ====
- Venue: Chizhovka-Arena, Minsk, Belarus

Date	Time		Score		Set 1	Set 2	Set 3	Set 4	Set 5	Total	Report
16 Jun	15:30	Albania	0–3	Finland	19–25	23–25	20–25			62–75	Report
16 Jun	18:00	Belarus	3–0	Austria	25–8	25–7	25–20			75–35	Report
17 Jun	15:30	Finland	3–0	Austria	25–23	25–22	25–19			75–64	Report
17 Jun	18:00	Albania	0–3	Belarus	22–25	12–25	23–25			57–75	Report
18 Jun	15:30	Austria	3–1	Albania	25–16	25–16	18–25	25–23		93–80	Report
18 Jun	18:00	Finland	3–0	Belarus	25–21	25–23	27–25			77–69	Report

=== Pool B ===
Pos	Team	Pld	W	L	Pts	SW	SL	SR	SPW	SPL	SPR	Qualification
1	Ukraine	6	6	0	18	18	1	18.000	468	307	1.524	Final Four
2	France	6	4	2	12	13	8	1.625	473	460	1.028	
3	Montenegro	6	2	4	6	8	13	0.615	439	488	0.900	
4	Georgia	6	0	6	0	1	18	0.056	343	468	0.733	

==== Week 1 ====
- Venue: (Georgia (country)) Tbilisi Sports Palace, Tbilisi, Georgia

Date	Time		Score		Set 1	Set 2	Set 3	Set 4	Set 5	Total	Report
16 Jun	16:00	Montenegro	0–3	Ukraine	17–25	20–25	14–25			51–75	Report
16 Jun	18:30	Georgia	0–3	France	20–25	11–25	21–25			52–75	Report
17 Jun	16:00	Ukraine	3–0	France	25–23	25–14	25–17			75–54	Report
17 Jun	18:30	Montenegro	3–1	Georgia	18–25	25–21	25–16	25–18		93–80	Report
18 Jun	16:00	France	3–1	Montenegro	28–26	25–17	24–26	25–18		102–87	Report
18 Jun	18:30	Ukraine	3–0	Georgia	25–12	25–21	25–20			75–53	Report

==== Week 2 ====
- Venue: Salle Sportive Métropolitaine, Rezé, France

Date	Time		Score		Set 1	Set 2	Set 3	Set 4	Set 5	Total	Report
23 Jun	16:00	Montenegro	0–3	Ukraine	11–25	12–25	15–25			38–75	Report
23 Jun	20:00	France	3–0	Georgia	25–21	25–20	25–17			75–58	Report
24 Jun	16:00	Ukraine	3–0	Georgia	25–16	25–15	25–14			75–45	Report
24 Jun	19:00	Montenegro	1–3	France	21–25	27–25	23–25	24–26		95–101	Report
25 Jun	16:00	Georgia	0–3	Montenegro	18–25	20–25	17–25			55–75	
25 Jun	19:00	Ukraine	3–1	France	25–13	18–25	25–14	25–14		93–66	Report

=== Pool C ===
Pos	Team	Pld	W	L	Pts	SW	SL	SR	SPW	SPL	SPR	Qualification
1	Spain	6	5	1	16	17	5	3.400	528	444	1.189	Final Four
2	Slovakia	6	4	2	12	12	7	1.714	439	385	1.140	Final Four
3	Portugal	6	2	4	6	8	13	0.615	466	494	0.943	
4	Sweden	6	1	5	2	5	17	0.294	421	531	0.793	

==== Week 1 ====
- Venue: Polideportivo Huerta del Rey, Valladolid, Spain

Date	Time		Score		Set 1	Set 2	Set 3	Set 4	Set 5	Total	Report
9 Jun	17:00	Portugal	0–3	Slovakia	18–25	20–25	20–25			58–75	Report
9 Jun	20:00	Spain	3–1	Sweden	25–17	25–13	22–25	25–19		97–74	Report
10 Jun	17:00	Slovakia	3–0	Sweden	25–15	25–11	25–18			75–44	Report
10 Jun	20:00	Portugal	1–3	Spain	25–19	22–25	23–25	25–27		95–96	Report
11 Jun	17:00	Sweden	1–3	Portugal	16–25	25–19	21–25	23–25		85–94	Report
11 Jun	20:00	Slovakia	0–3	Spain	20–25	19–25	24–26			63–76	Report

==== Week 2 ====
- Venue: Centro de Desportos e Congressos, Matosinhos, Portugal

Date	Time		Score		Set 1	Set 2	Set 3	Set 4	Set 5	Total	Report
16 Jun	16:00	Slovakia	0–3	Spain	21–25	13–25	23–25			57–75	Report
16 Jun	19:00	Portugal	3–0	Sweden	25–17	31–29	25–23			81–69	Report
17 Jun	15:00	Spain	2–3	Sweden	25–15	24–26	25–21	22–25	13–15	109–102	Report
17 Jun	18:00	Slovakia	3–1	Portugal	25–21	19–25	25–19	25–20		94–85	Report
18 Jun	15:00	Sweden	0–3	Slovakia	12–25	16–25	19–25			47–75	Report
18 Jun	18:00	Spain	3–0	Portugal	25–13	25–20	25–20			75–53	Report

== Final four ==
The top placed team from each group and the best second-placed team will qualify for the final four.

Qualified teams

- Finland
- Ukraine
- Spain
- Slovakia

=== Bracket ===
- All times are local

Semifinal
A1	Finland	3	3	5
C2	Slovakia	2	0	1
C1	Spain	1	3	2
B1	Ukraine	3	2	4

Final
A1	Finland	1	1	0
B1	Ukraine	3	3	6

=== Semifinal ===
Leg 1

Date	Time		Score		Set 1	Set 2	Set 3	Set 4	Set 5	Total	Report
28 Jun	18:00	Slovakia	2–3	Finland	23–25	25–15	25–20	17–25	12–15	102–100	Report
28 Jun	19:00	Ukraine	3–1	Spain	25–19	25–21	24–26	25–21		99–87	Report

Leg 2

Date	Time		Score		Set 1	Set 2	Set 3	Set 4	Set 5	Total	Report
2 Jul	17:00	Finland	3–0	Slovakia	25–16	25–18	25–21			75–55	Report
2 Jul	20:00	Spain	3–2	Ukraine	22–25	25–23	23–25	25–20	15–5	110–98	Report

=== Final ===
Date	Time		Score		Set 1	Set 2	Set 3	Set 4	Set 5	Total	Report
5 Jul	18:30	Finland	1–3	Ukraine	20–25	27–29	25–22	11–25		83–101	Report
9 Jul	19:00	Ukraine	3–1	Finland	17–25	25–23	27–25	25–16		94–89	Report

== Final standings ==
Rank	Team
1st place, gold medalist(s)	Ukraine
2nd place, silver medalist(s)	Finland
3rd place, bronze medalist(s)	Slovakia
3rd place, bronze medalist(s)	Spain
5	France
6	Belarus
7	Portugal
8	Montenegro
9	Albania
10	Austria
11	Sweden
12	Georgia

2017 Women's European League champions

Ukraine
1st title

14-woman roster for Final Round
Degtiarova, Trushkina, Denysova, Chernukha, Gerasymova, Stepaniuk, Stepanchuk, Novgorodchenko, Niemtseva, Yatskiv, Kodola, Dorsman, Karpets
Head coach
Gariy Yegiazarov

== Awards ==
- MVP: (Ukraine) Anna Stepaniuk

== See also ==
- 2017 Men's European Volleyball League
