= Women's European Volleyball League =

Volleyball League in Europe

- Most recent season or competition: 2026 Women's European Volleyball League
- Sport: Volleyball
- Founded: 2009; 17 years ago
- First season: 2009
- Continent: Europe (CEV)
- Most recent champions: Sweden (2nd title)
- Most titles: Serbia; Ukraine (3 titles each)

The Women's European Volleyball League is a continental volleyball competition for senior women's national volleyball teams of Europe, organized by the European Volleyball Confederation (CEV). Created in 2009, the competition served as a qualifying tournament for the FIVB World Grand Prix (until 2016) and its successor the FIVB Challenger Cup from 2018 to 2024.

This event should not be confused with the other, more prestigious, continental competition for European national volleyball teams, the European Volleyball Championship.

== Results summary ==
Year	Finals hosts	Final			Third place match (or losing semi-finalists)			Teams
Year	Finals hosts	Champions	Score	Runners-up	3rd Place	Score	4th Place	Teams
2009; Details	(Turkey); Kayseri	Serbia	3–2	Turkey	Bulgaria	3–0	France	8
2010; Details	(Turkey); Ankara	Serbia	3–1	Bulgaria	Turkey	3–0	Israel	8
2011; Details	(Turkey); Istanbul	Serbia	3–0	Turkey	Bulgaria	3–0	Czech Republic	12
2012; Details	(Czech Republic); Karlovy Vary	Czech Republic	3–0	Bulgaria	Serbia	3–1	Netherlands	12
2013; Details	(Bulgaria); Varna	Germany	3–2	Belgium	Bulgaria	3–0	Romania	8
2014; Details	(Germany) Rüsselsheim am Main (Turkey) Bursa	Turkey	6–0 (agg.) (3–1, 3–1)	Germany	Azerbaijan and Poland			8
2015; Details	(Hungary) Érd (Turkey) İzmir	Hungary	3–3 (agg.) (3–0, 1–3) (15–13 g.s.)	Turkey	Greece and Israel			6
2016; Details	(Azerbaijan) Baku (Slovakia) Nitra	Azerbaijan	6–0 (agg.) (3–1, 3–0)	Slovakia	Greece and Slovenia			12
2017; Details	(Finland) Helsinki (Ukraine) Ivano-Frankivsk	Ukraine	6–0 (agg.) (3–1, 3–1)	Finland	Slovakia and Spain			12
2018; Details	(Hungary); Budapest	Bulgaria	3–0	Hungary	Czech Republic	3–1	Finland	20
2019; Details	(Croatia); Varaždin	Czech Republic	3–1	Croatia	Belarus	3–0	Spain	20
2020; Details	None	Cancelled due to COVID-19 pandemic						18
2021; Details	(Bulgaria); Ruse	Bulgaria	3–1	Croatia	Spain	3–2	Czech Republic	19
2022; Details	(France); Orléans	France	3–0	Czech Republic	Croatia and Romania			14
2023; Details	(Romania) Piatra Neamt (Sweden) Lund	Ukraine	6–0 (agg.) (3–0, 3–0)	Sweden	Belgium and Czech Republic			17
2024; Details	(Czech Republic); Ostrava	Sweden	3–2	Czech Republic	Belgium	3–0	Romania	22
2025; Details	(Sweden); Ängelholm	Ukraine	3–1	Hungary	Romania	3–2	Sweden	21
2026; Details	(Slovenia) Ljubljana (Sweden) Örebro	Sweden	2–0 (agg.) (3–2, 3–2)	Slovenia	Hungary	(Note: Since there are no Final six round, no third place match will be played and the losers of the semifinals will be ranked third and fourth based on their results from the semifinals.)	Slovakia	26

== Medal summary ==
Rank	Nation	Gold	Silver	Bronze	Total
1	Serbia	3	0	1	4
2	Ukraine	3	0	0	3
3	Bulgaria	2	2	3	7
4	Czech Republic	2	2	2	6
5	Sweden	2	1	0	3
6	Turkey	1	3	1	5
7	Hungary	1	2	1	4
8	Germany	1	1	0	2
9	Azerbaijan	1	0	1	2
10	France	1	0	0	1
11	Croatia	0	2	1	3
12	Belgium	0	1	2	3
13	Slovakia	0	1	1	2
13	Slovenia	0	1	1	2
15	Finland	0	1	0	1
16	Greece	0	0	2	2
16	Romania	0	0	2	2
16	Spain	0	0	2	2
19	Belarus	0	0	1	1
19	Israel	0	0	1	1
19	Poland	0	0	1	1
Totals (21 entries)		17	17	23	57

== MVP by edition ==
- 2009 – (Turkey) Neslihan Demir
- 2010 – (Serbia) Jelena Nikolić
- 2011 – (Serbia) Jovana Brakočević
- 2012 – (Czech Republic) Aneta Havlíčková
- 2013 – (Belgium) Charlotte Leys
- 2014 – (Turkey) Kübra Akman
- 2015 – (Hungary) Renáta Sándor
- 2016 – (Azerbaijan) Polina Rahimova
- 2017 – (Ukraine) Anna Stepaniuk
- 2018 – (Bulgaria) Mariya Karakasheva
- 2019 – (Czech Republic) Andrea Kossanyiová
- 2021 – (Bulgaria) Zhana Todorova
- 2022 – (France) Lucille Gicquel
- 2023 – (Ukraine) Anastasiia Kraiduba
- 2024 – (Sweden) Isabelle Haak
- 2025 – (Ukraine) Daria Sharhorodska
- 2026 – (Sweden) Isabelle Haak

== See also ==
- Men's European Volleyball League
- Women's European Volleyball Championship
- FIVB Volleyball World Grand Prix
- FIVB Women's Volleyball Nations League
