= 2019 Women's European Volleyball Championship =

Tournament details
- Host countries: Hungary; Poland; Slovakia; Turkey
- Dates: 23 August – 8 September
- Teams: 24

Final positions
- Champions: Serbia (3rd title)

Tournament awards
- MVP: (Serbia) Tijana Bošković

The 2019 Women's European Volleyball Championship was the 31st edition of the Women's European Volleyball Championship, organised by Europe's governing volleyball body, the CEV from 23 August to 8 September 2019. For the first time the Women's EuroVolley was held in four countries: Hungary, Poland, Slovakia and Turkey. The number of national teams participating in the event was also expanded from 16 to 24.

== Qualification ==
| Means of qualification | Qualifier | Means of qualification | | Qualifier |
|---|---|---|---|---|
| Host Countries | Turkey | Qualification | Pool A | Belgium |
| Host Countries | Poland | Qualification | Pool A | Slovenia |
| Host Countries | Hungary | Qualification | Pool B | Croatia |
| Host Countries | Slovakia | Qualification | Pool B | Switzerland |
| 2017 European Championship | Serbia | Qualification | Pool C | Greece |
| 2017 European Championship | Netherlands | Qualification | Pool C | Ukraine |
| 2017 European Championship | Azerbaijan | Qualification | Pool D | France |
| 2017 European Championship | Italy | Qualification | Pool D | Portugal |
| 2017 European Championship | Russia | Qualification | Pool E | Estonia |
| 2017 European Championship | Belarus | Qualification | Pool E | Finland |
| 2017 European Championship | Germany | Qualification | Pool F | Spain |
| 2017 European Championship | Bulgaria | Qualification | Pool F | Romania |
Total 24

== Pools composition ==
The drawing of lots is combined with a seeding of National Federations and performed as follows:

1. The four Organisers are seeded in Preliminary pools. Turkey in Pool A, Poland in Pool B, Hungary in Pool C and Slovakia in Pool D.
2. The first and second best ranked from the previous edition of the CEV competition are drawn in different Preliminary pools,
3. According to the CEV National Team ranking list as per 2 October 2017, National Federations are seeded by descending order in a number of cups that equals the number of Preliminary pools.

| Pot 1 | Pot 2 | Pot 3 | Pot 4 | Pot 5 |
|---|---|---|---|---|
| Serbia; Russia; Italy; Netherlands | Germany; Belgium; Bulgaria; Croatia | Belarus; Ukraine; Azerbaijan; France | Romania; Spain; Finland; Portugal | Switzerland; Slovenia; Greece; Estonia |

Result

The drawing of lots was held on 23 January 2019 at the Basketmakers' Kiosk in Istanbul.

| Pool A | Pool B | Pool C | Pool D |
|---|---|---|---|
| Turkey | Poland | Hungary | Slovakia |
| Serbia | Italy | Netherlands | Russia |
| Bulgaria | Belgium | Croatia | Germany |
| France | Ukraine | Azerbaijan | Belarus |
| Finland | Portugal | Romania | Spain |
| Greece | Slovenia | Estonia | Switzerland |

== Venues ==
| Pool A, All knockout rounds | | Pool B, Round of 16, Quarterfinals | |
|---|---|---|---|
| Ankara, Turkey | Ankara is located in Turkey | Łódź, Poland | Łódź is located in Poland |
| Ankara Arena | Ankara is located in Turkey | Atlas Arena | Łódź is located in Poland |
| Capacity: 10,400 | Ankara is located in Turkey | Capacity: 13,805 | Łódź is located in Poland |
| Pool C, Round of 16 | | Pool D, Round of 16 | |
| Budapest, Hungary | Budapest is located in Hungary | Bratislava, Slovakia | Bratislava is located in Slovakia |
| Budapest Sports Arena | Budapest is located in Hungary | Ondrej Nepela Arena | Bratislava is located in Slovakia |
| Capacity: 12,000 | Budapest is located in Hungary | Capacity: 10,055 | Bratislava is located in Slovakia |

== Pool standing procedure ==
1. Number of matches won
2. Match points
3. Sets ratio
4. Points ratio
5. If the tie continues as per the point ratio between two teams, the priority will be given to the team which won the match between them. When the tie in points ratio is between three or more teams, a new classification of these teams in the terms of points 1, 2, 3 and 4 will be made taking into consideration only the matches in which they were opposed to each other.

Match won 3–0 or 3–1: 3 match points for the winner, 0 match points for the loser
Match won 3–2: 2 match points for the winner, 1 match point for the loser

== Preliminary round ==
=== Pool A ===
All times are Further-eastern European Time (UTC+03:00).

| Pos | Team | Pld | W | L | Pts | SW | SL | SR | SPW | SPL | SPR | Qualification |
|---|---|---|---|---|---|---|---|---|---|---|---|---|
| 1 | Serbia | 5 | 5 | 0 | 15 | 15 | 3 | 5.000 | 431 | 358 | 1.204 | Final round |
| 2 | Turkey | 5 | 4 | 1 | 11 | 13 | 6 | 2.167 | 440 | 373 | 1.180 | Final round |
| 3 | Bulgaria | 5 | 2 | 3 | 7 | 10 | 9 | 1.111 | 405 | 393 | 1.031 | Final round |
| 4 | Greece | 5 | 2 | 3 | 6 | 6 | 10 | 0.600 | 330 | 374 | 0.882 | Final round |
| 5 | Finland | 5 | 1 | 4 | 4 | 6 | 13 | 0.462 | 394 | 428 | 0.921 | |
| 6 | France | 5 | 1 | 4 | 2 | 5 | 14 | 0.357 | 363 | 437 | 0.831 | |

Source: CEV

| Date | Time | | Score | | Set 1 | Set 2 | Set 3 | Set 4 | Set 5 | Total | Report |
|---|---|---|---|---|---|---|---|---|---|---|---|
| 23 Aug | 14:30 | France | 3–2 | Bulgaria | 25–20 | 13–25 | 25–15 | 19–25 | 15–13 | 97–98 | Report |
| 23 Aug | 17:00 | Serbia | 3–0 | Finland | 25–17 | 25–15 | 25–17 | | | 75–49 | Report |
| 23 Aug | 20:00 | Turkey | 3–0 | Greece | 25–21 | 25–18 | 25–8 | | | 75–47 | Report |
| 24 Aug | 17:00 | France | 0–3 | Greece | 12–25 | 21–25 | 21–25 | | | 54–75 | Report |
| 24 Aug | 19:30 | Finland | 2–3 | Turkey | 24–26 | 15–25 | 25–20 | 25–21 | 10–15 | 99–107 | Report |
| 25 Aug | 17:00 | Bulgaria | 1–3 | Serbia | 25–16 | 21–25 | 20–25 | 16–25 | | 82–91 | Report |
| 25 Aug | 19:30 | Greece | 3–1 | Finland | 26–24 | 15–25 | 25–21 | 27–25 | | 93–95 | Report |
| 26 Aug | 17:00 | France | 1–3 | Serbia | 19–25 | 13–25 | 25–17 | 23–25 | | 80–92 | Report |
| 26 Aug | 19:30 | Turkey | 3–1 | Bulgaria | 25–21 | 25–11 | 20–25 | 25–18 | | 95–75 | Report |
| 27 Aug | 17:00 | Finland | 3–1 | France | 25–21 | 25–14 | 22–25 | 25–18 | | 97–78 | Report |
| 27 Aug | 19:30 | Greece | 0–3 | Bulgaria | 22–25 | 17–25 | 17–25 | | | 56–75 | Report |
| 28 Aug | 17:00 | Serbia | 3–0 | Greece | 25–21 | 25–17 | 25–21 | | | 75–59 | Report |
| 28 Aug | 19:30 | France | 0–3 | Turkey | 19–25 | 19–25 | 16–25 | | | 54–75 | Report |
| 29 Aug | 17:00 | Bulgaria | 3–0 | Finland | 25–14 | 25–21 | 25–19 | | | 75–54 | Report |
| 29 Aug | 19:30 | Turkey | 1–3 | Serbia | 25–23 | 19–25 | 22–25 | 22–25 | | 88–98 | Report |

=== Pool B ===
All times are Central European Summer Time (UTC+02:00).

| Pos | Team | Pld | W | L | Pts | SW | SL | SR | SPW | SPL | SPR | Qualification |
|---|---|---|---|---|---|---|---|---|---|---|---|---|
| 1 | Italy | 5 | 4 | 1 | 13 | 14 | 3 | 4.667 | 399 | 295 | 1.353 | Final round |
| 2 | Poland | 5 | 4 | 1 | 12 | 14 | 6 | 2.333 | 453 | 377 | 1.202 | Final round |
| 3 | Belgium | 5 | 4 | 1 | 11 | 12 | 6 | 2.000 | 420 | 361 | 1.163 | Final round |
| 4 | Slovenia | 5 | 2 | 3 | 5 | 6 | 11 | 0.545 | 341 | 377 | 0.905 | Final round |
| 5 | Ukraine | 5 | 1 | 4 | 4 | 6 | 12 | 0.500 | 343 | 407 | 0.843 | |
| 6 | Portugal | 5 | 0 | 5 | 0 | 1 | 15 | 0.067 | 260 | 399 | 0.652 | |

Source: CEV

| Date | Time | | Score | | Set 1 | Set 2 | Set 3 | Set 4 | Set 5 | Total | Report |
|---|---|---|---|---|---|---|---|---|---|---|---|
| 23 Aug | 14:00 | Belgium | 3–0 | Ukraine | 25–10 | 25–19 | 25–22 | | | 75–51 | Report |
| 23 Aug | 17:30 | Italy | 3–0 | Portugal | 25–15 | 25–14 | 25–13 | | | 75–42 | Report |
| 23 Aug | 20:30 | Poland | 3–0 | Slovenia | 25–12 | 25–22 | 25–23 | | | 75–57 | Report |
| 24 Aug | 18:00 | Belgium | 3–0 | Slovenia | 25–13 | 25–21 | 25–20 | | | 75–54 | Report |
| 24 Aug | 20:30 | Portugal | 0–3 | Poland | 14–25 | 16–25 | 11–25 | | | 41–75 | Report |
| 25 Aug | 18:00 | Slovenia | 3–0 | Portugal | 25–21 | 25–20 | 25–9 | | | 75–50 | Report |
| 25 Aug | 21:00 | Ukraine | 0–3 | Italy | 16–25 | 18–25 | 10–25 | | | 44–75 | Report |
| 26 Aug | 18:00 | Italy | 3–0 | Belgium | 25–18 | 25–21 | 25–23 | | | 75–62 | Report |
| 26 Aug | 20:30 | Poland | 3–1 | Ukraine | 20–25 | 25–11 | 25–22 | 25–15 | | 95–73 | Report |
| 27 Aug | 18:00 | Portugal | 1–3 | Belgium | 13–25 | 26–24 | 20–25 | 11–25 | | 70–99 | Report |
| 27 Aug | 21:00 | Italy | 3–0 | Slovenia | 27–25 | 25–8 | 25–17 | | | 77–50 | Report |
| 28 Aug | 17:30 | Belgium | 3–2 | Poland | 20–25 | 27–25 | 20–25 | 25–21 | 17–15 | 109–111 | Report |
| 28 Aug | 20:00 | Ukraine | 2–3 | Slovenia | 25–22 | 21–25 | 25–18 | 21–25 | 8–15 | 100–105 | Report |
| 29 Aug | 18:00 | Portugal | 0–3 | Ukraine | 22–25 | 15–25 | 20–25 | | | 57–75 | Report |
| 29 Aug | 20:30 | Poland | 3–2 | Italy | 25–14 | 19–25 | 13–25 | 25–21 | 15–12 | 97–97 | Report |

=== Pool C ===
All times are Central European Summer Time (UTC+02:00).

| Pos | Team | Pld | W | L | Pts | SW | SL | SR | SPW | SPL | SPR | Qualification |
|---|---|---|---|---|---|---|---|---|---|---|---|---|
| 1 | Netherlands | 5 | 5 | 0 | 15 | 15 | 0 | MAX | 375 | 251 | 1.494 | Final round |
| 2 | Azerbaijan | 5 | 4 | 1 | 10 | 12 | 7 | 1.714 | 426 | 388 | 1.098 | Final round |
| 3 | Croatia | 5 | 3 | 2 | 10 | 11 | 8 | 1.375 | 443 | 422 | 1.050 | Final round |
| 4 | Romania | 5 | 2 | 3 | 6 | 7 | 11 | 0.636 | 386 | 437 | 0.883 | Final round |
| 5 | Hungary | 5 | 1 | 4 | 3 | 4 | 12 | 0.333 | 348 | 379 | 0.918 | |
| 6 | Estonia | 5 | 0 | 5 | 1 | 4 | 15 | 0.267 | 360 | 461 | 0.781 | |

Source: CEV

| Date | Time | | Score | | Set 1 | Set 2 | Set 3 | Set 4 | Set 5 | Total | Report |
|---|---|---|---|---|---|---|---|---|---|---|---|
| 23 Aug | 15:00 | Croatia | 2–3 | Azerbaijan | 13–25 | 25–20 | 25–22 | 24–26 | 15–17 | 102–110 | Report |
| 23 Aug | 17:30 | Netherlands | 3–0 | Romania | 25–21 | 25–18 | 25–9 | | | 75–48 | Report |
| 23 Aug | 20:30 | Hungary | 3–0 | Estonia | 25–15 | 25–17 | 25–15 | | | 75–47 | Report |
| 24 Aug | 18:00 | Estonia | 1–3 | Croatia | 18–25 | 17–25 | 28–26 | 12–25 | | 75–101 | Report |
| 24 Aug | 20:30 | Romania | 3–1 | Hungary | 25–23 | 21–25 | 26–24 | 25–22 | | 97–94 | Report |
| 25 Aug | 15:30 | Azerbaijan | 0–3 | Netherlands | 15–25 | 23–25 | 23–25 | | | 61–75 | Report |
| 25 Aug | 18:00 | Estonia | 1–3 | Romania | 23–25 | 32–30 | 19–25 | 21–25 | | 95–105 | Report |
| 26 Aug | 18:00 | Netherlands | 3–0 | Croatia | 25–16 | 25–18 | 25–23 | | | 75–57 | Report |
| 26 Aug | 20:30 | Hungary | 0–3 | Azerbaijan | 21–25 | 15–25 | 22–25 | | | 58–75 | Report |
| 27 Aug | 18:00 | Netherlands | 3–0 | Estonia | 25–18 | 25–12 | 25–10 | | | 75–40 | Report |
| 27 Aug | 20:30 | Romania | 1–3 | Croatia | 21–25 | 25–23 | 18–25 | 22–25 | | 86–98 | Report |
| 28 Aug | 15:30 | Azerbaijan | 3–2 | Estonia | 25–20 | 18–25 | 25–22 | 22–25 | 15–11 | 105–103 | Report |
| 28 Aug | 18:00 | Croatia | 3–0 | Hungary | 25–20 | 25–23 | 35–33 | | | 85–76 | Report |
| 29 Aug | 15:30 | Romania | 0–3 | Azerbaijan | 15–25 | 14–25 | 21–25 | | | 50–75 | Report |
| 29 Aug | 18:00 | Hungary | 0–3 | Netherlands | 17–25 | 13–25 | 15–25 | | | 45–75 | Report |

=== Pool D ===
All times are Central European Summer Time (UTC+02:00).

| Pos | Team | Pld | W | L | Pts | SW | SL | SR | SPW | SPL | SPR | Qualification |
|---|---|---|---|---|---|---|---|---|---|---|---|---|
| 1 | Germany | 5 | 5 | 0 | 14 | 15 | 4 | 3.750 | 444 | 381 | 1.165 | Final round |
| 2 | Russia | 5 | 4 | 1 | 13 | 14 | 3 | 4.667 | 409 | 304 | 1.345 | Final round |
| 3 | Slovakia | 5 | 3 | 2 | 8 | 10 | 8 | 1.250 | 389 | 402 | 0.968 | Final round |
| 4 | Spain | 5 | 2 | 3 | 5 | 7 | 12 | 0.583 | 415 | 446 | 0.930 | Final round |
| 5 | Switzerland | 5 | 1 | 4 | 4 | 5 | 13 | 0.385 | 375 | 428 | 0.876 | |
| 6 | Belarus | 5 | 0 | 5 | 1 | 4 | 15 | 0.267 | 378 | 449 | 0.842 | |

Source: CEV

| Date | Time | | Score | | Set 1 | Set 2 | Set 3 | Set 4 | Set 5 | Total | Report |
|---|---|---|---|---|---|---|---|---|---|---|---|
| 23 Aug | 14:30 | Switzerland | 0–3 | Germany | 16–25 | 19–25 | 21–25 | | | 56–75 | Report |
| 23 Aug | 17:00 | Belarus | 0–3 | Russia | 24–26 | 16–25 | 22–25 | | | 62–76 | Report |
| 23 Aug | 20:00 | Slovakia | 3–0 | Spain | 26–24 | 29–27 | 25–18 | | | 80–69 | Report |
| 24 Aug | 17:30 | Germany | 3–1 | Spain | 15–25 | 25–19 | 31–29 | 25–18 | | 96–91 | Report |
| 24 Aug | 20:00 | Switzerland | 0–3 | Slovakia | 20–25 | 16–25 | 22–25 | | | 58–75 | Report |
| 25 Aug | 17:30 | Spain | 3–1 | Belarus | 25–22 | 25–22 | 15–25 | 25–17 | | 90–86 | Report |
| 25 Aug | 20:00 | Russia | 3–0 | Switzerland | 28–26 | 25–19 | 25–9 | | | 78–54 | Report |
| 26 Aug | 17:30 | Germany | 3–2 | Russia | 18–25 | 25–21 | 25–23 | 14–25 | 15–11 | 97–105 | Report |
| 26 Aug | 20:00 | Slovakia | 3–2 | Belarus | 22–25 | 22–25 | 25–17 | 25–18 | 16–14 | 110–99 | Report |
| 27 Aug | 17:30 | Spain | 3–2 | Switzerland | 22–25 | 21–25 | 26–24 | 25–22 | 15–13 | 109–109 | Report |
| 27 Aug | 20:00 | Germany | 3–1 | Slovakia | 25–22 | 26–28 | 25–18 | 25–21 | | 101–89 | Report |
| 28 Aug | 17:30 | Russia | 3–0 | Spain | 25–15 | 25–19 | 25–22 | | | 75–56 | Report |
| 28 Aug | 20:00 | Germany | 3–0 | Belarus | 25–10 | 25–15 | 25–15 | | | 75–40 | Report |
| 29 Aug | 15:30 | Slovakia | 0–3 | Russia | 14–25 | 9–25 | 12–25 | | | 35–75 | Report |
| 29 Aug | 18:00 | Switzerland | 3–1 | Belarus | 19–25 | 25–18 | 29–27 | 25–21 | | 98–91 | Report |

== Final round ==
All times in Turkey are Further-eastern European Time (UTC+03:00).
All times in Poland, Hungary and Slovakia are Central European Summer Time (UTC+02:00).

Round of 16
1 September–Ankara, Turkey
Serbia | 3
Romania | 0
1 September–Budapest, Hungary
Azerbaijan | 0
Bulgaria | 3
1 September–Bratislava, Slovakia
Italy | 3
Slovakia | 0
1 September–Bratislava, Slovakia
Russia | 3
Belgium | 1
1 September–Ankara, Turkey
Turkey | 3
Croatia | 2
1 September–Budapest, Hungary
Netherlands | 3
Greece | 0
1 September–Łódź, Poland
Poland | 3
Spain | 0
1 September–Łódź, Poland
Germany | 3
Slovenia | 0

Quarter-finals
4 September–Ankara, Turkey
Serbia | 3
Bulgaria | 0
4 September–Łódź, Poland
Italy | 3
Russia | 1
4 September–Ankara, Turkey
Turkey | 3
Netherlands | 0
4 September–Łódź, Poland
Poland | 3
Germany | 2

Semi-finals
7 September–Ankara, Turkey
Serbia | 3
Italy | 1
7 September–Ankara, Turkey
Turkey | 3
Poland | 1

Gold medal
8 September–Ankara, Turkey
Serbia | 3
Turkey | 2
Bronze medal
8 September–Ankara, Turkey
Italy | 3
Poland | 0

=== Round of 16 ===
| Date | Time | | Score | | Set 1 | Set 2 | Set 3 | Set 4 | Set 5 | Total | Report |
|---|---|---|---|---|---|---|---|---|---|---|---|
| 1 Sep | 15:30 | Russia | 3–1 | Belgium | 25–22 | 25–15 | 21–25 | 25–22 | | 96–84 | Report |
| 1 Sep | 16:00 | Netherlands | 3–0 | Greece | 25–21 | 25–23 | 25–12 | | | 75–56 | Report |
| 1 Sep | 17:00 | Serbia | 3–0 | Romania | 25–20 | 25–17 | 25–23 | | | 75–60 | Report |
| 1 Sep | 18:00 | Germany | 3–0 | Slovenia | 25–21 | 25–15 | 25–20 | | | 75–56 | Report |
| 1 Sep | 18:00 | Italy | 3–0 | Slovakia | 25–20 | 25–23 | 25–20 | | | 75–63 | Report |
| 1 Sep | 18:30 | Azerbaijan | 0–3 | Bulgaria | 12–25 | 16–25 | 23–25 | | | 51–75 | Report |
| 1 Sep | 19:30 | Turkey | 3–2 | Croatia | 26–24 | 18–25 | 31–33 | 25–22 | 16–14 | 116–118 | Report |
| 1 Sep | 20:30 | Poland | 3–0 | Spain | 25–20 | 25–20 | 25–19 | | | 75–59 | Report |

=== Quarterfinals ===
| Date | Time | | Score | | Set 1 | Set 2 | Set 3 | Set 4 | Set 5 | Total | Report |
|---|---|---|---|---|---|---|---|---|---|---|---|
| 4 Sep | 17:00 | Serbia | 3–0 | Bulgaria | 25–19 | 25–18 | 28–26 | | | 78–63 | Report |
| 4 Sep | 18:00 | Italy | 3–1 | Russia | 25–27 | 25–22 | 27–25 | 25–21 | | 102–95 | Report |
| 4 Sep | 19:30 | Turkey | 3–0 | Netherlands | 25–20 | 25–22 | 25–20 | | | 75–62 | Report |
| 4 Sep | 20:30 | Poland | 3–2 | Germany | 22–25 | 25–16 | 25–19 | 17–25 | 15–11 | 104–96 | Report |

=== Semifinals ===
| Date | Time | | Score | | Set 1 | Set 2 | Set 3 | Set 4 | Set 5 | Total | Report |
|---|---|---|---|---|---|---|---|---|---|---|---|
| 7 Sep | 17:00 | Serbia | 3–1 | Italy | 25–22 | 25–21 | 21–25 | 25–20 | | 96–88 | Report |
| 7 Sep | 19:30 | Turkey | 3–1 | Poland | 25–17 | 25–16 | 14–25 | 25–18 | | 89–76 | Report |

=== Third place ===
| Date | Time | | Score | | Set 1 | Set 2 | Set 3 | Set 4 | Set 5 | Total | Report |
|---|---|---|---|---|---|---|---|---|---|---|---|
| 8 Sep | 17:00 | Italy | 3–0 | Poland | 25–23 | 25–20 | 26–24 | | | 76–67 | Report |

=== Final ===
| Date | Time | | Score | | Set 1 | Set 2 | Set 3 | Set 4 | Set 5 | Total | Report |
|---|---|---|---|---|---|---|---|---|---|---|---|
| 8 Sep | 19:30 | Serbia | 3–2 | Turkey | 21–25 | 25–21 | 25–21 | 22–25 | 15–13 | 108–105 | Report |

== Final standing ==
| Rank | Team |
|---|---|
| 1st place, gold medalist(s) | Serbia |
| 2nd place, silver medalist(s) | Turkey |
| 3rd place, bronze medalist(s) | Italy |
| 4 | Poland |
| 5 | Netherlands |
| 6 | Germany |
| 7 | Russia |
| 8 | Bulgaria |
| 9 | Belgium |
| 10 | Azerbaijan |
| 11 | Croatia |
| 12 | Slovakia |
| 13 | Romania |
| 14 | Greece |
| 15 | Spain |
| 16 | Slovenia |
| 17 | Ukraine |
| 18 | Finland |
| 19 | Switzerland |
| 20 | Hungary |
| 21 | France |
| 22 | Belarus |
| 23 | Estonia |
| 24 | Portugal |

2019 Women's European Championship

Serbia
3rd title

14–woman roster
Bianka Buša, Katarina Lazović, Mina Popović, Slađana Mirković, Brankica Mihajlović, Maja Ognjenović (C), Stefana Veljković, Teodora Pušić, Ana Bjelica, Maja Aleksić, Silvija Popović, Tijana Bošković, Bojana Milenković, Jelena Blagojević
Head coach
Zoran Terzić

== Individual awards ==
- Most valuable player
  (Serbia) Tijana Bošković
- Best setter
  (Serbia) Maja Ognjenović
- Best outside spikers
  (Serbia) Brankica Mihajlović
  (Italy) Miriam Sylla
- Best middle blockers
  (Turkey) Eda Erdem Dündar
  (Poland) Agnieszka Kąkolewska
- Best opposite spiker
  (Serbia) Tijana Bošković
- Best libero
  (Turkey) Simge Şebnem Aköz

== See also ==
- 2019 Men's European Volleyball Championship
