= 2024 FIVB Women's Volleyball Challenger Cup squads =

This article shows the roster of all the participating teams at the 2024 FIVB Women's Volleyball Challenger Cup.

== Argentina ==
The following are Argentina's roster at the 2024 FIVB Women's Volleyball Challenger Cup.

Head coach: Facundo Morando

- 1 Elina Maria Rodríguez OH
- 2 Emilia Balagué S
- 3 Yamila Nizetich OH
- 6 Bianca Bertolino OH
- 7 Dalma Nicole Pérez OH
- 9 Bianca Cugno OP
- 10 Daniela Simian Bulaich OH
- 11 Bianca Farriol MB
- 14 Victoria Mayer S
- 15 Antonela Fortuna L
- 17 Candelaria Herrera MB
- 18 Martina Bednarek OP
- 19 Brenda Graff MB
- 20 María Agostina Pelozo L

== Belgium ==
The following are Belgium's roster at the 2024 FIVB Women's Volleyball Challenger Cup.

Head coach: Kris Vansnick

- 1 Saar Bertels OH
- 2 Elise Van Sas S
- 9 Nel Demeyer OH
- 10 Pauline Martin OP
- 11 Anke Waelkens MB
- 14 Lien Van Geertruyden S
- 15 Charline Humblet MB
- 17 Kaat Cos OH
- 18 Britt Rampelberg L
- 20 Britt Fransen MB
- 21 Manon Stragier OH
- 22 Anna Koulberg MB
- 23 Noor Debouck L

== Czech Republic ==
The following are the Czech Republic's roster at the 2024 FIVB Women's Volleyball Challenger Cup.

Head coach: (Greece) Ioannis Athanasopoulos

- 1 Ema Kneiflová MB
- 4 Silvie Pavlová MB
- 6 Helena Havelková OH
- 7 Magdalena Bukovská OH
- 8 Ela Koulisiani MB
- 9 Daniela Digrinová L
- 10 Kateřina Valková S
- 11 Veronika Dostálová L
- 15 Magdaléna Jehlářová MB
- 16 Michaela Mlejnková OH
- 17 Klára Faltínová OH
- 20 Květa Grabovská S
- 22 Gabriela Orvošová OP
- 25 Monika Brancuská OP

== Kenya ==
The following are Kenya's roster at the 2024 FIVB Women's Volleyball Challenger Cup.

Head coach: Japheth Munala

- 1 Esther Mutinda S
- 2 Veronica Oluoch OH
- 3 Pamella Owino OP
- 4 Leonida Kasaya OH
- 5 Sharon Chepchumba OP
- 6 Belinda Barasa MB
- 7 Emmaculate Misoki S
- 8 Trizah Atuka MB
- 13 Juliana Namutira OH
- 14 Lincy Jeruto L
- 15 Lorine Kaei MB
- 16 Agripina Kundu L
- 18 Jemimah Nelima OH
- 19 Edith Mukuvilani MB

== Philippines ==
The following are the Philippines's roster at the 2024 FIVB Women's Volleyball Challenger Cup.

Head coach: (Brazil) Jorge Edson

- 1 Faith Nisperos OP
- 2 Fifi Sharma MB
- 3 Vanie Gandler OH
- 4 Bella Belen OH
- 5 Dawn Macandili-Catindig L
- 6 Julia Coronel OH
- 11 Jia de Guzman S
- 12 Angel Canino OP
- 13 Dell Palomata MB
- 16 Arah Panique OP
- 17 Thea Gagate MB
- 18 Sisi Rondina OH
- 22 Cherry Nunag L
- 23 Jema Galanza OH

== Puerto Rico ==
The following are Puerto Rico's roster at the 2024 FIVB Women's Volleyball Challenger Cup.

Head coach: Juan Carlos Núñez

- 1 Destiny Walker OH
- 2 Shara Venegas L
- 3 Valeria León OH
- 5 Wilmarie Rivera S
- 6 Jennifer Nogueras S
- 10 Diana Reyes MB
- 12 Neira Ortiz MB
- 13 Stephanie Rivera OH
- 16 Paola Cabrera OH
- 17 Decelise Champion OP
- 18 Alba Hernández MB
- 23 Grace López OP

== Sweden ==
The following are Sweden's roster at the 2024 FIVB Women's Volleyball Challenger Cup.

Head coach: (Italy) Giulio Cesare Bregoli

- 3 Linda Andersson MB
- 5 Cecilia Malm OH
- 7 Hedda Broberg MB
- 11 Alexandra Lazić OH
- 12 Hilda Gustafsson S
- 13 Filippa Brink OH
- 15 Kirsten Van Leusen MB
- 16 Vilma Julevik S
- 17 Anna Haak OH
- 18 Julia Nilsson MB
- 19 Paulina Lindberg OP
- 20 Saga Nilsson L
- 25 Emmy Andersson L

== Vietnam ==
The following are Vietnam's roster at the 2024 FIVB Women's Volleyball Challenger Cup.

Head coach: Nguyễn Tuấn Kiệt

- 1 Nguyễn Thị Trà My OP
- 3 Trần Thị Thanh Thúy OH
- 6 Lê Thị Yến L
- 8 Lê Thanh Thúy MB
- 10 Nguyễn Thị Bích Tuyền OH
- 11 Hoàng Thị Kiều Trinh OP
- 12 Nguyễn Khánh Đang L
- 14 Võ Thị Kim Thoa S
- 15 Nguyễn Thị Trinh MB
- 16 Vi Thị Như Quỳnh OH
- 18 Phạm Thị Hiền MB
- 19 Đoàn Thị Lâm Oanh S
- 20 Trần Tú Linh OH
- 23 Đinh Thị Trà Giang MB

== See also ==
- 2024 FIVB Men's Volleyball Challenger Cup squads
