= Beta Dumančić =

Croatian volleyball player (born 1991)

- Dumančić in 2026

Personal information
- Born: 26 March 1991 (age 35) Osijek, Croatia
- Height: 1.89 m (6 ft 2 in)
- Weight: 75 kg (165 lb)
- Spike: 301 cm (119 in)
- Block: 293 cm (115 in)

Volleyball information
- Position: Middle blocker
- Current club: Columbus Fury
- Number: 11

Career
- Years: Team
- 2006–2012 2012–2015 2015–2016 2016–2017 2017–2020 2020–2021 2021–2022 2022–2023 2023–2024 2025-: (Croatia) ŽOK Osijek (United States) Clemson Tigers (Czech Republic) VK UP Olomouc (Poland) PTPS Piła (Germany) Schweriner SC (Italy) Volley Bergamo (Germany) Rote Raben Vilsbiburg (Romania) Dinamo București (Greece) Aris Thessaloniki (United States) Columbus Fury

National team
- Years: Team
- Croatia
Honours
Women's volleyball
Representing Croatia
FIVB Challenger Cup
Gold medal – first place	2022 Zadar
Mediterranean Games
Gold medal – first place	2018 Tarragona
European League
Silver medal – second place	2021 Ruse
Silver medal – second place	2019 Varaždin

Beta Dumančić (born 26 March 1991) is a Croatian volleyball player. She played as middle blocker for Greek club Aris Thessaloniki. She signed with the Columbus Fury for the 2025 season of the Pro Volleyball Federation.

== International career ==
She is a member of the Croatia women's national volleyball team. She competed at the 2021 Women's European Volleyball League, winning a silver medal.
