= Božana Butigan =

Croatian volleyball player (born 2000)

Personal information
- Born: 19 August 2000 (age 26); Mostar, Bosnia and Herzegovina
- Height: 1.90 m (6 ft 3 in)
- Weight: 78 kg (172 lb)
- Spike: 305 cm (120 in)
- Block: 280 cm (110 in)

Volleyball information
- Position: Middle blocker
- Current club: Azzurra Volley Firenze

Career
Years	Teams
2014–2016; 2016–2020; 2020–2022; 2022–2024; 2024–	HOK Čapljina; HAOK Mladost; Imoco Volley Conegliano; Volley Bergamo; Azzurra Volley Firenze

National team
Croatia
Honours
Women's volleyball
Representing Croatia
FIVB Challenger Cup
Gold medal – first place	2022 Zadar
Mediterranean Games
Gold medal – first place	2018 Tarragona
European League
Silver medal – second place	2021 Ruse
Silver medal – second place	2019 Varaždin

Božana Butigan (born 19 August 2000) is a Croatian volleyball player. She plays as middle blocker for Italian club Azzurra Volley Firenze.

== International career ==
She is a member of the Croatia women's national volleyball team. She competed at the 2017 FIVB Volleyball World Grand Prix, 2018 Mediterranean Games, 2019 Women's European Volleyball League, and 2021 Women's European Volleyball League, winning a silver medal.

== Awards ==
=== Club ===
Imoco Volley Conegliano

- Italian League: 2021
- Italian Cup: 2021, 2022
- Italian Supercup: 2020, 2021
- CEV Champions League: 2021
