= Diana Reyes (volleyball) =

Puerto Rican volleyball player (born 1993)

Personal information
- Nationality: Puerto rican/Dominican
- Born: 29 April 1993 (age 33); Caguas, Puerto Rico
- Height: 1.91 m (6 ft 3 in)
- Weight: 80 kg (176 lb)
- Spike: 303 cm (119 in)
- Block: 299 cm (118 in)

Volleyball information
- Current club: Criollas de Caguas
- Number: 10

Career
Years	Teams
2010–2016	Criollas de Caguas
2017–2018	Club Sporting Cristal
2019–2021	Criollas de Caguas
2021–2022	Pannaxiakos
2022	Criollas de Caguas
2022–2023	Al-Ahly
2024–	Criollas de Caguas

National team
2010–	Puerto Rico
Medal record
Women's volleyball
Representing Puerto Rico
FIVB Challenger Cup
Silver medal – second place	2024 Manila	Team
Bronze medal – third place	2022 Zadar	Team
Women's NORCECA Volleyball Championship
Bronze medal – third place	2015 Morelia	Team
Silver medal – second place	2021 Guadalajara	Team
Pan-American Cup
Silver medal – second place	2016 Santo Domingo	Team
Central American and Caribbean Games
Bronze medal – third place	2026 Santo Domingo	Team

Diana Reyes (born 29 April 1993) is a Puerto Rican volleyball player who plays for the Puerto Rico women's national volleyball team.

== Club career ==
On club level, Reyes started her career at Criollas de Caguas in 2010. She later joined Peruvian club Sporting Cristal in 2017–18. She then returned to Criollas de Caguas, before playing for Greek side Pannaxiakos in 2021–2022. She rejoined Criollas de Caguas in 2022, before moving to Egypt to join Al-Ahly for the 2022–23 season, along with her compatriot Karina Ocasio. In 2024, she returned once more to her first club, Criollas de Caguas.

== International career ==
Reyes made her debut for Puerto Rico during the 2010 FIVB Volleyball World Grand Prix. She later won the bronze medal at the 2015 Women's NORCECA Volleyball Championship and the silver medal at the 2016 Women's Pan-American Volleyball Cup and the 2021 Women's NORCECA Volleyball Championship. In 2022, she won the bronze medal at the Volleyball Challenger Cup and at the NORCECA Final Six. Reyes won the bronze medal at the 2026 Central American and Caribbean Games with her national team.

== Awards ==
Criollas de Caguas

- Liga de Voleibol Superior Femenino: 2011, 2014, 2015, 2016, 2019, 2021

Al Ahly

- Egyptian League: 2022–23

Individual

- Liga de Voleibol Superior Femenino : 2013 (Rising star), 2019 (Best return)
