= Héléna Cazaute =

French volleyball player (born 1997)

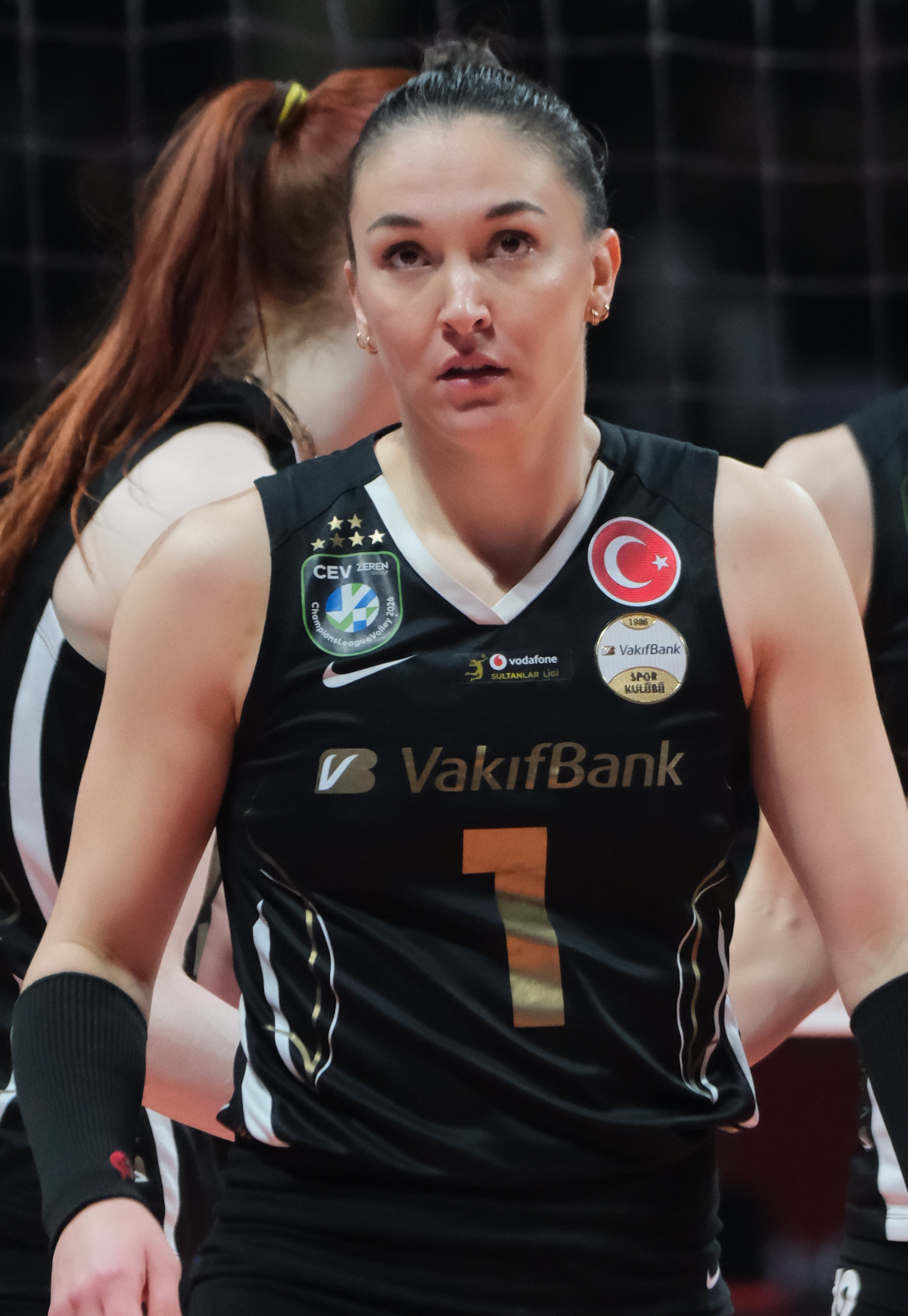
- Héléna Cazaute of VakıfBank (April 2026)

Personal information
- Born: 17 December 1997 (age 28) Narbonne, France
- Height: 1.84 m (6 ft 0 in)
- Weight: 76 kg (168 lb)
- Spike: 305 cm (120 in)
- Block: 285 cm (112 in)

Volleyball information
- Position: Outside Hitter / Opposite
- Current club: VakıfBank[
- Number: 1

Career
- Years: Team
- 2012–2013; 2013–2014; 2014–2017; 2017–2019; 2019–2021; 2021–2023; 2023–2025; 2025–: VC Gruissan; France Avenir 2024; Béziers Volley; RC Cannes; ASPTT Mulhouse; Reale Mutua Fenera Chieri '76; Numia Vero Volley Milano; VakıfBank

National team
- Years: Team
- 2013–2014; 2018–: France youth; France
Honours
Women's Volleyball
Representing France

Héléna Cazaute (born 17 December 1997) is a French volleyball player. She is 1.84 m (6 ft 1/2 in) tall, and plays in the Outside Hitter position for the Istanbul-based club VakıfBank in the Sultans League, and the France national team.

== Club career ==
=== France ===
As the daughter of volleyball player father and mother, who was also coach of the France girls's national youth volleyball team, Cazaute started playing volleyball at the age of fourteen, in the local club VC Gruissan's reserve team. In her first playing year, she won the French Cadets Championships with her team, and was named the "Best Player" of the final tournament.

The experienced hitter played then for VC Gruissan, France Avenir, Béziers Volley. At the age of nineteen, while playing for Béziers Volley, she suffered rupture of cruciate ligaments . Later, she was with RC Cannes and ASPTT Mulhouse in her country. With RC Cannes, she won the 2017–18 French Cup, and was mamed the "Best Spiker". With ASPTT Mulhouse, she won the 2021 LNV Ligue A Féminine, and was named "Most Valuable Player" (MVP) and the "Best Spiker", she won as well as the 2020–21 French Cup and was named MVP.

=== Italy ===
Cazaute then moved to Italy to join Reale Mutua Fenera Chieri '76, and Numia Vero Volley Milano. Cazaute won two French Leagues and two French Cups, won one CEV Challenge Cup as well as one silver and one bronze medal in the CEV Champions League.

=== Turkey ===
In June 2025, she went to Turkey and transferred to VakıfBank. She won the 2025–26 Turkish Women's Volleyball League and the 2025–26 CEV Women's Champions League with her team.

== International career ==
=== France girls' national youth team ===
Cazaute's success in the first year of her career drew the attention of the French national team's selection committee. She was admitted in the France girls' national youth volleyball team for two years, and debuted at the 2013 CEV Youth Volleyball European Championship - Women.

=== France women's national team ===
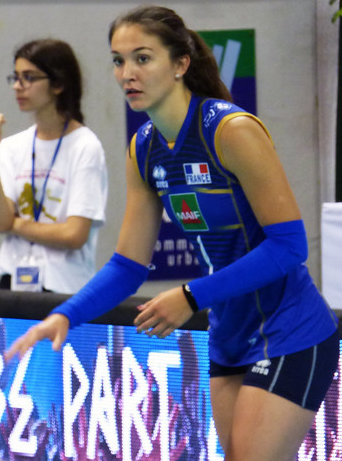
Héléna Cazaute of France national team (2018)

Cazaute is a member of the France women's national volleyball team, and serves as their captain. She played at the EuroVolley in 2019, and 2021, won one gold at the 2022 European Gold League, and one gold at the 2023 Challenger Cup,. She took part in the 2024 Paris Olympic Games. She played at the FIVB Nations League in 2024 and 2025 as well as at the 2025 FIVB World Championship.

Wşth the national team, she became champion at the 2023 FIVB Women's Volleyball Challenger Cup, and was named the "Best Attacking Player" and the "Best Defending Player".

== Personal life ==
Héléna Cazaute was born to Régis and Anik Cazaute, both former volleyball players, in Narbonne, France on 17 December 1997. She and her family reside in the nearby town Gruissan.

== Honours ==
=== Club ===
RC Cannes

LNV Ligue A
(gold) 2019

ASPTT Mulhouse

LNV Ligue A
(gold) 2021

Chieri '76 Volleyball

CEV Challenge Cup
(gold) 2022–23

Numia Vero Volley Milano

CEV Champions League
(silver) 2023–24
(bronze) 2024–25

VakıfBank

Turkish League
(gold) 2025–26

CEV Champions League

(gold) 2025–26

== International ==
=== France ===
European League
(gold) 2022

FIVB Challenger Cup
(gold) 2023

=== Individual ===
Most Valuable Player
ASPTT Mulhouse (2021 LNV Ligue A, 2020–21 French Cup)

Best Spiker
RC Cannes (2017–18 French Cup),
ASPTT Mulhouse (2021 LNV Ligue A)

Best Attacking Player
France (2023 FIVB Challenger Cup)

Best Defending Playet
France (2023 FIVB Challenger Cup)
