= Estonia women's national volleyball team =

Women's national volleyball team representing Estonia

Estonia
- Association: Eesti Võrkpalli Liit
- Confederation: CEV
- Head coach: Andres Toobal
- FIVB ranking: 68 ▼2 (24 May 2026)

Uniforms
Home	Away
- www.volley.ee

The Estonia women's national volleyball team represents Estonia in international women's volleyball competitions and friendly matches.

As of 2022, team captain has been Liis Kiviloo.

== Results ==
=== European Volleyball League ===
European League record
Year	Round	Position	Pld	W	L	SW	SL	Squad
2009	Did not participate							
2010	Did not participate							
2011	Did not participate							
2012	Did not participate							
2013	Did not participate							
2014	Did not participate							
2015	Did not participate							
2016	Did not participate							
2017	Did not participate							
2018		16th	8	5	3	18	14	
2019		17th	6	2	4	8	16	
2021		16th	6	3	3	12	12	
2022		13th	8	3	5	16	17	
2023		10th	8	7	1	21	7	
2024		11th	6	1	5	4	16	
2025	Did not participate							
2026		20th	6	1	5	4	17	
Total	0 titles							

=== European Championship ===
- 2019 — 23rd place
- 2023 — 23rd place
- 2026 — did not qualify

== Team ==
=== Current squad ===
The following is the Estonian roster in the women's volleyball tournament of the 2023 Women's European Volleyball Championship.

Head coach: (Italy) Alessandro Orefice

No.	Name	Date of birth	Pos*	Height	Weight	Spike	Block	2022–23 club
1	Nette Peit	27 March 1992	OS	1.77 m (5 ft 10 in)	69 kg (152 lb)	310 cm (120 in)	295 cm (116 in)	(France) Quimper Volley 29
4	Kristiine Miilen	4 December 1996	OS	1.83 m (6 ft 0 in)	75 kg (165 lb)	308 cm (121 in)	296 cm (117 in)	(France) Vandœuvre Nancy
5	Liis Kiviloo	2 May 1991	MB	1.91 m (6 ft 3 in)	76 kg (168 lb)	315 cm (124 in)	300 cm (120 in)	(Italy) US Esperia Cremona
7	Eliise Hollas	29 December 1993	MB	1.85 m (6 ft 1 in)	78 kg (172 lb)	305 cm (120 in)	290 cm (110 in)	(Italy) Assitec Volleyball Sant'Elia
8	Salme Adeele Hollas	9 June 2004	OH	1.77 m (5 ft 10 in)	0 kg (0 lb)	272 cm (107 in)	260 cm (100 in)	(Estonia) Barrus/Võru
11	Kertu Laak	21 February 1998	OP	1.89 m (6 ft 2 in)	82 kg (181 lb)	310 cm (120 in)	295 cm (116 in)	(Poland) BKS Bielsko-Biała
12	Janelle Leenurm	24 October 2005	LB	1.72 m (5 ft 8 in)	0 kg (0 lb)	264 cm (104 in)	249 cm (98 in)	(Estonia) Audentes SG/NK
13	Silvia Pertens	2 June 1998	OS	1.82 m (6 ft 0 in)	0 kg (0 lb)	300 cm (120 in)	290 cm (110 in)	(Slovenia) GEN-I Volley
14	Merilin Paalo	6 January 1992	OH	1.74 m (5 ft 9 in)	0 kg (0 lb)	286 cm (113 in)	273 cm (107 in)	(Estonia) TalTech/Tradehouse
16	Karolina Kibbermann	12 February 2002	ST	1.77 m (5 ft 10 in)	0 kg (0 lb)	280 cm (110 in)	270 cm (110 in)	(France) VC Marcq-en-Barœul
17	Häli Vahula	13 July 2004	ST	1.73 m (5 ft 8 in)	0 kg (0 lb)	268 cm (106 in)	262 cm (103 in)	(Estonia) Audentes SG/NK
19	Kadi Kullerkann	19 August 1992	OP	1.95 m (6 ft 5 in)	0 kg (0 lb)	313 cm (123 in)	297 cm (117 in)	(Italy) US Esperia Cremona
20	Kätriin Põld	3 July 2002	MB	1.86 m (6 ft 1 in)	0 kg (0 lb)	305 cm (120 in)	290 cm (110 in)	(Estonia) TalTech/Tradehouse
21	Kadi Kangro	23 August 2004	LB	1.71 m (5 ft 7 in)	0 kg (0 lb)	272 cm (107 in)	262 cm (103 in)	(Estonia) Audentes SG/NK

- Positions:

LB – Libero
MB – Middle-blocker
OP – Opposite
OS – Outside-spiker
ST – Setter

== Statistics ==
=== Most games for Estonia ===
As of 13 August 2022

Rank	Player	Years	Games
1	**Liis Kullerkann**	2013–	113
2	Julija Mõnnakmäe	2013–2022	112
3	**Nette Peit**	2013–	111
4	**Kertu Laak**	2013–	96
5	**Kristiine Miilen**	2013–	95
6	**Eliise Hollas**	2013–	89
7	**Eliisa Peit**	2012–2021	86
8	**Kristi Nõlvak**	2015–2021	76
9	**Anu Ennok**	2012–2021	75
10	**Kadi Kullerkann**	2013–	57

Players in bold are still active at club level.

== See also ==
- Estonia men's national volleyball team
