= Klara Perić =

Croatian volleyball player (born 1998)

Personal information
- Born: 20 March 1998 (age 28); Vinkovci, Croatia
- Height: 1.85 m (6 ft 1 in)
- Weight: 71 kg (157 lb)

Volleyball information
- Position: Setter
- Current club: OK Dinamo

Career
Years	Teams
2014–2016; 2016–2017; 2017–2018; 2018–2019; 2019–2020; 2020–2023; 2025–	HAOK Mladost; Pomì Casalmaggiore; CV Barcelona; GEN-I Volley; LP Vampula; HAOK Mladost; OK Dinamo

National team
Croatia
Honours
Women's volleyball
Representing Croatia
FIVB Challenger Cup
Gold medal – first place	2022 Zadar
European League
Silver medal – second place	2021 Ruse

Klara Perić (born 30 March 1998) is a Croatian volleyball player. She plays as setter for Croatian club OK Dinamo.

== International career ==
She is a member of the Croatia women's national volleyball team. She competed at the 2016 FIVB Volleyball Women's Club World Championship, and 2021 Women's European Volleyball League, winning a silver medal.
