= Michaela Mlejnková =

Czech volleyball player (born 1996)

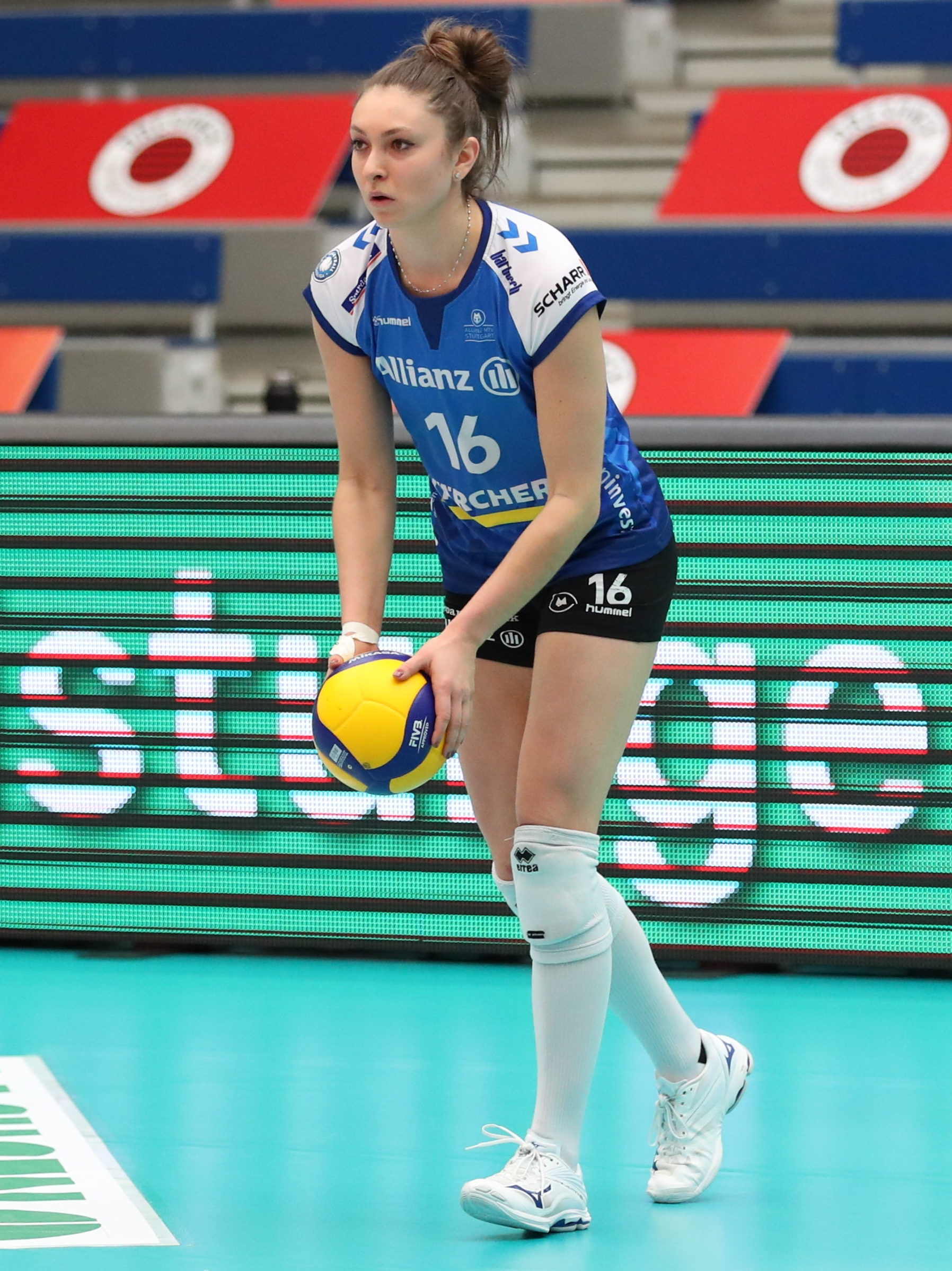

Personal information
- Nationality: Czech
- Born: 26 July 1996 (age 30); Jilemnice, Czech Republic
- Height: 184 cm (72 in)
- Weight: 70 kg (154 lb)
- Spike: 305 cm (120 in)
- Block: 298 cm (117 in)

Volleyball information
- Position: Outside-spiker
- Current club: (Greece) Olympiacos SF Piraeus
- Number: 12 (national team)

Career
Years	Teams
2010–2011; 2011–2015; 2015–2018; 2018–2020; 2020–2021; 2021–2022; 2022–2023; 2023–2024; 2024–2026; 2026–	(Czech Republic) VK TU Liberec (Czech Republic) PVK Olymp Praha (Germany) Allianz MTV Stuttgart (Poland) KS Developres Rzeszów (Germany) Allianz MTV Stuttgart (France) Volero Le Cannet (Turkey) Belediyesi Sigorta Ankara (Greece) Olympiacos Piraeus (Italy) Volley Bergamo (Greece) Olympiacos Piraeus

National team
2015	Czech Republic
Honours
Women's volleyball
Representing Czech Republic
FIVB Challenger Cup
Silver medal – second place	2019 Lima
Gold medal – first place	2024 Manila
- Last updated: 10 July 2026

Michaela Mlejnková (born 26 July 1996) is a Czech volleyball player, playing as an outside-spiker. She is part of the Czech Republic women's national volleyball team.

She participated in the 2014 FIVB Volleyball World Grand Prix, and 2015 FIVB Volleyball World Grand Prix, and 2016 FIVB Volleyball World Grand Prix.
She competed at the 2015 Women's European Volleyball Championship. and 2019 Women's European Volleyball League, winning a gold medal.
On club level she plays in 2026-27 season in Hellenic Volley League with Olympiacos Piraeus.

== Sporting achievements ==
=== National team ===
- 2018 European League
- 2019 European League
- 2019 FIVB Challenger Cup
- 2022 European League
- 2024 European League
- 2024 FIVB Challenger Cup

=== Club ===
==== National championships ====
- 2011/2012 Czech Championship, with Olymp Prague
- 2012/2013 Czech Championship, with Olymp Prague
- 2013/2014 Czech Championship, with Olymp Prague
- 2014/2015 Czech Championship, with Olymp Prague
- 2015/2016 German Championship, with Allianz Stuttgart
- 2016/2017 German Championship, with Allianz Stuttgart
- 2016/2017 German Championship, with Allianz Stuttgart
- 2019/2020 Polish Championship, with Developres Rzeszów
- 2020/2021 German Championship, with Allianz Stuttgart
- 2021/2022 French Championship, with Volero Le Cannet
- 2023/2024 Hellenic Championship, with Olympiacos Piraeus

==== National Cups ====
- 2016 German Super Cup, with Allianz Stuttgart
- 2016/2017 German Cup, with Allianz Stuttgart
- 2021/2022 French Cup, with Volero Le Cannet
- 2023/2024 Hellenic Cup, with Olympiacos Piraeus

=== Individuals ===
- 2015 FIVB U20 World Championship – European qualification: Top scorer (103 points)
- 2017 German Cup: Top scorer (49 points)
- 2018 European League (Final round): Top scorer (43 points) – Best spiker (38 points)
- 2024 Hellenic Cup Final–4: MVP
- 2023/24 Hellenic Championship: Best Outside Spiker (Ranking index: 0.361)
