= FIVB Volleyball Challenger Cup =

FIVB Volleyball Challenger Cup may refer to

- FIVB Men's Volleyball Challenger Cup
- FIVB Women's Volleyball Challenger Cup
