= Gabriela Orvošová =

Czech volleyball player

Personal information
- Nationality: Czech
- Born: 28 January 2001 (age 25)
- Height: 6 ft 3 in (1.91 m)
- Weight: 76 kg (168 lb)
- Spike: 306 cm (120 in)
- Block: 297 cm (117 in)

Volleyball information
- Position: Opposite spiker
- Current club: Panathinaikos

Career
Years	Teams
2015–2020; 2020–2022; 2022–2024; 2024–2025; 2025–2026; 2026; 2026–	VK UP Olomouc; BKS Bielsko-Biała; KS Developres Rzeszów; Roma Volley Club; VakıfBank; Nilüfer Belediyespor; Panathinaikos

National team
Czech Republic.
Honours
Women's volleyball
Representing Czech Republic
FIVB Challenger Cup
Gold medal – first place	2024 Manila

Gabriela Orvošová (born 28 January 2001) is a Czech volleyball playerwho plays as an outside hitter for Panathinaikos and the Czech Republic national team.

She competed at the 2019 Women's European Volleyball League, winning a gold medal.

== Sporting achievements ==
=== Clubs ===
Cadet Czech Championship:

- 2017

MEVZA:

- 2019
- 2018

Czech Championship:

- 2019
- 2018

Czech Cup:

- 2019

=== National team ===
European League:

- 2019
- 2018
