= Lucie Smutná =

Czech volleyball player (born 1991)

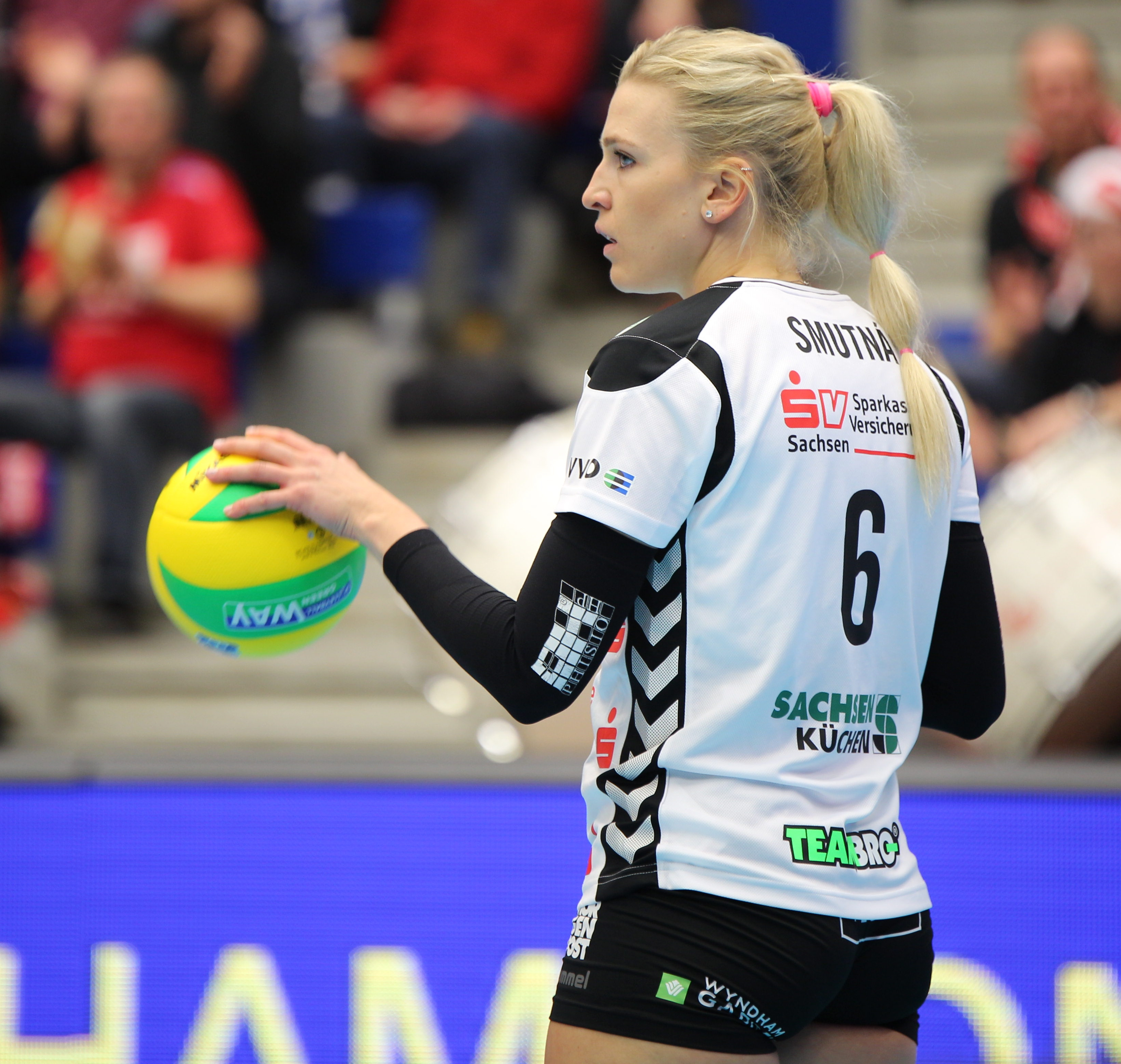

Personal information
- Nationality: Czech
- Born: 14 April 1991 (age 35)
- Height: 181 cm (71 in)
- Weight: 75 kg (165 lb)
- Spike: 307 cm (121 in)
- Block: 285 cm (112 in)

Volleyball information
- Position: Setter
- Current club: (Romania) CSM Volei Alba Blaj
- Number: 6 (national team)

National team
Czech Republic

Lucie Smutná (born 14 April 1991) is a Czech female volleyball player, playing as a setter. She is part of the Czech Republic women's national volleyball team. On club level she plays for CSM Volei Alba Blaj since the summer of 2018.

She competed at the 2015 Women's European Volleyball Championship. She participated in the 2014 FIVB Volleyball World Grand Prix, and in the 2016 FIVB Volleyball World Grand Prix.
