= Eva Rutarová =

Czech volleyball player (born 1989)

Personal information
- Nationality: Czech
- Born: 14 September 1989 (age 37)
- Height: 198 cm (78 in)
- Weight: 93 kg (205 lb)
- Spike: 317 cm (125 in)
- Block: 305 cm (120 in)

Volleyball information
- Number: 9 (national team)

Career
Years	Teams
2014–	SK UP Olomouc

National team
2014–	Czech Republic

Eva Rutarová (born 14 September 1989) is a Czech female volleyball player. She is part of the Czech Republic women's national volleyball team.

She participated in the 2014 FIVB Volleyball World Grand Prix, and in the 2015 FIVB Volleyball World Grand Prix. On club level she played for SK UP Olomouc in 2014.
