= 2024 FIVB Women's Volleyball Challenger Cup =

Volleyball competition held in Manila, Philippines

- Official logo

Tournament details
- Host country: Philippines
- City: Manila
- Dates: 4–7 July
- Teams: 8 (from 5 confederations)
- Venue: 1 (in 1 host city)

Final positions
- Champions: Czech Republic (1st title)
- Runners-up: Puerto Rico
- Third place: Vietnam
- Fourth place: Belgium

Tournament statistics
- Matches played: 8
- Attendance: 8,867 (1,108 per match)
- Best scorer: (Vietnam) Nguyễn Thị Bích Tuyền (77 points)
- Best spiker: (Vietnam) Nguyễn Thị Bích Tuyền (43.20%)
- Best blocker: (Belgium) Britt Fransen (4.00 Avg)
- Best server: (Puerto Rico) Wilmarie Rivera (1.33 Avg)
- Best setter: (Czech Republic) Kateřina Valková (18.67 Avg)
- Best digger: (Vietnam) Nguyễn Khánh Đang (13.00 Avg)
- Best receiver: (Puerto Rico) Stephanie Rivera (23.44%)

The 2024 FIVB Women's Volleyball Challenger Cup was the fifth and last edition of the FIVB Women's Volleyball Challenger Cup, an annual women's international volleyball tournament contested by eight national teams that acted as a qualifier for the FIVB Women's Volleyball Nations League. The tournament was held at the Ninoy Aquino Stadium in Manila, the Philippines, between 4 and 7 July 2024.

The host Philippines were the only debutants in this edition.

The Czech Republic won the title and earned the right to participate in the 2025 Nations League after defeating Puerto Rico in the final. Vietnam defeated Belgium in the 3rd place match, but Belgium still qualified for the 2025 Nations League through FIVB World Ranking.

== Qualification ==
A total of 8 teams qualified for the tournament.

| Country | Confederation | Qualified as | Qualified on | Previous appearances | | | Previous best performance |
| Country | Confederation | Qualified as | Qualified on | Total | First | Last | Previous best performance |
|---|---|---|---|---|---|---|---|
| Kenya | CAVB | Highest ranked in CAVB | —N/a | 1 | 2023 | | 6th place (2023) |
| Argentina | CSV | Highest ranked in CSV | —N/a | 1 | 2019 | | 3rd place (2019) |
| Philippines | AVC | Host country | 8 May 2024 | 0 | None | | None |
| Puerto Rico | NORCECA | 2023 NORCECA Final Four champions | 11 June 2023 | 2 | 2018 | 2022 | 3rd place (2018, 2022) |
| Vietnam | AVC | 2024 Asian Challenge Cup champions | 29 May 2024 | 1 | 2023 | | 8th place (2023) |
| Sweden | CEV | 2024 European Golden League champions | 15 June 2024 | 1 | 2023 | | Runners-up (2023) |
| Czech Republic | CEV | 2024 European Golden League runners-up | 15 June 2024 | 2 | 2019 | 2022 | Runners-up (2019) |
| Belgium | CEV | World ranking | 17 June 2024 | 1 | 2022 | | Runners-up (2022) |

== Format ==
The tournament competed in a knock-out format (quarterfinals, semifinals, and final), with the host country (Philippines) playing its quarterfinal match against the lowest ranked team. The remaining six teams were placed from 2nd to 7th positions as per the FIVB World Ranking as of 17 June 2024. Rankings are shown in brackets except the host.

| Match | Top ranker | Bottom ranker |
|---|---|---|
| Quarterfinal 1 | Philippines (Hosts) | Vietnam (34) |
| Quarterfinal 2 | Belgium (13) | Sweden (24) |
| Quarterfinal 3 | Puerto Rico (15) | Kenya (20) |
| Quarterfinal 4 | Czech Republic (16) | Argentina (17) |

== Venue ==
All matches
Manila, Philippines
Ninoy Aquino Stadium
Capacity: 6,000
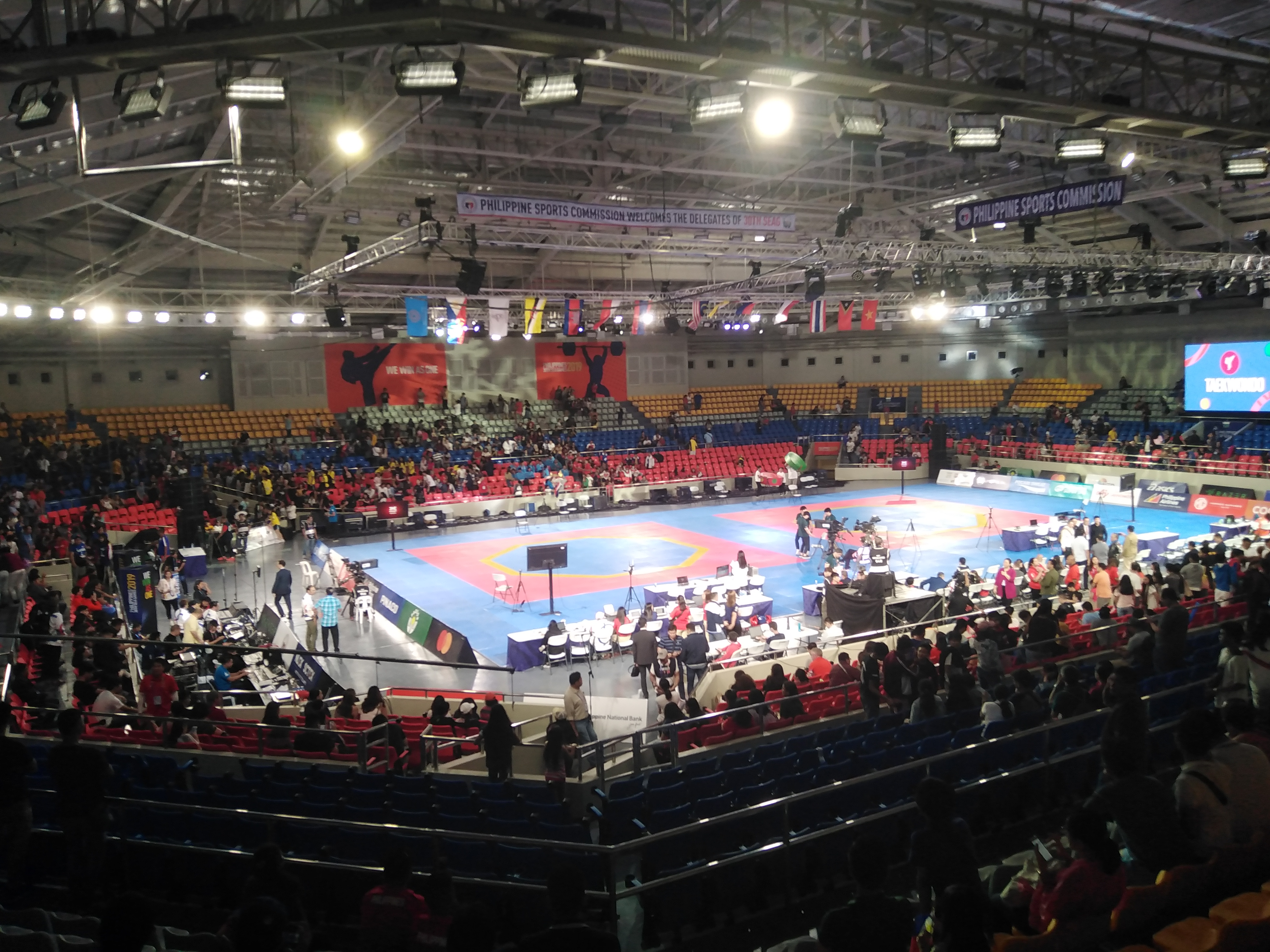

== Knockout stage ==
- All times are Philippine Standard Time (UTC+08:00).

Quarterfinals
5 July
Philippines | 0
Vietnam | 3
5 July
Czech Republic | 3
Argentina | 0
4 July
Belgium | 3
Sweden | 0
4 July
Puerto Rico | 3
Kenya | 0

Semifinals
6 July
Vietnam | 0
Czech Republic | 3
6 July
Belgium | 0
Puerto Rico | 3

Final
7 July
Czech Republic | 3
Puerto Rico | 1
3rd place match
7 July
Vietnam | 3
Belgium | 1

=== Quarterfinals ===
| Date | Time | | Score | | Set 1 | Set 2 | Set 3 | Set 4 | Set 5 | Total | Report |
|---|---|---|---|---|---|---|---|---|---|---|---|
| 4 Jul | 15:00 | Puerto Rico | 3–0 | Kenya | 25–20 | 25–19 | 27–25 | | | 77–64 | P2 Report |
| 4 Jul | 18:30 | Belgium | 3–0 | Sweden | 25–16 | 25–23 | 25–22 | | | 75–61 | P2 Report |
| 5 Jul | 15:00 | Czech Republic | 3–0 | Argentina | 25–15 | 25–22 | 25–16 | | | 75–53 | P2 Report |
| 5 Jul | 18:30 | Philippines | 0–3 | Vietnam | 14–25 | 22–25 | 21–25 | | | 57–75 | P2 Report |

=== Semifinals ===
| Date | Time | | Score | | Set 1 | Set 2 | Set 3 | Set 4 | Set 5 | Total | Report |
|---|---|---|---|---|---|---|---|---|---|---|---|
| 6 Jul | 15:00 | Belgium | 0–3 | Puerto Rico | 19–25 | 15–25 | 16–25 | | | 50–75 | P2 Report |
| 6 Jul | 18:30 | Vietnam | 0–3 | Czech Republic | 19–25 | 14–25 | 19–25 | | | 52–75 | P2 Report |

=== 3rd place match ===
| Date | Time | | Score | | Set 1 | Set 2 | Set 3 | Set 4 | Set 5 | Total | Report |
|---|---|---|---|---|---|---|---|---|---|---|---|
| 7 Jul | 15:00 | Vietnam | 3–1 | Belgium | 25–23 | 23–25 | 25–20 | 25–17 | | 98–85 | P2 Report |

=== Final ===
| Date | Time | | Score | | Set 1 | Set 2 | Set 3 | Set 4 | Set 5 | Total | Report |
|---|---|---|---|---|---|---|---|---|---|---|---|
| 7 Jul | 18:30 | Czech Republic | 3–1 | Puerto Rico | 25–23 | 25–20 | 18–25 | 25–18 | | 93–86 | P2 Report |

== Final standing ==
| Rank | Team |
|---|---|
| 1st place, gold medalist(s) | Czech Republic |
| 2nd place, silver medalist(s) | Puerto Rico |
| 3rd place, bronze medalist(s) | Vietnam |
| 4 | Belgium |
| 5 | Kenya |
| 6 | Sweden |
| 7 | Philippines |
| 8 | Argentina |

| Qualified for the 2025 Nations League |
| Qualified for the 2025 Nations League via FIVB World Ranking |

Source: VCC 2024 final standings

2024 Women's Challenger Cup champions

Czech Republic
1st title

14–woman Roster
Ema Kneiflová, Silvie Pavlová, Helena Havelková, Magdalena Bukovská, Ela Koulisiani, Daniela Digrinová, Kateřina Valková, Veronika Dostálová, Magdaléna Jehlářová, Michaela Mlejnková (c), Klára Faltínová, Květa Grabovská, Gabriela Orvošová, Monika Brancuská
Head coach
Ioannis Athanasopoulos

== See also ==
- 2024 FIVB Men's Volleyball Challenger Cup
- 2024 FIVB Women's Volleyball Nations League
