= Nikol Sajdová =

Czech volleyball player (born 1988)

Personal information
- Nationality: Czech
- Born: 20 July 1988 (age 38)
- Height: 185 cm (73 in)
- Weight: 79 kg (174 lb)
- Spike: 298 cm (117 in)
- Block: 295 cm (116 in)

Volleyball information
- Position: Middle-blocker
- Number: 14 (national team)

Career
Years	Teams
2015	Raben Vilsbiburg

National team
2015	Czech Republic

Nikol Sajdová (born 20 July 1988) is a Czech female volleyball player, playing as a middle-blocker. She is part of the Czech Republic women's national volleyball team.

She competed at the 2014 FIVB Volleyball World Grand Prix, and at the 2015 Women's European Volleyball Championship. On club level she plays for Raben Vilsbiburg.
