= Veronika Dostálová =

Czech volleyball player (born 1992)

Mgr. Veronika Dostálová
Personal information
- Nickname: Dosty
- Nationality: Czech
- Born: 7 April 1992 (age 34)
- Height: 170 cm (67 in)
- Weight: 67 kg (148 lb)
- Spike: 278 cm (109 in)
- Block: 269 cm (106 in)

Volleyball information
- Position: Libero
- Number: 11 (national team)

Career
- Years: Team
- 2015: PVK Olymp Praga
- 2017: VK Dukla Liberec

National team
- Years: Team
- 2015: Czech Republic
Honours
Women's volleyball
Representing Czech Republic
FIVB Challenger Cup
Gold medal – first place	2024 Manila

Veronika Dostálová (born 7 April 1992) is a Czech volleyball player, playing as a libero. She is part of the Czech Republic women's national volleyball team.

She competed at the 2014 FIVB Volleyball World Grand Prix, 2015 Women's European Volleyball Championship, and 2019 Women's European Volleyball League, winning a gold medal.

On club level she plays for VK Dukla Liberec.
