= Barbora Purchartová =

Czech volleyball player (born 1992)

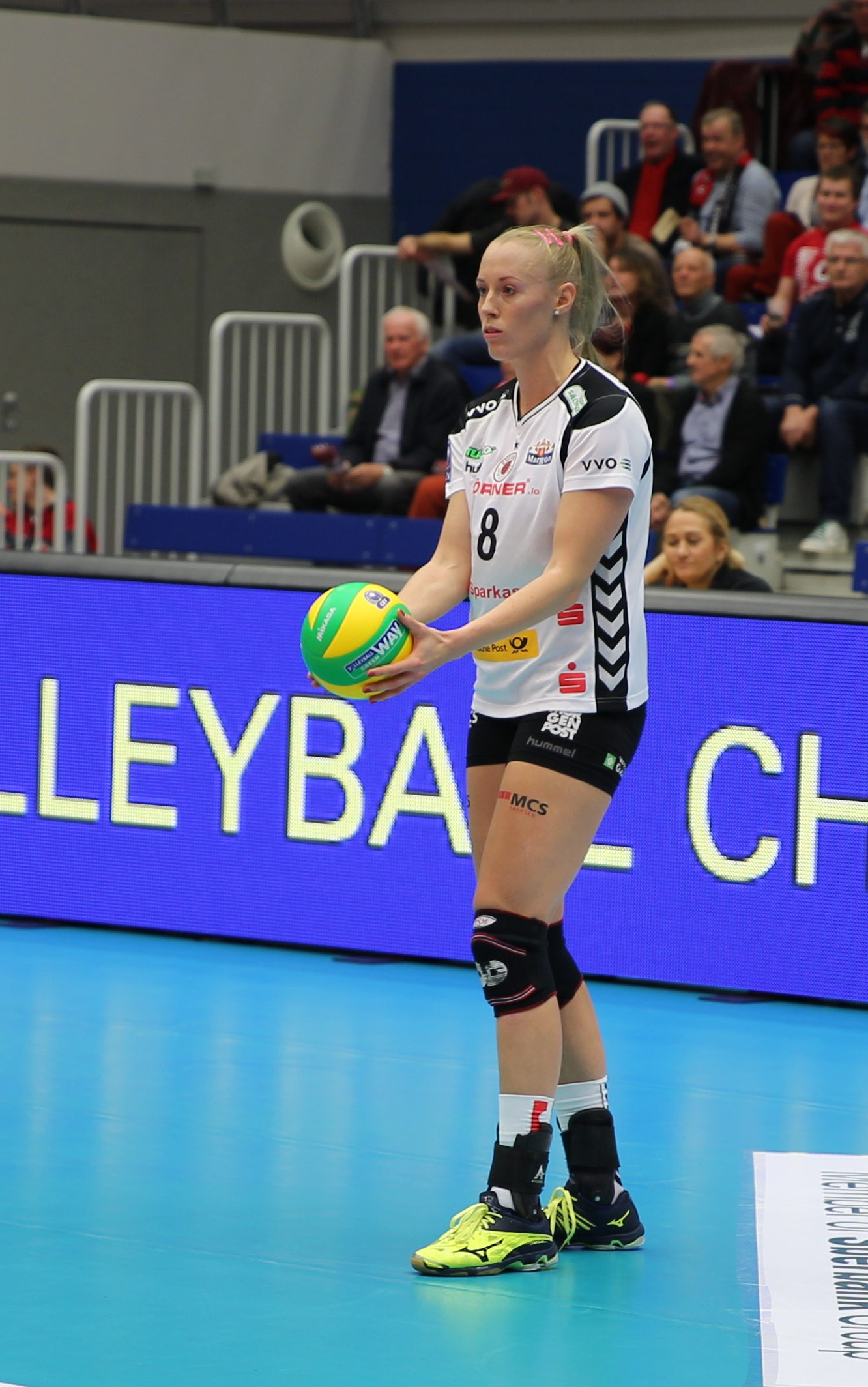
- Purchartová in 2016

Personal information
- Nationality: Czech
- Born: 9 May 1992 (age 34)
- Height: 189 cm (6 ft 2 in)
- Weight: 85 kg (187 lb)
- Spike: 309 cm (122 in)
- Block: 300 cm (118 in)

Volleyball information
- Position: Middle-blocker
- Number: 8 (national team)

Career
Years	Teams
2015	Dauphines Charleroi

National team
2015	Czech Republic

Barbora Purchartová (born 9 May 1992) is a Czech volleyball player, playing as a middle-blocker. She is part of the Czech Republic women's national volleyball team.

She competed at the 2015 Women's European Volleyball Championship. and 2019 Women's European Volleyball League, winning a gold medal.

On club level she plays for Dauphines Charleroi.
