= Eva Hodanová =

Czech volleyball player (born 1993)

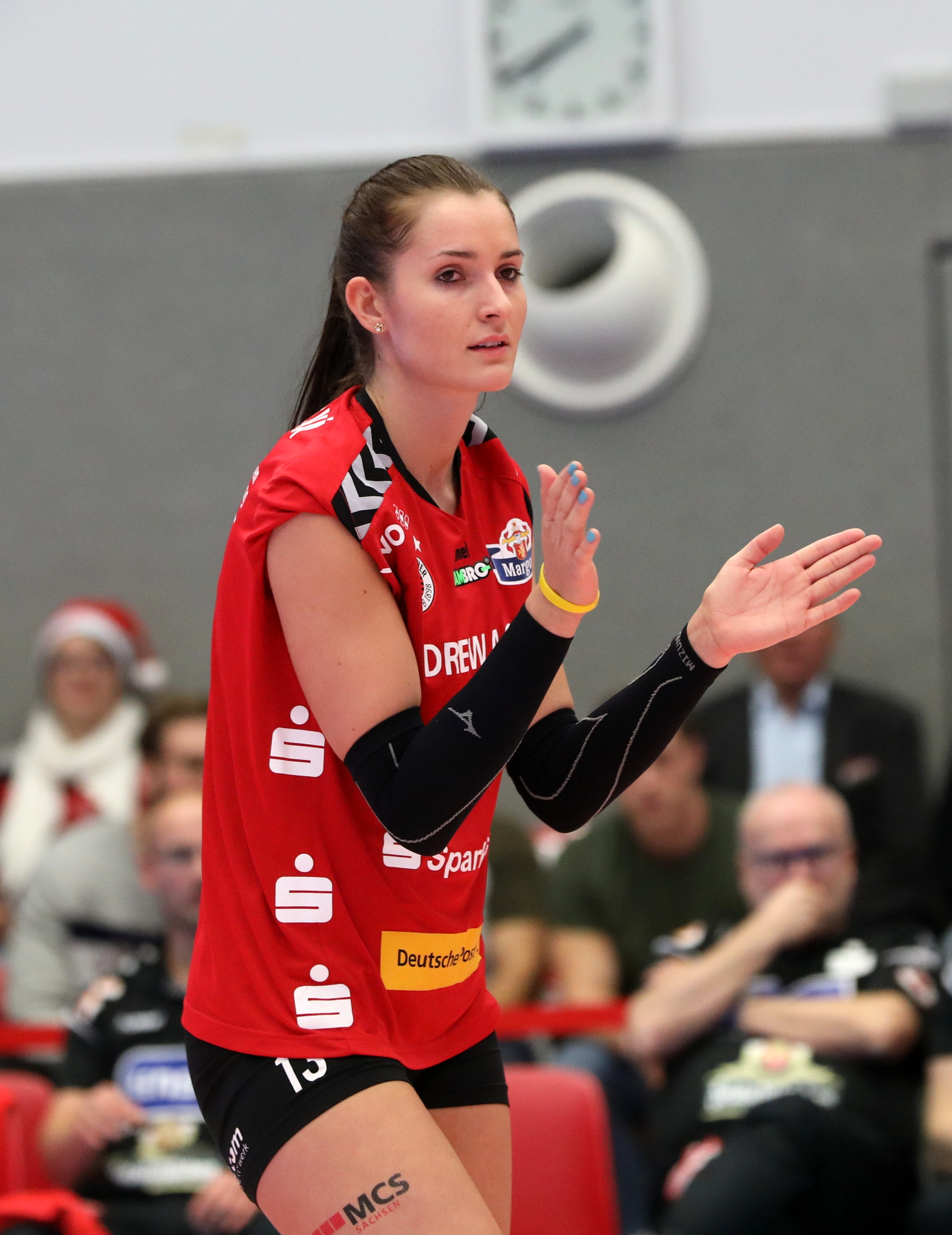

Personal information
- Nationality: Czech
- Born: 18 December 1993 (age 32)
- Height: 189 cm (74 in)
- Weight: 75 kg (165 lb)
- Spike: 306 cm (120 in)
- Block: 298 cm (117 in)

Volleyball information
- Position: Outside-spiker
- Number: 2 (national team)

Career
Years	Teams
2015	PVK Olymp Praga

National team
2015	Czech Republic

Eva Hodanová (born 18 December 1993) is a Czech female volleyball player, playing as an outside-spiker. She is part of the Czech Republic women's national volleyball team.

She competed at the 2015 Women's European Volleyball Championship. She competed in the 2015 FIVB Volleyball World Grand Prix. On club level she plays for PVK Olymp Praha.
