= Veronika Trnková =

Czech volleyball player (born 1995)

Personal information
- Nationality: Czech
- Born: 13 October 1995 (age 31)
- Height: 188 cm (74 in)
- Weight: 103 kg (227 lb)
- Spike: 309 cm (122 in)
- Block: 298 cm (117 in)

Volleyball information
- Position: Middle-blocker
- Current club: VK Prostějov
- Number: 3

Career
- Years: Team
- 2011–2015 2015–2016 2016–2018 2018–2020 2020–2021: PVK Olymp Praga; VfB Suhl LOTTO Thüringen; VK Prostějov; VK UP Olomouc; VK Dukla Liberec

National team
- Years: Team
- 2015–: Czech Republic

Veronika Trnková (born 13 October 1995) is a Czech volleyball player, playing as a middle-blocker. She plays for Czech club VK Prostějov and the Czech Republic women's national volleyball team.

She competed at the 2015 FIVB Volleyball World Grand Prix, 2015 Women's European Volleyball Championship. and 2019 Women's European Volleyball League, winning a gold medal.

On club level she plays for VfB 91 Suhl e.V.
