= Sweden women's national volleyball team =

Women's national volleyball team representing Sweden

Sweden
- Association: Svenska Volleybollförbundet
- Confederation: CEV
- Head coach: Lorenzo Micelli
- FIVB ranking: 26 (24 May 2026)

Uniforms
Home	Away

World Championship
- Appearances: 1 (First in 2025)
- Best result: 19th place (2025)

European Championship
- Appearances: 6 (First in 1967)
- Best result: 7th place (2026)
- www.volleyboll.se
Honours
Challenger Cup
Silver medal – second place	2023 Laval
European League
Gold medal – first place	2024 Ostrava
Gold medal – first place	2026 Ljubljana / Örebro
Silver medal – second place	2023 Piatra Neamt / Lund

The Sweden women's national volleyball team represents Sweden in international women's volleyball competitions and friendly matches.

== Results ==
=== World Championship ===
Champions Runners-up Third place Fourth place

World Championship record
Year	Round	Position	Pld	W	L	SW	SL	Squad
(Thailand) 2025	Preliminary round	19th place	3	1	2	5	7	Squad
(Canada) (United States) 2027	Qualified							
(Philippines) 2029	TBD							
Total	0 Titles	2/22	3	1	2	5	7	—

=== Challenger Cup ===
Champions Runners-up Third place Fourth place

Challenger Cup record
Year	Round	Position	Pld	W	L	SW	SL
(France) 2023	Final	Runners-up	3	2	1	7	6
(Philippines) 2024	Quarterfinals	6th place	1	0	1	0	3
Total	0 Title(s)		4	2	2	7	9

=== European Championship ===
Champions Runners-up Third place Fourth place

European Championship record
Year	Round	Position	Pld	W	L	SW	SL	Squad
(Czechoslovakia) 1949	Did not participate or qualify							
(Bulgaria) 1950	Did not participate or qualify							
(France) 1951	Did not participate or qualify							
(Romania) 1955	Did not participate or qualify							
(Czechoslovakia) 1958	Did not participate or qualify							
(Romania) 1963	Did not participate or qualify							
(Turkey) 1967	Final round	15th	9	0	9	1	27	Squad
(Italy) 1971	Final round	15th	7	3	4	10	14	Squad
(Socialist Federal Republic of Yugoslavia) 1975	Did not participate or qualify							
(Finland) 1977	Did not participate or qualify							
(France) 1979	Did not participate or qualify							
(Bulgaria) 1981	Did not participate or qualify							
(East Germany) 1983	Final round	12th	8	0	8	2	24	Squad
(Netherlands) 1985	Did not participate or qualify							
(Belgium) 1987	Did not participate or qualify							
(West Germany) 1989	Did not participate or qualify							
(Italy) 1991	Did not participate or qualify							
(Czech Republic) 1993	Did not participate or qualify							
(Netherlands) 1995	Did not participate or qualify							
(Czech Republic) 1997	Did not participate or qualify							
(Italy) 1999	Did not participate or qualify							
(Bulgaria) 2001	Did not participate or qualify							
(Turkey) 2003	Did not participate or qualify							
(Croatia) 2005	Did not participate or qualify							
(Belgium) (Luxembourg) 2007	Did not participate or qualify							
(Poland) 2009	Did not participate or qualify							
(Italy) (Serbia) 2011	Did not participate or qualify							
(Germany) (Switzerland) 2013	Did not participate or qualify							
(Netherlands) 2015	Did not participate or qualify							
(Azerbaijan) (Georgia (country)) 2017	Did not participate or qualify							
(Hungary) (Poland) (Slovakia) (Turkey) 2019	Did not participate or qualify							
(Bulgaria) (Croatia) (Romania) (Serbia) 2021	Quarterfinals	8th Place	7	3	4	9	16	Squad
(Belgium) (Italy) (Germany) (Estonia) 2023	Round of 16	16th Place	6	2	4	7	14	Squad
(Azerbaijan) (Czech Republic) (Sweden) (Turkey) 2026	Quarterfinals	7th Place	7	4	3	14	13	Squad
(Slovakia) (Spain) / (N/A) / (N/A) 2028	Qualified							
Total	0 titles	7/35	30	5	25	20	79	—

=== European Volleyball League ===
Champions Runners-up Third place Fourth place

European League record
Year	Round	Position	Pld	W	L	SW	SL	Squad
2009	Did not participate							
2010	Did not participate							
2011	Did not participate							
2012	Did not participate							
2013	Did not participate							
2014	Did not participate							
2015	Did not participate							
2016	Did not participate							
2017	Group stage	11th	6	1	5	5	17	Squad
2018	Silver League champions	13th	8	6	2	22	9	Squad
2019	Group stage	10th	6	0	6	1	18	Squad
2020	Cancelled							
2021	Did not participate							
2022	Silver League champions	10th	9	8	1	26	7	Squad
2023	Runners-up	2nd	8	5	3	16	15	Squad
2024	Champions	1st	8	6	2	18	12	Squad
2025	Semifinals	4th	8	5	3	17	12	Squad
2026	Champions	1st	10	10	0	30	8	Squad
Total	2 titles	8/17	63	41	22	135	98	—

== Team ==
=== Current squad ===
The Swedish roster in the 2025 World Championship.

Head Coach: (Italy) Lorenzo Micelli

No.	Player	Position	Height (m)	Birth date
2	Maya Tabron	Outside Hitter	1.79	16 February 2002 (age 24)
3	Linda Andersson	Middle Blocker	1.88	12 January 1998 (age 28)
8	Sonja Rundcrantz	Setter	1.70	15 December 2006 (age 19)
10	Isabelle Haak	Opposite	1.95	11 July 1999 (age 27)
11	Alexandra Lazić	Outside Hitter	1.88	24 September 1994 (age 31)
12	Hilda Gustafsson	Setter	1.85	25 December 2002 (age 23)
13	Filippa Brink	Libero	1.68	22 October 2001 (age 24)
15	Kirsten Van Leusen	Middle Blocker	1.90	15 February 1998 (age 28)
17	Anna Haak (c)	Outside Hitter	1.79	19 September 1996 (age 29)
18	Julia Nilsson	Middle Blocker	1.90	2 May 1997 (age 29)
20	Martha Edlund	Opposite	1.90	2 October 2006 (age 19)
22	Sabrina Phinizy	Outside Hitter	1.80	8 May 2003 (age 23)
23	Elsa Arrestad	Middle Blocker	1.84	26 December 1998 (age 27)
24	Elsa Nordin Ottosson	Libero	1.69	27 December 2007 (age 18)

=== Past squads ===
2021 European Championship — 8th place.

Head coach: (Italy) Ettore Guidetti

- 1 Elsa Arrestad (MB)
- 2 Sofia Andersson (S)
- 3 Linda Andersson (MB)
- 7 Sofie Sjöberg (L)
- 8 Dalila-Lilly Topic (MB)
- 9 Rebecka Lazić (OH)
- 10 Isabelle Haak (c) (OP)
- 11 Alexandra Lazić (OH)
- 14 Hanna Hellvig (OH)
- 15 Diana Lundvall (OH)
- 16 Vilma Julevik (S)
- 17 Anna Haak (OH)
- 18 Julia Nilsson (MB)
- 21 Gabriella Lundvall (L)

2023 European Championship — 16th place.

Head coach: (Finland) Jukka Lehtonen

- 1 Elsa Arrestad (MB)
- 3 Linda Andersson (MB)
- 4 Jonna Wasserfaller (c) (MB)
- 9 Rebecka Lazić (OH)
- 10 Isabelle Haak (OP)
- 11 Alexandra Lazić (OH)
- 12 Hilda Gustafsson (S)
- 13 Filippa Brink (L)
- 14 Hanna Hellvig (OH)
- 16 Vilma Julevik (S)
- 17 Anna Haak (OH)
- 18 Julia Nilsson (MB)
- 21 Elin Larsson (OP)
- 25 Emmy Andersson (L)

== See also ==
- Sweden men's national volleyball team
