= Helena Grozer =

Czech volleyball player

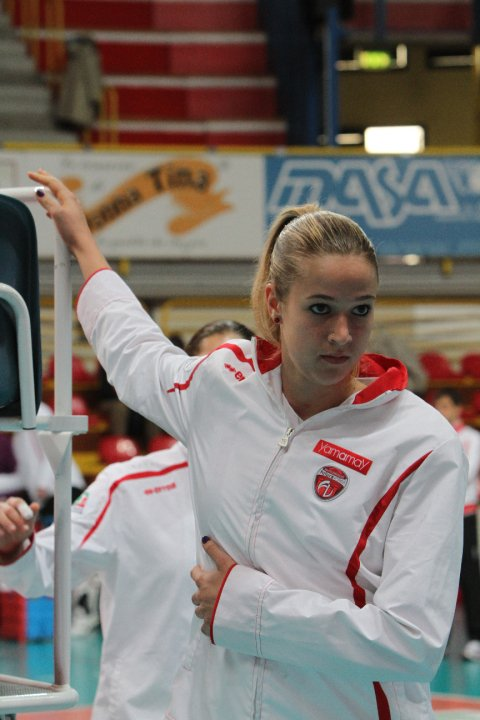

Personal information
- Nationality: Czech
- Born: Helena Havelková; 25 July 1988 (age 38); Frýdlant, Czechoslovakia
- Height: 1.88 m (6 ft 2 in)
- Weight: 64 kg (141 lb)
- Spike: 308 cm (121 in)
- Block: 295 cm (116 in)

National team
Czech Republic
Honours
Women's volleyball
Representing Czech Republic
FIVB Challenger Cup
Gold medal – first place	2024 Manila

Helena Grozer, née Havelková (born 25 July 1988) is a Czech volleyball player. She was a member of the Czech Republic women's national team. She competed at the 2014–15 CEV Women's Champions League in Szczecin, Poland, claiming the silver medal. She is married to György Grozer.

== Clubs ==
- (Czech Republic) VK TU Liberec (2003–2004)
- (Czech Republic) Slavia Prague (2004–2007)
- (Italy) Sassuolo Volley (2007–2009)
- (Italy) Yamamay Busto Arsizio (2009–2012)
- (Russia) Dinamo Krasnodar (2012–2013)
- (Turkey) Eczacıbaşı VitrA (2013–2014)
- (Italy) Yamamay Busto Arsizio (2014–2015)
- (Poland) KPS Chemik Police (2015–2016)
- (China) Shanghai (2016–2017)
- (Italy) Unione Sportiva ProVictoria Pallavolo Monza (2017–2018)
- (Russia) Dynamo Moscow (2018–2020)
- (Italy) Wealth Planet Perugia Volley (2020–2022)
- (Puerto Rico) Cangrejeras de Santurce (2023–2025)
- (Vietnam) Geleximco Hưng Yên (2025)

== Awards ==
=== Individuals ===
- 2011 European Volleyball League "Best scorer"
- 2012 European Volleyball League "Best receiver"
- 2014–15 CEV Women's Champions League "Best outside spiker"

=== Clubs ===
- 2009–10 Women's CEV Cup – Gold medal, with Yamamay Busto Arsizio
- 2011–12 Women's CEV Cup – Gold medal, with Yamamay Busto Arsizio
- 2014–15 CEV Women's Champions League – Silver medal, with Yamamay Busto Arsizio
