= 2023 FIVB Women's Volleyball Challenger Cup =

International volleyball tournament

Tournament details
- Host country: France
- City: Laval
- Dates: 27–30 July
- Teams: 8 (from 5 confederations)
- Venue: 1 (in 1 host city)

Final positions
- Champions: France (1st title)
- Runners-up: Sweden
- Third place: Colombia
- Fourth place: Ukraine

Tournament statistics
- Matches played: 8
- Attendance: 7,858 (982 per match)
- Best scorer: (Sweden) Isabelle Haak (92 points)
- Best attacker: (Sweden) Isabelle Haak (45.30%)
- Best spiker: (Sweden) Isabelle Haak (45.30%)
- Best blocker: (Ukraine) Anastasiia Maievska (3.00 Avg)
- Best server: (France) Nina Stojiljković (2.00 Avg)
- Best setter: (France) Nina Stojiljković (17.33 Avg)
- Best digger: (France) Héléna Cazaute (16.33 Avg)
- Best receiver: (Colombia) Amanda Coneo (24.51%)

The 2023 FIVB Women's Volleyball Challenger Cup was the fourth edition of the FIVB Volleyball Women's Challenger Cup, an annual women's international volleyball tournament contested by eight national teams that acts as a qualifier for the FIVB Women's Volleyball Nations League. The tournament was held at Espace Mayenne in Laval, France, between 27 and 30 July 2023.

Five teams made their first appearance in the women's Challenger Cup in this edition: Kenya, Mexico, Sweden, Ukraine and Vietnam.

The host France won the title, defeating Sweden in the final, and earned the right to participate in the 2024 Nations League replacing Croatia, the last placed challenger team in the 2023 edition. Colombia defeated Ukraine in the 3rd place match.

== Qualification ==
A total of 8 teams qualified for the tournament.

Country	Confederation	Qualified as	Qualified on	Previous appearances			Previous best performance
Country	Confederation	Qualified as	Qualified on	Total	First	Last	Previous best performance
Kenya	CAVB	Highest ranked in CAVB	—N/a	0	None		None
Colombia	CSV	Highest ranked in CSV	—N/a	2	2018	2022	Runners-up (2018)
France	CEV	Host country	1 June 2023	1	2022		5th place (2022)
Mexico	NORCECA	2022 NORCECA International League Final Four champions	19 June 2022	0	None		None
Vietnam	AVC	2023 Asian Challenge Cup champions	25 June 2023	0	None		None
Ukraine	CEV	2023 European Golden League champions	28 June 2023	0	None		None
Sweden	CEV	2023 European Golden League runners-up	28 June 2023	0	None		None
Croatia	CEV	2023 Nations League last placed challenger team	2 July 2023	2	2019	2022	Champions (2022)

== Format ==
The tournament will compete in the knock-out format (quarterfinals, semifinals, and final) with the host country (France) playing its quarterfinal match against the lowest ranked team. The remaining six teams are placed from 2nd to 7th positions as per the FIVB World Ranking as of 10 July 2023. Rankings are shown in brackets except the host.

Match	Top ranker	Bottom ranker
Quarterfinal 1	France (Hosts)	Vietnam (47)
Quarterfinal 2	Colombia (17)	Kenya (29)
Quarterfinal 3	Mexico (19)	Sweden (28)
Quarterfinal 4	Ukraine (20)	Croatia (25)

== Venue ==
All matches
Laval, France
Espace Mayenne
Capacity: 4,500

== Knockout stage ==
- All times are Central European Summer Time (UTC+02:00).

Quarterfinals
27 July
France	3
Vietnam	0
27 July
Ukraine	3
Croatia	1
28 July
Colombia	3
Kenya	1
28 July
Mexico	2
Sweden	3

Semifinals
29 July
France	3
Ukraine	0
29 July
Colombia	1
Sweden	3

Final
30 July
France	3
Sweden	1
3rd place match
30 July
Ukraine	1
Colombia	3

=== Quarterfinals ===
Date	Time		Score		Set 1	Set 2	Set 3	Set 4	Set 5	Total	Report
27 Jul	17:00	France	3–0	Vietnam	25–20	25–16	25–17			75–53	P2 Report
27 Jul	20:30	Ukraine	3–1	Croatia	25–15	25–15	18–25	25–19		93–74	P2 Report
28 Jul	17:00	Mexico	2–3	Sweden	25–20	25–19	20–25	22–25	5–15	97–104	P2 Report
28 Jul	20:30	Colombia	3–1	Kenya	25–22	21–25	25–23	25–19		96–89	P2 Report

=== Semifinals ===
Date	Time		Score		Set 1	Set 2	Set 3	Set 4	Set 5	Total	Report
29 Jul	17:00	France	3–0	Ukraine	25–10	25–20	25–22			75–52	P2 Report
29 Jul	20:30	Sweden	3–1	Colombia	25–17	25–17	22–25	25–17		97–76	P2 Report

=== 3rd place match ===
Date	Time		Score		Set 1	Set 2	Set 3	Set 4	Set 5	Total	Report
30 Jul	13:30	Ukraine	1–3	Colombia	23–25	25–12	24–26	22–25		94–88	P2 Report

=== Final ===
Date	Time		Score		Set 1	Set 2	Set 3	Set 4	Set 5	Total	Report
30 Jul	17:00	France	3–1	Sweden	25–21	25–16	22–25	25–15		97–77	P2 Report

== Final standing ==
Rank	Team
1st place, gold medalist(s)	France
2nd place, silver medalist(s)	Sweden
3rd place, bronze medalist(s)	Colombia
4	Ukraine
5	Mexico
6	Kenya
7	Croatia
8	Vietnam

Qualified for the 2024 Nations League

Source: VCC 2023 final standings

2023 Women's Challenger Cup champions

France
1st title

14–woman Roster
Héléna Cazaute (c), Amandine Giardino, Christina Bauer, Nina Stojiljković, Lucille Gicquel, Amandha Marine Sylves, Eva Brooklyn Elouga, Léandra Olinga-Andela, Émilie Respaut, Guewe Diouf, Amélie Rotar, Halimatou Bah, Sabine Haewegene, Juliette Gelin
Head coach
Émile Rousseaux

== See also ==
- 2023 FIVB Women's Volleyball Nations League
- 2023 FIVB Men's Volleyball Challenger Cup
