= Kateřina Valková =

Czech volleyball player (born 1996)

Personal information
- Nationality: Czech
- Born: 6 February 1996 (age 30); Plzeň, Czech Republic
- Height: 178 cm (5 ft 10 in)
- Weight: 59 kg (130 lb)
- Spike: 288 cm (113 in)
- Block: 275 cm (108 in)

Volleyball information
- Position: Setter
- Current club: (Germany) VfB 91 Suhl
- Number: 15

Career
Years	Teams
2013-2018; 2018-2019; 2019-	(Czech Republic) TJ Ostrava (Czech Republic) PVK Olymp Praha (Germany) VfB 91 Suhl
Honours
Women's volleyball
Representing Czech Republic
FIVB Challenger Cup
Gold medal – first place	2024 Manila

Kateřina Valková (born 6 February 1996) is a Czech volleyball player, a member of the German club VfB 91 Suhl.

== Sporting achievements ==
=== Clubs ===
Czech Championship:

- 2016, 2018

=== National team ===
European League:

- 2018
