= 2022 Women's European Volleyball League =

European volleyball tournament

2022 Women's European Golden League
- Dates: 24 May – 19 June
- Teams: 9

Final positions
- Champions: France (1st title)
- Runners-up: Czech Republic

Tournament awards
- MVP: (France) Lucille Gicquel

2022 Women's European Volleyball League
- Dates: 25 May – 2 July
- Teams: 5
- Runners-up: Portugal

The 2022 Women's European Volleyball League was the 13th edition of the annual Women's European Volleyball League, which featured women's national volleyball teams from 14 European countries. Ukraine was originally scheduled to host the Final Four tournament but due to 2022 Russian invasion of Ukraine there will be no host nation.

The tournament had two divisions: the Golden League, which featured nine teams, and the Silver League, which featured five teams.

== Pools composition ==
Teams were seeded following the Serpentine system according to their European Ranking for national teams as of September 2021. Rankings are shown in brackets.

=== Golden league ===
Pool A	Pool B	Pool C
~~Bulgaria (4)~~	Croatia (9)	~~Azerbaijan (11)~~
France (14)	Slovakia (13)	Ukraine (12)
Spain (15)	~~Belarus (16)~~	Romania (16)
Bosnia and Herzegovina (24)	Czech Republic (21)	Hungary (18)

=== Silver league ===
Pool A
Slovenia (23)
Sweden (25)
Portugal (26)
Estonia (27)
Luxembourg (39)

== Pool standing procedure ==
1. Total number of victories (matches won, matches lost)
2. In the event of a tie, the following first tiebreaker will apply: The teams will be ranked by the most point gained per match as follows:
  - Match won 3–0 or 3–1: 3 points for the winner, 0 points for the loser
  - Match won 3–2: 2 points for the winner, 1 point for the loser
  - Match forfeited: 3 points for the winner, 0 points (0–25, 0–25, 0–25) for the loser
3. If teams are still tied after examining the number of victories and points gained, then the FIVB will examine the results in order to break the tie in the following order:
  - Set quotient: if two or more teams are tied on the number of points gained, they will be ranked by the quotient resulting from the division of the number of all set won by the number of all sets lost.
  - Points quotient: if the tie persists based on the set quotient, the teams will be ranked by the quotient resulting from the division of all points scored by the total of points lost during all sets.
  - If the tie persists based on the point quotient, the tie will be broken based on the team that won the match of the Round Robin Phase between the tied teams. When the tie in point quotient is between three or more teams, these teams ranked taking into consideration only the matches involving the teams in question.

== League round ==
=== Golden league ===
- All times are local.

==== Pool A ====
Pos	Team	Pld	W	L	Pts	SW	SL	SR	SPW	SPL	SPR	Qualification
1	France	4	4	0	12	12	2	6.000	340	269	1.264	Golden league Final round
2	Bosnia and Herzegovina	4	1	3	3	6	9	0.667	337	345	0.977	
3	Spain	4	1	3	3	3	10	0.300	258	321	0.804	

Date	Time		Score		Set 1	Set 2	Set 3	Set 4	Set 5	Total	Report
25 May	20:00	France	3–0	Spain	25–13	25–17	25–18			75–48	Report
28 May	20:00	Bosnia and Herzegovina	1–3	Spain	24–26	23–25	25–21	23–25		95–97	Report
1 Jun	20:00	France	3–1	Bosnia and Herzegovina	25–17	25–20	22–25	25–19		97–81	Report
4 Jun	20:00	Bosnia and Herzegovina	1–3	France	25–18	18–25	19–25	23–25		85–93	Report
8 Jun	19:00	Spain	0–3	Bosnia and Herzegovina	16–25	18–25	24–26			58–76	Report
11 Jun	19:30	Spain	0–3	France	17–25	18–25	20–25			55–75	Report

==== Pool B ====
Pos	Team	Pld	W	L	Pts	SW	SL	SR	SPW	SPL	SPR	Qualification
1	Czech Republic	4	3	1	9	10	5	2.000	351	315	1.114	Golden league Final round
2	Croatia	4	3	1	8	9	6	1.500	332	325	1.022	Golden league Final round
3	Slovakia	4	0	4	1	4	12	0.333	338	381	0.887	

Date	Time		Score		Set 1	Set 2	Set 3	Set 4	Set 5	Total	Report
25 May	17:00	Croatia	0–3	Czech Republic	21–25	16–25	15–25			52–75	Report
28 May	17:00	Croatia	3–0	Slovakia	25–19	25–20	29–27			79–66	Report
1 Jun	17:00	Slovakia	1–3	Czech Republic	20–25	21–25	25–23	22–25		88–98	Report
4 Jun	19:00	Czech Republic	3–1	Slovakia	23–25	25–23	25–15	25–17		98–80	Report
8 Jun	16:30	Slovakia	2–3	Croatia	25–20	25–21	23–25	18–25	13–15	104–106	Report
11 Jun	19:00	Czech Republic	1–3	Croatia	25–20	23–25	20–25	12–25		80–95	Report

==== Pool C ====
Pos	Team	Pld	W	L	Pts	SW	SL	SR	SPW	SPL	SPR	Qualification
1	Romania	4	3	1	7	10	7	1.429	369	351	1.051	Golden league Final round
2	Ukraine	4	2	2	8	10	8	1.250	394	362	1.088	
3	Hungary	4	1	3	3	6	11	0.545	337	387	0.871	

Date	Time		Score		Set 1	Set 2	Set 3	Set 4	Set 5	Total	Report
24 May	17:00	Romania	3–2	Ukraine	25–15	22–25	19–25	25–21	15–12	106–98	Report
25 May	17:00	Ukraine	3–1	Romania	25–13	20–25	25–20	25–19		95–77	Report
28 May	18:00	Hungary	2–3	Romania	25–27	25–23	25–21	18–25	11–15	104–111	Report
2 Jun	18:00	Ukraine	3–1	Hungary	25–27	25–17	25–18	25–19		100–81	Report
4 Jun	18:00	Hungary	3–2	Ukraine	25–17	12–25	20–25	25–20	16–14	98–101	Report
8 Jun	17:00	Romania	3–0	Hungary	25–20	25–19	25–13			75–52	Report

==== Ranking of the second placed teams ====
Pos	Team	Pld	W	L	Pts	SW	SL	SR	SPW	SPL	SPR	Qualification
1	Croatia	4	3	1	8	9	6	1.500	332	325	1.022	Golden league Final round
2	Ukraine	4	2	2	8	10	8	1.250	394	362	1.088	
3	Bosnia and Herzegovina	4	1	3	3	6	9	0.667	337	345	0.977	

=== Silver league ===
- All times are local.

Pos	Team	Pld	W	L	Pts	SW	SL	SR	SPW	SPL	SPR	Qualification
1	Sweden	8	7	1	20	23	7	3.286	712	552	1.290	Silver league Final round
2	Portugal	8	6	2	17	21	11	1.909	745	652	1.143	Silver league Final round
3	Slovenia	8	4	4	12	14	15	0.933	612	632	0.968	
4	Estonia	8	3	5	11	16	17	0.941	706	715	0.987	
5	Luxembourg	8	0	8	0	0	24	0.000	376	600	0.627	

Date	Time		Score		Set 1	Set 2	Set 3	Set 4	Set 5	Total	Report
25 May	19:30	Slovenia	3–0	Luxembourg	25–23	25–12	25–14			75–49	Report
25 May	21:00	Portugal	3–2	Estonia	25–23	25–15	22–25	26–28	15–13	113–104	Report
28 May	19:30	Slovenia	0–3	Sweden	13–25	13–25	19–25			45–75	Report
29 May	16:00	Luxembourg	0–3	Estonia	19–25	21–25	16–25			56–75	Report
1 Jun	18:00	Portugal	3–0	Slovenia	25–21	25–14	25–22			75–57	Report
1 Jun	19:00	Luxembourg	0–3	Sweden	22–25	15–25	10–25			47–75	Report
4 Jun	15:00	Sweden	2–3	Portugal	22–25	25–21	18–25	25–21	13–15	103–107	Report
4 Jun	19:30	Slovenia	3–2	Estonia	25–18	18–25	23–25	25–22	15–11	106–101	Report
8 Jun	17:00	Estonia	2–3	Sweden	12–25	25–23	25–23	22–25	11–15	95–111	Report
8 Jun	21:00	Portugal	3–0	Luxembourg	25–12	25–13	25–21			75–46	Report
12 Jun	15:00	Sweden	3–0	Estonia	25–20	25–20	25–12			75–52	Report
12 Jun	17:00	Luxembourg	0–3	Portugal	8–25	15–25	15–25			38–75	Report
15 Jun	18:00	Estonia	3–2	Slovenia	27–25	25–20	25–27	23–25	15–10	115–107	Report
15 Jun	21:00	Portugal	2–3	Sweden	13–25	25–21	24–26	32–30	19–21	113–123	Report
18 Jun	15:00	Sweden	3–0	Luxembourg	25–11	25–13	25–14			75–38	Report
18 Jun	19:30	Slovenia	3–1	Portugal	26–24	25–23	16–25	25–20		92–92	Report
22 Jun	18:00	Sweden	3–0	Slovenia	25–19	25–20	25–16			75–55	Report
22 Jun	18:00	Estonia	3–0	Luxembourg	25–14	25–16	25–22			75–52	Report
26 Jun	17:00	Luxembourg	0–3	Slovenia	17–25	16–25	17–25			50–75	Report
26 Jun	17:00	Estonia	1–3	Portugal	25–20	23–25	22–25	19–25		89–95	Report

== Final round ==
=== Golden league ===
Semifinals
16 June – Prostějov
Czech Republic	3
Romania	2
16 June – Orléans
France	3
Croatia	0

Final
19 June – Orléans
France	3
Czech Republic	0

==== Semifinals ====
Date	Time		Score		Set 1	Set 2	Set 3	Set 4	Set 5	Total	Report
16 Jun	18:00	Czech Republic	3–2	Romania	25–22	23–25	25–22	21–25	15–11	109–105	Report
16 Jun	20:00	France	3–0	Croatia	25–16	25–17	25–13			75–46	Report

==== Final ====
Date	Time		Score		Set 1	Set 2	Set 3	Set 4	Set 5	Total	Report
19 Jun	18:00	France	3–0	Czech Republic	25–22	27–25	25–14			77–61	Report

=== Silver league ===
==== Final ====
Date	Time		Score		Set 1	Set 2	Set 3	Set 4	Set 5	Total	Report
2 Jul	15:00	Sweden	3–0	Portugal	25–19	25–21	25–16			75–56	Report

== Final standing ==
Rank	Team
1st place, gold medalist(s)	France
2nd place, silver medalist(s)	Czech Republic
3rd place, bronze medalist(s)	Romania
3rd place, bronze medalist(s)	Croatia
5	Ukraine
6	Bosnia and Herzegovina
7	Hungary
8	Spain
9	Slovakia
10	Sweden
11	Portugal
12	Slovenia
13	Estonia
14	Luxembourg

Qualified for the 2022 Challenger Cup
Qualified for the 2022 Challenger Cup as hosts
Qualified for the 2022 Challenger Cup as 1st CEV ranked team

2022 European League champions

France
1st title

14-man Roster for Golden League Final Round
Héléna Cazaute, Amandine Giardino (L), Manon Bernard (L), Nina Stojilkovic, Lucille Gicquel, Isaline Sager-Weider, Amandha Sylves, Eva Elouga, Léandra Olinga-Andela, Leïa Ratahiry, Émilie Respaut, Amélie Rotar, Halimatou Bah, Sabine Haewegene
Head coach
Emile Rousseaux

== Awards ==
- Most Valuable Player
  (France) Lucille Gicquel

== See also ==
- 2022 Men's European Volleyball League
