= Czech Republic women's national volleyball team =

Women's national volleyball team representing the Czech Republic

Czechia
- Association: Český volejbalový svaz
- Confederation: CEV
- Head coach: Giannis Athanasopoulos
- FIVB ranking: 15 (24 May 2026)

Uniforms
Home	Away

World Championship
- Appearances: 5 (First in 1994)
- Best result: 9th place (1994)

European Championship
- Appearances: 13 (First in 1995)
- Best result: (bronze) (1997)
- www.CVF.cz (in Czech)
Honours
Challenger Cup
Gold medal – first place	2024 Manila
Silver medal – second place	2019 Lima
European Championship
Bronze medal – third place	1997 Czech Republic
European League
Gold medal – first place	2012 Karlovy Vary
Gold medal – first place	2019 Varaždin
Silver medal – second place	2022 Orléans
Silver medal – second place	2024 Ostrava
Bronze medal – third place	2018 Budapest
Bronze medal – third place	2023 Piatra Neamt / Lund

The Czech Republic women's national volleyball team (Czech: České národní volejbalové družstvo žen) represents the Czech Republic in international women's volleyball competitions and friendly matches. The national team is organized by the Czech Volleyball Association ((Czech: Český volejbalový svaz; ČVS) which is a member of the Fédération Internationale de Volleyball (FIVB) as well the European Volleyball Confederation (CEV). The national federation is also a part of the Middle European Volleyball Zonal Association (MEVZA).

== Results ==
=== World Championship ===
- (Brazil) 1994 — 9th place
- (Germany) 2002 — 19th place
- (Japan) 2010 — 15th place
- (Netherlands) (Poland) 2022 — 18th place
- (Thailand) 2025 — 25th place

=== World Grand Prix ===
- (Japan) 2013 — 14th place
- (Bulgaria) 2014 — 22nd place (Group 3)
- (Poland) 2015 — 15th place (Group 2)
- (Bulgaria) 2016 — 18th place (Group 2)
- (Czech Republic) 2017 — 16th place (Group 2)

=== Nations League ===
- (Poland) 2025 — 11th place
- (Macau) 2026 — 10th place
- (N/A) 2027 — qualified

=== Challenger Cup ===
- (Peru) 2018 — Did not qualify
- (Peru) 2019 — 2nd
- (Croatia) 2022 — 6th place
- (France) 2023 — Did not qualify
- (Philippines) 2024 — 1st

=== European Championship ===
- 1997 — 3rd
- 1999 — Did not qualify
- 2001 — 9th place
- 2003 — 9th place
- 2005 — Did not qualify
- 2007 — 9th place
- 2009 — 10th place
- 2011 — 8th place
- 2013 — 10th place
- 2015 — 11th place
- 2017 — 12th place
- 2019 — Did not qualify
- 2021 — 15th place
- 2023 — 8th place
- 2026 — 11th place

=== European League ===
- 2011 — 4th place
- 2012 — 1st
- 2018 — 3rd
- 2019 — 1st
- 2021 — 4th place
- 2022 — 2nd
- 2023 — 3rd
- 2024 — 2nd

== Team ==
=== Current squad ===
The following is the Czech roster for the 2025 FIVB Women's World Championships

Head Coach: Ioannis Athanasopoulos

No.	Name	Date of birth	Pos	Height
1	Ema Kneiflová	22 June 2002	MB	190 cm (6 ft 3 in)
2	Eva Hodanová	18 December 1993	O	189 cm (6 ft 2 in)
3	Elen Jedličková	1 December 2005	MB	190 cm (6 ft 3 in)
4	Silvie Pavlová	20 May 1997	MB	182 cm (6 ft 0 in)
5	Eva Svobodová	6 May 1997	OH	181 cm (5 ft 11 in)
6	Helena Grozer	25 July 1988	OH	186 cm (6 ft 1 in)
7	Magdalena Bukovská	28 April 2003	OH	184 cm (6 ft 0 in)
8	Ela Koulisiani	1 October 2002	MB	188 cm (6 ft 2 in)
9	Daniela Digrinová	19 October 2000	L	169 cm (5 ft 7 in)
10	Kateřina Valková	6 February 1996	S	177 cm (5 ft 10 in)
11	Veronika Dostálová	7 April 1992	L	170 cm (5 ft 7 in)
13	Denisa Pavlíková	13 July 2001	OH	180 cm (5 ft 11 in)
14	Lucie Kolářová	2 September 2000	OH	189 cm (6 ft 2 in)
15	Magdaléna Jehlářová	16 January 2000	MB	189 cm (6 ft 2 in)
16	Michaela Mlejnková	26 July 1996	OH	185 cm (6 ft 1 in)
17	Klára Dítě	23 December 1997	OH	183 cm (6 ft 0 in)
18	Joséfina Smolková	11 April 2006	OH	187 cm (6 ft 2 in)
19	Kateřina Pelikánová	25 October 2004	S	177 cm (5 ft 10 in)
20	Květa Grabovská	29 May 2002	S	180 cm (5 ft 11 in)
23	Anna Pragerová	3 April 2006	S	178 cm (5 ft 10 in)
24	Anna Semanová	7 December 2006	O	193 cm (6 ft 4 in)
25	Monika Brancuská	19 November 2004	O	189 cm (6 ft 2 in)
27	Barbora Chaloupková	4 July 2003	L	172 cm (5 ft 8 in)
28	Eva Rejmanová	9 March 2008	OH	188 cm (6 ft 2 in)
29	Jana Fixová	4 August 2003	O	182 cm (6 ft 0 in)

=== Previous squads ===
The following is the Czech roster in the 2015 Women's European Volleyball Championship

Head coach: Carlo Parisi

No.	Name	Date of birth	Height	Weight	Spike	Block	2015 club
1	Andrea Kossanyiová	6 August 1993	1.85 m (6 ft 1 in)	72 kg (159 lb)	310 cm (120 in)	300 cm (120 in)	(Poland) Impel Wrocław
2	Eva Hodanová	18 December 1993	1.89 m (6 ft 2 in)	75 kg (165 lb)	306 cm (120 in)	298 cm (117 in)	(Czech Republic) PVK Olymp Praga
3	Veronika Trnková	13 October 1995	1.84 m (6 ft 0 in)	90 kg (200 lb)	302 cm (119 in)	299 cm (118 in)	(Czech Republic) PVK Olymp Praga
4	Aneta Havlíčková	3 July 1987	1.93 m (6 ft 4 in)	62 kg (137 lb)	295 cm (116 in)	280 cm (110 in)	(Azerbaijan) Lokomotiv Baku
5	Julie Jášová	14 September 1987	1.84 m (6 ft 0 in)	78 kg (172 lb)	305 cm (120 in)	293 cm (115 in)	(Czech Republic) VK Prostějov
6	Lucie Smutná	14 April 1991	1.81 m (5 ft 11 in)	75 kg (165 lb)	307 cm (121 in)	285 cm (112 in)	(Italy) Volley Soverato
8	Barbora Purchartová	9 May 1992	1.89 m (6 ft 2 in)	85 kg (187 lb)	309 cm (122 in)	300 cm (120 in)	(Belgium) Dauphines Charleroi
11	Veronika Dostálová	7 April 1992	1.70 m (5 ft 7 in)	67 kg (148 lb)	278 cm (109 in)	269 cm (106 in)	(Czech Republic) PVK Olymp Praha
12	Michaela Mlejnková	26 July 1996	1.84 m (6 ft 0 in)	70 kg (150 lb)	305 cm (120 in)	298 cm (117 in)	(Czech Republic) PVK Olymp Praha
13	Tereza Vanžurová	4 April 1991	1.86 m (6 ft 1 in)	74 kg (163 lb)	308 cm (121 in)	293 cm (115 in)	(Italy) Azzurra Volley San Casciano
14	Nikol Sajdová	20 July 1988	1.85 m (6 ft 1 in)	79 kg (174 lb)	298 cm (117 in)	295 cm (116 in)	(Germany) Raben Vilsbiburg
16	Helena Havelková (C)	25 July 1988	1.88 m (6 ft 2 in)	64 kg (141 lb)	308 cm (121 in)	295 cm (116 in)	(Italy) Yamamay Busto Arsizio
19	Pavla Vincourová	12 November 1992	1.80 m (5 ft 11 in)	62 kg (137 lb)	303 cm (119 in)	292 cm (115 in)	(Poland) Budowlani Łódź
20	Marie Toufarová	9 June 1992	1.83 m (6 ft 0 in)	70 kg (150 lb)	307 cm (121 in)	294 cm (116 in)	(Czech Republic) Královo Pole Brno

=== Notable players ===
In alphabetical order

- Anna Kallistova
- Helena Havelkova
- Helena Horka
- Kristýna Pastulová
- Markéta Chlumská
- Martina Utla
- Michaela Hasalíková
- Šárka Barborková
- Šárka Melichárková
- Tereza Vanzurova
