= 2019 Women's European Volleyball League =

European volleyball tournament

2019 Women's European League
Tournament details
- Host country: Croatia
- Dates: 25 May – 22 June
- Teams: 20

Final positions
- Champions: Czech Republic (2nd title)
- Runners-up: Croatia
- Third place: Belarus
- Fourth place: Spain

Tournament awards
- MVP: (Czech Republic) Andrea Kossányiová

The 2019 Women's European Volleyball League was the 11th edition of the annual Women's European Volleyball League, which features women's national volleyball teams from 20 European countries.

The tournament had two divisions: the Golden League, featuring twelve teams, and the Silver League, featuring eight teams.

It also acted as the European qualifying competition for the 2019 FIVB Volleyball Women's Challenger Cup, securing two vacancies (Czech Republic and Croatia) for the tournament that served as the qualifying competition for the 2020 FIVB Volleyball Women's Nations League. Winners of Silver League, Romania, qualified for 2020 edition of the Golden European League.

== Pools composition ==
Teams were seeded following the Serpentine system according to their European Ranking for national teams as of October 2018. Rankings are shown in brackets.

=== Golden league ===
Pool A	Pool B	Pool C
Czech Republic (10)	Croatia (11)	Belarus (12)
Ukraine (15)	Hungary (13)	Azerbaijan (13)
Slovakia (16)	France (16)	Finland (19)
Sweden (34)	Austria (24)	Spain (20)

=== Silver league ===
Pool A	Pool B
Romania (18)	Slovenia (20)
Georgia (25)	Portugal (22)
Israel (27)	Greece (28)
Cyprus (37)	Estonia (29)

== Pool standing procedure ==
1. Total number of victories (matches won, matches lost)
2. In the event of a tie, the following first tiebreaker will apply: The teams will be ranked by the most point gained per match as follows:
  - Match won 3–0 or 3–1: 3 points for the winner, 0 points for the loser
  - Match won 3–2: 2 points for the winner, 1 point for the loser
  - Match forfeited: 3 points for the winner, 0 points (0–25, 0–25, 0–25) for the loser
3. If teams are still tied after examining the number of victories and points gained, then the FIVB will examine the results in order to break the tie in the following order:
  - Set quotient: if two or more teams are tied on the number of points gained, they will be ranked by the quotient resulting from the division of the number of all set won by the number of all sets lost.
  - Points quotient: if the tie persists based on the set quotient, the teams will be ranked by the quotient resulting from the division of all points scored by the total of points lost during all sets.
  - If the tie persists based on the point quotient, the tie will be broken based on the team that won the match of the Round Robin Phase between the tied teams. When the tie in point quotient is between three or more teams, these teams ranked taking into consideration only the matches involving the teams in question.

== Golden league ==
- All times are local.

=== Pool A ===
Pos	Team	Pld	W	L	Pts	SW	SL	SR	SPW	SPL	SPR	Qualification
1	Czech Republic	6	4	2	13	14	8	1.750	515	431	1.195	Final round
2	Ukraine	6	4	2	12	14	6	2.333	462	392	1.179	
3	Slovakia	6	4	2	11	13	10	1.300	511	483	1.058	
4	Sweden	6	0	6	0	1	18	0.056	288	470	0.613	Relegated to the Silver League

Date	Time		Score		Set 1	Set 2	Set 3	Set 4	Set 5	Total	Report
25 May	17:00	Sweden	0–3	Czech Republic	10–25	14–25	16–25			40–75	Report
25 May	17:00	Ukraine	3–0	Slovakia	25–17	25–22	25–17			75–56	Report
29 May	16:00	Czech Republic	2–3	Slovakia	25–22	23–25	23–25	25–10	14–16	110–98	Report
29 May	18:00	Sweden	0–3	Ukraine	13–25	21–25	12–25			46–75	Report
1 Jun	15:00	Slovakia	3–0	Sweden	25–16	25–13	25–16			75–45	Report
1 Jun	16:00	Czech Republic	3–1	Ukraine	25–14	27–29	25–18	25–17		102–78	Report
8 Jun	16:00	Ukraine	3–0	Czech Republic	25–14	25–21	25–18			75–53	Report
8 Jun	17:00	Sweden	1–3	Slovakia	17–25	25–20	14–25	13–25		69–95	Report
12 Jun	17:00	Ukraine	3–0	Sweden	25–10	25–10	25–17			75–37	Report
12 Jun	20:00	Slovakia	1–3	Czech Republic	21–25	25–22	17–25	26–28		89–100	Report
15 Jun	15:30	Slovakia	3–1	Ukraine	27–25	21–25	25–20	25–14		98–84	Report
15 Jun	18:00	Czech Republic	3–0	Sweden	25–11	25–20	25–20			75–51	Report

=== Pool B ===
Pos	Team	Pld	W	L	Pts	SW	SL	SR	SPW	SPL	SPR	Qualification
1	Croatia (Note: Qualified as hosts) (H)	6	5	1	14	17	8	2.125	583	521	1.119	Final round
2	Hungary	6	4	2	13	15	9	1.667	543	512	1.061	
3	Austria	6	2	4	6	9	15	0.600	516	534	0.966	
4	France	6	1	5	3	8	17	0.471	509	585	0.870	

(H) Host
Notes:

Date	Time		Score		Set 1	Set 2	Set 3	Set 4	Set 5	Total	Report
25 May	15:00	Hungary	3–1	France	23–25	25–16	25–20	25–19		98–80	Report
26 May	15:30	Austria	2–3	Croatia	26–24	28–26	19–25	24–26	13–15	110–116	Report
29 May	19:00	Croatia	3–1	Hungary	25–21	22–25	25–17	25–21		97–84	Report
29 May	20:00	France	2–3	Austria	25–23	25–21	17–25	20–25	14–16	101–110	Report
1 Jun	18:00	France	1–3	Hungary	19–25	23–25	25–19	21–25		88–94	Report
1 Jun	19:00	Croatia	3–0	Austria	25–21	25–19	25–21			75–61	Report
8 Jun	15:00	Hungary	2–3	Croatia	15–25	25–20	22–25	25–23	10–15	97–108	Report
9 Jun	17:55	Austria	3–1	France	25–13	21–25	25–23	25–11		96–72	Report
12 Jun	17:55	Austria	0–3	Hungary	25–27	16–25	16–25			57–77	Report
12 Jun	20:00	France	3–2	Croatia	25–21	23–25	19–25	25–22	21–19	113–112	Report
15 Jun	15:00	Hungary	3–1	Austria	18–25	25–16	25–18	25–23		93–82	Report
15 Jun	19:00	Croatia	3–0	France	25–18	25–17	25–20			75–55	Report

=== Pool C ===
Pos	Team	Pld	W	L	Pts	SW	SL	SR	SPW	SPL	SPR	Qualification
1	Belarus	6	6	0	16	18	6	3.000	582	470	1.238	Final round
2	Spain	6	4	2	13	15	8	1.875	511	494	1.034	Final round
3	Finland	6	2	4	5	8	15	0.533	492	537	0.916	
4	Azerbaijan	6	0	6	2	6	18	0.333	505	589	0.857	

Date	Time		Score		Set 1	Set 2	Set 3	Set 4	Set 5	Total	Report
25 May	16:00	Finland	1–3	Spain	17–25	20–25	25–21	20–25		82–96	Report
26 May	17:00	Belarus	3–2	Azerbaijan	25–13	21–25	25–10	26–28	19–17	116–93	Report
29 May	17:00	Belarus	3–0	Finland	25–22	25–20	25–17			75–59	Report
29 May	18:00	Azerbaijan	0–3	Spain	21–25	24–26	14–25			59–76	Report
1 Jun	17:00	Belarus	3–1	Spain	17–25	25–13	25–8	27–25		94–71	Report
2 Jun	18:00	Azerbaijan	1–3	Finland	17–25	16–25	25–19	22–25		80–94	Report
8 Jun	18:00	Azerbaijan	1–3	Belarus	21–25	19–25	28–26	34–36		102–112	Report
8 Jun	19:30	Spain	3–1	Finland	25–23	25–19	22–25	26–24		98–91	Report
12 Jun	16:30	Finland	0–3	Belarus	17–25	16–25	18–25			51–75	Report
12 Jun	19:30	Spain	3–0	Azerbaijan	25–12	26–24	25–22			76–58	Report
15 Jun	15:00	Finland	3–2	Azerbaijan	25–19	29–27	27–29	19–25	15–13	115–113	Report
15 Jun	19:00	Spain	2–3	Belarus	11–25	23–25	26–24	25–21	9–15	94–110	Report

== Silver league ==
- All times are local.

=== Pool A ===
Pos	Team	Pld	W	L	Pts	SW	SL	SR	SPW	SPL	SPR	Qualification
1	Romania	6	5	1	16	17	3	5.667	485	345	1.406	Final round
2	Israel	6	5	1	14	15	7	2.143	502	465	1.080	
3	Cyprus	6	2	4	6	7	12	0.583	397	430	0.923	
4	Georgia	6	0	6	0	1	18	0.056	330	474	0.696	

Date	Time		Score		Set 1	Set 2	Set 3	Set 4	Set 5	Total	Report
25 May	17:00	Romania	3–0	Georgia	25–14	25–15	25–20			75–49	Report
25 May	19:00	Cyprus	1–3	Israel	18–25	19–25	27–25	19–25		83–100	Report
29 May	18:30	Israel	3–0	Georgia	25–18	25–23	25–17			75–58	Report
2 Jun	19:30	Israel	3–2	Romania	25–17	32–30	20–25	12–25	15–11	104–108	Report
4 Jun	19:30	Cyprus	3–0	Georgia	25–10	25–19	25–19			75–48	Report
8 Jun	17:00	Romania	3–0	Israel	25–14	25–15	25–21			75–50	Report
8 Jun	19:00	Georgia	0–3	Cyprus	24–26	14–25	17–25			55–76	Report
12 Jun	17:00	Romania	3–0	Cyprus	25–22	25–13	25–15			75–50	Report
12 Jun	19:00	Georgia	1–3	Israel	23–25	14–25	25–23	17–25		79–98	Report
15 Jun	19:00	Georgia	0–3	Romania	8–25	15–25	19–25			42–75	Report
15 Jun	19:30	Israel	3–0	Cyprus	25–22	25–20	25–20			75–62	Report
18 Jun	19:30	Cyprus	0–3	Romania	15–25	11–25	25–27			51–77	Report

=== Pool B ===
Pos	Team	Pld	W	L	Pts	SW	SL	SR	SPW	SPL	SPR	Qualification
1	Slovenia	6	5	1	15	17	6	2.833	538	479	1.123	Final round
2	Greece	6	4	2	13	14	9	1.556	520	470	1.106	
3	Estonia	6	2	4	4	8	16	0.500	501	544	0.921	
4	Portugal	6	1	5	4	9	17	0.529	515	581	0.886	

Date	Time		Score		Set 1	Set 2	Set 3	Set 4	Set 5	Total	Report
25 May	18:00	Portugal	0–3	Greece	20–25	17–25	19–25			56–75	Report
25 May	20:00	Slovenia	3–0	Estonia	25–18	25–22	25–23			75–63	Report
29 May	15:00	Portugal	2–3	Estonia	25–17	17–25	25–23	25–27	13–15	105–107	Report
29 May	16:30	Greece	0–3	Slovenia	19–25	24–26	21–25			64–76	Report
1 Jun	16:30	Greece	3–1	Portugal	15–25	25–14	25–19	25–19		90–77	Report
2 Jun	17:00	Estonia	0–3	Slovenia	23–25	21–25	24–26			68–76	Report
8 Jun	17:00	Estonia	1–3	Greece	8–25	23–25	25–21	13–25		69–96	Report
8 Jun	18:00	Portugal	3–2	Slovenia	25–27	25–22	25–23	22–25	15–9	112–106	Report
12 Jun	16:30	Greece	3–1	Estonia	27–29	25–18	25–20	26–24		103–91	Report
12 Jun	20:00	Slovenia	3–1	Portugal	27–25	25–15	23–25	25–15		100–80	Report
15 Jun	17:00	Estonia	3–2	Portugal	25–15	25–11	22–25	16–25	15–13	103–89	Report
15 Jun	20:00	Slovenia	3–2	Greece	25–21	25–15	20–25	20–25	15–6	105–92	Report

== Final round ==
- All times are Central European Summer Time (UTC+02:00).

=== Golden league ===
Semifinals
21 June
Czech Republic	3
Belarus	1
21 June
Croatia	3
Spain	1

Final
22 June
Czech Republic	3
Croatia	1
3rd place match
22 June
Belarus	3
Spain	0

==== Semifinals ====
Date	Time		Score		Set 1	Set 2	Set 3	Set 4	Set 5	Total	Report
21 Jun	16:00	Czech Republic	3–1	Belarus	25–16	25–15	23–25	26–24		99–80	Report
21 Jun	19:00	Croatia	3–1	Spain	25–21	25–22	23–25	25–20		98–88	Report

==== 3rd place match ====
Date	Time		Score		Set 1	Set 2	Set 3	Set 4	Set 5	Total	Report
22 Jun	16:00	Belarus	3–0	Spain	26–24	25–17	25–18			76–59	Report

==== Final ====
Date	Time		Score		Set 1	Set 2	Set 3	Set 4	Set 5	Total	Report
22 Jun	19:00	Czech Republic	3–1	Croatia	18–25	25–15	25–22	25–22		93–84	Report

=== Silver league ===
==== Final ====
Team 1	Agg.	Team 2	1st leg	2nd leg	Golden Set
Slovenia	3–3	Romania	3–1	0–3	12–15

===== Leg 1 =====
Date	Time		Score		Set 1	Set 2	Set 3	Set 4	Set 5	Total	Report
25 Jun	19:30	Slovenia	3–1	Romania	25–19	22–25	25–21	25–22		97–87	Report

===== Leg 2 =====
Date	Time		Score		Set 1	Set 2	Set 3	Set 4	Set 5	Total	Report
28 Jun	17:00	Romania	3–0	Slovenia	25–22	25–14	25–17			75–53	Report

== Final standing ==
Rank	Team
1st place, gold medalist(s)	Czech Republic
2nd place, silver medalist(s)	Croatia
3rd place, bronze medalist(s)	Belarus
4	Spain
5	Hungary
5	Ukraine
7	Austria
7	Finland
7	Slovakia
10	Azerbaijan
10	France
10	Sweden
13	Romania
14	Slovenia
15	Greece
15	Israel
17	Cyprus
17	Estonia
19	Georgia
19	Portugal

Qualified for the 2019 Challenger Cup

2019 European League champions

Czech Republic
2nd title

14-woman Roster for Golden League Final Round
Andrea Kossányiová, Veronika Trnková, Gabriela Orvošová, Eva Svobodová, Barbora Purchartová, Veronika Dostálová, Michaela Mlejnková, Tereza Patočková, Nikola Vaňková, Pavla Šmídová, Kristýna Šustrová, Eva Rutarová, Simona Kopecká, Kateřina Holásková
Head coach
Ioannis Athanasopoulos

== Awards ==
- Most Valuable Player
  (Czech Republic) Andrea Kossányiová

== See also ==
- 2019 Men's European Volleyball League
