= Wilmarie Rivera =

Puerto Rican volleyball player (born 1997)

Personal information
- Full name: Wilmarie Rivera Roldan
- Nationality: Puerto Rican
- Born: February 14, 1997 (age 29) Carolina, Puerto Rico
- Education: Pennsylvania State University; University of Louisville
- Height: 178 cm (5 ft 10 in)
- Weight: 58 kg (128 lb)
- Spike: 294 cm (116 in)
- Block: 288 cm (113 in)

Volleyball information
- Position: Setter
- Current team: Kuzeyboru
- Number: 12

Career
- Years: Team
- 2015–2017; 2017–2019; 2019–2020; 2019–2020; 2020–2022; 2021–2022; 2022–2023; 2023–2024; 2024–2025; 2025–2026; 2026–: Penn State Nittany Lions; Louisville Cardinals; Amazonas de Trujillo Alto; Hylte/Halmstad; Valencianas de Juncos; Volley-Ball Club Chamalières; Rote Raben Vilsbiburg; Orlando Valkyries; Columbus Fury; Cangrejeras de Santurce; Kuzeyboru

National team
- Years: Team
- 2011-2013: Puerto Rico U18
- 2013: Puerto Rico U20
- 2013-: Puerto Rico
Honours
Women's volleyball
Representing Puerto Rico
Central American and Caribbean Games
Bronze medal – third place	2026 Santo Domingo	Team

Wilmarie Rivera Roldan (born February 14, 1997) is a professional volleyball player who plays as a setter for the Turkish Women's Volleyball League team Kuzeyboru, and the Puerto Rico national team.

== Early years ==
Rivera started playing volleyball at the age of eight. She continued playing during her education at Saint Francis High School. She captained the school team four years long and was the "Most Valuable Player". Additionally, she performed athletics and softball.

In 2015, she started to play as a setter for the college volleyball team Penn State Nittany Lions. In her first year, she appeared in twenty matches, seeing action in 50 sets totaling 78 digs, 27 assists and six aces. In 2017, after changing her college, she played for Louisville Cardinals.

== Club career ==
Returned home, Rivera joined the senior team of Amazonas de Trujillo Alto, and debuted in January 2019. After her first season in the Liga de Voleibol Superior Femenino (LVSF) of Puerto Rico, she was honored with the "Rookie of Year" and "Setter of the Year" awards, winning both recognitions the second time after 2011. She played for Valencianas de Juncos in her country, and then she was with Volley-Ball Club Chamalières in France and Rote Raben Vilsbiburg in Germany before she joined Orlando Valkyries in Florida, United States. After playing for Orlando Valkyries in 2024, she transferred to Columbus Fury in Ohio, U.S. for the 2025 season.

Rivera returned to the island to join Cangrejeras de Santurce the 2026 season. The Puerto Rican Volleyball Federation selected her as the "Comeback Player of the Year for the Women's Superior Volleyball League (LVSF) 2026".

In June 2026, she moved to Turkey, and signed a deal with the Aksaray-based club Kuzeyboru to play in the topflight Turkish Women's Volleyball League.

== International career ==
=== Women's U18 team ===
Rivera was part of the Puerto Rico women's U18 national team at the 2013 Women's U18 Pan-American Volleyball Cup. She won the silver medal and was named the 1Best Setter". The same year, she won th bronze medal at the 2013 Girls' Youth NORCECA Volleyball Championshipe.

=== Women's senior team ===
As a member of the women's national team, she played at the 2023 Women’s NORCECA International League Final Four in Juana Díaz, Puerto Rico, and earned the MVP award. She won the silver medal at the 2024 FIVB Women's Volleyball Challenger Cup in Manila, Philippines. She was named the MVP of the 2025 Women's NORCECA Final Four in Manatí, Puerto Rico, where she contributed with eight points, four aces and four kills, in the gold medal match against Mexico. The same year, she played at the three matches of the 2025 FIVB Women's Volleyball World Championship Pool C in Chiang Mai, Thailand. Rivera won the bronze medal at the 2026 Central American and Caribbean Games with her national team.

== Personal life ==
Wilmarie Rivera Roldan was born to Esmeralda and Wilmar Rivera in Carolina, Puerto Rico on February 14, 1997. She has two brothers, Wilmar and William, who are both baseball players in Puerto Rico.

She completed her secondary education at Saint Francis High School. In 2015, she entered Pennsylvania State University for majoring in business administration. After two years, she moved to University of Louisville in 2017.

== Honours ==
=== International ===
Puerto Rico women's national volleyball team

(gold) (1): 2025 NORCECA
(silver) (2):2023 Central American and Caribbean Games, 2024 FIVB Women's Volleyball Challenger Cup
(bronze) (1): 2013 Women's NORCECA Volleyball Championship

=== Individual ===
Most Valuable Player (2)

2024 NORCECA Challenger Cup qualification
2025 NORCECA Final Four

Best Setter (4)

2013 Girls' Youth Pan-American Volleyball Cup
2018–19 Puero Rican Women's Volleyball League
2024 NORCECA Final Four
2026 NORCECA Final Four

Best Server (5)

2019 Women's Pan-American Volleyball Cup
2024 AVC Women's Challenge Cup
2024 NORCECA Final Four
2024 Summer Olympics qualification
2024 FIVB Women's Volleyball Challenger Cup
