= 2011 Women's European Volleyball League =

European volleyball tournament

Tournament details
- Host country: Turkey
- Dates: May 27 – July 10 (qualification); July 15/16 (final four)
- Teams: 12
- Venue: 1 (in 1 host city)

Final positions
- Champions: Serbia (3rd title)

Tournament awards
- MVP: Jovana Brakočević (SRB)

The 2011 Women's European Volleyball League was the third edition of the annual Women's European Volleyball League, which featured Women's national volleyball teams from twelve European countries: Belarus, Bulgaria, Croatia, Czech Republic, France, Greece, Hungary, Israel, Romania, Serbia, Spain, and Turkey. A preliminary league round was played from May 25 to July 10, and the final four tournament, which was held at Istanbul, Turkey, on 15/16 July.

During the league round, competing nations were drawn into two pools of four teams, and played each other in a double round-robin system, with two matches per leg in a total of six legs. Pool winners qualified for the final four round, joining the host team. If the final four host team finished first in its league round pool, the best pool runners-up qualified for the final four.

12 teams participated in this year's edition, which was a record field.

== Competing nations ==
- Belarus
- Bulgaria
- Croatia
- Czech Republic
- France
- Greece
- Hungary
- Israel
- Romania
- Serbia
- Spain
- Turkey

== League round ==
=== Pool A ===
Pos	Team	Pld	W	L	Pts	SW	SL	SR	SPW	SPL	SPR	Qualification
1	Serbia	12	12	0	35	36	4	9.000	976	724	1.348	Semi-finals
2	France	12	7	5	21	25	19	1.316	976	939	1.039	
3	Spain	12	4	8	14	17	26	0.654	884	959	0.922	
4	Greece	12	1	11	2	6	35	0.171	766	980	0.782	

==== Leg 1 ====
Date	Time		Score		Set 1	Set 2	Set 3	Set 4	Set 5	Total	Report
27 May	18:00	Serbia	3–0	Greece	25–11	25–14	25–15			75–40	Report
27 May	19:30	Spain	3–1	France	17–25	25–20	25–23	25–18		92–86	Report
28 May	17:30	Serbia	3–0	Greece	25–14	25–21	25–22			75–57	Report
28 May	18:00	Spain	0–3	France	23–25	19–25	18–25			60–75	Report

==== Leg 2 ====
Date	Time		Score		Set 1	Set 2	Set 3	Set 4	Set 5	Total	Report
3 June	19:30	Spain	0–3	Serbia	22–25	18–25	24–26			64–76	Report
3 June	20:00	France	3–0	Greece	25–15	25–10	25–22			75–47	Report
4 June	18:00	Spain	0–3	Serbia	17–25	20–25	17–25			54–75	Report
4 June	20:00	France	3–0	Greece	28–26	25–21	25–15			78–62	Report

==== Leg 3 ====
Date	Time		Score		Set 1	Set 2	Set 3	Set 4	Set 5	Total	Report
11 June	16:30	Greece	3–2	Spain	25–20	20–25	25–7	22–25	15–12	107–89	Report
11 June	17:00	Serbia	3–2	France	25–13	19–25	19–25	25–22	17–15	105–100	Report
12 June	16:30	Greece	1–3	Spain	21–25	21–25	25–22	18–25		85–97	Report
12 June	18:00	Serbia	3–0	France	25–16	25–16	25–17			75–49	Report

==== Leg 4 ====
Date	Time		Score		Set 1	Set 2	Set 3	Set 4	Set 5	Total	Report
17 June	18:00	Spain	3–0	Greece	26–24	25–18	25–11			76–53	Report
17 June	20:30	France	0–3	Serbia	21–25	21–25	18–25			60–75	Report
18 June	18:00	Spain	3–0	Greece	25–21	26–24	25–10			76–55	Report
18 June	20:30	France	1–3	Serbia	18–25	25–23	21–25	24–26		88–99	Report

==== Leg 5 ====
Date	Time		Score		Set 1	Set 2	Set 3	Set 4	Set 5	Total	Report
25 June	16:30	Greece	1–3	France	18–25	25–22	21–25	17–25		81–97	Report
25 June	20:00	Serbia	3–1	Spain	25–14	21–25	25–9	25–10		96–58	Report
26 June	16:30	Greece	1–3	France	20–25	25–17	17–25	23–25		85–92	Report
26 June	20:00	Serbia	3–0	Spain	25–17	25–21	25–22			75–60	Report

==== Leg 6 ====
Date	Time		Score		Set 1	Set 2	Set 3	Set 4	Set 5	Total	Report
8 July	20:30	France	3–2	Spain	25–17	13–25	23–25	25–22	15–7	101–96	Report
9 July	16:30	Greece	0–3	Serbia	11–25	16–25	22–25			49–75	Report
9 July	18:00	France	3–0	Spain	25–21	25–21	25–20			75–62	Report
10 July	16:30	Greece	0–3	Serbia	10–25	23–25	12–25			45–75	Report

=== Pool B ===
Pos	Team	Pld	W	L	Pts	SW	SL	SR	SPW	SPL	SPR	Qualification
1	Bulgaria	12	10	2	29	32	13	2.462	1066	934	1.141	Semi-finals
2	Czech Republic	12	9	3	27	31	14	2.214	1063	930	1.143	Semi-finals
3	Hungary	12	4	8	10	17	31	0.548	972	1110	0.876	
4	Israel	12	1	11	6	10	31	0.323	937	1064	0.881	

==== Leg 1 ====
Date	Time		Score		Set 1	Set 2	Set 3	Set 4	Set 5	Total	Report
27 May	16:00	Israel	3–1	Hungary	25–18	25–15	18–25	25–21		93–79	Report
27 May	18:00	Czech Republic	3–1	Bulgaria	16–25	25–21	25–21	25–21		91–88	Report
28 May	18:00	Czech Republic	1–3	Bulgaria	25–18	20–25	26–28	26–28		97–99	Report
28 May	19:00	Israel	1–3	Hungary	22–25	25–27	25–19	22–25		94–96	Report

==== Leg 2 ====
Date	Time		Score		Set 1	Set 2	Set 3	Set 4	Set 5	Total	Report
3 June	16:00	Israel	0–3	Czech Republic	19–25	13–25	24–26			56–76	Report
3 June	19:00	Hungary	1–3	Bulgaria	21–25	19–25	25–22	23–25		88–97	Report
4 June	19:00	Hungary	0–3	Bulgaria	19–25	16–25	23–25			58–75	Report
4 June	19:00	Israel	0–3	Czech Republic	16–25	21–25	16–25			53–75	Report

==== Leg 3 ====
Date	Time		Score		Set 1	Set 2	Set 3	Set 4	Set 5	Total	Report
10 June	15:00	Czech Republic	3–0	Hungary	25–11	25–14	27–25			77–50	Report
10 June	17:30	Bulgaria	3–2	Israel	20–25	22–25	25–23	25–23	15–11	107–107	Report
11 June	14:00	Czech Republic	2–3	Hungary	19–25	25–18	24–26	28–26	16–18	112–113	Report
11 June	17:30	Bulgaria	3–0	Israel	25–22	25–19	25–16			75–57	Report

==== Leg 4 ====
Date	Time		Score		Set 1	Set 2	Set 3	Set 4	Set 5	Total	Report
17 June	16:00	Israel	1–3	Bulgaria	13–25	25–22	21–25	24–26		83–98	Report
17 June	19:00	Hungary	0–3	Czech Republic	19–25	15–25	27–29			61–79	Report
18 June	15:00	Hungary	2–3	Czech Republic	15–25	25–20	25–13	17–25	14–16	96–99	Report
18 June	19:00	Israel	0–3	Bulgaria	20–25	21–25	7–25			48–75	Report

==== Leg 5 ====
Date	Time		Score		Set 1	Set 2	Set 3	Set 4	Set 5	Total	Report
24 June	17:30	Bulgaria	3–1	Hungary	25–17	23–25	25–18	25–18		98–78	Report
24 June	20:00	Czech Republic	3–1	Israel	17–25	25–15	25–20	25–20		92–80	Report
25 June	17:30	Bulgaria	3–0	Hungary	25–15	25–11	25–16			75–42	Report
25 June	18:00	Czech Republic	3–0	Israel	30–28	25–11	25–16			80–55	Report

==== Leg 6 ====
Date	Time		Score		Set 1	Set 2	Set 3	Set 4	Set 5	Total	Report
8 July	17:30	Bulgaria	1–3	Czech Republic	26–28	12–25	25–18	20–25		83–96	Report
8 July	19:00	Hungary	3–2	Israel	14–25	25–27	25–19	25–22	15–8	104–101	Report
9 July	17:30	Bulgaria	3–1	Czech Republic	19–25	27–25	25–20	25–19		96–89	Report
9 July	19:00	Hungary	3–2	Israel	23–25	17–25	25–22	25–23	17–15	107–110	Report

=== Pool C ===
Pos	Team	Pld	W	L	Pts	SW	SL	SR	SPW	SPL	SPR	Qualification
1	Turkey	12	10	2	30	32	8	4.000	983	831	1.183	Semi-finals
2	Romania	12	8	4	22	24	19	1.263	974	927	1.051	
3	Belarus	12	5	7	16	22	25	0.880	1032	1056	0.977	
4	Croatia	12	1	11	4	7	33	0.212	791	866	0.913	

==== Leg 1 ====
Date	Time		Score		Set 1	Set 2	Set 3	Set 4	Set 5	Total	Report
27 May	20:30	Romania	3–0	Croatia	25–12	25–22	25–14			75–48	Report
28 May	18:00	Romania	3–1	Croatia	25–11	20–25	25–19	25–15		95–70	Report
28 May	19:30	Turkey	3–1	Belarus	25–15	23–25	25–19	25–21		98–80	Report
29 May	19:30	Turkey	3–0	Belarus	26–24	26–24	29–27			81–75	Report

==== Leg 2 ====
Date	Time		Score		Set 1	Set 2	Set 3	Set 4	Set 5	Total	Report
4 June	17:00	Belarus	3–0	Croatia	25–19	29–27	25–18			79–64	Report
4 June	18:30	Turkey	3–0	Romania	25–13	25–20	25–19			75–52	Report
5 June	17:00	Belarus	3–0	Croatia	25–12	25–23	25–23			75–58	Report
5 June	18:30	Turkey	3–0	Romania	25–20	28–26	25–22			78–68	Report

==== Leg 3 ====
Date	Time		Score		Set 1	Set 2	Set 3	Set 4	Set 5	Total	Report
10 June	19:30	Croatia	0–3	Turkey	16–25	22–25	23–25			61–75	Report
11 June	17:00	Belarus	2–3	Romania	25–20	19–25	25–22	16–25	13–15	98–107	Report
11 June	20:15	Croatia	0–3	Turkey	15–25	23–25	14–25			52–75	Report
12 June	17:00	Belarus	0–3	Romania	21–25	17–25	26–28			64–78	Report

==== Leg 4 ====
Date	Time		Score		Set 1	Set 2	Set 3	Set 4	Set 5	Total	Report
17 June	20:30	Romania	3–1	Turkey	23–25	25–21	25–22	25–22		98–90	Report
18 June	20:15	Croatia	2–3	Belarus	20–25	20–25	25–22	25–23	11–15	101–110	Report
18 June	20:30	Romania	0–3	Turkey	17–25	23–25	16–25			56–75	Report
19 June	19:30	Croatia	1–3	Belarus	17–25	25–17	19–25	17–25		78–92	Report

==== Leg 5 ====
Date	Time		Score		Set 1	Set 2	Set 3	Set 4	Set 5	Total	Report
25 June	17:00	Belarus	1–3	Turkey	25–20	15–25	21–25	19–25		80–95	Report
25 June	17:30	Croatia	0–3	Romania	25–27	21–25	24–26			70–78	Report
26 June	17:00	Belarus	3–1	Turkey	25–23	27–25	20–25	25–18		97–91	Report
26 June	19:00	Croatia	3–0	Romania	27–25	25–23	25–14			77–62	Report

==== Leg 6 ====
Date	Time		Score		Set 1	Set 2	Set 3	Set 4	Set 5	Total	Report
8 July	19:00	Turkey	3–0	Croatia	25–22	25–18	25–20			75–60	Report
8 July	20:30	Romania	3–2	Belarus	25–27	25–14	20–25	26–24	15–7	111–97	Report
9 July	19:00	Turkey	3–0	Croatia	25–19	25–17	25–16			75–52	Report
9 July	20:30	Romania	3–1	Belarus	17–25	25–17	25–18	27–25		94–85	Report

== Final four ==
The final four will be held at Istanbul, Turkey on July 15/16, 2011.

Qualified teams

- Bulgaria
- Czech Republic
- Serbia
- Turkey (host)

Semi-finals
July 15 – Istanbul
Serbia	3
Czech Republic	0
July 15 – Istanbul
Turkey	3
Bulgaria	0

Final
July 16 – Istanbul
Serbia	3
Turkey	0
3rd place
July 16 – Istanbul
Czech Republic	0
Bulgaria	3

=== Semifinals ===
Date	Time		Score		Set 1	Set 2	Set 3	Set 4	Set 5	Total	Report
15 July	17:00	Serbia	3–0	Czech Republic	25–18	25–17	25–22			75–57	Report
15 July	19:30	Turkey	3–0	Bulgaria	25–18	25–21	25–18			75–57	Report

=== Bronze medal match ===
Date	Time		Score		Set 1	Set 2	Set 3	Set 4	Set 5	Total	Report
16 July	16:30	Czech Republic	0–3	Bulgaria	21–25	26–28	23–25			70–78	Report

=== Final ===
Date	Time		Score		Set 1	Set 2	Set 3	Set 4	Set 5	Total	Report
16 July	19:00	Serbia	3–0	Turkey	25–17	25–21	25–23			75–61	Report

== Final standing ==
Rank	Team
1st place, gold medalist(s)	Serbia
2nd place, silver medalist(s)	Turkey
3rd place, bronze medalist(s)	Bulgaria
4	Czech Republic
5	Romania
6	France
7	Belarus
8	Spain
9	Hungary
10	Israel
11	Croatia
12	Greece

2011 Women's European League winners

Serbia
Third title

== Awards ==
- MVP: (Serbia) Jovana Brakočević
- Best scorer: (Czech Republic) Helena Havelková
- Best spiker: (Serbia) Jovana Brakočević
- Best server: (Turkey) Eda Erdem
- Best setter: (Serbia) Maja Ognjenović
- Best libero: (Turkey) Gizem Güreşen
- Best receiver: (Czech Republic) Šárka Barborková
