= 2022 FIVB Women's Volleyball Challenger Cup =

International volleyball tournament

Tournament details
- Host country: Croatia
- City: Zadar
- Dates: 28–31 July
- Teams: 8 (from 5 confederations)
- Venue: 1 (in 1 host city)

Final positions
- Champions: Croatia (1st title)
- Runners-up: Belgium
- Third place: Puerto Rico
- Fourth place: Colombia

Tournament statistics
- Matches played: 8
- Attendance: 5,932 (742 per match)
- Best scorer: (Belgium) Britt Herbots (80 points)
- Best spiker: (Belgium) Britt Herbots (36.92%)
- Best blocker: (Croatia) Božana Butigan (4.67 Avg)
- Best server: (Belgium) Britt Herbots (2.33 Avg)
- Best setter: (Belgium) Jutta Van De Vyver (8.00 Avg)
- Best digger: (Croatia) Lucija Mlinar (1.33 Avg)
- Best receiver: (Croatia) Laura Miloš (36.99%)

The 2022 FIVB Women's Volleyball Challenger Cup was the third edition of the FIVB Women's Volleyball Challenger Cup, an annual women's international volleyball tournament contested by eight national teams that acts as a qualifier for the FIVB Women's Volleyball Nations League. The tournament was held at Krešimir Ćosić Hall in Zadar, Croatia, between 28 and 31 July 2022.

Four teams made their first appearance in the women's Challenger Cup in this edition: Belgium, Cameroon, France and Kazakhstan.

Croatia won the title, defeating Belgium in the final, and earned the right to participate in the 2023 Nations League replacing Belgium, the last placed challenger team in the 2022 edition. Puerto Rico defeated Colombia in the 3rd place match.

== Qualification ==
A total of eight teams qualified for the tournament.

Country	Confederation	Qualified as	Qualified on	Previous appearances			Previous best performance
Country	Confederation	Qualified as	Qualified on	Total	First	Last	Previous best performance
Cameroon	CAVB	1st World ranked team from CAVB	31 March 2022	0	None		None
Colombia	CSV	1st World ranked team from CSV	31 March 2022	1	2018		Runners-up (2018)
Kazakhstan	AVC	1st World ranked team from AVC	31 March 2022	0	None		None
Puerto Rico	NORCECA	1st World ranked team from NORCECA	31 March 2022	1	2018		3rd place (2018)
Croatia	CEV	Host country	8 April 2022	1	2019		4th place (2019)
Czech Republic	CEV	1st World ranked team from CEV	19 June 2022	1	2019		Runners-up (2019)
France	CEV	2022 Golden League champions	19 June 2022	0	None		None
Belgium	CEV	2022 Nations League last placed challenger team	3 July 2022	0	None		None

== Format ==
The tournament will compete in a knock-out phase (quarterfinals, semifinals, and final), with the host country (Croatia) playing its quarterfinal match against the lowest ranked team among the participating teams. The remaining seven teams are placed from 2nd to 8th positions as per the FIVB World Ranking as of 3 July 2022. Rankings are shown in brackets except the hosts.

Match	Top ranker	Bottom ranker
Quarterfinal 1	Croatia (Hosts)	Kazakhstan (36)
Quarterfinal 2	Belgium (12)	Czech Republic (23)
Quarterfinal 3	Colombia (17)	France (22)
Quarterfinal 4	Puerto Rico (18)	Cameroon (20)

== Rule changes ==
1. Court switch at the end of the sets to be eliminated due to COVID-19 safety guidelines and for a better television broadcasts.
2. Each team is allowed to call only one time-out during each set in the preliminary. The time-out lasts 30 seconds long. During the finals, each team is granted one time-out before the technical and one time-out after the technical, except in a fifth set.
3. Only one technical time-out is made when the leading team reaches 12 points, but no technical in a fifth set.

== Venue ==
All matches
Zadar, Croatia
Krešimir Ćosić Hall
Capacity: 8,500
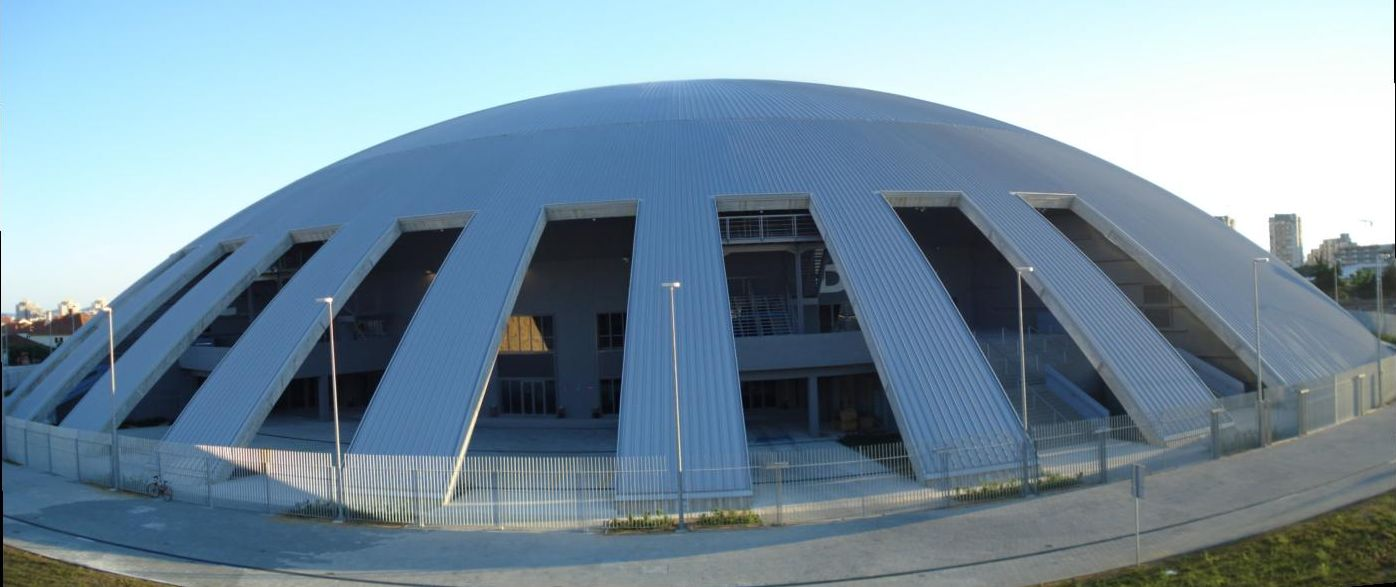

== Knockout stage ==
- All times are Central European Summer Time (UTC+02:00).

Quarterfinals
28 July – Zadar
Croatia	3
Kazakhstan	0
29 July – Zadar
Puerto Rico	3
Cameroon	0
28 July – Zadar
Belgium	3
Czech Republic	0
29 July – Zadar
Colombia	3
France	2

Semifinals
30 July – Zadar
Croatia	3
Puerto Rico	1
30 July – Zadar
Belgium	3
Colombia	1

Final
31 July – Zadar
Croatia	3
Belgium	1
3rd place match
31 July – Zadar
Puerto Rico	3
Colombia	1

=== Quarterfinals ===
Date	Time		Score		Set 1	Set 2	Set 3	Set 4	Set 5	Total	Report
28 Jul	17:00	Belgium	3–0	Czech Republic	25–18	25–23	25–15			75–56	P2 Report
28 Jul	20:00	Croatia	3–0	Kazakhstan	25–20	25–15	25–20			75–55	P2 Report
29 Jul	17:00	Colombia	3–2	France	25–17	25–16	22–25	11–25	16–14	99–97	P2 Report
29 Jul	20:00	Puerto Rico	3–0	Cameroon^{A}	25–0	25–0	25–0			75–0	Report

=== Semifinals ===
Date	Time		Score		Set 1	Set 2	Set 3	Set 4	Set 5	Total	Report
30 Jul	17:00	Belgium	3–1	Colombia	21–25	25–20	25–21	25–16		96–82	P2 Report
30 Jul	20:00	Croatia	3–1	Puerto Rico	26–24	25–17	23–25	25–17		99–83	P2 Report

=== 3rd place match ===
Date	Time		Score		Set 1	Set 2	Set 3	Set 4	Set 5	Total	Report
31 Jul	17:00	Puerto Rico	3–1	Colombia	27–25	23–25	25–23	25–18		100–91	P2 Report

=== Final ===
Date	Time		Score		Set 1	Set 2	Set 3	Set 4	Set 5	Total	Report
31 Jul	20:00	Croatia	3–1	Belgium	25–20	21–25	25–22	25–21		96–88	P2 Report

== Final standing ==
Rank	Team
1st place, gold medalist(s)	Croatia
2nd place, silver medalist(s)	Belgium
3rd place, bronze medalist(s)	Puerto Rico
4	Colombia
5	France
6	Czech Republic
7	Kazakhstan
8	Cameroon

Qualified for the 2023 Nations League

Source: VCC 2022 final standings

2022 Women's Challenger Cup champions

Croatia
1st title

14–woman Roster
Mika Grbavica, Ema Strunjak, Božana Butigan, Klara Perić, Laura Miloš, Lucija Mlinar, Dijana Karatović, Beta Dumančić, Josipa Marković, Samanta Fabris (c), Martina Šamadan, Lea Deak, Izabela Štimac, Natalia Tomić
Head coach
Ferhat Akbaş

== See also ==
- 2022 FIVB Women's Volleyball Nations League
- 2022 FIVB Men's Volleyball Challenger Cup
- 2022 FIVB Men's Volleyball Nations League

== Notes ==
A.Cameroon withdrew and forfeited their match against Puerto Rico from the competition because they could not acquire entry visas to Croatia.
