= FIVB Women's Volleyball Challenger Cup =

International women's volleyball competition for national teams

- Most recent season or competition: 2024 FIVB Women's Volleyball Challenger Cup
- Sport: Volleyball
- Founded: 2017; 9 years ago
- First season: 2018
- Folded: 2024
- CEO: (Brazil) Ary Graça
- No. of teams: 8
- Continent: International (FIVB)
- Last champions: Czech Republic (1st title)
- Most titles: Bulgaria; Canada; Croatia; Czech Republic; France (1 title each)
- Streaming partner: Volleyball TV
- Promotion to: Nations League
- Website: Volleyball Challenger Cup

The FIVB Women's Volleyball Challenger Cup was an international volleyball competition contested by the senior women's national teams of the members of the Fédération Internationale de Volleyball (FIVB), the sport's global governing body. The Challenger Cup served as a qualifying tournament for the Volleyball Nations League (VNL), with the winner earning the right to participate in the following year's VNL.

A corresponding tournament for men's national teams was the FIVB Men's Volleyball Challenger Cup.

== History ==
The Challenger Cup was first announced in October 2017 (alongside the announcement of the Nations League) as a joint project between the FIVB, the IMG and 21 national federations. The inaugural tournament was played between 20 and 24 June 2018 in Lima, Peru. Bulgaria won the tournament, defeating Colombia in the final and qualified for the 2019 Nations League.

The 2020 and 2021 editions of the Challenger Cup were canceled due to the COVID-19 pandemic. When the tournament returned in 2022, it had a new knockout formula and the number of participating teams had increased from six to eight.

In 2024, FIVB announced that the world ranking would replace the Challenger Cup as the qualifier for the 2026 Nations League and the tournament was discontinued.

== Format ==
=== 2018–2019 ===
The six qualified teams play in 2 pools of 3 teams in a round-robin format. The top 2 teams of each pool qualify for the semifinals. The first ranked teams play against the second ranked teams in this round. The winners of the semifinals advance to compete for the Challenger Cup title. The champion team will qualify for the next year's Nations League as a challenger team.

=== 2022–2024 ===
The eight qualified teams play in a knockout stage format. The top four teams in the quarterfinals will qualify for the semifinals. The winner of the quarterfinal 1 will play a semifinal match against the winner of the quarterfinal 4 and the winner of the quarterfinal 2 will play a semifinal match against the winner of the quarterfinal 3. The winners of the semifinals will advance to compete for the Challenger Cup title. The champion team will qualify for the next year's Nations league as a challenger team.

== Qualification ==
Confederation	Slots
AVC (Asia)	1
CAVB (Africa)	1
CSV (South America)	1
CEV (Europe)	2
NORCECA (North America)	1
Total	8 (6+H+VNL)

== Hosts ==
List of hosts by number of final cups hosted.

Times hosted	Hosts	Year(s)
2	Peru	2018, 2019
1	Croatia	2022
1	France	2023
1	Philippines	2024

== Appearance ==
Legend

- 1st – Champions
- 2nd – Runners-up
- 3rd – Third place
- 4th – Fourth place
- • – Did not enter / Did not qualify
- – Hosts
- Q – Qualified for forthcoming tournament

Team	(Peru); 2018 (6)	(Peru); 2019 (6)	(Croatia); 2022 (8)	(France); 2023 (8)	(Philippines); 2024 (8)	Total
Argentina	•	3rd	•	•	8th	2
Australia	5th	•	•	•	•	1
Belgium	•	•	2nd	•	4th	2
Bulgaria	1st	•	•	•	•	1
Cameroon	•	•	8th	•	•	1
Canada	•	1st	•	•	•	1
Chinese Taipei	•	6th	•	•	•	1
Colombia	2nd	•	4th	3rd	•	3
Croatia	•	4th	1st	7th	•	3
Czech Republic	•	2nd	6th	•	1st	3
France	•	•	5th	1st	•	2
Hungary	5th	•	•	•	•	1
Kazakhstan	•	•	7th	•	•	1
Kenya	•	•	•	6th	5th	2
Mexico	•	•	•	5th	•	1
Peru	4th	5th	•	•	•	2
Philippines	•	•	•	•	7th	1
Puerto Rico	3rd	•	3rd	•	2nd	3
Sweden	•	•	•	2nd	6th	2
Ukraine	•	•	•	4th	•	1
Vietnam	•	•	•	8th	3rd	2

== Results summary ==
Year	Host	Final			3rd place match			Teams
Year	Host	Champions	Score	Runners-up	3rd place	Score	4th place	Teams
2018; Details	(Peru); Lima	Bulgaria	3–1	Colombia	Puerto Rico	3–2	Peru	6
2019; Details	(Peru); Lima	Canada	3–2	Czech Republic	Argentina	3–0	Croatia	6
2020	(Croatia); Zadar	Canceled due to COVID-19 pandemic						
2021	(Croatia); Zadar	Canceled due to COVID-19 pandemic						
2022; Details	(Croatia); Zadar	Croatia	3–1	Belgium	Puerto Rico	3–1	Colombia	8
2023; Details	(France); Laval	France	3–1	Sweden	Colombia	3–1	Ukraine	8
2024; Details	(Philippines); Manila	Czech Republic	3–1	Puerto Rico	Vietnam	3–1	Belgium	8

== Medals summary ==
Rank	Nation	Gold	Silver	Bronze	Total
1	Czech Republic	1	1	0	2
2	Bulgaria	1	0	0	1
2	Canada	1	0	0	1
2	Croatia	1	0	0	1
2	France	1	0	0	1
6	Puerto Rico	0	1	2	3
7	Colombia	0	1	1	2
8	Belgium	0	1	0	1
8	Sweden	0	1	0	1
10	Argentina	0	0	1	1
10	Vietnam	0	0	1	1
Totals (11 entries)		5	5	5	15

== Nations League qualifier ==
Year	Relegated Challenger Team	Remaining Challenger Teams				Challenger Cup Winner
2018	Argentina ▼	Belgium	Dominican Republic	Poland	Only 4 challenger teams in the tournament	Bulgaria ▲
2019	Bulgaria ▼	Belgium	Dominican Republic	Poland	Only 4 challenger teams in the tournament	Canada ▲
2021	None	Belgium	Dominican Republic	Poland	Canada	Cancelled
2022	Belgium ▼	Bulgaria (Note: Bulgaria replaced Russia due to its invasion of Ukraine. As a result, Russia was out of the Nations League.)	Dominican Republic	Poland	Canada	Croatia ▲
2023	Croatia ▼	Bulgaria	Dominican Republic	Poland	Canada	France ▲
2024	None					Czech Republic ▲

== See also ==
- FIVB Women's Volleyball Nations League
- FIVB Men's Volleyball Challenger Cup
- FIVB Men's Volleyball Nations League
