= Volleyball at the 2020 Summer Olympics – Women's European qualification squads =

This article shows all participating team squads at the 2020 Summer Olympics European qualification tournament, held in the Netherlands from 7 to 12 January 2020.

== Pool A ==
=== Netherlands ===
The following is the Dutch roster in the 2020 Summer Olympics qualification tournament.

- Head coach: Giovanni Caprara

No.	Name	Date of birth	Height	Weight	Spike	Block	2019–20 club
1	Kirsten Knip	14 September 1992 (aged 27)	1.76 m (5 ft 9 in)	73 kg (161 lb)	281 cm (111 in)	275 cm (108 in)	(Romania) Alba Blaj
3	Yvon Beliën	28 December 1993 (aged 26)	1.88 m (6 ft 2 in)	70 kg (150 lb)	310 cm (120 in)	300 cm (120 in)	(Turkey) Galatasaray Daikin
4	Celeste Plak	26 October 1995 (aged 24)	1.90 m (6 ft 3 in)	84 kg (185 lb)	314 cm (124 in)	302 cm (119 in)	(Turkey) Aydın BB
5	Robin de Kruijf	5 May 1991 (aged 28)	1.93 m (6 ft 4 in)	79 kg (174 lb)	313 cm (123 in)	300 cm (120 in)	(Italy) Imoco Volley Conegliano
6	Maret Balkestein-Grothues	16 September 1988 (aged 31)	1.84 m (6 ft 0 in)	74 kg (163 lb)	290 cm (110 in)	280 cm (110 in)	(Turkey) Aydın BB
7	Juliët Lohuis	10 September 1996 (aged 23)	1.90 m (6 ft 3 in)	77 kg (170 lb)	305 cm (120 in)	295 cm (116 in)	(Germany) Allianz MTV Stuttgart
8	Floortje Meijners	16 January 1987 (aged 32)	1.92 m (6 ft 4 in)	78 kg (172 lb)	312 cm (123 in)	298 cm (117 in)	(Italy) Saugella Team Monza
9	Myrthe Schoot	29 August 1988 (aged 31)	1.83 m (6 ft 0 in)	70 kg (150 lb)	298 cm (117 in)	286 cm (113 in)	(Germany) Rote Raben Vilsbiburg
10	Lonneke Slöetjes	15 November 1990 (aged 29)	1.92 m (6 ft 4 in)	76 kg (168 lb)	322 cm (127 in)	315 cm (124 in)	(Italy) Savino del Bene Scandicci
11	Anne Buijs	2 December 1991 (aged 28)	1.91 m (6 ft 3 in)	75 kg (165 lb)	317 cm (125 in)	299 cm (118 in)	(Turkey) Türk Hava Yolları
12	Britt Bongaerts	3 November 1996 (aged 23)	1.85 m (6 ft 1 in)	68 kg (150 lb)	296 cm (117 in)	284 cm (112 in)	(Germany) Palmberg Schwerin
14	Laura Dijkema	18 February 1990 (aged 29)	1.84 m (6 ft 0 in)	70 kg (150 lb)	297 cm (117 in)	279 cm (110 in)	(Italy) Il Bisonte Firenze
19	Nika Daalderop	29 November 1998 (aged 21)	1.89 m (6 ft 2 in)	72 kg (159 lb)	317 cm (125 in)	308 cm (121 in)	(Italy) Il Bisonte Firenze
22	Nicole Koolhaas	31 January 1991 (aged 28)	1.98 m (6 ft 6 in)	77 kg (170 lb)	310 cm (120 in)	300 cm (120 in)	(Turkey) Yeşilyurt S.K.

=== Bulgaria ===
The following is the Bulgarian roster in the 2020 Summer Olympics qualification tournament.

- Head coach: Ivan Petkov

No.	Name	Date of birth	Height	Weight	Spike	Block	2019–20 club
1	Gergana Dimitrova	28 February 1996 (aged 23)	1.84 m (6 ft 0 in)	71 kg (157 lb)	305 cm (120 in)	288 cm (113 in)	(Turkey) PTT S.K.
2	Nasya Dimitrova	6 November 1992 (aged 27)	1.89 m (6 ft 2 in)	70 kg (150 lb)	305 cm (120 in)	297 cm (117 in)	(Turkey) PTT S.K.
3	Kristiana Petrova	13 July 1997 (aged 22)	1.80 m (5 ft 11 in)	60 kg (130 lb)	295 cm (116 in)	285 cm (112 in)	(Bulgaria) Levski Sofia
7	Lora Kitipova	19 May 1991 (aged 28)	1.82 m (6 ft 0 in)	69 kg (152 lb)	280 cm (110 in)	275 cm (108 in)	(Romania) CSM Volei Alba Blaj
8	Petya Barakova	18 June 1994 (aged 25)	1.78 m (5 ft 10 in)	71 kg (157 lb)	291 cm (115 in)	280 cm (110 in)	(France) Volero Le Cannet
10	Mira Todorova	12 April 1994 (aged 25)	1.88 m (6 ft 2 in)	70 kg (150 lb)	299 cm (118 in)	291 cm (115 in)	(France) RC Cannes
11	Hristina Ruseva	1 October 1991 (aged 28)	1.90 m (6 ft 3 in)	77 kg (170 lb)	305 cm (120 in)	290 cm (110 in)	(Bulgaria) Maritza Plovdiv
12	Mariya Karakasheva	27 October 1988 (aged 31)	1.82 m (6 ft 0 in)	67 kg (148 lb)	290 cm (110 in)	282 cm (111 in)	(Romania) CSM Volei Alba Blaj
14	Aleksandra Milanova	4 July 2001 (aged 18)	1.80 m (5 ft 11 in)	72 kg (159 lb)	290 cm (110 in)	281 cm (111 in)	(Bulgaria) Maritza Plovdiv
15	Zhana Todorova	6 January 1997 (aged 23)	1.70 m (5 ft 7 in)	55 kg (121 lb)	260 cm (100 in)	235 cm (93 in)	(Bulgaria) Maritza Plovdiv
16	Elitsa Vasileva	13 May 1990 (aged 29)	1.92 m (6 ft 4 in)	73 kg (161 lb)	305 cm (120 in)	295 cm (116 in)	(Italy) Igor Gorgonzola Novara
18	Silvana Chausheva	19 May 1995 (aged 24)	1.88 m (6 ft 2 in)	78 kg (172 lb)	305 cm (120 in)	290 cm (110 in)	(Italy) Volley Soverato
20	Mariya Krivoshiyska	6 September 2001 (aged 18)	1.87 m (6 ft 2 in)	76 kg (168 lb)	295 cm (116 in)	285 cm (112 in)	(Bulgaria) Beroe Stara Zagora
23	Vangeliya Rachkovska	19 July 1997 (aged 22)	1.85 m (6 ft 1 in)	62 kg (137 lb)	300 cm (120 in)	280 cm (110 in)	(Bulgaria) Levski Sofia

=== Poland ===
The following is the Polish roster in the 2020 Summer Olympics qualification tournament.

- Head coach: Jacek Nawrocki

No.	Name	Date of birth	Height	Weight	Spike	Block	2019–20 club
2	Anna Stencel	28 August 1995 (aged 24)	1.87 m (6 ft 2 in)	71 kg (157 lb)	300 cm (120 in)	280 cm (110 in)	(Poland) Pałac Bydgoszcz
3	Klaudia Alagierska	2 January 1996 (aged 24)	1.90 m (6 ft 3 in)	76 kg (168 lb)	297 cm (117 in)	285 cm (112 in)	(Poland) ŁKS Commercecon Łódź
5	Agnieszka Kąkolewska	17 October 1994 (aged 25)	1.99 m (6 ft 6 in)	85 kg (187 lb)	328 cm (129 in)	309 cm (122 in)	(Italy) Pomì Casalmaggiore
6	Martyna Łukasik	26 November 1999 (aged 20)	1.89 m (6 ft 2 in)	75 kg (165 lb)	305 cm (120 in)	288 cm (113 in)	(Poland) Chemik Police
8	Maria Stenzel	25 November 1998 (aged 21)	1.67 m (5 ft 6 in)	61 kg (134 lb)	275 cm (108 in)	264 cm (104 in)	(Poland) Grot Budowlani Łódź
9	Magdalena Stysiak	3 December 2000 (aged 19)	2.03 m (6 ft 8 in)	88 kg (194 lb)	308 cm (121 in)	300 cm (120 in)	(Poland) Chemik Police
11	Monika Jagła	1 April 2000 (aged 19)	1.77 m (5 ft 10 in)	69 kg (152 lb)	298 cm (117 in)	285 cm (112 in)	(Poland) Pałac Bydgoszcz
14	Joanna Wołosz	7 April 1990 (aged 29)	1.81 m (5 ft 11 in)	65 kg (143 lb)	303 cm (119 in)	281 cm (111 in)	(Italy) Imoco Volley Conegliano
15	Aleksandra Wójcik	3 January 1994 (aged 26)	1.85 m (6 ft 1 in)	74 kg (163 lb)	305 cm (120 in)	290 cm (110 in)	(Poland) ŁKS Commercecon Łódź
16	Natalia Mędrzyk	13 January 1992 (aged 27)	1.84 m (6 ft 0 in)	74 kg (163 lb)	306 cm (120 in)	296 cm (117 in)	(Poland) Chemik Police
17	Malwina Smarzek	3 June 1996 (aged 23)	1.91 m (6 ft 3 in)	79 kg (174 lb)	318 cm (125 in)	305 cm (120 in)	(Italy) Zanetti Bergamo
19	Monika Fedusio	6 November 1999 (aged 20)	1.83 m (6 ft 0 in)	76 kg (168 lb)	303 cm (119 in)	280 cm (110 in)	(Poland) Pałac Bydgoszcz
20	Marlena Kowalewska	9 January 1992 (aged 27)	1.76 m (5 ft 9 in)	61 kg (134 lb)	291 cm (115 in)	285 cm (112 in)	(Poland) Chemik Police
23	Zuzanna Górecka	10 April 2000 (aged 19)	1.81 m (5 ft 11 in)	63 kg (139 lb)	301 cm (119 in)	284 cm (112 in)	(Italy) AGIL Volley

=== Azerbaijan ===
The following is the Azerbaijan roster in the 2020 Summer Olympics qualification tournament.

- Head coach: Vasif Talibov

No.	Name	Date of birth	Height	Weight	Spike	Block	2019–20 club
3	Anastasiya Gurbanova	4 December 1989 (aged 30)	1.90 m (6 ft 3 in)	73 kg (161 lb)	305 cm (120 in)	290 cm (110 in)	(Tunisia) Club Féminine de Carthage
4	Nelli Salbishvili	17 June 1999 (aged 20)	1.86 m (6 ft 1 in)	63 kg (139 lb)	304 cm (120 in)	289 cm (114 in)	(Azerbaijan) Azerrail Baku
6	Ayshan Abdulazimova	11 April 1993 (aged 26)	1.85 m (6 ft 1 in)	62 kg (137 lb)	315 cm (124 in)	305 cm (120 in)	(Hungary) Vasas SC
8	Yelyzaveta Samadova	3 March 1995 (aged 24)	1.84 m (6 ft 0 in)	68 kg (150 lb)	318 cm (125 in)	305 cm (120 in)	(Russia) Leningradka Saint Petersburg
10	Nikalina Bashnakova	29 March 1998 (aged 21)	1.90 m (6 ft 3 in)	70 kg (150 lb)	298 cm (117 in)	285 cm (112 in)	(Turkey) Sarıyer Belediyespor
14	Krystsina Yagubova	13 February 1996 (aged 23)	1.84 m (6 ft 0 in)	69 kg (152 lb)	300 cm (120 in)	295 cm (116 in)	(Finland) LP Viesti
16	Iuliia Karimova	7 February 1988 (aged 31)	1.75 m (5 ft 9 in)	68 kg (150 lb)	270 cm (110 in)	260 cm (100 in)	(Israel) Maccabi Haifa
17	Polina Rahimova	5 June 1990 (aged 29)	1.98 m (6 ft 6 in)	91 kg (201 lb)	330 cm (130 in)	305 cm (120 in)	(Brazil) Sesi Volei Bauru
18	Shafagat Alishanova	3 August 1991 (aged 28)	1.78 m (5 ft 10 in)	70 kg (150 lb)	305 cm (120 in)	300 cm (120 in)	(Poland) E.Leclerc Radomka Radom
19	Bayaz Aliyeva	9 June 1990 (aged 29)	1.78 m (5 ft 10 in)	65 kg (143 lb)	293 cm (115 in)	297 cm (117 in)	(Azerbaijan) Azerrail Baku
20	Marharyta Azizova	25 April 1993 (aged 26)	1.87 m (6 ft 2 in)	70 kg (150 lb)	315 cm (124 in)	300 cm (120 in)	(Poland) Enea PTPS Piła
21	Kseniya Pavlenko	30 August 1993 (aged 26)	1.84 m (6 ft 0 in)	72 kg (159 lb)	297 cm (117 in)	285 cm (112 in)	(Finland) LP Viesti Salo
22	Maryia Kiryliuk	16 February 1995 (aged 24)	1.95 m (6 ft 5 in)	80 kg (180 lb)	309 cm (122 in)	300 cm (120 in)	(Azerbaijan) Azerrail Baku

== Pool B ==
=== Turkey ===
The following is the Turkish roster in the 2020 Summer Olympics qualification tournament.

- Head coach: Giovanni Guidetti

No.	Name	Date of birth	Height	Weight	Spike	Block	2019–20 club
2	Simge Aköz	23 April 1991 (aged 28)	1.68 m (5 ft 6 in)	56 kg (123 lb)	250 cm (98 in)	245 cm (96 in)	(Turkey) Eczacıbaşı VitrA
3	Cansu Özbay	17 October 1996 (aged 23)	1.82 m (6 ft 0 in)	78 kg (172 lb)	298 cm (117 in)	290 cm (110 in)	(Turkey) Vakıfbank Istanbul
5	Şeyma Ercan	5 July 1994 (aged 25)	1.87 m (6 ft 2 in)	73 kg (161 lb)	305 cm (120 in)	294 cm (116 in)	(Turkey) Türk Hava Yolları
7	Hande Baladın	1 September 1997 (aged 22)	1.90 m (6 ft 3 in)	81 kg (179 lb)	309 cm (122 in)	300 cm (120 in)	(Turkey) Eczacıbaşı VitrA
9	Meliha İsmailoğlu	17 September 1993 (aged 26)	1.88 m (6 ft 2 in)	73 kg (161 lb)	303 cm (119 in)	291 cm (115 in)	(Turkey) Vakıfbank Istanbul
11	Naz Aydemir Akyol	14 August 1990 (aged 29)	1.86 m (6 ft 1 in)	67 kg (148 lb)	304 cm (120 in)	300 cm (120 in)	(Turkey) Fenerbahçe
13	Meryem Boz	2 March 1988 (aged 31)	1.90 m (6 ft 3 in)	68 kg (150 lb)	323 cm (127 in)	313 cm (123 in)	(Turkey) Aydın BB
14	Eda Erdem	22 June 1987 (aged 32)	1.88 m (6 ft 2 in)	74 kg (163 lb)	307 cm (121 in)	297 cm (117 in)	(Turkey) Fenerbahçe
18	Zehra Güneş	7 July 1999 (aged 20)	1.97 m (6 ft 6 in)	88 kg (194 lb)	319 cm (126 in)	310 cm (120 in)	(Turkey) Vakıfbank Istanbul
19	Aslı Kalaç	13 December 1995 (aged 24)	1.85 m (6 ft 1 in)	73 kg (161 lb)	308 cm (121 in)	301 cm (119 in)	(Turkey) Galatasaray S.K.
21	Fatma Yıldırım	3 January 1990 (aged 30)	1.80 m (5 ft 11 in)	64 kg (141 lb)	304 cm (120 in)	292 cm (115 in)	(Turkey) Fenerbahçe
96	Ayça Aykaç	27 February 1996 (aged 23)	1.76 m (5 ft 9 in)	54 kg (119 lb)	280 cm (110 in)	279 cm (110 in)	(Turkey) Atlas Global Yeşilyurt
98	Tuğba Şenoğlu	2 February 1998 (aged 21)	1.84 m (6 ft 0 in)	64 kg (141 lb)	305 cm (120 in)	300 cm (120 in)	(Turkey) Atlas Global Yeşilyurt
99	Ebrar Karakurt	17 January 2000 (aged 19)	1.86 m (6 ft 1 in)	73 kg (161 lb)	315 cm (124 in)	304 cm (120 in)	(Turkey) Vakıfbank Istanbul

=== Germany ===
The following is the German roster in the 2020 Summer Olympics qualification tournament.

- Head coach: Felix Koslowski

No.	Name	Date of birth	Height	Weight	Spike	Block	2019–20 club
3	Denise Hanke	31 August 1989 (aged 30)	1.79 m (5 ft 10 in)	58 kg (128 lb)	284 cm (112 in)	272 cm (107 in)	(Germany) SSC Palmberg Schwerin
5	Jana Franziska Poll	7 May 1988 (aged 31)	1.85 m (6 ft 1 in)	69 kg (152 lb)	310 cm (120 in)	290 cm (110 in)	(Germany) Allianz MTV Stuttgart
6	Jennifer Geerties	5 April 1994 (aged 25)	1.84 m (6 ft 0 in)	58 kg (128 lb)	298 cm (117 in)	288 cm (113 in)	(Germany) SSC Palmberg Schwerin
8	Kimberly Drewniok	11 August 1997 (aged 22)	1.88 m (6 ft 2 in)	73 kg (161 lb)	311 cm (122 in)	298 cm (117 in)	(Germany) Wiesbaden
10	Lena Stigrot	20 December 1994 (aged 25)	1.84 m (6 ft 0 in)	68 kg (150 lb)	303 cm (119 in)	295 cm (116 in)	(Germany) Rote Raben Vilsbiburg
11	Louisa Lippmann	23 September 1994 (aged 25)	1.91 m (6 ft 3 in)	78 kg (172 lb)	319 cm (126 in)	312 cm (123 in)	(Germany) SSC Palmberg Schwerin
12	Hanna Orthmann	10 October 1998 (aged 21)	1.88 m (6 ft 2 in)	74 kg (163 lb)	302 cm (119 in)	291 cm (115 in)	(Italy) Saugella Team Monza
14	Marie Schölzel	1 August 1997 (aged 22)	1.88 m (6 ft 2 in)	66 kg (146 lb)	307 cm (121 in)	299 cm (118 in)	(Germany) SSC Palmberg Schwerin
15	Lena Möllers	6 January 1990 (aged 30)	1.88 m (6 ft 2 in)	78 kg (172 lb)	312 cm (123 in)	297 cm (117 in)	(Germany) Rote Raben Vilsbiburg
16	Linda Bock	27 May 2000 (aged 19)	1.72 m (5 ft 8 in)	60 kg (130 lb)	278 cm (109 in)	270 cm (110 in)	(Germany) USC Münster
17	Anna Pogany	21 July 1994 (aged 25)	1.70 m (5 ft 7 in)	60 kg (130 lb)	280 cm (110 in)	270 cm (110 in)	(Germany) SSC Palmberg Schwerin
19	Ivana Vanjak	30 May 1995 (aged 24)	1.90 m (6 ft 3 in)	70 kg (150 lb)	315 cm (124 in)	306 cm (120 in)	(Germany) Münster
21	Camilla Weitzel	11 June 2000 (aged 19)	1.95 m (6 ft 5 in)	82 kg (181 lb)	305 cm (120 in)	289 cm (114 in)	(Germany) Dresdner SC
22	Lisa Gründing	2 December 1991 (aged 28)	1.85 m (6 ft 1 in)	75 kg (165 lb)	302 cm (119 in)	294 cm (116 in)	(Germany) SC Potsdam

=== Belgium ===
The following is the Belgian roster in the 2020 Summer Olympics qualification tournament.

- Head coach: Gert Van de Broek

No.	Name	Date of birth	Height	Weight	Spike	Block	2019–20 club
3	Britt Herbots	24 September 1999 (aged 20)	1.82 m (6 ft 0 in)	63 kg (139 lb)	310 cm (120 in)	290 cm (110 in)	(Italy) Unet E-Work Busto Arsizio
4	Nathalie Lemmens	12 March 1995 (aged 24)	1.92 m (6 ft 4 in)	85 kg (187 lb)	311 cm (122 in)	288 cm (113 in)	(Germany) VC Wiesbaden
7	Celine Van Gestel	7 November 1997 (aged 22)	1.83 m (6 ft 0 in)	70 kg (150 lb)	310 cm (120 in)	280 cm (110 in)	(Belgium) Asterix Avo Beveren
8	Kaja Grobelna	4 January 1995 (aged 25)	1.88 m (6 ft 2 in)	72 kg (159 lb)	318 cm (125 in)	299 cm (118 in)	(Italy) Reale Fenera Mutua Chieri
10	Dominika Sobolska	3 December 1991 (aged 28)	1.87 m (6 ft 2 in)	83 kg (183 lb)	309 cm (122 in)	292 cm (115 in)	(Turkey) Aydın BB
11	Britt Ruysschaert	27 May 1994 (aged 25)	1.80 m (5 ft 11 in)	60 kg (130 lb)	302 cm (119 in)	281 cm (111 in)	(Belgium) Interfreight Antwerp
13	Marlies Janssens	4 June 1997 (aged 22)	1.93 m (6 ft 4 in)	79 kg (174 lb)	312 cm (123 in)	299 cm (118 in)	(Belgium) Asterix Avo Beveren
15	Jutta Van de Vyver	11 June 1996 (aged 23)	1.75 m (5 ft 9 in)	60 kg (130 lb)	296 cm (117 in)	281 cm (111 in)	(Belgium) Asterix Avo Beveren
16	Karolina Goliat	25 October 1996 (aged 23)	1.89 m (6 ft 2 in)	79 kg (174 lb)	308 cm (121 in)	295 cm (116 in)	(France) VC Marcq-en-Barœul
17	Ilka Van de Vyver	26 January 1993 (aged 26)	1.70 m (5 ft 7 in)	79 kg (174 lb)	296 cm (117 in)	273 cm (107 in)	(Romania) CSM Târgovişte
19	Silke Van Avermaet	2 June 1999 (aged 20)	1.92 m (6 ft 4 in)	76 kg (168 lb)	311 cm (122 in)	290 cm (110 in)	(Belgium) Asterix Avo Beveren
20	Jodie Guilliams	26 April 1997 (aged 22)	1.80 m (5 ft 11 in)	73 kg (161 lb)	305 cm (120 in)	289 cm (114 in)	(Germany) Roten Raben Vilsbiburg
21	Manon Stragier	12 March 1999 (aged 20)	1.82 m (6 ft 0 in)	69 kg (152 lb)	308 cm (121 in)	283 cm (111 in)	(Belgium) VDK Gent Dames
22	Anna Valkenborg	4 January 1998 (aged 22)	1.74 m (5 ft 9 in)	59 kg (130 lb)	290 cm (110 in)	270 cm (110 in)	(Belgium) Asterix Avo Beveren

=== Croatia ===
The following is the Croatian roster in the 2020 Summer Olympics qualification tournament.

- Head coach: Daniele Santarelli

No.	Name	Date of birth	Height	Weight	Spike	Block	2019–20 club
1	Rene Sain	23 April 1997 (aged 22)	1.63 m (5 ft 4 in)	54 kg (119 lb)	264 cm (104 in)	250 cm (98 in)	(Romania) CS Știința Bacău
3	Ema Strunjak	24 September 1999 (aged 20)	1.88 m (6 ft 2 in)	74 kg (163 lb)	301 cm (119 in)	294 cm (116 in)	(Italy) Bartoccini Fortinfissi Perugia
4	Božana Butigan	19 August 2000 (aged 19)	1.89 m (6 ft 2 in)	75 kg (165 lb)	305 cm (120 in)	280 cm (110 in)	(Croatia) HAOK Mladost
5	Nikolina Božičević	14 January 1995 (aged 24)	1.63 m (5 ft 4 in)	54 kg (119 lb)	215 cm (85 in)	210 cm (83 in)	(Finland) Pölkky Kuusamo
8	Katarina Pavičić	17 May 1999 (aged 20)	1.80 m (5 ft 11 in)	63 kg (139 lb)	294 cm (116 in)	284 cm (112 in)	(Croatia) HAOK Mladost
9	Lucija Mlinar	6 May 1995 (aged 24)	1.80 m (5 ft 11 in)	70 kg (150 lb)	295 cm (116 in)	280 cm (110 in)	(Germany) Dresdner SC
10	Matea Ikić	25 May 1989 (aged 30)	1.85 m (6 ft 1 in)	74 kg (163 lb)	305 cm (120 in)	295 cm (116 in)	(Turkey) Kuzeyboru
11	Sanja Popović	31 May 1984 (aged 35)	1.86 m (6 ft 1 in)	84 kg (185 lb)	325 cm (128 in)	310 cm (120 in)	(Romania) CSM Volei Alba Blaj
12	Beta Dumančić	26 March 1991 (aged 28)	1.90 m (6 ft 3 in)	80 kg (180 lb)	308 cm (121 in)	299 cm (118 in)	(Germany) Schweriner SC
13	Samanta Fabris	8 February 1992 (aged 27)	1.90 m (6 ft 3 in)	80 kg (180 lb)	318 cm (125 in)	304 cm (120 in)	(Russia) WVC Dynamo Kazan
14	Martina Šamadan	11 September 1993 (aged 26)	1.93 m (6 ft 4 in)	80 kg (180 lb)	310 cm (120 in)	305 cm (120 in)	(Germany) Allianz MTV Stuttgart
15	Bernarda Brčić	12 May 1991 (aged 28)	1.92 m (6 ft 4 in)	78 kg (172 lb)	305 cm (120 in)	300 cm (120 in)	(France) ASPTT Mulhouse
17	Lea Deak	27 April 2000 (aged 19)	1.78 m (5 ft 10 in)	62 kg (137 lb)	268 cm (106 in)	255 cm (100 in)	(Croatia) HAOK Mladost
18	Lara Vukasović	10 November 1994 (aged 25)	1.97 m (6 ft 6 in)	84 kg (185 lb)	300 cm (120 in)	295 cm (116 in)	(Italy) Volleyball Casalmaggiore

== See also ==
- Volleyball at the 2020 Summer Olympics – Men's European qualification squads
