= 2018 Women's European Volleyball League =

European volleyball tournament

2018 Women's European League
Tournament details
- Host country: Hungary
- Dates: 19 May – 17 June
- Teams: 20

Final positions
- Champions: Bulgaria (1st title)
- Runners-up: Hungary
- Third place: Czech Republic
- Fourth place: Finland

Tournament awards
- MVP: (Bulgaria) Mariya Karakasheva
- Best Setter: (Bulgaria) Lora Kitipova
- Best OH: (Hungary) Gréta Szakmáry (Czech Republic) Michaela Mlejnková
- Best MB: (Bulgaria) Hristina Ruseva (Finland) Laura Pihlajamäki
- Best OPP: (Bulgaria) Silvana Chausheva
- Best Libero: (Hungary) Rita Molcsányi

The 2018 Women's European Volleyball League was the 10th edition of the annual Women's European Volleyball League, which features women's national volleyball teams from 20 European countries.

Unlike previous seasons, the tournament had two divisions: the Golden League, featuring twelve teams, and the Silver League, featuring eight teams.

It also acts as the European qualifying competition for the 2018 FIVB Volleyball Women's Challenger Cup, securing two vacancies for the tournament that will then serve as the qualifying competition for the 2019 FIVB Volleyball Women's Nations League.

== Pools composition ==
=== Golden league ===
Pool A	Pool B	Pool C
Bulgaria	Croatia	Czech Republic
Ukraine	Hungary	Belarus
Azerbaijan	France	Slovakia
Portugal	Finland	Spain

=== Silver league ===
Pool A	Pool B
Kosovo	Albania
Sweden	Israel
Estonia	Austria
Switzerland	Georgia

== Golden league ==
- All times are local.

=== Pool A ===
Pos	Team	Pld	W	L	Pts	SW	SL	SR	SPW	SPL	SPR	Qualification
1	Bulgaria	6	5	1	15	16	5	3.200	513	436	1.177	Final round
2	Azerbaijan	6	5	1	15	16	7	2.286	549	492	1.116	
3	Ukraine	6	2	4	6	8	13	0.615	483	491	0.984	
4	Portugal	6	0	6	0	3	18	0.167	397	523	0.759	

Date	Time		Score		Set 1	Set 2	Set 3	Set 4	Set 5	Total	Report
19 May	17:00	Bulgaria	3–0	Portugal	25–13	25–18	25–19			75–50	Report
19 May	18:00	Azerbaijan	3–1	Ukraine	16–25	25–19	25–23	28–26		94–93	Report
23 May	18:00	Azerbaijan	3–1	Portugal	24–26	25–17	25–14	25–17		99–74	Report
23 May	18:30	Bulgaria	3–1	Ukraine	32–34	25–10	25–22	25–21		107–87	Report
26 May	17:00	Bulgaria	3–1	Azerbaijan	17–25	25–17	25–14	25–21		92–77	Report
27 May	17:00	Portugal	0–3	Ukraine	22–25	14–25	13–25			49–75	Report
30 May	17:00	Ukraine	3–1	Portugal	25–19	21–25	25–22	25–20		96–86	Report
30 May	18:00	Azerbaijan	3–1	Bulgaria	25–20	23–25	25–21	25–21		98–87	Report
2 Jun	18:00	Ukraine	0–3	Bulgaria	18–25	20–25	22–25			60–75	Report
2 Jun	15:00	Portugal	1–3	Azerbaijan	20–25	28–26	11–25	15–25		74–101	Report
6 Jun	17:00	Ukraine	0–3	Azerbaijan	28–30	21–25	23–25			72–80	Report
6 Jun	16:00	Portugal	0–3	Bulgaria	17–25	22–25	25–27			64–77	Report

=== Pool B ===
Pos	Team	Pld	W	L	Pts	SW	SL	SR	SPW	SPL	SPR	Qualification
1	Finland	6	4	2	13	14	9	1.556	533	471	1.132	Final round
2	Hungary	6	4	2	12	15	9	1.667	536	508	1.055	Final round as host country
3	Croatia	6	3	3	8	12	12	1.000	529	549	0.964	
4	France	6	1	5	3	5	16	0.313	432	502	0.861	

Date	Time		Score		Set 1	Set 2	Set 3	Set 4	Set 5	Total	Report
19 May	17:00	Croatia	3–0	Finland	25–21	26–24	25–19			76–64	Report
20 May	18:30	Hungary	3–0	France	25–16	25–19	25–20			75–55	Report
23 May	18:30	Hungary	3–1	Croatia	26–24	25–23	23–25	25–12		99–84	Report
23 May	18:30	Finland	3–0	France	25–18	25–13	25–21			75–52	Report
26 May	16:00	Finland	3–1	Hungary	25–19	23–25	25–16	25–19		98–79	Report
26 May	20:00	Croatia	3–1	France	25–19	25–21	18–25	27–25		95–90	Report
30 May	17:00	Finland	3–1	Croatia	25–18	24–26	25–15	25–19		99–78	Report
30 May	20:00	France	0–3	Hungary	23–25	18–25	19–25			60–75	Report
2 Jun	17:00	Croatia	3–2	Hungary	23–25	25–23	25–15	19–25	15–9	107–97	Report
2 Jun	20:00	France	1–3	Finland	14–25	25–18	14–25	22–25		75–93	Report
6 Jun	18:30	Hungary	3–2	Finland	25–20	25–27	21–25	25–21	15–11	111–104	Report
6 Jun	20:00	France	3–1	Croatia	25–18	27–25	23–25	25–21		100–89	Report

=== Pool C ===
Pos	Team	Pld	W	L	Pts	SW	SL	SR	SPW	SPL	SPR	Qualification
1	Czech Republic	6	6	0	17	18	3	6.000	493	411	1.200	Final round
2	Belarus	6	3	3	8	12	13	0.923	531	535	0.993	
3	Slovakia	6	2	4	6	9	15	0.600	515	526	0.979	
4	Spain	6	1	5	5	8	16	0.500	482	549	0.878	

Date	Time		Score		Set 1	Set 2	Set 3	Set 4	Set 5	Total	Report
19 May	15:00	Slovakia	2–3	Belarus	24–26	25–18	24–26	25–21	8–15	106–106	Report
19 May	19:00	Spain	0–3	Czech Republic	23–25	21–25	12–25			56–75	Report
23 May	16:00	Belarus	3–0	Slovakia	25–23	25–19	25–20			75–62	Report
23 May	17:00	Czech Republic	3–0	Spain	25–20	25–16	25–21			75–57	Report
26 May	16:00	Belarus	1–3	Spain	21–25	25–11	23–25	16–25		85–86	Report
26 May	16:00	Czech Republic	3–0	Slovakia	25–17	25–20	25–19			75–56	Report
30 May	17:00	Slovakia	1–3	Czech Republic	25–16	16–25	23–25	18–25		82–91	Report
30 May	20:30	Spain	2–3	Belarus	23–25	25–21	22–25	25–19	9–15	104–105	Report
2 Jun	18:00	Czech Republic	3–0	Belarus	25–18	25–18	25–21			75–57	Report
2 Jun	19:00	Spain	1–3	Slovakia	21–25	17–25	25–20	27–29		90–99	Report
6 Jun	18:00	Belarus	2–3	Czech Republic	21–25	25–18	25–19	20–25	12–15	103–102	Report
6 Jun	18:00	Slovakia	3–2	Spain	25–17	22–25	23–25	25–16	15–6	110–89	Report

== Silver league ==
- All times are local.

=== Pool A ===
Pos	Team	Pld	W	L	Pts	SW	SL	SR	SPW	SPL	SPR	Qualification
1	Estonia	6	5	1	14	17	8	2.125	574	460	1.248	Final round
2	Sweden	6	4	2	13	16	8	2.000	534	462	1.156	Final round as host country
3	Switzerland	6	3	3	9	12	11	1.091	481	480	1.002	
4	Kosovo	6	0	6	0	0	18	0.000	263	450	0.584	

Date	Time		Score		Set 1	Set 2	Set 3	Set 4	Set 5	Total	Report
19 May	19:00	Sweden	3–0	Switzerland	25–13	26–24	25–17			76–54	Report
20 May	19:00	Kosovo	0–3	Estonia	8–25	12–25	17–25			37–75	Report
23 May	17:00	Estonia	3–2	Switzerland	21–25	25–17	24–26	25–18	15–12	110–98	Report
23 May	20:00	Kosovo	0–3	Sweden	21–25	23–25	10–25			54–75	Report
26 May	17:00	Estonia	2–3	Sweden	25–17	25–18	33–35	20–25	7–15	110–110	Report
26 May	17:30	Switzerland	3–0	Kosovo	25–14	25–15	25–17			75–46	Report
30 May	17:00	Sweden	2–3	Estonia	25–20	18–25	25–21	25–27	6–15	99–108	Report
30 May	19:30	Kosovo	0–3	Switzerland	18–25	20–25	15–25			53–75	Report
2 Jun	16:00	Sweden	3–0	Kosovo	25–11	25–15	25–7			75–33	Report
3 Jun	16:30	Switzerland	1–3	Estonia	25–21	19–25	17–25	15–25		76–96	Report
6 Jun	17:00	Estonia	3–0	Kosovo	25–15	25–8	25–17			75–40	Report
6 Jun	19:30	Switzerland	3–2	Sweden	25–22	25–15	17–25	21–25	15–12	103–99	Report

=== Pool B ===
Pos	Team	Pld	W	L	Pts	SW	SL	SR	SPW	SPL	SPR	Qualification
1	Austria	6	5	1	16	17	6	2.833	538	441	1.220	Final round
2	Albania	6	5	1	14	15	6	2.500	492	413	1.191	Final round
3	Israel	6	1	5	3	6	16	0.375	448	528	0.848	
4	Georgia	6	1	5	3	5	15	0.333	387	483	0.801	

Date	Time		Score		Set 1	Set 2	Set 3	Set 4	Set 5	Total	Report
19 May	15:00	Austria	3–1	Israel	25–21	25–12	20–25	25–15		95–73	Report
20 May	17:00	Georgia	0–3	Albania	16–25	18–25	22–25			56–75	Report
23 May	19:00	Israel	3–1	Georgia	25–21	23–25	25–20	25–16		98–82	Report
23 May	19:00	Albania	0–3	Austria	18–25	17–25	21–25			56–75	Report
26 May	17:00	Georgia	0–3	Austria	17–25	14–25	14–25			45–75	Report
26 May	19:00	Israel	0–3	Albania	18–25	16–25	14–25			48–75	Report
30 May	17:00	Albania	3–1	Israel	25–23	25–19	27–29	25–16		102–87	Report
30 May	17:45	Austria	3–1	Georgia	25–21	25–16	23–25	25–16		98–78	Report
2 Jun	17:45	Austria	2–3	Albania	25–21	25–22	19–25	16–25	11–15	96–108	Report
2 Jun	20:00	Georgia	3–0	Israel	25–21	25–18	25–22			75–61	Report
6 Jun	17:00	Albania	3–0	Georgia	25–14	25–13	26–24			76–51	Report
6 Jun	19:00	Israel	1–3	Austria	26–24	17–25	22–25	16–25		81–99	Report

== Final round ==
- All times are Central European Summer Time (UTC+02:00).

=== Silver league ===
- Venue: Rosvalla Nyköping Eventcenter, Nyköping, Sweden

Semifinals
16 June
Albania	0
Sweden	3
16 June
Austria	3
Estonia	1

Final
17 June
Sweden	3
Austria	1
3rd place match
17 June
Albania	3
Estonia	0

==== Semifinals ====
Date	Time		Score		Set 1	Set 2	Set 3	Set 4	Set 5	Total	Report
16 Jun	17:00	Albania	0–3	Sweden	14–25	21–25	21–25			56–75	Report
16 Jun	20:00	Austria	3–1	Estonia	21–25	25–22	26–24	25–16		97–87	Report

==== 3rd place match ====
Date	Time		Score		Set 1	Set 2	Set 3	Set 4	Set 5	Total	Report
17 Jun	16:00	Albania	3–0	Estonia	25–14	25–17	25–21			75–52	Report

==== Final ====
Date	Time		Score		Set 1	Set 2	Set 3	Set 4	Set 5	Total	Report
17 Jun	19:00	Sweden	3–1	Austria	25–23	25–21	16–25	25–17		91–86	Report

=== Golden league ===
- Venue: László Papp Budapest Sports Arena, Budapest, Hungary

Semifinals
14 June
Bulgaria	3
Finland	0
14 June
Hungary	3
Czech Republic	0

Final
15 June
Bulgaria	3
Hungary	0
3rd place match
15 June
Finland	1
Czech Republic	3

==== Semifinals ====
Date	Time		Score		Set 1	Set 2	Set 3	Set 4	Set 5	Total	Report
14 Jun	17:00	Bulgaria	3–0	Finland	25–21	25–13	25–14			75–48	Report
14 Jun	20:00	Hungary	3–0	Czech Republic	25–21	25–19	25–19			75–59	Report

==== 3rd place match ====
Date	Time		Score		Set 1	Set 2	Set 3	Set 4	Set 5	Total	Report
15 Jun	17:00	Finland	1–3	Czech Republic	17–25	26–28	27–25	21–25		91–103	Report

==== Final ====
Date	Time		Score		Set 1	Set 2	Set 3	Set 4	Set 5	Total	Report
15 Jun	20:00	Bulgaria	3–0	Hungary	25–12	27–25	25–14			77–51	Report

== Final standing ==
Rank	Team
1st place, gold medalist(s)	Bulgaria
2nd place, silver medalist(s)	Hungary
3rd place, bronze medalist(s)	Czech Republic
4	Finland
5	Azerbaijan
6	Belarus
7	Croatia
8	Ukraine
9	Slovakia
10	Spain
11	France
12	Portugal
13	Sweden
14	Austria
15	Albania
16	Estonia
17	Switzerland
18	Israel
19	Georgia
20	Kosovo

Qualified for the 2018 Challenger Cup

2018 European League champions

Bulgaria
1st title

14-woman Roster for Golden League Final Round
Gergana Dimitrova, Nasya Dimitrova, Kristiana Petrova, Veselina Grigorova, Lora Kitipova, Petya Barakova, Monika Krasteva, Mira Todorova, Hristina Ruseva, Mariya Karakasheva, Zhana Todorova, Borislava Saykova, Silvana Chausheva, Aleksandra Milanova
Head coach
Ivan Petkov

== Awards ==
- Most valuable player
  (Bulgaria) Mariya Karakasheva
- Best setter
  (Bulgaria) Lora Kitipova
- Best outside spikers
  (Hungary) Gréta Szakmáry
  (Czech Republic) Michaela Mlejnková
- Best middle blockers
  (Bulgaria) Hristina Ruseva
  (Finland) Laura Pihlajamäki
- Best opposite spiker
  (Bulgaria) Silvana Chausheva
- Best libero
  (Hungary) Rita Molcsányi

== See also ==
- 2018 Men's European Volleyball League
