= 2018 FIVB Women's Volleyball Challenger Cup =

International volleyball tournament

Copa Challenger de Femenino Perú 2018

Tournament details
- Host country: Peru
- City: Lima
- Dates: 20–24 June
- Teams: 6
- Venue: 1 (in 1 host city)

Final positions
- Champions: Bulgaria (1st title)
- Runners-up: Colombia
- Third place: Puerto Rico
- Fourth place: Peru

Tournament statistics
- Best scorer: (Colombia) Dayana Segovia (78 points)
- Best spiker: (Colombia) Dayana Segovia (39.41%)
- Best blocker: (Bulgaria) Hristina Ruseva (1.54 Avg)
- Best server: (Peru) Diana Dela Peña (0.43 Avg)
- Best setter: (Colombia) María Marín (31.14 Avg)
- Best digger: (Peru) Esmeralda Sanchez (4.43 Avg)
- Best receiver: (Bulgaria) Zhana Todorova (32.76%)

The 2018 FIVB Women's Volleyball Challenger Cup was the inaugural edition of the FIVB Women's Volleyball Challenger Cup, a new annual women's international volleyball tournament contested by six national teams that acts as a qualifier for the FIVB Women's Volleyball Nations League. The tournament was held in Lima, Peru between 20 and 24 June.

Bulgaria won the title, defeating Colombia in the final, and earned the right to participate in the 2019 Nations League replacing Argentina, the last placed challenger team after the 2018 edition. Puerto Rico defeated Peru in the third place match.

== Qualification ==
Six teams will compete in the tournament.

Country	Confederation	Qualified as	Qualified on	Previous appearances			Previous best performance
Country	Confederation	Qualified as	Qualified on	Total	First	Last	Previous best performance
Australia^{a}	AVC	Asian qualifier 3rd place	20 May 2018	0	None		None
Puerto Rico	NORCECA	North American qualifier champions	20 May 2018	0	None		None
Colombia^{b}	CSV	South American qualifier runner-up	27 May 2018	0	None		None
Peru	CSV	Host country	15 June 2018	0	None		None
Bulgaria	CEV	2018 Golden League champions	17 June 2018	0	None		None
Hungary	CEV	2018 Golden League runner-up	17 June 2018	0	None		None

Note
^a Australia replaced Kazakhstan, the Asian qualifier winners, who withdrew from the tournament.
^b Originally, a CSV representative was to face a team from Africa in a playoff for a spot in the Challenger Cup. According to the Chilean Volleyball Federation (FEVOCHI), however, FIVB fined the African Volleyball Confederation for not hosting any kind of qualifier event.

== Pools composition ==
Teams were seeded following the Serpentine system according to their FIVB World Ranking as of August 2017. FIVB reserved the right to seed the hosts as head of Pool A regardless of the World Ranking. Rankings are shown in brackets except hosts who ranked 26th.

Pool A	Pool B
Peru (Host)	Puerto Rico (13)
Colombia (28)	Bulgaria (17)
Hungary (30)	Australia (42)

== Venue ==
All matches
Lima, Peru
Coliseo Eduardo Dibos
Capacity: 4,600
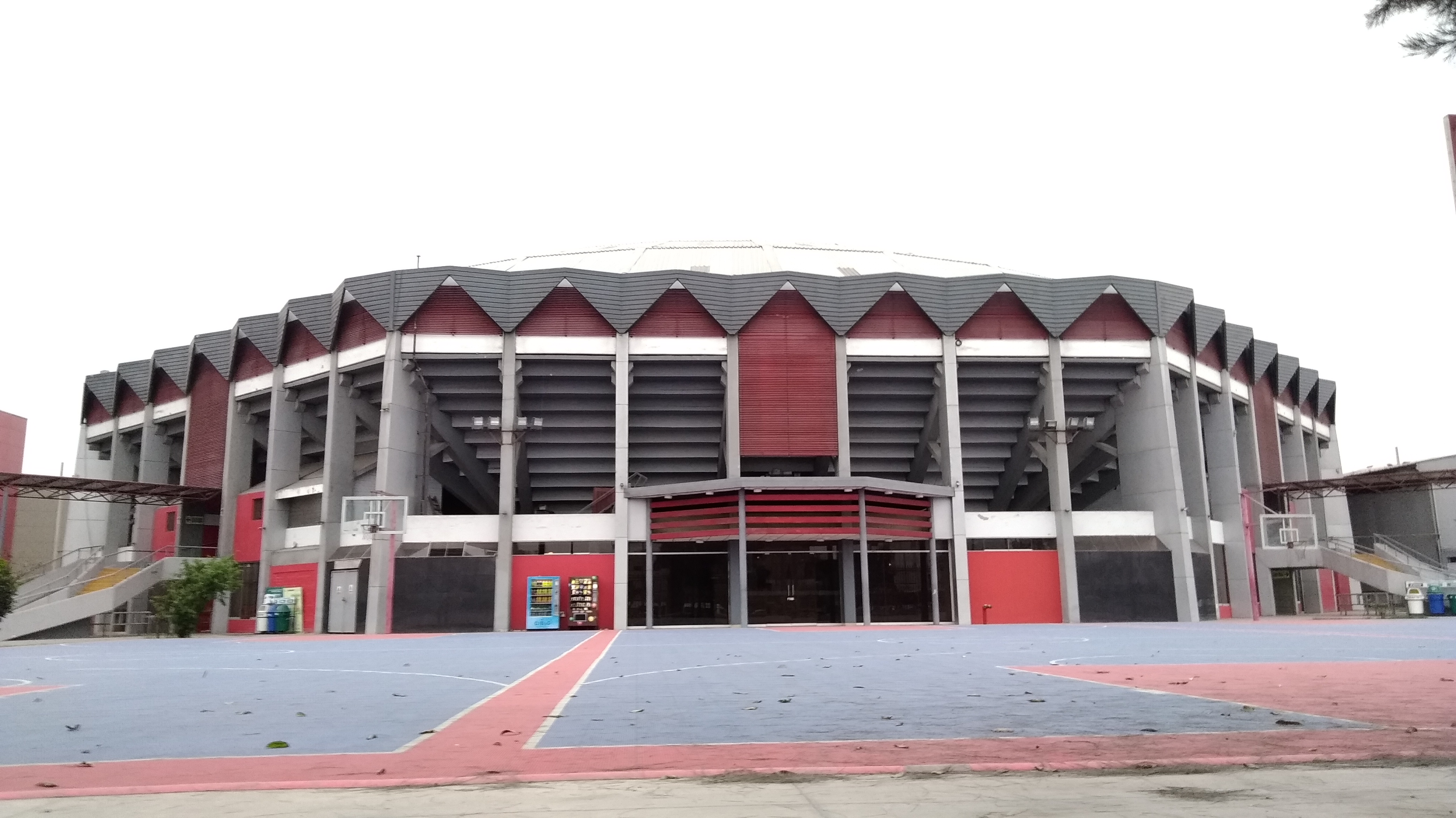

== Preliminary round ==
- Venue: Coliseo Eduardo Dibos, Lima, Peru
- All times are Peru Time (UTC-05:00).

=== Pool A ===
Pos	Team	Pld	W	L	Pts	SW	SL	SR	SPW	SPL	SPR	Qualification
1	Colombia	2	2	0	6	6	0	MAX	151	87	1.736	Final round
2	Peru	2	1	1	3	3	3	1.000	126	127	0.992	Final round
3	Hungary	2	0	2	0	0	6	0.000	90	153	0.588	

Date	Time		Score		Set 1	Set 2	Set 3	Set 4	Set 5	Total	Report
20 Jun	19:00	Peru	0–3	Colombia	24–26	12–25	12–25			48–76	Report
21 Jun	19:00	Colombia	3–0	Hungary	25–13	25–19	25–7			75–39	Report
22 Jun	19:00	Hungary	0–3	Peru	14–25	11–25	26–28			51–78	Report

=== Pool B ===
Pos	Team	Pld	W	L	Pts	SW	SL	SR	SPW	SPL	SPR	Qualification
1	Bulgaria	2	2	0	6	6	0	MAX	150	92	1.630	Final round
2	Puerto Rico	2	1	1	3	3	3	1.000	125	119	1.050	Final round
3	Australia	2	0	2	0	0	6	0.000	86	150	0.573	

Date	Time		Score		Set 1	Set 2	Set 3	Set 4	Set 5	Total	Report
20 Jun	17:00	Bulgaria	3–0	Australia	25–11	25–16	25–15			75–42	P2 Report
21 Jun	17:00	Puerto Rico	3–0	Australia	25–10	25–19	25–15			75–44	Report
22 Jun	17:00	Bulgaria	3–0	Puerto Rico	25–18	25–18	25–14			75–50	Report

== Final round ==
Semifinals
23 June – Lima
Colombia	3
Puerto Rico	1
23 June – Lima
Bulgaria	3
Peru	0

Final
24 June – Lima
Colombia	1
Bulgaria	3
3rd place match
24 June – Lima
Puerto Rico	3
Peru	2

=== Semifinals ===
Date	Time		Score		Set 1	Set 2	Set 3	Set 4	Set 5	Total	Report
23 June	16:00	Colombia	3–1	Puerto Rico	23–25	27–25	25–10	25–18		100–78	Report
23 June	18:00	Bulgaria	3–0	Peru	25–21	25–22	25–18			75–61	Report

=== 3rd place match ===
Date	Time		Score		Set 1	Set 2	Set 3	Set 4	Set 5	Total	Report
24 June	17:00	Puerto Rico	3–2	Peru	22–25	25–15	21–25	25–17	16–14	109–96	Report

=== Final ===
Date	Time		Score		Set 1	Set 2	Set 3	Set 4	Set 5	Total	Report
24 June	19:00	Colombia	1–3	Bulgaria	25–22	19–25	20–25	23–25		87–97	Report

== Final standing ==
Rank	Team
1st place, gold medalist(s)	Bulgaria
2nd place, silver medalist(s)	Colombia
3rd place, bronze medalist(s)	Puerto Rico
4	Peru
5	Australia
5	Hungary

Qualified for the 2019 Nations League

Source: VCC 2018 final standing

2018 Women's Challenger Cup champions

Bulgaria
1st title

14–woman Roster
Gergana Dimitrova, Nasya Dimitrova, Kristiana Petrova, Veselina Grigorova, Lora Kitipova, Petya Barakova, Monika Krasteva, Mira Todorova, Hristina Ruseva (c), Mariya Karakasheva, Zhana Todorova, Borislava Saykova, Silvana Chausheva, Aleksandra Milanova
Head coach
Ivan Petkov

== See also ==
- 2018 FIVB Women's Volleyball Nations League
- 2018 FIVB Men's Volleyball Challenger Cup
