= 2015 FIVB Volleyball World Grand Prix =

International women's volleyball tournament

2015 World Grand Prix

Tournament details
- Host country: United States
- City: Omaha (Group 1 Final)
- Dates: 26 June – 2 August
- Teams: 28 (from 5 confederations)
- Venues: 20 (in 20 host cities)

Final positions
- Champions: United States (6th title)
- Runners-up: Russia
- Third place: Brazil
- Fourth place: China

Tournament awards
- MVP: (United States) Karsta Lowe
- Best Setter: (United States) Molly Kreklow
- Best OH: (Brazil) Natalia Pereira (United States) Kelsey Robinson
- Best MB: (Brazil) Juciely Cristina Barreto (United States) Christa Harmotto
- Best OPP: (Russia) Nataliya Goncharova
- Best Libero: (Russia) Anna Malova

Tournament statistics
- Matches played: 121
- Best scorer: (Turkey) Uslupehlivan (159 points)
- Best spiker: (China) Zhu (54.10%)
- Best blocker: (Brazil) Juciely (1.17)
- Best server: (United States) Hill (0.43)
- Best setter: (Thailand) Tomkom (9.13)
- Best digger: (Belgium) Courtois (3.00)
- Best receiver: (Brazil) Gabi (53.85%)

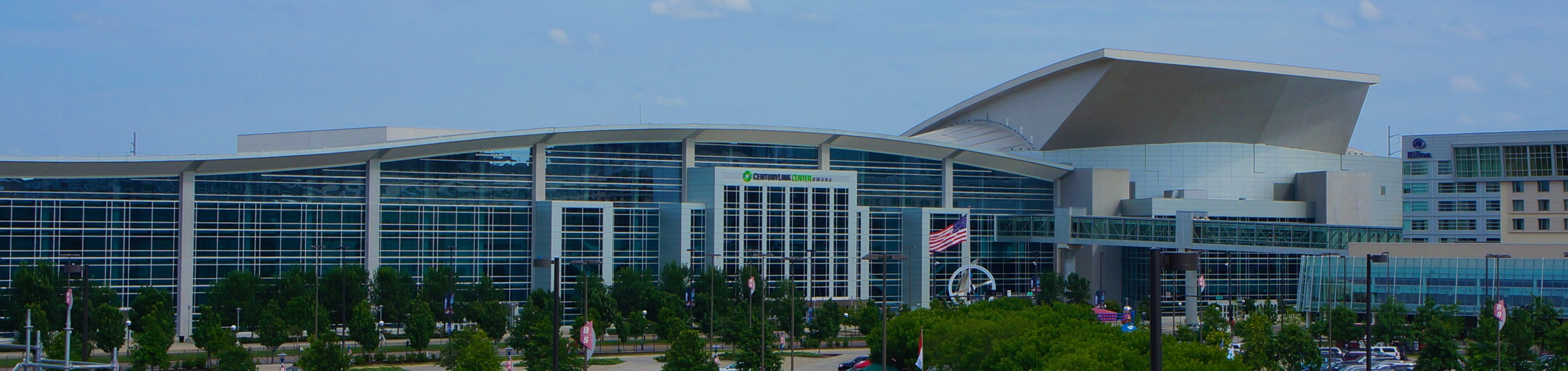
The CenturyLink Center Omaha held the final held the final

The 2015 FIVB Volleyball World Grand Prix was the 23rd edition of the annual women's international volleyball tournament played by 28 countries from 26 June to 2 August 2015. This was the first time that the Group 1 final round was held in Omaha, Nebraska, United States.

== Qualification ==
- All 28 teams of the 2014 edition directly qualified.
- South Korea withdrew from the tournament.
- Colombia qualified through the 2014 Pan-American Cup.

Africa	Asia and Oceania	Europe	North America	South America
Algeria; Kenya	Australia; China; Japan; Kazakhstan; Thailand	Belgium; Bulgaria; Croatia; Czech Republic; Germany; Italy Netherlands; Poland; Russia; Serbia; Turkey	Canada; Cuba; Dominican Republic; Mexico; Puerto Rico; United States	Argentina; Brazil; Colombia; Peru

== Format ==
- The second time, the World Grand Prix will feature 28 teams.
- During the Intercontinental Round, Pools A to O will play matches in three stand-alone tournaments, for a total of 9 matches per team. Pool P to S will feature two stand-alone tournaments, for a total of 6 matches per team.
- Six teams will qualify for the World Grand Prix Finals featuring the top five teams from all matches (if the hosts are one of the top five teams, then the sixth top team also participates).
- The last ranked team of Group 1 after the Intercontinental Round could be relegated if the winner of the Final Four of Group 2 can meet the promotion requirements set by the FIVB.

== Pools composition ==
The pools composition was announced on 1 December 2014.

Group 1			Group 2		Group 3	
Week 2					Week 1	
Pool A Thailand	Pool B China	Pool C Turkey	Pool J Croatia	Pool K Puerto Rico	Pool N Kazakhstan	Pool O Mexico
Brazil; Serbia; Japan; Thailand	China; Russia; Dominican Republic; Germany	Turkey; United States; Italy; Belgium	Argentina; Croatia; Netherlands; Czech Republic	Puerto Rico; Canada; Bulgaria; Poland	Kazakhstan; Algeria; Cuba; Australia	Kenya; Peru; Mexico; Colombia
Week 3					Week 2	
Pool D Brazil	Pool E Japan	Pool F Russia	Pool L Argentina	Pool M Bulgaria	Pool P Peru	Pool Q Algeria
Brazil; Thailand; Germany; Belgium	China; Japan; Dominican Republic; Italy	Turkey; Serbia; Russia; United States	Argentina; Canada; Netherlands; Poland	Puerto Rico; Croatia; Bulgaria; Czech Republic	Kazakhstan; Peru; Cuba; Colombia	Kenya; Algeria; Mexico; Australia
Week 4			Final round			
Pool G Italy	Pool H Hong Kong	Pool I Germany	Group 3 (Week 3) Australia	Group 2 (Week 6) Poland	Group 1 (Week 5) United States	
Brazil; Russia; Italy; Belgium	China; United States; Japan; Thailand	Turkey; Serbia; Dominican Republic; Germany	Australia; Colombia; Peru; Kenya	Poland; Netherlands; Czech Republic; Puerto Rico	United States; Brazil; China Italy; Russia; Japan	

== Competition schedule ==
●	Intercontinental round	●	Final round

	Week 1	Week 2	Week 3	Week 4	Week 5	Week 6
Group 1		18 matches	18 matches	18 matches	15 matches	
Group 2		12 matches	12 matches			4 matches
Group 3	12 matches	12 matches	4 matches			

== Squads ==
There are 25 players in team rosters. Maximum of 12 regular players and maximum of 2 liberos can be selected to play in each week. The full rosters of 25 players of each team can be seen in the article below.

== Pool standing procedure ==
1. Number of matches won
2. Match points
3. Sets ratio
4. Points ratio
5. If the tie continues as per the point ratio between two teams, the priority will be given to the team which won the last match between them. When the tie in points ratio is between three or more teams, a new classification of these teams in the terms of points 1, 2 and 3 will be made taking into consideration only the matches in which they were opposed to each other.

Match won 3–0 or 3–1: 3 match points for the winner, 0 match points for the loser Match won 3–2: 2 match points for the winner, 1 match point for the loser

== Intercontinental round ==
- All times are local.

=== Group 1 ===
==== Ranking ====
Pos	Team	Pld	W	L	Pts	SW	SL	SR	SPW	SPL	SPR	Qualification or relegation
1	Brazil	9	9	0	27	27	2	13.500	721	555	1.299	Group 1 Final round
2	China	9	9	0	26	27	5	5.400	770	569	1.353	Group 1 Final round
3	United States	9	8	1	24	26	9	2.889	822	731	1.124	Qualified as hosts for the Group 1 Final round
4	Italy	9	5	4	14	18	14	1.286	740	690	1.072	Group 1 Final round
5	Russia	9	5	4	14	16	17	0.941	730	746	0.979	Group 1 Final round
6	Japan	9	4	5	13	16	16	1.000	699	721	0.969	Group 1 Final round
7	Germany	9	4	5	13	15	17	0.882	733	692	1.059	
8	Serbia	9	3	6	12	17	19	0.895	796	775	1.027	
9	Thailand	9	3	6	8	11	21	0.524	667	726	0.919	
10	Belgium	9	2	7	6	8	21	0.381	571	692	0.825	
11	Turkey	9	2	7	5	10	23	0.435	690	783	0.881	
12	Dominican Republic	9	0	9	0	0	27	0.000	415	675	0.615	Relegated to Group 2

==== Week 2 ====
===== Pool A =====
- Venue: Indoor Stadium Huamark, Bangkok, Thailand

Date	Time		Score		Set 1	Set 2	Set 3	Set 4	Set 5	Total	Report
3 Jul	16:00	Thailand	3–2	Serbia	25–17	15–25	23–25	25–22	15–11	103–100	P2 P3
3 Jul	18:30	Brazil	3–1	Japan	21–25	25–21	25–17	27–25		98–88	P2 P3
4 Jul	14:00	Brazil	3–0	Serbia	25–20	25–15	25–19			75–54	P2 P3
4 Jul	16:30	Thailand	0–3	Japan	21–25	22–25	22–25			65–75	P2 P3
5 Jul	14:00	Japan	3–1	Serbia	25–22	18–25	28–26	25–23		96–96	P2 P3
5 Jul	16:30	Thailand	0–3	Brazil	23–25	18–25	13–25			54–75	P2 P3

===== Pool B =====
- Venue: Beilun Gymnasium, Ningbo, China

Date	Time		Score		Set 1	Set 2	Set 3	Set 4	Set 5	Total	Report
3 Jul	16:00	Germany	1–3	Russia	20–25	26–24	20–25	20–25		86–99	P2 P3
3 Jul	19:30	China	3–0	Dominican Republic	25–15	25–12	25–9			75–36	P2 P3
4 Jul	16:00	Dominican Republic	0–3	Russia	15–25	22–25	8–25			45–75	P2 P3
4 Jul	19:30	China	3–0	Germany	25–15	25–22	25–15			75–52	P2 P3
5 Jul	16:00	Dominican Republic	0–3	Germany	6–25	18–25	23–25			47–75	P2 P3
5 Jul	19:30	China	3–1	Russia	25–21	21–25	25–13	25–23		96–82	P2 P3

===== Pool C =====
- Venue: Başkent Volleyball Hall, Ankara, Turkey

Date	Time		Score		Set 1	Set 2	Set 3	Set 4	Set 5	Total	Report
3 Jul	16:00	United States	3–1	Italy	25–27	25–21	25–22	25–23		100–93	P2 P3
3 Jul	19:00	Turkey	0–3	Belgium	13–25	17–25	23–25			53–75	P2 P3
4 Jul	16:00	Italy	3–0	Belgium	25–15	25–17	25–20			75–52	P2 P3
4 Jul	19:00	Turkey	1–3	United States	20–25	25–17	16–25	21–25		82–92	P2 P3
5 Jul	16:00	Belgium	0–3	United States	19–25	20–25	18–25			57–75	P2 P3
5 Jul	19:00	Turkey	0–3	Italy	22–25	23–25	17–25			62–75	P2 P3

==== Week 3 ====
===== Pool D =====
- Venue: Ginásio do Ibirapuera, São Paulo, Brazil

Date	Time		Score		Set 1	Set 2	Set 3	Set 4	Set 5	Total	Report
10 Jul	14:05	Brazil	3–0	Belgium	25–17	25–16	25–14			75–47	P2 P3
10 Jul	16:00	Germany	0–3	Thailand	22–25	20–25	16–25			58–75	P2 P3
11 Jul	10:00	Brazil	3–1	Thailand	25–23	20–25	25–14	25–19		95–81	P2 P3
11 Jul	12:00	Belgium	1–3	Germany	19–25	25–23	21–25	15–25		80–98	P2 P3
12 Jul	10:00	Brazil	3–0	Germany	26–24	25–22	26–24			77–70	P2 P3
12 Jul	12:00	Belgium	1–3	Thailand	11–25	23–25	25–22	14–25		73–97	P2 P3

===== Pool E =====
- Venue: Saitama City Memorial Gymnasium, Saitama, Japan

Date	Time		Score		Set 1	Set 2	Set 3	Set 4	Set 5	Total	Report
10 Jul	16:10	China	3–0	Dominican Republic	25–15	25–12	25–19			75–46	P2 P3
10 Jul	19:10	Japan	2–3	Italy	15–25	25–23	27–25	24–26	12–15	103–114	P2 P3
11 Jul	15:10	China	3–1	Italy	25–21	20–25	25–16	25–19		95–81	P2 P3
11 Jul	18:10	Japan	3–0	Dominican Republic	25–19	25–12	25–15			75–46	P2 P3
12 Jul	15:10	Dominican Republic	0–3	Italy	13–25	15–25	19–25			47–75	P2 P3
12 Jul	18:10	Japan	1–3	China	11–25	25–21	15–25	17–25		68–96	P2 P3

===== Pool F =====
- Venue: DS Yantarny, Kaliningrad, Russia

Date	Time		Score		Set 1	Set 2	Set 3	Set 4	Set 5	Total	Report
10 Jul	16:40	Serbia	3–1	Turkey	25–18	21–25	25–14	27–25		98–82	P2 P3
10 Jul	19:10	Russia	0–3	United States	22–25	20–25	19–25			61–75	P2 P3
11 Jul	16:40	United States	3–1	Turkey	25–12	25–19	22–25	25–21		97–77	P2 P3
11 Jul	19:10	Russia	3–2	Serbia	25–23	17–25	20–25	26–24	15–8	103–105	P2 P3
12 Jul	16:40	Serbia	2–3	United States	18–25	26–24	28–30	25–19	9–15	106–113	P2 P3
12 Jul	19:10	Russia	3–1	Turkey	26–24	17–25	25–23	25–21		93–93	P2 P3

==== Week 4 ====
===== Pool G =====
- Venue: PalaCatania, Catania, Italy

Date	Time		Score		Set 1	Set 2	Set 3	Set 4	Set 5	Total	Report
16 Jul	17:10	Russia	0–3	Brazil	18–25	14–25	17–25			49–75	P2 P3
16 Jul	20:45	Italy	3–0	Belgium	25–17	26–24	25–14			76–55	P2 P3
17 Jul	17:10	Brazil	3–0	Belgium	25–14	25–17	25–23			75–54	P2 P3
17 Jul	20:25	Italy	1–3	Russia	18–25	25–20	22–25	28–30		93–100	P2 P3
18 Jul	17:10	Belgium	3–0	Russia	25–20	25–22	28–26			78–68	P2 P3
18 Jul	20:10	Italy	0–3	Brazil	17–25	24–26	17–25			58–76	P2 P3

===== Pool H =====
- Venue: Hong Kong Coliseum, Hong Kong, China

Date	Time		Score		Set 1	Set 2	Set 3	Set 4	Set 5	Total	Report
16 Jul	18:30	Japan	0–3	United States	23–25	22–25	24–26			69–76	P2 P3
16 Jul	20:30	China	3–0	Thailand	25–18	25–14	27–25			77–57	P2 P3
17 Jul	18:30	Thailand	1–3	United States	21–25	18–25	25–23	16–25		80–98	P2 P3
17 Jul	20:30	China	3–0	Japan	25–13	25–20	25–17			75–50	P2 P3
18 Jul	17:30	Japan	3–0	Thailand	25–19	25–21	25–15			75–55	P2 P3
18 Jul	19:30	China	3–2	United States	22–25	25–13	25–22	19–25	15–12	106–97	P2 P3

===== Pool I =====
- Venue: Porsche-Arena, Stuttgart, Germany

Date	Time		Score		Set 1	Set 2	Set 3	Set 4	Set 5	Total	Report
16 Jul	17:05	Turkey	0–3	Serbia	20–25	16–25	19–25			55–75	P2 P3
16 Jul	20:05	Germany	3–0	Dominican Republic	25–12	25–11	25–18			75–41	P2 P3
17 Jul	18:05	Germany	2–3	Turkey	25–20	26–28	29–31	25–14	16–18	121–111	P2 P3
17 Jul	21:05	Dominican Republic	0–3	Serbia	13–25	21–25	16–25			50–75	P2 P3
18 Jul	15:05	Dominican Republic	0–3	Turkey	20–25	17–25	20–25			57–75	P2 P3
18 Jul	18:05	Serbia	1–3	Germany	25–23	18–25	22–25	22–25		87–98	P2 P3

=== Group 2 ===
==== Ranking ====
Pos	Team	Pld	W	L	Pts	SW	SL	SR	SPW	SPL	SPR	Qualification or relegation
1	Netherlands	6	6	0	17	18	3	6.000	510	375	1.360	Group 2 Final round
2	Poland	6	4	2	12	13	8	1.625	480	472	1.017	Qualified as hosts for the Group 2 Final round
3	Czech Republic	6	4	2	12	15	10	1.500	563	521	1.081	Group 2 Final round
4	Puerto Rico	6	4	2	12	14	11	1.273	562	522	1.077	Group 2 Final round
5	Bulgaria	6	3	3	9	13	13	1.000	544	550	0.989	
6	Canada	6	2	4	5	9	15	0.600	506	550	0.920	
7	Argentina	6	1	5	4	7	16	0.438	476	548	0.869	
8	Croatia	6	0	6	1	5	18	0.278	442	545	0.811	Relegated to Group 3

==== Week 2 ====
===== Pool J =====
- Venue: Žatika Sport Centre, Poreč, Croatia

Date	Time		Score		Set 1	Set 2	Set 3	Set 4	Set 5	Total	Report
3 Jul	17:00	Netherlands	3–1	Czech Republic	25–17	23–25	26–24	25–18		99–84	P2 P3
3 Jul	20:00	Argentina	3–1	Croatia	25–19	26–24	15–25	25–16		91–84	P2 P3
4 Jul	17:00	Argentina	0–3	Netherlands	11–25	11–25	12–25			34–75	P2 P3
4 Jul	20:00	Czech Republic	3–0	Croatia	25–17	25–19	25–19			75–55	P2 P3
5 Jul	17:00	Czech Republic	3–1	Argentina	25–23	25–20	23–25	25–19		98–87	P2 P3
5 Jul	20:00	Croatia	0–3	Netherlands	17–25	11–25	13–25			41–75	P2 P3

===== Pool K =====
- Venue: Guillermo Angulo Coliseum, Carolina, Puerto Rico

Date	Time		Score		Set 1	Set 2	Set 3	Set 4	Set 5	Total	Report
3 Jul	17:10	Bulgaria	0–3	Poland	17–25	20–25	22–25			59–75	P2 P3
3 Jul	20:10	Puerto Rico	3–1	Canada	25–18	25–10	24–26	25–14		99–68	P2 P3
4 Jul	17:10	Bulgaria	2–3	Canada	25–18	14–25	14–25	25–20	13–15	91–103	P2 P3
4 Jul	20:10	Puerto Rico	3–1	Poland	25–19	21–25	25–19	25–18		96–81	P2 P3
5 Jul	16:10	Canada	1–3	Poland	18–25	25–20	26–28	17–25		86–98	P2 P3
5 Jul	19:10	Puerto Rico	2–3	Bulgaria	19–25	25–27	25–20	25–18	14–16	108–106	P2 P3

==== Week 3 ====
===== Pool L =====
- Venue: Estadio Cincuentenario, Formosa, Argentina

Date	Time		Score		Set 1	Set 2	Set 3	Set 4	Set 5	Total	Report
10 Jul	19:10	Poland	0–3	Netherlands	18–25	20–25	15–25			53–75	P2 P3
10 Jul	22:10	Argentina	1–3	Canada	25–22	23–25	14–25	29–31		91–103	P2 P3
11 Jul	19:10	Poland	3–1	Canada	25–20	19–25	25–17	27–25		96–87	P2 P3
11 Jul	22:10	Argentina	2–3	Netherlands	21–25	18–25	25–20	28–26	12–15	104–111	P2 P3
12 Jul	19:10	Netherlands	3–0	Canada	25–22	25–16	25–21			75–59	P2 P3
12 Jul	22:10	Argentina	0–3	Poland	21–25	23–25	25–27			69–77	P2 P3

===== Pool M =====
- Venue: Arena Samokov, Samokov, Bulgaria

Date	Time		Score		Set 1	Set 2	Set 3	Set 4	Set 5	Total	Report
10 Jul	16:10	Puerto Rico	3–2	Czech Republic	25–20	25–22	19–25	13–25	18–16	100–108	P2 P3
10 Jul	19:10	Bulgaria	3–2	Croatia	25–18	23–25	21–25	25–22	15–12	109–102	P2 P3
11 Jul	14:10	Croatia	1–3	Puerto Rico	25–23	16–25	23–25	17–25		81–98	P2 P3
11 Jul	16:40	Bulgaria	2–3	Czech Republic	23–25	25–18	17–25	25–18	11–15	101–101	P2 P3
12 Jul	14:10	Croatia	1–3	Czech Republic	12–25	25–22	21–25	21–25		79–97	P2 P3
12 Jul	16:40	Bulgaria	3–0	Puerto Rico	28–26	25–20	25–15			78–61	P2 P3

=== Group 3 ===
==== Ranking ====
Pos	Team	Pld	W	L	Pts	SW	SL	SR	SPW	SPL	SPR	Qualification
1	Colombia	6	5	1	15	16	4	4.000	482	402	1.199	Group 3 Final round
2	Peru	6	5	1	15	15	4	3.750	451	367	1.229	Group 3 Final round
3	Kenya	6	4	2	10	12	10	1.200	472	443	1.065	Group 3 Final round
4	Cuba	6	3	3	10	12	9	1.333	476	436	1.092	
5	Kazakhstan	6	3	3	8	9	11	0.818	416	437	0.952	
6	Algeria	6	2	4	7	10	14	0.714	482	521	0.925	
7	Mexico	6	2	4	6	8	15	0.533	453	512	0.885	
8	Australia	6	0	6	1	3	18	0.167	389	503	0.773	Qualified as hosts for the Group 3 Final round

==== Week 1 ====
===== Pool N =====
- Venue: Zhastar Sports Palace, Taldykorgan, Kazakhstan

Date	Time		Score		Set 1	Set 2	Set 3	Set 4	Set 5	Total	Report
26 Jun	13:00	Australia	0–3	Cuba	22–25	12–25	16–25			50–75	P2 P3
26 Jun	16:00	Kazakhstan	3–0	Algeria	25–23	25–17	25–20			75–60	P2 P3
27 Jun	13:00	Cuba	3–0	Algeria	25–19	25–18	25–16			75–53	P2 P3
27 Jun	16:00	Kazakhstan	3–0	Australia	25–20	25–21	25–8			75–49	P2 P3
28 Jun	13:00	Algeria	3–0	Australia	25–19	25–22	25–13			75–54	P2 P3
28 Jun	16:00	Kazakhstan	3–2	Cuba	25–16	12–25	26–24	21–25	15–13	99–103	P2 P3

===== Pool O =====
- Venue: Gimnasio Nuevo León, Monterrey, Mexico

Date	Time		Score		Set 1	Set 2	Set 3	Set 4	Set 5	Total	Report
26 Jun	18:10	Kenya	0–3	Peru	18–25	12–25	23–25			53–75	P2 P3
26 Jun	20:40	Mexico	0–3	Colombia	18–25	16–25	18–25			52–75	P2 P3
27 Jun	17:10	Peru	3–1	Colombia	25–19	19–25	25–21	25–19		94–84	P2 P3
27 Jun	19:40	Mexico	2–3	Kenya	16–25	25–20	25–21	17–25	9–15	92–106	P2 P3
28 Jun	16:10	Colombia	3–0	Kenya	25–21	25–14	25–20			75–55	P2 P3
28 Jun	18:40	Mexico	0–3	Peru	16–25	17–25	12–25			45–75	P2 P3

==== Week 2 ====
===== Pool P =====
- Venue: Coliseo Gran Chimu, Trujillo, Peru

Date	Time		Score		Set 1	Set 2	Set 3	Set 4	Set 5	Total	Report
3 Jul	16:30	Cuba	3–0	Kazakhstan	25–22	25–16	25–23			75–61	P2 P3
3 Jul	19:00	Peru	0–3	Colombia	17–25	17–25	23–25			57–75	P2 P3
4 Jul	14:30	Kazakhstan	0–3	Colombia	19–25	22–25	19–25			60–75	P2 P3
4 Jul	17:00	Peru	3–0	Cuba	25–23	25–21	25–20			75–64	P2 P3
5 Jul	15:30	Colombia	3–1	Cuba	25–14	21–25	25–20	27–25		98–84	P2 P3
5 Jul	18:00	Peru	3–0	Kazakhstan	25–12	25–16	25–18			75–46	P2 P3

===== Pool Q =====
- Venue: Salle omnisports Cheraga, Chéraga, Algeria

Date	Time		Score		Set 1	Set 2	Set 3	Set 4	Set 5	Total	Report
3 Jul	17:10	Mexico	0–3	Kenya	20–25	17–25	22–25			59–75	P2 P3
3 Jul	22:10	Algeria	3–2	Australia	25–18	25–23	21–25	20–25	15–10	106–101	P2 P3
4 Jul	17:10	Kenya	3–0	Australia	25–20	25–16	25–15			75–51	P2 P3
4 Jul	22:10	Mexico	3–2	Algeria	25–20	22–25	25–14	21–25	15–13	108–97	P2 P3
5 Jul	17:10	Australia	1–3	Mexico	18–25	25–22	19–25	22–25		84–97	P2 P3
5 Jul	22:10	Algeria	2–3	Kenya	25–20	15–25	25–23	13–25	13–15	91–108	P2 P3

== Final round ==
=== Group 3 ===
- Venue: AIS Arena, Canberra, Australia
- All times are Australian Eastern Standard Time (UTC+10:00).

==== Week 3 (Final four) ====
Semifinals
11 July
Peru	3
Colombia	0
11 July
Australia	1
Kenya	3

Final
12 July
Peru	1
Kenya	3
3rd place match
12 July
Colombia	3
Australia	0

===== Semifinals =====
Date	Time		Score		Set 1	Set 2	Set 3	Set 4	Set 5	Total	Report
11 Jul	16:10	Peru	3–0	Colombia	25–16	25–17	25–19			75–52	P2 P3
11 Jul	19:10	Australia	1–3	Kenya	25–18	16–25	20–25	14–25		75–93	P2 P3

===== 3rd place match =====
Date	Time		Score		Set 1	Set 2	Set 3	Set 4	Set 5	Total	Report
12 Jul	13:10	Colombia	3–0	Australia	25–12	25–22	25–16			75–50	P2 P3

===== Final =====
Date	Time		Score		Set 1	Set 2	Set 3	Set 4	Set 5	Total	Report
12 Jul	16:10	Peru	1–3	Kenya	25–21	17–25	22–25	23–25		87–96	P2 P3

=== Group 2 ===
- Venue: Hala Globus, Lublin, Poland
- All times are Central European Summer Time (UTC+02:00).

==== Week 6 (Final four) ====
Semifinals
1 August
Netherlands	3
Czech Republic	0
1 August
Poland	3
Puerto Rico	1

Final
2 August
Netherlands	3
Poland	0
3rd place match
2 August
Czech Republic	3
Puerto Rico	1

===== Semifinals =====
Date	Time		Score		Set 1	Set 2	Set 3	Set 4	Set 5	Total	Report
1 Aug	15:10	Netherlands	3–0	Czech Republic	25–21	25–14	27–25			77–60	P2 P3
1 Aug	18:10	Poland	3–1	Puerto Rico	25–21	21–25	25–16	25–23		96–85	P2 P3

===== 3rd place match =====
Date	Time		Score		Set 1	Set 2	Set 3	Set 4	Set 5	Total	Report
2 Aug	15:10	Czech Republic	3–1	Puerto Rico	25–18	12–25	25–21	25–17		87–81	P2 P3

===== Final =====
Date	Time		Score		Set 1	Set 2	Set 3	Set 4	Set 5	Total	Report
2 Aug	18:10	Netherlands	3–0	Poland	25–19	25–19	25–16			75–54	P2 P3

=== Group 1 ===
==== Week 5 (Final Six) ====
- Venue: CenturyLink Center Omaha, Omaha, Nebraska, United States
- All times are Central Daylight Time (UTC−05:00).

Pos	Team	Pld	W	L	Pts	SW	SL	SR	SPW	SPL	SPR
1	United States	5	5	0	15	15	2	7.500	410	325	1.262
2	Russia	5	3	2	9	10	6	1.667	383	353	1.085
3	Brazil	5	3	2	9	9	8	1.125	401	379	1.058
4	China	5	2	3	7	9	9	1.000	382	397	0.962
5	Italy	5	2	3	4	8	13	0.615	466	490	0.951
6	Japan	5	0	5	1	2	15	0.133	325	423	0.768

Date	Time		Score		Set 1	Set 2	Set 3	Set 4	Set 5	Total	Report
22 Jul	15:10	Brazil	3–1	China	23–25	25–20	25–16	25–14		98–75	P2 P3
22 Jul	17:40	Italy	0–3	Russia	24–26	26–28	19–25			69–79	P2 P3
22 Jul	20:10	United States	3–0	Japan	25–12	25–15	25–18			75–45	P2 P3
23 Jul	15:10	Brazil	0–3	Russia	19–25	26–28	19–25			64–78	P2 P3
23 Jul	17:25	China	3–0	Japan	25–20	25–19	25–12			75–51	P2 P3
23 Jul	20:10	United States	3–1	Italy	25–17	25–14	15–25	25–18		90–74	P2 P3
24 Jul	15:10	Brazil	3–0	Japan	25–21	25–23	25–16			75–60	P2 P3
24 Jul	17:15	China	2–3	Italy	15–25	25–22	25–22	18–25	12–15	95–109	P2 P3
24 Jul	20:10	United States	3–1	Russia	26–24	19–25	25–16	25–22		95–87	P2 P3
25 Jul	15:10	China	3–0	Russia	27–25	25–20	25–19			77–64	P2 P3
25 Jul	17:15	United States	3–0	Brazil	25–16	25–22	25–21			75–59	P2 P3
25 Jul	20:10	Italy	3–2	Japan	20–25	25–20	28–30	26–24	24–22	123–121	P2 P3
26 Jul	12:05	United States	3–0	China	25–23	25–19	25–18			75–60	P2 P3
26 Jul	15:10	Brazil	3–1	Italy	25–18	25–27	30–28	25–18		105–91	P2 P3
26 Jul	17:10	Japan	0–3	Russia	11–25	19–25	18–25			48–75	P2 P3

== Final standing ==
Rank	Team
1st place, gold medalist(s)	United States
2nd place, silver medalist(s)	Russia
3rd place, bronze medalist(s)	Brazil
4	China
5	Italy
6	Japan
7	Germany
8	Serbia
9	Thailand
10	Belgium
11	Turkey
12	Dominican Republic
13	Netherlands
14	Poland
15	Czech Republic
16	Puerto Rico
17	Bulgaria
18	Canada
19	Argentina
20	Croatia
21	Kenya
22	Peru
23	Colombia
24	Australia
25	Cuba
26	Kazakhstan
27	Algeria
28	Mexico

2015 World Grand Prix champions

United States
6th title

14-woman Roster for Group 1 Final Round
Kayla Banwarth, Courtney Thompson, Tamari Miyashiro, Lauren Gibbemeyer, Jordan Larson, Megan Hodge, Kelly Murphy, Christa Harmotto (c), Kimberly Hill, Foluke Akinradewo, Molly Kreklow, TeTori Dixon, Kelsey Robinson, Karsta Lowe
Head coach
Karch Kiraly

== Awards ==
- Most valuable player
  (United States) Karsta Lowe
- Best Outside Hitters
  (Brazil) Natalia Pereira
  (United States) Kelsey Robinson
- Best setter
  (United States) Molly Kreklow
- Best Middle Blockers
  (Brazil) Juciely Cristina Barreto
  (United States) Christa Harmotto
- Best libero
  (Russia) Anna Malova
- Best Opposite
  (Russia) Nataliya Obmochaeva

== Statistics ==
The statistics of each group follows the vis reports P2 and P3. The statistics include 6 volleyball skills, serve, receive, set, spike, block, and dig. The table below shows the top 5 ranked players in each skill plus top scorers as of 2 August 2015.

=== Best scorers ===
The best scorers determined by players who scored points from spike, block, and serve.

	GROUP 1		GROUP 2		GROUP 3	
Rank	Name	Points	Name	Points	Name	Points
1	(Turkey) Polen Uslupehlivan	159	(Puerto Rico) Karina Ocasio	123	(Peru) Angela Leyva	137
2	(China) Zhu Ting	157	(Canada) Tabitha Love	104	(Kenya) Mercy Moim	127
3	(Russia) Nataliya Obmochaeva	147	(Czech Republic) Michaela Mlejnkova	90	(Cuba) Melissa Vargas	121
4	(Germany) Maren Brinker	136	(Puerto Rico) Stephanie Enright	88	(Colombia) Amanda Coneo	105
5	(Thailand) Onuma Sittirak	136	(Czech Republic) Helena Havelkova	83	(Colombia) Cindy Ramirez	87

=== Best spikers ===
The best spikers determined by players who successfully spike in percentage (%success).

	GROUP 1		GROUP 2		GROUP 3	
Rank	Name	%succ	Name	%succ	Name	%succ
1	(China) Zhu Ting	54.10	(Netherlands) Judith Pietersen	57.89	(Cuba) Melissa Vargas	51.31
2	(United States) Karsta Lowe	51.37	(Netherlands) Lonneke Slöetjes	52.88	(Cuba) Jennifer Alvarez	50.52
3	(China) Hui Ruoqi	46.31	(Netherlands) Anne Buijs	49.54	(Colombia) Cindy Ramirez	47.89
4	(China) Zeng Chunlei	45.89	(Netherlands) Maret Grothues	44.34	(Kazakhstan) Sana Anarkulova	44.85
5	(Russia) Nataliya Obmochaeva	43.75	(Argentina) Leticia Boscacci	40.56	(Kenya) Brackcides Khadambi	41.78

=== Best blockers ===
The best scorers determined by players who had the most numbers of stuff block divided by numbers of sets which her team played (average stuff block/set).

	GROUP 1		GROUP 2		GROUP 3	
Rank	Name	Avg/set	Name	Avg/set	Name	Avg/set
1	(Brazil) Juciely Cristina Barreto	1.17	(Poland) Zuzanna Efimienko	1.38	(Kenya) Ruth Jepngetich	1.12
2	(Brazil) Ana Carolina da Silva	1.03	(Bulgaria) Mira Todorova	0.88	(Cuba) Daymara Lescay	1.05
3	(China) Xinyue Yuan	0.97	(Poland) Agnieszka Kąkolewska	0.81	(Australia) Sophie Godfrey	0.93
4	(Turkey) Kübra Akman	0.85	(Puerto Rico) Karina Ocasio	0.80	(Colombia) Daniela Montaño	0.92
5	(Belgium) Laura Heyrman	0.72	(Canada) Lucille Charuk	0.79	(Peru) Clarivett Yllescas	0.85

=== Best servers ===
The best scorers determined by players who had the most numbers of ace serve divided by numbers of sets which her team played (average ace serve/set).

	GROUP 1		GROUP 2		GROUP 3	
Rank	Name	Avg/set	Name	Avg/set	Name	Avg/set
1	(United States) Kimberly Hill	0.43	(Canada) Jennifer Lundquist	0.46	(Cuba) Melissa Vargas	0.71
2	(Belgium) Charlotte Leys	0.41	(Czech Republic) Michaela Mlejnkova	0.44	(Cuba) Jennifer Álvarez	0.62
3	(China) Xinyue Yuan	0.41	(Poland) Tamara Kaliszuk	0.43	(Peru) Carla Rueda	0.46
4	(Japan) Haruyo Shimamura	0.34	(Poland) Anna Grejman	0.43	(Algeria) Safia Boukhima	0.46
5	(Brazil) Dani Lins	0.31	(Poland) Aleksandra Sikorska	0.38	(Colombia) Yeisy Soto	0.42

=== Best setters ===
The best scorers determined by players who had the most numbers of running set divided by numbers of sets which her team played (average running set/set).

	GROUP 1		GROUP 2		GROUP 3	
Rank	Name	Avg/set	Name	Avg/set	Name	Avg/set
1	(Thailand) Nootsara Tomkom	9.13	(Bulgaria) Petya Barakova	5.15	(Algeria) Fatima Zahra Oukazi	7.38
2	(Brazil) Dani Lins	9.02	(Puerto Rico) Vilmarie Mojica	5.12	(Cuba) Yamila Hernandez Santas	7.33
3	(Japan) Chizuru Kotō	8.69	(Netherlands) Laura Dijkema	4.43	(Colombia) Maria Alejandra Marin	7.00
4	(China) Shen Jingsi	7.78	(Poland) Natalia Piekarczyk	4.09	(Mexico) Jazmin Hernandez	6.48
5	(Italy) Ofelia Malinov	6.13	(Canada) Jennifer Lundquist	3.79	(Peru) Zoila La Rosa	6.12

=== Best diggers ===
The best scorers determined by players who had the most numbers of excellent dig divided by numbers of sets which her team played (average excellent dig/set).

	GROUP 1		GROUP 2		GROUP 3	
Rank	Name	Avg/set	Name	Avg/set	Name	Avg/set
1	(Belgium) Valerie Courtois	3.00	(Puerto Rico) Debora Seilhamer	3.48	(Mexico) Lizeth Lopez	2.83
2	(Italy) Monica De Gennaro	2.38	(Poland) Aleksandra Krzos	3.24	(Peru) María Acosta	2.31
3	(Belgium) Els Vandesteene	2.14	(Bulgaria) Zhana Todorova	3.15	(Algeria) Nawal Mansouri	2.25
4	(Belgium) Charlotte Leys	2.10	(Puerto Rico) Aurea Cruz	2.20	(Kenya) Brackcides Khadambi	2.00
5	(Germany) Maren Brinker	2.00	(Canada) Tesca Andrew-Wasylik	2.17	(Colombia) Camila Gomez	1.96

=== Best receivers ===
The best scorers determined by numbers of excellent receive minus fault receive in percentage (%efficient).

	GROUP 1		GROUP 2		GROUP 3	
Rank	Name	%eff	Name	%eff	Name	%eff
1	(Brazil) Gabriela Guimarães	53.90	(Puerto Rico) Stephanie Enright	42.86	(Algeria) Nawal Mansouri	53.44
2	(Belgium) Charlotte Leys	52.76	(Puerto Rico) Aurea Cruz	41.72	(Algeria) Safia Boukhima	47.45
3	(Japan) Sarina Koga	49.49	(Bulgaria) Eva Yaneva	37.79	(Peru) Maguilaura Frias	47.18
4	(Italy) Lucia Bosetti	46.60	(Croatia) Senna Ušić	36.76	(Mexico) Lizeth Lopez	44.67
5	(Thailand) Malika Kanthong	37.97	(Czech Republic) Helena Havelkova	32.70	(Kenya) Mercy Moim	42.31
