= 2018 FIVB Women's Volleyball Challenger Cup qualification =

The 2018 FIVB Women's Volleyball Challenger Cup qualification was a series of tournaments to decide which teams would play in the 2018 FIVB Women's Volleyball Challenger Cup. The 2018 Challenger Cup featured 6 teams. Only one place was allocated to the hosts. The remaining 5 places was determined by a qualification process, in which entrants from among the other teams from the five FIVB confederations competed.

== Qualification summary ==
| Country | Confederation | Qualified as | Qualified on | Previous appearances | | | Previous best performance |
| Country | Confederation | Qualified as | Qualified on | Total | First | Last | Previous best performance |
|---|---|---|---|---|---|---|---|
| Australia^{a} | AVC | Asian qualifier 3rd place | 20 May 2018 | 0 | None | | None |
| Puerto Rico | NORCECA | North American qualifier champions | 20 May 2018 | 0 | None | | None |
| Colombia^{b} | CSV | South American qualifier runner-up | 27 May 2018 | 0 | None | | None |
| Peru | CSV | Host country | 15 June 2018 | 0 | None | | None |
| Bulgaria | CEV | 2018 Golden League champions | 17 June 2018 | 0 | None | | None |
| Hungary | CEV | 2018 Golden League runner-up | 17 June 2018 | 0 | None | | None |

Note
^a Australia replaced Kazakhstan, the Asian qualifier winners, who withdrew from the tournament.
^b Originally, a CSV representative was to face a team from Africa in a playoff for a spot in the Challenger Cup. According to the Chilean Volleyball Federation (FEVOCHI), however, FIVB fined the African Volleyball Confederation for not hosting any kind of qualifier event.

== Confederation qualification ==
=== AVC (Asia and Oceania) ===
- Venue: Baluan Sholak Sports Palace, Almaty, Kazakhstan
- Dates: 18–20 May 2018

==== Teams ====
- Australia (round robin → qualified)
- Chinese Taipei (round robin)
- Kazakhstan (round robin → qualified (withdrew))

==== Final positions (round robin) ====
| Pos | Team | Pld | W | L | Pts | SW | SL | SR | SPW | SPL | SPR | Qualification |
|---|---|---|---|---|---|---|---|---|---|---|---|---|
| 1 | Kazakhstan | 2 | 2 | 0 | 6 | 6 | 1 | 6.000 | 174 | 117 | 1.487 | 2018 FIVB Women's Volleyball Challenger Cup |
| 2 | Chinese Taipei | 2 | 1 | 1 | 3 | 4 | 3 | 1.333 | 150 | 157 | 0.955 | |
| 3 | Australia | 2 | 0 | 2 | 0 | 0 | 6 | 0.000 | 100 | 150 | 0.667 | |

=== CEV (Europe) ===
==== Teams ====
- Azerbaijan (Golden league)
- Belarus (Golden league)
- Bulgaria (Golden league → final round → qualified)
- Czech Republic (Golden league → final round)
- Croatia (Golden league)
- Finland (Golden league → final round)
- France (Golden league)
- Hungary (Golden league → final round → qualified)
- Portugal (Golden league)
- Slovakia (Golden league)
- Spain (Golden league)
- Ukraine (Golden league)

==== Golden league ====
| Qualified for the final round |
| Qualified as hosts for the final round |

Pool A

| Pos | Team | Pld | W | L | Pts | SW | SL | SR | SPW | SPL | SPR | Qualification |
|---|---|---|---|---|---|---|---|---|---|---|---|---|
| 1 | Bulgaria | 6 | 5 | 1 | 15 | 16 | 5 | 3.200 | 513 | 436 | 1.177 | Final round |
| 2 | Azerbaijan | 6 | 5 | 1 | 15 | 16 | 7 | 2.286 | 549 | 492 | 1.116 | |
| 3 | Ukraine | 6 | 2 | 4 | 6 | 8 | 13 | 0.615 | 483 | 491 | 0.984 | |
| 4 | Portugal | 6 | 0 | 6 | 0 | 3 | 18 | 0.167 | 397 | 523 | 0.759 | |

Pool B

| Pos | Team | Pld | W | L | Pts | SW | SL | SR | SPW | SPL | SPR | Qualification |
|---|---|---|---|---|---|---|---|---|---|---|---|---|
| 1 | Finland | 6 | 4 | 2 | 13 | 14 | 9 | 1.556 | 533 | 471 | 1.132 | Final round |
| 2 | Hungary | 6 | 4 | 2 | 12 | 15 | 9 | 1.667 | 536 | 508 | 1.055 | Final round as host country |
| 3 | Croatia | 6 | 3 | 3 | 8 | 12 | 12 | 1.000 | 529 | 549 | 0.964 | |
| 4 | France | 6 | 1 | 5 | 3 | 5 | 16 | 0.313 | 432 | 502 | 0.861 | |

Pool C

| Pos | Team | Pld | W | L | Pts | SW | SL | SR | SPW | SPL | SPR | Qualification |
|---|---|---|---|---|---|---|---|---|---|---|---|---|
| 1 | Czech Republic | 6 | 6 | 0 | 17 | 18 | 3 | 6.000 | 493 | 411 | 1.200 | Final round |
| 2 | Belarus | 6 | 3 | 3 | 8 | 12 | 13 | 0.923 | 531 | 535 | 0.993 | |
| 3 | Slovakia | 6 | 2 | 4 | 6 | 9 | 15 | 0.600 | 515 | 526 | 0.979 | |
| 4 | Spain | 6 | 1 | 5 | 5 | 8 | 16 | 0.500 | 482 | 549 | 0.878 | |

==== Final round ====
- Venue: László Papp Budapest Sports Arena, Budapest, Hungary
- Dates: 14–15 June 2018
- The finalists in the final round qualified for the 2018 FIVB Challenger Cup.

Semifinals
14 June
Bulgaria | 3
Finland | 0
14 June
Hungary | 3
Czech Republic | 0

Final
15 June
Bulgaria | 3
Hungary | 0
3rd place match
15 June
Finland | 1
Czech Republic | 3

=== CSV (South America) ===
- Venue: Manuel Bonilla Stadium, Lima, Peru
- Dates: 25–27 May 2018

==== Teams ====
- Chile (round robin)
- Colombia (round robin → qualified)
- Peru (round robin → qualified as host country)
- Venezuela (round robin)

==== Final positions (round robin) ====
| Pos | Team | Pld | W | L | Pts | SW | SL | SR | SPW | SPL | SPR | Qualification |
|---|---|---|---|---|---|---|---|---|---|---|---|---|
| 1 | Peru | 3 | 3 | 0 | 9 | 9 | 1 | 9.000 | 249 | 167 | 1.491 | Qualified as host |
| 2 | Colombia | 3 | 2 | 1 | 6 | 7 | 3 | 2.333 | 223 | 175 | 1.274 | 2018 FIVB Women's Volleyball Challenger Cup |
| 3 | Chile | 3 | 1 | 2 | 3 | 3 | 6 | 0.500 | 159 | 201 | 0.791 | |
| 4 | Venezuela | 3 | 0 | 3 | 0 | 0 | 9 | 0.000 | 137 | 225 | 0.609 | |

=== NORCECA (North America) ===
- Venue: Edmonton Expo Centre, Edmonton, Canada
- Dates: 17–20 May 2018

==== Teams ====
- Canada (first round → final round)
- Cuba (first round)
- Nicaragua (first round)
- Puerto Rico (first round → final round → qualified)
- Trinidad and Tobago (first round)

==== First round ====
| Qualified for the final round |

Pool A

| Pos | Team | Pld | W | L | Pts | SPW | SPL | SPR | SW | SL | SR | Qualification |
|---|---|---|---|---|---|---|---|---|---|---|---|---|
| 1 | Canada | 1 | 1 | 0 | 5 | 75 | 50 | 1.500 | 3 | 0 | MAX | Qualified for the final |
| 2 | Trinidad and Tobago | 1 | 0 | 1 | 0 | 50 | 75 | 0.667 | 0 | 3 | 0.000 | |

Pool B

| Pos | Team | Pld | W | L | Pts | SPW | SPL | SPR | SW | SL | SR | Qualification |
|---|---|---|---|---|---|---|---|---|---|---|---|---|
| 1 | Puerto Rico | 2 | 2 | 0 | 10 | 150 | 103 | 1.456 | 6 | 0 | MAX | Qualified for the final |
| 2 | Cuba | 2 | 1 | 1 | 5 | 137 | 107 | 1.280 | 3 | 3 | 1.000 | |
| 3 | Nicaragua | 2 | 0 | 2 | 0 | 73 | 150 | 0.487 | 0 | 6 | 0.000 | |

=== Final positions (final round) ===
- The winner qualified for a slot in the 2018 FIVB Women's Volleyball Challenger Cup

| Finals |
| 1 | Canada | 2 |
| 2 | Puerto Rico | 3 |
