= 2018 FIVB Women's Volleyball Challenger Cup qualification (NORCECA) =

The North American section of the 2018 FIVB Women's Volleyball Challenger Cup qualification acted as the qualifiers section for the 2018 FIVB Volleyball Women's Challenger Cup for national teams that were members of the North, Central America and Caribbean Volleyball Confederation (NORCECA). This tournament was held in Edmonton, Canada. The eventual winner earned the right to compete in the 2018 FIVB Women's Volleyball Challenger Cup.

== Qualification ==
6 NORCECA national teams entered qualification. Costa Rica withdrew before the tournament began.

- Canada
- ~~Costa Rica~~
- Cuba
- Nicaragua
- Puerto Rico
- Trinidad and Tobago

== Pool standing procedure ==
1. Number of matches won
2. Match points
3. Sets ratio
4. Points ratio
5. Result of the last match between the tied teams

Match won 3–0: 5 match points for the winner, 0 match points for the loser
Match won 3–1: 4 match points for the winner, 1 match point for the loser
Match won 3–2: 3 match points for the winner, 2 match points for the loser

== Round robin ==
- Venue: Edmonton Expo Centre, Edmonton, Canada
- All times are Canada Mountain Time (UTC−07:00).

=== Group A ===
Pos	Team	Pld	W	L	Pts	SPW	SPL	SPR	SW	SL	SR	Qualification
1	Canada	1	1	0	5	75	50	1.500	3	0	MAX	Qualified for the final
2	Trinidad and Tobago	1	0	1	0	50	75	0.667	0	3	0.000	

Date	Time		Score		Set 1	Set 2	Set 3	Set 4	Set 5	Total	Report
17 May	19:00	Canada	3–0	Trinidad and Tobago	25–12	25–16	25–22			75–50	Report

=== Group B ===
Pos	Team	Pld	W	L	Pts	SPW	SPL	SPR	SW	SL	SR	Qualification
1	Puerto Rico	2	2	0	10	150	103	1.456	6	0	MAX	Qualified for the final
2	Cuba	2	1	1	5	137	107	1.280	3	3	1.000	
3	Nicaragua	2	0	2	0	73	150	0.487	0	6	0.000	

Date	Time		Score		Set 1	Set 2	Set 3	Set 4	Set 5	Total	Report
17 May	16:30	Puerto Rico	3–0	Nicaragua	25–15	25–15	25–11			75–41	Report
18 May	16:00	Nicaragua	0–3	Cuba	12–25	10–25	10–25			32–75	Report
19 May	16:00	Cuba	0–3	Puerto Rico	23–25	22–25	17–25			62–75	Report

== 3rd place match ==
Date	Time		Score		Set 1	Set 2	Set 3	Set 4	Set 5	Total	Report
20 May	16:00	Trinidad and Tobago	0–3	Cuba	18–25	17–25	13–25			48–75	Report

== Final ==
Date	Time		Score		Set 1	Set 2	Set 3	Set 4	Set 5	Total	Report
20 May	19:00	Canada	2–3	Puerto Rico	25–22	17–25	19–25	27–25	8–15	96–112	Report

== Final standing ==
Qualified for the 2018 Challenger Cup

Rank	Team
1	Puerto Rico
2	Canada
3	Cuba
4	Trinidad and Tobago
5	Nicaragua
