= 2018 FIVB Women's Volleyball Challenger Cup qualification (AVC) =

The Asian section of the 2018 FIVB Women's Volleyball Challenger Cup qualification acted as the qualifiers section for the 2018 FIVB Women's Volleyball Challenger Cup for national teams that were members of the Asian Volleyball Confederation (AVC). This tournament was held in Almaty, Kazakhstan. The eventual winner earned the right to compete in the 2018 FIVB Women's Volleyball Challenger Cup .

== Qualification ==
3 AVC national teams entered qualification.

- Kazakhstan
- Australia
- Chinese Taipei

== Pool standing procedure ==
1. Number of matches won
2. Match points
3. Sets ratio
4. Points ratio
5. Result of the last match between the tied teams

Match won 3–0 or 3–1: 3 match points for the winner, 0 match points for the loser
Match won 3–2: 2 match points for the winner, 1 match point for the loser

== Round robin ==
- Venue: Baluan Sholak Sports Palace, Almaty, Kazakhstan
- All times are Almaty Time (UTC+06:00).

| Pos | Team | Pld | W | L | Pts | SW | SL | SR | SPW | SPL | SPR | Qualification |
|---|---|---|---|---|---|---|---|---|---|---|---|---|
| 1 | Kazakhstan | 2 | 2 | 0 | 6 | 6 | 1 | 6.000 | 174 | 117 | 1.487 | 2018 FIVB Women's Volleyball Challenger Cup |
| 2 | Chinese Taipei | 2 | 1 | 1 | 3 | 4 | 3 | 1.333 | 150 | 157 | 0.955 | |
| 3 | Australia | 2 | 0 | 2 | 0 | 0 | 6 | 0.000 | 100 | 150 | 0.667 | |

| Date | Time | | Score | | Set 1 | Set 2 | Set 3 | Set 4 | Set 5 | Total | Report |
|---|---|---|---|---|---|---|---|---|---|---|---|
| 18 May | 14:00 | Australia | 0–3 | Chinese Taipei | 17–25 | 20–25 | 21–25 | | | 58–75 | Report |
| 19 May | 14:00 | Kazakhstan | 3–0 | Australia | 25–12 | 25–17 | 25–13 | | | 75–42 | Report |
| 20 May | 14:00 | Kazakhstan | 3–1 | Chinese Taipei | 24–26 | 25–18 | 25–17 | 25–14 | | 99–75 | Report |
