= Tesca Andrew-Wasylik =

Canadian volleyball player (born 1990)

Personal information
- Nationality: Canada
- Born: 11 August 1990 (age 36); Unionville, Ontario
- Height: 1.73 m (5 ft 8 in)
- Spike: 292 cm (115 in)
- Block: 277 cm (109 in)

Volleyball information
- Number: 11

Tesca Andrew-Wasylik (born 11 August 1990) is a Canadian female volleyball player. She is a member of Canada women's national volleyball team. She was part of the Canadian national team at the 2014 FIVB Volleyball Women's World Championship in Italy, as well as at the 2015 FIVB World Grand Prix in the United States.
