= 2018 FIVB Women's Volleyball Challenger Cup qualification (CSV) =

The South America section of the 2018 FIVB Women's Volleyball Challenger Cup qualification acted as the qualifiers section for the 2018 FIVB Volleyball Women's Challenger Cup for national teams that were members of the Confederación Sudamericana de Voleibol (CSV). This tournament was held in Lima, Peru. The winners earned the right for a playoff against CAVB's contender.

== Qualification ==
4 CSV national teams entered qualification.

- Peru
- Chile
- Colombia
- Venezuela

== Pool standing procedure ==
1. Number of matches won
2. Match points
3. Sets ratio
4. Points ratio
5. Result of the last match between the tied teams

Match won 3–0 or 3–1: 3 match points for the winner, 0 match points for the loser
Match won 3–2: 2 match points for the winner, 1 match point for the loser

== Round robin ==
- Venue: Manuel Bonilla Stadium, Lima, Peru
- All times are Peru Time (UTC-05:00).

Pos	Team	Pld	W	L	Pts	SW	SL	SR	SPW	SPL	SPR	Qualification
1	Peru	3	3	0	9	9	1	9.000	249	167	1.491	Qualified as host
2	Colombia	3	2	1	6	7	3	2.333	223	175	1.274	2018 FIVB Women's Volleyball Challenger Cup
3	Chile	3	1	2	3	3	6	0.500	159	201	0.791	
4	Venezuela	3	0	3	0	0	9	0.000	137	225	0.609	

Date	Time		Score		Set 1	Set 2	Set 3	Set 4	Set 5	Total	Report
25 May	17:00	Colombia	3–0	Venezuela	25–10	25–12	25–17			75–39	
25 May	19:00	Peru	3–0	Chile	25–15	25–19	25–13			75–47	
26 May	17:00	Chile	0–3	Colombia	12–25	10–25	15–25			37–75	
26 May	19:00	Peru	3–0	Venezuela	25–16	25–12	25–19			75–47	
27 May	16:00	Venezuela	0–3	Chile	16–25	21–25	14–25			51–75	
27 May	18:00	Peru	3–1	Colombia	24–26	25–13	25–12	25–22		99–73	
