= Sophie Godfrey =

Australian volleyball player (born 1987)

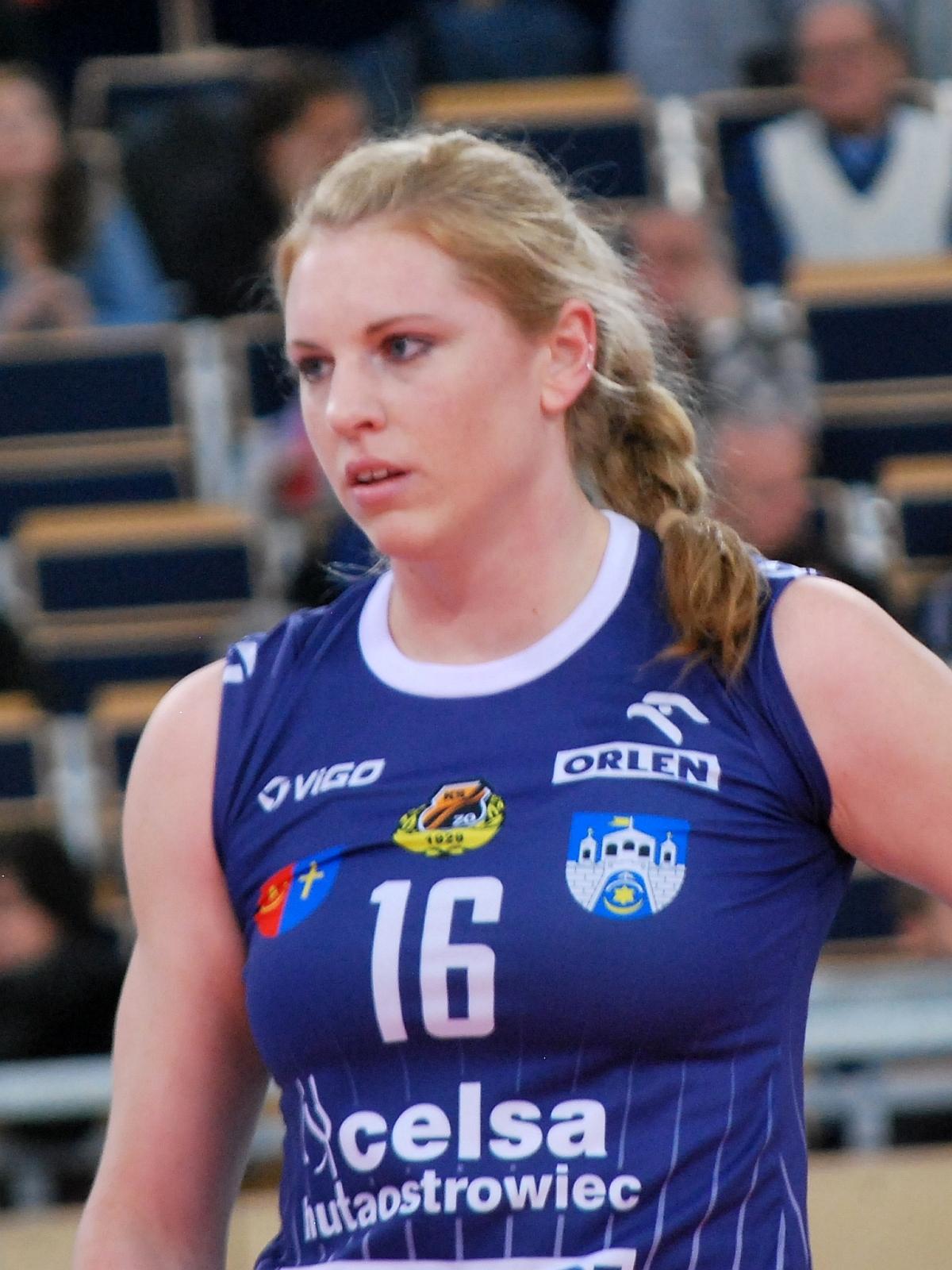

Personal information
- Nationality: Australian
- Born: 2 December 1987 (age 38)
- Height: 186 cm (73 in)
- Weight: 73 kg (161 lb)
- Spike: 295 cm (116 in)
- Block: 284 cm (112 in)

Volleyball information
- Number: 4 (national team)

Career
Years	Teams
2014	Ostrowiec

National team
2012 – present	Australia

Sophie Godfrey (born 2 December 1987) is an Australian volleyball player who plays for the Australia women's national volleyball team.

She participated in the 2014 FIVB Volleyball World Grand Prix. At the club level, she played for Ostrowiec in 2014.
