= Natalia Piekarczyk =

Polish volleyball player (born 1988)

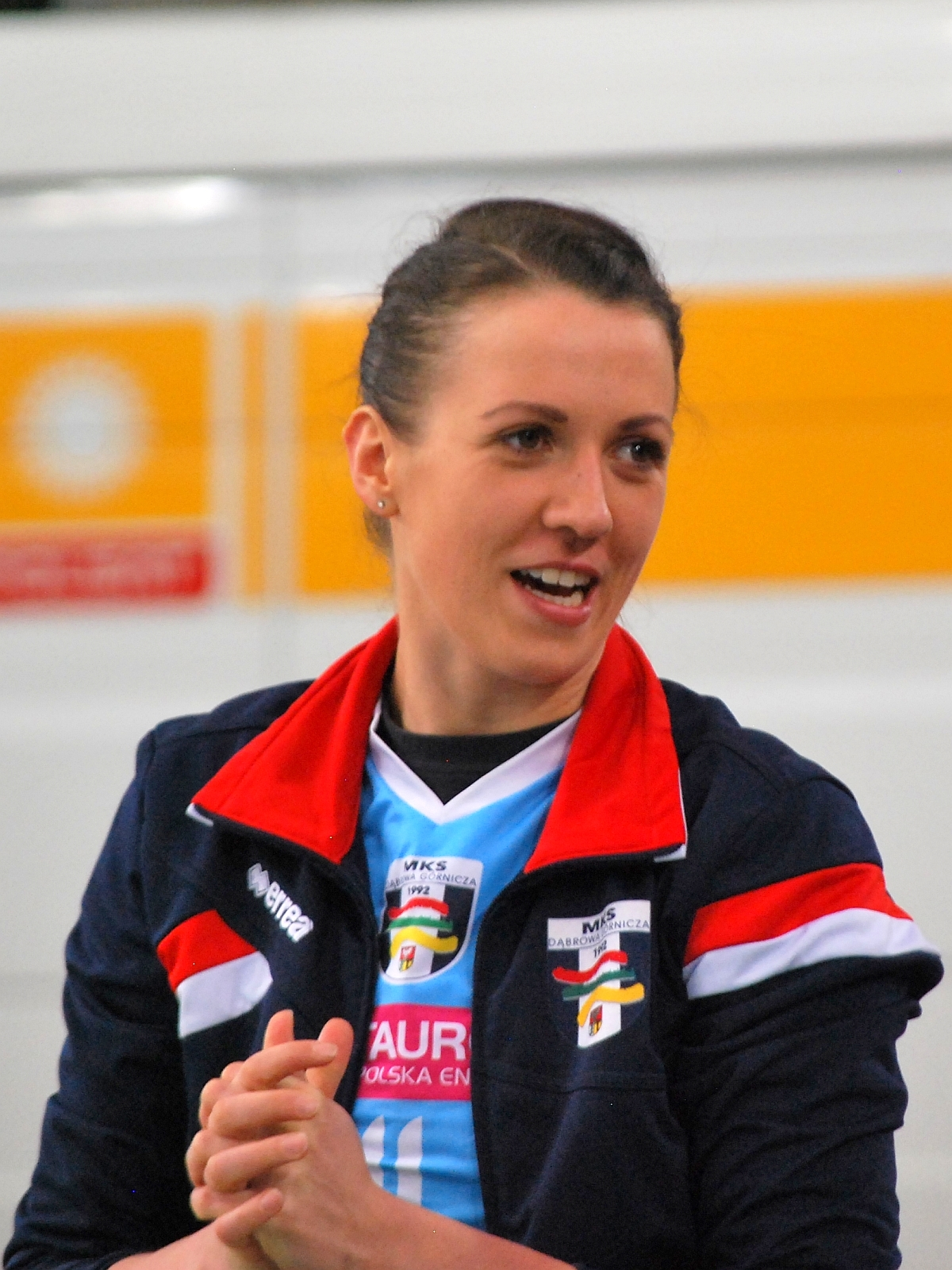

Personal information
- Nationality: Polish
- Born: 2 May 1988 (age 38)
- Height: 179 cm (70 in)
- Weight: 65 kg (143 lb)
- Spike: 296 cm (117 in)
- Block: 280 cm (110 in)

Volleyball information
- Number: 20 (national team)

Career
Years	Teams
2015	MKS Muszyna

National team
2015	Poland

Natalia Piekarczyk (born 2 May 1988) is a Polish volleyball player. She is part of the Poland women's national volleyball team. On club level she played for MKS Muszyna in 2015.
