= Lora Kitipova =

Bulgarian volleyball player (born 1991)

- Kitipova playing for ŽOK Železničar in 2025

Personal information
- Full name: Lora Kitipova
- Born: May 19, 1991 (age 35); Stara Zagora, Bulgaria
- Height: 1.83 m (6 ft 0 in)
- Weight: 66 kg (146 lb)

Volleyball information
- Position: Setter

Career
Years	Teams
2007–2011	CSKA Sofia
2009–2010	Levski Sofia (loan)
2011–2012	Igtisadchi Baku
2012–2013	Allianz MTV Stuttgart
2013–2015	Azerrail Baku
2016	Obiettivo Risarcimento Vicenza
2016–2017	VC Proton
2017–2018	VC Maritza
2018–2019	CSM Volei Alba-Blaj
2019–2020	VC Maritza
2020–2022	SC Prometey
2022–2023	VC Kuanysh
2023–2024	VC Maritza
2024	CSM Volei Alba-Blaj
2024–2025	Rapid București
2025–2026	OK Železničar
2026–	Maccabi XT Haifa

National team
2011–	Bulgaria

Lora Kitipova (Bulgarian: Лора Китипова; born 19 June 1991) is a professional Bulgarian volleyball player who plays as a setter. She has played for a dozen clubs and plays for the Bulgarian women's national volleyball team.

== Personal life ==
She was born in Stara Zagora, Bulgaria. Her mother, Larissa Kitipova, is a Russian head coach. Her sister, Aleksandra Kitipova (Sasha), is also a volleyball player.

== Career ==
Her ranking is 751, has played 478 matches in 97 tournaments and won 4 awards as of 2026.

She made her national team debut in 2011. She has represented Bulgaria in dozens of tournaments, both continental and global. Her team has won multiple international gold and bronze medals and one silver medal. She won the bronze medal in 2011, the silver medal in 2012, and bronze again in 2013 at the European League. She won gold at the Yeltsin Cup in 2014. In 2018, she won gold at the European Golden League and the Volleyball Challenger Cup. She won the gold medal in the European Golden League in 2021.

National team career
Years	Team	Competition	Rank
2025	Bulgaria	FIVB World Championship 2025	27th
2025	Bulgaria	Nations League 2025	13th
2021–2022	Bulgaria	FIVB World Championship 2022	17th
2021–2022	Bulgaria	Nations League 2022	14th
2021–2022	Bulgaria	European Championship 2021	9th
2021–2022	Bulgaria	European Golden League 2021	1st
2021–2022	Bulgaria	European Olympic Qualification 2021	6th
2021–2022	Bulgaria	World Olympic Qualification 2021	2nd
2011–2019	Bulgaria	European Championship 2019	8th
2011–2019	Bulgaria	Nations League 2019	16th
2011–2019	Bulgaria	FIVB World Championship 2018	12th
2011–2019	Bulgaria	Challenger Cup 2018	1st
2011–2019	Bulgaria	European Golden League 2018	1st
2011–2019	Bulgaria	European World Championship Qualification 2018	8th
2011–2019	Bulgaria	European Championship 2017	9th
2011–2019	Bulgaria	European Championship Qualification 2017	5th
2011–2019	Bulgaria	World Grand Prix 2016	16th
2011–2019	Bulgaria	European Championship 2015	13th
2011–2019	Bulgaria	European Games 2015	9th
2011–2019	Bulgaria	European Championship Qualification 2015	5th
2011–2019	Bulgaria	FIVB World Championship 2014	11th
2011–2019	Bulgaria	World Grand Prix 2014	21st
2011–2019	Bulgaria	Yeltsin Cup 2014	1st
2011–2019	Bulgaria	European World Championship Qualification 2014	1st
2011–2019	Bulgaria	European Championship 2013	13th
2011–2019	Bulgaria	World Grand Prix 2013	9th
2011–2019	Bulgaria	European League 2013	3rd
2011–2019	Bulgaria	European Championship Qualification 2013	3rd
2011–2019	Bulgaria	European League 2012	2nd
2011–2019	Bulgaria	European Olympic Qualification 2012	5th
2011–2019	Bulgaria	European Championship 2011	14th
2011–2019	Bulgaria	European League 2011	3rd
2009	Bulgaria U21	World Championships U21 2009	4th
2008	Bulgaria U20	Junior European Championship Qualification 2008	10th
