= Gergana Dimitrova (volleyball) =

Bulgarian volleyball player

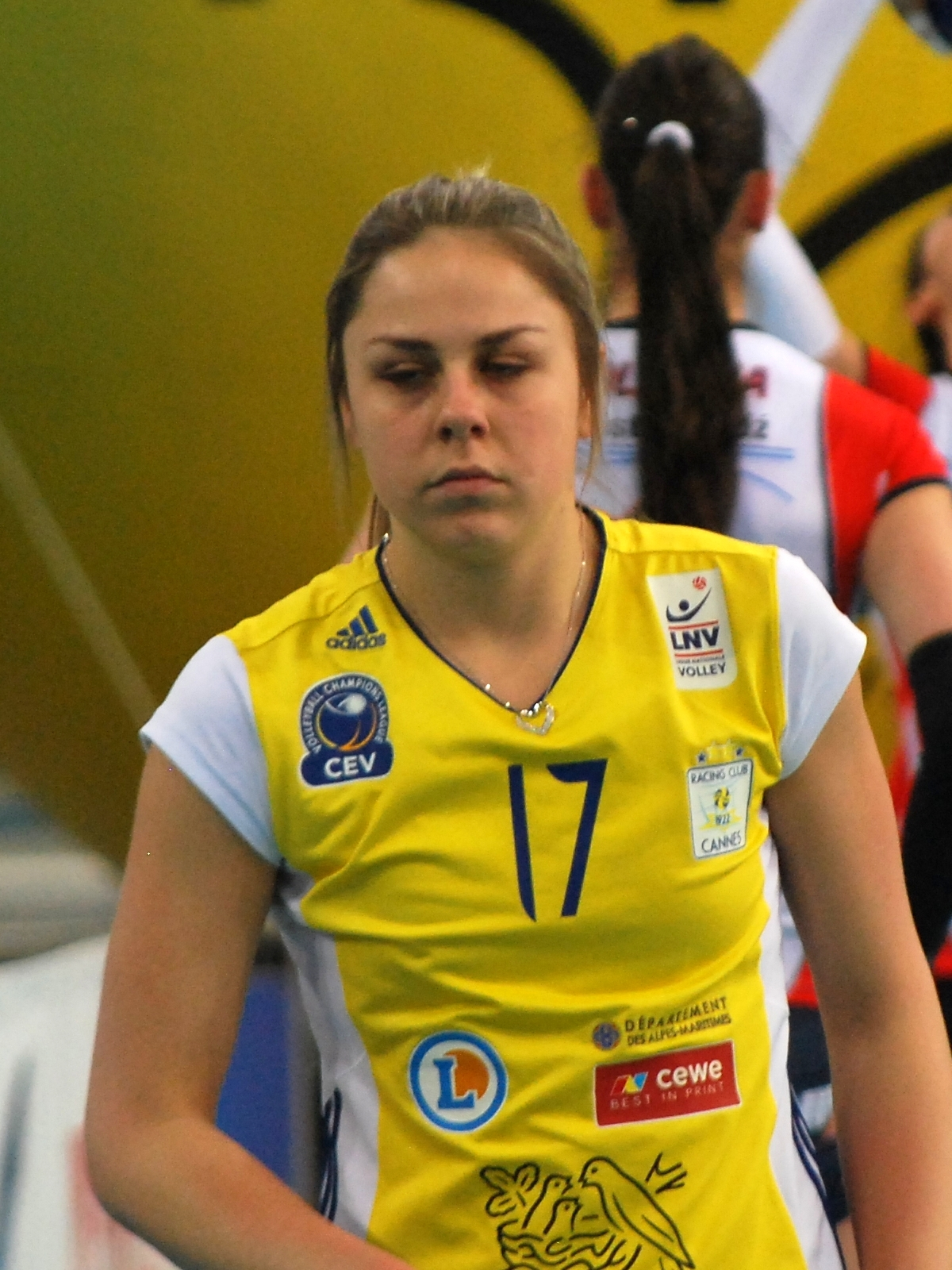
- Dimitrova in 2017

Personal information
- Full name: Gergana Dimitrova
- Nickname: Geri
- Nationality: Bulgarian
- Born: 28 February 1996 (age 30); Bulgaria
- Height: 1.84 m (6 ft 0 in)
- Weight: 73 kg (161 lb)

Volleyball information
- Position: Outside hitter

National team
Bulgaria

Gergana Dimitrova (Bulgarian Cyrillic: Гергана Димитрова; born 28 February 1996) is a Bulgarian volleyball player. She currently plays for Bulgaria as an outside hitter.

She competed at the 2017 FIVB Volleyball Women's U23 World Championship, 2015 FIVB Volleyball World Grand Prix, 2016 FIVB Volleyball World Grand Prix, 2015 European Games in Baku, and 2021 Women's European Volleyball League, winning a gold medal.

At club level she plays for RC Cannes in 2015.
