= Monika Krasteva =

Bulgarian volleyball player (born 1999)

Personal information
- Full name: Monika Krasteva
- Nationality: Bulgarian
- Born: 9 May 1999 (age 27); Kyustendil, Bulgaria
- Height: 1.83 m (6 ft 0 in)

Volleyball information
- Position: Opposite
- Current club: Levski Volley

National team
2018 -	Bulgaria

Monika Krasteva (Bulgarian Cyrillic: Моника Кръстева; born 9 May 1999) is an international volleyball player from Bulgaria.

She competed at the 2019 FIVB Volleyball Women's Nations League.

She currently plays for Bulgaria and Levski Volley as opposite.
