= Silvana Chausheva =

Bulgarian volleyball player (born 1995)

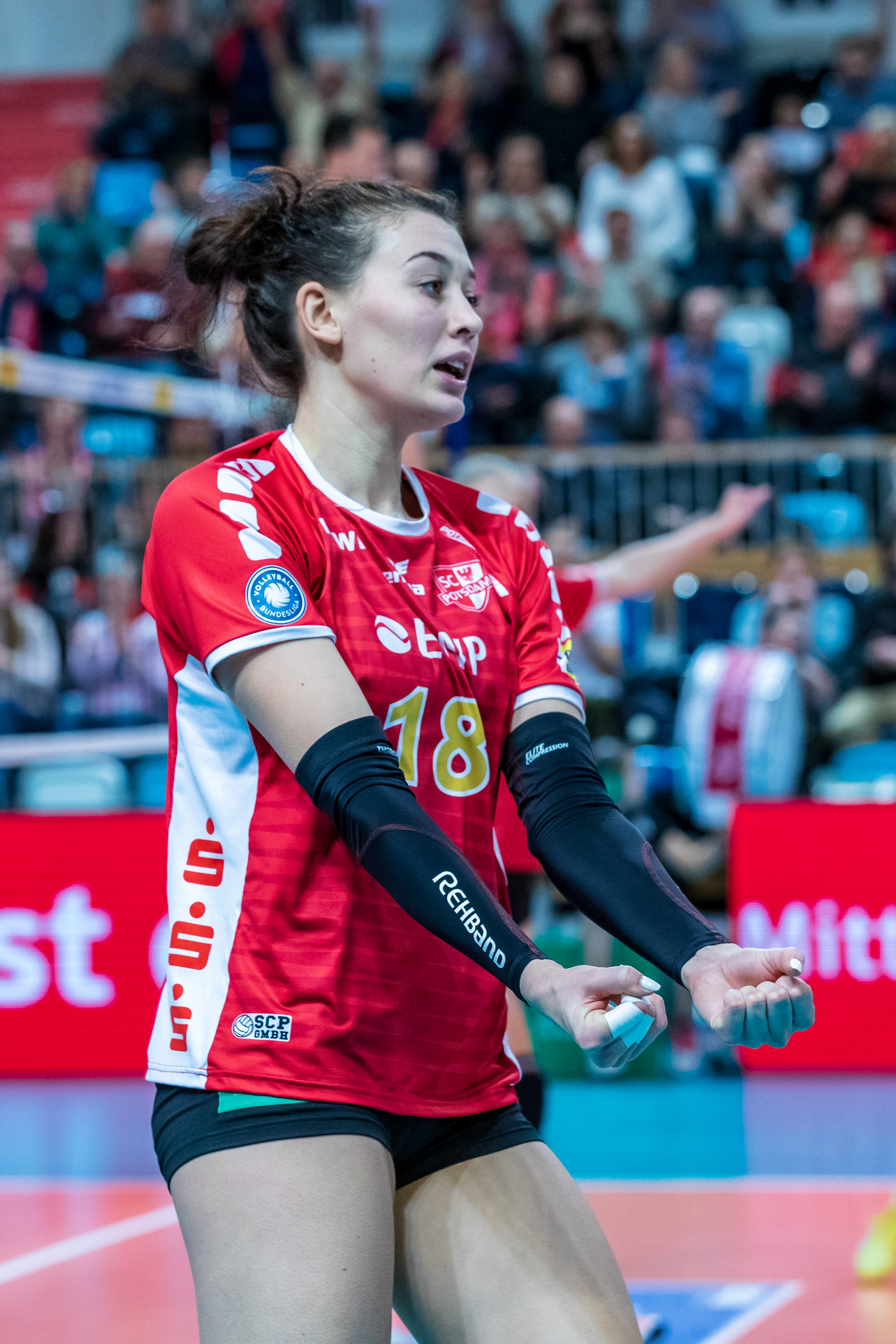
- Chausheva in 2018

Personal information
- Nationality: Bulgaria
- Born: 19 May 1995 (age 31)
- Height: 1.88 m (6 ft 2 in)
- Weight: 75 kg (165 lb)
- Spike: 305 cm (120 in)
- Block: 290 cm (110 in)

Career
Teams
	Bulgaria VK Maritsa Plovdiv

Silvana Chausheva (Bulgarian: Силвана Чаушева; born 19 May 1995) is a Bulgarian volleyball player, playing as an opposite. She is part of the Bulgaria women's national volleyball team, and participated at the 2015 FIVB World Grand Prix. and the 2015 Women's European Volleyball Championship, and 2017 FIVB Volleyball Women's U23 World Championship. On club level she plays for VK Maritsa Plovdiv.

== Clubs ==
- Bulgaria VK Maritsa Plovdiv 2017
- Italy Futura Volley Busto Arsizio 2018
- Germany SC Potsdam 2019
