= Petya Barakova =

Bulgarian volleyball player (born 1994)

Personal information
- Nationality: Bulgarian
- Born: 18 June 1994 (age 32)
- Hometown: Malo Konare
- Height: 178 cm (70 in)
- Weight: 70 kg (154 lb)
- Spike: 280 cm (110 in)
- Block: 265 cm (104 in)

Volleyball information
- Position: Setter
- Number: 8 (national team)

Career
Years	Teams
2015	Levski Siconco Sofia

National team
2015	Bulgaria

Petya Barakova (Bulgarian: Петя Баракова; born 18 June 1994) is a Bulgarian volleyball player, playing as a setter. She is part of the Bulgaria women's national volleyball team.

== Career ==
She competed at the 2015 European Games and 2015 Women's European Volleyball Championship. She participated at the 2015 U23 FIVB Volleyball World Championship, the 2015 FIVB Volleyball World Grand Prix, the 2016 FIVB Volleyball World Grand Prix. and 2021 Women's European Volleyball League, winning a gold medal.

On club level she plays for CS Volei Alba-Blaj.

== Awards ==
=== Clubs ===
- 2017–18 CEV Champions League - Runner-Up, with CSM Volei Alba Blaj
