= Mariya Karakasheva =

Bulgarian volleyball player (born 1988)

Personal information
- Nationality: Bulgarian
- Born: 27 October 1988 (age 38)
- Height: 182 cm (72 in)
- Weight: 68 kg (150 lb)
- Spike: 295 cm (116 in)
- Block: 290 cm (114 in)

Volleyball information
- Position: right side hitter

Career
Years	Teams
2018-	CSM Volei Alba Blaj

National team
Bulgaria

Mariya Karakasheva (Bulgarian: Мария Каракашева; born 27 October 1988) is a Bulgarian female volleyball player who is part of the Bulgaria women's national volleyball team and plays for CSM Volei Alba Blaj.

She participated at the 2009 Women's European Volleyball Championship, and at the 2013 FIVB Volleyball World Grand Prix.
