= Zhana Todorova =

Bulgarian volleyball player (born 1997)

Personal information
- Nationality: Bulgarian
- Born: 6 January 1997 (age 29)
- Height: 1.65 m (65 in)
- Weight: 56 kg (123 lb)
- Spike: 280 cm (110 in)
- Block: 270 cm (106 in)

Volleyball information
- Position: Libero
- Number: 15 (national team)

Career
- Years: Team
- 2013–2015 (?): VC Maritsa

National team
- Years: Team
- 2013–2015,2015-present: Bulgaria
Honours
Women's volleyball
Representing Bulgaria
U23 World Championship
Bronze medal – third place	2017 Ljubljana

Zhana Todorova (Bulgarian: Жана Тодорова; born 6 January 1997) is a Bulgarian volleyball player, playing as a libero. She is part of the Bulgaria women's national volleyball team.

== Career ==
She competed at the 2013 Women's European Volleyball Championship, the 2015 European Games, and 2021 Women's European Volleyball League, winning a gold medal.

At club level she played for VC Maritsa in 2015.
