= Mira Todorova =

Bulgarian volleyball player (born 1994)

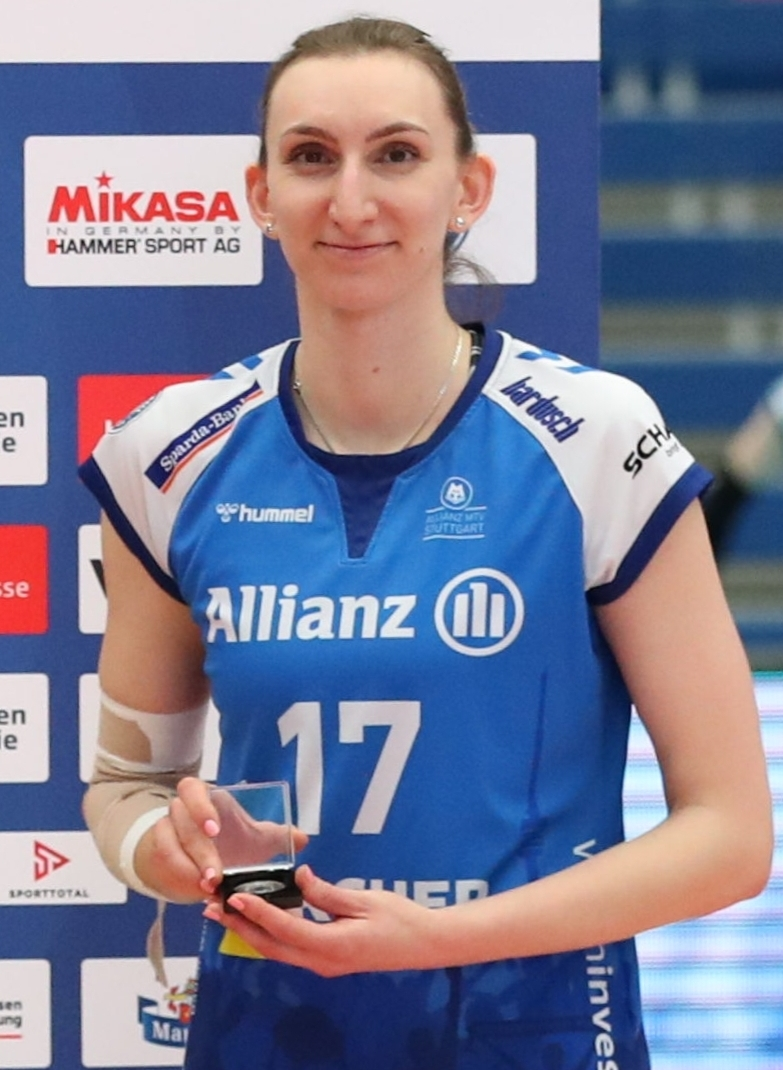

Personal information
- Nationality: Bulgarian
- Born: 12 April 1994 (age 32)
- Height: 190 cm (6 ft 3 in)
- Weight: 70 kg (154 lb)
- Spike: 312 cm (123 in)
- Block: 300 cm (118 in)

Volleyball information
- Position: middle blocker
- Number: 11

Career
- Years: Team
- 2014: Voléro Zürich

National team
- Years: Team
- 2014–2015: Bulgaria

Mira Todorova (Bulgarian: Мира Тодорова; born 12 April 1994) is a Bulgarian volleyball player.

She competed with the Bulgarian women's national volleyball team, at the 2021 Women's European Volleyball League, winning a gold medal, and 2022 FIVB Volleyball Women's Nations League.

With her club Voléro Zürich she competed at the 2014 FIVB Volleyball Women's Club World Championship.
