= 2019 FIVB Women's Volleyball Challenger Cup squads =

This article shows the rosters of all the participating teams at the 2019 FIVB Women's Volleyball Challenger Cup in Peru.

== Pool A ==
=== Peru ===
The following is the Peruvian roster in the 2019 FIVB Women's Volleyball Challenger Cup.

Head coach: Francisco Manuel Hervas Tirado

No.	Name	Date of birth	Height	Weight	Spike	Block	2019 club
1	Angelica Aquino	10 August 1990	1.7 m (5 ft 7 in)	65 kg (143 lb)	279 cm (110 in)	268 cm (106 in)	(Peru) Regatas Lima
3	Brenda Daniela Uribe	11 December 1993	1.85 m (6 ft 1 in)	63 kg (139 lb)	302 cm (119 in)	292 cm (115 in)	(Peru) Alianza Lima
4	Maricarmen Guerrero	17 January 1999	1.81 m (5 ft 11 in)	70 kg (150 lb)	290 cm (110 in)	280 cm (110 in)	(Peru) Univ. San Martin de Porres
5	Vanessa Palacios	3 July 1984	1.7 m (5 ft 7 in)	61 kg (134 lb)	275 cm (108 in)	260 cm (100 in)	(France) Marcq-en Baroeul
6	Alexandra Muñoz	16 August 1992	1.8 m (5 ft 11 in)	63 kg (139 lb)	287 cm (113 in)	281 cm (111 in)	(Peru) Club Deportivo Geminis
8	Maguilaura Frias	28 May 1997	1.86 m (6 ft 1 in)	71 kg (157 lb)	291 cm (115 in)	280 cm (110 in)	(Peru) Univ. San Martin De Porres
10	Zoila La Rosa	31 May 1990	1.74 m (5 ft 9 in)	57 kg (126 lb)	285 cm (112 in)	280 cm (110 in)	(France) Marcq-en Baroeul
11	Clarivett Yllescas	11 August 1993	1.85 m (6 ft 1 in)	63 kg (139 lb)	305 cm (120 in)	295 cm (116 in)	(Peru) Circolo Sportivo Italiano
12	Angela Leyva	22 November 1996	1.81 m (5 ft 11 in)	70 kg (150 lb)	312 cm (123 in)	300 cm (120 in)	(Peru) U. San Martín de Porres
15	Karla Ortiz (c)	20 October 1991	1.82 m (6 ft 0 in)	60 kg (130 lb)	300 cm (120 in)	290 cm (110 in)	(Peru) Regatas Lima
16	Leslie Leyva	6 December 1998	1.75 m (5 ft 9 in)	72 kg (159 lb)	300 cm (120 in)	280 cm (110 in)	(Peru) Univ. San Martin de Porres
20	Diana De La Peña	7 June 1999	1.87 m (6 ft 2 in)	60 kg (130 lb)	294 cm (116 in)	295 cm (116 in)	(Peru) Club Deportivo Geminis
21	Esmeralda Sanchez	1 September 1998	1.62 m (5 ft 4 in)	60 kg (130 lb)	263 cm (104 in)	252 cm (99 in)	(Peru) Alianza Lima
23	Thaisa Mc Leod	1 January 2002	1.89 m (6 ft 2 in)	75 kg (165 lb)	301 cm (119 in)	305 cm (120 in)	(Peru) Club Sporting Cristal

=== Czech Republic ===
The following is the Czech roster in the 2019 FIVB Women's Volleyball Challenger Cup.

Head coach: Ioannis Athanasopoulos

No.	Name	Date of birth	Height	Weight	Spike	Block	2019 club
1	Andrea Kossanyiova	6 August 1993	1.86 m (6 ft 1 in)	72 kg (159 lb)	310 cm (120 in)	300 cm (120 in)	(Czech Republic) VK UP Olomouc
3	Veronika Trnkova	13 October 1995	1.88 m (6 ft 2 in)	88 kg (194 lb)	314 cm (124 in)	300 cm (120 in)	(Czech Republic) VK UP Olomouc
4	Gabriela Orvosova	28 January 2001	1.91 m (6 ft 3 in)	76 kg (168 lb)	306 cm (120 in)	297 cm (117 in)	(Czech Republic) VK UP Olomouc
5	Eva Svobodova	6 May 1997	1.81 m (5 ft 11 in)	81 kg (179 lb)	310 cm (120 in)	285 cm (112 in)	(Czech Republic) Volejbal Prerov
8	Barbora Purchartova	9 May 1992	1.89 m (6 ft 2 in)	83 kg (183 lb)	309 cm (122 in)	300 cm (120 in)	(Czech Republic) PVK Olymp Praha
11	Veronika Dostalova	7 April 1992	1.7 m (5 ft 7 in)	66 kg (146 lb)	278 cm (109 in)	269 cm (106 in)	(Czech Republic) VK Dukla Liberec
12	Michaela Mlejnkova	26 July 1996	1.85 m (6 ft 1 in)	75 kg (165 lb)	305 cm (120 in)	298 cm (117 in)	(Czech Republic) KS Developers SkyRes Rzeszów
13	Tereza Patockova	2 August 1994	1.85 m (6 ft 1 in)	80 kg (180 lb)	310 cm (120 in)	300 cm (120 in)	(Czech Republic) VfB 91 Suhl
17	Nikola Vankova	7 January 1998	1.7 m (5 ft 7 in)	70 kg (150 lb)	287 cm (113 in)	275 cm (108 in)	(Czech Republic) Volejbal Prerov
18	Pavla Smidova C	12 November 1992	1.8 m (5 ft 11 in)	68 kg (150 lb)	297 cm (117 in)	290 cm (110 in)	(Czech Republic) PVK Olymp Praha
21	Kristyna Sustrova	10 November 2001	1.84 m (6 ft 0 in)	70 kg (150 lb)	304 cm (120 in)	285 cm (112 in)	(Czech Republic) VK Dukla Liberec
22	Eva Rutarova	14 September 1989	1.98 m (6 ft 6 in)	89 kg (196 lb)	317 cm (125 in)	305 cm (120 in)	(Czech Republic) VK Dukla Liberec
24	Katerina Holaskova	9 March 1991	1.89 m (6 ft 2 in)	79 kg (174 lb)	309 cm (122 in)	301 cm (119 in)	(Czech Republic) VC Kanti Scahffhause

=== Croatia ===
The following is the Croatian roster in the 2019 FIVB Women's Volleyball Challenger Cup.

Head coach: Daniele Santarelli

No.	Name	Date of birth	Height	Weight	Spike	Block	2019 club
1	Rene Sain	23 April 1997	1.6 m (5 ft 3 in)	55 kg (121 lb)	271 cm (107 in)	251 cm (99 in)	(Germany) VfB Suhl Lotto Thüringen
2	Nika Stanović	2 October 1993	1.8 m (5 ft 11 in)	68 kg (150 lb)	285 cm (112 in)	255 cm (100 in)	(Croatia) OK Kaštela
3	Ema Strunjak	24 September 1999	1.88 m (6 ft 2 in)	74 kg (163 lb)	301 cm (119 in)	294 cm (116 in)	(Italy) Volley Bergamo
4	Božana Butigan	19 August 2000	1.9 m (6 ft 3 in)	78 kg (172 lb)	303 cm (119 in)	294 cm (116 in)	(Croatia) HAOK Mladost
5	Nikolina Božičević	14 January 1995	1.6 m (5 ft 3 in)	62 kg (137 lb)	282 cm (111 in)	273 cm (107 in)	(Hungary) Vasas SC
6	Lara Štimac	18 August 2000	1.8 m (5 ft 11 in)	63 kg (139 lb)	295 cm (116 in)	285 cm (112 in)	(Croatia) HAOK Mladost
7	Katarina Luketić	28 September 1998	1.9 m (6 ft 3 in)	70 kg (150 lb)	310 cm (120 in)	299 cm (118 in)	(Croatia) HAOK Mladost
9	Lucija Mlinar	6 May 1995	1.8 m (5 ft 11 in)	70 kg (150 lb)	308 cm (121 in)	287 cm (113 in)	(Croatia) HAOK Mladost
11	Sanja Popović	31 May 1984	1.86 m (6 ft 1 in)	76 kg (168 lb)	291 cm (115 in)	283 cm (111 in)	(Poland) KPS Chemik Police
12	Beta Dumančić	26 March 1991	1.89 m (6 ft 2 in)	72 kg (159 lb)	294 cm (116 in)	285 cm (112 in)	(Germany) Schweriner SC
13	Samanta Fabris	8 February 1992	1.9 m (6 ft 3 in)	83 kg (183 lb)	325 cm (128 in)	306 cm (120 in)	(Italy) Imoco Volley
17	Lea Deak	27 April 2000	1.78 m (5 ft 10 in)	60 kg (130 lb)	270 cm (110 in)	245 cm (96 in)	(Croatia) HAOK Mladost
18	Karla Klarić	5 September 1994	1.88 m (6 ft 2 in)	86 kg (190 lb)	310 cm (120 in)	300 cm (120 in)	(Switzerland) Volero Zürich

== Pool B ==
=== Argentina ===
The following is the Argentinian roster in the 2019 Women's Volleyball Challenger Cup.

Head coach: Hernan Ferraro

No.	Name	Date of birth	Height	Weight	Spike	Block	2019 club
1	Elina Rodriguez	11 February 1997	1.89 m (6 ft 2 in)	72 kg (159 lb)	300 cm (120 in)	284 cm (112 in)	(Argentina) San Lorenzo
3	Paula Yamila Nizetich	27 January 1989	1.81 m (5 ft 11 in)	74 kg (163 lb)	305 cm (120 in)	295 cm (116 in)	(Italy) Pesaro A1
4	Daniela Bulaich Simian	5 September 1997	1.72 m (5 ft 8 in)	53 kg (117 lb)	274 cm (108 in)	263 cm (104 in)	(Argentina) San Lorenzo
5	Lucia Fresco	14 May 1991	1.95 m (6 ft 5 in)	92 kg (203 lb)	304 cm (120 in)	290 cm (110 in)	(Hungary) Bekescsabai
6	Erika Mercado	27 February 1992	1.89 m (6 ft 2 in)	70 kg (150 lb)	297 cm (117 in)	290 cm (110 in)	(Argentina) GELP
8	Agnes Victoria Michel Tosi	1 July 1999	1.82 m (6 ft 0 in)	69 kg (152 lb)	283 cm (111 in)	273 cm (107 in)	(Argentina) San Lorenzo
10	Tatiana Vera	26 March 1993	1.73 m (5 ft 8 in)	70 kg (150 lb)	295 cm (116 in)	282 cm (111 in)	(Argentina) GELP
11	Julieta Constanza Lazcano (c)	25 July 1989	1.9 m (6 ft 3 in)	76 kg (168 lb)	312 cm (123 in)	293 cm (115 in)	(France) Saint Raphael
12	Tatiana Soledad Rizzo	30 December 1986	1.78 m (5 ft 10 in)	64 kg (141 lb)	280 cm (110 in)	268 cm (106 in)	(Argentina) Boca Juniors
15	Antonela Fortuna	10 May 1995	1.75 m (5 ft 9 in)	61 kg (134 lb)	285 cm (112 in)	275 cm (108 in)	(Argentina) San Lorenzo
16	Camila Hiruela Tapia	1 February 1997	1.76 m (5 ft 9 in)	77 kg (170 lb)	287 cm (113 in)	280 cm (110 in)	(Argentina) UTE
17	Candelaria Lucia Herrera Rodriguez	28 January 1999	1.82 m (6 ft 0 in)	71 kg (157 lb)	290 cm (110 in)	275 cm (108 in)	(Argentina) UNIVERSIDAD DE SAN JUAN
18	Valentina Andrea Gonzalez	23 February 1998	1.63 m (5 ft 4 in)	56 kg (123 lb)	271 cm (107 in)	260 cm (100 in)	(Argentina) Estudiantes de La Plata
20	Valentina Galiano	12 August 1989	1.68 m (5 ft 6 in)	74 kg (163 lb)	293 cm (115 in)	280 cm (110 in)	(Argentina) Boca Juniors

=== Canada ===
The following is the Canadian roster in the 2019 FIVB Women's Volleyball Challenger Cup.

Head coach: Thomas Black

No.	Name	Date of birth	Height	Weight	Spike	Block	2019 club
1	Jessica Niles	14 July 1993	1.76 m (5 ft 9 in)	61 kg (134 lb)	287 cm (113 in)	278 cm (109 in)	(Canada) ATSC Kelag Wildcats
2	Autumn Bailey	2 June 1995	1.78 m (5 ft 10 in)	80 kg (180 lb)	300 cm (120 in)	280 cm (110 in)	(United States) Michigan State
3	Kiera Van Ryk	6 January 1999	1.88 m (6 ft 2 in)	85 kg (187 lb)	302 cm (119 in)	288 cm (113 in)	(Canada) University of British Columbia
4	Kyla Richey (c)	20 June 1989	1.88 m (6 ft 2 in)	83 kg (183 lb)	309 cm (122 in)	292 cm (115 in)	(Indonesia) Jakarta Pertamina Energi
5	Danielle Smith	29 April 1990	1.78 m (5 ft 10 in)	68 kg (150 lb)	291 cm (115 in)	277 cm (109 in)	(Romania) CSM Targoviste
8	Alicia Ogoms	2 April 1994	1.94 m (6 ft 4 in)	82 kg (181 lb)	315 cm (124 in)	305 cm (120 in)	(Italy) SAB Volley
9	Alexa Lea Gray	7 August 1994	1.85 m (6 ft 1 in)	75 kg (165 lb)	323 cm (127 in)	215 cm (85 in)	(Italy) Volley Soverato SRL
11	Andrea Mitrovic	3 June 1999	1.87 m (6 ft 2 in)	70 kg (150 lb)	320 cm (130 in)	307 cm (121 in)	(United States) Arizona State University
12	Jennifer Cross	4 July 1992	1.95 m (6 ft 5 in)	81 kg (179 lb)	315 cm (124 in)	296 cm (117 in)	(Hungary) UTE Profisport Szolgaltato
16	Shainah Joseph	15 May 1995	1.83 m (6 ft 0 in)	78 kg (172 lb)	329 cm (130 in)	292 cm (115 in)	(Bulgaria) Volley Martiza
17	Kristen Moncks	31 July 1992	1.73 m (5 ft 8 in)	66 kg (146 lb)	290 cm (110 in)	274 cm (108 in)	Team Canada
20	Alicia Perrin	1 June 1992	1.88 m (6 ft 2 in)	84 kg (185 lb)	305 cm (120 in)	286 cm (113 in)	(Peru) Universidad San Martin de Porr
22	Megan Cyr	1 June 1990	1.82 m (6 ft 0 in)	75 kg (165 lb)	297 cm (117 in)	282 cm (111 in)	(Greece) AO Thiras
23	Emily Maglio	13 November 1996	1.89 m (6 ft 2 in)	82 kg (181 lb)	318 cm (125 in)	302 cm (119 in)	(United States) University of Hawai

=== Chinese Taipei ===
The following is the Taipei roster in the 2019 FIVB Women's Volleyball Challenger Cup.

Head coach: Koji Tsuzurabara

No.	Name	Date of birth	Height	Weight	Spike	Block	2019 club
1	Xiang-Chen Lai	19 March 1995	1.52 m (5 ft 0 in)	50 kg (110 lb)	252 cm (99 in)	245 cm (96 in)	(Chinese Taipei) CMFC
2	Li-Wen Chang (c)	27 February 1995	1.75 m (5 ft 9 in)	57 kg (126 lb)	285 cm (112 in)	275 cm (108 in)	(Chinese Taipei) CMFC
3	Wan -Ling Tseng	13 May 1996	1.71 m (5 ft 7 in)	67 kg (148 lb)	295 cm (116 in)	285 cm (112 in)	(Chinese Taipei) TAIPOWER
4	Yi Ching Lo	16 September 1997	1.6 m (5 ft 3 in)	57 kg (126 lb)	255 cm (100 in)	245 cm (96 in)	(Chinese Taipei) CMFC
7	Hsin-Yu Huang	25 February 1998	1.78 m (5 ft 10 in)	56 kg (123 lb)	300 cm (120 in)	290 cm (110 in)	(Chinese Taipei) TAIPOWER
8	Ya Hui Chiu	4 April 1998	1.8 m (5 ft 11 in)	64 kg (141 lb)	300 cm (120 in)	290 cm (110 in)	(Chinese Taipei) CMFC
9	Jia Man Chen	27 July 1999	1.67 m (5 ft 6 in)	57 kg (126 lb)	273 cm (107 in)	270 cm (110 in)	(Chinese Taipei) ATTACKLINE
12	Yi-Jen Liao	8 June 1997	1.65 m (5 ft 5 in)	53 kg (117 lb)	268 cm (106 in)	256 cm (101 in)	(Chinese Taipei) CMFC
13	Tsai Qin-Yao	20 September 1998	1.76 m (5 ft 9 in)	71 kg (157 lb)	290 cm (110 in)	283 cm (111 in)	(Chinese Taipei) ATTACKLINE
15	Shu-Ho Lin	6 February 1999	1.67 m (5 ft 6 in)	62 kg (137 lb)	272 cm (107 in)	262 cm (103 in)	(Chinese Taipei) TOP SPEED
16	Tzu Ya Chen	26 August 1997	1.77 m (5 ft 10 in)	62 kg (137 lb)	276 cm (109 in)	266 cm (105 in)	(Chinese Taipei) CMFC
20	Shuang Ling Liu	4 April 2000	1.75 m (5 ft 9 in)	66 kg (146 lb)	295 cm (116 in)	288 cm (113 in)	(Chinese Taipei) TOP SPEED
