= 2018 FIVB Women's Volleyball World Championship squads =

This article shows the roster of all participating teams at the 2018 FIVB Women's Volleyball World Championship.

== Pool A ==
=== Argentina ===
The following is the Argentinian roster in the 2018 World Championship.

Head coach: Guillermo Orduna

No.	Name	Date of birth	Height	Weight	Spike	Block	2017–18 club
2	Agostina Soria	9 October 1998	1.79 m (5 ft 10 in)	65 kg (143 lb)	279 cm (110 in)	271 cm (107 in)	(Argentina) Vélez Sarsfield
4	Anahi Tosi	10 July 1998	1.81 m (5 ft 11 in)	60 kg (130 lb)	290 cm (110 in)	272 cm (107 in)	(Argentina) 9 de Julio
5	Lucía Fresco	14 May 1991	1.95 m (6 ft 5 in)	88 kg (194 lb)	322 cm (127 in)	316 cm (124 in)	(Hungary) Békéscsabai RSE
6	Elina Rodríguez	11 February 1997	1.89 m (6 ft 2 in)	72 kg (159 lb)	300 cm (120 in)	284 cm (112 in)	(Argentina) San Lorenzo
9	Clarisa Sagardía	29 June 1989	1.74 m (5 ft 9 in)	67 kg (148 lb)	290 cm (110 in)	280 cm (110 in)	(Greece) Makedones
10	Emilce Sosa (c)	11 September 1987	1.77 m (5 ft 10 in)	75 kg (165 lb)	305 cm (120 in)	295 cm (116 in)	(Brazil) São Caetano
11	Julieta Lazcano	25 June 1989	1.90 m (6 ft 3 in)	74 kg (163 lb)	312 cm (123 in)	293 cm (115 in)	(France) Saint-Cloud Paris
12	Tatiana Rizzo	30 December 1986	1.78 m (5 ft 10 in)	64 kg (141 lb)	280 cm (110 in)	268 cm (106 in)	(Argentina) Boca Juniors
14	Josefina Fernández	17 August 1991	1.80 m (5 ft 11 in)	69 kg (152 lb)	300 cm (120 in)	296 cm (117 in)	(Hungary) Fatum Nyíregyháza
15	Antonela Fortuna	10 May 1995	1.75 m (5 ft 9 in)	61 kg (134 lb)	285 cm (112 in)	275 cm (108 in)	(Argentina) San Lorenzo
16	Florencia Busquets	27 June 1989	1.92 m (6 ft 4 in)	68 kg (150 lb)	305 cm (120 in)	290 cm (110 in)	(Switzerland) Franches-Montagnes
19	Morena Franchi	19 February 1993	1.64 m (5 ft 5 in)	62 kg (137 lb)	285 cm (112 in)	264 cm (104 in)	(Poland) Budowlani Toruń
20	Valentina Galiano	12 August 1989	1.68 m (5 ft 6 in)	74 kg (163 lb)	293 cm (115 in)	280 cm (110 in)	(Argentina) Boca Juniors
23	Victoria Michel Tosi	1 July 1999	1.82 m (6 ft 0 in)	69 kg (152 lb)	283 cm (111 in)	273 cm (107 in)	(Argentina) Echagüe

=== Cameroon ===
The following is the Cameroonian roster in the 2018 World Championship.

Head coach: Jean-René Akono

No.	Name	Date of birth	Height	Weight	Spike	Block	2017–18 club
1	Stéphanie Fotso Mogoung	25 September 1987	1.87 m (6 ft 2 in)	78 kg (172 lb)	301 cm (119 in)	275 cm (108 in)	(France) VC Harnes
2	Christelle Nana Tchoudjang (c)	7 July 1989	1.84 m (6 ft 0 in)	80 kg (180 lb)	308 cm (121 in)	285 cm (112 in)	(France) VBC Chamalières
3	Théorine Aboa Mbeza	25 August 1992	1.82 m (6 ft 0 in)	78 kg (172 lb)	294 cm (116 in)	275 cm (108 in)	(Cameroon) FAP VB
6	Laetitia Moma Bassoko	9 October 1993	1.84 m (6 ft 0 in)	81 kg (179 lb)	301 cm (119 in)	281 cm (111 in)	(France) VC Marcq-en-Barœul
7	Henriette Koulla	14 September 1992	1.71 m (5 ft 7 in)	67 kg (148 lb)	280 cm (110 in)	264 cm (104 in)	(France) Tremblay AC
9	Honorine Djakao Gamkoua	27 February 1992	1.72 m (5 ft 8 in)	65 kg (143 lb)	280 cm (110 in)	270 cm (110 in)	(Cameroon) FAP VB
10	Berthrade Bikatal	23 July 1992	1.83 m (6 ft 0 in)	76 kg (168 lb)	297 cm (117 in)	253 cm (100 in)	(France) CEP Poitiers Saint-Benoît VB
11	Victoire L'or Ngon Ntame	31 December 1985	1.77 m (5 ft 10 in)	79 kg (174 lb)	288 cm (113 in)	253 cm (100 in)	(Cameroon) INJS VB
12	Fawziya Abdoulkarim	1 March 1989	1.80 m (5 ft 11 in)	67 kg (148 lb)	292 cm (115 in)	275 cm (108 in)	(France) Sens Olympique Club Volley Ball
14	Yolande Amana Guigolo	15 September 1997	1.84 m (6 ft 0 in)	78 kg (172 lb)	292 cm (115 in)	275 cm (108 in)	(Cameroon) Bafia VB Evolution
15	Emelda Piata Zessi	8 April 1997	1.90 m (6 ft 3 in)	65 kg (143 lb)	295 cm (116 in)	281 cm (111 in)	(Cameroon) Bafia VB Evolution
16	Estelle Adiana	14 May 1997	1.82 m (6 ft 0 in)	85 kg (187 lb)	285 cm (112 in)	256 cm (101 in)	(Cameroon) Nyong et Kelle VB
19	Reine Ngameni Mbopda Davina	14 November 2002	1.68 m (5 ft 6 in)	65 kg (143 lb)	250 cm (98 in)	240 cm (94 in)	(Cameroon) Bafia VB Evolution
20	Ruth Manuela Marie Bibinbe	23 April 2002	1.88 m (6 ft 2 in)	81 kg (179 lb)	296 cm (117 in)	278 cm (109 in)	(Cameroon) Bafia VB Evolution

=== Germany ===
The following is the German roster in the 2018 World Championship.

Head coach: Felix Koslowski

No.	Name	Date of birth	Height	Weight	Spike	Block	2017–18 club
1	Lenka Dürr	10 December 1990	1.71 m (5 ft 7 in)	59 kg (130 lb)	280 cm (110 in)	270 cm (110 in)	(Romania) Târgoviște
2	Pia Kästner	29 June 1998	1.82 m (6 ft 0 in)	68 kg (150 lb)	297 cm (117 in)	286 cm (113 in)	(Germany) Stuttgart
3	Denise Hanke	31 August 1989	1.80 m (5 ft 11 in)	58 kg (128 lb)	284 cm (112 in)	272 cm (107 in)	(Germany) Schweriner
4	Maren Brinker (c)	10 July 1986	1.84 m (6 ft 0 in)	68 kg (150 lb)	303 cm (119 in)	295 cm (116 in)	(Turkey) Çanakkale
5	Jana Franziska Poll	7 May 1988	1.85 m (6 ft 1 in)	69 kg (152 lb)	310 cm (120 in)	290 cm (110 in)	(Greece) Olympiacos
6	Jennifer Geerties	5 April 1994	1.84 m (6 ft 0 in)	58 kg (128 lb)	298 cm (117 in)	288 cm (113 in)	(Germany) Schweriner
8	Kimberly Drewniok	11 August 1997	1.88 m (6 ft 2 in)	73 kg (161 lb)	311 cm (122 in)	298 cm (117 in)	(Germany) Wiesbaden
10	Lena Stigrot	20 December 1994	1.84 m (6 ft 0 in)	68 kg (150 lb)	303 cm (119 in)	295 cm (116 in)	(Germany) Vilsbiburg
11	Louisa Lippmann	23 September 1994	1.91 m (6 ft 3 in)	78 kg (172 lb)	319 cm (126 in)	312 cm (123 in)	(Germany) Schweriner
14	Marie Schölzel	1 August 1997	1.88 m (6 ft 2 in)	66 kg (146 lb)	307 cm (121 in)	299 cm (118 in)	(Germany) Schweriner
15	Barbara Roxana Wezorke	12 April 1993	1.85 m (6 ft 1 in)	75 kg (165 lb)	305 cm (120 in)	290 cm (110 in)	(Germany) Vilsbiburg
17	Anna Pogany	21 July 1994	1.70 m (5 ft 7 in)	60 kg (130 lb)	280 cm (110 in)	270 cm (110 in)	(Switzerland) Aesch Pfeffingen
21	Ivana Vanjak	30 May 1995	1.90 m (6 ft 3 in)	70 kg (150 lb)	315 cm (124 in)	306 cm (120 in)	(Germany) Münster
22	Lisa Gründing	2 December 1991	1.86 m (6 ft 1 in)	68 kg (150 lb)	303 cm (119 in)	291 cm (115 in)	(Germany) Potsdam

=== Japan ===
The following is the Japanese roster in the 2018 World Championship.

Head coach: Kumi Nakada

No.	Name	Date of birth	Height	Weight	Spike	Block	2017–18 club
1	Miyu Nagaoka	25 July 1991	1.81 m (5 ft 11 in)	64 kg (141 lb)	308 cm (121 in)	303 cm (119 in)	(Japan) Hisamitsu Springs
2	Sarina Koga	21 May 1996	1.82 m (6 ft 0 in)	67 kg (148 lb)	302 cm (119 in)	290 cm (110 in)	(Japan) Red Rockets
3	Nana Iwasaka (c)	3 July 1990	1.87 m (6 ft 2 in)	75 kg (165 lb)	300 cm (120 in)	293 cm (115 in)	(Japan) Hisamitsu Springs
4	Risa Shinnabe	11 July 1990	1.73 m (5 ft 8 in)	64 kg (141 lb)	292 cm (115 in)	285 cm (112 in)	(Japan) Hisamitsu Springs
5	Erika Araki	3 August 1984	1.86 m (6 ft 1 in)	81 kg (179 lb)	305 cm (120 in)	297 cm (117 in)	(Japan) Toyota Auto Body Queenseis
7	Yuki Ishii	8 May 1991	1.82 m (6 ft 0 in)	68 kg (150 lb)	302 cm (119 in)	287 cm (113 in)	(Japan) Hisamitsu Springs
8	Mami Uchiseto	25 October 1991	1.70 m (5 ft 7 in)	74 kg (163 lb)	293 cm (115 in)	285 cm (112 in)	(Italy) Olbia
9	Haruyo Shimamura	4 March 1992	1.85 m (6 ft 1 in)	78 kg (172 lb)	298 cm (117 in)	280 cm (110 in)	(Japan) Red Rockets
10	Koyomi Tominaga	1 May 1989	1.75 m (5 ft 9 in)	68 kg (150 lb)	297 cm (117 in)	280 cm (110 in)	(Japan) Ageo Medics
13	Mai Okumura	31 October 1990	1.78 m (5 ft 10 in)	69 kg (152 lb)	297 cm (117 in)	285 cm (112 in)	(Japan) JT Marvelous
15	Kotoe Inoue	15 February 1990	1.62 m (5 ft 4 in)	55 kg (121 lb)	288 cm (113 in)	275 cm (108 in)	(Japan) JT Marvelous
16	Mako Kobata	15 August 1992	1.64 m (5 ft 5 in)	56 kg (123 lb)	281 cm (111 in)	274 cm (108 in)	(Japan) JT Marvelous
21	Ai Kurogo	14 June 1998	1.84 m (6 ft 0 in)	69 kg (152 lb)	306 cm (120 in)	295 cm (116 in)	(Japan) Toray Arrows
22	Kanami Tashiro	25 March 1991	1.73 m (5 ft 8 in)	66 kg (146 lb)	283 cm (111 in)	273 cm (107 in)	(Japan) Toray Arrows

=== Mexico ===
The following is the Mexican roster in the 2018 World Championship.

Head coach: (Cuba) Ricardo Naranjo

No.	Name	Date of birth	Height	Weight	Spike	Block	2017–18 club
1	Uxue Amaya Guereca Parra	12 February 2001	1.76 m (5 ft 9 in)	64 kg (141 lb)	270 cm (110 in)	259 cm (102 in)	(Mexico) Jalisco
2	Lizeth López	14 May 1990	1.64 m (5 ft 5 in)	65 kg (143 lb)	275 cm (108 in)	245 cm (96 in)	(Mexico) Nuevo León
3	Sanay Sashiko	13 May 1995	1.70 m (5 ft 7 in)	63 kg (139 lb)	305 cm (120 in)	298 cm (117 in)	(Mexico) Baja California
4	Ana Nieto	18 January 1994	1.82 m (6 ft 0 in)	61 kg (134 lb)	298 cm (117 in)	291 cm (115 in)	(Mexico) Jalisco
5	Andrea Rangel (c)	19 May 1993	1.80 m (5 ft 11 in)	57 kg (126 lb)	297 cm (117 in)	289 cm (114 in)	(Mexico) Nuevo León
6	Samantha Bricio	22 November 1994	1.85 m (6 ft 1 in)	58 kg (128 lb)	302 cm (119 in)	283 cm (111 in)	(Italy) Imoco Conegliano
8	Dulce Carranza	29 June 1990	1.78 m (5 ft 10 in)	83 kg (183 lb)	275 cm (108 in)	252 cm (99 in)	(Mexico) Nuevo León
9	Diana Valdez	11 January 1997	1.74 m (5 ft 9 in)	64 kg (141 lb)	290 cm (110 in)	276 cm (109 in)	(Mexico) Sinaloa
12	Joseline Landeros Palacios	20 December 2000	1.69 m (5 ft 7 in)	60 kg (130 lb)	265 cm (104 in)	249 cm (98 in)	(Mexico) Nuevo León
13	Mónica Moreno	27 April 1995	1.85 m (6 ft 1 in)	83 kg (183 lb)	292 cm (115 in)	289 cm (114 in)	(Mexico) Nuevo León
14	Grecia Esther Castro López	5 March 2001	1.80 m (5 ft 11 in)	75 kg (165 lb)	255 cm (100 in)	241 cm (95 in)	(Mexico) Baja California
15	Ana Valle	31 May 1996	1.94 m (6 ft 4 in)	89 kg (196 lb)	310 cm (120 in)	297 cm (117 in)	(Mexico) Distrito Federal
16	Melanie Guadalupe Parra Quintero	12 September 2002	1.76 m (5 ft 9 in)	50 kg (110 lb)	249 cm (98 in)	242 cm (95 in)	(Mexico) Sinaloa
22	Valeria Salinas González	2 June 2000	1.75 m (5 ft 9 in)	70 kg (150 lb)	265 cm (104 in)	252 cm (99 in)	(Mexico) Nuevo León

=== Netherlands ===
The following is the Dutch roster in the 2018 World Championship.

Head coach: Jamie Morrison

No.	Name	Date of birth	Height	Weight	Spike	Block	2017–18 club
1	Kirsten Knip	14 September 1992	1.79 m (5 ft 10 in)	70 kg (150 lb)	281 cm (111 in)	275 cm (108 in)	(Germany) Ladies in Black
3	Yvon Beliën	28 December 1993	1.88 m (6 ft 2 in)	73 kg (161 lb)	307 cm (121 in)	303 cm (119 in)	(Turkey) Bursa
4	Celeste Plak	26 October 1995	1.90 m (6 ft 3 in)	87 kg (192 lb)	314 cm (124 in)	302 cm (119 in)	(Italy) Novara
6	Maret Balkestein-Grothues (c)	16 September 1988	1.80 m (5 ft 11 in)	68 kg (150 lb)	304 cm (120 in)	285 cm (112 in)	(Italy) Casalmaggiore
7	Juliet Lohuis	10 September 1996	1.90 m (6 ft 3 in)	77 kg (170 lb)	305 cm (120 in)	295 cm (116 in)	(Germany) Münster
9	Myrthe Schoot	29 August 1988	1.84 m (6 ft 0 in)	70 kg (150 lb)	298 cm (117 in)	286 cm (113 in)	(Germany) Dresdner
10	Lonneke Slöetjes	15 November 1990	1.92 m (6 ft 4 in)	76 kg (168 lb)	322 cm (127 in)	315 cm (124 in)	(Turkey) Vakıfbank Istanbul
11	Anne Buijs	2 December 1991	1.91 m (6 ft 3 in)	73 kg (161 lb)	317 cm (125 in)	299 cm (118 in)	(Turkey) Nilüfer
12	Britt Bongaerts	3 November 1996	1.85 m (6 ft 1 in)	68 kg (150 lb)	296 cm (117 in)	284 cm (112 in)	(Germany) Ladies in Black
14	Laura Dijkema	18 February 1990	1.84 m (6 ft 0 in)	70 kg (150 lb)	293 cm (115 in)	279 cm (110 in)	(Italy) Firenze
17	Nicole Oude Luttikhuis	26 December 1997	1.91 m (6 ft 3 in)	82 kg (181 lb)	312 cm (123 in)	305 cm (120 in)	(Germany) Ladies in Black
18	Marrit Jasper	28 February 1996	1.80 m (5 ft 11 in)	75 kg (165 lb)	300 cm (120 in)	285 cm (112 in)	(Germany) Dresdner
20	Tessa Polder	10 October 1997	1.89 m (6 ft 2 in)	76 kg (168 lb)	301 cm (119 in)	293 cm (115 in)	(Germany) Ladies in Black
22	Nicole Koolhaas	31 January 1991	1.98 m (6 ft 6 in)	77 kg (170 lb)	310 cm (120 in)	300 cm (120 in)	(Romania) București

== Pool B ==
=== Bulgaria ===
The following is the Bulgarian roster in the 2018 World Championship.

Head coach: Ivan Petkov

No.	Name	Date of birth	Height	Weight	Spike	Block	2017–18 club
1	Gergana Dimitrova	28 February 1996	1.84 m (6 ft 0 in)	71 kg (157 lb)	305 cm (120 in)	288 cm (113 in)	(France) RC Cannes
2	Nasya Dimitrova	6 November 1992	1.90 m (6 ft 3 in)	70 kg (150 lb)	305 cm (120 in)	290 cm (110 in)	(Bulgaria) Maritza Plovdiv VC
3	Kristiana Petrova	13 July 1997	1.77 m (5 ft 10 in)	70 kg (150 lb)	290 cm (110 in)	282 cm (111 in)	(Bulgaria) Levski Volley
4	Veselina Grigorova	6 September 1995	1.94 m (6 ft 4 in)	80 kg (180 lb)	303 cm (119 in)	292 cm (115 in)	(Bulgaria) Kazanlak Volley
6	Miroslava Paskova	16 February 1996	1.80 m (5 ft 11 in)	67 kg (148 lb)	299 cm (118 in)	280 cm (110 in)	(Bulgaria) Levski Volley
7	Lora Kitipova	19 May 1991	1.84 m (6 ft 0 in)	66 kg (146 lb)	290 cm (110 in)	283 cm (111 in)	(Bulgaria) Maritza Plovdiv VC
8	Petya Barakova	18 June 1994	1.80 m (5 ft 11 in)	76 kg (168 lb)	283 cm (111 in)	271 cm (107 in)	(Romania) Alba Blaj
9	Monika Krasteva	9 May 1999	1.83 m (6 ft 0 in)	64 kg (141 lb)	292 cm (115 in)	285 cm (112 in)	(Bulgaria) Levski Volley
10	Mira Todorova	12 April 1994	1.87 m (6 ft 2 in)	70 kg (150 lb)	312 cm (123 in)	300 cm (120 in)	(France) Le Cannet
11	Hristina Ruseva (c)	1 October 1991	1.90 m (6 ft 3 in)	77 kg (170 lb)	305 cm (120 in)	290 cm (110 in)	(Turkey) Galatasaray S.K
12	Mariya Karakasheva	27 October 1988	1.82 m (6 ft 0 in)	68 kg (150 lb)	295 cm (116 in)	290 cm (110 in)	(Bulgaria) VC CSKA Sofia
13	Ivelina Monova	17 January 1986	1.73 m (5 ft 8 in)	58 kg (128 lb)	285 cm (112 in)	280 cm (110 in)	(Bulgaria) Maritza Plovdiv VC
15	Zhana Todorova	6 January 1997	1.70 m (5 ft 7 in)	56 kg (123 lb)	271 cm (107 in)	255 cm (100 in)	(Bulgaria) Maritza Plovdiv VC
18	Silvana Chausheva	19 May 1995	1.88 m (6 ft 2 in)	75 kg (165 lb)	305 cm (120 in)	290 cm (110 in)	(Bulgaria) Maritza Plovdiv VC

=== Canada ===
The following is the Canadian roster in the 2018 World Championship.

Head coach: Marcello Abbondanza

No.	Name	Date of birth	Height	Weight	Spike	Block	2017–18 club
1	Jessica Niles	14 July 1993	1.76 m (5 ft 9 in)	61 kg (134 lb)	287 cm (113 in)	278 cm (109 in)	(Austria) ATSC Kelag Wildcats
2	Autumn Bailey	2 June 1995	1.78 m (5 ft 10 in)	80 kg (180 lb)	300 cm (120 in)	280 cm (110 in)	(United States) Michigan State
4	Kyla Richey (c)	20 June 1989	1.88 m (6 ft 2 in)	83 kg (183 lb)	309 cm (122 in)	292 cm (115 in)	(Indonesia) Jakarta Pertamina Energi
5	Danielle Smith	29 April 1990	1.78 m (5 ft 10 in)	68 kg (150 lb)	291 cm (115 in)	277 cm (109 in)	(Romania) CSM Târgoviște
7	Brianna Beamish	4 September 1993	1.79 m (5 ft 10 in)	69 kg (152 lb)	300 cm (120 in)	286 cm (113 in)	(France) RC Cannes
8	Alicia Ogoms	2 April 1994	1.94 m (6 ft 4 in)	82 kg (181 lb)	315 cm (124 in)	305 cm (120 in)	(Italy) SAB Volley
9	Alexa Lea Gray	7 August 1994	1.85 m (6 ft 1 in)	75 kg (165 lb)	323 cm (127 in)	215 cm (85 in)	(Italy) Volley Soverato
11	Anna Feore	23 November 1996	1.75 m (5 ft 9 in)	63 kg (139 lb)	299 cm (118 in)	290 cm (110 in)	(Canada) University of Toronto
12	Jennifer Cross	4 July 1992	1.95 m (6 ft 5 in)	81 kg (179 lb)	315 cm (124 in)	296 cm (117 in)	(Hungary) UTE Profisport Szolgaltato
16	Shainah Joseph	15 May 1995	1.83 m (6 ft 0 in)	79 kg (174 lb)	328 cm (129 in)	318 cm (125 in)	(Bulgaria) Maritza Plovdiv VC
19	Marie-Alex Bélanger	13 April 1993	1.86 m (6 ft 1 in)	75 kg (165 lb)	315 cm (124 in)	295 cm (116 in)	(Canada) Université de Montréal
22	Megan Cyr	1 June 1990	1.82 m (6 ft 0 in)	75 kg (165 lb)	297 cm (117 in)	282 cm (111 in)	(Italy) VBC Pallavolo Rossa ssdrl
23	Emily Maglio	1 June 1996	1.89 m (6 ft 2 in)	82 kg (181 lb)	318 cm (125 in)	302 cm (119 in)	(United States) University of Hawaii
25	Kiera Van Ryk	6 January 1999	1.85 m (6 ft 1 in)	85 kg (187 lb)	302 cm (119 in)	288 cm (113 in)	(Canada) University of British Columbia

=== China ===
The following is the Chinese roster in the 2018 World Championship.

Head coach: Lang Ping

No.	Name	Date of birth	Height	Weight	Spike	Block	2017–18 club
1	Yuan Xinyue	21 December 1996	2.01 m (6 ft 7 in)	78 kg (172 lb)	317 cm (125 in)	311 cm (122 in)	(China) Army
2	Zhu Ting (c)	29 November 1994	1.98 m (6 ft 6 in)	78 kg (172 lb)	327 cm (129 in)	300 cm (120 in)	(Turkey) Vakıfbank Istanbul
4	Yang Hanyu	12 October 1999	1.97 m (6 ft 6 in)	72 kg (159 lb)	317 cm (125 in)	311 cm (122 in)	(China) Shandong
5	Hu Mingyuan	17 May 1996	1.87 m (6 ft 2 in)	69 kg (152 lb)	305 cm (120 in)	297 cm (117 in)	(China) Liaoning
6	Gong Xiangyu	21 April 1997	1.88 m (6 ft 2 in)	72 kg (159 lb)	313 cm (123 in)	302 cm (119 in)	(China) Jiangsu
8	Zeng Chunlei	3 November 1989	1.87 m (6 ft 2 in)	67 kg (148 lb)	315 cm (124 in)	315 cm (124 in)	(China) Beijing
9	Zhang Changning	6 November 1995	1.93 m (6 ft 4 in)	80 kg (180 lb)	315 cm (124 in)	303 cm (119 in)	(China) Jiangsu
10	Liu Xiaotong	16 February 1990	1.88 m (6 ft 2 in)	80 kg (180 lb)	312 cm (123 in)	300 cm (120 in)	(China) Beijing
11	Yao Di	15 August 1992	1.82 m (6 ft 0 in)	65 kg (143 lb)	306 cm (120 in)	298 cm (117 in)	(China) Tianjin
12	Li Yingying	19 February 2000	1.96 m (6 ft 5 in)	71 kg (157 lb)	302 cm (119 in)	294 cm (116 in)	(China) Tianjin
15	Lin Li	15 July 1992	1.71 m (5 ft 7 in)	65 kg (143 lb)	294 cm (116 in)	294 cm (116 in)	(China) Fujian
16	Ding Xia	13 January 1990	1.80 m (5 ft 11 in)	67 kg (148 lb)	305 cm (120 in)	300 cm (120 in)	(China) Liaoning
17	Yan Ni	2 March 1987	1.92 m (6 ft 4 in)	74 kg (163 lb)	317 cm (125 in)	306 cm (120 in)	(China) Liaoning
18	Wang Mengjie	14 November 1995	1.72 m (5 ft 8 in)	65 kg (143 lb)	289 cm (114 in)	280 cm (110 in)	(China) Shandong

=== Cuba ===
The following is the Cuban roster in the 2018 World Championship.

Head coach: Tomás Fernández

No.	Name	Date of birth	Height	Weight	Spike	Block	2017–18 club
1	Claudia Hernández	9 January 1997	1.81 m (5 ft 11 in)	78 kg (172 lb)	225 cm (89 in)	223 cm (88 in)	(Cuba) La Habana
4	Lianny Tamayo	30 April 1999	1.78 m (5 ft 10 in)	58 kg (128 lb)	295 cm (116 in)	290 cm (110 in)	(Cuba) Las Tunas
7	Evilania Martínez	11 January 2000	1.84 m (6 ft 0 in)	71 kg (157 lb)	305 cm (120 in)	300 cm (120 in)	(Cuba) Camagüey
8	Diaris Pérez (c)	16 November 1998	1.82 m (6 ft 0 in)	75 kg (165 lb)	304 cm (120 in)	295 cm (116 in)	(Cuba) La Habana
11	Gretell Moreno	30 January 1998	1.83 m (6 ft 0 in)	68 kg (150 lb)	287 cm (113 in)	280 cm (110 in)	(Cuba) Granma
12	Ailama Cesé	29 October 2000	1.88 m (6 ft 2 in)	58 kg (128 lb)	322 cm (127 in)	308 cm (121 in)	(Cuba) Mayabeque
14	Jessica Aguilera	25 May 1999	1.84 m (6 ft 0 in)	68 kg (150 lb)	311 cm (122 in)	302 cm (119 in)	(Cuba) La Habana
17	Kitania Medina	24 February 1999	1.86 m (6 ft 1 in)	77 kg (170 lb)	308 cm (121 in)	295 cm (116 in)	(Cuba) La Habana
19	Laura Suárez	13 December 1998	1.85 m (6 ft 1 in)	75 kg (165 lb)	304 cm (120 in)	292 cm (115 in)	(Cuba) Pinar Del Río
22	Egli Sabin	25 November 1991	1.87 m (6 ft 2 in)	76 kg (168 lb)	315 cm (124 in)	308 cm (121 in)	(Cuba) Cienfuegos
23	Daima del Río	9 September 2000	1.80 m (5 ft 11 in)	77 kg (170 lb)	236 cm (93 in)	234 cm (92 in)	(Cuba) La Habana
25	Ivy May Vila	22 July 2001	1.81 m (5 ft 11 in)	78 kg (172 lb)	235 cm (93 in)	232 cm (91 in)	(Cuba) Camagüey

=== Italy ===
The following is the Italian roster in the 2018 World Championship.

Head coach: Davide Mazzanti

No.	Name	Date of birth	Height	Weight	Spike	Block	2017–18 club
1	Serena Ortolani	7 January 1987	1.87 m (6 ft 2 in)	63 kg (139 lb)	320 cm (130 in)	240 cm (94 in)	(Italy) Monza
3	Carlotta Cambi	28 May 1996	1.77 m (5 ft 10 in)	66 kg (146 lb)	302 cm (119 in)	292 cm (115 in)	(Italy) Pesaro
5	Ofelia Malinov	29 February 1996	1.85 m (6 ft 1 in)	70 kg (150 lb)	304 cm (120 in)	285 cm (112 in)	(Italy) Bergamo
6	Monica De Gennaro	8 January 1987	1.74 m (5 ft 9 in)	67 kg (148 lb)	292 cm (115 in)	217 cm (85 in)	(Italy) Conegliano
7	Sylvia Nwakalor	12 August 1999	1.77 m (5 ft 10 in)	71 kg (157 lb)	318 cm (125 in)	290 cm (110 in)	(Italy) Club Italia
10	Cristina Chirichella (c)	10 February 1994	1.95 m (6 ft 5 in)	79 kg (174 lb)	322 cm (127 in)	306 cm (120 in)	(Italy) Novara
11	Anna Danesi	20 April 1996	1.98 m (6 ft 6 in)	78 kg (172 lb)	312 cm (123 in)	294 cm (116 in)	(Italy) Conegliano
13	Sarah Fahr	12 September 2001	1.94 m (6 ft 4 in)	84 kg (185 lb)	322 cm (127 in)	206 cm (81 in)	(Italy) Club Italia
14	Elena Pietrini	17 March 2000	1.90 m (6 ft 3 in)	73 kg (161 lb)	330 cm (130 in)	206 cm (81 in)	(Italy) Club Italia
15	Marina Lubian	11 April 2000	1.95 m (6 ft 5 in)	73 kg (161 lb)	318 cm (125 in)	300 cm (120 in)	(Italy) Club Italia
16	Lucia Bosetti	9 July 1989	1.78 m (5 ft 10 in)	63 kg (139 lb)	310 cm (120 in)	292 cm (115 in)	(Italy) Scandicci
17	Miriam Sylla	8 January 1995	1.87 m (6 ft 2 in)	80 kg (180 lb)	320 cm (130 in)	240 cm (94 in)	(Italy) Bergamo
18	Paola Egonu	18 December 1998	1.93 m (6 ft 4 in)	80 kg (180 lb)	344 cm (135 in)	321 cm (126 in)	(Italy) Novara
20	Beatrice Parrocchiale	26 December 1995	1.68 m (5 ft 6 in)	59 kg (130 lb)	286 cm (113 in)	258 cm (102 in)	(Italy) Firenze

=== Turkey ===
The following is the Turkish roster in the 2018 World Championship.

Head coach: Giovanni Guidetti

No.	Name	Date of birth	Height	Weight	Spike	Block	2017–18 club
1	Hatice Gizem Örge	26 April 1993	1.72 m (5 ft 8 in)	59 kg (130 lb)	270 cm (110 in)	260 cm (100 in)	(Turkey) Vakıfbank Istanbul
2	Simge Şebnem Aköz	23 April 1991	1.68 m (5 ft 6 in)	55 kg (121 lb)	250 cm (98 in)	245 cm (96 in)	(Turkey) Eczacıbaşı VitrA
3	Cansu Özbay	17 October 1996	1.82 m (6 ft 0 in)	75 kg (165 lb)	285 cm (112 in)	284 cm (112 in)	(Turkey) Vakıfbank Istanbul
4	Beyza Arıcı	27 July 1995	1.93 m (6 ft 4 in)	82 kg (181 lb)	302 cm (119 in)	293 cm (115 in)	(Turkey) Eczacıbaşı VitrA
5	Şeyma Ercan	5 July 1994	1.87 m (6 ft 2 in)	75 kg (165 lb)	302 cm (119 in)	295 cm (116 in)	(Turkey) Beşiktaş
7	Hande Baladın	1 September 1997	1.89 m (6 ft 2 in)	71 kg (157 lb)	310 cm (120 in)	300 cm (120 in)	(Turkey) Eczacıbaşı VitrA
9	Meliha İsmailoğlu	17 September 1993	1.88 m (6 ft 2 in)	70 kg (150 lb)	310 cm (120 in)	301 cm (119 in)	(Turkey) Eczacıbaşı VitrA
10	Çağla Akın	19 January 1995	1.78 m (5 ft 10 in)	70 kg (150 lb)	300 cm (120 in)	280 cm (110 in)	(Turkey) Vakıfbank Istanbul
13	Meryem Çalık	3 February 1988	1.95 m (6 ft 5 in)	63 kg (139 lb)	315 cm (124 in)	310 cm (120 in)	(Turkey) Seramiksan
14	Eda Erdem Dündar (c)	22 June 1987	1.88 m (6 ft 2 in)	73 kg (161 lb)	311 cm (122 in)	305 cm (120 in)	(Turkey) Fenerbahçe
15	Ebrar Karakurt	17 January 2000	1.96 m (6 ft 5 in)	72 kg (159 lb)	307 cm (121 in)	305 cm (120 in)	(Turkey) Vakıfbank Istanbul
18	Zehra Güneş	7 July 1999	1.97 m (6 ft 6 in)	82 kg (181 lb)	309 cm (122 in)	255 cm (100 in)	(Turkey) Vakıfbank Istanbul
20	Aylin Sarıoğlu	21 July 1995	1.68 m (5 ft 6 in)	67 kg (148 lb)	300 cm (120 in)	290 cm (110 in)	(Turkey) Bursa
23	Derya Cebecioğlu	24 October 2000	1.85 m (6 ft 1 in)	65 kg (143 lb)	290 cm (110 in)	280 cm (110 in)	(Turkey) Vakıfbank Istanbul

== Pool C ==
=== Azerbaijan ===
The following is the Azerbaijani roster in the 2018 World Championship.

Head coach: Faig Garayev

No.	Name	Date of birth	Height	Weight	Spike	Block	2017–18 club
2	Yana Azimova	5 July 1994	1.76 m (5 ft 9 in)	65 kg (143 lb)	290 cm (110 in)	285 cm (112 in)	(Azerbaijan) Absheron
3	Anastasiya Gurbanova	4 December 1989	1.90 m (6 ft 3 in)	73 kg (161 lb)	305 cm (120 in)	290 cm (110 in)	(France) Pays d'Aix Venelles
5	Odina Aliyeva (c)	22 May 1990	1.86 m (6 ft 1 in)	82 kg (181 lb)	315 cm (124 in)	295 cm (116 in)	(Turkey) Seramiksan SK
6	Ayshan Abdulazimova	11 April 1993	1.77 m (5 ft 10 in)	68 kg (150 lb)	265 cm (104 in)	260 cm (100 in)	(Azerbaijan) Azerrail Baku
7	Olena Hasanova	25 November 1995	1.87 m (6 ft 2 in)	72 kg (159 lb)	305 cm (120 in)	300 cm (120 in)	(France) Le Cannet
8	Yelyzaveta Samadova	3 March 1995	1.85 m (6 ft 1 in)	72 kg (159 lb)	305 cm (120 in)	290 cm (110 in)	(Italy) Savino Del Bene Scandicci
9	Natalya Mammadova	2 December 1984	1.96 m (6 ft 5 in)	78 kg (172 lb)	319 cm (126 in)	302 cm (119 in)	(Russia) Dinamo Kazan
10	Jana Kulan	7 July 1987	1.98 m (6 ft 6 in)	76 kg (168 lb)	318 cm (125 in)	302 cm (119 in)	(Turkey) Beylikdüzü Istanbul
14	Krystsina Yagubova	13 February 1996	1.84 m (6 ft 0 in)	69 kg (152 lb)	295 cm (116 in)	285 cm (112 in)	(Azerbaijan) Azerrail Baku
15	Aynur Imanova	7 December 1988	1.89 m (6 ft 2 in)	66 kg (146 lb)	290 cm (110 in)	280 cm (110 in)	(Azerbaijan) Azerrail Baku
16	Iuliia Karimova	7 February 1988	1.76 m (5 ft 9 in)	56 kg (123 lb)	260 cm (100 in)	255 cm (100 in)	
17	Polina Rahimova	5 June 1990	1.98 m (6 ft 6 in)	73 kg (161 lb)	307 cm (121 in)	290 cm (110 in)	(Turkey) Fenerbahçe Istanbul
18	Shafagat Alishanova	3 August 1991	1.78 m (5 ft 10 in)	63 kg (139 lb)	287 cm (113 in)	280 cm (110 in)	(Azerbaijan) Azerrail Baku
19	Bayaz Aliyeva	9 June 1990	1.76 m (5 ft 9 in)	65 kg (143 lb)	290 cm (110 in)	285 cm (112 in)	

=== Russia ===
The following is the Russian roster in the 2018 World Championship.

Head coach: Vadim Pankov

No.	Name	Date of birth	Height	Weight	Spike	Block	2017–18 club
2	Daria Talysheva	16 October 1991	1.82 m (6 ft 0 in)	67 kg (148 lb)	295 cm (116 in)	288 cm (113 in)	(Russia) Dinamo Moscow
3	Ekaterina Efimova	3 July 1993	1.92 m (6 ft 4 in)	70 kg (150 lb)	305 cm (120 in)	295 cm (116 in)	(Russia) Yenisey Krasnoyarsk
6	Irina Zaryazhko	4 October 1991	1.96 m (6 ft 5 in)	78 kg (172 lb)	305 cm (120 in)	290 cm (110 in)	(Russia) Dinamo Kazan
7	Tatiana Romanova	9 September 1994	1.78 m (5 ft 10 in)	64 kg (141 lb)	292 cm (115 in)	285 cm (112 in)	(Russia) Uralochka Yekaterinburg
8	Nataliya Goncharova	1 June 1989	1.96 m (6 ft 5 in)	75 kg (165 lb)	315 cm (124 in)	306 cm (120 in)	(Russia) Dinamo Moscow
9	Alla Galkina	15 April 1992	1.78 m (5 ft 10 in)	65 kg (143 lb)	295 cm (116 in)	290 cm (110 in)	(Russia) Proton Balakovo
11	Ekaterina Lyubushkina	2 January 1990	1.88 m (6 ft 2 in)	81 kg (179 lb)	300 cm (120 in)	285 cm (112 in)	(Russia) Dinamo Moscow
13	Yevgeniya Startseva (c)	12 February 1989	1.85 m (6 ft 1 in)	68 kg (150 lb)	294 cm (116 in)	290 cm (110 in)	(Russia) Dinamo Kazan
14	Irina Fetisova	7 September 1994	1.90 m (6 ft 3 in)	76 kg (168 lb)	307 cm (121 in)	286 cm (113 in)	(Russia) Dinamo Moscow
16	Irina Voronkova	20 October 1995	1.90 m (6 ft 3 in)	84 kg (185 lb)	305 cm (120 in)	290 cm (110 in)	(Russia) Dinamo Kazan
18	Ksenia Parubets	31 October 1994	1.83 m (6 ft 0 in)	64 kg (141 lb)	300 cm (120 in)	286 cm (113 in)	(Russia) Leningradka Saint Petersburg
19	Olga Biryukova	19 September 1994	1.93 m (6 ft 4 in)	74 kg (163 lb)	300 cm (120 in)	283 cm (111 in)	(Turkey) Beşiktaş
20	Daria Malygina	4 April 1994	2.02 m (6 ft 8 in)	82 kg (181 lb)	317 cm (125 in)	305 cm (120 in)	(Russia) Dinamo Kazan
21	Anna Kotikova	13 October 1999	1.85 m (6 ft 1 in)	71 kg (157 lb)	306 cm (120 in)	300 cm (120 in)	(Russia) Dinamo Kazan

=== South Korea ===
The following is the South Korean roster in the 2018 World Championship.

Head coach: Cha Hae-won

No.	Name	Date of birth	Height	Weight	Spike	Block	2017–18 club
1	Park Eun-jin	15 December 1999	1.88 m (6 ft 2 in)	72 kg (159 lb)	295 cm (116 in)	280 cm (110 in)	(South Korea) Seonmyeong Girl's High School
2	Lee Ju-ah	21 August 2000	1.85 m (6 ft 1 in)	70 kg (150 lb)	280 cm (110 in)	280 cm (110 in)	(South Korea) Wongok High School
3	Jung Ho-young	23 August 2001	1.89 m (6 ft 2 in)	66 kg (146 lb)	285 cm (112 in)	260 cm (100 in)	(South Korea) Seonmyeong Girl's High School
5	Lee Hyo-hee	9 September 1980	1.73 m (5 ft 8 in)	58 kg (128 lb)	280 cm (110 in)	271 cm (107 in)	(South Korea) Gimcheon
6	Lee Na-yeon	25 March 1992	1.73 m (5 ft 8 in)	63 kg (139 lb)	270 cm (110 in)	260 cm (100 in)	(South Korea) Seoul
7	Kim Hae-ran	16 March 1984	1.68 m (5 ft 6 in)	60 kg (130 lb)	260 cm (100 in)	250 cm (98 in)	(South Korea) Incheon Pink Spiders
9	Oh Ji-young	11 July 1988	1.70 m (5 ft 7 in)	68 kg (150 lb)	275 cm (108 in)	266 cm (105 in)	(South Korea) Gimcheon
10	Kim Yeon-koung (c)	26 February 1988	1.92 m (6 ft 4 in)	73 kg (161 lb)	350 cm (140 in)	340 cm (130 in)	(China) Shanghai
11	Kim Su-ji	11 July 1987	1.87 m (6 ft 2 in)	68 kg (150 lb)	335 cm (132 in)	320 cm (130 in)	(South Korea) Hwaseong
12	Lee So-young	17 October 1994	1.76 m (5 ft 9 in)	66 kg (146 lb)	280 cm (110 in)	265 cm (104 in)	(South Korea) Seoul
13	Park Jeong-ah	26 March 1993	1.87 m (6 ft 2 in)	75 kg (165 lb)	300 cm (120 in)	290 cm (110 in)	(South Korea) Gimcheon
14	Yang Hyo-jin	14 December 1989	1.90 m (6 ft 3 in)	72 kg (159 lb)	340 cm (130 in)	332 cm (131 in)	(South Korea) Suwon
17	Lee Jae-yeong	15 October 1996	1.79 m (5 ft 10 in)	64 kg (141 lb)	286 cm (113 in)	267 cm (105 in)	(South Korea) Incheon Pink Spiders
20	Na Hyun-jung	10 March 1990	1.63 m (5 ft 4 in)	54 kg (119 lb)	257 cm (101 in)	250 cm (98 in)	(South Korea) Seoul

=== Thailand ===
The following is the Thai roster in the 2018 World Championship.

Head coach: Danai Sriwatcharamethakul

No.	Name	Date of birth	Height	Weight	Spike	Block	2018–19 club
2	Piyanut Pannoy	10 November 1989	1.73 m (5 ft 8 in)	62 kg (137 lb)	280 cm (9 ft 2 in)	275 cm (9 ft 0 in)	(Thailand) Chonburi
3	Pornpun Guedpard	5 May 1993	1.74 m (5 ft 9 in)	66 kg (146 lb)	294 cm (9 ft 8 in)	290 cm (9 ft 6 in)	(Thailand) Quint Air Force
4	Thatdao Nuekjang	3 February 1994	1.85 m (6 ft 1 in)	72 kg (159 lb)	308 cm (10 ft 1 in)	296 cm (9 ft 9 in)	(Thailand) Khonkaen Star
5	Pleumjit Thinkaow (c)	9 November 1983	1.81 m (5 ft 11 in)	67 kg (148 lb)	303 cm (9 ft 11 in)	283 cm (9 ft 3 in)	(Thailand) Chonburi
6	Onuma Sittirak	13 June 1986	1.77 m (5 ft 10 in)	72 kg (159 lb)	304 cm (10 ft 0 in)	285 cm (9 ft 4 in)	(Thailand) Nakhon Ratchasima
8	Watchareeya Nuanjam	22 July 1996	1.78 m (5 ft 10 in)	64 kg (141 lb)	292 cm (9 ft 7 in)	279 cm (9 ft 2 in)	(Thailand) Chonburi
10	Wilavan Apinyapong	6 June 1984	1.74 m (5 ft 9 in)	70 kg (150 lb)	294 cm (9 ft 8 in)	282 cm (9 ft 3 in)	(Thailand) Chonburi
13	Nootsara Tomkom	7 July 1985	1.70 m (5 ft 7 in)	57 kg (126 lb)	289 cm (9 ft 6 in)	278 cm (9 ft 1 in)	(Thailand) Chonburi
14	Chitaporn Kamlangmak	17 March 1996	1.86 m (6 ft 1 in)	74 kg (163 lb)	290 cm (9 ft 6 in)	282 cm (9 ft 3 in)	(Thailand) Khonkaen Star
15	Malika Kanthong	8 January 1987	1.78 m (5 ft 10 in)	65 kg (143 lb)	292 cm (9 ft 7 in)	278 cm (9 ft 1 in)	(Thailand) Nakhon Ratchasima
16	Pimpichaya Kokram	16 June 1998	1.79 m (5 ft 10 in)	62 kg (137 lb)	293 cm (9 ft 7 in)	283 cm (9 ft 3 in)	(Thailand) Nonthaburi
18	Ajcharaporn Kongyot	18 June 1995	1.80 m (5 ft 11 in)	65 kg (143 lb)	298 cm (9 ft 9 in)	287 cm (9 ft 5 in)	(Indonesia) Jakarta Pertamina
19	Chatchu-on Moksri	6 November 1999	1.80 m (5 ft 11 in)	58 kg (128 lb)	298 cm (9 ft 9 in)	290 cm (9 ft 6 in)	(Japan) PFU BlueCats
20	Supattra Pairoj	27 June 1990	1.60 m (5 ft 3 in)	58 kg (128 lb)	275 cm (9 ft 0 in)	265 cm (8 ft 8 in)	(Thailand) Chonburi

=== Trinidad and Tobago ===
The following is the Trinidadian and Tobagonian roster in the 2018 World Championship.

Head coach: Francisco Cruz Jiménez

No.	Name	Date of birth	Height	Weight	Spike	Block	2017–18 club
2	Jalicia Ross	26 July 1984	1.85 m (6 ft 1 in)	72 kg (159 lb)	308 cm (121 in)	270 cm (110 in)	(Trinidad and Tobago) Glamorgan
3	Channon Thompson	29 March 1994	1.85 m (6 ft 1 in)	72 kg (159 lb)	315 cm (124 in)	303 cm (119 in)	(Turkey) Numune SK Ankara
4	Kelly-Anne Billingy	15 May 1986	1.90 m (6 ft 3 in)	87 kg (192 lb)	316 cm (124 in)	303 cm (119 in)	(Trinidad and Tobago) Technocrats
5	Delicia Pierre	11 October 1991	1.80 m (5 ft 11 in)	79 kg (174 lb)	301 cm (119 in)	285 cm (112 in)	(Trinidad and Tobago) West Side Stars
6	Sinead Jack	8 November 1993	1.98 m (6 ft 6 in)	82 kg (181 lb)	310 cm (120 in)	304 cm (120 in)	(Turkey) Galatasaray Istanbul
7	Kiune Fletcher	14 May 2002	1.81 m (5 ft 11 in)	64 kg (141 lb)	300 cm (120 in)	265 cm (104 in)	(Trinidad and Tobago) West Side Stars
8	Darlene Ramdin	5 August 1989	1.87 m (6 ft 2 in)	89 kg (196 lb)	286 cm (113 in)	281 cm (111 in)	(Philippines) Generika-Ayala Lifesavers
10	Taija Thomas	24 October 1996	1.83 m (6 ft 0 in)	66 kg (146 lb)	315 cm (124 in)	280 cm (110 in)	
11	Afesha Olton	22 May 1992	1.65 m (5 ft 5 in)	60 kg (130 lb)	200 cm (79 in)	185 cm (73 in)	(Trinidad and Tobago) UTT
12	Renele Forde (c)	6 August 1990	1.90 m (6 ft 3 in)	82 kg (181 lb)	304 cm (120 in)	295 cm (116 in)	(Sweden) Svedala Volley
15	Latisha Morain	28 June 1997	1.65 m (5 ft 5 in)	65 kg (143 lb)	185 cm (73 in)	175 cm (69 in)	(Trinidad and Tobago) UTT
16	Krystle Esdelle	1 August 1984	1.86 m (6 ft 1 in)	67 kg (148 lb)	329 cm (130 in)	299 cm (118 in)	(Turkey) Pursaklar Belediyesi

=== United States ===
The following is the American roster in the 2018 World Championship.

Head coach: Karch Kiraly

No.	Name	Date of birth	Height	Weight	Spike	Block	2017–18 club
1	Micha Hancock	10 November 1992	1.80 m (5 ft 11 in)	76 kg (168 lb)	305 cm (120 in)	297 cm (117 in)	(Italy) Monza
3	Carli Lloyd	6 August 1989	1.80 m (5 ft 11 in)	75 kg (165 lb)	313 cm (123 in)	295 cm (116 in)	(Brazil) Barueri
5	Rachael Adams	3 June 1990	1.88 m (6 ft 2 in)	81 kg (179 lb)	318 cm (125 in)	307 cm (121 in)	(Turkey) Eczacıbaşı VitrA
6	TeTori Dixon	4 August 1992	1.91 m (6 ft 3 in)	83 kg (183 lb)	306 cm (120 in)	295 cm (116 in)	(Italy) Monza
8	Lauren Gibbemeyer	8 September 1988	1.87 m (6 ft 2 in)	71 kg (157 lb)	307 cm (121 in)	293 cm (115 in)	(Italy) Novara
10	Jordan Larson (c)	16 October 1986	1.90 m (6 ft 3 in)	75 kg (165 lb)	302 cm (119 in)	295 cm (116 in)	(Turkey) Eczacıbaşı VitrA
12	Kelly Murphy	20 October 1989	1.88 m (6 ft 2 in)	79 kg (174 lb)	315 cm (124 in)	307 cm (121 in)	Free agent
13	Sarah Wilhite	30 July 1995	1.85 m (6 ft 1 in)	75 kg (165 lb)	305 cm (120 in)	300 cm (120 in)	(Italy) Busto Arsizio
14	Michelle Bartsch-Hackley	12 February 1990	1.90 m (6 ft 3 in)	78 kg (172 lb)	305 cm (120 in)	296 cm (117 in)	(Italy) Busto Arsizio
15	Kim Hill	30 November 1989	1.93 m (6 ft 4 in)	72 kg (159 lb)	320 cm (130 in)	310 cm (120 in)	(Italy) Conegliano
16	Foluke Akinradewo	5 October 1987	1.91 m (6 ft 3 in)	79 kg (174 lb)	331 cm (130 in)	300 cm (120 in)	(Japan) Hisamitsu Springs
17	Megan Courtney	27 October 1993	1.85 m (6 ft 1 in)	61 kg (134 lb)	315 cm (124 in)	300 cm (120 in)	(Poland) Impel Wrocław
23	Kelsey Robinson	25 June 1992	1.88 m (6 ft 2 in)	73 kg (161 lb)	307 cm (121 in)	298 cm (117 in)	(Turkey) Vakıfbank Istanbul
24	Karsta Lowe	2 February 1993	1.96 m (6 ft 5 in)	75 kg (165 lb)	315 cm (124 in)	305 cm (120 in)	Free agent

== Pool D ==
=== Brazil ===
The following is the Brazilian roster in the 2018 World Championship.

Head coach: José Roberto Guimarães

No.	Name	Date of birth	Height	Weight	Spike	Block	2017–18 club
1	Gabriella Souza	14 December 1993	1.75 m (5 ft 9 in)	69 kg (152 lb)	296 cm (117 in)	273 cm (107 in)	(Brazil) Rio de Janeiro
3	Danielle Lins	5 January 1985	1.83 m (6 ft 0 in)	68 kg (150 lb)	290 cm (110 in)	276 cm (109 in)	Free agent
4	Ana Carolina da Silva	8 April 1991	1.83 m (6 ft 0 in)	73 kg (161 lb)	290 cm (110 in)	290 cm (110 in)	(Turkey) Nilüfer
5	Adenízia da Silva	18 December 1986	1.85 m (6 ft 1 in)	63 kg (139 lb)	312 cm (123 in)	290 cm (110 in)	(Italy) Scandicci
6	Thaísa Menezes	15 May 1987	1.96 m (6 ft 5 in)	79 kg (174 lb)	316 cm (124 in)	301 cm (119 in)	(Brazil) Barueri
7	Rosamaria Montibeller	9 April 1994	1.85 m (6 ft 1 in)	76 kg (168 lb)	291 cm (115 in)	285 cm (112 in)	(Brazil) Minas Tênis Clube
9	Roberta Ratzke	28 April 1990	1.85 m (6 ft 1 in)	71 kg (157 lb)	287 cm (113 in)	278 cm (109 in)	(Brazil) Rio de Janeiro
10	Gabriela Guimarães	19 May 1994	1.76 m (5 ft 9 in)	69 kg (152 lb)	295 cm (116 in)	274 cm (108 in)	(Brazil) Rio de Janeiro
12	Natália Pereira (c)	4 April 1989	1.84 m (6 ft 0 in)	76 kg (168 lb)	300 cm (120 in)	288 cm (113 in)	(Turkey) Fenerbahçe
14	Drussyla Costa	1 July 1996	1.82 m (6 ft 0 in)	73 kg (161 lb)	304 cm (120 in)	286 cm (113 in)	(Brazil) Rio de Janeiro
16	Fernanda Garay	10 May 1986	1.79 m (5 ft 10 in)	74 kg (163 lb)	308 cm (121 in)	288 cm (113 in)	(Brazil) Praia Clube
17	Suelen Pinto	4 October 1987	1.66 m (5 ft 5 in)	81 kg (179 lb)	256 cm (101 in)	238 cm (94 in)	(Brazil) Praia Clube
19	Tandara Caixeta	30 October 1988	1.84 m (6 ft 0 in)	87 kg (192 lb)	305 cm (120 in)	297 cm (117 in)	(Brazil) Osasco
20	Ana Beatriz Corrêa	7 February 1992	1.87 m (6 ft 2 in)	70 kg (150 lb)	298 cm (117 in)	292 cm (115 in)	(Brazil) Osasco

=== Dominican Republic ===
The following is the Dominican roster in the 2018 World Championship.

Head coach: Marcos Kwiek

No.	Name	Date of birth	Height	Weight	Spike	Block	2017–18 club
1	Annerys Vargas	7 August 1981	1.96 m (6 ft 5 in)	70 kg (150 lb)	327 cm (129 in)	320 cm (130 in)	Free agent
3	Lisvel Elisa Eve	10 September 1991	1.94 m (6 ft 4 in)	70 kg (150 lb)	325 cm (128 in)	315 cm (124 in)	(Dominican Republic) Puerto Plata
5	Brenda Castillo	5 June 1992	1.67 m (5 ft 6 in)	55 kg (121 lb)	245 cm (96 in)	230 cm (91 in)	(Dominican Republic) San Cristóbal
6	Camil Domínguez	7 December 1991	1.76 m (5 ft 9 in)	75 kg (165 lb)	232 cm (91 in)	275 cm (108 in)	(Dominican Republic) Mirador
7	Niverka Marte	19 October 1990	1.78 m (5 ft 10 in)	71 kg (157 lb)	295 cm (116 in)	283 cm (111 in)	(Dominican Republic) Deportivo Nacional
8	Cándida Arias	11 March 1992	1.94 m (6 ft 4 in)	68 kg (150 lb)	320 cm (130 in)	315 cm (124 in)	(Dominican Republic) San Cristóbal
14	Prisilla Rivera	29 December 1984	1.83 m (6 ft 0 in)	67 kg (148 lb)	309 cm (122 in)	305 cm (120 in)	(Dominican Republic) San Pedro de Macorís
16	Yonkaira Peña	10 May 1993	1.90 m (6 ft 3 in)	70 kg (150 lb)	320 cm (130 in)	310 cm (120 in)	(Brazil) Rio de Janeiro
17	Gina Mambrú	21 January 1986	1.82 m (6 ft 0 in)	65 kg (143 lb)	330 cm (130 in)	315 cm (124 in)	(Dominican Republic) Los Cachorros
18	Bethania de la Cruz (c)	13 May 1987	1.88 m (6 ft 2 in)	70 kg (150 lb)	330 cm (130 in)	320 cm (130 in)	(Italy) Scandicci
20	Brayelin Martínez	11 September 1996	2.01 m (6 ft 7 in)	83 kg (183 lb)	330 cm (130 in)	320 cm (130 in)	(Italy) Casalmaggiore
21	Jineiry Martínez	3 December 1997	1.90 m (6 ft 3 in)	68 kg (150 lb)	305 cm (120 in)	280 cm (110 in)	(Dominican Republic) Mirador
23	Gaila González	25 June 1997	1.88 m (6 ft 2 in)	73 kg (161 lb)	304 cm (120 in)	276 cm (109 in)	(Dominican Republic) Mirador
25	Larysmer Martínez	18 October 1996	1.74 m (5 ft 9 in)	68 kg (150 lb)	288 cm (113 in)	258 cm (102 in)	(Dominican Republic) Deportivo Nacional

=== Kazakhstan ===
The following is the Kazakhstan roster in the 2018 World Championship.

Head coach: Vyacheslav Shapran

No.	Name	Date of birth	Height	Weight	Spike	Block	2017–18 club
1	Tatyana Fendrikova	23 February 1990	1.69 m (5 ft 7 in)	55 kg (121 lb)	280 cm (110 in)	275 cm (108 in)	(Kazakhstan) Almaty VC
3	Sana Anarkulova	21 July 1989	1.88 m (6 ft 2 in)	77 kg (170 lb)	300 cm (120 in)	280 cm (110 in)	(Kazakhstan) Altay VC
4	Yekaterina Zhdanova	28 May 1992	1.83 m (6 ft 0 in)	65 kg (143 lb)	280 cm (110 in)	270 cm (110 in)	(Kazakhstan) Zhetyssu VC
6	Natalya Akilova	31 May 1993	1.83 m (6 ft 0 in)	62 kg (137 lb)	295 cm (116 in)	275 cm (108 in)	(Kazakhstan) Zhetyssu VC
7	Inna Yakovleva	4 March 1988	1.77 m (5 ft 10 in)	65 kg (143 lb)	208 cm (82 in)	217 cm (85 in)	(Kazakhstan) Almaty VC
11	Katerina Tatko	15 December 1992	1.82 m (6 ft 0 in)	70 kg (150 lb)	285 cm (112 in)	275 cm (108 in)	(Kazakhstan) Zhetyssu VC
12	Yana Petrenko	30 July 1990	1.81 m (5 ft 11 in)	71 kg (157 lb)	297 cm (117 in)	265 cm (104 in)	(Kazakhstan) Almaty VC
13	Radmila Beresneva (c)	6 June 1983	1.85 m (6 ft 1 in)	70 kg (150 lb)	300 cm (120 in)	295 cm (116 in)	(Kazakhstan) Irtysh-Kazchrome
14	Alessya Safronova	10 February 1986	1.92 m (6 ft 4 in)	70 kg (150 lb)	290 cm (110 in)	280 cm (110 in)	(Kazakhstan) Altay VC
15	Aliya Batkuldina	18 November 1995	1.81 m (5 ft 11 in)	74 kg (163 lb)	273 cm (107 in)	264 cm (104 in)	(Kazakhstan) Almaty VC
16	Yekaterina Razorenkova	3 June 1993	1.85 m (6 ft 1 in)	69 kg (152 lb)	283 cm (111 in)	280 cm (110 in)	(Kazakhstan) Almaty VC
19	Kristina Belova	29 November 1998	1.82 m (6 ft 0 in)	72 kg (159 lb)	244 cm (96 in)	285 cm (112 in)	(Kazakhstan) Irtysh-Kazchrome
22	Zhanna Syroeshkina	4 June 1999	1.82 m (6 ft 0 in)	77 kg (170 lb)	244 cm (96 in)	232 cm (91 in)	(Kazakhstan) Volleyball Academy
24	Kristina Karapetan	3 August 1992	1.85 m (6 ft 1 in)	73 kg (161 lb)	280 cm (110 in)	272 cm (107 in)	

=== Kenya ===
The following is the Kenyan roster in the 2018 World Championship.

Head coach: Japheth Munala

No.	Name	Date of birth	Height	Weight	Spike	Block	2017–18 club
1	Jane Wairimu	24 March 1985	1.75 m (5 ft 9 in)	60 kg (130 lb)	299 cm (118 in)	286 cm (113 in)	Kenya Prisons
2	Christine Psiwa	1 April 1992	1.75 m (5 ft 9 in)	62 kg (137 lb)	301 cm (119 in)	298 cm (117 in)	Kenya Pipelines
3	Violet Makuto	20 May 1993	1.67 m (5 ft 6 in)	65 kg (143 lb)	298 cm (117 in)	290 cm (110 in)	Kenya Pipelines
4	Leonida Kasaya	10 October 1993	1.68 m (5 ft 6 in)	67 kg (148 lb)	297 cm (117 in)	292 cm (115 in)	Kenya Pipelines
5	Sharon Chepchumba	26 October 1998	1.83 m (6 ft 0 in)	82 kg (181 lb)	293 cm (115 in)	281 cm (111 in)	Kenya Prisons
7	Janet Wanja	24 February 1984	1.75 m (5 ft 9 in)	59 kg (130 lb)	299 cm (118 in)	287 cm (113 in)	Kenya Pipelines
8	Triza Atuka	14 April 1992	1.88 m (6 ft 2 in)	65 kg (143 lb)	298 cm (117 in)	293 cm (115 in)	Kenya Pipelines
9	Elizabeth Wanyama	27 May 1987	1.74 m (5 ft 9 in)	68 kg (150 lb)	270 cm (110 in)	260 cm (100 in)	Kenya Prisons
10	Noel Murambi	29 January 1989	1.78 m (5 ft 10 in)	68 kg (150 lb)	302 cm (119 in)	297 cm (117 in)	Kenya Pipelines
14	Mercy Moim (c)	1 January 1989	1.83 m (6 ft 0 in)	72 kg (159 lb)	320 cm (130 in)	303 cm (119 in)	Kenya Prisons
15	Lorine Chebet	8 October 1999	1.79 m (5 ft 10 in)	69 kg (152 lb)	285 cm (112 in)	270 cm (110 in)	Kenya Prisons
16	Agripina Kundu	24 April 1993	1.65 m (5 ft 5 in)	66 kg (146 lb)	294 cm (116 in)	288 cm (113 in)	Kenya Pipelines
18	Emmaculate Chemtai	14 October 1993	1.80 m (5 ft 11 in)	68 kg (150 lb)	300 cm (120 in)	285 cm (112 in)	Kenya Prisons
19	Edith Mukuvilani	20 July 1994	1.84 m (6 ft 0 in)	72 kg (159 lb)	298 cm (117 in)	292 cm (115 in)	Kenya Prisons

=== Puerto Rico ===
The following is the Puerto Rican roster in the 2018 World Championship.

Head coach: José Mieles

No.	Name	Date of birth	Height	Weight	Spike	Block	2017–18 club
1	Daly Santana	19 February 1995	1.82 m (6 ft 0 in)	72 kg (159 lb)	243 cm (96 in)	219 cm (86 in)	(Italy) Il Bisonte Firenze
2	Shara Venegas	18 September 1992	1.73 m (5 ft 8 in)	68 kg (150 lb)	280 cm (110 in)	272 cm (107 in)	(Puerto Rico) Llaneras de Toa Baja
3	Valeria León	21 May 1995	1.66 m (5 ft 5 in)	67 kg (148 lb)	248 cm (98 in)	242 cm (95 in)	(Puerto Rico) Leonas de Ponce
4	Raymariely Santos	13 April 1992	1.83 m (6 ft 0 in)	73 kg (161 lb)	290 cm (110 in)	288 cm (113 in)	(Puerto Rico) Indias de Mayagüez
5	Julymar Otero	31 October 1996	1.77 m (5 ft 10 in)	65 kg (143 lb)	235 cm (93 in)	239 cm (94 in)	Free agent
7	Stephanie Enright	15 December 1990	1.79 m (5 ft 10 in)	56 kg (123 lb)	300 cm (120 in)	292 cm (115 in)	(Italy) Igor Gorgonzola Novara
11	Karina Ocasio	1 August 1985	1.92 m (6 ft 4 in)	76 kg (168 lb)	298 cm (117 in)	288 cm (113 in)	(Puerto Rico) Criollas de Caguas
12	Neira Ortiz	6 July 1993	1.92 m (6 ft 4 in)	68 kg (150 lb)	262 cm (103 in)	256 cm (101 in)	Free agent
14	Natalia Valentín (c)	12 September 1989	1.70 m (5 ft 7 in)	61 kg (134 lb)	244 cm (96 in)	240 cm (94 in)	(France) Saint-Raphaël Var VB
17	Noami Santos	29 November 1995	1.92 m (6 ft 4 in)	63 kg (139 lb)	309 cm (122 in)	300 cm (120 in)	(Puerto Rico) Capitalinas de San Juan
18	Alba Hernández	3 October 1995	2.07 m (6 ft 9 in)	87 kg (192 lb)	305 cm (120 in)	293 cm (115 in)	(Puerto Rico) Changas de Naranjito
19	Ana Sofía Jusino	5 January 1995	1.89 m (6 ft 2 in)	65 kg (143 lb)	310 cm (120 in)	294 cm (116 in)	(Puerto Rico) Criollas de Caguas
22	Adriana Vinas Joy	1 March 1994	1.78 m (5 ft 10 in)	74 kg (163 lb)	245 cm (96 in)	237 cm (93 in)	(Puerto Rico) Gigantes de Carolina
23	Diana Reyes	29 April 1993	1.91 m (6 ft 3 in)	80 kg (180 lb)	303 cm (119 in)	299 cm (118 in)	(Puerto Rico) Criollas de Caguas

=== Serbia ===
The following is the Serbian roster in the 2018 World Championship.

Head coach: Zoran Terzić

No.	Name	Date of birth	Height	Weight	Spike	Block	2017–18 club
1	Bianka Buša	25 July 1994	1.87 m (6 ft 2 in)	74 kg (163 lb)	312 cm (123 in)	298 cm (117 in)	(Poland) Police
4	Bojana Živković	29 March 1988	1.86 m (6 ft 1 in)	70 kg (150 lb)	298 cm (117 in)	283 cm (111 in)	(France) Le Cannet
6	Tijana Malešević	18 March 1991	1.85 m (6 ft 1 in)	78 kg (172 lb)	300 cm (120 in)	286 cm (113 in)	(Romania) Alba Blaj
9	Brankica Mihajlović	13 April 1991	1.90 m (6 ft 3 in)	83 kg (183 lb)	302 cm (119 in)	290 cm (110 in)	(Japan) JT Marvelous
10	Maja Ognjenović (c)	6 August 1984	1.83 m (6 ft 0 in)	67 kg (148 lb)	300 cm (120 in)	293 cm (115 in)	(Turkey) Eczacıbaşı VitrA
11	Stefana Veljković	9 January 1990	1.90 m (6 ft 3 in)	76 kg (168 lb)	325 cm (128 in)	310 cm (120 in)	(Poland) Police
12	Teodora Pušić	12 March 1993	1.70 m (5 ft 7 in)	58 kg (128 lb)	270 cm (110 in)	260 cm (100 in)	(Germany) Stuttgart
13	Ana Bjelica	3 April 1992	1.90 m (6 ft 3 in)	78 kg (172 lb)	310 cm (120 in)	305 cm (120 in)	(Switzerland) Voléro Zürich
14	Maja Aleksić	6 June 1997	1.88 m (6 ft 2 in)	72 kg (159 lb)	302 cm (119 in)	289 cm (114 in)	(Serbia) Vizura
15	Jovana Stevanović	30 June 1992	1.92 m (6 ft 4 in)	72 kg (159 lb)	308 cm (121 in)	295 cm (116 in)	(Italy) Casalmaggiore
16	Milena Rašić	25 October 1990	1.93 m (6 ft 4 in)	72 kg (159 lb)	315 cm (124 in)	310 cm (120 in)	(Turkey) Vakıfbank Istanbul
17	Silvija Popović	15 March 1986	1.78 m (5 ft 10 in)	65 kg (143 lb)	286 cm (113 in)	276 cm (109 in)	(Switzerland) Voléro Zürich
18	Tijana Bošković	8 March 1997	1.93 m (6 ft 4 in)	82 kg (181 lb)	315 cm (124 in)	300 cm (120 in)	(Turkey) Eczacıbaşı VitrA
19	Bojana Milenković	6 March 1997	1.85 m (6 ft 1 in)	70 kg (150 lb)	294 cm (116 in)	288 cm (113 in)	(Serbia) Crvena Zvezda

== See also ==
- 2018 FIVB Volleyball Men's World Championship squads
