= Travaglini =

Travaglini is an Italian surname. Notable people with the surname include:

- Alessia Travaglini (born 1988), Italian volleyball player
- Gabriel Travaglini (born 1958), Argentine rugby union player
- Mário Travaglini (1932–2014), Brazilian football manager and player
- Robert Travaglini (born 1952), American politician and lobbyist from Massachusetts
