= 2019 FIVB Women's Volleyball Challenger Cup =

International volleyball tournament

Copa Challenger de Femenino Perú 2019

Tournament details
- Host country: Peru
- City: Lima
- Dates: 26–30 June
- Teams: 6 (from 4 confederations)
- Venue: 1 (in 1 host city)

Final positions
- Champions: Canada (1st title)
- Runners-up: Czech Republic
- Third place: Argentina
- Fourth place: Croatia

Tournament statistics
- Matches played: 10
- Attendance: 6,600 (660 per match)
- Best scorer: (Canada) Alexa Lea Gray (77 points)
- Best spiker: (Canada) Alexa Lea Gray (51.49%)
- Best blocker: (Canada) Emily Maglio (0.93 Avg)
- Best server: (Croatia) Samanta Fabris (0.57 Avg)
- Best setter: (Peru) Zoila La Rosa (6.00 Avg)
- Best digger: (Peru) Vanessa Palacios (4.63 Avg)
- Best receiver: (Argentina) Tatiana Rizzo (27.69%)

The 2019 FIVB Women's Volleyball Challenger Cup was the second edition of the FIVB Women's Volleyball Challenger Cup, an annual women's international volleyball tournament contested by six national teams that acts as a qualifier for the FIVB Women's Volleyball Nations League. The tournament was held in Lima, Peru.

Canada won the title, defeating the Czech Republic in the final, and earned the right to participate in the 2020 Nations League replacing Bulgaria, the last placed challenger team after the 2019 edition. Argentina defeated Croatia in the 3rd place match.

On 8 May 2020, FIVB announced that the 2020 Nations League and 2020 Challenger Cup was canceled due to COVID-19 pandemic. So the tournament eventually became the 2021 Nations League qualifier.

== Qualification ==
A total of 6 teams qualified for the tournament.

Country	Confederation	Qualified as	Qualified on	Previous appearances			Previous best performance
Country	Confederation	Qualified as	Qualified on	Total	First	Last	Previous best performance
Canada	NORCECA	North American Qualifier champions	2 June 2019	0	None		None
Chinese Taipei	AVC	1st World ranked team from AVC	12 June 2019	0	None		None
Argentina^{a}	CSV	1st World ranked team from CSV	12 June 2019	0	None		None
Peru	CSV	Host country	17 June 2019	1	2018		4th place (2018)
Czech Republic	CEV	2019 Golden League champions	22 June 2019	0	None		None
Croatia	CEV	2019 Golden League runner-up	22 June 2019	0	None		None

Note
^a No team from African Volleyball Confederation participated in qualification process. So, the team from South American Volleyball Confederation automatically qualified for the tournament.

== Pools composition ==
Teams will be seeded following the serpentine system according to their FIVB World Ranking as of 21 October 2018. FIVB reserved the right to seed the hosts as head of pool A regardless of the World Ranking. Rankings are shown in brackets except the hosts who ranked 27th.

Pool A	Pool B
Peru (Hosts)	Argentina (11)
Czech Republic (24)	Canada (18)
Croatia (30)	Chinese Taipei (33)

== Venue ==
- Manuel Bonilla Stadium, Lima, Peru

== Pool standing procedure ==
1. Number of matches won
2. Match points
3. Sets ratio
4. Points ratio
5. Result of the last match between the tied teams

Match won 3–0 or 3–1: 3 match points for the winner, 0 match points for the loser
Match won 3–2: 2 match points for the winner, 1 match point for the loser

== Preliminary round ==
- All times are Peru Time (UTC-05:00).

=== Pool A ===
Pos	Team	Pld	W	L	Pts	SW	SL	SR	SPW	SPL	SPR	Qualification
1	Czech Republic	2	2	0	6	6	2	3.000	194	160	1.213	Semifinals
2	Croatia	2	1	1	3	4	4	1.000	168	189	0.889	Semifinals
3	Peru	2	0	2	0	2	6	0.333	186	199	0.935	

Date	Time		Score		Set 1	Set 2	Set 3	Set 4	Set 5	Total	Report
26 Jun	20:00	Peru	1–3	Croatia	23–25	25–19	17–25	29–31		94–100	P2 Report
27 Jun	20:00	Czech Republic	3–1	Croatia	20–25	25–12	25–16	25–15		95–68	P2 Report
28 Jun	20:00	Peru	1–3	Czech Republic	25–27	25–22	21–25	21–25		92–99	P2 Report

=== Pool B ===
Pos	Team	Pld	W	L	Pts	SW	SL	SR	SPW	SPL	SPR	Qualification
1	Canada	2	2	0	6	6	0	MAX	150	116	1.293	Semifinals
2	Argentina	2	1	1	3	3	3	1.000	142	140	1.014	Semifinals
3	Chinese Taipei	2	0	2	0	0	6	0.000	114	150	0.760	

Date	Time		Score		Set 1	Set 2	Set 3	Set 4	Set 5	Total	Report
26 Jun	17:00	Argentina	3–0	Chinese Taipei	25–22	25–22	25–21			75–65	P2 Report
27 Jun	17:00	Canada	3–0	Chinese Taipei	25–16	25–17	25–16			75–49	P2 Report
28 Jun	17:00	Argentina	0–3	Canada	23–25	21–25	23–25			67–75	P2 Report

== Final round ==
- All times are Peru Time (UTC-05:00).

Semifinals
29 June – Lima
Czech Republic	3
Argentina	0
29 June – Lima
Canada	3
Croatia	0

Final
30 June – Lima
Czech Republic	2
Canada	3
3rd place match
30 June – Lima
Argentina	3
Croatia	0

=== Semifinals ===
Date	Time		Score		Set 1	Set 2	Set 3	Set 4	Set 5	Total	Report
29 Jun	17:00	Czech Republic	3–0	Argentina	25–16	25–19	25–23			75–58	P2 Report
29 Jun	20:00	Canada	3–0	Croatia	25–18	25–20	26–24			76–62	P2 Report

=== 3rd place match ===
Date	Time		Score		Set 1	Set 2	Set 3	Set 4	Set 5	Total	Report
30 Jun	16:00	Argentina	3–0	Croatia	25–19	25–18	25–14			75–51	P2 Report

=== Final ===
Date	Time		Score		Set 1	Set 2	Set 3	Set 4	Set 5	Total	Report
30 Jun	19:00	Czech Republic	2–3	Canada	17–25	16–25	25–21	25–23	8–15	91–109	P2 Report

== Final standing ==
Rank	Team
1st place, gold medalist(s)	Canada
2nd place, silver medalist(s)	Czech Republic
3rd place, bronze medalist(s)	Argentina
4	Croatia
5	Peru
6	Chinese Taipei

Qualified for the 2021 Nations League

Source: VCC 2019 final standing

2019 Women's Challenger Cup champions

Canada
1st title

14–women Roster
Kyla Richey (c), Jessica Niles, Autumn Bailey, Kiera Van Ryk, Danielle Smith, Alicia Ogoms, Alexa Lea Gray, Andrea Mitrovic, Jennifer Cross, Shainah Joseph, Kristen Moncks, Alicia Perrin, Megan Cyr, Emily Maglio
Head coach
Thomas Black

== See also ==
- 2019 FIVB Women's Volleyball Nations League
- 2019 FIVB Men's Volleyball Challenger Cup
- 2019 FIVB Men's Volleyball Nations League
