= Alexa Gray =

Canadian volleyball player (born 1994)

Alexa Lea Gray
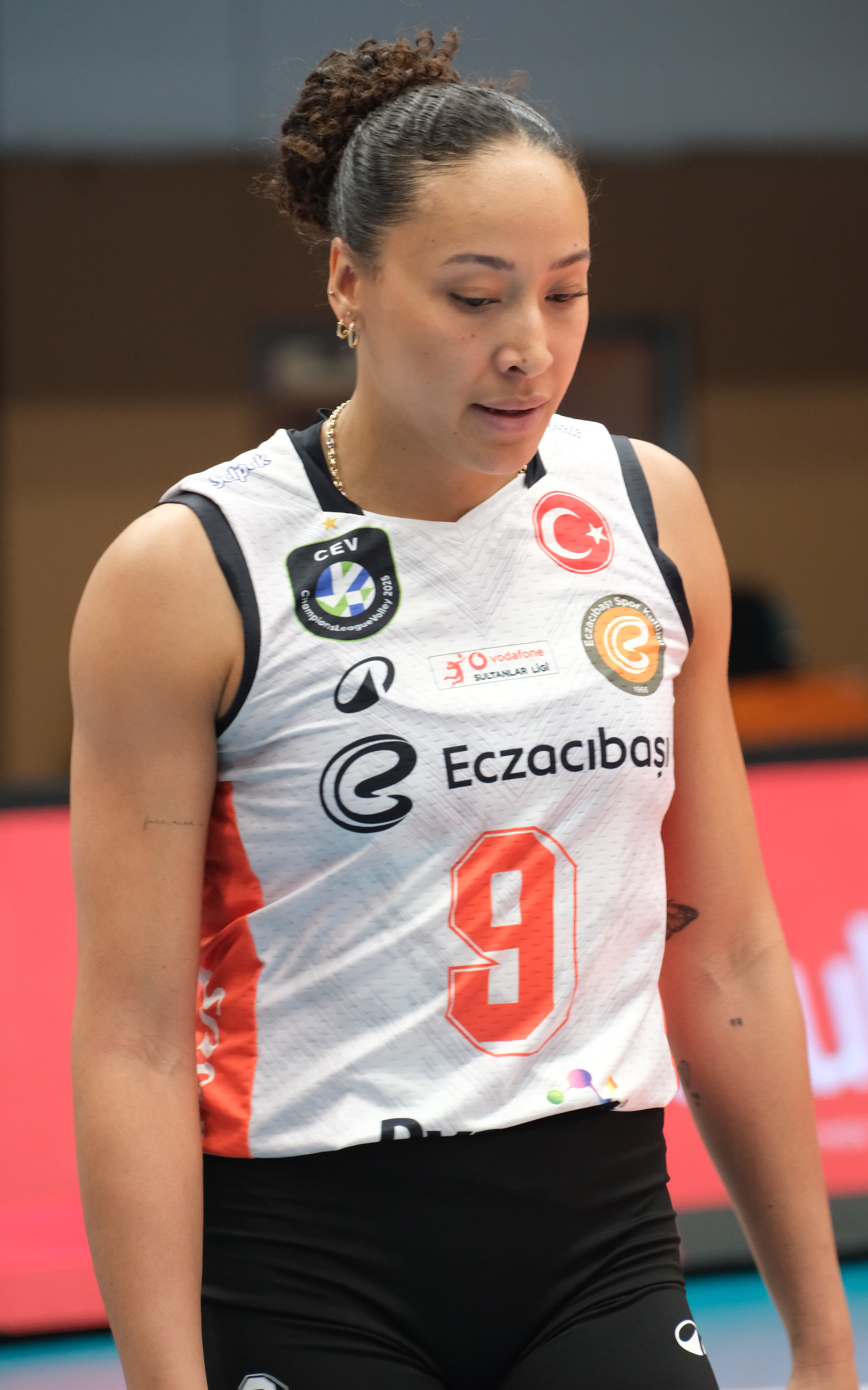
- Gray playing for Eczacıbaşı in 2025

Personal information
- Nationality: (Canada) Canadian
- Born: August 7, 1994 (age 32); Lethbridge, Alberta
- Hometown: Calgary, Alberta
- Height: 185 cm (6 ft 1 in)
- Spike: 323 cm (127 in)
- Block: 315 cm (124 in)
- Education: BYU

Volleyball information
- Position: Outside hitter
- Current club: LOVB Salt Lake
- Number: 9 (national team); 9 (club)

Career
Years	Teams
2008–2011	(Canada) Calgary Dinos
2012–2015	(United States) BYU
2016–2017	(South Korea) GS Caltex Seoul KIXX
2017–2018	(Italy) Volley Soverato
2018–2019	(Italy) Casalmaggiore
2019–2020	(Italy) Golden Tulip Volalto Caserta
2019–2020	(Italy) Scandicci
2020–2022	(Italy) Busto
2022–2023	(Italy) Imoco Volley Conegliano
2023-2025	(Turkey) Eczacıbaşı
2026-	(United States) LOVB Salt Lake City

National team
2017–present	Canada
Honours
Women's volleyball
Representing Canada
NORCECA Championship
Gold medal – first place	2026 Santo Domingo	Team
Bronze medal – third place	2019 San Juan	Team
Pan-American Cup
Bronze medal – third place	2018 Santo Domingo	Team
FIVB Challenger Cup
Gold medal – first place	2019 Lima	Team

Alexa Lea Gray (born August 7, 1994) is a Canadian volleyball player. She is part of the Canadian women's national volleyball team. Professionally, she plays for the Turkish club Eczacıbaşı Dynavit.

== Personal life ==
Gray attended high school at Centennial High School in Calgary. She began playing volleyball in sixth grade and played for Calgary Dinos women’s volleyball club and helped them to U15 and U17 provincial champ titles and U16 and U17 national champ title.

She also played rugby and basketball in high school.

Gray has attributed her motivation to her late mother, Stacey French. Her mother was also an athlete and played basketball at Southern Utah. When Gray was 13, she and her older sister Jordan Gray survived a car accident that claimed her mother's life. While driving from Montana, an elk struck the car, causing it to roll several times. Gray's father, Evric Gray, played basketball at UNLV and is a high school basketball coach.

Gray is a Mormon, and opted to attend Brigham Young University to play in college.

== Career ==
=== College ===
Gray played for BYU and was three time All-American. In her first season in 2012, she was named West Coast Conference Freshman of the Year. She won West Coast Conference player of the year back-to-back in 2014 and 2015. She helped BYU to a national runner up finish in 2014, the first time BYU ever made it to a championship match.

She finished her career at BYU ranked second in kills and attempts and sixth in points (all which ranked first during rally-scoring era) and sets played.

=== Professional clubs ===
- (South Korea) GS Caltex Seoul KIXX (2016–2017)
- (Italy) Volley Soverato (2017–2018)
- (Italy) Casalmaggiore (2018–2019)
- (Italy) Golden Tulip Volalto Caserta (2019–2020)
- (Italy) Scandicci (2019–2020)
- (Italy) Busto (2020–2022)
- (Italy) Imoco Volley Conegliano (2022-2023)
- (Turkey) Eczacıbaşı Dynavit (2023–2025)
- (United States) LOVB Salt Lake (2025-)

=== Canadian national team ===
Gray joined the Canadian national team in 2017.

She participated at the 2018 FIVB Volleyball Women's World Championship, 2018 Women's Pan-American Volleyball Cup, and 2019 FIVB Volleyball Women's Challenger Cup. She has won international awards with the national team: she was named "Best Scorer" and "Best Spiker" at the 2019 FIVB Volleyball Women's Challenger Cup and "Best Spiker" at the 2019 Women's NORCECA Volleyball Championship. She was named the MVP at the 2019 FIVB Volleyball Women's Challenger Cup qualification.

== Awards and honors ==
=== College ===
- AVCA All American – First Team (2015); Second Team (2014); Third Team (2013)
- West Coast Conference Player of the Year – 2014, 2015
- West Coast Conference Freshman of the Year – 2012

=== Clubs ===
- 2022–23 Italian League - Champion, with Imoco Volley Conegliano 2022-23 MVP of 5th and deciding match vs. Vero Volley Milano
- 2022-23 Italian Cup (Coppa Italia) - Champion, with Imoco Volley Conegliano
- 2022 Italian Supercup - Champions, with Imoco Volley Conegliano
- 2022 FIVB Volleyball Women's Club World Championship - Champion, with Imoco Volley Conegliano
- 2023 FIVB Volleyball Women's Club World Championship - Champion, with Eczacıbaşı Dynavit

=== International ===
- 2019 Women's NORCECA Volleyball Championship – Best Spiker
- 2019 FIVB Volleyball Women's Challenger Cup – Best Spiker
- 2019 FIVB Volleyball Women's Challenger Cup – Best Scorer
- 2019 FIVB Volleyball Women's Challenger Cup qualification – Most Valuable Player
- 2022–23 Italian League "Most valuable player"

== Exteneral links ==
- Alexa Gray at Volleyball Canada
- Busto bio
- Alexa Gray at FIVB.com
- Alexa Gray at the European Volleyball Confederation
- Alexa Gray at Lega Pallavolo Serie A Femminile (in Italian)
- Alexa Gray at WorldofVolley
- Alexa Gray at Volleybox
