= 2019 FIVB Women's Volleyball Challenger Cup qualification =

The 2019 FIVB Women's Volleyball Challenger Cup qualification was a series of tournaments to decide which teams would play in the 2019 FIVB Women's Volleyball Challenger Cup. The 2019 Challenger Cup featured 6 teams. Only one place was allocated to the hosts. The remaining 5 places were determined by a qualification process, in which entrants from among the other teams from the five FIVB confederations competed.

== Qualification summary ==
A total of 6 teams qualified for the tournament.

Country	Confederation	Qualified as	Qualified on	Previous appearances			Previous best performance
Country	Confederation	Qualified as	Qualified on	Total	First	Last	Previous best performance
Canada	NORCECA	North American Qualifier champions	2 June 2019	0	None		None
Chinese Taipei	AVC	1st World ranked team from AVC	12 June 2019	0	None		None
Argentina^{a}	CSV	1st World ranked team from CSV	12 June 2019	0	None		None
Peru	CSV	Host country	17 June 2019	1	2018		4th place (2018)
Czech Republic	CEV	2019 Golden League champions	22 June 2019	0	None		None
Croatia	CEV	2019 Golden League runner-up	22 June 2019	0	None		None

Note
^a No team from African Volleyball Confederation participated in qualification process. So, the team from South American Volleyball Confederation automatically qualified for the tournament.

== Confederation qualification ==
=== AVC (Asia and Oceania) ===
FIVB selected Kazakhstan to represent the Asian team for 2019 FIVB Women's Volleyball Challenger Cup via FIVB World Rankings, because less than four teams participated in the qualification tournament. But Kazakhstan and Australia teams refused to participate.

FIVB Rank	AVC Rank	Team	WC 2015	OG 2016	WGP 2017	WCH 2018	Total
23	5	Kazakhstan	0	1	6	25	32
30	6	Australia	0	0	4	12	16
33	7	Chinese Taipei	0	0	0	14	14

=== CEV (Europe) ===
==== Teams ====
- Austria (Golden league)
- Azerbaijan (Golden league)
- Belarus (Golden league → final round)
- Czech Republic (Golden league → final round → qualified)
- Croatia (Golden league → final round → qualified)
- Finland (Golden league)
- France (Golden league)
- Hungary (Golden league)
- Slovakia (Golden league)
- Spain (Golden league → final round)
- Sweden (Golden league)
- Ukraine (Golden league)

==== League round ====
Rank	Team
1st place, gold medalist(s)	Czech Republic
2nd place, silver medalist(s)	Croatia
3rd place, bronze medalist(s)	Belarus
4	Spain
5	Hungary
6	Ukraine
7	Slovakia
8	Austria
9	Finland
10	France
11	Azerbaijan
12	Sweden

Qualified for the 2019 Challenger Cup

=== CSV (South America) ===
FIVB selected Argentina to represent the South American team for 2019 FIVB Women's Volleyball Challenger Cup via FIVB World Rankings.

FIVB Rank	CSV Rank	Team	WC 2015	OG 2016	WGP 2017	WCH 2018	Total
11	2	Argentina	25	30	8	30	93

=== NORCECA (North America) ===
- Venue: Sportplex Beau-Chateau, Quebec, Canada
- Dates: 31 May-2 June 2018

==== Teams ====
- Canada (round robin → qualified)
- Mexico (round robin)
- Puerto Rico (round robin)
- ~~Cuba~~ (withdrew)

==== Final positions (round robin) ====
Pos	Team	Pld	W	L	Pts	SPW	SPL	SPR	SW	SL	SR	Qualification
1	Canada	2	2	0	10	6	0	MAX	6	0	MAX	2019 Challenger Cup
2	Puerto Rico	2	1	1	5	3	3	1.000	3	3	1.000	
3	Mexico	2	0	2	0	0	6	0.000	0	6	0.000	

== African–South American Playoff ==
=== Teams ===
Means of qualification	Date	Venue	Vacancies	Qualified
World Ranking for Africa	Decline	Decline	1	Decline
World Ranking for South America	12 June 2019	(Brazil) Rio de Janeiro	1	Argentina
Total			2	

=== Result ===
Date	Time		Score		Set 1	Set 2	Set 3	Set 4	Set 5	Total	Report
Decline	Decline	Argentina	3–0	bye	25–0	25–0	25–0			75–0	
