= 2019 FIVB Women's Volleyball Challenger Cup qualification (NORCECA) =

The North American section of the 2019 FIVB Women's Volleyball Challenger Cup qualification acted as the qualifiers section for the 2019 FIVB Women's Volleyball Challenger Cup, for national teams that were members of the North, Central America and Caribbean Volleyball Confederation (NORCECA). This tournament was held in Sportplex Beau-Chateau, Châteauguay, Quebec, Canada. The eventual winner earned the right to compete in the 2019 FIVB Women's Volleyball Challenger Cup.

== Qualification ==
The participating teams were the host plus the top three ranked teams of Norceca not qualified to the FIVB Nations League as of January 1, 2019.

2019 FIVB Challenger Cup NORCECA qualifiers
2019 FIVB Nations League eligible team
Withdrew

NORCECA	FIVB	Team	WC 2015	OG 2016	WGP 2017	WCH 2018	Total
1	3	United States	80	80	38	58	256
2	10	Dominican Republic	30	3	30	45	108
3	13	Puerto Rico	0	20	14	36	70
4	18	Canada	0	2	12	30	44
5	21	Mexico	0	0	2	33	35
6	25	Cuba	5	0	0	25	30

=== Qualified teams ===
4 NORCECA national teams entered qualification by FIVB Rankings.

- Canada (18) (Host)
- Puerto Rico (13)
- Mexico (21)
- ~~Cuba~~ (25)

== Pool standing procedure ==
1. Number of matches won
2. Match points
3. Sets ratio
4. Points ratio
5. Result of the last match between the tied teams

Match won 3–0: 5 match points for the winner, 0 match points for the loser
Match won 3–1: 4 match points for the winner, 1 match point for the loser
Match won 3–2: 3 match points for the winner, 2 match points for the loser

== Round robin ==
- Venue: Sportplex Beau-Chateau, Châteauguay, Quebec, Canada
- All times are Eastern Time Zone (UTC−04:00).

Pos	Team	Pld	W	L	Pts	SPW	SPL	SPR	SW	SL	SR	Qualification
1	Canada	2	2	0	10	6	0	MAX	6	0	MAX	2019 Challenger Cup
2	Puerto Rico	2	1	1	5	3	3	1.000	3	3	1.000	
3	Mexico	2	0	2	0	0	6	0.000	0	6	0.000	

Date	Time		Score		Set 1	Set 2	Set 3	Set 4	Set 5	Total	Report
31 May	18:00	Puerto Rico	3–0	Mexico	25–20	25–12	25–15			75–47	Report
1 Jun	18:00	Canada	3–0	Mexico	25–14	25–16	25–17			75–47	Report
2 Jun	14:00	Canada	3–0	Puerto Rico	25–21	25–20	25–20			75–61	Report
