= Melissa Donà =

Italian volleyball player

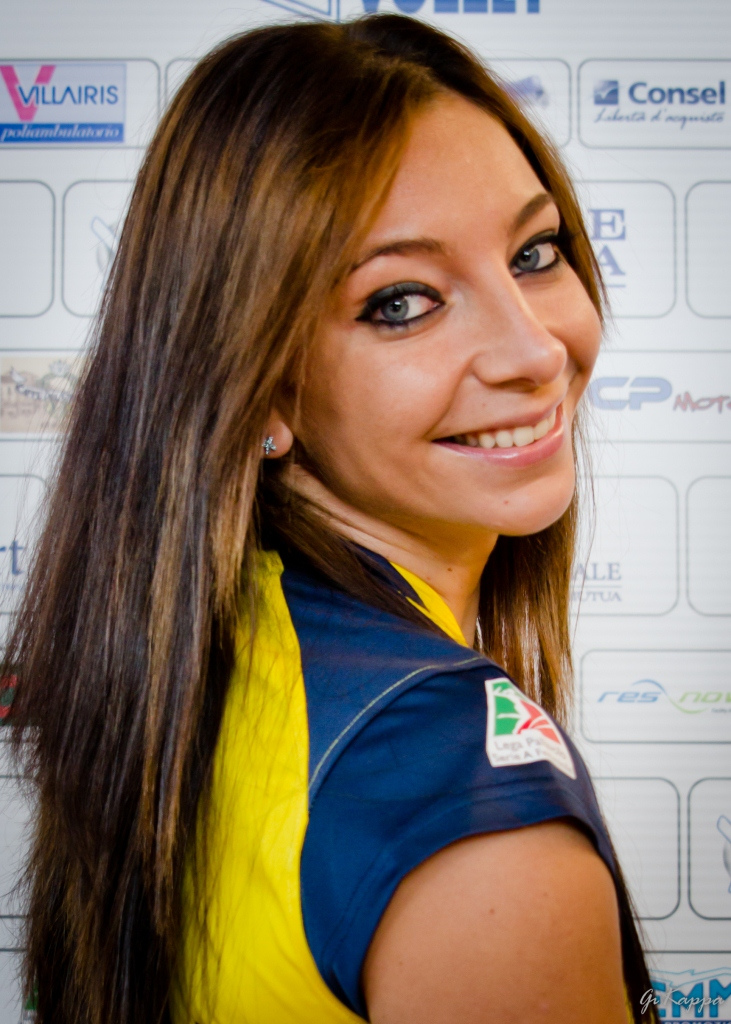
- Melissa in 2012

Personal information
- Nationality: Italy
- Born: 11 April 1982 (age 44); Treviso, Italy
- Hometown: Soverato, Italy
- Height: 1.80 m (5 ft 11 in)

Volleyball information
- Position: Hitter
- Current club: (Italy) Volley Soverato
- Number: 9

Career
Years	Teams
2015-2016	(Italy) Volley Soverato

Melissa Donà (born 11 April 1982 in Treviso) is an Italian professional volleyball player, playing as a hitter. She now plays for Volley Soverato.
