= Erika Mercado =

Ecuadorian–Argentine volleyball player (born 1992)

Érika Mercado
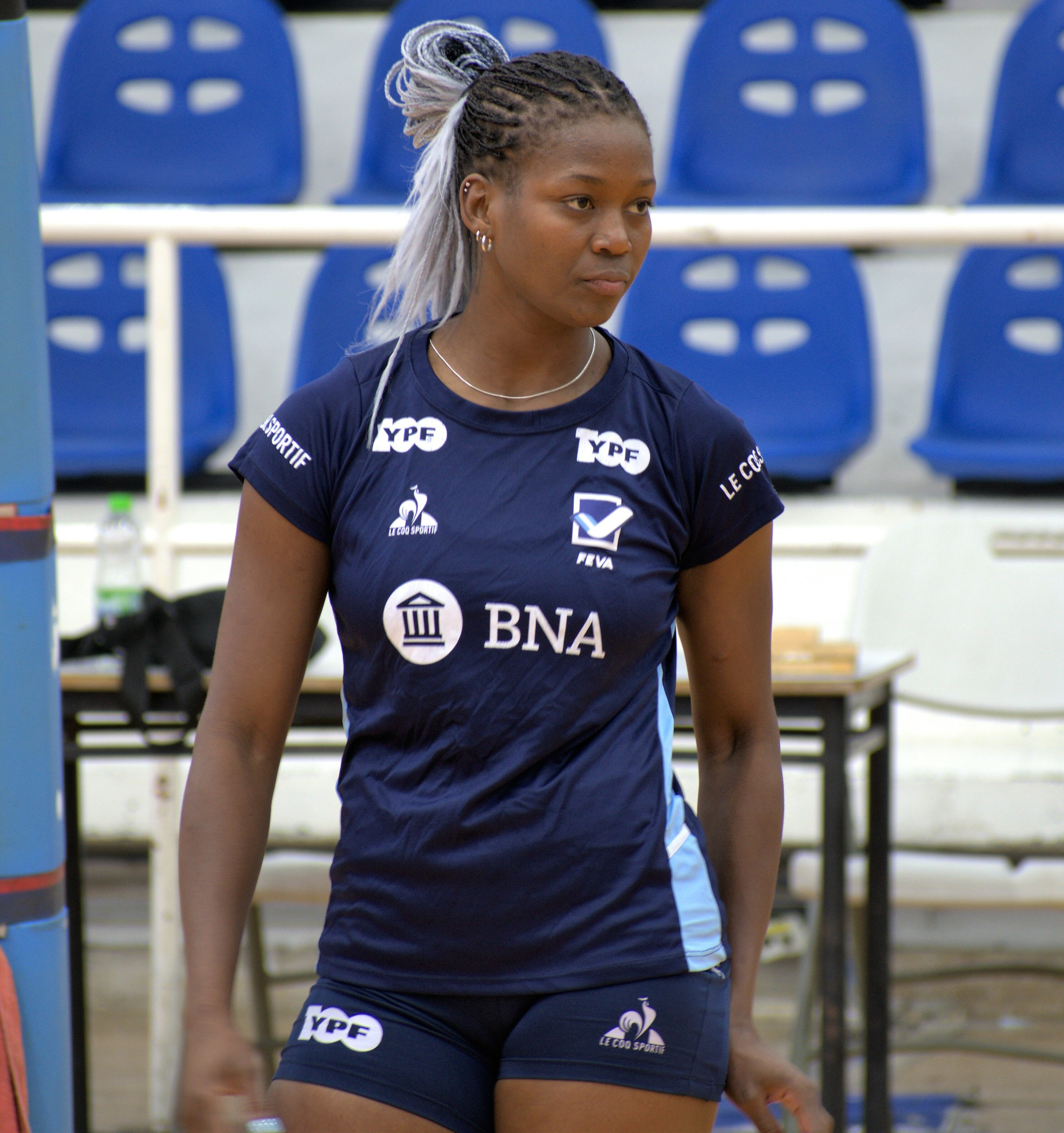
- Mercado in 2022

Personal information
- Full name: Érika Andreína Mercado Chávez
- Nationality: Ecuadorian, Argentine
- Born: Érika Andreína Mercado Chávez; 27 February 1992 (age 34) Esmeraldas, Ecuador
- Height: 1.85 m (6 ft 1 in)
- Weight: 82 kg (181 lb)

Sport
- Country: Argentina
- Sport: Volleyball
- Position: Opposite spiker
- Club: FC Porto

Érika Andreína Mercado Chávez (born 27 February 1992) is an Ecuadorian —naturalized Argentine— volleyball player. She plays as an opposite spiker for the Portuguese club FC Porto.
