= Alessia Travaglini =

Italian volleyball player (born 1988)

Personal information
- Nationality: Italian
- Born: 10 April 1988 (age 38); Ascoli Piceno
- Height: 1.88 cm (1 in)

Volleyball information
- Position: Middle blocker
- Current club: (Italy) P2P Givova Volley Baronissi

Career
Years	Teams
2006-2007; 2007-2008; 2008-2009; 2009-2010; 2010-2012; 2012-2017; 2018-2019; 2019-	(Italy) Monte Schiavo Jesi (Italy) Combitras Forlí (Italy) Monte Schiavo Jesi (Italy) Parma Volley Girls (Italy) Cadet 85 San Vito (Italy) Volley Soverato (Italy) P2P Givova Volley Baronissi (Italy) Golem Volley Palmi (Italy) P2P Givova Volley Baronissi

Alessia Travaglini (born 10 April 1988) is an Italian volleyball player, a member of the club P2P Givova Volley Baronissi.

== Sporting achievements ==
=== Clubs ===
Italian Championship:

- 2007

Challenge Cup:

- 2009
