= Volley Soverato =

- Full name: Volley Soverato
- Founded: 1994
- Ground: PalaScoppa, Soverato, Italy (Capacity: 550)
- Chairman: Antonio Matozzo
- Website: Club home page

Uniforms
Home	Away

Volley Soverato is an Italian women's volleyball club based in Soverato.

== Previous names ==
Due to sponsorship, the club have competed under the following names:

- Frigorcarni Soverato (2010–2011)
- Assitur Corriere Espresso Soverato (2011–2012)
- Volley Soverato (2012–present)

== History ==
The club was founded in 1994 and it played in the lower leagues (serie D and C) it reach the Serie B2 in 2000 and the Serie B1 in 2002. In the next following seasons the club struggled to remain in the Serie B1, until the president decided to build a team to fight for the promotion playoffs. After a total of eight seasons at Serie B1, the club achieved promotion to Serie A2 on 25 April 2010. The first two seasons at Serie A2 (2010–11 and 2011–12) proved difficult for the club, who fought to stay in the league. In the following two seasons (2012–13 and 2013–14) the club improved and reached the promotion playoffs. It had a bad season in 2014–15, finishing in the bottom four and avoided relegation by winning a play-out.

In 2024, Volley Soverato was relegated from Serie A2 to Serie B1. The club did not register for participation in Serie B1 the following season.

== Team ==
2017–2018 Team
Number	Player	Position	Height (m)	Weight (kg)	Birth date
1	(Italy) Barbara Bacciottini	Setter	1.81		28 July 1994 (age 31)
3	(Italy) Valeria Millesimo	Middle Blocker	1.85		27 April 1995 (age 30)
4	(Italy) Lucrezia Formenti	Outside Hitter	1.75		4 March 1996 (age 30)
6	(Italy) Giada Cecchetto	Libero	1.62		6 June 1991 (age 34)
7	(Poland) Natalia Gajewska	Setter	1.75		24 May 1994 (age 31)
8	(Italy) Serena Bertone	Middle Blocker	1.85		2 July 1995 (age 30)
9	(Italy) Melissa Donà	Outside Hitter	1.80	67	11 April 1982 (age 43)
10	(Canada) Alexa Gray	Outside Hitter	1.85		7 August 1994 (age 31)
11	(Italy) Laura Frigo	Middle Blocker	1.85	72	26 October 1990 (age 35)
12	(Italy) Alice Pizzasegola	Setter	1.75		3 March 1994 (age 32)
13	(Italy) Greta Valli	Outside Hitter	1.78		15 February 1992 (age 34)
14	(Italy) Giorgia Caforio	Libero	1.68		16 September 1994 (age 31)
16	(Italy) Veronica Taborelli	Outside Hitter	1.85		22 March 1994 (age 32)
18	(United States) Elizabeth McMahon	Opposite	1.95	80	27 February 1993 (age 33)

2016–2017 Team
Number	Player	Position	Height (m)	Weight (kg)	Birth date
1	(Italy) Marianna Vujko	Middle Blocker	1.92		15 May 1992 (age 33)
3	(Italy) Alessia Travaglini	Middle Blocker	1.88		10 April 1988 (age 37)
5	(Italy) Giorgia Caforio	Libero	1.68		16 September 1994 (age 31)
6	(France) Élisabeth Fedèle	Outside Hitter	1.75	62	11 January 1994 (age 32)
7	(Italy) Lara Caravello	Outside Hitter	1.76		4 May 1994 (age 31)
8	(Italy) Serena Bertone	Middle Blocker	1.85		2 July 1995 (age 30)
9	(Italy) Ilaria Demichelis	Setter	1.78		27 August 1987 (age 38)
10	(Italy) Carlotta Zanotto	Outside Hitter	1.81		1 July 1993 (age 32)
11	(Italy) Costanza Manfredini	Outside Hitter	1.88	67	16 July 1988 (age 37)
13	(Italy) Giulia Gennari	Setter	1.82		23 June 1996 (age 29)
17	(Bulgaria) Mariya Karakasheva	Outside Hitter	1.82	65	27 October 1988 (age 37)
18	(Italy) Veronica Bisconti	Libero	1.74	62	27 January 1991 (age 35)
