= Megan Cyr =

Canadian volleyball player (born 1990)

Personal information
- Nationality: Canada
- Born: 1 June 1990 (age 36)
- Hometown: St. Andrews, Manitoba
- Height: 1.82 m (6 ft 0 in)
- Education: North Carolina State University

Volleyball information
- Position: Setter

National team
2011 – present	Canada

Megan Cyr (born 1 June 1990) is a Canadian volleyball player. She is a member of the Canada women's national volleyball team, and has participated in several tournaments for the national team including the 2017 FIVB Volleyball Women's World Grand Prix, and 2018 FIVB Volleyball Women's World Championship. As a teenager she played volleyball in high school at Lord Selkirk High School in Selkirk, Manitoba.
