= Autumn Bailey =

Canadian volleyball player (born 1995)

Personal information
- Nationality: Canada
- Born: 2 June 1995 (age 31); Burlington, Ontario
- Height: 1.78 m (5 ft 10 in)
- Spike: 300 cm (120 in)
- Block: 280 cm (110 in)
- Education: Michigan State

Volleyball information
- Position: Wing spiker

National team
2013–present	Canada

Autumn Bailey (born 2 June 1995) is a Canadian female volleyball player. She was part of the Canada women's national volleyball team, and participated at the 2018 FIVB Volleyball Women's World Championship.

On club level she played for Marquette University, and Michigan State. She then joined Nilüfer Belediyespor, Turkey Venus League.
