= Jessica Niles =

American soprano

- Born: 1997 (age 27–28); Virginia, United States
- Education: Juilliard School
- Occupation: Operatic soprano
- Website: www.jessicaniles.com

Jessica Niles is an American operatic soprano, who made an international career based in Europe. She performs works from Baroque, such as Handel's Partenope at Oper Frankfurt, to contemporary music including the world premiere of Bernard Foccroulle's Cassandra at La Monnaie in Brussels.

== Life and career ==
Niles was born in Virginia. She studied voice at the Juilliard School in New York City, earning the Juilliard Vocal Arts Honors Recital, the Kovner fellowship and several awards during her studies. She joined the studio of the Bavarian State Opera in the 2021/22 season where she performed roles such as Sandrina in Haydn's L'infedeltà delusa, Voice from Heaven in Verdi's Don Carlo, Echo in Ariadne auf Naxos by R. Strauss, Taumännchen in Humperdinck's Hänsel und Gretel and Iris in a new production of Handel's Semele directed by Claus Guth. In the 2023/24 season she appeared at the house as Marzelline in Beethoven's Fidelio, Clorinda in Rossini's La Cenerentola, and the Young shepherd in Wagner's Tannhäuser.

In 2023, Niles appeared in the world premiere of Bernard Foccroulle's Cassandra at La Monnaie in Brussels, and in 2025 with Staatsoper Berlin. She made her debut at the Oper Frankfurt in the title role of Handel's Partenope in 2024. She performed at the Salzburg Festival as Alexandra in Weinberg's The Idiot.

Niles recorded Mendelssohn’s Elijah with the Munich Radio Orchestra for radio, and vocal works by Gloria Coates with the Munich Chamber Orchestra. She received the Munich Opera Festival's 2023 prize. She sang in Handel's Aminta e Filide in concert performances with Les Arts Florissants conducted by William Christie at the Opéra royal du château de Versailles, and also at the Castell de Peralada Festival.
