= List of official matches of the Montenegro women's national volleyball team =

The Montenegro women's national volleyball team is the national team of Montenegro. It is governed by the Volleyball Federation of Montenegro and takes part in international volleyball competitions.
Soon after the Montenegrin independence referendum, Volleyball Federation of Montenegro founded national teams. Women's team started to play in 2008, with the first match against Albania (3:0, friendly game).
Same year, Montenegro played its first games in official competitions - against Georgia in 2009 European Volleyball Championship qualifiers.

== List of official matches ==
Montenengro played its first official match at May 2008. Below is a list of all official matches played by the national team since Montenegrin independence.
Win Loss

Date	Opponent	Score	Competition	Town	Attendance
08/05/2008	(Georgia (country)) Georgia	3:0	Euro 2009 qualifiers	Podgorica	1,000
11/05/2008	(Georgia (country)) Georgia	3:0	Euro 2009 qualifiers	Tbilisi	1,200
06/06/2008	Israel	0:3	Euro 2009 qualifiers	Netanya	700
07/06/2008	Turkey	0:3	Euro 2009 qualifiers	Netanya	100
08/06/2008	Greece	0:3	Euro 2009 qualifiers	Netanya	100
13/06/2008	Greece	1:3	Euro 2009 qualifiers	Giannitsa	800
14/06/2008	Turkey	0:3	Euro 2009 qualifiers	Giannitsa	200
15/06/2008	Israel	1:3	Euro 2009 qualifiers	Giannitsa	100
21/05/2010	Spain	0:3	Euro 2011 qualifiers	Osijek	300
22/05/2010	Switzerland	0:3	Euro 2011 qualifiers	Osijek	300
23/05/2010	Croatia	0:3	Euro 2011 qualifiers	Osijek	1,000
28/05/2010	Croatia	1:3	Euro 2011 qualifiers	Tres Cantos	300
29/05/2010	Spain	0:3	Euro 2011 qualifiers	Tres Cantos	1,000
30/05/2010	Switzerland	0:3	Euro 2011 qualifiers	Tres Cantos	200
07/09/2012	Belgium	0:3	Euro 2013 qualifiers	Maribor	100
08/09/2012	Slovenia	0:3	Euro 2013 qualifiers	Maribor	200
09/09/2012	France	0:3	Euro 2013 qualifiers	Maribor	100
14/09/2012	Slovenia	0:3	Euro 2013 qualifiers	Kortrijk	100
15/09/2012	Belgium	0:3	Euro 2013 qualifiers	Kortrijk	500
16/09/2012	France	0:3	Euro 2013 qualifiers	Kortrijk	200
24/05/2013	(North Macedonia) Macedonia	3:0	World Championship 2014 qualifiers	Herceg Novi	200
25/05/2013	Bosnia and Herzegovina	3:1	World Championship 2014 qualifiers	Herceg Novi	100
26/05/2013	Croatia	1:3	World Championship 2014 qualifiers	Herceg Novi	300
02/10/2013	Switzerland	0:3	World Championship 2014 qualifiers	Ra'anana	100
03/10/2013	Israel	0:3	World Championship 2014 qualifiers	Ra'anana	200
04/10/2013	Greece	2:3	World Championship 2014 qualifiers	Ra'anana	100
05/10/2013	Hungary	0:3	World Championship 2014 qualifiers	Ra'anana	100
05/10/2013	Latvia	2:3	World Championship 2014 qualifiers	Ra'anana	100
09/05/2014	Bosnia and Herzegovina	3:2	Euro 2015 qualifiers	Bar	700
10/05/2014	Estonia	3:0	Euro 2015 qualifiers	Bar	1,200
11/05/2014	Lithuania	3:0	Euro 2015 qualifiers	Bar	1,500
23/05/2014	Spain	3:1	Euro 2015 qualifiers	Coslada	1,100
24/05/2014	Czech Republic	0:3	Euro 2015 qualifiers	Coslada	100
25/05/2014	Slovenia	0:3	Euro 2015 qualifiers	Coslada	100
30/05/2014	Czech Republic	0:3	Euro 2015 qualifiers	Plzeň	100
31/05/2014	Spain	0:3	Euro 2015 qualifiers	Plzeň	200
01/06/2014	Slovenia	0:3	Euro 2015 qualifiers	Plzeň	200
02/06/2015	San Marino	3:0	Games of the Small States 2015	Reykjavík	400
03/06/2015	Luxembourg	3:0	Games of the Small States 2015	Reykjavík	300
04/06/2015	Iceland	3:0	Games of the Small States 2015	Reykjavík	600
06/06/2015	Liechtenstein	3:0	Games of the Small States 2015	Reykjavík	200
20/05/2016	Lithuania	3:1	Euro 2017 qualifiers	Alytus	150
21/05/2016	Bosnia and Herzegovina	2:3	Euro 2017 qualifiers	Alytus	100
22/05/2016	Norway	3:0	Euro 2017 qualifiers	Alytus	100
03/06/2016	Spain	3:0	European League 2016	Bar	1,000
04/06/2016	Azerbaijan	0:3	European League 2016	Bar	1,000
05/06/2016	France	3:2	European League 2016	Bar	1,000
10/06/2016	Azerbaijan	0:3	European League 2016	Rennes	200
11/06/2016	France	2:3	European League 2016	Rennes	700
12/06/2016	Spain	0:3	European League 2016	Rennes	200
16/09/2016	Romania	3:1	Euro 2017 qualifiers	Sofia	100
17/09/2016	Bulgaria	0:3	Euro 2017 qualifiers	Sofia	500
18/09/2016	Switzerland	2:3	Euro 2017 qualifiers	Sofia	200
22/09/2016	Bulgaria	1:3	Euro 2017 qualifiers	Piatra Neamț	100
23/09/2016	Romania	0:3	Euro 2017 qualifiers	Piatra Neamț	800
24/09/2016	Switzerland	3:1	Euro 2017 qualifiers	Piatra Neamț	100
31/05/2017	Romania	0:3	World Championship 2018 qualifiers	Sofia	100
01/06/2017	Kosovo	3:0	World Championship 2018 qualifiers	Sofia	100
02/06/2017	Bulgaria	0:3	World Championship 2018 qualifiers	Sofia	500
03/06/2017	Switzerland	0:3	World Championship 2018 qualifiers	Sofia	100
04/06/2017	Turkey	0:3	World Championship 2018 qualifiers	Sofia	200
16/06/2017	Ukraine	0:3	European League 2017	Tbilisi	120
17/06/2017	(Georgia (country)) Georgia	3:0	European League 2017	Tbilisi	300
18/06/2017	France	1:3	European League 2017	Tbilisi	100
23/06/2017	Ukraine	0:3	European League 2017	Rezé	200
24/06/2017	France	1:3	European League 2017	Rezé	1,100
25/06/2017	(Georgia (country)) Georgia	3:0	European League 2017	Rezé	100
25/08/2018	Greece	0:3	Euro 2019 qualifiers	Nea Ionia	500
19/08/2018	Ukraine	0:3	Euro 2019 qualifiers	Bar	800
22/08/2018	Norway	3:1	Euro 2019 qualifiers	Bar	300
25/08/2018	Norway	3:0	Euro 2019 qualifiers	Fredrikstad	500
05/01/2019	Ukraine	0:3	Euro 2019 qualifiers	Zaporizhia	1,200
09/01/2019	Greece	0:3	Euro 2019 qualifiers	Budva	400
28/05/2019	Liechtenstein	3:0	Games of the Small States 2019	Budva	200
29/05/2019	Cyprus	3:2	Games of the Small States 2019	Budva	300
30/05/2019	San Marino	3:0	Games of the Small States 2019	Budva	150
31/05/2019	Luxembourg	3:0	Games of the Small States 2019	Budva	200
01/06/2019	Iceland	3:0	Games of the Small States 2019	Budva	300
07/05/2021	Kosovo	3:0	Euro 2021 qualifiers	Podgorica	-
08/05/2021	Finland	2:3	Euro 2021 qualifiers	Podgorica	-
09/05/2021	Slovakia	0:3	Euro 2021 qualifiers	Podgorica	-
12/05/2021	Slovakia	0:3	Euro 2021 qualifiers	Nitra	-
13/05/2021	Finland	1:3	Euro 2021 qualifiers	Nitra	-
14/05/2021	Kosovo	3:1	Euro 2021 qualifiers	Nitra	-
21/08/2022	Finland	1:3	Euro 2023 qualifiers	Pljevlja	1,000
24/08/2022	Iceland	3:0	Euro 2023 qualifiers	Pljevlja	1,000
27/08/2022	Czech Republic	0:3	Euro 2023 qualifiers	Tabor	800
04/09/2022	Czech Republic	1:3	Euro 2023 qualifiers	Pljevlja	1,000
07/09/2022	Iceland	3:0	Euro 2023 qualifiers	Kópavogur	200
10/09/2022	Finland	1:3	Euro 2023 qualifiers	Joensuu	1,300
27/05/2023	Faroe Islands	3:0	European League 2023	Tórshavn	100
31/05/2023	Portugal	1:3	European League 2023	Santo Tirso	500
03/06/2023	(Georgia (country)) Georgia	3:0	European League 2023	Podgorica	800
10/06/2023	(Georgia (country)) Georgia	3:0	European League 2023	Tbilisi	1,500
14/06/2023	Portugal	3:0	European League 2023	Herceg Novi	600
16/06/2023	Faroe Islands	3:0	European League 2023	Herceg Novi	500
24/06/2023	Austria	1:3	European League 2023	Graz	1,000
25/06/2023	Portugal	1:3	European League 2023	Graz	200

Note: Montenegro scores first

== Montenegro vs. other countries ==
Below is the list of performances of Montenegro women's national volleyball team against every single opponent.

Opponents' country	G	W	L	S
Austria	1	0	1	1-3
Azerbaijan	2	0	2	0-6
Belgium	2	0	2	0-6
Bosnia and Herzegovina	3	2	1	8-6
Bulgaria	3	0	3	1-9
Croatia	3	0	3	2-9
Czech Republic	4	0	4	1-12
Cyprus	1	1	0	3-2
Estonia	1	1	0	3-0
Faroe Islands	2	2	0	6-0
Finland	4	0	4	5-12
France	6	1	5	7-17
Georgia	6	6	0	18-0
Greece	5	0	5	3-15
Hungary	1	0	1	0-3
Iceland	4	4	0	12-0
Israel	3	0	3	1-9
Kosovo	3	3	0	9-1
Lithuania	2	2	0	6-1
Latvia	1	0	1	2-3
Liechtenstein	2	2	0	6-0
Luxembourg	2	2	0	6-0
North Macedonia	1	1	0	3-0
Portugal	3	1	2	5-6
Romania	3	1	2	3-7
San Marino	2	2	0	6-0
Norway	3	3	0	9-1
Slovakia	2	0	2	0-6
Slovenia	5	0	5	0-15
Spain	6	2	4	6-13
Switzerland	6	1	5	5-16
Turkey	3	0	3	0-9
Ukraine	4	0	4	0-12
OVERALL	98	37	61	137-197

Last update: September 22, 2023.

== See also ==
- Montenegro women's national volleyball team
- Volleyball Federation of Montenegro (OSCG)
- Montenegrin women's volley league
