= 2019 Women's European Volleyball Championship qualification =

This article describes the qualification for the 2019 Women's European Volleyball Championship.

Hungary, Poland, Slovakia and Turkey as host nations were directly qualified. The eight best placed teams at the 2017 edition also gained direct entries into the tournament. 24 teams had registered for participation and compete for the remaining 12 places at the final tournament. The 24 teams were divided into six groups of four teams. The group winners and runners-up will advance to the final round.

== Qualified teams ==
Means of qualification	Qualifier	Means of qualification		Qualifier
Host Countries	Turkey	Qualification	Pool A	Belgium
Host Countries	Poland	Qualification	Pool A	Slovenia
Host Countries	Hungary	Qualification	Pool B	Croatia
Host Countries	Slovakia	Qualification	Pool B	Switzerland
2017 European Championship	Serbia	Qualification	Pool C	Greece
2017 European Championship	Netherlands	Qualification	Pool C	Ukraine
2017 European Championship	Azerbaijan	Qualification	Pool D	France
2017 European Championship	Italy	Qualification	Pool D	Portugal
2017 European Championship	Russia	Qualification	Pool E	Estonia
2017 European Championship	Belarus	Qualification	Pool E	Finland
2017 European Championship	Germany	Qualification	Pool F	Spain
2017 European Championship	Bulgaria	Qualification	Pool F	Romania
Total 24

== Direct qualification ==
2017 Women's European Volleyball Championship final standings

Qualified for 2019 Women's European Volleyball Championship
Qualified for 2019 Women's European Volleyball Championship as host countries

Rank	Team
1st place, gold medalist(s)	Serbia
2nd place, silver medalist(s)	Netherlands
3rd place, bronze medalist(s)	Turkey
4	Azerbaijan
5	Italy
6	Russia
7	Belarus
8	Germany
9	Bulgaria
10	Poland
11	Croatia
12	Czech Republic
13	Ukraine
14	Belgium
15	Hungary
16	Georgia
—	Slovakia

== Format ==
There being six pools of four teams each, the winners and runners-up of each pool will qualify for the 2019 Women’s EuroVolley. The groups will be played in a home and away round-robin format from August 2018 to January 2019. The pool composition results from the latest European Ranking for men’s and women’s national teams – as of September 4 and October 2, 2017, respectively – with teams being placed across the pools according to the serpentine system.

== Pool standing procedure ==
1. Number of matches won
2. Match points
3. Sets ratio
4. Points ratio
5. If the tie continues as per the point ratio between two teams, the priority will be given to the team which won the last match between them. When the tie in points ratio is between three or more teams, a new classification of these teams in the terms of points 1, 2 and 3 will be made taking into consideration only the matches in which they were opposed to each other.

Match won 3–0 or 3–1: 3 match points for the winner, 0 match points for the loser
Match won 3–2: 2 match points for the winner, 1 match point for the loser

== Results ==
- All times are local.

=== Pool A ===
Pos	Team	Pld	W	L	Pts	SW	SL	SR	SPW	SPL	SPR	Qualification
1	Belgium	6	6	0	18	18	0	MAX	450	233	1.931	2019 Women's European Volleyball Championship
2	Slovenia	6	4	2	12	12	6	2.000	416	348	1.195	2019 Women's European Volleyball Championship
3	Israel	6	2	4	6	6	12	0.500	344	398	0.864	
4	Iceland	6	0	6	0	0	18	0.000	219	450	0.487	

Date	Time		Score		Set 1	Set 2	Set 3	Set 4	Set 5	Total	Report
15 Aug	20:00	Slovenia	3–0	Israel	25–19	25–23	25–22			75–64	Report
15 Aug	20:30	Belgium	3–0	Iceland	25–4	25–8	25–10			75–22	Report
19 Aug	15:00	Iceland	0–3	Slovenia	18–25	16–25	13–25			47–75	Report
19 Aug	20:00	Israel	0–3	Belgium	11–25	6–25	11–25			28–75	Report
22 Aug	19:40	Israel	3–0	Iceland	25–19	25–20	25–18			75–57	Report
22 Aug	20:30	Belgium	3–0	Slovenia	25–23	25–16	25–21			75–60	Report
25 Aug	20:30	Slovenia	0–3	Belgium	17–25	16–25	23–25			56–75	Report
26 Aug	15:00	Iceland	0–3	Israel	11–25	12–25	18–25			41–75	Report
5 Jan	16:30	Slovenia	3–0	Iceland	25–12	25–11	25–12			75–35	Report
6 Jan	19:00	Belgium	3–0	Israel	25–23	25–13	25–14			75–50	Report
9 Jan	17:00	Iceland	0–3	Belgium	4–25	7–25	6–25			17–75	Report
9 Jan	20:00	Israel	0–3	Slovenia	17–25	12–25	23–25			52–75	Report

=== Pool B ===
Pos	Team	Pld	W	L	Pts	SW	SL	SR	SPW	SPL	SPR	Qualification
1	Croatia	6	6	0	18	18	2	9.000	493	365	1.351	2019 Women's European Volleyball Championship
2	Switzerland	6	3	3	10	12	10	1.200	481	459	1.048	2019 Women's European Volleyball Championship
3	Austria	6	3	3	8	11	11	1.000	475	463	1.026	
4	Albania	6	0	6	0	0	18	0.000	288	450	0.640	

Date	Time		Score		Set 1	Set 2	Set 3	Set 4	Set 5	Total	Report
15 Aug	17:45	Austria	1–3	Switzerland	25–19	13–25	11–25	18–25		67–94	Report
15 Aug	18:00	Croatia	3–0	Albania	25–20	25–14	25–17			75–51	Report
19 Aug	15:30	Switzerland	1–3	Croatia	25–22	23–25	21–25	13–25		82–97	Report
19 Aug	17:00	Albania	0–3	Austria	21–25	16–25	14–25			51–75	Report
22 Aug	17:30	Croatia	3–0	Austria	25–21	25–20	25–14			75–55	Report
22 Aug	19:30	Switzerland	3–0	Albania	25–19	25–23	25–14			75–56	Report
25 Aug	17:45	Austria	1–3	Croatia	25–21	23–25	21–25	21–25		90–96	Report
26 Aug	17:00	Albania	0–3	Switzerland	19–25	22–25	10–25			51–75	Report
5 Jan	16:00	Croatia	3–0	Switzerland	25–19	25–9	25–22			75–50	Report
5 Jan	17:45	Austria	3–0	Albania	25–13	25–9	25–20			75–42	Report
9 Jan	16:00	Albania	0–3	Croatia	15–25	8–25	14–25			37–75	Report
9 Jan	17:00	Switzerland	2–3	Austria	25–23	25–22	20–25	21–25	15–17	106–112	Report

=== Pool C ===
Pos	Team	Pld	W	L	Pts	SW	SL	SR	SPW	SPL	SPR	Qualification
1	Greece	6	6	0	18	18	0	MAX	450	324	1.389	2019 Women's European Volleyball Championship
2	Ukraine	6	4	2	12	12	7	1.714	430	388	1.108	2019 Women's European Volleyball Championship
3	Montenegro	6	2	4	6	6	13	0.462	379	437	0.867	
4	Norway	6	0	6	0	2	18	0.111	372	482	0.772	

Date	Time		Score		Set 1	Set 2	Set 3	Set 4	Set 5	Total	Report
15 Aug	16:00	Ukraine	3–0	Norway	25–16	25–10	25–19			75–45	Report
15 Aug	20:00	Greece	3–0	Montenegro	25–17	25–20	25–15			75–52	Report
18 Aug	15:00	Norway	0–3	Greece	20–25	19–25	16–25			55–75	Report
19 Aug	17:00	Montenegro	0–3	Ukraine	18–25	14–25	17–25			49–75	Report
22 Aug	16:00	Ukraine	0–3	Greece	18–25	19–25	19–25			56–75	Report
22 Aug	20:15	Montenegro	3–1	Norway	25–17	25–12	12–25	27–25		89–79	Report
25 Aug	18:00	Norway	0–3	Montenegro	15–25	22–25	21–25			58–75	Report
25 Aug	20:30	Greece	3–0	Ukraine	25–22	25–22	25–12			75–56	Report
5 Jan	17:00	Ukraine	3–0	Montenegro	25–22	25–21	25–21			75–64	Report
6 Jan	17:00	Greece	3–0	Norway	25–20	25–13	25–22			75–55	Report
9 Jan	17:00	Norway	1–3	Ukraine	22–25	25–18	22–25	11–25		80–93	Report
9 Jan	17:00	Montenegro	0–3	Greece	17–25	21–25	12–25			50–75	Report

=== Pool D ===
Pos	Team	Pld	W	L	Pts	SW	SL	SR	SPW	SPL	SPR	Qualification
1	France	6	6	0	18	18	1	18.000	477	357	1.336	2019 Women's European Volleyball Championship
2	Portugal	6	4	2	12	12	6	2.000	428	366	1.169	2019 Women's European Volleyball Championship
3	Georgia	6	1	5	4	5	16	0.313	387	489	0.791	
4	Denmark	6	1	5	2	5	17	0.294	433	513	0.844	

Date	Time		Score		Set 1	Set 2	Set 3	Set 4	Set 5	Total	Report
15 Aug	17:00	Georgia	0–3	Portugal	11–25	11–25	16–25			38–75	Report
15 Aug	18:00	France	3–0	Denmark	25–18	25–14	25–21			75–53	Report
18 Aug	16:00	Denmark	1–3	Georgia	25–21	17–25	18–25	23–25		83–96	Report
19 Aug	15:00	Portugal	0–3	France	24–26	18–25	12–25			54–76	Report
22 Aug	17:30	Portugal	3–0	Denmark	26–24	25–21	25–16			76–61	Report
22 Aug	20:00	France	3–0	Georgia	25–21	25–22	25–13			75–56	Report
25 Aug	16:00	Georgia	0–3	France	16–25	17–25	16–25			49–75	Report
25 Aug	17:00	Denmark	0–3	Portugal	14–25	23–25	21–25			58–75	Report
5 Jan	16:00	Georgia	2–3	Denmark	14–25	25–21	25–20	19–25	11–15	94–106	Report
5 Jan	20:00	France	3–0	Portugal	28–26	26–24	25–23			79–73	Report
9 Jan	17:00	Denmark	1–3	France	25–22	20–25	15–25	12–25		72–97	Report
9 Jan	20:00	Portugal	3–0	Georgia	25–19	25–23	25–12			75–54	Report

=== Pool E ===
Pos	Team	Pld	W	L	Pts	SW	SL	SR	SPW	SPL	SPR	Qualification
1	Estonia	6	4	2	12	14	11	1.273	536	531	1.009	2019 Women's European Volleyball Championship
2	Finland	6	4	2	11	15	11	1.364	549	525	1.046	2019 Women's European Volleyball Championship
3	Czech Republic	6	3	3	11	15	11	1.364	539	522	1.033	
4	Sweden	6	1	5	2	6	17	0.353	473	533	0.887	

Date	Time		Score		Set 1	Set 2	Set 3	Set 4	Set 5	Total	Report
15 Aug	18:00	Czech Republic	2–3	Sweden	25–19	22–25	25–15	20–25	7–15	99–99	Report
15 Aug	19:00	Estonia	2–3	Finland	25–15	25–20	23–25	20–25	7–15	100–100	Report
18 Aug	17:00	Finland	3–2	Czech Republic	19–25	25–15	21–25	25–23	15–8	105–96	Report
19 Aug	16:00	Sweden	1–3	Estonia	23–25	23–25	25–16	17–25		88–91	Report
22 Aug	17:00	Finland	3–1	Sweden	20–25	25–15	26–24	25–14		96–78	Report
22 Aug	18:00	Czech Republic	3–0	Estonia	25–23	25–12	25–19			75–54	Report
25 Aug	17:00	Sweden	0–3	Finland	14–25	25–27	19–25			58–77	Report
25 Aug	19:00	Estonia	3–2	Czech Republic	25–15	26–24	24–26	16–25	16–14	107–104	Report
5 Jan	19:15	Czech Republic	3–2	Finland	25–17	20–25	18–25	25–19	15–9	103–95	Report
6 Jan	16:00	Estonia	3–1	Sweden	19–25	25–23	25–17	25–23		94–88	Report
9 Jan	18:30	Finland	1–3	Estonia	20–25	25–15	14–25	17–25		76–90	Report
9 Jan	20:00	Sweden	0–3	Czech Republic	20–25	24–26	18–25			62–76	Report

=== Pool F ===
Pos	Team	Pld	W	L	Pts	SW	SL	SR	SPW	SPL	SPR	Qualification
1	Spain	6	5	1	14	15	6	2.500	507	432	1.174	2019 Women's European Volleyball Championship
2	Romania	6	4	2	13	16	8	2.000	536	469	1.143	2019 Women's European Volleyball Championship
3	Bosnia and Herzegovina	6	3	3	9	12	11	1.091	496	486	1.021	
4	Latvia	6	0	6	0	0	18	0.000	299	451	0.663	

Date	Time		Score		Set 1	Set 2	Set 3	Set 4	Set 5	Total	Report
15 Aug	17:00	Romania	2–3	Bosnia and Herzegovina	25–21	26–24	23–25	19–25	11–15	104–110	Report
15 Aug	19:30	Latvia	0–3	Spain	24–26	21–25	13–25			58–76	Report
18 Aug	19:00	Bosnia and Herzegovina	3–0	Latvia	25–8	25–16	25–16			75–40	Report
19 Aug	12:30	Spain	0–3	Romania	21–25	23–25	22–25			66–75	Report
22 Aug	18:00	Romania	3–0	Latvia	25–11	25–18	25–22			75–51	Report
22 Aug	18:00	Spain	3–0	Bosnia and Herzegovina	34–32	25–19	25–12			84–63	Report
26 Aug	18:00	Latvia	0–3	Romania	13–25	13–25	15–25			41–75	Report
26 Aug	20:30	Bosnia and Herzegovina	1–3	Spain	19–25	15–25	25–23	21–25		80–98	Report
5 Jan	18:00	Romania	2–3	Spain	25–22	16–25	23–25	25–21	13–15	102–108	Report
5 Jan	18:00	Latvia	0–3	Bosnia and Herzegovina	22–25	14–25	19–25			55–75	Report
9 Jan	17:00	Bosnia and Herzegovina	2–3	Romania	17–25	25–19	25–21	17–25	9–15	93–105	Report
9 Jan	19:30	Spain	3–0	Latvia	25–13	25–19	25–22			75–54	Report
