= 2015 Women's European Volleyball Championship qualification =

This is an article about qualification for the 2015 Women's European Volleyball Championship.

== Qualification summary ==
Qualified teams

- Hosts
  - Netherlands
  - Belgium
- Directly qualified after 2013 edition
  - Russia
  - Germany
  - Serbia
  - Croatia
  - Italy
- Qualified through qualification
  - Group A: Turkey
  - Group B: Poland
  - Group C: Czech Republic
  - Group D: Bulgaria
  - Group E: Hungary
  - Group F: Romania
  - Play-off 1: Slovenia
  - Play-off 2: Azerbaijan
  - Play-off 3: Belarus

== First round ==
First round was held from May 9, 2014 to May 11, 2014. The two group winners and two second place qualified directly for the second round.

| Group A | Group B |
|---|---|
| Host : Sweden Georgia; Latvia; Norway; Sweden | Host : Montenegro Bosnia and Herzegovina; Estonia; Lithuania; Montenegro |

- All times are local.

=== Pool A ===
The tournament was held at Halmstad Arena in Halmstad, Sweden.

| Pos | Team | Pld | W | L | Pts | SW | SL | SR | SPW | SPL | SPR | Qualification |
|---|---|---|---|---|---|---|---|---|---|---|---|---|
| 1 | Sweden | 3 | 3 | 0 | 9 | 9 | 3 | 3.000 | 288 | 231 | 1.247 | Second round |
| 2 | Latvia | 3 | 2 | 1 | 6 | 7 | 4 | 1.750 | 241 | 239 | 1.008 | Second round |
| 3 | Norway | 3 | 1 | 2 | 3 | 5 | 6 | 0.833 | 261 | 261 | 1.000 | Eliminated |
| 4 | Georgia | 3 | 0 | 3 | 0 | 1 | 9 | 0.111 | 195 | 254 | 0.768 | Eliminated |

| Date | Time | | Score | | Set 1 | Set 2 | Set 3 | Set 4 | Set 5 | Total | Report |
|---|---|---|---|---|---|---|---|---|---|---|---|
| 9 May | 17:00 | Norway | 1–3 | Latvia | 23–25 | 25–20 | 24–26 | 22–25 | | 94–96 | Report |
| 9 May | 20:00 | Georgia | 1–3 | Sweden | 25–19 | 26–28 | 11–25 | 14–25 | | 76–97 | Report |
| 10 May | 17:00 | Latvia | 1–3 | Sweden | 25–15 | 16–25 | 14–25 | 15–25 | | 70–90 | Report |
| 10 May | 20:00 | Norway | 3–0 | Georgia | 25–19 | 32–30 | 25–15 | | | 82–64 | Report |
| 11 May | 16:00 | Sweden | 3–1 | Norway | 25–22 | 25–10 | 21–25 | 30–28 | | 101–85 | Report |
| 11 May | 19:00 | Latvia | 3–0 | Georgia | 25–15 | 25–22 | 25–18 | | | 75–55 | Report |

=== Pool B ===
The tournament was held at Topolica Sport Hall in Bar, Montenegro.

| Pos | Team | Pld | W | L | Pts | SW | SL | SR | SPW | SPL | SPR | Qualification |
|---|---|---|---|---|---|---|---|---|---|---|---|---|
| 1 | Montenegro | 3 | 3 | 0 | 8 | 9 | 2 | 4.500 | 258 | 206 | 1.252 | Second round |
| 2 | Bosnia and Herzegovina | 3 | 2 | 1 | 6 | 8 | 6 | 1.333 | 292 | 297 | 0.983 | Second round |
| 3 | Lithuania | 4 | 1 | 3 | 4 | 5 | 7 | 0.714 | 251 | 264 | 0.951 | Eliminated |
| 4 | Estonia | 3 | 0 | 3 | 0 | 2 | 9 | 0.222 | 223 | 257 | 0.868 | Eliminated |

| Date | Time | | Score | | Set 1 | Set 2 | Set 3 | Set 4 | Set 5 | Total | Report |
|---|---|---|---|---|---|---|---|---|---|---|---|
| 9 May | 17:30 | Estonia | 1–3 | Lithuania | 16–25 | 21–25 | 25–19 | 19–25 | | 81–94 | Report |
| 9 May | 20:00 | Montenegro | 3–2 | Bosnia and Herzegovina | 22–25 | 25–14 | 25–22 | 21–25 | 15–10 | 108–96 | Report |
| 10 May | 17:30 | Lithuania | 2–3 | Bosnia and Herzegovina | 25–18 | 22–25 | 22–25 | 27–25 | 9–15 | 105–108 | Report |
| 10 May | 20:00 | Estonia | 0–3 | Montenegro | 16–25 | 22–25 | 20–25 | | | 58–75 | Report |
| 11 May | 18:30 | Bosnia and Herzegovina | 3–1 | Estonia | 25–17 | 25–23 | 13–25 | 25–19 | | 88–84 | Report |
| 11 May | 19:00 | Lithuania | 0–3 | Montenegro | 20–25 | 17–25 | 15–25 | | | 52–75 | Report |

== Second round ==
First round was held from May 16, 2014, to June 1, 2014.

- All times are local.

=== Group A ===
The tournament was held at Sk "Olimpiets" in Mogilev, Belarus and İzmir Atatürk Sport Hall, in İzmir, Turkey.

| Pos | Team | Pld | W | L | Pts | SW | SL | SR | SPW | SPL | SPR | Qualification |
|---|---|---|---|---|---|---|---|---|---|---|---|---|
| 1 | Turkey | 6 | 6 | 0 | 18 | 18 | 2 | 9.000 | 493 | 337 | 1.463 | Qualified to European Championship |
| 2 | Belarus | 6 | 3 | 3 | 9 | 11 | 9 | 1.222 | 441 | 394 | 1.119 | Third round |
| 3 | Finland | 6 | 3 | 3 | 9 | 10 | 10 | 1.000 | 423 | 435 | 0.972 | Eliminated |
| 4 | Denmark | 6 | 0 | 6 | 0 | 0 | 18 | 0.000 | 259 | 450 | 0.576 | Eliminated |

- Tournament 1 in Belarus

| Date | Time | | Score | | Set 1 | Set 2 | Set 3 | Set 4 | Set 5 | Total | Report |
|---|---|---|---|---|---|---|---|---|---|---|---|
| 23 May | 16:30 | Finland | 0–3 | Turkey | 15–25 | 12–25 | 14–25 | | | 41–75 | Report |
| 23 May | 19:00 | Belarus | 3–0 | Denmark | 25–8 | 25–12 | 25–14 | | | 75–34 | Report |
| 24 May | 16:30 | Turkey | 3–0 | Denmark | 25–15 | 25–16 | 25–23 | | | 75–54 | Report |
| 24 May | 19:00 | Finland | 3–1 | Belarus | 25–19 | 25–21 | 21–25 | 25–21 | | 96–86 | Report |
| 25 May | 16:30 | Denmark | 0–3 | Finland | 15–25 | 20–25 | 18–25 | | | 53–75 | Report |
| 25 May | 19:00 | Turkey | 3–1 | Belarus | 25–18 | 23–25 | 27–25 | 25–13 | | 100–81 | Report |

- Tournament 2 in Turkey

| Date | Time | | Score | | Set 1 | Set 2 | Set 3 | Set 4 | Set 5 | Total | Report |
|---|---|---|---|---|---|---|---|---|---|---|---|
| 30 May | 17:00 | Finland | 0–3 | Belarus | 22–25 | 15–25 | 21–25 | | | 58–75 | Report |
| 30 May | 19:30 | Turkey | 3–0 | Denmark | 25–10 | 25–9 | 25–15 | | | 75–34 | Report |
| 31 May | 17:00 | Belarus | 3–0 | Denmark | 25–17 | 25–8 | 25–6 | | | 75–31 | Report |
| 31 May | 19:30 | Finland | 1–3 | Turkey | 25–18 | 21–25 | 17–25 | 15–25 | | 78–93 | Report |
| 1 June | 17:00 | Denmark | 0–3 | Finland | 20–25 | 17–25 | 16–25 | | | 53–75 | Report |
| 1 June | 19:30 | Belarus | 0–3 | Turkey | 22–25 | 13–25 | 14–25 | | | 49–75 | Report |

=== Group B ===
The tournament was held at Pista Ghiaccio Resega in Lugano, Switzerland and Łuczniczka, in Bydgoszcz, Poland.

| Pos | Team | Pld | W | L | Pts | SW | SL | SR | SPW | SPL | SPR | Qualification |
|---|---|---|---|---|---|---|---|---|---|---|---|---|
| 1 | Poland | 6 | 6 | 0 | 17 | 18 | 2 | 9.000 | 482 | 336 | 1.435 | Qualified to European Championship |
| 2 | Ukraine | 6 | 3 | 3 | 10 | 12 | 9 | 1.333 | 471 | 417 | 1.129 | Third round |
| 3 | Switzerland | 6 | 3 | 3 | 9 | 9 | 11 | 0.818 | 389 | 438 | 0.888 | Eliminated |
| 4 | Latvia | 6 | 0 | 6 | 0 | 1 | 18 | 0.056 | 319 | 470 | 0.679 | Eliminated |

- Tournament 1 in Switzerland

| Date | Time | | Score | | Set 1 | Set 2 | Set 3 | Set 4 | Set 5 | Total | Report |
|---|---|---|---|---|---|---|---|---|---|---|---|
| 16 May | 18:00 | Latvia | 0–3 | Ukraine | 15–25 | 21–25 | 24–26 | | | 60–76 | Report |
| 16 May | 21:00 | Switzerland | 0–3 | Poland | 16–25 | 13–25 | 18–25 | | | 47–75 | Report |
| 17 May | 16:00 | Ukraine | 2–3 | Poland | 27–25 | 25–17 | 21–25 | 19–25 | 10–15 | 102–107 | Report |
| 17 May | 19:00 | Latvia | 1–3 | Switzerland | 22–25 | 16–25 | 25–16 | 12–25 | | 75–91 | Report |
| 18 May | 16:00 | Poland | 3–0 | Latvia | 25–20 | 25–6 | 25–20 | | | 75–46 | Report |
| 18 May | 19:00 | Ukraine | 3–0 | Switzerland | 25–13 | 25–15 | 25–9 | | | 75–37 | Report |

- Tournament 2 in Poland

| Date | Time | | Score | | Set 1 | Set 2 | Set 3 | Set 4 | Set 5 | Total | Report |
|---|---|---|---|---|---|---|---|---|---|---|---|
| 23 May | 17:30 | Switzerland | 3–1 | Ukraine | 19–25 | 25–15 | 25–23 | 25–19 | | 94–82 | Report |
| 23 May | 20:00 | Poland | 3–0 | Latvia | 25–12 | 25–15 | 25–11 | | | 75–38 | Report |
| 24 May | 15:00 | Ukraine | 3–0 | Latvia | 25–12 | 25–13 | 25–19 | | | 75–44 | Report |
| 24 May | 18:00 | Switzerland | 0–3 | Poland | 10–25 | 12–25 | 20–25 | | | 42–75 | Report |
| 25 May | 17:30 | Latvia | 0–3 | Switzerland | 12–25 | 26–28 | 18–25 | | | 56–78 | Report |
| 25 May | 20:00 | Ukraine | 0–3 | Poland | 16–25 | 23–25 | 22–25 | | | 61–75 | Report |

=== Group C ===
The tournament was held at Pabellón deportivo "El Plantío" in Coslada, Spain and Městská sportovní hala, in Plzeň, Czech Republic.

| Pos | Team | Pld | W | L | Pts | SW | SL | SR | SPW | SPL | SPR | Qualification |
|---|---|---|---|---|---|---|---|---|---|---|---|---|
| 1 | Czech Republic | 6 | 6 | 0 | 17 | 18 | 3 | 6.000 | 508 | 379 | 1.340 | Qualified to European Championship |
| 2 | Slovenia | 6 | 4 | 2 | 12 | 13 | 7 | 1.857 | 449 | 408 | 1.100 | Third round |
| 3 | Spain | 6 | 1 | 5 | 4 | 7 | 15 | 0.467 | 442 | 509 | 0.868 | Eliminated |
| 4 | Montenegro | 6 | 1 | 5 | 3 | 3 | 16 | 0.188 | 361 | 464 | 0.778 | Eliminated |

- Tournament 1 in Spain

| Date | Time | | Score | | Set 1 | Set 2 | Set 3 | Set 4 | Set 5 | Total | Report |
|---|---|---|---|---|---|---|---|---|---|---|---|
| 23 May | 17:00 | Slovenia | 1–3 | Czech Republic | 14–25 | 11–25 | 25–22 | 19–25 | | 69–97 | Report |
| 23 May | 19:30 | Spain | 1–3 | Montenegro | 19–25 | 22–25 | 25–18 | 18–25 | | 84–93 | Report |
| 24 May | 15:00 | Czech Republic | 3–0 | Montenegro | 25–14 | 25–20 | 25–21 | | | 75–55 | Report |
| 24 May | 17:30 | Slovenia | 3–0 | Spain | 25–18 | 25–15 | 25–20 | | | 75–53 | Report |
| 25 May | 15:00 | Montenegro | 0–3 | Slovenia | 13–25 | 23–25 | 21–25 | | | 57–75 | Report |
| 25 May | 17:30 | Czech Republic | 3–0 | Spain | 25–15 | 25–18 | 25–19 | | | 75–52 | Report |

- Tournament 2 in Czech Republic

| Date | Time | | Score | | Set 1 | Set 2 | Set 3 | Set 4 | Set 5 | Total | Report |
|---|---|---|---|---|---|---|---|---|---|---|---|
| 30 May | 15:00 | Slovenia | 3–1 | Spain | 25–9 | 25–15 | 20–25 | 26–24 | | 96–73 | Report |
| 30 May | 18:00 | Czech Republic | 3–0 | Montenegro | 25–12 | 25–15 | 25–17 | | | 75–44 | Report |
| 31 May | 15:00 | Spain | 3–0 | Montenegro | 25–16 | 25–15 | 30–28 | | | 80–59 | Report |
| 31 May | 18:00 | Slovenia | 0–3 | Czech Republic | 23–25 | 19–25 | 17–25 | | | 59–75 | Report |
| 1 June | 15:00 | Montenegro | 0–3 | Slovenia | 17–25 | 15–25 | 21–25 | | | 53–75 | Report |
| 1 June | 18:00 | Spain | 2–3 | Czech Republic | 15–25 | 23–25 | 25–23 | 25–23 | 12–15 | 100–111 | Report |

=== Group D ===
The tournament was held at "Hristo Botev" Sport Hall in Sofia, Bulgaria and A.Y.S. Sport Hall, in Baku, Azerbaijan.

| Pos | Team | Pld | W | L | Pts | SW | SL | SR | SPW | SPL | SPR | Qualification |
|---|---|---|---|---|---|---|---|---|---|---|---|---|
| 1 | Bulgaria | 6 | 5 | 1 | 16 | 17 | 5 | 3.400 | 509 | 390 | 1.305 | Qualified to European Championship |
| 2 | Azerbaijan | 6 | 4 | 2 | 12 | 15 | 10 | 1.500 | 557 | 520 | 1.071 | Third round |
| 3 | Portugal | 6 | 2 | 4 | 4 | 8 | 16 | 0.500 | 477 | 562 | 0.849 | Eliminated |
| 4 | Greece | 6 | 1 | 5 | 4 | 7 | 16 | 0.438 | 456 | 527 | 0.865 | Eliminated |

- Tournament 1 in Bulgaria

| Date | Time | | Score | | Set 1 | Set 2 | Set 3 | Set 4 | Set 5 | Total | Report |
|---|---|---|---|---|---|---|---|---|---|---|---|
| 22 May | 15:30 | Portugal | 3–2 | Azerbaijan | 25–23 | 16–25 | 23–25 | 25–23 | 15–12 | 104–108 | Report |
| 22 May | 18:00 | Bulgaria | 3–0 | Greece | 25–13 | 25–14 | 25–13 | | | 75–40 | Report |
| 23 May | 15:30 | Azerbaijan | 3–1 | Greece | 25–14 | 30–28 | 17–25 | 25–21 | | 97–88 | Report |
| 23 May | 18:00 | Portugal | 0–3 | Bulgaria | 14–25 | 18–25 | 21–25 | | | 53–75 | Report |
| 24 May | 15:30 | Greece | 3–1 | Portugal | 25–17 | 21–25 | 25–15 | 25–19 | | 96–76 | Report |
| 24 May | 18:30 | Azerbaijan | 3–2 | Bulgaria | 17–25 | 25–22 | 19–25 | 25–20 | 15–8 | 101–100 | Report |

- Tournament 2 in Azerbaijan

| Date | Time | | Score | | Set 1 | Set 2 | Set 3 | Set 4 | Set 5 | Total | Report |
|---|---|---|---|---|---|---|---|---|---|---|---|
| 29 May | 16:00 | Portugal | 0–3 | Bulgaria | 17–25 | 17–25 | 19–25 | | | 53–75 | Report |
| 29 May | 18:30 | Azerbaijan | 3–0 | Greece | 25–18 | 25–21 | 25–18 | | | 75–57 | Report |
| 30 May | 16:00 | Bulgaria | 3–1 | Greece | 25–9 | 20–25 | 25–21 | 25–12 | | 95–67 | Report |
| 30 May | 18:30 | Portugal | 1–3 | Azerbaijan | 27–25 | 23–25 | 18–25 | 14–25 | | 82–100 | Report |
| 31 May | 16:00 | Greece | 2–3 | Portugal | 24–26 | 21–25 | 25–22 | 25–21 | 13–15 | 108–109 | Report |
| 31 May | 18:30 | Bulgaria | 3–1 | Azerbaijan | 25–14 | 25–18 | 14–25 | 25–19 | | 89–76 | Report |

=== Group E ===
The tournament was held at Palais des Sports in Moulins, France and Hesegi Sport Hall - Wingate Institute, in Netanya, Israel.

| Pos | Team | Pld | W | L | Pts | SW | SL | SR | SPW | SPL | SPR | Qualification |
|---|---|---|---|---|---|---|---|---|---|---|---|---|
| 1 | Hungary | 6 | 4 | 2 | 12 | 14 | 8 | 1.750 | 511 | 458 | 1.116 | Qualified to European Championship |
| 2 | France | 6 | 4 | 2 | 12 | 12 | 7 | 1.714 | 439 | 399 | 1.100 | Third round |
| 3 | Israel | 6 | 4 | 2 | 12 | 13 | 9 | 1.444 | 478 | 473 | 1.011 | Eliminated |
| 4 | Sweden | 6 | 0 | 6 | 0 | 3 | 18 | 0.167 | 406 | 504 | 0.806 | Eliminated |

- Tournament 1 in France

| Date | Time | | Score | | Set 1 | Set 2 | Set 3 | Set 4 | Set 5 | Total | Report |
|---|---|---|---|---|---|---|---|---|---|---|---|
| 23 May | 17:00 | Hungary | 3–1 | Israel | 25–21 | 17–25 | 25–17 | 25–18 | | 92–81 | Report |
| 23 May | 20:00 | France | 3–0 | Sweden | 25–21 | 25–10 | 25–23 | | | 75–54 | Report |
| 24 May | 17:00 | Israel | 3–0 | France | 25–23 | 25–15 | 26–24 | | | 76–62 | Report |
| 24 May | 20:00 | Sweden | 1–3 | Hungary | 17–25 | 19–25 | 27–25 | 19–25 | | 82–100 | Report |
| 25 May | 15:00 | Israel | 3–1 | Sweden | 25–21 | 12–25 | 25–17 | 25–15 | | 87–78 | Report |
| 25 May | 18:00 | France | 0–3 | Hungary | 22–25 | 21–25 | 15–25 | | | 58–75 | Report |

- Tournament 2 in Israel

| Date | Time | | Score | | Set 1 | Set 2 | Set 3 | Set 4 | Set 5 | Total | Report |
|---|---|---|---|---|---|---|---|---|---|---|---|
| 30 May | 17:00 | Israel | 3–1 | Sweden | 17–25 | 25–23 | 25–23 | 25–18 | | 92–89 | Report |
| 30 May | 19:30 | Hungary | 1–3 | France | 20–25 | 25–27 | 25–17 | 22–25 | | 92–94 | Report |
| 31 May | 17:00 | Sweden | 0–3 | France | 14–25 | 22–25 | 14–25 | | | 50–75 | Report |
| 31 May | 19:30 | Israel | 3–1 | Hungary | 26–24 | 14–25 | 25–11 | 25–17 | | 90–77 | Report |
| 1 June | 17:00 | Sweden | 0–3 | Hungary | 15–25 | 18–25 | 20–25 | | | 53–75 | Report |
| 1 June | 19:30 | France | 3–0 | Israel | 25–20 | 25–10 | 25–22 | | | 75–52 | Report |

=== Group F ===
The tournament was held at Budocenter in Wien, Austria and Polyvalent Hall, in Piatra Neamţ, Romania.

| Pos | Team | Pld | W | L | Pts | SW | SL | SR | SPW | SPL | SPR | Qualification |
|---|---|---|---|---|---|---|---|---|---|---|---|---|
| 1 | Romania | 6 | 6 | 0 | 18 | 18 | 1 | 18.000 | 480 | 325 | 1.477 | Qualified to European Championship |
| 2 | Slovakia | 6 | 4 | 2 | 12 | 12 | 7 | 1.714 | 432 | 402 | 1.075 | Third round |
| 3 | Austria | 6 | 2 | 4 | 4 | 6 | 16 | 0.375 | 437 | 512 | 0.854 | Eliminated |
| 4 | Bosnia and Herzegovina | 6 | 0 | 6 | 2 | 6 | 18 | 0.333 | 459 | 569 | 0.807 | Eliminated |

- Tournament 1 in Austria

| Date | Time | | Score | | Set 1 | Set 2 | Set 3 | Set 4 | Set 5 | Total | Report |
|---|---|---|---|---|---|---|---|---|---|---|---|
| 21 May | 19:00 | Romania | 3–1 | Bosnia and Herzegovina | 23–25 | 25–18 | 25–23 | 25–18 | | 98–84 | Report |
| 21 May | 21:15 | Austria | 0–3 | Slovakia | 23–25 | 16–25 | 17–25 | | | 56–75 | Report |
| 22 May | 19:00 | Bosnia and Herzegovina | 2–3 | Austria | 26–28 | 25–21 | 25–22 | 18–25 | 14–16 | 108–112 | Report |
| 22 May | 21:15 | Slovakia | 0–3 | Romania | 14–25 | 21–25 | 21–25 | | | 56–75 | Report |
| 23 May | 18:00 | Austria | 0–3 | Romania | 17–25 | 30–32 | 14–25 | | | 61–82 | Report |
| 23 May | 20:15 | Bosnia and Herzegovina | 0–3 | Slovakia | 16–25 | 22–25 | 14–25 | | | 52–75 | Report |

- Tournament 2 in Romania

| Date | Time | | Score | | Set 1 | Set 2 | Set 3 | Set 4 | Set 5 | Total | Report |
|---|---|---|---|---|---|---|---|---|---|---|---|
| 30 May | 16:00 | Bosnia and Herzegovina | 2–3 | Austria | 25–23 | 23–25 | 25–23 | 12–25 | 11–15 | 96–111 | Report |
| 30 May | 18:30 | Romania | 3–0 | Slovakia | 25–19 | 25–19 | 25–14 | | | 75–52 | Report |
| 31 May | 16:00 | Austria | 0–3 | Slovakia | 24–26 | 16–25 | 23–25 | | | 63–76 | Report |
| 31 May | 18:30 | Bosnia and Herzegovina | 0–3 | Romania | 8–25 | 16–25 | 14–25 | | | 38–75 | Report |
| 1 June | 16:00 | Slovakia | 3–1 | Bosnia and Herzegovina | 23–25 | 25–19 | 25–19 | 25–18 | | 98–81 | Report |
| 1 June | 18:30 | Austria | 0–3 | Romania | 5–25 | 20–25 | 9–25 | | | 34–75 | Report |

== Third round ==
First round was held from May 23, 2015, to May 30, 2015. The 2nd placed teams of the Second Round will play one home and one away match to determine the 3 winners who will then subsequently be qualified through to the 2015 Championship.

- All times are local.

| Team 1 | Agg. | Team 2 | 1st leg | 2nd leg |
|---|---|---|---|---|
| Slovenia | 6–0 | France | 3–1 | 3–1 |
| Azerbaijan | 3–3^{1} | Slovakia | 3–0 | 0–3 |
| Belarus | 4–2 | Ukraine | 3–0 | 2–3 |

- ^{1} Azerbaijan won the golden set 15–6

=== First leg ===
| Date | Time | | Score | | Set 1 | Set 2 | Set 3 | Set 4 | Set 5 | Total | Report |
|---|---|---|---|---|---|---|---|---|---|---|---|
| 23 May | 18:00 | Azerbaijan | 3–0 | Slovakia | 25–22 | 25–18 | 25–23 | | | 75–63 | Report |
| 23 May | 16:00 | France | 1–3 | Slovenia | 25–17 | 27–29 | 21–25 | 19–25 | | 92–96 | Report |
| 23 May | 19:00 | Ukraine | 0–3 | Belarus | 19–25 | 20–25 | 16–25 | | | 55–75 | Report |

=== Second leg ===
| Date | Time | | Score | | Set 1 | Set 2 | Set 3 | Set 4 | Set 5 | Total | Report |
|---|---|---|---|---|---|---|---|---|---|---|---|
| 24 May | 18:00 | Belarus | 2–3 | Ukraine | 26–28 | 21–25 | 25–20 | 25–11 | 14–16 | 111–100 | Report |
| 29 May | 17:00 | Slovenia | 3–1 | France | 25–16 | 26–28 | 25–21 | 25–22 | | 101–87 | Report |
| 30 May | 18:00 | Slovakia | 3–0 | Azerbaijan | 26–24 | 25–19 | 25–18 | | | 76–61 | Report |
