= 2021 Women's European Volleyball Championship qualification =

This article describes the qualification for the 2021 Women's European Volleyball Championship.

Qualifying matches were initially scheduled in August and September 2020 but due to COVID-19 pandemic CEV decided to postpone the matches. On 29 June 2020, CEV released a tentative schedule moving the matches to January 2021.

In December 2020 as a response to the coronavirus crisis and the many restrictions in place in many countries for teams to travel and organisers to host and deliver sporting events, the CEV Board of Administration has decided to postpone the completion of the CEV EuroVolley 2021 qualifiers to 16 May 2021 at the latest.

== Qualification ==
Serbia, Bulgaria, Croatia and Romania as host countries were directly qualified. The eight best placed teams at the 2019 edition also gained direct entries into the tournament. 23 teams compete for the remaining 12 places at the final tournament.

Means of qualification	Qualifier	Means of qualification		Qualifier
Host Countries	Serbia	Qualification	Pool A	Belarus
Host Countries	Bulgaria	Qualification	Pool A	Switzerland
Host Countries	Croatia	Qualification	Pool B	Sweden
Host Countries	Romania	Qualification	Pool B	Ukraine
2019 European Championship	Turkey	Qualification	Pool C	Greece
2019 European Championship	Italy	Qualification	Pool C	Spain
2019 European Championship	Poland	Qualification	Pool D	Slovakia
2019 European Championship	Netherlands	Qualification	Pool D	Finland
2019 European Championship	Germany	Qualification	Pool E	France
2019 European Championship	Russia	Qualification	Pool E	Hungary
2019 European Championship	Belgium	Qualification	Pool F	Czech Republic
2019 European Championship	Azerbaijan	Qualification	Pool F	Bosnia and Herzegovina
Total 24

== Direct qualification ==
- 2019 Women's European Volleyball Championship final standing

Qualified for the 2021 European Championship
Qualified as hosts for the 2021 European Championship

Rank	Team
1st place, gold medalist(s)	Serbia
2nd place, silver medalist(s)	Turkey
3rd place, bronze medalist(s)	Italy
4	Poland
5	Netherlands
6	Germany
7	Russia
8	Bulgaria
9	Belgium
10	Azerbaijan
11	Croatia
12	Slovakia
13	Romania
14	Greece
15	Spain
16	Slovenia
17	Ukraine
18	Finland
19	Switzerland
20	Hungary
21	France
22	Belarus
23	Estonia
24	Portugal

== Format ==
There being six pools of either three or four teams each, the top two of each pool will qualify for the 2021 European Championship. The pools will be played in a double round-robin tournaments format officially from 7 to 16 May 2021.

== Pools composition ==
The pools were set following the serpentine system according to their European Ranking for national teams as of January 2020. Due to travel restrictions in place for citizens of Kosovo, their team has been moved to the next available pool where no such restrictions would apply. Rankings are shown in brackets.

Pool A	Pool B	Pool C	Pool D	Pool E	Pool F
Belarus (11)	Ukraine (13)	Spain (14)	Slovakia (15)	Hungary (17)	Slovenia (18)
Switzerland (24)	Portugal (23)	Greece (22)	Finland (21)	France (20)	Czech Republic (19)
Estonia (25)	Georgia (26)	Austria (27)	Montenegro (28)	Israel (29)	Bosnia and Herzegovina (30)
	Sweden (34)	Norway (32)	Kosovo (40)	Denmark (32)	Latvia (30)

== Pool standing procedure ==
1. Number of matches won
2. Match points
3. Sets ratio
4. Points ratio
5. If the tie continues as per the point ratio between two teams, the priority will be given to the team which won the last match between them. When the tie in points ratio is between three or more teams, a new classification of these teams in the terms of points 1, 2 and 3 will be made taking into consideration only the matches in which they were opposed to each other.

Match won 3–0 or 3–1: 3 match points for the winner, 0 match points for the loser
Match won 3–2: 2 match points for the winner, 1 match point for the loser

== Results ==
=== Pool A ===
Pos	Team	Pld	W	L	Pts	SW	SL	SR	SPW	SPL	SPR	Qualification
1	Belarus	4	4	0	12	12	1	12.000	322	260	1.238	2021 Women's European Volleyball Championship
2	Switzerland	4	2	2	5	7	9	0.778	339	345	0.983	2021 Women's European Volleyball Championship
3	Estonia	4	0	4	1	3	12	0.250	303	359	0.844	

- Venue: Čyžoŭka-Arena, Team Sports Hall, Minsk, Belarus

Date	Time		Score		Set 1	Set 2	Set 3	Set 4	Set 5	Total	Report
10 May	18:00	Belarus	3–0	Estonia	25–23	25–20	25–18			75–61	Report
11 May	18:00	Estonia	2–3	Switzerland	25–18	19–25	15–25	25–23	14–16	98–107	Report
12 May	18:00	Switzerland	1–3	Belarus	22–25	16–25	25–18	20–25		83–93	Report
13 May	18:00	Estonia	0–3	Belarus	22–25	27–29	16–25			65–79	Report
14 May	18:00	Switzerland	3–1	Estonia	25–15	23–25	25–17	25–22		98–79	Report
15 May	18:00	Belarus	3–0	Switzerland	25–20	25–12	25–19			75–51	Report

=== Pool B ===
Pos	Team	Pld	W	L	Pts	SW	SL	SR	SPW	SPL	SPR	Qualification
1	Sweden	6	5	1	14	16	6	2.667	507	377	1.345	2021 Women's European Volleyball Championship
2	Ukraine	6	4	2	13	14	7	2.000	484	337	1.436	2021 Women's European Volleyball Championship
3	Portugal	6	3	3	9	11	10	1.100	452	402	1.124	
4	Georgia	6	0	6	0	0	18	0.000	123	450	0.273	

Tournament 1

- Venue: Centro de Deportos e Congressos de Matosinhos, Matosinhos, Portugal

Date	Time		Score		Set 1	Set 2	Set 3	Set 4	Set 5	Total	Report
7 May	19.00	Portugal	1–3	Ukraine	25–20	21–25	23–25	19–25		88–95	Report
7 May	00.00	Georgia	0–3	Sweden	0–25	0–25	0–25			0–75	Report
8 May	15.00	Sweden	3–0	Ukraine	27–25	25–19	25–18			77–62	Report
8 May	00.00	Georgia	0–3	Portugal	0–25	0–25	0–25			0–75	Report
9 May	00.00	Ukraine	3–0	Georgia	25–0	25–0	25–0			75–0	Report
9 May	15.00	Sweden	3–1	Portugal	25–21	25–16	19–25	25–15		94–77	Report

Tournament 2

- Venue: New Volleyball Arena, Tbilisi, Georgia

Date	Time		Score		Set 1	Set 2	Set 3	Set 4	Set 5	Total	Report
14 May	15.30	Georgia	0–3	Portugal	19–25	15–25	16–25			50–75	Report
14 May	18.30	Sweden	3–2	Ukraine	15–25	25–18	25–23	18–25	15–11	98–102	Report
15 May	15.30	Portugal	0–3	Ukraine	14–25	13–25	13–25			40–75	Report
15 May	18.30	Georgia	0–3	Sweden	16–25	13–25	10–25			39–75	Report
16 May	15.30	Ukraine	3–0	Georgia	25–6	25–19	25–9			75–34	Report
16 May	18.30	Portugal	3–1	Sweden	25–23	22–25	25–18	25–22		97–88	Report

=== Pool C ===
Pos	Team	Pld	W	L	Pts	SW	SL	SR	SPW	SPL	SPR	Qualification
1	Greece	6	6	0	18	18	0	MAX	450	253	1.779	2021 Women's European Volleyball Championship
2	Spain	6	4	2	12	12	7	1.714	441	347	1.271	2021 Women's European Volleyball Championship
3	Austria	6	2	4	6	7	12	0.583	393	374	1.051	
4	Norway	6	0	6	0	0	18	0.000	140	450	0.311	

Tournament 1

- Venue: Larissa Neapolis Indoor Arena, Larissa, Greece

Date	Time		Score		Set 1	Set 2	Set 3	Set 4	Set 5	Total	Report
7 May	17.00	Spain	3–1	Austria	28–26	25–18	23–25	25–23		101–92	Report
7 May	20.00	Greece	3–0	Norway	25–18	25–12	25–17			75–47	Report
8 May	17.00	Austria	3–0	Norway	25–16	25–18	25–14			75–48	Report
8 May	20.00	Spain	0–3	Greece	22–25	20–25	18–25			60–75	Report
9 May	17.00	Norway	0–3	Spain	17–25	15–25	13–25			45–75	Report
9 May	20.00	Austria	0–3	Greece	14–25	8–25	18–25			40–75	Report

Tournament 2

- Venue: Raiffeisen Sportpark, Graz, Austria

Date	Time		Score		Set 1	Set 2	Set 3	Set 4	Set 5	Total	Report
13 May	17.35	Austria	0–3	Spain	17–25	21–25	22–25			60–75	Report
13 May	00.00	Norway	0–3	Greece	0–25	0–25	0–25			0–75	Report
14 May	17.35	Spain	0–3	Greece	19–25	15–25	21–25			55–75	Report
14 May	00.00	Norway	0–3	Austria	0–25	0–25	0–25			0–75	Report
15 May	00.00	Spain	3–0	Norway	25–0	25–0	25–0			75–0	Report
15 May	20.20	Greece	3–0	Austria	25–16	25–18	25–17			75–51	Report

=== Pool D ===
Pos	Team	Pld	W	L	Pts	SW	SL	SR	SPW	SPL	SPR	Qualification
1	Slovakia	6	6	0	18	18	1	18.000	473	290	1.631	2021 Women's European Volleyball Championship
2	Finland	6	4	2	11	13	9	1.444	440	441	0.998	2021 Women's European Volleyball Championship
3	Montenegro	6	2	4	7	9	13	0.692	463	496	0.933	
4	Kosovo	6	0	6	0	1	18	0.056	316	465	0.680	

Tournament 1

- Venue: SC Verde Hall, Podgorica, Montenegro
- All times are Central European Summer Time (UTC+02:00).

Date	Time		Score		Set 1	Set 2	Set 3	Set 4	Set 5	Total	Report
7 May	17.00	Finland	1–3	Slovakia	24–26	25–22	14–25	19–25		82–98	Report
7 May	20.00	Montenegro	3–0	Kosovo	25–21	25–14	26–24			76–59	Report
8 May	17.00	Slovakia	3–0	Kosovo	25–15	25–17	25–16			75–48	Report
8 May	20.00	Finland	3–2	Montenegro	24–26	25–23	25–17	22–25	15–13	111–104	Report
9 May	17.00	Kosovo	0–3	Finland	15–25	10–25	15–25			40–75	Report
9 May	20.00	Slovakia	3–0	Montenegro	25–22	25–17	25–23			75–62	Report

Tournament 2

- Venue: Nitra City Hall, Nitra, Slovakia
- All times are Central European Summer Time (UTC+02:00).

Date	Time		Score		Set 1	Set 2	Set 3	Set 4	Set 5	Total	Report
13 May	17.30	Slovakia	3–0	Montenegro	25–14	25–10	25–23			75–47	Report
13 May	20.30	Kosovo	0–3	Finland	9–25	16–25	14–25			39–75	Report
14 May	17.30	Montenegro	1–3	Finland	25–22	22–25	16–25	22–25		85–97	Report
14 May	20.30	Slovakia	3–0	Kosovo	25–23	25–11	25–17			75–51	Report
15 May	17.30	Montenegro	3–1	Kosovo	25–19	14–25	25–21	25–14		89–79	Report
15 May	20.30	Finland	0–3	Slovakia	0–25	0–25	0–25			0–75	Report

=== Pool E ===
Pos	Team	Pld	W	L	Pts	SW	SL	SR	SPW	SPL	SPR	Qualification
1	France	6	5	1	15	17	5	3.400	525	413	1.271	2021 Women's European Volleyball Championship
2	Hungary	6	5	1	15	17	5	3.400	509	410	1.241	2021 Women's European Volleyball Championship
3	Israel	6	2	4	5	6	14	0.429	367	454	0.808	
4	Denmark	6	0	6	1	2	18	0.111	354	478	0.741	

Tournament 1

- Venue: Le Phare, Belfort, France

Date	Time		Score		Set 1	Set 2	Set 3	Set 4	Set 5	Total	Report
7 May	17.00	Israel	0–3	Hungary	18–25	14–25	12–25			44–75	Report
7 May	20.00	Denmark	0–3	France	18–25	15–25	16–25			49–75	Report
8 May	17.00	France	2–3	Hungary	24–26	25–14	25–19	23–25	12–15	109–99	Report
8 May	20.00	Denmark	0–3	Israel	19–25	16–25	16–25			51–75	Report
9 May	16.30	France	3–0	Israel	25–16	25–19	25–14			75–49	Report
9 May	19.30	Hungary	3–0	Denmark	25–18	25–20	25–13			75–51	Report

Tournament 2

- Venue: Ludovika Arena, Budapest, Hungary

Date	Time		Score		Set 1	Set 2	Set 3	Set 4	Set 5	Total	Report
14 May	16.00	Denmark	0–3	France	21–25	23–25	17–25			61–75	Report
14 May	19.00	Hungary	3–0	Israel	25–19	25–16	25–16			75–51	Report
15 May	16.00	France	3–0	Israel	25–19	25–14	25–12			75–45	Report
15 May	19.00	Denmark	0–3	Hungary	8–25	18–25	13–25			39–75	Report
16 May	16.00	France	3–2	Hungary	25–23	21–25	30–32	25–19	15–11	116–110	Report
16 May	19.00	Israel	3–2	Denmark	26–24	25–14	18–25	17–25	17–15	103–103	Report

=== Pool F ===
Pos	Team	Pld	W	L	Pts	SW	SL	SR	SPW	SPL	SPR	Qualification
1	Czech Republic	6	6	0	18	18	2	9.000	491	372	1.320	2021 Women's European Volleyball Championship
2	Bosnia and Herzegovina	6	3	3	9	11	9	1.222	445	426	1.045	2021 Women's European Volleyball Championship
3	Slovenia	6	3	3	9	10	11	0.909	479	476	1.006	
4	Latvia	6	0	6	0	1	18	0.056	337	478	0.705	

Tournament 1

- Venue: Daugavpils Olympic Centre, Daugavpils, Latvia

Date	Time		Score		Set 1	Set 2	Set 3	Set 4	Set 5	Total	Report
6 May	16.00	Slovenia	0–3	Bosnia and Herzegovina	23–25	20–25	24–26			67–76	Report
6 May	19.40	Latvia	0–3	Czech Republic	19–25	17–25	9–25			45–75	Report
7 May	16.00	Bosnia and Herzegovina	0–3	Czech Republic	23–25	18–25	17–25			58–75	Report
7 May	19.40	Slovenia	3–0	Latvia	25–15	29–27	25–14			79–56	Report
8 May	16.00	Czech Republic	3–1	Slovenia	21–25	25–22	25–19	25–16		96–82	Report
8 May	19.40	Bosnia and Herzegovina	3–0	Latvia	25–10	25–14	25–22			75–46	Report

Tournament 2

- Venue: Gradska Arena "Husejin Smajlović", Zenica, Bosnia and Herzegovina

Date	Time		Score		Set 1	Set 2	Set 3	Set 4	Set 5	Total	Report
14 May	17.00	Latvia	1–3	Slovenia	14–25	22–25	25–23	21–25		82–98	Report
14 May	20.00	Bosnia and Herzegovina	1–3	Czech Republic	25–19	22–25	9–25	14–25		70–94	Report
15 May	17.00	Slovenia	0–3	Czech Republic	18–25	15–25	22–25			55–75	Report
15 May	20.00	Latvia	0–3	Bosnia and Herzegovina	20–25	15–25	11–25			46–75	Report
16 May	17.00	Czech Republic	3–0	Latvia	25–18	26–24	25–20			76–62	Report
16 May	20.00	Slovenia	3–1	Bosnia and Herzegovina	23–25	25–22	25–22	25–22		98–91	Report
