= 2017 Women's European Volleyball Championship qualification =

This is an article about qualification for the 2017 Women's European Volleyball Championship.

== Qualification summary ==
Means of qualification	Qualifier
Host Country	Azerbaijan
Host Country	Georgia
2015 European Championship	Russia
2015 European Championship	Netherlands
2015 European Championship	Serbia
2015 European Championship	Turkey
2015 European Championship	Germany

Means of qualification		Qualifier
Second Round Winners	Pool A	Italy
Second Round Winners	Pool B	Belgium
Second Round Winners	Pool C	Poland
Second Round Winners	Pool D	Croatia
Second Round Winners	Pool E	Bulgaria
Second Round Winners	Pool F	Belarus
Third Round Winners		Hungary
Third Round Winners		Czech Republic
Third Round Winners		Ukraine

Total 16

== Pool standing procedure ==
1. Number of matches won
2. Match points
3. Sets ratio
4. Points ratio
5. Result of the last match between the tied teams

Match won 3–0 or 3–1: 3 match points for the winner, 0 match points for the loser
Match won 3–2: 2 match points for the winner, 1 match point for the loser

== Direct qualification ==
The host country team(s) and the best ranked teams in 2015 European Championship, total 7 teams, directly qualified for 2017 European Championship.

Rank	Team	Qualification
1st place, gold medalist(s)	Russia	Qualified for the 2017 European Championship
2nd place, silver medalist(s)	Netherlands	Qualified for the 2017 European Championship
3rd place, bronze medalist(s)	Serbia	Qualified for the 2017 European Championship
4	Turkey	Qualified for the 2017 European Championship
5	Germany	Qualified for the 2017 European Championship
6	Belgium	
7	Italy	
8	Poland	
9	Belarus	
10	Croatia	
11	Czech Republic	
12	Hungary	
13	Bulgaria	
14	Azerbaijan	2017 European Championship as host country
15	Romania	
16	Slovenia	
–	Georgia	2017 European Championship as host country

== First round ==
First round was held 20–22 May 2016. 8 teams competed in two first round tournaments consisting of 4 teams. The top ranked teams of each pools and the best 2nd placed teams with the best score qualified for the second round.

- Pools composition

Pool 1	Pool 2
Denmark	Montenegro
Sweden	Bosnia and Herzegovina
Estonia	Lithuania
Luxembourg	Norway

All times are local.

=== Pool 1 ===
- Venue: Audentes Sports Hall, Tallinn, Estonia

Pos	Team	Pld	W	L	Pts	SW	SL	SR	SPW	SPL	SPR	Qualification
1	Estonia	3	3	0	8	9	2	4.500	251	192	1.307	Second round
2	Sweden	3	2	1	7	8	4	2.000	270	231	1.169	
3	Denmark	3	1	2	3	4	6	0.667	198	219	0.904	
4	Luxembourg	3	0	3	0	0	9	0.000	148	225	0.658	

Date	Time		Score		Set 1	Set 2	Set 3	Set 4	Set 5	Total	Report
20 May	15:30	Denmark	1–3	Sweden	10–25	25–19	25–27	16–25		76–96	Report
20 May	18:00	Estonia	3–0	Luxembourg	25–18	25–16	25–12			75–46	Report
21 May	15:30	Sweden	3–0	Luxembourg	25–19	25–19	25–16			75–54	Report
21 May	18:00	Denmark	0–3	Estonia	13–25	17–25	17–25			47–75	Report
22 May	15:30	Luxembourg	0–3	Denmark	14–25	17–25	17–25			48–75	Report
22 May	18:00	Sweden	2–3	Estonia	25–16	25–17	16–25	17–25	16–18	99–101	Report

=== Pool 2 ===
- Venue: Alytus Sports and Recreation centre, Alytus, Lithuania

Pos	Team	Pld	W	L	Pts	SW	SL	SR	SPW	SPL	SPR	Qualification
1	Bosnia and Herzegovina	3	3	0	7	9	4	2.250	285	233	1.223	Second round
2	Montenegro	3	2	1	7	8	4	2.000	278	234	1.188	Second round
3	Norway	3	1	2	2	3	8	0.375	194	260	0.746	
4	Lithuania	3	0	3	2	5	9	0.556	273	303	0.901	

Date	Time		Score		Set 1	Set 2	Set 3	Set 4	Set 5	Total	Report
20 May	15:30	Norway	0–3	Bosnia and Herzegovina	19–25	13–25	11–25			43–75	Report
20 May	18:00	Lithuania	1–3	Montenegro	19–25	22–25	25–22	13–25		79–97	Report
21 May	15:30	Bosnia and Herzegovina	3–2	Montenegro	25–23	25–27	13–25	25–22	15–9	103–106	Report
21 May	18:00	Norway	3–2	Lithuania	20–25	12–25	27–25	25–23	15–12	99–110	Report
22 May	15:30	Montenegro	3–0	Norway	25–19	25–18	25–15			75–52	Report
22 May	18:00	Bosnia and Herzegovina	3–2	Lithuania	21–25	21–25	25–8	25–18	15–8	107–84	Report

=== Ranking of the 2nd placed teams ===
Pos	Team	Pld	W	L	Pts	SW	SL	SR	SPW	SPL	SPR	Qualification
1	Montenegro	3	2	1	7	8	4	2.000	278	234	1.188	Second round
2	Sweden	3	2	1	7	8	4	2.000	270	231	1.169	

== Second round ==
24 teams competed in the second round, where each pool of 4 teams played in 2 tournaments in 15–25 September 2016. The 1st placed teams of each pool qualified directly for the 2017 Championship. The 2nd placed teams of each pool qualified for the third round.

- Pools composition

Pool A	Pool B	Pool C	Pool D	Pool E	Pool F
Italy	Belgium	Poland	Croatia	Bulgaria	Czech Republic
Ukraine	France	Hungary	Israel	Romania	Belarus
Austria	Spain	Finland	Slovakia	Switzerland	Greece
Latvia	Bosnia & Herz.	Estonia	Portugal	Montenegro	Slovenia

All times are local.

=== Pool A ===
Pos	Team	Pld	W	L	Pts	SW	SL	SR	SPW	SPL	SPR	Qualification
1	Italy	6	6	0	17	18	3	6.000	499	332	1.503	2017 European Championship
2	Ukraine	6	4	2	13	15	6	2.500	462	359	1.287	Third round
3	Austria	6	2	4	5	6	14	0.429	375	447	0.839	
4	Latvia	6	0	6	1	2	18	0.111	288	486	0.593	

- Venue: FSK Olymp, Yuzhne, Ukraine

Date	Time		Score		Set 1	Set 2	Set 3	Set 4	Set 5	Total	Report
16 Sep	16:00	Austria	0–3	Ukraine	24–26	13–25	13–25			50–76	Report
16 Sep	18:30	Italy	3–0	Latvia	25–12	25–15	25–6			75–33	Report
17 Sep	16:00	Ukraine	3–0	Latvia	25–10	25–14	25–17			75–41	Report
17 Sep	18:30	Austria	0–3	Italy	14–25	12–25	22–25			48–75	Report
18 Sep	16:00	Ukraine	2–3	Italy	17–25	25–21	25–19	11–25	12–15	90–105	Report
18 Sep	18:30	Latvia	2–3	Austria	18–25	25–23	25–23	13–25	11–15	92–111	Report

- Venue: Palaterme, Montecatini Terme, Italy

Date	Time		Score		Set 1	Set 2	Set 3	Set 4	Set 5	Total	Report
23 Sep	17:00	Latvia	0–3	Ukraine	12–25	9–25	12–25			33–75	Report
23 Sep	20:30	Italy	3–0	Austria	25–15	26–24	25–15			76–54	Report
24 Sep	17:00	Ukraine	3–0	Austria	25–15	25–12	25–10			75–37	Report
24 Sep	20:30	Latvia	0–3	Italy	8–25	13–25	15–25			36–75	Report
25 Sep	17:00	Austria	3–0	Latvia	25–19	25–18	25–16			75–53	Report
25 Sep	20:30	Ukraine	1–3	Italy	11–25	25–18	20–25	15–25		71–93	Report

=== Pool B ===
Pos	Team	Pld	W	L	Pts	SW	SL	SR	SPW	SPL	SPR	Qualification
1	Belgium	6	6	0	17	18	3	6.000	516	363	1.421	2017 European Championship
2	Spain	6	3	3	10	12	9	1.333	489	456	1.072	Third round
3	France	6	3	3	9	10	11	0.909	457	477	0.958	
4	Bosnia and Herzegovina	6	0	6	0	1	18	0.056	305	471	0.648	

- Venue: Palais des Sports de Bordeaux, Bordeaux, France

Date	Time		Score		Set 1	Set 2	Set 3	Set 4	Set 5	Total	Report
16 Sep	17:00	Bosnia and Herzegovina	0–3	Spain	18–25	17–25	15–25			50–75	Report
16 Sep	20:00	France	1–3	Belgium	20–25	26–24	17–25	23–25		86–99	Report
17 Sep	17:00	Spain	2–3	Belgium	15–25	25–19	25–22	21–25	11–15	97–106	Report
17 Sep	20:00	Bosnia and Herzegovina	0–3	France	13–25	18–25	19–25			50–75	Report
18 Sep	15:00	Belgium	3–0	Bosnia and Herzegovina	25–3	25–9	28–26			78–38	Report
18 Sep	18:00	Spain	3–0	France	25–14	25–22	25–19			75–55	Report

- Venue: Lotto Arena, Antwerp, Belgium

Date	Time		Score		Set 1	Set 2	Set 3	Set 4	Set 5	Total	Report
22 Sep	15:00	Spain	3–0	Bosnia and Herzegovina	25–22	25–18	25–16			75–56	Report
22 Sep	20:00	France	0–3	Belgium	15–25	12–25	15–25			42–75	Report
23 Sep	17:30	Bosnia and Herzegovina	1–3	France	23–25	25–18	15–25	22–25		85–93	Report
24 Sep	15:00	Belgium	3–0	Bosnia and Herzegovina	25–13	25–8	25–5			75–26	Report
24 Sep	20:00	Spain	1–3	France	20–25	33–31	23–25	17–25		93–106	Report
25 Sep	17:30	Belgium	3–0	Spain	25–20	29–27	29–27			83–74	Report

=== Pool C ===
Pos	Team	Pld	W	L	Pts	SW	SL	SR	SPW	SPL	SPR	Qualification
1	Poland	6	6	0	18	18	2	9.000	493	373	1.322	2017 European Championship
2	Hungary	6	4	2	10	13	12	1.083	531	533	0.996	Third round
3	Finland	6	1	5	4	9	17	0.529	534	581	0.919	
4	Estonia	6	1	5	4	8	17	0.471	479	550	0.871	

- Venue: Érd Aréna, Érd, Hungary

Date	Time		Score		Set 1	Set 2	Set 3	Set 4	Set 5	Total	Report
16 Sep	16:00	Finland	0–3	Poland	19–25	16–25	21–25			56–75	Report
16 Sep	18:30	Hungary	3–1	Estonia	25–19	25–22	16–25	25–11		91–77	Report
17 Sep	16:00	Poland	3–0	Estonia	25–17	25–16	25–17			75–50	Report
17 Sep	18:30	Finland	1–3	Hungary	27–25	19–25	19–25	20–25		85–100	Report
18 Sep	16:00	Estonia	3–2	Finland	25–13	22–25	20–25	25–20	15–11	107–94	Report
18 Sep	18:30	Poland	3–1	Hungary	23–25	25–14	25–20	25–22		98–81	Report

- Venue: BKS Stal Bielsko-Biała, Bielsko-Biała, Poland

Date	Time		Score		Set 1	Set 2	Set 3	Set 4	Set 5	Total	Report
23 Sep	17:30	Finland	2–3	Hungary	23–25	25–18	23–25	25–22	9–15	105–105	Report
23 Sep	20:00	Poland	3–0	Estonia	25–19	25–17	25–17			75–53	Report
24 Sep	15:00	Hungary	3–2	Estonia	25–16	20–25	23–25	25–14	15–13	108–93	Report
24 Sep	17:30	Finland	1–3	Poland	23–25	20–25	25–20	19–25		87–95	Report
25 Sep	17:30	Estonia	2–3	Finland	21–25	25–20	15–25	25–22	13–15	99–107	Report
25 Sep	20:00	Hungary	0–3	Poland	18–25	18–25	10–25			46–75	Report

=== Pool D ===
Pos	Team	Pld	W	L	Pts	SW	SL	SR	SPW	SPL	SPR	Qualification
1	Croatia	6	6	0	18	18	1	18.000	481	362	1.329	2017 European Championship
2	Slovakia	6	4	2	12	12	10	1.200	492	479	1.027	Third round
3	Portugal	6	2	4	6	8	13	0.615	440	481	0.915	
4	Israel	6	0	6	0	4	18	0.222	457	548	0.834	

- Venue: Póvoa de Varzim Municipal Stadium, Póvoa de Varzim, Portugal

Date	Time		Score		Set 1	Set 2	Set 3	Set 4	Set 5	Total	Report
16 Sep	16:00	Slovakia	0–3	Croatia	12–25	15–25	18–25			45–75	Report
16 Sep	19:00	Portugal	3–0	Israel	25–15	26–24	28–26			79–65	Report
17 Sep	15:00	Croatia	3–0	Israel	25–9	25–21	27–25			77–55	Report
17 Sep	18:00	Slovakia	3–1	Portugal	25–19	25–17	23–25	25–21		98–82	Report
18 Sep	15:00	Israel	1–3	Slovakia	17–25	25–18	20–25	21–25		83–93	Report
18 Sep	18:00	Croatia	3–0	Portugal	25–15	25–17	25–18			75–50	Report

- Venue: Dvorana Gimnasium, Rovinj, Croatia

Date	Time		Score		Set 1	Set 2	Set 3	Set 4	Set 5	Total	Report
22 Sep	15:00	Slovakia	3–1	Israel	25–15	25–23	21–25	27–25		98–88	Report
23 Sep	15:00	Portugal	3–1	Israel	25–19	23–25	25–19	25–12		98–75	Report
23 Sep	20:00	Croatia	3–0	Slovakia	25–21	25–20	26–24			76–65	Report
24 Sep	20:00	Croatia	3–0	Portugal	25–21	25–15	25–20			75–56	Report
25 Sep	15:00	Slovakia	3–1	Portugal	25–19	25–14	18–25	25–17		93–75	Report
25 Sep	20:00	Israel	1–3	Croatia	26–28	15–25	26–24	24–26		91–103	Report

=== Pool E ===
Pos	Team	Pld	W	L	Pts	SW	SL	SR	SPW	SPL	SPR	Qualification
1	Bulgaria	6	6	0	17	18	3	6.000	509	361	1.410	2017 European Championship
2	Romania	6	3	3	9	10	10	1.000	437	424	1.031	Third round
3	Montenegro	6	2	4	7	9	14	0.643	457	525	0.870	
4	Switzerland	6	1	5	3	7	17	0.412	452	545	0.829	

- Venue: Hristo Botev stadium, Sofia, Bulgaria

Date	Time		Score		Set 1	Set 2	Set 3	Set 4	Set 5	Total	Report
16 Sep	15:30	Montenegro	3–1	Romania	25–23	25–21	21–25	25–19		96–88	Report
16 Sep	18:00	Bulgaria	3–0	Switzerland	25–18	25–13	25–14			75–45	Report
17 Sep	15:30	Romania	3–1	Switzerland	25–23	19–25	25–20	25–22		94–90	Report
17 Sep	18:00	Montenegro	0–3	Bulgaria	18–25	19–25	11–25			48–75	Report
18 Sep	15:30	Switzerland	3–2	Montenegro	16–25	25–12	25–20	23–25	15–13	104–95	Report
18 Sep	18:00	Romania	0–3	Bulgaria	22–25	15–25	20–25			57–75	Report

- Venue: Polyvalent Hall, Piatra Neamț, Romania

Date	Time		Score		Set 1	Set 2	Set 3	Set 4	Set 5	Total	Report
22 Sep	17:00	Switzerland	0–3	Romania	12–25	11–25	14–25			37–75	Report
22 Sep	19:45	Bulgaria	3–1	Montenegro	26–28	25–11	25–12	25–18		101–69	Report
23 Sep	17:00	Romania	3–0	Montenegro	25–17	25–19	25–15			75–51	Report
23 Sep	19:45	Switzerland	2–3	Bulgaria	25–20	17–25	25–23	15–25	12–15	94–108	Report
24 Sep	17:00	Romania	0–3	Bulgaria	18–25	8–25	22–25			48–75	Report
24 Sep	19:45	Montenegro	3–1	Switzerland	25–21	23–25	25–16	25–20		98–82	Report

=== Pool F ===
Pos	Team	Pld	W	L	Pts	SW	SL	SR	SPW	SPL	SPR	Qualification
1	Belarus	6	5	1	13	17	9	1.889	569	523	1.088	2017 European Championship
2	Czech Republic	6	4	2	12	15	8	1.875	531	456	1.164	Third round
3	Slovenia	6	3	3	9	11	13	0.846	504	509	0.990	
4	Greece	6	0	6	2	5	18	0.278	428	544	0.787	

- Venue: Sportovní hala Vodova, Brno, Czech Republic

Date	Time		Score		Set 1	Set 2	Set 3	Set 4	Set 5	Total	Report
16 Sep	15:00	Slovenia	2–3	Belarus	25–13	25–20	16–25	20–25	12–15	98–98	Report
16 Sep	18:00	Czech Republic	3–0	Greece	25–12	25–20	25–15			75–47	Report
17 Sep	15:00	Belarus	3–2	Greece	25–16	25–14	22–25	24–26	15–12	111–93	Report
17 Sep	18:00	Slovenia	0–3	Czech Republic	20–25	16–25	13–25			49–75	Report
18 Sep	15:00	Greece	1–3	Slovenia	16–25	25–21	20–25	8–25		69–96	Report
18 Sep	18:00	Belarus	3–2	Czech Republic	20–25	25–22	19–25	26–24	15–10	105–106	Report

- Venue: Tabor Hall, Maribor, Slovenia

Date	Time		Score		Set 1	Set 2	Set 3	Set 4	Set 5	Total	Report
23 Sep	16:00	Belarus	2–3	Czech Republic	24–26	24–26	25–22	25–21	7–15	105–110	Report
23 Sep	19:00	Slovenia	3–2	Greece	23–25	25–20	26–24	23–25	15–8	112–102	Report
24 Sep	16:00	Czech Republic	3–0	Greece	25–20	25–13	25–22			75–55	Report
24 Sep	19:00	Belarus	3–0	Slovenia	25–21	25–17	25–16			75–54	Report
25 Sep	16:00	Greece	0–3	Belarus	22–25	21–25	19–25			62–75	Report
25 Sep	19:00	Czech Republic	1–3	Slovenia	24–26	25–19	20–25	21–25		90–95	Report

== Third round ==
The 2nd placed teams of the second round will play one home and one away match to determine the 3 winners who will then subsequently be qualified through to the 2017 Championship. The third round matches will be held on 1–9 October 2016.

Team 1	Agg.	Team 2	1st leg	2nd leg	Golden Set
Romania	3–3	Hungary	3–0	1–3	13–15
Czech Republic	4–2	Slovakia	3–0	2–3	
Ukraine	4–2	Spain	2–3	3–1	

=== First leg ===
Date	Time		Score		Set 1	Set 2	Set 3	Set 4	Set 5	Total	Report
1 Oct	15:45	Ukraine	2–3	Spain	22–25	23–25	29–27	25–23	12–15	111–115	Report
1 Oct	17:00	Romania	3–0	Hungary	25–17	25–18	25–15			75–50	Report
1 Oct	19:00	Czech Republic	3–0	Slovakia	25–14	25–20	25–15			75–49	Report

=== Second leg ===
Date	Time		Score		Set 1	Set 2	Set 3	Set 4	Set 5	Total	Report
5 Oct	17:00	Slovakia	3–2	Czech Republic	26–28	25–19	23–25	25–22	15–10	114–104	Report
7 Oct	20:00	Spain	1–3	Ukraine	21–25	25–22	22–25	14–25		82–97	Report
9 Oct	18:00	Hungary	3–1	Romania	14–25	25–22	27–25	25–19		91–91	Report
Golden set		Hungary	15–13	Romania							
