= 2023 Women's European Volleyball Championship qualification =

This article describes the qualification for the 2023 Women's European Volleyball Championship.

== Qualification ==
Belgium, Italy, Estonia and Germany as host countries were directly qualified. The eight best placed teams at the 2021 edition also gained direct entries into the tournament. 24 teams compete for the remaining 12 places at the final tournament.

Means of qualification	Qualifier	Means of qualification		Qualifier
Host Countries	Belgium	Qualification	Pool A	Romania
Host Countries	Italy	Qualification	Pool A	Croatia
Host Countries	Estonia	Qualification	Pool B	Czech Republic
Host Countries	Germany	Qualification	Pool B	Finland
2021 European Championship	Serbia	Qualification	Pool C	Ukraine
2021 European Championship	Turkey	Qualification	Pool C	Hungary
2021 European Championship	Netherlands	Qualification	Pool D	Slovenia
2021 European Championship	Poland	Qualification	Pool D	Azerbaijan
2021 European Championship	France	Qualification	Pool E	Slovakia
2021 European Championship	Sweden	Qualification	Pool E	Spain
2021 European Championship	Bulgaria	Qualification	Pool F	Bosnia and Herzegovina
Reallocation	Switzerland	Qualification	Pool F	Greece
Total 24

== Direct qualification ==
All of the hosted countries' teams directly qualified for the tournament. Then, the top eight teams from previous edition also automatically qualified.

- 2021 Women's European Volleyball Championship final standing

Qualified for the 2023 European Championship
Qualified as hosts for the 2023 European Championship

Rank	Team
1st place, gold medalist(s)	Italy
2nd place, silver medalist(s)	Serbia
3rd place, bronze medalist(s)	Turkey
4	Netherlands
5	Poland
6	~~Russia~~ (Note: Russian and Belarusian athletes were banned from competing following the 2022 Russian invasion of Ukraine.)
7	France
8	Sweden
9	Bulgaria
10	Croatia
11	Germany
12	Ukraine
13	Belgium
14	~~Belarus~~
15	Czech Republic
16	Hungary
17	Slovakia
18	Finland
19	Bosnia and Herzegovina
20	Switzerland
21	Spain
22	Greece
23	Romania
24	Azerbaijan
–	Estonia

== Pools composition ==
The pools were set following the Serpentine system according to their European Ranking for national teams as of January 2022. Rankings are shown in brackets.

Pool A	Pool B	Pool C	Pool D	Pool E	Pool F
Croatia (10)	Czech Republic (11)	Ukraine (13)	Slovenia (14)	Slovakia (15)	Greece (17)
Israel (24)	Finland (23)	Hungary (22)	Austria (20)	Spain (19)	Bosnia and Herzegovina (18)
Romania (25)	Montenegro (26)	Portugal (27)	Azerbaijan (28)	Denmark (29)	Norway (30)
Faroe Islands (40)	Iceland (36)	Cyprus (35)	Georgia (34)	Latvia (33)	Switzerland (31)

== Results ==
=== Pool A ===
Pos	Team	Pld	W	L	Pts	SW	SL	SR	SPW	SPL	SPR	Qualification
1	Romania	6	5	1	14	16	6	2.667	514	391	1.315	2023 Women's European Volleyball Championship
2	Croatia	6	5	1	14	16	7	2.286	551	440	1.252	2023 Women's European Volleyball Championship
3	Israel	6	2	4	8	11	12	0.917	484	481	1.006	
4	Faroe Islands	6	0	6	0	0	18	0.000	213	450	0.473	

Date	Time		Score		Set 1	Set 2	Set 3	Set 4	Set 5	Total	Report
20 Aug	17:00	Romania	3–0	Israel	25–16	25–13	25–10			75–39	Report
21 Aug	19:00	Croatia	3–0	Faroe Islands	25–8	25–10	25–15			75–33	Report
24 Aug	19:00	Faroe Islands	0–3	Romania	18–25	10–25	11–25			39–75	Report
24 Aug	19:30	Israel	1–3	Croatia	28–26	20–25	29–31	16–25		93–107	Report
27 Aug	19:30	Israel	3–0	Faroe Islands	25–12	25–15	25–16			75–43	Report
28 Aug	19:00	Croatia	3–1	Romania	25–27	25–21	25–20	25–17		100–85	Report
3 Sep	17:00	Romania	3–1	Croatia	19–25	25–21	25–19	25–18		94–83	Report
4 Sep	17:00	Faroe Islands	0–3	Israel	9–25	11–25	15–25			35–75	Report
7 Sep	17:00	Romania	3–0	Faroe Islands	25–13	25–6	25–15			75–34	Report
7 Sep	19:00	Croatia	3–2	Israel	25–22	22–25	23–25	26–24	15–9	111–105	Report
11 Sep	17:00	Faroe Islands	0–3	Croatia	10–25	6–25	13–25			29–75	Report
11 Sep	19:30	Israel	2–3	Romania	25–22	15–25	21–25	25–23	10–15	96–110	Report

=== Pool B ===
Pos	Team	Pld	W	L	Pts	SW	SL	SR	SPW	SPL	SPR	Qualification
1	Czech Republic	6	6	0	18	18	1	18.000	475	322	1.475	2023 Women's European Volleyball Championship
2	Finland	6	4	2	12	12	8	1.500	476	404	1.178	2023 Women's European Volleyball Championship
3	Montenegro	6	2	4	6	9	12	0.750	437	471	0.928	
4	Iceland	6	0	6	0	0	18	0.000	259	450	0.576	

Date	Time		Score		Set 1	Set 2	Set 3	Set 4	Set 5	Total	Report
20 Aug	18:00	Czech Republic	3–0	Iceland	25–14	25–5	25–17			75–36	Report
21 Aug	17:30	Montenegro	1–3	Finland	25–23	12–25	14–25	24–26		75–99	Report
24 Aug	18:00	Montenegro	3–0	Iceland	25–7	25–18	25–17			75–42	Report
24 Aug	18:30	Finland	0–3	Czech Republic	24–26	20–25	23–25			67–76	Report
27 Aug	18:00	Czech Republic	3–0	Montenegro	25–14	25–17	25–21			75–52	Report
27 Aug	18:00	Finland	3–0	Iceland	25–19	25–16	25–13			75–48	Report
3 Sep	15:00	Iceland	0–3	Finland	15–25	12–25	19–25			46–75	Report
4 Sep	17:30	Montenegro	1–3	Czech Republic	14–25	26–24	22–25	14–25		76–99	Report
7 Sep	18:00	Czech Republic	3–0	Finland	25–19	25–18	25–21			75–58	Report
7 Sep	18:30	Iceland	0–3	Montenegro	23–25	20–25	11–25			54–75	Report
10 Sep	17:00	Finland	3–1	Montenegro	25–17	25–20	27–29	25–18		102–84	Report
11 Sep	15:00	Iceland	0–3	Czech Republic	15–25	10–25	8–25			33–75	Report

=== Pool C ===
Pos	Team	Pld	W	L	Pts	SW	SL	SR	SPW	SPL	SPR	Qualification
1	Ukraine	6	6	0	17	18	2	9.000	489	325	1.505	2023 Women's European Volleyball Championship
2	Hungary	6	4	2	13	14	6	2.333	444	368	1.207	2023 Women's European Volleyball Championship
3	Portugal	6	2	4	6	6	12	0.500	345	392	0.880	
4	Cyprus	6	0	6	0	0	18	0.000	257	450	0.571	

Date	Time		Score		Set 1	Set 2	Set 3	Set 4	Set 5	Total	Report
20 Aug	18:00	Portugal	0–3	Hungary	18–25	18–25	14–25			50–75	Report
20 Aug	18:00	Ukraine	3–0	Cyprus	25–17	25–14	25–9			75–40	Report
24 Aug	18:00	Hungary	2–3	Ukraine	25–23	16–25	16–25	28–26	12–15	97–114	Report
24 Aug	20:00	Cyprus	0–3	Portugal	11–25	22–25	20–25			53–75	Report
27 Aug	17:45	Hungary	3–0	Cyprus	25–13	25–10	25–17			75–40	Report
28 Aug	18:00	Ukraine	3–0	Portugal	25–17	25–21	25–8			75–46	Report
3 Sep	20:00	Cyprus	0–3	Hungary	13–25	19–25	7–25			39–75	Report
4 Sep	18:00	Portugal	0–3	Ukraine	21–25	16–25	12–25			49–75	Report
7 Sep	18:00	Ukraine	3–0	Hungary	25–16	25–15	25–16			75–47	Report
7 Sep	21:00	Portugal	3–0	Cyprus	25–16	25–10	25–13			75–39	Report
10 Sep	19:00	Hungary	3–0	Portugal	25–16	25–17	25–17			75–50	Report
10 Sep	20:00	Cyprus	0–3	Ukraine	15–25	14–25	17–25			46–75	Report

=== Pool D ===
Pos	Team	Pld	W	L	Pts	SW	SL	SR	SPW	SPL	SPR	Qualification
1	Slovenia	6	6	0	17	18	4	4.500	522	413	1.264	2023 Women's European Volleyball Championship
2	Azerbaijan	6	4	2	12	14	7	2.000	475	405	1.173	2023 Women's European Volleyball Championship
3	Austria	6	2	4	7	9	12	0.750	433	455	0.952	
4	Georgia	6	0	6	0	0	18	0.000	296	453	0.653	

Date	Time		Score		Set 1	Set 2	Set 3	Set 4	Set 5	Total	Report
20 Aug	18:00	Azerbaijan	3–0	Georgia	28–26	25–11	25–20			78–57	Report
20 Aug	19:30	Slovenia	3–0	Austria	25–21	25–12	28–26			78–59	Report
24 Aug	17:00	Georgia	0–3	Azerbaijan	14–25	14–25	7–25			35–75	Report
24 Aug	20:25	Austria	2–3	Slovenia	17–25	25–14	19–25	29–27	9–15	99–106	Report
27 Aug	17:00	Georgia	0–3	Slovenia	17–25	12–25	23–25			52–75	Report
28 Aug	18:00	Azerbaijan	3–0	Austria	25–19	25–19	25–13			75–51	Report
3 Sep	17:00	Georgia	0–3	Austria	17–25	18–25	18–25			53–75	Report
3 Sep	18:00	Azerbaijan	1–3	Slovenia	11–25	25–19	18–25	21–25		75–94	Report
7 Sep	15:30	Slovenia	3–1	Azerbaijan	25–16	25–18	19–25	25–15		94–74	Report
7 Sep	20:25	Austria	3–0	Georgia	25–10	25–19	25–16			75–45	Report
10 Sep	15:30	Slovenia	3–0	Georgia	25–18	25–16	25–20			75–54	Report
10 Sep	20:25	Austria	1–3	Azerbaijan	14–25	20–25	25–23	15–25		74–98	Report

=== Pool E ===
Pos	Team	Pld	W	L	Pts	SW	SL	SR	SPW	SPL	SPR	Qualification
1	Slovakia	6	5	1	15	16	3	5.333	458	299	1.532	2023 Women's European Volleyball Championship
2	Spain	6	5	1	15	15	5	3.000	469	391	1.199	2023 Women's European Volleyball Championship
3	Denmark	6	1	5	4	5	15	0.333	371	461	0.805	
4	Latvia	6	1	5	2	4	17	0.235	359	506	0.709	

Date	Time		Score		Set 1	Set 2	Set 3	Set 4	Set 5	Total	Report
20 Aug	16:30	Denmark	0–3	Spain	17–25	16–25	19–25			52–75	Report
20 Aug	18:00	Slovakia	3–0	Latvia	25–10	25–12	25–21			75–43	Report
24 Aug	19:30	Spain	3–1	Slovakia	25–23	25–18	13–25	25–15		88–81	Report
24 Aug	19:30	Latvia	3–2	Denmark	25–21	25–23	17–25	20–25	16–14	103–108	Report
27 Aug	18:00	Slovakia	3–0	Denmark	25–8	25–13	25–13			75–34	Report
27 Aug	19:30	Spain	3–1	Latvia	25–17	25–15	22–25	25–20		97–77	Report
4 Sep	17:00	Latvia	0–3	Spain	14–25	15–25	16–25			45–75	Report
4 Sep	17:00	Denmark	0–3	Slovakia	20–25	14–25	8–25			42–75	Report
7 Sep	18:00	Slovakia	3–0	Spain	27–25	25–13	25–21			77–59	Report
7 Sep	18:00	Denmark	3–0	Latvia	25–17	25–17	26–24			76–58	Report
11 Sep	17:00	Latvia	0–3	Slovakia	10–25	14–25	9–25			33–75	Report
11 Sep	17:00	Spain	3–0	Denmark	25–16	25–21	25–22			75–59	Report

=== Pool F ===
Pos	Team	Pld	W	L	Pts	SW	SL	SR	SPW	SPL	SPR	Qualification
1	Bosnia and Herzegovina	6	5	1	15	15	5	3.000	477	387	1.233	2023 Women's European Volleyball Championship
2	Greece	6	4	2	12	13	6	2.167	449	372	1.207	2023 Women's European Volleyball Championship
3	Switzerland^{[a]}	6	3	3	9	11	10	1.100	491	456	1.077	2023 Women's European Volleyball Championship
4	Norway	6	0	6	0	0	18	0.000	248	450	0.551	

^{[a]} Switzerland replaced Russia and qualified by being the third place team with the best record.

Date	Time		Score		Set 1	Set 2	Set 3	Set 4	Set 5	Total	Report
20 Aug	20:30	Greece	3–0	Switzerland	25–17	26–24	25–23			76–64	Report
24 Aug	19:30	Switzerland	3–0	Norway	25–10	25–9	25–21			75–40	Report
24 Aug	20:00	Bosnia and Herzegovina	0–3	Greece	13–25	20–25	19–25			52–75	Report
27 Aug	20:00	Bosnia and Herzegovina	3–1	Switzerland	25–19	25–20	26–28	25–23		101–90	Report
27 Aug	20:30	Greece	3–0	Norway	25–12	25–16	25–11			75–39	Report
3 Sep	16:00	Norway	0–3	Greece	7–25	11–25	20–25			38–75	Report
3 Sep	18:30	Switzerland	1–3	Bosnia and Herzegovina	25–22	22–25	11–25	25–27		83–99	Report
7 Sep	18:00	Norway	0–3	Switzerland	18–25	17–25	20–25			55–75	Report
7 Sep	20:30	Greece	0–3	Bosnia and Herzegovina	21–25	22–25	20–25			63–75	Report
9 Sep	20:00	Norway	0–3	Bosnia and Herzegovina	8–25	6–25	14–25			28–75	Report
10 Sep	19:00	Bosnia and Herzegovina	3–0	Norway	25–17	25–19	25–12			75–48	Report
11 Sep	17:30	Switzerland	3–1	Greece	31–29	23–25	25–16	25–15		104–85	Report
