= Montenegro women's national volleyball team =

National sports team

Montenegro
- Association: Volleyball Federation of Montenegro
- Confederation: CEV
- Head coach: (Montenegro) Jovo Caković
- FIVB ranking: 43 (24 May 2026)

Uniforms
Home	Away

European Championship
- Appearances: 1 (First in 2026)
- Best result: TBD

The Montenegro women's national volleyball team is the national team of Montenegro. It is governed by the Volleyball Federation of Montenegro and takes part in international volleyball competitions.

== History ==
=== Period 2006–2016 ===
Soon after the Montenegrin independence referendum, Volleyball Federation of Montenegro founded national teams. Women's team started to play in 2008, with the first match against Albania (3:0, friendly game).
Same year, Montenegro played its first games in official competitions – against Georgia in 2009 European Volleyball Championship qualifiers.
During the time, Montenegro played in qualifiers for European championship 2009, 2011, 2013 and 2015. National team participated in qualifiers for 2014 FIVB Volleyball World Championship, too.
In the period from 2006 to 2016, Montenegro didn't qualify for a European Championship or World Championship, but had significant results in 2013 and 2014 qualifiers.
At 2015, Montenegro participated at Games of the Small States of Europe, an event for states with less than million inhabitants. Montenegrin team won the gold medal, with four wins and sets score 12–0.

=== Period 2016– ===
On spring 2016, Montenegro women's team for the first time played in 2016 Women's European Volleyball League.
At the same time, the team started to play in qualifiers for European Championship 2017. Montenegro made score 2–1 in the first stage of qualifiers and participated on the final stage, but at the end, with the score 2–4, didn't succeed to qualify for their first big tournament.
In spring 2016, Montenegrin women's team played for the first time in European Volleyball League, finishing with score 2–4. Same score they made in European Volleyball League 2017.
In 2019, Montenegro once again won gold medal on the Games of Small States on Europe. From the other side, national team don't have success to qualify on European Championship in another three occasions - 2019, 2021 and 2023. However, after a successful 2026 qualifying campaign they will finally head to the EuroVolley for the first time in 2026.

== Competitive record ==
Until now, Montenegro never played on any major tournament. They participated in the qualifiers for European Championship (8 times) and World Championship (2 times). Montenegro played in European League, too (3 times). Biggest successes of the team were two gold medals at the Games of the Small States of Europe.

=== World Championship ===
Montenegro women's national volleyball team participated in the qualifiers for two World Championships (2014, 2018), but never played at main competition.

World Championship					Qualification		
Year	Pos.	Pld	W	L	Pld	W	L
(Italy) 2014	did not qualify				8	2	6
(Japan) 2018	did not qualify				5	1	4
(Netherlands) (Poland) 2022	did not qualify				-	-	-
(Thailand) 2025	did not qualify				-	-	-
(Canada) (United States) 2027	to be determined				TBD		
(Philippines) 2029	to be determined				TBD		
Total		0	0	0	13	3	10

As of June 05, 2023

=== European Championship ===
Montenegro women's national volleyball team played nine times in the qualifiers for European Championship (2009, 2011, 2013, 2015, 2017, 2019, 2021, 2023, 2026), will take part in the main competition for the first time in 2026.

European Championship					Qualification		
Year	Pos.	Pld	W	L	Pld	W	L
(Poland) 2009	did not qualify				8	2	6
(Italy) (Serbia) 2011	did not qualify				6	0	6
(Germany) (Switzerland) 2013	did not qualify				6	0	6
(Netherlands) (Belgium) 2015	did not qualify				9	4	5
(Azerbaijan) (Georgia (country)) 2017	did not qualify				9	4	5
(Hungary) (Slovakia) (Poland) (Turkey) 2019	did not qualify				6	2	4
(Serbia) (Bulgaria) (Croatia) (Romania) 2021	did not qualify				6	2	4
(Belgium) (Italy) (Estonia) (Germany) 2023	did not qualify				6	2	4
(Azerbaijan) (Czech Republic) (Sweden) (Turkey) 2026	24th	5	0	5	4	3	1
(Slovakia) / (Spain) / (N/A) / (N/A) 2028	TBD						
Total		5	0	5	48	15	3

As of August 29, 2026

=== European League ===
Montenegro women's national volleyball team played six times in the CEV European League.

European League
Year	Pos.	Pld	W	L
(European Union) 2016	10th	6	2	4
(European Union) 2017	8th	6	2	4
(European Union) 2023	13th	8	5	3
(European Union) 2024	16th	5	4	1
(European Union) 2025	11th	6	1	5
(European Union) 2026	13th	6	3	3
Total		37	17	20

As of June 21, 2026

=== Games of the Small States of Europe ===
Montenegro women's national volleyball team played once on the Games of the Small States of Europe (2015) and won the gold medal.

Games of the Small States of Europe
Year	Pos.	Pld	W	L
(Iceland) 2015	1st place, gold medalist(s)	4	4	0
(Montenegro) 2019	1st place, gold medalist(s)	5	5	0
Total		9	9	0

As of September 22, 2019

== Senior team roster ==
In September 2016, a list of Montenegrin national team for European Championship qualifiers is revealed. On the list were next players:

Name	Birth	Position	Team
Evgenija Milivojević	1993	Setter	(Montenegro) Galeb Bar
Tamara Roganović	1994	Setter	(Serbia) TENT Obrenovac
Tatjana Bokan	1988	Outside-spiker	(Indonesia) PGN Popsivo
Jelena Cvijović	1992	Outside-spiker	(Romania) Penicilina Iași
Dragana Peruničić	1992	Outside-spiker	(France) Amiens LMVB
Danijela Džaković	1994	Outside-spiker	(Serbia) Jedinstvo Užice
Ksenija Ivanović	1986	Outside-spiker	(Azerbaijan) Telekom Baku
Nikoleta Perović	1994	Opposite	(Romania) Targu Mures
Katarina Budrak	1998	Opposite	(Montenegro) Morača Podgorica
Marija Milović	1989	Middle-blocker	(France) Stella Calais
Ana Otašević	1987	Middle-blocker	(Poland) Developres Rzeszów
Marija Sandić	1983	Middle-blocker	(France) Amiens LMVB
Melisa Cenović	1998	Libero	(Montenegro) Luka Bar

== Head coaches ==
From 2007, national team of Montenegro was led by four different head coaches.

Period	Coach	Score		
2007–2011	(Turkey) Nejat Sancak	14	2–12	9:36
2011–2014	(Montenegro) Vladimir Racković	14	2–12	11:28
2014–2016	(Montenegro) Vladimir Milačić	22	12–10	40:36
2016–2018	(Serbia) Dragan Nešić	21	7–14	26:46
2018–2022	(Montenegro) Nikola Masoničić	13	7–6	24:21
2022–2025	(Serbia) Milorad Krunić	14	7–7	27:21
2025-	(Montenegro) Jovo Caković			

== Official matches ==
Montenengro played its first official match at May 2008. There is a list of official matches of the Montenegro women's national volleyball team.

=== Opponents ===
Below is the list of performances of Montenegro women's national volleyball team against every single opponent.

Opponents' country	G	W	L	S
Austria	1	0	1	1-3
Azerbaijan	2	0	2	0-6
Belgium	2	0	2	0-6
Bosnia and Herzegovina	3	2	1	8-6
Bulgaria	3	0	3	1-9
Croatia	3	0	3	2-9
Czech Republic	4	0	4	1-12
Cyprus	1	1	0	3-2
Estonia	1	1	0	3-0
Faroe Islands	2	2	0	6-0
Finland	4	0	4	5-12
France	6	1	5	7-17
Georgia	6	6	0	18-0
Greece	5	0	5	3-15
Hungary	1	0	1	0-3
Iceland	4	4	0	12-0
Israel	3	0	3	1-9
Kosovo	3	3	0	9-1
Lithuania	2	2	0	6-1
Latvia	1	0	1	2-3
Liechtenstein	2	2	0	6-0
Luxembourg	2	2	0	6-0
North Macedonia	1	1	0	3-0
Portugal	3	1	2	5-6
Romania	3	1	2	3-7
San Marino	2	2	0	6-0
Norway	3	3	0	9-1
Slovakia	2	0	2	0-6
Slovenia	4	0	4	0-12
Spain	6	2	4	6-13
Switzerland	6	1	5	5-16
Turkey	3	0	3	0-9
Ukraine	4	0	4	0-12
OVERALL	98	37	61	137-197

Last update: September 22, 2023.

== See also ==
- List of official matches of the Montenegro women's national volleyball team
- Volleyball Federation of Montenegro (OSCG)
- Montenegrin women's volley league
