= Kosovo women's national volleyball team =

National sports team

Kosovo
- Nickname(s): Dardanet (Dardanians)
- Association: Federata e Volejbollit e Kosovës (FVK)
- Confederation: CEV
- Head coach: Lorik Ilazi
- FIVB ranking: 63 ▲9 (29 June 2025)

Uniforms
Home
- fvk-ks.org

The Kosovo women's national volleyball team (Albanian: Kombëtarja e volejbollit të femrave të Kosovës; Serbian: Женска одбојка репрезентација Косова, romanized: Ženska odbojka reprezentacija Kosova) represents Kosovo in international women's volleyball and is controlled by the Volleyball Federation of Kosovo.

== Competitive record ==
=== World Championship ===
| World Championship record | | | | | | | | | World Championship qualification record | | | | | |
| Year | Round | Pos | Matches | | Sets | | Points | | Matches | | Sets | | Points | |
| Year | Round | Pos | W | L | W | L | W | L | W | L | W | L | W | L |
|---|---|---|---|---|---|---|---|---|---|---|---|---|---|---|
| (Soviet Union) 1952 to (China) 1990 | Part of Yugoslavia | | | | | | | | | | | | | |
| (Brazil) 1994 to (Japan) 1998 | Part of Serbia and Montenegro | | | | | | | | | | | | | |
| (Germany) 2002 to (Italy) 2014 | Not a FIVB member | | | | | | | | | | | | | |
| (Japan) 2018 | Did not qualify | | | | | | | | 0 | 5 | 0 | 15 | 162 | 375 |
| (Netherlands) (Poland) 2022 | Did not qualify | | | | | | | | | | | | | |
| (Thailand) 2025 | Did not qualify | | | | | | | | | | | | | |
| (Canada) (United States) 2027 | To be determined | | | | | | | | To be determined | | | | | |
| (Philippines) 2029 | To be determined | | | | | | | | To be determined | | | | | |
| Total | — | 0/22 | 0 | 0 | 0 | 0 | 0 | 0 | 0 | 5 | 0 | 15 | 162 | 375 |

=== European Championship ===
| European Championship record | | | | | | | | | European Championship qualification record | | | | | |
| Year | Round | Pos | Matches | | Sets | | Points | | Matches | | Sets | | Points | |
| Year | Round | Pos | W | L | W | L | W | L | W | L | W | L | W | L |
|---|---|---|---|---|---|---|---|---|---|---|---|---|---|---|
| (Czechoslovakia) 1949 to (Italy) 1991 | Part of Yugoslavia | | | | | | | | | | | | | |
| (Czech Republic) 1993 to (Italy) 1999 | Part of Serbia and Montenegro | | | | | | | | | | | | | |
| (Bulgaria) 2001 to (Netherlands) (Belgium) 2015 | Not a CEV member | | | | | | | | | | | | | |
| (Azerbaijan) (Georgia (country)) 2017 | Could not enter | | | | | | | | | | | | | |
| (Slovakia) (Hungary) (Poland) (Turkey) 2019 | Could not enter | | | | | | | | | | | | | |
| (Serbia) (Bulgaria) (Croatia) (Romania) 2021 | Did not qualify | | | | | | | | 0 | 6 | 1 | 18 | 316 | 465 |
| (Belgium) (Estonia) (Germany) (Italy) 2023 | Could not enter | | | | | | | | | | | | | |
| (Azerbaijan) (Czech Republic) (Sweden) (Turkey) 2026 | Did not qualify | | | | | | | | 0 | 4 | 0 | 0 | 165 | 300 |
| Total | — | 0/32 | 0 | 0 | 0 | 0 | 0 | 0 | 0 | 10 | 1 | 18 | 481 | 765 |

== Fixtures and results ==
=== 2021 ===
| Date | Time | | Score | | Set 1 | Set 2 | Set 3 | Set 4 | Set 5 | Total | Report |
2021 Women's European Volleyball Championship qualifications
| 7 May | 20:00 | Montenegro | 3–0 | Kosovo | 25–21 | 25–14 | 26–24 | – | – | 76–59 | Report |
| 8 May | 17:00 | Slovakia | 3–0 | Kosovo | 25–15 | 25–17 | 25–16 | – | – | 75–48 | Report |
| 9 May | 17:00 | Kosovo | 0–3 | Finland | 15–25 | 10–25 | 15–25 | – | – | 40–75 | Report |
| 13 May | 20:30 | Kosovo | 0–3 | Finland | 9–25 | 16–25 | 14–25 | – | – | 39–75 | Report |
| 14 May | 20:30 | Slovakia | 3–0 | Kosovo | 25–23 | 25–11 | 25–17 | – | – | 75–51 | Report |
| 15 May | 17:30 | Montenegro | 3–1 | Kosovo | 25–19 | 14–25 | 25–21 | 25–14 | – | 89–79 | Report |

== Current squad ==
The following players were called up for the 2021 Women's European Volleyball Championship qualifications.

| No. | Pos. | Name | Date of birth | Height | Weight | Club |
|---|---|---|---|---|---|---|
| 1 | SET | Zyla Kadriu | 18 June 2001 (age 24) | 1.74 m (5 ft 9 in) | 59 kg (130 lb) | (United States) Northwood Timberwolves |
| 2 | MB | Bleona Kadriu | 7 April 1999 (age 26) | 1.82 m (6 ft 0 in) | 66 kg (146 lb) | (Kosovo) Skenderaj |
| 4 | MB | Elvira Bajraktari | 31 March 1999 (age 26) | 1.87 m (6 ft 2 in) | 80 kg (180 lb) | (Kosovo) Drita |
| 5 | MB | Valmire Ramadani | 5 May 1998 (age 27) | 1.74 m (5 ft 9 in) | 66 kg (146 lb) | (Kosovo) Drita |
| 6 | SET | Blinera Jaha | 31 January 1998 (age 28) | 1.71 m (5 ft 7 in) | 72 kg (159 lb) | (Kosovo) Drita |
| 7 | OH | Venera Kadriu | 17 March 2000 (age 25) | 1.76 m (5 ft 9 in) | 62 kg (137 lb) | (United States) Northwood Timberwolves |
| 8 | OH | Egzona Geci | 7 April 1992 (age 33) | 1.76 m (5 ft 9 in) | 67 kg (148 lb) | (Kosovo) Skenderaj |
| 9 | OH | Loresa Avdyli | 2 November 2001 (age 24) | 1.82 m (6 ft 0 in) | 65 kg (143 lb) | (Kosovo) M-Technologie |
| 10 | OPP | Dhurata Sylejmani | 9 March 1999 (age 26) | 1.86 m (6 ft 1 in) | 71 kg (157 lb) | (Kosovo) Drita |
| 11 | OH | Adelajda Prenga-Ilazi (C) | 5 March 1991 (age 34) | 1.73 m (5 ft 8 in) | 62 kg (137 lb) | (Kosovo) Drita |
| 12 | LIB | Fjolla Hyseni | 12 May 1997 (age 28) | 1.69 m (5 ft 7 in) | 61 kg (134 lb) | (Kosovo) Drita |
| 13 | LIB | Linda Selmani | 28 July 1999 (age 26) | 1.69 m (5 ft 7 in) | 57 kg (126 lb) | (Kosovo) M-Technologie |
| 14 | MB | Leonita Hoxha | 12 July 1999 (age 26) | 1.85 m (6 ft 1 in) | 70 kg (150 lb) | (Kosovo) Prishtina |
| 19 | OH | Lorina Mehmeti | 20 November 1999 (age 26) | 1.71 m (5 ft 7 in) | 70 kg (150 lb) | (Kosovo) Drita |

=== Current coaching staff ===
| Position | Name |
|---|---|
| Head coach | (Kosovo) Lorik Ilazi |
Assistant coach(es)
| Assistant coach(es) | (Kosovo) Ylli Kadriu |
| Assistant coach(es) | (Albania) Amarilda Prenga-Sijoni |
| Team director | (Kosovo) Agron Istogu |
