= 2023 Women's European Volleyball League =

European volleyball tournament

2023 Women's European Golden League
- Dates: 27 May – 9 July
- Teams: 9

Final positions
- Champions: Ukraine (2nd title)
- Runners-up: Sweden

Tournament awards
- MVP: (Ukraine) Anastasiia Kraiduba

Tournament statistics
- Matches played: 24
- Attendance: 27,537 (1,147 per match)

2023 Women's European Volleyball League
Tournament details
- Host country: Austria
- Dates: 27 May – 25 June
- Teams: 8
- Runners-up: Austria
- Third place: Portugal
- Fourth place: Montenegro

Tournament statistics
- Matches played: 28
- Attendance: 17,943 (641 per match)

The 2023 Women's European Volleyball League was the 14th edition of the annual Women's European Volleyball League, which featured women's national volleyball teams from 17 European countries. The Golden Leagues final phase will feature semi-finals and finals played as a home and away game. The winner and the runner-up qualified to the 2023 Challenger Cup

The tournament had two divisions: the Golden League, which featured nine teams, and the Silver League, which featured eight teams.

== Pools composition ==
Teams were seeded following the Serpentine system according to their European Ranking for national teams as of January 2023. Rankings are shown in brackets.

=== Golden league ===
Pool A	Pool B	Pool C
Belgium (7)	Czech Republic (10)	France (11)
Bosnia and Herzegovina (16)	Slovakia (15)	Ukraine (13)
Sweden (17)	Romania (21)	Hungary (22)

=== Silver league ===
Pool A	Pool B
Austria (24)	Montenegro (27)
Estonia (30)	Portugal (28)
Latvia (33)	Georgia (34)
North Macedonia (-)	Faroe Islands (37)

== Pool standing procedure ==
1. Total number of victories (matches won, matches lost)
2. In the event of a tie, the following first tiebreaker will apply: The teams will be ranked by the most point gained per match as follows:
  - Match won 3–0 or 3–1: 3 points for the winner, 0 points for the loser
  - Match won 3–2: 2 points for the winner, 1 point for the loser
  - Match forfeited: 3 points for the winner, 0 points (0–25, 0–25, 0–25) for the loser
3. If teams are still tied after examining the number of victories and points gained, then the FIVB will examine the results in order to break the tie in the following order:
  - Set quotient: if two or more teams are tied on the number of points gained, they will be ranked by the quotient resulting from the division of the number of all set won by the number of all sets lost.
  - Points quotient: if the tie persists based on the set quotient, the teams will be ranked by the quotient resulting from the division of all points scored by the total of points lost during all sets.
  - If the tie persists based on the point quotient, the tie will be broken based on the team that won the match of the Round Robin Phase between the tied teams. When the tie in point quotient is between three or more teams, these teams ranked taking into consideration only the matches involving the teams in question.

== League round ==
- All times are local.

=== Golden league ===
==== Pool A ====
Pos	Team	Pld	W	L	Pts	SW	SL	SR	SPW	SPL	SPR	Qualification
1	Belgium	4	3	1	9	10	4	2.500	334	286	1.168	Golden league Final round
2	Sweden	4	3	1	8	10	7	1.429	380	364	1.044	Golden league Final round
3	Bosnia and Herzegovina	4	0	4	1	3	12	0.250	287	351	0.818	

Source: CEV

Date	Time		Score		Set 1	Set 2	Set 3	Set 4	Set 5	Total	Report
27 May	20:00	Belgium	3–0	Bosnia and Herzegovina	25–17	25–18	25–17			75–52	Report
31 May	18:00	Sweden	3–1	Bosnia and Herzegovina	25–22	26–24	22–25	25–22		98–93	Report
3 Jun	17:00	Belgium	3–1	Sweden	25–22	25–14	20–25	25–17		95–78	Report
10 Jun	17:00	Bosnia and Herzegovina	2–3	Sweden	25–21	25–17	13–25	16–25	8–15	87–103	Report
14 Jun	18:00	Bosnia and Herzegovina	0–3	Belgium	23–25	14–25	18–25			55–75	Report
17 Jun	16:00	Sweden	3–1	Belgium	25–23	26–28	25–23	25–15		101–89	Report

==== Pool B ====
Pos	Team	Pld	W	L	Pts	SW	SL	SR	SPW	SPL	SPR	Qualification
1	Czech Republic	4	3	1	9	10	5	2.000	344	303	1.135	Golden league Final round
2	Slovakia	4	2	2	6	7	8	0.875	314	333	0.943	
3	Romania	4	1	3	3	6	10	0.600	338	360	0.939	

Source: CEV

Date	Time		Score		Set 1	Set 2	Set 3	Set 4	Set 5	Total	Report
27 May	17:00	Romania	1–3	Slovakia	22–25	12–25	25–19	18–25		77–94	Report
31 May	16:00	Czech Republic	3–1	Slovakia	25–16	22–25	25–20	25–11		97–72	Report
3 Jun	16:00	Czech Republic	1–3	Romania	17–25	25–15	18–25	18–25		78–90	Report
8 Jun	17:00	Romania	1–3	Czech Republic	25–16	23–25	26–28	13–25		87–94	Report
14 Jun	20:00	Slovakia	0–3	Czech Republic	15–25	20–25	19–25			54–75	Report
17 Jun	19:00	Slovakia	3–1	Romania	25–18	25–18	19–25	25–23		94–84	Report

==== Pool C ====
Pos	Team	Pld	W	L	Pts	SW	SL	SR	SPW	SPL	SPR	Qualification
1	Ukraine	4	3	1	9	10	6	1.667	369	333	1.108	Golden league Final round
2	France	4	2	2	6	8	8	1.000	349	348	1.003	
3	Hungary	4	1	3	3	6	10	0.600	339	376	0.902	

Source: CEV

Date	Time		Score		Set 1	Set 2	Set 3	Set 4	Set 5	Total	Report
27 May	19:00	Hungary	1–3	Ukraine	25–22	25–27	9–25	23–25		82–99	Report
28 May	17:30	Ukraine	3–1	Hungary	25–17	22–25	25–15	26–24		98–81	Report
4 Jun	15:00	France	1–3	Hungary	20–25	25–19	22–25	23–25		90–94	Report
10 Jun	19:00	Hungary	1–3	France	20–25	25–14	15–25	22–25		82–89	Report
14 Jun	19:00	Ukraine	3–1	France	25–21	25–17	17–25	25–11		92–74	Report
18 Jun	15:00	France	3–1	Ukraine	25–18	21–25	25–16	25–21		96–80	Report

==== Ranking of the second placed teams ====
Pos	Team	Pld	W	L	Pts	SW	SL	SR	SPW	SPL	SPR	Qualification
1	Sweden	4	3	1	8	10	7	1.429	380	364	1.044	Golden league Final round
2	France	4	2	2	6	8	8	1.000	349	348	1.003	
3	Slovakia	4	2	2	6	7	8	0.875	314	333	0.943	

Source: CEV

=== Silver league ===
==== Pool A ====
Pos	Team	Pld	W	L	Pts	SW	SL	SR	SPW	SPL	SPR	Qualification
1	Estonia	6	5	1	15	15	4	3.750	454	368	1.234	Silver league Final round
2	Austria	6	5	1	15	15	5	3.000	452	391	1.156	Silver league Final round
3	Latvia	6	2	4	6	9	12	0.750	469	475	0.987	
4	North Macedonia	6	0	6	0	0	18	0.000	315	456	0.691	

Source: CEV

Date	Time		Score		Set 1	Set 2	Set 3	Set 4	Set 5	Total	Report
27 May	17:00	Estonia	3–1	Latvia	20–25	25–21	25–16	25–21		95–83	Report
27 May	20:15	North Macedonia	0–3	Austria	15–25	20–25	15–25			50–75	Report
31 May	17:00	Estonia	3–0	Austria	25–15	25–8	25–23			75–46	Report
31 May	17:30	North Macedonia	0–3	Latvia	23–25	18–25	18–25			59–75	Report
3 Jun	14:00	Austria	3–1	Latvia	25–23	16–25	25–15	25–23		91–86	Report
3 Jun	17:30	North Macedonia	0–3	Estonia	10–25	14–25	20–25			44–75	Report
10 Jun	16:00	Estonia	3–0	North Macedonia	25–22	25–20	25–16			75–58	Report
10 Jun	16:00	Latvia	1–3	Austria	25–15	17–25	21–25	19–25		82–90	Report
14 Jun	17:00	Latvia	3–0	North Macedonia	25–19	25–17	31–29			81–65	Report
14 Jun	20:15	Austria	3–0	Estonia	25–20	25–19	25–20			75–59	Report
17 Jun	17:00	Austria	3–0	North Macedonia	25–15	25–17	25–7			75–39	Report
17 Jun	17:00	Latvia	0–3	Estonia	16–25	23–25	23–25			62–75	Report

==== Pool B ====
Pos	Team	Pld	W	L	Pts	SW	SL	SR	SPW	SPL	SPR	Qualification
1	Montenegro	6	5	1	15	16	3	5.333	451	328	1.375	Silver league Final round
2	Portugal	6	5	1	15	15	4	3.750	461	310	1.487	Silver league Final round
3	Georgia	6	1	5	3	4	15	0.267	345	439	0.786	
4	Faroe Islands	6	1	5	3	3	16	0.188	283	463	0.611	

Source: CEV

Date	Time		Score		Set 1	Set 2	Set 3	Set 4	Set 5	Total	Report
27 May	18:00	Faroe Islands	0–3	Montenegro	9–25	7–25	20–25			36–75	Report
28 May	17:00	Portugal	3–0	Georgia	25–13	25–12	25–18			75–43	Report
31 May	15:00	Portugal	3–1	Montenegro	25–17	20–25	25–18	25–16		95–76	Report
31 May	19:00	Faroe Islands	3–1	Georgia	25–19	22–25	25–22	25–22		97–88	Report
3 Jun	20:00	Montenegro	3–0	Georgia	25–19	25–9	25–16			75–44	Report
4 Jun	16:00	Faroe Islands	0–3	Portugal	10–25	11–25	8–25			29–75	Report
10 Jun	17:00	Georgia	0–3	Montenegro	14–25	11–25	14–25			39–75	Report
11 Jun	16:00	Portugal	3–0	Faroe Islands	25–9	25–13	25–9			75–31	Report
14 Jun	17:00	Georgia	3–0	Faroe Islands	25–15	25–12	25–15			75–42	Report
14 Jun	20:00	Montenegro	3–0	Portugal	25–21	25–23	25–22			75–66	Report
16 Jun	20:00	Montenegro	3–0	Faroe Islands	25–23	25–17	25–8			75–48	Report
17 Jun	16:00	Georgia	0–3	Portugal	18–25	17–25	21–25			56–75	Report

== Final round ==
- All times are local.

=== Golden league ===
Semifinals
Ukraine	3	3
Czech Republic	0	1
Sweden	3	3
Belgium	2	0

Final
Ukraine	3	3
Sweden	0	0

==== Semifinals ====
Date	Time		Score		Set 1	Set 2	Set 3	Set 4	Set 5	Total	Report
25 Jun	18:00	Ukraine	3–0	Czech Republic	25–22	25–23	25–17			75–62	Report
25 Jun	15:00	Sweden	3–2	Belgium	24–26	25–16	16–25	25–17	18–16	108–100	Report
28 Jun	18:00	Czech Republic	1–3	Ukraine	25–22	11–25	22–25	16–25		74–97	Report
28 Jun	20:00	Belgium	0–3	Sweden	20–25	26–28	17–25			63–78	Report

==== Final ====
Date	Time		Score		Set 1	Set 2	Set 3	Set 4	Set 5	Total	Report
6 Jul	18:00	Ukraine	3–0	Sweden	25–15	25–20	25–19			75–54	Report
9 Jul	16:00	Sweden	0–3	Ukraine	17–25	22–25	30–32			69–82	Report

=== Silver league ===
Semifinals
24 June
Portugal	1
Estonia	3
24 June
Austria	3
Montenegro	1

Final
25 June
Estonia	3
Austria	2
3rd place match
25 June
Portugal	3
Montenegro	1

==== Semifinals ====
Date	Time		Score		Set 1	Set 2	Set 3	Set 4	Set 5	Total	Report
24 Jun	15:00	Portugal	1–3	Estonia	27–29	22–25	25–18	24–26		98–98	Report
24 Jun	20:20	Austria	3–1	Montenegro	25–21	23–25	25–23	25–14		98–83	Report

==== Third-place match ====
Date	Time		Score		Set 1	Set 2	Set 3	Set 4	Set 5	Total	Report
25 Jun	17:35	Portugal	3–1	Montenegro	23–25	25–21	25–20	25–23		98–89	Report

==== Final ====
Date	Time		Score		Set 1	Set 2	Set 3	Set 4	Set 5	Total	Report
25 Jun	20:20	Estonia	3–2	Austria	31–33	25–11	13–25	25–12	15–12	109–93	Report

== Final standing ==
Rank	Team
1st place, gold medalist(s)	Ukraine
2nd place, silver medalist(s)	Sweden
3rd place, bronze medalist(s)	Belgium
3rd place, bronze medalist(s)	Czech Republic
5	France
6	Slovakia
7	Romania
8	Hungary
9	Bosnia and Herzegovina
10	Estonia
11	Austria
12	Portugal
13	Montenegro
14	Latvia
15	Georgia
16	Faroe Islands
17	North Macedonia

Qualified for the 2023 Challenger Cup
Qualified for the 2023 Challenger Cup as hosts

2023 European League champions

Ukraine
2nd title

== See also ==
- 2023 Men's European Volleyball League
