= Volleyball at the 2015 Games of the Small States of Europe =

The volleyball competition at the 2015 Games of the Small States of Europe took place from 2–6 June 2015 at the Laugardalshöll Sportshall. in Reykjavík. The beach volleyball competition took place in a specially constructed stadium outside the Sportshall.

== Medal table ==
| Rank | Nation | Gold | Silver | Bronze | Total |
|---|---|---|---|---|---|
| 1 | Iceland (ISL) | 1 | 1 | 1 | 3 |
| 2 | Andorra (AND) | 1 | 0 | 0 | 1 |
| 2 | Luxembourg (LUX) | 1 | 0 | 0 | 1 |
| 2 | Montenegro (MNE) | 1 | 0 | 0 | 1 |
| 5 | Liechtenstein (LIE) | 0 | 2 | 0 | 2 |
| 6 | San Marino (SMR) | 0 | 1 | 1 | 2 |
| 7 | Cyprus (CYP) | 0 | 0 | 1 | 1 |
| 7 | Monaco (MON) | 0 | 0 | 1 | 1 |
| Totals (8 entries) | | 4 | 4 | 4 | 12 |

== Medalists ==
| Event | Gold | Silver | Bronze |
|---|---|---|---|
| Men's indoor | Luxembourg; Kamil Rychlicki; Olivier De Castro; Gilles Braas; Chris Zuidberg; Arnaud Maroldt; Steve Weber; Jan Lux; Ralf Lentz; Tim Laevaert; Dominik Husi; Charles Hoffmann; Robert Tomsicek | Iceland; Alexander Stefánsson; Andris Orlovs; Lúðvík Már Matthíasson; Theódór Óskar Þorvaldsson; Ævarr Freyr Birgisson; Valgeir Valgeirsson; Kristján Valdimarsson; Hafsteinn Valdimarsson; Róbert Karl Hlöðversson; Matthías Haraldsson; Filip Pawel Szewczyk; Kjartan Fannar Grétarsson | San Marino; Alessandro Gennari; Marco Rondelli; Paolo Crociani; Emanuele Cervellini; Matteo Zonzini; David Zonzini; Andrea Lazzarini; Giuliano Vanucci; Joshua Kessler; Federico Tentoni; Francesco Tabarini; Ivan Stefanelli |
| Women's indoor | Montenegro; Marija Sandic; Dragana Perunicic; Danijela Dzakovic; Nikoleta Perovic; Jelena Cvijovic; Ana Otasevic; Melisa Cenovic; Marija Milovic; Tatjana Bokan; Marija Bojovic; Ivona Vojvodic; Elza Hadzisalihovic | San Marino; Samanta Giardi; Elisa Ridolfi; Allegra Piscaglia; Elisa Parenti; Chiara Parenti; Giulia Muccioli; Anita Magalotti; Valeria Benvenuti; Veronica Barducci; Cristina Bacciocchi; Elisa Vanucci; Rachele Stimac | Iceland; Karen Gunnarsdóttir; Fríða Sigurðardóttir; Nataliya Alekseevna Gomzina; Laufey Björk Sigmundsdóttir; Hjördís Eiríksdóttir; Erla Rán Eiríksdóttir; Birta Björnsdóttir; Miglena Apostolova; Jóna Guðlaug Vigfúsdóttir; Kristina Apostolova; Fjóla Rut Svavarsdóttir; Thelma Dögg Grétarsdóttir |
| Men's beach | Andorra; Genildo Cassiano; Da Silva Prada | Liechtenstein; Manuel Gahr; Maximilian von Deichmann | Cyprus; Dimitris Apostolou; Vladimir Knezevic |
| Women's beach | Iceland; Elísabet Einarsdóttir; Berglind Jónsdóttir | Liechtenstein; Petra Schifferle-Walser; Claudia Hasler | Monaco; Caroline Revel; Magali Muratore |
