= Norway women's national volleyball team =

Women's national volleyball team representing Norway

Norway
- Association: Norwegian Volleyball Federation
- Confederation: CEV
- FIVB ranking: NR (29 June 2025)

Uniforms
Home	Away	Third

Summer Olympics
- Appearances: No Appearances

World Championship
- Appearances: No Appearances

The Norway women's national volleyball team represents Norway in international women's volleyball competitions and friendly matches and it is ruled and managed by the Norwegian Volleyball Federation. Federation is a member of Federation of International Volleyball or FIVB and also a part of European Volleyball Confederation or CEV. However Norway has not made any international appearances in major competitions so far. They often participate in European Qualifications Tournament, also since Norway follow the NEVZA volleyball body for northern European countries, they play exhibition matches against these body members teams.

== Results ==
=== Summer Olympics ===
Champions Runners up Third place Fourth place

Summer Olympics record
Year	Round	Position	Pld	W	L	SW	SL	Squad
(Japan) 1964 to (France) 2024	did not qualify							
(United States) 2028	to be determined							
(Australia) 2032	to be determined							
Total	0 Titles	0/18						

=== World Championship ===
Champions Runners up Third place Fourth place

World Championship record
Year	Round	Position	Pld	W	L	SW	SL	Squad
(Soviet Union) 1952 to (Thailand) 2025	did not enter or qualify							
(Canada) (United States) 2027	to be determined							
(Philippines) 2029	to be determined							
Total	0 Titles	0/22						

=== European Championship ===
Champions Runners-up Third place 4th place

European Championship Qualifying Tournament
Year	Round	Position	Pld	W	L	SW	SL	Squad
2013	did not enter							
2015	First Round	3rd Group Place	3	1	2	5	6	
2017	First Round	3rd Group Place	3	1	2	3	8	
2019	Pool C	4th Group Place	6	0	6	2	18	
2021	Pool C	4th Place	6	0	6	0	18	
2023	Pool F	4th Place	6	0	6	0	18	
2026	did not enter							
Total	0 Titles	5/27	24	2	22	10	68	

== Team ==
=== Previous squad ===
The following is the Norwegian roster for the 2023 European Championship qualifiers.

Head Coach Eelco Beijl

#	Name	Position	Height	Weight	Birthday	Spike	Block
3	JULIEBØ Jenny Fløystad	Opposite	178		2000	287	270
7	THELLE Julia Solgaard	Outside spiker	178		2003	295	274
11	HÅKSTAD Aurora	Outside spiker	181	60	5 September 1992	290	270
9	FAUSKE Karoline	Outside spiker	178		2004	292	285
1	KJOSÅS Mille Solvik	Middle blocker	178	60	26 August 1999	300	275
13	ISACHSEN Eiril Jensen	Setter	180		2003	298	278
10	LAVICKYTE Liepa	Opposite	183	60	28 November 2003	312	285
8	JOHANSEN Wilde Jakobsen	Outside spiker	177		2001	312	290
14	ÅSMUL Maria	Setter	177		2002	291	276
6	SØRBØ Live	Setter	174	60	28 November 2000	286	268
4	STEEN KNUDSEN Ragni	Outside spiker	180	60	3 October 1995	305	290
5	GILJE Martine Clementsen	Libero	171		1998	285	265
15	BENNINGHOFF Siri Hustveit	Libero	171		2003	277	262
16	GUNDERSEN Marte Solheim	Libero	172		2000	280	270
0	MIKAELSEN Julie Heile	Opposite	189		1 January 1990	305	295
