= 2017 Women's European Volleyball Championship =

Tournament details
- Host countries: Azerbaijan; Georgia
- Dates: 22 September – 1 October
- Teams: 16
- Venue: 3 (in 3 host cities)

Final positions
- Champions: Serbia (2nd title)

Tournament awards
- MVP: (Serbia) Tijana Bošković

Tournament statistics
- Matches played: 36

The 2017 Women's European Volleyball Championship was the 30th edition of the European Volleyball Championship, organised by Europe's governing volleyball body, the Confédération Européenne de Volleyball. The tournament was co-hosted by Azerbaijan and Georgia, and was held between 22 September and 1 October 2017.

Serbia defeated Netherlands in the final to capture their second European title. Turkey defeated Azerbaijan for the bronze medal. Tijana Bošković from Serbia was elected the MVP.

== Qualification ==
Means of qualification	Qualifier
Host Country	Azerbaijan
Host Country	Georgia
2015 European Championship	Russia
2015 European Championship	Netherlands
2015 European Championship	Serbia
2015 European Championship	Turkey
2015 European Championship	Germany

Means of qualification		Qualifier
Second Round Winners	Pool A	Italy
Second Round Winners	Pool B	Belgium
Second Round Winners	Pool C	Poland
Second Round Winners	Pool D	Croatia
Second Round Winners	Pool E	Bulgaria
Second Round Winners	Pool F	Belarus
Third Round Winners		Hungary
Third Round Winners		Czech Republic
Third Round Winners		Ukraine

Total 16

== Format ==
The tournament is played in two different stages. In the first stage, the sixteen participants are divided in four groups of four teams each. A single round-robin format is played within each group to determine the teams' group position (as per criteria below). The three best teams of each group (total of 12 teams) progress to the second stage, with group winners advancing to the quarterfinals while second and third placed teams advancing to the playoffs.

=== Pool standing criteria ===
1. Number of matches won
2. Match points
3. Sets ratio
4. Points ratio
5. Result of the match between the tied teams

Match won 3–0 or 3–1: 3 match points for the winner, 0 match points for the loser
Match won 3–2: 2 match points for the winner, 1 match point for the loser

The second stage of the tournament consists of a single-elimination, with winners advancing to the next round. First, the playoff is played (involving groups second and third places) to determine which teams will join the group winners in the quarterfinals, followed by semifinals, 3rd place match and final.

== Pools composition ==
Pool A	Pool B	Pool C	Pool D
Azerbaijan	Georgia	Russia	Serbia
Germany	Italy	Turkey	Netherlands
Poland	Croatia	Bulgaria	Belgium
Hungary	Belarus	Ukraine	Czech Republic

== Venues ==
Three venues (each in a different city) were selected to be used in the tournament. Two located in Azerbaijan (at Baku and Ganja) and one in Georgia (at Tbilisi).

Pools A, C and Championship round	Pool D	Host cities in Azerbaijan
Baku, Azerbaijan	Ganja, Azerbaijan	Host cities in Azerbaijan
National Gymnastics Arena	Göygöl Olympic Sport Complex	Host cities in Azerbaijan
Capacity: 9,000	Capacity: 900	Host cities in Azerbaijan
Pool B		Host cities in Georgia
(Georgia (country)) Tbilisi, Georgia		Host cities in Georgia
Tbilisi Sports Palace		Host cities in Georgia
Capacity: 9,700		Host cities in Georgia

== Preliminary round ==
All times are Azerbaijan Time (AZT) / Georgia Time (GET) (UTC+04:00).

=== Pool A ===
- venue: National Gymnastics Arena, Baku, Azerbaijan

Pos	Team	Pld	W	L	Pts	SW	SL	SR	SPW	SPL	SPR	Qualification
1	Azerbaijan (H)	3	3	0	9	9	1	9.000	244	191	1.277	Quarterfinals
2	Poland	3	2	1	5	6	6	1.000	258	250	1.032	Playoffs
3	Germany	3	1	2	4	6	7	0.857	267	285	0.937	Playoffs
4	Hungary	3	0	3	0	2	9	0.222	220	263	0.837	

Source: CEV
(H) Host

Date	Time		Score		Set 1	Set 2	Set 3	Set 4	Set 5	Total	Report
22 Sep	18:00	Hungary	0–3	Azerbaijan	23–25	14–25	16–25			53–75	Report
22 Sep	20:30	Poland	3–2	Germany	23–25	25–15	18–25	25–23	15–5	106–93	Report
23 Sep	18:00	Poland	3–1	Hungary	25–22	19–25	25–17	25–18		94–82	Report
24 Sep	18:00	Azerbaijan	3–0	Poland	25–14	25–21	25–23			75–58	Report
24 Sep	20:30	Germany	3–1	Hungary	25–21	19–25	25–21	25–18		94–85	Report
25 Sep	18:00	Germany	1–3	Azerbaijan	25–19	19–25	18–25	18–25		80–94	Report

=== Pool B ===
- venue: Tbilisi Sports Palace, Tbilisi, Georgia

Pos	Team	Pld	W	L	Pts	SW	SL	SR	SPW	SPL	SPR	Qualification
1	Italy	3	3	0	8	9	3	3.000	264	232	1.138	Quarterfinals
2	Belarus	3	2	1	5	7	5	1.400	254	226	1.124	Playoffs
3	Croatia	3	1	2	5	7	7	1.000	303	257	1.179	Playoffs
4	Georgia (H)	3	0	3	0	1	9	0.111	142	248	0.573	

Source: CEV
(H) Host

Date	Time		Score		Set 1	Set 2	Set 3	Set 4	Set 5	Total	Report
22 Sep	17:00	Italy	3–0	Georgia	25–14	25–12	25–12			75–38	Report
22 Sep	20:00	Belarus	3–2	Croatia	10–25	15–25	25–21	25–20	15–9	90–100	Report
23 Sep	17:00	Georgia	1–3	Croatia	12–25	13–25	25–23	23–25		73–98	Report
23 Sep	20:00	Italy	3–1	Belarus	27–25	25–18	18–25	25–21		95–89	Report
24 Sep	17:00	Georgia	0–3	Belarus	8–25	11–25	12–25			31–75	Report
24 Sep	20:00	Croatia	2–3	Italy	23–25	21–25	25–19	25–10	11–15	105–94	Report

=== Pool C ===
- venue: National Gymnastics Arena, Baku, Azerbaijan

Pos	Team	Pld	W	L	Pts	SW	SL	SR	SPW	SPL	SPR	Qualification
1	Russia	3	3	0	7	9	5	1.800	312	299	1.043	Quarterfinals
2	Bulgaria	3	2	1	5	8	7	1.143	313	298	1.050	Playoffs
3	Turkey	3	1	2	4	6	7	0.857	287	282	1.018	Playoffs
4	Ukraine	3	0	3	2	5	9	0.556	279	312	0.894	

Source: CEV

Date	Time		Score		Set 1	Set 2	Set 3	Set 4	Set 5	Total	Report
22 Sep	15:30	Ukraine	2–3	Russia	18–25	25–20	23–25	25–23	13–15	104–108	Report
23 Sep	15:30	Bulgaria	3–2	Ukraine	25–23	21–25	23–25	25–11	15–4	109–88	Report
23 Sep	20:30	Turkey	1–3	Russia	23–25	25–20	23–25	20–25		91–95	Report
24 Sep	15:30	Bulgaria	3–2	Turkey	25–17	10–25	25–16	20–25	20–18	100–101	Report
25 Sep	15:30	Russia	3–2	Bulgaria	21–25	25–20	23–25	25–21	15–13	109–104	Report
25 Sep	20:30	Turkey	3–1	Ukraine	25–20	25–19	20–25	25–23		95–87	Report

=== Pool D ===
- venue: Göygöl Olympic Sport Complex, Ganja, Azerbaijan

Pos	Team	Pld	W	L	Pts	SW	SL	SR	SPW	SPL	SPR	Qualification
1	Serbia	3	3	0	9	9	1	9.000	253	217	1.166	Quarterfinals
2	Netherlands	3	2	1	6	6	5	1.200	261	234	1.115	Playoffs
3	Czech Republic	3	1	2	3	4	7	0.571	241	264	0.913	Playoffs
4	Belgium	3	0	3	0	3	9	0.333	254	294	0.864	

Source: CEV

Date	Time		Score		Set 1	Set 2	Set 3	Set 4	Set 5	Total	Report
22 Sep	17:00	Serbia	3–0	Czech Republic	25–22	25–16	25–23			75–61	Report
22 Sep	20:00	Netherlands	3–1	Belgium	23–25	25–12	25–21	25–14		98–72	Report
23 Sep	17:00	Czech Republic	3–1	Belgium	19–25	25–23	28–26	25–19		97–93	Report
23 Sep	20:00	Serbia	3–0	Netherlands	29–27	25–17	25–23			79–67	Report
24 Sep	17:00	Belgium	1–3	Serbia	26–24	20–25	22–25	21–25		89–99	Report
24 Sep	20:00	Czech Republic	1–3	Netherlands	21–25	15–25	25–21	22–25		83–96	Report

== Championship round ==
All times are Azerbaijan Time (AZT) (UTC+04:00).

- venue: National Gymnastics Arena, Baku, Azerbaijan

=== Bracket ===
Playoffs
26 September–Baku
Netherlands	3
Croatia	0
27 September–Baku
Bulgaria	2
Germany	3
26 September–Baku
Belarus	3
Czech Republic	2
27 September–Baku
Poland	1
Turkey	3

Quarterfinals
28 September–Baku
Italy	0
Netherlands	3
29 September–Baku
Azerbaijan	3
Germany	0
28 September–Baku
Serbia	3
Belarus	0
29 September–Baku
Russia	0
Turkey	3

Semifinals
30 September–Baku
Netherlands	3
Azerbaijan	2
30 September–Baku
Serbia	3
Turkey	0

Final
1 October–Baku
Netherlands	1
Serbia	3
Third place game
1 October–Baku
Azerbaijan	1
Turkey	3

=== Playoffs ===
Date	Time		Score		Set 1	Set 2	Set 3	Set 4	Set 5	Total	Report
26 Sep	18:00	Belarus	3–2	Czech Republic	18–25	23–25	27–25	25–22	17–15	110–112	Report
26 Sep	20:30	Netherlands	3–0	Croatia	25–18	25–8	25–21			75–47	Report
27 Sep	18:00	Poland	1–3	Turkey	22–25	25–27	25–18	23–25		95–95	Report
27 Sep	20:30	Bulgaria	2–3	Germany	25–14	20–25	25–16	19–25	11–15	100–95	Report

=== Quarterfinals ===
Date	Time		Score		Set 1	Set 2	Set 3	Set 4	Set 5	Total	Report
28 Sep	18:00	Italy	0–3	Netherlands	17–25	20–25	13–25			50–75	Report
28 Sep	20:30	Serbia	3–0	Belarus	25–19	25–12	25–14			75–45	Report
29 Sep	18:00	Azerbaijan	3–0	Germany	25–20	25–18	25–21			75–59	Report
29 Sep	20:30	Russia	0–3	Turkey	25–27	18–25	20–25			63–77	Report

=== Semifinals ===
Date	Time		Score		Set 1	Set 2	Set 3	Set 4	Set 5	Total	Report
30 Sep	18:00	Netherlands	3–2	Azerbaijan	20–25	25–19	25–19	25–27	15–12	110–102	Report
30 Sep	20:30	Serbia	3–0	Turkey	25–17	25–12	25–21			75–50	Report

=== Third place game ===
Date	Time		Score		Set 1	Set 2	Set 3	Set 4	Set 5	Total	Report
1 Oct	16:00	Azerbaijan	1–3	Turkey	25–22	21–25	14–25	8–25		68–97	Report

=== Final ===
Date	Time		Score		Set 1	Set 2	Set 3	Set 4	Set 5	Total	Report
1 Oct	19:00	Netherlands	1–3	Serbia	20–25	22–25	25–18	18–25		85–93	Report

== Final standing ==
Qualified to 2019 Women's EuroVolley
Qualified to 2019 Women's EuroVolley as host countries

Rank	Team
1st place, gold medalist(s)	Serbia
2nd place, silver medalist(s)	Netherlands
3rd place, bronze medalist(s)	Turkey
4	Azerbaijan
5	Italy
6	Russia
7	Belarus
8	Germany
9	Bulgaria
10	Poland
11	Croatia
12	Czech Republic
13	Ukraine
14	Belgium
15	Hungary
16	Georgia

2017 Women's European Championship

Serbia
2nd title

14–woman roster
Bianka Buša, Bojana Živković, Mina Popović, Tijana Malešević, Brankica Mihajlović, Slađana Mirković, Stefana Veljković, Teodora Pušić, Ana Bjelica, Jovana Stevanović, Milena Rašić (c), Tijana Bošković, Bojana Milenković, Jelena Blagojević
Head coach
Zoran Terzić

== Individual awards ==
- Most valuable player
  (Serbia) Tijana Bošković
- Best setter
  (Netherlands) Laura Dijkema
- Best outside spikers
  (Serbia) Brankica Mihajlović
  (Netherlands) Anne Buijs
- Best middle blockers
  (Turkey) Eda Erdem Dündar
  (Serbia) Stefana Veljković
- Best opposite spiker
  (Netherlands) Lonneke Slöetjes
- Best libero
  (Azerbaijan) Valeriya Mammadova

== See also ==
- 2017 Men's European Volleyball Championship
