= Georgia women's national volleyball team =

National sports team

Georgia
- Association: Georgian Volleyball Federation
- Confederation: CEV
- Head coach: Piotr Matela
- FIVB ranking: 81 ▼5 (24 May 2026)

Uniforms
Home

European Championship
- Appearances: 1 (First in 2017)
- Best result: 16th (2017)

The Georgia women's national volleyball team represents the country of Georgia in international women's volleyball competitions and friendly matches.

== Results ==
=== European Championship ===
Champions Runners-up Third place Fourth place

European Championship record
Year	Round	Position	Pld	W	L	SW	SL	Squad
1949–1991	Part of Soviet Union							
(Czech Republic) 1993	Did Not Participate or Qualify							
(Netherlands) 1995	Did Not Participate or Qualify							
(Czech Republic) 1997	Did Not Participate or Qualify							
(Italy) 1999	Did Not Participate or Qualify							
(Bulgaria) 2001	Did Not Participate or Qualify							
(Turkey) 2003	Did Not Participate or Qualify							
(Croatia) 2005	Did Not Participate or Qualify							
(Belgium) / (Luxembourg) 2007	Did Not Participate or Qualify							
(Poland) 2009	Did Not Participate or Qualify							
(Italy) / (Serbia) 2011	Did Not Participate or Qualify							
(Germany) / (Switzerland) 2013	Did Not Participate or Qualify							
(Netherlands) / (Belgium) 2015	Did Not Participate or Qualify							
(Azerbaijan) / (Georgia (country)) 2017	Group stage	16th	3	0	3	1	9	Squad
(Hungary) / (Poland) / (Slovakia) / (Turkey) 2019	Did not qualify							
(Serbia) / (Bulgaria) / (Croatia) / (Romania) 2021	Did not qualify							
(Belgium) / (Italy) / (Estonia) / (Germany) 2023	Did not qualify							
Total	0 titles	1/16	3	0	3	1	9	—

=== European Volleyball League ===
Champions Runners-up Third place Fourth place

European League record
Year	Round	Position	Pld	W	L	SW	SL	Squad
2009	Did not participate							
2010	Did not participate							
2011	Did not participate							
2012	Did not participate							
2013	Did not participate							
2014	Did not participate							
2015	Group stage	6th	10	0	10	3	30	Squad
2016	Did not participate							
2017	Group stage	12th	6	0	6	1	18	Squad
2018	Group stage	19th	6	1	5	5	15	
2019	Group stage	19th	6	0	6	1	18	
2021	Did not qualify							
2022	Did not qualify							
2023	Group stage	15th	6	1	5	4	15	
2024	Group stage	17th	6	4	2	13	7	
2025	Group stage	17th	6	3	3	12	14	
2026	Group stage	21st	6	0	6	1	18	
Total	0 titles	8/17	52	9	43	40	135	—
