= Austria women's national volleyball team =

Women's national volleyball team representing Austria

Austria
- Association: Österreichischer Volleyball Verband
- Confederation: CEV
- FIVB ranking: 41 ▼2 (24 May 2026)

Uniforms
| Home | Away |

The Austria women's national volleyball team ( German : Österreichische Volleyballnationalmannschaft der Frauen ) represents Austria in international women's volleyball competitions and friendly matches. The National team is Organized by the Austrian Volleyball Association ( German : Österreichischer Volleyball Verband : ÖVV ) which is a member of the Federation of International Volleyball (FIVB) as well the European Volleyball Confederation (CEV), The national federation is also a part of the Middle European Volleyball Zonal Association (MEVZA).
