= Volleyball at the 2011 Games of the Small States of Europe =

Volleyball at the 2011 Games of the Small States of Europe was held from 31 May – 4 June 2011.

== Medal summary ==
=== Men ===
Event	Gold	Silver	Bronze
Indoor	Montenegro	Cyprus	Luxembourg
Beach	Andorra; Cyprus		Liechtenstein

=== Women ===
Event	Gold	Silver	Bronze
Indoor	San Marino	Cyprus	Luxembourg
Beach	Cyprus	Liechtenstein	Luxembourg

=== Medal table ===
Rank	Nation	Gold	Silver	Bronze	Total
1	Cyprus	2	2	0	4
2	Andorra	1	0	0	1
2	Montenegro	1	0	0	1
2	San Marino	1	0	0	1
5	Liechtenstein	0	1	1	2
6	Luxembourg	0	0	3	3
Totals (6 entries)		5	3	4	12

== Men ==
=== Indoor ===
Pos	Team	Pld	W	L	Pts	SW	SL	SR	SPW	SPL	SPR
1	Montenegro	5	5	0	10	15	1	15.000	396	285	1.389
2	Cyprus	5	4	1	9	13	3	4.333	385	306	1.258
3	Luxembourg	5	3	2	8	9	8	1.125	392	360	1.089
4	Iceland	5	2	3	7	7	11	0.636	382	427	0.895
5	San Marino	5	1	4	6	5	13	0.385	343	423	0.811
6	Andorra	5	0	5	5	2	15	0.133	219	312	0.702

Date	Time		Score		Set 1	Set 2	Set 3	Set 4	Set 5	Total
31 May	14:00	Iceland	3–1	San Marino	25–16	24–26	25–23	25–19		99–84
31 May	16:00	Cyprus	1–3	Montenegro	24–26	25–19	21–25	15–25		85–95
31 May	18:00	Andorra	0–3	Luxembourg	18–25	11–25	21–25			50–75
1 June	14:00	Luxembourg	3–1	Iceland	25–16	27–25	24–26	25–20		101–87
1 June	16:00	Montenegro	3–0	San Marino	25–18	25–15	25–14			75–47
1 June	18:00	Cyprus	3–0	Andorra	25–17	25–11	25–15			75–43
2 June	14:00	Iceland	0–3	Cyprus	19–25	16–25	21–25			56–75
2 June	16:00	San Marino	1–3	Luxembourg	25–23	16–25	21–25	15–25		77–98
2 June	18:00	Andorra	0–3	Montenegro	12–25	22–25	24–26			58–76
3 June	14:00	Cyprus	3–0	San Marino	25–17	25–16	25–11			75–44
3 June	16:00	Montenegro	3–0	Luxembourg	25–21	25–16	25–13			75–50
3 June	18:00	Andorra	1–3	Iceland	24–26	25–19	23–25	20–25		92–95
4 June	10:00	Luxembourg	0–3	Cyprus	22–25	23–25	23–25			68–75
4 June	12:00	Iceland	0–3	Montenegro	16–25	15–25	14–25			45–75
4 June	14:00	San Marino	3–1	Andorra	25–18	25–17	16–25	25–16		91–76

=== Beach ===
Pos	Team	Pld	W	L	Pts	SW	SL	SR	SPW	SPL	SPR
1	Andorra	4	3	1	7	6	2	3.000	164	118	1.390
2	Cyprus	4	3	1	7	6	2	3.000	160	139	1.151
3	Liechtenstein	4	2	2	6	5	4	1.250	170	161	1.056
4	Monaco	4	2	2	6	4	5	0.800	160	170	0.941
5	Iceland	4	0	4	4	0	8	0.000	97	168	0.577

Date	Time		Score		Set 1	Set 2	Set 3	Set 4	Set 5	Total
31 May	16:00	Iceland	0–2	Liechtenstein	14–21	11–21				25–42
31 May	17:00	Cyprus	2–0	Andorra	21–18	22–20				43–38
1 June	16:00	Andorra	2–0	Liechtenstein	21–14	21–14				42–28
1 June	17:00	Cyprus	2–0	Monaco	21–17	21–18				42–35
2 June	16:00	Liechtenstein	1–2	Monaco	21–19	25–27	12–15			58–61
2 June	17:00	Andorra	2–0	Iceland	21–4	21–16				42–20
3 June	16:00	Monaco	2–0	Iceland	21–17	21–11				42–28
3 June	17:00	Liechtenstein	2–0	Cyprus	21–16	21–17				42–33
4 June	11:00	Iceland	0–2	Cyprus	19–21	5–21				24–42
4 June	12:00	Monaco	0–2	Andorra	16–21	11–21				27–42

== Women ==
=== Indoor ===
Pos	Team	Pld	W	L	Pts	SW	SL	SR	SPW	SPL	SPR
1	San Marino	4	4	0	8	12	2	6.000	254	300	0.847
2	Cyprus	4	3	1	7	11	3	3.667	333	243	1.370
3	Luxembourg	4	2	2	6	6	7	0.857	267	308	0.867
4	Liechtenstein	4	1	3	5	4	9	0.444	268	322	0.832
5	Iceland	4	0	4	4	1	12	0.083	264	313	0.843

Date	Time		Score		Set 1	Set 2	Set 3	Set 4	Set 5	Total
31 May	16:00	San Marino	3–0	Luxembourg	25–15	25–18	25–15			75–48
31 May	18:00	Iceland	0–3	Liechtenstein	20–25	25–27	21–25			66–75
1 June	16:00	Luxembourg	0–3	Cyprus	20–25	18–25	12–25			50–75
1 June	18:00	San Marino	3–0	Iceland	25–23	25–21	25–19			75–63
2 June	16:00	Cyprus	3–0	Liechtenstein	25–11	25–13	25–13			75–37
2 June	18:00	Luxembourg	3–1	Iceland	25–15	13–25	25–21	25–22		88–83
3 June	16:00	Iceland	0–3	Cyprus	10–25	21–25	21–25			52–75
3 June	18:00	Liechtenstein	1–3	San Marino	27–25	21–25	23–25	10–25		81–100
4 June	12:30	Cyprus	2–3	San Marino	25–18	22–25	23–25	25–21	13–15	108–104
4 June	14:00	Liechtenstein	0–3	Luxembourg	24–26	25–27	26–28			75–81

=== Beach ===
==== Pool A ====
Pos	Team	Pld	W	L	Pts	SW	SL	SR	SPW	SPL	SPR
1	Liechtenstein	2	2	0	4	4	1	4.000	102	96	1.063
2	Cyprus	2	1	1	3	2	2	1.000	70	71	0.986
3	Iceland	2	0	2	2	1	4	0.250	86	102	0.843

Date	Time		Score		Set 1	Set 2	Set 3	Set 4	Set 5	Total
31 May	18:00	Cyprus	1–2	Liechtenstein	23–21	18–21	16–18			57–60
1 June	18:00	Liechtenstein	2–0	Iceland	21–14	21–14				42–28
2 June	14:00	Cyprus	2–0	Iceland	21–17	21–12				42–29

==== Pool B ====
Pos	Team	Pld	W	L	Pts	SW	SL	SR	SPW	SPL	SPR
1	Luxembourg	3	3	0	6	6	0	MAX	129	77	1.675
2	Malta	3	2	1	5	4	3	1.333	143	108	1.324
3	Monaco	3	1	2	4	3	4	0.750	110	126	0.873
4	Andorra	3	0	3	3	0	6	0.000	64	126	0.508

Date	Time		Score		Set 1	Set 2	Set 3	Set 4	Set 5	Total
31 May	14:00	Monaco	0–2	Luxembourg	13–21	13–21				26–42
31 May	15:00	Andorra	0–2	Malta	13–21	8–21				21–42
1 June	14:00	Monaco	2–0	Andorra	21–10	21–18				42–28
1 June	15:00	Luxembourg	2–0	Malta	21–14	24–22				45–36
2 June	15:00	Monaco	1–2	Malta	14–21	22–20	6–15			42–56
2 June	18:00	Luxembourg	2–0	Andorra	21–8	21–7				42–15

==== Knockout stage ====
===== Fifth place game =====
Date	Time		Score		Set 1	Set 2	Set 3	Set 4	Set 5	Total
3 June	14:00	Iceland	0–2	Monaco	12–21	13–21				25–42

===== Semifinals =====
Date	Time		Score		Set 1	Set 2	Set 3	Set 4	Set 5	Total
3 June	17:00	Liechtenstein	2–1	Malta	18–21	21–13	15–7			54–41
3 June	18:00	Luxembourg	1–2	Cyprus	21–15	13–21	7–15			41–51

===== Third place game =====
Date	Time		Score		Set 1	Set 2	Set 3	Set 4	Set 5	Total
3 June	10:00	Malta	1–2	Luxembourg	18–21	21–16	10–15			49–52

===== Final =====
Date	Time		Score		Set 1	Set 2	Set 3	Set 4	Set 5	Total
3 June	13:00	Liechtenstein	0–2	Cyprus	16–21	10–21				26–42
