= Volleyball at the 2013 Games of the Small States of Europe =

Volleyball at the 2013 Games of the Small States of Europe was held from 28 May – 1 June 2013 at d'Coque, Luxembourg.

== Medal summary ==
=== Medal table ===
* Host nation (Luxembourg)

Rank	Nation	Gold	Silver	Bronze	Total
1	Cyprus	3	1	0	4
2	Liechtenstein	1	0	1	2
3	Luxembourg*	0	3	0	3
4	Andorra	0	0	1	1
4	Monaco	0	0	1	1
4	San Marino	0	0	1	1
Totals (6 entries)		4	4	4	12

=== Indoor ===
Event	Gold	Silver	Bronze
Men	Cyprus	Luxembourg	Monaco
Women	Cyprus	Luxembourg	San Marino

=== Beach ===
Event	Gold	Silver	Bronze
Men	Liechtenstein	Cyprus	Andorra
Women	Cyprus	Luxembourg	Liechtenstein

== Men ==
=== Indoor ===
Pos	Team	Pld	W	L	Pts	SW	SL	SR	SPW	SPL	SPR
1	Cyprus	4	4	0	12	12	0	MAX	300	218	1.376
2	Luxembourg	4	2	2	7	8	7	1.143	346	317	1.091
3	Monaco	4	2	2	6	7	7	1.000	302	323	0.935
4	San Marino	4	2	2	5	7	8	0.875	332	350	0.949
5	Iceland	4	0	4	0	0	12	0.000	232	304	0.763

Date	Time		Score		Set 1	Set 2	Set 3	Set 4	Set 5	Total	Report
28 May	17:00	Monaco	3–1	San Marino	22–25	25–22	25–23	26–24		98–94	Report
28 May	20:00	Luxembourg	3–0	Iceland	25–23	29–27	25–18			79–68	Report
29 May	15:00	San Marino	0–3	Cyprus	18–25	19–25	19–25			56–75	Report
29 May	17:30	Monaco	1–3	Luxembourg	25–23	8–25	21–25	16–25		70–98	Report
30 May	15:00	Cyprus	3–0	Iceland	25–11	25–17	25–17			75–45	Report
30 May	20:00	Luxembourg	2–3	San Marino	25–27	25–18	26–28	25–19	10–15	111–107	Report
31 May	15:00	Monaco	0–3	Cyprus	22–25	20–25	17–25			59–75	Report
31 May	17:30	San Marino	3–0	Iceland	25–21	25–22	25–23			75–66	Report
1 Jun	13:00	Iceland	0–3	Monaco	20–25	19–25	17–25			56–75	Report
1 Jun	16:00	Cyprus	3–0	Luxembourg	25–23	25–15	25–20			75–58	Report

=== Beach ===
Pos	Team	Pld	W	L	Pts	SW	SL	SR	SPW	SPL	SPR
1	Liechtenstein	5	5	0	15	10	2	5.000	234	173	1.353
2	Cyprus	5	4	1	12	9	3	3.000	221	186	1.188
3	Andorra	5	3	2	9	8	4	2.000	228	183	1.246
4	Luxembourg	5	2	3	6	4	6	0.667	170	175	0.971
5	Monaco	5	1	4	3	2	8	0.250	153	202	0.757
6	Iceland	5	0	5	0	0	10	0.000	123	210	0.586

Date	Time		Score		Set 1	Set 2	Set 3	Total	Report
28 May	15:00	Cyprus	2–1	Andorra	21–14	18–21	15–13	54–48	Report
28 May	16:00	Luxembourg	2–0	Iceland	21–10	21–13		42–23	Report
28 May	18:00	Monaco	0–2	Liechtenstein	15–21	13–21		28–42	Report
29 May	15:00	Iceland	0–2	Cyprus	13–21	12–21		25–42	Report
29 May	16:00	Monaco	0–2	Luxembourg	11–21	13–21		24–42	Report
29 May	18:00	Liechtenstein	2–1	Andorra	21–13	22–20		43–33	Report
30 May	15:00	Cyprus	2–0	Monaco	21–12	21–16		42–28	Report
30 May	16:00	Luxembourg	0–2	Liechtenstein	12–21	21–23		33–44	Report
30 May	18:00	Andorra	2–0	Iceland	21–14	21–10		42–24	Report
31 May	16:00	Luxembourg	0–2	Cyprus	17–21	14–21		31–42	Report
31 May	17:00	Liechtenstein	2–0	Iceland	21–10	21–7		42–17	Report
31 May	18:00	Monaco	0–2	Andorra	17–21	14–21		31–42	Report
1 Jun	11:00	Cyprus	1–2	Liechtenstein	13–21	21–18	7–15	41–54	Report
1 Jun	12:00	Iceland	0–2	Monaco	17–21	17–21		34–42	Report
1 Jun	13:00	Andorra	2–0	Luxembourg	21–10	21–12		42–22	Report

== Women ==
=== Indoor ===
Pos	Team	Pld	W	L	Pts	SW	SL	SR	SPW	SPL	SPR
1	Cyprus	3	3	0	9	9	1	9.000	248	196	1.265
2	Luxembourg	3	2	1	5	6	6	1.000	264	265	0.996
3	San Marino	3	1	2	4	6	7	0.857	285	273	1.044
4	Iceland	3	0	3	0	2	9	0.222	206	269	0.766

Date	Time		Score		Set 1	Set 2	Set 3	Set 4	Set 5	Total	Report
29 May	12:30	Cyprus	3–0	Iceland	25–22	25–11	25–20			75–53	Report
29 May	20:00	San Marino	2–3	Luxembourg	22–25	25–14	24–26	25–23	13–15	109–103	Report
30 May	12:30	San Marino	1–3	Cyprus	25–23	17–25	23–25	14–25		79–98	Report
30 May	17:30	Luxembourg	3–1	Iceland	25–17	25–21	22–25	25–18		97–81	Report
31 May	12:30	Iceland	1–3	San Marino	18–25	14–25	25–22	15–25		72–97	Report
31 May	20:00	Cyprus	3–0	Luxembourg	25–23	25–19	25–22			75–64	Report

=== Beach ===
==== Group A ====
Pos	Team	Pld	W	L	Pts	SW	SL	SR	SPW	SPL	SPR	Qualification
1	Cyprus	2	2	0	6	4	0	MAX	84	57	1.474	Semifinals
2	Malta	2	1	1	3	2	2	1.000	70	71	0.986	Semifinals
3	Monaco	2	0	2	0	0	4	0.000	58	84	0.690	

Date	Time		Score		Set 1	Set 2	Set 3	Total	Report
28 May	13:00	Malta	2–0	Monaco	21–10	21–19		42–29	Report
29 May	13:00	Cyprus	2–0	Malta	21–14	21–14		42–28	Report
30 May	13:00	Monaco	0–2	Cyprus	17–21	12–21		29–42	Report

==== Group B ====
Pos	Team	Pld	W	L	Pts	SW	SL	SR	SPW	SPL	SPR	Qualification
1	Luxembourg	3	3	0	9	6	1	6.000	132	95	1.389	Semifinals
2	Liechtenstein	3	2	1	6	5	2	2.500	130	102	1.275	Semifinals
3	Andorra	3	1	2	3	2	4	0.500	104	118	0.881	
4	Iceland	3	0	3	0	0	6	0.000	79	130	0.608	

Date	Time		Score		Set 1	Set 2	Set 3	Total	Report
28 May	14:00	Liechtenstein	2–0	Iceland	21–9	21–12		42–21	Report
28 May	17:00	Andorra	0–2	Luxembourg	12–21	13–21		25–42	Report
29 May	14:00	Andorra	0–2	Liechtenstein	13–21	20–22		33–43	Report
29 May	17:00	Luxembourg	2–0	Iceland	21–10	21–15		42–25	Report
30 May	14:00	Iceland	0–2	Andorra	23–25	10–21		33–46	Report
30 May	17:00	Liechtenstein	1–2	Luxembourg	21–11	10–21	14–16	45–48	Report

==== Knockout stage ====
===== Bracket =====
Semi-finals
31 May
Cyprus	2
Liechtenstein	0
31 May
Malta	1
Luxembourg	2

Final
1 June
Cyprus	2
Luxembourg	0
Third place
1 June
Liechtenstein	2
Malta	1

===== Semifinals =====
Date	Time		Score		Set 1	Set 2	Set 3	Total	Report
31 May	14:00	Cyprus	2–0	Liechtenstein	21–9	21–17		42–26	Report
31 May	15:00	Luxembourg	2–1	Malta	21–17	16–21	15–11	52–49	Report

===== Fifth place game =====
Date	Time		Score		Set 1	Set 2	Set 3	Total	Report
31 May	13:00	Monaco	2–0	Andorra	21–4	25–23		46–27	Report

===== Third place game =====
Date	Time		Score		Set 1	Set 2	Set 3	Total	Report
1 Jun	10:00	Liechtenstein	2–1	Malta	18–21	21–15	15–11	54–47	Report

===== Final =====
Date	Time		Score		Set 1	Set 2	Set 3	Total	Report
1 Jun	14:00	Cyprus	2–0	Luxembourg	21–14	21–11		42–25	Report
