= 2014 FIVB Women's Volleyball World Championship qualification (CEV) =

The CEV qualification for the 2014 FIVB Women's Volleyball World Championship saw member nations compete for nine places at the finals in Italy. The two best-ranked teams from the 2013 Women's European Volleyball Championship, plus seven teams from the qualification tournaments qualify for the World Championship.

== European Championship ==
Qualified for the 2014 World Championship
Host of the 2014 World Championship

Rank	Team
1st place, gold medalist(s)	Russia
2nd place, silver medalist(s)	Germany
3rd place, bronze medalist(s)	Belgium
4	Serbia
5	Croatia
6	Italy
7	Turkey
8	France
9	Netherlands
10	Czech Republic
11	Poland
12	Belarus
13	Bulgaria
14	Switzerland
15	Azerbaijan
16	Spain

Eliminated in third qualification round

- Romania
- Slovakia
- Ukraine

Eliminated in second qualification round

- Austria
- Denmark
- Finland
- Great Britain
- Greece
- Hungary
- Israel
- Latvia
- Montenegro
- Portugal
- Slovenia
- Sweden

Eliminated in first qualification round

- Cyprus

== Draw ==
41 CEV national teams entered qualification. The teams were distributed according to their position in the CEV Senior Women's Confederation Rankings as of 1 January 2013 using the serpentine system for their distribution. (Rankings shown in brackets) Pools composition was determined by taking into consideration – as far as possible – the geographical location of the various countries. Teams ranked 1–12 do not compete in the first and second rounds, and automatically qualify for the third round. (Russia and Germany later qualified through European Championship)

First round

Pool A	Pool B	Pool C	Pool D
Croatia (14); Bosnia and Herzegovina (25); Montenegro (28); North Macedonia (40)	Israel (15); Belarus (20); Finland (24); Denmark (32)	Belgium (16); Portugal (27); Switzerland (30); Northern Ireland (—)	Ukraine (17); Hungary (22); Albania (34); Moldova (35)
Pool E	Pool F	Pool G	
Slovakia (18); Greece (19); Austria (26); Liechtenstein (41)	Estonia (36); Iceland (37); Latvia (—); Lithuania (—)	Luxembourg (33); Cyprus (38); San Marino (39); Malta (43); Scotland (45)	

Second round

	Pool H
First round Pool A runner-up	Montenegro
First round Pool B runner-up	Israel
First round Pool C runner-up	Switzerland
First round Pool D runner-up	Hungary
First round Pool E runner-up	Greece
First round Pool F runner-up	Latvia

Third round

The twenty remaining teams were distributed according to their position in the CEV Senior Women's Confederation Rankings as of 1 January 2013 using the serpentine system for their distribution. (Rankings shown in brackets)

Pool I	Pool J	Pool K
Turkey (2); Romania (12); Ukraine (17); Cyprus (38)	Serbia (4); Azerbaijan (13); Israel (15); Estonia (36)	Poland (5); Spain (11); Belgium (16); Switzerland (30)
Pool L	Pool M	
Netherlands (7); France (10); Croatia (14); Hungary (22)	Czech Republic (8); Bulgaria (9); Slovakia (18); Belarus (20)	

== First round ==
=== Pool A ===
- Venue: Sportski Centar Igalo, Herceg Novi, Montenegro
- Dates: May 24–26, 2013
- All times are Central European Summer Time (UTC+02:00)

Pos	Team	Pld	W	L	Pts	SW	SL	SR	SPW	SPL	SPR	Qualification
1	Croatia	3	3	0	9	9	1	9.000	248	144	1.722	Third round
2	Montenegro	3	2	1	6	7	4	1.750	236	231	1.022	Second round
3	Bosnia and Herzegovina	3	1	2	2	4	8	0.500	234	256	0.914	
4	North Macedonia	3	0	3	1	2	9	0.222	171	258	0.663	

Date	Time		Score		Set 1	Set 2	Set 3	Set 4	Set 5	Total	Report
24 May	17:30	Croatia	3–0	Bosnia and Herzegovina	25–15	25–18	25–10			75–43	Report
24 May	20:00	Montenegro	3–0	North Macedonia	25–10	25–20	25–20			75–50	Report
25 May	17:30	Croatia	3–0	North Macedonia	25–15	25–13	25–10			75–38	Report
25 May	20:00	Bosnia and Herzegovina	1–3	Montenegro	25–23	17–25	18–25	23–25		83–98	Report
26 May	17:30	North Macedonia	2–3	Bosnia and Herzegovina	18–25	25–23	7–25	25–20	8–15	83–108	Report
26 May	20:00	Montenegro	1–3	Croatia	17–25	7–25	25–23	14–25		63–98	Report

=== Pool B ===
- Venue: SK Olimpiets, Mogilev, Belarus
- Dates: May 24–26, 2013
- All times are Eastern European Summer Time (UTC+03:00)

Pos	Team	Pld	W	L	Pts	SW	SL	SR	SPW	SPL	SPR	Qualification
1	Belarus	3	3	0	9	9	0	MAX	228	136	1.676	Third round
2	Israel	3	2	1	6	6	3	2.000	195	162	1.204	Second round
3	Finland	3	1	2	3	3	7	0.429	204	226	0.903	
4	Denmark	3	0	3	0	1	9	0.111	145	248	0.585	

Date	Time		Score		Set 1	Set 2	Set 3	Set 4	Set 5	Total	Report
24 May	15:30	Israel	3–0	Denmark	25–12	25–13	25–15			75–40	Report
24 May	18:00	Belarus	3–0	Finland	25–23	28–26	25–10			78–59	Report
25 May	15:30	Denmark	0–3	Belarus	12–25	9–25	11–25			32–75	Report
25 May	18:00	Finland	0–3	Israel	13–25	12–25	22–25			47–75	Report
26 May	15:30	Denmark	1–3	Finland	13–25	15–25	25–23	20–25		73–98	Report
26 May	18:00	Belarus	3–0	Israel	25–15	25–12	25–18			75–45	Report

=== Pool C ===
- Venue: Sportcampus Lange Munte, Kortrijk, Belgium
- Dates: May 23–26, 2013
- All times are Central European Summer Time (UTC+02:00)

Pos	Team	Pld	W	L	Pts	SW	SL	SR	SPW	SPL	SPR	Qualification
1	Belgium	3	3	0	9	9	0	MAX	225	100	2.250	Third round
2	Switzerland	3	2	1	6	6	4	1.500	222	186	1.194	Second round
3	Portugal	3	1	2	3	4	6	0.667	204	211	0.967	
4	Northern Ireland	3	0	3	0	0	7	0.000	71	225	0.316	

Date	Time		Score		Set 1	Set 2	Set 3	Set 4	Set 5	Total	Report
23 May	15:00	Portugal	1–3	Switzerland	29–27	19–25	23–25	22–25		93–102	Report
24 May	15:00	Switzerland	3–0	Northern Ireland	25–6	25–2	25–10			75–18	Report
24 May	17:30	Belgium	3–0	Portugal	25–11	25–9	25–16			75–36	Report
25 May	15:00	Northern Ireland	0–3	Belgium	7–25	4–25	8–25			19–75	Report
26 May	15:00	Northern Ireland	0–3	Portugal	13–25	12–25	9–25			34–75	Report
26 May	17:30	Switzerland	0–3	Belgium	13–25	10–25	22–25			45–75	Report

=== Pool D ===
- Venue: Sporting Complex of Regional Sports School, Lutsk, Ukraine
- Dates: May 24–26, 2013
- All times are Eastern European Summer Time (UTC+03:00)

Pos	Team	Pld	W	L	Pts	SW	SL	SR	SPW	SPL	SPR	Qualification
1	Ukraine	3	3	0	9	9	1	9.000	247	160	1.544	Third round
2	Hungary	3	2	1	6	7	3	2.333	229	188	1.218	Second round
3	Albania	3	1	2	3	3	6	0.500	161	216	0.745	
4	Moldova	3	0	3	0	0	9	0.000	153	226	0.677	

Date	Time		Score		Set 1	Set 2	Set 3	Set 4	Set 5	Total	Report
24 May	17:00	Albania	0–3	Ukraine	9–25	14–25	17–25			40–75	Report
24 May	19:30	Hungary	3–0	Moldova	25–16	25–17	25–13			75–46	Report
25 May	17:00	Ukraine	3–0	Moldova	25–6	25–16	25–19			75–41	Report
25 May	19:30	Albania	0–3	Hungary	13–25	14–25	18–25			45–75	Report
26 May	17:00	Ukraine	3–1	Hungary	25–17	22–25	25–21	25–16		97–79	Report
26 May	19:30	Moldova	0–3	Albania	22–25	24–26	20–25			66–76	Report

=== Pool E ===
- Venue: Aréna Poprad, Poprad, Slovakia
- Dates: May 24–26, 2013
- All times are Central European Summer Time (UTC+02:00)

Pos	Team	Pld	W	L	Pts	SW	SL	SR	SPW	SPL	SPR	Qualification
1	Slovakia	3	3	0	8	9	3	3.000	285	211	1.351	Third round
2	Greece	3	2	1	6	7	3	2.333	230	197	1.168	Second round
3	Austria	3	1	2	4	5	6	0.833	242	221	1.095	
4	Liechtenstein	3	0	3	0	0	9	0.000	97	225	0.431	

Date	Time		Score		Set 1	Set 2	Set 3	Set 4	Set 5	Total	Report
24 May	15:30	Austria	0–3	Greece	23–25	20–25	22–25			65–75	Report
24 May	18:00	Slovakia	3–0	Liechtenstein	25–9	25–10	25–10			75–29	Report
25 May	15:30	Greece	3–0	Liechtenstein	25–9	25–12	25–11			75–32	Report
25 May	18:00	Slovakia	3–2	Austria	22–25	23–25	25–23	25–17	15–12	110–102	Report
26 May	15:30	Liechtenstein	0–3	Austria	14–25	8–25	14–25			36–75	Report
26 May	18:00	Greece	1–3	Slovakia	27–25	21–25	21–25	11–25		80–100	Report

=== Pool F ===
- Venue: Olympic Sports Centre, Daugavpils, Latvia
- Dates: May 24–26, 2013
- All times are Eastern European Summer Time (UTC+03:00)

Pos	Team	Pld	W	L	Pts	SW	SL	SR	SPW	SPL	SPR	Qualification
1	Estonia	3	3	0	9	9	0	MAX	225	131	1.718	Third round
2	Latvia	3	2	1	6	6	3	2.000	191	192	0.995	Second round
3	Lithuania	3	1	2	3	3	6	0.500	188	198	0.949	
4	Iceland	3	0	3	0	0	9	0.000	142	225	0.631	

Date	Time		Score		Set 1	Set 2	Set 3	Set 4	Set 5	Total	Report
24 May	16:30	Lithuania	3–0	Iceland	25–15	25–12	25–18			75–45	Report
24 May	19:00	Latvia	0–3	Estonia	13–25	16–25	9–25			38–75	Report
25 May	16:00	Iceland	0–3	Estonia	16–25	15–25	10–25			41–75	Report
25 May	18:30	Lithuania	0–3	Latvia	26–28	14–25	21–25			61–78	Report
26 May	16:00	Iceland	0–3	Latvia	16–25	21–25	19–25			56–75	Report
26 May	18:30	Estonia	3–0	Lithuania	25–12	25–19	25–21			75–52	Report

=== Pool G ===
- Venue: Cottonera Sports Complex, Cospicua, Malta
- Dates: June 28–30, 2013
- All times are Central European Summer Time (UTC+02:00)

Pos	Team	Pld	W	L	Pts	SW	SL	SR	SPW	SPL	SPR	Qualification
1	Cyprus	4	4	0	12	12	1	12.000	317	250	1.268	Third round
2	San Marino	4	3	1	8	9	6	1.500	331	308	1.075	
3	Scotland	4	2	2	5	7	8	0.875	331	326	1.015	
4	Luxembourg	4	1	3	4	7	11	0.636	338	378	0.894	
5	Malta	4	0	4	1	3	12	0.250	287	342	0.839	

Date	Time		Score		Set 1	Set 2	Set 3	Set 4	Set 5	Total	Report
28 Jun	14:00	Luxembourg	2–3	Scotland	11–25	25–22	22–25	25–22	12–15	95–109	Report
28 Jun	17:30	Cyprus	3–0	San Marino	25–14	26–24	25–20			76–58	Report
28 Jun	20:00	Malta	2–3	Luxembourg	25–20	9–25	17–25	25–17	9–15	85–102	Report
29 Jun	10:00	Cyprus	3–0	Malta	25–21	25–16	25–22			75–59	Report
29 Jun	13:00	San Marino	3–0	Scotland	25–20	25–17	25–19			75–56	Report
29 Jun	17:30	Luxembourg	0–3	Cyprus	10–25	13–25	20–25			43–75	Report
29 Jun	20:00	Malta	1–3	San Marino	20–25	10–25	25–14	23–25		78–89	Report
30 Jun	10:00	Scotland	1–3	Cyprus	22–25	25–16	22–25	21–25		90–91	Report
30 Jun	12:30	San Marino	3–2	Luxembourg	25–20	26–28	25–14	18–25	15–11	109–98	Report
30 Jun	16:00	Scotland	3–0	Malta	25–22	25–19	26–24			76–65	Report

== Second round ==
=== Pool H ===
- Venue: Metrowest Sport Palace, Ra'anana, Israel
- Dates: October 2–6, 2013
- All times are Israel Daylight Time (UTC+03:00)

Pos	Team	Pld	W	L	Pts	SW	SL	SR	SPW	SPL	SPR	Qualification
1	Hungary	5	4	1	12	14	7	2.000	474	425	1.115	Third round
2	Israel	5	4	1	12	14	7	2.000	451	452	0.998	Third round
3	Switzerland	5	3	2	9	12	8	1.500	446	393	1.135	Third round
4	Greece	5	3	2	8	11	9	1.222	465	433	1.074	
5	Latvia	5	1	4	2	5	14	0.357	385	440	0.875	
6	Montenegro	5	0	5	2	4	15	0.267	370	448	0.826	

Date	Time		Score		Set 1	Set 2	Set 3	Set 4	Set 5	Total	Report
02 Oct	15:00	Greece	1–3	Hungary	22–25	25–16	26–28	17–25		90–94	Report
02 Oct	17:30	Montenegro	0–3	Switzerland	22–25	20–25	15–25			57–75	Report
02 Oct	20:00	Israel	3–1	Latvia	25–21	25–15	8–25	25–20		83–81	Report
03 Oct	15:00	Switzerland	3–2	Hungary	23–25	25–19	19–25	25–19	15–9	107–97	Report
03 Oct	17:30	Latvia	0–3	Greece	23–25	20–25	21–25			64–75	Report
03 Oct	20:00	Montenegro	0–3	Israel	15–25	19–25	20–25			54–75	Report
04 Oct	15:00	Hungary	3–1	Latvia	21–25	25–21	25–17	25–10		96–73	Report
04 Oct	17:30	Israel	3–2	Switzerland	25–22	25–21	14–25	11–25	17–15	92–108	Report
04 Oct	20:00	Greece	3–2	Montenegro	23–25	25–17	20–25	25–19	15–8	108–94	Report
05 Oct	15:00	Switzerland	3–0	Latvia	25–15	25–14	25–23			75–52	Report
05 Oct	17:30	Montenegro	0–3	Hungary	22–25	17–25	15–25			54–75	Report
05 Oct	20:00	Israel	3–1	Greece	20–25	25–21	30–28	25–23		100–97	Report
06 Oct	15:00	Latvia	3–2	Montenegro	27–25	23–25	22–25	25–20	18–16	115–111	Report
06 Oct	17:30	Greece	3–1	Switzerland	25–16	25–21	20–25	25–19		95–81	Report
06 Oct	20:00	Hungary	3–2	Israel	23–25	24–26	25–18	25–20	15–12	112–101	Report

== Third round ==
=== Pool I ===
- Venue: Başkent Volleyball Hall, Ankara, Turkey
- Dates: January 3–5, 2014
- All times are Eastern European Time (UTC+02:00)

Pos	Team	Pld	W	L	Pts	SW	SL	SR	SPW	SPL	SPR	Qualification
1	Turkey	3	3	0	9	9	0	MAX	225	126	1.786	2014 World Championship
2	Romania	3	2	1	5	6	5	1.200	239	223	1.072	
3	Ukraine	3	1	2	4	5	6	0.833	222	224	0.991	
4	Cyprus	3	0	3	0	0	9	0.000	112	225	0.498	

Date	Time		Score		Set 1	Set 2	Set 3	Set 4	Set 5	Total	Report
03 Jan	17:30	Cyprus	0–3	Turkey	9–25	9–25	12–25			30–75	Report
03 Jan	20:30	Romania	3–2	Ukraine	23–25	26–24	19–25	25–21	15–12	108–107	Report
04 Jan	15:00	Turkey	3–0	Ukraine	25–7	25–12	25–21			75–40	Report
04 Jan	18:00	Cyprus	0–3	Romania	15–25	17–25	9–25			41–75	Report
05 Jan	15:00	Turkey	3–0	Romania	25–15	25–23	25–18			75–56	Report
05 Jan	18:00	Ukraine	3–0	Cyprus	25–16	25–12	25–13			75–41	Report

=== Pool J ===
- Venue: A.Y.S. Sport Hall, Baku, Azerbaijan
- Dates: January 3–5, 2014
- All times are Azerbaijan Time (UTC+04:00)

Pos	Team	Pld	W	L	Pts	SW	SL	SR	SPW	SPL	SPR	Qualification
1	Azerbaijan	3	3	0	8	9	3	3.000	274	225	1.218	2014 World Championship
2	Serbia	3	2	1	7	8	3	2.667	250	200	1.250	
3	Israel	3	1	2	3	4	6	0.667	192	228	0.842	
4	Estonia	3	0	3	0	0	9	0.000	162	225	0.720	

Date	Time		Score		Set 1	Set 2	Set 3	Set 4	Set 5	Total	Report
03 Jan	16:00	Serbia	3–0	Estonia	25–21	25–18	25–15			75–54	Report
03 Jan	19:00	Azerbaijan	3–1	Israel	25–15	25–21	19–25	25–15		94–76	Report
04 Jan	16:00	Serbia	3–0	Israel	25–9	25–12	25–20			75–41	Report
04 Jan	19:00	Estonia	0–3	Azerbaijan	17–25	19–25	13–25			49–75	Report
05 Jan	16:00	Israel	3–0	Estonia	25–21	25–20	25–18			75–59	Report
05 Jan	19:00	Azerbaijan	3–2	Serbia	19–25	25–18	18–25	25–16	18–16	105–100	Report

=== Pool K ===
- Venue: Atlas Arena, Łódź, Poland
- Dates: January 3–5, 2014
- All times are Central European Time (UTC+01:00)

Pos	Team	Pld	W	L	Pts	SW	SL	SR	SPW	SPL	SPR	Qualification
1	Belgium	3	3	0	9	9	0	MAX	227	154	1.474	2014 World Championship
2	Poland	3	2	1	6	6	3	2.000	215	158	1.361	
3	Spain	3	1	2	3	3	7	0.429	183	230	0.796	
4	Switzerland	3	0	3	0	1	9	0.111	157	240	0.654	

Date	Time		Score		Set 1	Set 2	Set 3	Set 4	Set 5	Total	Report
03 Jan	17:30	Spain	0–3	Belgium	20–25	18–25	12–25			50–75	Report
03 Jan	20:30	Switzerland	0–3	Poland	14–25	15–25	9–25			38–75	Report
04 Jan	17:30	Belgium	3–0	Switzerland	25–11	25–16	25–12			75–39	Report
04 Jan	20:30	Poland	3–0	Spain	25–13	25–12	25–18			75–43	Report
05 Jan	17:30	Switzerland	1–3	Spain	19–25	22–25	25–15	14–25		80–90	Report
05 Jan	20:30	Poland	0–3	Belgium	20–25	20–25	25–27			65–77	Report

=== Pool L ===
- Venue: Dvorana Gimnasium, Rovinj, Croatia
- Dates: January 3–5, 2014
- All times are Central European Time (UTC+01:00)

Pos	Team	Pld	W	L	Pts	SW	SL	SR	SPW	SPL	SPR	Qualification
1	Croatia	3	3	0	8	9	3	3.000	278	220	1.264	2014 World Championship
2	Netherlands	3	2	1	7	8	3	2.667	260	219	1.187	
3	Hungary	3	1	2	2	3	8	0.375	185	249	0.743	
4	France	3	0	3	1	3	9	0.333	232	267	0.869	

Date	Time		Score		Set 1	Set 2	Set 3	Set 4	Set 5	Total	Report
03 Jan	17:15	France	0–3	Netherlands	18–25	18–25	28–30			64–80	Report
03 Jan	20:15	Croatia	3–0	Hungary	25–20	25–10	25–16			75–46	Report
04 Jan	17:15	Netherlands	3–0	Hungary	25–15	25–19	25–11			75–45	Report
04 Jan	20:15	France	1–3	Croatia	19–25	25–18	15–25	10–25		69–93	Report
05 Jan	17:15	Hungary	3–2	France	12–25	17–25	25–22	25–23	15–4	94–99	Report
05 Jan	20:15	Croatia	3–2	Netherlands	25–18	25–23	22–25	22–25	16–14	110–105	Report

=== Pool M ===
- Venue: Arena Samokov, Samokov, Bulgaria
- Dates: January 3–5, 2014
- All times are Eastern European Time (UTC+02:00)

Pos	Team	Pld	W	L	Pts	SW	SL	SR	SPW	SPL	SPR	Qualification
1	Bulgaria	3	3	0	9	9	2	4.500	282	214	1.318	2014 World Championship
2	Czech Republic	3	2	1	6	6	3	2.000	209	188	1.112	
3	Slovakia	3	1	2	3	4	7	0.571	235	258	0.911	
4	Belarus	3	0	3	0	2	9	0.222	209	275	0.760	

Date	Time		Score		Set 1	Set 2	Set 3	Set 4	Set 5	Total	Report
03 Jan	17:30	Slovakia	1–3	Bulgaria	13–25	19–25	26–24	24–26		82–100	Report
03 Jan	20:30	Belarus	0–3	Czech Republic	20–25	15–25	18–25			53–75	Report
04 Jan	17:30	Bulgaria	3–0	Czech Republic	25–14	25–19	25–22			75–55	Report
04 Jan	20:30	Slovakia	3–1	Belarus	18–25	25–18	25–20	25–16		93–79	Report
05 Jan	17:30	Bulgaria	3–1	Belarus	25–11	32–34	25–9	25–23		107–77	Report
05 Jan	20:30	Czech Republic	3–0	Slovakia	29–27	25–12	25–21			79–60	Report

=== Second placed teams ===
Pos	Team	Pld	W	L	Pts	SW	SL	SR	SPW	SPL	SPR	Qualification
1	Serbia	3	2	1	7	8	3	2.667	250	200	1.250	2014 World Championship
2	Netherlands	3	2	1	7	8	3	2.667	260	219	1.187	2014 World Championship
3	Poland	3	2	1	6	6	3	2.000	215	158	1.361	
4	Czech Republic	3	2	1	6	6	3	2.000	209	188	1.112	
5	Romania	3	2	1	5	6	5	1.200	239	223	1.072	
