= Volleyball at the 2019 Games of the Small States of Europe =

- Venue: Mediterranean Sport Center
- Location: (Montenegro) Budva
- Start date: 28 May 2019
- End date: 1 June 2019

The volleyball competition at the 2019 Games of the Small States of Europe was held at the Mediterranean Sport Center, Budva from 28 May to 1 June 2019. The beach volleyball competition was held at the Slovenska Plaza, Budva from 28 to 31 May 2019.

== Medal summary ==
=== Medal table ===
* Host nation (Montenegro)

Rank	Nation	Gold	Silver	Bronze	Total
1	Montenegro*	2	0	0	2
2	Cyprus	1	3	0	4
3	Andorra	1	0	0	1
4	Monaco	0	1	0	1
5	Luxembourg	0	0	2	2
6	Iceland	0	0	1	1
6	Liechtenstein	0	0	1	1
Totals (7 entries)		4	4	4	12

=== Medalists ===
Event	Gold	Silver	Bronze
Men's indoor volleyball	Montenegro; Luka Babić; Božidar Ćuk; Gojko Ćuk; Jovan Delić; Ivan Ječmenica; Nikola Lakčević; Blažo Milić; Aleksandar Minić; Milutin Pavićević; Nemanja Peruničić; Nikola Radonić; Rajko Strugar; Marko Vukašinović; Ivan Zvicer	Cyprus; Angelos Alexiou; Antonis Antoniou; Dimitris Apostolou; Andreas Chrysostomou; Panagiotis Chrysostomou; Gabriel Georgiou; Stephanos Haridimou; Ioannis Kontos; Konstantinos Pafitis; Marinos Papachristodoulou; Christos Prodromou; Avgoustinos Savvidis; Sotiris Siapanis; Marios Stroukarevits	Luxembourg; Gilles Braas; Olivier de Castro; Janis Freidenfelds; Max Charel Funk; Mateja Gajin; Philippe Michel Glesener; Max Kiffer; Tim Peter Fabienne Laevaert; Jan Pierre Lux; Arnaud Paul Edouard Maroldt; Kamil Rychlicki; Anthony Michael Schumacher; Maurice Louis Jean van Landeghem; Chris Zuidberg
Women's indoor volleyball	Montenegro; Katarina Budrak; Milena Burzanović; Melisa Cenović; Jelena Cvijović; Saska Durović; Andrea Laković; Marija Milović; Anja Pejović; Nikoleta Perović; Teodora Rakočević; Tamara Roganović; Marija Šušić; Tijana Tvrdišić; Dijana Vuković	Cyprus; Antrea Charalambos; Vasiliki Chatzikonstanta; Christiana David; Emilia Demetriou; Eirini Ioannou; Stella Ioannou; Antri Iordanou; Evita Leonidou; Ioanna Leonidou; Elena Mosfilioti; Vasiliki Riala; Georgia Stavrinides; Rania Stylianou; Katerina Zakchaiou	Iceland; Ana Maria Vidal Bouza; Birta Björnsdóttir; Gígja Guðnadóttir; Helena Kristín Gunnarsdóttir; Hjördís Eiríksdóttir; Hulda Elma Eysteinsdóttir; Jóna Guðlaug; Kristina Apolostova; Matthildur Einarsdóttir; Sara Ósk Stefansdóttir; Særún Birta Eiríksdóttir; Thelma Dögg Grétarsdóttir; Unnur Árnadóttir; Velina Apolostova Vigfúsdóttir
Men's beach volleyball	Andorra; Abel Bernal; Xavier Folguera	Cyprus; Georgios Chrysostomou; Antonios Liotatis	Luxembourg; Matthias Cloot; Petko Tunchev
Women's beach volleyball	Cyprus; Mariota Angelopoulou; Zoi Konstantopoulou	Monaco; Caroline Revel-Chion; Eva Hamzaoui-Biton	Liechtenstein; Laura Marxer; Ramona Kaiser

== Men ==
=== Indoor ===
Pos	Team	Pld	W	L	Pts	SW	SL	SR	SPW	SPL	SPR
1st place, gold medalist(s)	Montenegro	5	5	0	15	15	2	7.500	419	335	1.251
2nd place, silver medalist(s)	Cyprus	5	4	1	12	13	4	3.250	404	349	1.158
3rd place, bronze medalist(s)	Luxembourg	5	3	2	9	10	8	1.250	417	384	1.086
4	San Marino	5	2	3	5	6	12	0.500	370	415	0.892
5	Monaco	5	1	4	4	6	13	0.462	403	441	0.914
6	Iceland	5	0	5	0	4	15	0.267	369	458	0.806

Date	Time		Score		Set 1	Set 2	Set 3	Set 4	Set 5	Total	Report
28 May	16:00	Montenegro	3–1	Iceland	23–25	25–20	25–21	25–14		98–80	Report
28 May	18:30	Luxembourg	3–1	Monaco	25–16	25–23	20–25	25–21		95–85	Report
28 May	20:50	Cyprus	3–0	San Marino	25–22	26–24	25–19			76–65	Report
29 May	16:05	Iceland	1–3	San Marino	25–21	19–25	21–25	20–25		85–96	Report
29 May	18:40	Monaco	0–3	Cyprus	20–25	18–25	19–25			57–75	Report
29 May	20:30	Montenegro	3–0	Luxembourg	25–13	26–24	25–21			76–58	Report
30 May	16:00	Luxembourg	3–1	Iceland	25–16	24–26	25–17	25–17		99–76	Report
30 May	18:15	Cyprus	1–3	Montenegro	13–25	25–18	17–25	23–25		78–93	Report
30 May	20:30	San Marino	3–2	Monaco	25–19	22–25	26–24	22–25	15–11	110–104	Report
31 May	16:00	Iceland	1–3	Monaco	25–15	16–25	21–25	22–25		84–90	Report
31 May	18:00	Montenegro	3–0	San Marino	25–18	25–18	25–16			75–52	Report
31 May	20:00	Luxembourg	1–3	Cyprus	27–25	21–25	20–25	22–25		90–100	Report
1 June	13:00	Monaco	0–3	Montenegro	25–27	22–25	20–25			67–77	Report
1 June	16:00	Cyprus	3–0	Iceland	25–15	25–13	25–16			75–44	Report
1 June	18:00	San Marino	0–3	Luxembourg	19–25	11–25	17–25			47–75	Report

== Women ==
=== Indoor ===
Pos	Team	Pld	W	L	Pts	SW	SL	SR	SPW	SPL	SPR
1st place, gold medalist(s)	Montenegro	5	5	0	14	15	2	7.500	402	287	1.401
2nd place, silver medalist(s)	Cyprus	5	4	1	13	14	3	4.667	401	314	1.277
3rd place, bronze medalist(s)	Iceland	5	3	2	8	9	8	1.125	359	353	1.017
4	San Marino	5	2	3	6	6	9	0.667	303	329	0.921
5	Luxembourg	5	1	4	4	5	13	0.385	362	400	0.905
6	Liechtenstein	5	0	5	0	1	15	0.067	253	397	0.637

Date	Time		Score		Set 1	Set 2	Set 3	Set 4	Set 5	Total	Report
28 May	09:00	Cyprus	3–0	Iceland	25–18	25–15	25–23			75–56	Report
28 May	11:00	Montenegro	3–0	Liechtenstein	25–12	25–12	25–13			75–37	Report
28 May	13:00	San Marino	3–0	Luxembourg	25–20	25–21	25–21			75–62	Report
29 May	09:00	Liechtenstein	1–3	Luxembourg	25–22	21–25	20–25	10–25		76–97	Report
29 May	11:30	Montenegro	3–2	Cyprus	25–21	19–25	25–19	18–25	15–11	102–101	Report
29 May	14:15	Iceland	3–0	San Marino	26–24	25–16	25–11			76–51	Report
30 May	09:00	Cyprus	3–0	Liechtenstein	25–13	25–21	25–12			75–46	Report
30 May	11:00	San Marino	0–3	Montenegro	19–25	11–25	19–25			49–75	Report
30 May	13:00	Luxembourg	2–3	Iceland	25–12	25–22	17–25	21–25	11–15	99–99	Report
31 May	09:00	Liechtenstein	0–3	Iceland	17–25	15–25	21–25			53–75	Report
31 May	11:00	Montenegro	3–0	Luxembourg	25–14	25–12	25–21			75–47	Report
31 May	13:00	Cyprus	3–0	San Marino	25–21	25–18	25–14			75–53	Report
1 June	09:00	Luxembourg	0–3	Cyprus	23–25	13–25	21–25			57–75	Report
1 June	11:00	Iceland	0–3	Montenegro	13–25	19–25	21–25			53–75	Report
1 June	20:00	San Marino	3–0	Liechtenstein	25–16	25–9	25–16			75–41	Report
