= Women's Volleyball at the Games of the Small States of Europe =

- Sport: Volleyball
- Founded: 1989
- First season: 1989
- No. of teams: 9 members
- Continent: Europe (CEV)
- Most recent champion: Luxembourg (2nd title)
- Most titles: Cyprus (9 titles)
- Broadcaster: Laola1.tv (online)
- Website: European Volleyball Confederation

The Women's Volleyball at the Games of the Small States of Europe is a multi sport Events for women's volleyball national teams, it was first introduced in the Third Games of the Small States of Europe Edition for women, currently it is held biannually and organized by the European Olympic Committees, controlled by the European Volleyball Confederation, the volleyball federation from Europe.

== Results summary ==
Year	Host	Final			Third place match		
Year	Host	Champions	Score	Runners-up	3rd place	Score	4th place
1989; Details	Cyprus	Cyprus		San Marino	Luxembourg		
1991; Details	Andorra	Cyprus		Luxembourg	San Marino		
1993; Details	Malta	Luxembourg		San Marino	Cyprus		
1995; Details	Luxembourg	Cyprus		San Marino	Luxembourg		
1997; Details	Iceland	Cyprus		Iceland	San Marino		
1999; Details	Liechtenstein	San Marino		Cyprus	Iceland		
2001; Details	San Marino	San Marino		Cyprus	Malta		
2003; Details	Malta	Cyprus		Luxembourg	San Marino		Malta
2005; Details	Andorra	San Marino		Cyprus	Luxembourg		Iceland
2007; Details	Monaco	Cyprus		Luxembourg	Liechtenstein		San Marino
2009; Details	Cyprus	Cyprus		San Marino	Iceland		Liechtenstein
2011; Details	Liechtenstein	San Marino		Cyprus	Luxembourg		Liechtenstein
2013; Details	Luxembourg	Cyprus		Luxembourg	San Marino		Iceland
2015; Details	Iceland	Montenegro		San Marino	Iceland		Luxembourg
2017; Details	San Marino	Cyprus		San Marino	Luxembourg		Iceland
2019; Details	Montenegro	Montenegro		Cyprus	Iceland		San Marino
2025; Details	Andorra	Luxembourg		Cyprus	Monaco		San Marino

== Medal table ==
Rank	Nation	Gold	Silver	Bronze	Total
1	Cyprus	9	6	1	16
2	San Marino	4	6	4	14
3	Luxembourg	2	4	5	11
4	Montenegro	2	0	0	2
5	Iceland	0	1	4	5
6	Liechtenstein	0	0	1	1
6	Malta	0	0	1	1
6	Monaco	0	0	1	1
Totals (8 entries)		17	17	17	51

== Sources ==
- European Volleyball Confederation
- www.eocgsse.org
