= 2024 Women's European Volleyball League =

European volleyball tournament

- Dates: 16 May – 16 June
- Teams: 21

The 2024 Women's European Volleyball League was the 15th edition of the annual Women's European Volleyball League, which featured women's national volleyball teams from 22 European countries. This season undergone a new format.

The winners and the runners-up qualified for the 2024 Challenger Cup.

The tournament had two divisions: the Golden League, which featured 12 teams, and the Silver League, which featured 9 teams.

== Format change ==
The CEV announced a change to the format starting this season after a decision was made by the CEV Board of Administration this on 16 September 2023 in Rome. Starting this season, the CEV adjusted the format so that it is similar to the FIVB Volleyball Nations League. This format change was made with consultation with the participating nations to reduce costs.

== Pools composition ==
Teams were seeded according to their European Ranking for national teams as of 25 September 2023. Rankings are shown in brackets.

List of teams in the 2024 Women's European Volleyball League: Participating in 2024 FIVB Women's Volleyball Nations League Participating in Golden League Participating in Silver League Team banned from competition Did not enter

=== Golden League ===
The numbers in brackets indicated their CEV rankings.

League phase
Ukraine (8)
Belgium (10)
Czech Republic (11)
Slovakia (12)
Slovenia (13)
Sweden (14)
Spain (16)
Romania (18)
Croatia (19)
Azerbaijan (20)
Austria (21)
Estonia (29)

=== Silver League ===
League phase
~~Bosnia and Herzegovina~~ (15)
Portugal (22)
Montenegro (23)
Hungary (25)
Finland (27)
Latvia (31)
Georgia (32)
Iceland (35)
Luxembourg (36)
Faroe Islands (37)

== Golden League ==
2024 Women's European Volleyball League

Tournament details
- Host country: Czech Republic (final four)
- Dates: 16 May – 16 June
- Teams: 12
- Runners-up: Czech Republic
- Third place: Belgium
- Fourth place: Romania

Tournament awards
- MVP: (Sweden) Isabelle Haak

Tournament statistics
- Matches played: 40

=== Schedule ===
The schedule was as follows:

| Round | Round date |
|---|---|
| Week 1 | 16–19 May 2024 |
| Week 2 | 24–26 May 2024 |
| Week 3 | 31 May – 2 June 2024 |
| Final four | 15–16 June 2024 |

=== Tournament schedule ===
Week 1
| Tournament 1 (Estonia) Rakvere | Tournament 2 (Croatia) Osijek | Tournament 3 (Sweden) Lund | Tournament 4 (Czech Republic) Teplice |
|---|---|---|---|
| Estonia (12) (H); Ukraine (1); Slovenia (5) | Croatia (9) (H); Slovakia (4); Azerbaijan (10) | Sweden (6) (H); Belgium (2); Spain (7) | Czech Republic (3) (H); Romania (8); Austria (11) |
Week 2
| Tournament 5 (Austria) Schwechat | Tournament 6 (Romania) Blaj | Tournament 7 (Slovenia) Maribor | Tournament 8 (Belgium) Beveren |
| Austria (11) (H); Ukraine (1); Slovakia (4) | Romania (8) (H); Sweden (6); Azerbaijan (10) | Slovenia (5) (H); Czech Republic (3); Spain (7) | Belgium (2) (H); Croatia (9); Estonia (12) |
Week 3
| Tournament 9 (Azerbaijan) Baku | Tournament 10 (Spain) Gijón | Tournament 11 (Slovakia) Bratislava | Tournament 12 (Poland) Tarnów (Note: Due to the Russian invasion of Ukraine, Ukraine's tournament was held at a neutral venue.) |
| Azerbaijan (10) (H); Austria (11); Estonia (12) | Spain (7) (H); Romania (8); Croatia (9) | Slovakia (4) (H); Slovenia (5); Sweden (6) | Ukraine (1) (H); Belgium (2); Czech Republic (3) |

=== Tiebreaker ===
1. Total number of victories (matches won, matches lost)
2. In the event of a tie, the following first tiebreaker will apply: The teams will be ranked by the most point gained per match as follows:
  - Match won 3–0 or 3–1: 3 points for the winner, 0 points for the loser
  - Match won 3–2: 2 points for the winner, 1 point for the loser
  - Match forfeited: 3 points for the winner, 0 points (0–25, 0–25, 0–25) for the loser
3. If teams are still tied after examining the number of victories and points gained, then the FIVB will examine the results in order to break the tie in the following order:
  - Set quotient: if two or more teams are tied on the number of points gained, they will be ranked by the quotient resulting from the division of the number of all set won by the number of all sets lost.
  - Points quotient: if the tie persists based on the set quotient, the teams will be ranked by the quotient resulting from the division of all points scored by the total of points lost during all sets.
  - If the tie persists based on the point quotient, the tie will be broken based on the team that won the match of the Round Robin Phase between the tied teams. When the tie in point quotient is between three or more teams, these teams ranked taking into consideration only the matches involving the teams in question.

=== League round ===
- All times are local.

| Pos | Team | Pld | W | L | Pts | SW | SL | SR | SPW | SPL | SPR | Qualification or relegation |
|---|---|---|---|---|---|---|---|---|---|---|---|---|
| 1 | Belgium | 6 | 6 | 0 | 18 | 18 | 4 | 4.500 | 542 | 418 | 1.297 | Golden League Final four |
| 2 | Czech Republic (Note: Qualified as final four host) | 6 | 5 | 1 | 15 | 16 | 5 | 3.200 | 504 | 425 | 1.186 | Golden League Final four |
| 3 | Romania | 6 | 4 | 2 | 12 | 14 | 6 | 2.333 | 467 | 408 | 1.145 | Golden League Final four |
| 4 | Sweden | 6 | 4 | 2 | 11 | 12 | 8 | 1.500 | 452 | 433 | 1.044 | Golden League Final four |
| 5 | Ukraine | 6 | 4 | 2 | 11 | 13 | 9 | 1.444 | 505 | 444 | 1.137 | |
| 6 | Spain | 6 | 3 | 3 | 9 | 12 | 12 | 1.000 | 509 | 515 | 0.988 | |
| 7 | Slovakia | 6 | 3 | 3 | 9 | 9 | 11 | 0.818 | 443 | 457 | 0.969 | |
| 8 | Azerbaijan | 6 | 2 | 4 | 7 | 9 | 12 | 0.750 | 428 | 465 | 0.920 | |
| 9 | Croatia | 6 | 2 | 4 | 7 | 9 | 13 | 0.692 | 469 | 494 | 0.949 | |
| 10 | Slovenia | 6 | 1 | 5 | 4 | 6 | 15 | 0.400 | 433 | 491 | 0.882 | |
| 11 | Estonia | 6 | 1 | 5 | 3 | 4 | 16 | 0.250 | 371 | 489 | 0.759 | |
| 12 | Austria | 6 | 1 | 5 | 2 | 6 | 17 | 0.353 | 447 | 531 | 0.842 | Relegation to Silver League |

Source: CEV

==== Week 1 ====
===== Tournament 1 =====
- Venue: Rakvere Sports Hall, Rakvere, Estonia

| Date | Time | | Score | | Set 1 | Set 2 | Set 3 | Set 4 | Set 5 | Total | Report |
|---|---|---|---|---|---|---|---|---|---|---|---|
| 17 May | 18:00 | Slovenia | 3–0 | Estonia | 25–23 | 25–18 | 25–18 | | | 75–59 | Report |
| 18 May | 16:00 | Ukraine | 3–2 | Slovenia | 23–25 | 25–15 | 20–25 | 25–17 | 15–11 | 108–93 | Report |
| 19 May | 17:00 | Estonia | 0–3 | Ukraine | 11–25 | 14–25 | 13–25 | | | 38–75 | Report |

===== Tournament 2 =====
- Venue: Gradski vrt Hall Smaller Hall, Osijek, Croatia

| Date | Time | | Score | | Set 1 | Set 2 | Set 3 | Set 4 | Set 5 | Total | Report |
|---|---|---|---|---|---|---|---|---|---|---|---|
| 17 May | 19:00 | Azerbaijan | 3–0 | Croatia | 25–19 | 25–19 | 25–22 | | | 75–60 | Report |
| 18 May | 15:00 | Slovakia | 3–1 | Azerbaijan | 21–25 | 25–20 | 25–16 | 25–19 | | 96–80 | Report |
| 19 May | 19:00 | Croatia | 3–0 | Slovakia | 25–21 | 25–17 | 25–21 | | | 75–59 | Report |

===== Tournament 3 =====
- Venue: Sparbanken Skåne Arena, Lund, Sweden

| Date | Time | | Score | | Set 1 | Set 2 | Set 3 | Set 4 | Set 5 | Total | Report |
|---|---|---|---|---|---|---|---|---|---|---|---|
| 17 May | 18:00 | Spain | 2–3 | Sweden | 28–26 | 22–25 | 25–22 | 18–25 | 12–15 | 105–113 | Report |
| 18 May | 16:00 | Belgium | 3–1 | Spain | 28–30 | 25–16 | 25–18 | 25–16 | | 103–80 | Report |
| 19 May | 15:00 | Sweden | 0–3 | Belgium | 17–25 | 19–25 | 14–25 | | | 50–75 | Report |

===== Tournament 4 =====
- Venue: Sportarena, Teplice, Czech Republic

| Date | Time | | Score | | Set 1 | Set 2 | Set 3 | Set 4 | Set 5 | Total | Report |
|---|---|---|---|---|---|---|---|---|---|---|---|
| 16 May | 17:00 | Austria | 0–3 | Czech Republic | 10–25 | 9–25 | 19–25 | | | 38–75 | Report |
| 17 May | 17:00 | Romania | 3–0 | Austria | 25–13 | 25–20 | 25–19 | | | 75–52 | Report |
| 18 May | 17:00 | Czech Republic | 3–1 | Romania | 25–18 | 22–25 | 25–23 | 25–23 | | 97–89 | Report |

==== Week 2 ====
===== Tournament 5 =====
- Venue: Multiversum, Schwechat, Austria

| Date | Time | | Score | | Set 1 | Set 2 | Set 3 | Set 4 | Set 5 | Total | Report |
|---|---|---|---|---|---|---|---|---|---|---|---|
| 24 May | 16:00 | Slovakia | 3–1 | Austria | 22–25 | 25–15 | 25–19 | 25–23 | | 97–82 | Report |
| 25 May | 18:00 | Ukraine | 3–0 | Slovakia | 25–20 | 25–21 | 25–11 | | | 75–52 | Report |
| 26 May | 18:00 | Austria | 1–3 | Ukraine | 22–25 | 25–20 | 14–25 | 24–26 | | 85–96 | Report |

===== Tournament 6 =====
- Venue: Sala Polivalentă, Blaj, Romania

| Date | Time | | Score | | Set 1 | Set 2 | Set 3 | Set 4 | Set 5 | Total | Report |
|---|---|---|---|---|---|---|---|---|---|---|---|
| 24 May | 16:30 | Azerbaijan | 0–3 | Romania | 19–25 | 15–25 | 10–25 | | | 44–75 | Report |
| 25 May | 16:30 | Sweden | 3–0 | Azerbaijan | 25–19 | 25–19 | 25–19 | | | 75–57 | Report |
| 26 May | 16:30 | Romania | 3–0 | Sweden | 25–23 | 25–23 | 25–18 | | | 75–64 | Report |

===== Tournament 7 =====
- Venue: Lukna Sports Hall, Maribor, Slovenia

| Date | Time | | Score | | Set 1 | Set 2 | Set 3 | Set 4 | Set 5 | Total | Report |
|---|---|---|---|---|---|---|---|---|---|---|---|
| 24 May | 19:00 | Spain | 3–0 | Slovenia | 25–16 | 25–22 | 25–13 | | | 75–51 | Report |
| 25 May | 19:00 | Czech Republic | 3–0 | Spain | 25–19 | 25–19 | 25–17 | | | 75–55 | Report |
| 26 May | 19:00 | Slovenia | 1–3 | Czech Republic | 16–25 | 25–20 | 21–25 | 21–25 | | 83–95 | Report |

===== Tournament 8 =====
- Venue: Topsporthal, Beveren, Belgium

| Date | Time | | Score | | Set 1 | Set 2 | Set 3 | Set 4 | Set 5 | Total | Report |
|---|---|---|---|---|---|---|---|---|---|---|---|
| 24 May | 20:30 | Estonia | 0–3 | Belgium | 9–25 | 19–25 | 10–25 | | | 38–75 | Report |
| 25 May | 20:30 | Croatia | 3–1 | Estonia | 25–23 | 25–27 | 25–14 | 30–28 | | 105–92 | Report |
| 26 May | 18:00 | Belgium | 3–1 | Croatia | 25–19 | 25–14 | 14–25 | 25–15 | | 89–73 | Report |

==== Week 3 ====
===== Tournament 9 =====
- Venue: Heydar Aliyev Sports and Concert Complex, Baku, Azerbaijan

| Date | Time | | Score | | Set 1 | Set 2 | Set 3 | Set 4 | Set 5 | Total | Report |
|---|---|---|---|---|---|---|---|---|---|---|---|
| 31 May | 18:00 | Estonia | 0–3 | Azerbaijan | 21–25 | 12–25 | 20–25 | | | 53–75 | Report |
| 1 Jun | 18:00 | Austria | 1–3 | Estonia | 25–16 | 23–25 | 21–25 | 15–25 | | 84–91 | Report |
| 2 Jun | 17:00 | Azerbaijan | 2–3 | Austria | 25–22 | 25–19 | 23–25 | 16–25 | 8–15 | 97–106 | Report |

===== Tournament 10 =====
- Venue: Palacio de Deportes de Gijón, Gijón, Spain

| Date | Time | | Score | | Set 1 | Set 2 | Set 3 | Set 4 | Set 5 | Total | Report |
|---|---|---|---|---|---|---|---|---|---|---|---|
| 31 May | 20:00 | Croatia | 2–3 | Spain | 17–25 | 25–16 | 20–25 | 25–23 | 8–15 | 95–104 | Report |
| 1 Jun | 17:00 | Romania | 3–0 | Croatia | 25–18 | 25–22 | 25–21 | | | 75–61 | Report |
| 2 Jun | 12:00 | Spain | 3–1 | Romania | 15–25 | 25–19 | 25–16 | 25–18 | | 90–78 | Report |

===== Tournament 11 =====
- Venue: Hala Pasienky, Bratislava, Slovakia

| Date | Time | | Score | | Set 1 | Set 2 | Set 3 | Set 4 | Set 5 | Total | Report |
|---|---|---|---|---|---|---|---|---|---|---|---|
| 31 May | 19:00 | Sweden | 3–0 | Slovakia | 25–19 | 25–23 | 25–18 | | | 75–60 | Report |
| 1 Jun | 18:00 | Slovenia | 0–3 | Sweden | 18–25 | 20–25 | 23–25 | | | 61–75 | Report |
| 2 Jun | 18:00 | Slovakia | 3–0 | Slovenia | 25–21 | 29–27 | 25–22 | | | 79–70 | Report |

===== Tournament 12 =====
- Venue: Arena Jaskółka, Tarnów, Poland

| Date | Time | | Score | | Set 1 | Set 2 | Set 3 | Set 4 | Set 5 | Total | Report |
|---|---|---|---|---|---|---|---|---|---|---|---|
| 31 May | 17:00 | Czech Republic | 3–0 | Ukraine | 25–20 | 25–19 | 25–22 | | | 75–61 | Report |
| 1 Jun | 17:00 | Belgium | 3–1 | Czech Republic | 23–25 | 26–24 | 25–18 | 25–20 | | 99–87 | Report |
| 2 Jun | 17:00 | Ukraine | 1–3 | Belgium | 21–25 | 28–26 | 18–25 | 23–25 | | 90–101 | Report |

=== Results by round ===
The table listed the results of teams in each round.

| Win | Loss |

| Team ╲ Round | 1 | 2 | 3 | 4 | 5 | 6 |
|---|---|---|---|---|---|---|
| Ukraine | W | W | W | W | L | L |
| Belgium | W | W | W | W | W | W |
| Czech Republic | W | W | W | W | W | L |
| Slovakia | W | L | W | L | L | W |
| Slovenia | W | L | L | L | L | L |
| Sweden | W | L | W | L | W | W |
| Spain | L | L | W | L | W | W |
| Romania | W | L | W | W | W | L |
| Croatia | L | W | W | L | L | L |
| Azerbaijan | W | L | L | L | W | L |
| Austria | L | L | L | L | L | W |
| Estonia | L | L | L | L | L | W |

Source: CEV

=== Final four ===
The Final four was held in the Czech Republic.

Semifinals
15 June
Belgium | 2
Sweden | 3
15 June
Czech Republic | 3
Romania | 1

Final
16 June
Sweden | 3
Czech Republic | 2
3rd place match
16 June
Belgium | 3
Romania | 0

==== Semifinals ====
| Date | Time | | Score | | Set 1 | Set 2 | Set 3 | Set 4 | Set 5 | Total | Report |
|---|---|---|---|---|---|---|---|---|---|---|---|
| 15 Jun | 15:00 | Belgium | 2–3 | Sweden | 25–16 | 22–25 | 22–25 | 25–22 | 12–15 | 106–103 | Report |
| 15 Jun | 18:00 | Czech Republic | 3–1 | Romania | 19–25 | 25–13 | 25–18 | 30–28 | | 99–84 | Report |

==== 3rd place match ====
| Date | Time | | Score | | Set 1 | Set 2 | Set 3 | Set 4 | Set 5 | Total | Report |
|---|---|---|---|---|---|---|---|---|---|---|---|
| 16 Jun | 15:00 | Belgium | 3–0 | Romania | 25–14 | 25–12 | 25–19 | | | 75–45 | Report |

==== Final ====
| Date | Time | | Score | | Set 1 | Set 2 | Set 3 | Set 4 | Set 5 | Total | Report |
|---|---|---|---|---|---|---|---|---|---|---|---|
| 16 Jun | 18:00 | Sweden | 3–2 | Czech Republic | 25–22 | 21–25 | 18–25 | 25–20 | 15–11 | 104–103 | Report |

== Silver League ==
2024 Women's European Volleyball League

Tournament details
- Host country: Finland / Portugal (final)
- Dates: 16 May – 16 June
- Teams: 9
- Runners-up: Finland
- Third place: Hungary
- Fourth place: Montenegro

Tournament statistics
- Matches played: 25

=== Schedule ===
The schedule was as follows:

| Round | Round date |
|---|---|
| Week 1 | 16–19 May 2024 |
| Week 2 | 24–26 May 2024 |
| Week 3 | 31 May – 2 June 2024 |
| Week 4 | 7–9 June 2024 |
| Final | 13 & 16 June 2024 |

=== Tournament schedule ===
Week 1
| Tournament 1 (Iceland) Kópavogur | Tournament 2 (Finland) Tampere | Tournament 3 (Montenegro) Podgorica |
|---|---|---|
| Iceland (8) (H); Hungary (4); Latvia (6) | Finland (5) (H); Portugal (2); Luxembourg (9) | Montenegro (3) (H); Georgia (7); Faroe Islands (10) |
Week 2
| Tournament 4 Luxembourg | Tournament 5 (Latvia) Riga | Tournament 6 (Portugal) Santo Tirso |
| Luxembourg (9) (H); Hungary (4); Faroe Islands (10) | Latvia (6) (H); ~~Bosnia and Herzegovina~~ (1); Georgia (7) | Portugal (2) (H); Montenegro (3); Iceland (8) |
Week 3
| Tournament 7 (Georgia (country)) Tbilisi | Tournament 8 (Hungary) Érd | Tournament 9 (Bosnia and Herzegovina) Sarajevo |
| Georgia (7) (H); Iceland (8); Luxembourg (9) | Hungary (4) (H); Finland (5); Latvia (6) | ~~Bosnia and Herzegovina (1) (H)~~; Portugal (2); Montenegro (3) |
Week 4
Tournament 10 (Faroe Islands) Tórshavn
Faroe Islands (10) (H); ~~Bosnia and Herzegovina~~ (1); Finland (5)

=== Tiebreaker ===
1. Total number of victories (matches won, matches lost)
2. In the event of a tie, the following first tiebreaker will apply: The teams will be ranked by the most point gained per match as follows:
  - Match won 3–0 or 3–1: 3 points for the winner, 0 points for the loser
  - Match won 3–2: 2 points for the winner, 1 point for the loser
  - Match forfeited: 3 points for the winner, 0 points (0–25, 0–25, 0–25) for the loser
3. If teams are still tied after examining the number of victories and points gained, then the FIVB will examine the results in order to break the tie in the following order:
  - Set quotient: if two or more teams are tied on the number of points gained, they will be ranked by the quotient resulting from the division of the number of all set won by the number of all sets lost.
  - Points quotient: if the tie persists based on the set quotient, the teams will be ranked by the quotient resulting from the division of all points scored by the total of points lost during all sets.
  - If the tie persists based on the point quotient, the tie will be broken based on the team that won the match of the Round Robin Phase between the tied teams. When the tie in point quotient is between three or more teams, these teams ranked taking into consideration only the matches involving the teams in question.

=== League round ===
- All times are local.

| Pos | Team | Pld | W | L | Pts | SW | SL | SR | SPW | SPL | SPR | Qualification |
|---|---|---|---|---|---|---|---|---|---|---|---|---|
| 1 | Finland | 6 | 6 | 0 | 18 | 18 | 3 | 6.000 | 517 | 341 | 1.516 | Silver League Final |
| 2 | Hungary | 6 | 5 | 1 | 15 | 16 | 4 | 4.000 | 495 | 365 | 1.356 | |
| 3 | Portugal (Note: Portugal advanced to the final after the results against the worst-ranked team were not counted towards the final standings.) | 5 | 4 | 1 | 12 | 13 | 3 | 4.333 | 385 | 243 | 1.584 | Silver League Final |
| 4 | Montenegro | 5 | 4 | 1 | 12 | 12 | 5 | 2.400 | 402 | 263 | 1.529 | |
| 5 | Georgia | 6 | 4 | 2 | 12 | 13 | 7 | 1.857 | 441 | 353 | 1.249 | |
| 6 | Latvia | 6 | 3 | 3 | 9 | 11 | 10 | 1.100 | 451 | 402 | 1.122 | |
| 7 | Luxembourg | 6 | 2 | 4 | 5 | 6 | 14 | 0.429 | 368 | 468 | 0.786 | |
| 8 | Faroe Islands | 6 | 1 | 5 | 3 | 3 | 15 | 0.200 | 302 | 375 | 0.805 | |
| 9 | Iceland | 6 | 0 | 6 | 1 | 5 | 18 | 0.278 | 444 | 545 | 0.815 | |
| 10 | Bosnia and Herzegovina (Note: Right before the tournament started, Bosnia and Herzegovina abruptly withdrew. All games involving Bosnia and Herzegovina were deemed as 3–0 forfeit wins for the opposing team.) | 6 | 0 | 6 | 0 | 0 | 18 | 0.000 | 0 | 450 | 0.000 | Withdrew |

Source: CEV
Notes:

Due to the last-minute withdrawal of Bosnia and Herzegovina shortly before the start of the competition, a provision was added to the rules governing this year's European Silver League. To compare the results achieved by the participating teams according to the same number of matches (5) and compile a final standing of the League Round accordingly, it was decided to remove the results from the matches played with the lowest-ranked opponent for each of the participating teams. Based on these criteria, the two teams due to contest the final matches are Finland and Portugal.

==== Week 1 ====
===== Tournament 1 =====
- Venue: Digranes Sports Hall, Kópavogur, Iceland

| Date | Time | | Score | | Set 1 | Set 2 | Set 3 | Set 4 | Set 5 | Total | Report |
|---|---|---|---|---|---|---|---|---|---|---|---|
| 17 May | 16:00 | Latvia | 3–1 | Iceland | 20–25 | 25–18 | 25–14 | 25–19 | | 95–76 | Report |
| 18 May | 20:00 | Hungary | 3–1 | Latvia | 25–21 | 28–30 | 25–9 | 25–18 | | 103–78 | Report |
| 19 May | 19:00 | Iceland | 0–3 | Hungary | 20–25 | 15–25 | 15–25 | | | 50–75 | Report |

===== Tournament 2 =====
- Venue: Hakametsä Arena, Tampere, Finland

| Date | Time | | Score | | Set 1 | Set 2 | Set 3 | Set 4 | Set 5 | Total | Report |
|---|---|---|---|---|---|---|---|---|---|---|---|
| 16 May | 18:30 | Luxembourg | 0–3 | Finland | 7–25 | 19–25 | 9–25 | | | 35–75 | Report |
| 17 May | 16:30 | Portugal | 3–0 | Luxembourg | 25–10 | 25–13 | 25–21 | | | 75–44 | Report |
| 18 May | 15:00 | Finland | 3–1 | Portugal | 15–25 | 28–26 | 25–14 | 25–20 | | 93–85 | Report |

===== Tournament 3 =====
- Venue: Verde Complex, Podgorica, Montenegro

| Date | Time | | Score | | Set 1 | Set 2 | Set 3 | Set 4 | Set 5 | Total | Report |
|---|---|---|---|---|---|---|---|---|---|---|---|
| 17 May | 18:00 | Faroe Islands | 0–3 | Montenegro | 13–25 | 10–25 | 15–25 | | | 38–75 | Report |
| 18 May | 18:00 | Georgia | 3–0 | Faroe Islands | 25–16 | 25–13 | 25–19 | | | 75–48 | Report |
| 19 May | 18:00 | Montenegro | 3–1 | Georgia | 25–13 | 23–25 | 25–14 | 25–16 | | 98–68 | Report |

==== Week 2 ====
===== Tournament 4 =====
- Venue: d'Coque, Luxembourg City, Luxembourg

| Date | Time | | Score | | Set 1 | Set 2 | Set 3 | Set 4 | Set 5 | Total | Report |
|---|---|---|---|---|---|---|---|---|---|---|---|
| 24 May | 18:00 | Faroe Islands | 0–3 | Luxembourg | 21–25 | 17–25 | 17–25 | | | 55–75 | Report |
| 25 May | 18:00 | Hungary | 3–0 | Faroe Islands | 25–18 | 25–8 | 25–10 | | | 75–36 | Report |
| 26 May | 16:00 | Luxembourg | 0–3 | Hungary | 17–25 | 14–25 | 19–25 | | | 50–75 | Report |

===== Tournament 5 =====
- Venue: Olympic Sports Centre, Riga, Latvia

| Date | Time | | Score | | Set 1 | Set 2 | Set 3 | Set 4 | Set 5 | Total | Report |
|---|---|---|---|---|---|---|---|---|---|---|---|
| 24 May | 19:30 | Georgia | 0–3 | Latvia | 23–25 | 14–25 | 14–25 | | | 51–75 | Report |
| 25 May | 17:00 | Bosnia and Herzegovina | 0–3 | Georgia | 0–25 | 0–25 | 0–25 | | | 0–75 | Report |
| 26 May | 17:00 | Latvia | 3–0 | Bosnia and Herzegovina | 25–0 | 25–0 | 25–0 | | | 75–0 | Report |

===== Tournament 6 =====
- Venue: Pavilhão Desportivo Municipal, Santo Tirso, Portugal

| Date | Time | | Score | | Set 1 | Set 2 | Set 3 | Set 4 | Set 5 | Total | Report |
|---|---|---|---|---|---|---|---|---|---|---|---|
| 24 May | 21:00 | Iceland | 0–3 | Portugal | 19–25 | 18–25 | 12–25 | | | 49–75 | Report |
| 25 May | 21:00 | Montenegro | 3–1 | Iceland | 25–14 | 27–25 | 20–25 | 25–18 | | 97–82 | Report |
| 26 May | 21:00 | Portugal | 3–0 | Montenegro | 25–23 | 25–20 | 25–14 | | | 75–57 | Report |

==== Week 3 ====
===== Tournament 7 =====
- Venue: (Georgia (country)) Tbilisi Sports Palace Small Hall, Tbilisi, Georgia

| Date | Time | | Score | | Set 1 | Set 2 | Set 3 | Set 4 | Set 5 | Total | Report |
|---|---|---|---|---|---|---|---|---|---|---|---|
| 31 May | 20:00 | Luxembourg | 0–3 | Georgia | 24–26 | 18–25 | 15–25 | | | 57–76 | Report |
| 1 Jun | 20:00 | Iceland | 2–3 | Luxembourg | 25–21 | 25–18 | 23–25 | 25–27 | 14–16 | 112–107 | Report |
| 2 Jun | 20:00 | Georgia | 3–1 | Iceland | 25–16 | 21–25 | 25–19 | 25–15 | | 96–75 | Report |

===== Tournament 8 =====
- Venue: Érd Aréna, Érd, Hungary

| Date | Time | | Score | | Set 1 | Set 2 | Set 3 | Set 4 | Set 5 | Total | Report |
|---|---|---|---|---|---|---|---|---|---|---|---|
| 31 May | 18:00 | Latvia | 0–3 | Hungary | 17–25 | 16–25 | 16–25 | | | 49–75 | Report |
| 1 Jun | 18:00 | Finland | 3–1 | Latvia | 25–14 | 25–18 | 22–25 | 25–22 | | 97–79 | Report |
| 2 Jun | 18:00 | Hungary | 1–3 | Finland | 17–25 | 24–26 | 27–25 | 24–26 | | 92–102 | Report |

===== Tournament 9 =====
- Venue: Sportska dvorana Goran Čengić, Sarajevo, Bosnia and Herzegovina

| Date | Time | | Score | | Set 1 | Set 2 | Set 3 | Set 4 | Set 5 | Total | Report |
|---|---|---|---|---|---|---|---|---|---|---|---|
| 31 May | 20:00 | Montenegro | 3–0 | Bosnia and Herzegovina | 25–0 | 25–0 | 25–0 | | | 75–0 | Report |
| 1 Jun | 20:00 | Portugal | 0–0 | Montenegro | – | – | – | | | 0–0 | Report |
| 2 Jun | 20:00 | Bosnia and Herzegovina | 0–3 | Portugal | 0–25 | 0–25 | 0–25 | | | 0–75 | Report |

The match was not played due to the cancellation of Tournament 9.

==== Week 4 ====
===== Tournament 10 =====
- Venue: Ittrottar - og Samkomuholl Hall, Tórshavn, Faroe Islands

| Date | Time | | Score | | Set 1 | Set 2 | Set 3 | Set 4 | Set 5 | Total | Report |
|---|---|---|---|---|---|---|---|---|---|---|---|
| 7 Jun | 19:00 | Finland | 3–0 | Faroe Islands | 25–14 | 25–19 | 25–17 | | | 75–50 | Report |
| 8 Jun | 17:00 | Bosnia and Herzegovina | 0–3 | Finland | 0–25 | 0–25 | 0–25 | | | 0–75 | Report |
| 9 Jun | 17:00 | Faroe Islands | 3–0 | Bosnia and Herzegovina | 25–0 | 25–0 | 25–0 | | | 75–0 | Report |

=== Results by round ===
The table listed the results of teams in each round.

| Win | Loss |

| Team ╲ Round | 1 | 2 | 3 | 4 | 5 | 6 |
|---|---|---|---|---|---|---|
| Portugal | W | L | W | W | – | W |
| Montenegro | W | W | W | L | W | – |
| Hungary | W | W | W | W | W | L |
| Finland | W | W | W | W | W | W |
| Latvia | W | L | W | W | L | L |
| Georgia | W | L | L | W | W | W |
| Iceland | L | L | L | L | L | L |
| Luxembourg | L | L | W | L | L | W |
| Faroe Islands | L | L | L | L | L | W |
| Bosnia and Herzegovina | – | – | – | – | – | – |

Source: CEV

=== Final ===
The Final was held in Finland and Portugal.

| Team 1 | Agg. | Team 2 | 1st leg | 2nd leg | Golden Set |
|---|---|---|---|---|---|
| Finland | 1–2 | Portugal | 3–0 | 1–3 | 21–23 |

| Date | Time | | Score | | Set 1 | Set 2 | Set 3 | Set 4 | Set 5 | Total | Report |
|---|---|---|---|---|---|---|---|---|---|---|---|
| 13 Jun | 21:00 | Portugal | 0–3 | Finland | 17–25 | 21–25 | 11–25 | | | 49–75 | Report |
| 16 Jun | 15:00 | Finland | 1–3 | Portugal | 25–21 | 22–25 | 23–25 | 24–26 | | 94–97 | Report |
| Golden set | | Finland | 21–23 | Portugal | | | | | | | |

== Final standing ==
| Rank | Team |
|---|---|
| 1st place, gold medalist(s) | Sweden |
| 2nd place, silver medalist(s) | Czech Republic |
| 3rd place, bronze medalist(s) | Belgium |
| 4 | Romania |
| 5 | Ukraine |
| 6 | Spain |
| 7 | Slovakia |
| 8 | Azerbaijan |
| 9 | Croatia |
| 10 | Slovenia |
| 11 | Estonia |
| 12 | Austria |
| 13 | Portugal |
| 14 | Finland |
| 15 | Hungary |
| 16 | Montenegro |
| 17 | Georgia |
| 18 | Latvia |
| 19 | Luxembourg |
| 20 | Faroe Islands |
| 21 | Iceland |
| – | Bosnia and Herzegovina |

| Qualified for the 2024 Challenger Cup |
| Qualified for the 2024 Challenger Cup via FIVB World Ranking |

2024 European League champions

Sweden
1st title

== See also ==
- 2024 Men's European Volleyball League
