= 2025 Women's European Volleyball League =

European volleyball tournament

- Dates: 29 May – 29 June
- Teams: 21

The 2025 Women's European Volleyball League was the 16th edition of the annual Women's European Volleyball League, which featured women's national volleyball teams from 21 European countries.

The tournament had two divisions: the Golden League, which featured 12 teams, and the Silver League, which featured 9 teams.

== Pools composition ==
Teams were seeded according to their European Ranking for national teams as of 30 August 2024. Rankings are shown in brackets.

=== Golden League ===
The numbers in brackets indicated their CEV rankings.

League phase
Ukraine (8)
Slovakia (12)
Sweden (13)
Slovenia (14)
Spain (15)
Greece (16)
Croatia (17)
Romania (18)
Azerbaijan (19)
Hungary (20)
Portugal (21)
Montenegro (25)

=== Silver League ===
League phase
Austria (22)
Switzerland (26)
Latvia (27)
Israel (29)
Georgia (30)
North Macedonia (32)
Luxembourg (33)
Faroe Islands (34)
Iceland (35)

== Golden League ==
2025 Women's European Volleyball League
Tournament details
- Host country: Sweden (final four)
- Dates: 29 May – 29 June
- Teams: 12
- Runners-up: Hungary
- Third place: Romania
- Fourth place: Sweden

Tournament awards
- MVP: (Ukraine) Daria Sharhorodska

Tournament statistics
- Matches played: 40

=== Schedule ===
The schedule was as follows:

Round	Round date
Week 1	29 May – 1 June 2025
Week 2	6–8 June 2025
Week 3	13–15 June 2025
Final four	28–29 June 2025

=== Tournament schedule ===
Week 1
Tournament 1 (Montenegro) Podgorica	Tournament 2 (Azerbaijan) Baku	Tournament 3 (Greece) Kozani	Tournament 4 (Sweden) Örebro
Montenegro (12) (H); Ukraine (1); Spain (5)	Azerbaijan (9) (H); Slovenia (4); Hungary (10)	Greece (6) (H); Slovakia (2); Croatia (7)	Sweden (3) (H); Romania (8); Portugal (11)
Week 2
Tournament 5 (Portugal) Vila do Conde	Tournament 6 (Romania) Blaj	Tournament 7 (Spain) Alicante	Tournament 8 (Slovakia) Bratislava
Portugal (11) (H); Ukraine (1); Slovenia (4)	Romania (8) (H); Greece (6); Hungary (10)	Spain (5) (H); Sweden (3); Croatia (7)	Slovakia (2) (H); Azerbaijan (9); Montenegro (12)
Week 3
Tournament 9 (Hungary) Kaposvár	Tournament 10 (Croatia) Zadar	Tournament 11 (Slovenia) Velenje	Tournament 12 (Poland) Radom (Note: Due to the Russian invasion of Ukraine, Ukraine's tournament will be held at a neutral venue.)
Hungary (10) (H); Portugal (11); Montenegro (12)	Croatia (7) (H); Romania (8); Azerbaijan (9)	Slovenia (4) (H); Spain (5); Greece (6)	Ukraine (1) (H); Slovakia (2); Sweden (3)

=== Tiebreaker ===
1. Total number of victories (matches won, matches lost)
2. In the event of a tie, the following first tiebreaker will apply: The teams will be ranked by the most point gained per match as follows:
  - Match won 3–0 or 3–1: 3 points for the winner, 0 points for the loser
  - Match won 3–2: 2 points for the winner, 1 point for the loser
  - Match forfeited: 3 points for the winner, 0 points (0–25, 0–25, 0–25) for the loser
3. If teams are still tied after examining the number of victories and points gained, then the FIVB will examine the results in order to break the tie in the following order:
  - Set quotient: if two or more teams are tied on the number of points gained, they will be ranked by the quotient resulting from the division of the number of all set won by the number of all sets lost.
  - Points quotient: if the tie persists based on the set quotient, the teams will be ranked by the quotient resulting from the division of all points scored by the total of points lost during all sets.
  - If the tie persists based on the point quotient, the tie will be broken based on the team that won the match of the Round Robin Phase between the tied teams. When the tie in point quotient is between three or more teams, these teams ranked taking into consideration only the matches involving the teams in question.

=== League round ===
- All times are local.

Pos	Team	Pld	W	L	Pts	SW	SL	SR	SPW	SPL	SPR	Qualification or relegation
1	Romania	6	5	1	16	17	4	4.250	516	405	1.274	Golden League Final four
2	Ukraine	6	5	1	15	15	6	2.500	502	409	1.227	Golden League Final four
3	Sweden (Note: Qualified as final four host)	6	5	1	14	15	6	2.500	486	443	1.097	Golden League Final four
4	Hungary	6	5	1	13	15	9	1.667	529	526	1.006	Golden League Final four
5	Slovenia	6	4	2	11	13	9	1.444	500	471	1.062	
6	Slovakia	6	3	3	9	9	10	0.900	403	397	1.015	
7	Greece	6	2	4	8	12	13	0.923	582	552	1.054	
8	Croatia	6	2	4	7	10	14	0.714	509	536	0.950	
9	Spain	6	2	4	6	9	13	0.692	486	505	0.962	
10	Portugal	6	2	4	6	9	14	0.643	492	546	0.901	
11	Montenegro	6	1	5	3	6	16	0.375	429	522	0.822	
12	Azerbaijan	6	0	6	0	2	18	0.111	363	485	0.748	Relegation to Silver League

Source: CEV

==== Week 1 ====
===== Tournament 1 =====
- Venue: Verde Complex, Podgorica, Montenegro

Date	Time		Score		Set 1	Set 2	Set 3	Set 4	Set 5	Total	Report
30 May	18:00	Spain	3–0	Montenegro	25–20	25–16	25–17			75–53	Report
31 May	18:00	Ukraine	3–1	Spain	25–16	20–25	25–16	25–15		95–72	Report
1 Jun	18:00	Montenegro	1–3	Ukraine	20–25	25–21	18–25	12–25		75–96	Report

===== Tournament 2 =====
- Venue: A.Y.S. Sport Hall, Baku, Azerbaijan

Date	Time		Score		Set 1	Set 2	Set 3	Set 4	Set 5	Total	Report
30 May	18:00	Hungary	3–0	Azerbaijan	25–13	25–22	25–20			75–55	Report
31 May	18:00	Slovenia	3–0	Hungary	25–17	25–14	25–17			75–48	Report
1 Jun	18:00	Azerbaijan	0–3	Slovenia	16–25	19–25	23–25			58–75	Report

===== Tournament 3 =====
- Venue: Kozani New Indoor Sport Hall, Kozani, Greece

Date	Time		Score		Set 1	Set 2	Set 3	Set 4	Set 5	Total	Report
30 May	21:00	Croatia	3–1	Greece	23–25	25–19	25–23	25–21		98–88	Report
31 May	19:00	Slovakia	3–1	Croatia	25–22	21–25	25–20	25–17		96–84	Report
1 Jun	19:00	Greece	3–0	Slovakia	25–20	25–21	25–19			75–60	Report

===== Tournament 4 =====
- Venue: Idrottshuset, Örebro, Sweden

Date	Time		Score		Set 1	Set 2	Set 3	Set 4	Set 5	Total	Report
29 May	16:00	Portugal	1–3	Sweden	25–23	20–25	24–26	19–25		88–99	Report
30 May	18:00	Romania	3–0	Portugal	25–17	25–17	25–10			75–44	Report
31 May	16:00	Sweden	0–3	Romania	18–25	17–25	18–25			53–75	Report

==== Week 2 ====
===== Tournament 5 =====
- Venue: Pavilhão de Desportos de Vila do Conde, Vila do Conde, Portugal

Date	Time		Score		Set 1	Set 2	Set 3	Set 4	Set 5	Total	Report
6 Jun	21:00	Ukraine	3–1	Portugal	25–13	25–20	23–25	25–18		98–76	Report
7 Jun	17:00	Slovenia	0–3	Ukraine	23–25	16–25	22–25			61–75	Report
8 Jun	15:00	Portugal	3–1	Slovenia	25–21	24–26	26–24	25–19		100–90	Report

===== Tournament 6 =====
- Venue: Sala Polivalentă, Blaj, Romania

Date	Time		Score		Set 1	Set 2	Set 3	Set 4	Set 5	Total	Report
6 Jun	16:30	Hungary	3–2	Romania	21–25	23–25	25–21	25–21	20–18	114–110	Report
7 Jun	16:30	Greece	2–3	Hungary	23–25	25–10	23–25	25–18	16–18	112–96	Report
8 Jun	16:30	Romania	3–1	Greece	26–28	25–22	26–24	29–27		106–101	Report

===== Tournament 7 =====
- Venue: Pabellón Pedro Ferrándiz, Alicante, Spain

Date	Time		Score		Set 1	Set 2	Set 3	Set 4	Set 5	Total	Report
6 Jun	19:00	Croatia	1–3	Spain	25–20	19–25	21–25	17–25		82–95	Report
7 Jun	18:00	Sweden	3–2	Croatia	25–23	23–25	25–17	17–25	15–9	105–99	Report
8 Jun	18:00	Spain	0–3	Sweden	23–25	21–25	26–28			70–78	Report

===== Tournament 8 =====
- Venue: Gopass Arena, Bratislava, Slovakia

Date	Time		Score		Set 1	Set 2	Set 3	Set 4	Set 5	Total	Report
6 Jun	20:00	Azerbaijan	0–3	Slovakia	20–25	12–25	20–25			52–75	Report
7 Jun	18:00	Montenegro	3–1	Azerbaijan	25–18	16–25	25–19	25–18		91–80	Report
8 Jun	18:00	Slovakia	3–0	Montenegro	25–16	25–7	25–13			75–36	Report

==== Week 3 ====
===== Tournament 9 =====
- Venue: Kaposvár Aréna, Kaposvár, Hungary

Date	Time		Score		Set 1	Set 2	Set 3	Set 4	Set 5	Total	Report
13 Jun	18:00	Montenegro	1–3	Hungary	20–25	25–23	23–25	20–25		88–98	Report
14 Jun	18:00	Portugal	3–1	Montenegro	23–25	25–18	25–21	25–22		98–86	Report
15 Jun	18:00	Hungary	3–1	Portugal	25–20	25–18	23–25	25–23		98–86	Report

===== Tournament 10 =====
- Venue: Krešimir Ćosić Hall, Zadar, Croatia

Date	Time		Score		Set 1	Set 2	Set 3	Set 4	Set 5	Total	Report
13 Jun	16:30	Azerbaijan	1–3	Croatia	25–19	15–25	17–25	20–25		77–94	Report
14 Jun	16:30	Romania	3–0	Azerbaijan	25–14	25–10	25–17			75–41	Report
15 Jun	16:30	Croatia	0–3	Romania	18–25	15–25	19–25			52–75	Report

===== Tournament 11 =====
- Venue: Rdeča dvorana, Velenje, Slovenia

Date	Time		Score		Set 1	Set 2	Set 3	Set 4	Set 5	Total	Report
13 Jun	18:00	Greece	2–3	Slovenia	23–25	25–20	19–25	25–20	11–15	103–105	Report
14 Jun	17:00	Spain	1–3	Greece	16–25	30–28	19–25	22–25		87–103	Report
15 Jun	18:00	Slovenia	3–1	Spain	19–25	25–22	25–18	25–22		94–87	Report

===== Tournament 12 =====
- Venue: Radomskie Centrum Sportu, Radom, Poland

Date	Time		Score		Set 1	Set 2	Set 3	Set 4	Set 5	Total	Report
13 Jun	19:00	Sweden	3–0	Ukraine	25–20	26–24	25–19			76–63	Report
14 Jun	19:00	Slovakia	0–3	Sweden	21–25	13–25	14–25			48–75	Report
15 Jun	17:00	Ukraine	3–0	Slovakia	25–12	25–21	25–16			75–49	Report

=== Results by round ===
The table listed the results of teams in each round.

Win	Loss

Team ╲ Round	1	2	3	4	5	6
Ukraine	W	W	W	W	L	W
Slovakia	W	L	W	W	L	L
Sweden	W	L	W	W	W	W
Slovenia	W	W	L	L	W	W
Spain	W	L	W	L	L	L
Greece	L	W	L	L	L	W
Croatia	W	L	L	L	W	L
Romania	W	W	L	W	W	W
Azerbaijan	L	L	L	L	L	L
Hungary	W	L	W	W	W	W
Portugal	L	L	L	W	W	L
Montenegro	L	L	W	L	L	L

Source: CEV

=== Final four ===
The Final four was held in Sweden.

Semifinals
28 June
Romania	2
Hungary	3
28 June
Ukraine	3
Sweden	0

Final
29 June
Hungary	1
Ukraine	3
3rd place match
29 June
Romania	3
Sweden	2

==== Semifinals ====
Date	Time		Score		Set 1	Set 2	Set 3	Set 4	Set 5	Total	Report
28 Jun	16:00	Romania	2–3	Hungary	25–10	22–25	12–25	25–16	9–15	93–91	Report
28 Jun	19:00	Ukraine	3–0	Sweden	25–19	25–20	25–18			75–57	Report

==== 3rd place match ====
Date	Time		Score		Set 1	Set 2	Set 3	Set 4	Set 5	Total	Report
29 Jun	16:00	Romania	3–2	Sweden	17–25	25–20	21–25	26–24	15–13	104–107	Report

==== Final ====
Date	Time		Score		Set 1	Set 2	Set 3	Set 4	Set 5	Total	Report
29 Jun	19:00	Hungary	1–3	Ukraine	16–25	25–23	16–25	17–25		74–98	Report

== Silver League ==
2025 Women's European Volleyball League
Tournament details
- Host country: Latvia / Switzerland (final)
- Dates: 30 May – 29 June
- Teams: 9
- Runners-up: Latvia
- Third place: Austria
- Fourth place: Israel

Tournament statistics
- Matches played: 29

=== Schedule ===
The schedule was as follows:

Round	Round date
Week 1	30 May – 1 June 2025
Week 2	6–8 June 2025
Week 3	13–15 June 2025
Final	26 & 29 June 2025

=== Tournament schedule ===
Week 1
Tournament 1 (Iceland) Kópavogur	Tournament 2 (North Macedonia) Strumica	Tournament 3 (Latvia) Jelgava
Iceland (9) (H); Austria (1); Georgia (5)	North Macedonia (6) (H); Switzerland (2); Luxembourg (7)	Latvia (3) (H); Israel (4); Faroe Islands (8)
Week 2
Tournament 4 (Faroe Islands) Sandur	Tournament 5 (Georgia (country)) Tbilisi	Tournament 6 (Switzerland) Schönenwerd
Faroe Islands (8) (H); Austria (1); North Macedonia (6)	Georgia (5) (H); Latvia (3); Luxembourg (7)	Switzerland (2) (H); Israel (4); Iceland (9)
Week 3
Tournament 7 Luxembourg	Tournament 8 (North Macedonia) Strumica (Note: Due to the Gaza war, Israel's tournament will be held at a neutral venue.)	Tournament 9 (Austria) Amstetten
Luxembourg (7) (H); Faroe Islands (8); Iceland (9)	Israel (4) (H); Georgia (5); North Macedonia (6)	Austria (1) (H); Switzerland (2); Latvia (3)

=== Tiebreaker ===
1. Total number of victories (matches won, matches lost)
2. In the event of a tie, the following first tiebreaker will apply: The teams will be ranked by the most point gained per match as follows:
  - Match won 3–0 or 3–1: 3 points for the winner, 0 points for the loser
  - Match won 3–2: 2 points for the winner, 1 point for the loser
  - Match forfeited: 3 points for the winner, 0 points (0–25, 0–25, 0–25) for the loser
3. If teams are still tied after examining the number of victories and points gained, then the FIVB will examine the results in order to break the tie in the following order:
  - Set quotient: if two or more teams are tied on the number of points gained, they will be ranked by the quotient resulting from the division of the number of all set won by the number of all sets lost.
  - Points quotient: if the tie persists based on the set quotient, the teams will be ranked by the quotient resulting from the division of all points scored by the total of points lost during all sets.
  - If the tie persists based on the point quotient, the tie will be broken based on the team that won the match of the Round Robin Phase between the tied teams. When the tie in point quotient is between three or more teams, these teams ranked taking into consideration only the matches involving the teams in question.

=== League round ===
- All times are local.

Pos	Team	Pld	W	L	Pts	SW	SL	SR	SPW	SPL	SPR	Qualification
1	Switzerland	6	6	0	18	18	0	MAX	453	281	1.612	Silver League Final
2	Latvia	6	4	2	13	14	8	1.750	502	432	1.162	Silver League Final
3	Austria	6	4	2	12	14	8	1.750	495	415	1.193	
4	Israel	6	4	2	11	12	8	1.500	440	392	1.122	
5	Georgia	6	3	3	8	12	14	0.857	555	584	0.950	
6	Iceland	6	3	3	7	9	13	0.692	439	485	0.905	
7	North Macedonia	6	2	4	7	9	12	0.750	402	447	0.899	
8	Luxembourg	6	1	5	5	7	15	0.467	411	501	0.820	
9	Faroe Islands	6	0	6	0	1	18	0.056	318	478	0.665	

Source: CEV

==== Week 1 ====
===== Tournament 1 =====
- Venue: Digranes Sports Hall, Kópavogur, Iceland

Date	Time		Score		Set 1	Set 2	Set 3	Set 4	Set 5	Total	Report
30 May	17:00	Georgia	2–3	Iceland	25–19	13–25	23–25	28–26	14–16	103–111	Report
31 May	15:00	Austria	2–3	Georgia	26–28	23–25	25–13	27–25	13–15	114–106	Report
1 Jun	15:00	Iceland	0–3	Austria	16–25	15–25	17–25			48–75	Report

===== Tournament 2 =====
- Venue: Park Sports Hall, Strumica, North Macedonia

Date	Time		Score		Set 1	Set 2	Set 3	Set 4	Set 5	Total	Report
30 May	20:00	Luxembourg	0–3	North Macedonia	16–25	19–25	14–25			49–75	Report
31 May	20:00	Switzerland	3–0	Luxembourg	25–11	25–13	25–14			75–38	Report
1 Jun	20:00	North Macedonia	0–3	Switzerland	7–25	16–25	6–25			29–75	Report

===== Tournament 3 =====
- Venue: Zemgale Olympic Center, Jelgava, Latvia

Date	Time		Score		Set 1	Set 2	Set 3	Set 4	Set 5	Total	Report
30 May	19:00	Faroe Islands	1–3	Latvia	11–25	30–28	17–25	15–25		73–103	Report
31 May	20:00	Israel	3–0	Faroe Islands	25–14	25–19	25–14			75–47	Report
1 Jun	17:00	Latvia	3–0	Israel	25–17	25–19	25–13			75–49	Report

==== Week 2 ====
===== Tournament 4 =====
- Venue: Høllin inni í Dal, Sandur, Faroe Islands

Date	Time		Score		Set 1	Set 2	Set 3	Set 4	Set 5	Total	Report
6 Jun	19:00	North Macedonia	3–0	Faroe Islands	25–11	25–21	25–16			75–48	Report
7 Jun	17:00	Austria	3–0	North Macedonia	25–12	25–12	25–20			75–44	Report
8 Jun	17:00	Faroe Islands	0–3	Austria	13–25	9–25	22–25			44–75	Report

===== Tournament 5 =====
- Venue: (Georgia (country)) Tbilisi Sports Palace Small Hall, Tbilisi, Georgia

Date	Time		Score		Set 1	Set 2	Set 3	Set 4	Set 5	Total	Report
6 Jun	19:00	Luxembourg	2–3	Georgia	25–21	29–31	15–25	25–22	8–15	102–114	Report
7 Jun	19:00	Latvia	3–0	Luxembourg	25–17	25–17	25–11			75–45	Report
8 Jun	19:00	Georgia	1–3	Latvia	25–16	23–25	21–25	18–25		87–91	Report

===== Tournament 6 =====
- Venue: Betoncoupe Arena, Schönenwerd, Switzerland

Date	Time		Score		Set 1	Set 2	Set 3	Set 4	Set 5	Total	Report
6 Jun	19:00	Iceland	0–3	Switzerland	10–25	14–25	16–25			40–75	Report
7 Jun	17:00	Israel	3–0	Iceland	25–20	25–18	25–16			75–54	Report
8 Jun	17:00	Switzerland	3–0	Israel	25–18	28–26	25–17			78–61	Report

==== Week 3 ====
===== Tournament 7 =====
- Venue: d'Coque, Luxembourg City, Luxembourg

Date	Time		Score		Set 1	Set 2	Set 3	Set 4	Set 5	Total	Report
13 Jun	20:00	Iceland	3–2	Luxembourg	25–22	21–25	24–26	25–15	16–14	111–102	Report
14 Jun	20:00	Faroe Islands	0–3	Iceland	19–25	18–25	18–25			55–75	Report
15 Jun	18:00	Luxembourg	3–0	Faroe Islands	25–20	25–11	25–20			75–51	Report

===== Tournament 8 =====
- Venue: Park Sports Hall, Strumica, North Macedonia

Date	Time		Score		Set 1	Set 2	Set 3	Set 4	Set 5	Total	Report
13 Jun	19:00	North Macedonia	2–3	Israel	14–25	25–18	25–22	14–25	10–15	88–105	Report
14 Jun	19:00	Georgia	3–1	North Macedonia	20–25	25–21	25–23	25–22		95–91	Report
15 Jun	19:00	Israel	3–0	Georgia	25–14	25–18	25–18			75–50	Report

===== Tournament 9 =====
- Venue: Johann Pölz Halle, Amstetten, Austria

Date	Time		Score		Set 1	Set 2	Set 3	Set 4	Set 5	Total	Report
13 Jun	17:35	Latvia	2–3	Austria	16–25	23–25	25–19	25–19	9–15	98–103	Report
14 Jun	17:35	Switzerland	3–0	Latvia	25–19	25–18	25–23			75–60	Report
15 Jun	17:35	Austria	0–3	Switzerland	19–25	16–25	18–25			53–75	Report

=== Results by round ===
The table listed the results of teams in each round.

Win	Loss

Team ╲ Round	1	2	3	4	5	6
Austria	L	W	W	W	W	L
Switzerland	W	W	W	W	W	W
Latvia	W	W	W	W	L	L
Israel	W	L	W	L	W	W
Georgia	L	W	W	L	W	L
North Macedonia	W	L	W	L	L	L
Luxembourg	L	L	L	L	L	W
Faroe Islands	L	L	L	L	L	L
Iceland	W	L	L	L	W	W

Source: CEV

=== Final ===
Team 1	Agg.	Team 2	1st leg	2nd leg
Switzerland	4–2	Latvia	2–3	3–0

Date	Time		Score		Set 1	Set 2	Set 3	Set 4	Set 5	Total	Report
26 Jun	19:45	Latvia	3–2	Switzerland	25–17	21–25	32–30	22–25	15–8	115–105	Report
29 Jun	17:00	Switzerland	3–0	Latvia	25–20	25–20	25–19			75–59	Report

== Final standing ==
Rank	Team
1st place, gold medalist(s)	Ukraine
2nd place, silver medalist(s)	Hungary
3rd place, bronze medalist(s)	Romania
4	Sweden
5	Slovenia
6	Slovakia
7	Greece
8	Croatia
9	Spain
10	Portugal
11	Montenegro
12	Azerbaijan
13	Switzerland
14	Latvia
15	Austria
16	Israel
17	Georgia
18	Iceland
19	North Macedonia
20	Luxembourg
21	Faroe Islands

2025 European League champions

Ukraine
3rd title

== See also ==
- 2025 Men's European Volleyball League
