= 2021 Women's European Volleyball League =

European volleyball tournament

2021 Women's European League
Tournament details
- Host country: Final Four: Bulgaria (Golden League); Slovenia (Silver League)
- Dates: 28 May – 20 June
- Teams: 20

Final positions
- Champions: Bulgaria (2nd title)
- Runners-up: Croatia
- Third place: Spain
- Fourth place: Czech Republic

The 2021 Women's European Volleyball League was the 12th edition of the annual Women's European Volleyball League, which features women's national volleyball teams from 20 European countries.

The tournament had two divisions: the Golden League, featuring twelve teams, and the Silver League, featuring eight teams.

== Pools composition ==
Teams were seeded following the serpentine system according to their European Ranking for national teams as of January 2020. Rankings are shown in brackets.

=== Golden league ===
| Pool A | Pool B | Pool C |
|---|---|---|
| Azerbaijan (5) | Bulgaria (8) | Croatia (9) |
| Spain (14) | Ukraine (13) | Belarus (11) |
| Romania (15) | Slovakia (15) | Hungary (17) |
| France (20) | ~~Finland (21)~~ | Czech Republic (19) |

=== Silver league ===
| Pool A | Pool B |
|---|---|
| Slovenia (18) | Portugal (23) |
| Austria (27) | Estonia (25) |
| Israel (29) | Bosnia and Herzegovina (30) |
| Luxembourg (36) | Latvia (30) |

== Pool standing procedure ==
1. Total number of victories (matches won, matches lost)
2. In the event of a tie, the following first tiebreaker will apply: The teams will be ranked by the most point gained per match as follows:
  - Match won 3–0 or 3–1: 3 points for the winner, 0 points for the loser
  - Match won 3–2: 2 points for the winner, 1 point for the loser
  - Match forfeited: 3 points for the winner, 0 points (0–25, 0–25, 0–25) for the loser
3. If teams are still tied after examining the number of victories and points gained, then the FIVB will examine the results in order to break the tie in the following order:
  - Set quotient: if two or more teams are tied on the number of points gained, they will be ranked by the quotient resulting from the division of the number of all set won by the number of all sets lost.
  - Points quotient: if the tie persists based on the set quotient, the teams will be ranked by the quotient resulting from the division of all points scored by the total of points lost during all sets.
  - If the tie persists based on the point quotient, the tie will be broken based on the team that won the match of the Round Robin Phase between the tied teams. When the tie in point quotient is between three or more teams, these teams ranked taking into consideration only the matches involving the teams in question.

== Golden league ==
- All times are local.

=== Pool A ===
| Pos | Team | Pld | W | L | Pts | SW | SL | SR | SPW | SPL | SPR | Qualification |
|---|---|---|---|---|---|---|---|---|---|---|---|---|
| 1 | Spain | 6 | 4 | 2 | 13 | 16 | 10 | 1.600 | 570 | 518 | 1.100 | Final round |
| 2 | France | 6 | 4 | 2 | 12 | 15 | 9 | 1.667 | 535 | 491 | 1.090 | |
| 3 | Romania | 6 | 4 | 2 | 11 | 14 | 10 | 1.400 | 520 | 487 | 1.068 | |
| 4 | Azerbaijan | 6 | 0 | 6 | 0 | 2 | 18 | 0.111 | 365 | 494 | 0.739 | Relegated to the Silver League |

| Date | Time | | Score | | Set 1 | Set 2 | Set 3 | Set 4 | Set 5 | Total | Report |
|---|---|---|---|---|---|---|---|---|---|---|---|
| 28 May | 17:00 | Romania | 3–2 | France | 17–25 | 23–25 | 26–24 | 26–24 | 15–11 | 107–109 | Report |
| 28 May | 20:00 | Spain | 3–0 | Azerbaijan | 25–22 | 25–22 | 25–12 | | | 75–56 | Report |
| 29 May | 17:00 | Azerbaijan | 0–3 | Romania | 14–25 | 13–25 | 11–25 | | | 38–75 | Report |
| 29 May | 20:00 | Spain | 3–1 | France | 25–18 | 22–25 | 25–18 | 25–23 | | 97–84 | Report |
| 30 May | 17:00 | Romania | 2–3 | Spain | 25–13 | 14–25 | 25–21 | 16–25 | 9–15 | 89–99 | Report |
| 30 May | 20:00 | France | 3–1 | Azerbaijan | 25–21 | 19–25 | 25–13 | 25–20 | | 94–79 | Report |
| 4 Jun | 17:00 | Spain | 3–1 | Azerbaijan | 25–19 | 22–25 | 25–21 | 25–13 | | 97–78 | Report |
| 4 Jun | 20:00 | Romania | 0–3 | France | 17–25 | 18–25 | 23–25 | | | 58–75 | Report |
| 5 Jun | 17:00 | Romania | 3–2 | Spain | 24–26 | 24–26 | 25–20 | 25–21 | 15–12 | 113–105 | Report |
| 5 Jun | 20:30 | France | 3–0 | Azerbaijan | 25–14 | 25–19 | 25–20 | | | 75–53 | Report |
| 6 Jun | 15:00 | Azerbaijan | 0–3 | Romania | 24–26 | 12–25 | 25–27 | | | 61–78 | Report |
| 6 Jun | 19:00 | Spain | 2–3 | France | 25–16 | 23–25 | 25–17 | 14–25 | 10–15 | 97–98 | Report |

=== Pool B ===
| Pos | Team | Pld | W | L | Pts | SW | SL | SR | SPW | SPL | SPR | Qualification |
|---|---|---|---|---|---|---|---|---|---|---|---|---|
| 1 | Bulgaria (Note: Qualified as hosts) (H) | 4 | 4 | 0 | 12 | 12 | 0 | MAX | 304 | 226 | 1.345 | Final round |
| 2 | Slovakia | 4 | 1 | 3 | 4 | 5 | 10 | 0.500 | 307 | 332 | 0.925 | |
| 3 | Ukraine | 4 | 1 | 3 | 2 | 4 | 11 | 0.364 | 297 | 350 | 0.849 | |

(H) Host
Notes:

| Date | Time | | Score | | Set 1 | Set 2 | Set 3 | Set 4 | Set 5 | Total | Report |
|---|---|---|---|---|---|---|---|---|---|---|---|
| 28 May | 19:00 | Bulgaria | 3–0 | Slovakia | 25–14 | 26–24 | 25–15 | | | 76–53 | Report |
| 29 May | 19:00 | Slovakia | 2–3 | Ukraine | 25–22 | 22–25 | 25–14 | 15–25 | 7–15 | 94–101 | Report |
| 30 May | 19:00 | Ukraine | 0–3 | Bulgaria | 26–28 | 13–25 | 22–25 | | | 61–78 | Report |
| 4 Jun | 20:30 | Bulgaria | 3–0 | Slovakia | 25–21 | 25–14 | 25–22 | | | 75–57 | Report |
| 5 Jun | 20:30 | Ukraine | 0–3 | Bulgaria | 23–25 | 20–25 | 12–25 | | | 55–75 | Report |
| 6 Jun | 17:30 | Slovakia | 3–1 | Ukraine | 23–25 | 30–28 | 25–14 | 25–13 | | 103–80 | Report |

=== Pool C ===
| Pos | Team | Pld | W | L | Pts | SW | SL | SR | SPW | SPL | SPR | Qualification |
|---|---|---|---|---|---|---|---|---|---|---|---|---|
| 1 | Czech Republic | 6 | 4 | 2 | 14 | 16 | 8 | 2.000 | 552 | 479 | 1.152 | Final round |
| 2 | Croatia | 6 | 4 | 2 | 11 | 15 | 10 | 1.500 | 561 | 542 | 1.035 | Final round |
| 3 | Belarus | 6 | 2 | 4 | 6 | 9 | 15 | 0.600 | 468 | 540 | 0.867 | |
| 4 | Hungary | 6 | 2 | 4 | 5 | 7 | 14 | 0.500 | 454 | 474 | 0.958 | |

| Date | Time | | Score | | Set 1 | Set 2 | Set 3 | Set 4 | Set 5 | Total | Report |
|---|---|---|---|---|---|---|---|---|---|---|---|
| 28 May | 17:00 | Croatia | 2–3 | Hungary | 26–24 | 20–25 | 31–29 | 21–25 | 11–15 | 109–118 | Report |
| 29 May | 16:00 | Czech Republic | 3–1 | Croatia | 25–13 | 20–25 | 28–26 | 25–22 | | 98–86 | Report |
| 29 May | 19:00 | Hungary | 1–3 | Belarus | 19–25 | 24–26 | 25–16 | 22–25 | | 90–92 | Report |
| 30 May | 16:00 | Belarus | 0–3 | Croatia | 23–25 | 15–25 | 20–25 | | | 58–75 | Report |
| 30 May | 19:00 | Hungary | 0–3 | Czech Republic | 16–25 | 17–25 | 16–25 | | | 49–75 | Report |
| 31 May | 17:00 | Belarus | 1–3 | Czech Republic | 7–25 | 25–22 | 12–25 | 21–25 | | 65–97 | Report |
| 2 Jun | 16:00 | Belarus | 2–3 | Croatia | 23–25 | 25–16 | 16–25 | 26–24 | 9–15 | 99–105 | Report |
| 2 Jun | 19:00 | Hungary | 0–3 | Czech Republic | 21–25 | 21–25 | 20–25 | | | 62–75 | Report |
| 3 Jun | 16:00 | Hungary | 3–0 | Belarus | 25–14 | 25–18 | 25–16 | | | 75–48 | Report |
| 3 Jun | 19:00 | Czech Republic | 2–3 | Croatia | 25–20 | 25–27 | 21–25 | 26–24 | 12–15 | 109–111 | Report |
| 4 Jun | 17:00 | Croatia | 3–0 | Hungary | 25–21 | 25–16 | 25–23 | | | 75–60 | Report |
| 4 Jun | 20:00 | Belarus | 3–2 | Czech Republic | 25–22 | 25–18 | 20–25 | 21–25 | 15–8 | 106–98 | Report |

=== Ranking of the second placed teams ===
- Matches against the fourth placed team in each pool are not included in this ranking.

| Pos | Team | Pld | W | L | Pts | SW | SL | SR | SPW | SPL | SPR | Qualification |
|---|---|---|---|---|---|---|---|---|---|---|---|---|
| 1 | Croatia | 4 | 3 | 1 | 7 | 10 | 7 | 1.429 | 377 | 364 | 1.036 | Final round |
| 2 | France | 4 | 2 | 2 | 6 | 9 | 8 | 1.125 | 366 | 359 | 1.019 | |
| 3 | Slovakia | 4 | 1 | 3 | 4 | 5 | 10 | 0.500 | 307 | 332 | 0.925 | |

== Silver league ==
- All times are local.

=== Pool A ===
| Pos | Team | Pld | W | L | Pts | SW | SL | SR | SPW | SPL | SPR | Qualification |
|---|---|---|---|---|---|---|---|---|---|---|---|---|
| 1 | Slovenia (Note: Qualified as hosts) (H) | 6 | 6 | 0 | 17 | 18 | 3 | 6.000 | 513 | 374 | 1.372 | Final round |
| 2 | Austria | 6 | 4 | 2 | 13 | 14 | 6 | 2.333 | 479 | 400 | 1.198 | Final round |
| 3 | Israel | 6 | 2 | 4 | 6 | 7 | 12 | 0.583 | 378 | 448 | 0.844 | |
| 4 | Luxembourg | 6 | 0 | 6 | 0 | 0 | 18 | 0.000 | 302 | 450 | 0.671 | |

(H) Host
Notes:

| Date | Time | | Score | | Set 1 | Set 2 | Set 3 | Set 4 | Set 5 | Total | Report |
|---|---|---|---|---|---|---|---|---|---|---|---|
| 27 May | 15:00 | Austria | 0–3 | Slovenia | 17–25 | 17–25 | 20–25 | | | 54–75 | Report |
| 28 May | 15:00 | Israel | 0–3 | Austria | 16–25 | 11–25 | 21–25 | | | 48–75 | Report |
| 28 May | 17:30 | Luxembourg | 0–3 | Slovenia | 14–25 | 13–25 | 16–25 | | | 43–75 | Report |
| 29 May | 15:00 | Israel | 3–0 | Luxembourg | 25–23 | 25–19 | 25–22 | | | 75–64 | Report |
| 30 May | 15:00 | Slovenia | 3–0 | Israel | 25–14 | 25–15 | 25–11 | | | 75–40 | Report |
| 30 May | 17:30 | Austria | 3–0 | Luxembourg | 25–19 | 25–15 | 25–13 | | | 75–47 | Report |
| 4 Jun | 17:00 | Austria | 3–0 | Luxembourg | 25–15 | 25–14 | 25–20 | | | 75–49 | Report |
| 4 Jun | 20:00 | Slovenia | 3–1 | Israel | 22–25 | 25–11 | 25–19 | 25–20 | | 97–75 | Report |
| 5 Jun | 17:00 | Israel | 0–3 | Austria | 18–25 | 32–34 | 15–25 | | | 65–84 | Report |
| 5 Jun | 20:00 | Luxembourg | 0–3 | Slovenia | 14–25 | 19–25 | 13–25 | | | 46–75 | Report |
| 6 Jun | 17:00 | Israel | 3–0 | Luxembourg | 25–23 | 25–16 | 25–14 | | | 75–53 | Report |
| 6 Jun | 20:00 | Austria | 2–3 | Slovenia | 22–25 | 22–25 | 32–30 | 25–19 | 15–17 | 116–116 | Report |

=== Pool B ===
| Pos | Team | Pld | W | L | Pts | SW | SL | SR | SPW | SPL | SPR | Qualification |
|---|---|---|---|---|---|---|---|---|---|---|---|---|
| 1 | Portugal | 6 | 5 | 1 | 14 | 15 | 7 | 2.143 | 515 | 471 | 1.093 | Final round |
| 2 | Bosnia and Herzegovina | 6 | 4 | 2 | 13 | 15 | 6 | 2.500 | 491 | 393 | 1.249 | Final round |
| 3 | Estonia | 6 | 3 | 3 | 9 | 12 | 12 | 1.000 | 516 | 536 | 0.963 | |
| 4 | Latvia | 6 | 0 | 6 | 0 | 1 | 18 | 0.056 | 353 | 475 | 0.743 | |

| Date | Time | | Score | | Set 1 | Set 2 | Set 3 | Set 4 | Set 5 | Total | Report |
|---|---|---|---|---|---|---|---|---|---|---|---|
| 28 May | 17:00 | Bosnia and Herzegovina | 3–0 | Latvia | 25–19 | 25–20 | 25–18 | | | 75–57 | Report |
| 28 May | 20:00 | Estonia | 2–3 | Portugal | 25–19 | 23–25 | 25–23 | 27–29 | 11–15 | 111–111 | Report |
| 29 May | 17:00 | Latvia | 0–3 | Portugal | 18–25 | 19–25 | 21–25 | | | 58–75 | Report |
| 29 May | 20:00 | Bosnia and Herzegovina | 2–3 | Estonia | 25–12 | 22–25 | 21–25 | 25–22 | 9–15 | 102–99 | Report |
| 30 May | 17:00 | Estonia | 3–0 | Latvia | 25–18 | 25–22 | 25–19 | | | 75–59 | Report |
| 30 May | 20:00 | Portugal | 0–3 | Bosnia and Herzegovina | 21–25 | 23–25 | 19–25 | | | 63–75 | Report |
| 1 Jun | 17:00 | Estonia | 1–3 | Portugal | 26–24 | 19–25 | 19–25 | 20–25 | | 84–99 | Report |
| 1 Jun | 20:00 | Bosnia and Herzegovina | 3–0 | Latvia | 25–12 | 25–8 | 25–15 | | | 75–35 | Report |
| 2 Jun | 17:00 | Latvia | 0–3 | Portugal | 14–25 | 21–25 | 19–25 | | | 54–75 | Report |
| 2 Jun | 20:00 | Bosnia and Herzegovina | 3–0 | Estonia | 25–9 | 25–18 | 25–20 | | | 75–47 | Report |
| 3 Jun | 17:00 | Estonia | 3–1 | Latvia | 26–24 | 24–26 | 25–22 | 25–18 | | 100–90 | Report |
| 3 Jun | 20:00 | Portugal | 3–1 | Bosnia and Herzegovina | 25–21 | 17–25 | 25–20 | 25–23 | | 92–89 | Report |

== Final round ==
=== Silver League ===
- Venue: Maribor, Slovenia
- All times are Central European Summer Time (UTC+02:00).

Semifinals
11 June
Portugal | 2
Austria | 3
11 June
Slovenia | 1
Bosnia and Herzegovina | 3

Final
12 June
Austria | 2
Bosnia and Herzegovina | 3
3rd place match
12 June
Portugal | 1
Slovenia | 3

==== Semifinals ====
| Date | Time | | Score | | Set 1 | Set 2 | Set 3 | Set 4 | Set 5 | Total | Report |
|---|---|---|---|---|---|---|---|---|---|---|---|
| 11 Jun | 17:00 | Portugal | 2–3 | Austria | 23–25 | 25–23 | 25–22 | 20–25 | 6–15 | 99–110 | Report |
| 11 Jun | 20:00 | Slovenia | 1–3 | Bosnia and Herzegovina | 23–25 | 25–19 | 22–25 | 24–26 | | 94–95 | Report |

==== 3rd place ====
| Date | Time | | Score | | Set 1 | Set 2 | Set 3 | Set 4 | Set 5 | Total | Report |
|---|---|---|---|---|---|---|---|---|---|---|---|
| 12 Jun | 17:00 | Portugal | 1–3 | Slovenia | 21–25 | 25–23 | 23–25 | 16–25 | | 85–98 | Report |

==== Final ====
| Date | Time | | Score | | Set 1 | Set 2 | Set 3 | Set 4 | Set 5 | Total | Report |
|---|---|---|---|---|---|---|---|---|---|---|---|
| 12 Jun | 20:00 | Austria | 2–3 | Bosnia and Herzegovina | 22–25 | 29–27 | 25–23 | 18–25 | 7–15 | 101–115 | Report |

=== Golden League ===
- Venue: Ruse, Bulgaria
- All times are Eastern European Summer Time (UTC+03:00).

Semifinals
19 June
Spain | 1
Croatia | 3
19 June
Czech Republic | 0
Bulgaria | 3

Final
20 June
Croatia | 1
Bulgaria | 3
3rd place match
20 June
Spain | 3
Czech Republic | 2

==== Semifinals ====
| Date | Time | | Score | | Set 1 | Set 2 | Set 3 | Set 4 | Set 5 | Total | Report |
|---|---|---|---|---|---|---|---|---|---|---|---|
| 19 Jun | 17:00 | Spain | 1–3 | Croatia | 12–25 | 25–10 | 18–25 | 23–25 | | 78–85 | Report |
| 19 Jun | 20:00 | Czech Republic | 0–3 | Bulgaria | 13–25 | 23–25 | 19–25 | | | 55–75 | Report |

==== 3rd place ====
| Date | Time | | Score | | Set 1 | Set 2 | Set 3 | Set 4 | Set 5 | Total | Report |
|---|---|---|---|---|---|---|---|---|---|---|---|
| 20 Jun | 17:00 | Spain | 3–2 | Czech Republic | 28–26 | 10–25 | 23–25 | 25–16 | 15–10 | 101–102 | Report |

==== Final ====
| Date | Time | | Score | | Set 1 | Set 2 | Set 3 | Set 4 | Set 5 | Total | Report |
|---|---|---|---|---|---|---|---|---|---|---|---|
| 20 Jun | 20:00 | Croatia | 1–3 | Bulgaria | 25–22 | 22–25 | 17–25 | 20–25 | | 84–97 | Report |

== Final standing ==
| Rank | Team |
|---|---|
| 1st place, gold medalist(s) | Bulgaria |
| 2nd place, silver medalist(s) | Croatia |
| 3rd place, bronze medalist(s) | Spain |
| 4 | Czech Republic |
| 5 | France |
| 6 | Slovakia |
| 7 | Romania |
| 8 | Belarus |
| 9 | Hungary |
| 10 | Ukraine |
| 11 | Azerbaijan |
| 12 | Bosnia and Herzegovina |
| 13 | Austria |
| 14 | Slovenia |
| 15 | Portugal |
| 16 | Estonia |
| 17 | Israel |
| 18 | Latvia |
| 19 | Luxembourg |

2021 European League champions

Bulgaria
2nd title

== Awards ==
- Most Valuable Player
  (Bulgaria) Zhana Todorova

== See also ==
- 2021 Men's European Volleyball League
