= Kamil Rychlicki =

Luxembourgish volleyball player (born 1996)

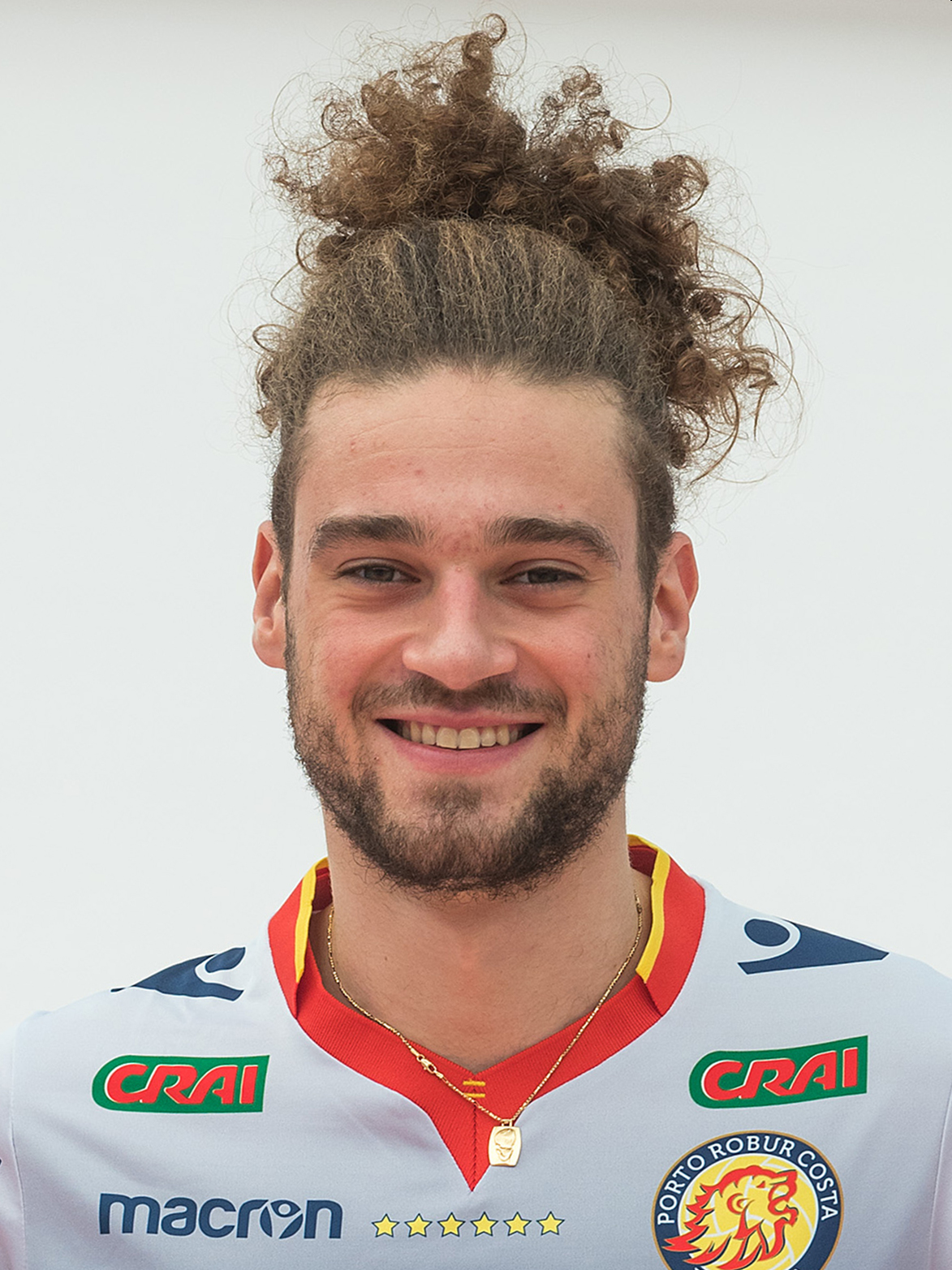
- Rychlicki in 2019

Personal information
- Nationality: Luxembourgish, Italian
- Born: 1 November 1996 (age 30) Ettelbruck, Luxembourg
- Height: 2.04 m (6 ft 8 in)
- Weight: 88 kg (194 lb)
- Spike: 341 cm (134 in)
- Block: 335 cm (132 in)

Volleyball information
- Position: Opposite
- Current club: Warta Zawiercie
- Number: 11

Career
- Years: Team
- 2012–2016 2016–2018 2018–2019 2019–2021 2021–2023 2023–2025 2025–2026 2026–: VC Strassen; Noliko Maaseik; Consar Ravenna; Cucine Lube Civitanova; Sir Safety Perugia; Trentino Volley; ZAKSA Kędzierzyn-Koźle; Warta Zawiercie

National team
- Years: Team
- 2013–2019 2025–: Luxembourg; Italy
Honours
Men's volleyball
Representing Italy
FIVB World Championship
Gold medal – first place	2025 Philippines

Kamil Rychlicki (born 1 November 1996) is a professional volleyball player of Polish descent who plays as an opposite spiker for Warta Zawiercie. Born in Luxembourg, Rychlicki has represented Italy on the international stage since 2025.

== Personal life ==
Both his parents played volleyball with father Jacek being a silver medallist at the 1983 European Championship with his national team.

== Honours ==
=== Club ===
Luxembourg Cup:

- 2013, 2014, 2015, 2016

Luxembourg Championship:

- 2014, 2015, 2016
- 2013

Belgian SuperCup:

- 2016

Belgium Championship:

- 2016
- 2018
- 2017

Italian SuperCup:

- 2022

==== FIVB Club World Championship ====
- Brazil 2019 – with Cucine Lube Civitanova
- Brazil 2022 – with Sir Safety Susa Perugia

=== National team ===
European Championship of the Small Countries Juniors:

- 2012

European Championship of the Small Countries:

- 2015, 2017
- 2013
