= Monaco women's national volleyball team =

Women's national volleyball team representing Monaco

Monaco
- Association: Monaco Volleyball Federation
- Confederation: CEV
- FIVB ranking: NR (29 June 2025)

Uniforms
Home	Away

The Monaco women's national volleyball team ( French : Équipe de Monaco de volley-ball féminin ) represents Monaco in international women's volleyball competitions and friendly matches, The Team Ruled and managed by the Monaco Volleyball Federation that is a part of the Federation of International Volleyball (FIVB) as well as the European Volleyball Confederation (CEV), The Monaco Team also follow the Small Countries Association (SCA).

== History ==
The Monaco Volleyball Federation was founded in 1987, and since 1988, it has been a member of the FIVB and the CEV. In May 1993, the Monaco women's volleyball team made its international debut by participating in the European Small States Games held in Malta. At the group stage of the tournament they won only one game (over the national team of Malta) and suffered two defeats from the teams of Cyprus and Iceland, dropping out of the fight for medals of the Games. For over 30 years Monaco has not participated in official international competitions. Monaco is one of the three member countries of the European Volleyball Confederation, where the national championship is not held (besides Andorra and Liechtenstein), and the strongest team of the country (Monaco VB) plays in the French 2nd Division Championship.
