= Andorra women's national volleyball team =

Women's national volleyball team representing Andorra

Andorra
- Association: Andorra Volleyball Federation
- Confederation: CEV
- FIVB ranking: NR (29 June 2025)

Uniforms
Home	Away

The Andorra women's national volleyball team ( Catalan : Selecció femenina de voleibol d'Andorra ) represents Andorra in international women's volleyball competitions and friendly matches, The team ruled and managed by the Andorra Volleyball Federation ( Catalan : Federació Andorrana de Voleibol ) that is a part of the Federation of International Volleyball (FIVB) as well as the European Volleyball Confederation (CEV), The Andorra Team also follow the Small Countries Association (SCA).

== Team history ==
The Andorran Volleyball Federation has been a member of the FIVB and the CEV since 1987. The only official tournament in which the Andorran women's volleyball team participated was the Second European Small States Games held in May 1989 in Cyprus. Four national teams have participated in this tournament, the Andorran team lost all three of their matches to the national teams of Cyprus, Luxembourg and San Marino and closed the final table of the competition in last place. The Andorran national team since has not been formed again for over 30 years and have to wait until 2021 when the team again resume its activities. Andorra is one of the three member countries of the European Volleyball Confederation, where the national championship is not held (besides Monaco and Liechtenstein), and the only Andorran team ("Vall D'Andorra") plays in the championship of Catalonia.
