= San Marino Volleyball Federation =

Volleyball governing body in San Marino

- Federazione Sammarinese Pallavolo
- Formation: 1980
- Headquarters: San Marino
- Location: San Marino
- President: Gianluigi Lazzarini

San Marino Volleyball Federation or FSPAV (Italian: Federazione Sammarinese Pallavolo) is the governing body of volleyball and beach volleyball in San Marino. It was formed in 1980.

It organizes the internal league and runs the San Marino national volleyball team.

The President of the federation is Gianluigi Lazzarini.

== See also ==
- San Marino men's national volleyball team
- San Marino women's national volleyball team
- Banca di San Marino Serie C femminile
