= European Volleyball Championship of the Small Countries Division =

Biannual sports competition

The European Volleyball Championship of the Small Countries Association is a biannual sports competition for men's, women's and junior national teams. It is recognized and fully supported by the European Volleyball Confederation (CEV) and organized by one of its zonal associations called the CEV Small Countries Association (CEV SCA) (Small state), formerly the Small Countries Division (SCD). Only national federations of the 13 countries which are members of the CEV SCA are eligible to participate in the tournaments.

== CEV SCA members ==
Country	CEV Code
Andorra	AND
Faroe Islands	FAR
Gibraltar	GIB
Greenland	GRL
Iceland	ISL

Country	CEV Code
Ireland	IRL
Liechtenstein	LIE
Malta	MLT
Monaco	MON
Northern Ireland	NIR

Country	CEV Code
San Marino	SMR
Scotland	SCO
Wales	WAL

== Men ==
Year	Host	Gold	Silver	Bronze	Ref.
2000	Malta (MLT)	Cyprus	Scotland	Luxembourg	
2002	Andorra (AND)	Cyprus	Iceland	Scotland	
2004	Luxembourg (LUX)	Cyprus	Luxembourg	Faroe Islands	
2007	Limassol (CYP)	Cyprus	Andorra	Luxembourg	
2009	Luxembourg (LUX)	Cyprus	Luxembourg	Iceland	
2011	Andorra (AND)	Cyprus	Luxembourg	Andorra	
2013	Limassol (CYP)	Cyprus	Scotland	Luxembourg	
2015	Luxembourg (LUX)	Luxembourg	Cyprus	Scotland	
2017	Reykjavík (ISL)	Luxembourg	Cyprus	Iceland	
2019	Tórshavn (FAR)	Scotland	Faroe Islands	Iceland	
2021 (Note: Held in May 2022 because of the COVID-19 pandemic in Europe.)	Tórshavn (FAR)	San Marino	Faroe Islands	Scotland	
2023	Edinburgh (SCO)	Luxembourg	Scotland	Iceland	
2024	Vaduz (LIE)	San Marino	Northern Ireland	Scotland	
2025	Serravalle (SMR)	San Marino	Scotland	Northern Ireland	
2026	Craigavon (NIR)	Faroe Islands	San Marino	Scotland	

=== Medals summary ===
Rank	Nation	Gold	Silver	Bronze	Total
1	Cyprus	7	2	0	9
2	Luxembourg	3	3	3	9
3	San Marino	3	1	0	4
4	Scotland	1	4	5	10
5	Faroe Islands	1	2	1	4
6	Iceland	0	1	4	5
7	Andorra	0	1	1	2
7	Northern Ireland	0	1	1	2
Totals (8 entries)		15	15	15	45

== Women ==
Year	Host	Gold	Silver	Bronze	Ref.
2000	Malta (MLT)	Cyprus	San Marino	Malta	
2002	Luxembourg (LUX)	San Marino	Cyprus	Luxembourg	
2004	Schaan (LIE)	Cyprus	Luxembourg	Liechtenstein	
2007	Glasgow (SCO)	Iceland	Luxembourg	Cyprus	
2009	Schaan (LIE)	Cyprus	San Marino	Luxembourg	
2011	Luxembourg (LUX)	Cyprus	San Marino	Luxembourg	
2013	Cospicua (MLT)	Cyprus	San Marino	Scotland	
2015	Schaan (LIE)	Cyprus	Scotland	Luxembourg	
2017	Luxembourg (LUX)	Iceland	Luxembourg	Cyprus	
2019	Luxembourg (LUX)	Luxembourg	Scotland	Faroe Islands	
2021 (Note: Held in May 2022 because of the COVID-19 pandemic in Europe.)	Reykjavík (ISL)	Scotland	Iceland	Faroe Islands	
2023	Luxembourg (LUX)	Iceland	Scotland	Luxembourg	
2024	Serravalle (SMR)	Scotland	San Marino	Ireland	
2025	Dublin (IRL)	Scotland	San Marino	Ireland	
2026	Andorra la Vella (AND)	Scotland	San Marino	Faroe Islands	

=== Medals summary ===
Rank	Nation	Gold	Silver	Bronze	Total
1	Cyprus	6	1	2	9
2	Scotland	4	3	1	8
3	Iceland	3	1	0	4
4	San Marino	1	7	0	8
5	Luxembourg	1	3	5	9
6	Faroe Islands	0	0	3	3
7	Ireland	0	0	2	2
8	Liechtenstein	0	0	1	1
8	Malta	0	0	1	1
Totals (9 entries)		15	15	15	45

== Junior men ==
Year	Host	Gold	Silver	Bronze	Ref.
2006	Schaan (LIE)	Cyprus	Luxembourg	San Marino	
2008	Cospicua (MLT)	Luxembourg	Cyprus	San Marino	
2012	Motherwell (SCO)	Cyprus	Luxembourg	Scotland	
2014	Luxembourg (LUX)	Scotland	Luxembourg	Northern Ireland	
2016	Nicosia (CYP)	Cyprus	Luxembourg	Scotland	
2018	Tórshavn (FAR)	Luxembourg	Faroe Islands	Iceland	
2020	Not held because of the COVID-19 pandemic in Europe				
2022	Dublin (IRL)	Luxembourg	Andorra	Northern Ireland	
2023	Andorra la Vella (AND)	Andorra	Luxembourg	Northern Ireland	
2024	Dublin (IRL)	Scotland	San Marino	Ireland	
2026	Dublin (IRL)	Iceland	Ireland	Faroe Islands	

=== Medals summary ===
Rank	Nation	Gold	Silver	Bronze	Total
1	Luxembourg	3	5	0	8
2	Cyprus	3	1	0	4
3	Scotland	2	0	2	4
4	Andorra	1	1	0	2
5	Iceland	1	0	1	2
6	San Marino	0	1	2	3
7	Faroe Islands	0	1	1	2
7	Ireland	0	1	1	2
9	Northern Ireland	0	0	3	3
Totals (9 entries)		10	10	10	30

== Junior women ==
Year	Host	Gold	Silver	Bronze	Ref.
2006	Serravalle (SMR)	Luxembourg	Cyprus	San Marino	
2008	Schaan (LIE)	Luxembourg	Cyprus	Liechtenstein	
2010	Luxembourg (LUX)	Luxembourg	Cyprus	Liechtenstein	
2012	Limassol (CYP)	Cyprus	Scotland	Luxembourg	
2014	Serravalle (SMR)	Luxembourg	San Marino	Scotland	
2016	Edinburgh (SCO)	Cyprus	Luxembourg	Scotland	
2018	Schaan (LIE)	Luxembourg	Faroe Islands	Scotland	
2020 (Note: Held in September 2021 because of the COVID-19 pandemic in Europe.)	Laugarvatn (ISL)	Iceland	Faroe Islands	Malta	
2022	Luxembourg (LUX)	Luxembourg	Ireland	Northern Ireland	
2023	Cospicua (MLT)	Luxembourg	San Marino	Malta	
2024	Cospicua (MLT)	Malta	Scotland	Ireland	
2025	Cospicua (MLT)	San Marino	Malta	Northern Ireland	
2026	San Marino (SMR)				

=== Medals summary ===
Rank	Nation	Gold	Silver	Bronze	Total
1	Luxembourg	7	1	1	9
2	Cyprus	2	3	0	5
3	San Marino	1	2	1	4
4	Malta	1	1	2	4
5	Iceland	1	0	0	1
6	Scotland	0	2	3	5
7	Faroe Islands	0	2	0	2
8	Ireland	0	1	1	2
9	Liechtenstein	0	0	2	2
9	Northern Ireland	0	0	2	2
Totals (10 entries)		12	12	12	36
