= San Marino women's national volleyball team =

Women's national volleyball team representing San Marino

San Marino
- Association: FSPAV
- Confederation: CEV
- FIVB ranking: 52 ▲1 (2 October 2026)

Uniforms
| Home | Away |

The San Marino women's national volleyball team ( Italian : Nazionale di pallavolo femminile di San Marino ) represents San Marino in international women's volleyball competitions and friendly matches, The Team Ruled and managed by the San Marino Volleyball Federation ( Italian : Federazione Sammarinese Pallavolo : FSPAV ) that is a part of the Federation of International Volleyball (FIVB) as well as the European Volleyball Confederation (CEV), The San Marino Team also follow the Small Countries Association (SCA).

== Team history ==
The San Marino Volleyball Federation was founded in 1980 and joined the FIVB and the CEV in 1987. Under an agreement with the Italian Volleyball Federation, San Marino's Elite team, plays in the Italian Championship (currently in Serie D, the sixth tiers of the Italian Divisions). The San marino national team which is one of the smallest European countries, played its first official matches in May 1989 in Cyprus, taking part in the volleyball tournament of the Games of Small States of Europe. The San Marino team became silver medalist of the competition, defeating Luxembourg and Andorra and losing only to the host country, the national team of Cyprus. the following years the women's national volleyball team of San Marino has always been a participant of this tournament, having won it four times, meanwhile they won the Small Nations Championship Twice. San marino has never participated in any FIVB World Championship they only play a word qualification tournament in 2014 and they failed to qualify.
