= Portugal women's national volleyball team =

National sports team

Portugal
- Association: Portuguese Volleyball Federation (FPV)
- Confederation: CEV
- FIVB ranking: 40 ▲1 (24 May 2026)

Uniforms
Home
- www.fpvoleibol.pt (in Portuguese)

The Portugal women's national volleyball team is controlled by the Portuguese Volleyball Federation and represents Portugal in international women's volleyball competitions and friendly matches.

The team has played in many qualification tournaments but is yet to qualify for a major tournament. In 2017, it played the European League for the first time.

== Results ==
=== European Volleyball League ===
Champions Runners-up Third place Fourth place

European League record
Year	Round	Position	Pld	W	L	SW	SL	Squad
2009	did not participate							
2010	did not participate							
2011	did not participate							
2012	did not participate							
2013	did not participate							
2014	did not participate							
2015	did not participate							
2016	did not participate							
2017	Group stage	7th	6	2	4	8	13	Squad
2018	Group stage	12th	6	0	6	3	18	
2019	Group stage	19th	6	1	5	9	17	
2021	Semi-Finals (Silver League)	15th	8	5	3	18	13	
2022	Final (Silver League)	11th	9	6	3	21	14	
2023	Semi-Finals (Silver League)	12th	8	6	2	19	8	
2024	Final (Silver League)	13th	7	5	2	16	7	
2025	League Round	10th	6	2	4	9	14	
2026	League Round	15th	6	2	4	9	12	
Total	0 titles	9/17	62	29	33	112	116	—
