= Liechtenstein women's national volleyball team =

Women's national volleyball team representing Liechtenstein

Liechtenstein
- Association: Liechtenstein Volleyball Federation
- Confederation: CEV
- FIVB ranking: NR (29 June 2025)

Uniforms
Home	Away

The Liechtenstein women's national volleyball team ( German : Liechtensteinische Volleyballnationalmannschaft der Frauen ) represents Liechtenstein in international women's volleyball competitions and friendly matches, The Team Ruled and managed by the Liechtenstein Volleyball Federation that is a part of the Federation of International Volleyball (FIVB) as well as the European Volleyball Confederation (CEV), The Liechtenstein Team also follow the Small Countries Association (SCA).

== Team history ==
The Liechtenstein Volleyball Union has been a member of the FIVB and the CEV since 1978. The Liechtenstein women's national team first entered the official international competitions in 1991, taking part in the volleyball tournament of the European Small States Games held in Andorra. The result of the debutants was the 4th place among 5 teams. Since then, the Liechtenstein volleyball players have participated in most of these tournaments (except for 2013). Since 1994, the Liechtenstein national team has been a regular participant in the European Championships in the small nations division and has won the bronze medal only once in 2004.

In 2013, the Liechtenstein national team tried its hand for the first time in an official tournament of a higher rank, having entered the qualifying tournament of the World Championship, but quite expectedly could not oppose its rivals in the group Slovakia, Greece and Austria, losing to them all with the same score of 0:3 and failing to score more than 14 points in a set. Characterizing modern women's volleyball in the country, which is one of the smallest in Europe, Liechtenstein is one of the three member countries of the European Volleyball Confederation, where the national championship is not held (besides Monaco and Andorra), and Liechtenstein teams (6 in total, representing 2 clubs) play in different divisions of the Swiss championship.
