= Malta women's national volleyball team =

Women's national volleyball team representing Malta

Malta
- Association: Maltese Volleyball Association
- Confederation: CEV
- FIVB ranking: NR (29 June 2025)

Uniforms
Home	Away

The Malta women's national volleyball team (Maltese: Tim nazzjonali volleyball tan-nisa ta 'Malta) represents Malta in international women's volleyball competitions and friendly matches. The team is run and managed by the Maltese Volleyball Association, which is a part of the Federation of International Volleyball (FIVB) as well as the European Volleyball Confederation (CEV). The Maltese team also follows regional European volleyball body - the Small Countries Association (SCA).

== Team history ==
The Maltese women's national volleyball team has not managed to qualify for any major international volleyball events throughout its history, like the FIVB Volleyball Women's World Championship, Olympic Games, or European Championship. They often participate in regional competitions such as the Small Countries Division Championship.
