= Cyprus women's national volleyball team =

National sports team

Cyprus
- Association: Cyprus Volleyball Federation
- Confederation: CEV
- FIVB ranking: NR (29 June 2025)

Uniforms
Home

European Championship (Small Countries Division)
- Appearances: 8 (First in 2001)
- Best result: Champions (2001, 2005, 2009, 2011, 2013, 2015)

The Cyprus women's national volleyball team represents Cyprus in international women's volleyball competitions and friendly matches.

The team won the gold medal at the 2013 edition of the Games of the Small States of Europe in Luxembourg.

The team competes in the European Volleyball Championship of the Small Countries Division.
