= Iceland women's national volleyball team =

Women's national volleyball team representing Iceland

Iceland
- Association: BLÍ
- Confederation: CEV
- Head coach: Daniele Mario Capriotti
- FIVB ranking: 69 ▲10 (29 June 2025)

Uniforms
Home	Away

The Iceland women's national volleyball team represents Iceland in international women's volleyball competitions and friendly matches.
