= Luxembourg women's national volleyball team =

Women's national volleyball team representing Luxembourg

Luxembourg
- Association: Luxembourg Volleyball Federation
- Confederation: CEV
- FIVB ranking: 71 ▲10 (29 June 2025)

Uniforms
Home	Away

The Luxembourg women's national volleyball team ( Luxembourgish : Lëtzebuergesch Volleyballnationalequipe der Frauen, French : Équipe du Luxembourg de volley-ball féminin, German : Luxemburgische Volleyballnationalmannschaft der Frauen ) represents Luxembourg in international women's volleyball competitions and friendly matches, The Team Ruled and managed by the Luxembourg Volleyball Federation that is a part of the Federation of International Volleyball (FIVB) as well as the European Volleyball Confederation (CEV), The Luxembourg Team also follow the Small Countries Association (SCA).

== History ==
The Luxembourg Volleyball Federation has been a member of the FIVB since 1951. The Luxembourg women's national team entered the international competitions in 1956, when the country's volleyball players took part in the FIVB World Championship, which was held in Paris. In 8 matches the Luxembourg team won only one game and eventually took the last 17th place, after which they did not participate in official tournaments for 33 years. Since 1989, the Luxembourg women's volleyball team has been a participant of the European Small Nations Championships and the Continental Europe Small Nations Games. Three times Luxembourg volleyball team won these competitions, they won the first for 2 occasions and the second for once. 5 times the national team of the (Grand Duchy) was among the participants of the qualifying tournaments of the European Championships, but in 17 matches played overall they could not take even a single set. Interestingly, in 2007 Luxembourg was one of the countries (along with Belgium) that hosted the European continental championship, but its team was not directly admitted to the tournament, cause of the low level of the national team.
