= 2026 Women's European Volleyball League preliminary round =

Women's volleyball tournament

Tournament details
- Dates: 29–31 May
- Teams: 4 (from 1 confederation)
- Venue: 1 (in 1 host city)

The preliminary round of the 2026 Women's European Volleyball League took place from the 29 to 31 May to decide the two teams advancing to the league phase of the tournament. The preliminary round took place in Odense, Denmark between the four lowest ranked teams who entered.

== Pool composition ==
Group
(Denmark) Odense

Denmark
Luxembourg
Albania
Lithuania

== Group ==
- All times are local.
- Venue: Arena Fyn, Odense, Denmark

Pos	Team	Pld	W	L	Pts	SW	SL	SR	SPW	SPL	SPR	Qualification
1	Lithuania	3	2	1	7	8	3	2.667	244	217	1.124	League round
2	Albania	3	2	1	6	8	6	1.333	297	267	1.112	League round
3	Denmark (H)	3	1	2	3	5	8	0.625	269	279	0.964	
4	Luxembourg	3	1	2	2	4	8	0.500	228	275	0.829	

Source: CEV
(H) Host

=== Matches ===
29 May 2026; 16:00	Albania	3–1	Luxembourg	Arena Fyn, Odense; Attendance: 40; Referees: Morten Engborg Klein , Süleyman Yalcin
29 May 2026; 16:00	(21–25, 25–17, 25–15, 25–14); Report			Arena Fyn, Odense; Attendance: 40; Referees: Morten Engborg Klein , Süleyman Yalcin
29 May 2026; 16:00	Scoring leaders			Arena Fyn, Odense; Attendance: 40; Referees: Morten Engborg Klein , Süleyman Yalcin
Bici 33		Total	Van Elslande 16
Bici (30/60)		Attack	Van Elslande (13/41)
Gjata 4		Block	Snopok 2
Bici (3/18)		Serve	Teso (3/21)

29 May 2026; 19:00	Lithuania	3–0	Denmark	Arena Fyn, Odense; Attendance: 150; Referees: Bozhidara Mitkova , Juraj Mokry
29 May 2026; 19:00	(26–24, 25–22, 25–16); Report			Arena Fyn, Odense; Attendance: 150; Referees: Bozhidara Mitkova , Juraj Mokry
29 May 2026; 19:00	Scoring leaders			Arena Fyn, Odense; Attendance: 150; Referees: Bozhidara Mitkova , Juraj Mokry
Šalkutė 13		Total	Mogensen 16
Šalkutė (12/39)		Attack	Mogensen (14/41)
Staniulytė 6		Block	Nielsen 4
Pravdinskaite (1/10)		Serve	Nielsen (1/11)

30 May 2026; 15:00	Luxembourg	0–3	Lithuania	Arena Fyn, Odense; Attendance: 45; Referees: Juraj Mokry , Morten Engborg Klein
30 May 2026; 15:00	(22–25, 18–25, 13–25); Report			Arena Fyn, Odense; Attendance: 45; Referees: Juraj Mokry , Morten Engborg Klein
30 May 2026; 15:00	Scoring leaders			Arena Fyn, Odense; Attendance: 45; Referees: Juraj Mokry , Morten Engborg Klein
Van Elslande 10		Total	Paukštytė 13
Van Elslande (8/35)		Attack	Paukštytė (12/29)
Tarantini 2		Block	Rakauskaitė 4
Teso (3/10)		Serve	Paukštytė (1/13)

30 May 2026; 18:00	Denmark	3–2	Albania	Arena Fyn, Odense; Attendance: 140; Referees: Süleyman Yalcin , Bozhidara Mitkova
30 May 2026; 18:00	(25–22, 25–17, 17–25, 21–25, 15–10); Report			Arena Fyn, Odense; Attendance: 140; Referees: Süleyman Yalcin , Bozhidara Mitkova
30 May 2026; 18:00	Scoring leaders			Arena Fyn, Odense; Attendance: 140; Referees: Süleyman Yalcin , Bozhidara Mitkova
Bassøe 20		Total	Bici 38
Bassøe (15/34)		Attack	Bici (30/78)
Brinck 7		Block	Malaj 4
Lachenmeier (3/17)		Serve	Bici (5/21)

31 May 2026; 15:00	Albania	3–2	Lithuania	Arena Fyn, Odense; Attendance: 50; Referees: Süleyman Yalcin , Juraj Mokry
31 May 2026; 15:00	(25–9, 14–25, 23–25, 25–22, 15–12); Report			Arena Fyn, Odense; Attendance: 50; Referees: Süleyman Yalcin , Juraj Mokry
31 May 2026; 15:00	Scoring leaders			Arena Fyn, Odense; Attendance: 50; Referees: Süleyman Yalcin , Juraj Mokry
Bici 32		Total	Paukštytė 20
Bici (29/73)		Attack	Paukstyte (15/43)
Gjata 8		Block	Rakauskaitė, Staniulytė 2
Gjata (5/22)		Serve	Paukštytė (4/21)

31 May 2026; 18:00	Luxembourg	3–2	Denmark	Arena Fyn, Odense; Attendance: 170; Referees: Bozhidara Mitkova , Morten Engborg Klein
31 May 2026; 18:00	(21–25, 25–18, 25–23, 18–25, 15–13); Report			Arena Fyn, Odense; Attendance: 170; Referees: Bozhidara Mitkova , Morten Engborg Klein
31 May 2026; 18:00	Scoring leaders			Arena Fyn, Odense; Attendance: 170; Referees: Bozhidara Mitkova , Morten Engborg Klein
Van Elslande 28		Total	Mogensen 26
Van Elslande (23/53)		Attack	Mogensen (22/54)
Van Elslande 3		Block	Nielsen 3
Feller (4/17)		Serve	Krogh (4/16)

== See also ==
- 2026 Women's European Volleyball Championship
- 2026 AVC Women's Volleyball Cup
