= Norway women's national under-19 volleyball team =

Norway U18
- Association: Norwegian Volleyball Federation
- Confederation: CEV

Uniforms
Home	Away	Third

FIVB U19 World Championship
- Appearances: No Appearances

NEVZA U17 Championship
- Appearances: 10 (First in 2010)
- Best result: (gold) Champions : (2013)

The Norway women's national under-18 volleyball team represents Norway in international women's volleyball competitions and friendly matches under the age 18 and it is ruled and managed by the Norwegian Volleyball Federation That is an affiliate of Federation of International Volleyball FIVB and also a part of European Volleyball Confederation CEV.

== Results ==
=== Summer Youth Olympics ===
Champions Runners up Third place Fourth place

Youth Olympic Games
Year	Round	Position	Pld	W	L	SW	SL	Squad
(Singapore) 2010	Didn't qualify							
(China) 2014	No Volleyball Event							
(Argentina) 2018	No Volleyball Event							
Total	0 Titles	0/1						

=== FIVB U18 World Championship ===
Champions Runners up Third place Fourth place

FIVB U18 World Championship
Year	Round	Position	Pld	W	L	SW	SL	Squad
1989 To 2021	Didn't qualify							
Total	0 Titles	0/17						

=== Europe U18 / U17 Championship ===
Champions Runners up Third place Fourth place

Europe U18 / U17 Championship
Year	Round	Position	Pld	W	L	SW	SL	Squad
(Spain) 1995	Didn't qualify							
(Slovakia) 1997	Didn't qualify							
(Poland) 1999	Didn't qualify							
(Czech Republic) 2001	Didn't qualify							
(Croatia) 2003	Didn't qualify							
(Estonia) 2005	Didn't qualify							
(Czech Republic) 2007	Didn't qualify							
(Netherlands) 2009	Didn't qualify							
(Turkey) 2011	Didn't qualify							
2013 Q	Group Stages	5th Place						
2015 Q	Group Stages	4th Place						
2017 Q	Group Stages	4th Place						
2018 Q	Didn't enter							
2020 Q	Group Stages	4th Place						
2022 Q	Second Round	4th Place						
Total	0 Titles	0/14						

== Results ==
=== Previous matches 2022 ===
Date	Time		Score		Set 1	Set 2	Set 3	Set 4	Set 5	Total	Report
17 Dec	15:00	Iceland	0–3	Norway	17–25	14–25	12–25			43–75	Report
17 Dec	20:00	Norway	3–0	Faroe Islands	25–13	25–14	25–14			75–41	Report
18 Dec	12:00	Norway	0–3	Finland	21–25	17–25	19–25			57–75	Report
19 Dec	10:00	Denmark	0–3	Norway	22–25	11–25	20–25			53–75	Report
19 Dec	17:00	Finland	3–0	Norway	25–22	25–18	26–24			76–64	Report

== Team ==
=== Previous squad ===
The Following Players Represents Norway in the 2022 Girls' U17 Volleyball European Championship Qualification

#	Name	Position	Height	Weight	Birthday	Spike	Block
1	HØIBY Sofia Halsne	Setter	168	50	2006	265	220
2	SUNDE Solveig	Setter	169	50	2006	280	220
3	FOSSELI Tale Adine	Outside spiker	171	50	2006	270	220
4	LOCKERT Mathilde Lassesen	Outside spiker	177	50	2006	280	220
5	AKSNES-ØYSTESE Lilli Tuften	Libero	160	50	2007	260	220
6	TVEIT Bertine Skipevåg	Outside spiker	169	50	2006	280	220
7	JÜRGENSEN Lucy Lotta	Opposite	179	50	2006	290	220
8	MOL Sofia Melina	Outside spiker	175	50	2006	288	220
9	REDSE-ARSET Runa	Setter	186	50	2006	280	220
10	HODNE Selma Tryggestad	Middle blocker	188	50	2006	299	220
11	NYGAARD Ella Linnea	Middle blocker	184	50	2006	298	220
12	VASSDAL Selma	Middle blocker	184	50	2006	289	220
13	LASSESEN Emma	Libero	164	50	2006	250	220
14	AASGARD Siri	Outside spiker	175	50	2006	260	220
15	VAIGAFA Zara	Outside spiker	174	50	2007	250	220
16	FØRDE Ella Hoem	Outside spiker	168	50	2006	250	220
17	KAAFJORD Ella Othilie Hübert	Middle blocker	173	50	2006	250	220
18	ASKELAND Erle	Setter	165	50	2006	250	220
19	FJERSTAD Hanna Østborg	Middle blocker	173	50	2006	250	220
20	VÅGE Henriette Næss	Opposite	167	50	2006	250	220
21	BRATTLI Kirsti Eide	Libero	1620	50	2007	250	220
22	RØNNEVIK Thea Tennøy	Outside spiker	175	50	2006	255	225
23	VIEM Magdalena Holden	Setter	171	50	2006	253	222
24	DHAUG Embla Berg	Middle blocker	181	60	2006	291	240
