= 2016 Women's U19 Volleyball European Championship Qualification =

This is an article about qualification for the 2016 Women's U19 Volleyball European Championship.

== Qualification summary ==
- Belarus
- Belgium
- Bulgaria
- Croatia
- France
- Germany
- Hungary
- Italy
- Russia
- Serbia
- Slovakia
- Turkey

== Pool standing procedure ==
1. Number of matches won
2. Match points
3. Sets ratio
4. Points ratio
5. Result of the last match between the tied teams

Match won 3–0 or 3–1: 3 match points for the winner, 0 match points for the loser
Match won 3–2: 2 match points for the winner, 1 match point for the loser

== Direct qualification ==
Host countries, Slovakia and Hungary, qualified for final round directly.

== First round ==
First round was held 7–10 January 2016. 6 teams competed in 2 first round tournaments consisting of 3 teams. The winners of each pools qualified for the second round.

- Pools composition

Pool 1	Pool 2
Israel	Belarus
Ukraine	England
Kosovo	Georgia

All times are local.

=== Pool 1 ===
- Venue: Palace of Youth and Sports, Pristina, Kosovo

Pos	Team	Pld	W	L	Pts	SW	SL	SR	SPW	SPL	SPR	Qualification
1	Ukraine	2	2	0	6	6	0	MAX	150	99	1.515	Second round
2	Kosovo	2	1	1	3	3	3	1.000	120	137	0.876	
3	Israel	2	0	2	0	0	6	0.000	116	150	0.773	

Date	Time		Score		Set 1	Set 2	Set 3	Set 4	Set 5	Total	Report
7 Jan	17:00	Kosovo	3–0	Israel	25–22	25–22	25–18			75–62	Report
8 Jan	17:00	Israel	0–3	Ukraine	21–25	10–25	23–25			54–75	Report
9 Jan	17:00	Ukraine	3–0	Kosovo	25–15	25–19	25–11			75–45	Report

=== Pool 2 ===
- Venue: (Georgia (country)) New Volleyball Arena, Tbilisi, Georgia

Pos	Team	Pld	W	L	Pts	SW	SL	SR	SPW	SPL	SPR	Qualification
1	Belarus	2	2	0	6	6	1	6.000	169	112	1.509	Second round
2	Georgia	2	1	1	3	4	3	1.333	145	134	1.082	
3	England	2	0	2	0	0	6	0.000	81	150	0.540	

Date	Time		Score		Set 1	Set 2	Set 3	Set 4	Set 5	Total	Report
8 Jan	17:00	Georgia	3–0	England	25–16	25–13	25–10			75–39	Report
9 Jan	17:00	England	0–3	Belarus	15–25	15–25	12–25			42–75	Report
10 Jan	17:00	Belarus	3–1	Georgia	25–16	25–14	19–25	25–15		94–70	Report

== Second round ==
Second round was held 31 March – 3 April 2016. 28 teams competed in 7 pools of 4 teams. The winners of each pools qualified for final round. The 2nd placed teams of each pool and the best 3rd placed team qualified for the third round.

- Pools composition

Pool A	Pool B	Pool C	Pool D	Pool E	Pool F	Pool G
Serbia	Turkey	Italy	Russia	Bulgaria	Slovenia	Czech Republic
Greece	Croatia	Germany	Poland	Finland	France	Belgium
Romania	Spain	Netherlands	Switzerland	Estonia	Latvia	Austria
Belarus	Sweden	Portugal	Ukraine	Norway	Azerbaijan	Denmark

All times are local.

=== Pool A ===
- Venue: Sportska Hala Vlade Divac, Vrnjačka Banja, Serbia

Pos	Team	Pld	W	L	Pts	SW	SL	SR	SPW	SPL	SPR	Qualification
1	Belarus	3	3	0	9	9	2	4.500	268	208	1.288	2016 European Championship
2	Serbia	3	1	2	3	4	6	0.667	226	236	0.958	Third round
3	Greece	3	1	2	3	4	6	0.667	203	239	0.849	
4	Romania	3	1	2	3	3	6	0.500	195	209	0.933	

Date	Time		Score		Set 1	Set 2	Set 3	Set 4	Set 5	Total	Report
31 Mar	15:00	Romania	3–0	Greece	25–23	25–14	25–20			75–57	Report
31 Mar	17:30	Serbia	1–3	Belarus	25–20	16–25	20–25	22–25		83–95	Report
1 Apr	15:00	Greece	1–3	Belarus	25–23	16–25	18–25	12–25		71–98	Report
1 Apr	17:30	Romania	0–3	Serbia	25–27	23–25	18–25			66–77	Report
2 Apr	15:00	Belarus	3–0	Romania	25–17	25–20	25–17			75–54	Report
3 Apr	20:00	Greece	3–0	Serbia	25–22	25–23	25–21			75–66	Report

=== Pool B ===
- Venue: Dvorana Gimnasium, Rovinj, Croatia

Pos	Team	Pld	W	L	Pts	SW	SL	SR	SPW	SPL	SPR	Qualification
1	Turkey	3	3	0	9	9	0	MAX	225	126	1.786	2016 European Championship
2	Croatia	3	2	1	5	6	5	1.200	239	234	1.021	Third round
3	Spain	3	1	2	4	5	7	0.714	242	257	0.942	
4	Sweden	3	0	3	0	1	9	0.111	159	248	0.641	

Date	Time		Score		Set 1	Set 2	Set 3	Set 4	Set 5	Total	Report
31 Mar	17:30	Sweden	0–3	Croatia	15–25	16–25	17–25			48–75	Report
1 Apr	15:00	Turkey	3–0	Spain	25–12	25–11	25–10			75–33	Report
2 Apr	17:30	Croatia	3–2	Spain	30–28	19–25	20–25	25–22	15–11	109–111	Report
2 Apr	20:00	Sweden	0–3	Turkey	13–25	11–25	14–25			38–75	Report
3 Apr	15:00	Spain	3–1	Sweden	25–20	25–11	23–25	25–17		98–73	Report
3 Apr	17:30	Croatia	0–3	Turkey	14–25	19–25	22–25			55–75	Report

=== Pool C ===
- Venue: Pala Dennerlein, Naples, Italy

Pos	Team	Pld	W	L	Pts	SW	SL	SR	SPW	SPL	SPR	Qualification
1	Italy	3	3	0	9	9	1	9.000	249	204	1.221	2016 European Championship
2	Germany	3	2	1	6	7	3	2.333	250	199	1.256	Third round
3	Netherlands	3	1	2	2	3	8	0.375	231	252	0.917	
4	Portugal	3	0	3	1	2	9	0.222	188	263	0.715	

Date	Time		Score		Set 1	Set 2	Set 3	Set 4	Set 5	Total	Report
1 Apr	16:00	Portugal	0–3	Germany	10–25	16–25	14–25			40–75	Report
1 Apr	18:30	Italy	3–0	Netherlands	26–24	25–18	25–15			76–57	Report
2 Apr	16:00	Germany	3–0	Netherlands	25–17	25–15	31–29			81–61	Report
2 Apr	18:30	Portugal	0–3	Italy	14–25	19–25	20–25			53–75	Report
3 Apr	16:00	Netherlands	3–2	Portugal	28–26	23–25	25–15	22–25	15–4	113–95	Report
3 Apr	18:30	Germany	1–3	Italy	25–16	23–25	16–25	30–32		94–98	Report

=== Pool D ===
- Venue: Borisoglebskiy Sport Hall, Ramenskoye, Russia

Pos	Team	Pld	W	L	Pts	SW	SL	SR	SPW	SPL	SPR	Qualification
1	Russia	3	3	0	9	9	2	4.500	266	207	1.285	2016 European Championship
2	Poland	3	2	1	5	6	5	1.200	246	230	1.070	Third round
3	Ukraine	3	1	2	3	4	6	0.667	210	216	0.972	
4	Switzerland	3	0	3	1	3	9	0.333	201	270	0.744	

Date	Time		Score		Set 1	Set 2	Set 3	Set 4	Set 5	Total	Report
31 Mar	16:00	Poland	3–0	Ukraine	25–17	25–19	25–23			75–59	Report
31 Mar	18:30	Russia	3–1	Switzerland	25–10	18–25	25–13	25–14		93–62	Report
1 Apr	16:00	Ukraine	3–0	Switzerland	25–15	25–15	25–15			75–45	Report
1 Apr	18:30	Poland	0–3	Russia	21–25	23–25	25–27			69–77	Report
2 Apr	16:00	Switzerland	2–3	Poland	25–19	17–25	15–25	25–18	12–15	94–102	Report
2 Apr	18:30	Ukraine	1–3	Russia	25–21	18–25	19–25	14–25		76–96	Report

=== Pool E ===
- Venue: Hristo Botev, Sofia, Bulgaria

Pos	Team	Pld	W	L	Pts	SW	SL	SR	SPW	SPL	SPR	Qualification
1	Bulgaria	3	3	0	7	9	4	2.250	293	247	1.186	2016 European Championship
2	Finland	3	2	1	7	8	4	2.000	267	241	1.108	Third round
3	Estonia	3	1	2	3	4	7	0.571	233	246	0.947	
4	Norway	3	0	3	1	3	9	0.333	220	279	0.789	

Date	Time		Score		Set 1	Set 2	Set 3	Set 4	Set 5	Total	Report
1 Apr	16:30	Estonia	1–3	Finland	25–17	19–25	23–25	12–25		79–92	Report
1 Apr	19:00	Bulgaria	3–2	Norway	19–25	25–14	23–25	25–22	15–4	107–90	Report
2 Apr	16:00	Finland	3–0	Norway	25–13	25–20	25–18			75–51	Report
2 Apr	18:30	Estonia	0–3	Bulgaria	14–25	22–25	21–25			57–75	Report
3 Apr	16:00	Norway	1–3	Estonia	25–22	13–25	20–25	21–25		79–97	Report
3 Apr	18:30	Finland	2–3	Bulgaria	22–25	25–23	20–25	25–23	8–15	100–111	Report

=== Pool F ===
- Venue: Riga 49 School Sport Complex, Riga, Latvia

Pos	Team	Pld	W	L	Pts	SW	SL	SR	SPW	SPL	SPR	Qualification
1	France	3	2	1	6	6	3	2.000	211	153	1.379	2016 European Championship
2	Slovenia	3	2	1	6	6	4	1.500	224	221	1.014	Third round
3	Latvia	3	2	1	6	6	4	1.500	225	222	1.014	Third round
4	Azerbaijan	3	0	3	0	2	9	0.222	206	270	0.763	

Date	Time		Score		Set 1	Set 2	Set 3	Set 4	Set 5	Total	Report
1 Apr	16:30	France	0–3	Slovenia	22–25	21–25	18–25			61–75	Report
1 Apr	19:00	Latvia	3–1	Azerbaijan	22–25	25–22	25–16	30–28		102–91	Report
2 Apr	15:30	Slovenia	3–1	Azerbaijan	18–25	25–18	25–23	25–18		93–84	Report
2 Apr	18:00	France	3–0	Latvia	25–21	25–15	25–11			75–47	Report
3 Apr	15:30	Azerbaijan	0–3	France	14–25	9–25	8–25			31–75	Report
3 Apr	18:00	Slovenia	0–3	Latvia	11–25	21–25	24–26			56–76	Report

=== Pool G ===
- Venue: Stadionhal 1, Brøndby, Denmark

Pos	Team	Pld	W	L	Pts	SW	SL	SR	SPW	SPL	SPR	Qualification
1	Belgium	3	3	0	9	9	1	9.000	247	147	1.680	2016 European Championship
2	Czech Republic	3	2	1	6	7	4	1.750	241	241	1.000	Third round
3	Austria	3	1	2	3	4	6	0.667	214	221	0.968	
4	Denmark	3	0	3	0	0	9	0.000	138	231	0.597	

Date	Time		Score		Set 1	Set 2	Set 3	Set 4	Set 5	Total	Report
31 Mar	16:30	Belgium	3–0	Austria	25–16	25–19	25–14			75–49	Report
31 Mar	19:00	Denmark	0–3	Czech Republic	13–25	29–31	12–25			54–81	Report
1 Apr	16:30	Austria	1–3	Czech Republic	25–18	23–25	19–25	23–25		90–93	Report
1 Apr	19:00	Belgium	3–0	Denmark	25–13	25–7	25–11			75–31	Report
2 Apr	15:00	Austria	3–0	Denmark	25–18	25–21	25–14			75–53	Report
2 Apr	17:30	Czech Republic	1–3	Belgium	18–25	25–22	14–25	10–25		67–97	Report

=== Ranking of the third placed teams ===
Pos	Team	Pld	W	L	Pts	SW	SL	SR	SPW	SPL	SPR	Qualification
1	Latvia	3	2	1	6	6	4	1.500	225	222	1.014	Third round
2	Spain	3	1	2	4	5	7	0.714	242	257	0.942	
3	Ukraine	3	1	2	3	4	6	0.667	210	216	0.972	
4	Austria	3	1	2	3	4	6	0.667	214	221	0.968	
5	Greece	3	1	2	3	4	6	0.667	203	239	0.849	
6	Estonia	3	1	2	3	4	7	0.571	233	246	0.947	
7	Netherlands	3	1	2	2	3	8	0.375	231	252	0.917	

== Third round ==
Third round will be held 7–10 July 2016. 8 teams will compete in 2 pools of 4 teams. The winners of each pools and the best runners-up will qualify for the final round.

- Pools composition

Pool H	Pool I
Serbia	Latvia
Czech Republic	Slovenia
Poland	Germany
Finland	Croatia

All times are local.

=== Pool H ===
- Venue: Sportska Hala Vlade Divac, Vrnjačka Banja, Serbia

Pos	Team	Pld	W	L	Pts	SW	SL	SR	SPW	SPL	SPR	Qualification
1	Serbia	3	3	0	9	9	2	4.500	261	186	1.403	2016 European Championship
2	Poland	3	2	1	6	7	4	1.750	243	233	1.043	
3	Finland	3	1	2	3	4	6	0.667	203	228	0.890	
4	Czech Republic	3	0	3	0	1	9	0.111	185	245	0.755	

Date	Time		Score		Set 1	Set 2	Set 3	Set 4	Set 5	Total	Report
7 Jul	16:00	Finland	1–3	Poland	20–25	21–25	25–19	17–25		83–94	Report
7 Jul	18:30	Serbia	3–1	Czech Republic	25–14	25–19	18–25	25–11		93–69	Report
8 Jul	16:00	Poland	3–0	Czech Republic	25–21	25–17	25–19			75–57	Report
8 Jul	18:30	Finland	0–3	Serbia	11–25	17–25	15–25			43–75	Report
9 Jul	16:00	Czech Republic	0–3	Finland	13–25	21–25	25–27			59–77	Report
9 Jul	18:30	Poland	1–3	Serbia	22–25	25–18	14–25	13–25		74–93	Report

=== Pool I ===
- Venue: Olympic Sports Centre, Riga, Latvia

Pos	Team	Pld	W	L	Pts	SW	SL	SR	SPW	SPL	SPR	Qualification
1	Germany	3	3	0	9	9	2	4.500	266	186	1.430	2016 European Championship
2	Croatia	3	2	1	6	7	3	2.333	228	181	1.260	2016 European Championship
3	Slovenia	3	1	2	3	4	7	0.571	170	178	0.955	
4	Latvia	3	0	3	0	1	9	0.111	155	245	0.633	

Date	Time		Score		Set 1	Set 2	Set 3	Set 4	Set 5	Total	Report
8 Jul	16:30	Croatia	1–3	Germany	25–20	14–25	20–25	19–25		78–95	Report
8 Jul	19:00	Latvia	1–3	Slovenia	25–20	23–25	20–25	14–25		82–95	Report
9 Jul	16:30	Germany	3–1	Slovenia	18–25	25–12	25–12	28–26		96–75	Report
9 Jul	19:00	Croatia	3–0	Latvia	25–8	25–12	25–20			75–40	Report
10 Jul	16:30	Slovenia	0–3	Croatia	22–25	10–25	14–25			46–75	Report
10 Jul	19:00	Germany	3–0	Latvia	25–12	25–6	25–15			75–33	Report

=== Ranking of the second placed teams ===
Pos	Team	Pld	W	L	Pts	SW	SL	SR	SPW	SPL	SPR	Qualification
1	Croatia	3	2	1	6	7	3	2.333	228	181	1.260	2016 European Championship
2	Poland	3	2	1	6	7	4	1.750	243	233	1.043	
