= 2026 Women's European Volleyball League =

European women's volleyball tournament

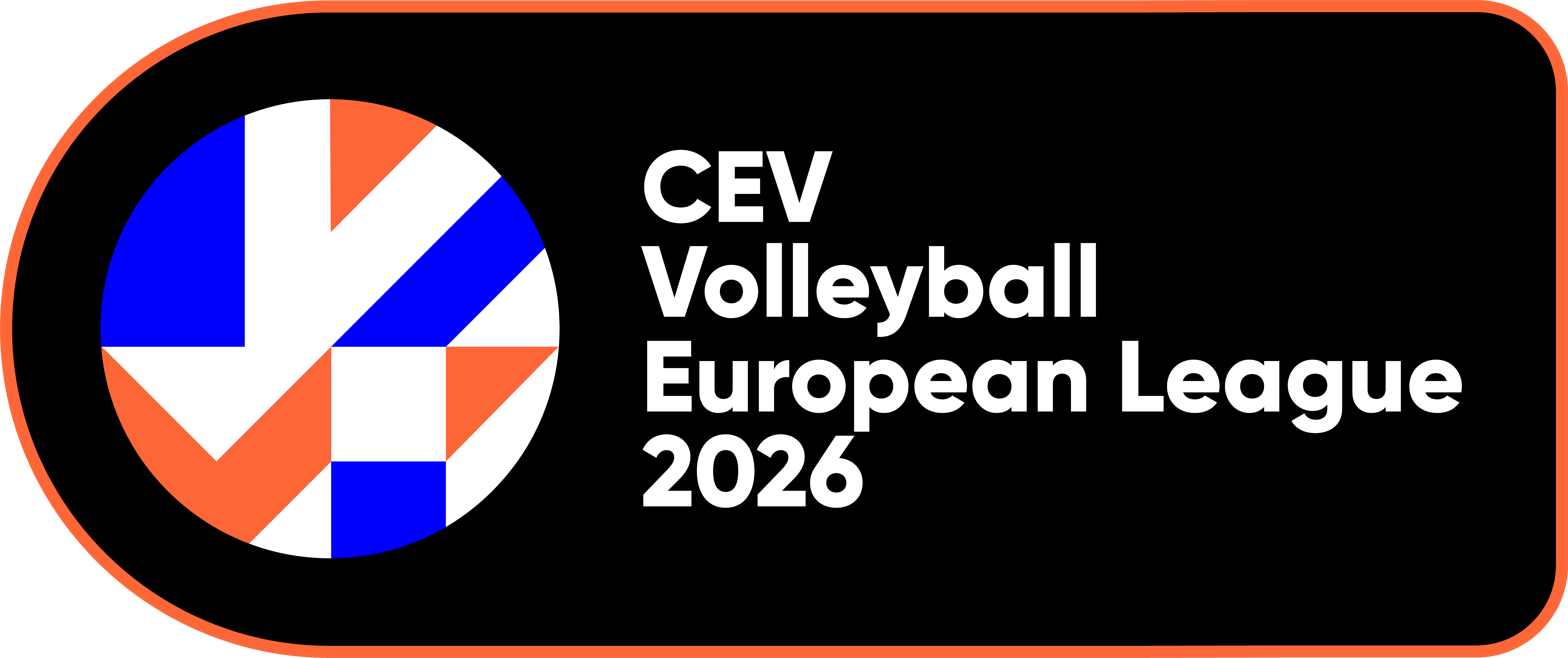
- Dates: 29 May – 11 July
- Teams: 26

Final positions
- Champions: Sweden (2nd title)
- Runners-up: Slovenia

Tournament awards
- MVP: (Sweden) Isabelle Haak

Tournament statistics
- Matches played: 84

The 2026 Women's European Volleyball League was the 17th edition of the annual Women's European Volleyball League, which featured women's national volleyball teams from European countries that didn't take part in the FIVB Women's Volleyball Nations League. The tournament took place from 29 May to 11 July 2026.

This was the first edition to be used as 2028 Women's European Volleyball Championship qualification after CEV announced the change on 8 November 2025. The top four teams qualified for the 2028 European Championship joining co-host Slovakia, Spain and two yet to be determined hosts.

As the competition was changed to act as European Championship qualification, the golden and silver leagues were merged into one big league. As well as those changes, a final six was introduced to decide the champions. However, since no hosts were found, it was reverted to a home and away final four.

== Pools composition ==
Teams were seeded according to their European Ranking for national teams as of 12 November 2025. Rankings are shown in brackets.

League phase
Romania (11)
Sweden (12)
Slovenia (13)
Spain (14)
Hungary (16)
Slovakia (17)
Greece (18)
Switzerland (19)
Finland (20)
Croatia (21)
Austria (22)
Portugal (23)
Bosnia and Herzegovina (24)
Montenegro (25)
Azerbaijan (27)
Latvia (29)
Israel (30)
Estonia (32)
Georgia (33)
Kosovo (35)
North Macedonia (36)
Iceland (37)
PR winners (Note: The identity of the team was yet to be determined at the time of the draw. The slot was later filled in by Lithuania.)
PR runners-up (Note: The identity of the team was yet to be determined at the time of the draw. The slot was later filled in by Albania.)

Preliminary round
Denmark (38)
Luxembourg (39)
Albania (–)
Lithuania (–)

== Schedule ==
The schedule was as follows:

Round	Round date
Preliminary round	29–31 May 2026
Week 1	5–7 June 2026
Week 2	12–14 June 2026
Week 3	19–21 June 2026
Final round	27 June – 11 July 2026

=== Tournament schedule ===
Preliminary round
(Denmark) Odense

Denmark (23) (H)
Luxembourg (24)
Albania (25)
Lithuania (26)

Week 1
Tournament 1 (Latvia) Riga	Tournament 2 (Azerbaijan) Baku	Tournament 3 (Montenegro) Bar	Tournament 4 (Bosnia and Herzegovina) Goražde
Latvia (16) (H); Romania (1); Israel (17)	Azerbaijan (15) (H); Sweden (2); Estonia (18)	Montenegro (14) (H); Slovenia (3); Georgia (19)	Bosnia and Herzegovina (13) (H); Spain (4); Kosovo (20)
Tournament 5 (Portugal) Vila do Conde	Tournament 6 (Austria) Schwechat	Tournament 7 (Croatia) Osijek	Tournament 8 (Finland) Nokia
Portugal (12) (H); Hungary (5); North Macedonia (21)	Austria (11) (H); Slovakia (6); Iceland (22)	Croatia (10) (H); Greece (7); Lithuania (Note: Preliminary round winners) (23)	Finland (9) (H); Switzerland (8); Albania (Note: Preliminary round runners-up) (24)
Week 2
Tournament 9 (Romania) Blaj	Tournament 10 (Sweden) Ängelholm	Tournament 11 (Slovenia) Ljubljana	Tournament 12 (Spain) Alicante
Romania (1) (H); Montenegro (14); Albania (24)	Sweden (2) (H); Bosnia and Herzegovina (13); Lithuania (23)	Slovenia (3) (H); Latvia (16); Iceland (22)	Spain (4) (H); Azerbaijan (15); North Macedonia (21)
Tournament 13 (Hungary) Kecskemét	Tournament 14 (Slovakia) Poprad	Tournament 15 (Greece) Larissa	Tournament 16 (Switzerland) Kriens
Hungary (5) (H); Croatia (10); Estonia (18)	Slovakia (6) (H); Finland (9); Israel (17)	Greece (7) (H); Portugal (12); Kosovo (20)	Switzerland (8) (H); Austria (11); Georgia (19)
Week 3
Tournament 17 (Lithuania) Šiauliai	Tournament 18 (Albania) Tirana	Tournament 19 (North Macedonia) Skopje	Tournament 20 (Iceland) Kópavogur
Lithuania (23) (H); Romania (1); Portugal (12)	Albania (24) (H); Sweden (2); Austria (11)	North Macedonia (21) (H); Slovenia (3); Croatia (10)	Iceland (22) (H); Spain (4); Finland (9)
Tournament 21 (Kosovo) Pristina	Tournament 22 (Georgia (country)) Tbilisi	Tournament 23 (Estonia) Tallinn	Tournament 24 (North Macedonia) Strumica (Note: Due to the Gaza war, Israel's tournament will be held at a neutral venue.)
Kosovo (20) (H); Hungary (5); Montenegro (14)	Georgia (19) (H); Slovakia (6); Bosnia and Herzegovina (13)	Estonia (18) (H); Greece (7); Latvia (16)	Israel (17) (H); Switzerland (8); Azerbaijan (15)

== Pool standing procedure ==
1. Total number of victories (matches won, matches lost)
2. In the event of a tie, the following first tiebreaker will apply: The teams will be ranked by the most point gained per match as follows:
  - Match won 3–0 or 3–1: 3 points for the winner, 0 points for the loser
  - Match won 3–2: 2 points for the winner, 1 point for the loser
  - Match forfeited: 3 points for the winner, 0 points (0–25, 0–25, 0–25) for the loser
3. If teams are still tied after examining the number of victories and points gained, then the FIVB will examine the results in order to break the tie in the following order:
  - Set quotient: if two or more teams are tied on the number of points gained, they will be ranked by the quotient resulting from the division of the number of all set won by the number of all sets lost.
  - Points quotient: if the tie persists based on the set quotient, the teams will be ranked by the quotient resulting from the division of all points scored by the total of points lost during all sets.
  - If the tie persists based on the point quotient, the tie will be broken based on the team that won the match of the Round Robin Phase between the tied teams. When the tie in point quotient is between three or more teams, these teams ranked taking into consideration only the matches involving the teams in question.

== Preliminary round ==
- All times are local.
- Venue: Arena Fyn, Odense, Denmark

Pos	Team	Pld	W	L	Pts	SW	SL	SR	SPW	SPL	SPR	Qualification
1	Lithuania	3	2	1	7	8	3	2.667	244	217	1.124	League round
2	Albania	3	2	1	6	8	6	1.333	297	267	1.112	League round
3	Denmark (H)	3	1	2	3	5	8	0.625	269	279	0.964	
4	Luxembourg	3	1	2	2	4	8	0.500	228	275	0.829	

Source: CEV
(H) Host

Date	Time		Score		Set 1	Set 2	Set 3	Set 4	Set 5	Total	Attd	Report
29 May	16:00	Albania	3–1	Luxembourg	21–25	25–17	25–15	25–14		96–71	40	Report
29 May	19:00	Lithuania	3–0	Denmark	26–24	25–22	25–16			76–62	150	Report
30 May	15:00	Luxembourg	0–3	Lithuania	22–25	18–25	13–25			53–75	45	Report
30 May	18:00	Denmark	3–2	Albania	25–22	25–17	17–25	21–25	15–10	103–99	140	Report
31 May	15:00	Albania	3–2	Lithuania	25–9	14–25	23–25	25–22	15–12	102–93	50	Report
31 May	18:00	Luxembourg	3–2	Denmark	21–25	25–18	25–23	18–25	15–13	104–104	170	Report

== League round ==
- All times are local.

Pos	Team	Pld	W	L	Pts	SW	SL	SR	SPW	SPL	SPR	Qualification
1	Slovenia	6	6	0	18	18	0	MAX	465	320	1.453	Final round
2	Sweden	6	6	0	18	18	1	18.000	470	313	1.502	Final round
3	Hungary	6	6	0	18	18	1	18.000	474	393	1.206	Final round
4	Slovakia	6	6	0	18	18	2	9.000	496	364	1.363	Final round
5	Switzerland	6	5	1	15	17	5	3.400	518	419	1.236	
6	Spain	6	5	1	15	15	5	3.000	475	380	1.250	
7	Greece	6	5	1	15	17	7	2.429	563	467	1.206	
8	Finland	6	5	1	14	16	5	3.200	504	402	1.254	
9	Romania	6	4	2	12	15	9	1.667	545	491	1.110	
10	Austria	6	3	3	10	12	10	1.200	480	467	1.028	
11	Croatia	6	3	3	9	11	9	1.222	466	429	1.086	
12	Azerbaijan	6	3	3	9	10	9	1.111	437	401	1.090	
13	Montenegro	6	3	3	9	9	11	0.818	438	430	1.019	
14	Bosnia and Herzegovina	6	3	3	8	10	11	0.909	459	467	0.983	
15	Portugal	6	2	4	7	9	12	0.750	454	446	1.018	
16	Latvia	6	2	4	7	10	14	0.714	528	543	0.972	
17	Lithuania	6	2	4	6	8	14	0.571	432	497	0.869	
18	Kosovo	6	1	5	3	4	15	0.267	381	442	0.862	
19	Israel	6	1	5	3	3	15	0.200	356	441	0.807	
20	Estonia	6	1	5	2	4	17	0.235	415	498	0.833	
21	Georgia	6	0	6	0	1	18	0.056	300	470	0.638	
22	Albania	6	0	6	0	1	18	0.056	299	476	0.628	
23	Iceland	6	0	6	0	0	18	0.000	286	450	0.636	
24	North Macedonia	6	0	6	0	0	18	0.000	244	450	0.542	

Source: CEV

=== Week 1 ===
==== Tournament 1 ====
- Venue: Komandu sporta spēļu halle, Riga, Latvia

Date	Time		Score		Set 1	Set 2	Set 3	Set 4	Set 5	Total	Attd	Report
5 Jun	16:30	Romania	3–2	Latvia	23–25	20–25	25–18	25–20	16–14	109–102	1,100	Report
6 Jun	15:00	Israel	0–3	Romania	18–25	23–25	23–25			64–75	22	Report
7 Jun	19:30	Latvia	0–3	Israel	21–25	22–25	23–25			66–75	1,195	Report

==== Tournament 2 ====
- Venue: A.Y.S. Sport Hall, Baku, Azerbaijan

Date	Time		Score		Set 1	Set 2	Set 3	Set 4	Set 5	Total	Attd	Report
5 Jun	18:00	Sweden	3–0	Azerbaijan	25–19	25–14	25–23			75–56	1,100	Report
6 Jun	18:00	Estonia	0–3	Sweden	18–25	25–27	21–25			64–77	50	Report
7 Jun	18:00	Azerbaijan	3–0	Estonia	25–15	25–14	25–20			75–49	1,167	Report

==== Tournament 3 ====
- Venue: Topolica Sport Hall, Bar, Montenegro

Date	Time		Score		Set 1	Set 2	Set 3	Set 4	Set 5	Total	Attd	Report
5 Jun	19:00	Slovenia	3–0	Montenegro	25–18	25–17	25–22			75–57	296	Report
6 Jun	17:00	Georgia	0–3	Slovenia	16–25	10–25	24–26			50–76	71	Report
7 Jun	19:00	Montenegro	3–1	Georgia	25–21	17–25	25–14	25–13		92–73	342	Report

==== Tournament 4 ====
- Venue: Mirsad Hurić Hall, Goražde, Bosnia and Herzegovina

Date	Time		Score		Set 1	Set 2	Set 3	Set 4	Set 5	Total	Attd	Report
5 Jun	17:00	Spain	3–0	Bosnia and Herzegovina	25–17	25–21	28–26			78–64	850	Report
6 Jun	17:00	Kosovo	1–3	Spain	9–25	18–25	25–20	17–25		69–95	310	Report
7 Jun	17:00	Bosnia and Herzegovina	3–0	Kosovo	25–18	25–22	25–23			75–63	780	Report

==== Tournament 5 ====
- Venue: Pavilhão de Desportos de Vila do Conde, Vila do Conde, Portugal

Date	Time		Score		Set 1	Set 2	Set 3	Set 4	Set 5	Total	Attd	Report
5 Jun	21:00	Hungary	3–0	Portugal	25–22	25–20	25–23			75–65	1,850	Report
6 Jun	17:00	North Macedonia	0–3	Hungary	14–25	21–25	11–25			46–75	93	Report
7 Jun	16:30	Portugal	3–0	North Macedonia	25–16	25–16	25–11			75–43	1,860	Report

==== Tournament 6 ====
- Venue: Multiversum Schwechat, Schwechat, Austria

Date	Time		Score		Set 1	Set 2	Set 3	Set 4	Set 5	Total	Attd	Report
5 Jun	17:35	Slovakia	3–0	Austria	25–22	25–20	25–15			75–57	786	Report
6 Jun	17:35	Iceland	0–3	Slovakia	10–25	15–25	19–25			44–75	127	Report
7 Jun	15:05	Austria	3–0	Iceland	25–15	25–13	25–23			75–51	435	Report

==== Tournament 7 ====
- Venue: Gradski vrt Hall, Osijek, Croatia

Date	Time		Score		Set 1	Set 2	Set 3	Set 4	Set 5	Total	Attd	Report
5 Jun	17:00	Greece	3–1	Croatia	25–27	25–13	25–19	25–23		100–82	600	Report
6 Jun	17:00	Lithuania	0–3	Greece	25–27	15–25	10–25			50–77	150	Report
7 Jun	17:00	Croatia	3–0	Lithuania	25–23	25–22	25–21			75–66	400	Report

==== Tournament 8 ====
- Venue: AGCO Power Arena, Nokia, Finland

Date	Time		Score		Set 1	Set 2	Set 3	Set 4	Set 5	Total	Attd	Report
5 Jun	18:00	Switzerland	2–3	Finland	25–20	24–26	19–25	25–23	16–18	109–112	826	Report
6 Jun	16:00	Albania	0–3	Switzerland	14–25	20–25	18–25			52–75	124	Report
7 Jun	16:00	Finland	3–0	Albania	25–8	25–19	25–16			75–43	682	Report

=== Week 2 ===
==== Tournament 9 ====
- Venue: Sala Polivalentă, Blaj, Romania

Date	Time		Score		Set 1	Set 2	Set 3	Set 4	Set 5	Total	Attd	Report
12 Jun	16:30	Albania	0–3	Romania	16–25	17–25	7–25			40–75	400	Report
13 Jun	16:30	Montenegro	3–0	Albania	25–14	25–11	25–18			75–43	40	Report
14 Jun	16:30	Romania	1–3	Montenegro	21–25	23–25	25–22	20–25		89–97	400	Report

==== Tournament 10 ====
- Venue: Catena Arena, Ängelholm, Sweden

Date	Time		Score		Set 1	Set 2	Set 3	Set 4	Set 5	Total	Attd	Report
12 Jun	19:00	Lithuania	0–3	Sweden	17–25	14–25	12–25			43–75	1,157	Report
13 Jun	16:00	Bosnia and Herzegovina	3–2	Lithuania	28–30	15–25	25–9	26–24	15–11	109–99	242	Report
14 Jun	16:00	Sweden	3–0	Bosnia and Herzegovina	25–14	25–14	25–17			75–45	1,852	Report

==== Tournament 11 ====
- Venue: Vižmarje Brod Sports Hall, Ljubljana, Slovenia

Date	Time		Score		Set 1	Set 2	Set 3	Set 4	Set 5	Total	Attd	Report
12 Jun	18:00	Iceland	0–3	Slovenia	9–25	9–25	16–25			34–75	510	Report
13 Jun	18:00	Latvia	3–0	Iceland	25–17	25–21	25–18			75–56	35	Report
14 Jun	18:00	Slovenia	3–0	Latvia	38–36	25–23	25–18			88–77	650	Report

==== Tournament 12 ====
- Venue: Pabellón Pedro Ferrándiz, Alicante, Spain

Date	Time		Score		Set 1	Set 2	Set 3	Set 4	Set 5	Total	Attd	Report
12 Jun	19:30	North Macedonia	0–3	Spain	11–25	6–25	15–25			32–75	2,116	Report
13 Jun	18:30	Azerbaijan	3–0	North Macedonia	25–13	25–15	25–18			75–46	200	Report
14 Jun	18:00	Spain	3–1	Azerbaijan	25–19	22–25	25–19	25–23		97–86	3,100	Report

==== Tournament 13 ====
- Venue: Messzi István Sports Hall, Kecskemét, Hungary

Date	Time		Score		Set 1	Set 2	Set 3	Set 4	Set 5	Total	Attd	Report
12 Jun	17:30	Estonia	0–3	Hungary	19–25	24–26	18–25			61–76	400	Report
13 Jun	16:30	Croatia	3–0	Estonia	25–19	25–14	25–14			75–47	120	Report
14 Jun	17:30	Hungary	3–1	Croatia	25–22	22–25	25–21	26–24		98–92	800	Report

==== Tournament 14 ====
- Venue: Aréna Poprad, Poprad, Slovakia

Date	Time		Score		Set 1	Set 2	Set 3	Set 4	Set 5	Total	Attd	Report
12 Jun	18:30	Israel	0–3	Slovakia	19–25	20–25	16–25			55–75	1,300	Report
13 Jun	16:00	Finland	3–0	Israel	25–14	25–19	25–17			75–50	500	Report
14 Jun	16:00	Slovakia	3–1	Finland	29–27	19–25	25–23	25–17		98–92	1,550	Report

==== Tournament 15 ====
- Venue: Larissa Neapolis Indoor Arena, Larissa, Greece

Date	Time		Score		Set 1	Set 2	Set 3	Set 4	Set 5	Total	Attd	Report
12 Jun	18:00	Kosovo	0–3	Greece	20–25	18–25	16–25			54–75	520	Report
13 Jun	18:00	Greece	3–2	Portugal	25–15	24–26	25–14	21–25	15–8	110–88	1,100	Report
14 Jun	18:00	Portugal	3–0	Kosovo	25–13	25–20	25–12			75–45	100	Report

==== Tournament 16 ====
- Venue: Pilatus Arena, Kriens, Switzerland

Date	Time		Score		Set 1	Set 2	Set 3	Set 4	Set 5	Total	Attd	Report
12 Jun	15:00	Georgia	0–3	Switzerland	15–25	16–25	12–25			43–75	810	Report
13 Jun	15:00	Austria	3–0	Georgia	25–19	25–18	25–16			75–53	190	Report
14 Jun	15:00	Switzerland	3–2	Austria	25–21	25–18	22–25	19–25	15–10	106–99	2,300	Report

=== Week 3 ===
==== Tournament 17 ====
- Venue: Šiauliai Arena, Šiauliai, Lithuania

Date	Time		Score		Set 1	Set 2	Set 3	Set 4	Set 5	Total	Attd	Report
19 Jun	19:00	Portugal	0–3	Lithuania	19–25	20–25	23–25			62–75	320	Report
20 Jun	18:00	Romania	3–1	Portugal	25–21	23–25	25–21	25–22		98–89	92	Report
21 Jun	16:00	Lithuania	3–2	Romania	25–22	25–17	19–25	15–25	15–10	99–99	602	Report

==== Tournament 18 ====
- Venue: Tirana Olympic Park, Tirana, Albania

Date	Time		Score		Set 1	Set 2	Set 3	Set 4	Set 5	Total	Attd	Report
19 Jun	16:00	Austria	3–1	Albania	25–23	23–25	28–26	25–15		101–89	318	Report
20 Jun	16:00	Sweden	3–1	Austria	25–13	25–19	18–25	25–16		93–73	107	Report
21 Jun	16:00	Albania	0–3	Sweden	8–25	9–25	15–25			32–75	78	Report

==== Tournament 19 ====
- Venue: Boris Trajkovski Sports Center, Skopje, North Macedonia

Date	Time		Score		Set 1	Set 2	Set 3	Set 4	Set 5	Total	Attd	Report
19 Jun	19:00	Croatia	3–0	North Macedonia	25–15	25–12	25–15			75–42	180	Report
20 Jun	19:00	Slovenia	3–0	Croatia	25–22	25–21	26–24			76–67	60	Report
21 Jun	19:00	North Macedonia	0–3	Slovenia	15–25	10–25	10–25			35–75	190	Report

==== Tournament 20 ====
- Venue: Digranes Sports Hall, Kópavogur, Iceland

Date	Time		Score		Set 1	Set 2	Set 3	Set 4	Set 5	Total	Attd	Report
19 Jun	16:00	Finland	3–0	Iceland	25–18	25–14	25–15			75–47	160	Report
20 Jun	16:00	Spain	0–3	Finland	21–25	19–25	15–25			55–75	75	Report
21 Jun	16:00	Iceland	0–3	Spain	23–25	16–25	15–25			54–75	165	Report

==== Tournament 21 ====
- Venue: Pallati i Rinisë, Pristina, Kosovo

Date	Time		Score		Set 1	Set 2	Set 3	Set 4	Set 5	Total	Attd	Report
19 Jun	17:00	Montenegro	0–3	Kosovo	19–25	21–25	15–25			55–75	250	Report
20 Jun	17:00	Hungary	3–0	Montenegro	25–23	25–20	25–19			75–62	250	Report
21 Jun	17:00	Kosovo	0–3	Hungary	23–25	22–25	22–25			67–75	620	Report

==== Tournament 22 ====
- Venue: (Georgia (country)) Tbilisi New Sports Palace, Tbilisi, Georgia

Date	Time		Score		Set 1	Set 2	Set 3	Set 4	Set 5	Total	Attd	Report
19 Jun	19:00	Bosnia and Herzegovina	3–0	Georgia	25–15	25–14	27–25			77–54	380	Report
20 Jun	19:00	Slovakia	3–1	Bosnia and Herzegovina	23–25	25–22	25–19	25–23		98–89	40	Report
21 Jun	19:00	Georgia	0–3	Slovakia	8–25	10–25	9–25			27–75	445	Report

==== Tournament 23 ====
- Venue: Kalev Sports Hall, Tallinn, Estonia

Date	Time		Score		Set 1	Set 2	Set 3	Set 4	Set 5	Total	Attd	Report
19 Jun	18:00	Latvia	2–3	Estonia	25–18	25–21	22–25	14–25	16–18	102–107	460	Report
20 Jun	16:00	Greece	2–3	Latvia	28–26	25–27	25–13	22–25	8–15	108–106	35	Report
21 Jun	16:00	Estonia	1–3	Greece	25–18	20–25	23–25	19–25		87–93	486	Report

==== Tournament 24 ====
- Venue: Park Sports Hall, Strumica, North Macedonia

Date	Time		Score		Set 1	Set 2	Set 3	Set 4	Set 5	Total	Attd	Report
19 Jun	18:00	Azerbaijan	3–0	Israel	25–20	25–19	25–20			75–59		Report
20 Jun	18:00	Switzerland	3–0	Azerbaijan	25–18	25–20	25–22			75–60		Report
21 Jun	18:00	Israel	0–3	Switzerland	15–25	21–25	17–25			53–75		Report

=== Results by round ===
The table listed the results of teams in each round.

Win	Loss

Team ╲ Round	1	2	3	4	5	6
Romania	W	W	W	L	W	L
Sweden	W	W	W	W	W	W
Slovenia	W	W	W	W	W	W
Spain	W	W	W	W	L	W
Hungary	W	W	W	W	W	W
Slovakia	W	W	W	W	W	W
Greece	W	W	W	W	L	W
Switzerland	L	W	W	W	W	W
Finland	W	W	W	L	W	W
Croatia	L	W	W	L	W	L
Austria	L	W	W	L	W	L
Portugal	L	W	L	W	L	L
Bosnia and Herzegovina	L	W	W	L	W	L
Montenegro	L	W	W	W	L	L
Azerbaijan	L	W	W	L	W	L
Latvia	L	L	W	L	L	W
Israel	L	W	L	L	L	L
Estonia	L	L	L	L	W	L
Georgia	L	L	L	L	L	L
Kosovo	L	L	L	L	W	L
North Macedonia	L	L	L	L	L	L
Iceland	L	L	L	L	L	L
Lithuania	L	L	L	L	W	W
Albania	L	L	L	L	L	L

Source: CEV

== Final round ==
- All times are local.

Semifinals
28 June & 1 July
Slovenia	3	3
Slovakia	0	0
27 June & 1 July
Sweden	3	3
Hungary	2	1

Final
8 July & 11 July
Slovenia	2	2
Sweden	3	3

=== Semifinals ===
Venues

- Messzi István Sports Hall, Kecskemét, Hungary
- Nitra Sports Hall, Nitra, Slovakia
- Vižmarje Brod Sports Hall, Ljubljana, Slovenia
- Idrottshuset, Örebro, Sweden

Team 1	Agg.	Team 2	1st leg	2nd leg
Slovenia	2–0	Slovakia	3–0	3–0
Sweden	2–0	Hungary	3–2	3–1

Date	Time		Score		Set 1	Set 2	Set 3	Set 4	Set 5	Total	Attd	Report
27 Jun	18:00	Hungary	2–3	Sweden	21–25	25–18	25–14	22–25	12–15	105–97	530	Report
28 Jun	18:00	Slovakia	0–3	Slovenia	16–25	24–26	16–25			56–76	1,000	Report
1 Jul	18:00	Sweden	3–1	Hungary	25–10	25–20	24–26	25–23		99–79	1,050	Report
1 Jul	20:00	Slovenia	3–0	Slovakia	25–15	25–17	29–27			79–59	360	Report

=== Final ===
Venues

- Vižmarje Brod Sports Hall, Ljubljana, Slovenia
- Idrottshuset, Örebro, Sweden

Team 1	Agg.	Team 2	1st leg	2nd leg
Slovenia	0–2	Sweden	2–3	2–3

Date	Time		Score		Set 1	Set 2	Set 3	Set 4	Set 5	Total	Attd	Report
8 Jul	18:00	Sweden	3–2	Slovenia	25–18	21–25	17–25	27–25	15–13	105–106	1,400	Report
11 Jul	20:30	Slovenia	2–3	Sweden	25–15	25–18	20–25	18–25	12–15	100–98	710	Report

== Final standing ==
Rank	Team
1st place, gold medalist(s)	Sweden
2nd place, silver medalist(s)	Slovenia
3rd place, bronze medalist(s)	Hungary
4	Slovakia
5	Switzerland
6	Spain
7	Greece
8	Finland
9	Romania
10	Austria
11	Croatia
12	Azerbaijan
13	Montenegro
14	Bosnia and Herzegovina
15	Portugal
16	Latvia
17	Lithuania
18	Kosovo
19	Israel
20	Estonia
21	Georgia
22	Albania
23	Iceland
24	North Macedonia
25	Denmark
26	Luxembourg

Qualified for the 2028 European Championship

2026 European League champions

Sweden
2nd title

== See also ==
- 2026 AVC Women's Volleyball Cup
- 2026 Copa Sudamericana (women's volleyball)
- 2026 Women's European Volleyball Championship
