= Sweden women's national under-19 volleyball team =

Youth volleyball team representing Sweden

Sweden U19
- Association: Swedish Volleyball Federation
- Confederation: CEV

Uniforms
Home	Away	Third

FIVB U19 World Championship
- Appearances: No Appearances

Europe U18 / U17 Championship
- Appearances: No Appearances
- www.volleyboll.se

The Sweden women's national under-19 volleyball team represents Sweden in international women's volleyball competitions and friendly matches under the age 19 and it is ruled and managed by the Swedish Volleyball Federation That is an affiliate of Federation of International Volleyball FIVB and also a part of European Volleyball Confederation CEV.

== Results ==
=== Summer Youth Olympics ===
Champions Runners up Third place Fourth place

Youth Olympic Games
Year	Round	Position	Pld	W	L	SW	SL	Squad
(Singapore) 2010	Didn't qualify							
(China) 2014	No Volleyball Event							
(Argentina) 2018	No Volleyball Event							
Total	0 Titles	0/1						

=== FIVB U19 World Championship ===
Champions Runners up Third place Fourth place

FIVB U19 World Championship
Year	Round	Position	Pld	W	L	SW	SL	Squad
(Brazil) 1989	Didn't qualify							
(Mexico) 2021	Didn't qualify							
Total	0 Titles	0/17						

=== Europe Girls' Youth Championship ===
Champions Runners up Third place Fourth place

Europe Girls' Youth Championship
Year	Round	Position	Pld	W	L	SW	SL	Squad
(Spain) 1995	Didn't qualify							
(Slovakia) 1997	Didn't qualify							
(Poland) 1999	Didn't qualify							
(Czech Republic) 2001	Didn't qualify							
(Croatia) 2003	Didn't qualify							
(Estonia) 2005	Didn't qualify							
(Czech Republic) 2007	Didn't qualify							
(Netherlands) 2009	Didn't qualify							
(Turkey) 2011	Didn't qualify							
2013 Q	Didn't Enter							
2015 Q	Didn't Enter							
2017 Q	Second Round	4th Placed						Squad
2018 Q	Group Stages	4th Placed						Squad
2020 Q	Second Round	4th Placed						Squad
2022 Q	Didn't Enter							
Total	0 Titles	0/15						

== Team ==
=== Current squad ===
The Following players is the Swedish players that Competed in the 2018 Girls' U17 Volleyball European Championship Qualifiacations

#	name	position	height	weight	birthday	spike	block
	angel ulrika	setter	165	60	2002	270	260
	Åström daniella	outside-spiker	175	65	2003	280	270
	Birkedal mia	setter	165	60	2002	270	260
	Dahlström matilda	opposite	180	72	2003	287	277
	Edström ida	outside-spiker	172	68	2002	275	265
	Eklund sophia	outside-spiker	175	70	2002	280	270
	Gustafsson hilda	outside-spiker	180	72	2002	283	273
	Juneholm hedda	outside-spiker	178	65	2003	280	270
	Lager elin	middle-blocker	185	78	2002	290	280
	Larsson elin	middle-blocker	187	75	2003	290	280
	Lindberg paulina	middle-blocker	189	75	2002	297	287
	Lupin nina	setter	182	70	2002	283	273
	Malm cecilia	outside-spiker	175	70	2002	293	283
	Nketia acheampong sandra	outside-spiker	168	62	2002	280	270
	Olsson louise	libero	168	60	2002	268	258
	Persson maya	libero	161	60	2003	261	251
	Scepanovic angela	middle-blocker	182	72	2002	285	275
	Torell josefine	middle-blocker	175	70	2002	286	276
