= Denmark women's national under-19 volleyball team =

Denmark U18
- Association: Danish Volleyball Federation
- Confederation: CEV

Uniforms
Home	Away	Third

FIVB U19 World Championship
- Appearances: No Appearances

Europe U18 / U17 Championship
- Appearances: No Appearances

The Denmark women's national under-18 volleyball team represents Denmark in international women's volleyball competitions and friendly matches under the age 18 and it is ruled and managed by the Danish Volleyball Federation That is an affiliate of Federation of International Volleyball FIVB and also a part of European Volleyball Confederation CEV.

== Results ==
=== Summer Youth Olympics ===
Champions Runners up Third place Fourth place

Youth Olympic Games
Year	Round	Position	Pld	W	L	SW	SL	Squad
(Singapore) 2010	Didn't qualify							
(China) 2014	No Volleyball Event							
(Argentina) 2018	No Volleyball Event							
Total	0 Titles	0/1						

=== FIVB U18 World Championship ===
Champions Runners up Third place Fourth place

FIVB U18 World Championship
Year	Round	Position	Pld	W	L	SW	SL	Squad
(Brazil) 1989 To (Mexico) 2021	Didn't qualify							
Total	0 Titles	0/17						

=== Europe U18 / U17 Championship ===
Champions Runners up Third place Fourth place

Europe U18 / U17 Championship
Year	Round	Position	Pld	W	L	SW	SL	Squad
(Spain) 1995	Didn't qualify							
(Slovakia) 1997	Didn't qualify							
(Poland) 1999	Didn't qualify							
(Czech Republic) 2001	Didn't qualify							
(Croatia) 2003	Didn't qualify							
(Estonia) 2005	Didn't qualify							
(Czech Republic) 2007	Didn't qualify							
(Netherlands) 2009	Didn't qualify							
(Turkey) 2011	Didn't qualify							
2013 Q	Second Round	6th Placed						
2015 Q	Group Stages	4th Placed						
2017 Q	Group Stages	4th Placed						
2018 Q	Group Stages	4th Placed						
2020 Q	Final	Runners-Up						
2022 Q	On Hold							
Total	0 Titles	0/14						

== Team ==
=== Previous squad ===
#	Name	Position	Height	Weight	Birthday	Spike	Block
1	SØRENSEN Veronica Kjær	Opposite	186	60	2006	297	242
2	COLGAN Erika Egebjerg	Setter	178	60	2006	275	226
3	ANDERSEN Marie Boe	Opposite	171	60	2006	277	219
4	RØJGAARD Ida Hvid	Setter	166	60	2006	257	215
5	GOTTSCHALK Sasja Rosenby	Setter	173	60	2006	269	220
6	UHRENHOLT Alma Tabermann	Outside spiker	183	60	2007	294	235
7	GJERNØ-MIKKELSEN Asta Marie	Middle blocker	176	60	2006	272	225
8	MØLLER-PETERSEN Maria Cecilie	Outside spiker	178	60	2006	278	228
9	KRISTENSEN Marie Sonne	Middle blocker	187	60	2007	288	240
10	FAUERSKOV Anna	Middle blocker	173	60	2006	269	220
11	LETH Lærke Marie Lindeborgh	Middle blocker	187	60	2007	288	240
12	BRODIE Mia Louise	Outside spiker	175	60	2006	278	227
13	JENSEN Victoria Inger Sofie	Outside spiker	180	60	2007	275	228
14	LINNET Freja	Libero	162	60	2006	264	208
15	KINDT-LARSEN Matilde	Setter	169	60	2006	274	218
16	JENSEN KJELDE Karoline	Outside spiker	183	60	2007	284	234
17	SKOVSGAARD Silje Bang	Middle blocker	182	60	2006	291	237
18	BORUP-RAUN Edel Ea	Setter	175	60	2006	268	223
19	JENSEN Johanne Skouboe	Libero	171	60	2006	261	219
20	ROSTHØJ Vera	Outside spiker	164	60	2007	263	212
21	BERTHELSEN Cornelia Susanne	Middle blocker	178	60	2007	275	230
22	CHRISTENSEN Mille Rydahl	Outside spiker	177	60	2006	281	224
23	DITLEVSEN Christina Isabella	Setter	169	60	2007	254	215
24	JENSEN Celina Brems	Opposite	168	60	2006	251	214
