= Volleyball at the 2012 Summer Olympics – Women's European qualification =

The European qualification for the 2012 Women's Olympic Volleyball Tournament is held from 27 April 2011 to 6 May 2012.

== Elimination round ==
- All times are local.
- In case of a 1–1 tie, teams play a Golden Set to determine the winner.

Team 1	Agg.	Team 2	1st leg	2nd leg
Denmark	1–1	Bosnia and Herzegovina	3–1	2–3
Sweden	2–0	Georgia	3–0	3–0
Austria	2–0	Portugal	3–0	3–0

- Denmark won the golden set 15–13.

=== First leg ===
Date	Time		Score		Set 1	Set 2	Set 3	Set 4	Set 5	Total	Report
27 Aug	16:00	Denmark	3–1	Bosnia and Herzegovina	18–25	25–17	25–22	25–22		93–86	Report
02 Sep	17:00	Austria	3–0	Portugal	25–16	25–15	25–16			75–47	Report
03 Sep	15:00	Sweden	3–0	Georgia	25–17	25–13	25–7			75–37	Report

=== Second leg ===
Date	Time		Score		Set 1	Set 2	Set 3	Set 4	Set 5	Total	Report
28 Aug	16:00	Denmark	2–3	Bosnia and Herzegovina	17–25	17–25	25–18	25–22	7–15	91–105	Report
03 Sep	17:00	Austria	3–0	Portugal	25–17	25–23	25–21			75–61	Report
04 Sep	17:00	Sweden	3–0	Georgia	25–14	25–15	25–10			75–39	Report

== Pre-qualification tournaments ==
=== Tournament 1 ===
- Venue: Yantarny Sports Palace, Kaliningrad, Russia
- Dates: 9–13 November 2011

==== Preliminary round ====
===== Pool A =====
Pos	Team	Pld	W	L	Pts	SW	SL	SR	SPW	SPL	SPR	Qualification
1	Russia	2	2	0	6	6	0	MAX	150	103	1.456	Semifinals
2	Belgium	2	1	1	3	3	3	1.000	135	122	1.107	Semifinals
3	Slovakia	2	0	2	0	0	6	0.000	90	150	0.600	

Date	Time		Score		Set 1	Set 2	Set 3	Set 4	Set 5	Total	Report
09 Nov	19:00	Russia	3–0	Slovakia	25–14	25–18	25–11			75–43	Report
10 Nov	19:00	Belgium	0–3	Russia	23–25	17–25	20–25			60–75	Report
11 Nov	19:00	Slovakia	0–3	Belgium	17–25	16–25	14–25			47–75	Report

===== Pool B =====
Pos	Team	Pld	W	L	Pts	SW	SL	SR	SPW	SPL	SPR	Qualification
1	Romania	2	2	0	6	6	1	6.000	169	143	1.182	Semifinals
2	Spain	2	1	1	3	4	3	1.333	157	146	1.075	Semifinals
3	Austria	2	0	2	0	0	6	0.000	114	151	0.755	

Date	Time		Score		Set 1	Set 2	Set 3	Set 4	Set 5	Total	Report
09 Nov	16:30	Romania	3–0	Austria	25–23	25–14	26–24			76–61	Report
10 Nov	16:30	Spain	1–3	Romania	22–25	25–18	18–25	17–25		82–93	Report
11 Nov	16:30	Austria	0–3	Spain	20–25	20–25	13–25			53–75	Report

==== Knockout round ====
Semifinal
12 November
Romania	3
Belgium	1
12 November
Russia	3
Spain	0

Final
13 November
Romania	1
Russia	3

===== Semifinals =====
Date	Time		Score		Set 1	Set 2	Set 3	Set 4	Set 5	Total	Report
12 Nov	16:30	Romania	3–1	Belgium	19–25	27–25	25–21	25–21		96–92	Report
12 Nov	19:00	Russia	3–0	Spain	25–14	25–10	25–15			75–39	Report

===== Final =====
Date	Time		Score		Set 1	Set 2	Set 3	Set 4	Set 5	Total	Report
13 Nov	18:00	Romania	1–3	Russia	17–25	25–22	11–25	18–25		71–97	Report

=== Tournament 2 ===
- Venue: Žatika Sport Centre, Poreč, Croatia
- Dates: 9–13 November 2011

==== Preliminary round ====
===== Pool A =====
Pos	Team	Pld	W	L	Pts	SW	SL	SR	SPW	SPL	SPR	Qualification
1	Netherlands	2	2	0	6	6	0	MAX	150	75	2.000	Semifinals
2	Israel	2	1	1	2	3	5	0.600	149	186	0.801	Semifinals
3	Greece	2	0	2	1	2	6	0.333	141	179	0.788	

Date	Time		Score		Set 1	Set 2	Set 3	Set 4	Set 5	Total	Report
09 Nov	16:30	Israel	3–2	Greece	12–25	25–22	25–23	27–29	15–12	104–111	Report
10 Nov	16:30	Netherlands	3–0	Israel	25–14	25–15	25–16			75–45	Report
11 Nov	16:30	Greece	0–3	Netherlands	11–25	10–25	9–25			30–75	Report

===== Pool B =====
Pos	Team	Pld	W	L	Pts	SW	SL	SR	SPW	SPL	SPR	Qualification
1	Croatia	2	2	0	6	6	0	MAX	150	103	1.456	Semifinals
2	France	2	1	1	3	3	3	1.000	134	117	1.145	Semifinals
3	Sweden	2	0	2	0	0	6	0.000	86	150	0.573	

Date	Time		Score		Set 1	Set 2	Set 3	Set 4	Set 5	Total	Report
09 Nov	19:00	Croatia	3–0	Sweden	25–15	25–13	25–16			75–44	Report
10 Nov	19:00	France	0–3	Croatia	21–25	18–25	20–25			59–75	Report
11 Nov	19:00	Sweden	0–3	France	16–25	11–25	15–25			42–75	Report

==== Knockout round ====
Semifinal
12 November
Croatia	3
Israel	1
12 November
Netherlands	3
France	0

Final
13 November
Croatia	3
Netherlands	2

===== Semifinals =====
Date	Time		Score		Set 1	Set 2	Set 3	Set 4	Set 5	Total	Report
12 Nov	16:30	Croatia	3–1	Israel	25–14	25–18	21–25	25–20		96–77	Report
12 Nov	19:00	Netherlands	3–0	France	25–14	27–25	25–20			77–59	Report

===== Final =====
Date	Time		Score		Set 1	Set 2	Set 3	Set 4	Set 5	Total	Report
13 Nov	19:00	Croatia	3–2	Netherlands	15–25	25–19	25–19	15–25	15–13	95–101	Report

=== Tournament 3 ===
- Venue: Sports Games Palace, Baku, Azerbaijan
- Dates: 9–13 November 2011

==== Preliminary round ====
===== Pool A =====
Pos	Team	Pld	W	L	Pts	SW	SL	SR	SPW	SPL	SPR	Qualification
1	Czech Republic	2	2	0	6	6	0	MAX	150	109	1.376	Semifinals
2	Ukraine	2	1	1	3	3	4	0.750	151	157	0.962	Semifinals
3	Hungary	2	0	2	0	1	6	0.167	138	173	0.798	

Date	Time		Score		Set 1	Set 2	Set 3	Set 4	Set 5	Total	Report
08 Nov	18:30	Hungary	1–3	Ukraine	25–23	15–25	19–25	23–25		82–98	Report
09 Nov	16:00	Czech Republic	3–0	Hungary	25–18	25–21	25–17			75–56	Report
10 Nov	16:00	Ukraine	0–3	Czech Republic	19–25	18–25	16–25			53–75	Report

===== Pool B =====
Pos	Team	Pld	W	L	Pts	SW	SL	SR	SPW	SPL	SPR	Qualification
1	Bulgaria	2	2	0	5	6	2	3.000	177	139	1.273	Semifinals
2	Azerbaijan	2	1	1	4	5	3	1.667	174	145	1.200	Semifinals
3	Denmark	2	0	2	0	0	6	0.000	83	150	0.553	

Date	Time		Score		Set 1	Set 2	Set 3	Set 4	Set 5	Total	Report
08 Nov	16:00	Bulgaria	3–0	Denmark	25–12	25–12	25–16			75–40	Report
09 Nov	18:30	Azerbaijan	2–3	Bulgaria	25–18	19–25	25–19	23–25	7–15	99–102	Report
10 Nov	18:30	Denmark	0–3	Azerbaijan	14–25	22–25	7–25			43–75	Report

==== Knockout round ====
Semifinal
11 November
Czech Republic	1
Azerbaijan	3
11 November
Bulgaria	3
Ukraine	1

Final
12 November
Azerbaijan	2
Bulgaria	3

===== Semifinals =====
Date	Time		Score		Set 1	Set 2	Set 3	Set 4	Set 5	Total	Report
11 Nov	16:00	Bulgaria	3–1	Ukraine	25–22	25–20	23–25	25–17		98–84	Report
11 Nov	18:30	Czech Republic	1–3	Azerbaijan	16–25	25–19	16–25	23–25		80–94	Report

===== Final =====
Date	Time		Score		Set 1	Set 2	Set 3	Set 4	Set 5	Total	Report
12 Nov	18:30	Azerbaijan	2–3	Bulgaria	12–25	25–21	18–25	25–15	9–15	89–101	Report

== Qualification tournament ==
- Venue: Başkent Volleyball Hall, Ankara, Turkey
- Dates: 1–6 May 2012
- All times are Eastern European Summer Time (UTC+03:00).

=== Pool A ===
Pos	Team	Pld	W	L	Pts	SW	SL	SR	SPW	SPL	SPR	Qualification
1	Turkey	3	3	0	9	9	1	9.000	248	199	1.246	Semifinals
2	Germany	3	2	1	6	7	3	2.333	242	198	1.222	Semifinals
3	Bulgaria	3	1	2	3	3	6	0.500	183	212	0.863	
4	Croatia	3	0	3	0	0	9	0.000	161	225	0.716	

Date	Time		Score		Set 1	Set 2	Set 3	Set 4	Set 5	Total	Report
01 May	14:00	Croatia	0–3	Germany	12–25	16–25	17–25			45–75	Report
01 May	19:00	Turkey	3–0	Bulgaria	25–21	25–17	25–15			75–53	Report
02 May	19:00	Turkey	3–0	Croatia	25–19	25–20	25–15			75–54	Report
03 May	16:30	Bulgaria	3–0	Croatia	25–21	25–21	25–20			75–62	Report
03 May	19:00	Germany	1–3	Turkey	25–18	16–25	23–25	28–30		92–98	Report
04 May	16:30	Germany	3–0	Bulgaria	25–22	25–22	25–11			75–55	Report

=== Pool B ===
Pos	Team	Pld	W	L	Pts	SW	SL	SR	SPW	SPL	SPR	Qualification
1	Poland	3	3	0	7	9	5	1.800	310	294	1.054	Semifinals
2	Russia	3	2	1	7	8	5	1.600	303	256	1.184	Semifinals
3	Netherlands	3	1	2	2	5	8	0.625	266	316	0.842	
4	Serbia	3	0	3	2	5	9	0.556	318	331	0.961	

Date	Time		Score		Set 1	Set 2	Set 3	Set 4	Set 5	Total	Report
01 May	16:30	Poland	3–1	Netherlands	25–18	25–23	23–25	25–13		98–79	Report
02 May	14:00	Serbia	2–3	Netherlands	25–20	30–28	26–28	28–30	11–15	120–121	Report
02 May	16:30	Russia	2–3	Poland	17–25	25–16	21–25	25–19	16–18	104–103	Report
03 May	14:00	Russia	3–1	Serbia	29–27	22–25	25–16	25–19		101–87	Report
04 May	14:00	Serbia	2–3	Poland	27–29	21–25	25–21	25–19	13–15	111–109	Report
04 May	19:00	Russia	3–1	Netherlands	23–25	25–11	25–16	25–14		98–66	Report

=== Final round ===
==== Bracket ====
Semifinals
5 May
Turkey	3
Russia	1
5 May
Poland	3
Germany	1

Final
6 May
Turkey	3
Poland	0

==== Semifinals ====
Date	Time		Score		Set 1	Set 2	Set 3	Set 4	Set 5	Total	Report
05 May	14:30	Poland	3–1	Germany	25–22	16–25	25–14	25–17		91–78	Report
05 May	17:30	Turkey	3–1	Russia	26–28	26–24	25–16	25–21		102–89	Report

==== Final ====
Date	Time		Score		Set 1	Set 2	Set 3	Set 4	Set 5	Total	Report
06 May	17:30	Turkey	3–0	Poland	25–22	25–22	25–19			75–63	Report

=== Final standing ===
Rank	Team
1	Turkey
2	Poland
3	Germany
3	Russia
5	Bulgaria
5	Netherlands
7	Croatia
7	Serbia

== Individual awards ==
- Best scorer
  Ekaterina Gamova (RUS)
- Best spiker
  Ekaterina Gamova (RUS)
- Best blocker
  Maria Perepelkina (RUS)
- Best server
  Dobriana Rabadzhieva (BUL)
- Best setter
  Kim Staelens (NED)
- Best receiver
  Anna Werblinska (POL)
