= 1971 Women's European Volleyball Championship =

Tournament details
- Host country: Italy
- Dates: 23 September – 1 October
- Teams: 18
- Venue: Various (in 4 host cities)

Final positions
- Champions: Soviet Union (7th title)

The 1971 Women's European Volleyball Championship was the eighth edition of the event, organised by Europe's governing volleyball body, the Confédération Européenne de Volleyball. It was hosted in several cities in Italy from 23 September to 1 October 1971, with the final round held in Reggio Emilia.

== Participating teams ==
- Austria
- Bulgaria
- Czechoslovakia
- Denmark
- East Germany
- England
- France
- Hungary
- Israel
- Italy
- Netherlands
- Poland
- Romania
- Soviet Union
- Sweden
- Switzerland
- West Germany
- Yugoslavia

== Format ==
The tournament was played in two different stages. In the first stage, the eighteen participants were divided into six groups of three teams each. In the second stage, three groups were formed, one containing the six winners from first stage groups to contest the tournament title. A second group was formed by the six runners-up from first stage groups which played for position places from 7th to 12th. The third group was formed by the six teams which finished last from first stage groups, which played for positions places from 13th to 18th. All groups in both stages played a single round-robin format.

== Pools composition ==
Pool A	Pool B	Pool C	Pool D	Pool E	Pool F
Soviet Union	Austria	Czechoslovakia	East Germany	England	Bulgaria
Sweden	Italy	France	Romania	Hungary	Denmark
Switzerland	Poland	West Germany	Yugoslavia	Israel	Netherlands

== Venues ==
Pools A, B	Pools C, D and Final round	Tournament host cities
Gorizia	Reggio Emilia	Tournament host cities
Pool E	Pool F	Tournament host cities
Imola	Modena	Tournament host cities

== Preliminary round ==
=== Pool A ===
- venue location: Gorizia, Italy

Pos	Team	Pld	W	L	Pts	SW	SL	SR	SPW	SPL	SPR	Qualification
1	Soviet Union	2	2	0	4	6	0	MAX	90	14	6.429	Final pool
2	Switzerland	2	1	1	3	3	4	0.750	62	92	0.674	7th–12th pool
3	Sweden	2	0	2	2	1	6	0.167	54	100	0.540	13th–18th pool

Date		Score		Set 1	Set 2	Set 3	Set 4	Set 5	Total	Report
23 Sep	Soviet Union	3–0	Sweden	15–1	15–5	15–1			45–7	Report
24 Sep	Soviet Union	3–0	Switzerland	15–3	15–4	15–0			45–7	Report
25 Sep	Switzerland	3–1	Sweden	15–10	10–15	15–10	15–12		55–47	Report

=== Pool B ===
- venue location: Gorizia, Italy

Pos	Team	Pld	W	L	Pts	SW	SL	SR	SPW	SPL	SPR	Qualification
1	Poland	2	2	0	4	6	0	MAX	90	23	3.913	Final pool
2	Italy	2	1	1	3	3	3	1.000	66	54	1.222	7th–12th pool
3	Austria	2	0	2	2	0	6	0.000	11	90	0.122	13th–18th pool

Date		Score		Set 1	Set 2	Set 3	Set 4	Set 5	Total	Report
23 Sep	Italy	3–0	Austria	15–2	15–2	15–5			45–9	Report
24 Sep	Poland	3–0	Italy	15–4	15–7	15–10			45–21	Report
25 Sep	Poland	3–0	Austria	15–0	15–1	15–1			45–2	Report

=== Pool C ===
- venue location: Reggio Emilia, Italy

Pos	Team	Pld	W	L	Pts	SW	SL	SR	SPW	SPL	SPR	Qualification
1	Czechoslovakia	2	2	0	4	6	0	MAX	90	20	4.500	Final pool
2	West Germany	2	1	1	3	3	5	0.600	77	87	0.885	7th–12th pool
3	France	2	0	2	2	2	6	0.333	54	114	0.474	13th–18th pool

Date		Score		Set 1	Set 2	Set 3	Set 4	Set 5	Total	Report
23 Sep	West Germany	3–2	France	10–15	15–3	14–16	15–8	15–0	69–42	Report
24 Sep	Czechoslovakia	3–0	France	15–4	15–2	15–6			45–12	Report
25 Sep	Czechoslovakia	3–0	West Germany	15–0	15–7	15–1			45–8	Report

=== Pool D ===
- venue location: Reggio Emilia, Italy

Pos	Team	Pld	W	L	Pts	SW	SL	SR	SPW	SPL	SPR	Qualification
1	East Germany	2	2	0	4	6	2	3.000	112	77	1.455	Final pool
2	Romania	2	1	1	3	5	3	1.667	108	77	1.403	7th–12th pool
3	Yugoslavia	2	0	2	2	0	6	0.000	24	90	0.267	13th–18th pool

Date		Score		Set 1	Set 2	Set 3	Set 4	Set 5	Total	Report
23 Sep	Yugoslavia	0–3	East Germany	6–15	7–15	1–15			14–45	Report
24 Sep	Yugoslavia	0–3	Romania	2–15	7–15	1–15			10–45	Report
25 Sep	East Germany	3–2	Romania	15–7	8–15	16–14	13–15	15–12	67–63	Report

=== Pool E ===
- venue location: Imola, Italy

Pos	Team	Pld	W	L	Pts	SW	SL	SR	SPW	SPL	SPR	Qualification
1	Hungary	2	2	0	4	6	0	MAX	90	23	3.913	Final pool
2	Israel	2	1	1	3	3	3	1.000	65	57	1.140	7th–12th pool
3	England	2	0	2	2	0	6	0.000	15	90	0.167	13th–18th pool

Date		Score		Set 1	Set 2	Set 3	Set 4	Set 5	Total	Report
23 Sep	Hungary	3–0	Israel	15–7	15–7	15–6			45–20	Report
24 Sep	Hungary	3–0	England	15–1	15–1	15–1			45–3	Report
25 Sep	Israel	3–0	England	15–2	15–2	15–8			45–12	Report

=== Pool F ===
- venue location: Modena, Italy

Pos	Team	Pld	W	L	Pts	SW	SL	SR	SPW	SPL	SPR	Qualification
1	Bulgaria	2	2	0	4	6	1	6.000	99	37	2.676	Final pool
2	Netherlands	2	1	1	3	4	3	1.333	74	71	1.042	7th–12th pool
3	Denmark	2	0	2	2	0	6	0.000	25	90	0.278	13th–18th pool

Date		Score		Set 1	Set 2	Set 3	Set 4	Set 5	Total	Report
23 Sep	Netherlands	3–0	Denmark	15–8	15–4	15–5			45–17	Report
24 Sep	Bulgaria	3–0	Denmark	15–2	15–3	15–3			45–8	Report
26 Sep	Bulgaria	3–1	Netherlands	9–15	15–5	15–6	15–3		54–29	Report

== Final round ==
- venue location: Reggio Emilia, Italy

=== 13th–18th pool ===
Pos	Team	Pld	W	L	Pts	SW	SL	SR	SPW	SPL	SPR
1	France	5	5	0	10	15	2	7.500	243	117	2.077
2	Yugoslavia	5	4	1	9	14	3	4.667	241	125	1.928
3	Sweden	5	3	2	8	9	8	1.125	180	193	0.933
4	Denmark	5	2	3	7	7	9	0.778	170	206	0.825
5	Austria	5	1	4	6	4	12	0.333	136	202	0.673
6	England	5	0	5	5	0	15	0.000	98	225	0.436

Date		Score		Set 1	Set 2	Set 3	Set 4	Set 5	Total	Report
27 Sep	Yugoslavia	3–0	Austria	15–6	15–0	15–8			45–14	Report
27 Sep	Denmark	3–0	England	15–12	15–10	15–13			45–35	Report
27 Sep	France	3–0	Sweden	15–2	15–5	15–7			45–14	Report
28 Sep	Yugoslavia	2–3	France	6–15	15–11	13–15	15–7	12–15	61–63	Report
28 Sep	Sweden	3–0	England	15–8	15–7	15–13			45–28	Report
28 Sep	Denmark	3–0	Austria	15–4	16–14	15–6			46–24	Report
29 Sep	Yugoslavia	3–0	England	15–1	15–5	15–1			45–7	Report
29 Sep	Sweden	3–1	Denmark	15–6	12–15	15–2	15–13		57–36	Report
29 Sep	France	3–0	Austria	15–4	15–2	15–8			45–14	Report
30 Sep	Yugoslavia	3–0	Sweden	15–9	15–4	15–3			45–16	Report
30 Sep	France	3–0	Denmark	15–6	15–9	15–3			45–18	Report
30 Sep	Austria	3–0	England	15–6	15–4	15–8			45–18	Report
1 Oct	Yugoslavia	3–0	Denmark	15–12	15–2	15–11			45–25	Report
1 Oct	France	3–0	England	15–6	15–1	15–3			45–10	Report
1 Oct	Sweden	3–1	Austria	3–15	15–8	15–7	15–9		48–39	Report

=== 7th–12th pool ===
Pos	Team	Pld	W	L	Pts	SW	SL	SR	SPW	SPL	SPR
1	Romania	5	5	0	10	15	0	MAX	225	70	3.214
2	Italy	5	4	1	9	12	5	2.400	212	191	1.110
3	Netherlands	5	3	2	8	9	8	1.125	201	201	1.000
4	West Germany	5	2	3	7	9	11	0.818	231	240	0.963
5	Israel	5	1	4	6	6	12	0.500	170	231	0.736
6	Switzerland	5	0	5	5	0	15	0.000	119	225	0.529

Date		Score		Set 1	Set 2	Set 3	Set 4	Set 5	Total	Report
27 Sep	West Germany	3–2	Israel	12–15	11–15	15–5	15–3	15–13	68–51	Report
27 Sep	Romania	3–0	Netherlands	15–6	15–3	15–0			45–9	Report
27 Sep	Italy	3–0	Switzerland	15–12	15–12	15–10			45–34	Report
28 Sep	Romania	3–0	West Germany	15–6	15–7	15–5			45–18	Report
28 Sep	Italy	3–0	Israel	15–2	15–10	15–5			45–17	Report
28 Sep	Netherlands	3–0	Switzerland	15–13	15–3	15–11			45–27	Report
29 Sep	West Germany	3–0	Switzerland	15–11	15–6	15–8			45–25	Report
29 Sep	Italy	3–0	Netherlands	15–13	15–11	15–11			45–35	Report
29 Sep	Romania	3–0	Israel	15–5	15–6	15–2			45–13	Report
30 Sep	Romania	3–0	Switzerland	15–7	15–2	15–4			45–13	Report
30 Sep	Netherlands	3–1	Israel	15–10	15–8	8–15	15–11		53–44	Report
30 Sep	Italy	3–2	West Germany	15–10	2–15	11–15	17–15	15–5	60–60	Report
1 Oct	Israel	3–0	Switzerland	15–7	15–3	15–10			45–20	Report
1 Oct	Netherlands	3–1	West Germany	14–16	15–9	15–11	15–4		59–40	Report
1 Oct	Romania	3–0	Italy	15–3	15–4	15–10			45–17	Report

=== Final pool ===
Pos	Team	Pld	W	L	Pts	SW	SL	SR	SPW	SPL	SPR
1	Soviet Union	5	5	0	10	15	0	MAX	225	92	2.446
2	Czechoslovakia	5	4	1	9	12	6	2.000	232	200	1.160
3	Poland	5	3	2	8	9	8	1.125	211	204	1.034
4	Bulgaria	5	2	3	7	8	13	0.615	213	275	0.775
5	Hungary	5	1	4	6	6	12	0.500	194	234	0.829
6	East Germany	5	0	5	5	4	15	0.267	192	262	0.733

Date		Score		Set 1	Set 2	Set 3	Set 4	Set 5	Total	Report
27 Sep	Soviet Union	3–0	East Germany	15–4	15–6	15–7			45–17	Report
27 Sep	Bulgaria	3–2	Hungary	15–9	15–9	9–15	10–15	15–10	64–58	Report
27 Sep	Czechoslovakia	3–0	Poland	15–13	15–4	15–8			45–25	Report
28 Sep	Poland	3–0	Hungary	15–11	15–12	15–12			45–35	Report
28 Sep	Soviet Union	3–0	Czechoslovakia	15–11	15–6	15–8			45–25	Report
28 Sep	Bulgaria	3–2	East Germany	15–5	11–15	15–12	7–15	15–11	63–58	Report
29 Sep	Poland	3–0	East Germany	15–11	15–12	15–10			45–33	Report
29 Sep	Soviet Union	3–0	Bulgaria	15–1	15–3	15–8			45–12	Report
29 Sep	Czechoslovakia	3–1	Hungary	9–15	15–5	15–13	15–11		54–44	Report
30 Sep	Hungary	3–0	East Germany	15–10	16–14	15–2			46–26	Report
30 Sep	Soviet Union	3–0	Poland	15–8	15–6	15–13			45–27	Report
30 Sep	Czechoslovakia	3–0	Bulgaria	15–9	15–12	15–7			45–28	Report
1 Oct	Czechoslovakia	3–2	East Germany	15–10	12–15	15–12	6–15	15–6	63–58	Report
1 Oct	Poland	3–2	Bulgaria	15–2	15–6	10–15	14–16	15–7	69–46	Report
1 Oct	Soviet Union	3–0	Hungary	15–2	15–5	15–4			45–11	Report

== Final ranking ==
Place	Team
1st place, gold medalist(s)	Soviet Union
2nd place, silver medalist(s)	Czechoslovakia
3rd place, bronze medalist(s)	Poland
4.	Bulgaria
5.	Hungary
6.	East Germany
7.	Romania
8.	Italy
9.	Netherlands
10.	West Germany
11.	Israel
12.	Switzerland
13.	France
14.	Yugoslavia
15.	Sweden
16.	Denmark
17.	Austria
18.	England

Qualified for the 1972 Olympic Games as reigning champions
Qualified for the 1972 Olympic Games as hosts
Qualified for the 1972 Olympic Games

1971 Women's European champions

Soviet Union
Seventh title
