= 2017 Girls' U18 Volleyball European Championship =

Tournament details
- Host country: Netherlands
- Dates: 1–9 April
- Teams: 12
- Venue: Sporthal Valkenhuizen (in 1 host city)

Final positions
- Champions: Russia (3rd title)

Tournament awards
- MVP: Terry Enweonwu (ITA)

The 2017 Girls' Youth European Volleyball Championship was the 12th edition of the tournament which was held in Arnhem, Netherlands from 1 to 9 April 2017. The top six teams qualified for the 2017 Youth World Championship.

== Participating teams ==
Team	Method of qualification
Belarus	Qualification pool B winner
Bulgaria	Qualification pool H winner
Germany	Qualification pool F winner
Greece	Qualification pool G winner
Italy	Qualification second best runner-up (pool B)
Netherlands	Hosts
Poland	Qualification pool D winner
Romania	Qualification best runner-up (pool E)
Russia	Qualification pool E winner
Serbia	Qualification pool A winner
Slovenia	Qualification third best runner-up (pool C)
Turkey	Qualification pool C winner

== Pools composition ==
Pool I	Pool II
Netherlands	Poland
Turkey	Greece
Bulgaria	Serbia
Russia	Belarus
Germany	Romania
Italy	Slovenia

== Preliminary round ==
- All times are Central European Summer Time (UTC+02:00).

=== Pool I ===
Pos	Team	Pld	W	L	Pts	SW	SL	SR	SPW	SPL	SPR	Qualification
1	Italy	5	5	0	15	15	1	15.000	393	300	1.310	Semifinals
2	Russia	5	3	2	9	9	7	1.286	369	355	1.039	Semifinals
3	Netherlands	5	2	3	6	9	10	0.900	432	415	1.041	5th–8th Semifinals
4	Germany	5	2	3	6	6	10	0.600	343	384	0.893	5th–8th Semifinals
5	Bulgaria	5	2	3	5	6	12	0.500	370	431	0.858	
6	Turkey	5	1	4	4	7	12	0.583	401	423	0.948	

Date	Time		Score		Set 1	Set 2	Set 3	Set 4	Set 5	Total	Report
1 Apr	14:00	Germany	0–3	Turkey	19–25	14–25	15–25			48–75	Report
1 Apr	16:30	Netherlands	1–3	Bulgaria	23–25	25–15	19–25	22–25		89–90	Report
1 Apr	19:00	Russia	0–3	Italy	22–25	21–25	19–25			62–75	Report
2 Apr	14:00	Bulgaria	3–2	Turkey	25–20	25–23	14–25	15–25	23–21	102–114	Report
2 Apr	16:30	Netherlands	3–0	Russia	25–17	25–21	25–20			75–58	Report
2 Apr	19:00	Italy	3–0	Germany	25–16	25–17	25–21			75–54	Report
4 Apr	14:00	Russia	3–0	Bulgaria	25–23	25–17	25–20			75–60	Report
4 Apr	16:30	Turkey	0–3	Italy	11–25	23–25	22–25			56–75	Report
4 Apr	19:00	Germany	3–1	Netherlands	29–27	25–20	22–25	25–16		101–88	Report
5 Apr	14:00	Bulgaria	0–3	Italy	15–25	13–25	19–25			47–75	Report
5 Apr	16:30	Russia	3–0	Germany	25–23	25–20	25–19			75–62	Report
5 Apr	19:00	Netherlands	3–1	Turkey	25–18	25–14	24–26	25–15		99–73	Report
6 Apr	14:00	Germany	3–0	Bulgaria	25–23	28–26	25–22			78–71	Report
6 Apr	16:30	Turkey	1–3	Russia	21–25	21–25	26–24	15–25		83–99	Report
6 Apr	19:00	Italy	3–1	Netherlands	18–25	25–20	25–16	25–20		93–81	Report

=== Pool II ===
Pos	Team	Pld	W	L	Pts	SW	SL	SR	SPW	SPL	SPR	Qualification
1	Belarus	5	5	0	14	15	4	3.750	458	367	1.248	Semifinals
2	Serbia	5	3	2	10	12	7	1.714	428	391	1.095	Semifinals
3	Poland	5	3	2	9	10	8	1.250	387	381	1.016	5th–8th Semifinals
4	Slovenia	5	2	3	6	8	10	0.800	389	399	0.975	5th–8th Semifinals
5	Romania	5	2	3	6	9	12	0.750	457	483	0.946	
6	Greece	5	0	5	0	2	15	0.133	318	416	0.764	

Date	Time		Score		Set 1	Set 2	Set 3	Set 4	Set 5	Total	Report
1 Apr	15:00	Greece	0–3	Belarus	18–25	17–25	14–25			49–75	Report
1 Apr	17:30	Romania	3–2	Serbia	25–21	25–21	18–25	24–26	15–13	107–106	Report
1 Apr	20:00	Poland	3–1	Slovenia	25–23	25–11	23–25	25–23		98–82	Report
2 Apr	15:00	Serbia	1–3	Belarus	20–25	16–25	25–22	16–25		77–97	Report
2 Apr	17:30	Romania	1–3	Poland	20–25	12–25	25–22	22–25		79–97	Report
2 Apr	20:00	Slovenia	3–1	Greece	25–12	25–17	22–25	25–19		97–73	Report
4 Apr	15:00	Poland	1–3	Serbia	7–25	25–20	14–25	21–25		67–95	Report
4 Apr	17:30	Belarus	3–1	Slovenia	25–20	20–25	25–12	25–15		95–72	Report
4 Apr	20:00	Greece	1–3	Romania	22–25	25–19	22–25	19–25		88–94	Report
5 Apr	15:00	Serbia	3–0	Slovenia	25–22	25–20	25–20			75–62	Report
5 Apr	17:30	Poland	3–0	Greece	25–13	25–16	25–21			75–50	Report
5 Apr	20:00	Romania	2–3	Belarus	26–28	29–27	25–27	25–18	14–16	119–116	Report
6 Apr	15:00	Greece	0–3	Serbia	22–25	22–25	14–25			58–75	Report
6 Apr	17:30	Belarus	3–0	Poland	25–20	25–16	25–14			75–50	Report
6 Apr	20:00	Slovenia	3–0	Romania	26–24	25–17	25–17			76–58	Report

== Final round ==
- All times are Central European Summer Time (UTC+02:00).

=== 5th–8th place ===
Semifinals
8 Apr
Netherlands	1
Slovenia	3
8 Apr
Germany	3
Poland	1

5th place
9 Apr
Slovenia	3
Germany	0
7th place
9 Apr
Netherlands	3
Poland	1

==== 5th–8th semifinals ====
Date	Time		Score		Set 1	Set 2	Set 3	Set 4	Set 5	Total	Report
8 Apr	15:30	Germany	3–1	Poland	25–18	25–19	22–25	25–20		97–82	Report
8 Apr	18:00	Netherlands	1–3	Slovenia	21–25	25–16	18–25	24–26		88–92	Report

==== 7th place match ====
Date	Time		Score		Set 1	Set 2	Set 3	Set 4	Set 5	Total	Report
9 Apr	12:00	Netherlands	3–1	Poland	25–12	25–12	23–25	25–23		98–72	Report

==== 5th place match ====
Date	Time		Score		Set 1	Set 2	Set 3	Set 4	Set 5	Total	Report
9 Apr	14:30	Slovenia	3–0	Germany	25–19	25–15	25–20			75–54	Report

=== Final ===
Semifinals
8 Apr
Italy	3
Serbia	2
8 Apr
Belarus	0
Russia	3

Final
9 Apr
Italy	2
Russia	3
Third place
9 Apr
Serbia	2
Belarus	3

==== Semifinals ====
Date	Time		Score		Set 1	Set 2	Set 3	Set 4	Set 5	Total	Report
8 Apr	15:45	Italy	3–2	Serbia	25–11	23–25	23–25	25–16	15–9	111–86	Report
8 Apr	18:15	Belarus	0–3	Russia	22–25	18–25	15–25			55–75	Report

==== 3rd place match ====
Date	Time		Score		Set 1	Set 2	Set 3	Set 4	Set 5	Total	Report
9 Apr	14:00	Serbia	2–3	Belarus	25–17	27–29	17–25	25–22	13–15	107–108	Report

==== Final ====
Date	Time		Score		Set 1	Set 2	Set 3	Set 4	Set 5	Total	Report
9 Apr	16:30	Italy	2–3	Russia	25–18	16–25	24–26	25–21	10–15	100–105	Report

== Final standing ==
Rank	Team
1st place, gold medalist(s)	Russia (Q)
2nd place, silver medalist(s)	Italy (Q)
3rd place, bronze medalist(s)	Belarus (Q)
4	Serbia (Q)
5	Slovenia (Q)
6	Germany (Q)
7	Netherlands
8	Poland
9	Romania
10	Bulgaria
11	Turkey
12	Greece

(Q)	Qualified for the 2017 Youth World Championship

2017 Girls' U18 European champions

Russia
Third title

12–woman roster
Varvara Shepeleva, Tatiana Kadochkina, Victoria Pushina, Olga Novikova, Olga Zvereva, Oxana Yakushina, Veronika Rasputnaia, Yulia Brovkina, Irina Soboleva, Maria Bogovskaia, Valeriya Shevchuk, Angelina Nikashova
Head coach
Alexander Karikov

== Awards ==
At the conclusion of the tournament, the following players were selected as the tournament dream team.

- Most valuable player
  Terry Enweonwu (ITA)
- Best setter
  Rachele Morello (ITA)
- Best outside spikers
  Elena Pietrini (ITA)
  Valeriya Shevchuk (RUS)
- Best middle blockers
  Viktoriia Pushina (RUS)
  Yuliya Kisliuk (BLR)
- Best opposite spiker
  Terry Enweonwu (ITA)
- Best libero
  Mila Kocic (SRB)
