= 1963 Women's European Volleyball Championship =

Tournament details
- Host country: Romania
- Dates: 22 October – 2 November
- Teams: 13
- Venue: Various (in 4 host cities)

Final positions
- Champions: Soviet Union (5th title)

The 1963 Women's European Volleyball Championship was the sixth edition of the event, organised by Europe's governing volleyball body, the Confédération Européenne de Volleyball. It was hosted in several cities in Romania from 22 October to 2 November 1963, with the final round held in Constanţa.

== Participating teams ==
- Austria
- Bulgaria
- Czechoslovakia
- Denmark
- East Germany
- Hungary
- Netherlands
- Poland
- Romania
- Soviet Union
- Turkey
- West Germany
- Yugoslavia

== Format ==
The tournament was played in two different stages. In the first stage, the thirteen participants were divided into four groups (three groups of three teams and one group of four teams). In the second stage, two groups were formed, one containing the winners and runners-up from all first stage groups (eight teams in total) to contest the tournament title. A second group was formed by the remaining five teams which played for position places (9th to 13th). All groups in both stages played a single round-robin format.

== Pools composition ==
Pool A	Pool B	Pool C	Pool D
Bulgaria	Czechoslovakia	Poland	Austria
Soviet Union	Denmark	West Germany	East Germany
Turkey	Hungary	Yugoslavia	Romania
Turkey	Netherlands	Yugoslavia	Romania

== Venues ==
Pool A	Pool B	Tournament host cities
Bucharest	Craiova	Tournament host cities
Pools C, D and Final pool	9th–13th pool	Tournament host cities
Constanța	Brașov	Tournament host cities

== Preliminary round ==
=== Pool A ===
- venue location: Bucharest, Romania

Pos	Team	Pld	W	L	Pts	SW	SL	SR	SPW	SPL	SPR	Qualification
1	Soviet Union	2	2	0	4	6	0	MAX	90	31	2.903	Final pool
2	Bulgaria	2	1	1	3	3	3	1.000	72	52	1.385	Final pool
3	Turkey	2	0	2	2	0	6	0.000	11	90	0.122	9th–13th pool

Date		Score		Set 1	Set 2	Set 3	Set 4	Set 5	Total	Report
22 Oct	Bulgaria	3–0	Turkey	15–4	15–3	15–0			45–7	Report
23 Oct	Soviet Union	3–0	Bulgaria	15–8	15–10	15–9			45–27	Report
24 Oct	Soviet Union	3–0	Turkey	15–1	15–3	15–0			45–4	Report

=== Pool B ===
- venue location: Craiova, Romania

Pos	Team	Pld	W	L	Pts	SW	SL	SR	SPW	SPL	SPR	Qualification
1	Czechoslovakia	3	3	0	6	9	2	4.500	160	107	1.495	Final pool
2	Hungary	3	2	1	5	7	3	2.333	133	98	1.357	Final pool
3	Netherlands	3	1	2	4	4	6	0.667	134	110	1.218	9th–13th pool
4	Denmark	3	0	3	3	0	9	0.000	23	135	0.170	9th–13th pool

Date		Score		Set 1	Set 2	Set 3	Set 4	Set 5	Total	Report
22 Oct	Czechoslovakia	3–0	Denmark	15–6	15–4	15–2			45–12	Report
22 Oct	Hungary	3–0	Netherlands	15–11	15–11	16–14			46–36	Report
23 Oct	Netherlands	3–0	Denmark	15–0	15–2	15–2			45–4	Report
23 Oct	Czechoslovakia	3–1	Hungary	15–3	9–15	15–10	16–14		55–42	Report
24 Oct	Hungary	3–0	Denmark	15–0	15–5	15–2			45–7	Report
24 Oct	Czechoslovakia	3–1	Netherlands	15–13	18–16	12–15	15–9		60–53	Report

=== Pool C ===
- venue location: Constanța, Romania

Pos	Team	Pld	W	L	Pts	SW	SL	SR	SPW	SPL	SPR	Qualification
1	Poland	2	2	0	4	6	0	MAX	90	37	2.432	Final pool
2	Yugoslavia	2	1	1	3	3	4	0.750	84	87	0.966	Final pool
3	West Germany	2	0	2	2	1	6	0.167	54	104	0.519	9th–13th pool

Date		Score		Set 1	Set 2	Set 3	Set 4	Set 5	Total	Report
22 Oct	Poland	3–0	West Germany	15–1	15–6	15–5			45–12	Report
23 Oct	Yugoslavia	0–3	Poland	10–15	7–15	8–15			25–45	Report
24 Oct	Yugoslavia	3–1	West Germany	16–14	15–2	13–15	15–11		59–42	Report

=== Pool D ===
- venue location: Constanța, Romania

Pos	Team	Pld	W	L	Pts	SW	SL	SR	SPW	SPL	SPR	Qualification
1	Romania	2	2	0	4	6	1	6.000	106	48	2.208	Final pool
2	East Germany	2	1	1	3	4	3	1.333	90	62	1.452	Final pool
3	Austria	2	0	2	2	0	6	0.000	4	90	0.044	9th–13th pool

Date		Score		Set 1	Set 2	Set 3	Set 4	Set 5	Total	Report
22 Oct	Romania	3–0	Austria	15–0	15–0	15–3			45–3	Report
23 Oct	Romania	3–1	East Germany	15–12	16–18	15–12	15–3		61–45	Report
24 Oct	East Germany	3–0	Austria	15–1	15–0	15–0			45–1	Report

== Final round ==
=== 9th–13th pool ===
- venue location: Brașov, Romania

Pos	Team	Pld	W	L	Pts	SW	SL	SR	SPW	SPL	SPR
1	Netherlands	4	4	0	8	12	0	MAX	180	49	3.673
2	Turkey	4	3	1	7	9	4	2.250	176	120	1.467
3	West Germany	4	2	2	6	7	6	1.167	160	145	1.103
4	Austria	4	1	3	5	3	11	0.273	100	197	0.508
5	Denmark	4	0	4	4	2	12	0.167	97	202	0.480

Date		Score		Set 1	Set 2	Set 3	Set 4	Set 5	Total	Report
26 Oct	Turkey	3–0	Denmark	15–9	15–5	15–2			45–16	Report
26 Oct	Netherlands	3–0	Austria	15–1	15–0	15–0			45–1	Report
27 Oct	Netherlands	3–0	Denmark	15–0	15–2	15–2			45–4	Report
27 Oct	Turkey	3–1	West Germany	19–17	12–15	15–7	15–12		61–51	Report
28 Oct	Austria	3–2	Denmark	15–6	14–16	8–15	15–12	15–13	67–62	Report
28 Oct	Netherlands	3–0	West Germany	15–8	15–8	15–3			45–19	Report
29 Oct	West Germany	3–0	Austria	15–11	15–9	15–4			45–24	Report
29 Oct	Netherlands	3–0	Turkey	15–8	15–8	15–9			45–25	Report
30 Oct	West Germany	3–0	Denmark	15–6	15–4	15–5			45–15	Report
30 Oct	Turkey	3–0	Austria	15–2	15–3	15–3			45–8	Report

=== Final pool ===
- venue location: Constanța, Romania

Pos	Team	Pld	W	L	Pts	SW	SL	SR	SPW	SPL	SPR
1	Soviet Union	7	7	0	14	21	2	10.500	338	149	2.268
2	Poland	7	6	1	13	20	8	2.500	378	294	1.286
3	Romania	7	5	2	12	15	10	1.500	302	305	0.990
4	East Germany	7	4	3	11	15	9	1.667	299	270	1.107
5	Bulgaria	7	3	4	10	13	16	0.813	322	335	0.961
6	Czechoslovakia	7	2	5	9	9	16	0.563	264	316	0.835
7	Hungary	7	1	6	8	6	20	0.300	270	365	0.740
8	Yugoslavia	7	0	7	7	3	21	0.143	218	357	0.611

Date		Score		Set 1	Set 2	Set 3	Set 4	Set 5	Total	Report
26 Oct	Yugoslavia	2–3	Hungary	12–15	15–13	10–15	16–14	8–15	61–72	Report
26 Oct	Poland	3–2	East Germany	15–12	10–15	13–15	15–3	15–9	68–54	Report
26 Oct	Soviet Union	3–0	Czechoslovakia	15–6	15–9	15–11			45–26	Report
26 Oct	Romania	3–2	Bulgaria	13–15	15–12	3–15	15–11	15–11	61–64	Report
27 Oct	Yugoslavia	0–3	Soviet Union	5–15	5–15	6–15			16–45	Report
27 Oct	Bulgaria	3–2	Czechoslovakia	11–15	15–0	15–8	12–15	15–7	68–45	Report
27 Oct	East Germany	3–0	Hungary	15–7	15–3	15–13			45–23	Report
27 Oct	Poland	3–0	Romania	15–12	15–11	15–5			45–28	Report
28 Oct	Romania	3–1	East Germany	15–12	16–18	15–12	15–3		61–45	Report
28 Oct	Yugoslavia	1–3	Bulgaria	15–12	0–15	0–15	11–15		31–57	Report
28 Oct	Soviet Union	3–0	Hungary	15–11	15–8	15–2			45–21	Report
28 Oct	Poland	3–0	Czechoslovakia	15–2	17–15	15–10			47–27	Report
29 Oct	Yugoslavia	0–3	Poland	10–15	7–15	8–15			25–45	Report
29 Oct	Bulgaria	3–1	Hungary	15–4	13–15	16–14	15–11		59–44	Report
29 Oct	Soviet Union	3–0	East Germany	15–11	15–4	15–2			45–17	Report
29 Oct	Romania	3–1	Czechoslovakia	5–15	15–11	15–6	16–14		51–46	Report
31 Oct	Soviet Union	3–0	Bulgaria	15–1	15–3	15–0			45–4	Report
31 Oct	Yugoslavia	0–3	Romania	7–15	12–15	11–15			30–45	Report
31 Oct	Poland	3–1	Hungary	15–5	15–6	10–15	15–12		55–38	Report
31 Oct	East Germany	3–0	Czechoslovakia	15–7	15–6	15–7			45–20	Report
1 Nov	Yugoslavia	0–3	Czechoslovakia	2–15	9–15	7–15			18–45	Report
1 Nov	East Germany	3–0	Bulgaria	15–7	15–5	15–4			45–16	Report
1 Nov	Soviet Union	3–2	Poland	8–15	15–8	15–17	15–4	15–10	68–54	Report
1 Nov	Romania	3–0	Hungary	15–8	15–11	15–11			45–30	Report
2 Nov	Czechoslovakia	3–1	Hungary	15–3	9–15	15–10	16–14		55–42	Report
2 Nov	Yugoslavia	0–3	East Germany	11–15	10–15	16–18			37–48	Report
2 Nov	Soviet Union	3–0	Romania	15–0	15–8	15–3			45–11	Report
2 Nov	Poland	3–2	Bulgaria	15–10	15–3	5–15	14–16	15–10	64–54	Report

== Final ranking ==
Place	Team
1st place, gold medalist(s)	Soviet Union
2nd place, silver medalist(s)	Poland
3rd place, bronze medalist(s)	Romania
4.	East Germany
5.	Bulgaria
6.	Czechoslovakia
7.	Hungary
8.	Yugoslavia
9.	Netherlands
10.	Turkey
11.	West Germany
12.	Austria
13.	Denmark

1963 Women's European champions

Soviet Union
Fifth title
