= 2017 Girls' U18 Volleyball European Championship Qualification =

This is an article about qualification for the 2017 Girls' Youth European Volleyball Championship.

== Qualification summary ==
=== Participating teams ===
The following 35 teams took part at the qualification tournament.

- Austria
- Azerbaijan
- Belarus
- Belgium
- Bulgaria
- Croatia
- Czech Republic
- Denmark
- Estonia
- Finland
- France
- Georgia
- Germany
- Greece
- Hungary
- Iceland
- Israel
- Italy
- Kosovo
- Latvia
- Lithuania
- Montenegro
- Norway
- Poland
- Portugal
- Romania
- Russia
- Serbia
- Slovakia
- Slovenia
- Spain
- Sweden
- Switzerland
- Turkey
- Ukraine

=== Qualified teams ===
At the end of qualification, the following 12 teams progressed to the tournament final round.

| Team | Method of qualification |
|---|---|
| Belarus | Pool B winners |
| Bulgaria | Pool H winners |
| Germany | Pool F winners |
| Greece | Pool G winners |
| Italy | Pool B runner-up |
| Netherlands | Hosts |
| Poland | Pool D winners |
| Romania | Pool E runner-up |
| Russia | Pool E winners |
| Serbia | Pool A winners |
| Slovenia | Pool C runner-up |
| Turkey | Pool C winners |

== Pool standing procedure ==
1. Number of matches won
2. Match points
3. Sets ratio
4. Points ratio
5. Result of the last match between the tied teams

Match won 3–0 or 3–1: 3 match points for the winner, 0 match points for the loser
Match won 3–2: 2 match points for the winner, 1 match point for the loser

== First round ==
- Four teams competed in round-robin with the winner advancing to the second round.
- venue: Frejahallen, Falköping, Sweden
- 28–29 October times are Central European Summer Time (UTC+02:00) and 30 October times are Central European Time (UTC+01:00)

=== Pool 1 ===
| Pos | Team | Pld | W | L | Pts | SW | SL | SR | SPW | SPL | SPR | Qualification |
|---|---|---|---|---|---|---|---|---|---|---|---|---|
| 1 | Sweden | 3 | 3 | 0 | 9 | 9 | 0 | MAX | 225 | 128 | 1.758 | Second round |
| 2 | Kosovo | 3 | 2 | 1 | 5 | 6 | 5 | 1.200 | 208 | 238 | 0.874 | |
| 3 | Georgia | 3 | 1 | 2 | 4 | 5 | 6 | 0.833 | 234 | 225 | 1.040 | |
| 4 | Iceland | 3 | 0 | 3 | 0 | 0 | 9 | 0.000 | 149 | 225 | 0.662 | |

| Date | Time | | Score | | Set 1 | Set 2 | Set 3 | Set 4 | Set 5 | Total | Report |
|---|---|---|---|---|---|---|---|---|---|---|---|
| 28 Oct | 15:00 | Iceland | 0–3 | Sweden | 13–25 | 13–25 | 12–25 | | | 38–75 | Report |
| 28 Oct | 18:00 | Georgia | 2–3 | Kosovo | 25–17 | 21–25 | 20–25 | 25–16 | 13–15 | 104–98 | Report |
| 29 Oct | 15:00 | Sweden | 3–0 | Kosovo | 25–9 | 25–17 | 25–9 | | | 75–35 | Report |
| 29 Oct | 18:00 | Iceland | 0–3 | Georgia | 16–25 | 16–25 | 20–25 | | | 52–75 | Report |
| 30 Oct | 15:00 | Kosovo | 3–0 | Iceland | 25–15 | 25–22 | 25–22 | | | 75–59 | Report |
| 30 Oct | 18:00 | Sweden | 3–0 | Georgia | 25–17 | 25–17 | 25–21 | | | 75–55 | Report |

== Second round ==
- Teams are divided into eight pools of four teams each. A round-robin takes place within each pool with the pool winners and the three best second place teams qualifying to the final round.
- Pools composition

| Pool A | Pool B | Pool C | Pool D | Pool E | Pool F | Pool G | Pool H |
|---|---|---|---|---|---|---|---|
| Serbia | Italy | Turkey | Poland | Russia | Germany | Greece | Belgium |
| Montenegro | Belarus | Slovenia | Czech Rep. | Romania | Hungary | Finland | Bulgaria |
| Ukraine | Slovakia | France | Lithuania | Portugal | Spain | Croatia | Austria |
| Latvia | Israel | Sweden | Estonia | Azerbaijan | Denmark | Norway | Switzerland |

=== Pool A ===
- venue: Sports Hall Daugava, Riga, Latvia
- All times are Eastern European Time (UTC+02:00)

| Pos | Team | Pld | W | L | Pts | SW | SL | SR | SPW | SPL | SPR | Qualification |
|---|---|---|---|---|---|---|---|---|---|---|---|---|
| 1 | Serbia | 3 | 3 | 0 | 9 | 9 | 0 | MAX | 225 | 130 | 1.731 | 2017 European Championship |
| 2 | Ukraine | 3 | 2 | 1 | 5 | 6 | 6 | 1.000 | 243 | 249 | 0.976 | |
| 3 | Latvia | 3 | 1 | 2 | 3 | 5 | 8 | 0.625 | 232 | 276 | 0.841 | |
| 4 | Montenegro | 3 | 0 | 3 | 1 | 3 | 9 | 0.333 | 234 | 279 | 0.839 | |

| Date | Time | | Score | | Set 1 | Set 2 | Set 3 | Set 4 | Set 5 | Total | Report |
|---|---|---|---|---|---|---|---|---|---|---|---|
| 13 Jan | 16:30 | Montenegro | 0–3 | Serbia | 10–25 | 23–25 | 23–25 | | | 56–75 | Report |
| 13 Jan | 19:00 | Latvia | 2–3 | Ukraine | 25–17 | 12–25 | 25–23 | 19–25 | 11–15 | 92–105 | Report |
| 14 Jan | 15:30 | Serbia | 3–0 | Ukraine | 25–18 | 25–12 | 25–8 | | | 75–38 | Report |
| 14 Jan | 18:00 | Montenegro | 2–3 | Latvia | 20–25 | 17–25 | 25–21 | 25–18 | 9–15 | 96–104 | Report |
| 15 Jan | 15:30 | Ukraine | 3–1 | Montenegro | 26–24 | 25–10 | 24–26 | 25–22 | | 100–82 | Report |
| 15 Jan | 18:00 | Serbia | 3–0 | Latvia | 25–15 | 25–11 | 25–10 | | | 75–36 | Report |

=== Pool B ===
- venue: Centro Pavesi, Milan, Italy
- All times are Central European Time (UTC+01:00)

| Pos | Team | Pld | W | L | Pts | SW | SL | SR | SPW | SPL | SPR | Qualification |
|---|---|---|---|---|---|---|---|---|---|---|---|---|
| 1 | Belarus | 3 | 3 | 0 | 8 | 9 | 3 | 3.000 | 270 | 220 | 1.227 | 2017 European Championship |
| 2 | Italy | 3 | 2 | 1 | 6 | 7 | 3 | 2.333 | 239 | 166 | 1.440 | 2017 European Championship |
| 3 | Slovakia | 3 | 1 | 2 | 4 | 5 | 6 | 0.833 | 202 | 226 | 0.894 | |
| 4 | Israel | 3 | 0 | 3 | 0 | 0 | 9 | 0.000 | 126 | 225 | 0.560 | |

| Date | Time | | Score | | Set 1 | Set 2 | Set 3 | Set 4 | Set 5 | Total | Report |
|---|---|---|---|---|---|---|---|---|---|---|---|
| 13 Jan | 16:00 | Belarus | 3–2 | Slovakia | 20–25 | 21–25 | 25–16 | 25–9 | 15–8 | 106–83 | Report |
| 13 Jan | 18:30 | Italy | 3–0 | Israel | 25–10 | 25–11 | 25–12 | | | 75–33 | Report |
| 14 Jan | 16:00 | Slovakia | 3–0 | Israel | 25–15 | 25–18 | 25–12 | | | 75–45 | Report |
| 14 Jan | 18:30 | Belarus | 3–1 | Italy | 25–22 | 25–23 | 14–25 | 25–19 | | 89–89 | Report |
| 15 Jan | 16:00 | Israel | 0–3 | Belarus | 13–25 | 19–25 | 16–25 | | | 48–75 | Report |
| 15 Jan | 18:30 | Slovakia | 0–3 | Italy | 18–25 | 15–25 | 11–25 | | | 44–75 | Report |

=== Pool C ===
- venue: Sportna Dvorana, Nova Gorica, Slovenia
- All times are Central European Time (UTC+01:00)

| Pos | Team | Pld | W | L | Pts | SW | SL | SR | SPW | SPL | SPR | Qualification |
|---|---|---|---|---|---|---|---|---|---|---|---|---|
| 1 | Turkey | 3 | 3 | 0 | 9 | 9 | 1 | 9.000 | 247 | 176 | 1.403 | 2017 European Championship |
| 2 | Slovenia | 3 | 2 | 1 | 6 | 7 | 3 | 2.333 | 212 | 192 | 1.104 | 2017 European Championship |
| 3 | France | 3 | 1 | 2 | 3 | 3 | 6 | 0.500 | 196 | 204 | 0.961 | |
| 4 | Sweden | 3 | 0 | 3 | 0 | 0 | 9 | 0.000 | 145 | 228 | 0.636 | |

| Date | Time | | Score | | Set 1 | Set 2 | Set 3 | Set 4 | Set 5 | Total | Report |
|---|---|---|---|---|---|---|---|---|---|---|---|
| 13 Jan | 15:00 | France | 0–3 | Turkey | 22–25 | 22–25 | 16–25 | | | 60–75 | Report |
| 13 Jan | 18:00 | Slovenia | 3–0 | Sweden | 25–7 | 25–13 | 25–17 | | | 75–37 | Report |
| 14 Jan | 15:00 | Turkey | 3–0 | Sweden | 25–18 | 25–21 | 25–15 | | | 75–54 | Report |
| 14 Jan | 18:00 | France | 0–3 | Slovenia | 21–25 | 17–25 | 20–25 | | | 58–75 | Report |
| 15 Jan | 15:00 | Sweden | 0–3 | France | 20–25 | 8–25 | 26–28 | | | 54–78 | Report |
| 15 Jan | 18:00 | Turkey | 3–1 | Slovenia | 25–13 | 25–13 | 22–25 | 25–11 | | 97–62 | Report |

=== Pool D ===
- venue: S.Dariaus and S.Gireno Sport Center, Kaunas, Lithuania
- All times are Eastern European Time (UTC+02:00)

| Pos | Team | Pld | W | L | Pts | SW | SL | SR | SPW | SPL | SPR | Qualification |
|---|---|---|---|---|---|---|---|---|---|---|---|---|
| 1 | Poland | 3 | 3 | 0 | 9 | 9 | 0 | MAX | 227 | 132 | 1.720 | 2017 European Championship |
| 2 | Czech Republic | 3 | 2 | 1 | 6 | 6 | 3 | 2.000 | 217 | 158 | 1.373 | |
| 3 | Lithuania | 3 | 1 | 2 | 3 | 3 | 7 | 0.429 | 170 | 225 | 0.756 | |
| 4 | Estonia | 3 | 0 | 3 | 0 | 1 | 9 | 0.111 | 150 | 249 | 0.602 | |

| Date | Time | | Score | | Set 1 | Set 2 | Set 3 | Set 4 | Set 5 | Total | Report |
|---|---|---|---|---|---|---|---|---|---|---|---|
| 13 Jan | 15:30 | Czech Republic | 0–3 | Poland | 23–25 | 19–25 | 25–27 | | | 67–77 | Report |
| 13 Jan | 18:00 | Lithuania | 3–1 | Estonia | 25–16 | 24–26 | 25–13 | 25–20 | | 99–75 | Report |
| 14 Jan | 15:30 | Poland | 3–0 | Estonia | 25–9 | 25–10 | 25–11 | | | 75–30 | Report |
| 14 Jan | 18:00 | Czech Republic | 3–0 | Lithuania | 25–12 | 25–15 | 25–9 | | | 75–36 | Report |
| 15 Jan | 15:30 | Estonia | 0–3 | Czech Republic | 14–25 | 15–25 | 16–25 | | | 45–75 | Report |
| 15 Jan | 18:00 | Poland | 3–0 | Lithuania | 25–9 | 25–16 | 25–10 | | | 75–35 | Report |

=== Pool E ===
- venue: Olimpia Sports Hall, Ploiești, Romania
- All times are Eastern European Time (UTC+02:00)

| Pos | Team | Pld | W | L | Pts | SW | SL | SR | SPW | SPL | SPR | Qualification |
|---|---|---|---|---|---|---|---|---|---|---|---|---|
| 1 | Russia | 3 | 3 | 0 | 8 | 9 | 2 | 4.500 | 260 | 164 | 1.585 | 2017 European Championship |
| 2 | Romania | 3 | 2 | 1 | 7 | 8 | 3 | 2.667 | 247 | 183 | 1.350 | 2017 European Championship |
| 3 | Portugal | 3 | 1 | 2 | 3 | 3 | 6 | 0.500 | 168 | 182 | 0.923 | |
| 4 | Azerbaijan | 3 | 0 | 3 | 0 | 0 | 9 | 0.000 | 79 | 225 | 0.351 | |

| Date | Time | | Score | | Set 1 | Set 2 | Set 3 | Set 4 | Set 5 | Total | Report |
|---|---|---|---|---|---|---|---|---|---|---|---|
| 12 Jan | 20:00 | Russia | 3–2 | Romania | 20–25 | 27–25 | 23–25 | 25–18 | 15–4 | 110–97 | Report |
| 13 Jan | 15:00 | Azerbaijan | 0–3 | Russia | 6–25 | 5–25 | 7–25 | | | 18–75 | Report |
| 13 Jan | 17:30 | Romania | 3–0 | Portugal | 25–16 | 25–15 | 25–13 | | | 75–44 | Report |
| 14 Jan | 15:00 | Portugal | 3–0 | Azerbaijan | 25–13 | 25–7 | 25–12 | | | 75–32 | Report |
| 15 Jan | 15:00 | Portugal | 0–3 | Russia | 23–25 | 16–25 | 10–25 | | | 49–75 | Report |
| 15 Jan | 17:30 | Romania | 3–0 | Azerbaijan | 25–4 | 25–12 | 25–13 | | | 75–29 | Report |

=== Pool F ===
- venue: Downtown Elementary School Sports Hall, Jászberény, Hungary
- All times are Central European Time (UTC+01:00)

| Pos | Team | Pld | W | L | Pts | SW | SL | SR | SPW | SPL | SPR | Qualification |
|---|---|---|---|---|---|---|---|---|---|---|---|---|
| 1 | Germany | 3 | 3 | 0 | 9 | 9 | 1 | 9.000 | 246 | 173 | 1.422 | 2017 European Championship |
| 2 | Spain | 3 | 2 | 1 | 6 | 6 | 4 | 1.500 | 217 | 181 | 1.199 | |
| 3 | Hungary | 3 | 1 | 2 | 3 | 5 | 6 | 0.833 | 223 | 239 | 0.933 | |
| 4 | Denmark | 3 | 0 | 3 | 0 | 0 | 9 | 0.000 | 133 | 226 | 0.588 | |

| Date | Time | | Score | | Set 1 | Set 2 | Set 3 | Set 4 | Set 5 | Total | Report |
|---|---|---|---|---|---|---|---|---|---|---|---|
| 13 Jan | 17:00 | Denmark | 0–3 | Hungary | 21–25 | 13–25 | 16–25 | | | 50–75 | Report |
| 13 Jan | 19:30 | Germany | 3–0 | Spain | 25–10 | 25–23 | 25–15 | | | 75–48 | Report |
| 14 Jan | 17:00 | Hungary | 1–3 | Spain | 11–25 | 14–25 | 25–19 | 20–25 | | 70–94 | Report |
| 14 Jan | 19:30 | Denmark | 0–3 | Germany | 14–25 | 24–26 | 9–25 | | | 47–76 | Report |
| 15 Jan | 17:00 | Hungary | 1–3 | Germany | 21–25 | 15–25 | 25–20 | 17–25 | | 78–95 | Report |
| 15 Jan | 19:30 | Spain | 3–0 | Denmark | 25–12 | 25–11 | 25–13 | | | 75–36 | Report |

=== Pool G ===
- venue: Dvorana Gimnasium, Rovinj, Croatia
- All times are Central European Time (UTC+01:00)

| Pos | Team | Pld | W | L | Pts | SW | SL | SR | SPW | SPL | SPR | Qualification |
|---|---|---|---|---|---|---|---|---|---|---|---|---|
| 1 | Greece | 3 | 2 | 1 | 6 | 7 | 3 | 2.333 | 231 | 201 | 1.149 | 2017 European Championship |
| 2 | Finland | 3 | 2 | 1 | 5 | 6 | 5 | 1.200 | 245 | 230 | 1.065 | |
| 3 | Croatia | 3 | 1 | 2 | 5 | 7 | 7 | 1.000 | 307 | 297 | 1.034 | |
| 4 | Norway | 3 | 1 | 2 | 2 | 3 | 8 | 0.375 | 203 | 258 | 0.787 | |

| Date | Time | | Score | | Set 1 | Set 2 | Set 3 | Set 4 | Set 5 | Total | Report |
|---|---|---|---|---|---|---|---|---|---|---|---|
| 13 Jan | 17:00 | Norway | 3–2 | Croatia | 16–25 | 25–20 | 15–25 | 27–25 | 15–13 | 98–108 | Report |
| 13 Jan | 19:30 | Finland | 0–3 | Greece | 19–25 | 22–25 | 11–25 | | | 52–75 | Report |
| 14 Jan | 17:00 | Croatia | 3–1 | Greece | 25–14 | 19–25 | 25–20 | 25–22 | | 94–81 | Report |
| 14 Jan | 19:30 | Norway | 0–3 | Finland | 17–25 | 15–25 | 18–25 | | | 50–75 | Report |
| 15 Jan | 17:00 | Croatia | 2–3 | Finland | 32–30 | 25–23 | 20–25 | 17–25 | 11–15 | 105–118 | Report |
| 15 Jan | 19:30 | Greece | 3–0 | Norway | 25–23 | 25–16 | 25–16 | | | 75–55 | Report |

=== Pool H ===
- venue: Hristo Botev Sport Hall, Sofia, Bulgaria
- All times are Eastern European Time (UTC+02:00)

| Pos | Team | Pld | W | L | Pts | SW | SL | SR | SPW | SPL | SPR | Qualification |
|---|---|---|---|---|---|---|---|---|---|---|---|---|
| 1 | Bulgaria | 3 | 3 | 0 | 9 | 9 | 1 | 9.000 | 249 | 189 | 1.317 | 2017 European Championship |
| 2 | Austria | 3 | 2 | 1 | 6 | 7 | 4 | 1.750 | 251 | 229 | 1.096 | |
| 3 | Belgium | 3 | 1 | 2 | 3 | 4 | 7 | 0.571 | 242 | 255 | 0.949 | |
| 4 | Switzerland | 3 | 0 | 3 | 0 | 1 | 9 | 0.111 | 174 | 243 | 0.716 | |

| Date | Time | | Score | | Set 1 | Set 2 | Set 3 | Set 4 | Set 5 | Total | Report |
|---|---|---|---|---|---|---|---|---|---|---|---|
| 12 Jan | 20:00 | Austria | 1–3 | Bulgaria | 17–25 | 25–27 | 25–22 | 12–25 | | 79–99 | Report |
| 13 Jan | 17:30 | Bulgaria | 3–0 | Switzerland | 25–14 | 25–14 | 25–17 | | | 75–45 | Report |
| 13 Jan | 20:00 | Belgium | 1–3 | Austria | 21–25 | 25–22 | 17–25 | 21–25 | | 84–97 | Report |
| 14 Jan | 15:00 | Switzerland | 1–3 | Belgium | 17–25 | 25–18 | 19–25 | 22–25 | | 83–93 | Report |
| 15 Jan | 15:00 | Switzerland | 0–3 | Austria | 19–25 | 14–25 | 13–25 | | | 46–75 | Report |
| 15 Jan | 17:30 | Bulgaria | 3–0 | Belgium | 25–20 | 25–22 | 25–23 | | | 75–65 | Report |
