= England women's national volleyball team =

Women's national volleyball team representing England

England
- Association: Volleyball England
- Confederation: CEV
- FIVB ranking: NR (29 June 2025)

Uniforms
Home	Away

The England women's national volleyball team is the national team of England. It is governed by Volleyball England and takes part in international women's volleyball competitions.
