= Arena Fyn =

Arena in Odense, Denmark

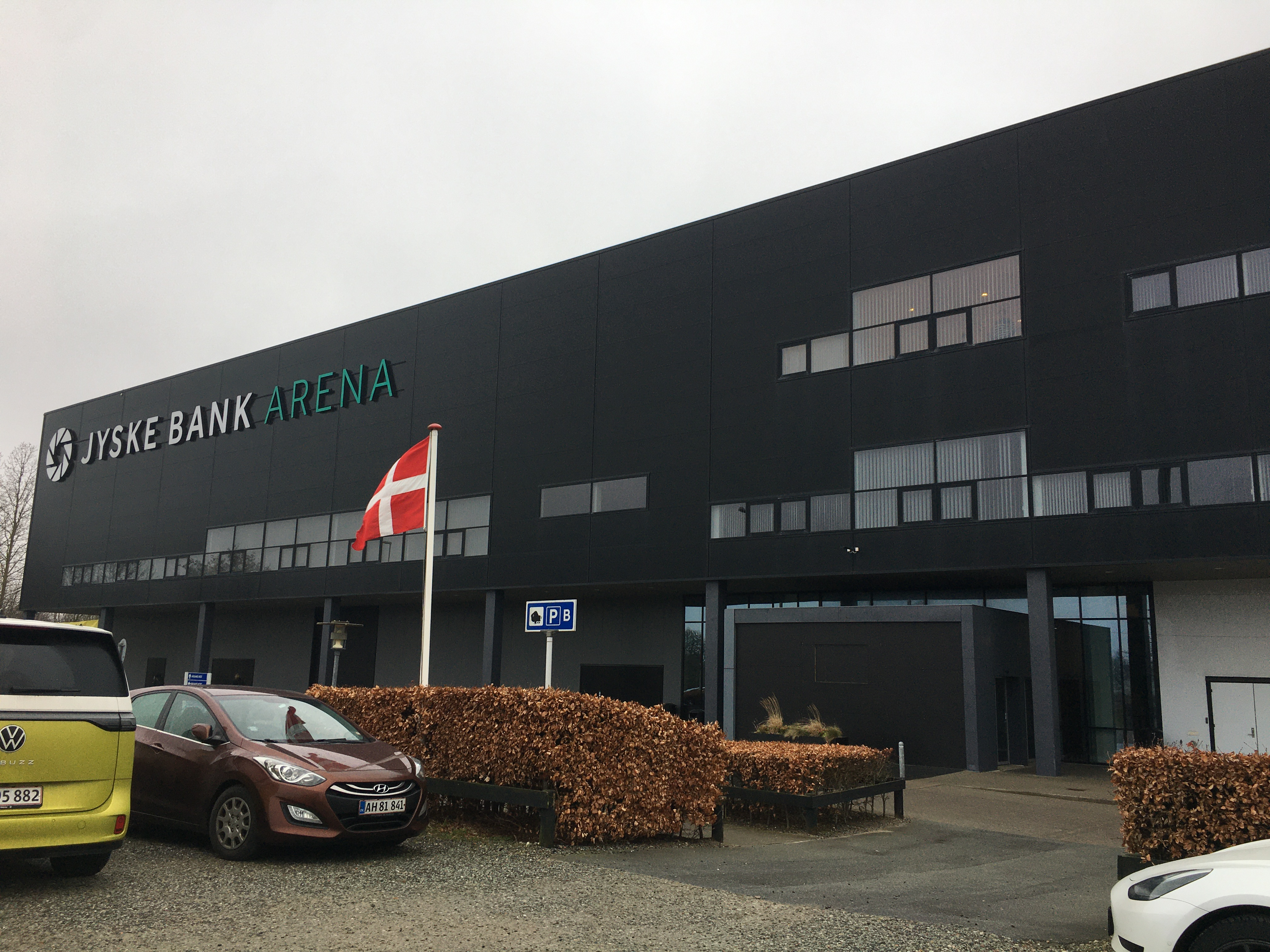
- Interactive map of Arena Fyn
- Full name: Sparrekassen Fyn Arena
- Location: Ørbækvej 350, 5220 Odense SØ
- Coordinates: 55°22′18″N 10°26′56″E
- Capacity: 4,000 (sports); 5,500 (concerts)

Construction
- Built: March 2007
- Opened: October 6, 2007
- Cost: 90,000,000 Danish kroner

Tenant
- Odense Håndbold (EHF Champions League)

Website
- www.occ.dk

Arena Fyn, officially known as the SJF Bank Arena for sponsorship reasons, is a sports and concert arena in the southeastern part of the Danish city of Odense. It has an area of 8,500 square metres (91,000 sq ft) and can accommodate 4,000 spectators at sporting events and 5,500 at concerts, where the floor is used.

== Construction ==
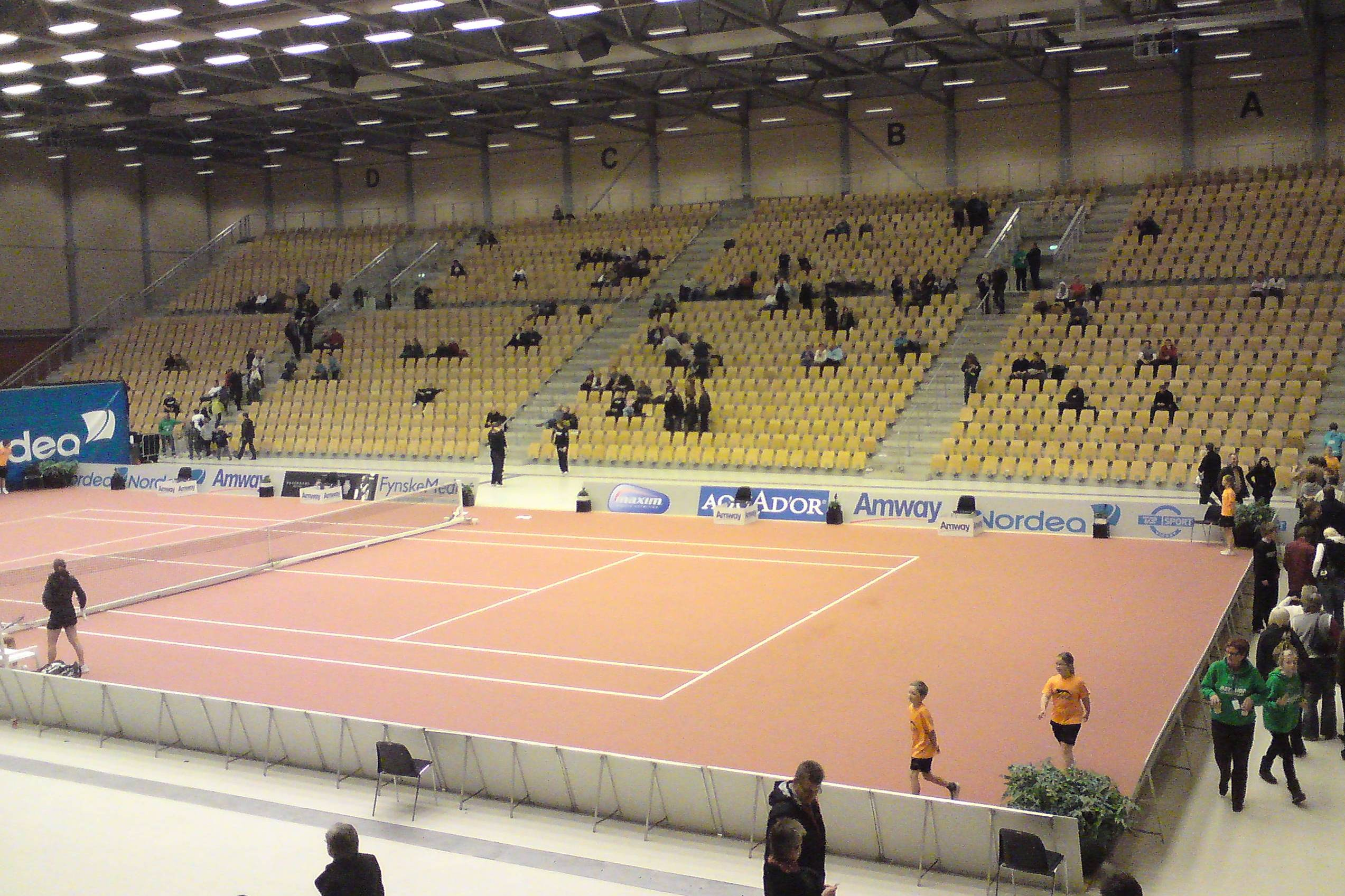
Arena Fyn hosted the 2008 Nordea Danish Open

The agreement about the construction of Arena Fyn was made in autumn 2005 and by March 2007 the arena was finished. The price of building was 90 million Danish kroner.

== Use ==
The Scottish band Travis had a concert in the arena in the October 2007. It is also used for sports, including the Nordea Danish Open. The handball HC Odense (formerly Team Odense GOG) has played their home games in the arena. The Denmark Open has been held in Arena Fyn since 2007.

The sports equipment shop Stadium has sponsored the arena since June 2010.

Arena Fyn held Dansk Melodi Grand Prix, on 8 March 2014, to select Denmark's entry for the 59th annual Eurovision Song Contest 2014, in Copenhagen. One week later, Arena Fyn held MGP Junior, a kids version of Dansk Melodi Grand Prix.

== See also ==
- List of indoor arenas in Denmark
- List of indoor arenas in Nordic countries
