= Lithuania women's national volleyball team =

National sports team

Lithuania
- Association: Lietuvos tinklinio federacia
- Confederation: CEV
- FIVB ranking: NR (29 June 2025)

Uniforms
Home	Away

The Lithuania women's national volleyball team represents Lithuania in international women's volleyball competitions and friendly matches.

== History ==
Although volleyball was always regularly played in Lithuania, both the country's men's and women's national teams were inactive for a long period. In 2013 the Lithuania women's national volleyball team participated in the 2014 FIVB Volleyball Women's World Championship qualification (CEV) tournament, the first Lithuanian team international appearance after their extended absence.
