= Denmark women's national volleyball team =

National sports team

Denmark
- Association: Danish Volleyball Association
- Confederation: CEV
- FIVB ranking: 70 ▲10 (29 June 2025)

Uniforms
Home	Away

The Denmark women's national volleyball team ( Danish : Danske damelandsholdet volleyball ) represents Denmark in international women's volleyball competitions and friendly matches. The National team is Organized by the Danish Volleyball Association ( Danish : Dansk Volleyball Forbund : DVF ) which is a member of the Federation of International Volleyball (FIVB) as well the European Volleyball Confederation (CEV), The national federation is also a part of the North European Volleyball Zonal Association (NEVZA).

As of 2024, Amalie Jørgensen has been one of the top players.

== Results ==
=== Summer Olympics ===
Yet to qualify

=== World Championship ===
Yet to qualify

=== European Championship ===
European Championship record
Year	Round	Position	Pld	W	L	SW	SL	Squad
(Romania) 1963	1st round	13th	9	0	9	2	21	Squad
(Italy) 1971	1st round	16th	7	2	5	7	15	Squad

== Current squad ==
No.	Name	Date of Birth	Height	Position	Current Club Team
1	Tajma Muharemovic	2002-06-12	1.73 m (5 ft 8 in)	Setter	Saint Leo University USA
2	Ann-Katrine Bisgaard Håkansson	1998-03-15	1.74 m (5 ft 9 in)	Setter	Gentofte Volley DEN
3	Amalie Langbjerg Lachenmeier	1998-07-08	1.84 m (6 ft 0 in)	Middle blocker	Holte IF DEN
4	Sara Marie Vindum Hansen	1998-12-01	1.84 m (6 ft 0 in)	Middle blocker	VK Vestsjælland DEN
5	Clara Windeleff	2002-05-22	1.85 m (6 ft 1 in)	Outside spiker	Gentofte Volley DEN
6	Caroline Stenholt Krogh	2004-08-30	1.83 m (6 ft 0 in)	Setter	TBD
8	Nora Møllgaard	1997-04-10	1.79 m (5 ft 10 in)	Outside spiker	Holte IF DEN
9	Sille Slott Hansen	2002-11-25	1.80 m (5 ft 11 in)	Outside spiker	Lindved Volley DEN
10	Mette Breuning Nielsen	1996-02-18	1.87 m (6 ft 2 in)	Middle blocker	Aarhus Volley DEN
11	Emma Stevnsborg	1999-09-12	1.86 m (6 ft 1 in)	Opposite	Gentofte Volley DEN
12	Mathilde Borup Jeppesen	2000-10-02	1.82 m (6 ft 0 in)	Outside spiker	Gentofte Volley DEN
14	Ditte Kjær Hansen	1997-05-14	1.62 m (5 ft 4 in)	Libero	Ikast KFUM DEN
16	Mikala Maria Mogensen	2001-03-27	1.87 m (6 ft 2 in)	Outside spiker	TBD
17	Helena Elbæk	1998-11-03	1.86 m (6 ft 1 in)	Opposite	Aabenraa Volleyballklub DEN
18	Frederikke Stenholt Krogh	2002-07-19	1.85 m (6 ft 1 in)	Outside spiker	TBD
20	Amalie Jørgensen	2000-01-06	1.87 m (6 ft 2 in)	Middle blocker	Ikast KFUM DEN
21	Lea Føns	2003-09-22	1.68 m (5 ft 6 in)	Libero	Amager Volley DEN
22	Mathilde Rolighed Brinck Overgaard	2004-12-15	1.90 m (6 ft 3 in)	Outside spiker	TBD
