= 2026 Men's European Volleyball League league round =

Men's volleyball tournament

Tournament details
- Dates: 5–21 June
- Teams: 24 (from 1 confederation)
- Venues: 23 (in 23 host cities)

The league round of the 2026 Men's European Volleyball League took place from the 5 to 21 June to decide the four teams advacing to the final round. The preliminary round took place in 24 cities in 23 countries.

== Tournament schedule ==
Week 1
| Tournament 1 (Austria) Schwechat | Tournament 2 (Hungary) Kecskemét | Tournament 3 (North Macedonia) Strumica |
|---|---|---|
| Austria (18) (H); Finland (1); Montenegro (19) | Hungary (17) (H); Czech Republic (2); Norway (20) | North Macedonia (16) (H); Netherlands (3); Luxembourg (21) |
| Tournament 4 (Latvia) Riga | Tournament 5 (Sweden) Lund | Tournament 6 (Denmark) Odense |
| Latvia (15) (H); Romania (4); Kosovo (22) | Sweden (14) (H); Greece (5); Azerbaijan (23) | Denmark (13) (H); Portugal (6); Iceland (24) |
| Tournament 7 (Croatia) Osijek | Tournament 8 (Spain) Torrejón de Ardoz | Tournament 9 (Slovakia) Poprad |
| Croatia (12) (H); Israel (7); Georgia (25) | Spain (11) (H); Switzerland (8); Bosnia and Herzegovina (26) | Slovakia (10) (H); Estonia (9); Albania (27) |
Week 2
| Tournament 10 (Finland) Helsinki | Tournament 11 (Czech Republic) Jihlava | Tournament 12 (Netherlands) Doetinchem |
| Finland (1) (H); Croatia (12); Albania (27) | Czech Republic (2) (H); Denmark (13); Bosnia and Herzegovina (26) | Netherlands (3) (H); Slovakia (10); Georgia (25) |
| Tournament 13 (Romania) Mioveni | Tournament 14 (Greece) Agios Ioannis Renti | Tournament 15 (Portugal) Matosinhos |
| Romania (4) (H); Spain (11); Azerbaijan (23) | Greece (5) (H); North Macedonia (16); Iceland (24) | Portugal (6) (H); Latvia (15); Montenegro (19) |
| Tournament 16 (North Macedonia) Strumica (Note: Due to the Gaza war, Israel's tournament will be held at a neutral venue.) | Tournament 17 (Switzerland) Kriens | Tournament 18 (Estonia) Tallinn |
| Israel (7) (H); Sweden (14); Norway (20) | Switzerland (8) (H); Hungary (17); Luxembourg (21) | Estonia (9) (H); Austria (18); Kosovo (22) |
Week 3
| Tournament 19 (Iceland) Kópavogur | Tournament 20 (Georgia (country)) Tbilisi | Tournament 21 (Bosnia and Herzegovina) Goražde |
| Iceland (24) (H); Finland (1); Slovakia (10) | Georgia (25) (H); Czech Republic (2); Spain (11) | Bosnia and Herzegovina (26) (H); Netherlands (3); Croatia (12) |
| Tournament 22 (Albania) Tirana | Tournament 23 Luxembourg City | Tournament 24 (Azerbaijan) Baku |
| Albania (27) (H); Romania (4); Denmark (13) | Luxembourg (21) (H); Greece (5); Austria (18) | Azerbaijan (23) (H); Portugal (6); Hungary (17) |
| Tournament 25 (Kosovo) Pristina | Tournament 26 (Norway) Volda | Tournament 27 (Montenegro) Bijelo Polje |
| Kosovo (22) (H); Israel (7); North Macedonia (16) | Norway (20) (H); Switzerland (8); Latvia (15) | Montenegro (19) (H); Estonia (9); Sweden (14) |

== Matches ==
=== Week 1 ===
==== Tournament 1 ====
| 5 June 2026; 20:20 | Finland | 3–1 | Austria | Multiversum Schwechat, Schwechat; Attendance: 907 |
| 5 June 2026; 20:20 | (21–25, 25–12, 25–17, 25–16); Report | | | Multiversum Schwechat, Schwechat; Attendance: 907 |
| 5 June 2026; 20:20 | Scoring leaders | | | Multiversum Schwechat, Schwechat; Attendance: 907 |
| (0/0) | | Total | (0/0) |
| (0/0) | | Attack | (0/0) |
| (0/0) | | Block | (0/0) |
| (0/0) | | Serve | (0/0) |

| 6 June 2026; 20:20 | Montenegro | 1–3 | Finland | Multiversum Schwechat, Schwechat; Attendance: 113 |
| 6 June 2026; 20:20 | (15–25, 25–20, 18–25, 16–25); Report | | | Multiversum Schwechat, Schwechat; Attendance: 113 |
| 6 June 2026; 20:20 | Scoring leaders | | | Multiversum Schwechat, Schwechat; Attendance: 113 |
| (0/0) | | Total | (0/0) |
| (0/0) | | Attack | (0/0) |
| (0/0) | | Block | (0/0) |
| (0/0) | | Serve | (0/0) |

| 7 June 2026; 17:50 | Austria | 1–3 | Montenegro | Multiversum Schwechat, Schwechat; Attendance: 561 |
| 7 June 2026; 17:50 | (19–25, 25–20, 18–25, 20–25); Report | | | Multiversum Schwechat, Schwechat; Attendance: 561 |
| 7 June 2026; 17:50 | Scoring leaders | | | Multiversum Schwechat, Schwechat; Attendance: 561 |
| (0/0) | | Total | (0/0) |
| (0/0) | | Attack | (0/0) |
| (0/0) | | Block | (0/0) |
| (0/0) | | Serve | (0/0) |

==== Tournament 2 ====
| 5 June 2026; 17:30 | Czech Republic | 3–0 | Hungary | Messzi István Sportcsarnok, Kecskemét; Attendance: 300 |
| 5 June 2026; 17:30 | (25–12, 25–21, 25–17); Report | | | Messzi István Sportcsarnok, Kecskemét; Attendance: 300 |
| 5 June 2026; 17:30 | Scoring leaders | | | Messzi István Sportcsarnok, Kecskemét; Attendance: 300 |
| (0/0) | | Total | (0/0) |
| (0/0) | | Attack | (0/0) |
| (0/0) | | Block | (0/0) |
| (0/0) | | Serve | (0/0) |

| 6 June 2026; 17:00 | Norway | 1–3 | Czech Republic | Messzi István Sportcsarnok, Kecskemét; Attendance: 100 |
| 6 June 2026; 17:00 | (25–23, 19–25, 14–25, 18–25); Report | | | Messzi István Sportcsarnok, Kecskemét; Attendance: 100 |
| 6 June 2026; 17:00 | Scoring leaders | | | Messzi István Sportcsarnok, Kecskemét; Attendance: 100 |
| (0/0) | | Total | (0/0) |
| (0/0) | | Attack | (0/0) |
| (0/0) | | Block | (0/0) |
| (0/0) | | Serve | (0/0) |

| 7 June 2026; 17:00 | Hungary | 3–0 | Norway | Messzi István Sportcsarnok, Kecskemét; Attendance: 500 |
| 7 June 2026; 17:00 | (25–18, 25–22, 25–18); Report | | | Messzi István Sportcsarnok, Kecskemét; Attendance: 500 |
| 7 June 2026; 17:00 | Scoring leaders | | | Messzi István Sportcsarnok, Kecskemét; Attendance: 500 |
| (0/0) | | Total | (0/0) |
| (0/0) | | Attack | (0/0) |
| (0/0) | | Block | (0/0) |
| (0/0) | | Serve | (0/0) |

==== Tournament 3 ====
| 5 June 2026; 19:00 | Netherlands | 3–0 | North Macedonia | Park Sports Hall, Strumica; Attendance: 600 |
| 5 June 2026; 19:00 | (25–19, 25–21, 25–21); Report | | | Park Sports Hall, Strumica; Attendance: 600 |
| 5 June 2026; 19:00 | Scoring leaders | | | Park Sports Hall, Strumica; Attendance: 600 |
| (0/0) | | Total | (0/0) |
| (0/0) | | Attack | (0/0) |
| (0/0) | | Block | (0/0) |
| (0/0) | | Serve | (0/0) |

| 6 June 2026; 19:00 | Luxembourg | 0–3 | Netherlands | Park Sports Hall, Strumica; Attendance: 120 |
| 6 June 2026; 19:00 | (17–25, 22–25, 16–25); Report | | | Park Sports Hall, Strumica; Attendance: 120 |
| 6 June 2026; 19:00 | Scoring leaders | | | Park Sports Hall, Strumica; Attendance: 120 |
| (0/0) | | Total | (0/0) |
| (0/0) | | Attack | (0/0) |
| (0/0) | | Block | (0/0) |
| (0/0) | | Serve | (0/0) |

| 7 June 2026; 19:00 | North Macedonia | 3–1 | Luxembourg | Park Sports Hall, Strumica; Attendance: 800 |
| 7 June 2026; 19:00 | (23–25, 25–21, 25–20, 25–13); Report | | | Park Sports Hall, Strumica; Attendance: 800 |
| 7 June 2026; 19:00 | Scoring leaders | | | Park Sports Hall, Strumica; Attendance: 800 |
| (0/0) | | Total | (0/0) |
| (0/0) | | Attack | (0/0) |
| (0/0) | | Block | (0/0) |
| (0/0) | | Serve | (0/0) |

==== Tournament 4 ====
| 5 June 2026; 19:30 | Romania | 0–3 | Latvia | Komandu sporta spēļu halle, Riga; Attendance: 1,275 |
| 5 June 2026; 19:30 | (22–25, 21–25, 22–25); Report | | | Komandu sporta spēļu halle, Riga; Attendance: 1,275 |
| 5 June 2026; 19:30 | Scoring leaders | | | Komandu sporta spēļu halle, Riga; Attendance: 1,275 |
| (0/0) | | Total | (0/0) |
| (0/0) | | Attack | (0/0) |
| (0/0) | | Block | (0/0) |
| (0/0) | | Serve | (0/0) |

| 6 June 2026; 18:00 | Kosovo | 0–3 | Romania | Komandu sporta spēļu halle, Riga; Attendance: 20 |
| 6 June 2026; 18:00 | (19–25, 18–25, 14–25); Report | | | Komandu sporta spēļu halle, Riga; Attendance: 20 |
| 6 June 2026; 18:00 | Scoring leaders | | | Komandu sporta spēļu halle, Riga; Attendance: 20 |
| (0/0) | | Total | (0/0) |
| (0/0) | | Attack | (0/0) |
| (0/0) | | Block | (0/0) |
| (0/0) | | Serve | (0/0) |

| 7 June 2026; 16:30 | Latvia | 3–0 | Kosovo | Komandu sporta spēļu halle, Riga; Attendance: 1,535 |
| 7 June 2026; 16:30 | (25–12, 25–21, 25–13); Report | | | Komandu sporta spēļu halle, Riga; Attendance: 1,535 |
| 7 June 2026; 16:30 | Scoring leaders | | | Komandu sporta spēļu halle, Riga; Attendance: 1,535 |
| (0/0) | | Total | (0/0) |
| (0/0) | | Attack | (0/0) |
| (0/0) | | Block | (0/0) |
| (0/0) | | Serve | (0/0) |

==== Tournament 5 ====
| 5 June 2026; 18:00 | Greece | 2–3 | Sweden | Idrottshallen, Lund; Attendance: 568 |
| 5 June 2026; 18:00 | (25–19, 25–23, 25–27, 18–25, 13–15); Report | | | Idrottshallen, Lund; Attendance: 568 |
| 5 June 2026; 18:00 | Scoring leaders | | | Idrottshallen, Lund; Attendance: 568 |
| (0/0) | | Total | (0/0) |
| (0/0) | | Attack | (0/0) |
| (0/0) | | Block | (0/0) |
| (0/0) | | Serve | (0/0) |

| 6 June 2026; 16:00 | Azerbaijan | 0–3 | Greece | Idrottshallen, Lund; Attendance: 87 |
| 6 June 2026; 16:00 | (20–25, 22–25, 7–25); Report | | | Idrottshallen, Lund; Attendance: 87 |
| 6 June 2026; 16:00 | Scoring leaders | | | Idrottshallen, Lund; Attendance: 87 |
| (0/0) | | Total | (0/0) |
| (0/0) | | Attack | (0/0) |
| (0/0) | | Block | (0/0) |
| (0/0) | | Serve | (0/0) |

| 7 June 2026; 16:00 | Sweden | 3–0 | Azerbaijan | Idrottshallen, Lund; Attendance: 568 |
| 7 June 2026; 16:00 | (25–14, 25–17, 25–20); Report | | | Idrottshallen, Lund; Attendance: 568 |
| 7 June 2026; 16:00 | Scoring leaders | | | Idrottshallen, Lund; Attendance: 568 |
| (0/0) | | Total | (0/0) |
| (0/0) | | Attack | (0/0) |
| (0/0) | | Block | (0/0) |
| (0/0) | | Serve | (0/0) |

==== Tournament 6 ====
| 5 June 2026; 19:00 | Portugal | 1–3 | Denmark | Arena Fyn, Odense; Attendance: 512 |
| 5 June 2026; 19:00 | (17–25, 25–20, 22–25, 19–25); Report | | | Arena Fyn, Odense; Attendance: 512 |
| 5 June 2026; 19:00 | Scoring leaders | | | Arena Fyn, Odense; Attendance: 512 |
| (0/0) | | Total | (0/0) |
| (0/0) | | Attack | (0/0) |
| (0/0) | | Block | (0/0) |
| (0/0) | | Serve | (0/0) |

| 6 June 2026; 16:00 | Iceland | 0–3 | Portugal | Arena Fyn, Odense; Attendance: 46 |
| 6 June 2026; 16:00 | (19–25, 18–25, 13–25); Report | | | Arena Fyn, Odense; Attendance: 46 |
| 6 June 2026; 16:00 | Scoring leaders | | | Arena Fyn, Odense; Attendance: 46 |
| (0/0) | | Total | (0/0) |
| (0/0) | | Attack | (0/0) |
| (0/0) | | Block | (0/0) |
| (0/0) | | Serve | (0/0) |

| 7 June 2026; 16:00 | Denmark | 3–0 | Iceland | Arena Fyn, Odense; Attendance: 317 |
| 7 June 2026; 16:00 | (25–16, 25–12, 25–14); Report | | | Arena Fyn, Odense; Attendance: 317 |
| 7 June 2026; 16:00 | Scoring leaders | | | Arena Fyn, Odense; Attendance: 317 |
| (0/0) | | Total | (0/0) |
| (0/0) | | Attack | (0/0) |
| (0/0) | | Block | (0/0) |
| (0/0) | | Serve | (0/0) |

==== Tournament 7 ====
| 5 June 2026; 20:00 | Israel | 3–1 | Croatia | Gradski vrt Hall, Osijek; Attendance: 500 |
| 5 June 2026; 20:00 | (19–25, 25–20, 25–17, 25–19); Report | | | Gradski vrt Hall, Osijek; Attendance: 500 |
| 5 June 2026; 20:00 | Scoring leaders | | | Gradski vrt Hall, Osijek; Attendance: 500 |
| (0/0) | | Total | (0/0) |
| (0/0) | | Attack | (0/0) |
| (0/0) | | Block | (0/0) |
| (0/0) | | Serve | (0/0) |

| 6 June 2026; 20:00 | Georgia | 0–3 | Israel | Gradski vrt Hall, Osijek; Attendance: 35 |
| 6 June 2026; 20:00 | (14–25, 17–25, 15–25); Report | | | Gradski vrt Hall, Osijek; Attendance: 35 |
| 6 June 2026; 20:00 | Scoring leaders | | | Gradski vrt Hall, Osijek; Attendance: 35 |
| (0/0) | | Total | (0/0) |
| (0/0) | | Attack | (0/0) |
| (0/0) | | Block | (0/0) |
| (0/0) | | Serve | (0/0) |

| 7 June 2026; 20:00 | Croatia | 3–0 | Georgia | Gradski vrt Hall, Osijek; Attendance: 500 |
| 7 June 2026; 20:00 | (25–14, 25–10, 25–20); Report | | | Gradski vrt Hall, Osijek; Attendance: 500 |
| 7 June 2026; 20:00 | Scoring leaders | | | Gradski vrt Hall, Osijek; Attendance: 500 |
| (0/0) | | Total | (0/0) |
| (0/0) | | Attack | (0/0) |
| (0/0) | | Block | (0/0) |
| (0/0) | | Serve | (0/0) |

==== Tournament 8 ====
| 5 June 2026; 19:30 | Switzerland | 1–3 | Spain | Pabellón Jorge Garbajosa, Torrejón de Ardoz; Attendance: 2,100 |
| 5 June 2026; 19:30 | (25–19, 25–27, 24–26, 22–25); Report | | | Pabellón Jorge Garbajosa, Torrejón de Ardoz; Attendance: 2,100 |
| 5 June 2026; 19:30 | Scoring leaders | | | Pabellón Jorge Garbajosa, Torrejón de Ardoz; Attendance: 2,100 |
| (0/0) | | Total | (0/0) |
| (0/0) | | Attack | (0/0) |
| (0/0) | | Block | (0/0) |
| (0/0) | | Serve | (0/0) |

| 6 June 2026; 18:00 | Bosnia and Herzegovina | 0–3 | Switzerland | Pabellón Jorge Garbajosa, Torrejón de Ardoz; Attendance: 350 |
| 6 June 2026; 18:00 | (21–25, 23–25, 19–25); Report | | | Pabellón Jorge Garbajosa, Torrejón de Ardoz; Attendance: 350 |
| 6 June 2026; 18:00 | Scoring leaders | | | Pabellón Jorge Garbajosa, Torrejón de Ardoz; Attendance: 350 |
| (0/0) | | Total | (0/0) |
| (0/0) | | Attack | (0/0) |
| (0/0) | | Block | (0/0) |
| (0/0) | | Serve | (0/0) |

| 7 June 2026; 18:00 | Spain | 3–0 | Bosnia and Herzegovina | Pabellón Jorge Garbajosa, Torrejón de Ardoz; Attendance: 3,123 |
| 7 June 2026; 18:00 | (27–25, 25–19, 25–13); Report | | | Pabellón Jorge Garbajosa, Torrejón de Ardoz; Attendance: 3,123 |
| 7 June 2026; 18:00 | Scoring leaders | | | Pabellón Jorge Garbajosa, Torrejón de Ardoz; Attendance: 3,123 |
| (0/0) | | Total | (0/0) |
| (0/0) | | Attack | (0/0) |
| (0/0) | | Block | (0/0) |
| (0/0) | | Serve | (0/0) |

==== Tournament 9 ====
| 5 June 2026; 19:00 | Estonia | 3–0 | Slovakia | Aréna Poprad, Poprad; Attendance: 1,070 |
| 5 June 2026; 19:00 | (26–24, 28–26, 25–22); Report | | | Aréna Poprad, Poprad; Attendance: 1,070 |
| 5 June 2026; 19:00 | Scoring leaders | | | Aréna Poprad, Poprad; Attendance: 1,070 |
| (0/0) | | Total | (0/0) |
| (0/0) | | Attack | (0/0) |
| (0/0) | | Block | (0/0) |
| (0/0) | | Serve | (0/0) |

| 6 June 2026; 15:00 | Albania | 0–3 | Estonia | Aréna Poprad, Poprad; Attendance: 250 |
| 6 June 2026; 15:00 | (17–25, 23–25, 26–28); Report | | | Aréna Poprad, Poprad; Attendance: 250 |
| 6 June 2026; 15:00 | Scoring leaders | | | Aréna Poprad, Poprad; Attendance: 250 |
| (0/0) | | Total | (0/0) |
| (0/0) | | Attack | (0/0) |
| (0/0) | | Block | (0/0) |
| (0/0) | | Serve | (0/0) |

| 7 June 2026; 16:00 | Slovakia | 3–0 | Albania | Aréna Poprad, Poprad; Attendance: 1,250 |
| 7 June 2026; 16:00 | (25–23, 29–27, 25–15); Report | | | Aréna Poprad, Poprad; Attendance: 1,250 |
| 7 June 2026; 16:00 | Scoring leaders | | | Aréna Poprad, Poprad; Attendance: 1,250 |
| (0/0) | | Total | (0/0) |
| (0/0) | | Attack | (0/0) |
| (0/0) | | Block | (0/0) |
| (0/0) | | Serve | (0/0) |

=== Week 2 ===
==== Tournament 10 ====
| N/A | – | N/A | Ankara Arena, Ankara |
| (–, –, –, –, –) [ Report] | | | Ankara Arena, Ankara |
| Scoring leaders | | | Ankara Arena, Ankara |
| (0/0) | Total | (0/0) |
| (0/0) | Attack | (0/0) |
| (0/0) | Block | (0/0) |
| (0/0) | Serve | (0/0) |

| N/A | – | N/A | Ankara Arena, Ankara |
| (–, –, –, –, –) [ Report] | | | Ankara Arena, Ankara |
| Scoring leaders | | | Ankara Arena, Ankara |
| (0/0) | Total | (0/0) |
| (0/0) | Attack | (0/0) |
| (0/0) | Block | (0/0) |
| (0/0) | Serve | (0/0) |

| N/A | – | N/A | Ankara Arena, Ankara |
| (–, –, –, –, –) [ Report] | | | Ankara Arena, Ankara |
| Scoring leaders | | | Ankara Arena, Ankara |
| (0/0) | Total | (0/0) |
| (0/0) | Attack | (0/0) |
| (0/0) | Block | (0/0) |
| (0/0) | Serve | (0/0) |

==== Tournament 11 ====
| N/A | – | N/A | Ankara Arena, Ankara |
| (–, –, –, –, –) [ Report] | | | Ankara Arena, Ankara |
| Scoring leaders | | | Ankara Arena, Ankara |
| (0/0) | Total | (0/0) |
| (0/0) | Attack | (0/0) |
| (0/0) | Block | (0/0) |
| (0/0) | Serve | (0/0) |

| N/A | – | N/A | Ankara Arena, Ankara |
| (–, –, –, –, –) [ Report] | | | Ankara Arena, Ankara |
| Scoring leaders | | | Ankara Arena, Ankara |
| (0/0) | Total | (0/0) |
| (0/0) | Attack | (0/0) |
| (0/0) | Block | (0/0) |
| (0/0) | Serve | (0/0) |

| N/A | – | N/A | Ankara Arena, Ankara |
| (–, –, –, –, –) [ Report] | | | Ankara Arena, Ankara |
| Scoring leaders | | | Ankara Arena, Ankara |
| (0/0) | Total | (0/0) |
| (0/0) | Attack | (0/0) |
| (0/0) | Block | (0/0) |
| (0/0) | Serve | (0/0) |

==== Tournament 12 ====
| N/A | – | N/A | Ankara Arena, Ankara |
| (–, –, –, –, –) [ Report] | | | Ankara Arena, Ankara |
| Scoring leaders | | | Ankara Arena, Ankara |
| (0/0) | Total | (0/0) |
| (0/0) | Attack | (0/0) |
| (0/0) | Block | (0/0) |
| (0/0) | Serve | (0/0) |

| N/A | – | N/A | Ankara Arena, Ankara |
| (–, –, –, –, –) [ Report] | | | Ankara Arena, Ankara |
| Scoring leaders | | | Ankara Arena, Ankara |
| (0/0) | Total | (0/0) |
| (0/0) | Attack | (0/0) |
| (0/0) | Block | (0/0) |
| (0/0) | Serve | (0/0) |

| N/A | – | N/A | Ankara Arena, Ankara |
| (–, –, –, –, –) [ Report] | | | Ankara Arena, Ankara |
| Scoring leaders | | | Ankara Arena, Ankara |
| (0/0) | Total | (0/0) |
| (0/0) | Attack | (0/0) |
| (0/0) | Block | (0/0) |
| (0/0) | Serve | (0/0) |

==== Tournament 13 ====
| N/A | – | N/A | Ankara Arena, Ankara |
| (–, –, –, –, –) [ Report] | | | Ankara Arena, Ankara |
| Scoring leaders | | | Ankara Arena, Ankara |
| (0/0) | Total | (0/0) |
| (0/0) | Attack | (0/0) |
| (0/0) | Block | (0/0) |
| (0/0) | Serve | (0/0) |

| N/A | – | N/A | Ankara Arena, Ankara |
| (–, –, –, –, –) [ Report] | | | Ankara Arena, Ankara |
| Scoring leaders | | | Ankara Arena, Ankara |
| (0/0) | Total | (0/0) |
| (0/0) | Attack | (0/0) |
| (0/0) | Block | (0/0) |
| (0/0) | Serve | (0/0) |

| N/A | – | N/A | Ankara Arena, Ankara |
| (–, –, –, –, –) [ Report] | | | Ankara Arena, Ankara |
| Scoring leaders | | | Ankara Arena, Ankara |
| (0/0) | Total | (0/0) |
| (0/0) | Attack | (0/0) |
| (0/0) | Block | (0/0) |
| (0/0) | Serve | (0/0) |

==== Tournament 14 ====
| N/A | – | N/A | Ankara Arena, Ankara |
| (–, –, –, –, –) [ Report] | | | Ankara Arena, Ankara |
| Scoring leaders | | | Ankara Arena, Ankara |
| (0/0) | Total | (0/0) |
| (0/0) | Attack | (0/0) |
| (0/0) | Block | (0/0) |
| (0/0) | Serve | (0/0) |

| N/A | – | N/A | Ankara Arena, Ankara |
| (–, –, –, –, –) [ Report] | | | Ankara Arena, Ankara |
| Scoring leaders | | | Ankara Arena, Ankara |
| (0/0) | Total | (0/0) |
| (0/0) | Attack | (0/0) |
| (0/0) | Block | (0/0) |
| (0/0) | Serve | (0/0) |

| N/A | – | N/A | Ankara Arena, Ankara |
| (–, –, –, –, –) [ Report] | | | Ankara Arena, Ankara |
| Scoring leaders | | | Ankara Arena, Ankara |
| (0/0) | Total | (0/0) |
| (0/0) | Attack | (0/0) |
| (0/0) | Block | (0/0) |
| (0/0) | Serve | (0/0) |

==== Tournament 15 ====
| N/A | – | N/A | Ankara Arena, Ankara |
| (–, –, –, –, –) [ Report] | | | Ankara Arena, Ankara |
| Scoring leaders | | | Ankara Arena, Ankara |
| (0/0) | Total | (0/0) |
| (0/0) | Attack | (0/0) |
| (0/0) | Block | (0/0) |
| (0/0) | Serve | (0/0) |

| N/A | – | N/A | Ankara Arena, Ankara |
| (–, –, –, –, –) [ Report] | | | Ankara Arena, Ankara |
| Scoring leaders | | | Ankara Arena, Ankara |
| (0/0) | Total | (0/0) |
| (0/0) | Attack | (0/0) |
| (0/0) | Block | (0/0) |
| (0/0) | Serve | (0/0) |

| N/A | – | N/A | Ankara Arena, Ankara |
| (–, –, –, –, –) [ Report] | | | Ankara Arena, Ankara |
| Scoring leaders | | | Ankara Arena, Ankara |
| (0/0) | Total | (0/0) |
| (0/0) | Attack | (0/0) |
| (0/0) | Block | (0/0) |
| (0/0) | Serve | (0/0) |

==== Tournament 16 ====
| N/A | – | N/A | Ankara Arena, Ankara |
| (–, –, –, –, –) [ Report] | | | Ankara Arena, Ankara |
| Scoring leaders | | | Ankara Arena, Ankara |
| (0/0) | Total | (0/0) |
| (0/0) | Attack | (0/0) |
| (0/0) | Block | (0/0) |
| (0/0) | Serve | (0/0) |

| N/A | – | N/A | Ankara Arena, Ankara |
| (–, –, –, –, –) [ Report] | | | Ankara Arena, Ankara |
| Scoring leaders | | | Ankara Arena, Ankara |
| (0/0) | Total | (0/0) |
| (0/0) | Attack | (0/0) |
| (0/0) | Block | (0/0) |
| (0/0) | Serve | (0/0) |

| N/A | – | N/A | Ankara Arena, Ankara |
| (–, –, –, –, –) [ Report] | | | Ankara Arena, Ankara |
| Scoring leaders | | | Ankara Arena, Ankara |
| (0/0) | Total | (0/0) |
| (0/0) | Attack | (0/0) |
| (0/0) | Block | (0/0) |
| (0/0) | Serve | (0/0) |

==== Tournament 17 ====
| N/A | – | N/A | Ankara Arena, Ankara |
| (–, –, –, –, –) [ Report] | | | Ankara Arena, Ankara |
| Scoring leaders | | | Ankara Arena, Ankara |
| (0/0) | Total | (0/0) |
| (0/0) | Attack | (0/0) |
| (0/0) | Block | (0/0) |
| (0/0) | Serve | (0/0) |

| N/A | – | N/A | Ankara Arena, Ankara |
| (–, –, –, –, –) [ Report] | | | Ankara Arena, Ankara |
| Scoring leaders | | | Ankara Arena, Ankara |
| (0/0) | Total | (0/0) |
| (0/0) | Attack | (0/0) |
| (0/0) | Block | (0/0) |
| (0/0) | Serve | (0/0) |

| N/A | – | N/A | Ankara Arena, Ankara |
| (–, –, –, –, –) [ Report] | | | Ankara Arena, Ankara |
| Scoring leaders | | | Ankara Arena, Ankara |
| (0/0) | Total | (0/0) |
| (0/0) | Attack | (0/0) |
| (0/0) | Block | (0/0) |
| (0/0) | Serve | (0/0) |

==== Tournament 18 ====
| N/A | – | N/A | Ankara Arena, Ankara |
| (–, –, –, –, –) [ Report] | | | Ankara Arena, Ankara |
| Scoring leaders | | | Ankara Arena, Ankara |
| (0/0) | Total | (0/0) |
| (0/0) | Attack | (0/0) |
| (0/0) | Block | (0/0) |
| (0/0) | Serve | (0/0) |

| N/A | – | N/A | Ankara Arena, Ankara |
| (–, –, –, –, –) [ Report] | | | Ankara Arena, Ankara |
| Scoring leaders | | | Ankara Arena, Ankara |
| (0/0) | Total | (0/0) |
| (0/0) | Attack | (0/0) |
| (0/0) | Block | (0/0) |
| (0/0) | Serve | (0/0) |

| N/A | – | N/A | Ankara Arena, Ankara |
| (–, –, –, –, –) [ Report] | | | Ankara Arena, Ankara |
| Scoring leaders | | | Ankara Arena, Ankara |
| (0/0) | Total | (0/0) |
| (0/0) | Attack | (0/0) |
| (0/0) | Block | (0/0) |
| (0/0) | Serve | (0/0) |

=== Week 3 ===
==== Tournament 19 ====
| N/A | – | N/A | Ankara Arena, Ankara |
| (–, –, –, –, –) [ Report] | | | Ankara Arena, Ankara |
| Scoring leaders | | | Ankara Arena, Ankara |
| (0/0) | Total | (0/0) |
| (0/0) | Attack | (0/0) |
| (0/0) | Block | (0/0) |
| (0/0) | Serve | (0/0) |

| N/A | – | N/A | Ankara Arena, Ankara |
| (–, –, –, –, –) [ Report] | | | Ankara Arena, Ankara |
| Scoring leaders | | | Ankara Arena, Ankara |
| (0/0) | Total | (0/0) |
| (0/0) | Attack | (0/0) |
| (0/0) | Block | (0/0) |
| (0/0) | Serve | (0/0) |

| N/A | – | N/A | Ankara Arena, Ankara |
| (–, –, –, –, –) [ Report] | | | Ankara Arena, Ankara |
| Scoring leaders | | | Ankara Arena, Ankara |
| (0/0) | Total | (0/0) |
| (0/0) | Attack | (0/0) |
| (0/0) | Block | (0/0) |
| (0/0) | Serve | (0/0) |

==== Tournament 20 ====
| N/A | – | N/A | Ankara Arena, Ankara |
| (–, –, –, –, –) [ Report] | | | Ankara Arena, Ankara |
| Scoring leaders | | | Ankara Arena, Ankara |
| (0/0) | Total | (0/0) |
| (0/0) | Attack | (0/0) |
| (0/0) | Block | (0/0) |
| (0/0) | Serve | (0/0) |

| N/A | – | N/A | Ankara Arena, Ankara |
| (–, –, –, –, –) [ Report] | | | Ankara Arena, Ankara |
| Scoring leaders | | | Ankara Arena, Ankara |
| (0/0) | Total | (0/0) |
| (0/0) | Attack | (0/0) |
| (0/0) | Block | (0/0) |
| (0/0) | Serve | (0/0) |

| N/A | – | N/A | Ankara Arena, Ankara |
| (–, –, –, –, –) [ Report] | | | Ankara Arena, Ankara |
| Scoring leaders | | | Ankara Arena, Ankara |
| (0/0) | Total | (0/0) |
| (0/0) | Attack | (0/0) |
| (0/0) | Block | (0/0) |
| (0/0) | Serve | (0/0) |

==== Tournament 21 ====
| N/A | – | N/A | Ankara Arena, Ankara |
| (–, –, –, –, –) [ Report] | | | Ankara Arena, Ankara |
| Scoring leaders | | | Ankara Arena, Ankara |
| (0/0) | Total | (0/0) |
| (0/0) | Attack | (0/0) |
| (0/0) | Block | (0/0) |
| (0/0) | Serve | (0/0) |

| N/A | – | N/A | Ankara Arena, Ankara |
| (–, –, –, –, –) [ Report] | | | Ankara Arena, Ankara |
| Scoring leaders | | | Ankara Arena, Ankara |
| (0/0) | Total | (0/0) |
| (0/0) | Attack | (0/0) |
| (0/0) | Block | (0/0) |
| (0/0) | Serve | (0/0) |

| N/A | – | N/A | Ankara Arena, Ankara |
| (–, –, –, –, –) [ Report] | | | Ankara Arena, Ankara |
| Scoring leaders | | | Ankara Arena, Ankara |
| (0/0) | Total | (0/0) |
| (0/0) | Attack | (0/0) |
| (0/0) | Block | (0/0) |
| (0/0) | Serve | (0/0) |

==== Tournament 22 ====
| N/A | – | N/A | Ankara Arena, Ankara |
| (–, –, –, –, –) [ Report] | | | Ankara Arena, Ankara |
| Scoring leaders | | | Ankara Arena, Ankara |
| (0/0) | Total | (0/0) |
| (0/0) | Attack | (0/0) |
| (0/0) | Block | (0/0) |
| (0/0) | Serve | (0/0) |

| N/A | – | N/A | Ankara Arena, Ankara |
| (–, –, –, –, –) [ Report] | | | Ankara Arena, Ankara |
| Scoring leaders | | | Ankara Arena, Ankara |
| (0/0) | Total | (0/0) |
| (0/0) | Attack | (0/0) |
| (0/0) | Block | (0/0) |
| (0/0) | Serve | (0/0) |

| N/A | – | N/A | Ankara Arena, Ankara |
| (–, –, –, –, –) [ Report] | | | Ankara Arena, Ankara |
| Scoring leaders | | | Ankara Arena, Ankara |
| (0/0) | Total | (0/0) |
| (0/0) | Attack | (0/0) |
| (0/0) | Block | (0/0) |
| (0/0) | Serve | (0/0) |

==== Tournament 23 ====
| N/A | – | N/A | Ankara Arena, Ankara |
| (–, –, –, –, –) [ Report] | | | Ankara Arena, Ankara |
| Scoring leaders | | | Ankara Arena, Ankara |
| (0/0) | Total | (0/0) |
| (0/0) | Attack | (0/0) |
| (0/0) | Block | (0/0) |
| (0/0) | Serve | (0/0) |

| N/A | – | N/A | Ankara Arena, Ankara |
| (–, –, –, –, –) [ Report] | | | Ankara Arena, Ankara |
| Scoring leaders | | | Ankara Arena, Ankara |
| (0/0) | Total | (0/0) |
| (0/0) | Attack | (0/0) |
| (0/0) | Block | (0/0) |
| (0/0) | Serve | (0/0) |

| N/A | – | N/A | Ankara Arena, Ankara |
| (–, –, –, –, –) [ Report] | | | Ankara Arena, Ankara |
| Scoring leaders | | | Ankara Arena, Ankara |
| (0/0) | Total | (0/0) |
| (0/0) | Attack | (0/0) |
| (0/0) | Block | (0/0) |
| (0/0) | Serve | (0/0) |

==== Tournament 24 ====
| N/A | – | N/A | Ankara Arena, Ankara |
| (–, –, –, –, –) [ Report] | | | Ankara Arena, Ankara |
| Scoring leaders | | | Ankara Arena, Ankara |
| (0/0) | Total | (0/0) |
| (0/0) | Attack | (0/0) |
| (0/0) | Block | (0/0) |
| (0/0) | Serve | (0/0) |

| N/A | – | N/A | Ankara Arena, Ankara |
| (–, –, –, –, –) [ Report] | | | Ankara Arena, Ankara |
| Scoring leaders | | | Ankara Arena, Ankara |
| (0/0) | Total | (0/0) |
| (0/0) | Attack | (0/0) |
| (0/0) | Block | (0/0) |
| (0/0) | Serve | (0/0) |

| N/A | – | N/A | Ankara Arena, Ankara |
| (–, –, –, –, –) [ Report] | | | Ankara Arena, Ankara |
| Scoring leaders | | | Ankara Arena, Ankara |
| (0/0) | Total | (0/0) |
| (0/0) | Attack | (0/0) |
| (0/0) | Block | (0/0) |
| (0/0) | Serve | (0/0) |

==== Tournament 25 ====
| N/A | – | N/A | Ankara Arena, Ankara |
| (–, –, –, –, –) [ Report] | | | Ankara Arena, Ankara |
| Scoring leaders | | | Ankara Arena, Ankara |
| (0/0) | Total | (0/0) |
| (0/0) | Attack | (0/0) |
| (0/0) | Block | (0/0) |
| (0/0) | Serve | (0/0) |

| N/A | – | N/A | Ankara Arena, Ankara |
| (–, –, –, –, –) [ Report] | | | Ankara Arena, Ankara |
| Scoring leaders | | | Ankara Arena, Ankara |
| (0/0) | Total | (0/0) |
| (0/0) | Attack | (0/0) |
| (0/0) | Block | (0/0) |
| (0/0) | Serve | (0/0) |

| N/A | – | N/A | Ankara Arena, Ankara |
| (–, –, –, –, –) [ Report] | | | Ankara Arena, Ankara |
| Scoring leaders | | | Ankara Arena, Ankara |
| (0/0) | Total | (0/0) |
| (0/0) | Attack | (0/0) |
| (0/0) | Block | (0/0) |
| (0/0) | Serve | (0/0) |

==== Tournament 26 ====
| N/A | – | N/A | Ankara Arena, Ankara |
| (–, –, –, –, –) [ Report] | | | Ankara Arena, Ankara |
| Scoring leaders | | | Ankara Arena, Ankara |
| (0/0) | Total | (0/0) |
| (0/0) | Attack | (0/0) |
| (0/0) | Block | (0/0) |
| (0/0) | Serve | (0/0) |

| N/A | – | N/A | Ankara Arena, Ankara |
| (–, –, –, –, –) [ Report] | | | Ankara Arena, Ankara |
| Scoring leaders | | | Ankara Arena, Ankara |
| (0/0) | Total | (0/0) |
| (0/0) | Attack | (0/0) |
| (0/0) | Block | (0/0) |
| (0/0) | Serve | (0/0) |

| N/A | – | N/A | Ankara Arena, Ankara |
| (–, –, –, –, –) [ Report] | | | Ankara Arena, Ankara |
| Scoring leaders | | | Ankara Arena, Ankara |
| (0/0) | Total | (0/0) |
| (0/0) | Attack | (0/0) |
| (0/0) | Block | (0/0) |
| (0/0) | Serve | (0/0) |

==== Tournament 27 ====
| N/A | – | N/A | Ankara Arena, Ankara |
| (–, –, –, –, –) [ Report] | | | Ankara Arena, Ankara |
| Scoring leaders | | | Ankara Arena, Ankara |
| (0/0) | Total | (0/0) |
| (0/0) | Attack | (0/0) |
| (0/0) | Block | (0/0) |
| (0/0) | Serve | (0/0) |

| N/A | – | N/A | Ankara Arena, Ankara |
| (–, –, –, –, –) [ Report] | | | Ankara Arena, Ankara |
| Scoring leaders | | | Ankara Arena, Ankara |
| (0/0) | Total | (0/0) |
| (0/0) | Attack | (0/0) |
| (0/0) | Block | (0/0) |
| (0/0) | Serve | (0/0) |

| N/A | – | N/A | Ankara Arena, Ankara |
| (–, –, –, –, –) [ Report] | | | Ankara Arena, Ankara |
| Scoring leaders | | | Ankara Arena, Ankara |
| (0/0) | Total | (0/0) |
| (0/0) | Attack | (0/0) |
| (0/0) | Block | (0/0) |
| (0/0) | Serve | (0/0) |

== See also ==
- 2026 Women's European Volleyball League league round
- 2026 Women's European Volleyball Championship
- 2026 AVC Women's Volleyball Cup
