= 2026 Women's European Volleyball League league round =

Women's volleyball tournament

Tournament details
- Dates: 5–21 June
- Teams: 24 (from 1 confederation)
- Venues: 24 (in 24 host cities)

The league round of the 2026 Women's European Volleyball League took place from the 5 to 21 June to decide the four teams advancing to the final round. The preliminary round took place in 24 cities in 23 countries.

== Tournament schedule ==
Week 1
Tournament 1 (Latvia) Riga	Tournament 2 (Azerbaijan) Baku	Tournament 3 (Montenegro) Bar	Tournament 4 (Bosnia and Herzegovina) Goražde
Latvia (16) (H); Romania (1); Israel (17)	Azerbaijan (15) (H); Sweden (2); Estonia (18)	Montenegro (14) (H); Slovenia (3); Georgia (19)	Bosnia and Herzegovina (13) (H); Spain (4); Kosovo (20)
Tournament 5 (Portugal) Vila do Conde	Tournament 6 (Austria) Schwechat	Tournament 7 (Croatia) Osijek	Tournament 8 (Finland) Nokia
Portugal (12) (H); Hungary (5); North Macedonia (21)	Austria (11) (H); Slovakia (6); Iceland (22)	Croatia (10) (H); Greece (7); Lithuania (Note: Preliminary round winners) (23)	Finland (9) (H); Switzerland (8); Albania (Note: Preliminary round runners-up) (24)
Week 2
Tournament 9 (Romania) Blaj	Tournament 10 (Sweden) Ängelholm	Tournament 11 (Slovenia) Ljubljana	Tournament 12 (Spain) Alicante
Romania (1) (H); Montenegro (14); Albania (24)	Sweden (2) (H); Bosnia and Herzegovina (13); Lithuania (23)	Slovenia (3) (H); Latvia (16); Iceland (22)	Spain (4) (H); Azerbaijan (15); North Macedonia (21)
Tournament 13 (Hungary) Kecskemét	Tournament 14 (Slovakia) Poprad	Tournament 15 (Greece) Larissa	Tournament 16 (Switzerland) Kriens
Hungary (5) (H); Croatia (10); Estonia (18)	Slovakia (6) (H); Finland (9); Israel (17)	Greece (7) (H); Portugal (12); Kosovo (20)	Switzerland (8) (H); Austria (11); Georgia (19)
Week 3
Tournament 17 (Lithuania) Šiauliai	Tournament 18 (Albania) Tirana	Tournament 19 (North Macedonia) Skopje	Tournament 20 (Iceland) Kópavogur
Lithuania (23) (H); Romania (1); Portugal (12)	Albania (24) (H); Sweden (2); Austria (11)	North Macedonia (21) (H); Slovenia (3); Croatia (10)	Iceland (22) (H); Spain (4); Finland (9)
Tournament 21 (Kosovo) Pristina	Tournament 22 (Georgia (country)) Tbilisi	Tournament 23 (Estonia) Tallinn	Tournament 24 (North Macedonia) Strumica (Note: Due to the Gaza war, Israel's tournament will be held at a neutral venue.)
Kosovo (20) (H); Hungary (5); Montenegro (14)	Georgia (19) (H); Slovakia (6); Bosnia and Herzegovina (13)	Estonia (18) (H); Greece (7); Latvia (16)	Israel (17) (H); Switzerland (8); Azerbaijan (15)

== Matches ==
=== Week 1 ===
==== Tournament 1 ====
5 June 2026; 16:30	Romania	3–2	Latvia	Komandu sporta spēļu halle, Riga; Attendance: 1,100; Referees: Sergej Rodin , Salvis Kurtiss
5 June 2026; 16:30	(23–25, 20–25, 25–18, 25–20, 16–14); Report			Komandu sporta spēļu halle, Riga; Attendance: 1,100; Referees: Sergej Rodin , Salvis Kurtiss
5 June 2026; 16:30	Scoring leaders			Komandu sporta spēļu halle, Riga; Attendance: 1,100; Referees: Sergej Rodin , Salvis Kurtiss
Budăi-Ungureanu 27		Total	Levinska 20
Budăi-Ungureanu (25/53)		Attack	Levinska (20/52)
Axinte 4		Block	Rīta 5
Ariton (1/16)		Serve	Struka (3/19)

6 June 2026; 15:00	Israel	0–3	Romania	Komandu sporta spēļu halle, Riga; Attendance: 22; Referees: Bartlomiej Adamczyk , Risto Strandson
6 June 2026; 15:00	(18–25, 23–25, 23–25); Report			Komandu sporta spēļu halle, Riga; Attendance: 22; Referees: Bartlomiej Adamczyk , Risto Strandson
6 June 2026; 15:00	Scoring leaders			Komandu sporta spēļu halle, Riga; Attendance: 22; Referees: Bartlomiej Adamczyk , Risto Strandson
Gamanovich 17		Total	Budăi-Ungureanu, Zadorojnai 16
Gamanovich (15/32)		Attack	Zadorojnai (14/26)
Mitzov 2		Block	Ionescu 3
Cohen, Gamanovich (2/11)		Serve	Budăi-Ungureanu (3/20)

7 June 2026; 19:30	Latvia	0–3	Israel	Komandu sporta spēļu halle, Riga; Attendance: 1,195; Referees: Risto Strandson , Sergej Rodin
7 June 2026; 19:30	(21–25, 22–25, 23–25); Report			Komandu sporta spēļu halle, Riga; Attendance: 1,195; Referees: Risto Strandson , Sergej Rodin
7 June 2026; 19:30	Scoring leaders			Komandu sporta spēļu halle, Riga; Attendance: 1,195; Referees: Risto Strandson , Sergej Rodin
Levinska 21		Total	Gamanovich 22
Levinska (17/44)		Attack	Gamanovich (17/38)
Levinska 4		Block	Gamanovich 3
Jurdža (2/10)		Serve	Kopolovich (2/19)

==== Tournament 2 ====
5 June 2026; 18:00	Sweden	3–0	Azerbaijan	A.Y.S. Sport Hall, Baku; Attendance: 1,100; Referees: Atanas Varbanov , Mikheil Guniava
5 June 2026; 18:00	(25–19, 25–14, 25–23); Report			A.Y.S. Sport Hall, Baku; Attendance: 1,100; Referees: Atanas Varbanov , Mikheil Guniava
5 June 2026; 18:00	Scoring leaders			A.Y.S. Sport Hall, Baku; Attendance: 1,100; Referees: Atanas Varbanov , Mikheil Guniava
I. Haak 28		Total	Ruban 20
I. Haak (25/43)		Attack	Ruban (19/45)
A. Haak 4		Block	Kirilyuk 2
Hellvig (2/9)		Serve	Ruban (1/8)

6 June 2026; 18:00	Estonia	0–3	Sweden	A.Y.S. Sport Hall, Baku; Attendance: 50; Referees: Fuad Aghayev , Atanas Varbanov
6 June 2026; 18:00	(18–25, 25–27, 21–25); Report			A.Y.S. Sport Hall, Baku; Attendance: 50; Referees: Fuad Aghayev , Atanas Varbanov
6 June 2026; 18:00	Scoring leaders			A.Y.S. Sport Hall, Baku; Attendance: 50; Referees: Fuad Aghayev , Atanas Varbanov
Pertens 13		Total	I. Haak 27
Pertens (13/34)		Attack	I. Haak (24/42)
Sova 2		Block	three players 2
Vares (1/6)		Serve	A. Haak (2/19)

7 June 2026; 18:00	Azerbaijan	3–0	Estonia	A.Y.S. Sport Hall, Baku; Attendance: 1,167; Referees: Mikheil Guniava , Fuad Aghayev
7 June 2026; 18:00	(25–15, 25–14, 25–20); Report			A.Y.S. Sport Hall, Baku; Attendance: 1,167; Referees: Mikheil Guniava , Fuad Aghayev
7 June 2026; 18:00	Scoring leaders			A.Y.S. Sport Hall, Baku; Attendance: 1,167; Referees: Mikheil Guniava , Fuad Aghayev
Ruban 14		Total	Laak 12
Ruban (11/32)		Attack	Laak (12/37)
Stepanenko 3		Block	Kibbermann, Vares 2
Besman (2/12)		Serve	Vares (1/7)

==== Tournament 3 ====
5 June 2026; 19:00	Slovenia	3–0	Montenegro	Topolica Sport Hall, Bar; Attendance: 296; Referees: Peter Szabo , Stefano Nava
5 June 2026; 19:00	(25–18, 25–17, 25–22); Report			Topolica Sport Hall, Bar; Attendance: 296; Referees: Peter Szabo , Stefano Nava
5 June 2026; 19:00	Scoring leaders			Topolica Sport Hall, Bar; Attendance: 296; Referees: Peter Szabo , Stefano Nava
Sillah 17		Total	Perović 14
Sillah (15/28)		Attack	Perović (14/33)
Sillah 2		Block	Đurović 3
Pavlović Mori (3/14)		Serve	Čavić (1/11)

6 June 2026; 17:00	Georgia	0–3	Slovenia	Topolica Sport Hall, Bar; Attendance: 71; Referees: Jelena Mitrovic , Peter Szabo
6 June 2026; 17:00	(16–25, 10–25, 24–26); Report			Topolica Sport Hall, Bar; Attendance: 71; Referees: Jelena Mitrovic , Peter Szabo
6 June 2026; 17:00	Scoring leaders			Topolica Sport Hall, Bar; Attendance: 71; Referees: Jelena Mitrovic , Peter Szabo
Tevdoradze 13		Total	Šiftar 13
Tevdoradze (11/31)		Attack	Sillah (11/18)
Lobzhanidze, Tevdoradze 2		Block	four players 2
Kobaidze (2/15)		Serve	Milošič (1/10)

7 June 2026; 19:00	Montenegro	3–1	Georgia	Topolica Sport Hall, Bar; Attendance: 342; Referees: Stefano Nava , Jelena Mitrovic
7 June 2026; 19:00	(25–21, 17–25, 25–14, 25–13); Report			Topolica Sport Hall, Bar; Attendance: 342; Referees: Stefano Nava , Jelena Mitrovic
7 June 2026; 19:00	Scoring leaders			Topolica Sport Hall, Bar; Attendance: 342; Referees: Stefano Nava , Jelena Mitrovic
Perović 17		Total	Kobaidze 14
Perović (16/38)		Attack	Kobaidze (13/30)
Đurović, Jovanović 2		Block	three players 1
Dragović (3/21)		Serve	Lobzhanidze (2/12)

==== Tournament 4 ====
5 June 2026; 17:00	Spain	3–0	Bosnia and Herzegovina	Mirsad Hurić Hall, Goražde; Attendance: 850; Referees: Mahmoud Alburdeini , George Gradinaru
5 June 2026; 17:00	(25–17, 25–21, 28–26); Report			Mirsad Hurić Hall, Goražde; Attendance: 850; Referees: Mahmoud Alburdeini , George Gradinaru
5 June 2026; 17:00	Scoring leaders			Mirsad Hurić Hall, Goražde; Attendance: 850; Referees: Mahmoud Alburdeini , George Gradinaru
Fernández 19		Total	Isanović 13
Fernández (15/32)		Attack	Isanović (11/37)
Lázaro 2		Block	Đukić 3
Fernández (3/14)		Serve	Isanović (1/15)

6 June 2026; 17:00	Kosovo	1–3	Spain	Mirsad Hurić Hall, Goražde; Attendance: 310; Referees: Sinisa Ovuka , Mahmoud Alburdeini
6 June 2026; 17:00	(9–25, 18–25, 25–20, 17–25); Report			Mirsad Hurić Hall, Goražde; Attendance: 310; Referees: Sinisa Ovuka , Mahmoud Alburdeini
6 June 2026; 17:00	Scoring leaders			Mirsad Hurić Hall, Goražde; Attendance: 310; Referees: Sinisa Ovuka , Mahmoud Alburdeini
Sylejmani 10		Total	Varela Gomez 14
Avdyli (8/20)		Attack	Varela Gomez (10/12)
Neziri 2		Block	Lázaro 2
Neziri (1/14)		Serve	Varela Gomez (3/15)

7 June 2026; 17:00	Bosnia and Herzegovina	3–0	Kosovo	Mirsad Hurić Hall, Goražde; Attendance: 780; Referees: George Gradinaru , Sinisa Ovuka
7 June 2026; 17:00	(25–18, 25–22, 25–23); Report			Mirsad Hurić Hall, Goražde; Attendance: 780; Referees: George Gradinaru , Sinisa Ovuka
7 June 2026; 17:00	Scoring leaders			Mirsad Hurić Hall, Goražde; Attendance: 780; Referees: George Gradinaru , Sinisa Ovuka
Isanović 24		Total	Sylejmani 10
Isanović (24/46)		Attack	Sylejmani (8/31)
Biberdžić 3		Block	Kadriu 3
		Serve	Avdyli (2/14)

==== Tournament 5 ====
5 June 2026; 21:00	Hungary	3–0	Portugal	Pavilhão de Desportos de Vila do Conde, Vila do Conde; Attendance: 1,850; Referees: Ruben Sanchez Rodriguez , Giordano Vinicius Dos Santos
5 June 2026; 21:00	(25–22, 25–20, 25–23); Report			Pavilhão de Desportos de Vila do Conde, Vila do Conde; Attendance: 1,850; Referees: Ruben Sanchez Rodriguez , Giordano Vinicius Dos Santos
5 June 2026; 21:00	Scoring leaders			Pavilhão de Desportos de Vila do Conde, Vila do Conde; Attendance: 1,850; Referees: Ruben Sanchez Rodriguez , Giordano Vinicius Dos Santos
Németh 26		Total	Cavalcanti, Monteiro 10
Németh (21/53)		Attack	Kavalenka, Monteiro (7/26)
Kump, Németh 4		Block	Cavalcanti 4
Bozóki-Szedmák (1/15)		Serve	Monteiro (1/12)

6 June 2026; 17:00	North Macedonia	0–3	Hungary	Pavilhão de Desportos de Vila do Conde, Vila do Conde; Attendance: 93; Referees: Ricardo Ferreira , Ruben Sanchez Rodriguez
6 June 2026; 17:00	(14–25, 21–25, 11–25); Report			Pavilhão de Desportos de Vila do Conde, Vila do Conde; Attendance: 93; Referees: Ricardo Ferreira , Ruben Sanchez Rodriguez
6 June 2026; 17:00	Scoring leaders			Pavilhão de Desportos de Vila do Conde, Vila do Conde; Attendance: 93; Referees: Ricardo Ferreira , Ruben Sanchez Rodriguez
Milevska 9		Total	Németh 22
Milevska (8/26)		Attack	Németh (20/38)
Stojkoska 2		Block	three players 3
Stojkoska (1/6)		Serve	Kump (2/15)

7 June 2026; 16:30	Portugal	3–0	North Macedonia	Pavilhão de Desportos de Vila do Conde, Vila do Conde; Attendance: 1,860; Referees: Giordano Vinicius Dos Santos , Ricardo Ferreira
7 June 2026; 16:30	(25–16, 25–16, 25–11); Report			Pavilhão de Desportos de Vila do Conde, Vila do Conde; Attendance: 1,860; Referees: Giordano Vinicius Dos Santos , Ricardo Ferreira
7 June 2026; 16:30	Scoring leaders			Pavilhão de Desportos de Vila do Conde, Vila do Conde; Attendance: 1,860; Referees: Giordano Vinicius Dos Santos , Ricardo Ferreira
Garcez 14		Total	Kovachevikj, Terzievska 5
Garcez (8/13)		Attack	Terzievska (5/23)
Cavalcanti 6		Block	Jonuzi, Kovachevikj 1
Garcez (4/10)		Serve

==== Tournament 6 ====
5 June 2026; 17:35	Slovakia	3–0	Austria	Multiversum Schwechat, Schwechat; Attendance: 786; Referees: Oana Cristina Fortu , Bosko Milić
5 June 2026; 17:35	(25–22, 25–20, 25–15); Report			Multiversum Schwechat, Schwechat; Attendance: 786; Referees: Oana Cristina Fortu , Bosko Milić
5 June 2026; 17:35	Scoring leaders			Multiversum Schwechat, Schwechat; Attendance: 786; Referees: Oana Cristina Fortu , Bosko Milić
Šunderlíková 29		Total	Galić 14
Šunderlíková (25/43)		Attack	Galić (12/28)
Hrušecká 4		Block	Nesimović 3
Fričová (2/15)		Serve	Nesimović (1/9)

6 June 2026; 17:35	Iceland	0–3	Slovakia	Multiversum Schwechat, Schwechat; Attendance: 127; Referees: François Troyon , Wim Cambré
6 June 2026; 17:35	(10–25, 15–25, 19–25); Report			Multiversum Schwechat, Schwechat; Attendance: 127; Referees: François Troyon , Wim Cambré
6 June 2026; 17:35	Scoring leaders			Multiversum Schwechat, Schwechat; Attendance: 127; Referees: François Troyon , Wim Cambré
Hadziredzepovic 11		Total	Herdová 18
Hadziredzepovic (9/28)		Attack	Herdová (15/32)
Heimisdóttir 3		Block	Körmendyová, Šunderlíková 2
Einarsdóttir (1/11)		Serve	Kohútová (4/13)

7 June 2026; 15:05	Austria	3–0	Iceland	Multiversum Schwechat, Schwechat; Attendance: 435; Referees: François Troyon , Bosko Milić
7 June 2026; 15:05	(25–15, 25–13, 25–23); Report			Multiversum Schwechat, Schwechat; Attendance: 435; Referees: François Troyon , Bosko Milić
7 June 2026; 15:05	Scoring leaders			Multiversum Schwechat, Schwechat; Attendance: 435; Referees: François Troyon , Bosko Milić
Galić, Schaberl 15		Total	Hadziredzepovic 11
Galić (15/27)		Attack	Hadziredzepovic (10/34)
Nesimović 4		Block	Heimisdóttir 3
Brückner (1/13)		Serve	Stefánsdóttir (2/11)

==== Tournament 7 ====
5 June 2026; 17:00	Greece	3–1	Croatia	Gradski vrt Hall, Osijek; Attendance: 600; Referees: Mathilde Hayaux du Tilly , Toni Ivkovic
5 June 2026; 17:00	(25–27, 25–13, 25–19, 25–23); Report			Gradski vrt Hall, Osijek; Attendance: 600; Referees: Mathilde Hayaux du Tilly , Toni Ivkovic
5 June 2026; 17:00	Scoring leaders			Gradski vrt Hall, Osijek; Attendance: 600; Referees: Mathilde Hayaux du Tilly , Toni Ivkovic
Anthouli 29		Total	Fabris 23
Anthouli (25/45)		Attack	Fabris (18/36)
Papageorgiou 4		Block	Butigan, Fabris 4
Anthouli (3/22)		Serve	Burilović (2/9)

6 June 2026; 17:00	Lithuania	0–3	Greece	Gradski vrt Hall, Osijek; Attendance: 150; Referees: Zdravko Jakisa , Stefano Cesare
6 June 2026; 17:00	(25–27, 15–25, 10–25); Report			Gradski vrt Hall, Osijek; Attendance: 150; Referees: Zdravko Jakisa , Stefano Cesare
6 June 2026; 17:00	Scoring leaders			Gradski vrt Hall, Osijek; Attendance: 150; Referees: Zdravko Jakisa , Stefano Cesare
Šalkutė 11		Total	Anthouli, Chatziefstratiadou 16
Paukštytė (9/24)		Attack	Anthouli (16/27)
Šalkutė, Staniulytė 2		Block	Chatziefstratiadou 6
Šalkutė (2/8)		Serve	Tani (2/11)

7 June 2026; 17:00	Croatia	3–0	Lithuania	Gradski vrt Hall, Osijek; Attendance: 400; Referees: Zdravko Jakisa , Toni Ivkovic
7 June 2026; 17:00	(25–23, 25–22, 25–21); Report			Gradski vrt Hall, Osijek; Attendance: 400; Referees: Zdravko Jakisa , Toni Ivkovic
7 June 2026; 17:00	Scoring leaders			Gradski vrt Hall, Osijek; Attendance: 400; Referees: Zdravko Jakisa , Toni Ivkovic
Bečić, Burilović 12		Total	Paukštytė 14
Bečić, Burilović (11/28)		Attack	Paukštytė (13/28)
Butigan 4		Block	Rakauskaitė 6
Butigan (2/10)		Serve	Šalkutė (2/19)

==== Tournament 8 ====
5 June 2026; 18:00	Switzerland	2–3	Finland	AGCO Power Arena, Nokia; Attendance: 826; Referees: Marie-Catherine Boulanger , Jón Olafur Valdimarsson
5 June 2026; 18:00	(25–20, 24–26, 19–25, 25–23, 16–18); Report			AGCO Power Arena, Nokia; Attendance: 826; Referees: Marie-Catherine Boulanger , Jón Olafur Valdimarsson
5 June 2026; 18:00	Scoring leaders			AGCO Power Arena, Nokia; Attendance: 826; Referees: Marie-Catherine Boulanger , Jón Olafur Valdimarsson
Lengweiler 32		Total	Aronen 24
Lengweiler (32/86)		Attack	Aronen (22/44)
Pierret, Wieland 4		Block	Peltomaa 5
Wieland (1/21)		Serve	Alanko (2/23)

6 June 2026; 16:00	Albania	0–3	Switzerland	AGCO Power Arena, Nokia; Attendance: 124; Referees: Janne Mäntylä , Marie-Catherine Boulanger
6 June 2026; 16:00	(14–25, 20–25, 18–25); Report			AGCO Power Arena, Nokia; Attendance: 124; Referees: Janne Mäntylä , Marie-Catherine Boulanger
6 June 2026; 16:00	Scoring leaders			AGCO Power Arena, Nokia; Attendance: 124; Referees: Janne Mäntylä , Marie-Catherine Boulanger
Gjata, Kodra 9		Total	Lengweiler 11
Kodra (8/25)		Attack	Lengweiler (9/14)
Malaj 5		Block	Branca 3
Gjata (2/13)		Serve	Branca (2/8)

7 June 2026; 16:00	Finland	3–0	Albania	AGCO Power Arena, Nokia; Attendance: 682; Referees: Jón Olafur Valdimarsson , Janne Mäntylä
7 June 2026; 16:00	(25–8, 25–19, 25–16); Report			AGCO Power Arena, Nokia; Attendance: 682; Referees: Jón Olafur Valdimarsson , Janne Mäntylä
7 June 2026; 16:00	Scoring leaders			AGCO Power Arena, Nokia; Attendance: 682; Referees: Jón Olafur Valdimarsson , Janne Mäntylä
Peltomaa 13		Total	Malaj 9
Aronen (11/21)		Attack	Sulejmani (5/14)
Peltomaa 5		Block	Malaj 3
Peltomaa (5/18)		Serve	Malaj (3/11)

=== Week 2 ===
==== Tournament 9 ====
N/A	–	N/A	Ankara Arena, Ankara
(–, –, –, –, –) [ Report]			Ankara Arena, Ankara
Scoring leaders			Ankara Arena, Ankara
(0/0)	Total	(0/0)
(0/0)	Attack	(0/0)
(0/0)	Block	(0/0)
(0/0)	Serve	(0/0)

N/A	–	N/A	Ankara Arena, Ankara
(–, –, –, –, –) [ Report]			Ankara Arena, Ankara
Scoring leaders			Ankara Arena, Ankara
(0/0)	Total	(0/0)
(0/0)	Attack	(0/0)
(0/0)	Block	(0/0)
(0/0)	Serve	(0/0)

N/A	–	N/A	Ankara Arena, Ankara
(–, –, –, –, –) [ Report]			Ankara Arena, Ankara
Scoring leaders			Ankara Arena, Ankara
(0/0)	Total	(0/0)
(0/0)	Attack	(0/0)
(0/0)	Block	(0/0)
(0/0)	Serve	(0/0)

==== Tournament 10 ====
N/A	–	N/A	Ankara Arena, Ankara
(–, –, –, –, –) [ Report]			Ankara Arena, Ankara
Scoring leaders			Ankara Arena, Ankara
(0/0)	Total	(0/0)
(0/0)	Attack	(0/0)
(0/0)	Block	(0/0)
(0/0)	Serve	(0/0)

N/A	–	N/A	Ankara Arena, Ankara
(–, –, –, –, –) [ Report]			Ankara Arena, Ankara
Scoring leaders			Ankara Arena, Ankara
(0/0)	Total	(0/0)
(0/0)	Attack	(0/0)
(0/0)	Block	(0/0)
(0/0)	Serve	(0/0)

N/A	–	N/A	Ankara Arena, Ankara
(–, –, –, –, –) [ Report]			Ankara Arena, Ankara
Scoring leaders			Ankara Arena, Ankara
(0/0)	Total	(0/0)
(0/0)	Attack	(0/0)
(0/0)	Block	(0/0)
(0/0)	Serve	(0/0)

==== Tournament 11 ====
N/A	–	N/A	Ankara Arena, Ankara
(–, –, –, –, –) [ Report]			Ankara Arena, Ankara
Scoring leaders			Ankara Arena, Ankara
(0/0)	Total	(0/0)
(0/0)	Attack	(0/0)
(0/0)	Block	(0/0)
(0/0)	Serve	(0/0)

N/A	–	N/A	Ankara Arena, Ankara
(–, –, –, –, –) [ Report]			Ankara Arena, Ankara
Scoring leaders			Ankara Arena, Ankara
(0/0)	Total	(0/0)
(0/0)	Attack	(0/0)
(0/0)	Block	(0/0)
(0/0)	Serve	(0/0)

N/A	–	N/A	Ankara Arena, Ankara
(–, –, –, –, –) [ Report]			Ankara Arena, Ankara
Scoring leaders			Ankara Arena, Ankara
(0/0)	Total	(0/0)
(0/0)	Attack	(0/0)
(0/0)	Block	(0/0)
(0/0)	Serve	(0/0)

==== Tournament 12 ====
N/A	–	N/A	Ankara Arena, Ankara
(–, –, –, –, –) [ Report]			Ankara Arena, Ankara
Scoring leaders			Ankara Arena, Ankara
(0/0)	Total	(0/0)
(0/0)	Attack	(0/0)
(0/0)	Block	(0/0)
(0/0)	Serve	(0/0)

N/A	–	N/A	Ankara Arena, Ankara
(–, –, –, –, –) [ Report]			Ankara Arena, Ankara
Scoring leaders			Ankara Arena, Ankara
(0/0)	Total	(0/0)
(0/0)	Attack	(0/0)
(0/0)	Block	(0/0)
(0/0)	Serve	(0/0)

N/A	–	N/A	Ankara Arena, Ankara
(–, –, –, –, –) [ Report]			Ankara Arena, Ankara
Scoring leaders			Ankara Arena, Ankara
(0/0)	Total	(0/0)
(0/0)	Attack	(0/0)
(0/0)	Block	(0/0)
(0/0)	Serve	(0/0)

==== Tournament 13 ====
N/A	–	N/A	Ankara Arena, Ankara
(–, –, –, –, –) [ Report]			Ankara Arena, Ankara
Scoring leaders			Ankara Arena, Ankara
(0/0)	Total	(0/0)
(0/0)	Attack	(0/0)
(0/0)	Block	(0/0)
(0/0)	Serve	(0/0)

N/A	–	N/A	Ankara Arena, Ankara
(–, –, –, –, –) [ Report]			Ankara Arena, Ankara
Scoring leaders			Ankara Arena, Ankara
(0/0)	Total	(0/0)
(0/0)	Attack	(0/0)
(0/0)	Block	(0/0)
(0/0)	Serve	(0/0)

N/A	–	N/A	Ankara Arena, Ankara
(–, –, –, –, –) [ Report]			Ankara Arena, Ankara
Scoring leaders			Ankara Arena, Ankara
(0/0)	Total	(0/0)
(0/0)	Attack	(0/0)
(0/0)	Block	(0/0)
(0/0)	Serve	(0/0)

==== Tournament 14 ====
N/A	–	N/A	Ankara Arena, Ankara
(–, –, –, –, –) [ Report]			Ankara Arena, Ankara
Scoring leaders			Ankara Arena, Ankara
(0/0)	Total	(0/0)
(0/0)	Attack	(0/0)
(0/0)	Block	(0/0)
(0/0)	Serve	(0/0)

N/A	–	N/A	Ankara Arena, Ankara
(–, –, –, –, –) [ Report]			Ankara Arena, Ankara
Scoring leaders			Ankara Arena, Ankara
(0/0)	Total	(0/0)
(0/0)	Attack	(0/0)
(0/0)	Block	(0/0)
(0/0)	Serve	(0/0)

N/A	–	N/A	Ankara Arena, Ankara
(–, –, –, –, –) [ Report]			Ankara Arena, Ankara
Scoring leaders			Ankara Arena, Ankara
(0/0)	Total	(0/0)
(0/0)	Attack	(0/0)
(0/0)	Block	(0/0)
(0/0)	Serve	(0/0)

==== Tournament 15 ====
N/A	–	N/A	Ankara Arena, Ankara
(–, –, –, –, –) [ Report]			Ankara Arena, Ankara
Scoring leaders			Ankara Arena, Ankara
(0/0)	Total	(0/0)
(0/0)	Attack	(0/0)
(0/0)	Block	(0/0)
(0/0)	Serve	(0/0)

N/A	–	N/A	Ankara Arena, Ankara
(–, –, –, –, –) [ Report]			Ankara Arena, Ankara
Scoring leaders			Ankara Arena, Ankara
(0/0)	Total	(0/0)
(0/0)	Attack	(0/0)
(0/0)	Block	(0/0)
(0/0)	Serve	(0/0)

N/A	–	N/A	Ankara Arena, Ankara
(–, –, –, –, –) [ Report]			Ankara Arena, Ankara
Scoring leaders			Ankara Arena, Ankara
(0/0)	Total	(0/0)
(0/0)	Attack	(0/0)
(0/0)	Block	(0/0)
(0/0)	Serve	(0/0)

==== Tournament 16 ====
N/A	–	N/A	Ankara Arena, Ankara
(–, –, –, –, –) [ Report]			Ankara Arena, Ankara
Scoring leaders			Ankara Arena, Ankara
(0/0)	Total	(0/0)
(0/0)	Attack	(0/0)
(0/0)	Block	(0/0)
(0/0)	Serve	(0/0)

N/A	–	N/A	Ankara Arena, Ankara
(–, –, –, –, –) [ Report]			Ankara Arena, Ankara
Scoring leaders			Ankara Arena, Ankara
(0/0)	Total	(0/0)
(0/0)	Attack	(0/0)
(0/0)	Block	(0/0)
(0/0)	Serve	(0/0)

N/A	–	N/A	Ankara Arena, Ankara
(–, –, –, –, –) [ Report]			Ankara Arena, Ankara
Scoring leaders			Ankara Arena, Ankara
(0/0)	Total	(0/0)
(0/0)	Attack	(0/0)
(0/0)	Block	(0/0)
(0/0)	Serve	(0/0)

=== Week 3 ===
==== Tournament 17 ====
N/A	–	N/A	Ankara Arena, Ankara
(–, –, –, –, –) [ Report]			Ankara Arena, Ankara
Scoring leaders			Ankara Arena, Ankara
(0/0)	Total	(0/0)
(0/0)	Attack	(0/0)
(0/0)	Block	(0/0)
(0/0)	Serve	(0/0)

N/A	–	N/A	Ankara Arena, Ankara
(–, –, –, –, –) [ Report]			Ankara Arena, Ankara
Scoring leaders			Ankara Arena, Ankara
(0/0)	Total	(0/0)
(0/0)	Attack	(0/0)
(0/0)	Block	(0/0)
(0/0)	Serve	(0/0)

N/A	–	N/A	Ankara Arena, Ankara
(–, –, –, –, –) [ Report]			Ankara Arena, Ankara
Scoring leaders			Ankara Arena, Ankara
(0/0)	Total	(0/0)
(0/0)	Attack	(0/0)
(0/0)	Block	(0/0)
(0/0)	Serve	(0/0)

==== Tournament 18 ====
N/A	–	N/A	Ankara Arena, Ankara
(–, –, –, –, –) [ Report]			Ankara Arena, Ankara
Scoring leaders			Ankara Arena, Ankara
(0/0)	Total	(0/0)
(0/0)	Attack	(0/0)
(0/0)	Block	(0/0)
(0/0)	Serve	(0/0)

N/A	–	N/A	Ankara Arena, Ankara
(–, –, –, –, –) [ Report]			Ankara Arena, Ankara
Scoring leaders			Ankara Arena, Ankara
(0/0)	Total	(0/0)
(0/0)	Attack	(0/0)
(0/0)	Block	(0/0)
(0/0)	Serve	(0/0)

N/A	–	N/A	Ankara Arena, Ankara
(–, –, –, –, –) [ Report]			Ankara Arena, Ankara
Scoring leaders			Ankara Arena, Ankara
(0/0)	Total	(0/0)
(0/0)	Attack	(0/0)
(0/0)	Block	(0/0)
(0/0)	Serve	(0/0)

==== Tournament 19 ====
N/A	–	N/A	Ankara Arena, Ankara
(–, –, –, –, –) [ Report]			Ankara Arena, Ankara
Scoring leaders			Ankara Arena, Ankara
(0/0)	Total	(0/0)
(0/0)	Attack	(0/0)
(0/0)	Block	(0/0)
(0/0)	Serve	(0/0)

N/A	–	N/A	Ankara Arena, Ankara
(–, –, –, –, –) [ Report]			Ankara Arena, Ankara
Scoring leaders			Ankara Arena, Ankara
(0/0)	Total	(0/0)
(0/0)	Attack	(0/0)
(0/0)	Block	(0/0)
(0/0)	Serve	(0/0)

N/A	–	N/A	Ankara Arena, Ankara
(–, –, –, –, –) [ Report]			Ankara Arena, Ankara
Scoring leaders			Ankara Arena, Ankara
(0/0)	Total	(0/0)
(0/0)	Attack	(0/0)
(0/0)	Block	(0/0)
(0/0)	Serve	(0/0)

==== Tournament 20 ====
N/A	–	N/A	Ankara Arena, Ankara
(–, –, –, –, –) [ Report]			Ankara Arena, Ankara
Scoring leaders			Ankara Arena, Ankara
(0/0)	Total	(0/0)
(0/0)	Attack	(0/0)
(0/0)	Block	(0/0)
(0/0)	Serve	(0/0)

N/A	–	N/A	Ankara Arena, Ankara
(–, –, –, –, –) [ Report]			Ankara Arena, Ankara
Scoring leaders			Ankara Arena, Ankara
(0/0)	Total	(0/0)
(0/0)	Attack	(0/0)
(0/0)	Block	(0/0)
(0/0)	Serve	(0/0)

N/A	–	N/A	Ankara Arena, Ankara
(–, –, –, –, –) [ Report]			Ankara Arena, Ankara
Scoring leaders			Ankara Arena, Ankara
(0/0)	Total	(0/0)
(0/0)	Attack	(0/0)
(0/0)	Block	(0/0)
(0/0)	Serve	(0/0)

==== Tournament 21 ====
N/A	–	N/A	Ankara Arena, Ankara
(–, –, –, –, –) [ Report]			Ankara Arena, Ankara
Scoring leaders			Ankara Arena, Ankara
(0/0)	Total	(0/0)
(0/0)	Attack	(0/0)
(0/0)	Block	(0/0)
(0/0)	Serve	(0/0)

N/A	–	N/A	Ankara Arena, Ankara
(–, –, –, –, –) [ Report]			Ankara Arena, Ankara
Scoring leaders			Ankara Arena, Ankara
(0/0)	Total	(0/0)
(0/0)	Attack	(0/0)
(0/0)	Block	(0/0)
(0/0)	Serve	(0/0)

N/A	–	N/A	Ankara Arena, Ankara
(–, –, –, –, –) [ Report]			Ankara Arena, Ankara
Scoring leaders			Ankara Arena, Ankara
(0/0)	Total	(0/0)
(0/0)	Attack	(0/0)
(0/0)	Block	(0/0)
(0/0)	Serve	(0/0)

==== Tournament 22 ====
N/A	–	N/A	Ankara Arena, Ankara
(–, –, –, –, –) [ Report]			Ankara Arena, Ankara
Scoring leaders			Ankara Arena, Ankara
(0/0)	Total	(0/0)
(0/0)	Attack	(0/0)
(0/0)	Block	(0/0)
(0/0)	Serve	(0/0)

N/A	–	N/A	Ankara Arena, Ankara
(–, –, –, –, –) [ Report]			Ankara Arena, Ankara
Scoring leaders			Ankara Arena, Ankara
(0/0)	Total	(0/0)
(0/0)	Attack	(0/0)
(0/0)	Block	(0/0)
(0/0)	Serve	(0/0)

N/A	–	N/A	Ankara Arena, Ankara
(–, –, –, –, –) [ Report]			Ankara Arena, Ankara
Scoring leaders			Ankara Arena, Ankara
(0/0)	Total	(0/0)
(0/0)	Attack	(0/0)
(0/0)	Block	(0/0)
(0/0)	Serve	(0/0)

==== Tournament 23 ====
N/A	–	N/A	Ankara Arena, Ankara
(–, –, –, –, –) [ Report]			Ankara Arena, Ankara
Scoring leaders			Ankara Arena, Ankara
(0/0)	Total	(0/0)
(0/0)	Attack	(0/0)
(0/0)	Block	(0/0)
(0/0)	Serve	(0/0)

N/A	–	N/A	Ankara Arena, Ankara
(–, –, –, –, –) [ Report]			Ankara Arena, Ankara
Scoring leaders			Ankara Arena, Ankara
(0/0)	Total	(0/0)
(0/0)	Attack	(0/0)
(0/0)	Block	(0/0)
(0/0)	Serve	(0/0)

N/A	–	N/A	Ankara Arena, Ankara
(–, –, –, –, –) [ Report]			Ankara Arena, Ankara
Scoring leaders			Ankara Arena, Ankara
(0/0)	Total	(0/0)
(0/0)	Attack	(0/0)
(0/0)	Block	(0/0)
(0/0)	Serve	(0/0)

==== Tournament 24 ====
N/A	–	N/A	Ankara Arena, Ankara
(–, –, –, –, –) [ Report]			Ankara Arena, Ankara
Scoring leaders			Ankara Arena, Ankara
(0/0)	Total	(0/0)
(0/0)	Attack	(0/0)
(0/0)	Block	(0/0)
(0/0)	Serve	(0/0)

N/A	–	N/A	Ankara Arena, Ankara
(–, –, –, –, –) [ Report]			Ankara Arena, Ankara
Scoring leaders			Ankara Arena, Ankara
(0/0)	Total	(0/0)
(0/0)	Attack	(0/0)
(0/0)	Block	(0/0)
(0/0)	Serve	(0/0)

N/A	–	N/A	Ankara Arena, Ankara
(–, –, –, –, –) [ Report]			Ankara Arena, Ankara
Scoring leaders			Ankara Arena, Ankara
(0/0)	Total	(0/0)
(0/0)	Attack	(0/0)
(0/0)	Block	(0/0)
(0/0)	Serve	(0/0)

== See also ==
- 2026 Men's European Volleyball League league round
- 2026 Women's European Volleyball Championship
- 2026 AVC Women's Volleyball Cup
