= Ankara Arena =

Sports venue in Ankara, Turkey

- Ankara Spor Salonu
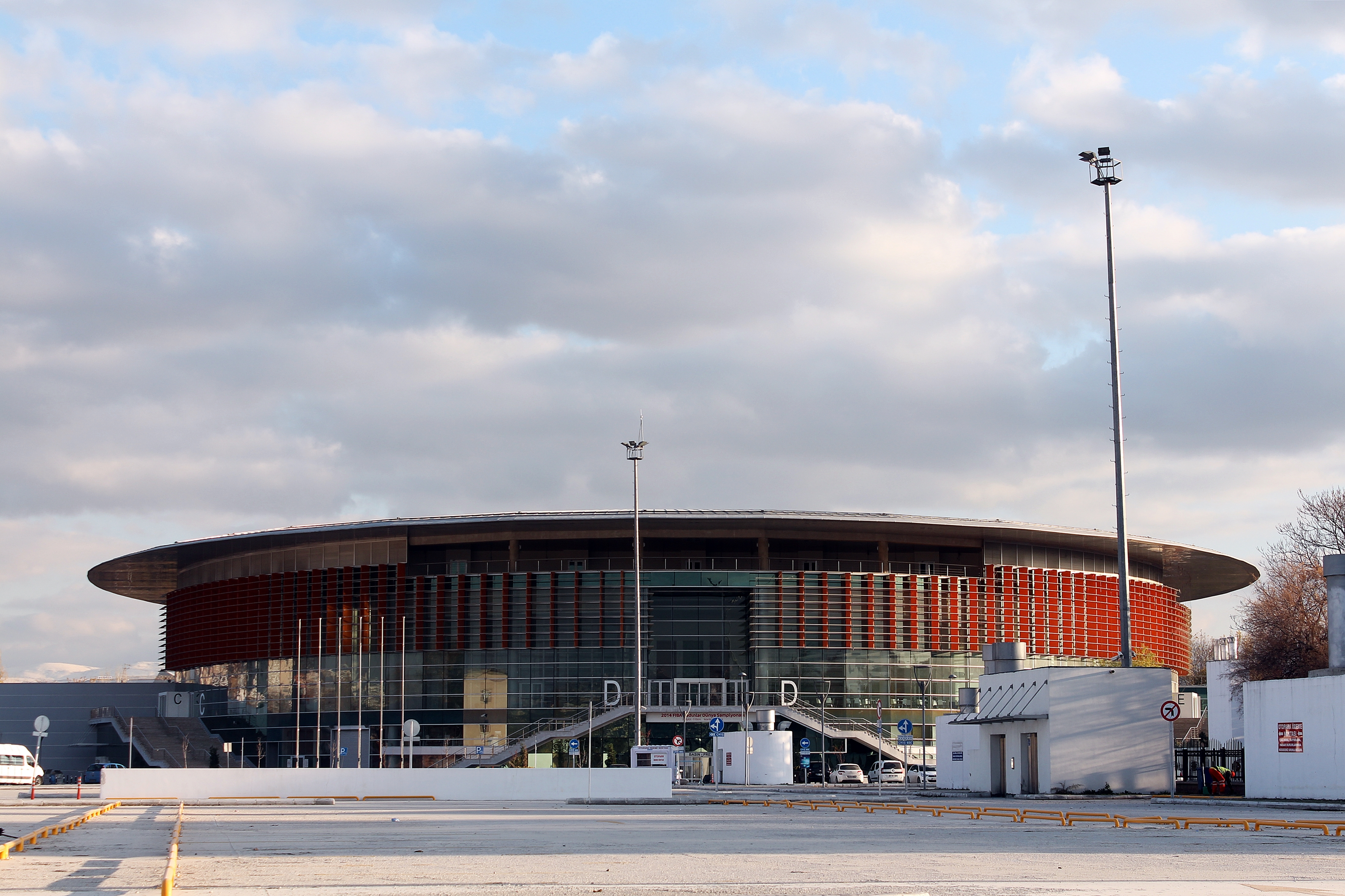
- Interactive map of Ankara Arena
- Location: Ankara, Turkey
- Coordinates: 39.937847°N 32.843896°E
- Owner: Ankara Metropolitan Municipality
- Capacity: Basketball: 10,400

Construction
- Groundbreaking: June 17, 2009
- Opened: April 23, 2010; 16 years ago
- Cost: TRY ₺ 47.1 million (approx. € 20 million)
- Architect: Yazgan Tasarım Mimarlık
- Main contractor: Türkerler İnşaat

Tenants
- Hacettepe Üniversitesi (TBL); Türk Telekom Basketbol (TBL); Optimum TED Ankara Kolejliler (TBL)

The Ankara Arena (Turkish: Ankara Spor Salonu), is an indoor sporting arena that is located in Ankara, Turkey that opened in April 2010. The seating capacity of the arena is 10,400 spectators.

Built for the 2010 FIBA World Championship, the new venue replaced the nearby Ankara Atatürk Sport Hall as the home of Turkish Basketball League clubs, Hacettepe Üniversitesi, Türk Telekom Basketbol and Optimum TED Ankara Kolejliler.

In 2011, the arena hosted along with the Başkent Volleyball Hall the FIVB Girls Youth World Championship.

Matches of the 2012 FIBA World Olympic Qualifying Tournament for Women were played at the arena between June 25-July 1.

== International events ==
- 2015 FIVB Volleyball Women's U23 World Championship 12–19 August 2015

== Concerts ==
Tarkan performed at the arena on November 6, 2010.

Inna performed as part of her INNA en Concert Tour on May 26, 2011.

Elton John performed as part of his Greatest Hits Tour on July 6, 2011.

== See also ==
- List of indoor arenas in Turkey
