= Latvian Team Sports Hall =

Multi-functional sports facility in Riga, Latvia

Komandu sporta spēļu halle
- Interactive map of Komandu sporta spēļu halle
- Location: Kr.Barona iela 99C, Rīga, Latvia
- Coordinates: 56.9636°N 24.1414°E
- Owner: Ministry of Education and Science of Latvia
- Operator: SIA Latvijas Nacionālais sporta centrs
- Capacity: 2900 (multifunctional hall); 300 (football)

Construction
- Groundbreaking: 20 October 2023
- Opened: 19 December 2024
- Cost: 21 000 000 EUR
- Architects: Ozola & Bula
- Structural engineer: Arčers

Tenants
- Latvia women's national basketball team (2025–present) Latvia women's national volleyball team (2025–present); Latvia men's national volleyball team (2025–present) Rīgas Zeļļi (LEBL) (2025–present)

Website
- https://www.lnsc.lv/sports/komandu-sporta-spelu-halle/

The Latvian Team Sports Hall (Latvian: Komandu sporta spēļu halle), is an indoor multi-functional sports facility in Rīga, Latvia, which was opened in 2024.

== Facilities ==
The Latvian Team Sports Hall the area of approximately 12 000 square meters. The Hall offers a multifunctional sports hall, an facilities for basketball, futsal and volleyball, as well as office spaces and a hotel. The headquarters of the Latvian Basketball Association are located at the centre.

== See also ==
- List of indoor arenas in Latvia
